= List of TV Guide covers (2000s) =

This is a list of issue covers of TV Guide magazine from the decade of the 2000s, from January 2000 to December 2009. The entries on this table include each cover's subjects and their artists (photographer or illustrator). This list is for the regular weekly issues of TV Guide, and includes covers that are national or regional in nature, along with any covers that were available exclusively to subscribers. Any one-time-only special issues of TV Guide are not included.

From the beginning of this decade until the 4/3/2004 cover, dates indicated fell on a Saturday (the TV listings were in a Saturday-to-Friday pattern). Issue dates from 4/11/2004 to 10/9/2005 fell on a Sunday (Sunday-to-Saturday listings). Issue dates from 10/17/2005 onward fall on a Monday (Monday-to-Sunday listings).

NOTE: Beginning in 2006, TV Guide occasionally produced 2-week "double issues." Such issue dates are indicated in bold italics, with listings covering that week and the following week.

== 2000 ==
Issue date	Cover subject	Cover type	Artist
1/1/2000	* Elvis Presley, "TV Guide's Entertainer of the Century" (2 national covers); *Members of the St. Louis Rams and Tennessee Titans (8 regional covers)	Photograph	
1/8/2000	James Gandolfini, Edie Falco, Aida Turturro, David Proval, Stevie Van Zandt, Tony Sirico, Drea de Matteo, Michael Imperioli, Robert Iler, Jamie-Lynn Sigler, and Dominic Chianese of The Sopranos (foldout cover)	Photograph	Frank W. Ockenfels
1/15/2000	Regis Philbin with Who Wants to Be a Millionaire? contestants John Carpenter, Jane Oviatt, & Andres Rivera	Photograph	Danny Clinch for TV Guide
1/22/2000	Barbra Streisand	Photograph	Firooz Zahedi for TV Guide
1/29/2000	Wrestlers Triple H, Chyna, The Rock, and Mankind & Socko (separately on 4 covers)	Photograph	Uli Rose for TV Guide
2/5/2000	Mary Tyler Moore & Valerie Harper of Mary and Rhoda	Photograph	
2/12/2000	*The cast of Will & Grace; *Father-and-son NASCAR drivers: ** Dale Earnhardt and Dale Earnhardt Jr. ** Dale, Jason, and Ned Jarrett ** Justin and Terry Labonte ** Kyle, Adam, and Richard Petty	Photograph	Will & Grace: Challenge Roddie
2/19/2000	Sarah Michelle Gellar of Buffy the Vampire Slayer	Photograph	
2/26/2000	* Dylan McDermott of The Practice (national); *Remembering Tom Landry (regional)	Photograph	
3/4/2000	TV Guide Awards preview, featuring Lisa Kudrow, Sam Waterston, Sela Ward, Ray Romano, David Hyde Pierce, Phylicia Rashād, Amy Brenneman, and David Duchovny	Photo Montage	
3/11/2000	Josh Charles, Felicity Huffman, & Peter Krause of Sports Night	Photograph	
3/18/2000	Frankie Muniz, Jane Kaczmarek, & Bryan Cranston of Malcolm in the Middle	Photograph	George Lange for TV Guide
3/25/2000	Cybill Shepherd	Photograph	
4/1/2000	Members of 'N Sync (separately on 5 covers)	Photograph	
4/8/2000	George Clooney of Fail Safe	Photograph	
4/15/2000	A commemoration of The Three Stooges (4 covers) * Curly Howard * Larry Fine * Moe Howard; *The Three Stooges cast members Evan Handler, John Kassir, Paul Ben-Victor, and Michael Chiklis	Photograph	Cast photo by James Minchin for TV Guide
4/22/2000	Dixie Chicks	Photograph	George Holz for TV Guide
4/29/2000	* Bryant Gumbel of The Early Show * Cal Ripken Jr. of the Baltimore Orioles	Photograph	
5/6/2000	* Jeremy Sisto of Jesus (2 national covers) * Kentucky Derby preview, featuring entry The Deputy (regional)	Photograph	
5/13/2000	Michael J. Fox of Spin City	Photograph	
5/20/2000	Donny and Marie Osmond	Photograph	Randee St. Nicholas for TV Guide
5/27/2000	*Survivor contestants *Remembering Adam Petty * Indianapolis 500 preview, featuring Kenny Brack (regional); *Members of the Colorado Avalanche and Philadelphia Flyers (8 regional covers)	Photograph	
6/3/2000	Britney Spears (2 covers)	Photograph	
6/10/2000	"Where Are They Now?" featuring Mr. T of The A-Team, Butch Patrick of The Munsters, Lisa Whelchel of The Facts of Life and Larry Storch of F-Troop	Photo montage	Mr. T: J. Bond/Shooting Star; Patrick: CBS/FF; Whelchel: Bernard Boudreau; Storch: Sheedy-Long
6/17/2000	Sex and the City cast members Kim Cattrall, Kristin Davis, Cynthia Nixon, and Sarah Jessica Parker (separately on 4 covers)	Photograph	Dah Len for TV Guide
6/24/2000	*Castmembers of The Real World (National) * Los Angeles Lakers' Kobe Bryant, Rick Fox, Shaquille O'Neal, and Glen Rice (4 separate regional covers)		
7/1/2000	Judy Garland, Bert Lahr, Ray Bolger, and Jack Haley of the motion picture The Wizard of Oz (separately on 4 covers)	Photo illustration	Illustration by Log Cabin Studio
7/8/2000	* Rudy Boesch, Kelly Wiglesworth, Jenna Lewis, and Sue Hawk of Survivor * Major League Baseball players Andrés Galarraga, Chipper Jones, Mark McGwire, Randy Johnson, Pedro Martínez, and Ken Griffey Jr. (separately on 6 covers); *Saluting Steve Young (2 regional covers)	Survivor:Photo montage Other covers: photograph	McGwire: V. J. Lovero for Sports Illustrated
7/15/2000	Halle Berry, Hugh Jackman, Famke Janssen, James Marsden, Anna Paquin, and Patrick Stewart of the film X-Men (separately on 6 covers)	Photograph	
7/22/2000	Martin Sheen of The West Wing	Photograph	David Burnett
7/29/2000	"The Sexiest Stars in the Universe" (8 covers) * Claudia Black of Farscape * Roxann Dawson of Star Trek: Voyager * Gigi Edgley of Farscape * Katherine Heigl of Roswell * Virginia Hey of Farscape * Renee O'Connor of Xena: Warrior Princess * Jeri Ryan of Star Trek: Voyager * Xenia Seeberg of Lexx	Photograph	
8/5/2000	Clint Eastwood of the film Space Cowboys	Photograph	
8/12/2000	NASCAR drivers Dale Earnhardt, Bill Elliott, Ricky Rudd, and Rusty Wallace (separately on 4 covers)	Photograph	
8/19/2000	Wrestlers Kurt Angle, Chris Jericho, The Kat, & Rikishi (separately on 4 covers)	Photograph	Len Irish for TV Guide
8/26/2000	2000 MTV Video Music Awards (5 covers) * Christina Aguilera * Metallica * 'N Sync * Sisqo; *Hosts Marlon and Shawn Wayans	Photograph	
9/2/2000	* NFL Preview" (18 regional covers) * Dennis Miller of Monday Night Football	Photograph	
9/9/2000	"Returning Favorites" issue, featuring Leslie Bibb and Carly Pope of Popular, Frankie Muniz of Malcolm in the Middle, Eric McCormack and Debra Messing of Will & Grace, Drew Carey of The Drew Carey Show, and Mo'Nique of The Parkers	Photo Montage	
9/16/2000	Olympians Julie Foudy, Maurice Greene, Chamique Holdsclaw, Marion Jones, Lenny Krayzelburg, and Jenny Thompson (separately on 6 covers)	Photograph	All by Ruedi Hoffmann
9/23/2000	Tim McGraw (Inset: Richard Hatch and Kelly Wiglesworth of Survivor)	Photograph	
9/30/2000	"Fall Preview", featuring Geena Davis, Michael Richards, John Goodman, & Bette Midler	Photograph	Jay Gullixson for TV Guide
10/7/2000	Katie Couric & Matt Lauer of Today	Photograph	
10/14/2000	Melina Kanakaredes of Providence	Photograph	
10/21/2000	24 supporting characters from The Simpsons (each on separate covers)	Illustration	Matt Groening
10/28/2000	Drew Barrymore, Cameron Diaz, and Lucy Liu of the film Charlie's Angels (2 covers)	Photograph	
11/4/2000	Gillian Anderson, David Duchovny, and Robert Patrick of The X-Files (separately on 3 covers)	Photograph	Alberto Tolot
11/11/2000	*Members of The Beatles (separately on 4 covers); *An embossed The Beatles-inspired "White Cover"	Photo illustration	Curt Gunther (photos); Log Cabin Studio (illustration)
11/18/2000	Jim Carrey of the film The Grinch	Photograph	Andrew Macpherson
11/25/2000	Jessica Alba of Dark Angel	Photograph	
12/2/2000	Barbara Walters, Joy Behar, Meredith Vieira, Lisa Ling, and Star Jones of The View	Photo Montage	
12/9/2000	"We've Got Game! The Latest in Video and Computer Games", featuring characters from Tony Hawk's Pro Skater 2, Tomb Raider: Chronicles, John Madden Football, Pokémon, EverQuest, and Shenmue (separately on 6 covers)	Illustration	
12/16/2000	Benjamin Bratt	Photograph	
12/23/2000	The motion picture Gone with the Wind (5 covers: 3 with Vivien Leigh, 1 with Clark Gable, 1 with Gable and Leigh together)	Photo Illustration	
12/30/2000	* Mary Hart and Bob Goen of Entertainment Tonight * 2001 Orange Bowl preview, featuring Josh Heupel of the Oklahoma Sooners	Photograph	

== 2001 ==
Issue date	Cover subject	Cover type	Artist
1/6/2001	"The Year in Jeers!"	Illustration	
1/13/2001	Elvis Presley, on the week of the airing of an updated Elvis: That's the Way It Is (5 covers)	Photograph (4 covers); Hologram (1 cover)	
1/20/2001	Contestants from Survivor: The Australian Outback (2 covers)	Photograph	
1/27/2001	"The 50 Greatest Game Shows of All Time", featuring Alex Trebek and Regis Philbin	Photograph	Uli Rose for TV Guide
2/3/2001	Anthony Hopkins of the film Hannibal	Photograph	
2/10/2001	"TV's MVPs" (3 covers): * Edie Falco of The Sopranos, Conan O'Brien of Late Night with Conan O'Brien and Carson Daly of Last Call with Carson Daly * Jane Kaczmarek of Malcolm in the Middle, Matt LeBlanc of Friends and Steve Harris of The Practice * Megan Mullally of Will & Grace, John Spencer of The West Wing and Amy Brenneman of Judging Amy	Photograph	
2/17/2001	NASCAR Preview (4 covers) * Kyle Petty * Tony Stewart and Bobby Labonte * Matt Kenseth * Casey Atwood and Bill Elliott	Photograph	
2/24/2001	* Judy Garland (4 covers) * Judy Davis of Life with Judy Garland: Me and My Shadows	Photograph	
3/3/2001	"TV Guide Awards" preview, featuring Marg Helgenberger, Oprah Winfrey, Jessica Alba, David James Elliott, Eric McCormack, Sela Ward, and Tom Cavanagh	Photo Montage	
3/10/2001	Janet Jackson (2 covers)	Photograph	
3/17/2001	Edie Falco and James Gandolfini of The Sopranos	Photograph	Stephen Danelian for TV Guide
3/24/2001	"The 50 Greatest Movie Moments of All Time"	Photo Montage	
3/31/2001	Rachael Leigh Cook, Tara Reid, and Rosario Dawson of the film Josie and the Pussycats	Photograph	Andrew Southam for TV Guide
4/7/2001	* Ioan Gruffudd of Horatio Hornblower * Mario Lemieux of the Pittsburgh Penguins	Photograph	
4/14/2001	David Letterman of Late Show	Illustration	Philip Burke
4/21/2001	Sela Ward, Billy Campbell, Shane West, Julia Whelan, Meredith Deane, and Evan Rachel Wood of Once and Again	Photograph	Bill Reitzel for TV Guide
4/28/2001	* Lara Flynn Boyle of The Practice (national) * 2001 Kentucky Derby preview, featuring entrant Point Given	Photograph	
5/5/2001	Paul McCartney	Photograph	
5/12/2001	* Marilyn Monroe (4 covers) * Poppy Montgomery of Blonde	Photograph (4 covers); Illustration (1 cover)	Illustration by Andy Warhol
5/19/2001	The finale of Star Trek: Voyager (4 covers): * Kate Mulgrew * Jeri Ryan; *Ryan, Alice Krige, and Mulgrew * Robert Beltran, Mulgrew, and Tim Russ (front); Ethan Phillips, Roxann Dawson, and Robert Duncan McNeill (back)	Photograph	
5/26/2001	Backstreet Boys (6 covers, with the group members appearing together on one cover and individually on the other five)	Photograph	
6/2/2001	Laila Ali and Jacquelyn Frazier-Lyde	Photograph	
6/9/2001	Tiger Woods (4 covers)	Photo Illustration	
6/16/2001	Bill O'Reilly of The O'Reilly Factor	Photograph	
6/23/2001	* Ming-Na, Michael Michele, Alex Kingston, Maura Tierney, and Laura Innes of ER (national); *Members of the Los Angeles Lakers (6 regional covers)	Photograph	
6/30/2001	Jerry Seinfeld	Photograph	
7/7/2001	Juliet Mills, Galen Gering, and McKenzie Westmore of Passions (2 covers)	Photograph	
7/14/2001	Julianna Margulies of The Mists of Avalon	Photograph	
7/21/2001	*Rugrats characters Angelica, Chuckie, Tommy, and Lil & Phil (separately on 4 covers); *Remembering Chet Atkins	Rugrats: Illustration; Atkins: Photograph	
7/28/2001	The film Planet of the Apes (6 covers): * Helena Bonham Carter * Tim Roth * Mark Wahlberg * Estella Warren * Michael Clarke Duncan (front); Glenn Shadix (back) * Kris Kristofferson (front); Lisa Marie (back)	Photograph	
8/4/2001	The cast of That '70s Show (6 covers)	Photograph	Bill Reitzel for TV Guide
8/11/2001	"Young Hollywood in Love", featuring Justin Timberlake & Britney Spears, Sarah Michelle Gellar & Freddie Prinze Jr., Jessica Alba & Michael Weatherly, and Katie Holmes & Chris Klein	Photo Montage	
8/18/2001	Kelly Ripa	Photograph	
8/25/2001	Scott Bakula and Jolene Blalock of Enterprise (3 covers, with Bakula and Blalock appearing together on one cover and separately on the other two)	Photograph	
9/1/2001	NFL preview		
9/8/2001	"Returning Favorites" issue, featuring Calista Flockhart of Ally McBeal, Rob Lowe of The West Wing, Sarah Michelle Gellar of Buffy the Vampire Slayer, Billy Campbell of Once and Again, Chi McBride of Boston Public, and Amy Brenneman of Judging Amy		
9/15/2001	"Fall Preview" issue, featuring Jill Hennessy of Crossing Jordan, Kim Delaney of Philly, and Jennifer Garner of Alias	Photograph	
9/22/2001	* Frank John Hughes, Damian Lewis, Ron Livingston, and Scott Grimes of Band of Brothers with producer Tom Hanks (national) * Jimmy Rollins and Bobby Abreu of the Philadelphia Phillies on separate covers (regional)		
9/29/2001	"Terror Hits Home"	Photograph	
10/6/2001	Contestants of Survivor: Africa (18 separate covers)	Photograph	
10/13/2001	The 50th anniversary of I Love Lucy (8 covers)		
10/20/2001	Jessica Alba and Michael Weatherly of Dark Angel		
10/27/2001	Daniel Radcliffe, Emma Watson, Rupert Grint, and Robbie Coltrane of the film Harry Potter and the Sorcerer's Stone appearing separately on 4 covers		
11/3/2001	Elisha Cuthbert, Kiefer Sutherland, and Dennis Haysbert of 24		
11/10/2001	Michael Jackson (2 covers)	Photograph	
11/17/2001	Jennifer Aniston and David Schwimmer of Friends		
11/24/2001	R2-D2		
12/1/2001	The Rock		
12/8/2001	Smallville (4 covers) * Tom Welling as Clark Kent * Kristin Kreuk as Lana Lang * Michael Rosenbaum as Lex Luthor * Superman	Illustration	Alex Ross
12/15/2001	The cast of the film The Lord of the Rings: The Fellowship of the Ring (4 covers) * Orlando Bloom and Cate Blanchett * Liv Tyler and Viggo Mortensen * Ian McKellen * Sean Astin, Elijah Wood, Billy Boyd, and Dominic Monaghan	Photo illustration	John Howe (illustrator); Pierre Vinet/New Line (photographer)
12/22/2001	"The American Spirit", 5 separate covers illustrating the American Flag	Illustration	*Al Hirschfeld; *Peter Max; *R. A. Miller; *Beata Rubin; *Jamie Wyeth
12/29/2001	"Tribute 2001", featuring George Harrison, Jack Lemmon, and Dale Evans		

== 2002 ==
Issue date	Cover subject	Cover type	Artist
1/5/2002	Carol Burnett, Tim Conway, Harvey Korman, and Vicki Lawrence of The Carol Burnett Show	Photograph	
1/12/2002	*The 50th Anniversary of Today (3 covers) ** Dave Garroway ** Hugh Downs and Barbara Walters ** Katie Couric and Matt Lauer * Robert Redford	Photograph	
1/19/2002	Harrison Ford		
1/26/2002	Stephen King's Rose Red	Illustration	
2/2/2002	Bernie Mac of The Bernie Mac Show		
2/9/2002	* Winter Olympic preview, featuring Michelle Kwan * Jeremy Roenick and John LeClair of the Philadelphia Flyers	Photograph	
2/16/2002	NASCAR preview, with Dale Earnhardt and Dale Earnhardt Jr. appearing together on a holographic effect cover and separately on 2 other covers	Photograph	Earnhardt, Sr.: CIA Stock Photography
2/23/2002	William Petersen and Marg Helgenberger of CSI: Crime Scene Investigation	Photograph	Kate Garner
3/2/2002	Charlie Sheen of Spin City and Martin Sheen of The West Wing	Photograph	
3/9/2002	"2002 TV MVPs" (4 covers): * Tina Fey of Saturday Night Live, Cynthia Nixon of Sex and the City and Esai Morales of NYPD Blue * Allison Janney of The West Wing, Peter Krause of Six Feet Under and Patricia Heaton of Everybody Loves Raymond * Chi McBride of Boston Public, Maura Tierney of ER and Bryan Cranston of Malcolm in the Middle; *News anchors Dan Rather of CBS, Tom Brokaw of NBC and Peter Jennings of ABC	Photograph	
3/16/2002	Christopher Masterson, Justin Berfield, Erik Per Sullivan and Frankie Muniz of Malcolm in the Middle		
3/23/2002	Oscar Preview, featuring Russell Crowe, Halle Berry, Marisa Tomei and Ethan Hawke		
3/30/2002	Celine Dion		
4/6/2002	"TV We'll Always Remember", part of TV Guide's 50th Anniversary	Photo Montage	
4/13/2002	Jay Leno of The Tonight Show with Jay Leno		
4/20/2002	Star Trek's 35th anniversary, featuring characters from the various Trek series on 35 covers	Photograph	
4/27/2002	The film Spider-Man on 5 covers, 4 with illustrations and 1 with the film's star, Tobey Maguire	Spider-Man: Illustration; Maguire: Photograph	
5/4/2002	"The 50 Greatest Shows of All Time," part of TV Guide's 50th Anniversary	Photo Montage	
5/11/2002	*The film Star Wars: Episode II – Attack of the Clones featured on three 3-D covers (newsstand cover); *Dinosaur characters from Dinotopia (subscriber cover)		
5/18/2002	The finale of The X-Files (2 covers): * Gillian Anderson and David Duchovny * Robert Patrick and Annabeth Gish	Photograph	
5/25/2002	Alex Michel and Amanda Marsh of The Bachelor		
6/1/2002	Ashley Judd	Photograph	
6/8/2002	The cast of Friends (separately on 6 covers)	Photograph	
6/15/2002	"Our 50 Greatest Covers of All Time", part of TV Guide's 50th Anniversary	Cover Montage	
6/22/2002	Alexis Bledel and Lauren Graham of Gilmore Girls	Photograph	Kate Garner for TV Guide
6/29/2002	Sarah Jessica Parker of Sex and the City	Photograph	
7/6/2002	Catherine Bell and David James Elliott of JAG	Photograph	
7/13/2002	American Idol contestants Jim Verraros, Tamyra Gray, and Ryan Starr	Photograph	
7/20/2002	"50 Worst Shows of All Time", part of TV Guide's 50th Anniversary	Photo montage	
7/27/2002	Kelly Ripa & Regis Philbin of Live with Regis and Kelly	Photograph	
8/3/2002	"50 Greatest Cartoon Characters of All Time", part of TV Guide's 50th Anniversary (4 covers): * Charlie Brown of Peanuts and Angelica Pickles of Rugrats * Daffy Duck and Porky Pig of Duck Dodgers in the 24½th Century with the Powerpuff Girls * Homer Simpson of The Simpsons with Rocky and Bullwinkle * Popeye and SpongeBob SquarePants	Illustration	
8/10/2002	* Leah Remini, Kevin James, and Jerry Stiller of The King of Queens * Winona Ryder * Stacey Dales-Schuman, Vicky Bullett, and Chamique Holdsclaw of the Washington Mystics	Photograph	
8/17/2002	Elvis Presley, on the 25th anniversary of his death (1 photo cover, 3 "special effect" covers)	Photograph	
8/24/2002	James Gandolfini and Edie Falco of The Sopranos appearing on separate covers	Photograph	
8/31/2002	2002 NFL Preview (6 covers)		
9/7/2002	"Returning favorites" issue, featuring Reba McEntire of Reba, Christopher Meloni of Law & Order: Special Victims Unit, and Julie Bowen of Ed	Photograph	
9/14/2002	Fall Preview issue	Photo montage	
9/21/2002	* Jennifer Garner of Alias (3 national covers) * Ernie Harwell (Michigan)	Photograph	Garner: Tony Duran for TV Guide
9/28/2002	"50 Sexiest Stars of All Time", part of TV Guide's 50th Anniversary, featuring Henry Simmons of NYPD Blue and Kim Cattrall of Sex and the City	Photograph	
10/5/2002	*The cast of Everybody Loves Raymond (national) * Don Francisco of Sábado Gigante (South Florida); *Remembering Johnny Unitas (Maryland)	Raymond: Photo montage Francisco and Unitas: Photographs	
10/12/2002	Maura Tierney, Noah Wyle, Goran Višnjić, and Mekhi Phifer of ER	Photo montage	
10/19/2002	"TV's Richest Stars"	Photo montage	
10/26/2002	The cast of Friends	Photo montage	
11/2/2002	Shania Twain	Photograph	
11/9/2002	Pierce Brosnan and Halle Berry of the film Die Another Day (3 covers, with Brosnan and Berry appearing together on 1 cover and separately on the other 2)	Photograph	
11/16/2002	Heidi Klum and Tyra Banks of the Victoria's Secret Fashion Show (3 covers, with Klum and Banks appearing together on 1 cover and separately on the other 2)	Photograph	
11/23/2002	Paul McCartney	Photograph	
11/30/2002	*"The 50 DVD's You Must Have" * Catherine Dent and Anton Yelchin of Taken	DVD's: Photo Montage; Taken: Photograph	
12/7/2002	*The film Star Trek: Nemesis (four 3-D newsstand covers) * Ted Danson of Becker (subscriber cover)		
12/14/2002	*"50 Things to Love About TV" * NASCAR drivers Greg Biffle, Mike Bliss, Ryan Newman, and Tony Stewart appearing on separate covers	*50 Things: Photo Montage; NASCAR: Photograph	
12/21/2002	Shaquille O'Neal of the Los Angeles Lakers	Photograph	
12/28/2002	Alyssa Milano, Holly Marie Combs, and Rose McGowan of Charmed (4 covers: 1 group shot and 3 individual covers)	Photograph	

== 2003 ==
Issue date	Cover subject	Cover type	Artist
1/4/2003	Kiefer Sutherland of 24	Photograph	
1/11/2003	"100 Music Moments That Rocked TV"	Photograph	
1/18/2003	"The Reality Trip: How Far Can It Go?" featuring Jeff Probst of Survivor, Trista Rehn of The Bachelor, and Simon Cowell of American Idol	Photograph	
1/25/2003	Jimmy Kimmel of Jimmy Kimmel Live!	Photograph	
2/1/2003	"Yu-Gi-Oh! How the Japanese Import Conquered Kids TV" (4 covers)	Illustration	
2/8/2003	Ben Affleck and Jennifer Garner of the motion picture Daredevil	Photograph	
2/15/2003	Homer Simpson of The Simpsons	Illustration	
2/22/2003	* Nia Vardalos of My Big Fat Greek Life; *3-D NASCAR covers featuring Dale Earnhardt Jr., Jeff Gordon, and Tony Stewart	Photograph	
3/1/2003	Peter Krause of Six Feet Under	Photograph	
3/8/2003	David Caruso of CSI: Miami	Photograph	
3/15/2003	Kelly Clarkson	Photograph	
3/22/2003	75th Academy Awards Preview	Photo Montage	
3/29/2003	Debra Messing of Will & Grace	Photograph	
4/5/2003	"The TV Cure," featuring SpongeBob SquarePants	Illustration	
4/12/2003	"Kids & the Television War: What Can They Watch? What Can You Tell Them?"; Inset: John Walsh of America's Most Wanted	Photograph	
4/19/2003	* Hilary Duff of Lizzie McGuire * Paige Davis of Trading Spaces	Photograph	
4/26/2003	*"Your Favorite Shows on DVD" * Jennifer Aniston of Friends	DVD: Photo illustration Aniston: Photograph	
5/3/2003	* Catherine Bell and David James Elliott of JAG * Kentucky Derby preview, featuring entrant Empire Maker	Photograph	
5/10/2003	Kristin Kreuk and Tom Welling of Smallville	Photograph	
5/17/2003	* Sarah Michelle Gellar of Buffy the Vampire Slayer and David Boreanaz of Angel * Randy Jackson, Paula Abdul, and Simon Cowell of American Idol	Buffy/Angel: Photo Montage; Idol: Photograph	
5/24/2003	Willie Nelson	Photo Illustration	
5/31/2003	"100 Greatest Heroes & Villains," featuring Arnold Schwarzenegger	Photograph	
6/7/2003	Mariska Hargitay and Christopher Meloni of Law & Order: Special Victims Unit	Photograph	
6/14/2003	Kim Cattrall, Kristin Davis, Cynthia Nixon, and Sarah Jessica Parker of Sex and the City (separately on 4 covers)	Photograph	
6/21/2003	*The motion picture Hulk (three 3-D newsstand covers) * Tony Shalhoub of Monk (subscriber cover)	Hulk: Illustration; Shalhoub: Photograph	
6/28/2003	Kelly Ripa & Mark Consuelos	Photograph	
7/5/2003	"NASCAR Mid-Season Special" * Matt Kenseth and Kurt Busch * Dale Earnhardt Jr. and Michael Waltrip	Photograph	
7/12/2003	* Anthony LaPaglia and Poppy Montgomery of Without a Trace * Travis Fimmel of Tarzan * MLB All-Stars Nomar Garciaparra, Ichiro Suzuki, Albert Pujols (separately on 3 covers) * Sammy Sosa of the Chicago Cubs and Frank Thomas of the Chicago White Sox	Photograph	
7/19/2003	Courtney Thorne-Smith and James Belushi of According to Jim	Photograph	
7/26/2003	Richard Dean Anderson and Michael Shanks of Stargate SG-1	Photograph	
8/2/2003	"Has Network TV Gone Too Far? Sex, Violence, and #@%*!" featuring Tony Sirico of The Sopranos	Photograph	
8/9/2003	Jay Leno of The Tonight Show	Photograph	
8/16/2003	Paige Davis of Trading Places (2 covers)	Photograph	
8/23/2003	Dr. Phil McGraw	Photograph	
8/30/2003	"NFL Preview" (multiple regional covers)	Photograph	
9/6/2003	David Boreanaz and James Marsters of Angel	Photograph	
9/13/2003	"Fall Preview", featuring a recreation of the 9/14/1957 cover (the eye on this close-up belonged to Kathryn Morris)	Photograph	Alberto Tolot for TV Guide
9/20/2003	Jennifer Aniston, David Schwimmer and Matt LeBlanc of Friends	Photograph	Matthew Rolston
9/27/2003	Trista Rehn and Ryan Sutter of The Bachelorette	Photograph	
10/4/2003	Oprah Winfrey		
10/11/2003	Rob Lowe of The Lyon's Den		
10/18/2003	Kiefer Sutherland and Dennis Haysbert of 24		
10/25/2003	*The motion picture The Matrix Revolutions (3 newsstand covers) * David Smith and Evan Marriott of Joe Millionaire (subscriber cover)	Matrix: 3-D/Photograph; Joe: Photograph	
11/1/2003	Ashton Kutcher of That '70s Show	Photograph	
11/8/2003	* Benjamin McKenzie and Mischa Barton of The O.C. *The cast of 8 Simple Rules	Photograph	
11/15/2003	Reba McEntire of Reba	Photograph	Fergus Greer for TV Guide
11/22/2003	Clay Aiken and Ruben Studdard (separate covers)	Photograph	Robert Trachtenberg for TV Guide
11/29/2003	Jennifer Garner of Alias	Photograph	
12/6/2003	* Nicole Richie and Paris Hilton of The Simple Life * NASCAR champions Matt Kenseth, Travis Kvapil, Jamie McMurray, and Brian Vickers (separately on 4 covers)	Photograph	
12/13/2003	* Ian McKellen, Viggo Mortensen, Elijah Wood, and Gollum of the motion picture The Lord of the Rings: The Return of the King (separately on 4 covers); *Contestants from Survivor: Pearl Islands	Rings: Photograph; Survivor: Photo Montage	
12/20/2003	Kevin James and Leah Remini of The King of Queens	Photograph	
12/27/2003	"Best & Worst of 2003"	Photograph	

== 2004 ==
Issue date	Cover subject	Cover type	Artist
1/3/2004	Sarah Jessica Parker and Chris Noth of Sex and the City	Photograph	Richard Phibbs for TV Guide
1/10/2004	*"The Best Military Shows Ever" * Mark Harmon of Navy NCIS	Military: Photo Montage; Harmon: Photograph	
1/17/2004	Contestants from Survivor: All-Stars (3 covers)	Photograph	
1/24/2004	Amber Tamblyn of Joan of Arcadia	Photograph	
1/31/2004	* David Boreanaz of Angel * Super Bowl XXXVIII preview (4 covers)	Photograph	Boreanaz: Jill Greenberg for TV Guide
2/7/2004	Donald Trump with The Apprentice contestants Omarosa Manigault-Stallworth and Ereka Vetrini	Photograph	
2/14/2004	* Linda Cardellini, Parminder Nagra, and Maura Tierney of ER (subscriber cover); *3 separate NASCAR covers (newsstand cover)	Photograph	
2/21/2004	*"Before They Were Stars" * Ruben Studdard and Simon Cowell	Photo Montage	
2/28/2004	76th Academy Awards preview, featuring Viggo Mortensen, Orlando Bloom, and Johnny Depp	Photo Montage	
3/6/2004	The cast of The Sopranos (foldout cover)	Photograph	
3/13/2004	*American Idol contestants LaToya London, Diana DeGarmo, and Matthew Rogers * WrestleMania XX preview (2 covers)	Photo Montage	
3/20/2004	* NCAA Tournament preview (11 regional covers) * Tyra Banks of America's Next Top Model * Rob Mariano and Amber Brkich of Survivor	Photograph	
3/27/2004	Star Jones of The View	Photograph	
4/3/2004	*"Where Are They Now?" * 2004 Major League Baseball season preview (6 regional covers)	"Where:" Photo montage Baseball: Photograph	
4/11/2004	* Nick Lachey and Jessica Simpson of Newlyweds: Nick & Jessica * Curt Schilling and Keith Foulke of the Boston Red Sox * Alex Rodriguez and Derek Jeter of the New York Yankees	Photograph	
4/18/2004	Jesse Palmer with The Bachelor contestants Suzie Williams and Trish Spear	Photograph	
4/25/2004	* Jason Bateman, Jeffrey Tambor, and Portia de Rossi of Arrested Development * 2004 Kentucky Derby preview * Ty Pennington of Extreme Makeover: Home Edition	Photograph	
5/2/2004	The cast of Friends	Photo Montage	
5/9/2004	Dick Van Dyke and Mary Tyler Moore	Photograph	
5/16/2004	*"Makeover Madness!" featuring Britney Spears (foldout cover) * Nikki Cox and Josh Duhamel of Las Vegas	Photograph	
5/23/2004	Dr. Phil McGraw	Photograph	
5/30/2004	"The 25 Top Cult Shows Ever" (four covers)	Photograph	
6/6/2004	"Summer Preview", featuring Brooke Burns of North Shore (2 covers)	Photograph	
6/13/2004	*The cast of Sex and the City on the week of the series' syndication debut * Peter Krause and Rachel Griffiths of Six Feet Under	Photograph	
6/20/2004	Dylan Walsh, Joely Richardson, and Julian McMahon of Nip/Tuck	Photograph	
6/27/2004	*"Life After Reality" * NASCAR driver Dale Earnhardt Jr.	Reality: Photo Montage; Earnhardt Jr.: Photograph	
7/4/2004	Elvis Presley (5 covers)	Photograph	
7/11/2004	Will Ferrell of the motion picture Anchorman: The Legend of Ron Burgundy (2 covers: 1 foldout, 1 standard)	Photograph	
7/18/2004	"How TV's Richest Stars Spend Their Money"	Photo montage	
7/25/2004	"Cheers & Jeers: Special Reality TV Edition"	Photo montage	
8/1/2004	"25 Greatest Sci-fi Legends" (3 covers)	Photo montage	
8/8/2004	Dave Chappelle of Chappelle's Show	Photograph	
8/15/2004	2004 Olympic Games preview, featuring Team USA athletes Swin Cash, Natalie Coughlin, Tom Pappas, and Michael Phelps (separately on 4 covers)	Photograph	
8/22/2004	Director Mel Gibson of the film The Passion of the Christ	Photograph	
8/29/2004	Matt LeBlanc of Joey	Photograph	
9/5/2004	2004 NFL season preview (16 regional covers)	Photograph	
9/12/2004	"Fall Preview," featuring Heather Locklear of LAX	Photograph	
9/19/2004	"Returning Favorites" issue	Photo montage	
9/26/2004	Melina Kanakaredes and Gary Sinise of CSI: NY	Photograph	
10/3/2004	Donald Trump with The Apprentice contestants Maria Boren and Raj Bhakta	Photograph	
10/10/2004	Charlie Sheen of Two and a Half Men	Photograph	
10/17/2004	"Mock the Vote", featuring Jon Stewart of The Daily Show eating a cake of The White House	Photograph	Jill Greenberg for TV Guide
10/24/2004	Matthew Fox, Evangeline Lilly, and Dominic Monaghan of Lost	Photograph	
10/31/2004	The O.C. (2 covers) * Mischa Barton, Rachel Bilson, and Kelly Rowan * Peter Gallagher, Adam Brody, and Benjamin McKenzie	Photograph	
11/7/2004	* Teri Hatcher, Eva Longoria, Marcia Cross and Felicity Huffman of Desperate Housewives * Shania Twain	*Housewives: Photo montage *Twain: Photograph	*Housewives:Karin Catt for TV Guide; *Twain: Mark Abrahams
11/14/2004	Clay Aiken	Photograph	
11/21/2004	The cast of Seinfeld with producer Larry David on the occasion of the series' DVD release	Photograph	
11/28/2004	Teri Hatcher and James Denton of Desperate Housewives	Photograph	
12/5/2004	"The 100 Most Memorable TV Moments" (5 covers)	Photograph	
12/12/2004	"Happy Holidays from The Simpsons", featuring 3-D holographic ornament covers	Illustration	
12/19/2004	Evangeline Lilly and Matthew Fox of Lost (separate covers)	Photograph	
12/26/2004	Ty Pennington with Extreme Makeover: Home Edition recipients Stefan Vardon and Hydeia Broadbent	Photograph	

== 2005 ==
Issue date	Cover subject	Cover type	Artist
1/2/2005	Anthony LaPaglia, Poppy Montgomery, and Eric Close of Without a Trace	Photograph	Andrew Southam for TV Guide
1/9/2005	Kiefer Sutherland of 24	Photograph	Joe Pugliese for TV Guide
1/16/2005	Joan and Melissa Rivers	Photograph	
1/23/2005	Eva Longoria and Jesse Metcalfe of Desperate Housewives		
1/30/2005	Matthew Fox, Evangeline Lilly, Josh Holloway, Naveen Andrews, Dominic Monaghan, and Terry O'Quinn of Lost (separately on 6 covers)	Photograph	
2/6/2005	Jennifer Garner of Alias	Photograph	Cliff Watts for TV Guide
2/13/2005	Remembering Johnny Carson (2 covers)	Photograph	
2/20/2005	NASCAR drivers Dale Earnhardt Jr., Jeff Gordon, and Jimmie Johnson (separately on 3 covers)	Photograph	Earnhardt Jr.: Andrew MacPherson/Corbis Outline; Gordon: CIA Stock Photography Inc.; Johnson: Jay Gullixson for TV Guide
2/27/2005	Gary Dourdan, Marg Helgenberger, and George Eads of CSI: Crime Scene Investigation	Photograph	Jill Greenberg for TV Guide
3/6/2005	Amber Brkich and Rob Mariano of The Amazing Race	Photograph	Tony Esparza/CBS
3/13/2005	Kirstie Alley of Fat Actress	Photograph	
3/20/2005	* Tricia Helfer, Katee Sackhoff, and Grace Park of Battlestar Galactica * Jill Hennessy of Crossing Jordan	Photograph	
3/27/2005	Patricia Arquette of Medium	Photograph	
4/3/2005	* Josh Holloway of Lost * Johnny Damon and Curt Schilling of the Boston Red Sox (separate covers)	Photograph	
4/10/2005	Gilmore Girls (2 covers): * Lauren Graham and Scott Patterson * Alexis Bledel and Matt Czuchry	Photograph	Frank Ockenfels/WB
4/17/2005	*"Star Trek: Ultimate Tribute," featuring characters from the various Trek series (3 covers) * Jolene Blalock, Scott Bakula, and Connor Trinneer of Star Trek: Enterprise	Trek:Photo Montage; Enterprise: Photograph	
4/24/2005	Kiefer Sutherland of 24	Photograph	
5/1/2005	*Characters from motion picture Star Wars: Episode III – Revenge of the Sith (5 covers); *Star Wars Episode III actors Hayden Christensen and Ewan McGregor * 2005 Kentucky Derby preview, featuring Stewart Elliott aboard 2004 winner Smarty Jones	Wars: 3-D illustration Christensen and Derby: Photograph	
5/8/2005	Elvis Presley (6 covers)	Photograph	
5/15/2005	The finale of Everybody Loves Raymond (2 covers) * Patricia Heaton and Ray Romano; *Heaton and Romano with Peter Boyle, Doris Roberts, and Brad Garrett	Photograph	Art Streiber
5/22/2005	American Idol contestants Carrie Underwood, Bo Bice, Vonzell Solomon, and Anthony Fedorov	Photo montage	
5/29/2005	Josh Holloway, Harold Perrineau, Malcolm David Kelley, and Daniel Dae Kim of Lost	Photograph	
6/5/2005	"TV's Sexiest Men" (6 covers) * Patrick Dempsey of Grey's Anatomy * James Denton of Desperate Housewives * Gary Dourdan of CSI: Crime Scene Investigation * Josh Holloway of Lost * Hugh Laurie of House * Tom Westman of Survivor: Palau	Photograph	
6/12/2005	The Griffin family from Family Guy (4 covers)	Illustration	
6/19/2005	"Summer Diet Special," featuring Kelly Ripa from Live! with Regis & Kelly	Photograph	
6/26/2005	"NASCAR Dynamic Duos" (4 covers) * Jimmie Johnson and Jeff Gordon * Dale Earnhardt Jr. and Michael Waltrip * Carl Edwards and Mark Martin * Elliott Sadler and Dale Jarrett	Photograph	
7/3/2005	Ioan Gruffudd, Jessica Alba, Michael Chiklis, Chris Evans, and Julian McMahon of the motion picture Fantastic Four (separate covers)	Photograph	
7/10/2005	"Sci-Fi Preview" (4 covers) * Amanda Tapping and Ben Browder of Stargate SG-1 * James Callis and Tricia Helfer of Battlestar Galactica * Rachel Luttrell and Joe Flanigan of Stargate Atlantis; *Ben Browder, Tricia Helfer, and Joe Flanigan	Photograph	
7/17/2005	"25 Awesome Sports Moments" (4 covers)	Photograph	
7/24/2005	Clay Aiken (2 covers)	Photograph	
7/31/2005	* Christopher Meloni and Mariska Hargitay of Law & Order: Special Victims Unit * IndyCar driver Danica Patrick	Photograph	
8/7/2005	Emily Procter and David Caruso of CSI: Miami	Photograph	
8/14/2005	Members of The Beatles on the 40th anniversary of their Shea Stadium concert	Photograph	
8/21/2005	Sela Ward and Hugh Laurie of House		
8/28/2005	Yunjin Kim, Dominic Monaghan, Evangeline Lilly, and Jorge Garcia of Lost	Photograph	
9/4/2005	2005 NFL season preview (2 covers) * Tom Brady of the New England Patriots * Donovan McNabb of the Philadelphia Eagles and Ben Roethlisberger of the Pittsburgh Steelers	Brady: Photograph: Donovan/Ben: Photo montage	
9/11/2005	"Fall Preview"	Photo montage	
9/18/2005	"Returning Favorites"	Photo montage	
9/25/2005	CSI: Crime Scene Investigation (2 covers) * Marg Helgenberger, George Eads, and Gary Dourdan * Robert David Hall, Jorja Fox, William Petersen, and Eric Szmanda	Photograph	
10/2/2005	Wentworth Miller of Prison Break	Photograph	Rodolfo Martinez
10/9/2005	The final digest version of TV Guide, recreating 9 classic covers: * Jennifer Love Hewitt as The Flying Nun (9/30/1967) * Howdy Doody with Conan O'Brien as Buffalo Bob Smith (6/25/1954) * Regis Philbin and Kelly Ripa as I Dream of Jeannie (1966) * Reba McEntire as Lucy Ricardo (original photo appeared on a 2001 cover); *Scrubs' Zach Braff, Donald Faison, and John C. McGinley as the cast of M*A*S*H (1976) * Jon Cryer and Charlie Sheen as The Odd Couple (1971); *The cast of The Bernie Mac Show as the cast of Good Times (12/14/1974) * Greg Gumbel and Dan Marino as Miami Vice's Tubbs and Crockett (7/27/1985) * Homer Simpson as Fred Flintstone (6/13/1964)	Photographs (except for Homer Simpson)	Covers 1-6: Andy Ryan; Covers 7-8: Patrik Giardino; Simpson Cover: Matt Groening/20th Century Fox Television
10/17/2005	"TV Guide's Extreme Makeover", the first full-size issue, with Ty Pennington wielding a sledgehammer toward the reader	Photograph	Larsen & Talbert
10/24/2005	Geena Davis of Commander in Chief	Photograph	Jack Guy
10/31/2005	Martha Stewart of The Martha Stewart Show	Photograph	
11/7/2005	Patrick Dempsey and Ellen Pompeo of Grey's Anatomy	Photograph	Brian Bowen Smith
11/14/2005	Dominic Purcell and Wentworth Miller of Prison Break	Photograph	Rodolfo Martinez
11/21/2005	Patricia Arquette and Jake Weber of Medium	Photograph	
11/28/2005	Michelle Rodriguez of Lost	Photograph	
12/5/2005	"100 Most Unexpected TV Moments"	Photo montage	
12/12/2005	Matt Lauer and Katie Couric of Today	Photograph	
12/19/2005	"My Big Year!" featuring Patrick Dempsey of Grey's Anatomy	Photograph	Rodolfo Martinez
12/26/2005	"2006 TV Preview"	Photo montage	

== 2006 ==
Issue date	Cover subject	Cover type	Artist
1/2/2006	Without a Trace Mary Elizabeth Mastrantonio		
1/9/2006	NCIS Mark Harmon		
1/16/2006	Lost Mathew Fox		
1/23/2006	Marg Helgenberger of CSI: Crime Scene Investigation	Photograph	
1/30/2006	Grey's Anatomy Justin Chambers and Katherine Heigl		
2/6/2006	Olympics Preview		
2/13/2006	Marcia Cross of Desperate Housewives	Photograph	
2/20/2006	Dancing with the Stars		
2/27/2006	Oscar Preview Jon Stewart		
3/6/2006	Edie Falco and James Gandolfini of The Sopranos	Photograph	
3/13/2006	Cold Case Danny Pino & Cathryn Morris		
3/20/2006	Grey's Anatomy T.R. Knight & Chandra Wilson		
3/27/2006	Eric Close, Poppy Montgomery, and Enrique Murciano of Without a Trace	Photograph	
4/3/2006	SVU's Mom-to-Be Mariska Hargitay Exclusive		
4/10/2006	Prison Break Wentworth Miller		
4/17/2006	House Hugh Laurie		
4/24/2006	Julia Louis-Dreyfus of The New Adventures of Old Christine	Photograph	
5/1/2006	Ellen Pompeo of Grey's Anatomy	Photograph	Brian Bowen Smith
5/8/2006	Lost Evangeline Lilly and Josh Holloway		
5/15/2006	Finale Preview David Caruso		
5/22/2006	American Idol contestants Elliott Yamin, Katharine McPhee, and Taylor Hicks	Photograph	
5/29/2006	Desperate Housewives Marcia Cross		
6/5/2006	Summer TV Preview		
6/12/2006	Kyra Sedgwick of The Closer, American Idol contestant Elliott Yamin	Photograph	
6/19/2006	TV's Sexiest men Wentworth Miller (possible multiple covers)		
6/26/2006	Dale Earnhardt Jr.	Photograph	
7/3/2006	Dennis Haysbert of The Unit	Photograph	
7/10/2006	Heidi Klum of Project Runway	Photograph	
7/17/2006	CSI Miami Emily Procter		
7/24/2006	"The Ultimate Sci-Fi Preview" (4 covers) * Tom Welling of Smallville * William Shatner and Leonard Nimoy of Star Trek (1960s photo); *Battlestar Galactica * Terry O'Quinn of Lost	Photograph	Welling: James White/The WB; Star Trek: Sheedy-Long; Galactica: Anthony Mandler/Sci Fi Channel; O'Quinn: Art Streiber/ABC
7/31/2006	SVU's Mariska Hargitay and Infant Son		
8/7/2006			
8/14/2006	"Emmy Countdown", featuring nominee Kiefer Sutherland of 24		
8/21/2006	"Emmy Preview", featuring host Conan O'Brien and several nominees	Photo montage	
8/28/2006	Lost Yunjin Kim & Daniel Dae Kim		
9/4/2006	NFL Preview		
9/11/2006	"Fall Preview"		
9/18/2006	Patrick Dempsey of Grey's Anatomy		
9/25/2006	Jorja Fox and William Petersen of CSI: Crime Scene Investigation		
10/2/2006	Lost Josh Holloway		
10/9/2006	Marcia Cross of Desperate Housewives		
10/16/2006	"Hot Fall TV List", featuring Eric Dane of Grey's Anatomy		
10/23/2006	Adrian Pasdar, Ali Larter and Milo Ventimiglia of Heroes		
10/30/2006	House Hugh Laurie, Omar Epps & Jennifer Morrison		
11/6/2006	John Stamos and Parminder Nagra of ER		
11/13/2006	Dancing with the Stars partners Cheryl Burke and Emmitt Smith, Karina Smirnoff and Mario Lopez, and Joey Lawrence and Edyta Śliwińska	Photograph	
11/20/2006	Eric Dane and Kate Walsh of Grey's Anatomy		
11/27/2006	David Boreanaz and Emily Deschanel of Bones		
12/4/2006	Melina Kanakaredes and Gary Sinise of CSI: NY		
12/11/2006	Josh Duhamel and Molly Sims of Las Vegas		
12/18/2006	"Best of 2006: My Big Year", featuring America Ferrera of Ugly Betty	Photograph	
**12/25/2006**	"Ultimate Holiday Preview", featuring Rachael Ray (TV Guide's first 2-week "double issue")	Photograph	

== 2007 ==
Issue date	Cover subject	Cover type	Artist
1/8/2007	"2007 TV Preview"	Photo montage	
1/15/2007	Kiefer Sutherland of 24	Photograph	
1/22/2007	Ryan Seacrest, Randy Jackson, Paula Abdul, and Simon Cowell of American Idol	Photograph	
1/29/2007	The cast of Heroes (multiple covers)	Photograph	
2/5/2007	Shemar Moore, Paget Brewster, Mandy Patinkin, and Thomas Gibson of Criminal Minds	Photograph	
2/12/2007	William Petersen of CSI: Crime Scene Investigation	Photograph	
2/19/2007	Oscar Preview, featuring host Ellen DeGeneres	Photograph	
2/26/2007	Rob Lowe and Calista Flockhart of Brothers & Sisters	Photograph	
3/5/2007	The cast of House	Photograph	
3/12/2007	Dominic Monaghan, Emilie de Ravin, and Henry Ian Cusick of Lost	Photograph	
3/19/2007	Paula Abdul of American Idol		
3/26/2007	"The Sexy Issue", featuring Evangeline Lilly and Patrick Dempsey (separate covers)	Photograph	
4/2/2007	Edie Falco and James Gandolfini of The Sopranos	Photograph	
4/9/2007	David Caruso of CSI: Miami	Photograph	
4/16/2007	Justin Chambers of Grey's Anatomy	Photograph	
4/23/2007	Eva Longoria of Desperate Housewives	Photograph	
4/30/2007	Jaime Pressly, Jason Lee, and Ethan Suplee of My Name Is Earl	Photograph	
5/7/2007	"Finale Fever Preview!" (4 covers) * David Caruso of CSI: Miami * Josh Holloway of Lost * Kiefer Sutherland of 24 * Hugh Laurie of House	Photograph	
5/14/2007	Dancing with the Stars couples Joey Fatone & Kym Johnson, Laila Ali & Maksim Chmerkovskiy, Apolo Anton Ohno & Julianne Hough, Ian Ziering & Cheryl Burke, and Billy Ray Cyrus & Karina Smirnoff	Photograph	
5/21/2007	American Idol contestants Blake Lewis, Jordin Sparks, and Melinda Doolittle	Photograph	
5/28/2007	Jorja Fox and William Petersen of CSI: Crime Scene Investigation	Photograph	
6/4/2007	Kyra Sedgwick of The Closer	Photograph	
6/11/2007	"The Sopranos: A Special Farewell to TV's Greatest Drama"	Photo montage	
6/18/2007	Prince William and Prince Harry		
**6/25/2007**	"NASCAR Goes Wild!" featuring Jeff Gordon		
7/9/2007	Paula Abdul of Hey Paula		
7/16/2007	Miley and Billy Ray Cyrus of Hannah Montana	Photograph	
**7/23/2007**	"The Ultimate Sci-Fi Preview", featuring Erica Durance and Tom Welling of Smallville	Photograph	
8/6/2007	Glenn Close of Damages	Photograph	
8/13/2007	"Family Fall Preview", featuring cast members from High School Musical 2		
8/20/2007	Mark Harmon of NCIS	Photograph	
8/27/2007	Kate Walsh and Tim Daly of Private Practice		
9/3/2007	NFL preview (multiple regional covers)	Photograph	
9/10/2007	Fall Preview	Photo montage	
9/17/2007	Patrick Dempsey of Grey's Anatomy	Photograph	
9/24/2007	Hugh Laurie of House	Photograph	
10/1/2007	Ali Larter, Hayden Panettiere, and Kristen Bell of Heroes	photo montage	
10/8/2007	Michelle Ryan of Bionic Woman		
10/15/2007	Cheryl Burke, Maksim Chmerkovskiy, and Julianne Hough of Dancing with the Stars	Photograph	
10/22/2007	Elizabeth Reaser and Justin Chambers of Grey's Anatomy	Photograph	
10/29/2007	William Petersen of CSI: Crime Scene Investigation and Anthony LaPaglia of Without a Trace		
11/5/2007	America Ferrera, Michael Urie, and Vanessa Williams of Ugly Betty	Photograph	
11/12/2007	The cast of Heroes (4 covers)	Illustration	
**11/19/2007**	Dancing with the Stars		
12/3/2007	Dana Delany of Desperate Housewives	Photograph	
12/10/2007	George Eads and Gary Dourdan of CSI: Crime Scene Investigation		
12/17/2007	"My Big Year", featuring Kate Walsh of Private Practice	Photograph	Rodolfo Martinez
**12/24/2007**	"Ultimate Holiday TV Preview", featuring Christina Applegate in a New Years-themed photo	Photograph	Adam Olszewski

== 2008 ==
Issue date	Cover subject	Cover type	Artist
1/7/2008	2008 TV Preview		
1/14/2008	Paula Abdul, Ryan Seacrest, Simon Cowell, and Randy Jackson of American Idol	Photograph	
1/21/2008	"Ultimate Sci-Fi Preview", featuring Thomas Dekker, Lena Headey, and Summer Glau of Terminator: The Sarah Connor Chronicles	Photograph	Frank Ockenfels
1/28/2008	The return of Lost: * Terry O'Quinn and Michael Emerson * Josh Holloway		
2/4/2008	Olivia Wilde, Lisa Edelstein, Jennifer Morrison, and Hugh Laurie of House	Photograph	
2/11/2008	NASCAR preview, featuring Dale Earnhardt Jr.		
2/18/2008	Oscar Preview		
2/25/2008	Jamie Oliver, Nate Berkus, Oprah Winfrey, Malaak Compton-Rock, and Tony Gonzalez of Oprah's Big Give	Photograph	
3/3/2008	"The Must-See Election"		
3/10/2008	Naveen Andrews and Elizabeth Mitchell of Lost	Photograph	
3/17/2008	American Idol		
3/24/2008	* Josh Radnor of How I Met Your Mother with guest star Britney Spears (newsstand cover) *"How Far Can TV Go?" featuring Jonathan Rhys Meyers and Natalie Dormer of The Tudors (subscriber cover)	Photograph	
**3/31/2008**	"Look Who's Back!" A group photo featuring Mariska Hargitay, David Caruso, Hugh Laurie, James Denton, Poppy Montgomery, Shemar Moore, Allison Mack, Mekhi Phifer, David Boreanaz, Becki Newton, Dave Annable, and Eva Longoria (foldout cover)	Photograph	Adam Olszewski
4/14/2008	Jenna Fischer, Rainn Wilson, and John Krasinski of The Office	Photograph	
4/21/2008	Christopher Meloni and Mariska Hargitay of Law & Order: Special Victims Unit	Photograph	
4/28/2008	Mark Harmon of NCIS	Photograph	
5/5/2008	"The Sexiest Man and Woman on TV," respectively Patrick Dempsey of Grey's Anatomy and Jennifer Love Hewitt of Ghost Whisperer (separate covers)	Photograph	
5/12/2008	Dancing with the Stars partners Kristi Yamaguchi and Mark Ballas, Edyta Śliwińska and Jason Taylor, Cheryl Burke and Cristián de la Fuente, Karina Smirnoff and Mario, and Marissa Jaret Winokur and Tony Dovolani	Photograph	Jonathan Skow
5/19/2008	American Idol contestants Syesha Mercado, David Cook, and David Archuleta	Photograph	
5/26/2008	Lost		
6/2/2008	"Finale Fallout", featuring Hugh Laurie of House		
6/9/2008	"Summer Preview", featuring Kyra Sedgwick	Photograph	
6/16/2008	The Jonas Brothers and Demi Lovato	Photograph	
6/23/2008	"Reality TV Attacks!" featuring Denise Richards	Photograph	
**6/30/2008**	"Hot Bods!" featuring Mario Lopez and Audrina Patridge	Photograph	
7/14/2008	David Duchovny and Gillian Anderson of the film The X-Files: I Want to Believe	photo illustration	
**7/21/2008**	Miley Cyrus	Photograph	
8/4/2008	Jon Hamm and January Jones of Mad Men	Photograph	
8/11/2008	Characters from Star Wars: The Clone Wars (4 covers)	Illustration	
8/25/2008	Patrick Dempsey and Ellen Pompeo of Grey's Anatomy (separate covers)	Photograph	Bob D'Amico/ABC
9/1/2008	The Hills (2 covers) * Heidi Montag and Spencer Pratt * Lo Bosworth, Lauren Conrad, and Audrina Patridge	Photograph	
9/8/2008	Fall Preview part 1 ("102 New Shows"), featuring Rufus Sewell, Simon Baker, Christian Slater, Joshua Jackson, and Jason O'Mara	Photograph	Rodolfo Martinez
9/15/2008	Fall Preview part 2 ("Returning Favorites"), with Brooke Shields, Kate Walsh, Julia Louis-Dreyfus, and Emily Deschanel	Photograph	Rodolfo Martinez
9/22/2008	Hayden Panettiere, Masi Oka, and Zachary Quinto of Heroes		
9/29/2008	The cast of Desperate Housewives (foldout cover)	Photograph	
10/6/2008	William Petersen and Marg Helgenberger of CSI: Crime Scene Investigation	Photograph	
10/13/2008	Robert Sean Leonard and Hugh Laurie of House	Photograph	
10/20/2008	Anna Torv and Joshua Jackson of Fringe	Photograph	
10/27/2008	Alec Baldwin and Tina Fey of 30 Rock	Photograph	
11/3/2008	Saturday Night Live's Fred Armisen as "Barack Obama" and Darrell Hammond as "John McCain"	Photograph	
11/10/2008	Christina Applegate of Samantha Who?	Photograph	
11/17/2008	Kiefer Sutherland of 24	Photograph	
**11/24/2008**	"The Hot List", featuring Simon Baker of The Mentalist	Photograph	Rodolfo Martinez
12/8/2008	Anna Belknap, Carmine Giovinazzo, and Melina Kanakaredes of CSI: NY	Photograph	
12/15/2008	"2009 Sci-Fi Preview", featuring Hayden Panettiere of Heroes	Photograph	
**12/22/2008**	"The Best of 2008", featuring a holiday-themed cover with Cobie Smulders, Alyson Hannigan, and Neil Patrick Harris	Photograph	Adam Olszewski

== 2009 ==
Issue date	Cover subject	Cover type	Artist
1/5/2009	"2009 Preview", featuring Kiefer Sutherland of 24	Photograph	
1/12/2009	William Petersen of CSI: Crime Scene Investigation	Photograph	
1/19/2009	Evangeline Lilly of Lost	Photograph	
**1/26/2009**	Barack & Michelle Obama	Photograph	
2/9/2009	Kate Walsh of Private Practice and Eric Dane of Grey's Anatomy	Photograph	
**2/16/2009**	"The Future of TV: Welcome to NewTube!" featuring Andy Samberg peering over a crystal ball	Photograph	
3/2/2009	Cheryl Burke of Dancing With the Stars	Photograph	
3/9/2009	David Boreanaz and Emily Deschanel of Bones	Photograph	
3/16/2009	The finale of Battlestar Galactica (2 covers) * James Callis, Tricia Helfer, and Katee Sackhoff * Edward James Olmos and Mary McDonnell	Photograph	
3/23/2009	The finale of ER (2 covers) * Linda Cardellini and John Stamos * George Clooney and Julianna Margulies (reprint of 10/14/1995 cover)	Photograph	
**3/30/2009**	"TV's 35 Sexiest Stars", featuring Simon Baker and Eva Longoria (separate covers)	Photograph	Baker: Cliff Watts; Longoria: Matt Jones
4/13/2009	Amy Poehler of Parks and Recreation	Photograph	
**4/20/2009**	Nicollette Sheridan	Photograph	
5/4/2009	Simon Cowell of American Idol		
5/11/2009	Cote de Pablo and Michael Weatherly of NCIS	Photograph	
**5/18/2009**	Dancing with the Stars couples Melissa Rycroft & Tony Dovolani, Shawn Johnson & Mark Ballas, Chelsie Hightower & Ty Murray, and Gilles Marini & Cheryl Burke (foldout cover)	Photograph	Jonathan Skow
**6/1/2009**	"Summer Preview", featuring Conan O'Brien of The Tonight Show	Photograph	
**6/15/2009**	Anna Paquin and Stephen Moyer of True Blood	Photograph	
**6/29/2009**	Jeffrey Donovan and Gabrielle Anwar of Burn Notice	Photograph	
**7/13/2009**	Remembering Farrah Fawcett	Photograph	
**7/27/2009**	*"Sci-Fi Preview", featuring Johnny Galecki, Jim Parsons, and Kaley Cuoco of The Big Bang Theory (newsstand cover); *Remembering Walter Cronkite (subscriber cover)	Photograph	*Theory: Adam Olszewski; *Cronkite: CBS
**8/10/2009**	"Who Earns What? TV's Biggest Paychecks Revealed!"	Photo Montage	
**8/24/2009**	"Fall Sneak Peek", featuring Laura Leighton and Ashlee Simpson-Wentz of Melrose Place	Photograph	
9/7/2009	Fall Preview ("The scoop on 42 new shows!")	Photo Montage	
9/14/2009	"Returning Favorites" issue, featuring Hugh Laurie of House	Photograph	
9/21/2009	Robin Tunney and Simon Baker of The Mentalist	Photograph	
9/28/2009	Marg Helgenberger & Jorja Fox of CSI: Crime Scene Investigation	Photograph	
10/5/2009	Chris O'Donnell and LL Cool J of NCIS: Los Angeles	Photograph	
10/12/2009	Mariska Hargitay and Christopher Meloni of Law & Order: Special Victims Unit	Photograph	
10/19/2009	Omar Epps, Jennifer Morrison, Hugh Laurie, and Jesse Spencer of House	Photograph	
10/26/2009	Patrick Dempsey of Grey's Anatomy	Photograph	
11/2/2009	Mark Harmon and Cote de Pablo of NCIS	Photograph	Jim Wright
11/9/2009	"Sesame Street Turns 40", featuring Muppet characters from the show	Photograph	
11/16/2009	"The 2009 Hot List", featuring Courteney Cox of Cougar Town	Photograph	
**11/23/2009**	Joseph Fiennes and Sonya Walger of FlashForward	Photograph	Smallz & Raskind
**12/7/2009**	The 20th anniversary of The Simpsons, featuring images of Homer Simpson from previous episodes (5 covers)	Illustration	Animation: Matt Groening; Illustration: Julius Preite
**12/21/2009**	*"Cheers & Jeers 2009: Our Picks for the Best and Worst of the Year" (newsstand cover) *"Tributes: Remembering the Stars We Lost in 2009" (subscriber cover)	Photo Montage	

== Sources ==
- The TV Guide magazine website
- 2000s section of the TV Guide cover archive
- TV Guide: Fifty Years of Television, New York: Crown Publishers, 2002. ISBN 1-4000-4685-8
- Stephen Hofer, ed., TV Guide: The Official Collectors Guide, Braintree, Massachusetts: BangZoom Publishers, 2006. ISBN 0-9772927-1-1.
- "50 Greatest TV Guide Covers", article from the June 15, 2002 edition of TV Guide
- Information from ellwanger.tv's TV Guide collection section
- TV Guide cover list as shown on pastpaper.com
