= Bob Guiney =

American television personality (born 1971)

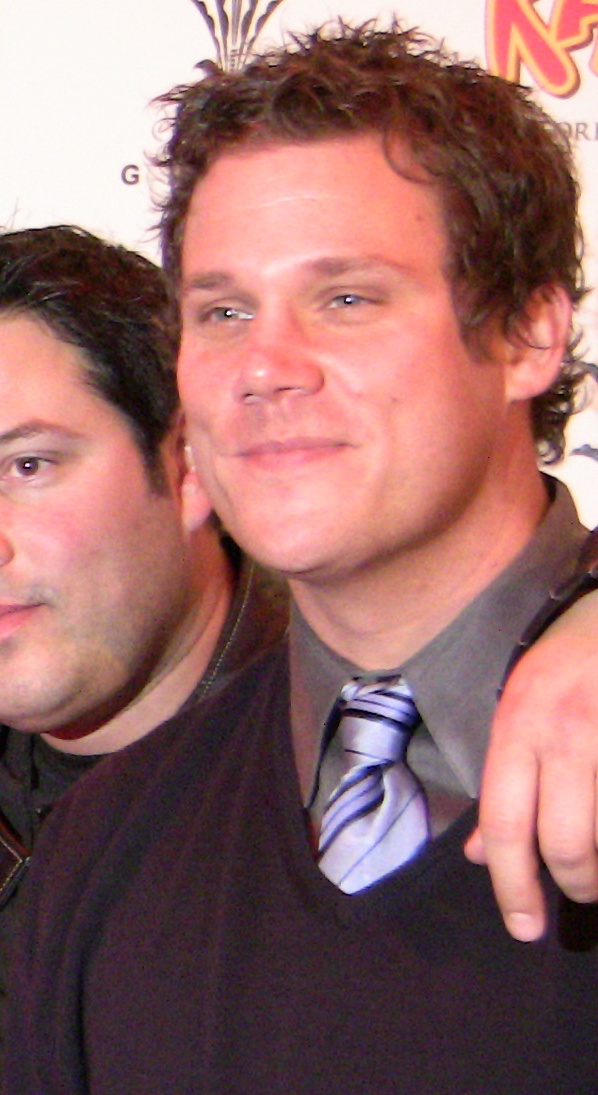
- Guiney in 2008
- Born: Robert Guiney; May 8, 1971 (age 55); Riverview, Michigan, U.S.
- Occupations: Television personality, mortgage broker
- Years active: 2003–present
- Spouse(s): Rebecca Budig (m. 2004; div. 2010) Jessica Canyon (m. 2016)

Robert Guiney (born May 8, 1971) is an American television personality and insurance carrier consultant for Lincoln Financial. He was a contestant on the first season of The Bachelorette and later, appeared as the bachelor in the fourth season of The Bachelor. He hosted GSN Live from 2009 until the show's ending in 2012.

== Life and career ==
Guiney was born in Riverview, Michigan. He is a 1989 graduate of Riverview Community High School. In 1993, he graduated from Michigan State University, where he was a member of the Alpha Tau Omega fraternity and a walk-on quarterback for Michigan State University's football team.

He started his own branch of a mortgage company, Allied Home Mortgage, with a childhood friend in 1999.

== Personal life ==
Guiney's first appearance on reality television was as a contestant on The Bachelorette, where he was ultimately eliminated by Trista. Although she failed to give him a rose to advance, the two remained friends, and he was invited to her wedding to the winner Ryan Sutter. His popularity on The Bachelorette led to his being cast in 2003 as the bachelor on the fourth season of The Bachelor. He was the show’s first divorced lead. In the finale, Guiney chose Estella Gardinier, a California mortgage broker, but they broke up soon after the show aired.

Only a few months later, in July 2004, Guiney married All My Children actress Rebecca Budig at his family's home in Long Lake, Michigan.

Also from Downriver, Michigan, Grosse Ile native Maria Gladowski, then an employee of Disney Consumer Products, engaged Guiney to participate in the worldwide celebration of Mickey Mouse's 75th birthday by asking him to design a 6 ft tall, 750 lb Mickey Mouse statue along with 74 other notable Disney legends, celebrities and sports figures, including Ben Affleck, Ellen Degeneres, Elton John, Kevin Garnett and Tony Hawk. The statue, which showcases Mickey in a Detroit Tiger's uniform and is titled "Good Catch" as a nod to his days on "The Bachelor," debuted at Walt Disney World and then traveled the country before it was auctioned by Sotheby's in 2005 to benefit the charity of Guiney's choice. The statue was purchased by Olympia Entertainment for $8,000 to benefit Starr Commonwealth. To this day, it is proudly displayed at Detroit's Comerica Park, home of the Detroit Tigers. Joining Guiney in the celebration, Detroit native and film and television producer Jerry Bruckheimer's "Slapstick Mouse" showcased Mickey as a Detroit Red Wing and sold for $11,000 to benefit Ilitch Charities for Children.

On January 13, 2010, People Magazine reported that Guiney and Budig had decided to split. In April 2010, Budig filed for divorce. On Friday, July 23, 2010, the divorce was finalized with neither side requesting spousal support or any other financial assistance. They had no children together.

In 2016 Guiney announced he was getting married for the third time to Jessica Canyon. The wedding took place on November 11, 2016 in Punta Mita, Mexico on his father's birthday. His brother-in-law JD DeMare got ordained to marry Guiney and Canyon.

Prior to The Bachelor, Guiney was in a Lansing, Michigan-based band called "Fat Amy". The band split up in 2000 but reunited as the Bob Guiney Band to record the album 3 Sides, which was released in 2003. The album entered the Nielsen SoundScan album chart at 114 but by November 30, only around 21,000 copies had been sold and by December 7 the album dropped out of the chart's top 200 list.

Guiney published a book in 2003, titled What a Difference a Year Makes: How Life's Unexpected Setbacks Can Lead to Unexpected Joy, describing his life leading up to his appearance on The Bachelorette, and the lessons he learned from his family and friends as he went through a divorce in the previous year.

Guiney also performs with the Band from TV, a band of actors from various American television shows who donate the proceeds of their performances and recordings to charities of their choice. Members of the band include Greg Grunberg, James Denton, Hugh Laurie, Adrian Pasdar, Scott Grimes, Andy Patalan and Jesse Spencer. Guiney currently hosts a real estate makeover show, Date My House for TLC.

Preceded by Andrew Firestone	The Bachelor; Season 4	Succeeded by Jesse Palmer
