= The Bachelorette (American TV series) season 1 =

The Bachelorette
- Season 1
- Promotional poster
- Starring: Trista Rehn
- Presented by: Chris Harrison
- No. of contestants: 25
- Winner: Ryan Sutter
- Runner-up: Charlie Maher
- No. of episodes: 7 (including 1 special)

Release
- Original network: ABC
- Original release: January 8 – February 19, 2003

Season chronology
- Next → Season 2

The Bachelorette was the first season of ABC reality television series The Bachelorette. The season premiered on January 8, 2003, and featured 29-year-old Trista Rehn, a pediatric physical therapist and former Miami Heat dancer from Indiana.

Rehn was the runner-up from the first season of The Bachelor featuring Alex Michel. The season concluded on February 19, 2003, with Rehn accepting a proposal from 28-year-old firefighter Ryan Sutter. They married on December 6, 2003 in Santa Monica, California, and currently live in Vail, Colorado with their two children.

== Contestants ==
The following is the list of bachelors for this season:

Name	Age	Hometown	Job	Eliminated
Ryan Sutter	28	Vail, Colorado	Firefighter	Winner
Charlie Maher	28	Hermosa Beach, California	Financial Analyst	Runner-up
Russell Woods	31	San Rafael, California	Writer	Week 5
Greg Todtman	28	Manhattan, New York	Importer	Week 4
Bob Guiney	31	Ferndale, Michigan	Mortgage Broker	Week 3
Jamie Blyth	27	Chicago, Illinois	Professional Basketball Player	Week 3
Mike Cousino	24	Cincinnati, Ohio	Sales and Consulting	Week 3
Rob Fayard	29	Dallas, Texas	Computer Programmer	Week 3
Brian Ching	28	Dallas, Texas	Mortgage Broker	Week 2
Brian Sander	28	Dallas, Texas	Sales Engineer	Week 2
Brook Pemberton	29	Dallas, Texas	Rodeo Cowboy	Week 2
Jack French	27	Pepper Pike, Ohio	Firefighter	Week 2
Jeff Popovich	25	San Diego, California	Professional Football Player	Week 2
Josh Krone	31	Boca Raton, Florida	Radio Advertising Executive	Week 2
Brian Hrouda	30	Cleveland, Ohio	National Sales Manager	Week 2 (Quit)
Billy Peralta	28	Hermosa Beach, California	Firefighter	Week 1
Brian K.	31	San Francisco, California	Breast Implant Sales	Week 1
Chris Tunnessen	35	Sugarloaf, Pennsylvania	V.P. of Auto Parts Company	Week 1
Duane Ruzynski	28	Chisago City, Minnesota	Flight Instructor	Week 1
Eric Davis	33	St. Louis, Missouri	Commercial Pilot	Week 1
Gregg Holland	34	Freehold, New Jersey	Marble Company Owner	Week 1
Matt Swogger	42	Marina Del Rey, California	Gym Owner	Week 1
Paul Kanoho	26	Honolulu, Hawaii	Telecommunications	Week 1
Peter Dizdar	25	Great Neck, New York	Construction Business Owner	Week 1
Wayne Johnson	37	Sacramento, California	Commercial Pilot	Week 1

=== Future appearances ===
==== The Bachelor ====
Bob Guiney was chosen to be the Bachelor in the fourth season of The Bachelor.

==== Dancing with the Stars ====
Rehn (now Sutter) competed in the very first season of Dancing with the Stars paired with professional dancer Louis Van Amstel. She was eliminated in week 1, finished in 6th place.

==== Other appearances ====
Ryan Sutter competed in the Reality Stars special of Fear Factor. Rehn made a special appearance.

== Elimination chart ==
#	Contestants	Week					
#	Contestants	1	2	3	4	5	6
1	Jamie	Russell	Charlie	Charlie	Ryan	Ryan	Ryan
2	Rob	Greg T.	Bob	Russell	Charlie	Charlie	Charlie
3	Chris	Ryan	Greg T.	Ryan	Russell	Russell	
4	Jack	Brian C.	Ryan	Greg T.	Greg T.		
5	Brian S.	Brook	Mike	Bob; Jamie; Mike; Rob			
6	Eric	Mike	Rob	Bob; Jamie; Mike; Rob			
7	Greg T.	Brian S.	Jamie	Bob; Jamie; Mike; Rob			
8	Matt	Jack	Russell	Bob; Jamie; Mike; Rob			
9	Ryan	Charlie	Brian C. Brian S. Brook; Jack; Jeff; Josh				
10	Brook	Josh	Brian C. Brian S. Brook; Jack; Jeff; Josh				
11	Peter	Brian H.	Brian C. Brian S. Brook; Jack; Jeff; Josh				
12	Brian H.	Jamie	Brian C. Brian S. Brook; Jack; Jeff; Josh				
13	Russell	Rob	Brian C. Brian S. Brook; Jack; Jeff; Josh				
14	Paul	Jeff	Brian C. Brian S. Brook; Jack; Jeff; Josh				
15	Brian K.	Bob	Brian H.				
16	Bob	Billy; Brian K. Chris; Duane; Eric; Gregg H. Matt; Paul; Peter; Wayne					
17	Billy	Billy; Brian K. Chris; Duane; Eric; Gregg H. Matt; Paul; Peter; Wayne					
18	Duane	Billy; Brian K. Chris; Duane; Eric; Gregg H. Matt; Paul; Peter; Wayne					
19	Gregg H.	Billy; Brian K. Chris; Duane; Eric; Gregg H. Matt; Paul; Peter; Wayne					
20	Brian C.	Billy; Brian K. Chris; Duane; Eric; Gregg H. Matt; Paul; Peter; Wayne					
21	Jeff	Billy; Brian K. Chris; Duane; Eric; Gregg H. Matt; Paul; Peter; Wayne					
22	Josh	Billy; Brian K. Chris; Duane; Eric; Gregg H. Matt; Paul; Peter; Wayne					
23	Mike	Billy; Brian K. Chris; Duane; Eric; Gregg H. Matt; Paul; Peter; Wayne					
24	Wayne	Billy; Brian K. Chris; Duane; Eric; Gregg H. Matt; Paul; Peter; Wayne					
25	Charlie	Billy; Brian K. Chris; Duane; Eric; Gregg H. Matt; Paul; Peter; Wayne					

The contestant won the competition
The contestant was on a group date
The contestant was on a one-on-one date
The contestant went on a group date and was eliminated at the rose ceremony
The contestant quit the competition
The contestant was eliminated at the rose ceremony

== Episodes ==
No. overall	No. in season	Title	Original release date	Prod. code	U.S. viewers (millions)	Rating/share (18–49)
1	1	"Week 1"	January 8, 2003	101	17.40	8.4/20
2	2	"Week 2"	January 15, 2003	102	17.40	8.5/20
3	3	"Week 3"	January 22, 2003	103	13.40	6.0/14
4	4	"Week 4"	January 29, 2003	104	14.00	6.5/15
5	5	"Week 5"	February 5, 2003	105	17.30	8.2/19
6	6	"The Men Tell All"	February 12, 2003	N/A	17.20	8.2/20
7	7	"Week 6"	February 19, 2003	106	20.40	9.3/22
