= The Bachelorette (American TV series) season 2 =

The Bachelorette
- Season 2
- Starring: Meredith Phillips
- Presented by: Chris Harrison
- No. of contestants: 25
- Winner: Ian McKee
- Runner-up: Matthew Hickl
- No. of episodes: 9 (including 2 specials)

Release
- Original network: ABC
- Original release: January 14 – February 26, 2004

Season chronology
- ← Previous; Season 1 Next → Season 3

The second season of The Bachelorette, an ABC reality television series, premiered on January 14, 2004. This season featured 28-year-old Meredith Phillips, a makeup artist from Portland, Oregon.

Phillips finished in third place on season 4 of The Bachelor featuring Bob Guiney. The season concluded on February 26, 2004, with Phillips accepting a proposal from 28-year-old equity research salesman Ian McKee. They ended their engagement in February 2005.

== Contestants ==
Name	Age	Hometown	Occupation	Outcome
Ian McKee	29	New York, New York	Equity Research Salesman	Winner
Matthew Hickl	28	Friendswood, Texas	Pharmaceutical Sales Rep	Episode 8
Chad Schlee	31	Buffalo, New York	Pharmaceutical Sales Rep	Episode 6
Lanny Lawrence	26	Aubrey, Texas	Stallion and Breeding Manager	Episode 5
Brad Andrzejewski	29	Grand Rapids, Michigan	Pharmaceutical Sales Rep	Episode 4
Ryan Morelli	30	Santa Barbara, California	Financial Advisor	Episode 4
Sean Denham	31	Wall, New Jersey	Certified Public Accountant	Episode 4
Rick Enrico	29	San Diego, California	Business Manager	Episode 3
Ryan Reeve	29	Wynola, California	Sales/Marketing	Episode 3
Todd Hedrick	36	San Francisco, California	Options Trader	Episode 3
Damon Bowers	28	Cardiff, California	Arena Football Player	Episode 2
Eliot Wheeler	25	Mountain View, California	Options Trader	Episode 2
Harold Hersh	29	Rock Island, Illinois	Professional Hockey Player	Episode 2
Marcus Pierce	26	Los Angeles, California	Personal Trainer	Episode 2
Robert Townsend	32	El Segundo, California	Alliance Development	Episode 2
Aaron Visger	32	Sacramento, California	Title and Escrow Sales	Episode 1
Andy Chang	33	Dallas, Texas	Dentist	Episode 1
Anselm Clinard	32	Venice, California	Art Designer	Episode 1
Brian Holden	31	Quincy, Massachusetts	Attorney	Episode 1
Chris Ritter	31	Boston, Massachusetts	Accountant	Episode 1
Cory Higgins	24	Long Beach Island, New Jersey	Small Business Owner	Episode 1
Jeff O'Quinn	30	Macon, Georgia	Pharmaceutical Sales Rep	Episode 1
Justin Sherrod	25	Orlando, Florida	Professional Baseball Player	Episode 1
Keith Kormanik	31	Baltimore, Maryland	Financial Analyst	Episode 1
Trever Kalan	35	North Wales, Pennsylvania	Restaurateur	Episode 1

== Call-out order ==
Meredith's call-out order
#	Bachelors	Episodes						
#	Bachelors	1	2	3	4	5	6	8
1	Matthew	Harold	Rick	Ian	Chad	Ian	Matthew	Ian
2	Rick	Todd	Todd	Sean	Ian	Matthew	Ian	Matthew
3	Lanny	Marcus	Chad	Chad	Lanny	Chad	Chad	
4	Justin	Brad	Brad	Ryan M.	Matthew	Lanny		
5	Sean	Ryan M.	Sean	Brad	Brad; Ryan M. Sean			
6	Ryan R.	Ian	Lanny	Matthew	Brad; Ryan M. Sean			
7	Brian	Chad	Ryan R.	Lanny	Brad; Ryan M. Sean			
8	Damon	Lanny	Matthew	Rick; Ryan R. Todd				
9	Keith	Robert	Ian	Rick; Ryan R. Todd				
10	Cory	Sean	Ryan M.	Rick; Ryan R. Todd				
11	Chad	Ryan R.	Damon; Eliot; Harold; Marcus; Robert					
12	Andy	Damon	Damon; Eliot; Harold; Marcus; Robert					
13	Todd	Eliot	Damon; Eliot; Harold; Marcus; Robert					
14	Eliot	Matthew	Damon; Eliot; Harold; Marcus; Robert					
15	Aaron	Rick	Damon; Eliot; Harold; Marcus; Robert					
16	Marcus	Aaron; Andy; Anselm; Brian; Chris; Cory; Jeff; Justin; Keith; Trever						
17	Harold	Aaron; Andy; Anselm; Brian; Chris; Cory; Jeff; Justin; Keith; Trever						
18	Jeff	Aaron; Andy; Anselm; Brian; Chris; Cory; Jeff; Justin; Keith; Trever						
19	Chris	Aaron; Andy; Anselm; Brian; Chris; Cory; Jeff; Justin; Keith; Trever						
20	Brad	Aaron; Andy; Anselm; Brian; Chris; Cory; Jeff; Justin; Keith; Trever						
21	Robert	Aaron; Andy; Anselm; Brian; Chris; Cory; Jeff; Justin; Keith; Trever						
22	Trever	Aaron; Andy; Anselm; Brian; Chris; Cory; Jeff; Justin; Keith; Trever						
23	Anselm	Aaron; Andy; Anselm; Brian; Chris; Cory; Jeff; Justin; Keith; Trever						
24	Ryan M.	Aaron; Andy; Anselm; Brian; Chris; Cory; Jeff; Justin; Keith; Trever						
25	Ian	Aaron; Andy; Anselm; Brian; Chris; Cory; Jeff; Justin; Keith; Trever						

- Episode 7 was a special "Men Tell All" episode.

The contestant was eliminated at the rose ceremony
The contestant won the competition

== Meredith Phillips ==
Meredith Phillips is a make-up artist, model, and former contestant on the fourth season of ABC's The Bachelor. After the show, she published Date Night Cookbook.

== Episodes ==
No. overall	No. in season	Title	Original release date	Prod. code	U.S. viewers (millions)	Rating/share (18–49)
8	1	"Week 1"	January 14, 2004	201	12.40	5.6/13
9	2	"Week 2"	January 21, 2004	202	11.56	5.2/12
10	3	"Week 3"	January 28, 2004	203	11.10	5.0/13
11	4	"Week 4"	February 4, 2004	204	9.00	4.1/10
12	5	"Week 5"	February 11, 2004	205	11.30	5.1/12
13	6	"Week 6"	February 18, 2004	206	11.33	5.1/12
14	7	"The Men Tell All"	February 19, 2004	N/A	6.08	N/A
15	8	"Week 7"	February 25, 2004	207	13.53	6.2/15
16	9	"After the Final Rose"	February 26, 2004	N/A	7.17	N/A
