= List of The Bachelorette (American TV series) episodes =

The Bachelorette is an American dating reality television series created for ABC by Mike Fleiss. It was originally hosted by Chris Harrison, and is now hosted by Jesse Palmer and is a spin-off of The Bachelor. The series is produced by Next Entertainment and Warner Horizon Television, and revolves around a single bachelorette who starts with a pool of romantic interests from whom she is expected to select a husband. During the course of the season, the bachelorette eliminates candidates, culminating in a marriage proposal from her final selection. The participants travel to romantic and exotic locations for their adventures, and the conflicts in the series, both internal and external, stem from the elimination-style format of the show. In September 2025, ABC renewed the series for a twenty-second season which was set to premiere on March 22, 2026, however, it was pulled out from the schedule three days before due to air. The twenty-first season is the most recent aired season in the series.

As of September 3, 2024, 234 episodes of The Bachelorette have aired, including five specials, concluding the twenty-first season.

== Series overview ==
Season	Bachelorette(s)	Episodes	Originally released	
Season	Bachelorette(s)	Episodes	First released	Last released
1	Trista Sutter	7	January 8, 2003	February 19, 2003
2	Meredith Phillips	9	January 14, 2004	February 26, 2004
3	Jennifer Schefft	9	January 10, 2005	February 28, 2005
4	DeAnna Pappas	11	May 19, 2008	July 8, 2008
5	Jillian Harris	12	May 18, 2009	July 28, 2009
6	Ali Fedotowsky	12	May 24, 2010	August 2, 2010
7	Ashley Hebert	12	May 23, 2011	August 1, 2011
8	Emily Maynard	12	May 14, 2012	July 22, 2012
9	Desiree Hartsock	12	May 27, 2013	August 5, 2013
10	Andi Dorfman	13	May 19, 2014	July 28, 2014
11	Kaitlyn Bristowe	13	May 18, 2015	July 27, 2015
12	JoJo Fletcher	12	May 23, 2016	August 1, 2016
13	Rachel Lindsay	11	May 22, 2017	August 7, 2017
14	Becca Kufrin	11	May 28, 2018	August 6, 2018
15	Hannah Brown	13	May 13, 2019	July 30, 2019
16	Clare Crawley; Tayshia Adams	13	October 13, 2020	December 22, 2020
17	Katie Thurston	10	June 7, 2021	August 9, 2021
18	Michelle Young	11	October 19, 2021	December 21, 2021
19	Rachel Recchia; Gabby Windey	12	July 11, 2022	September 20, 2022
20	Charity Lawson	9	June 26, 2023	August 21, 2023
21	Jenn Tran	10	July 8, 2024	September 3, 2024
22	Taylor Frankie Paul	—N/a	10	—N/a

== Episodes ==
=== Season 1 (2003) ===
No. overall	No. in season	Title	Original release date	Prod. code	U.S. viewers (millions)	Rating/share (18–49)
1	1	"Week 1"	January 8, 2003	101	17.40	8.4/20
2	2	"Week 2"	January 15, 2003	102	17.40	8.5/20
3	3	"Week 3"	January 22, 2003	103	13.40	6.0/14
4	4	"Week 4"	January 29, 2003	104	14.00	6.5/15
5	5	"Week 5"	February 5, 2003	105	17.30	8.2/19
6	6	"The Men Tell All"	February 12, 2003	N/A	17.20	8.2/20
7	7	"Week 6"	February 19, 2003	106	20.40	9.3/22

=== Season 2 (2004) ===
No. overall	No. in season	Title	Original release date	Prod. code	U.S. viewers (millions)	Rating/share (18–49)
8	1	"Week 1"	January 14, 2004	201	12.40	5.6/13
9	2	"Week 2"	January 21, 2004	202	11.56	5.2/12
10	3	"Week 3"	January 28, 2004	203	11.10	5.0/13
11	4	"Week 4"	February 4, 2004	204	9.00	4.1/10
12	5	"Week 5"	February 11, 2004	205	11.30	5.1/12
13	6	"Week 6"	February 18, 2004	206	11.33	5.1/12
14	7	"The Men Tell All"	February 19, 2004	N/A	6.08	N/A
15	8	"Week 7"	February 25, 2004	207	13.53	6.2/15
16	9	"After the Final Rose"	February 26, 2004	N/A	7.17	N/A

=== Season 3 (2005) ===
No. overall	No. in season	Title	Original release date	Prod. code	U.S. viewers (millions)	Rating/share (18–49)
17	1	"Week 1"	January 10, 2005	301	9.12	4.3/10
18	2	"Week 2"	January 17, 2005	302	8.33	3.7/8
19	3	"Week 3"	January 24, 2005	303	8.02	3.6/8
20	4	"Week 4"	January 31, 2005	304	8.98	4.0/9
21	5	"Week 5"	February 7, 2005	305	9.38	4.2/9
22	6	"Week 6"	February 14, 2005	306	8.21	3.5/8
23	7	"The Men Tell All"	February 21, 2005	N/A	8.96	4.0/9
24	8	"Week 7"	February 28, 2005	307	8.37	3.4/8
25	9	"After the Final Rose"	February 28, 2005	N/A	11.33	5.0/12

=== Season 4 (2008) ===
No. overall	No. in season	Title	Original release date	Prod. code	U.S. viewers (millions)	Rating/share (18–49)
26	1	"Week 1"	May 19, 2008	401	8.08	2.9/7
27	2	"Week 2"	May 26, 2008	402	5.59	2.0/5
28	3	"Week 3"	June 2, 2008	403	6.46	2.2/6
29	4	"Week 4"	June 9, 2008	404	6.35	2.2/7
30	5	"DeAnna Tells All"	June 16, 2008	N/A	5.90	1.8/6
31	6	"Week 5"	June 16, 2008	405	7.05	2.5/7
32	7	"Week 6"	June 23, 2008	406	7.52	2.5/8
33	8	"Week 7"	June 30, 2008	407	7.30	2.4/8
34	9	"The Men Tell All"	June 30, 2008	N/A	7.48	2.6/7
35	10	"Week 8"	July 7, 2008	408	9.53	3.4/10
36	11	"After the Final Rose"	July 7, 2008	N/A	9.90	3.7/10

=== Season 5 (2009) ===
No. overall	No. in season	Title	Original release date	Prod. code	U.S. viewers (millions)	Rating/share (18–49)
37	1	"Week 1"	May 18, 2009	501	8.69	3.0/8
38	2	"Week 2"	May 25, 2009	502	5.99	2.1/6
39	3	"Week 3"	June 1, 2009	503	6.41	2.2/6
40	4	"Week 4"	June 8, 2009	504	7.19	2.5/7
41	5	"Week 5"	June 15, 2009	505	6.76	2.4/7
42	6	"Week 6"	June 22, 2009	506	6.76	2.3/7
43	7	"Week 7"	June 29, 2009	507	7.94	2.7/5
44	8	"Week 8"	July 6, 2009	508	7.71	2.6/7
45	9	"Week 9"	July 13, 2009	509	8.01	2.7/8
46	10	"The Men Tell All"	July 20, 2009	N/A	8.04	2.8/9
47	11	"Week 10"	July 27, 2009	510	10.00	3.5/10
48	12	"After the Final Rose"	July 28, 2009	N/A	7.99	2.8/8

=== Season 6 (2010) ===
No. overall	No. in season	Title	Original release date	Prod. code	U.S. viewers (millions)	Rating/share (18–49)
49	1	"Week 1: Season Premiere"	May 24, 2010	601	9.08	2.8/8
50	2	"Week 2"	May 31, 2010	602	7.64	2.5/7
51	3	"Week 3"	June 7, 2010	603	7.91	2.6/8
52	4	"Week 4: New York City"	June 14, 2010	604	8.41	2.6/8
53	5	"Week 5: Iceland"	June 21, 2010	605	8.26	2.7/9
54	6	"Week 6: Istanbul, Turkey"	June 28, 2010	606	9.77	3.2/9
55	7	"Week 7: Portugal"	July 5, 2010	607	9.14	2.8/8
56	8	"Week 8: Hometowns"	July 12, 2010	608	9.64	3.1/9
57	9	"Week 9: Fantasy Suites"	July 19, 2010	609	10.07	3.4/10
58	10	"The Men Tell All"	July 26, 2010	N/A	8.87	2.9/9
59	11	"Week 10: Season Finale"	August 2, 2010	610	11.73	3.8/11
60	12	"After the Final Rose"	August 2, 2010	N/A	11.32	3.8/11

=== Season 7 (2011) ===
No. overall	No. in season	Title	Original release date	Prod. code	U.S. viewers (millions)	Rating/share (18–49)
61	1	"Week 1: Season Premiere"	May 23, 2011	701	9.02	2.8/7
62	2	"Week 2: Las Vegas"	May 30, 2011	702	7.23	2.2/6
63	3	"Week 3"	June 6, 2011	703	8.13	2.6/8
64	4	"Week 4: Phuket"	June 13, 2011	704	7.88	2.4/7
65	5	"Week 5: Chiang Mai"	June 20, 2011	705	7.76	2.3/7
66	6	"Week 6: Hong Kong"	June 27, 2011	706	8.27	2.6/8
67	7	"Week 7: Taiwan"	July 11, 2011	707	8.12	2.6/8
68	8	"Week 8: Hometowns"	July 18, 2011	708	8.00	2.3/7
69	9	"Week 9: Fantasy Suites"	July 25, 2011	709	8.16	2.4/7
70	10	"The Men Tell All"	July 31, 2011	N/A	5.55	1.7/4
71	11	"Week 10: Season Finale"	August 1, 2011	710	9.75	2.8/8
72	12	"After the Final Rose"	August 1, 2011	N/A	9.31	2.8/8

=== Season 8 (2012) ===
No. overall	No. in season	Title	Original release date	Prod. code	U.S. viewers (millions)	Rating/share (18–49)
73	1	"Week 1: Season Premiere"	May 14, 2012	801	8.05	2.6/7
74	2	"Week 2"	May 21, 2012	802	7.53	2.4/6
75	3	"Week 3"	May 28, 2012	803	5.79	1.9/5
76	4	"Week 4: Bermuda"	June 4, 2012	804	6.77	2.2/6
77	5	"Week 5: London"	June 11, 2012	805	7.43	2.3/7
78	6	"Week 6: Croatia"	June 18, 2012	806	7.04	2.3/7
79	7	"Week 7: Prague"	June 25, 2012	807	7.03	2.3/7
80	8	"Week 8: Hometowns"	July 2, 2012	808	7.49	2.5/8
81	9	"Week 9: Fantasy Suites"	July 9, 2012	809	8.11	2.5/7
82	10	"The Men Tell All"	July 16, 2012	N/A	7.16	2.2/6
83	11	"Week 10: Season Finale"	July 22, 2012	810	8.86	3.1/9
84	12	"After the Final Rose"	July 22, 2012	N/A	8.80	3.1/8

=== Season 9 (2013) ===
No. overall	No. in season	Title	Original release date	Prod. code	U.S. viewers (millions)	Rating/share (18–49)
85	1	"Week 1: Season Premiere"	May 27, 2013	901	5.99	1.9/5
86	2	"Week 2"	June 3, 2013	902	5.69	1.7/5
87	3	"Week 3"	June 10, 2013	903	5.76	1.8/5
88	4	"Week 4: Atlantic City"	June 17, 2013	904	5.47	1.7/5
89	5	"Week 5: Bavaria"	June 24, 2013	905	6.56	2.0/6
90	6	"Week 6: Barcelona"	July 1, 2013	906	6.34	1.8/6
91	7	"Week 7: Madeira"	July 8, 2013	907	6.88	1.9/6
92	8	"Week 8: Hometowns"	July 15, 2013	908	6.63	1.8/6
93	9	"The Men Tell All"	July 22, 2013	N/A	6.52	1.9/6
94	10	"Week 9: Fantasy Suites"	July 29, 2013	909	7.94	2.4/7
95	11	"Week 10: Season Finale"	August 5, 2013	910	8.94	2.6/8
96	12	"After the Final Rose"	August 12, 2013	N/A	8.31	2.5/7

=== Season 10 (2014) ===
No. overall	No. in season	Title	Original release date	Prod. code	U.S. viewers (millions)	Rating/share (18–49)
97	1	"Week 1: Season Premiere"	May 19, 2014	1001	7.17	2.0/6
98	2	"Week 2"	May 26, 2014	1002	6.03	1.6/5
99	3	"Week 3: Santa Barbara"	June 1, 2014	1003	5.02	1.4/4
100	4	"Week 4: Connecticut"	June 2, 2014	1004	6.74	1.8/6
101	5	"The Journey So Far"	June 9, 2014	N/A	4.48	1.0/4
102	6	"Week 5: Marseille, France"	June 16, 2014	1005	6.50	1.7/5
103	7	"Week 6: Venice, Italy"	June 23, 2014	1006	6.05	1.5/5
104	8	"Week 7: Belgium"	June 30, 2014	1007	6.48	1.6/6
105	9	"Week 8: Hometowns"	July 7, 2014	1008	6.99	1.8/6
106	10	"Week 9: Fantasy Suites"	July 14, 2014	1009	6.91	1.7/5
107	11	"The Men Tell All"	July 21, 2014	N/A	7.09	1.8/6
108	12	"Week 10: Season Finale"	July 28, 2014	1010	8.00	2.0/7
109	13	"After the Final Rose"	July 28, 2014	N/A	8.15	2.1/6

=== Season 11 (2015) ===
No. overall	No. in season	Title	Original release date	Prod. code	U.S. viewers (millions)	Rating/share (18–49)
110	1	"Week 1, Part 1: Season Premiere"	May 18, 2015	1101A	7.10	2.1/7
111	2	"Week 1, Part 2"	May 19, 2015	1101B	7.09	1.9/7
112	3	"Week 2"	May 25, 2015	1102	5.37	1.6/5
113	4	"Week 3"	June 1, 2015	1103	6.52	1.9/6
114	5	"Week 4: New York City"	June 8, 2015	1104	6.37	1.8/6
115	6	"Week 5: San Antonio, Texas"	June 15, 2015	1105	6.29	1.8/6
116	7	"Week 6: Dublin"	June 22, 2015	1106	6.64	2.0/7
117	8	"Week 7: Killarney"	June 29, 2015	1107	6.72	1.9/7
118	9	"Week 8: Fantasy Suites"	July 6, 2015	1108	7.05	2.0/7
119	10	"Week 9: Season Finale, Part 1"	July 13, 2015	1109	6.96	1.9/7
120	11	"The Men Tell All"	July 20, 2015	N/A	6.97	1.9/7
121	12	"Week 10: Season Finale, Part 2"	July 27, 2015	1110	8.13	2.5/9
122	13	"After the Final Rose"	July 27, 2015	N/A	7.94	2.3/8

=== Season 12 (2016) ===
No. overall	No. in season	Title	Original release date	Prod. code	U.S. viewers (millions)	Rating/share (18–49)
123	1	"Week 1: Season Premiere"	May 23, 2016	1201	6.63	2.0/7
124	2	"Week 2"	May 30, 2016	1202	5.94	1.6/5
125	3	"Week 3"	June 6, 2016	1203	6.90	2.0/7
126	4	"Week 4: Nemacolin"	June 7, 2016	1204	6.77	2.0/8
127	5	"Week 5: Uruguay"	June 20, 2016	1205	7.05	2.1/8
128	6	"Week 6: Buenos Aires"	June 27, 2016	1206	6.85	2.0/7
129	7	"Week 7: Mendoza"	July 11, 2016	1207	6.86	1.9/7
130	8	"Week 8: Hometowns"	July 18, 2016	1208	6.72	1.9/7
131	9	"Week 9: Fantasy Suites"	July 25, 2016	1209	6.38	1.9/7
132	10	"The Men Tell All"	July 26, 2016	N/A	5.14	1.4/5
133	11	"Week 10: Season Finale"	August 1, 2016	1210	8.57	2.5/9
134	12	"After the Final Rose"	August 1, 2016	N/A	8.10	2.3/9

=== Season 13 (2017) ===
No. overall	No. in season	Title	Original release date	Prod. code	U.S. viewers (millions)	Rating/share (18–49)
135	1	"Week 1: Season Premiere"	May 22, 2017	1301	5.66	1.8/6
136	2	"Week 2"	May 29, 2017	1302	5.68	1.5/6
137	3	"Week 3"	June 5, 2017	1303	6.04	1.7/6
138	4	"Week 4: Hilton Head, South Carolina"	June 19, 2017 (Note: The episode was originally scheduled to air on June 12, 2017, but ABC preempted it due to the ongoing of game 5 of the 2017 NBA Finals.)	1304	5.90	1.6/6
139	5	"Week 5: Norway"	June 26, 2017 (Note: The episode was originally scheduled to air on June 19, 2017, but having been preempted on the previous episode schedule of June 19.)	1305	5.39	1.4/6
140	6	"Week 6: Denmark"	June 27, 2017	1306	4.51	1.2/5
141	7	"Week 7: Switzerland"	July 10, 2017	1307	5.68	1.4/6
142	8	"Week 8: Hometowns"	July 17, 2017	1308	6.21	1.6/7
143	9	"Week 9: Fantasy Suites"	July 24, 2017	1309	6.43	1.6/7
144	10	"The Men Tell All"	July 31, 2017	N/A	5.76	1.5/6
145	11	"Week 10: Season Finale & After the Final Rose"	August 7, 2017	1310	7.57	2.1/8

=== Season 14 (2018) ===
No. overall	No. in season	Title	Original release date	Prod. code	U.S. viewers (millions)	Rating/share (18–49)
146	1	"Week 1: Season Premiere"	May 28, 2018	1401	5.50	1.4/5
147	2	"Week 2"	June 4, 2018	1402	5.81	1.6/7
148	3	"Week 3"	June 11, 2018	1403	5.49	1.4/6
149	4	"Week 4: Park City, Utah"	June 18, 2018	1404	5.70	1.4/6
150	5	"Week 5: Las Vegas"	June 25, 2018	1405	5.78	1.4/6
151	6	"Week 6: Richmond, Virginia"	July 2, 2018	1406	5.30	1.2/6
152	7	"Week 7: The Bahamas"	July 9, 2018	1407	5.68	1.4/6
153	8	"Week 8: Hometowns"	July 16, 2018	1408	6.31	1.6/7
154	9	"Week 9: Fantasy Suites"	July 23, 2018	1409	5.91	1.4/6
155	10	"The Men Tell All"	July 30, 2018	N/A	5.47	1.3/5
156	11	"Week 10: Season Finale & After the Final Rose"	August 6, 2018	1410	6.71	1.8/9

=== Season 15 (2019) ===
No. overall	No. in season	Title	Original release date	Prod. code	U.S. viewers (millions)	Rating/share (18–49)
157	1	"Week 1: Season Premiere"	May 13, 2019	1501	4.78	1.4/6
158	2	"Week 2"	May 20, 2019	1502	4.52	1.2/5
159	3	"Week 3"	May 27, 2019	1503	4.67	1.1/5
160	4	"Week 4: Newport, Rhode Island"	June 3, 2019	1504	5.51	1.5/7
161	5	"Week 5: Scotland"	June 11, 2019 (Note: The episode was intended to air on June 10, 2019 and it was moved to June 11, due to the game 5 of the 2019 NBA Finals.)	1505	4.75	1.3/7
162	6	"The Journey So Far"	June 17, 2019	1505B	5.53	1.5/7
163	7	"Week 6: Latvia"	June 24, 2019	1506	5.72	1.5/7
164	8	"Week 7: Amsterdam"	July 1, 2019	1507	5.71	1.5/8
165	9	"Week 8: Hometowns"	July 8, 2019	1508	6.04	1.5/8
166	10	"Week 9: Fantasy Suites"	July 15, 2019	1509	6.46	1.7/8
167	11	"The Men Tell All"	July 22, 2019	N/A	6.60	1.7/8
168	12	"Week 10: Season Finale"	July 29, 2019	1510A	7.22	1.9/9
169	13	"After the Final Rose"	July 30, 2019	1510B	7.48	2.1/10

=== Season 16 (2020) ===
No. overall	No. in season	Title	Original release date	Prod. code	U.S. viewers (millions)	Rating (18–49)
170	1	"Week 1: Season Premiere"	October 13, 2020	1601	5.03	1.4
171	2	"Week 2"	October 20, 2020	1602	4.29	1.2
172	3	"Week 3"	October 27, 2020	1603	4.60	1.3
173	4	"Clare Departs"	November 5, 2020 (Note: Episode was moved to Thursday, November 5, 2020, to accommodate special coverage from ABC News regarding updated 2020 United States presidential election results.)	1604	5.61	1.6
174	5	"Tayshia Arrives"	November 10, 2020	1605	5.30	1.7
175	6	"Week 4"	November 17, 2020	1606	4.67	1.4
176	7	"Week 5"	November 24, 2020	1607	4.47	1.3
177	8	"Week 6"	December 1, 2020	1608	4.33	1.2
178	9	"Week 7"	December 8, 2020	1609	4.32	1.2
179	10	"The Men Tell All"	December 14, 2020	1610	4.01	1.0
180	11	"Week 8: Hometowns"	December 15, 2020	1611	4.43	1.1
181	12	"Week 9: Fantasy Suites"	December 21, 2020	1612	4.95	1.2
182	13	"Week 10: Season Finale"	December 22, 2020	1613	5.52	1.4

=== Season 17 (2021) ===
No. overall	No. in season	Title	Original release date	Prod. code	U.S. viewers (millions)	Rating (18–49)
183	1	"Week 1: Season Premiere"	June 7, 2021	1701	3.77	1.0
184	2	"Week 2"	June 14, 2021	1702	3.32	0.9
185	3	"Week 3, Part 1"	June 21, 2021	1703	3.49	0.9
186	4	"Week 3, Part 2"	June 28, 2021	1704	3.32	0.8
187	5	"Week 4"	July 5, 2021	1705	3.52	0.8
188	6	"Week 5"	July 12, 2021	1706	3.72	0.9
189	7	"Week 6"	July 19, 2021	1707	3.87	0.9
190	8	"The Men Tell All"	July 26, 2021 (Note: Week 8: The Men Tell All and Week 9: Hometowns were aired during the 2020 Summer Olympics.)	1708	3.36	0.8
191	9	"Week 7: Hometowns"	August 2, 2021	1709	3.66	1.0
192	10	"Week 8: Season Finale & After the Final Rose"	August 9, 2021	1710	4.60	1.3

=== Season 18 (2021) ===
No. overall	No. in season	Title	Original release date	Prod. code	U.S. viewers (millions)	Rating (18–49)
193	1	"Week 1: Season Premiere"	October 19, 2021	1801	3.00	0.8/4
194	2	"Week 2"	October 26, 2021	1802	2.87	0.7/3
195	3	"Week 3"	November 2, 2021	1803	2.74	0.7/3
196	4	"Week 4"	November 9, 2021	1804	2.60	0.6/4
197	5	"Week 5"	November 16, 2021	1805	2.98	0.7
198	6	"Week 6"	November 23, 2021	1806	2.71	0.6/3
199	7	"Week 7: Hometowns"	November 30, 2021	1807	3.07	0.6/7
200	8	"The Men Tell All"	December 6, 2021	N/A	2.08	0.5/7
201	9	"Week 8: Fantasy Suites"	December 14, 2021	1808	3.29	0.7/5
202	10	"Week 9: Season Finale"	December 21, 2021	1809	3.50	0.7/3
203	11	"After the Final Rose"	December 21, 2021	N/A	2.93	0.6/2

=== Season 19 (2022) ===
No. overall	No. in season	Title	Original release date	Prod. code	U.S. viewers (millions)	Rating (18–49)
204	1	"Week 1: Season Premiere"	July 11, 2022	1901	2.98	0.7
205	2	"Week 2"	July 18, 2022	1902	3.01	0.7
206	3	"Week 3"	July 25, 2022	1903	3.19	0.7
207	4	"Week 4: France"	August 1, 2022	1904	3.11	0.7
208	5	"Week 5: Belgium"	August 8, 2022	1905	3.33	0.8
209	6	"Week 6: Amsterdam"	August 15, 2022	1906	3.29	0.8
210	7	"Week 7: Hometowns"	August 22, 2022	1907	3.31	0.8
211	8	"The Men Tell All"	August 29, 2022	N/A	3.31	0.8
212	9	"Week 8: Fantasy Suites, Part 1"	September 5, 2022	1908	3.26	0.7
213	10	"Week 8: Fantasy Suites, Part 2"	September 6, 2022	1909	3.24	0.7
214	11	"Week 9: Season Finale"	September 13, 2022	1910A	3.55	0.9
215	12	"After the Final Rose"	September 20, 2022	1910B	3.57	0.9

=== Season 20 (2023) ===
No. overall	No. in season	Title	Original release date	Prod. code	U.S. viewers (millions)	Rating (18–49)
216	1	"Week 1: Season Premiere"	June 26, 2023	2001	1.92	0.4
217	2	"Week 2"	July 3, 2023	2002	1.77	0.3
218	3	"Week 3: San Diego"	July 10, 2023	2003	1.93	0.4
219	4	"Week 4: Washington"	July 17, 2023	2004	2.14	0.4
220	5	"Week 5: New Orleans"	July 24, 2023	2005	2.59	0.5
221	6	"Week 6: Hometowns"	July 31, 2023	2006	2.53	0.4
222	7	"Week 7: Fantasy Suites"	August 7, 2023	2007	2.98	0.6
223	8	"The Men Tell All"	August 14, 2023	N/A	2.64	0.4
224	9	"Week 8: Season Finale & After the Final Rose"	August 21, 2023	2008	2.99	0.5

=== Season 21 (2024) ===
No. overall	No. in season	Title	Original release date	Prod. code	U.S. viewers (millions)	Rating (18–49)
225	1	"Week 1: Season Premiere"	July 8, 2024	2101	2.80	0.5
226	2	"Week 2: Melbourne, Australia"	July 15, 2024	2102	2.38	0.4
227	3	"Week 3: Melbourne, Australia"	July 22, 2024	2103	2.43	0.4
228	4	"Week 4: Auckland, New Zealand"	July 29, 2024 (Note: Week 4 and Week 5 were aired during the 2024 Summer Olympics at the same time.)	2104	2.02	0.3
229	5	"Week 5: Auckland, New Zealand"	August 5, 2024	2105	2.26	0.4
230	6	"Week 6: Seattle"	August 12, 2024	2106	2.56	0.4
231	7	"Week 7: Hometowns"	August 19, 2024	2107	2.31	0.3
232	8	"Week 8: Fantasy Suites"	August 26, 2024	2108	2.61	0.4
233	9	"The Men Tell All"	August 27, 2024	N/A	2.38	0.3
234	10	"Week 9: Season Finale & After the Final Rose"	September 3, 2024	2109	2.88	0.5

== Specials ==
No.	Title	Original release date	U.S. viewers (millions)	Rating/share (18–49)
S–1	"Trista & Ryan's Wedding: Part 1"	November 26, 2003	12.10	N/A
S–2	"Trista & Ryan's Wedding: Part 2"	December 3, 2003	13.20	N/A
S–3	"Trista & Ryan's Wedding: Part 3"	December 10, 2003	17.10	N/A
Bachelorette–8	"Ashley and J.P.'s Wedding"	December 16, 2012	3.95	1.0/3
Bachelorette–15	"The Biggest Bachelorette Reunion in Bachelor History Ever!"	May 6, 2019	2.84	0.6/3
Bachelorette–22	"The Bachelorette: Before the First Rose"	March 15, 2026	N/A	TBA

== Notes and references ==
Notes

Specific
