= The Bachelor (American TV series) season 1 =

The Bachelor
- Season 1
- Promotional poster
- Starring: Alex Michel
- Presented by: Chris Harrison
- No. of contestants: 25
- Winner: Amanda Marsh
- Runner-up: Trista Rehn
- No. of episodes: 7 (including 1 special)

Release
- Original network: ABC
- Original release: March 25 – April 25, 2002

Season chronology
- Next → Season 2

The Bachelor was the first season of ABC reality television series The Bachelor. The show featured 31-year-old Alex Michel, a Harvard-educated management consultant from Charlottesville, Virginia. The season premiered on 25 March 2002, and concluded on April 25, 2002, with Michel choosing to pursue a relationship with 23-year-old event planner Amanda Marsh. They broke up several months later.

== Contestants ==
The following is the list of bachelorettes for this season:

Name	Age	Hometown	Job	Eliminated
Amanda Marsh	23	Chanute, Kansas	Event Planner	Winner
Trista Rehn	29	St. Louis, Missouri	Miami Heat Dancer	Runner-up
Shannon Oliver	24	Dallas, Texas	Financial Management Consultant	Week 5
Kimberly Karels	24	Tempe, Arizona	Nanny	Week 4
Cathy Grimes	22	Terre Haute, Indiana	Graduate Student	Week 3
Christina Stencil	28	Bonita, California	Attorney	Week 3
LaNease Adams	23	Playa Del Rey, California	Actress	Week 3
Rhonda Rittenhouse	28	Woodward, Oklahoma	Commercial Real Estate Agent	Week 3
Alexa Jurgielewicz	27	Beverly Hills, California	Special Ed. Teacher	Week 2
Amy Anzel	28	Yonkers, New York	Production Coordinator	Week 2
Angela Lowery	25	Avondale, Arizona	Hooters Waitress	Week 2
Angelique Madrid	27	Burbank, California	Actress	Week 2
Katie Sapienza	23	Malden, Massachusetts	Power Tool Sales Rep.	Week 2
Melissa Reese	25	Tempe, Arizona	Photographer	Week 2
Tina Chen	27	Plano, Texas	Graduate Student	Week 2
Amber Johnson	29	Los Angeles, California	Business Development Director	Week 1
Daniela Ferdico	30	Seattle, Washington	Neuropsychologist	Week 1
Denise Kellaher	30	Honolulu, Hawaii	Doctor	Week 1
Jackie Hucko	22	Pittsburgh, Pennsylvania	Bar Manager	Week 1
Jill Gosser	31	Chicago, Illinois	Retail Manager	Week 1
Kristina Jenkins	27	Chelsea, New York	Advertising Executive	Week 1
Lisa Gold	29	Dallas, Texas	Attorney	Week 1
Paula Oliveira	24	Swansea, Massachusetts	Insurance Representative	Week 1
Rachel Lanzillotto	29	Eastchester, New York	6th Grade Teacher	Week 1
Wendi Plotnik	26	Dallas, Texas	Technology Specialist	Week 1

=== Future appearances ===
Trista Rehn was chosen to be the Bachelorette for the first season of The Bachelorette. Shannon Oliver appeared in episode 3 of the first season of The Bachelorette to give Trista advice.

Amy Anzel appeared in Trista's wedding mini-series and would go on to act in several projects, most notably having a role in Kick Ass 2. She also competed in the British version of The Apprentice in 2022.

== Elimination chart ==
#	Contestants	Week					
#	Contestants	1	2	3	4	5	6
1	Kim	Amanda	Shannon	Amanda	Trista	Trista	Amanda
2	Cathy	Cathy	Amanda	Shannon	Shannon	Amanda	Trista
3	Trista	Trista	Cathy	Kim	Amanda	Shannon	
4	Denise	LaNease	Rhonda	Trista	Kim		
5	Amy	Tina	Christina S.	Cathy; Christina S. LaNease; Rhonda			
6	Alexa	Christina S.	Kim	Cathy; Christina S. LaNease; Rhonda			
7	LaNease	Katie	Trista	Cathy; Christina S. LaNease; Rhonda			
8	Rachel	Alexa	LaNease	Cathy; Christina S. LaNease; Rhonda			
9	Tina	Angelique	Alexa; Amy; Angela; Angelique; Katie; Melissa; Tina				
10	Angelique	Amy	Alexa; Amy; Angela; Angelique; Katie; Melissa; Tina				
11	Wendi	Melissa	Alexa; Amy; Angela; Angelique; Katie; Melissa; Tina				
12	Rhonda	Angela	Alexa; Amy; Angela; Angelique; Katie; Melissa; Tina				
13	Christina S.	Kim	Alexa; Amy; Angela; Angelique; Katie; Melissa; Tina				
14	Jill	Shannon	Alexa; Amy; Angela; Angelique; Katie; Melissa; Tina				
15	Katie	Rhonda	Alexa; Amy; Angela; Angelique; Katie; Melissa; Tina				
16	Amanda	Amber; Daniela; Denise; Jackie; Jill; Kristina J. Lisa; Paula; Rachel; Wendi					
17	Lisa	Amber; Daniela; Denise; Jackie; Jill; Kristina J. Lisa; Paula; Rachel; Wendi					
18	Angela	Amber; Daniela; Denise; Jackie; Jill; Kristina J. Lisa; Paula; Rachel; Wendi					
19	Amber	Amber; Daniela; Denise; Jackie; Jill; Kristina J. Lisa; Paula; Rachel; Wendi					
20	Daniela	Amber; Daniela; Denise; Jackie; Jill; Kristina J. Lisa; Paula; Rachel; Wendi					
21	Paula	Amber; Daniela; Denise; Jackie; Jill; Kristina J. Lisa; Paula; Rachel; Wendi					
22	Jackie	Amber; Daniela; Denise; Jackie; Jill; Kristina J. Lisa; Paula; Rachel; Wendi					
23	Melissa	Amber; Daniela; Denise; Jackie; Jill; Kristina J. Lisa; Paula; Rachel; Wendi					
24	Kristina J.	Amber; Daniela; Denise; Jackie; Jill; Kristina J. Lisa; Paula; Rachel; Wendi					
25	Shannon	Amber; Daniela; Denise; Jackie; Jill; Kristina J. Lisa; Paula; Rachel; Wendi					

The contestant won the competition.
The contestant was eliminated at the rose ceremony.

== Episodes ==
No. overall	No. in season	Title	Original release date	Prod. code	U.S. viewers (millions)	Rating/share (18–49)
1	1	"Week 1"	March 25, 2002	101	9.90	4.0/0
There were no dates during the first week. Amber, Daniela, Denise, Jackie, Jill, Kristina, Lisa, Paula, Rachel, and Wendi were all sent home in the first rose ceremony.
2	2	"Week 2"	April 1, 2002	102	10.20	4.4/11
There were three group dates. Five women were sent on each. Alexa, Amy, Angela, Angelique, Katie, Melissa, and Tina were eliminated at the rose ceremony.
3	3	"Week 3"	April 8, 2002	103	9.40	4.2/10
One-on-one date: Amanda. One-on-one date: Trista. Group date: Cathy, Christina, Kim, LaNease, and Rhonda. One-on-one date: Shannon Cathy, Christina, LaNease, and Rhonda were eliminated at the rose ceremony.
4	4	"Week 4"	April 15, 2002	104	11.10	4.6/12
Hometown Visits: Kim – Tempe, Arizona; Shannon – Dallas, Texas; Trista – Miami, Florida; Amanda – Chanute, Kansas. Kim was eliminated at the rose ceremony.
5	5	"Week 5"	April 22, 2002	105	13.10	5.7/14
Overnight Dates: Amanda (New York), Shannon (Vermont), and Trista (Hawaii). Shannon was eliminated at the rose ceremony.
6	6	"The Women Tell All"	April 25, 2002	N/A	10.80	3.6/9
7	7	"Week 6"	April 25, 2002	106	18.20	7.3/17
Meeting Alex's Parents and Final Dates: Amanda and Trista. Trista's limo pulled up to the altar first, where Alex sent her home in a limo, brokenhearted. Amanda then came to the altar, where Alex declared her his chosen woman and entered into a relationship with her.
