= The Bachelorette (American TV series) season 3 =

The Bachelorette
- Season 3
- Promotional poster
- Starring: Jennifer Schefft
- Presented by: Chris Harrison
- No. of contestants: 25
- Winner: Jerry Ferris
- Runner-up: John Paul Merritt
- No. of episodes: 9 (including 2 specials)

Release
- Original network: ABC
- Original release: January 10 – February 28, 2005

Season chronology
- ← Previous; Season 2 Next → Season 4

The third season of The Bachelorette, an ABC reality television series, premiered on January 10, 2005. This season featured 28-year-old Jennifer Schefft, a publicist from Mentor, Ohio.

Schefft was previously the winner of season 3 of The Bachelor, where she got engaged to Andrew Firestone; however, they ended their engagement in December 2003. For her season, Schefft had the opportunity to assist in casting the 25 bachelors from which she will choose.

The season concluded on February 28, 2005, with Schefft choosing to pursue a relationship with 29-year-old art gallery director Jerry Ferris. However, she rejected his proposal, and it was revealed during the live After The Final Rose special that they were no longer together.

== Bachelorette ==
Jennifer Ann Schefft, born July 23, 1976, is a native of Mentor, Ohio.

In 2007, Schefft wrote A No-Regrets Guide to Loving Yourself and Never Settling - Better Single Than Sorry, published by HarperCollins. On July 10, 2009, Schefft married Joe Waterman in Chicago.

== Contestants ==
Name	Age	Hometown	Occupation	Outcome
Jerry Ferris	29	Los Angeles, California	Art Gallery Director	Winner
John Paul Merritt	25	Oklahoma City, Oklahoma	Entrepreneur	Episode 8
Ryan Sheaffer	28	Manhattan Beach, California	Teacher	Episode 6
Wendell Jisa	32	Chicago, Illinois	Entrepreneur	Episode 5
Fabrice Le Parc	25	New York City, New York	Entrepreneur, Investor	Episode 4
Ben Sands	26	Aspen, Colorado	Ski Instructor	Episode 4
Josh Cox	28	Murrieta, California	Professional Marathoner	Episode 3
Keith Bruno	28	Encinitas, California	Welder	Episode 3
A.W. Webb	27	Newport Beach, California	Mortgage Consultant	Episode 2
Jason Illian	29	Fort Worth, Texas	Motivational Speaker	Episode 2
Mark DeMascole	30	Carlsbad, California	Commercial Finance	Episode 2
Matt Mills	32	Manor Heights, New York	Firefighter	Episode 2
Michael Foster	31	Monroe, Michigan	Teacher	Episode 2
Ryan Smith	34	Germantown, Pennsylvania	Lawyer	Episode 2
Stuart "Stu" Lopoten	27	Willowyck, Pennsylvania	Lawyer	Episode 2
Andrew Maloney	37	New York, New York	Bartender	Episode 1
Andy LeRoy	29	Steamboat Springs, Colorado	Ski Coach	Episode 1
Chris Campbell	27	Campton, Kentucky	Hairdresser	Episode 1
Chris Miller	33	Cleveland, Ohio	Sports Agent	Episode 1
Collin Evans	27	Austin, Texas	Sports Agent	Episode 1
David Vargas	30	Chicago, Illinois	Marketing Consultant	Episode 1
Eric Hagerman	35	New York, New York	Magazine Editor	Episode 1
Eric Topacio	37	San Diego, California	Firefighter	Episode 1
Kevin	26	New York, New York	Consultant	Episode 1
Matt Lipson	33	Manhattan Beach, California	Lawyer	Episode 1

== Call-out order ==
Order	Bachelors	Week						
Order	Bachelors	1	2	3	4	5	6	8
1	Ryan Sh.	Keith	Wendell	John Paul	Ryan Sh.	John Paul	John Paul	Jerry
2	Eric T.	Ryan Sh.	Fabrice	Jerry	Jerry	Jerry	Jerry	John Paul
3	Chris C.	A.W.	Ben	Ryan Sh.	Wendell	Ryan Sh.	Ryan Sh.	
4	Jason	Matt M.	Keith	Ben	John Paul	Wendell		
5	Ryan Sm.	Wendell	Ryan Sh.	Wendell	Ben			
6	John Paul	Ryan Sm.	Jerry	Fabrice	Fabrice			
7	Stu	Mark	John Paul	Josh; Keith				
8	Matt M.	Ben	Josh	Josh; Keith				
9	Keith	John Paul	A.W. Jason; Mark; Matt M. Michael; Ryan Sm. Stu					
10	Andy	Jerry	A.W. Jason; Mark; Matt M. Michael; Ryan Sm. Stu					
11	Michael	Jason	A.W. Jason; Mark; Matt M. Michael; Ryan Sm. Stu					
12	Kevin	Josh	A.W. Jason; Mark; Matt M. Michael; Ryan Sm. Stu					
13	David	Fabrice	A.W. Jason; Mark; Matt M. Michael; Ryan Sm. Stu					
14	Chris M.	Michael	A.W. Jason; Mark; Matt M. Michael; Ryan Sm. Stu					
15	Fabrice	Stu	A.W. Jason; Mark; Matt M. Michael; Ryan Sm. Stu					
16	Mark	Andrew; Andy; Chris C. Chris M. Collin; David; Eric H. Eric T. Kevin; Matt L.						
17	Josh	Andrew; Andy; Chris C. Chris M. Collin; David; Eric H. Eric T. Kevin; Matt L.						
18	Eric H.	Andrew; Andy; Chris C. Chris M. Collin; David; Eric H. Eric T. Kevin; Matt L.						
19	Wendell	Andrew; Andy; Chris C. Chris M. Collin; David; Eric H. Eric T. Kevin; Matt L.						
20	Andrew	Andrew; Andy; Chris C. Chris M. Collin; David; Eric H. Eric T. Kevin; Matt L.						
21	Ben	Andrew; Andy; Chris C. Chris M. Collin; David; Eric H. Eric T. Kevin; Matt L.						
22	Collin	Andrew; Andy; Chris C. Chris M. Collin; David; Eric H. Eric T. Kevin; Matt L.						
23	A.W.	Andrew; Andy; Chris C. Chris M. Collin; David; Eric H. Eric T. Kevin; Matt L.						
24	Matt L.	Andrew; Andy; Chris C. Chris M. Collin; David; Eric H. Eric T. Kevin; Matt L.						
25	Jerry	Andrew; Andy; Chris C. Chris M. Collin; David; Eric H. Eric T. Kevin; Matt L.						

The contestant received the first impression rose
The contestant was eliminated at the rose ceremony
The contestant quit the competition
The contestant won the competition

== Episodes ==
No. overall	No. in season	Title	Original release date	Prod. code	U.S. viewers (millions)	Rating/share (18–49)
17	1	"Week 1"	January 10, 2005	301	9.12	4.3/10
18	2	"Week 2"	January 17, 2005	302	8.33	3.7/8
19	3	"Week 3"	January 24, 2005	303	8.02	3.6/8
20	4	"Week 4"	January 31, 2005	304	8.98	4.0/9
21	5	"Week 5"	February 7, 2005	305	9.38	4.2/9
22	6	"Week 6"	February 14, 2005	306	8.21	3.5/8
23	7	"The Men Tell All"	February 21, 2005	N/A	8.96	4.0/9
24	8	"Week 7"	February 28, 2005	307	8.37	3.4/8
25	9	"After the Final Rose"	February 28, 2005	N/A	11.33	5.0/12
