= Trista Sutter =

American television personality

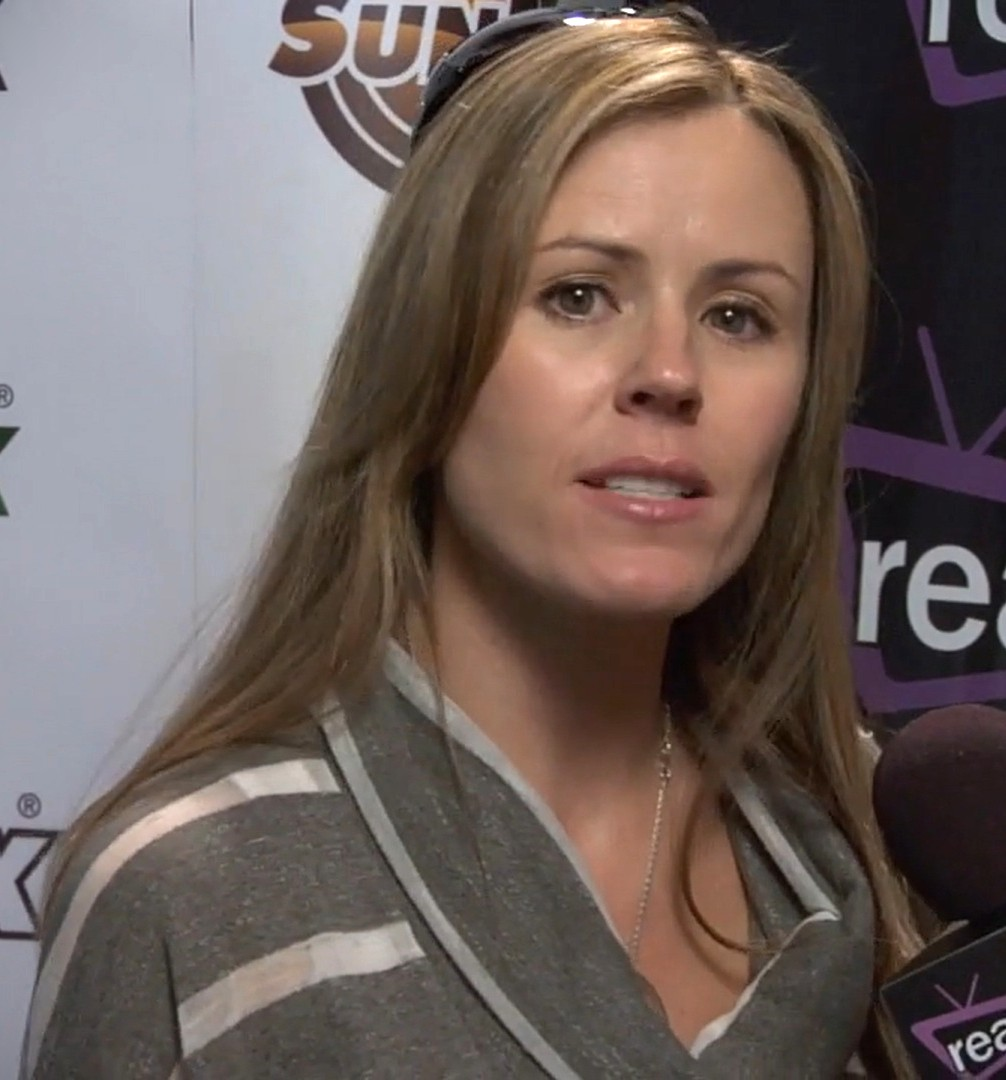
- Sutter in 2011
- Born: Trista Nicole Rehn; October 28, 1972 (age 53); Indianapolis, Indiana, U.S.
- Occupation: Television personality
- Spouse: Ryan Sutter (m. 2003)
- Children: 2

Trista Nicole Sutter (née Rehn, born October 28, 1972) is an American television personality who was the runner-up on season 1 of The Bachelor before becoming the star of the first season of its companion show, The Bachelorette. Sutter has also appeared on Dancing with the Stars and Fear Factor.

== Early life ==
Sutter was born in Indianapolis, Indiana, and raised in St. Louis, Missouri. Attending Indiana University Bloomington, she earned a bachelor's degree in exercise science. She attended the University of Miami for her master's degree in physical therapy, and continued living in Miami, Florida, for five years, working in pediatric physical therapy at Miami Children’s Hospital while spending two NBA seasons as a dancer for the basketball team the Miami Heat.

== The Bachelor ==
Rehn appeared as a contestant on season 1 of ABC's The Bachelor. She finished runner-up after bachelor Alex Michel selected Amanda Marsh as the winner ahead of Rehn in the show's finale.

== The Bachelorette ==
After her appearance on The Bachelor, Rehn was selected to be featured in the gender-reversed spin-off, The Bachelorette. She chose Ryan Sutter as the winner, and the couple were married on December 6, 2003. They were paid US$1 million by ABC for affording the network the right to televise their wedding ceremony, which was broadcast as the finale of a three-episode special called Trista & Ryan's Wedding. The miniseries, filmed at "The Lodge" luxury resort in Rancho Mirage, California, drew over 26 million viewers.

== Television appearances ==
Under her maiden name, Rehn was a Miami Heat Dancer in the early 2000s. Rehn appeared opposite actor Jason Alexander in a KFC commercial. In 2002, she appeared as herself in an episode of According to Jim. She also has appeared in country music singer Brad Paisley's music video "Celebrity" in 2003 with Alexander, Little Jimmy Dickens, and William Shatner. In 2005 she made a guest appearance on an episode of NBC's Fear Factor, cheering on Ryan Sutter, who was a contestant.

Sutter was a contestant on season one of the American version of Dancing with the Stars. On June 10, 2011, the Sutters appeared in a Hands Only CPR PSA campaign from the American Heart Association and the Ad Council. In 2014, the Sutters appeared on the program Marriage Boot Camp: Reality Stars. In 2015, the Sutters were contestants in Bachelor Fan Favorites Week on Who Wants to Be a Millionaire. The Sutters also appeared in 2015 on a pilot for Rocky Mountain Reno, a home renovation show; the pilot aired on HGTV. In 2025, she appeared as a recruit on Season 3 of Special Forces: World's Toughest Test.

== Personal life ==
As of June 2020, Sutter resides in Eagle County, Colorado. Ryan is a firefighter in Vail, Colorado.

Trista attended Indiana University, where she belonged to the Alpha Mu chapter of Alpha Chi Omega.

In February 2007, the Sutters told People magazine that they were expecting their first child in the summer of 2007. During her seventh month of pregnancy, Trista was diagnosed with gestational diabetes that escalated into HELLP syndrome. In July 2007, Maxwell Alston was born four weeks early stemming from pregnancy complications via c-section after a failed induction/stalled labor. Maxwell was first revealed to the public on the cover of Us Weekly magazine and made his first on-camera appearance in a video diary series Trista recorded for Momlogic.com.

Trista was ranked #7 on the Maxim Hot 100 Women of 2003.

On October 14, 2008, Trista and Ryan announced to Life and Style magazine that she was pregnant with their second child. Trista said that if the baby were another boy, they might adopt a girl. On April 3, 2009, Trista delivered daughter Blakesley Grace via C-section after battling through a brutal snowstorm in Denver that weekend. In April 2009, she also confirmed that she plans to undergo the Essure permanent birth control procedure.
