= The Bachelorette (American TV series) =

US television series

- Genre: Dating game show
- Presented by: Chris Harrison; Tayshia Adams; Kaitlyn Bristowe; Jesse Palmer
- Country of origin: United States
- Original language: English
- No. of seasons: 21 (1 unaired)
- No. of episodes: 234 (list of episodes)

Production
- Executive producer: Elan Gale
- Running time: 40–125 minutes
- Production companies: AND Syndicated Productions; NZK Productions; Next Entertainment (seasons 1–20); Telepictures Productions (seasons 1–3); Warner Horizon Unscripted Television (Note: Known as Warner Horizon Television until 2020) (season 4–present)

Original release
- Network: ABC
- Release: January 8, 2003 – present

Related
- The Bachelor; Bachelor Pad; Bachelor in Paradise; Bachelor in Paradise: After Paradise; The Bachelor Winter Games; The Bachelor Presents: Listen to Your Heart; The Golden Bachelor; The Golden Bachelorette

The Bachelorette is an American reality television dating game show that debuted on ABC on January 8, 2003. The show is a spin-off of The Bachelor and the staple part of The Bachelor franchise. The first season featured Trista Rehn, the runner-up from the first season of The Bachelor, offering the opportunity for Rehn to choose a husband among 25 bachelors. The 2004 season of The Bachelorette again took a runner-up from the previous season of The Bachelor. After last airing on February 28, 2005, the series returned to ABC during the spring of 2008, following an absence of three years, and has since become an annual staple of the network's summer programming.

For its first 16 seasons, the show was hosted by Chris Harrison. JoJo Fletcher took on temporary hosting duties during season 16 when Harrison was isolating having taken his son to college.

In March 2021, the show announced it would air two seasons for the first time ever. The seventeenth season debuted on June 7, 2021, with former Bachelorettes Tayshia Adams and Kaitlyn Bristowe as hosts. The eighteenth season premiered on October 19, 2021, with Adams and Bristowe returning as co-hosts. (Note: Although Adams and Bristowe were the interim hosts for seasons 17 and 18, they were credited as 'Special Guest' at the end of those seasons' episodes.)

In March 2022, it was announced that there would be two Bachelorettes in one season. The 19th season premiered on July 11, 2022, with Jesse Palmer as host. Although season 11 featured two Bachelorettes in the first episode, and season 16 featured two consecutive Bachelorettes within a season, this marked the first time that two women led concurrently for the entire season.

On February 10, 2024, ABC renewed the series for a twenty-first season, which premiered on July 8, 2024. On February 7, 2025, it was announced that the show was on hiatus for the summer 2025 television season.

In September 2025, ABC had renewed the series for a twenty-second season which was originally slated to premiere on March 22, 2026. However, three days prior to the season premiere, ABC announced that the season would not air due to Bachelorette Taylor Frankie Paul's ongoing domestic assault investigation relating to a domestic violence incident that occurred in 2023.

== Plot ==
All of the rules are adapted from the rules of its parent show, The Bachelor. As the name implies, it is essentially a gender-swapped version of The Bachelor: the series revolves around a single bachelorette, usually a former contestant from a recent Bachelor season, and a pool of romantic interests (typically 25, though sometimes more) which could include a potential husband for the bachelorette. The show starts with the bachelorette standing in front of the mansion and greeting each male contestant individually, as they make an entrance to the bachelorette. After each rose ceremony, at least one contestant does not receive a rose and goes home; therefore, the pool of contenders gets smaller, and eventually leaves the bachelorette to decide between two contestants in the final rose ceremony.

For the final selection, one of two male suitors proposes to the bachelorette. Unlike its parent show, the first sixteen seasons of The Bachelorette have ended with a proposal which the bachelorette either accepted or declined. The series has resulted in five marriages to date: Trista Rehn's to Ryan Sutter, Ashley Hebert's to JP Rosenbaum, Desiree Hartsock's to Chris Siegfried, Rachel Lindsay's to Bryan Abasolo, and JoJo Fletcher's to Jordan Rodgers. The first two weddings were broadcast on ABC. Season 16 was the only season that did not hold an After the Final Rose special due to circumstances over the COVID-19 pandemic and Christmas holiday.

=== Casting ===
Season 11 was the first season to feature a twist in casting. Since producers could not unanimously decide between The Bachelor Season 19 contenders Kaitlyn Bristowe and Britt Nilsson, the 25 men participating had to decide which Bachelorette would make the best wife. In the end, more men voted for Kaitlyn, and Britt was sent home on the first night.

Season 13 was the first season to have an African-American contestant, Rachel Lindsay, as the lead in the entire Bachelor franchise. Season 16 was the first season to feature two bachelorettes. Clare Crawley was initially cast, but left the show after becoming engaged to contestant Dale Moss. Tayshia Adams was then brought in to complete the season.

In March 2021, after host Chris Harrison announced he was "stepping away" from the franchise, former Bachelorettes Tayshia Adams and Kaitlyn Bristowe were announced as co-hosts for season 17. In June 2021, a day after the season 17 premiere, Harrison announced he was leaving the franchise altogether.

Season 19 was the third season to feature two Bachelorettes, Gabby Windey and Rachel Recchia and it was the first season to feature both leads for the entire season.

Season 21 was the first season to have an Asian-American contestant, Jenn Tran, as the lead in the entire Bachelor franchise history.

Season 22 would have had to feature Taylor Frankie Paul, a cast member from The Secret Lives of Mormon Wives, as the first lead to have never previously appeared in the Bachelor franchise before. However, the season would not air due to a domestic assault investigation relating to a domestic violence incident that occurred in 2023.

== Questions of authenticity ==
Family Guy parodied the show's authenticity in the episode "Brian the Bachelor" on June 26, 2005.

The Bachelorette season 4 winner, Jesse Csincsak, commented that contestants must follow producers' orders and that a storyline was fabricated in the editing room.

On March 15, 2010, The Bachelorette creator Mike Fleiss appeared on 20/20 to confess that he developed the show's contestants into characters that catered to his audience's tastes, and that they "need [their] fair share of villains every season". Fleiss has come under fire for admitting that The Bachelor has less to do with reality than it does making good television.

By season 7 of The Bachelorette, some believed that actors were being hired by ABC to play specific roles on the show. Some viewers were becoming tired of the show's scripted nature and speaking out.

In 2018, Amy Kaufman published a book titled, Bachelor Nation: Inside the World of America's Favorite Guilty Pleasure. This book provided insight on some of the manipulation tactics that producers employ in order to create drama and garner controversy as a ratings ploy.

== Setting ==
Much like the parent show, the first two seasons were filmed in a luxurious house in Los Angeles County, California, and "Villa De La Vina" in Agoura Hills, California, for later seasons. Since the fifth season, the third and remaining episodes filmed around the world. Episodes have been filmed throughout the United States, Canada, Spain, Iceland, Turkey, Portugal, Thailand, China (Hong Kong only), Bermuda, England, Croatia, Czech Republic, Germany, France, Italy, Belgium and Ireland. In season 3, filming was located in New York City; Charlotte, North Carolina, for season 8, where Emily Maynard lived, so that she could stay with her daughter Ricki during production. In addition to Villa De La Vina mansion, the contestants in seasons 4 and 5 lived in a bunkhouse close to the mansion.

Due to the concerns surrounding the COVID-19 pandemic, when the mansion was strictly restricted for filming purposes, the sixteenth and seventeenth seasons filmed entirely within the United States being isolated on a quarantine type bio-secure bubble atmosphere around a single location at the hotel or resort they rented by production. While the eighteenth season filmed mostly in the United States, some quarantine restrictions being lifted with limited travel. In the twenty-first season, the mansion was not used for filming purposes unrelated to the then-existing pandemic above, they used the Hummingbird Nest Ranch in Santa Susana, California previously appeared in the spin-off series The Bachelor Presents: Listen to Your Heart.

== Seasons ==
Season	Original run	Bachelorette	Winner	Runner-up	Proposal	Still together?	Relationship status
1	January 8 – February 19, 2003	Trista Rehn	Ryan Sutter	Charlie Maher	Yes	Yes	Rehn and Sutter were married on December 6, 2003, on national television. They live in Denver with their two children.
2	January 14 – February 26, 2004	Meredith Phillips	Ian Mckee	Matthew Hickl	Yes	No	Phillips and Mckee got engaged at the end of the show, but broke up in February 2005.
3	January 10 – February 28, 2005	Jen Schefft	Jerry Ferris	John Paul Merritt	No (Note: Ferris proposed to Schefft, but she said no.)	No	During the final rose ceremony, Schefft chose Ferris over Merritt. Ferris proposed to Schefft, but she told him to hold onto the ring, but she later revealed during the live After the Final Rose special that she rejected his proposal.
4	May 19 – July 7, 2008	DeAnna Pappas	Jesse Csincsak	Jason Mesnick	Yes	No	Pappas and Csincsak got engaged in the finale, and their wedding was set for May 9, 2009, but they broke up in November 2008.
5	May 18 – July 28, 2009	Jillian Harris	Ed Swiderski	Kiptyn Locke	Yes	No	Harris and Swiderski got engaged in the finale, but they broke up in July 2010.
6	May 24 – August 2, 2010	Ali Fedotowsky	Roberto Martinez	Chris Lambton	Yes	No	Fedotowsky and Martinez got engaged in the finale, but they broke up in November 2011.
7	May 23 – August 1, 2011	Ashley Hebert	JP Rosenbaum	Ben Flajnik	Yes	No	Hebert and Rosenbaum married on December 1, 2012, and their wedding aired as a TV special on December 16 of that year. They have two children together. On October 14, 2020, they announced that they had decided to permanently separate. Their divorce was finalized on October 7, 2021.
8	May 14 – July 23, 2012	Emily Maynard	Jef Holm	Arie Luyendyk Jr.	Yes	No	Maynard and Holm got engaged in the finale, but they broke up in October 2012.
9	May 27 – August 5, 2013	Desiree Hartsock	Chris Siegfried	Drew Kenney	Yes	Yes	Hartsock and Siegfried married on January 18, 2015, and currently live in Portland, Oregon, with their three sons.
10	May 19 – July 28, 2014	Andi Dorfman	Josh Murray	Nick Viall	Yes	No	Murray proposed to Dorfman in the season finale, but they announced their breakup on January 8, 2015.
11 (Note: Season 11 featured two Bachelorettes at the start. Kaitlyn Bristowe and Britt Nilsson were initially selected as candidates. In the second episode, the men voted Bristowe as the Bachelorette for the majority of the season.)	May 18 – July 27, 2015	Kaitlyn Bristowe	Shawn Booth	Nick Viall	Yes	No	Booth proposed to Bristowe in the season finale, but they announced their breakup on November 2, 2018. On May 12, 2021, Bristowe announced her engagement to Jason Tartick, who finished in third place on season 14. On August 6, 2023, Bristowe and Tartick announced their breakup.
12	May 23 – August 1, 2016	Joelle "JoJo" Fletcher	Jordan Rodgers	Robby Hayes	Yes	Yes	Fletcher and Rodgers married on May 14, 2022, in Santa Ynez, California, after previously postponing their wedding twice due to the COVID-19 pandemic. They currently live in Puerto Rico with their daughter.
13	May 22 – August 7, 2017	Rachel Lindsay	Bryan Abasolo	Peter Kraus	Yes	No	Lindsay and Abasolo married on August 24, 2019. Abasolo filed for divorce on January 2, 2024. Their divorce was finalized on January 8, 2025.
14	May 28 – August 6, 2018	Becca Kufrin	Garrett Yrigoyen	Blake Horstmann	Yes	No	Yrigoyen proposed to Kufrin in the season finale, but they broke up in August 2020. On October 13, 2023, Kufrin married season 17 contestant Thomas Jacobs, whom she met on season 7 of Bachelor in Paradise. Kufrin and Jacobs have a son together.
15	May 13 – July 30, 2019	Hannah Brown	Jed Wyatt	Tyler Cameron	Yes	No	In the live season finale, it was revealed that Brown and Wyatt broke up in June 2019 after Brown discovered that Wyatt had a girlfriend at the time of filming. Wyatt also admitted that he went on the show to promote his music career. During the After the Final Rose special, Brown asked runner-up Cameron on a date, but they ultimately decided not to pursue a relationship.
16 (Note: Season 16 featured two Bachelorettes. After the first Bachelorette Clare Crawley prematurely chose Dale Moss, new Bachelorette Tayshia Adams was introduced and continued the season with the remaining men, and 4 additional men were added to the cast.)	October 13 – December 22, 2020	Clare Crawley	Dale Moss	—N/a	Yes	No	Moss proposed to Crawley in the fourth episode. They announced their breakup on January 19, 2021. On May 28, 2021, Moss confirmed they were back together, but they broke up for good in September 2021.
16	October 13 – December 22, 2020	Tayshia Adams	Zac Clark	Ben Smith	Yes	No	Clark proposed to Adams in the season finale, but they announced their breakup on November 22, 2021.
17	June 7 – August 9, 2021	Katie Thurston	Blake Moynes	Justin Glaze	Yes	No	Moynes proposed to Thurston in the season finale, but they announced their breakup on October 25, 2021. On November 23, 2021, Thurston announced that she was dating John Hersey, whom she had previously eliminated during week two of her season. She confirmed their breakup on June 20, 2022.
18	October 19 – December 21, 2021	Michelle Young	Nayte Olukoya	Brandon Jones	Yes	No	Olukoya proposed to Young in the season finale, but they announced their breakup on June 17, 2022.
19 (Note: Season 19 featured two Bachelorettes for the entire season.)	July 11 – September 20, 2022	Gabby Windey	Erich Schwer	Jason Alabaster	Yes	No	Schwer proposed to Windey in the season finale. They announced their breakup on November 4, 2022. On August 2, 2023, Windey came out on The View and announced her relationship with female comedian Robby Hoffman.
19	July 11 – September 20, 2022	Rachel Recchia	Tino Franco	Aven Jones	Yes	No	Although the season ended with Franco proposing to Recchia, it was revealed during the live finale that Recchia had ended their engagement in August 2022 after Franco admitted to cheating on her. Later in the live finale, runner-up Jones asked Recchia on a date, and she said yes. However, they ultimately decided not to pursue a relationship.
20	June 26 – August 21, 2023	Charity Lawson	Dotun Olubeko	Joey Graziadei	Yes	Yes	Lawson and Olubeko are still engaged as of June 2026. Their wedding is set for 2026.
21	July 8 – September 3, 2024	Jenn Tran	Devin Strader	Marcus Shoberg	Yes	No	Although the season ended with Tran and Strader proposing to each other, it was revealed during the live finale that Strader had ended their engagement in August 2024.
22	Unaired (Note: Season 22 was originally scheduled to premiere on March 22, 2026, but it was canceled three days before its airing and remains unaired.)	Taylor Frankie Paul	—N/a				

== Reunion ==
On April 10, 2019, it was announced that a two-hour special titled Bachelorette Reunion: The Biggest Bachelorette Reunion in Bachelor History Ever! would premiere on May 6, 2019. Bachelorettes from seasons 2 and 3, Meredith Phillips and Jen Schefft didn't make an appearance during the reunion special. Although host Chris Harrison claimed Meredith Phillips was unavailable to attend, Reality Steve reported her sending him the text "No, I was never contacted or spoke to anyone. I didn't even know the show was happening." in regards to the reunion. Schefft couldn't make it due to a long-planned family vacation.

== Ratings ==
Viewership and ratings per season of The Bachelorette
Season	Timeslot (ET)	Episodes	First aired		Last aired		TV season	Avg. viewers (millions)	Avg. 18–49 rating
Season	Timeslot (ET)	Episodes	Date	Viewers (millions)	Date	Viewers (millions)	TV season	Avg. viewers (millions)	Avg. 18–49 rating
1	Wednesday 9:00 pm	7	January 8, 2003	17.44	February 19, 2003	20.39	2002–03	16.80	7.9
2	Wednesday 9:00 pm	9	January 14, 2004	TBD	February 26, 2004	7.17 (Note: The After the Final Rose special aired the next day.)	2003–04	11.56	5.2
3	Monday 9:00 pm	9	January 10, 2005	9.12	February 28, 2005	11.33	2004–05	8.93	4.0
4	Monday 8:00 pm (Note: In the fourth season, three episodes aired at the later time of 9:00 pm on May 19, May 26 and June 16.)	11	May 19, 2008	8.08	July 8, 2008	9.90	2007–08	7.31	2.5
5	Monday 9:00 pm	12	May 18, 2009	8.69	July 28, 2009	7.99	2008–09	7.61	2.6
6	Monday 9:00 pm	12	May 24, 2010	9.08	August 2, 2010	11.32	2009–10	9.23	3.0
7	Monday 9:00 pm	12	May 23, 2011	9.02	August 1, 2011	9.31	2010–11	8.05	2.4
8	Monday 8:00 pm (Note: The eighth season premiere aired for 90 minutes at the later time of 9:30 pm. One episode aired at the later time of 9:00 pm on May 21.) (Note: The tenth season premiere aired for 90 minutes at the later time of 9:30 pm.) (Note: In the eleventh season there was a two-night premiere. The first night of the premiere aired at the later time of 9:00 pm. The second night of the premiere aired for 60 minutes at 8:00 pm the next day. One episode aired at the later time of 9:00 pm on May 25.)	12	May 14, 2012	8.05	July 23, 2012	8.80	2011–12	7.44	2.4
9	Monday 8:00 pm	12	May 27, 2013	5.99	August 5, 2013	8.31	2012–13	6.68	2.0
10	Monday 8:00 pm	13	May 19, 2014	7.17	July 28, 2014	8.15	2013–14	6.76	1.7
11	Monday 8:00 pm	13	May 18, 2015	7.10	July 27, 2015	7.94	2014–15	6.86	2.0
12	Monday 8:00 pm	12	May 23, 2016	6.63	August 1, 2016	8.10	2015–16	6.83	2.0
13	Monday 8:00 pm	11	May 22, 2017	5.66	August 7, 2017	7.57	2016–17	5.89	1.6
14	Monday 8:00 pm	11	May 28, 2018	5.50	August 6, 2018	6.71	2017–18	5.79	1.5
15	Monday 8:00 pm	13	May 13, 2019	4.78	July 30, 2019	7.48	2018–19	5.77	1.5
16	Tuesday 8:00 pm	13	October 13, 2020	5.03	December 22, 2020	5.52	2020–21	4.73	1.8
17	Monday 8:00 pm	10	June 7, 2021	3.77	August 9, 2021	4.60	2020–21	3.66	TBD
18	Tuesday 8:00 pm	11	October 19, 2021	3.00	December 21, 2021	3.50	2021–22	TBD	TBD
19	Monday 8:00 pm	12	July 11, 2022	2.98	September 20, 2022	3.57	2021–22	TBD	TBD
20	Monday 9:00 pm (1–4); Monday 8:00 pm (5–9)	9	June 26, 2023	1.92	August 21, 2023	2.98	2022–23	TBD	TBD
21	Monday 8:00 pm (1–8); Tuesday 8:00 pm (9, 10)	10	July 8, 2024	2.80	September 3, 2024	2.88	2023–24	TBD	TBD

== See also ==
- A Shot at Love with Tila Tequila (2007)
- I Love New York (2007)
- Transamerican Love Story (2008)
