= Ryan Sutter =

American football player & television personality (born 1974)

- Born: September 14, 1974 (age 52); Fort Collins, Colorado, U.S.
- Spouse: Trista Rehn (m. 2003)
- Children: 2

Ryan Allen Sutter (born September 14, 1974) is an American television personality and former professional football player. He is the winner on the first season of the dating competition reality TV show The Bachelorette, chosen by inaugural star Trista Rehn. Sutter, a Colorado firefighter, and Rehn were married in a televised wedding on ABC in December 2003.

Prior to his time on the show, Sutter was a college football defensive back with the Colorado Buffaloes football team, and played briefly for the National Football League (NFL).

== Career ==
Born in Fort Collins, Colorado, Sutter is a firefighter in that state.

=== Sports ===
Ryan Sutter
No. 35
- Position: Safety

Personal information
- Listed height: 6 ft 1 in (1.85 m)
- Listed weight: 203 lb (92 kg)

Career information
- College: Colorado
- NFL draft: 1998: 5th round, 133rd overall pick

Career history
- Baltimore Ravens (1998)*; Carolina Panthers (1998); Seattle Seahawks (1999)*; Barcelona Dragons (2000)
- * Offseason or practice squad member only

Awards and highlights
- First-team All-Big 12 (1997)
- Stats at Pro Football Reference

==== Football career ====
Sutter was a defensive back in college with the Colorado Buffaloes football team. He was drafted by the Baltimore Ravens in the fifth round of the 1998 NFL draft. He was cut late in the 1998 training camp. He then signed with the Carolina Panthers a few days later, not making the active roster until November 28, 1998 (he had been on the Panthers practice squad). In the first play of his first game in the NFL, he injured his shoulder while making a tackle against the New York Jets. He was immediately placed on injured reserve and eventually released. The following summer, he signed with the Seattle Seahawks, but was cut. In 2000, Sutter played one season for the Barcelona Dragons of NFL Europe. In the spring of 2005, Ryan was invited to a tryout with the New Orleans Saints, but suffered a knee injury during the minicamp. He has not been in the NFL since.

His "5 seconds" of game time (1 play) is generally recognized as the shortest NFL career ever.

==== Other ====
Ryan Sutter was a competitor on season 9 of American Ninja Warrior. In the Denver Qualifiers, he failed on the third obstacle, the Bouncing Spider, and did not qualify for the Denver Finals.

== Personal life ==
As of 2020, the Sutters live in Avon, Colorado. Ryan Sutter worked for several years as a Vail, Colorado firefighter, and in February 2020 joined the Denver Fire Department. The Sutters had son Maxwell Alston on July 26, 2007, and a daughter, Blakesley Grace on April 3, 2009.

On June 10, 2011, Ryan and Trista Sutter appeared in a Hands Only CPR public service announcement for the American Heart Association and the Ad Council.
