= Madison Prewett =

American television personality (born 1996)

Madison Troutt
- Born: Madison Rose Prewett; March 25, 1996 (age 30)
- Education: Auburn University (BS)
- Occupation: Television personality
- Television: The Bachelor
- Spouse: Grant Troutt (m. 2022)
- Children: 1

Madison Rose Troutt (née Prewett; born March 25, 1996) is an American television personality who came to national prominence in 2020, as the runner-up of season 24 of The Bachelor, starring Peter Weber.

== Early life and education ==
Troutt was born on March 25, 1996 to parents Tonya and Chad Prewett. She has two sisters, Mallory and Mary. Her father is the Director of Operations for the Auburn University men's basketball team. She attended Lee-Scott Academy in Auburn, Alabama. She graduated from Auburn University in 2018 with a bachelor of science degree in mass communications and media studies.

== Career ==
In 2014, she participated in Miss Alabama Teen USA.

Before appearing on The Bachelor, she competed on The Price Is Right in 2019, winning $8,000.

In 2019, she was cast in season 24 of The Bachelor, starring pilot Peter Weber. Filming took place in the fall of 2019. She was officially announced as a contestant on December 16, 2019. In the episode that aired on March 9, 2020, she quit the competition after becoming frustrated with Weber. On After the Final Rose, which aired on March 10, 2020, it is revealed Weber called off his engagement with winner, Hannah Ann Sluss, because he was still in love with Troutt. Troutt and Weber got back together on the show, but they broke up just three days later on March 13, 2020.

She released her book Made For This Moment on October 19, 2021.

On March 25, 2024, Troutt announced the launch of her Stay True Podcast on Instagram.

== Personal life ==
Troutt is a Christian. She got engaged to pastor Grant Troutt, son of Excel Communications founder Kenny Troutt, on July 31, 2022. They were married on October 29, 2022. In August 2024, it was announced that Troutt was expecting their first child, a daughter. In January 20, 2025, Troutt and her husband Grant Troutt welcomed their first child.

== Filmography ==
Year	Title	Title	Notes
2019	The Price Is Right	Herself	Contestant
2020	The Bachelor	Herself	Runner-up; season 24
2020	The Bachelor: The Greatest Seasons - Ever!	Herself	Episode; Kaitlyn Bristowe

== Awards and nominations ==
Year	Award	Category	Nominated work	Result	Ref.
2020	People's Choice Awards	The Competition Contestant of 2020	The Bachelor	Nominated	

Awards and achievements
Preceded by Lauren Burnham	The Bachelor runner up Season 24	Succeeded by Michelle Young
