= The Savant =

Upcoming American miniseries

- Promotional poster
- Genre: Crime thriller
- Created by: Melissa James Gibson
- Inspired by: "Is It Possible to Stop a Mass Shooting Before It Happens?" by Andrea Stanley
- Showrunner: Melissa James Gibson
- Starring: Jessica Chastain; Nnamdi Asomugha
- Country of origin: United States
- Original language: English

Production
- Executive producers: Jessica Chastain; Melissa James Gibson; Alan Poul; Jessica Giles; Kelly Carmichael; Matthew Heineman; David Levine; Garrett Kemble
- Producer: Brian Madden
- Cinematography: Janusz Kamiński
- Production companies: Freckle Films; Fifth Season; Anonymous Content; Apple Studios

Original release
- Network: Apple TV

The Savant is an upcoming American crime thriller television miniseries created by Melissa James Gibson that is based on an article by Andrea Stanley. It stars Jessica Chastain and Nnamdi Asomugha. It is scheduled to premiere in spring 2027.

== Premise ==
The series is inspired by a 2019 Cosmopolitan article, "Is It Possible to Stop a Mass Shooting Before It Happens?".

Chastain will portray "the Savant", who infiltrates online hate groups in order to prevent large-scale public attacks. It covers the division of the Anti-Defamation League that infiltrates online hate groups.

== Cast ==
=== Main ===
- Jessica Chastain as Jodi Goodwin / The Savant
- Nnamdi Asomugha as Charlie Goodwin

=== Recurring ===
- James Badge Dale as Keith Messier
- Cole Doman as Steve Dunicki
- Michael Mosley as Phil Condon
- Dagmara Domińczyk as Danielle Horowitz
- Jordana Spiro as Amber
- Trinity Lee Shirley as Maeve Goodwin
- Toussaint Francois Battiste as Ryan Goodwin
- Hannah Gross as Jenna
- David Wilson Barnes as Ken Larson
- Keeley Karsten as Reg

=== Guest ===
- Pablo Schreiber as Jason

== Production ==
=== Development ===
The series is created by Melissa James Gibson, who also acts as showrunner and executive producer. Matthew Heineman is a director and produced by Fifth Season and Anonymous Content. Kelly Carmichael of Freckle Films also executive produces alongside Jessica Chastain. Jessica Giles, editor-in-chief of Cosmopolitan Magazine and Brian Madden, senior VP of development for Hearst Magazines, will produce. Andrea Stanley, writer of the original Cosmopolitan magazine feature, will consult.

=== Casting ===
It was reported in Variety in March 2023, that Jessica Chastain had been cast in an eight-part series called The Savant for Apple TV. Chastain said that her performance in the role was designed to protect the anonymity of the real-life character because "I wouldn't want to look and behave exactly like her, because I want to keep her hidden." In February 2024, Nnamdi Asomugha joined the cast in a main role, while James Badge Dale was added in a recurring capacity. Additional casting was announced in March. In July 2025, Pablo Schreiber was announced as a guest star of the series.

=== Filming ===
Filming was scheduled for September 2023 in New York. It instead began in April 2024.

== Release ==
Apple TV originally scheduled to release the first two episodes of The Savant on September 26, 2025, with the rest releasing on a weekly basis through November 7, 2025. Three days before the original premiere date, the release date was postponed without a new date or an explanation. Though an explanation was not given, it was believed to be linked to the wake of the assassination of Charlie Kirk, which had occurred two weeks earlier. The delay was criticized by Variety, which called it a "huge mistake" and stated it was "precisely the type of show America needs right now." Chastain distanced herself from the decision, saying she was "not aligned on the decision to pause the release."

On April 20, 2026, it was reported that the series would be released in July 2026. On September 20, 2026, it was reported that the release of the series was postponed again to sometime during the spring of 2027.
