= Jake Funk =

American football player (born 1998)

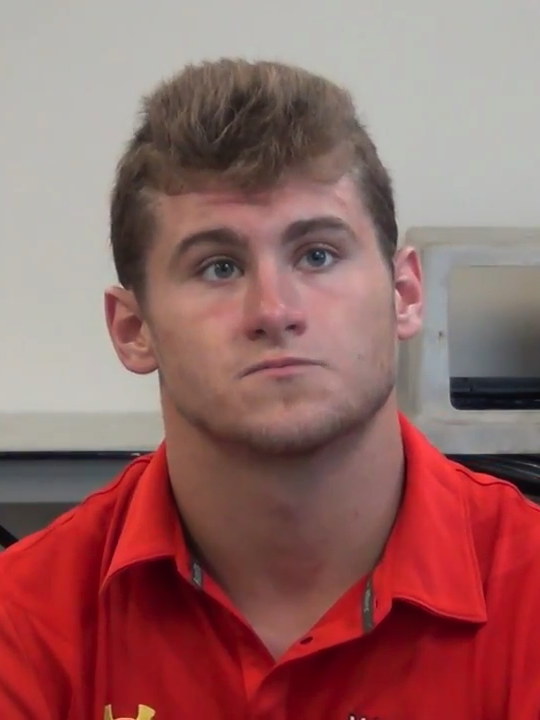
- Funk in 2017

No. 34, 36, 37
- Position: Running back

Personal information
- Born: January 11, 1998 (age 28); Gaithersburg, Maryland, U.S.
- Listed height: 5 ft 10 in (1.78 m)
- Listed weight: 205 lb (93 kg)

Career information
- High school: Damascus (Damascus, Maryland)
- College: Maryland (2016–2020)
- NFL draft: 2021: 7th round, 233rd overall pick

Career history
- Los Angeles Rams (2021–2022); New Orleans Saints (2022)*; Indianapolis Colts (2022–2023); Miami Dolphins (2023)*; Baltimore Ravens (2023)*; Detroit Lions (2023)*; Jacksonville Jaguars (2024)*
- * Offseason or practice squad member only

Awards and highlights
- Super Bowl champion (LVI); Third-team All-Big Ten (2020)

Career NFL statistics as of 2024
- Rushing yards: 15
- Rushing average: 3.8
- Receptions: 1
- Receiving yards: 12
- Return yards: 88
- Stats at Pro Football Reference

Jake Funk (born January 11, 1998) is an American former professional football player who was a running back in the National Football League (NFL). He played college football for the Maryland Terrapins. In Maryland's four games during the 2020 season, which was shortened due to COVID-19, Funk averaged 129 rushing yards per game. He also led the Big Ten Conference and ranked second among all Football Bowl Subdivision running backs with an average of 8.6 rushing yards per carry. Funk was selected in the seventh round of the 2021 NFL draft by the Los Angeles Rams, and won a Super Bowl with the team in 2021.

== Early life ==
Funk attended Damascus High School, where he was a heavily lauded football player. Funk was named the 2015 Maryland Gatorade Player of the Year as well as The Washington Post All-Metro Offensive Player of the Year for the same year, also earning two consensus all-state selections. In the state championship game his senior year, Funk scored a title-game record seven rushing touchdowns against Dundalk High School. Funk finished his senior season as the Maryland state record holder for touchdowns in a season with 57.

=== Recruiting profile ===
Despite his success in high school, Funk was only a moderately-rated prospect, earning two-star ratings from ESPN and Rivals.com and three-star ratings from 247Sports.com and Scout.com. Despite this, he received scholarship offers from the three service academies (Army, Navy, and Air Force), Ivy League schools Harvard, Yale, and Penn, Group of Five schools Ohio, Old Dominion, and Charlotte, Football Championship Subdivision schools Towson and Bucknell, and Big Ten schools Wisconsin and his eventual destination Maryland. Though recruiters were concerned about Funk's speed, his strength and versatility on defense made him an intriguing option (Funk also played safety in high school), and he was recruited by at least one school as a linebacker. However, after receiving his offer from Maryland, Funk quickly committed to his hometown school, where he was the first commit for then-interim head coach Mike Locksley.

College recruiting
| Name | Hometown | School | Height | Weight | 40^{‡} | Commit date |
|---|---|---|---|---|---|---|
| Jake Funk; RB | Gaithersburg, MD | Damascus (MD) | 5 ft 11 in (1.80 m) | 198 lb (90 kg) | 4.63 | Oct 16, 2015 |
| Jake Funk; RB | Recruit ratings: Scout: Rivals: 247Sports: ESPN: (69) | | | | | |
Overall recruit ranking: 247Sports: 1421
Note: In many cases, Scout, Rivals, 247Sports, On3, and ESPN may conflict in their listings of height and weight.; In these cases, the average was taken. ESPN grades are on a 100-point scale.; Sources: "Jake Funk, 2016". Rivals.; "2016 Team Ranking". Rivals.com.

== College career ==
=== Freshman year ===
Funk did not redshirt, and debuted in a 2016 game against Howard University where he rushed for 59 yards and a touchdown. He caught his first career touchdown pass that year against Purdue. He ended the season with 29 carries for 136 yards and one touchdown (averaging 4.7 yards a carry), and seven receptions for 42 yards and one touchdown.

=== Sophomore year ===
Funk appeared in all 12 of Maryland's games during his sophomore season and ended the year with 27 carries for 145 yards (averaging 5.4 yards a carry) and four touchdowns, second-most on the team. He also caught one pass for four yards and a touchdown.

=== Junior year ===
Funk had an injury-shortened junior season, playing through a wrist injury before tearing his ACL.

=== Redshirt junior year ===
Due to his injury, Funk received an extra year of eligibility, and played in Maryland's first three games before tearing his ACL again in a game against Temple. Through the three games, Funk carried seventeen times for 173 yards and two touchdowns, and also caught four passes for 16 yards.

=== Redshirt senior year ===
Funk had his best statistical season after returning from his consecutive ACL tears. Playing during the COVID-19-shortened Big Ten Conference season, he was the team's primary option at running back after the departure of Javon Leake and Anthony McFarland Jr. to the NFL. Across Maryland's four games, Funk rushed 60 times for 519 yards, averaging 8.6 yards per carry, which ranked him first in the Big Ten and second among all Football Bowl Subdivision running backs in yards per carry. He averaged 129 rushing yards a game as well, ranking him second in the Big Ten and eighth among FBS backs. Funk scored three rushing touchdowns and one receiving touchdown, and was named third-team All-Big Ten. At the end of the season, Funk ranked third on Maryland's list of yards per carry across a single season.

== Professional career ==
=== Pre-draft ===
Pre-draft measurables
| Height | Weight | Arm length | Hand span | 40-yard dash | 10-yard split | 20-yard split | 20-yard shuttle | Three-cone drill | Vertical jump | Broad jump | Bench press |
|---|---|---|---|---|---|---|---|---|---|---|---|
| 5 ft 10 1/4 in (1.78 m) | 204 lb (93 kg) | 30 1/4 in (0.77 m) | 9 in (0.23 m) | 4.49 s | 1.50 s | 2.59 s | 4.12 s | 6.71 s | 38.0 in (0.97 m) | 10 ft 2 in (3.10 m) | 22 reps |
All values from Pro Day

Despite having two seasons of eligibility remaining due to injury and NCAA policy surrounding COVID-19 and a chance to return as a starting back for Maryland, Funk opted to enter the 2021 NFL draft. Due to his perception as a primarily straight-line runner who was not particularly elusive, Sports Illustrated speculated that he would go undrafted, but could potentially find a role as a special teams player.

After Funk's performance at Maryland's pro day, draft analyst Mel Kiper mused that Funk could potentially be a late-round draft pick or an undrafted free agent: "I think he's going to fight his way onto a roster. He’s a competitive runner. He's a battler. He just puts his nose in there and he just fights and he's quick to the hole. He's shown home run-hitting ability where he can outrace the cornerback, safeties to the end zone, to the pay dirt. He'll catch the ball, he'll block. He's just a guy that gives you everything he has."

=== Los Angeles Rams ===
Funk was selected in the seventh round (233rd overall) by the Los Angeles Rams. In post-draft interviews, Funk indicated that he "never gave up faith," and that he was looking forward to his likely role as a special teams player. On May 16, 2021, Funk signed his four-year rookie contract with the Rams.

On October 18, 2021, coach Sean McVay announced a day after a Week 6 win over the New York Giants that Funk had suffered a hamstring injury and was placed on injured reserve on October 18. He was activated on December 21. Funk won Super Bowl LVI when the Rams defeated the Cincinnati Bengals 23-20.

On October 11, 2022, Funk was waived by the Los Angeles Rams.

=== New Orleans Saints ===
On October 12, 2022, Funk was signed to the practice squad of the New Orleans Saints. He was released on November 8.

=== Indianapolis Colts ===
On November 10, 2022, Funk was signed to the Indianapolis Colts practice squad. He was promoted to the active roster on January 3, 2023.

On August 29, 2023, Funk was waived by the Colts and re-signed to the practice squad. He was promoted to the active roster on September 12. He was waived on October 7.

=== Miami Dolphins ===
On October 10, 2023, Funk was signed to the Miami Dolphins practice squad. He was released on November 18, 2023.

=== Baltimore Ravens ===
On December 19, 2023, Funk was signed to the Baltimore Ravens practice squad. He was released on January 10, 2024.

=== Detroit Lions ===
On January 23, 2024, Funk signed with the practice squad of the Detroit Lions. He signed a reserve/future contract on January 30, 2024. He was waived on August 27, 2024.

=== Jacksonville Jaguars ===
On October 1, 2024, Funk signed with the Jacksonville Jaguars practice squad. He was released on November 5.

== Personal life ==
Funk hails from a family of athletes. His father, Jim, was a football player for Penn State and his mother, A’Lisa, was a national title-winning swimmer at Clarion University of Pennsylvania. Two of Funk's grandparents were also athletes at Penn State, and his grandmother Jean was one of Penn State's first female athletes, competing for the men's rifle team. Funk has a brother, Jordan, who played one year of football for Army before transferring to James Madison. He also has a half-brother, who played lacrosse at Ohio State University and professionally for the Minnesota Swarm. His half-brother went on to earn a doctorate from the University of Maryland, Baltimore, he owns several physical therapy clinics in Montgomery County and assisted Funk in his ACL rehab.

Funk began dating former The Bachelor winner Hannah Ann Sluss in November 2021. They announced their engagement on January 25, 2023. They married on June 26, 2024. In June 2025, the couple announced they were expecting their first child.
