= Hannah Ann Sluss =

American television personality

- Born: April 25, 1996 (age 30); Knoxville, Tennessee, U.S.
- Education: King College
- Occupations: Television personality, model
- Television: The Bachelor
- Spouse: Jake Funk (m. 2024)
- Children: 1

Hannah Ann Sluss (born April 25, 1996) is an American television personality who came to national prominence in 2020, as the winner of season 24 of The Bachelor, starring Peter Weber.

== Early life ==
Sluss was born in Knoxville, Tennessee to parents Jennifer and Rick. She has a sister, Haley, and a brother, Wade.

== Career ==
Sluss has modeled for most of her life in multiple ads. She has also competed in pageants. In the Miss Tennessee pageant, she was the first runner-up in 2015 and 2018, came in fourth place in 2017, and was the second runner-up in 2014. She was also Miss North Knoxville.

In 2019, she was cast in season 24 of The Bachelor, starring pilot Peter Weber. Filming took place in the fall of 2019. She was officially announced as a contestant on December 16, 2019. She was the winner of the season and got engaged to Weber on the finale. On After the Final Rose, it was revealed Weber called off their engagement because he was still in love with runner-up Madison Prewett. She appeared on The Ellen DeGeneres Show after the season ended.

She appeared on The Ultimate Surfer in September 2021 along with Mike Johnson. She got surf lessons from the contestants and got to choose who gets to move on.

== Personal life ==
Sluss is a Christian. Sluss began dating NFL running back Jake Funk in November 2021. They announced their engagement on January 25, 2023. In June 2024, the couple married in Italy. In June 2025, the couple announced they were expecting their first child. On November 20, 2025, the couple welcomed their first child.

== Filmography ==
=== Television ===
Year	Title	Title	Notes
2020	The Bachelor	Herself	Winner; season 24
2020	The Ellen DeGeneres Show	Herself	Season 17
2020	The Bachelor: The Greatest Seasons – Ever!	Herself	Episode; Kaitlyn Bristowe
2021	The Ultimate Surfer	Herself	Season 1, Episode 6

=== Music videos ===
Year	Title	Artist
2018	I Don't Know About You	Chris Lane

== Awards and nominations ==
Year	Award	Category	Nominated work	Result	Ref.
2020	People's Choice Awards	The Competition Contestant of 2020	The Bachelor	Nominated	

Awards and achievements
Preceded by Cassie Randolph	The Bachelor winner Season 24	Succeeded by Rachael Kirkconnell
