= Kelsey Weier =

American television host and former Miss Iowa

- Born: April 3, 1991 (age 35); West Des Moines, Iowa, U.S.
- Height: 5 ft 7 in (1.70 m)
- Beauty pageant titleholder
- Title: Miss Iowa USA 2017
- Hair color: Blonde
- Eye color: Blue
- Major competitions: Miss USA 2017 (Unplaced)

Kelsey Weier (born April 3, 1991) is an American TV host and beauty pageant titleholder. She received national recognition after appearing as a contestant on season 24 of The Bachelor. She was eliminated during week 8 by Peter Weber. She appeared on season 7 of Bachelor in Paradise. She was eliminated week 1. Prior to her television career, Weier had been crowned Miss Iowa USA in 2017.

== Personal life ==
Weier is originally from West Des Moines, Iowa. Prior to becoming a television personality she attended cosmetology school and worked as a professional color and extensions specialist, as well as a professional clothier for custom clothing company Tom James. She has a younger twin sister Kayla. When she was in the seventh grade her father left the family to start a new life in Mexico. She did not speak to him for 12 years but has since attempted to rekindle their relationship.

== Pageantry ==
Weier began pageantry at a young age after she was encouraged to compete when her youngest sister Kalason competed in Miss Iowa Teen USA a year before, Weier competed in Miss Iowa USA 2015, placed second runner-up to eventual winner Taylor Even, the following year she came back to compete in the same pageant competition, finished first runner-up to eventual winner Alissa Morrison. Weier returned for the following year and won the title as Miss Iowa USA 2017, crowned by outgoing titleholder Morrison.

As Miss Iowa USA 2017, Weier had an opportunity to compete in Miss USA 2017 competition being held at Mandalay Bay Events Center in Las Vegas, Nevada. She did not place in the competition and it was won by Kára McCullough of District of Columbia.

Awards and achievements
Preceded by Alissa Morrison	Miss Iowa USA; 2017	Succeeded by Jenny Valliere
