= The Ellen DeGeneres Show season 17 =

The Ellen DeGeneres Show
- Season 17
- Starring: Ellen DeGeneres
- No. of episodes: 188

Release
- Original release: September 6, 2019 – July 9, 2020

Season chronology
- ← Previous; Season 16 Next → Season 18

This is a list of episodes of the seventeenth season of The Ellen DeGeneres Show (often stylized as ellen17), which began airing Monday, September 9, 2019.

== Episodes ==
No. overall	No. in season	Original release date	Guests
2,744	1	September 6, 2019	Taye Diggs, Amanda Seales, Brockhampton, Jim Parsons
Special Guest Host tWitch, Iain Armitage
2,745	2	September 9, 2019	Kylie Jenner, Kris Jenner, Alyson Stoner, Dr Phil
Season 17 Premiere
2,746	3	September 10, 2019	Melissa McCarthy, Jerry Springer
2,747	4	September 11, 2019	Chrissy Teigen, Chance the Rapper, Maury Povich
2,748	5	September 12, 2019	Reese Witherspoon
2,749	6	September 13, 2019	Brad Pitt, Sean Hayes, Naomi Osaka
2,750	7	September 16, 2019	Kelly Clarkson, Jennifer Lopez
2,751	8	September 17, 2019	Simon Cowell, Clairo
2,752	9	September 18, 2019	Katy Perry, Renée Zellweger
2,753	10	September 19, 2019	Sarah Hyland
Special Guest Host Dax Shepard
2,754	11	September 20, 2019	Wanda Sykes
2,755	12	September 23, 2019	Oprah Winfrey, Lil Nas X, Anthony Anderson
2,756	13	September 24, 2019	Demi Moore, Lenny Kravitz, Of Monsters and Men, Kalen Allen
2,757	14	September 25, 2019	Ken Jeong, Monsta X
2,758	15	September 26, 2019	Randall Park, Lady Antebellum
Special Guest Hosts Beth Behrs and Whitney Cummings
2,759	16	September 27, 2019	Natalie Portman, Mario Lopez, Party Bros Chad Kroeger and JT Parr
2,760	17	September 30, 2019	John Cena, Pete Yorn
2,761	18	October 1, 2019	Tiffany Haddish
2,762	19	October 2, 2019	Tyler Perry, Kane Brown
2,763	20	October 3, 2019	Cardi B, Chance the Rapper and T.I., Nacho Figueras, The Highwomen
2,764	21	October 4, 2019	Adam DeVine, Lewis Capaldi
Special Guest Host Sean Hayes
2,765	22	October 7, 2019	Adam Levine and Maroon 5, Nicholas Braun
2,766	23	October 8, 2019	Jonas Brothers, Kieran Culkin
2,767	24	October 9, 2019	Woody Harrelson, SuperM
2,768	25	October 10, 2019	Michael Douglas, Justin Bieber
2,769	26	October 11, 2019	Nick Cannon, Nicole Scherzinger, Josh Radin
Special Guest Host tWitch with Guest DJ Kalen Allen
2,770	27	October 14, 2019	Howard Stern
2,771	28	October 15, 2019	Nicole Kidman, Charlize Theron, Margot Robbie, Midland
2,772	29	October 16, 2019	Jessica Biel, Alfie Allen
2,773	30	October 17, 2019	Scarlett Johansson, Joel Kinnaman, Cast of Fresh off the Boat
2,774	31	October 18, 2019	Helen Mirren, Jenna Dewan, Bebe Rexha
Special Guest Host Sean Hayes
2,775	32	October 21, 2019	Ellen Tube Highlight Show
2,776	33	October 22, 2019	Keegan-Michael Key
2,777	34	October 23, 2019	Ali Wong, Dr. Oz, Aidan McCann
2,778	35	October 24, 2019	Loni Love, Max Greenfield, Ariel Winter, ZaZa
Special Guest Host tWitch
2,779	36	October 25, 2019	Ciara, Chris Janson, Hannah Brown
Special Guest Host Justin Hartley
2,780	37	October 28, 2019	Jennifer Aniston, Bob Iger, Charlie Puth, Justin Bieber
2,781	38	October 29, 2019	Ewan McGregor, Andy Richter, The Clairvoyants
Special Guest Host Howie Mandel
2,782	39	October 30, 2019	Diane Keaton, Saoirse Ronan
2,783	40	October 31, 2019	Jason Momoa, Adrienne Houghton
Ellen's Halloween Spectacular!
2,784	41	November 1, 2019	Garth Brooks, Greta Thunberg
2,785	42	November 4, 2019	Maya Rudolph & Kristen Wiig, Dr. Ruth
2,786	43	November 5, 2019	Shia LaBeouf, Jon Dorenbos
2,787	44	November 6, 2019	Kerry Washington, Meghan Trainor
2,788	45	November 7, 2019	Steve Carell, Ashley Graham
2,789	46	November 8, 2019	Kristen Bell
Special Guest Host Ken Jeong, Modern Family, The Killers, Lady Gaga
2,790	47	November 11, 2019	Matt Damon
2,791	48	November 12, 2019	Laura Dern, Noah Jupe
2,792	49	November 13, 2019	Ray Romano
2,793	50	November 14, 2019	David Spade, Steve Spangler
2,794	51	November 15, 2019	Tracee Ellis Ross, Lena Waithe
Special Guest Host John Legend
2,795	52	November 18, 2019	Chadwick Boseman, Cold War Kids, Korian Majette
2,796	53	November 19, 2019	Helen Hunt & Paul Reiser
'Spill the Tea' - Bachelor Edition
2,797	54	November 20, 2019	Brie Larson, Julie Andrews
2,798	55	November 21, 2019	Eric Stonestreet, Kat Dennings
2,799	56	November 22, 2019	Idina Menzel, Evan Rachel Wood, Anthony Ramos
Special Guest Host Josh Gad
2,800	57	November 25, 2019	Victoria Beckham
12 Days of Giveaways Preview
2,801	58	November 26, 2019	Tom Hanks
Black Friday Giveaways with Chrissy Teigen
2,802	59	November 27, 2019	Dakota Johnson, Zack Gottsagen
2,803	60	December 2, 2019	Rob Lowe, Zara Larsson
Day 1 of 12 Days!
2,804	61	December 3, 2019	Jimmy Kimmel, Jennifer Beals, Kacey Musgraves
Day 2 of 12 Days!
2,805	62	December 4, 2019	Will Smith & Martin Lawrence, Sheryl Crow & Stevie Nicks
Day 3 of 12 Days!
2,806	63	December 5, 2019	Eddie Murphy
Day 4 of 12 Days!
2,807	64	December 6, 2019	Oscar Isaac, Camila Cabello
Day 5 of 12 Days
2,808	65	December 9, 2019	Clint Eastwood
Day 6 of 12 Days
2,809	66	December 10, 2019	Dwayne Johnson
Day 7 of 12 Days
2,810	67	December 11, 2019	Kevin Hart
Day 8 of 12 Days
2,811	68	December 12, 2019	Octavia Spencer
Day 9 of 12 Days
2,812	69	December 13, 2019	Blake Shelton, Ayesha Curry
Day 10 of 12 Days
2,813	70	December 16, 2019	Adam Sandler, Billy Crudup
Day 11 of 12 Days
2,814	71	December 17, 2019	Kim Kardashian West
Day 12 of 12 Days
2,815	72	December 18, 2019	Harry Styles, John Boyega
2,816	73	December 19, 2019	Henry Winkler, Shin Lim
2,817	74	December 20, 2019	Best of Ellen Season 17
2,818	75	December 23, 2019	Jenna Fischer & Angela Kinsey, Idina Menzel
Special Guest Host Ellie Kemper
2,819	76	January 6, 2020	Awkwafina, Mario Lopez
2,820	77	January 7, 2020	Kate McKinnon, O'Shea Jackson Jr.
2,821	78	January 8, 2020	Michael B. Jordan, Rex Orange County
2,822	79	January 9, 2020	Jamie Foxx, Liv Tyler, Dua Lipa
2,823	80	January 10, 2020	Catherine O'Hara & Annie Murphy
Special Guest Hosts Eugene Levy & Dan Levy
2,824	81	January 13, 2020	Steve Harvey, Zoë Kravitz
Ellen's Best of the Decade
2,825	82	January 14, 2020	Rami Malek, will.i.am & the Black Eyed Peas
Special Guest Host Robert Downey Jr.
2,826	83	January 15, 2020	Chris Martin & Coldplay
2,827	84	January 16, 2020	Aubrey Plaza, Aubrey Emmons Anderson
2,828	85	January 17, 2020	Milo Ventimiglia, Sam Waterston & Martin Sheen
Special Guest Hosts Jane Fonda & Lily Tomlin
2,829	86	January 20, 2020	Mark Wahlberg, Black Pumas
2,830	87	January 21, 2020	Dax Shepard, Nicole Avant
2,831	88	January 22, 2020	Colin Farrell, Nikkie de Jager, Jonas Brothers
2,832	89	January 23, 2020	Wanda Sykes, Americas Got Talent Contestants Duo Transcend
2,833	90	January 24, 2020	Will Ferrell, Selena Gomez
Special Guest Host Jennifer Aniston
2,834	91	January 27, 2020	Emily Blunt, Hunter Woodhall, Duo Transcend
2,835	92	January 28, 2020	Justin Bieber, Tanya Tucker & Brandi Carlile
Ellen's Birthday Extravaganza
2,836	93	January 29, 2020	Hoda Kotb, Lior Suchard
2,837	94	January 30, 2020	Kendall Jenner
Ellen's Super Bowl Show
2,838	95	January 31, 2020	Matt Bomer
Special Guest Host Sean Hayes
2,839	96	February 3, 2020	Diane Keaton, Lior Suchard
2,840	97	February 4, 2020	Julia Louis-Dreyfus
2,841	98	February 5, 2020	Julie Bowen
2,842	99	February 6, 2020	Hillary Clinton
2,843	100	February 7, 2020	Ice Cube, Jersey Shore: Family Vacation cast, Green Day
Special Guest Hosts Martha Stewart & Snoop Dogg
2,844	101	February 10, 2020	John Krasinski
2,845	102	February 11, 2020	Robin Roberts, Dwyane Wade
2,846	103	February 12, 2020	Charles Barkley
2,847	104	February 13, 2020	Lauren Graham
2,848	105	February 14, 2020	Gwyneth Paltrow
Special Guest Host John Legend
2,849	106	February 17, 2020	Melissa McCarthy, KJ Apa
2,850	107	February 18, 2020	Harrison Ford
2,851	108	February 19, 2020	Chris Pratt
2,852	109	February 20, 2020	Kate Hudson & Oliver Hudson, Tones and I
2,853	110	February 21, 2020	Mayor Pete Buttigieg
2,854	111	February 24, 2020	Trevor Noah
2,855	112	February 25, 2020	Cher
2,856	113	February 26, 2020	Kristen Bell
2,857	114	February 27, 2020	Kris Jenner
2,858	115	February 28, 2020	Jesse Tyler Ferguson
Special Guest Host Sean Hayes
2,859	116	March 2, 2020	Judy Sheindlin, Jim Parsons
2,860	117	March 3, 2020	Senator Elizabeth Warren, Khalid, Justin Bieber
2,861	118	March 4, 2020	David Beckham, Usher, Justin Bieber & Quavo
2,862	119	March 5, 2020	Demi Lovato, Justin Bieber
2,863	120	March 6, 2020	Justin Bieber, Jhené Aiko, Miguel & Future
Special Guest Host Demi Lovato
2,864	121	March 9, 2020	Ed O'Neill
2,865	122	March 10, 2020	Mandy Moore, Cast of Love Is Blind
2,866	123	March 11, 2020	Justin Timberlake, SZA & Anderson Paak
2,867	124	March 12, 2020	Ellen Looks Back at Some of the Show's Best Moments
2,868	125	March 13, 2020	Annette Bening, The Bachelor season 24 winner Hannah Ann Sluss
Special Guest Host Sean Hayes
2,869	126	March 16, 2020	Reese Witherspoon, Dixie Chicks
2,870	127	March 23, 2020	Maya Rudolph, Hilaria Baldwin
Special Guest Host Alec Baldwin
2,871	128	March 30, 2020	Chelsea Handler, Cast of Fresh off the Boat
Special Guest Host Sean Hayes
2,872	129	April 6, 2020	Chrissy Teigen & John Legend
2,873	130	April 7, 2020	Jennifer Lopez
2,874	131	April 8, 2020	Drew Brees & Brittany Brees
2,875	132	April 9, 2020	P!nk, David Spade
2,876	133	April 10, 2020	Zach Woods, Chris Martin & Coldplay
2,877	134	April 13, 2020	Bill Gates
2,878	135	April 14, 2020	Jimmy Kimmel, Cast of Modern Family
2,879	136	April 15, 2020	Jason Momoa
2,880	137	April 16, 2020	Kerry Washington, José Andrés
2,881	138	April 17, 2020	Governor Gavin Newsom, OneRepublic
2,882	139	April 20, 2020	Trevor Noah
2,883	140	April 21, 2020	Wanda Sykes
2,884	141	April 22, 2020	Kate Hudson
Ellen Celebrates Earth Day
2,885	142	April 23, 2020	Chris Hemsworth
2,886	143	April 27, 2020	Jim Parsons
2,887	144	April 28, 2020	Melissa McCarthy & Ben Falcone
2,888	145	April 29, 2020	Tiffany Haddish
2,889	146	April 30, 2020	Governor Andrew Cuomo
2,890	147	May 1, 2020	Julia Louis-Dreyfus
2,891	148	May 4, 2020	Gabrielle Union, Brooke Baldwin
2,892	149	May 5, 2020	Linda Cardellini
2,893	150	May 6, 2020	Christina Applegate
2,894	151	May 7, 2020	Courteney Cox
Ellen's Mother's Day Show
2,895	152	May 11, 2020	Ellie Kemper
2,896	153	May 12, 2020	Kristen Bell
2,897	154	May 13, 2020	Sarah Paulson, Tim McGraw
2,898	155	May 14, 2020	Anderson Cooper, Bill Murray
2,899	156	May 15, 2020	Ken Jeong, David Blaine
2,900	157	May 18, 2020	Kumail Nanjiani
2,901	158	May 19, 2020	Allison Janney, Kesha
2,902	159	May 20, 2020	Aidy Bryant
2,903	160	May 21, 2020	The Masked Singer winner Phil Donahue & Marlo Thomas
2,904	161	May 22, 2020	Rob Gronkowski, Hozier, Justin Bieber
2,905	162	May 25, 2020	Kevin Hart
2,906	163	May 26, 2020	Howie Mandel, Sarah Cooper
2,907	164	May 27, 2020	James Corden
2,908	165	May 28, 2020	James Marsden, Alanis Morissette
2,909	166	May 29, 2020	Recovered Coronavirus Patient Gregg Garfield
2,910	167	June 1, 2020	Jennifer Garner, The Killers
2,911	168	June 2, 2020	Jake Tapper, Ricky Martin
2,912	169	June 3, 2020	Hoda Kotb & Savannah Guthrie, James Bay
2,913	170	June 4, 2020	Atlanta Mayor Keisha Lance Bottoms, Van Jones
2,914	171	June 5, 2020	Congresswoman Val Demings, Bernice King
2,915	172	June 8, 2020	Ava DuVernay, John Lewis, Songland judges Ryan Tedder, Shane McAnally & Ester Dean
2,916	173	June 11, 2020	Stacey Abrams, Kareem Abdul-Jabbar
2,917	174	June 12, 2020	Dax Shepard
2,918	175	June 22, 2020	A Look Back at Ellen's Inspiring Guests
2,919	176	June 23, 2020	Ellen's Best Moments at Home!
2,920	177	June 24, 2020	Ellen's Favourite Moments with Her Kid Guests
2,921	178	June 25, 2020	The Best of Average Andy!
2,922	179	June 26, 2020	The Best of ellentube!
2,923	180	June 29, 2020	Ellen's Favourite Surprises
2,924	181	June 30, 2020	Ellen's Conversations About the Black Lives Matter Movement
2,925	182	July 1, 2020	Benee
A Look at the Best Moments from Season 17
2,926	183	July 2, 2020	Sam Fischer
Jennifer Aniston and Justin Timberlake in Memorable Moments from Season 17
2,927	184	July 3, 2020	Ellen shares more of her favorite moments from Season 17
Jennifer Aniston and Justin Timberlake in Memorable Moments from Season 17
2,928	185	July 6, 2020	Kiesza
More of the Best Moments from Season 17
2,929	186	July 7, 2020	Finneas
More of the Best Moments from Season 17
2,930	187	July 8, 2020	Riz Ahmed
Brad Pitt & Jamie Foxx unforgettable visits
2,931	188	July 9, 2020	Will Smith & Lenny Kravitz
Best surprises of Season 17
