= Katie Higgins Cook =

American marine aviator (born 1986)

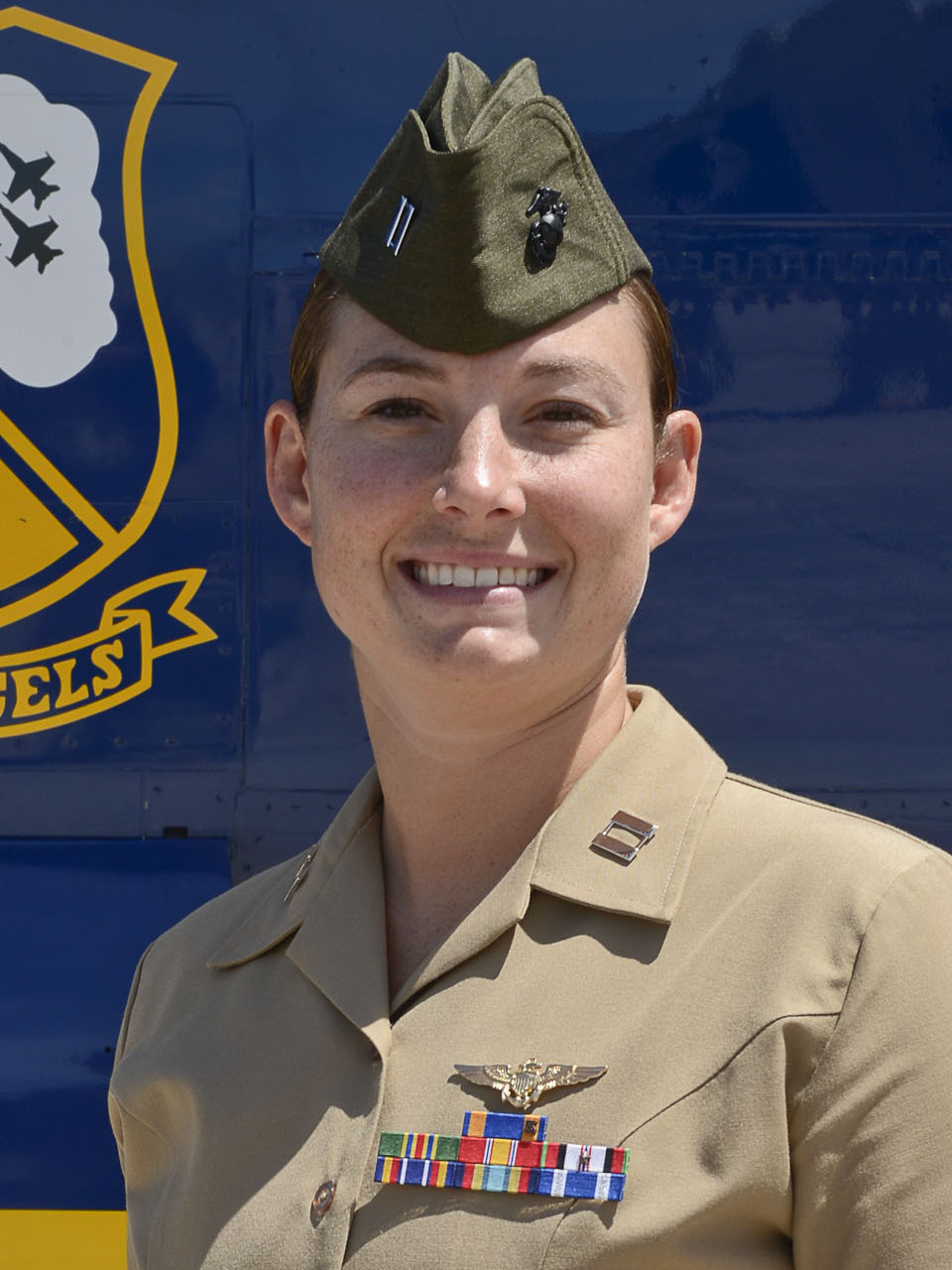
- Katie Higgins Cook in 2015
- Born: Katie Ann Johnson; August 27, 1986 (age 40); Jacksonville, Florida, U.S.
- Spouse: Dusty Cook
- Military career
- Branch: United States Marine Corps
- Rank: Major
- Known for: First female Blue Angels pilot

'

Katie Higgins Cook (née Johnson; born August 26,1986) is an American aviator and officer in the United States Marine Corps. In 2015, she became the first female Blue Angels pilot, and flew the Blue Angels’ C-130 transport plane Fat Albert for two seasons. Her first show with the Blue Angels demonstration team was in El Centro, California, in March 2015. Then known as Marine Captain Katie Higgins, she made her Blue Angels debut at the age of 28.

== Early life and education ==
Born in Jacksonville, Florida, Katie Johnson grew up in a military family that moved frequently, living in places including California and Japan. She is a third-generation pilot. Her father, Bill Johnson, was a 1981 Naval Academy graduate who flew an F/A-18 Hornet in the United States Navy and later worked as an engineer for Northrop Grumman. She graduated from W. T. Woodson High School in Fairfax, Virginia, in 2004.

Katie Johnson completed a Bachelor of Science degree in political science from the United States Naval Academy in Annapolis, Maryland, in 2008. Commissioned a Second Lieutenant in the U.S. Marine Corps, she went on to study international security at Georgetown University, where she completed a Master of Arts degree in 2009. She has a younger brother who also graduated from the Naval Academy in 2010, and works in explosives.

== Career ==
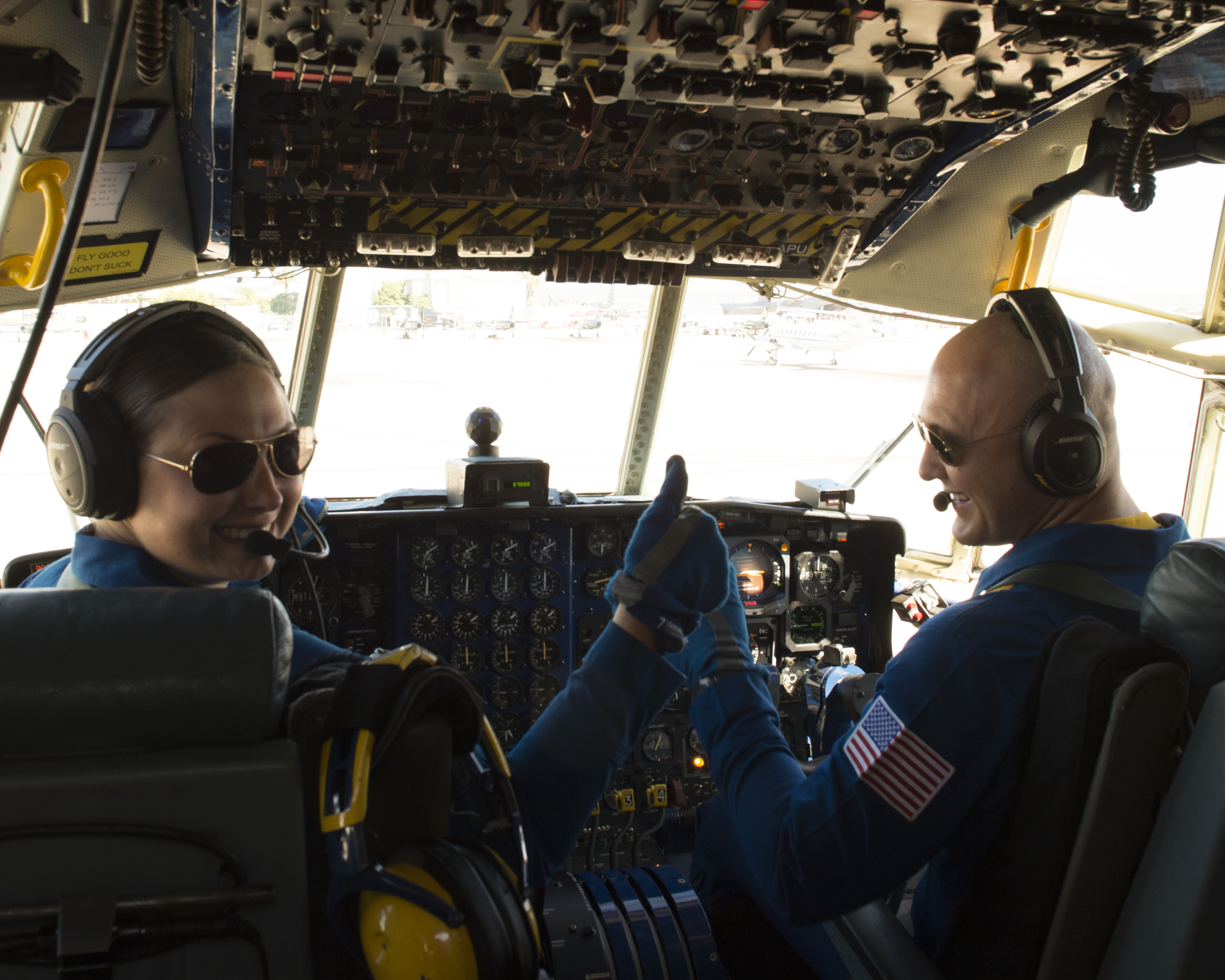
Higgins piloting Fat Albert with Major Mark Hamilton

Katie Higgins became a naval aviator with Marine Aerial Refueler Transport Squadron 252. She served in Afghanistan in support of Operation Enduring Freedom. At age 26, in her first action against the Taliban in 2013, she piloted a KC-130 (call sign "Filth02"), which fired two Hellfire missiles that eliminated an enemy position, saving the lives of a group of Marines. She also deployed to Africa with Special Purpose Marine Air-Ground Task Force Crisis-Response in support of contingency operations. By 2015, she had flown nearly 400 combat hours in seven countries.

=== Blue Angels ===
In July 2014, the U.S. Navy Flight Demonstration Squadron announced the selection of Marine Captain Higgins and other officers to the 2015 demonstration team. Higgins received repeated comments that the only reason she was selected was because she was a woman, but insisted that with the Blue Angels, "The candidate that is the best fit, gets the job – regardless of gender."

Katie Higgins Cook was performed her first Blue Angels demonstration in March 2015. The C-130 Hercules named Fat Albert, which she piloted on rotation with other Marines, is the opening act of every Blue Angels show lasting eight-and-a-half minutes. The fastest maneuver performed by Fat Albert is called the "flat path", flying at 370 miles per hour at 40 feet. Other maneuvers include the "parade pass", a 300-foot pass at a 60-degree angle, and the "high-pitch climb", a 45-degree climb to 1,200 feet, followed by a steep nose dive that causes weightlessness for passengers in the back of the plane.

In 2019, Katie Hiiggins Cook was promoted to the rank of major and by 2025 was a lieutenant colonel in the Marine Corps Reserve.

== Media appearances ==
In 2020, Cook made a guest appearance on the 24th season premiere of The Bachelor. During the episode, she helped bachelor Peter Weber, a Delta Air Lines pilot, organize a group date, in which he put the female contestants through a flight training program including a gyroscope ride.

Cook was recognized in American Valor: A Salute to Our Heroes, an Emmy-winning television special produced by the American Veterans Center and narrated by Harrison Ford.

== Personal life ==
Katie Higgins married fellow Blue Angels pilot Dusty Cook, whom she first met when they were both at VMGR-252 and started dating during their time at the Blue Angels team. They live in Texas with their children.

== Gallery ==
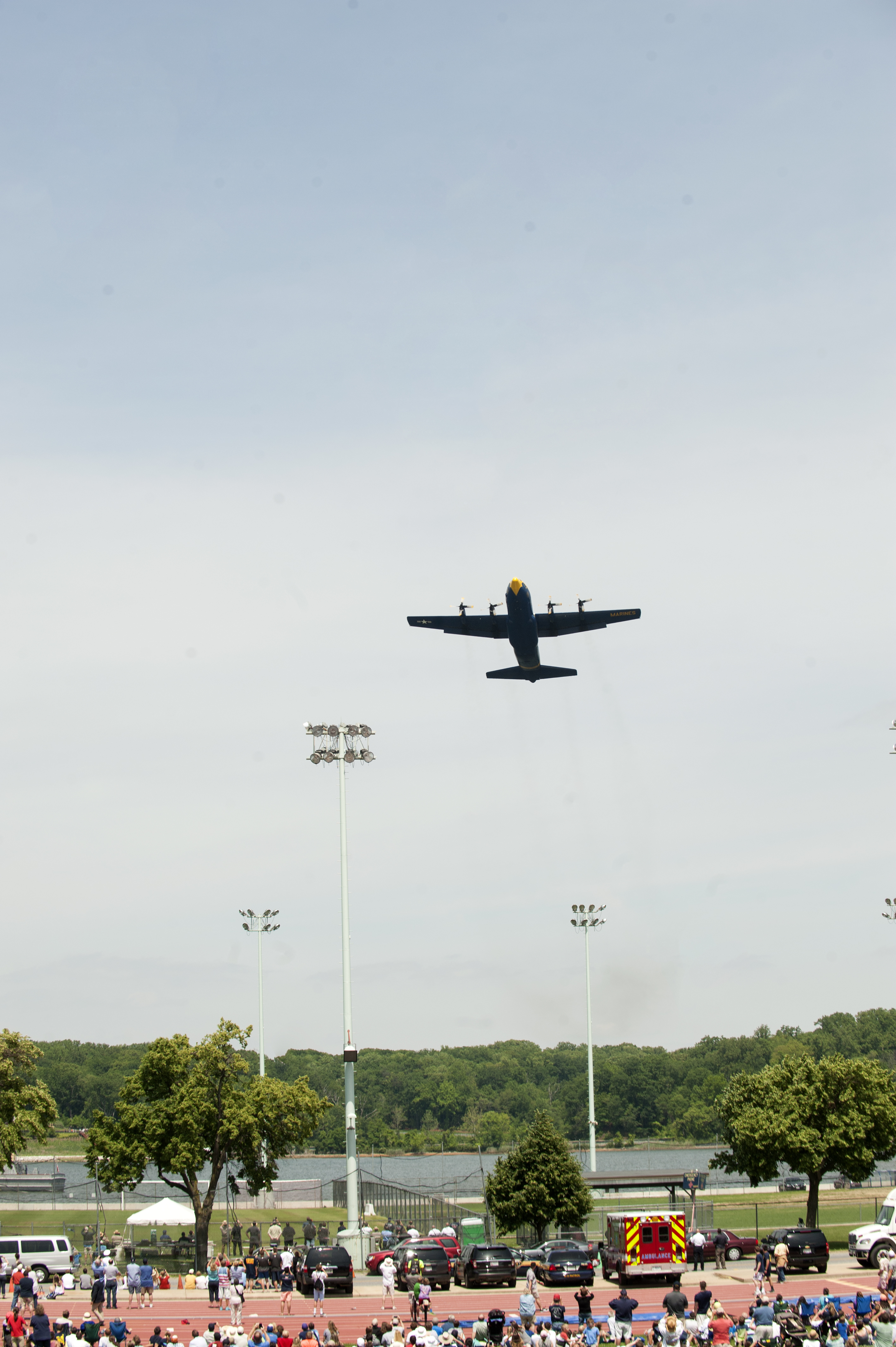
Blue Angels C-130 piloted by Captain Higgins, May 2015

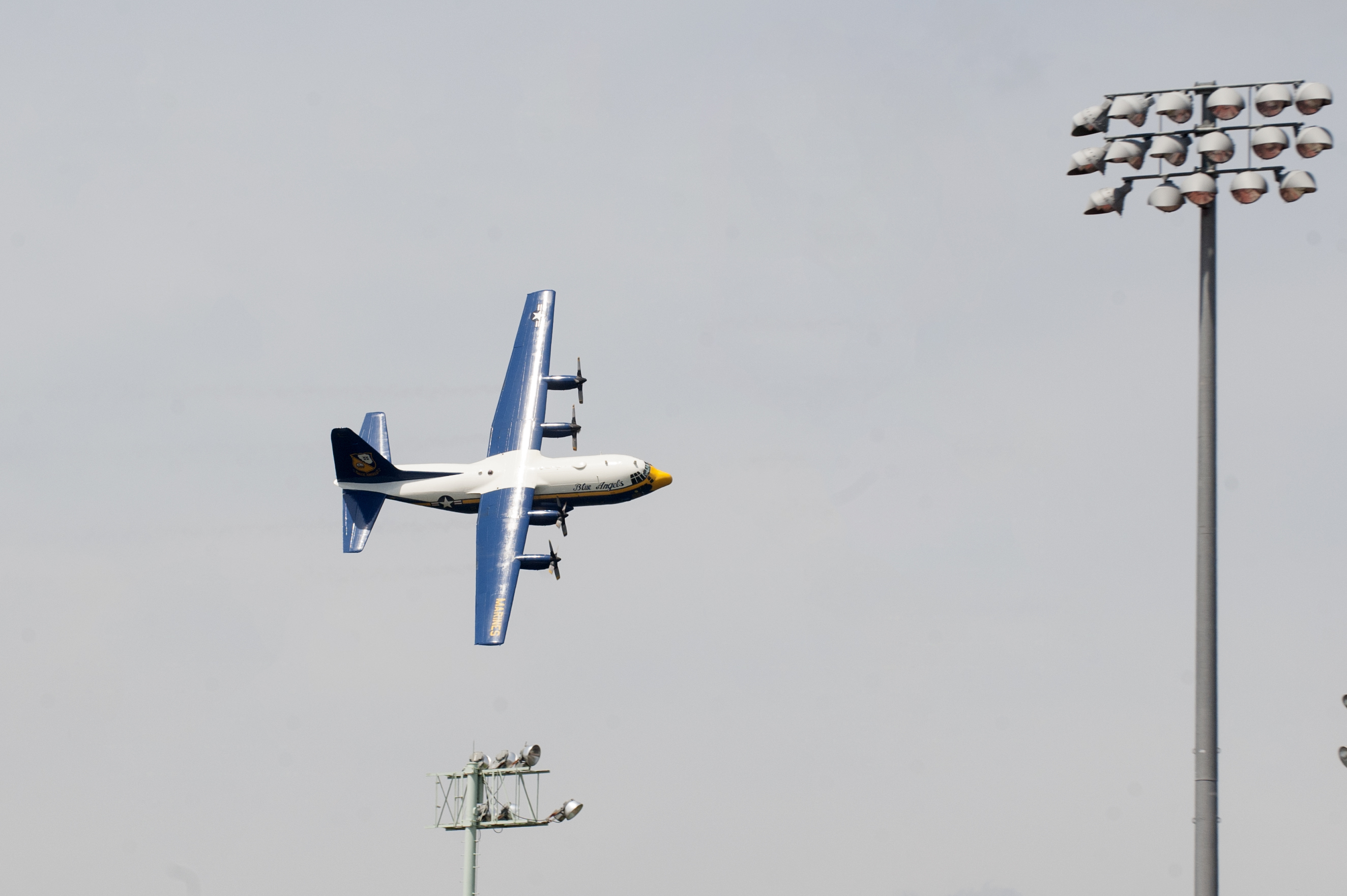
"Fat Albert" piloted by Higgins at U.S. Naval Academy, 2015

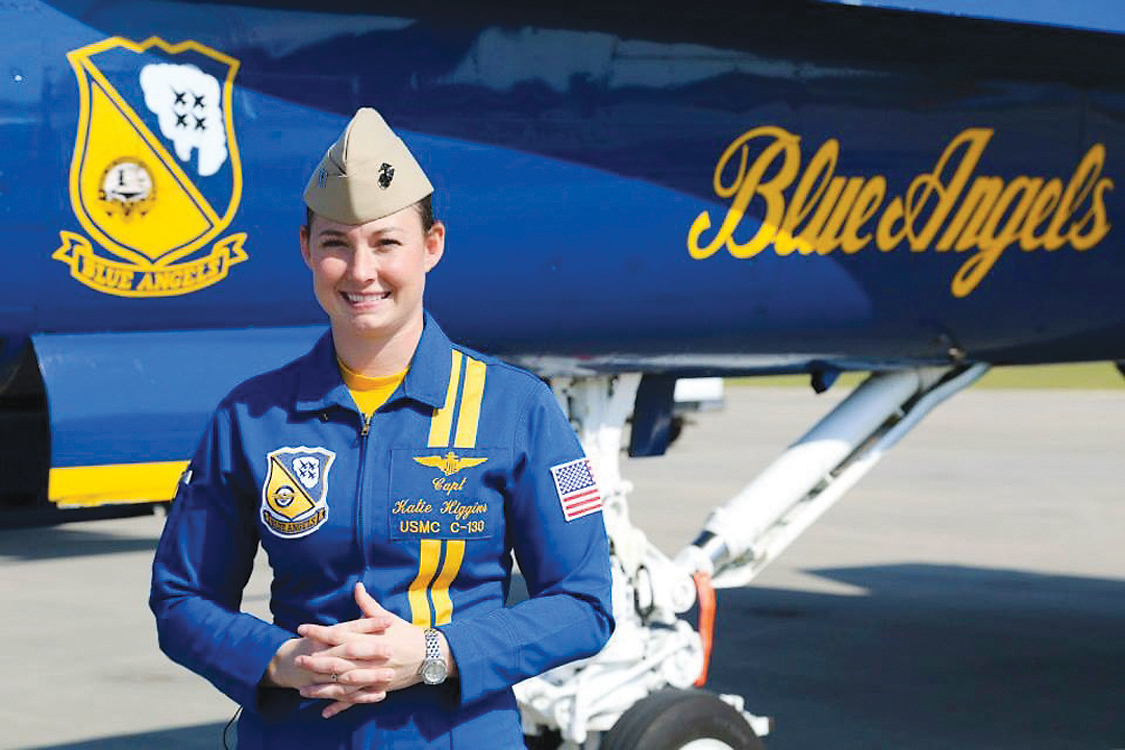
Captain Higgins speaking to media, April 2015

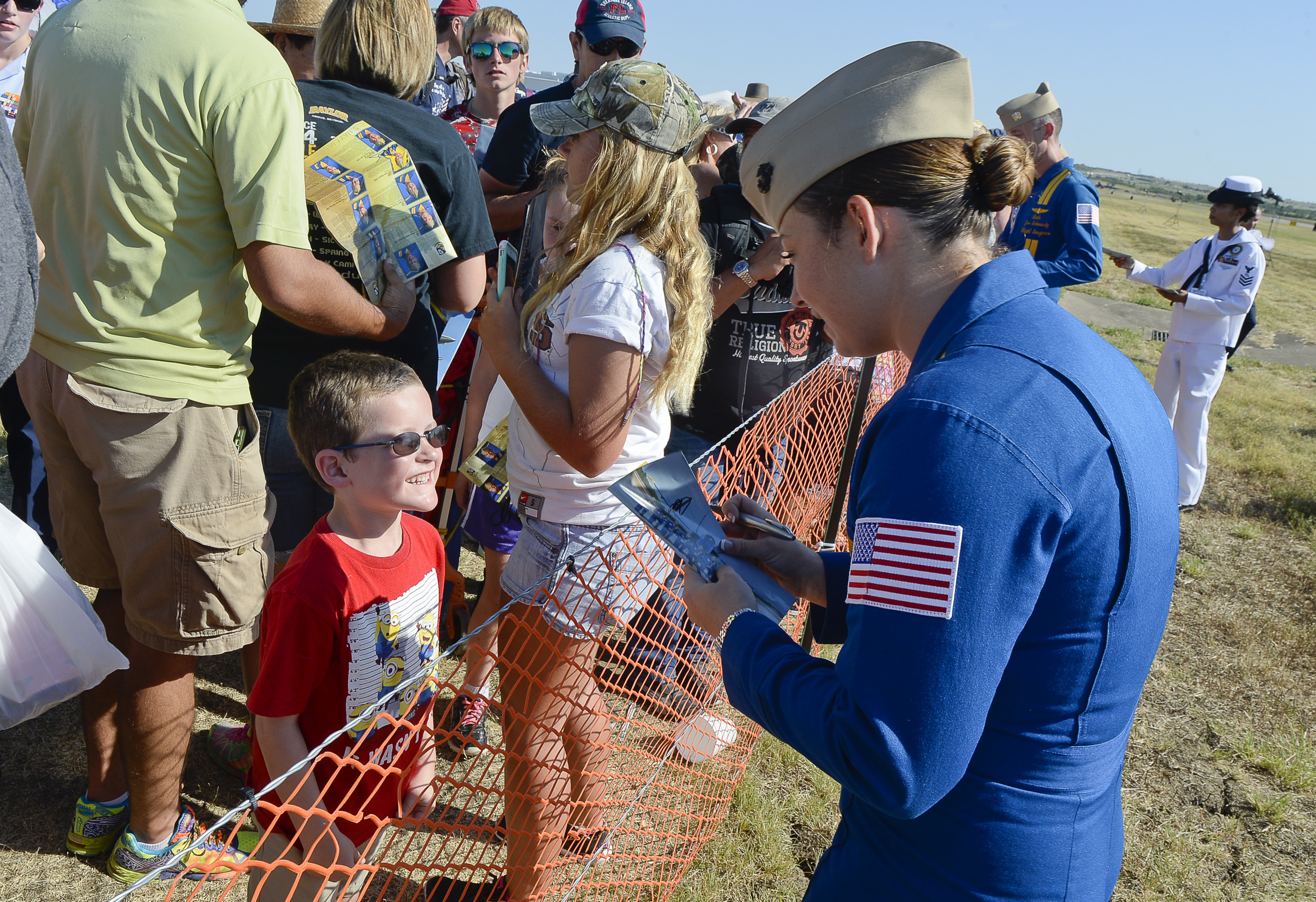
Higgins meeting fans, signing autographs, 2015

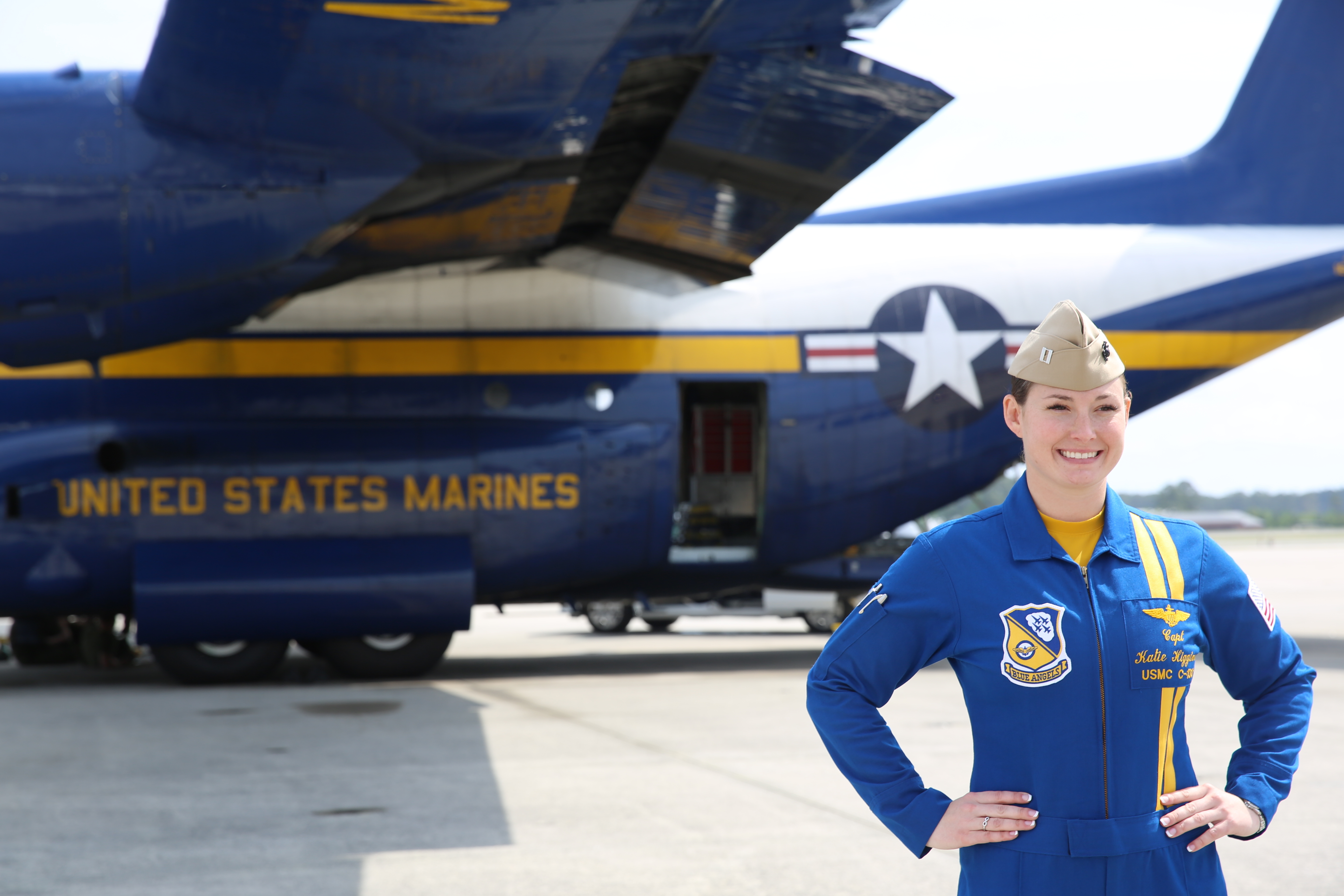
Captain Higgins posing in front of "Fat Albert", 2016

== See also ==
- Amanda Lee (pilot), first female Blue Angels fighter jet demonstration pilot
