= Miss Illinois World =

- Formation: 1951
- Type: Beauty pageant
- Location: Illinois
- Members: Miss World America (1951–present)
- Official language: English
- State Director: Madison Flomer
- Website: www.missworld-illinois.com

The Miss Illinois World competition is a beauty pageant that selects the representative for Illinois in the Miss World America pageant.

The current Miss Illinois World is Ansima Rosette Mamboleo of Maywood.

== Winners ==
Color key

- Declared as Winner/Ended as Miss World America
- Ended as runner-up
- Ended as one of the finalists or semifinalists
- Ended as special awards winner
- Ended as Miss USA

Year	Name	Hometown	Age (Note: Age at the time of the Miss World America pageant)	Placement at Miss World America	Special awards at Miss World America	Notes
2020	Ansima Rosette Mamboleo	Maywood	24	Top 15		Born in the Democratic Republic of the Congo and raised in South Africa.
2019	Alexandra Plotz	Geneva	25	Top 25		Previously Miss Illinois Teen USA 2012 and Top 16 semi-finalist at Miss Teen USA 2012, and Miss Illinois USA 2019 and a contestant at Miss USA 2019.
2018	did not compete					
2017	did not compete					
2016	Leslie Hawkins	Chicago	23	Top 12		
2016	Hiam Hafizuddin	Chicago	20			
2016	Maria Barrero	Chicago	24			
2015	Carlyn Bradarich	Homer Glen	24	Top 12	Beachwear	
Miss Illinois United States 2014
2014	Brittany Middlebrooks					
Miss Illinois World
2013	No titleholders as Miss World America was designated from 2006 to 2013.					
2012	No titleholders as Miss World America was designated from 2006 to 2013.					
2011	No titleholders as Miss World America was designated from 2006 to 2013.					
2010	No titleholders as Miss World America was designated from 2006 to 2013.					
2009	No titleholders as Miss World America was designated from 2006 to 2013.					
2008	No titleholders as Miss World America was designated from 2006 to 2013.					
2007	No titleholders as Miss World America was designated from 2006 to 2013.					
2006	No titleholders as Miss World America was designated from 2006 to 2013.					
2005	No known representatives from Illinois in 2005.					
2004	Nancy Randall	Chicago	24	US Miss World 2004		2nd Runner-Up at Miss World 2004. Also won Miss World Beach Beauty at Miss World. Later 1st Runner-Up at Miss Earth United States 2006.
2003	No known representatives from Illinois in 2003.					
2002	No titleholders as Miss World America was designated from 1995 to 2002.					
2001	No titleholders as Miss World America was designated from 1995 to 2002.					
2000	No titleholders as Miss World America was designated from 1995 to 2002.					
1999	No titleholders as Miss World America was designated from 1995 to 2002.					
1998	No titleholders as Miss World America was designated from 1995 to 2002.					
1997	No titleholders as Miss World America was designated from 1995 to 2002.					
1996	No titleholders as Miss World America was designated from 1995 to 2002.					
1995	No titleholders as Miss World America was designated from 1995 to 2002.					
1994	Brenda Blazek					
1993	Julie Nogal					
1992	Gina Maggio					
Miss Illinois USA 1981-1991
1991	Lisa Morgan	Inverness	21	Top 6		Miss Teenage America 1986.
1990	Karla Myers	Chicago	22	Top 12		
1989	Kelly Holub	Buffalo Grove	22	Top 10	Best State Costume	
1988	Gina Zordani	Palos Heights	23	Top 10		
1987	Joan Berge	Arlington Heights	21	Top 11		
1986	Tricia Bach	Elmhurst	22	Top 10		Miss Teen All American 1983, sister of Miss Illinois USA 1985
1985	Laura Ann Bach	Elmhurst	23	2nd Runner-Up		1st runner up at Miss Oktoberfest 1986, sister of Miss Illinois USA 1986
1984	LaVonne Misselle	Toluca	19	Top 10		
1983	Vanessa Romine	Rockford	24			
1982	Carla Danielson	Chicago	21			
1981	Leslie Renfrow	Chicago	21			4th Runner-Up at Miss Oktoberfest 1980
Miss Illinois World
1980	Annette Marroquin					
1979	Katherine Ann Kivisto				Miss Photogenic	
1978	Barbara Figarola	Chicago	20			Married name is Barbara Figarola Weber. Mother of Peter Weber who was a contestant on Season 15 of The Bachelorette USA and star of Season 24 of The Bachelor USA.
1977	Susan Barbara Matison	Earlville	21			
1976	Laura Jayne Adams					
1975	Carrie Anne Kravchuk					
1974	Suzanne Piché	Wheaton	19			Later Miss Illinois USA 1978.
1973	Lea Ann Minalga					
1972	Monika Kelier					
1971	Leah Anderson	Elburn	23			
1970	Sandra "Sandie" Anne Wolsfeld	Wheaton	24	Miss World USA 1970		Top 15 semi-finalist at Miss World 1970.
1969	Patsy Whitecotton					
1968	Cyle Bohmer					
1967	Izolda Snarskis					
1966	Lois Scott					Competed as Illinois.
1966	Pat Adair	Chicago				Competed as Chicago, Illinois.
1965	Bonnie Komstock					
1964	Susan Rye			4th Runner-Up		Competed as Illinois.
1964	Jana Flores	Chicago		2nd Runner-Up		Competed as Chicago, Illinois
1963	Janice Hope Jordan			Top 15		
1962	Jo Peterson					Competed as Illinois.
1962	Marite Ozers	Chicago	18			Competed as Chicago, Illinois. Later Miss Illinois USA 1963 and winner at Miss USA 1963, representing Illinois. Top 15 semi-finalist at Miss Universe 1963. Born in the Latvian SSR in the Soviet Union (now Latvia).
1961	did not compete					
1960	Sharon Woods			2nd Runner-Up		
1959	No known representatives from Illinois in 1958 & 1959.					
1958	No known representatives from Illinois in 1958 & 1959.					
Miss Illinois USA 1953-1957
1957	Marianne Gaba	Chicago	18	Top 15		Playboy playmate September 1959
1956	Muriel Blair	Chicago	23			
1955	Diane Daniggelis	Chicago	18	Top 15		Winner of the 1955 National Press Photographers Pageant
1954	Celeste Ravel	Chicago	23	4th Runner-up		
1953	Myrna Hansen	Chicago	17	Miss USA 1953		1st Runner-Up at Miss Universe 1953; had been a finalist in the National Press Photographers pageant in 1953
Miss Illinois World
1952	No known representatives from Illinois in 1951 & 1952.					
1951	No known representatives from Illinois in 1951 & 1952.					

Notes to table
