= 46th People's Choice Awards =

Pop culture award show held in 2020

- Date: November 15, 2020
- Location: Barker Hangar; Santa Monica, California
- Country: United States
- Hosted by: Demi Lovato
- Website: pca.eonline.com

Television/radio coverage
- Network: E!

The 46th ceremony of the People's Choice Awards was held on November 15, 2020, to honor the best in popular culture for 2020. The show was hosted by Demi Lovato and was broadcast live by E! at the Barker Hangar in Santa Monica, California. The show had a 43% jump in viewership from the year prior and received generally good ratings from the viewers.

== Performances ==
- Justin Bieber – "Lonely" (with Benny Blanco), "Holy"
- Chloe x Halle – "Ungodly Hour"

== Presenters ==
Presenters were announced on November 14, 2020, the day before the ceremony.

- Demi Lovato – main show host
- Jameela Jamil – presented The Female Movie Star of 2020
- Christina Hendricks – presented The Drama TV Star of 2020
- Bebe Rexha – presented The Daytime Talk Show of 2020
- Addison Rae – presented The Country Artist of 2020
- Tyler, the Creator – presented Fashion Icon of 2020 to Tracee Ellis Ross
- Mario Lopez & Elizabeth Berkley Lauren – presented The Nighttime Talk Show of 2020
- Alison Brie – presented The Male Artist of 2020 and introduced Justin Bieber
- Armie Hammer – presented People's Icon of 2020 to Jennifer Lopez
- Karamo Brown – presented The Female TV Star of 2020
- Tiffany Haddish – presented People's Champion of 2020 to Tyler Perry
- Machine Gun Kelly – presented The Comedy Movie Star of 2020

== Winners and nominees ==
The nominees were announced in October 1.

Winners are listed first and are in bold.

=== Film ===
The Movie of 2020	The Comedy Movie of 2020
**Bad Boys for Life**; Birds of Prey; Extraction; Hamilton; The Invisible Man; The Old Guard; Project Power; Trolls World Tour	**The Kissing Booth 2**; Bill & Ted Face the Music; Eurovision Song Contest: The Story of Fire Saga; The King of Staten Island; Like a Boss; The Lovebirds; To All the Boys: P.S. I Still Love You; The Wrong Missy
The Action Movie of 2020	The Drama Movie of 2020
**Mulan**; Bad Boys for Life; Birds of Prey; Bloodshot; Extraction; The Old Guard; Project Power; Tenet	**Hamilton**; Dangerous Lies; Greyhound; The High Note; I Still Believe; The Invisible Man; The Photograph; The Way Back
The Family Movie of 2020	The Male Movie Star of 2020
**Onward**; The Call of the Wild; Dolittle; My Spy; Scoob!; Sonic the Hedgehog; Trolls World Tour; The Willoughbys	**Will Smith – Bad Boys for Life**; Vin Diesel – Bloodshot; Robert Downey Jr. – Dolittle; Jamie Foxx – Project Power; Tom Hanks – Greyhound; Chris Hemsworth – Extraction; Lin-Manuel Miranda – Hamilton; Mark Wahlberg – Spenser Confidential
The Female Movie Star of 2020	The Drama Movie Star of 2020
**Tiffany Haddish – Like a Boss**; Salma Hayek – Like a Boss; Vanessa Hudgens – Bad Boys for Life; Camila Mendes – Dangerous Lies; Elisabeth Moss – The Invisible Man; Issa Rae – The Lovebirds; Margot Robbie – Birds of Prey; Charlize Theron – The Old Guard	**Lin-Manuel Miranda – Hamilton**; Ben Affleck – The Way Back; KJ Apa – I Still Believe; Russell Crowe – Unhinged; Tom Hanks – Greyhound; Elisabeth Moss – The Invisible Man; Issa Rae – The Photograph; Tracee Ellis Ross – The High Note
The Comedy Movie Star of 2020	The Action Movie Star of 2020
**Joey King – The Kissing Booth 2**; Noah Centineo – To All the Boys: P.S. I Still Love You; Pete Davidson – The King of Staten Island; Will Ferrell – Eurovision Song Contest: The Story of Fire Saga; Salma Hayek – Like a Boss; Issa Rae – The Lovebirds; Keanu Reeves – Bill & Ted Face the Music; David Spade – The Wrong Missy	**Chris Hemsworth – Extraction**; Vin Diesel – Bloodshot; Jamie Foxx – Project Power; Vanessa Hudgens – Bad Boys for Life; Margot Robbie – Birds of Prey; Will Smith – Bad Boys for Life; Charlize Theron – The Old Guard; John David Washington – Tenet

=== TV ===
The Show of 2020	The Drama Show of 2020
**Grey's Anatomy**; The Bachelor; The Last Dance; The Masked Singer; Never Have I Ever; Outer Banks; This Is Us; Tiger King	**Riverdale**; Grey's Anatomy; Law & Order: Special Victims Unit; Outer Banks; Ozark; Power; This Is Us; The Walking Dead
The Comedy Show of 2020	The Reality Show of 2020
**Never Have I Ever**; Dead to Me; The Good Place; Grown-ish; Insecure; Modern Family; Saturday Night Live; Schitt's Creek	**Keeping Up with the Kardashians**; Below Deck Mediterranean; Love & Hip Hop: New York; Love is Blind; 90 Day Fiancé: Happily Ever After?; Queer Eye; The Real Housewives of Atlanta; The Real Housewives of Beverly Hills
The Competition Show of 2020	The Male TV Star of 2020
**The Voice**; America's Got Talent; American Idol; The Bachelor; The Challenge; The Masked Singer; RuPaul's Drag Race; Top Chef	**Cole Sprouse – Riverdale**; Jason Bateman – Ozark; Sterling K. Brown – This Is Us; Steve Carell – Space Force; Dan Levy – Schitt's Creek; Norman Reedus – The Walking Dead; Chase Stokes – Outer Banks; Jesse Williams – Grey's Anatomy
The Female TV Star of 2020	The Drama TV Star of 2020
**Ellen Pompeo – Grey's Anatomy**; Christina Applegate – Dead to Me; Danai Gurira – The Walking Dead; Mariska Hargitay – Law & Order: Special Victims Unit; Mandy Moore – This Is Us; Sandra Oh – Killing Eve; Lili Reinhart – Riverdale; Sofia Vergara – Modern Family	**Mandy Moore – This Is Us**; Sterling K. Brown – This Is Us; Danai Gurira – The Walking Dead; Mariska Hargitay – Law & Order: Special Victims Unit; Sandra Oh – Killing Eve; Ellen Pompeo – Grey's Anatomy; Cole Sprouse – Riverdale; Chase Stokes – Outer Banks
The Comedy TV Star of 2020	The Daytime Talk Show of 2020
**Sofia Vergara – Modern Family**; Christina Applegate – Dead to Me; Kristen Bell – The Good Place; Jameela Jamil – The Good Place; Dan Levy – Schitt's Creek; Kate McKinnon – Saturday Night Live; Issa Rae – Insecure; Yara Shahidi – Grown-ish	**The Ellen DeGeneres Show**; Good Morning America; The Kelly Clarkson Show; Live with Kelly and Ryan; Red Table Talk; Today; The View; The Wendy Williams Show
The Nighttime Talk Show of 2020	The Competition Contestant of 2020
**The Tonight Show Starring Jimmy Fallon**; The Daily Show with Trevor Noah; Full Frontal with Samantha Bee; Jimmy Kimmel Live!; Last Week Tonight with John Oliver; The Late Late Show with James Corden; The Late Show with Stephen Colbert; Watch What Happens Live with Andy Cohen	**Gigi Goode – RuPaul's Drag Race**; Kandi Burruss – The Masked Singer; Sammie Cimarelli – The Circle; Rob Gronkowski – The Masked Singer; Jaida Essence Hall – RuPaul's Drag Race; Just Sam – American Idol; Madison Prewett – The Bachelor; Hannah Ann Sluss – The Bachelor
The Reality TV Star of 2020	The Bingeworthy Show of 2020
**Khloé Kardashian – Keeping Up with the Kardashians**; Kandi Burruss – The Real Housewives of Atlanta; Kim Kardashian – Keeping Up with the Kardashians; Antoni Porowski – Queer Eye; Lisa Rinna – The Real Housewives of Beverly Hills; Darcey Silva & Stacey Silva – Darcey & Stacey; Jonathan Van Ness – Queer Eye; Porsha Williams – The Real Housewives of Atlanta	**Outer Banks**; Cheer; Love is Blind; Never Have I Ever; Normal People; Ozark; Schitt's Creek; Tiger King
The Sci-Fi/Fantasy Show of 2020
**Wynonna Earp**; The Flash; Legacies; Legends of Tomorrow; Locke & Key; Supergirl; Supernatural; The Umbrella Academy

=== Music ===
The Male Artist of 2020	The Female Artist of 2020
**Justin Bieber**; Bad Bunny; J Balvin; DaBaby; Drake; Lil Baby; Blake Shelton; The Weeknd	**Ariana Grande**; Cardi B; Miley Cyrus; Billie Eilish; Lady Gaga; Dua Lipa; Megan Thee Stallion; Taylor Swift
The Group of 2020	The Song of 2020
**BTS**; Blackpink; Chloe x Halle; CNCO; Dan + Shay; 5 Seconds of Summer; Jonas Brothers; Twenty One Pilots	**"Dynamite" – BTS**; "Break My Heart" – Dua Lipa; "Intentions" – Justin Bieber feat. Quavo; "Rain on Me" – Lady Gaga & Ariana Grande; "Rockstar" – DaBaby feat. Roddy Ricch; "Savage" – Megan Thee Stallion; "Stuck with U" – Ariana Grande & Justin Bieber; "WAP" – Cardi B feat. Megan Thee Stallion
The Album of 2020	The Country Artist of 2020
**Map of the Soul: 7 – BTS**; After Hours – The Weeknd; Changes – Justin Bieber; Chromatica – Lady Gaga; Folklore – Taylor Swift; Future Nostalgia – Dua Lipa; High Off Life – Future; YHLQMDLG – Bad Bunny	**Blake Shelton**; Kelsea Ballerini; Kane Brown; Luke Bryan; Luke Combs; Miranda Lambert; Thomas Rhett; Keith Urban
The Latin Artist of 2020	The New Artist of 2020
**Becky G**; Bad Bunny; J Balvin; Daddy Yankee; Karol G; Maluma; Nicky Jam; Ozuna	**Doja Cat**; Ava Max; Benee; Trevor Daniel; Conan Gray; Jack Harlow; Roddy Ricch; Saweetie
The Music Video of 2020	The Collaboration Song of 2020
**"Dynamite" – BTS**; "Blinding Lights" – The Weeknd; "Holy" – Justin Bieber feat. Chance the Rapper; "Ice Cream" – Blackpink & Selena Gomez; "Life Is Good" – Future feat. Drake; "Rain on Me" – Lady Gaga & Ariana Grande; "Un Día (One Day)" – J Balvin, Dua Lipa, Bad Bunny feat. Tainy; "WAP" – Cardi B feat. Megan Thee Stallion	**"WAP" – Cardi B feat. Megan Thee Stallion**; "Be Kind" – Marshmello & Halsey; "Holy" – Justin Bieber feat. Chance the Rapper; "Life Is Good" – Future feat. Drake; "Rain on Me" – Lady Gaga & Ariana Grande; "Rockstar" – DaBaby feat. Roddy Ricch; "Savage (Remix)" – Megan Thee Stallion feat. Beyoncé; "Whats Poppin (Remix)" – Jack Harlow feat. DaBaby, Tory Lanez, & Lil Wayne
The Soundtrack Song of 2020
**"Only the Young" – Taylor Swift (from Miss Americana)**; "About Love" – Marina (from To All the Boys: P.S. I Still Love You); "Alexander Hamilton" – Leslie Odom Jr. (from Hamilton); "Boss Bitch" – Doja Cat (from Birds of Prey); "Loyal Brave True" – Christina Aguilera (from Mulan); "On Me" – Thomas Rhett, Kane Brown, feat. Ava Max (from Scoob!); "The Other Side" – SZA & Justin Timberlake (from Trolls World Tour); "Rare" – Selena Gomez (from Normal People)

=== Pop culture ===
The Social Star of 2020	The Beauty Influencer of 2020
**Emma Chamberlain**; Charli D'Amelio; Dixie D'Amelio; David Dobrik; Loren Gray; Liza Koshy; Addison Rae; Jojo Siwa	**James Charles**; Jackie Aina; Nikita Dragun; Antonio Garza; NikkieTutorials; Desi Perkins; RCL Beauty; Bretman Rock
The Social Celebrity of 2020	The Animal Star of 2020
**Ariana Grande**; Justin Bieber; Selena Gomez; LeBron James; Kylie Jenner; Kim Kardashian; Lady Gaga; Britney Spears	**Doug the Pug**; Esther the Wonder Pig; Hosico; Jiff Pom; Juniper the Fox; Nala Cat; Shinjiro Ono; Suki Cat
The Comedy Act of 2020	The Style Star of 2020
**Leslie Jones – Leslie Jones: Time Machine**; Dave Chappelle – 8:46; Pete Davidson – Pete Davidson: Alive From NY; Hannah Gadsby – Hannah Gadsby: Douglas; Jim Gaffigan – The Pale Tourist; Jo Koy – Jo Koy: In His Elements; George Lopez – George Lopez: We'll Do It for Half; Jerry Seinfeld – Jerry Seinfeld: 23 Hours to Kill	**Zendaya**; Timothée Chalamet; Kendall Jenner; Kim Kardashian; Lady Gaga; Lil Nas X; Janelle Monáe; Rihanna
The Game Changer of 2020	The Pop Podcast of 2020
**LeBron James**; Simone Biles; Sabrina Ionescu; Michael Jordan; Naomi Osaka; Bubba Wallace; Serena Williams; Russell Wilson	**Anything Goes with Emma Chamberlain**; Armchair Expert with Dax Shepard; Call Her Daddy; Getting Curious with Jonathan Van Ness; I Weigh with Jameela Jamil; Scrubbing In with Becca Tilley & Tanya Rad; Staying In with Emily & Kumail; The Viall Files
The Brazilian Influencer of 2020	The Latin Influencer of 2020
**Manu Gavassi**; Bianca Andrade; Alexandra Gurgel; Foquinha; Rafa Kalimann; Matheus Mazzafera; Valentina Sampaio; Maisa Silva	**Gaby Asturias**; Daniella Álvarez; Nath Campos; José Eduardo Derbez; Jacky Guzmán; Juan Pablo Jaramillo; Sofía Morandi; Belén Soto

=== Other ===
==== People's Icon of 2020 ====
- Jennifer Lopez

==== People's Champion of 2020 ====
- Tyler Perry

==== Fashion Icon of 2020 ====
- Tracee Ellis Ross
