= Amanda Lee (pilot) =

U.S. Navy pilot (born c. 1986)

Lieutenant Commander Amanda Lee
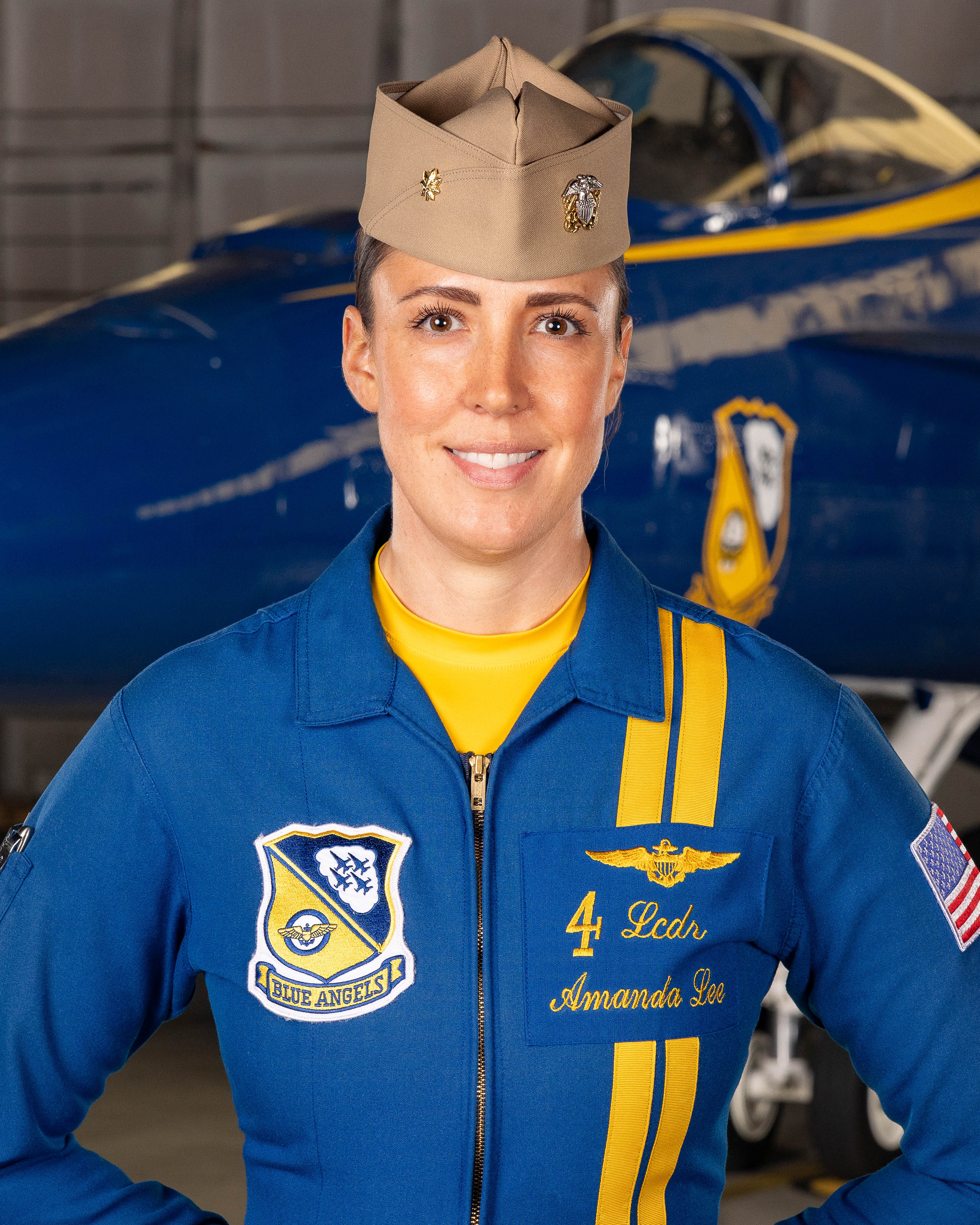
- Born: c. 1986 (age 39–40); Mounds View, Minnesota, US
- Education: Old Dominion University
- Military career
- Branch: United States Navy
- Service years: 2007–present
- Rank: Lieutenant Commander
- Nickname: "Stalin"
- Unit: Strike Fighter Squadron (VFA) 106
- Known for: Blue Angels demonstration pilot
- Conflicts: Operation Inherent Resolve
- Awards: Four Navy Achievement Medals

Amanda Lee (born c. 1986) is a naval aviator in the United States Navy. She was selected in June 2022 as the first female fighter jet pilot in the elite Blue Angels flight demonstration squadron. Lee made her debut as the Left Wing demo pilot in the number three jet on March 11, 2023, at NAF El Centro, California, and she then served as the Slot Pilot in the number four jet. She uses the call sign "Stalin".

== Early life ==
Lee is from Mounds View, Minnesota, and in 2004 graduated from Irondale High School in Minnesota. She competed in many sports while in high school: ice hockey, soccer, and swimming. She attended the University of Minnesota Duluth and enlisted in the United States Navy. In 2007 she graduated from Recruit Training Command, Great Lakes, Illinois. In 2013 she graduated from Old Dominion University with a B.S. in biochemistry.

== Career ==
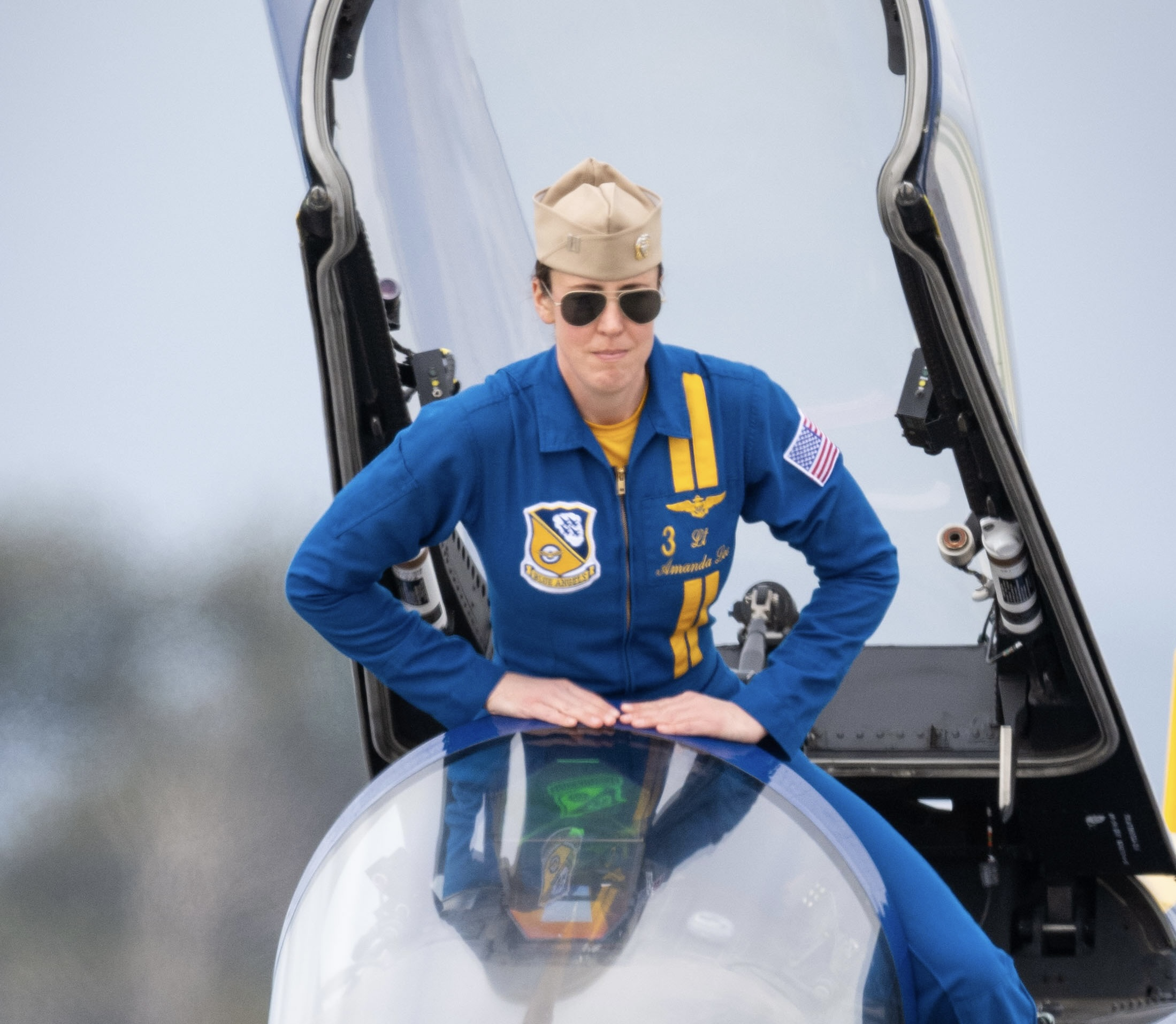
Lee on practice day at Naval Air Station Point Mugu on March 16, 2023

After enlisting in the U.S. Navy, Lee served as an aviation electronics technician. In 2013, she became a commissioned officer and started training as a naval pilot at Naval Air Station Pensacola in Florida. In 2016 she became a naval aviator. She was then assigned to the aircraft carrier USS Harry S. Truman to support Operation Inherent Resolve. As part of her training she successfully completed 225 carrier-arrested landings and 1,400 flight hours. She has four Navy Achievement Medals and other personal and unit awards.

=== Blue Angels ===
In July 2022, Lieutenant Lee was announced as the first woman to join the Blue Angels as a demonstration pilot, and as the second woman in the team, after USMC Captain Katie Higgins Cook who joined in 2015, flying the Lockheed C-130 Hercules Fat Albert transport plane.

In September 2022 she was assigned to the "Gladiators" of Strike Fighter Squadron 106 (VFA-106), based at Naval Air Station Oceana in Virginia. She flies the F/A-18E and the F/A-18F Super Hornet. Her induction and training as a new Blue Angels pilot was captured in the 2024 film The Blue Angels.

Lee's first performance as the Left Wing demo pilot with the Blue Angels took place on March 11, 2023, in El Centro, California. She also performed before an estimated 100,000 people at the MCAS Beaufort Airshow on May 22 and 23, 2023. She was cheered at the show on both days as she climbed into the cockpit of her number three aircraft.

Lieutenant Commander Lee was the slot pilot in the Blue Angels #4 jet, during the 2024 season. Her tour with the Blue Angels lasted two years through the end of the 2024 season. She returned to the fleet in late 2024 to serve as a department head at VFA-87, where she was working on the squadron's 2025 deployment aboard the Navy's newest aircraft carrier, the USS Gerald R. Ford.

== Gallery ==
Amanda Lee and the Blue Angels in formation over Lake Michigan July 23, 2023

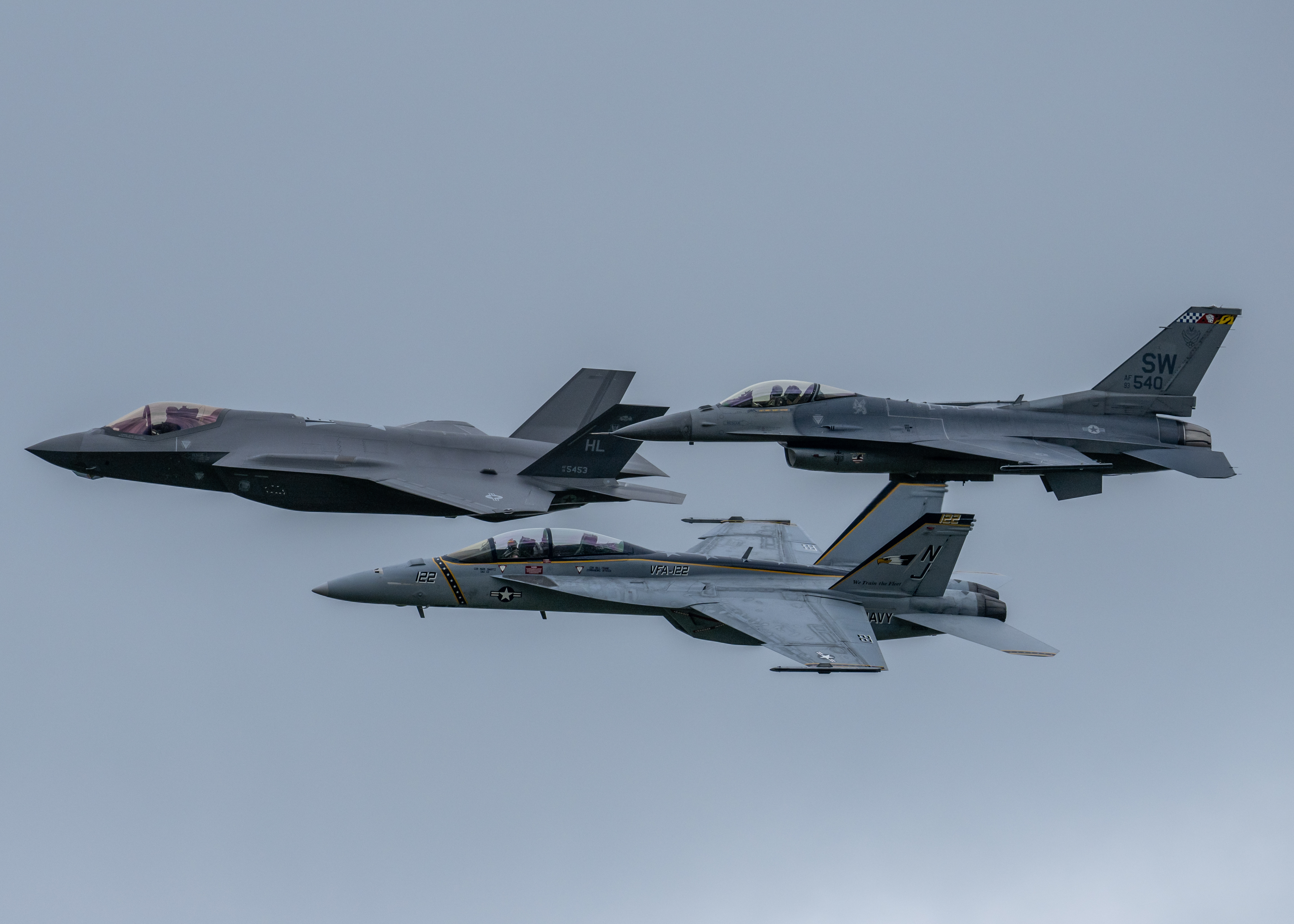
Amanda "Stalin" Lee flies in formation 2022

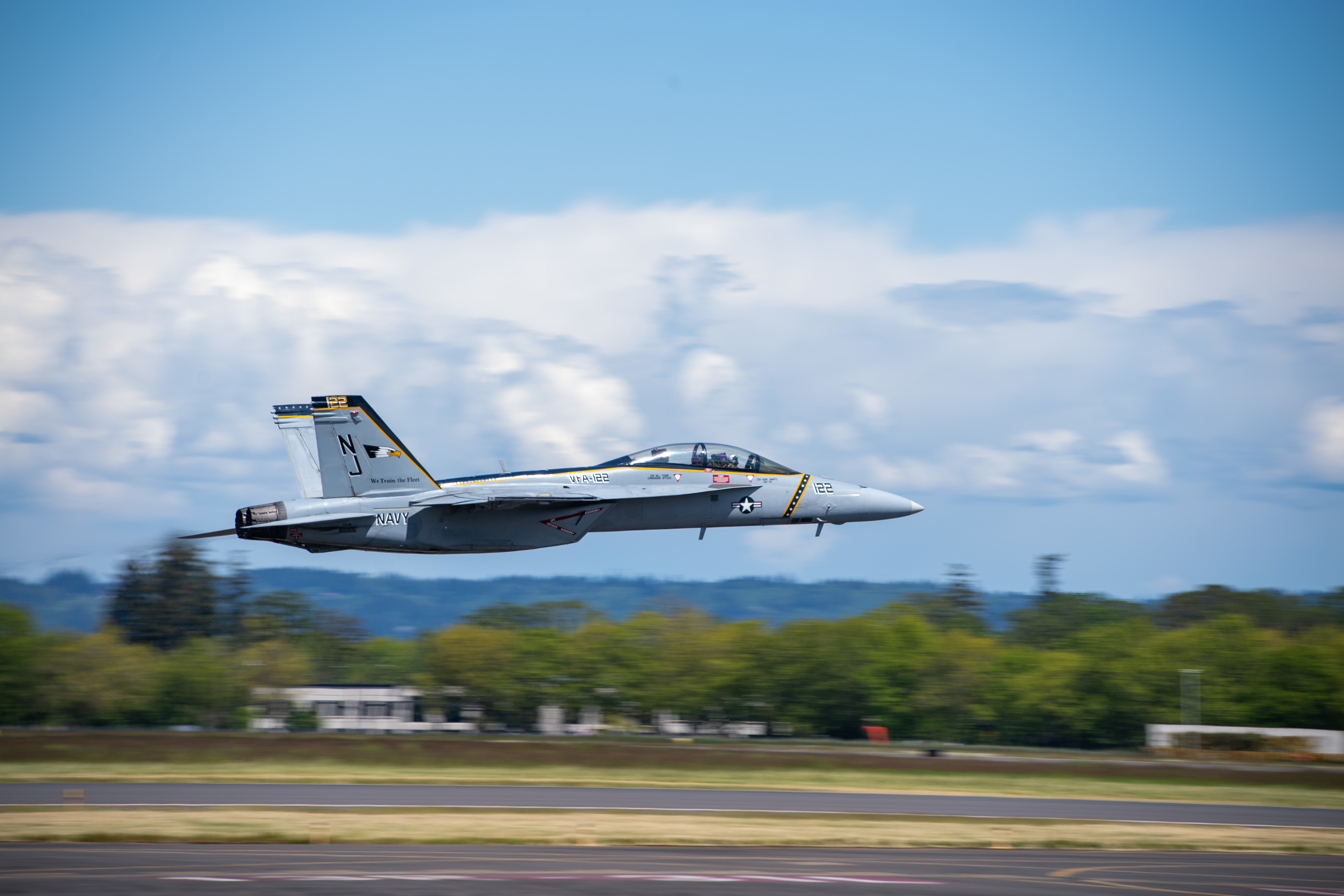
Lt. Amanda Lee performing on the Rhino Demo Team 2022

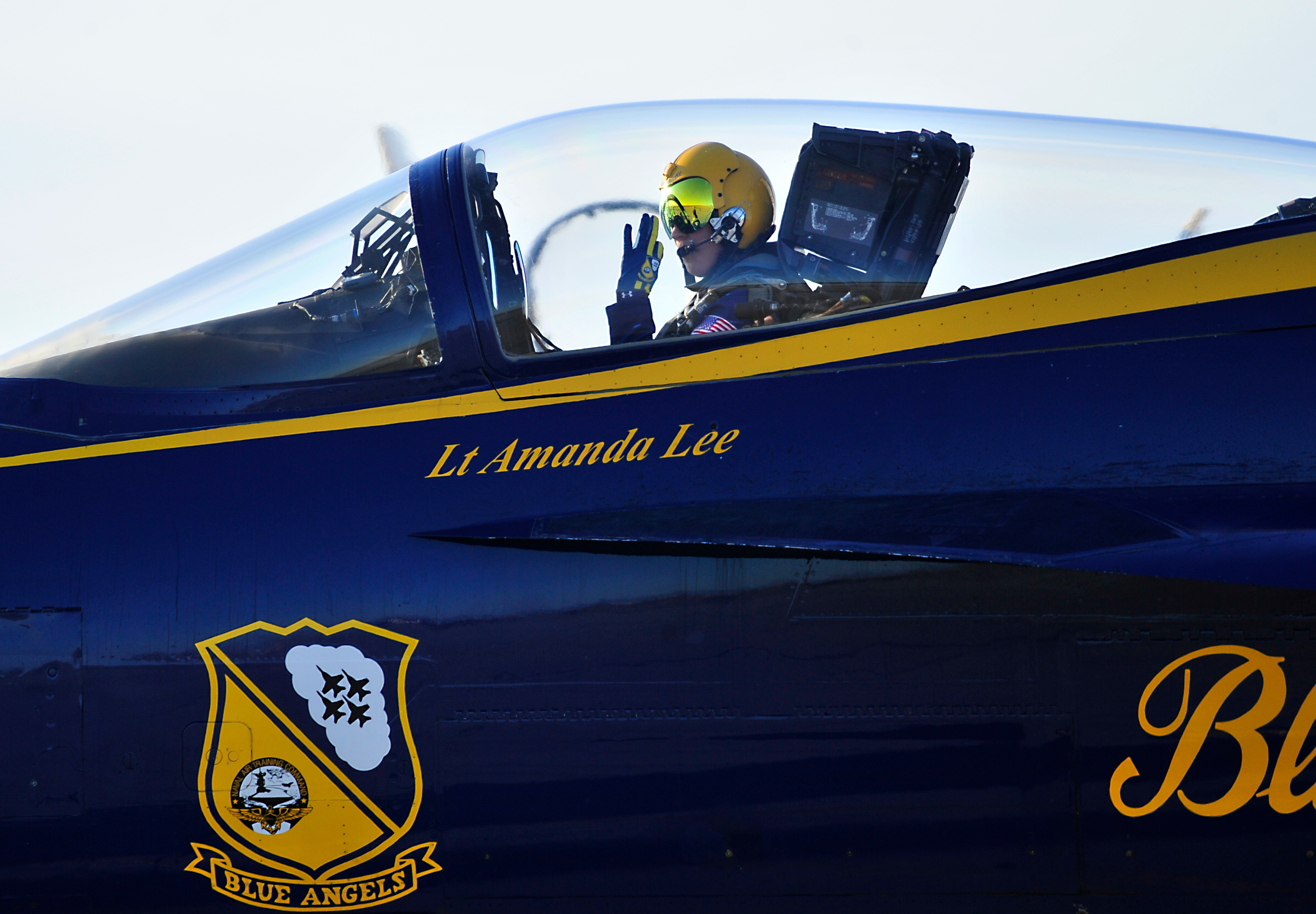
Amanda Lee waves from the cockpit of her Super Hornet 2023

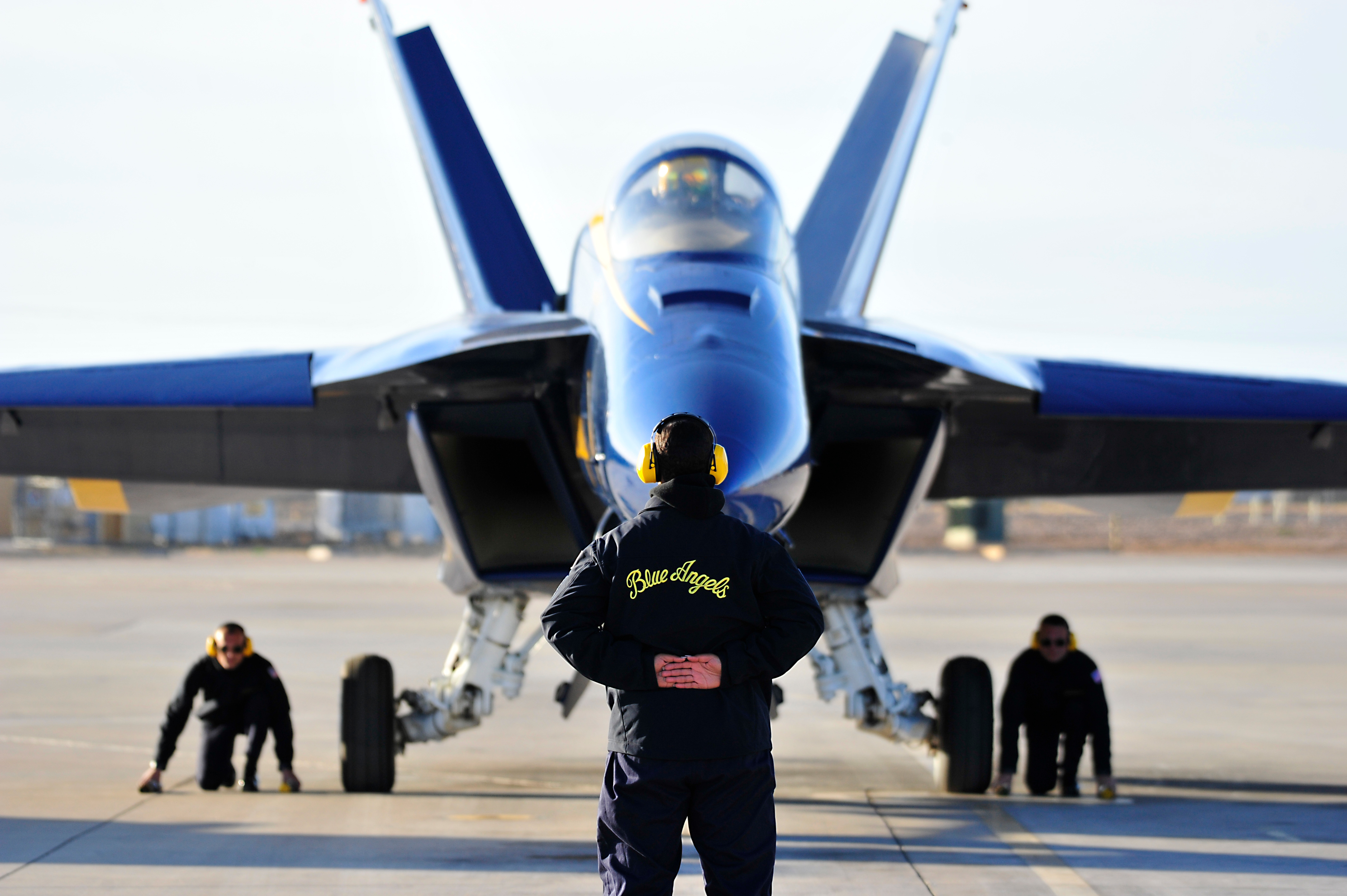
Amanda Lee ready for takeoff 2023

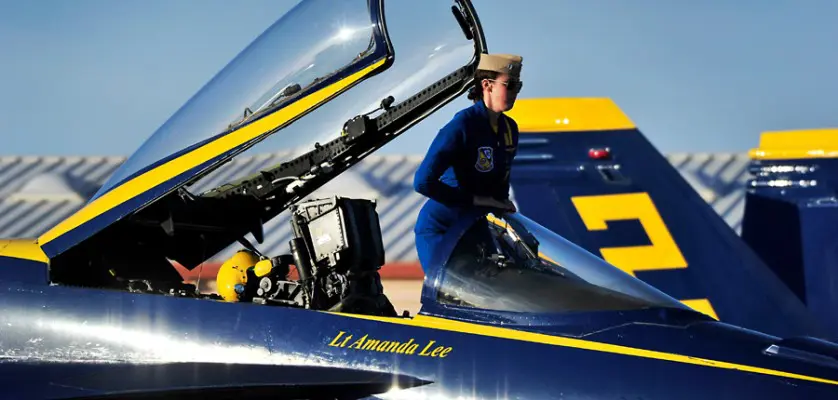
Lt. Amanda Lee prepares for takeoff prior to a training flight over Naval Air Facility (NAF) El Centro (March 2023)
