= Jessica Giles =

Editor-in-chief of Cosmopolitan magazine

Jessica Giles (formerly Pels)
- Born: September 6, 1986 (age 39); Atlanta, Georgia, U.S.
- Occupation: Editor-in-chief of Cosmopolitan magazine

Jessica Giles (formerly Pels) (born September 6, 1986) is the former editor-in-chief of Cosmopolitan magazine. She served as digital director for marieclaire.com from 2014 until 2018, when she became digital director and later that year the chief editor of Cosmopolitan.

== Early life and background ==
Giles grew up in Atlanta, Georgia, United States. She first moved to New York City at the age of 14 to study ballet at the American Ballet Theatre. Giles earned a Bachelor of Fine Arts degree in film production at the New York University Tisch School of the Arts.

== Career ==
=== Early editing career ===
After graduating, Giles interned at The New Yorker and then Vogue. She later began working as an editorial assistant at Condé Nast. Giles served as the assistant to Glamour editor-in-chief Cindi Leive before being promoted to assistant editor a year later, and then associate editor at Glamour. She became the print features editor at Teen Vogue in March 2013. In November 2014, Giles joined Hearst Magazines as digital director at Marie Claire, where she served for three years. At Marie Claire she spearheaded features on a wide range of women's topics from profiles of the women who guard our nuclear weapons, to an essay on feminism from Canadian Prime Minister Justin Trudeau.

=== Cosmopolitan ===
In January 2018, Giles was appointed digital director of Cosmopolitan magazine. By the end of May she had revamped the magazine's digital presence. Cosmopolitan saw an increase in traffic from 15 million visitors a year in February 2018 to 41 million visitors a year later, and digital subscriptions grew 185% from 85,060 to 242,075 between December 2016 and December 2018. In October 2018, Giles was named editor-in-chief of Cosmopolitan. As editor-in-chief, Giles oversaw the print magazine, website, video, social, Snapchat and product extensions of the brand. In 2019, Giles was named Adweek's Editor of the Year.

In August 2024, Giles stepped down from the role and was succeeded by Willa Bennett.
