= The Bachelor (American TV series) season 24 =

Season of television series

The Bachelor
- Season 24
- Promotional poster
- Starring: Peter Weber
- Presented by: Chris Harrison
- No. of contestants: 30
- Winner: Hannah Ann Sluss
- Runner-up: Madison Prewett
- No. of episodes: 12

Release
- Original network: ABC
- Original release: January 6 – March 10, 2020

Additional information
- Filming dates: September 20 – November 17, 2019

Season chronology
- ← Previous; Season 23 Next → Season 25

The twenty-fourth season of The Bachelor premiered on January 6, 2020. This season features 28-year-old Peter Weber, a Delta Air Lines pilot from Westlake Village, California.

Weber finished in third place on the fifteenth season of The Bachelorette featuring Hannah Brown.

The season ended on March 10, 2020, with Weber choosing to propose to 23-year-old model Hannah Ann Sluss. However, during the live After the Final Rose special, it was revealed that Weber and Sluss had ended their engagement in January 2020. Although Weber and runner-up Madison Prewett admitted to still having feelings for each other, they ultimately decided not to pursue a relationship. On May 2, 2020, Weber revealed that he was dating fifth-placed Kelley Flanagan. Weber and Flanagan announced their breakup on December 31, 2020. They got back together in August 2022, but broke up again in April 2023.

== Production ==
=== Casting and contestants ===
On September 17, 2019, during the reunion episode of season six of Bachelor in Paradise, Weber was announced as the next Bachelor by host Chris Harrison, over castmates Tyler Cameron and Mike Johnson.

Notable contestants include Alayah Benavidez and Victoria Paul, who competed together at Miss USA 2019 who were Miss Texas USA 2019 and Miss Louisiana USA 2019 respectively, the latter who finished in the top 15, Benavidez was also previously crowned Miss United States 2016; Miss Iowa USA 2017 and Miss USA 2017 competitor Kelsey Weier; and Miss Montana Teen USA 2013 and Miss Teen USA 2013 competitor Maurissa Gunn. It also includes Madison Prewett, the daughter of Auburn Tigers men's basketball assistant coach and director of operations Chad Prewett.

=== Filming and development ===
On September 25, 2019, it was reported that the season would film in Cleveland, Ohio and Costa Rica. Weber suffered a minor facial injury while filming in Costa Rica. In addition to those locations, the season also included visits to Chile, Peru, and Australia.

Previous Bachelorette Hannah Brown, former contestant Demi Burnett, country music artists Tenille Arts, Chase Rice, and Hunter Hayes, television personalities Carson Kressley and Janice Dickinson, comedian Fred Willard, retired NFL players Josh Cribbs and Hanford Dixon, and Auburn Tigers coach Bruce Pearl made guest appearances this season.

== Contestants ==
On September 17, 2019, 33 potential contestants were revealed on The Bachelor's social media pages.

The final cast of 30 women was announced on December 16, 2019.

Name	Age	Hometown	Occupation	Outcome	Place	Ref
Hannah Ann Sluss	23	Powell, Tennessee	Model	Winner	1	
Madison Prewett	23	Auburn, Alabama	Foster Parent Recruiter	Runner-up	2 (quit)	
Victoria Fuller	26	Virginia Beach, Virginia	Medical Sales Rep	Week 9	3	
Kelsey Weier	28	Urbandale, Iowa	Professional Clothier	Week 8	4	
Kelley Flanagan	27	North Barrington, Illinois	Attorney	Week 7	5	
Natasha Parker	31	Manhattan, New York	Event Planner	Week 7	6	
Mykenna Dorn	22	Langley, British Columbia	Fashion Blogger	Week 6	7–8	
Sydney Hightower	24	Northport, Alabama	Retail Marketing Manager	Week 6	7–8	
Tammy Ly	24	Syracuse, New York	House Flipper	Week 6	9	
Victoria Paul	27	Alexandria, Louisiana	Nurse	Week 6	10	
Lexi Buchanan	26	Jacksonville, Florida	Marketing Coordinator	Week 5	11–12	
Shiann Lewis	27	Las Vegas, Nevada	Administrative Assistant	Week 5	11–12	
Deandra Kanu	23	Bar Harbor, Maine	Home Care Coordinator	Week 4	13–15	
Kiarra Norman	23	Kennesaw, Georgia	Nanny	Week 4	13–15	
Savannah Mullins	27	Houston, Texas	Realtor	Week 4	13–15	
Alayah Benavidez	24	Helotes, Texas	Orthodontist Assistant	Week 4	16	
Alayah Benavidez	(Returned to competition)			Week 3		
Alexa Caves	27	Springfield, Illinois	Esthetician	Week 3	17–19	
Jasmine Nguyen	25	Houston, Texas	Client Relations Manager	Week 3	17–19	
Sarah Coffin	24	Knoxville, Tennessee	Medical Radiographer	Week 3	17–19	
Courtney Perry	26	Venice, Florida	Cosmetologist	Week 2	20–22	
Lauren Jones	26	Glendale, California	Marketing Executive	Week 2	20–22	
Payton Moran	24	Wellesley, Massachusetts	Business Development Rep	Week 2	20–22	
Avonlea Elkins	27	Fort Worth, Texas	Cattle Rancher	Week 1	23–30	
Eunice Cho	23	Chicago, Illinois	Flight Attendant	Week 1	23–30	
Jade Gilliland	26	Mesa, Arizona	Media Buyer	Week 1	23–30	
Jenna Serrano	22	New Lenox, Illinois	Nursing Student	Week 1	23–30	
Katrina Badowski	28	St. Charles, Illinois	Pro NBA Dancer	Week 1	23–30	
Kylie Ramos	26	Davis, California	Entertainment Sales Associate	Week 1	23–30	
Maurissa Gunn	23	Laurel, Montana	Patient Care Coordinator	Week 1	23–30	
Megan Hops	26	San Bruno, California	Flight Attendant	Week 1	23–30	

=== Future appearances ===
==== Bachelor in Paradise ====
Season 7

Alayah Benavidez, Deandra Kanu, Kelsey Weier, Maurissa Gunn, Mykenna Dorn, Natasha Parker, Tammy Ly and Victoria Paul returned for season 7 of Bachelor in Paradise. Victoria P. quit the show in week 1. Kelsey was eliminated in week 1. Alayah, Deandra and Tammy were eliminated in week 3. Natasha was eliminated in week 5. Mykenna split from Ed Waisbrot in week 6. Maurissa got engaged to Riley Christian in week 6.

Season 8

Victoria Fuller returned for season 8 of Bachelor in Paradise. She got engaged to Johnny DePhillipo in week 6.

==== The Traitors ====
Season 2

Peter Weber participated in season 2 of The Traitors.

==== Destination X ====
Peter competed in season 1 of Destination X.

== Call-out order ==
Order	Bachelorettes	Week									
Order	Bachelorettes	1	2	3	4	5	6	7	8	9	10
1	Alayah	Hannah Ann	Kelley	Victoria F.	Victoria F.	Sydney	Hannah Ann	Madison	Hannah Ann	Hannah Ann	Hannah Ann
2	Sydney	Victoria P.	Madison	Victoria P.	Kelsey	Hannah Ann	Madison	Kelsey	Madison	Madison	Madison
3	Hannah Ann	Madison	Sydney	Sydney	Madison	Kelley	Victoria F.	Victoria F.	Victoria F. (Note: Peter and Victoria F. originally broke up during her hometown date. However, the next day he told her he would make his final decision at the rose ceremony, where she received a rose.)	Victoria F.	
4	Sarah	Kelley	Mykenna	Kelsey	Sydney	Kelsey	Kelsey	Hannah Ann	Kelsey		
5	Lauren	Lexi	Victoria P.	Hannah Ann	Natasha	Victoria F.	Natasha	Kelley			
6	Victoria P.	Savannah	Natasha	Natasha	Lexi	Madison	Kelley	Natasha			
7	Mykenna	Lauren	Jasmine	Lexi	Hannah Ann	Natasha	Mykenna; Sydney				
8	Maurissa	Tammy	Sarah	Madison	Shiann	Victoria P.	Mykenna; Sydney				
9	Kelsey	Alayah	Lexi	Shiann	Mykenna	Mykenna	Tammy				
10	Eunice	Jasmine	Hannah Ann	Kelley	Victoria P.	Tammy	Victoria P.				
11	Jade	Sydney	Alexa	Kiarra	Kelley	Lexi; Shiann					
12	Megan	Natasha	Tammy	Tammy	Tammy	Lexi; Shiann					
13	Madison	Mykenna	Alayah	Savannah	Deandra; Kiarra; Savannah						
14	Tammy	Deandra	Deandra	Deandra	Deandra; Kiarra; Savannah						
15	Shiann	Sarah	Victoria F.	Mykenna	Deandra; Kiarra; Savannah						
16	Courtney	Alexa	Shiann	Alayah; Alexa; Jasmine; Sarah	Alayah (Note: Alayah returned to the competition in week four and received the group date rose, but was eliminated again before the rose ceremony.)						
17	Kiarra	Kelsey	Kiarra	Alayah; Alexa; Jasmine; Sarah							
18	Lexi	Payton	Savannah	Alayah; Alexa; Jasmine; Sarah							
19	Deandra	Kiarra	Kelsey	Alayah; Alexa; Jasmine; Sarah							
20	Payton	Courtney	Courtney; Lauren; Payton								
21	Jasmine	Shiann	Courtney; Lauren; Payton								
22	Kylie	Victoria F.	Courtney; Lauren; Payton								
23	Katrina	Avonlea; Eunice; Jade; Jenna; Katrina; Kylie; Maurissa; Megan									
24	Victoria F.	Avonlea; Eunice; Jade; Jenna; Katrina; Kylie; Maurissa; Megan									
25	Jenna	Avonlea; Eunice; Jade; Jenna; Katrina; Kylie; Maurissa; Megan									
26	Savannah	Avonlea; Eunice; Jade; Jenna; Katrina; Kylie; Maurissa; Megan									
27	Kelley	Avonlea; Eunice; Jade; Jenna; Katrina; Kylie; Maurissa; Megan									
28	Alexa	Avonlea; Eunice; Jade; Jenna; Katrina; Kylie; Maurissa; Megan									
29	Avonlea	Avonlea; Eunice; Jade; Jenna; Katrina; Kylie; Maurissa; Megan									
30	Natasha	Avonlea; Eunice; Jade; Jenna; Katrina; Kylie; Maurissa; Megan									

The contestant received the first impression rose
The contestant received a rose during the date
The contestant received a rose outside of a rose ceremony or date
The contestant was eliminated
The contestant was eliminated during the date
The contestant received a rose during the date but was eliminated
The contestant quit the competition
The contestant won the competition

== Episodes ==
No. overall	No. in season	Title	Original release date	Prod. code	U.S. viewers (millions)	Rating/share (18–49)
240	1	"Week 1: Season Premiere"	January 6, 2020	2401	6.07	1.9/9
The season begins with Peter getting ready in his hometown of Westlake Village, California before arriving at the mansion to meet the women. Memorable entrances include Alayah giving Peter a letter from her grandmother, Eunice entering with wings attached to the back of her dress, Madison arriving in a huge paper airplane, Lexi driving a classic 1962 Chevrolet Corvette (C1), Jasmine speaking Vietnamese language to Peter, Jenna presenting her "emotional support cow" named Ashley P., Savannah blindfolding Peter and sharing the first kiss with him, and Kelley admitting that she met Peter at a hotel prior to filming. Hannah Brown appears to return the pilot wings that he had given her on the first night of The Bachelorette 15, her season. After giving a toast to all of the women, Peter and Alayah read the letter that her grandmother wrote, Sydney plays mini-golf with him, Hannah Ann shows him a painting of her hometown overlooking the Great Smoky Mountains, and Mykenna tells him about her grandparents' 60+ year marriage. Peter kisses multiple women; including Hannah Ann, Tammy and Mykenna. Hannah Ann receives the first impression rose. Avonlea, Eunice, Jade, Jenna, Katrina, Kylie, Maurissa and Megan are eliminated. The first group date consists of Hannah Ann, Kelley, Deandra, Tammy, Victoria P., Courtney, Shiann, Jasmine and Victoria F. at the Sun Air Jet Hangar in Camarillo Airport. United States Marine Corps pilots Katie Higgins Cook and Alisa Johnson host a lesson for them. The women compete in an obstacle course; the final round comes down to Tammy and Kelley. Kelley ends up winning a sunset flight with Peter after cheating in the final round, upsetting Tammy. The dinner portion is held at the Four Seasons Hotel, where Peter and Kelley first met prior to filming. Peter gives the group date rose to Kelley. This upsets the other women, who believe she had an unfair advantage. Madison receives the first one-on-one date of this season, where she and Peter drive to his parents' house for their 31st wedding anniversary. Madison gets to meet Peter's family members and friends at the house. His parents renew their vows, with Peter as the ordained minister. During the night portion, Madison opens up about her family and receives the rose. Afterwards, Peter surprises her with a private Tenille Arts concert. The second group date for the week consists of Lauren, Sydney, Payton, Kelsey, Natasha, Alexa, Mykenna, Alayah and Savannah at the Avalon Hollywood. The women are dismayed to see Hannah Brown hosting the group date, which is supposed to be each woman telling a sex story to an audience. Hannah admits to Peter backstage that she was struggling seeing him as the Bachelor and was questioning whether she should've chosen him during her own season. Peter asks if she would consider joining the house. The episode ends with a cliffhanger.
241	2	"Week 2"	January 13, 2020	2402	5.37	1.6/7
Continuing from the previous episode, Peter and Hannah Brown continue their discussion about their relationship; ultimately, they decide that it would be best to part ways. Peter tells the women that the daytime portion is canceled and that they were going straight to the night portion. The women are frustrated at the amount of time that Peter had spent with Hannah, and he spends the night apologizing. Sydney ends up receiving the group date rose. At the cocktail party, Kelsey is excited to share an expensive bottle of Dom Pérignon with Peter. She brought the bottle from home, receiving it as a birthday present. However, Hannah Ann unknowingly opens the bottle of champagne with Peter, which causes a fight between the two women. At the rose ceremony, an emotional Kelsey receives the last rose. Courtney, Lauren and Payton are eliminated. Alexa, Mykenna, Natasha, Deandra, Lexi, Victoria F., Kelsey and Hannah Ann are selected on this group date at Melrose Avenue for a Revolve fashion show in front of an audience, which is judged by Peter, Carson Kressley, Janice Dickinson and Revolve's chief brand officer Raissa Gerona. Hannah Ann, who is a model, wins the fashion show and a brand new wardrobe, courtesy of Revolve. At the night portion of the date, Victoria F. is upset, as she is out of her comfort zone and feels like Peter didn’t notice her. Peter reassures her that he likes her and wants her to be there. Hannah Ann tells Peter that she feels bullied by Kelsey after "champagne-gate". Peter gives the group date rose to Victoria F., and the episode ends on a cliffhanger as he pulls Kelsey aside to question her about Hannah Ann's accusations.
242	3	"Week 3"	January 20, 2020	2403	6.26	1.9/8
Continuing from the previous episode with "champagne-gate," Hannah Ann and Kelsey sit down to talk, but make no headway in their argument. Victoria P. receives the one-on-one date, and Peter takes her line dancing. During the night portion, Victoria P. opens up about her difficult childhood with her father passing away, her mother struggling with drug addiction, and living in homeless shelters. Victoria P. receives the rose. Alayah shows her "wild side" at the mansion which rubs the other girls the wrong way. Kiarra, Sarah, Tammy, Kelley, Shiann, Savannah, Sydney and Alayah go on the second group date of the week, hosted by Demi Burnett from the previous season. Demi assigns outfits to all of the women, varying from lingerie to muumuus. The women arrive at a saloon, where they participate in "Demi's Extreme Pillow Fight Club." Chris Harrison announced, alongside recurring guest announcer Fred Willard. Alayah is crowned champion, to the dismay of the other women. The night portion commences, and Alayah reveals her abandonment issues to Peter, who is pleased to see her open up. Sydney questions Alayah's authenticity, and expresses those concerns to Peter. Though Alayah tries to defend herself, Peter decides to give Sydney the group date rose for being honest with him and putting him first. The following day, the cocktail party is canceled and replaced by a pool party. Sydney gives Peter the choice of whom to believe, but multiple other women express to Peter that they think Alayah is fake, “turning it on” for the cameras, and isn’t there for him. Victoria P. tells Peter that Alayah asked her to lie to the producers about them knowing each other, as they competed together in Miss USA 2019. She claims that they weren't friends and only spent three hours together in total during their time in Miss USA. Peter confronts Alayah about this, and she justifies it as not wanting them to be disqualified for knowing each other, and that she is there for him. Peter refutes the point by saying that her intentions are not genuine. He abruptly leaves, effectively ending the pool party. At the rose ceremony, Peter decides to remove one rose and send an extra person home, meaning Alayah, Alexa, Jasmine and Sarah were eliminated.
243	4	"Week 4: Cleveland, Ohio"	January 27, 2020	2404	5.99	1.6/8
Chris Harrison drops by the mansion and reveals that the women will be meeting Peter in Cleveland, Ohio. Victoria F. gets the first one-on-one date. Peter flies them to Cedar Point in a private plane and reveals the entire amusement park has been closed just for them. Afterwards, Peter reveals he has another surprise for her and takes her to a Chase Rice concert. Victoria F. is shocked and uncomfortable as she previously dated Chase Rice before coming on the show. In the night portion of the date, Victoria F. reveals to Peter that she has a past with Chase but reassures him that she no longer has feelings for him and is there for Peter. Victoria F. receives the rose. The group date takes place at FirstEnergy Stadium with 13 women. They meet with former Cleveland Browns players Josh Cribbs and Hanford Dixon and discover that they will be playing against each other in a football game, with the winning team going to the night portion with Peter and the losing team going back to the hotel. Victoria P. sits out of the game due to a back injury. The game ends in a tie, with all 13 women heading to the night portion. Alayah, who was eliminated at the last rose ceremony, returns to everybody's shock and dismay. She tells Peter that the women were lying about her and that she and Victoria P. were friends in Miss USA and even went on a trip to Las Vegas together. Peter begins to question Victoria P.'s honesty and ultimately decides to invite Alayah back and gives her the group date rose. Kelsey gets the second one-on-one date where they explore sights around Cleveland, like dancing with musicians, eating pierogis and soap box racing in the streets. During the night portion at Nautica Queen Cruise Ship on Cuyahoga River, Kelsey opens up to Peter about her parents' divorce and how she didn't see her father for 12 years after he left. Peter gives Kelsey the rose and they enjoy a fireworks show. At the hotel, Victoria F. discovers that Alayah found out about her dating Chase Rice while she was at home and had internet access, and told all the women when she returned. Victoria F. confronts Alayah and says she'll tell Peter that Alayah is manipulative and a pot-stirrer. At the cocktail party, multiple women call Peter out for not appreciating them and giving Alayah the rose when she wasn't on the group date. Peter begins to question if some of the women will leave. Despite the women's frustration at how much time he has spent on the Alayah drama, Peter pulls Victoria P., Alayah, and Victoria F. aside to talk about it further. The episode ends in a cliffhanger with Peter, hearing all the women arguing with Alayah from another room, not knowing what decision to make.
244	5	"Week 5: Costa Rica"	February 3, 2020	2405	5.62	1.5/8
Continuing from the previous episode, the group of women are arguing with Alayah and questioning her intentions. Peter pulls Alayah aside and decides to send her home once and for all to end the drama. At the rose ceremony, Deandra, Kiarra, and Savannah are eliminated. Peter announces that the remaining 12 women are heading to Costa Rica. In the town of Arenal, Peter arrives at the hotel to explain to the women that he has a bandage on his forehead after running into a golf cart with a glass in his hand, subsequently getting twenty-two stitches. Sydney receives the first one-on-one date. They leave in a helicopter through the Costa Rican jungle, viewing waterfalls and the overlooking volcano. They arrive on a hillside, bonding over Spanish as Peter is part Cuban and Sydney is part Dominican; Peter reveals that Sydney is the best kisser. During the night portion, Sydney opens up about her estranged relationship with her father and her struggles with being bullied in high school for being a mixed-race girl in Alabama. Sydney receives the rose and they go swimming in the hot springs. The group date consists of Shiann, Kelsey, Victoria F., Madison, Natasha, Victoria P., Lexi, Hannah Ann, Tammy, and Mykenna. The girls arrive at the La Fortuna waterfall. Jessica Pels, along with photographer Tyler Joe, reveal the group date is a photoshoot for Cosmopolitan. Victoria F. wins the photoshoot, and the prize is getting to be on the cover of the March edition of Cosmopolitan with Peter. During the night portion, Victoria F. celebrates her 26th birthday two days late with Peter. Kelsey reveals to Peter that she is falling in love with him. Tammy decides to tell Peter that Kelsey had a mental breakdown after Sydney received the first 1-on-1 and has been drinking excessively. Peter confronts Kelsey about this, telling her that it will not get easier. Kelsey adamantly tells Peter that she can handle it, and confronts the rest of the women about who called her emotionally unstable. Nobody admits to being the one who told Peter. Hannah Ann gets the group date rose. Kelley gets the second one-on-one date. They attend a shaman healing ritual. During the night portion, Kelley confronts Peter about his decisions to reward the drama. Peter promises Kelley that she is not wasting her time and gives her the rose. The next day, Kelsey figures out that Tammy has been the one talking about her to Peter. She sneaks out to the villa where Peter is staying and tells him that Tammy is starting rumors that she is an alcoholic and a "pill popper", and that she wants to tell him it's false before it gets back to him. Peter promises her that he believes her and says that Tammy is just jealous of their connection, and rewards Kelsey with a rose. Later that night, Chris Harrison tells the women the cocktail party is canceled as Peter has already made his mind up. Before the rose ceremony, both Tammy and Mykenna interrupt Peter to have one last conversation before he hands the roses out. In the end, Tammy receives the last rose, and Shiann and Lexi are eliminated.
245	6	"Week 6: Chile"	February 5, 2020	2406	5.10	1.3/6
The 10 remaining ladies arrive in Santiago, Chile. Hannah Ann receives the first one-on-one date, and they explore the city of Santiago. In the night portion, Peter questions if Hannah Ann is ready to be in love and get married. Hannah Ann tells him that she was in a 3.5 year relationship but was not in love, but promises that she is falling in love with Peter. Hannah Ann receives the rose. At the hotel, Mykenna is questioning whether she should go home after discovering that Victoria F. has received her second one-on-one date while Mykenna, Natasha and Tammy have not had one yet. Eight women are on the group date and head to MEGA studios at the Studio 2 Backlog. Peter reveals that the group date is filming their very own telenovela called El Amor de Pedro. In the night portion of the date, Victoria P. questions where Peter is at in their relationship. Peter tells her that he doesn't see her as his wife, and they both agree it's best that she leaves. The women are shocked to discover that Victoria P. is going home, and Tammy criticises Mykenna for being immature and ungrateful. Madison receives the group date rose. Victoria F. arrives for her one-on-one date at El Peñasco De Santa Sylvia in the countryside where they meet a huaso and ride horses. At the night portion, Peter questions if Victoria F. is ready for marriage. Although Victoria F. storms off and cries in the bathroom because she can't give him the answer that he wants, Peter still gives her the rose. Mykenna and Tammy are shocked when an impromptu 2-on-1 date card arrives for them. Although Tammy tells Peter that Mykenna is immature and is only there to build her brand, Peter believes Mykenna and sends Tammy home. Afterwards, the other women arrive for the cocktail party and Peter decides to eliminate Mykenna and Sydney at the rose ceremony. Afterwards, Peter tells the final 6 women that they will be traveling to Lima, Peru.
246	7	"Week 7: Lima, Peru"	February 10, 2020	2407	6.39	1.8/9
After a discussion with his mom via Skype, Peter visits the women at their hotel in Lima and reminds them that he is there for marriage and doesn't want to be blindsided at the end. Madison receives the first one-on-one date and they travel to Pucusana, where they go fishing. During the night portion, Madison reveals to Peter that she grew up in a very religious household and wants her husband to embody the same qualities. Although Peter admits his faith could be stronger, he tells Madison that he is falling in love with her and gives her the rose. Natasha gets her first one-on-one date where they explore the city of Lima. During the date, Natasha opens up about on her past relationship. At the night portion of the date, Peter admits that their relationship is not at the same level as the others and decides to send Natasha home. Kelsey receives the final one-on-one date of the season. She and Peter travel to the Pachacamac ruins where they ride ATVs. They discuss what type of marriage they want and how they'd like to raise their children. In the night portion, Kelsey tells Peter that her father won't be involved in her hometown date, and that she has recently reconnected with him after being estranged for 12 years. Peter gives Kelsey the rose. The final group date consists of Victoria F., Hannah Ann, and Kelley. Hannah Ann reads a letter she wrote for Peter describing all the reasons she's falling in love with him. Kelley is very confident in her connection with Peter and is certain that she will be getting a rose. Although Victoria F. and Peter have yet another argument about their relationship and if she's ready for marriage, he decides to give her the first rose, securing her a hometown date. Peter decides that his mind is made up and says he doesn't need the night portion of the date, and gives the second rose to Hannah Ann, sending Kelley home and confirming the final 4.
247	8	"Week 8: Hometowns"	February 17, 2020	2408	6.61	1.8/9
The first hometown date is in Knoxville, Tennessee. Hannah Ann takes Peter to the Smoky Mountain Axe House in Alcoa where they practice axe throwing. Peter gives Hannah Ann a letter listing all the things he loves about her, mirroring the letter she wrote him in Peru. Later that night, Peter meets Hannah Ann's family at their home in Powell. Peter tells Hannah Ann that he's falling in love with her despite her father Rick's request for him not to tell her unless he really means it. Hannah Ann then tells Peter that she's in love with him. Next, Peter goes to Des Moines, Iowa and meets Kelsey at the Iowa State Capitol. They travel to Summerset Winery in Indianola where they make their own custom wine. After they taste the wine they created, Kelsey tells Peter she's in love with him. Peter meets Kelsey's family at their home in Urbandale, where he tries crab rangoon for the first time. Kelsey's mother Beth warns Peter not to break her daughter's heart and not to string her along if he knows she's not the one. In Auburn, Alabama, Madison meets up with Peter in the famous Auburn Arena at Auburn University, where Madison attended college and where her father is an assistant coach. Charles Barkley appears in a video on the big screen to give them a message, and Auburn Tigers men's basketball head coach Bruce Pearl runs them through a set of basketball drills. That night, Madison has an eye-opening conversation with her mother Tonya about the differences in her and Peter's faith, and her father Chad questions Peter about their longterm compatibility. Finally, Peter heads to Virginia Beach, Virginia to meet Victoria F., where she introduces him to her dog Buxton. They visit The Shack where Hunter Hayes is performing a concert for them. Afterwards, Peter is confronted by his ex-girlfriend Merissa Pence, who is from Virginia Beach and has mutual friends with Victoria F. She tells him to be careful and that he deserves better than Victoria, and warns him that Victoria has broken up several relationships. Before meeting Victoria's family, Peter pulls her aside to question the allegations. The conversation goes poorly and Peter leaves without meeting her family. The next day, Victoria F. shows up at his hotel room to apologize and tells him that she's falling in love with him. Peter tells her that he won't make his decision about her until the rose ceremony. The rose ceremony takes place at Sun Air Jet Hangar in Camarillo (the same place where it took the first group date earlier in the season). Peter gives roses to Hannah Ann, Madison, and Victoria F., eliminating Kelsey and leaving her heartbroken. Madison, who has been struggling with the thought of the upcoming fantasy suites, pulls Peter aside after the rose ceremony to talk.
248	9	"Week 9: Fantasy Suites"	February 24, 2020	2409	6.82	1.9/9
Continuing from the previous episode, Madison pulls Peter aside after the rose ceremony to talk about the upcoming fantasy suites. She admits that she will have a hard time moving forward in their relationship if he is intimate with anyone else. The overnight dates are taking place in Gold Coast, Australia. The woman arrive at the Intercontinental Sanctuary Cove Hotel in Hope Island one by one and discover that they are living together during this week. Hannah Ann gets the first date, and Peter takes her jet-skiing. Hannah Ann tells him that she will be able to move forward from whatever happens with Peter's other relationships that week. That night, Peter offers her the fantasy suite card, and she accepts. Victoria F. gets the second date, where she and Peter have a helicopter ride into a scenic view of Gold Coast. They land in Lamington National Park where they explore the scenic Morans Falls and have a picnic. That night, Peter asks Victoria to open up about her previous relationship and why she didn't feel good enough. He offers her the fantasy suite card, and she accepts. Madison, who knows that Peter went into the fantasy suite with the other two women, has the final date in Surfers Paradise. Peter takes her to Q1, the tallest residential building in the Southern Hemisphere, and reveals they are going to climb from the penthouse to the top of the building. That night, Peter is anxious to talk to Madison about the fantasy suite dates. She tells him that she is saving herself for marriage and would not accept a proposal if he had slept with the other women. Peter admits that he has been intimate in the fantasy suites, causing Madison to stand up and walk away from the table. Peter follows her out and asks her not to give up on their relationship, and the episode ends on a cliffhanger.
249	10	"The Women Tell All"	March 2, 2020	N/A	6.36	1.8/9
At the start of the special, a clip from the previous episode as the rose ceremony in Australia is happening, Hannah Ann and Victoria F. stand on the podium, while Madison arrives a little late. Peter gives the roses to Hannah Ann and Madison, and eliminating Victoria F. Victoria steps aside to talk with Peter before getting to the limo. Peter and the final two ladies are giving a toast to meet his family. Victoria F. and most of the other eliminated women were in the audience. Several of the contestants spoke of their lives after the competition, Alayah and Sydney are constantly arguing just what on they did in Cleveland, as well as Victoria P. and Savannah, Tammy and Mykenna have continued a huge argument even they are not still friends. Victoria F. tells on her story: she was romantically linked with her friends' husbands as they had an affair, telling her it is a secret. Kelsey opens up about her life since her elimination and is struggling on finding love. Kelsey reveals that her present of Dom Pérignon was originally to be brought in the first night, but didn't work out until the second week. Ashley Iaconetti Haibon comes onto the stage and gives Kelsey a present of huge champagne bottle. Before Peter appears at the stage, Peter prepares to meet the women since he had been eliminated them, Chris, Peter and his parents sneaking into the Southern California neighborhood for a Bachelor premiere night viewing party. Once Peter tries to find his parents as they have found out inside the private SUV. When Peter is on the stage, he acknowledges about his future. Bloopers are shown. Season 13 Bachelorette Rachel Lindsay Abasolo is on the hot seat, addressing about the opinion on online bullying such as bigotry, deceitful, offensive and hateful words. Maurissa tears up on the apology for issues on diversity, stating it would get accepted as sooner.
250	11	"Week 10: Season Finale"	March 9, 2020	2410A	7.70	2.1/11
Peter and the final two ladies traveled to Alice Springs as he has an opportunity to introduce them to his family. Hannah Ann comes in first to meet with Peter's family at Longitude 131° and opens up about the first impression rose during the first night and talk along with the potential in-laws. The next day, when Madison comes in to meet with Peter's family, Madison gives Peter to talk to him, and how she happened during the overnight dates, Madison feels giving her appreciation to make next step towards love, she is feeling anxious to see Peter's parents once again as the last time was on the first one-on-one date, Peter's mom Barbara is giving a concern on Madison and is felt on proving to be a potential daughter-in-law. When Madison left, Peter and his mother are talking each other as Barbara consoles her gratitude and said, "Don't let her go!", stating that Madison would bring to Peter's family. Madison's final date takes on an airplane ride onto the overlooking with the famous Uluru and even they have set up a picnic. When Madison becomes emotional and frustrated with Peter, she decides to quit the show. Hannah Ann's final date is to travel to The Kangaroo Sanctuary as she and Peter are carrying kangaroos and each person fed a drink to feed. Hannah Ann is equally showing her heart with Peter and stated that proving the relationship would get some answers, as the show ends here.
251	12	"After the Final Rose"	March 10, 2020	2410B	8.49	2.4/12
The episode concluded when Madison had already departed Australia and left Peter's heart, as he got nervous about what he is doing next and thinking that Hannah Ann is the one planning to get engaged to her. Chris Harrison came to Peter's place, knowing Peter became frustrated and totally shocked, then Peter had his opinion to propose Hannah Ann. When Hannah Ann arrives at the final rose ceremony, Peter proposes to her and giving the final impression rose. A couple of months later, Peter meets with his family in Los Angeles and telling the news of his engagement with Hannah Ann, then Peter calls Hannah Ann to his family at this exciting moment. Several weeks later, Peter arrived at the safe house and has to talk to Hannah Ann, as Hannah Ann felt sobbed, depressed and lost her emotions, Peter follows her and declared the engagement is about to end. Then, Peter and Hannah Ann are seen for the first time since the breakup and Hannah Ann gives Peter an apology to accept the plea. Chris comes to Auburn, Alabama to see Madison and he asked the news of Peter's breakup with Hannah Ann, and he tells Madison that she is barely in love with Peter, and Madison prepares to travel to Los Angeles. Peter and Madison are seen for the first time since Madison's sudden elimination back in Australia and they have asked a second chance to pursue a relationship. Peter's mother Barbara is on stage and telling the facts over Madison's feelings when Peter's family first met her during the first date. Knowing that Barbara has really done nothing in common with Madison that specifically letting her son's relationship Madison would become a lot better. After the heated drama, new bachelorette Clare Crawley is at the stage where she has prepared to begin her own love journey.

== Controversy ==
During week five, contestant Victoria Fuller won a group date challenge, where she was chosen to appear on the March digital cover of Cosmopolitan with Weber. Shortly after the episode that featured Fuller's win aired, Cosmopolitan editor-in-chief Jessica Pels – who appeared in the episode and selected Fuller as the winner – published an online letter which stated that the magazine would not be running the cover with Fuller, due to Fuller's involvement with a clothing brand that featured a "White Lives Matter" tagline.

In the letter, Pels stated that "unequivocally, the White Lives Matter movement does not reflect the values of the Cosmo brand," adding "we stand in solidarity with Black Lives Matter, and any cause that fights to end injustices for people of color." Fuller had previously modeled for clothing brand WLM Apparel, which uses the tagline "White Lives Matter" to promote the conservation of the white marlin. The tagline has been described by nongovernmental organizations such as the Southern Poverty Law Center as "a racist response to the civil rights movement Black Lives Matter" and "a neo-Nazi group that is growing into a movement as more and more white supremacist groups take up its slogans and tactics."

During week eight, Weber's ex-girlfriend, Merissa Pence, made an appearance to warn Peter about contestant Victoria Fuller's reputation in her hometown of Virginia Beach.
