= Peter Weber (television personality) =

American reality television personality

- Born: Peter Christian Weber Jr. August 4, 1991 (age 34); Fairfax, Virginia, U.S.
- Education: Baylor University
- Occupations: Airline pilot; television personality

Peter Christian Weber Jr. (born August 4, 1991) is an American television personality and an airline pilot. Weber placed third on season 15 of The Bachelorette, and was later cast as the star of season 24 of The Bachelor. Outside of his work on television, Weber works as a pilot for United Airlines.

== Early life ==
Weber was born in Fairfax, Virginia, United States, and lived with his family in Florida before they moved to California. Weber's father, Peter, is a former pilot, while his mother, Barbara (née Figarola), is a real-estate broker and former flight attendant. She was also Miss Illinois World in 1978. He has a younger brother, Jack, who also is a pilot. His father has German ancestry, while his mother is Cuban. Weber was raised in Westlake Village, California and graduated from Oaks Christian School in 2009, where he played on the football team and was in a national rocketry competition. In his youth, Weber was a child actor who portrayed a young Roman Brady in one episode of the soap opera Days of Our Lives.

== Career ==
Weber attended Baylor University, though he left before graduating to pursue a career as a pilot. In 2015, Weber became a commercial pilot for Compass Airlines. He worked for Compass for three years, until becoming an airline transport pilot for Delta Air Lines in 2018. In May 2021, he left Delta to pilot for United Airlines.

=== Reality television ===
In 2019, Weber was cast in season 15 of The Bachelorette, starring former Miss Alabama USA Hannah Brown. Filming took place throughout the spring of 2019, and Weber was later revealed as a contestant by the American Broadcasting Company (ABC) on May 7, 2019. Weber went on to place third, being eliminated by Brown during part one of the finale episode. During the reunion episode of season six of Bachelor in Paradise, Weber was announced by host Chris Harrison as the lead for the 24th season of The Bachelor.

Weber was cast on Peacock's second season of The Traitors which was released in January 2024. He was banished on Episode 9.

Weber was announced as a contestant on Destination X, a new competition series premiering on May 27, 2025.

== Personal life ==
Sometime after finishing filming for The Bachelor, Weber began a relationship with Chicago-based attorney Kelley Flanagan, who had placed fifth in the season. They publicly confirmed their relationship in May 2020. On December 31, 2020, Weber announced on Instagram that he and Flanagan had ended their relationship. However, almost two years later, the pair rekindled their relationship. The couple confirmed they were back together in October 2022 by attending public events as a couple.

== Filmography ==
Year	Title	Role	Notes
2003	Eve's Dropping In	Timmy	Short film
2003	Days of Our Lives	Young Roman Brady	1 episode
2013	mI promise	Robbie	Short film
2014	In the Dirt	Jay	Short film
2019	The Bachelorette	Himself	Contestant; season 15 (3rd place)
2019	Bachelor in Paradise	Himself	Guest appearance; season 6
2020	The Bachelor	Himself	The Bachelor; season 24
2020	The Bachelor: The Greatest Seasons - Ever!	Himself	1 episode
2024	The Traitors	Himself	Contestant - Faithful; season 2 (9th place)
2025	Destination X	Himself	Contestant

Preceded by Colton Underwood	The Bachelor; Season 24 (2020)	Succeeded by Matt James
