= The Bachelor and race =

Race issues concerning the reality television franchise

American reality television franchise The Bachelor has long been criticized for how it handles race. Industry journalists, academics, and critics have condemned the franchise for its lack of racial diversity, its portrayal of people of color, and its contestants' racist behaviors.

Since the franchise's inception in 2002, most of the contestants on its flagship shows The Bachelor and The Bachelorette have been white. People of other races are often eliminated early in each season, and those who remain are normally of mixed white ethnicity or their heritage is downplayed. The first person of color in a leading role was Rachel Lindsay on The Bachelorette 13 (2017). The first male star of color was Matt James on The Bachelor 25 (2021). Juan Pablo Galavis on The Bachelor 18 (2014), a white Venezuelan of European heritage, was promoted as the first "non-Caucasian" lead but this was challenged by critics. The franchise's diversity issues were more evident before a 2012 racial discrimination lawsuit, although it was dismissed.

The Bachelor franchise has endured racism on and off its television programs. In the era of social media, fans have found contestants posting racist messages and photographs online. Longtime host and face of The Bachelor, Chris Harrison, left the franchise in 2021 after defending a white contestant for attending an Antebellum South-themed formal event.

== Contestant diversity ==
The Bachelor franchise has been criticized for the lack of racial diversity among its contestants. Contestants of color, particularly Black people, have historically had little representation and are eliminated early in each season. According to a 2016 study by Splinter, 59% of Black contestants leave within the first two weeks. One season is normally 10 weeks. Another 2016 study by Salon found that across the 31 seasons of The Bachelor and The Bachelorette that had aired by the time, only four winners could at least partially claim non-white ancestry. NPR provided a similar figure the same year: of the 19 women who won The Bachelor by 2016, they found that all appeared to be white except one Hispanic American and two biracial Asian–White women. In the same analysis, NPR also found that in the previous seven years, the only women of color who made it into the final few weeks were of mixed Asian-white descent. The Los Angeles Times noted that the franchise lacks in diversity when compared with other American reality shows like Dancing with the Stars, American Idol, The Biggest Loser, and The Amazing Race.

NPR argued that the show uses Hapa (mixed Asian descent) women as a weak effort to diversify. An associated professor of sociology at New York University called Hapa women "white enough to present to the family", while still exotic enough to fill a quota. Academic Rahel Dubrofsky, author of The Surveillance of Women on Reality Television, stated that women who make it far in the show often downplay their heritage. The ethnicities of Hapa women have gone largely unremarked on screen.

In 2011, show creator Mike Fleiss responded to criticism saying "We always want to cast for ethnic diversity, ... It's just that for whatever reason, they don't come forward. I wish they would." Television producer Shawn Ryan denounced Fleiss's comments, saying the practice was indicative of racism and the producers "just don't think America will watch Black Bachelor or root for mixed-race marriage". According to Scott Jeffress, who served as a co-executive producer for the first seven seasons of The Bachelor, they "always had to cast a Black girl or two" as requested from ABC. Jeffress said: "It was very obvious to me that it was token ... They're afraid of losing the audience. It's absurd."

In 2012, two Black men who applied but were denied to appear on the show filed a class-action racial discrimination lawsuit against The Bachelor. The lawsuit was dismissed. The Washington Post noted that the amount of minority contestants increased in seasons following the lawsuit.

=== The Bachelor 18 (2014) ===
Venezuelan athlete Juan Pablo Galavis was cast in the lead role for The Bachelor 18. The show promoted him as the first "non-Caucasian" bachelor. Because of his Venezuelan heritage – Galavis was born in New York state to Venezuelan parents – some critics recognized him as the first lead of color, but others believed he was still too white. Alex Nogales from the National Hispanic Media Coalition stated that ABC was taking the right steps by casting Galavis, but felt the majority of Latinos in America have darker skin and deserve greater representation. Michelle Herrera Mulligan, editor-in-chief of Cosmopolitan for Latinas, said she understands people taking issue with him being promoted as the first non-white bachelor. Refinery29 called Galavis "white-passing" The New York Post wrote that he "looks so white he could easily slip into a Mitt Romney family photo".

=== The Bachelorette 12 (2016) ===
In January 2016, Entertainment Weekly asked ABC executive Paul Lee about the show's lack of a Black lead. Lee stated:

"Yeah, yeah, we're doing a whole lot of tweaks, ... We had a Latino Bachelor, obviously. We're doing a whole lot of tweaks. ... But I'd be very surprised if The Bachelorette in the summer wasn't diverse. Perhaps I shouldn't have said that, but I think that's likely to happen."

Lee was referring to The Bachelorette 12 which, according to rumors at the time, was planning to star Caila Quinn. Being of a Filipino descent, Quinn would have been the first woman of color to star in the lead role on the show. Us Weekly reported that she was a polarizing choice, with fans voicing their displeasure on social media. After contestant JoJo Fletcher was dumped dramatically near the end of The Bachelor 20, producers made her the star for the upcoming Bachelorette season instead of Quinn. This change also coincidentally came after Paul Lee was ousted from ABC. Fletcher is half-Persian, but this was not promoted by the show. Salon opined that show still has strictures to be "as white-passing as possible" and that stars like Quinn and Fletcher are "expanding, ever so slightly, the bounds of acceptable telegenic whiteness".

=== The Bachelorette 13 (2017) ===
The first Black person in a starring role across the franchise was Rachel Lindsay on the 13th season of The Bachelorette in 2017. The show experienced a dip in viewership during her season. The season premiere garnered 5.7 million viewers — down 14.2% from the previous year and making it the least popular season premier for the show since 2010. The season received 7.6 million viewers on average, nearly a 10% drop from 8.4 million for Fletcher's season the year prior. Fleiss found the figures disturbing, saying "How else are you going to explain the fact that she's down in the ratings, when — Black or white — she was an unbelievable bachelorette? It revealed something about our fans."

=== The Bachelorette 16 (2020) ===
Tayshia Adams starred in The Bachelorette 16 after the original star Clare Crawley's departure early in the season. Adams is Black-Latino biracial.

=== The Bachelor 25 (2021) ===
After the George Floyd protests surrounding Black Lives Matter came to national attention in 2020, fans launched a petition asking the franchise to diversify. In the 18 years and 40 seasons since the franchise's inception, Lindsay had been the only Black lead (The Bachelorette 16 had not aired yet at the time because its production was suspended from the original March 2020 production date due to the COVID-19 pandemic, and was not originally planned to star Adams). Lindsay also placed pressure on ABC and threatened to dissociate herself from the series unless it began to tackle diversity issues. Among the problems she noted were a lack of diverse producers, the "problematic storylines" created for people of color, and leads who lacked in interracial dating experience. Following the campaign, ABC announced Matt James as the first Black bachelor for the upcoming 25th season. James was originally to be cast in The Bachelorette 16 featuring Crawley and he dropped out from the original cast after being named as the lead, who is of biracial background, having a black father and white mother. This was hailed by executives as a move in the right direction to reverse the franchise's troubled history with race. ABC Entertainment executive Karey Burke stated: "This is just the beginning and we will continue to take action with regard to diversity issues on this franchise." Another executive, Rob Mills, echoed Burke's sentiments, stating: "I don't want this to look like we're patting ourselves on the back or taking a victory lap. ... We don't want this, in any way, to seem like a cure-all ..."

=== The Bachelorette 18 (2021) ===
Prior to The Bachelor 25 finale, it was intended to have the continuity on the season of The Bachelor and The Bachelorette usually airs annually per television season, but the network ordered this season and the preceding season to air in 2021 and that had never done in The Bachelorette before. Michelle Young starred in The Bachelorette 18 in late 2021. Young is of a biracial background, having a black father and a white mother. During the airing of the season, all of the four finalists (Joe Coleman, Brandon Jones, Rodney Mathews and Nayte Olukoya) are also of a biracial background, having a black father and white mother as well.

=== The Bachelorette 19 (2022) ===
Ethan Kang, a Korean American advertising executive from Colorado, was the only Asian male cast on season 19 of The Bachelorette. Kang, who dated Rachel Recchia on the show, became the first monoracial Asian male to make it to the top 5, and the first to kiss The Bachelorette onscreen. Prior to Kang's appearance on the show, the most successful Asian male was John Hersey, who was eliminated by Katie Thurston in week 2 on season 17 of The Bachelorette, but dated Thurston for several months after the show. After Kang's elimination, there was a public campaign from fans to make him the first Asian Bachelor. This was endorsed by Simu Liu, the first Asian male Marvel superhero.

=== The Bachelorette 20 (2023) ===
Charity Lawson, who has been announced as the lead of season 20, is Black. After the announcement, Lawson stated "I can't wait to show little girls that look like me being in a position like this is possible". Three of the final four (Xavier Bonner, Aaron Bryant, and Dotun Olubeko) are of full Black background.

=== The Bachelorette 21 (2024) ===
Jenn Tran, who is Vietnamese American, who has been announced the lead for The Bachelorette season 21. She is the first lead of Asian ancestry.

=== The Bachelor 29 (2025) ===
Grant Ellis, who has announced as the star of season 29, is black and is the second African American male lead after Matt James. He is a mix of African American and white ancestry.

== Controversies ==
- Some journalists noted racist behavior in The Bachelorette 13 in 2017, with Rachel Lindsay in the starring role, the first Black lead. One of the men said "I'm ready to go Black and I'm never going to go back." when introducing himself to Lindsay, and another called her "a girl from the hood". The show also promoted a "battle" between contestants Lee Garrett (white) and Kenny Layne (Black), who Garrett framed as "aggressive". According to The Atlantic, Garrett played the victim and accused others of "playing the race card". The producers pitted Garrett and Layne against each other in a two-on-one date with Lindsay, in which Lindsay eliminated both men from the show. A couple weeks into the show airing, before Garrett was eliminated, fans discovered a tweet from him that read "What's the difference between the NAACP and the KKK? Wait for it...One has the sense of shame to cover their racist ass faces." When pressed about the tweet during a "Men Tell All" segment on the show, Garrett eventually admitted "That tweet was racist, and I denounce it." which received applause from the audience. The network claims they were not aware of the tweets when casting Garrett for the show.
- Victoria Fuller came in third place on The Bachelor 24 which aired in 2020. While the show was still airing, fans discovered a photo of Fuller modeling with a "White Lives Matter" cap. The photo was part of an ad campaign for Marlin Lives Matter, an organization advocating to stop overfishing of white and blue marlins. The organization used "white lives matter" and "blue lives matter" in its promotional attire. Another model in the photoshoot wore a shirt displaying the Confederate battle flag with fish in place of the stars. Meanwhile, on the show, Fuller had won a competition for her and the season's star Peter Weber to appear together on the cover of Cosmopolitan magazine, but in light of the controversy, Cosmopolitan editor-in-chief Jessica Pels announced they would not print the cover. Pels explained that "the nature of the organization is neither here nor there" and the phrase "white lives matter" is "rooted in racism and therefore problematic. ... Unequivocally, the White Lives Matter movement does not reflect the values of the Cosmo brand."
- Hannah Brown held the lead role in The Bachelorette 15 in 2019. During an Instagram Live event in 2020, Brown was singing the lyrics to DaBaby's "Rockstar" and hesitated when reaching a line that includes the word nigga, but sang it anyways. After fans commented live on her use of the word, she apologized while simultaneously laughing and doubting if she really uttered it. In the days following the incident, she was criticized from fans and other Bachelor contestants for not holding herself accountable and giving a sincere apology during the stream. Brown soon made more sincere apologies on her Instagram, and also started working with an ethnic studies professor to take "an intense, dive deep into understanding the things that [she] didn't know and having these really uncomfortable conversations". Brown became upset at how many people were coming to her defense, urging fans to stop: "It is SO important to me to tell y'all that there is no defending what I said." In 2021, Hannah Brown received further criticism for an old Instagram photo of her in an Antebellum-era dress on a plantation, and deleting the photo when criticized.
- Erich Schwer was Gabby Windey's final choice on The Bachelorette 19, which aired in 2022. While the show was still airing, fans uncovered a photo of him in blackface in his high school yearbook. Schwer issued an apology for his actions.
- Just months later, tweets surfaced of Greer Blitzer, one of the contestants on The Bachelor 27, defending blackface. Blitzer also issued an apology for her previous comments. The incident was further addressed during the Women Tell All special on March 14, 2023, with host Jesse Palmer acknowledging the franchise's failings to adequately address serious topics such as racism in the past. Blitzer also confirmed that she was educating herself on the history of blackface and had met with Dr. Kira Banks, a psychologist and diversity consultant. Palmer stated that he had also met with Banks.

=== Rachael Kirkconnell and Chris Harrison ===
While The Bachelor 25 was airing in February 2021, fans discovered photos of frontrunner and eventual winner Rachael Kirkconnell attending an "Old South" ball in 2018 with her sorority at Georgia College & State University. The ball was hosted by Kappa Alpha Order (ΚΑ), a collegiate fraternity with historical ties to the Ku Klux Klan that claims Robert E. Lee as its "spiritual founder". The Old South ball celebrates the Antebellum South; members of the fraternity dress in Confederate uniforms while women dress as Southern belles. Kappa Alpha's national offices banned Old South balls and functions of similar names and themes nationwide in 2016, two years prior to the event Kirkconnell attended.

External videos
- Rachel Lindsay interviewing Chris Harrison about Rachael Kirkconnell on Extra (YouTube)

A few days after the images were leaked online, Rachel Lindsay, a Black woman and star of The Bachelorette 13, was hosting an interview on Extra with Bachelor franchise host Chris Harrison. Lindsay asked Harrison what he thought of the allegations against Kirkconnell. At the time, Kirkconnell had not yet responded to the allegations. Harrison defended Kirkconnell:

Harrison: "I saw a picture of her at a sorority party five years ago, and that's it. Like boom like OK this girl is in this book now and she's now in this group, and I'm like really?"
Lindsay: "Well, the picture was from 2018 at an old south Antebellum party ... That's not a good look."
Harrison: "Well, Rachel, is it a good look in 2018 or is it not a good look in 2021? Because there's a big difference."
Lindsay: "It's not a good look ever because she's celebrating the old south. If I went to that party, what would I represent at that party?"

Harrison gave a 13-minute response, in which he said The Bachelor franchise was not responsible for making a statement before Kirkconnell. While claiming to not be defending her, Harrison argued that she should be granted "understanding", "grace", and "compassion", and criticized fans making judgments before she spoke on the matter. He referred to Kirkconnell as a "girl" seven times and twice as a "woman", and claimed that "50 million people" went to Old South parties in 2018. He argued that she was only having fun at a "popular" event, saying: "My guess? These girls got dressed and went to a party and had a great time. They were 18 years old. Does that make it okay? I don't know, Rachel, you tell me."

In a podcast with The Ringer in the days following the interview, Lindsay said that "his privilege was on display". She explained:

"The things that were boiling to me the most were the compassion, and the grace, and the space that Chris Harrison wanted to give to Rachael, but couldn't give it to this Rachel right here in the interview, couldn't give it to the people that were offended by the things that she did. Where was the compassion for them? ... The other thing that really got to me was when he said 'Who are you? Who is Rachel Lindsay? Who is Chris Harrison? Who are we? I mean who the hell are you?' ... Do you understand how problematic that is? ... Who is Rachel Lindsay? Rachel Lindsay is a Black woman, the very person that is affected by this Rachael Kirkconnell. ... I'm not saying he can't be apologetic, I'm not saying that he can't learn and be better from it ... but you'll have to give me some space, and you'll have to give me some compassion and some grace to take the time to really reason and accept that."

Harrison's comments were met with criticism from contestants and fans. An MSNBC opinion column argued that "grace, compassion and understanding" are luxuries frequently bestowed upon white women but rarely Black women. They also wrote that Harrison was painting an image of naïveté and innocence with a "girls will be girls" mentality that white women often can exploit to excuse bad behavior. 25 of the contestants on Kirkconnell's season made a shared post that denounced Harrison's "defense of racism". The men of The Bachelorette season 16 posted a similar message. Following the backlash, Harrison issued an apology admitting that he was excusing and defending racism in the dialogue with Lindsay. He announced that he "consulted with Warner Bros. and ABC and will be stepping aside for a period of time". Kirkconnell also issued an apology taking responsibility for her mistake, and promised future action to earn forgiveness. Lindsay became the target of online harassment in the wake of her interview with Harrison, temporarily deactivating her Instagram account as a result.

==== Harrison exits the franchise ====
In March, Harrison was interviewed by Michael Strahan on Good Morning America, his first public appearance since the Extra interview. Harrison reiterated his apology and regret for his words, and said he was seeking guidance from educators, faith leaders, and Michael Eric Dyson. He expressed interest in returning to the franchise, saying "I plan to be back and I want to be back. And I think this franchise can be an important beacon of change". He also apologized directly to Lindsay for his handling of their conversation, calling for an end to the "unacceptable" hate that she was receiving from fans. Lindsay accepted his apology, emphasizing that the issue was "bigger than just The Bachelor, it's bigger than just a reality TV show. There are a lot of issues that have come up because of this interview, and I think it's important that we continue the conversation, we continue to move forward." Harrison permanently left The Bachelor in June 2021 following a series of negotiations with franchise producers.
