= The Bachelorette (American TV series) season 4 =

Season of US television series

The Bachelorette
- Season 4
- Promotional poster
- Starring: DeAnna Pappas
- Presented by: Chris Harrison
- No. of contestants: 25
- Winner: Jesse Csincsak
- Runner-up: Jason Mesnick
- No. of episodes: 11 (including 3 specials)

Release
- Original network: ABC
- Original release: May 19 – July 7, 2008

Additional information
- Filming dates: March 19 – May 2, 2008

Season chronology
- ← Previous; Season 3 Next → Season 5

The fourth season of the ABC reality television series The Bachelorette premiered on May 19, 2008, after a three-year absence. This season featured 26-year-old DeAnna Pappas, a real estate agent from Newnan, Georgia. Pappas was rejected by Brad Womack in the eleventh season of The Bachelor. This was the first The Bachelor franchise including the spin-off, The Bachelorette to expand from 60 to 120 minutes for the entire season.

The season concluded on July 7, 2008, with Pappas accepting a proposal from 26-year-old professional snowboarder Jesse Csincsak. Their wedding was set for May 9, 2009, but they ended their engagement in November 2008.

== Contestants ==
Name	Age	Hometown	Occupation	Outcome	Place
Jesse Csincsak	26	Breckenridge, Colorado	Professional Snowboarder	Winner	1
Jason Mesnick	31	Kirkland, Washington	Account Executive	Runner-up	2
Jeremy Anderson	30	Dallas, Texas	Real Estate Attorney	Week 7	3
Graham Bunn	29	Raleigh, North Carolina	Professional Basketball Player	Week 6	4
Sean Ramey	33	Louisville, Kentucky	Martial Artist	Week 5	5–6
Blaine Twilley	33	Tulsa, Oklahoma	Debt Manager	Week 5	5–6
Brian Westendorf	31	Balch Springs, Texas	High School Football Coach	Week 4	7
Frederick "Fred" Greif	30	Skokie, Illinois	Lawyer	Week 4	8
Robert Fair	28	Burlingame, California	Chef	Week 4	9
Paul Brosseau	23	Bonnyville, Alberta	Sales Manager	Week 3	10–11
Ronald Mayer	36	Greeley, Colorado	Barber Shop Owner	Week 3	10–11
Richard Mathy	27	Sauquoit, New York	Science Teacher	Week 3	12
Chris Bradshaw	29	Fort Worth, Texas	Medical Sales Rep	Week 2	13–15
Eric Papachristos	32	Weymouth, Massachusetts	Senior Analyst	Week 2	13–15
Ryan Hoag	28	Minneapolis, Minnesota	Professional Football Player	Week 2	13–15
Brian Winchester	29	New Castle, Indiana	Computer Network Consultant	Week 1	16–25
Chandler Fulton	25	Virginia Beach, Virginia	Insurance Rep	Week 1	16–25
Donato Capodanno	26	Lexington, South Carolina	Sales Rep	Week 1	16–25
Greg Wilkinson	28	Rockport, Massachusetts	Personal Trainer	Week 1	16–25
Jeffrey Harris	27	Miami, Florida	Mathematics Teacher	Week 1	16–25
Jonathan "Jon" Konkel	35	Williston, North Dakota	Resort Manager	Week 1	16–25
Luke Hamilton	27	Faith, North Carolina	Oyster Farmer	Week 1	16–25
Patrick Carlson	26	Glenwood, Illinois	Financial Analyst	Week 1	16–25
Patrick Durr	27	Elmhurst, Illinois	Internet Marketing	Week 1	16–25
Spero Stamboulis	38	Ellington, Connecticut	Actor	Week 1	16–25

=== Future appearances ===
==== The Bachelor ====
Jason Mesnick was chosen as the lead of the thirteenth season of The Bachelor, with DeAnna Pappas making a surprise appearance in the finale. DeAnna made another appearance in the fifteenth season premiere of The Bachelor to receive a formal apology from Brad Womack.

==== Bachelor Pad ====
Graham Bunn returned for the second season of Bachelor Pad. He and his partner, Michelle Money, were the runners-up.

Ryan Hoag returned for the third season of Bachelor Pad. He was eliminated in week 2.

==== Bachelor in Paradise ====
Season 1

Graham returned for the inaugural season of Bachelor in Paradise. He split from AshLee Frazier in week 7.

==== Other appearances ====
Outside of the Bachelor Nation franchise, Graham appeared as a contestant in the Bachelors vs. Bachelorettes special during season 7 of Wipeout.

== Call-out order ==
Order	Bachelors	Week							
Order	Bachelors	1	2	3	4	5	6	7	8
1	Brian - TX	Jeremy	Paul	Robert	Jesse	Jeremy	Jesse	Jesse	Jesse
2	Paul	Jesse	Graham	Jason	Sean	Jason	Jeremy	Jason	Jason
3	Graham	Richard	Jeremy (Note: The contestant chose to stay at the mansion for the week)	Fred	Jason	Graham	Jason	Jeremy	
4	Sean	Ronald	Ronald	Twilley	Jeremy	Jesse	Graham		
5	Richard	Graham	Jesse	Jesse	Twilley	Sean; Twilley			
6	Jason	Eric	Robert	Jeremy	Graham	Sean; Twilley			
7	Spero	Robert	Brian - TX	Brian - TX	Brian - TX				
8	Jesse	Sean	Jason	Graham	Fred				
9	Jon	Ryan	Fred	Sean	Robert				
10	Chris	Chris	Sean	Paul; Ronald					
11	Brian - IN	Paul	Richard	Paul; Ronald					
12	Jeffrey	Fred	Twilley	Richard					
13	Donato	Twilley	Chris; Eric; Ryan						
14	Ryan	Jason	Chris; Eric; Ryan						
15	Twilley	Brian - TX	Chris; Eric; Ryan						
16	Ronald	Brian - IN; Chandler; Donato; Greg; Jeffrey; Jon; Luke; Patrick C. Patrick D. Spero							
17	Patrick C.	Brian - IN; Chandler; Donato; Greg; Jeffrey; Jon; Luke; Patrick C. Patrick D. Spero							
18	Luke	Brian - IN; Chandler; Donato; Greg; Jeffrey; Jon; Luke; Patrick C. Patrick D. Spero							
19	Eric	Brian - IN; Chandler; Donato; Greg; Jeffrey; Jon; Luke; Patrick C. Patrick D. Spero							
20	Robert	Brian - IN; Chandler; Donato; Greg; Jeffrey; Jon; Luke; Patrick C. Patrick D. Spero							
21	Chandler	Brian - IN; Chandler; Donato; Greg; Jeffrey; Jon; Luke; Patrick C. Patrick D. Spero							
22	Greg	Brian - IN; Chandler; Donato; Greg; Jeffrey; Jon; Luke; Patrick C. Patrick D. Spero							
23	Fred	Brian - IN; Chandler; Donato; Greg; Jeffrey; Jon; Luke; Patrick C. Patrick D. Spero							
24	Patrick D.	Brian - IN; Chandler; Donato; Greg; Jeffrey; Jon; Luke; Patrick C. Patrick D. Spero							
25	Jeremy	Brian - IN; Chandler; Donato; Greg; Jeffrey; Jon; Luke; Patrick C. Patrick D. Spero							

The contestant received the first impression rose
The contestant received a rose during a date
The contestant was eliminated
The contestant was eliminated during a date
The contestant won the competition
Explanatory notes

== Episodes ==
No. overall	No. in season	Title	Original release date	Prod. code	U.S. viewers (millions)	Rating/share (18–49)
26	1	"Week 1"	May 19, 2008	401	8.08	2.9/7
27	2	"Week 2"	May 26, 2008	402	5.59	2.0/5
28	3	"Week 3"	June 2, 2008	403	6.46	2.2/6
29	4	"Week 4"	June 9, 2008	404	6.35	2.2/7
30	5	"DeAnna Tells All"	June 16, 2008	N/A	5.90	1.8/6
31	6	"Week 5"	June 16, 2008	405	7.05	2.5/7
32	7	"Week 6"	June 23, 2008	406	7.52	2.5/8
33	8	"Week 7"	June 30, 2008	407	7.30	2.4/8
34	9	"The Men Tell All"	June 30, 2008	N/A	7.48	2.6/7
35	10	"Week 8"	July 7, 2008	408	9.53	3.4/10
36	11	"After the Final Rose"	July 7, 2008	N/A	9.90	3.7/10
