= The Bachelor (American TV series) season 11 =

The Bachelor
- Season 11
- Promotional poster
- Starring: Brad Womack
- Presented by: Chris Harrison
- No. of contestants: 25
- Winner: No winner
- Runners-up: Jenni Croft; DeAnna Pappas
- No. of episodes: 10

Release
- Original network: ABC
- Original release: September 24 – November 20, 2007

Season chronology
- ← Previous; Season 10 Next → Season 12

The eleventh season of ABC reality television series The Bachelor premiered on September 24, 2007. The season features Brad Womack, a 34-year-old bar owner from Austin, Texas, courting 25 women. On November 19, 2007, during the final rose ceremony, Womack became the first lead in the history of the show to reject all of the contestants.

== Contestants ==
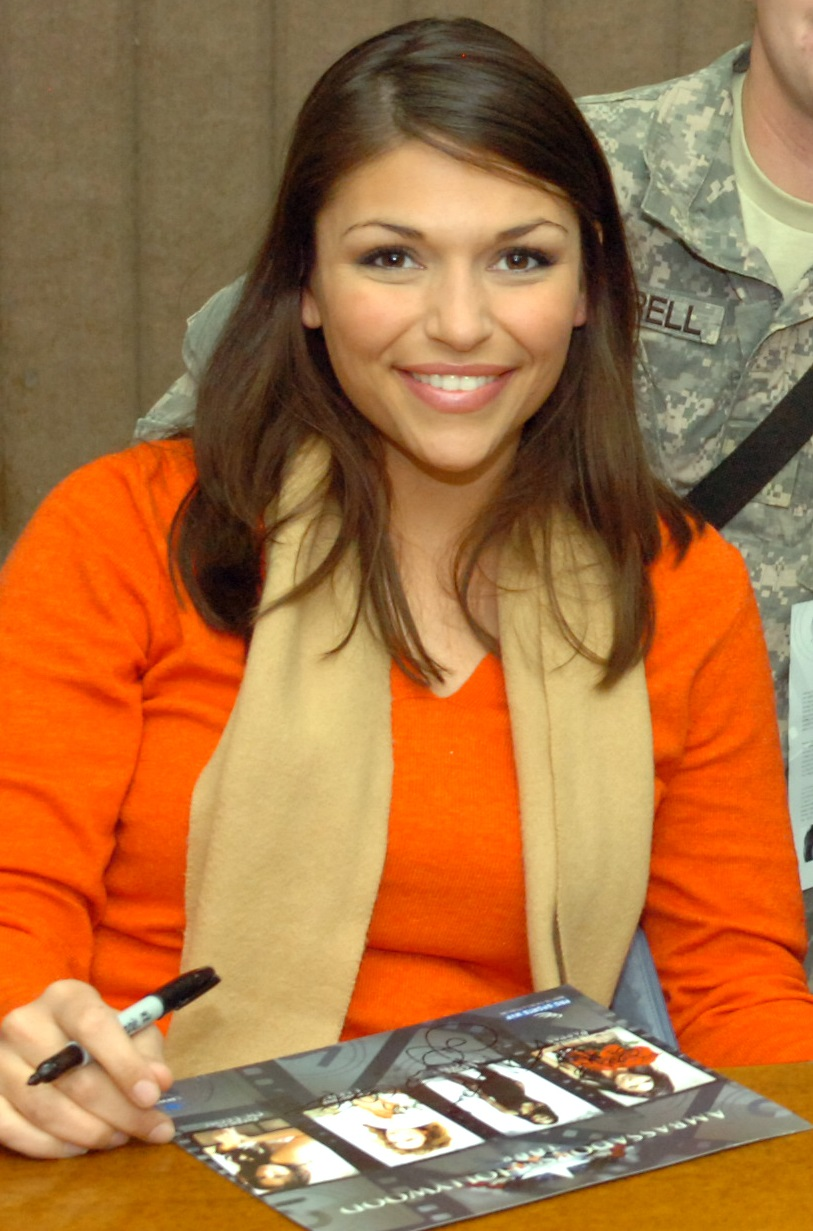
DeAnna Pappas

Biographical information according to ABC official series site, plus footnoted additions

Name	Age	Hometown	Occupation	Outcome	Place
DeAnna Pappas	25	Newnan, Georgia	Realtor	Co-runners-up	2
Jenni Croft	27	Wichita, Kansas	Phoenix Suns Cheerleader	Co-runners-up	2
Bettina Bell	27	Washington, D.C.	Realtor	Week 7	3
Sheena Stewart	23	Walnut Creek, California	Internet marketing executive	Week 6	4
Hillary Reisinger	27	Philadelphia, Pennsylvania	Registered nurse	Week 5	5–6
Kristy Katzmann	29	Gurnee, Illinois	Acupuncturist	Week 5	5–6
McCarten Delaney	26	Lemon Grove, California	Account manager	Week 4	7–8
Estefania "Stephy" Leon	26	Atlanta, Georgia	Executive assistant	Week 4	7–8
Jade Beazley	24	Nashville, Tennessee	Boutique sales worker	Week 4	9
Lindsey Hawkins	25	Livonia, Michigan	Model	Week 3	10–12
Sarah Newlon	23	O'Fallon, Illinois	Bar manager	Week 3	10–12
Solisa Shoop	25	Georgetown, Texas	Esthetician	Week 3	10–12
Erin Gardner	25	Tampa, Florida	Publishing sales executive	Week 2	13–15
Mallory Simons	24	Honolulu, Hawaii	Nanny	Week 2	13–15
Michele Leavy	30	South Brunswick, New Jersey	Realtor	Week 2	13–15
Jessica Kiss	27	Lady Lake, Florida	News anchor	Week 1	16–25
Julia "Juli" Gilliam	24	Chicago, Illinois	Law student	Week 1	16–25
Kimberly "Kim" Hessel	31	Woodbridge, Connecticut	Realtor	Week 1	16–25
Lori Langley	33	Annapolis, Maryland	Biology teacher	Week 1	16–25
Melissa Buschel	28	Armonk, New York	Event planner	Week 1	16–25
Morgan Becker	24	Tempe, Arizona	Graduate student	Week 1	16–25
Natalie Velasco	25	Duncanville, Texas	Law student	Week 1	16–25
Regina Doringa	31	San Diego, California	Account representative	Week 1	16–25
Tauni Nessler	31	St. Louis Park, Minnesota	Emergency room nurse	Week 1	16–25
Susan Coolidge	35	St. Charles, Illinois	Project analyst	Week 1	16–25

=== Future appearances ===
==== The Bachelorette ====
DeAnna Pappas was chosen in the fourth season of The Bachelorette, while Jenni Croft made an appearance in that season as well.

==== The Bachelor ====
In 2010, Womack returned for the second time as the bachelor in the fifteenth season of The Bachelor to be aired the following year. Additionally, Pappas and Croft appeared in the premiere episode where they gave an apology to Womack.

==== Bachelor Pad ====
In 2012, Sarah Newlon returned for the third season of Bachelor Pad. She and her partner, Chris Bukowski, were eliminated in week 8, finishing in 3rd/4th place.

==== Labor of Love ====
In 2020, Kristy Katzmann starred in the dating game show Labor of Love.

== Call-out order ==
#	Bachelorettes	Week							
#	Bachelorettes	1	2	3	4	5	6	7	8
1	DeAnna	Jenni	DeAnna	Stephy	Jenni	DeAnna	DeAnna	Jenni	DeAnna
2	Jenni	Jade	Sarah	Hilary	Bettina	Jenni	Jenni	DeAnna	Jenni
3	Bettina	Bettina	Kristy	Kristy	DeAnna	Sheena	Bettina	Bettina	
4	Sheena	McCarten	Bettina	Sheena	Kristy	Bettina	Sheena		
5	Hilary	Hilary	Hilary	McCarten	Sheena	Hilary; Kristy			
6	Kristy	DeAnna	Stephy	Jenni	Hilary	Hilary; Kristy			
7	McCarten	Michele	Sheena	Jade	McCarten; Stephy				
8	Stephy	Sheena	McCarten	DeAnna	McCarten; Stephy				
9	Jade	Stephy	Jenni	Bettina	Jade				
10	Lindsey	Erin	Lindsey	Lindsey; Sarah; Solisa					
11	Sarah	Solisa	Jade	Lindsey; Sarah; Solisa					
12	Solisa	Lindsey	Solisa	Lindsey; Sarah; Solisa					
13	Erin	Sarah	Erin; Mallory; Michele						
14	Mallory	Mallory	Erin; Mallory; Michele						
15	Michele	Kristy	Erin; Mallory; Michele						
16	Jessica	Jessica; Juli; Kim; Lori; Melissa; Morgan; Natalie; Regina; Susan; Tauni							
17	Juli	Jessica; Juli; Kim; Lori; Melissa; Morgan; Natalie; Regina; Susan; Tauni							
18	Kim	Jessica; Juli; Kim; Lori; Melissa; Morgan; Natalie; Regina; Susan; Tauni							
19	Lori	Jessica; Juli; Kim; Lori; Melissa; Morgan; Natalie; Regina; Susan; Tauni							
20	Melissa	Jessica; Juli; Kim; Lori; Melissa; Morgan; Natalie; Regina; Susan; Tauni							
21	Morgan	Jessica; Juli; Kim; Lori; Melissa; Morgan; Natalie; Regina; Susan; Tauni							
22	Natalie	Jessica; Juli; Kim; Lori; Melissa; Morgan; Natalie; Regina; Susan; Tauni							
23	Regina	Jessica; Juli; Kim; Lori; Melissa; Morgan; Natalie; Regina; Susan; Tauni							
24	Susan	Jessica; Juli; Kim; Lori; Melissa; Morgan; Natalie; Regina; Susan; Tauni							
25	Tauni	Jessica; Juli; Kim; Lori; Melissa; Morgan; Natalie; Regina; Susan; Tauni							

The contestant received the first impression rose
The contestant was eliminated
The contestant received a rose during the date
The contestant was eliminated during the date

== Episodes ==
No. overall	No. in season	Title	Original release date	Prod. code	U.S. viewers (millions)	Rating/share (18–49)
89	1	"Week 1"	September 24, 2007	1101	9.23	3.5/9
90	2	"Week 2"	October 1, 2007	1102	8.85	3.4/9
91	3	"Week 3"	October 8, 2007	1103	8.82	3.2/8
92	4	"Week 4"	October 15, 2007	1104	8.93	3.4/9
93	5	"Week 5"	October 22, 2007	1105	8.92	3.3/8
94	6	"Week 6"	October 29, 2007	1106	9.76	3.6/9
95	7	"Week 7"	November 5, 2007	1107	9.23	3.4/9
96	8	"The Women Tell All"	November 12, 2007	N/A	8.96	3.3/9
97	9	"Week 8"	November 19, 2007	1108	11.22	4.2/11
Brad took two women to meet his family; his mom Shelley, his younger brother Wesley and his identical twin Chad. DeAnna was first to arrive at his door. He forewarned them that she's a strong independent woman from Atlanta, Georgia. Brad joked about having his future wife as an employee because she used to be a bartender when she was just college-aged. It went very well. His mom talked to her about family values, relationship values and her feelings for him. Shelly stated she could see that Brad really like DeAnna. He kept holding her waist and gazing at her. The brothers think she's a great catch. DeAnna felt awesome because Brad was just his old confident, playful self with his folks. They were hanging out by the pool fooling around. DeAnna revealed that they are kind, friendly, warm and put her at ease. After she left, the family discussed his situation while waiting for Jenni. DeAnna had made such a great impression that it's gonna be a high stake for Jenni to make them change their mind about whom they think would complement Brad. Jenni arrived later. His mom asked her about where they are at, she admitted she hadn't dropped the L word yet. Not that she's scared to be vulnerable but she just wanted it to say it when the time felt right. She, too, felt stronger for him each day and wanted to be with him. She then went out to play catch with his brothers. They're both wonderful, eligible women. Brad told his mom that he thinks about DeAnna when he's with Jenni and vice versa. He loves them both. One possesses the appeal that the other didn't. He tries to make up his mind. He felt slightly stronger for DeAnna. But in the end, when DeAnna really thought that they'll be in a monogamous relationship because she's the last one standing, he told her that he couldn't marry her. He had a reason that he sent Jenni home but he couldn't find a reason for DeAnna. He only told her that he wasn't sure if their relationship was going to last, he's not fully there with her. He was not that deeply into either of them. He fell for 23-year-old Sarah Newlon more deeply than anybody else in the beginning but she was disqualified for not recognizing his twin brother. That incident made him think she isn't into him as much as he's into her and he was so hurt; he wasn't willing to compromise. Neither of these two ladies was the ultimate frontrunner. Both ladies went home heartbroken.
98	10	"After the Final Rose"	November 20, 2007	N/A	12.30	4.1/11

== Ratings ==
#	Air Date	Rating	Share	18-49 (Rating/Share)	Viewers (m)	Weekly Rank
1	September 24, 2007	6.6	11	3.5/9	9.57	#41
2	October 1, 2007	6.8	11	3.6/9	9.58	#39
3	October 8, 2007	6.9	10	3.3/8	9.92	#37
4	October 15, 2007	6.7	11	3.4/9	9.30	#41
5	October 22, 2007	6.6	11	3.4/8	9.20	#43
6	October 29, 2007	7.5	12	3.9/10	10.59	
7	November 5, 2007	7.7	12	4.0/10	10.85	
8	November 12, 2007	6.5	11	3.4/9	9.17	
9	November 19, 2007	8.1	13	4.3/10	11.61	
