= The Bachelor (American TV series) season 25 =

Season of television series

The Bachelor
- Season 25
- Promotional poster
- Starring: Matt James
- Presented by: Chris Harrison; Emmanuel Acho
- No. of contestants: 37
- Winner: Rachael Kirkconnell
- Runner-up: Michelle Young
- No. of episodes: 12

Release
- Original network: ABC
- Original release: January 4 – March 15, 2021

Additional information
- Filming dates: October 10 – November 21, 2020

Season chronology
- ← Previous; Season 24 Next → Season 26

The twenty-fifth season of The Bachelor premiered on January 4, 2021. This season features 28-year-old Matt James, a real estate broker and charity founder from Raleigh, North Carolina.

James was originally cast on the sixteenth season of The Bachelorette featuring Clare Crawley. However, after filming was delayed due to the impacts of the COVID-19 pandemic, he was instead selected to be The Bachelor. The entire season was filmed at Nemacolin Woodlands Resort in Farmington, Pennsylvania due to the pandemic, making this was the first and only season to film in a single location in The Bachelor. James is the first Black male lead in The Bachelor franchise.

The season concluded on March 15, 2021, with James choosing to pursue a relationship with 24-year-old graphic designer Rachael Kirkconnell. However, during the After the Final Rose special, it was revealed that James had broken up with Kirkconnell after her racially insensitive past came to light. They got back together in April 2021, but broke up for good in January 2025.

This was the final Bachelor Nation season to feature Chris Harrison as the host.

== Production ==
=== Casting and contestants ===
On June 12, 2020, James was announced as the next Bachelor on Good Morning America. James is the first Black Bachelor in franchise history, and while it was intended and announced as the second African-American lead (after Rachel Lindsay of The Bachelorette 13), the sudden introduction of Tayshia Adams as a co-lead on The Bachelorette 16, made James the third African-American lead of the franchise. He is also the first lead to have not previously appeared on a series in The Bachelor franchise since Matt Grant in season 12. (Note: Brad Womack, who had served as lead for season 15, had not appeared on a season of The Bachelorette either, but had previously appeared on the show as the lead in season 11.)

Notable contestants include Mariela "Mari" Pepin, Miss Maryland USA 2019 and top 10 finalist in Miss USA 2019; Kit Keenan, daughter of fashion designer Cynthia Rowley; Sydney Johnson, daughter of former New York Giants running backs coach and current University of Maryland analyst Craig Johnson; Abigail Heringer, the first deaf contestant in The Bachelor franchise; and Catalina Morales, who was crowned Miss Universe Puerto Rico 2015 and competed at Miss Universe 2015.

=== Filming and development ===
As with the sixteenth season of The Bachelorette, the season was filmed in a bio-secure bubble at the Nemacolin Woodlands Resort in Farmington, Pennsylvania, 60 miles southeast of Pittsburgh due to quarantine safety protocols, making this the first The Bachelor season not to film in the traditional Villa de la Vina mansion in Agoura Hills, California, and the first location other than the mansion since season 11.

Former contestants Ashley Iaconetti, Ben Higgins, and Tyler Cameron, retired professional boxer Mia St. John, musician Aloe Blacc, and professional drift racer Tony Angelo made guest appearances this season.

== Contestants ==
On October 5, 2020, 43 potential contestants were revealed on The Bachelor social media sites. On December 11, 2020, the final cast of 32 women was revealed. In week 3, five new women joined the cast, bringing the total number of contestants to 37.

In week 6, season 23 contestant Heather Martin asked to join the cast, but James declined prior to the rose ceremony.

Name	Age	Hometown	Occupation	Arrived	Outcome	Place	Ref
Rachael Kirkconnell	24	Cumming, Georgia	Graphic Designer	Week 1	Winner	1	
Michelle Young	27	Woodbury, Minnesota	Teacher	Week 3	Runner-Up	2	
Brianna "Bri" Springs	24	San Antonio, Texas	Communications Manager	Week 1	Week 9	3	
Serena Pitt	23	Markham, Ontario	Publicist	Week 1	Week 8	4 (quit)	
Pieper James	23	Happy Valley, Oregon	Graduate Student	Week 1	Week 7	5	
Jessenia Cruz	27	El Paso, Texas	Social Media Marketer	Week 1	Week 7	6	
Kit Keenan	21	Manhattan, New York	Fashion Entrepreneur	Week 1	Week 7	7 (quit)	
Abigail Heringer	25	Salem, Oregon	Client Financial Manager	Week 1	Week 7	8	
Chelsea Vaughn	28	Marietta, Georgia	Runway Model	Week 1	Week 6	9–10	
Serena Chew	24	San Bruno, California	Flight Attendant	Week 1	Week 6	9–10	
Katie Thurston	29	Lynnwood, Washington	Bank Marketing Manager	Week 1	Week 6	11	
Brittany Galvin	23	Hinsdale, Illinois	Model	Week 3	Week 5	12–14	
Mearg "Magi" Tareke	32	Adwa, Ethiopia (Note: Magi Tareke is originally from Adwa in Ethiopia but was residing in Washington, D.C. at the time of casting and filming.)	Pharmacist	Week 1	Week 5	12–14	
Ryan Claytor	26	Mechanicsville, Virginia	Dancer/Choreographer	Week 3	Week 5	12–14	
Meredith "MJ" Snyder	23	Hudson, Ohio	Hairstylist	Week 1	Week 5	15	
Catalina Morales	29	Caguas, Puerto Rico (Note: Catalina Morales is originally from Caguas in Puerto Rico but was residing in New York City at the time of casting and filming.)	Former Miss Universe Puerto Rico	Week 3	Week 4	16–19	
Lauren Maddox	29	Miami, Florida	Corporate Attorney	Week 1	Week 4	16–19	
Mariela "Mari" Pepin	24	Severn, Maryland	Marketing Director	Week 1	Week 4	16–19	
Victoria Larson	27	Los Angeles, California	Queen	Week 1	Week 4	16–19	
Anna Redman	24	Owatonna, Minnesota	Copywriter	Week 1	Week 4	20	
Kaili Anderson	26	San Diego, California	Hostess	Week 1	Week 3	21–23	
Khaylah Epps	28	Durham, North Carolina	Healthcare Advocate	Week 1	Week 3	21–23	
Kimberly "Kim" Li	28	Cypress, California	ICU Nurse	Week 3	Week 3	21–23	
Sarah Trott	24	Scripps Ranch, California	Broadcast Journalist	Week 1	Week 3	24 (quit)	
Alana Milne	26	San Antonio, Texas	Photographer	Week 1	Week 2	25–29	
Illeana Pennetto	25	South Salem, New York	Health Food Developer	Week 1	Week 2	25–29	
Kristin Hopkins	27	Virginia Beach, Virginia	Attorney	Week 1	Week 2	25–29	
Marylynn Sienna	28	Huntington Beach, California	Event Coordinator	Week 1	Week 2	25–29	
Sydney Johnson	28	Franklin, Tennessee	Marketing Specialist	Week 1	Week 2	25–29	
Alicia Holloway	24	Morgantown, West Virginia	Professional Ballerina	Week 1	Week 1	30–37	
Amber Andrews	30	Rialto, California	Nursing Student	Week 1	Week 1	30–37	
Carolyn Vallejo	30	Newburyport, Massachusetts	Journalist	Week 1	Week 1	30–37	
Casandra Suarez	25	Lodi, California	Social Worker	Week 1	Week 1	30–37	
Corrinne Jones	22	Pomfret, Connecticut	Marketing Manager	Week 1	Week 1	30–37	
Emani Curl	25	Albuquerque, New Mexico	Realtor	Week 1	Week 1	30–37	
Kimberly Courneya	28	Lake Tapps, Washington	Airline Recruiter	Week 1	Week 1	30–37	
Saneh Ste. Claire	25	Vilano Beach, Florida	IT Consultant	Week 1	Week 1	30–37	

=== Future appearances ===
==== The Bachelorette ====
Katie Thurston and Michelle Young were both chosen as the leads for seasons 17 and 18 of The Bachelorette respectively.

==== Bachelor in Paradise ====
Season 7

Abigail Heringer, Alana Milne, Anna Redman, Chelsea Vaughn, Jessenia Cruz, Mari Pepin, Pieper James, Serena Chew, Serena Pitt and Victoria Larson returned for season 7 of Bachelor in Paradise. Serena C. and Victoria were eliminated in week 1. Alana and Pieper quit in week 3. Jessenia was eliminated in week 3. Abigail split from Noah Erb in week 5, although they've gotten back together. Chelsea was eliminated in week 5. Anna split from James Bonsall in week 6. Mari and Serena P. got engaged in week 6 to Kenny Braasch and Joe Amabile, respectively.

Season 8

Jessenia and Brittany Galvin returned for season 8 of Bachelor in Paradise. Jessenia quit in week 5. Brittany left in a relationship with Tyler Norris in week 6.

==== Bachelor in Paradise Canada ====
Season 1

Illeana Pennetto returned for the inaugural season of Bachelor in Paradise Canada. She split from Brendan Scanzano in week 5.

Season 2

Chelsea returned for the second season of Bachelor in Paradise Canada. She left in a relationship with Austin Tinsley in week 6.

==== Dancing with the Stars ====
Matt James competed on season 30 of Dancing with the Stars. He was partnered with Lindsay Arnold. They were eliminated in week 4, finishing in 12th place.

==== House of Villains ====
Victoria appeared on the second season of House of Villains.

== Call-out order ==
Order	Bachelorettes	Week									
Order	Bachelorettes	1	2	3	4	5	6	7	8	9	10
1	Bri	Abigail	Bri	Rachael	Bri	Rachael	Pieper	Serena P.	Michelle	Michelle	Rachael
2	Rachael	Bri	Lauren	Serena P.	Michelle	Abigail	Michelle	Rachael	Rachael	Rachael	Michelle
3	Sarah	Rachael	Sarah	Chelsea	Pieper (Note: Pieper had the rose from the second group date. The segment of the date when Matt gave the rose to her and her rose ceremony appearance were both unaired.)	Kit	Bri	Bri	Bri	Bri	
4	Jessenia	Chelsea	Pieper	MJ	Brittany	Jessenia	Rachael	Michelle	Serena P.		
5	Chelsea	Sarah	Kit	Pieper	Ryan	Serena P.	Serena P.	Pieper			
6	Mari	MJ	Magi	Bri	Rachael	Michelle	Kit	Jessenia			
7	Magi	Serena P.	Rachael	Magi	Serena P.	Pieper	Jessenia	Kit			
8	Carolyn	Khaylah	Abigail	Michelle	Magi	Bri	Abigail	Abigail			
9	Sydney	Kristin	Chelsea	Mari	Kit	Chelsea	Chelsea; Serena C.				
10	Kristin	Kit	Jessenia	Ryan	MJ	Katie	Chelsea; Serena C.				
11	Anna	Magi	Katie	Kit	Jessenia	Serena C.	Katie				
12	Khaylah	Pieper	Serena C.	Serena C.	Katie	Brittany; Magi; Ryan					
13	Serena C.	Mari	Serena P.	Abigail	Abigail	Brittany; Magi; Ryan					
14	Serena P.	Illeana	Khaylah	Katie	Chelsea	Brittany; Magi; Ryan					
15	Alicia	Jessenia	Mari	Victoria	Serena C.	MJ					
16	Saneh	Kaili	MJ	Lauren	Catalina; Lauren; Mari; Victoria						
17	Alana	Marylynn	Anna	Brittany	Catalina; Lauren; Mari; Victoria						
18	Kaili	Serena C.	Kaili	Jessenia	Catalina; Lauren; Mari; Victoria						
19	Abigail	Lauren	Victoria	Anna	Catalina; Lauren; Mari; Victoria						
20	Corrinne	Sydney	Alana; Illeana; Kristin; Marylynn; Sydney	Catalina	Anna						
21	Marylynn	Alana	Alana; Illeana; Kristin; Marylynn; Sydney	Kaili; Khaylah; Kim							
22	Emani	Katie	Alana; Illeana; Kristin; Marylynn; Sydney	Kaili; Khaylah; Kim							
23	Lauren	Anna	Alana; Illeana; Kristin; Marylynn; Sydney	Kaili; Khaylah; Kim							
24	Pieper	Victoria	Alana; Illeana; Kristin; Marylynn; Sydney	Sarah							
25	MJ	Alicia; Amber; Carolyn; Casandra; Corrinne; Emani; Kimberly; Saneh									
26	Katie	Alicia; Amber; Carolyn; Casandra; Corrinne; Emani; Kimberly; Saneh									
27	Amber	Alicia; Amber; Carolyn; Casandra; Corrinne; Emani; Kimberly; Saneh									
28	Kimberly	Alicia; Amber; Carolyn; Casandra; Corrinne; Emani; Kimberly; Saneh									
29	Casandra	Alicia; Amber; Carolyn; Casandra; Corrinne; Emani; Kimberly; Saneh									
30	Illeana	Alicia; Amber; Carolyn; Casandra; Corrinne; Emani; Kimberly; Saneh									
31	Kit	Alicia; Amber; Carolyn; Casandra; Corrinne; Emani; Kimberly; Saneh									
32	Victoria	Alicia; Amber; Carolyn; Casandra; Corrinne; Emani; Kimberly; Saneh									
33	Brittany (Note: Brittany, Catalina, Kim, Michelle, and Ryan all entered the competition in Week 3.)										
34	Michelle										
35	Ryan										
36	Kim										
37	Catalina										

The contestant received the first impression rose
The contestant received a rose during the date
The contestant received a rose outside of a rose ceremony or date
The contestant was eliminated
The contestant was eliminated outside the rose ceremony
The contestant was eliminated during the date
The contestant quit the competition
The contestant won the competition

== Episodes ==
No. overall	No. in season	Title	Original release date	Prod. code	U.S. viewers (millions)	Rating (18–49)
252	1	"Week 1: Season Premiere"	January 4, 2021	2501	5.23	1.3
The season begins with Matt started on his early life as his parents were split when he was young. Matt's mom Patty gives a moral support to her son being on the show. In the first night, Matt is standing at the Chateau Lafayette in Nemacolin Woodlands Resort before meeting the women. Memorable entrances include Mari has thinking a smooth favor on Matt, Sydney thinks Matt on being hottest human has ever met, Anna presents a bachelor surviving kit, Khaylah drives a pick up truck all the way from North Carolina, Alicia shows her ballerina skills, Saneh is seen wearing a creep goat slippers, Alana presents a pasta to grab a tasty romance with Matt, Kaili wears her lingerie where she works as a hostess, MJ drives a pizza delivery truck, Katie presents a sex toy, Amber shows up riding a bicycle, Kimberly holds a fish to toss Matt and Victoria sends through on a carriage knowing that she acts as a "queen" even she got slipped. Katie's sex toy is placed on a table for display, while Serena P. and Matt play a game of chess, Khaylah gets some time on the truck with Matt knowing on their roots in North Carolina, Jessenia gives Matt a dance lesson, Chelsea presents a runway demonstration and Pieper plays a skee-ball game. Victoria soon started to harass the girls, especially Amber. Abigail gets her time with Matt telling that she has cochlear implants being on her hearing disability and Matt gave her a first impression rose. At the rose ceremony, Alicia, Amber, Carolyn, Cassandra, Corrinne, Emani, Kimberly and Saneh are sent home.
253	2	"Week 2"	January 11, 2021	2502	4.74	1.2
Bri gets the first one-on-one date of the season as she and Matt had to ride all-terrain vehicle across Nemacolin and even the vehicle becomes to stumble while across the mud and until they have set for a relax on a hot tub. Matt shows his lumbering skills to chop wood using for fire. Bri and Matt are on a hot tub and present with a champagne. In the night portion, Bri was raised by her mom when she was 13 who got pregnant with her. Bri got the rose and a fireworks display was put in place. The first group date of the season had Victoria, Chelsea, Serena P., Abigail, Sydney, Illeana, Kristin, Lauren, Jessenia, Serena C., Kit, Kaili, Katie, MJ, Mari, Pieper, Rachael and Khaylah to take part for a wedding-themed date. Matt and celebrity photographer Franco Lacosta to present the women as the brides and Matt as the groom. Chris announces they would take part on a capture the flag challenge in a battle of two teams of nine with paint-soaked purses, bouquets and a wedding cake. Long-time producer Paul "Big Paulie" Danner served as a referee. The red team won and had to spend the after party with Matt. Mari was awarded a "MVB" award despite on the gold team (in which they lost) and was rewarded to take part for that party. At the party, Lauren has barely time to speak with Matt since her limo arrival in the first night, informing about the marriage of her parents, Victoria opens up her insecure feelings that she could be here for certain reasons, and Matt kisses her. In the end, Lauren got the group date rose. Sarah gets the one-on-one date, where they have to fly a biplane overlooking Nemacolin. They later shared with a champagne drink, Sarah tells a backstory to Matt about on her father being diagnosed with ALS that she has been struggled on her father's ill health. In the night portion, Sarah had quit her job as a journalist in a local TV station where she became a caretaker to her father, she ends up receiving the rose and she and Matt spent relaxing onto the hot tub. At the cocktail party, Marylynn gets her one-on-one time with Matt and presents him an orchid. Victoria is soon expected and interrupting Marylynn, in which Victoria was not pleased and called Marylynn a "toxic", as Marylynn is on her defensive side. Marylynn then tried to make peace with Victoria, but Victoria doesn't want to give a word and cutting their communication. At the rose ceremony, Sarah has passed out when she fades on fainting, Bri soon accompanies her to sit her down and the medics are underway, ending with a cliffhanger.
254	3	"Week 3"	January 18, 2021	2503	5.00	1.4
Concluding from the previous episode, Sarah faded out her fainting depression and sat out on a couch and she rejoins the other ladies at the rose ceremony. Alana, Illeana, Kristin, Marylynn and Sydney are sent home. Rachael, Bri, Lauren, Kit, Serena C., Victoria, Khaylah, Anna, Kaili and Katie are taking part for a group date where they meet with Chris and Ashley Iaconetti Haibon to write an erotic novel. Victoria feels a little bad, Sarah is not happy about having to listen to the other ladies about sexual fantasy. Matt goes first to narrate his sexual story, and the ladies soon followed with their skits. Sarah was there to stir her feelings once the date is over and she comes in at the middle of the after party in which she tells Matt to pay attention with the other women and then interrupts Matt's conversation with Katie. Katie herself has to walk back in and continues her time with Matt. And then, Sarah interrupts Katie for a second time before going to leave and apologize to the other women. When the after party turned into a near wreck and Rachael receives the group date rose. Matt then goes to Sarah's room sleeping in her bed and they plan to chat at the other room. Serena P. has the one-on-one date for the week, where they take horseback riding through the lush grounds and have set a picnic together with Matt while the donkey unexpectedly interrupts Matt's shoes. Matt tells Serena P. that he had a pet turtle when he was a child. In the night portion, Serena P. tells her backstory that Matt when she had a serious last relationship lasted for four months before the show. In the end, Matt gave the rose to Serena P. and they spent time at the hot tub. Back at the Chateau Lafayette, when Rachael reads the date card for the upcoming group date, Sarah shows up and even she whispered her emotions, causing to worry with the other ladies. Sarah then apologized to them on how she gate crashed during the group date, thinking that she was planning to go home. The next day, Sarah went crying when she is in her room when Katie comes in and Sarah finally decides to leave. She goes to Matt's "house" to say goodbye, Matt escorts her to a provided SUV upon leaving, ending with another cliffhanger.
255	4	"Week 4"	January 25, 2021	2504	5.25	1.5
Concluded from the previous episode, Jessenia, Chelsea, Mari, Magi, MJ, Pieper and Abigail were called for the group date and they decided straight for the after party instead. Chelsea showed her emotions on being her head clean shaved and showing her photo of her and her mom to Matt, and she ends up receiving the group date rose. At the cocktail party, Chris showed up interrupting Matt's conversation with Victoria as Matt prepares to meet with the new ladies: Brittany, Michelle, Ryan, Kim and Catalina, who is a former Miss Universe Puerto Rico. Victoria soon snatched Catalina's crown to fit on her head. Matt could not handle with the newcomers, and he gets to talk with Victoria outside to finish the conversation. Anna recognized Brittany and they are both from Chicago that either of them are not there for Matt. As soon Matt finally gets one-on-one time with the newcomers. At the rose ceremony, Kaili, Khaylah and Kim are sent home. Mari, Bri, Abigail, Brittany, Ryan, Catalina, Magi, Anna and Victoria are taking part for the group date to meet with Matt and former bachelor Ben Higgins on an obstacle course race entitled "Fall in Love Feast". Where they have to paddle across the lake in a giant pumpkin, then wearing a squirrel costume digging across an acorn into a pile of leaves. Magi is struggled with paddling as she is trailing last. At the after party, Anna gets one-on-one time with Matt, but was soon interrupted by Brittany, causing those ladies are started to rift apart. And then, Anna confronts Brittany for the race of the roses. Bri ends up receiving the group date rose despite without having drama. Michelle gets her one-on-one date where she and Matt have to take part zip line overlooking the Pennsylvanian landscape and they got a bunch of giant balloons containing clues on papers inside. At the night portion, Michelle tells Matt on she got hard in the year because of her students and the surrounding George Floyd protests in her hometown, she does make on her support, and she receives the rose. Katie, Pieper, Serena P., Rachael, Kit, Chelsea, Jessenia, Lauren, Serena C. and MJ are selected for the second group date where they have to take part a boxing match with Mia St. John and have split in two teams of five. Chris and Wells Adams provided the commentary. Lauren and Serena C. are on the final head-to-head in which Lauren beat Serena C. and almost broke the latter's neck. Both teams end up to join for the after party. Rachael gets her quality time first and was soon followed by Pieper. Katie then talks a conversation with Matt and inform about the drama, even she thinks the new girls could ruin their lives, ending in another cliffhanger.
256	5	"Week 5"	February 1, 2021	2505	5.49	1.5
Concluding from the previous episode as it goes for the Week 4 cocktail party, Victoria could not stop within the new ladies as she didn't really like them. Brittany got very mad about the rumors between her and Anna, Matt comes in at the after party and ensuing Anna to talk. Then Matt started a conversation with Anna about her insincere comments with Brittany. Brittany then made a total embarrassment as she did not agree at all. Anna and Brittany started a 2-on-1 talk, and she assures to Matt that she gave Brittany an apology, and Matt sends Anna packing. Victoria later gave Catalina an apology on stealing her crown, and Ryan started crying after had wasted no time causing her intention with Victoria. Victoria started to sob but refused to answer. At the rose ceremony, Catalina, Lauren, Mari and Victoria are sent home. Victoria quickly stared on her emotional exit. Rachael gets the one-on-one date and arrives at small private hall in Nemacolin transformed into a fashion hub Pretty Woman shopping style. Rachael got a massive transformation even wearing different selections of louboutins being as her present until she returns at the Chateau Lafayette. A butler escorts her for a dinner with Matt and quickly learns her backstory to Matt that she has never in love before. Matt gave the rose to Rachael. The group date consist of Serena P., Bri, Katie, Pieper, Serena C., Ryan, Michelle, Brittany, Magi, Abigail, Chelsea, Jessenia and MJ to a farm nearby, where they introduced Ty, who is a farmer. Where they have to take part working on a farm in various challenges: milking a goat and collect eggs from a chicken coop. MJ failed all the challenges as she was very tired on having a group date every week. Pieper then gave Matt a kiss. At the after party, Matt and Chelsea started to chat together even seeing Chelsea worn her coat. Abigail feels a lot insecure on her connection with Matt as she didn't have time in the past few weeks that she learns to Matt when her father left her when she was young. MJ has many personalities in the house stated her conversation against the other women, calling her an "antagonist" that accuses her actions. Then, MJ gave Jessenia an apology and Matt gave Abigail a group date rose. Kit gets the second one-on-one date for the week, where she has to meet Matt at his "house" walking across the Chateau for dinner. Kit is interested with fashion that her mother Cynthia Rowley is well known fashion designer and is very close to her, as they baked chocolate chip cookies for dinner. That ends up Kit received the date rose. Matt presents the card for MJ and Jessenia where they have to meet him at the cocktail party for the showdown. Both ladies started to argue and berate at each other not until Matt shows up. Jessenia knows that MJ lied to Matt about her attitude especially bullying, MJ yelled Jessenia on MJ's inner moral actions, ruining MJ's reputation. Ending on another cliffhanger.
257	6	"Week 6"	February 8, 2021	2506	5.47	1.4
Concluded from the previous episode, MJ and Jessenia left out from the continuation of Week 5 cocktail party, Matt soon arrives to talk with them. MJ started crying when her accusations began to appeal. Matt talks with Jessenia about the rights about bullying as she remains unruffled, Matt made conflicted that either of them could get a rose, and Jessenia got the rose as a result, MJ has sent packing. After a horrible drama, Chris cancels the cocktail party as rose ceremony is about to begin, where Brittany, Magi and Ryan are sent home. Pieper was named for the one-on-one date. Before the start of the date, Serena C. and Katie started to yell and began to frustrate but Katie started to give Serena C. an apology until Katie walks out the room when she reached her inner limit. Katie is too defensive with an argument. Season 23 contestant Heather Martin arrives at Nemacolin even being stopped by a security guard not until Chris Harrison walks in to meet with Heather as he ordered her to go back at the hotel on her quarantine status. Matt stops the SUV to pick up Pieper on her date for a night of fun at the amusement park nearby and she ends up receiving the date rose when a musical appearance by Temecula Road performing a concert for themselves. Bri, Kit, Rachael, Michelle, Jessenia, Serena P., Abigail, Chelsea and Serena C. took part for the group date and have to play bowling at the bowling alley across Nemacolin. Chris announces the teams will divide by two, named "Pink Petals" and "Blue Bombshells". The winning team would have to spend time with Matt, while the losing team would be back at the Chateau. The Pink Petals won, while the Blue Bombshells lost and were ordered to go home but Chris showed up holding an envelope and invited them for the cocktail party. Matt did not have any regrets with the women, and he gave the rose to Michelle. Katie gets the one-on-one date, where Matt introduces her to The Bachelorette season 15 contestant and best friend Tyler Cameron to give Matt an offer. It would consist to punk Tyler at the spa with an actor to play as masseuse. Katie doesn't know the friend is actually Tyler, in which the "masseuse" massaged his back. Then, Katie greets Matt for a dinner as they really don't have a high chemistry and she reveals her backstory that she had a three-year relationship. With no regrets, Matt sends Katie home. Heather has completed her quarantine and drives to a Chateau for a cocktail party, causing the current women are extremely shocked who Heather is. Matt gives a chat with Pieper but he quickly sees Heather entering the Chateau and the ladies quickly learned out that she was from Colton Underwood's season. Ending in another cliffhanger.
258	7	"Week 7"	February 15, 2021	2507	5.51	1.4
Concluded from the previous episode where it left off, Heather from Colton Underwood's season unexpectedly arrives in a middle of party to talk with Matt, told Matt that Heather booked a red eye flight from California to Pennsylvania. Heather then greets the current women as some didn't look familiar and Pieper demands an apology to Heather that she merely interrupted her time with Matt. And Matt asked Heather to leave where he gives an apology to Pieper. At the rose ceremony, Chelsea and Serena C. are sent home. Serena P. gets her second one-on-one date where she has to take a Tantric Yoga session with Matt, where Serena shows her sex-themed yoga positions. Matt gives Serena a smooch. At dinner, Serena feels a little honest on her time with Matt and has received the rose. Pieper, Michelle, Rachael, Bri, Kit and Abigail were named for the final group date of the season that it would head straight for a night of cocktail party. Bri has the first one to talk and tells Matt that she had resign her job prior on to the show, Abigail became much worried nonstop with Matt to use her time and showing her insecurity on a possible future with her potential soulmate, Matt has no deep feelings on Abigail and has sent her home. Kit spends her time with Matt as she is very young to find a man who she needs to finish school and her dream is to travel. Matt gave the rose to Rachael. Shortly after the date, Kit comes in to see Matt knowing that she is not ready to get engaged and has decided to go home. Jessenia gets the final one-on-one date and sent to an empty parking lot. Professional drift racer Tony Angelo, to teach Jessenia and Matt on how to drift. Jessenia is in the driver's seat to do drifting techniques with Matt sit on the passenger side. Then, Matt switches on the driver's side that not bad at all. Jessenia's time with Matt thinking about the potential hometowns where Matt would meet her family that Matt has no connection with romance, and he sends Jessenia packing. At the rose ceremony, Bri and Michelle received their roses and secured for the hometown dates. Pieper is sent home.
259	8	"Week 8: Hometowns"	February 22, 2021	2508	5.40	1.3
Chris tells the women that their families have arrived in Nemacolin for hometowns. First, Michelle's "hometown" theme to take Matt on a bike ride at the Lecture Hall. Where they see a bunch of large projector screen to see Michelle's students from Woodbury, Minnesota on a virtual class via Zoom. Then, Michelle introduces Matt to her mom LaVonne and her dad Ephraim and they are very supportive on her. Ephraim gives her on a chat that he is little worried about the other women, Matt then talks with Ephraim on his plan to move to Minnesota if he would choose Michelle. Then, Michelle shows a more emotional to her mom with no judgment that Michelle would give Matt a trust. Afterwards, Michelle plays basketball with Matt and her parents. Next, Rachael surprises Matt on an empty airfield where Rachael drives the convertible and Matt blindfolds to hear the communication, they have to take part on a skydiving seeing a professional skydiver jumps down on a runway with a parachute. The two are ready to view the Pennsylvania countryside especially Nemacolin. Then, Matt meets Rachael's family that her father Darrell thinks Rachael is ready to get proposed when he talked with Matt preaching on Matt's future with Rachael knowing that Matt learns an excellent conversation with Rachael's father. But Rachael did not have to make love if her father would approve to give a relationship. Then, Bri rides on an all-terrain vehicle with Matt on a bumpy ride. Unlike her first date with Matt, the vehicle did not flip and they proceed on a middle of field where they have set up a picnic along with horses. When Bri introduces Matt to her family, she could not believe that her mother had recently gave birth a baby girl and Bri would be excited to meet her sister for the first time. Bri's mom Lauren gets one-on-one talk with Matt that if Bri is in love with Matt which he could handle the family's response. Bri then talks with her mom to profess on her feelings with Matt, ending their time. The last "hometown" is Serena P. where Matt shows products and related items from Canada at the bar and grill filled with Canadian flag, maple syrup, moose on a taxidermy and a map of Canada. Serena gives Matt a quiz about Canada and even tried some Canadian delicacies such as poutine, peameal bacon and various pastries. Then, they arrived on an ice hockey field where Serena shows Matt to play ice hockey. Then, Serena brings Matt to meet her family especially her sister Talia, who is very close to her. When Serena gets a talk with her father, admitting that she is not sure on a potential relationship with Matt. Serena's mother Rasna thinks that Serena could not marry Matt to trust her feelings that she didn't give any engagement stuff. Matt sits down with Chris where they have to talk, Matt comes in to see Serena on her room that Serena is not ready to love as she did not have mixed feelings and Serena starts crying on her tears, ending her dreams on the show. At the rose ceremony, Michelle, Rachael and Bri have each received roses.
260	9	"The Women Tell All"	March 1, 2021	N/A	4.69	1.1
The changes between the special where host Chris Harrison would temporarily leave from the show due to racial controversy. Fifteen of thirty-four eliminated contestants were present sitting on the audience despite taking place at the near empty chairs. Some of the women reappeared with their rivalry, especially Katie and Victoria, and MJ and Jessenia. MJ and Jessenia remain their biggest problems about MJ's bullying accusation. Mari tries to defend MJ against her actions with no circumstances. Ryan did not enjoy her time with Matt when she was competing and Victoria gives consequence on her in-camera behavior. Victoria then soon apologized to the women, especially Katie. Chelsea did not appreciate with the women during her time at the house until Mari agreed her statement about Sarah's sudden departure earlier in the season. Katie then tried to give her defensive opinion and Khaylah was to speak up with no answer given. Brittany gives her address when she confronted her time at the show against her rivalry with Anna, Chris then gave a talk to Anna about what happened as she was not truly satisfied on the rumors. Brittany said that she was not looking for Anna's life or her hurtful feelings to be more better. There were portions of dates completely edited out from the broadcast including What's In a Box challenge from the intended group date from Week 7, contestants eating pancakes from the Fall in Love Feast group date from Week 4, and drinking egg yolk from the Boxing Match date also from Week 4. Katie was on a hot seat telling about her journey with Matt as learned that she had zero chemistry, Abigail and Pieper were next as Abigail acknowledged her worst mistake that Matt sent her home in Week 7, clarifying she is not a member of the capital-D Deaf community and seeing the Tweet from the screen. Pieper then admitted as she was in love with Matt but was afraid to tell the truth, stated her journey was not a right choice for her. Serena P. then opened up her hot seat when she was not for the perfect reason to find love. Matt appears on a stage with a long beard, he learns from Chris about Rachael's photos from 2018 attended an Antebellum South party. Victoria then gives her time with Matt when she hurt her feelings on her behavior and Matt then apologizes her criticizing her offensive manner. Bloopers are shown including former bachelorette JoJo Fletcher made her cameo appearance presenting a dish for Matt and Serena P.'s date.
261	10	"Week 9: Fantasy Suites"	March 8, 2021	2509	5.08	1.3
Matt's estranged father Manny arrives to see him visiting at the "house" and they started to talk, Matt felt with no connection against his father that he hadn't seen since childhood, explaining how on his relationship with the three women and thinking his future that he would want to start a family. Manny then acknowledges Matt that he lost his own father in a young age and knowing about Matt's past. Manny gives his emotional with Matt and agreed Matt's decisions before he was preparing to leave. Michelle gets her first date and has to meet with Matt for a "Pennsylvania Dutch spa day" contains a bath filled with oatmeal milk, butter, bear made out of taxidermy and grain of oats. They get a shower as the two lay down on a fur rugs. Michelle explains Matt on a potential relationship that could start a better future, and would spend time with kids. Bri goes next for her date, where she sees Matt to spend their day at Pennsylvania woods to set up a tent for a camping adventure. Matt then tells Bri about his relationship with his father earlier on, Bri then gets emotional on her strain relationship with her own father. Rachael stands in to meet with Matt for her date to take part for pottery class. They would have to learn pottery from ceramist Lauren to make beautifully crafted ceramics. Then, Rachael steps away from the pottery class to think about her relationship with Matt especially on her future. Rachael and Matt later do crafting all by themselves with metamorphic fireworks are on display from the window. All three ladies received their fantasy suite invitations at the end of each date. At the rose ceremony, Matt gives the roses to Michelle and Rachael, and eliminating Bri, who left her heartbroken.
262	11	"Week 10: Season Finale"	March 15, 2021	2510	6.07	1.5
The final two ladies, Michelle and Rachael, have their opportunity to introduce them to Matt's family (his older brother John and his mother Patty) at Nemacolin. Michelle comes in first to meet the family despite having a good conversation with the potential in-laws especially on his feelings with Michelle and Matt's mother became more emotional on her. Then, Rachael is next to overhear the conversation with Matt's family like they brought an upward moment during their overnight date. Matt's brother goes to talk with Rachael as she admitted that she has ever been in love. Matt's family gave a seal of approval for both women. The next day, Chris Harrison visits Matt at his "house" to give therapy talk, as Chris takes on Matt's tearful doubts like having a good relationship with his mom. Chris then leaves. Michelle's final date takes rappeling down the building and until they reached at one of the rooms where they gave presents including a shirt for themselves which have "Mr. James" and "Mrs. James" jerseys at the back on the shirt. Matt then gives a talk with Michelle to hear the conversation as Michelle felt a little distress that she is not the right choice for love and Matt gave her a final goodbye. Then, he meets up with Chris to give him counseling and he tells Matt showing his faded time. The next day, Chris comes in to surprise Rachael on what would be her final date and told her that the date is going to be cancelled, he brought an envelope instead. Rachael then reads a note from Matt to meet him at the lake for the proposal. When Rachael arrives at the final rose ceremony location, Matt did not propose to her and gives her a final rose.
263	12	"After the Final Rose"	March 15, 2021	N/A	5.64	1.4
In the wake on the scandal involved host Chris Harrison earlier in the season, Emmanuel Acho had to sit in place of Chris, hosting this special recapping events on the finale. Michelle is the first one in the hot seat explaining on her breakup with Matt, and Emmanuel asked her on Rachael's Antebellum South themed party when she shows the picture that she felt a little hard on the reaction. Matt meets with Michelle for the first time since he eliminated her in Pennsylvania, explains with the heated conversation and soon he apologized Michelle about their bad encounters. Emmanuel had told to viewers about racism and diversity addressing his validity with person of color cast members. Matt didn't say any regrets on days after the filming ended, showing a picture of him and Rachael in the pre-honeymoon period as they spent more time together. Matt soon recognizes Rachael might not understand on racism issues, Matt then admits on his true feelings with Rachael that she did not go away. Rachael then shows her picture from Antebellum South party and she addresses about racism and explained that she did not give a risk on the party. Rachael soon accepts her plea. Matt reunites with Rachael for the first time, Matt felt hard on how the relationship with Rachael could try to work hard and Matt started crying. Emmanuel then asked Matt on a probable reconciliation with Rachael on the future that he tells Rachael to do work on her own. Rachael then soon apologizes Matt on her tears and assures Matt could be the best for her. Shortly after, Emmanuel announced that Katie and Michelle will become the 17th and 18th bachelorette respectively.

== Controversy ==
Contestant Rachael Kirkconnell faced controversy in February 2021 after she was accused of liking racist social media posts and bullying a girl for dating African-American men in high school. Photos also emerged of Kirkconnell attending an Antebellum South plantation themed fraternity formal in 2018. Kirkconnell later issued an apology for her past behavior.

Host Chris Harrison was criticized for his defense of Kirkconnell after he claimed that "50 million people [attended an Antebellum South ball] in 2018," and "the woke police is out there." He later issued an apology for his comments. A petition to remove Harrison as host of the franchise garnered over 40,000 signatures. On February 13, 2021, Harrison announced that he would be "stepping aside for a period of time" and would not host the After the Final Rose special. On June 8, 2021, it was revealed Harrison would leave the franchise for good.

On February 27, 2021, Emmanuel Acho was selected as the replacement host for After the Final Rose. Acho is the author of the New York Times bestseller Uncomfortable Conversations with a Black Man.
