= Sanderson High School (North Carolina) =

High school in Raleigh, North Carolina

Jesse O. Sanderson High School

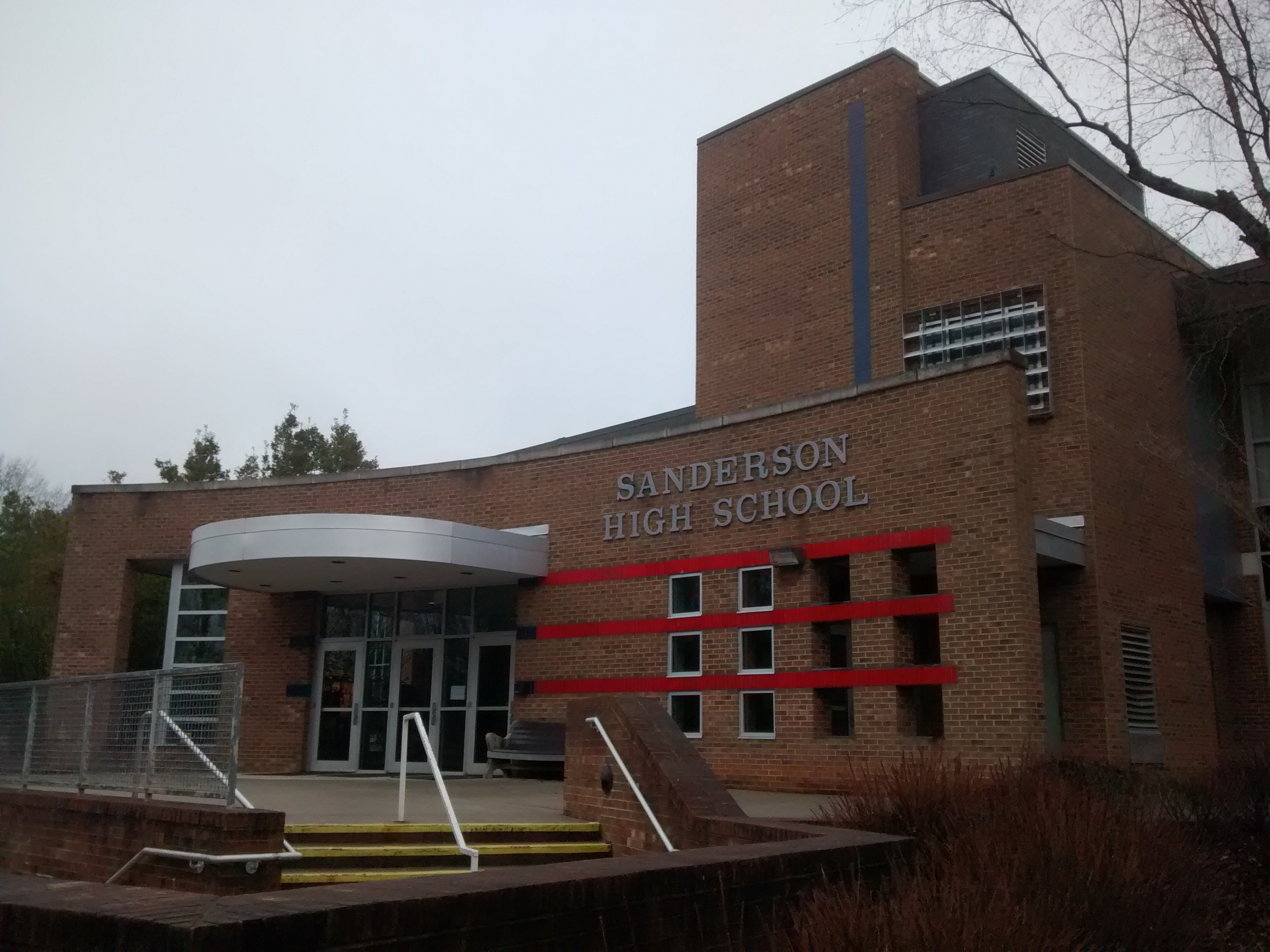
- Sanderson High School, December 2014

Location
- 5500 Dixon Drive; Raleigh, North Carolina 27609; United States; 35°51′38″N 78°38′49″W

Information
- Founded: 1968 (58 years ago)
- CEEB code: 343213
- Principal: Tara Drouhard
- Teaching staff: 91.05 (FTE)
- Enrollment: 1,648 (2024–2025)
- Student to teacher ratio: 18.10
- Schedule type: 2x4 Block
- Colors: Royal blue, scarlet, and white
- Mascot: Spartan
- Yearbook: The Lakonikos
- Website: Sanderson High School

Jesse O. Sanderson High School (commonly known as Sanderson High School), is a co-educational 9–12 public high school located in Raleigh, North Carolina, United States in the Wake County Public School System. The school was founded in 1968. It is named after a former superintendent of Raleigh public schools, Jesse O. Sanderson. Sanderson runs on a 2x4 block schedule; it was one of the first schools in the area to do so. It is known for its performing arts, athletic, and community outreach programs.

== Clubs ==
Sanderson's student government has received recognition for their participation in the Sanderson community. It is one of the only four high schools in the state and 131 in the country to earn the National Association of Student Councils Gold Council of Excellence in 2010.

== Performing arts ==
Sanderson Theatre Ensemble In 2018, Sanderson High School performed the play “26 Pebbles” by Eric Ulloa, a play about the Sandy Hook shooting, for the North Carolina Theatre Conference.

Sanderson Sandpipers The current director of the Sanderson Sandpipers is Sarah Rhodes. Former director Marshall Butler jr. has been recognized as an outstanding music educator by the North Carolina Symphony Orchestra. Marshall Butler retired at the end of the 2015–16 school year, having served from 1992-2016.

== Athletics ==
Sanderson Spartans
- School: Jesse O. Sanderson High School
- Nickname: Spartans
- NCHSAA: Class 7A
- Conference: Triangle Six 6A/7A
- Location: Raleigh, NC
- Colors: Royal Blue, Scarlet, and White
- Website: Sanderson Athletics Dept.

=== Cheerleading ===
Sanderson's cheerleading squad were the 2005 NCHSAA Super Varsity state invitational champions and 2005 Carolina Cup champions.

=== Men's Cross Country ===
Sanderson's men's cross-country team won the 2009 NCHSAA 4A state championship.

=== Men's Soccer ===
Sanderson's men's soccer team has won eleven NCHSAA soccer state championships. They also once held the national record for most consecutive games without a loss at 103, which is still the state record. Since the early 1980s, they have also produced a number of Division 1 players.

=== Women's Soccer ===
Sanderson's women's soccer team were the 1991 NCHSAA state champions.

=== Men's Swimming ===
The men's swim team has won four NCHSAA state championships.

=== Women's Swimming ===
The women's swim team has won five NCHSAA state championships.

=== Volleyball ===
Sanderson volleyball was won two NCHSAA state championships.

=== Wrestling ===
The wrestling team won the 1983 NCHSAA state tournament championship.

== Administration ==
As of January 2023, Tara Drouhard is the principal of Sanderson High School.Prior to that, Gretta Dula served as principal, following Gregory Decker who served as the school's principal for over ten years, and was credited with raising the schools graduation rates while principal. Catty Moore, Decker's predecessor, served in the position for seven years between 2000 and 2008, and would later go on to become the superintendent of the Wake County Public School System in 2018.

Year	Graduation Rate	+/-
2006	78.6%	N/A
2007	76.1%	-2.5
2008	77.5%	+1.4
2009	76.7%	-0.8
2010	75%	-1.7
2011	77.5%	+2.7
2012	78.6%	+1.1
2013	78.2%	-0.4
2014	82.8%	+4.6
2015	81.4%	-1.4
2016	89.1%	+7.7
2017	86.9%	-2.2
2018	84.5%	-2.4
2019	86.0%	+1.5
2020	87.3%	+1.3
2021	88.7%	+1.4
2022	81.7%	-7.0
2023	82.9%	+1.2

== Demographic & economic background ==
Race	Number of Students	Percentage
American Indian	4	0.02%
Asian	63	3.1%
Black	505	25.5%
Hispanic	310	15.7%
Native Hawaiian or Pacific Islands	5	0.02%
Two or More	55	2.7%
White	1031	52.2%
Total (2015–16)	1973	100%

As of 2012, 28% of the students receive free lunch, 4% receive reduced-price lunch, and 68% receive no lunch benefits.

== Notable alumni ==
- Tom Fetzer (1973), former Mayor of Raleigh and former chair of the North Carolina Republican Party
- Steve Dobrogosz (1974), pianist and composer
- Steve Kenney (1974), NFL player for the Philadelphia Eagles; Offensive linesman at Clemson University
- David Sedaris (1975), noted author and humorist
- Jeb Bishop, American jazz trombone player
- Amy Sedaris (1980), author, humorist and actress; creator and star of the "Strangers with Candy" television series on Comedy Central and the 2006 major motion picture release of the same title
- Jeff Williams (1981), Chief Operating Officer of Apple Inc
- Paul Friedrich (1985), cartoon artist
- Clark Brisson (1987), All-American soccer player at the University of South Carolina; Played eight years in the National Professional Soccer League; Currently assistant coach at the University of New Haven
- Melanie Wade Goodwin (1988), member of the North Carolina General Assembly
- David Fox (1989), swimmer at North Carolina State University; 1996 Olympic gold medalist in men's 4x100 metre relay
- Caleb Norkus (1997), former professional soccer player who played for such teams as The Carolina Railhawks, Richmond Kickers, and Puerto Rico Islanders; also played for the U.S men's national team in 1995
- Darryl Partin (2006), former professional basketball player
- Annie E. Clark (2007), women's and civil rights activist
- Matt James (2010), former college football player for the Wake Forest Demon Deacons and the first black Bachelor lead on season 25 of The Bachelor
- Ryan Jeffers (2015), MLB player for the Minnesota Twins
- Alim McNeill (2018), NFL defensive tackle for the Detroit Lions
