= Paul Friedrich =

Paul Friedrich may refer to:

- Paul Friedrich (linguist) (1927–2016), American linguist, anthropologist and professor at the University of Chicago
- Paul Friedrich (comic artist) (born before 2007), comic artist
- Paul Frederick, Grand Duke of Mecklenburg-Schwerin (1800–1842), Grand Duke of Mecklenburg-Schwerin
- Paul Leopold Friedrich (1864–1916), German surgeon and bacteriologist

== See also ==
- Paul Friedrichs (1940–2012), East German professional motocross racer
