= Ryan Hoag =

American gridiron football player (born 1979)

No. 18, 7
- Position: Wide receiver

Personal information
- Born: November 23, 1979 (age 46); Minneapolis, Minnesota, U.S.
- Listed height: 6 ft 2 in (1.88 m)
- Listed weight: 200 lb (91 kg)

Career information
- High school: Minneapolis (MN) Washburn
- College: Gustavus Adolphus
- NFL draft: 2003: 7th round, 262nd overall pick

Career history
- Oakland Raiders (2003)*; New York Giants (2003–2004)*; Minnesota Vikings (2004–2006); Washington Redskins (2006–2007)*; Berlin Thunder (2007); Edmonton Eskimos (2007)*; Jacksonville Jaguars (2008)*; New York Sentinels (2009); Omaha Nighthawks (2010)*
- * Offseason or practice squad member only

Awards and highlights
- 2× First-team All-MIAC (2001, 2002)

Ryan Scott Hoag (born November 23, 1979) is an American former football wide receiver. He was selected by the Oakland Raiders with the final pick in the 2003 NFL draft, earning him the title of Mr. Irrelevant. He never played in a regular season game. He played college football at Gustavus Adolphus.

Hoag was also a member of the New York Giants, Minnesota Vikings, Washington Redskins, Berlin Thunder, Edmonton Eskimos, Jacksonville Jaguars, New York Sentinels and Omaha Nighthawks. Hoag formally worked as a teaching artist for Upstream Arts as well as the head varsity tennis coach at his alma mater, Washburn High School in Minneapolis, Minnesota. He currently resides in Newport Beach, California and works as a sports broadcaster most notably on the pre pregame show for the Las Vegas Raiders.

== Early life ==
Hoag was born in Minneapolis, Minnesota, and attended Washburn High School. Hoag lettered in football, basketball, soccer, and tennis and was twice named the captain in tennis, as well as an all-conference honoree in soccer.

== College career ==
He began his college career as a walk-on soccer player at Wake Forest University.

He attended Division III Gustavus Adolphus College in St. Peter, Minnesota. He left Gustavus with 144 receptions for 2,232 yards (15.5 average) and 29 touchdowns. He was the only Gustavus player with over 2,000 career receiving yards and was an All-MIAC 1st-team selection as a junior and senior as well as being named Gustavus Male Athlete of the Year as a senior. He caught 56 passes for 808 yards (14.4 avg.) and ten touchdowns as a senior, and also returned 13 kickoffs for 397 yards (30.5 avg.). He set a school record with 13 catches for 175 yards, and achieving 313 total yards (175 receiving, 122 kickoff return, four punt return and 12 rushing). As a junior, Hoag pulled in 54 passes for 876 yards (16.2 avg.) and set a Gustavus record with 14 touchdowns. He also caught 34 passes for 548 yards (16.1 avg.) and five touchdowns as a sophomore.

He took 3rd at 2002 NCAA Division III Outdoor Track and Field Championships in the 100-meter dash with a time of 10.51 and 4th at the 2003 Indoor Championships in the 55-meter dash at 6.45.

== Professional career ==
=== Oakland Raiders ===
Hoag was drafted 262nd overall in the NFL draft by the Oakland Raiders in 2003.

=== New York Giants ===
Hoag signed to the New York Giants' practice squad on November 19, 2003, and was released by New York on May 20, 2004.

=== Minnesota Vikings ===
Hoag was signed by the Minnesota Vikings on June 24, 2004, and spent three weeks of the 2004 season on the active roster in Minnesota, but was not activated for any of those three games. He spent the other 14 weeks on the practice squad before being released on September 3, 2005. He signed a third time on April 5, 2006, and was finally released by Minnesota on September 2, 2006.

=== Washington Redskins ===
Hoag was signed by Washington to the practice squad on November 22, 2006, and released by Washington on November 28, 2006. Hoag re-signed to the Redskins' practice squad on December 27, 2006, and was commissioned to the Berlin Thunder of the now defunct NFL Europa league where his playing opportunities were scarce.

In 2007, Hoag spent training camp with the Redskins. He was rumored to be a contender for the final 53-man roster, but was released on September 1 as part of the team's final roster cuts.

=== Edmonton Eskimos ===
On September 11, 2007, Hoag signed a practice roster agreement with the Edmonton Eskimos of Canadian Football League. On October 3, 2007, he was released from their practice squad.

=== Jacksonville Jaguars ===
On July 25, 2008, Hoag was signed by the Jacksonville Jaguars. In two preseason games, Hoag caught five passes for 98 yards, including a 53-yard reception in Jacksonville's preseason opener against the Miami Dolphins. He was released by the Jaguars on August 30, 2008, when the team made their final cuts.

=== New York Sentinels ===
Hoag was drafted by the New York Sentinels of the United Football League in the UFL Premiere Season Draft. He signed with the team on August 5, 2009.

== The Bachelorette ==
Hoag was a contestant on season four the ABC reality television dating show The Bachelorette, which premiered May 19, 2008. On the debut episode, he said he was a virgin, explaining, "Christianity is first and foremost in my life. [...] I don't have sex. I'm not going to do that until I'm married. So I have wondered about DeAnna in terms of how she'll deal with the fact that I'm a virgin. I don't know how she'll deal with the fact that I hold faith as the number one thing in my life." On the May 26, 2008, episode, Hoag was eliminated when he did not receive a rose. He also participated in the third season of The Bachelor Pad, which began on July 23, 2012, and he was voted off the following week on July 30, 2012.

== The Floor ==
Hoag was a contestant on season two of the Fox Broadcasting Company game show The Floor, which premiered September 25, 2024. He was the fourth overall contestant of the season to engage in one of the show's head-to-head duels and was able to defend his category of "Tailgating" in his debut. He held the most territory at the end of the first episode with four spaces and won the first $20,000 prize of the season. He was challenged during the second episode and had to defend his acquired category of "Cleaning Brands", but was unable to do so and was eliminated.
