= Rachael Kirkconnell =

American television personality (born 1996)

- Born: September 26, 1996 (age 30); Cumming, Georgia, U.S.
- Education: Georgia College & State University
- Television: The Bachelor

Rachael Kirkconnell (born September 26, 1996) is an American television personality, who is best known as the winner of season 25 of The Bachelor.

== Early life and education ==
Kirkconnell was born and raised in Cumming, Georgia to parents Darrell and Kim Kirkconnell. She has a sister, Trinity, and a brother, Greyson. She graduated from West Forsyth High School in 2015, and then from Georgia College & State University in 2019 with a degree in marketing. While in college, she was a member of Alpha Delta Pi.

Prior to appearing on The Bachelor, Kirkconnell was working as a graphic designer in Atlanta, Georgia.

== The Bachelor ==
Kirkconnell was a contestant on Matt James' season of The Bachelor. James, who was the first African American male lead in the show's history, chose her over fellow finalist Michelle Young. However, he did not propose.

During the live After the Final Rose special in March 2021, it was revealed that James had made the decision to end his relationship with Kirkconnell after her racially insensitive past was brought to light.

=== Racism controversy ===
While James' season was airing, Kirkconnell came under fire after she was accused of several racist actions, including liking racist social media posts and bullying girls in high school for their dating preferences. James was forced to address these allegations after a photo of Kirkconnell attending an Antebellum South plantation-themed fraternity formal in 2018 went viral.

In February 2021, Kirkconnell issued a public apology for her past behavior, calling her actions "ignorant and racist" and pleaded with people not to defend her.

== Personal life ==
Kirkconnell and James broke up while their season was airing, but got back together in April 2021. They broke up again in January 2025, with Kirkconnell appearing on an episode of the podcast Call Her Daddy to discuss their split.

Awards and achievements
Preceded by Hannah Ann Sluss	The Bachelor winner Season 25	Succeeded by Susie Evans
