= Michelle Young (television personality) =

American television personality (born 1993)

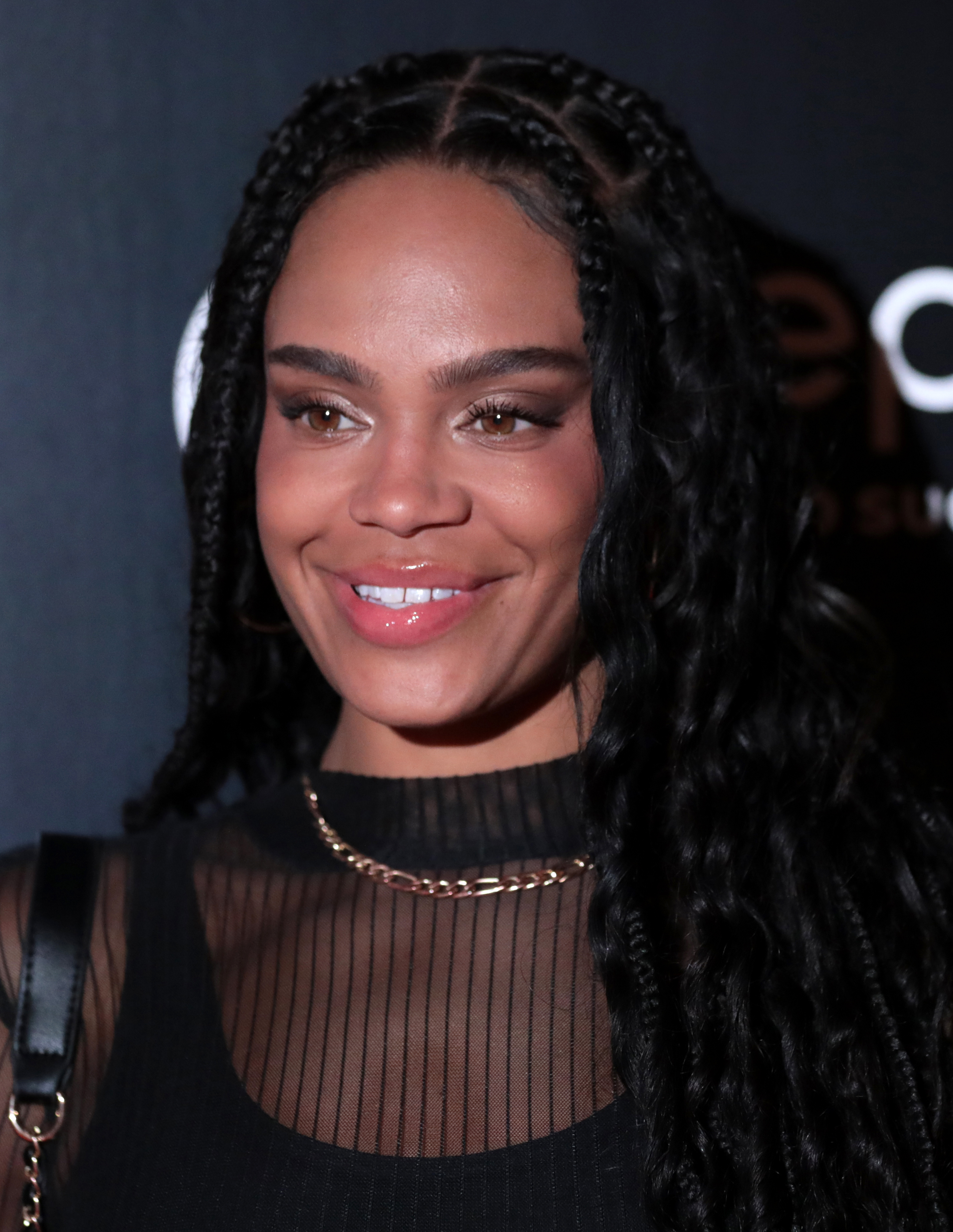
- Young in 2023
- Born: June 3, 1993 (age 33); St. Louis Park, Minnesota, U.S.
- Education: Bradley University
- Occupation: Television personality
- Television: The Bachelor; The Bachelorette
- Height: 5 ft 9 in (1.75 m)
- Spouse: Jack Leius (m. 2025)
- Partner: Nayte Olukoya (2021–2022)

Michelle Anne Young (born June 3, 1993) is an American television personality. She received national recognition as the runner-up on season 25 of The Bachelor, and as the star of season 18 of The Bachelorette.

== Early life and education ==
Young was born in St. Louis Park, Minnesota to parents LaVonne and Ephraim Young, and was raised in nearby Woodbury. She has two siblings, Angela and Alex. She was a star basketball player at Woodbury High School, and played Division I basketball at Bradley University on an athletic scholarship. She graduated from Bradley in 2015 with a degree in elementary education.

== Television career ==
=== The Bachelor ===
Young first appeared as a contestant on Matt James' season of The Bachelor. She entered in the third week of the competition, where she made it to the final two but was rejected in favor of fellow contestant Rachael Kirkconnell.

=== The Bachelorette ===
Young and Katie Thurston were announced as the leads of consecutive seasons of The Bachelorette on March 15, 2021, during the Bachelor season 25 "After the Final Rose" special.

=== Bachelor Happy Hour ===
Young was announced as the new co-host on Bachelor Happy Hour with Becca Kufrin in March 2022.

== Personal life ==
Outside of her appearances on The Bachelor franchise, Young works as a fifth grade teacher at Echo Park Elementary School in Burnsville, Minnesota. She was previously employed as a fifth grade teacher at Normandale Hills Elementary School in Bloomington.

On September 9, 2021, Young got engaged to Nayte Olukoya, whom she chose as the winner on her season of The Bachelorette. They announced their breakup on June 17, 2022.

On October 27, 2023, Young announced she was dating Jack Leius in an Instagram post. They got engaged in October 2024. They got married on June 7, 2025 at Woodland Glasshaus at Bavaria Downs in Chaska, Minnesota.

== Filmography ==
Year	Title	Role	Notes
2021–2022	The Bachelor	Herself	Runner-up; season 25, Guest appearance; season 26
2021	Good Morning America	Herself	3 episodes
2021	Live with Kelly and Ryan	Herself	October 19 episode
2021	The Bachelorette	Herself	Lead, season 18
2021	Entertainment Tonight	Herself	November 23 episode
2021	Extra	Herself	November 23 episode
2021	Jimmy Kimmel Live!	Herself	November 23 episode
2021	American Music Awards of 2021	Herself	Presenter
2022	Celebrity Family Feud	Herself	Contestant, one episode

Preceded by Madison Prewett	The Bachelor runner up Season 25	Succeeded by Rachel Recchia & Gabby Windey
Preceded by Katie Thurston	The Bachelorette; Season 18	Succeeded by Rachel Recchia & Gabby Windey
