= Catty Moore =

Member of the North Carolina State Board of Education

At-large member of the North Carolina State Board of Education
- Incumbent
- Assumed office October 9, 2023

Superintendent of the Wake County Public School System
- In office May 23, 2018 – June 30, 2023
- Preceded by: Del Burns (interim)
- Succeeded by: Robert Taylor

Deputy Superintendent for Academic Advancement of WCPSS
- In office September 2011 – May 23, 2018

Personal details
- Education: North Carolina State University (B.A.); University of North Carolina (M.A.)
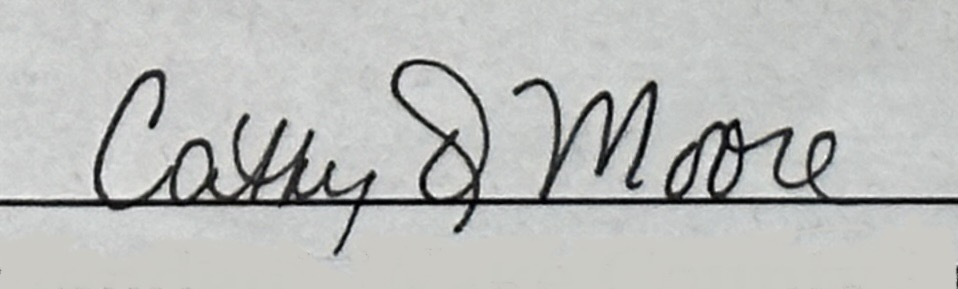
- Signature

Catty Moore (née Quiroz, previously known as Cathy Moore) is a member of the North Carolina State Board of Education. She previously served as superintendent of the Wake County Public School System, from 2018 to 2023.

Moore worked in the public education field for three decades prior to becoming superintendent, serving as a teacher, principal, and deputy superintendent. Starting in May 2018, Moore used her position as superintendent to expand the magnet school program, pass policy promoting equity, and negotiate several bonds and funding increases for the school system. Moore retired from the superintendent position on July 1, 2023, and was appointed to the State Board of Education in October 2023.

== Early life and education ==
Moore earned a bachelor's degree in French language and literature from North Carolina State University, and, in 1997, a master's degree of school administration from the University of North Carolina. Near the time of her retirement in 2023, Moore was working towards earning a doctoral degree from East Carolina University.

== Career ==
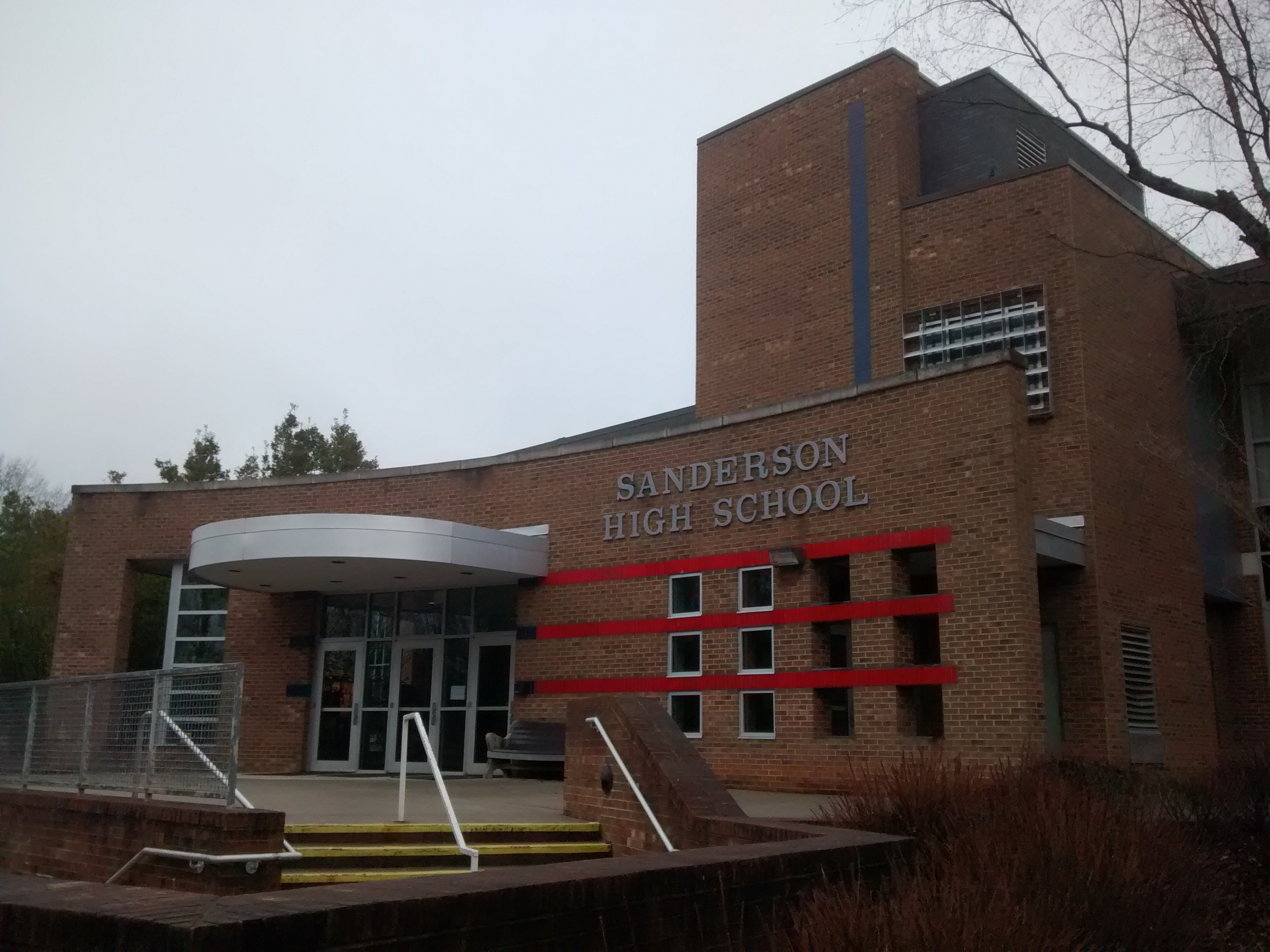
Sanderson High School, where Moore was principal from 2000 to 2008

For three decades prior to becoming superintendent, Moore worked in multiple positions relating to public education. Moore began her education career as a high school teacher from 1988 to 1995, first as a French teacher in the Nash-Rocky Mount Public School System. Moore then moved to Wake County to continue to work as a foreign language teacher at Enloe High School, before becoming the assistant principal of the school, and later Apex High School between 1997 and 2000. From 2000 to 2008, Moore was the principal of Sanderson High School in Raleigh, before becoming a superintendent.

=== Superintendent career ===
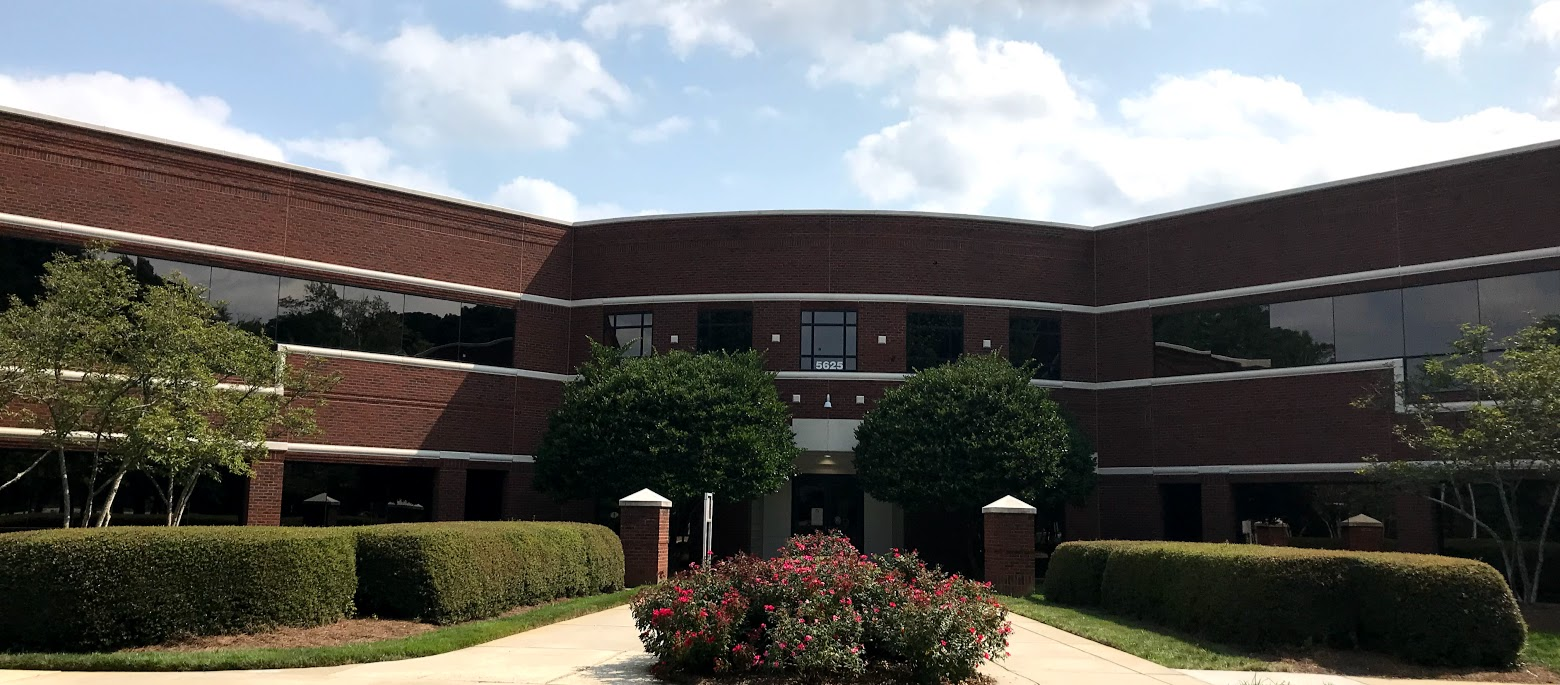
The main office of Wake County Public School Systems, in which Moore became superintendent of.

Moore became an area superintendent for the central region of Wake County in 2008, before becoming Deputy Superintendent for Academic Advancement for the Wake County Public School System in September 2011. Moore served in this position for the next seven years, where she most notably worked to improve and expand the programming of magnet schools in the school system. For a short period of time in 2012, Moore served as the interim superintendent.

On May 23, 2018, Moore replaced retiring superintendent Jim Merrill's interim Del Burns in a unanimous vote as the Wake County Public School System's 10th superintendent, becoming the first woman and first Latina to serve in the role. The screening process, which began in December 2017, was reviewed by the North Carolina School Boards Association who narrowed the pool to 20 applicants spanning across ten states. Moore was ultimately chosen for her previous work as deputy superintendent and for being a native of the state. Despite immediately facing budgetary and growth challenges, Moore as superintendent most notably wrote the district's first equity policy, proposed two new bonds worth approximately $1.1 billion for schools, and successfully negotiated several funding and raise increases for the school system and its employees, mainly in 2018 and 2019 before the COVID-19 pandemic.

==== COVID-19 response (2020–2021) ====
Moore was a strong believer in virtual education upon the outbreak of the COVID-19 pandemic in the state, launching a school system wide "Virtual Academy" serving 85,000 students while in-person teaching was viewed as unsafe by the state and the general community. By July 2020, Moore supported the so-called "Plan B" as a first attempt to return to normal schooling during the pandemic. The plan, which saw students in the school system divided into three groups, each spending "one week in class at school and two weeks at home with online instruction", was eventually implemented under her approval. By November 2020, Moore doubled-down on her support for Plan B rotations, and approved of periodic leadership team visits to schools to check on their progress in implementing anti-COVID protocol. Moore also organized school board sessions to discuss partially continuing online learning as the plan called for. In February 2021, Moore expressed her stance supporting the necessity of teacher vaccinations, mask wearing, and social distancing within the classrooms as more students continued to return to in-person teaching. By the time Moore's contract as superintendent went up for vote to extend again in November 2021, only a minority of concerns were raised against her leadership during the pandemic, with the majority approving of her handling of the situation, allowing Moore to be re-appointed in a vote of 8–1.

==== Post-pandemic and retirement (2022–2023) ====
In April 2022, Moore was among those part of the unanimous vote which made women's wrestling an official sport for high schools in the school system and state as a whole, something she had previously advocated for. Moore attributed the "historic moment" to the gradual introduction of the sport throughout previous years. Moore, also in April, proposed a $56 million budget increase to WCPSS with the goal to help prevent against growing staffing concerns by helping raise employee pay, hire more employees, and fund the construction of four new schools.

In October 2022, Moore, who had gone by "Cathy" before this point, agreed to extend her contract another year in the position under her given Hispanic name "Catty," after mentioning her desire to do so in a school board meeting a month prior.

On February 9, 2023, Moore announced she would retire from her position at the end of the school year effective on July 1. While Moore accomplished much of what she set out to do when taking on the job in regards to raising funding and promoting equity, WRAL cited unresolved staffing issues in classrooms and on buses, and general school safety concerns, as unresolved matters from her tenureship were left for the next superintendent to address. On October 1, 2023, Robert Taylor was sworn in as the next superintendent.

==== Post-retirement (2023–) ====
On October 9, 2023, Moore was appointed to an at-large seat on the State Board of Education by governor Roy Cooper after the previous seatholder, James Ford, vacated their position a month prior. On February 8, 2024, Moore assumed the position of interim superintendent of Durham Public Schools. Moore was appointed temporarily to replace the previous schools superintendent, Dr. Pascal Mubenga, who resigned the day prior amid a series of staff 'sick-outs' over pay. Moore's decision to take on the position was supported by other members of the education chair in Durham Public Schools. On June 2, 2025, Moore was sworn in as the Interim Superintendent of Winston-Salem/Forsyth County Schools.

== Awards and recognition ==
Moore has won four notable awards for her work in education. On October 25, 2007, WCPSS named Moore the school system's 2007 Principal of the Year for her work in the position at Sanderson High School. On January 25, 2008, Moore was selected as the Regional Principal of the Year by the state Department of Public Instruction, which saw $1,500 be awarded to her and Sanderson High. On May 27, 2021, Moore received her first award as superintendent, where she was named the Superintendent of the Year by the North Carolina PTA for her "steady and focused leadership" throughout the COVID-19 pandemic in the school system. Finally on April 20, 2022, Moore was named the National Superintendent of the Year by Magnet Schools of America. In the letter of recommendation written by a former principal who worked closely with Moore, she was regarded as "a champion for all that magnets represent […] giving every child every opportunity to succeed in the most innovative, rigorous, caring, and creative school environments."

At the announcement of her retirement, Moore was regarded as "tough to follow" by a board chairwoman in an interview, following the October 2022 school board vote to keep Moore in her superintendent position, which ended in a vote of 8–1.

Educational offices
| Preceded by Del Burns (interim) | Superintendent of the Wake County Public School System; 2018 – 2023 | Succeeded by Robert Taylor |
| Unknown | Deputy Superintendent for Academic Advancement of the Wake County Public School System; 2011 – 2018 | Unknown |
| Unknown | Area superintendent for the central region of Wake County; 2008 – 2011 | Unknown |
