= Lauren Zima =

American entertainment reporter

- Born: November 30, 1987 (age 38); Elgin, Illinois, U.S.
- Education: University of Missouri (BJ)
- Occupations: Television personality; Entertainment reporter; Television producer
- Years active: 2008–present
- Spouse: Chris Harrison (m. 2023)

Lauren Zima (born November 30, 1987) is an American television personality, entertainment reporter, and television producer. She is a senior producer and host at Entertainment Tonight.

== Early life ==
Zima was raised in Elgin, Illinois, graduated from Elgin High School, and studied journalism at the University of Missouri.

== Career ==
In 2011, Zima appeared on MTV's Disaster Date. She was hired by Entertainment Tonight in 2015 after a brief stint at Newsy, where she served as a creative director and host. Currently, her coverage for Entertainment Tonight includes hosting The Bachelor: Roses and Rosé, a comedic recap show that is available on YouTube.

== Personal life ==
As of 2018, Zima was dating Chris Harrison, who formerly served as host of the ABC reality television dating shows The Bachelor, The Bachelorette, and Bachelor in Paradise. The couple got married in November 2023.
