= Get Married (TV series) =

- Created by: Stacie Francombe
- Presented by: Colin Cowie; Deanna Pappas
- Country of origin: United States
- Original language: English

Production
- Running time: 23 minutes

Original release
- Network: WE tv Lifetime Television
- Release: April 15, 2007 – present

Related
- Get Married Atlanta (2006-2007)

Get Married is an American television series appearing weekdays on Lifetime Television. The series is hosted by event planner and lifestyle expert Colin Cowie, and co-hosted by reality television star Deanna Pappas.

== History ==
Get Married spawned from a local version in Atlanta called Get Married Atlanta, hosted by Renée Roberts and Jenn Hobby, which began airing in January 2006. With the success of the local show, the series went national on April 15, 2007, as Get Married, when WE tv aired six weekly episodes. Seeking a larger audience, show creator Stacie Francombe took the series to Lifetime Television for an October 1, 2007 premiere.

== Cast ==
For the short run on WE tv, the series was hosted by Renée Roberts and Jenn Hobby, and featured wedding expert Crys Stewart and correspondent Jessica Campbell. The first season on Lifetime was hosted by David Tutera with correspondent Jessica Campbell, both of whom were replaced for the second season. Deanna Pappas was hired by show creator Stacie Francombe after watching Pappas on the fourth season of The Bachelorette. Show creator Stacie Francombe hosted the final season of Get Married.
