= Tyler Cameron =

American television personality, model and general contractor

- Cameron in 2026
- Born: January 31, 1993 (age 33); Jupiter, Florida, U.S.
- Education: Wake Forest University (BA); Florida Atlantic University (MBA)
- Occupations: Television personality; model
- Modeling information
- Height: 6 ft 3 in (1.91 m)
- Hair color: Brown
- Eye color: Blue
- Agency: Soul Artist Management (New York); Next Management (Miami)
- Football career

Profile
- Positions: Quarterback, tight end

Personal information
- Born: January 31, 1993 (age 33)
- Listed height: 6 ft 3 in (1.91 m)
- Listed weight: 235 lb (107 kg)

Career information
- High school: Jupiter Community (Jupiter, Florida)
- College: Wake Forest (2012–2014) Florida Atlantic (2015–2016)
- NFL draft: 2017: undrafted

Career history
- Baltimore Ravens (2017)*
- * Offseason or practice squad member only

Tyler Cameron (born January 31, 1993) is an American television personality, model, and general contractor. Cameron gained national attention as the runner-up on season fifteen of The Bachelorette, starring Hannah Brown. He is signed as a model with Soul Artist Management in New York City and Next Management Miami.

== Early life and education ==
Cameron was born in Jupiter, Florida, to parents Jeff Cameron and Andrea Hermann Cameron; his mother worked as a realtor in South Florida. Cameron is the eldest of three sons. During the Great Recession, the family suffered economically, resulting in them losing their home and Cameron's parents divorcing.

After graduating from Jupiter Community High School, where he was teammates with Cody Parkey, Matthew Vankeuren, Phillip Benson, and Matthew Cornwell, Cameron attended Wake Forest University, where he was the backup quarterback for the Wake Forest Demon Deacons football team. After graduating with his bachelor's degree, Cameron enrolled in the Florida Atlantic University College of Business and received a Master of Business Administration degree in 2018.

== Career ==
Cameron began modeling while in college, after being discovered on Instagram. He ultimately went on to sign modeling contracts with Soul Artist Management in New York City and Next Management Miami.

In 2019, Cameron was cast in season fifteen of The Bachelorette, starring former Miss Alabama USA Hannah Brown. Filming took place throughout the spring of 2019. His occupation was listed as a general contractor on the show, although he did not receive his building contractor license until December that year. Cameron was later revealed as a contestant by the American Broadcasting Company (ABC) on May 7, 2019. Cameron went on to place as the runner-up, being eliminated by Brown during the finale episode, aired on July 30, 2019, and filmed in Crete. During the reunion aired the same night, Brown revealed that she had broken up with winner Jed Wyatt after it arose that he was in a relationship with another woman just prior to and during filming. Brown then asked Cameron on a date, to which he accepted, although they ultimately did not end up resuming their relationship. During his tenure on the show, Cameron received widespread media attention for his multiple feminist statements, and for often coming to the defense of Brown after she was the victim of acts of alleged sexism by contestants such as Luke Parker.

After the conclusion of the season, fans of the show and media outlets called on Cameron to be announced as the lead for the upcoming season of The Bachelor. Host Chris Harrison stated that he believed Cameron wouldn't be a suitable choice following media reports of him dating fashion model Gigi Hadid, and Cameron later revealed in an interview that he was in talks to become the Bachelor, but rejected the offer. Ultimately, Peter Weber was chosen as the lead for the twenty-fourth season.

In 2020, following the death of his mother, Cameron moved back to Jupiter, Florida, where he began a home construction/renovation company. In 2024, he starred in an Amazon Prime "hybrid reality-docuseries," Going Home with Tyler Cameron, that follows his business as well as his renovation of his mother's house. In July 2025, the show was nominated for a Daytime Emmy Award for Outstanding Instructional/How-To Program.

In 2026, Cameron joined the cast of season 35 of Dancing with the Stars. He and his partner, Sharna Burgess, were eliminated in week 7 for their horror movie night, Dracula-themed Viennese waltz with a 26/40 score from the judges. During dedication night in week 6, Cameron announced that his fiance, Tate Madden, is pregnant with their first child, a baby girl.

== Professional football ==
Pre-draft measurables
Height	Weight	Arm length	Hand span	40-yard dash	10-yard split	20-yard split	20-yard shuttle	Three-cone drill	Vertical jump	Broad jump	Bench press
6 ft 2 7/8 in (1.90 m)	232 lb (105 kg)	31 in (0.79 m)	9 3/4 in (0.25 m)	4.75 s	1.60 s	2.75 s	4.44 s	7.38 s	35.5 in (0.90 m)	9 ft 4 in (2.84 m)	22 reps
All values from Pro Day

Cameron had initially planned to play football professionally and had been signed as an undrafted free agent by the Baltimore Ravens, but was forced to end his football career after a shoulder injury.

== Filmography ==
Year	Title	Role	Notes
2019	The Bachelorette	Himself	Contestant; season 15
2020	Single Parents	Danny	Episode: "Chez Second Grade"
2020	Barkitechture	Host	1 season
2021	The Bachelor	Himself	Guest appearance on Episode 6; The Bachelor (season 25)
2021	Good on Paper	Ruggedly Handsome Man	Netflix film
2021	Saturday Night Live	Himself	Season 47, Episode 2
2022	The Real Dirty Dancing	Himself	Contestant; season 1 runner-up
2023	Special Forces: World's Toughest Test	Himself	Contestant; finalist and winner
2024	Going Home with Tyler Cameron	Himself	Main role
2026	Dancing with the Stars	Himself	Contestant (season 35)

== Awards and nominations ==
Year	Award	Category	Nominated work	Result	Ref.
2019	People's Choice Awards	The Competition Contestant of 2019	The Bachelorette	Nominated	
2025	Daytime Emmy Awards	Outstanding Instructional/How-To Program	Going Home with Tyler Cameron	Nominated	

Preceded by Blake Horstmann	The Bachelorette runner up Season 15	Succeeded by Ben Smith
