= Matt James (television personality) =

American television personality (born 1991)

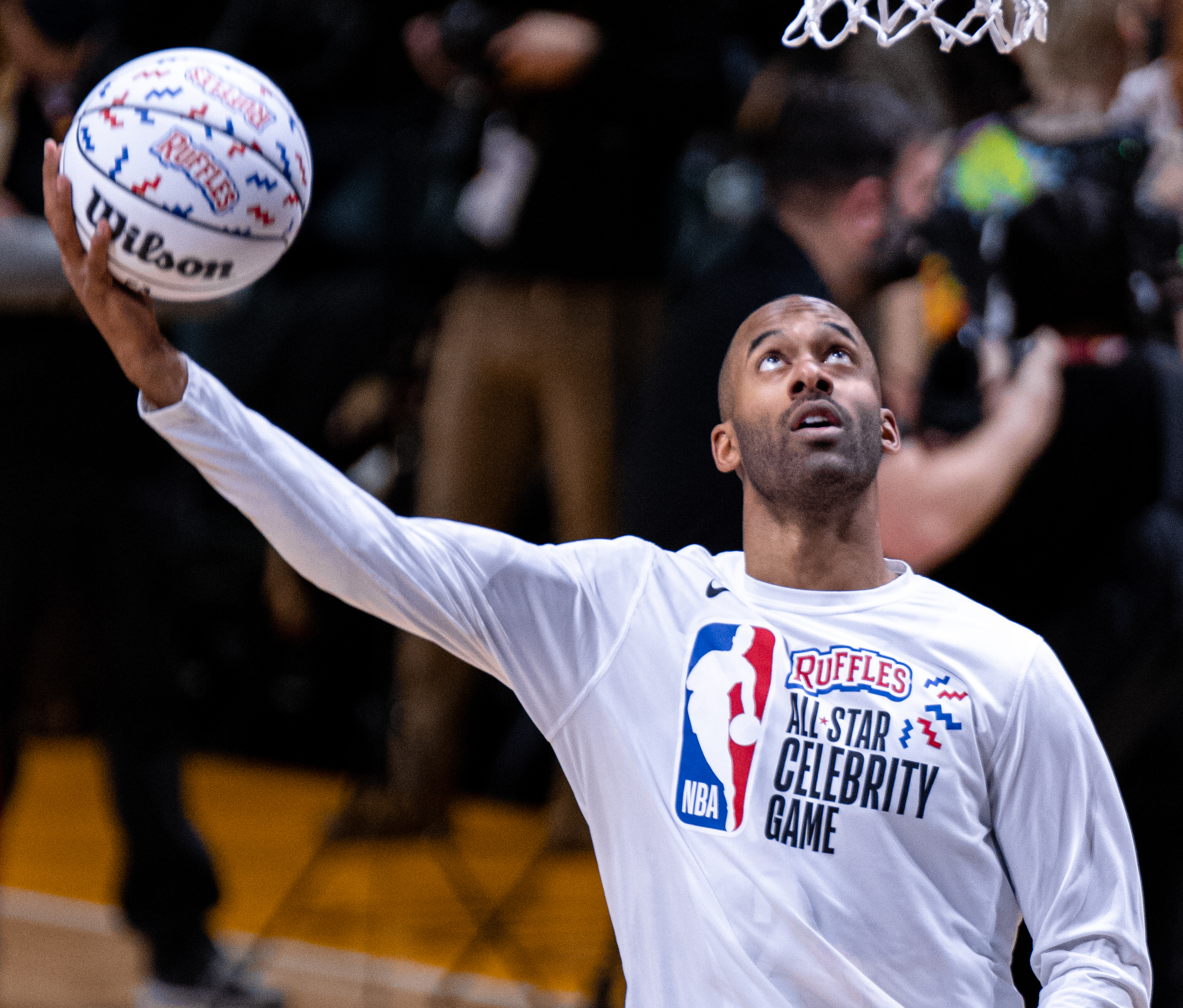
- Born: Matthew James; December 5, 1991 (age 34)
- Education: Wake Forest University (BA)
- Occupations: Real estate broker, entrepreneur, community organization founder
- Football career

No. 15, 87
- Position: Wide receiver

Personal information
- Born: December 5, 1991 (age 34)
- Listed height: 6 ft 5 in (1.96 m)
- Listed weight: 211 lb (96 kg)

Career information
- High school: Sanderson (Raleigh, North Carolina)
- College: Wake Forest (2010–2014)
- NFL draft: 2015: undrafted

Career history
- Carolina Panthers (2015)*; New Orleans Saints (2015)*
- * Offseason or practice squad member only

Matthew James (born December 5, 1991) is an American television personality, businessman, and former NCAA football player. James is best known for being the first Black male lead for The Bachelor in season 25.

== Early life and education ==
James was raised in Raleigh, North Carolina, the son of Manny and Patty James. Growing up, James was raised by his mother. He is biracial, having a Black Nigerian father and White American mother. James identifies as black. He graduated from Sanderson High School in 2010 before going to Wake Forest University. James obtained his Bachelor's degree in Economics from Wake Forest University in 2015 where he was also a wide receiver for Wake Forest Demon Deacons football team from 2011 to 2014.

== Professional football ==
Pre-draft measurables
Height	Weight	Arm length	Hand span	40-yard dash	10-yard split	20-yard split	20-yard shuttle	Three-cone drill	Vertical jump	Broad jump	Bench press
6 ft 4 5/8 in (1.95 m)	211 lb (96 kg)	33 3/4 in (0.86 m)	9 3/8 in (0.24 m)	4.57 s	1.58 s	2.64 s	4.44 s	6.71 s	36.0 in (0.91 m)	10 ft 8 in (3.25 m)	16 reps
All values from Pro Day

He had mini-camp tryouts with the Carolina Panthers and New Orleans Saints of the National Football League in May and June 2015, but was not signed by either team.

== Career ==
Before moving to New York City, James worked at PNC Bank in Pittsburgh, Pennsylvania. He works for CBRE Group, Inc., a commercial real estate company in New York City. James is also the founder of ABC Food Tours, a non-profit organization that educates children in underserved communities about food and exercise in New York City.

=== The Bachelor ===
James and The Bachelorette contestant Tyler Cameron, his friend and work colleague, played football at Wake Forest University together. Cameron's mother nominated James to be a contestant on The Bachelorette before she died. James was originally cast to be a contestant for season 16 of The Bachelorette, starring Clare Crawley, but after filming was delayed due to the impacts of the COVID-19 pandemic, he was instead selected to be the next Bachelor for season 25 of The Bachelor, becoming the first male African American lead in the franchise's history. (Note: Although James was initially to be the second African American lead, the first was Rachel Lindsay in The Bachelorette season 13 before the sudden introduction of Tayshia Adams in The Bachelorette season 16, which would be filmed less than two months later. James became the third African American lead in the franchise's history.) He is the first Black Bachelor lead in the show's history. The season concluded with James choosing to pursue a relationship with 24-year-old graphic designer Rachael Kirkconnell.

=== Dancing with the Stars ===
In September 2021, James was announced as one of the celebrities competing on season 30 of Dancing with the Stars. He was partnered with Lindsay Arnold. They were eliminated on week 4, finishing in 12th place.

== Personal life ==
James was in a relationship with Rachael Kirkconnell, the woman he chose on The Bachelor for 4 years, before they ended their relationship in January 2025. James is also a marathon runner and participated in the 2022 and 2023 New York City Marathon.

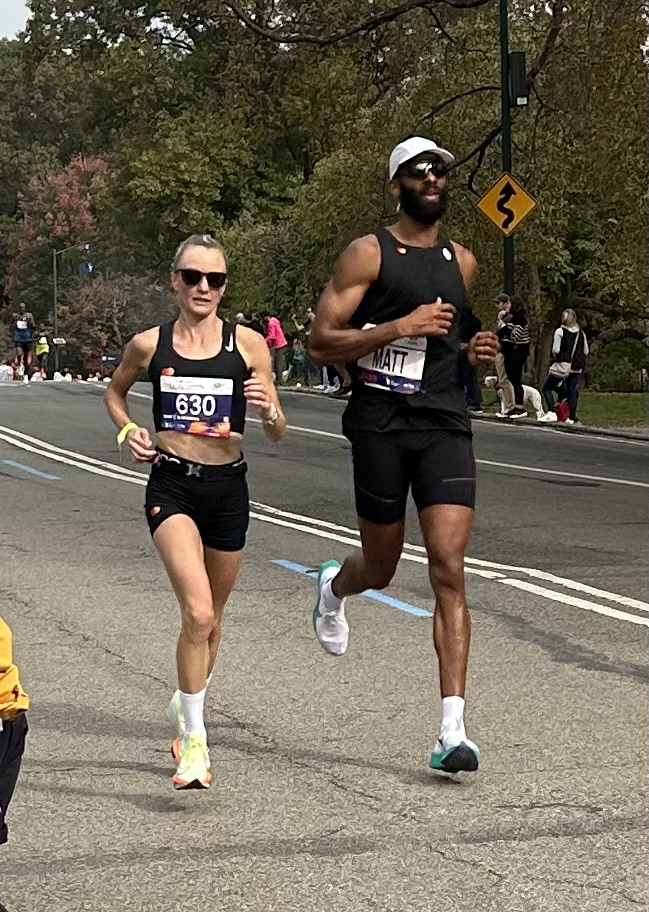
Shalane Flanagan and Matt James at mile 24 of the 2023 New York City Marathon

== Notes ==
Preceded by Peter Weber	The Bachelor; Season 25 (2021)	Succeeded by Clayton Echard
