= DeAnna Pappas =

American television personality

DeAnna Stagliano
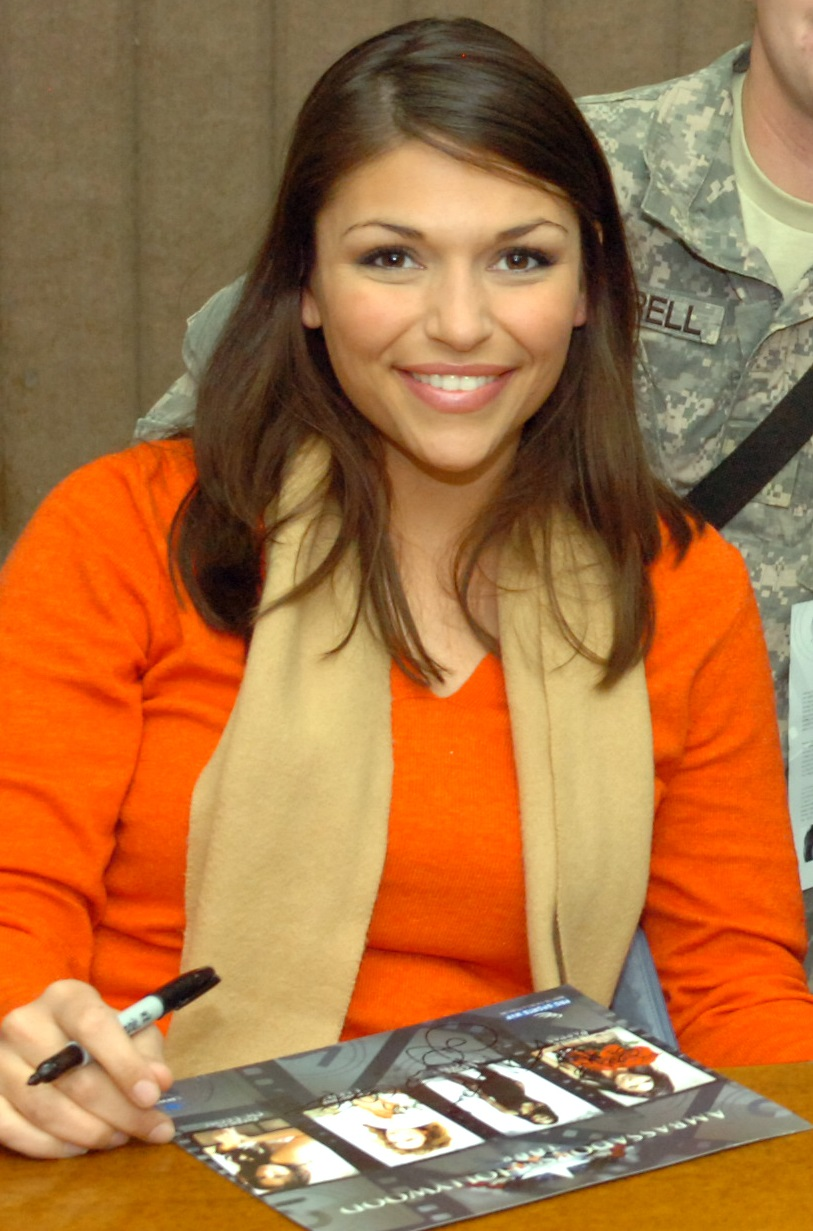
- DeAnna Pappas on a USO tour in 2009
- Born: DeAnna Marie Pappas; Marietta, Georgia, U.S.
- Spouse: Stephen Stagliano (m. 2011; sep. 2023)
- Children: 2

DeAnna Marie Stagliano (née Pappas; born November 20, 1981) is an American television personality best known for her participation in season 11 of the ABC reality television show The Bachelor, and season 4 of The Bachelorette.

== Early life ==
Pappas, of Greek heritage, who is the middle of three children, was born in Marietta, Georgia, and shortly thereafter moved to Kentucky with her mother and siblings. When she was twelve years old, her mother died of cancer and she relocated with her brother, Thomas, and sister, Chrissy, to Newnan, Georgia, to live with her father. She is a one-time resident of Nashville, Tennessee.

After high school she attended Georgia Military College and received a degree in General Studies.

== Television career ==
In 2007, Pappas decided to audition for The Bachelor, a reality television dating game show on ABC Television. She made it to the final rose ceremony, where bachelor Brad Womack rejected both women. He was chastised by Ellen DeGeneres, who later retracted her statement. ABC Television then tapped Pappas to star in The Bachelorette. The news was broken to her by Ellen DeGeneres while she was a guest on DeGeneres' daytime talk show.

In the 2008 season of The Bachelorette, Pappas eventually rejected single dad Jason Mesnick and accepted the marriage proposal of professional snowboarder Jesse Csincsak. Their relationship lasted a few months before the engagement was called off. Mesnick went on to become The Bachelor in 2009.

In October 2008, Pappas won Fox Reality Channel's "Golden Realtini", given to the most memorable reality performer of the year.

During her engagement, in 2009, Pappas became the co-host of Get Married on Lifetime reporting on wedding planning.

In late 2011, DeAnna was on the "Big Fat Greek Bachelorette Party" episode of the Oxygen cable-channel show Bachelorette Party.

== Personal life ==
In August 2010, Pappas became engaged to Stephen Stagliano, whose brother, Michael Stagliano, was on season five of The Bachelorette. They were married October 22, 2011, in Georgia. Their daughter, Addison Marie, was born on February 6, 2014. Their son, Austin Michael, was born on March 1, 2016. On January 20, 2023, she announced on social media that she and husband Stephen have separated.

== Other work ==
In January 2009, Pappas visited American troops in Kuwait as part of a USO visit. She was joined by actress Christine Lakin and Miss USA 2007 Rachel Smith.

Preceded by Jen Schefft	The Bachelorette; Season 4	Succeeded by Jillian Harris
