= Paul Friedrich (comic artist) =

American artist

Paul Friedrich is an American comics artist from Raleigh, North Carolina. He is the creator of the characters Onion Head Monster and Hubie the Dead Cow, among others. He is also the creator of HellCar comics.

== Life ==
Friedrich was born to Denise and Al Friedrich of North Hills. His interest in art began at Brooks Elementary School in Raleigh. He won a $200 cash prize from the Art in the Park painting of Pullen Park from local reporter Fred Fletcher of WRAL. He attended Jesse O. Sanderson High School, where he worked with artist Bob Rankin, and graduated from East Carolina University in 1989.

In 2007 Friedrich was nominated for an Eisner Award for his book, Onion Head Monster Attacks. The book was nominated in the Best Humor Publication category, but lost to Bob Burden's Flaming Carrot.

Friedrich also designed the album covers, poster art and logo for all the CDs released by Monty Warren & the Friggin Whatevers, a roots rock group whose members are based in Raleigh, North Carolina and West Palm Beach, Florida: "Trailer Park Angel" (2008), "Let's Go to Therapy" (2012) and "Far Out Close Up" (2015).
