= Jesse Csincsak =

American snowboarder

- Born: April 3, 1982 (age 44)
- Occupation: Professional snowboarder
- Height: 5 ft 9 in (1.75 m)
- Spouse: Ann Lueders (m. 2010)
- Children: 3
- Website: www.jessecsincsak.com

Jesse Csincsak (born April 3, 1982) is an American professional snowboarder, television personality, and founder of the nonprofit organization JSAK Snowboarding, which helps snowboarders with Olympic aspirations to raise money for training, travel, and related expenses. Csincsak owns a couple property management Companies serving Colorado's mountain communities and the Arizona valley of the sun. Jesse co founded Southwest Tactical defense group a firearms training facility. He was also a coach at High Cascade Snowboard Camp and a snowboard instructor at Breckenridge Ski Resort.

Csincsak was the winner of the fourth season of the television reality show competition The Bachelorette. He was married on August 28, 2010 to Ann Lueders, who appeared as a contestant on the thirteenth season of The Bachelor. The couple married with a televised wedding in Las Vegas and hosted a post-wedding bash at the resort Rumor with star studded wedding party. The couple have two sons and a daughter.

In a September 2025 post to his Facebook account, Csincsak identified as a Christian nationalist, M.A.G.A, Right wing Conservative.

== Snowboarding ==
Csincsak is a regular stanced rider and has been competing in snowboarding since 1994.

=== Rankings ===
- 2006-2007: 607th overall in Swatch TTR World Tour Rankings.
- 50th in the 2007 Burton US Open Snowboarding Championships (TTR 6 Star Event) (Stratton, VT)
- 16th in the 2007 Chevrolet Revolution Tour (TTR 2 Star Event) (Copper Mtn., Colorado)
- 64th in the 2006 Burton US Open Snowboarding Championships (TTR 6 Star Event) (Stratton, VT)

=== FIS competition standings ===
FIS competition standings
Year	Ranking
2007-2008	654th for Half Pipe
2006-2007	458th for Half Pipe; 1016th in Snowboard Cross
2005-2006	194th for Half Pipe; 842nd in Snowboard Cross
2004-2005	173rd for Half Pipe; 949th in Snowboard Cross
2003-2004	383rd for Half Pipe; 615th in Snowboard Cross
2002-2003	651st in Snowboard Cross

== Television appearances ==
- Made Season 8 Episode 9 (episode 66) He later appeared in a 2010 episode
- The Bachelorette Season 4, April - June 2008, and was chosen by DeAnna Pappas in the final episode, over fellow suitor Jason Mesnick. The couple set their wedding date for May 9, 2009 but their relationship ended in November 2008.
- True Life: "Resolutions Made and Kept"
- America's Most Wanted (1 episode)
- Called Beyond the Medal, covering the 2010 Winter Olympics.
