= Chris Harrison =

American television personality

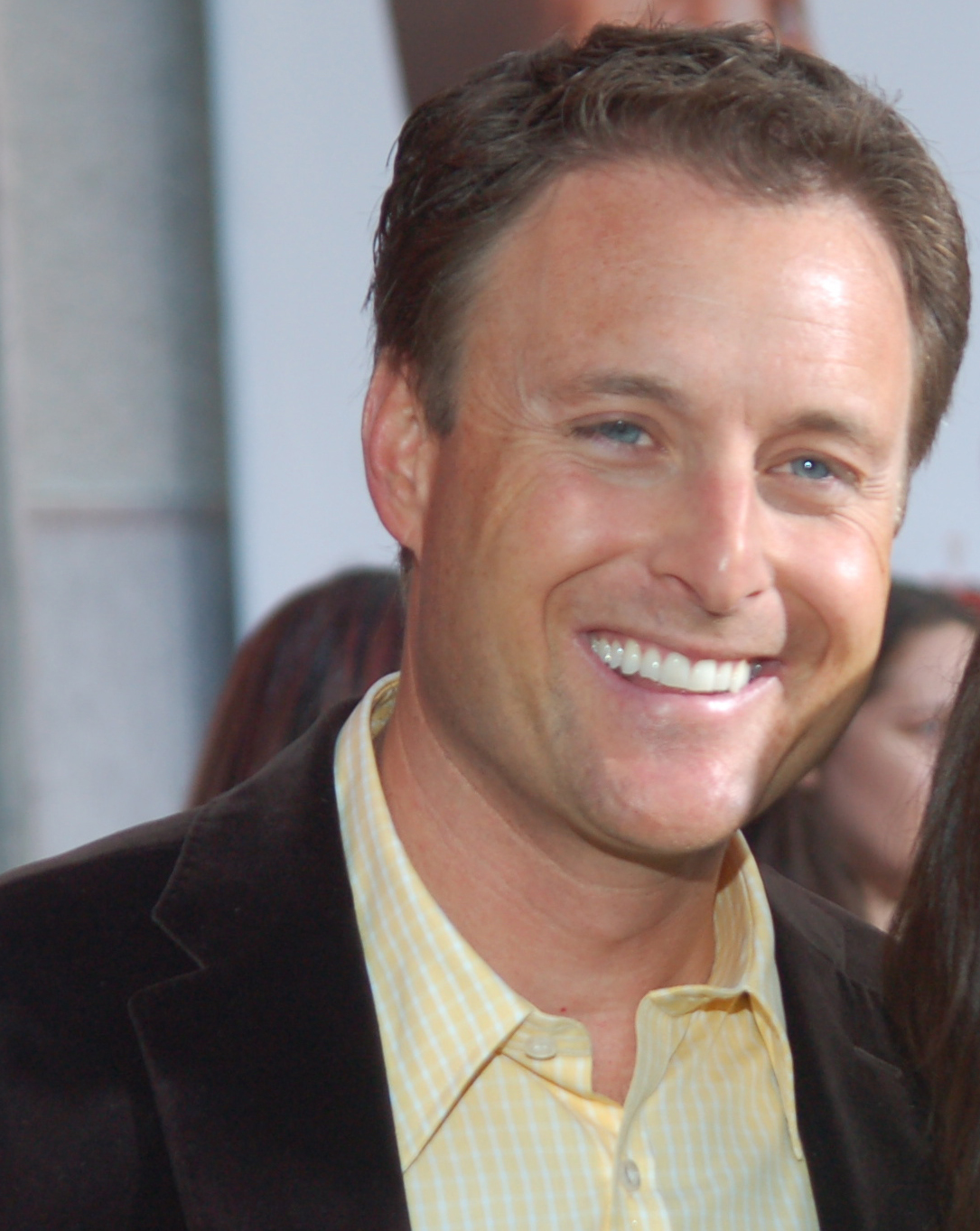
- Harrison at the premiere for The Proposal in June 2009
- Born: Christopher Bryan Harrison; July 26, 1971 (age 55); Dallas, Texas, U.S.
- Education: Oklahoma City University
- Occupation: Television personality
- Years active: 1993–present
- Spouses: Gwen Harrison (m. 1994; div. 2012); Lauren Zima (m. 2023)
- Children: 2

Christopher Bryan Harrison (born July 26, 1971) is an American television and game show host, best known for his role as the host of the ABC reality television dating show The Bachelor from 2002–2021. He also hosted its spin-offs The Bachelorette from 2003–2021, Bachelor Pad from 2010–2012, Bachelor in Paradise from 2014–21, the first season of Bachelor in Paradise: After Paradise in 2015, Bachelor Live in 2016, and The Bachelor Winter Games in 2018. He also served as the host of the syndicated version of Who Wants to Be a Millionaire from 2015–2019.

== Early life and education ==
Harrison was born in Dallas. He graduated from Lake Highlands High School in 1989. He attended Oklahoma City University on a soccer scholarship. He was initiated into the Kappa Sigma fraternity while in college.

== Career ==
From 1993–99, Harrison worked as a sports reporter at CBS affiliate KWTV in Oklahoma City. He also worked briefly for TVG Network, a horse racing channel, and was the host of Designers' Challenge on HGTV. In 2001, Harrison hosted the short-lived game show Mall Masters for GSN.

In 2002, Harrison guest-starred on Sabrina the Teenage Witch, as a music show host, in the episode "Ping, Ping a Song".

In 2006, Harrison appeared in the box office spoof flop Date Movie where he host a parody of The Bachelor called The Extreme Bachelor: Desperate Editionas Ty Andrews introduces Grant Funkyerdoder (Adam Campbell) greeting all the women and is asked to eliminate the losers by shooting them one by one except Julia Jones (Alyson Hannigan).

On November 23, 2008, Harrison hosted the American Music Awards pre-show live on ABC. His co-hosts were Dancing with the Stars judge Carrie Ann Inaba, and Pussycat Dolls member Nicole Scherzinger.

The TV Guide Network, now known as "Pop", announced that Harrison was signed to anchor its live red carpet awards coverage, beginning with the 2009 Primetime Emmy Awards in September. In 2011, Harrison and Brooke Burns co-hosted the game show You Deserve It. He has also co-hosted Hollywood 411 on the former TV Guide Network.

In 2010, Harrison guest-starred in an episode of the TV Land sitcom Hot in Cleveland called "The Bachelors" (S5E24).

In 2011, Harrison appeared in the film The Short Cut where its a modern day retelling of Aesop's Fabel 'The Tortoise and the Hare'.

In April 2015, Disney-ABC announced that Harrison would replace Terry Crews as host of the syndicated version of Who Wants to Be a Millionaire? for the 2015–16 season. GSN began airing reruns of this show on December 18, 2017, marking a return to the network for him since the cancellation of Mall Masters. Harrison earned two nominations for Outstanding Game Show Host in 2018 and 2019, but lost to Wayne Brady and Alex Trebek, respectively.

On May 19, 2015, Harrison branched out from TV and published his first romance novel, The Perfect Letter.

Harrison hosted ABC's reality television dating shows The Bachelor, The Bachelorette, Bachelor in Paradise, and its spinoffs. He also serves as the voice of the "Bachelor Whammy" in the 2019 reboot version of Press Your Luck hosted by Elizabeth Banks on ABC.

=== Exit from The Bachelor franchise ===
On February 13, 2021, Harrison announced that he would be temporarily stepping aside from the franchise after facing criticism for defending a contestant on The Bachelor accused of racism. In March 2021, alternative hosts were announced for season 17 of The Bachelorette. In June 2021, it was announced that after 19 years, Harrison had permanently departed the franchise.

== Personal life ==
Harrison was married to his college sweetheart, Gwen Harrison. They have two children, Joshua and Taylor. In May 2012, after 18 years of marriage, Harrison and his wife announced they were ending their marriage. As of 2018, Harrison was confirmed to be dating Lauren Zima, a reporter and journalist for Entertainment Tonight. The couple got married in November 2023.
