= Hydroxycut =

Brand of dietary supplements

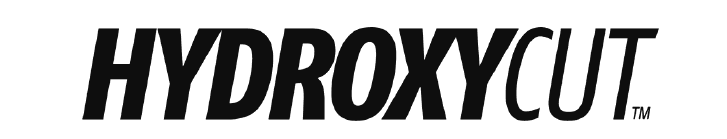
- Product type: Dietary supplements
- Current owner: Iovate Health Sciences Inc.
- Country: Canada
- Introduced: 2002
- Discontinued: Recalled 2009 (placed back on market in 2010)
- Related brands: List of brand names
- Markets: Worldwide
- Registered as a trademark in: September 1, 2010; USPTO
- Ambassador: Sean Lowe
- Tagline: Lose Weight Your Way.
- Website: hydroxycut.com

Hydroxycut is a brand of dietary supplements that is marketed as a weight loss aid. Hydroxycut was originally developed and manufactured by MuscleTech Research and Development; MuscleTech was sold to Iovate Health Sciences in 2003–2004 and declared bankruptcy in 2005; Iovate continues to use MuscleTech as a brand to market Hydroxycut.

Since 2013, the primary ingredients in the product line include caffeine, lady's mantle extract (Alchemilla vulgaris), wild olive extract (Olea europaea), cumin extract (Cuminum cyminum), wild mint extract (Mentha longifolia), and, in some products, green coffee bean extract (Coffea canephora).

Before the 2004 reformulation, formulations contained ephedra, a supplement banned by the FDA in 2004. Before the 2009 reformulation, formulations contained several substances with potential to harm the liver. After a series of reports in the medical literature of serious liver problems, including one death, the FDA warned consumers to stop using Hydroxycut, and Iovate agreed to voluntarily recall the products.

The harm caused by Hydroxycut products has led to calls for stricter regulation of the dietary supplement industry and to calls within the industry for more rigorous safety testing.

== Marketing and sales ==
Hydroxycut is sold at conventional retailers, online retailers, and through direct television marketing. Like many dietary supplements, published studies demonstrating scientific evidence of its effectiveness and safety is lacking.

In March 2013, Sean Lowe became the brand ambassador for Hydroxycut Hardcore. In the same month, IndyCar racer Tony Kanaan announced he will pilot the No. 11 Hydroxycut IndyCar at the Indianapolis 500 along with 8 other events at the 2013 IndyCar Championship. Hydroxycut has been promoted as being created and endorsed by doctors. Television advertisements for Hydroxycut featured a medical resident, although reporters were unable to locate him after Hydroxycut was removed from the market in 2009.

== Corporate background ==
MuscleTech Research and Development Inc was a Canadian company based in Toronto that operated with a group of closely related companies, and developed the Hydroxycut product line. Thousands of lawsuits were filed over ephedra in the early 2000s; the first lawsuits against MuscleTech began in 2000 and by 2004 there were about 80 pending. In 2003 and 2004, most of the assets of the MuscleTech group of companies were sold off to other companies, including Iovate Health Sciences; the same person controlled MuscleTech and Iovate. MuscleTech filed for bankruptcy in June 2005 and the claims of litigants against MuscleTech were resolved by 2007. Since then, MuscleTech has become a brand of Iovate, under which Hydroxycut products are sold.

Iovate is now owned by Xiwang Foodstuffs Company Ltd. and has been since 2016.

== Pre-2004 formulations ==
Prior to 2004, some formulations of Hydroxycut contained ephedra. There were reports of seizures in people who had ingested Hydroxycut, which were attributed to the ephedra and caffeine in the product. As a result, there were around 80 pending ephedra lawsuits against MuscleTech.

In 2003, Missouri Attorney General Jay Nixon filed a lawsuit in St. Louis against Hydroxycut's manufacturer, MuscleTech, stating that its marketing claims that Hydroxycut was "clinically proven" to be a "fat-burner" were false. Nixon also alleged that "MuscleTech's own consultants had serious concerns about the safety of Hydroxycut, but the company continued to market the product." MuscleTech paid $100,000 to settle the case and agreed to cease marketing ephedra-containing products in Missouri and to refund customers' money.

The New York Times reported in 2003 that internal documents from MuscleTech indicated that the company had buried studies showing that Hydroxycut was ineffective, covered up evidence of cardiac side effects, and even tampered with the documents it submitted as evidence in a lawsuit in Oklahoma.

In 2004, the FDA banned ephedra after 155 deaths from heart attack and stroke were attributed to ephedra, including the death of Baltimore Orioles pitcher Steve Bechler. It was the first banning of a dietary supplement by the FDA.

== Pre-2009 formulations ==
By 2009, about 15% of Americans had tried taking dietary supplements for weight loss, and Hydroxycut was the biggest seller, with about a million units sold each year.

However, Hydroxycut formulations contained several substances with potential to harm the liver such as hydroxycitric acid.

Scientific evidence of serious side effects from Hydroxycut products accumulated, including liver failure (requiring liver transplantation in some cases), rhabdomyolysis, and at least one death, of a 19-year-old man who used the product.

On May 1, 2009, the U.S. Food and Drug Administration (FDA) issued a warning to consumers to stop using Hydroxycut products, due to 23 reports of serious health problems associated with the use of Hydroxycut, and at least one death, and to destroy any product that they may possess. The warning stated "Although the liver damage appears to be relatively rare, FDA believes consumers should not be exposed to unnecessary risk. Consumers who have these products are urged to stop using them." Following the FDA warning, the manufacturer then agreed to voluntarily recall the products.

== Post-2009 formulations ==
After the 2009 recall, Hydroxycut was reformulated and placed back on sale, and the FDA confirmed that the only ingredient left from prior formulations was caffeine.

As of 2013, its primary ingredients include caffeine, Lady's mantle extract (Alchemilla vulgaris), Wild olive extract (Olea europaea), Cumin extract (Cuminum cyminum), Wild mint extract (Mentha longifolia) and, in some Hydroxycut products, Green coffee bean extract (Coffea canephora robusta).

Following the reformulation, case reports in the medical literature have continued to link Hydroxycut to serious side effects. An article published in 2010 reported on a case of atrial fibrillation that the author suspected was due to epigallocatechin gallate in Hydroxycut Green Tea, a product that as of 2012 is no longer marketed. Another case published in 2013 reported on a patient who developed ulcerative colitis due to Hydroxycut Hardcore.

In October 2020, 6ix9ine was reportedly hospitalized after having an overdose from mixing two Hydroxycut diet pills with a McDonald's McCafé coffee. He has claimed that he came to weigh more than 200 lbs after leaving prison but has said that using the medication had helped him shed 30 lbs since he was released. His lawyer denies the overdose claim.

== Reactions ==
The Hydroxycut case has been cited as emblematic of the weak regulation of dietary supplements in the U.S. Defenders of the nutritional supplements industry said that the recall demonstrated that the FDA has the power to protect consumers from toxic products, while critics cited it as evidence that the FDA's powers over dietary supplements need to be expanded.

While some diet supplement executives defended the safety of Hydroxycut and believed the media "over-hyped" the FDA withdrawal, others questioned why Iovate had not published long-term safety or efficacy studies on the final Hydroxycut products, and used weak trial duration and sample sizes. This is despite having the money to perform such studies and their self-definition as a "research-oriented" company. The editors of the nutrition trade journal Nutrition Business Journal noted that this recall "will ultimately be a good thing for the dietary supplement industry if it encourages weight-loss supplement manufacturers to care as much about their products' safety and efficacy as they do about expanding and protecting their bottom lines."

In a paper published in the World Journal of Gastroenterology in October 2010, Hydroxycut was cited as an example of "current and former weight loss products backed by potentially conflicted or low quality research." It noted that "Marketing materials for Hydroxycut cited two published studies asserting product effectiveness that were small, of short duration, reported no serious side effects, and did not disclose relationships between authors and the product manufacturer or that funding was received from the product manufacturer."

The paper noted that at least three studies supported the safety and effectiveness for weight loss of Cissus quadrangularis (CQ), which is an ingredient used in one of the reformulated Hydroxycut products, but "lack financial disclosures or funding sources, beyond mentioning that the CQ being tested was provided by" General Health Alliances, an herbal products manufacturer. The studies did not disclose that one of its authors was a chief scientific officer for GHA that holds a patent on a CQ product.
