= Emerald Cave =

Emerald Cave may refer to:

- Grotta dello Smeraldo in Italy
- Emerald Cave (Thailand) in Thailand
