= The Bachelor (American TV series) season 5 =

The Bachelor
- Season 5
- Promotional poster
- Starring: Jesse Palmer
- Presented by: Chris Harrison
- No. of contestants: 25
- Winner: Jessica Bowlin
- Runner-up: Tara Huckeby
- No. of episodes: 9

Release
- Original network: ABC
- Original release: April 7 – May 19, 2004

Season chronology
- ← Previous; Season 4 Next → Season 6

The fifth season of ABC reality television series The Bachelor premiered on April 7, 2004. The show featured 25-year-old Jesse Palmer, a professional football player from Nepean, Ontario. Palmer is the first Canadian and the youngest Bachelor lead in the show's history. The season concluded on May 19, 2004, with Palmer choosing to pursue a relationship with 21-year-old law student Jessica Bowlin. They ended their relationship several weeks after the finale.

== Contestants ==
The following is the list of bachelorettes for this season:

| Name | Age | Hometown | Occupation | Outcome |
|---|---|---|---|---|
| Jessica Bowlin | 21 | Huntington Beach, California | Law Student | Winner |
| Tara Huckeby | 23 | Shawnee, Oklahoma | General Contractor | Week 7 |
| Mandy Jaye Jeffreys | 26 | Midland, Texas | Interior Designer | Week 6 |
| Trish Schneider | 28 | Atlanta, Georgia | Model | Week 5 |
| Karen Lindsay | 28 | Pleasant Grove, Utah | Pharmaceutical Salesperson | Week 4 |
| Suzie Williams | 23 | Warren, Michigan | Prosthetic Technician | Week 4 |
| Jenny Schiralli | 26 | Longwood, Florida | Swim Instructor | Week 3 |
| Jessica Holcomb | 25 | Pearsall, Texas | Attorney | Week 3 |
| Julie Durda | 24 | Sacramento, California | NFL Cheerleader | Week 3 |
| Katie Gehart | 22 | Charlotte, North Carolina | Corporate Manager | Week 3 |
| Amber LaRoux | 26 | Sunriver, Oregon | Consultant | Week 2 |
| Anne-Catherine Labbé | 27 | Quebec City, Quebec | Stylist | Week 2 |
| Celeste Creel | 24 | Ithaca, New York | Executive Assistant | Week 2 |
| Jean-Marie Callahan | 26 | Gibson, North Carolina | Hairstylist | Week 2 |
| Kristy Romero | 22 | Dearborn, Michigan | Medical Student | Week 2 |
| Mandy Clemens | 25 | San Diego, California | Professional Soccer Player | Week 2 |
| Debbie Merkett | 27 | Pinetops, North Carolina | Massage Therapist | Week 1 |
| DeShaun Warner | 25 | Phillipsburg, New Jersey | Account Manager | Week 1 |
| Dolores Farburg | 27 | Madison, New Jersey | Sales Manager | Week 1 |
| Francine Jones | 25 | Houston, Texas | Fashion Assistant Manager | Week 1 |
| Holly Reeder | 26 | Tulsa, Oklahoma | Banker | Week 1 |
| Jen Matthews | 24 | Canton, Michigan | Professional Skater | Week 1 |
| Jessica Kyron | 21 | Winter Park, Florida | Student | Week 1 |
| Kristin Clearwater | 25 | Sausalito, California | Thai Pop Singer | Week 1 |
| Rachel Clementi | 27 | Buffalo, New York | Public Relations Manager | Week 1 |

=== Future appearances ===
Jesse Palmer was named as the host for Bachelor Nation franchise in future content starting from The Bachelor season 26, replacing original host Chris Harrison.

== Elimination Chart ==
| # | Contestants | Week | | | | | | |
| # | Contestants | 1 | 2 | 3 | 4 | 5 | 6 | 7 |
|---|---|---|---|---|---|---|---|---|
| 1 | Jessica B. | Trish | Katie | Mandy J. | Tara | Jessica B. | Tara | Jessica B. |
| 2 | Jean Marie | Kristy | Tara | Suzie | Jessica B. | Tara | Jessica B. | Tara |
| 3 | Suzie | Anne-Catherine | Jessica B. | Tara | Trish | Mandy J. | Mandy J. | |
| 4 | Dolores | Mandy C. | Trish | Jessica B. | Mandy J. | Trish | | |
| 5 | Debbie | Celeste | Mandy J. | Karen | Karen; Suzie | | | |
| 6 | Karen | Jessica H. | Jenny | Trish | Karen; Suzie | | | |
| 7 | Anne-Catherine | Mandy J. | Karen | Jenny; Jessica H. Julie; Katie | | | | |
| 8 | Francine | Jenny | Suzie | Jenny; Jessica H. Julie; Katie | | | | |
| 9 | Jessica H. | Amber | Jessica H. | Jenny; Jessica H. Julie; Katie | | | | |
| 10 | Julie | Tara | Julie | Jenny; Jessica H. Julie; Katie | | | | |
| 11 | Tara | Jean-Marie | Amber; Anne-Catherine; Celeste; Jean-Marie; Kristy; Mandy C. | | | | | |
| 12 | DeShaun | Jessica B. | Amber; Anne-Catherine; Celeste; Jean-Marie; Kristy; Mandy C. | | | | | |
| 13 | Jenny | Julie | Amber; Anne-Catherine; Celeste; Jean-Marie; Kristy; Mandy C. | | | | | |
| 14 | Amber | Suzie | Amber; Anne-Catherine; Celeste; Jean-Marie; Kristy; Mandy C. | | | | | |
| 15 | Mandy C. | Katie | Amber; Anne-Catherine; Celeste; Jean-Marie; Kristy; Mandy C. | | | | | |
| 16 | Jessica K. | Karen | Amber; Anne-Catherine; Celeste; Jean-Marie; Kristy; Mandy C. | | | | | |
| 17 | Holly | Debbie; DeShaun; Dolores; Francine; Holly; Jen; Jessica K. Kristin; Rachel | | | | | | |
| 18 | Kristy | Debbie; DeShaun; Dolores; Francine; Holly; Jen; Jessica K. Kristin; Rachel | | | | | | |
| 19 | Katie | Debbie; DeShaun; Dolores; Francine; Holly; Jen; Jessica K. Kristin; Rachel | | | | | | |
| 20 | Celeste | Debbie; DeShaun; Dolores; Francine; Holly; Jen; Jessica K. Kristin; Rachel | | | | | | |
| 21 | Mandy J. | Debbie; DeShaun; Dolores; Francine; Holly; Jen; Jessica K. Kristin; Rachel | | | | | | |
| 22 | Rachel | Debbie; DeShaun; Dolores; Francine; Holly; Jen; Jessica K. Kristin; Rachel | | | | | | |
| 23 | Kristin | Debbie; DeShaun; Dolores; Francine; Holly; Jen; Jessica K. Kristin; Rachel | | | | | | |
| 24 | Jen | Debbie; DeShaun; Dolores; Francine; Holly; Jen; Jessica K. Kristin; Rachel | | | | | | |
| 25 | Trish | Debbie; DeShaun; Dolores; Francine; Holly; Jen; Jessica K. Kristin; Rachel | | | | | | |

The contestant received the first impression rose.
The contestant won the competition.
The contestant was eliminated at the rose ceremony.

== Episodes ==
| No. overall | No. in season | Title | Original release date | Prod. code | U.S. viewers (millions) | Rating/share (18–49) |
|---|---|---|---|---|---|---|
| 37 | 1 | "Week 1" | March 31, 2004 | 501 | 11.08 | 5.2/14 |
| 38 | 2 | "Week 2" | April 7, 2004 | 502 | 10.47 | 4.6/12 |
| 39 | 3 | "Week 3" | April 14, 2004 | 503 | 11.95 | 5.3/13 |
| 40 | 4 | "Week 4" | April 21, 2004 | 504 | 11.62 | 5.0/13 |
| 41 | 5 | "Week 5" | April 28, 2004 | 505 | 10.33 | 4.7/12 |
| 42 | 6 | "The Women Tell All" | May 5, 2004 | N/A | 9.28 | 4.2/10 |
| 43 | 7 | "Week 6" | May 12, 2004 | 506 | 12.45 | 6.0/15 |
| 44 | 8 | "Week 7" | May 19, 2004 | 507 | 13.07 | 6.0/15 |
| 45 | 9 | "After the Final Rose" | May 26, 2004 | N/A | 7.50 | N/A |
