= Byron Velvick =

American television personality (born 1964)

- Born: June 24, 1964 (age 61); Downey, California, U.S.
- Occupations: Professional fisherman, television personality, sportscaster

Byron Paul Velvick (born June 24, 1964) is an American professional angler, television personality, and sportscaster. He is a two-time WON Bass U.S. Open champion fisherman who previously held the BASS record for three-day limit (April 13–15, 2000 in Clear Lake California). Velvick spent two years as a commentator for the ESPN2 show BassCenter from 2005 to 2006. He has also been an on-the-water reporter and contributing analyst for ESPN's fishing coverage. He retired from professional fishing at the end of the 2016 season, to spend more time with his family. He was also selected as a candidate for the television show The Bachelor in Season 6 of the show.

== The Bachelor ==
In September 2004, Velvick and Jay Overbye, a 40-year-old real estate agent from New Jersey were selected as candidates for the bachelor for Season 6 of the United States television show The Bachelor, with only Velvick continuing for the rest of the season. Velvick later chose bachelorette Maribel Liliana "Mary" Delgado. Delgado, who moved to the US with her parents from Cuba when she was a year old, had been a contestant the previous autumn during the series' 4th season.

During the finale show that aired during Thanksgiving week 2004, Velvick asked Mary Delgado to marry him in Spanish in order for her parents to be able to understand his proposal. Delgado accepted. After they became engaged, Delgado joined Velvick's tour and learned the sport. She is now a competing angler in her own right. Velvick and Delgado ended their relationship in December 2009.

In March 2015, Velvick married Belinda Juarez. They have a daughter. Velvick and Juarez divorced in 2020.

Preceded by Jesse Palmer	The Bachelor; Season 6	Succeeded by Charlie O'Connell
