= Bachelor in Paradise: After Paradise =

Television series

- Genre: Talk show
- Presented by: Chris Harrison; Jenny Mollen; Michelle Collins; Sean Lowe
- Country of origin: United States
- Original language: English
- No. of seasons: 2
- No. of episodes: 11

Production
- Executive producers: Mike Fleiss; Michael Davies; Jen Patton; Michael Davies
- Running time: 40-43 minutes
- Production companies: Next Entertainment; Warner Horizon Television; Embassy Row

Original release
- Network: ABC
- Release: August 3, 2015 – September 6, 2016

Related
- The Bachelor: The Bachelorette; Bachelor Pad; Bachelor in Paradise

Bachelor in Paradise: After Paradise (often referred to as just After Paradise) is an American television talk show that premiered on August 3, 2015, on ABC. The series is a spin-off of the reality series Bachelor in Paradise, making it one of the many spin-offs of The Bachelor, which both air on the same network.

Bachelor in Paradise: After Paradise is a live, weekly talk show that features cast of the series and celebrity fans discussing the most recent episodes of Bachelor in Paradise. The series also features questions from the audience, deleted scenes, outtakes and exclusive extra content. The talk show is hosted by Michelle Collins and co-hosted by Sean Lowe.

== Development and production ==
In July 2015, Bachelor in Paradise: After Paradise was announced to begin airing immediately following Bachelor in Paradise. Also announced was Chris Harrison was set to host the show and Jenny Mollen as co-host. On April 19, 2016, it was announced that the series would return for a second season with the introduction of a new host, comedian and talk show host, Michelle Collins and co-host, the star from season 17 of The Bachelor, Sean Lowe. The show didn't return in 2017, due to the crammed filming time of Season 4 due to the production shutdown over sexual misconduct allegations, but ABC said that After Paradise could return in the future. However, it did not return in 2018.

Mike Fleiss, Michael Davies, Jen Patton and Elan Gale are recognized as the series' executive producers; it is produced by Next Entertainment, Warner Horizon Television and Embassy Row, and is distributed by Warner Bros.

== Episodes ==
Season	Episodes	Originally released	
Season	Episodes	First released	Last released
1	6	August 3, 2015	September 7, 2015
2	5	August 9, 2016	September 6, 2016

=== Season 1 (2015) ===
No. overall	No. in season	Title	Original release date	U.S. viewers (millions)
1	1	"Episode 1: Scandal's Katie Lowes and Josh Malina; Ashley Iaconetti"	August 3, 2015	3.12
2	2	"Episode 2: Actor Paul Scheer; Ashley Salter and Tenley Molzahn"	August 10, 2015	3.33
3	3	"Episode 3: Director James Gunn; contestants Juelia Kinney and JJ Lane"	August 17, 2015	3.29
4	4	"Episode 4: "The View" Co-Host Michelle Collins; contestants Joe Bailey and Dan Cox"	August 24, 2015	4.00
5	5	"Episode 5: Actress Molly Tarlov; Many Cast Members"	August 31, 2015	3.81
6	6	"Episode 6: Comedian Nikki Glaser & Miss America 2015 Kira Kazantsev"	September 7, 2015	3.92

=== Season 2 (2016) ===
No. overall	No. in season	Title	Original release date	U.S. viewers (millions)
7	1	"Week 1"	August 9, 2016	2.42
8	2	"Week 2"	August 16, 2016	2.58
9	3	"Week 3"	August 23, 2016	2.82
10	4	"Week 4"	August 30, 2016	3.50
11	5	"Week 5"	September 6, 2016	4.04
