= Michelle Collins (disambiguation) =

Michelle Collins (born 1962) is an English actress and television presenter.

Michelle Collins or Michele Collins may also refer to:

- Michelle Collins (sprinter) (born 1971), American sprinter also known as Michele
- Michelle Collins (comedian) (born 1981), American comedian
