= The Bachelor (American TV series) season 30 =

The Bachelor
- Season 30
- Starring: Sam Hartman
- Presented by: Jesse Palmer

Release
- Original network: ABC
- Original release: March 21, 2027

Season chronology
- ← Previous; Season 29

The thirtieth season of The Bachelor will premiere on March 21, 2027, after a two-year hiatus following the twenty-ninth season featuring Grant Ellis. This season features 27-year-old Sam Hartman, a professional football quarterback for the Washington Commanders from Charlotte, North Carolina.

== Production ==
=== Casting and contestants ===
Hartman was announced as the Bachelor through an appearance on Good Morning America on November 13, 2026.

=== Filming and development ===
On February 21, 2025, during the twenty-ninth season, current and former crew members of The Bachelor franchise accused showrunners and executive producers Claire Freeland and Bennett Graebner of fostering a "hostile" and "toxic" workplace. Freeland and Graebner left the franchise in March following the allegations. The Bachelor was renewed for a thirtieth season on June 30, 2025, with Bachelor in Paradise executive producer Scott Teti serving as its new showrunner.

Filming is expected to begin in January 2027, following the conclusion of the regular 2026 NFL season.
