= The Bachelor (American TV series) season 2 =

The Bachelor
- Season 2
- Promotional poster
- Starring: Aaron Buerge
- Presented by: Chris Harrison
- No. of contestants: 25
- Winner: Helene Eksterowicz
- Runner-up: Brooke Smith
- No. of episodes: 9 (including 1 special)

Release
- Original network: ABC
- Original release: September 25 – November 20, 2002

Season chronology
- ← Previous; Season 1 Next → Season 3

The second season of ABC reality television series The Bachelor premiered on September 25, 2002. The show featured 28-year-old Aaron Buerge, a banker from Butler, Missouri. The season concluded on November 20, 2002, with Buerge choosing to propose to 27-year-old school psychologist Helene Eksterowicz. They ended their engagement weeks after the finale.

== Contestants ==
The following is the list of bachelorettes for this season:

Name	Age	Hometown	Job	Eliminated
Helene Eksterowicz	27	Gloucester, New Jersey	School Psychologist	Winner
Brooke Smith	22	Albertville, Alabama	College Student	Runner-up
Gwen Gioia	31	Philadelphia, Pennsylvania	Executive Recruiter	Week 6
Angela Vaught	27	Kansas City, Missouri	Registered Nurse	Week 5
Hayley Crittenden	28	Lake Oswego, Oregon	Retail Manager	Week 4
Heather Cranford	30	Dallas, Texas	Flight Attendant	Week 4
Christi Weible	23	Boise, Idaho	Assistant Financial Advisor	Week 3
Heather Campion	24	Walnut Creek, California	Marriage Therapy Trainee	Week 3
Kyla Dickerson	22	Midvale, Utah	Airline Supervisor	Week 3
Shannon Fries	26	North Lindenhurst, New York	Graphic Artist	Week 3
Dana Norris	24	Beverly Hills, California	Radio Sales	Week 2
Erin Lulevitch	25	West Chester, Pennsylvania	Publications Quality Control	Week 2
Suzanne Freeman	33	Redondo Beach, California	Flight Attendant	Week 2
Frances Dinglasan	30	San Francisco, California	Strategic Planning Analyst	Week 2 (Quit)
Anindita Dutta	27	Brooklyn, New York	Attorney	Week 2 (Quit)
Amber West	26	Chapel Hill, North Carolina	Psychologist	Week 1
Camille Langfield	29	Sherman Oaks, California	Actress	Week 1
Cari	29	Granite City, Illinois	3rd Grade Teacher	Week 1
Christy	24	Avondale, Arizona	Radiological Technologist	Week 1
Erin A.	24	Houston, Texas	Interior Designer	Week 1
Fatima Rivas	22	Long Beach, California	College Student	Week 1
Liangy Fernandez	30	Coral Gables, Florida	Paralegal	Week 1
Lori Todd	26	Dallas, Texas	Former NBA Cheerleader	Week 1
Merrilee Donohue	28	Forked River, New Jersey	1st Grade Teacher	Week 1
Suzi Reid	28	Richmond, Virginia	Communications Specialist	Week 1

=== Future appearances ===
Heather Cranford returned for the sixth season of The Bachelor along with season four contestant, Mary Delgado, where she placed 9th/12th after having been eliminated the week she arrived. Gwen Gioia competed in the first season of Bachelor Pad, placing 9th/11th.

== Elimination chart ==
#	Contestants	Week						
#	Contestants	1	2	3	4	5	6	7
1	Gwen	Angela	Helene	Angela	Helene	Gwen	Helene	Helene
2	Erin (TX)	Helene	Kyla	Gwen	Gwen	Helene	Brooke	Brooke
3	Frances	Erin (PA)	Angela	Brooke	Angela	Brooke	Gwen	
4	Helene	Brooke	Shannon	Helene	Brooke	Angela		
5	Brooke	Anindita	Gwen	Heather (TX)	Hayley; Heather (TX)			
6	Angela	Heather (CA)	Brooke	Hayley	Hayley; Heather (TX)			
7	Lori	Dana	Heather (TX)	Christi (ID); Heather (CA); Kyla; Shannon				
8	Kyla	Hayley	Hayley	Christi (ID); Heather (CA); Kyla; Shannon				
9	Christi (ID)	Christi (ID)	Heather (CA)	Christi (ID); Heather (CA); Kyla; Shannon				
10	Hayley	Shannon	Christi (ID)	Christi (ID); Heather (CA); Kyla; Shannon				
11	Dana	Frances	Dana; Erin (PA); Suzanne					
12	Heather (CA)	Suzanne	Dana; Erin (PA); Suzanne					
13	Anindita	Gwen	Dana; Erin (PA); Suzanne					
14	Suzanne	Kyla	Frances					
15	Amber	Heather (TX)	Anindita					
16	Merrilee	Amber; Camille; Cari; Christy (AZ); Erin (TX); Fatima; Liangy; Lori; Merrilee; Suzi						
17	Christy (AZ)	Amber; Camille; Cari; Christy (AZ); Erin (TX); Fatima; Liangy; Lori; Merrilee; Suzi						
18	Heather (TX)	Amber; Camille; Cari; Christy (AZ); Erin (TX); Fatima; Liangy; Lori; Merrilee; Suzi						
19	Suzi	Amber; Camille; Cari; Christy (AZ); Erin (TX); Fatima; Liangy; Lori; Merrilee; Suzi						
20	Liangy	Amber; Camille; Cari; Christy (AZ); Erin (TX); Fatima; Liangy; Lori; Merrilee; Suzi						
21	Camille	Amber; Camille; Cari; Christy (AZ); Erin (TX); Fatima; Liangy; Lori; Merrilee; Suzi						
22	Erin (PA)	Amber; Camille; Cari; Christy (AZ); Erin (TX); Fatima; Liangy; Lori; Merrilee; Suzi						
23	Cari	Amber; Camille; Cari; Christy (AZ); Erin (TX); Fatima; Liangy; Lori; Merrilee; Suzi						
24	Fatima	Amber; Camille; Cari; Christy (AZ); Erin (TX); Fatima; Liangy; Lori; Merrilee; Suzi						
25	Shannon	Amber; Camille; Cari; Christy (AZ); Erin (TX); Fatima; Liangy; Lori; Merrilee; Suzi						

The contestant won the competition.
The contestant quit the competition.
The contestant was eliminated at the rose ceremony.

== Episodes ==
No. overall	No. in season	Title	Original release date	Prod. code	U.S. viewers (millions)	Rating/share (18–49)
8	1	"Revealed"	September 25, 2002	200	8.90	N/A
9	2	"Week 1"	October 2, 2002	201	11.00	4.9/12
There were no dates during the first week. Amber, Camille, Cari, Christy from Arizona, Erin from Texas, Fatima, Liangy, Lori, Merrilee, and Suzi were all sent home in the first rose ceremony.
10	3	"Week 2"	October 9, 2002	202	12.80	6.4/16
There were three group dates. Five women were sent on each. Just before the start of the rose ceremony, Anindita and Frances both quit the competition in doubt that things between Aaron and them would work out. Dana, Erin from Pennsylvania, and Suzanne were then eliminated at the rose ceremony.
11	4	"Week 3"	October 16, 2002	203	12.60	5.9/15
One-on-one date: Helene. There were two group dates that consisted of Angela, Christi from Idaho, Gwen, Hayley, Heather from California, Heather from Texas, Kyla, and Shannon. One-on-one date: Brooke Christi from Idaho, Heather from California, Kyla, and Shannon were eliminated at the rose ceremony.
12	5	"Week 4"	October 23, 2002	204	14.90	7.0/17
One-on-one date: Helene One-on-one date: Gwen Group date: Angela, Brooke, and Hayley One-on-one date: Heather from Texas Hayley and Heather from Texas were eliminated at the rose ceremony.
13	6	"Week 5"	October 30, 2002	205	15.00	7.3/18
Hometown Visits: Angela – Kansas City, Missouri; Helene – Gloucester, New Jersey; Gwen – Philadelphia, Pennsylvania; Brooke – Albertville, Alabama. Angela was eliminated at the rose ceremony.
14	7	"Week 6"	November 6, 2002	206	16.30	7.8/18
Overnight Dates: Brooke, Gwen, and Helene. Gwen was eliminated at the rose ceremony.
15	8	"The Women Tell All"	November 13, 2002	N/A	16.80	7.7/19
16	9	"Week 7"	November 20, 2002	207	25.90	11.9/28
Meeting Aaron's Parents and Final Dates: Brooke and Helene Brookes's limo pulled up to the altar first, where Aaron sent her home in a limo, crying. Helene then came to the altar, where Aaron professed his love for her and proposed. She accepted and was given the final rose.
