= The Bachelor (American TV series) =

American reality television series on ABC

- Genre: Dating game show; Reality television
- Created by: Mike Fleiss
- Presented by: Chris Harrison; Emmanuel Acho; Jesse Palmer
- Country of origin: United States
- Original language: English
- No. of seasons: 29
- No. of episodes: 306 (list of episodes)

Production
- Executive producer: Mike Fleiss
- Production companies: AND Syndicated Productions; Next Entertainment (seasons 1–27); Telepictures Productions (seasons 1–8); Warner Horizon Unscripted Television (Note: Known as Warner Horizon Television until 2020) (season 9–present); NZK Productions Inc.

Original release
- Network: ABC
- Release: March 25, 2002 – present

Related
- The Bachelorette; Bachelor Pad; Bachelor in Paradise; Bachelor in Paradise: After Paradise; Bachelor Live; The Bachelor Winter Games; The Bachelor Presents: Listen to Your Heart; The Bachelor: The Greatest Seasons – Ever!; The Golden Bachelor; The Golden Bachelorette

The Bachelor is an American dating and relationship reality television series that debuted on March 25, 2002, on ABC. For its first 25 seasons, the show was hosted by Chris Harrison. As the essence of the original The Bachelor franchise, its success resulted in several spin-offs including The Bachelorette, Bachelor Pad, Bachelor in Paradise, Bachelor in Paradise: After Paradise, The Bachelor Winter Games, The Bachelor Presents: Listen to Your Heart, The Bachelor: The Greatest Seasons – Ever!, The Bachelor Mansion Takeover, The Golden Bachelor, and The Golden Bachelorette, as well as spawning many international editions of the shows.

On June 30, 2025, the series was renewed for a thirtieth season, which is scheduled to premiere on March 21, 2027.

== Production ==
The series was created by Mike Fleiss. The After the Final Rose and other reunion specials were originally produced at Victory Studios in Los Angeles, California, and CBS Studio Center in Studio City, but are now taped at Warner Bros. Studios in Burbank. In the most recent run of The Bachelor, it brought in almost $86 million in advertising revenue.

== Plot ==
The series follows a single bachelor who is given a list of romantic interests from which he must choose a fiancée. During the season, the bachelor eliminates candidates (see The elimination process) each week which finally results in his last choice receiving a marriage proposal. The participants travel to romantic and exotic locations for their dates, and the conflicts in the series, both internal and external, stem from the elimination-style format of the show.

The description above is simply a general guideline. In truth, the series occasionally deviates from its intended format, which can lead to drama and conflict among people involved in the show. They may include, among other events:

- An eliminated candidate returning to the show to plead her case to the bachelor.
- A non-contestant, usually with a history in the franchise, pleads to be considered as a candidate for the bachelor.
- A bachelor distributing more or fewer roses than planned.
- A bachelor eliminating a woman outside of the normal elimination process. For example, the bachelor may eliminate both women on a two-on-one date.
- The bachelor chooses to pursue a relationship with his final selection rather than propose marriage.

The sixth season was the only season to feature a twist in casting. Since producers could not unanimously decide between Byron Velvick and Jay Overbye for the next Bachelor, the 25 women at the time participating had to decide which bachelor would make the best husband. At the end of the first episode, Velvick was chosen.

Notable cases where the bachelor violated the premise of the show are Brad Womack, who selected neither of his final two women on his first season, and Jason Mesnick, who broke off his engagement in the After the Final Rose episode and several months later proposed (offscreen) to the first runner-up (Molly Malaney)—who he later married. Like Mesnick, Arie Luyendyk Jr. also broke off his engagement and during the After the Final Rose episode, he proposed to the first runner-up (Lauren Burnham)—to whom he is now married.

== The elimination process ==
- In a "The Women Tell All" episode, the women who had been eliminated from the show participate in a talk show where they discuss their thoughts and experiences, and even dramatic secrets not previously mentioned before now.
- The two remaining women separately meet with the bachelor's family. At the end of the episode, one woman eventually exits the limo and is sent home, followed by the second woman who the bachelor proposes to by presenting the "final rose".
- In an After the Final Rose episode that immediately follows, the bachelor, the finalist, and the runner-up participate in a talk show. The identity of the next season's bachelor or bachelorette is often announced at the end of the episode.

If a woman decides she no longer wants to compete in the Bachelor, she can leave the competition at any moment. Occasionally, a woman gets taken off the show for violating a rule.

The bachelor has wide discretion in choosing how many and when to present the roses. For example, Sean Lowe presented several roses at his initial cocktail party.

It is common for contestants to be accused of not being on the show for the "right reasons," with their aim not to establish a genuine relationship with the Bachelor but rather to garner fame on television; other motives include using the show to become an influencer, become a cast member on Bachelor in Paradise, Dancing with the Stars, or the new lead on The Bachelorette, induce jealousy from an ex-boyfriend or other people in their personal life, or just to get free trips to exotic locations.

== Seasons ==
Season	Original run	Bachelor	Winner	Runner(s)-up	Proposal	Still together?	Relationship status
1	March 25 – April 25, 2002	Alex Michel	Amanda Marsh	Trista Rehn	No	No	Michel did not propose to Marsh, but instead, they entered into a relationship. They broke up several months later.
2	September 25 – November 20, 2002	Aaron Buerge	Helene Eksterowicz	Brooke Smith	Yes	No	Buerge and Eksterowicz broke up in January 2003.
3	March 24 – May 21, 2003	Andrew Firestone	Jennifer Schefft	Kirsten Buschbacher	Yes	No	Firestone and Schefft broke up in December 2003.
4	September 24 – November 20, 2003	Bob Guiney	Estella Gardinier	Kelly Jo Kuharski	No	No	Guiney did not propose to Gardinier, but she accepted a promise ring indicating that they would still date. They broke up in December 2003.
5	April 7 – May 26, 2004	Jesse Palmer	Jessica Bowlin	Tara Huckeby	No	No	Palmer did not propose to Bowlin. They continued to date, but broke up in June 2004.
6 (Note: Season 6 began with two potential Bachelors, Byron Velvick and Jay Overbye. In the first episode, the women voted Velvick as the sole Bachelor for the rest of the season.)	September 22 – November 24, 2004	Byron Velvick	Mary Delgado	Tanya Michel	Yes	No	Velvick and Delgado split in December 2009, after five years together.
7	March 28 – May 16, 2005	Charlie O'Connell	Sarah Brice	Krisily Kennedy	No	No	O'Connell did not propose to Brice, but instead they entered into a relationship. They broke up in September 2007, but got back together in November 2008. However, they broke up for good in April 2010.
8	January 9 – February 27, 2006	Travis Lane Stork	Sarah Stone	Moana Dixon	No	No	Stork did not propose to Stone, but instead they entered into a relationship. They broke up in March 2006.
9	October 2 – November 27, 2006	Lorenzo Borghese	Jennifer Wilson	Sadie Murray	No	No	Borghese did not propose to Wilson, but instead they entered into a relationship. They broke up in January 2007. He briefly dated runner-up Murray, but they broke up in March 2007.
10	April 2 – May 22, 2007	Andy Baldwin	Tessa Horst	Bevin Powers	Yes	No	Baldwin and Horst called off their engagement in June 2007, but continued to date. They ended their relationship in September 2007.
11	September 24 – November 20, 2007	Brad Womack	—N/a	DeAnna Pappas	No	No	Womack chose Pappas and Croft as the two finalists, but they were both rejected in the season's finale.
11	September 24 – November 20, 2007	Brad Womack	—N/a	Jenni Croft	No	No	Womack chose Pappas and Croft as the two finalists, but they were both rejected in the season's finale.
12	March 17 – May 12, 2008	Matt Grant	Shayne Lamas	Chelsea Wanstrath	Yes	No	Grant and Lamas broke up in July 2008.
13	January 5 – March 3, 2009	Jason Mesnick	Melissa Rycroft	Molly Malaney	Yes	No (Note: Jason and Melissa were no longer together after the show. He married the runner-up, Molly, and they are still together.)	In the season finale, it was revealed that Mesnick had called off the engagement with Rycroft and resumed a relationship with runner-up Malaney. Mesnick later proposed to Malaney in New Zealand, and they were married on February 27, 2010, in California. Their wedding aired on ABC on March 8, 2010. They live in Seattle, Washington with their daughter Riley (born March 14, 2013). The couple also shares custody of Jason's son, Tyler, from his previous marriage (born January 25, 2005).
14	January 4 – March 1, 2010	Jake Pavelka	Vienna Girardi	Tenley Molzahn	Yes	No	Pavelka and Girardi ended their engagement in June 2010.
15	January 3 – March 14, 2011	Brad Womack	Emily Maynard	Chantal O'Brien	Yes	No	Womack and Maynard broke up while their season was airing, but reconciled in time for the finale. However, they broke up for good in June 2011.
16	January 2 – March 12, 2012	Ben Flajnik	Courtney Robertson	Lindzi Cox	Yes	No	Flajnik and Robertson broke up while their season was airing, but reconciled in time for the finale. However, they broke up for good in October 2012.
17	January 7 – March 11, 2013	Sean Lowe	Catherine Giudici	Lindsay Yenter	Yes	Yes	Lowe and Giudici married on January 26, 2014. They live in Dallas, Texas with their three children - sons Samuel (born July 2, 2016) and Isaiah (born May 18, 2018), and daughter Mia (born December 23, 2019).
18	January 6 – March 10, 2014	Juan Pablo Galavis	Nikki Ferrell	Clare Crawley	No	No	Galavis did not propose to Ferrell but instead they decided to continue their relationship. They later appeared on Couples Therapy. They broke up in October 2014.
19	January 5 – March 9, 2015	Chris Soules	Whitney Bischoff	Becca Tilley	Yes	No	Soules and Bischoff announced their break-up on May 28, 2015.
20	January 4 – March 14, 2016	Ben Higgins	Lauren Bushnell	Joelle "JoJo" Fletcher	Yes	No	Higgins and Bushnell had their own reality show Ben and Lauren: Happily Ever After?. They announced their breakup on May 15, 2017.
21	January 2 – March 13, 2017	Nick Viall	Vanessa Grimaldi	Raven Gates	Yes	No	Viall and Grimaldi announced their breakup on August 25, 2017.
22	January 1 – March 6, 2018	Arie Luyendyk Jr.	Becca Kufrin	Lauren Burnham	Yes	No (Note: Arie and Becca were no longer together after the show. He married the runner-up, Lauren, and they are still together.)	During the live season finale, it was revealed that a few weeks after filming wrapped, Luyendyk had quickly called off his engagement to Kufrin and started dating runner-up Burnham. Luyendyk and Burnham got engaged during the After the Final Rose special and were married on January 12, 2019. They live in Scottsdale, Arizona with their four children - daughter Alessi (born May 29, 2019), twins Lux and Senna (born June 11, 2021), and daughter Livvy (born September 18, 2025).
23	January 7 – March 12, 2019	Colton Underwood	Cassie Randolph	Hannah Godwin	No	No	Randolph initially broke up with Underwood at the final three. Underwood then broke up with the remaining two women and asked Randolph to give him a second chance, and she agreed. They announced their breakup on May 29, 2020. In September 2020, Randolph filed a restraining order against Underwood, alleging that he stalked her and put a tracking device on her car. The restraining order was later dropped after the two reached a private agreement. Underwood came out as gay on April 14, 2021.
23	January 7 – March 12, 2019	Colton Underwood	Cassie Randolph	Tayshia Adams	No	No	Randolph initially broke up with Underwood at the final three. Underwood then broke up with the remaining two women and asked Randolph to give him a second chance, and she agreed. They announced their breakup on May 29, 2020. In September 2020, Randolph filed a restraining order against Underwood, alleging that he stalked her and put a tracking device on her car. The restraining order was later dropped after the two reached a private agreement. Underwood came out as gay on April 14, 2021.
24	January 6 – March 10, 2020	Peter Weber	Hannah Ann Sluss	Madison Prewett	Yes	No	During the live After the Final Rose special, it was revealed that Weber and Sluss had ended their engagement in January 2020. Although Weber and runner-up Prewett admitted to still having feelings for each other, they ultimately decided not to pursue a relationship. On May 2, 2020, Weber revealed that he was dating Kelley Flanagan, who finished in fifth place on his season. Weber and Flanagan announced their breakup on December 31, 2020. They got back together in August 2022, but broke up again in April 2023.
25	January 4 – March 15, 2021	Matt James	Rachael Kirkconnell	Michelle Young	No	No	James did not propose to Kirkconnell. Instead they began a relationship, but on the After the Final Rose special, it was confirmed that James had ended the relationship after Kirkconnell's racially insensitive past came to light. On April 28, 2021, James confirmed that he and Kirkconnell were back together. They announced their breakup on January 16, 2025.
26	January 3 – March 15, 2022	Clayton Echard	Susie Evans	Gabby Windey	No	No	Although the season ended with Evans rejecting Echard, it was revealed on the live After the Final Rose special that they had since gotten back together. They announced their breakup on September 23, 2022.
26	January 3 – March 15, 2022	Clayton Echard	Susie Evans	Rachel Recchia	No	No	Although the season ended with Evans rejecting Echard, it was revealed on the live After the Final Rose special that they had since gotten back together. They announced their breakup on September 23, 2022.
27	January 23 – March 27, 2023	Zach Shallcross	Kaity Biggar	Gabi Elnicki	Yes	Yes	Shallcross and Biggar married on May 23, 2025, and currently live in Austin, Texas.
28	January 22 – March 25, 2024	Joey Graziadei	Kelsey Anderson	Daisy Kent	Yes	Yes	Graziadei and Anderson's wedding is set for spring 2027 in Louisiana.
29	January 27 – March 24, 2025	Grant Ellis	Juliana Pasquarosa	Litia Garr	Yes	No	Ellis and Pasquarosa announced their breakup on June 13, 2025.
30	March 21, 2027	Sam Hartman	TBA				

== Ratings ==
Season	Timeslot (ET)	Premiered		Ended			TV season	Avg. Viewers (in millions)	Season ranking
Season	Timeslot (ET)	Date	Premiere viewers (in millions)	Date	Finale viewers (in millions)	After the Final Rose viewers (in millions)	TV season	Avg. Viewers (in millions)	Season ranking
1	Monday 9:00 pm	March 25, 2002	9.90	April 25, 2002	18.20	—N/a	2001–02	10.7	44
2	Wednesday 9:00 pm	September 25, 2002	11.00	November 20, 2002	25.90	—N/a	2002–03	13.93 (Note: Between the 2002 to 2005 TV season rankings, the two seasons are listed together in the final rankings together in The Bachelor.)	20
3	Wednesday 9:00 pm	March 24, 2003	10.20	May 21, 2003	15.10 (Note: The finale aired on Sunday, while the After the Final Rose special aired Wednesday.)	9.30	2002–03	13.93	20
4	Wednesday 9:00 pm	September 24, 2003	12.55	November 20, 2003	18.62	9.30 (Note: The After the Final Rose special aired the next day.)	2003–04	12.53	23
5	Wednesday 9:00 pm	April 7, 2004	11.08	May 26, 2004	13.07	7.50	2003–04	12.53	23
6	Wednesday 9:00 pm	September 22, 2004	8.20	November 24, 2004	10.00	10.20	2004–05	8.53	62
7	Monday 9:00 pm	March 28, 2005	8.23	May 16, 2005	9.27		2004–05	8.53	62
8	Monday 10:00 pm (Note: Three episodes aired on February 6, 13 and 27, airing at the earlier time of 9:00 pm for 120 minutes.)	January 9, 2006	6.24	February 27, 2006	11.53	—N/a	2005–06	9.3	53
9	Monday 9:00 pm	October 2, 2006	7.53	November 27, 2006	9.85	—N/a	2006–07	8.5	61
10	Monday 9:30 pm (Note: Two episodes had seventy-five minute airings started at 9:45 pm between April 2 and April 30 due to overtime the live show of Dancing with the Stars.)	April 2, 2007	9.86	May 22, 2007	12.67	8.00	2006–07	10.3	41
11	Monday 10:00 pm (Note: Two episodes had ninety-minute airings between September 24 and October 8, with the first one-third of airing at the earlier time at 9:30 pm and the second one-thirds aired in the regular time.)	September 24, 2007	9.23	November 20, 2007	11.22	12.30	2007–08	9.72	49
12	Monday 10:00 pm (Note: Two episodes had irregular time airings (late as after 9:30 pm) between March 17 and March 31. The second one-thirds aired in the regular time.)	March 17, 2008	8.58	May 12, 2008	8.85	—N/a	2007–08	7.90	80
13	Monday 8:00 pm	January 5, 2009	8.74	March 3, 2009	15.48	17.47	2008–09	11.53	24
14	Monday 8:00 pm	January 4, 2010	9.54	March 1, 2010	15.15	13.91	2009–10	12.22	23
15	Monday 8:00 pm	January 3, 2011	9.04	March 14, 2011	13.86	13.96	2010–11	10.79	35
16	Monday 8:00 pm	January 2, 2012	7.78	March 12, 2012	9.23	9.87	2011–12	8.85	49
17	Monday 8:00 pm	January 7, 2013	6.92	March 11, 2013	10.42	10.81	2012–13	9.48	41
18	Monday 8:00 pm	January 6, 2014	8.65	March 10, 2014	10.10	10.97	2013–14	9.59	32
19	Monday 8:00 pm	January 5, 2015	7.76	March 9, 2015	9.68	9.68	2014–15	9.68	46
20	Monday 8:00 pm	January 4, 2016	7.55	March 14, 2016	9.58	9.24	2015–16	9.53	41
21	Monday 8:00 pm	January 2, 2017	6.62	March 13, 2017	8.40	7.85	2016–17	9.00	33
22	Monday 8:00 pm	January 1, 2018	5.48	March 6, 2018	7.94	7.77	2017–18	7.92	47
23	Monday 8:00 pm	January 7, 2019	5.13	March 12, 2019	8.12	8.21	2018–19		
24	Monday 8:00 pm	January 6, 2020	6.07	March 10, 2020	7.70	8.49	2019–20		
25	Monday 8:00 pm	January 4, 2021	5.23	March 15, 2021	6.07	5.64	2020–21	6.46	37
26	Monday 8:00 pm	January 3, 2022	3.54	March 15, 2022	4.57	4.73	2021–22	TBA	TBA
27	Monday 8:00 pm	January 23, 2023	2.96	March 27, 2023	3.40	—N/a	2022–23	TBA	TBA
28	Monday 8:00 pm	January 22, 2024	3.18	March 25, 2024	4.14	—N/a	2023–24	TBA	TBA
29	Monday 8:00 pm	January 27, 2025	2.72	March 24, 2025	3.22	—N/a	2024–25	TBA	TBA

== Questions of authenticity ==
On February 26, 2009, in an exclusive interview between The Bachelor season 13 contestant Megan Parris and Steve Carbone, Megan commented that the producers edit the footage to create a fictional storyline:

I don't think [the producers] showed any real conversation I had with anyone ... The viewers fail to realize that editing is what makes the show ... You'll hear someone make one comment and then they'll show a clip of somebody's face to make it look like that is their facial reaction to that statement, but really, somebody made that face the day before to something else. It's just piecing things together to make a story.

On March 26, 2009, Megan Parris argued that not only was the show scripted, but that producers bullied contestants into saying things to the camera that contestants did not want to say. "There's nothing real about it," she said of the show's trademark "confessionals," in which contestants talk to the camera about the latest goings-on. "It is scripted," she said. "They basically will call you names, berate you, curse at you until they get you to say what they want you to say." Both ABC and Warner Bros., the studio that produces The Bachelor, had no comment.

On March 15, 2010, Mike Fleiss appeared on 20/20 and said that he develops contestants into characters who will cater to his audience's tastes and that they "need [their] fair share of villains every season." Fleiss has come under fire for admitting that The Bachelor has less to do with reality than it does making good television.

On February 24, 2012, during the taping of the Women Tell All episode of The Bachelor, a private conversation between contestant Courtney Robertson and a show producer went public when microphones were accidentally left on in between camera takes. The conversation revealed the producer had a role as a coach, encouraging Robertson to fake certain emotions for the camera.

The audience reactions for The Women Tell All episode are pre-recorded and inserted into the show later.

=== Lawsuits ===
In December 2011, a producer of The Bachelor sued Steve Carbone, the proprietor of the website RealitySteve.com, for leaking unreleased information about the show, claiming Carbone encouraged contestants of both The Bachelor and The Bachelorette to break their confidentiality agreements. Carbone has denied that the source of the leaks are current contestants. Despite the first two lawsuits in 2012 being settled out of court, a further lawsuit was presented against Carbone in 2017.

== Criticism ==
The franchise has long been criticized for its lack of ethnic and cultural diversity, eventually prompting petitions and threats of boycott from the franchise's only black lead at the time, Rachel Lindsay. In June 2020, the show cast Matt James as its first black male lead for season 25. James was initially cast for Clare Crawley's season of Bachelorette, which was delayed due to COVID-19. In June 2021, it was announced that long-time host Chris Harrison was stepping down permanently after widespread criticism of comments he had made which excused the past behavior of a cast member who had been accused of racism, saying he was not the "woke police". Harrison acknowledged, "By excusing historical racism, I defended it."

The show has been criticized for stigmatizing virginity, thus reflecting the patriarchal masculinity stereotypes.

== Spin-offs ==
The program's success has led to the creation of various spin-off series;

- The Bachelorette premiered in 2003 as a female counterpart of The Bachelor, featuring a pool of men competing for a single bachelorette (who is usually a former contestant of The Bachelor). The series first ran from 2003 to 2005, before returning in 2008 after a hiatus.
- Bachelor Pad ran from 2010 to 2012, featuring previous contestants of The Bachelor and The Bachelorette competing in challenges and eliminations to for a chance to win a $250,000 grand prize. In 2013, it was replaced by a similar series, Bachelor in Paradise.
  - The fourth season of Bachelor in Paradise called into question about the future of its production following an issue of possible misconduct on the set. The fourth season premiered on August 8, 2017. Two contestants, Corinne Olympios and DeMario Jackson were involved in an explicit sexual encounter in the pool during the filming of the show and were caught on tape. A producer onset administered a complaint which stated either one or both contestants may have been too drunk to give proper consent for the sexual encounter. This prompted Warner Bros. to start an internal investigation and both contestants to seek legal counsel. Production of the show was halted on June 11, 2017, and all contestants were asked to go home until further notice. Allegations were made against both contestants about their intoxication and actions thereafter but ended with broadcast statements from both contestants during a talk show that it was all a misunderstanding and the two have remained friends since the incident. The show was given the green light to resume filming on June 21, 2017; neither Olympios nor Jackson returned to production.
- The weddings of Trista Rehn (the 1st Bachelorette), Jason Mesnick (13th Bachelor), Ashley Hebert (the 7th Bachelorette), and Sean Lowe (the 17th Bachelor) were broadcast as television specials. Rehn's vow-renewal ceremony upon her 10-year anniversary was also broadcast. Bachelor in Paradise season 2 couple Jade Roper and Tanner Tolbert's wedding was also broadcast as a television special in February 2016. The wedding of Gerry Turner and Theresa Nist (The Golden Bachelor) was televised as a live special on January 4, 2024.
- Sister network Freeform premiered two docusoaps focusing on alumni from the series, Ben and Lauren: Happily Ever After? premiered in October 2016, which showcased the relationship of Ben Higgins and Lauren Bushnell following season 20 of The Bachelor on their plans for marriage and Bushnell's new life in Denver. But then, the couple eventually parted ways on May 15, 2017. In March 2017, Freeform premiered The Twins: Happily Ever After, which featured Haley and Emily Ferguson from season 20 of The Bachelor.
- The Bachelor Winter Games premiered on February 13, 2018, as a winter sports-themed spin-off (airing against the 2018 Winter Olympics), with a similar format to Bachelor in Paradise featuring contestants from domestic and international alumni of the franchise, and winter sports challenges. The series was won by Ashley Iaconetti (United States) and Kevin Wendt (Canada), after finishing first in a figure skating competition among the final four couples. In 2020, ABC announced plans to produce a summer counterpart—The Bachelor Summer Games—which would have presumably aired against the 2020 Summer Olympics. On March 30, 2020, due to the COVID-19 pandemic (which itself caused the 2020 Olympics to be postponed to 2021), it was reported that the series had been cancelled and would not be part of the 2020–21 TV season.
- Bachelor Live was a short-lived season 20 after-show hosted by Chris Harrison, discussing events in episodes with cast members and celebrity fans.
- Bachelor Live on Stage was announced on January 23, 2019, during the Men Tell All episode. A local Bachelor would go through group date challenges and coveted one-on-ones with local ladies in the audience. Audience members and hosts would assist the Bachelor. Ben Higgins and Becca Kufrin are slated to host the planned 63 stop tour starting in Mesa, Arizona on February 13, 2020, with the tour interrupted in Minneapolis, Minnesota on March 11, 2020. The COVID-19 pandemic caused subsequent shows have been postponed including the scheduled final stop in Austin, Texas on May 17, 2020, the dates were initially rescheduled to January 24, 2021, in Cleveland, Ohio before postponed for the second time in 2022 due to the temporary closure of entertainment venues and the second wave of the virus in late 2020. It was announced on October 27, 2021, that it would resume on March 16, 2022, in Peoria, Illinois after more than two years of entertainment closures in related to the pandemic. Kufrin returned as host and now be the sole host of the show. In February 2022, it was announced that former Bachelorette contestants James Bonsall (season 17), Rick Leach (season 18), Connor Brennan (season 17), Ivan Hall (season 16), Justin Glaze (season 17), Andrew Spencer (season 17), and Rodney Matthews (season 18) would all be joining the tour as special guests for different tour stops.
- The Bachelor Presents: Listen to Your Heart premiered on April 13, 2020, which featured a cast of musicians and related figures, participating in music-related challenges and dates.
- The Bachelor: The Greatest Seasons – Ever!, aired in 2020 as a replacement for The Bachelorette due to the COVID-19 pandemic, featuring recaps of previous seasons.
- The Golden Bachelor premiered on September 28, 2023 as a senior-centric spin-off, featuring a 72-year-old as the single man. ABC would premiere a female counterpar—The Golden Bachelorette—in 2024.
- Bachelor Mansion Takeover was announced in 2025 as a spin-off for HGTV (owned by Warner Horizon parent company Warner Bros. Discovery), which will feature alumni of the franchise competing to renovate the series' mansion.

== Parodies ==
The show was parodied in S1E5 of the Comedy Central TV show Nathan for You. Ben Stiller produced a web spoof of the series titled Burning Love.

In 2013, ABC's late-night talk show Jimmy Kimmel Live! parodied the series as The Baby Bachelor, a sketch where the titular role is given to host Jimmy Kimmel's three-year-old nephew Wesley. Later episodes featured follow-up sketches such as Baby Bachelorette and Baby Bachelor in Paradise.

The Fox network produced a show, Joe Millionaire, based on the premise that the bachelor was a millionaire heir, when in reality, he was not.

On June 1, 2015, Lifetime began airing Unreal, a scripted drama about a producer who works on Everlasting, a fictional reality series similar to The Bachelor. It is based on Sarah Gertrude Shapiro's short film Sequin Raze and her experience as a field producer on The Bachelor.

In 2017 and 2018, Wong Fu Productions created two eight- to ten-minute parodies of the Bachelorette called "The Asian Bachelorette", which humorously depicts Asian stereotypes and also acts as increased representation of Asian diaspora in the media.

The series was parodied in the third season of the reality series RuPaul's Drag Race All Stars as "The Bitchelor", where a titular challenge featured the drag performers portraying contestants on a Bachelor-like show with Jeffrey Bowyer-Chapman playing the bachelor.

== See also ==
- Who Wants to Marry a Multi-Millionaire? (2000)
- Joe Millionaire (2003)
- The Littlest Groom (2004)
- Momma's Boys (2008)
- More to Love (2009)
