= MuscleTech =

Dietary supplement brand

- Current owner: Iovate Health Sciences International Inc.
- Introduced: 1995
- Related brands: Hydroxycut
- Website: www.muscletech.com

MuscleTech is a brand of dietary supplements, marketed by Iovate Health Sciences Inc., which includes Hydroxycut. It was owned by Canadian company Kerr Holdings which was acquired by Xiwang Foodstuffs Company, a Chinese company, for $584 million in 2016.

== History ==
In 1998, MuscleTech launched Cell-Tech, a creatine-carbohydrate-alpha lipoic acid supplement.

In September 2018, Muscletech is partnering up to Rob Gronkowski to create a high-protein candy bar. In October 2018, MuscleTech partnered with Homes For Our Troops.

In April 2019, MuscleTech had partnered up with Tough Mudder. In July 2019, MuscleTech launched the Prime Series, a private label sports nutrition line exclusive to Amazon.

In April 2021, MuscleTech is announced the addition of a new general manager. MuscleTech, through its parent company Iovate Health Sciences, is a partner of the Metabolism & Sports Science Lab at the University of Toronto.

In February 2022, MuscleTech announced they are looking for their next Brand Superstar.

In April 2024, Muscletech and Trust Group came to an agreement for Trust Group to manufacture and market MuscleTech products in the Brazilian market.

== Controversies ==
In December 2015, a settlement was reached that applies to protein shakes and beverages that include MuscleTech.

In June 2016, MuscleTech's parent Iovate was sued by rival Hi-Tech Pharmaceuticals over Racketeer Influenced and Corrupt Organizations and protein spiking allegations.

In September 2019, MuscleTech was sued by a consumer claiming that a MuscleTech dietary supplement (Platinum 100% BCAA 8:1:1) decreased muscle protein synthesis.

In May 2020, a MuscleTech product made in the U.S. was linked to a death in Spain.

In April 2022, a lawsuit was filed alleging containers of MuscleTech powder supplements were sold half empty.

In June 2025, Malaysian bodybuilding supplement retailer Muscle Mania Club claimed that there are only 9.9g of protein in Nitro-Tech, well below the 30g of protein claimed on the bottle, after they sent a sample for a third party lab testing done in Malaysia. Iovate responded by producing its own test results done by Eurofins that showed protein content meeting the 30g label claim and added that Muscle Mania Club is not an authorized MuscleTech reseller.
