= Michelle Collins (comedian) =

American comedian and talk show host

- Born: Michelle Elizabeth Cikk; July 9, 1981 (age 45); Miami Beach, Florida, U.S.
- Education: Barnard College (BA)
- Occupations: Comedian, talk show host, writer
- Years active: 2004–present

Michelle Elizabeth Collins (née Cikk; born July 9, 1981) is an American comedian and talk show host. Collins came into the entertainment industry as the managing editor of VH1's bestweekever.tv, a pop culture website that tied into the series of the same name. The site earned her two Webby Awards for Best Celebrity Fan Blog. In 2010, Collins joined as a co-host on the new LOGO/VH1 show The Gossip Queens, which was also in limited syndication. She joined The View on July 13, 2015, for the 19th season as a co-host. She was let go on June 3, 2016. She hosted her own Sirius XM talk show, The Michelle Collins Show, from 2018 until 2022.

== Early life and education ==
Collins was born on July 9, 1981 in Miami Beach, Florida as Michelle Elizabeth Cikk to Judy and Mel Collins, who changed their names when she was a young girl. She has an older brother. Her parents are of Eastern European Jewish descent. She attended Barnard College in New York City, but did not graduate due to not fulfilling the foreign language requirement.

== Career ==
Collins worked as a legal assistant prior to becoming a comedian.

Collins started as managing editor for VH1's Best Week Ever website for six years. According to Collins, she broke the story of Jared Fogle's early pornography business during her time writing for the website. She also covered major events such as the Wimbledon Championships, the Oscars and the Olympics for Vanity Fair. She also contributed to Elle. Before joining The View, Collins made regular appearances as a panelist on Chelsea Lately, The Joy Behar Show, The Tyra Banks Show, Red Eye w/ Greg Gutfeld, The Wendy Williams Show, and various VH1 productions. She also had her own web talk show, Martini Minute, on which she has interviewed celebrities such as Adam Lambert, New Kids on the Block, Travie McCoy, and Jessica Simpson. Collins also appeared on and wrote for Kathy Griffin's talk show. In 2009, she won the ECNY Award for Best Female Standup Comedian in New York, and in the same year she was featured as a "Comedian to Watch" in the magazine YRB. In 2010, she won LOGO's NewNowNext Award for "Breakout Comic".

Collins also performed standup comedy, which she described as "mostly off the cuff and not written".

=== The View ===
On July 13, 2015, after making several appearances from February of that year, Collins was announced to have signed on as a co-host on The View for the nineteenth season. At the time, Collins stated that she had wanted to be on the show since she was four years old. During Collins' tenure on The View, the show was experiencing low ratings and staff turmoil. The show brought in new management and introduced new segment formats, as well as an emphasis on politics due to the 2016 election. According to Variety, the new managers did not like Collins' hosting style, which included personal anecdotes, and Collins' subject expertise did not fit with the new political bent of the show. In 2004, Collins co-founded voter mobilization group, Votergasm.org. Collins also received negative audience feedback for two on-air incidents, where she criticized nurses in October 2015, and joked on a segment that presidential candidate Carly Fiorina's face looked "demented" when smiling during a Republican presidential primary debate. By January, Collins' appearances on the show were reduced to one or two segments a week.

On June 3, 2016, it was announced that Collins was fired from The View, effective immediately. Collins made a statement confirming her departure from the show on June 17, 2016.

=== After The View, Radio shows ===
On July 13, 2016, a new show hosted by Collins was released on ABC Digital titled All My Gay Friends Are Getting Married. Collins was also announced as the host of After Paradise, the live after-show of Bachelor in Paradise. Additionally, she hosted two shows on Lifetime TV: Little Talk Live and Date Night Live. On July 8, 2018, Collins became the host of the new TLC Channel show "90 Day Live". "90 Day Live" is a recep/review show that takes place directly after the weekly show "90 Day Fiancée: Happily Ever After?" on TLC. The show features Michelle giving a recap of that week's show events along with special guests. Collins also appears as a guest host on the Today Show.

In March 2018, she began her daily SiriusXM morning show The Michelle Collins Show on the Sirius XM Stars channel. The radio show covers pop culture and entertainment, and included interviews with celebrity guests, newsmakers, experts, and reality TV stars. In August 2021, she started broadcasting on the Radio Andy channel on Sirius XM. Collins hosts a podcast, Midnight Snack with Michelle Collins, which succeeded her previous podcasts Fresh Batch and Edit That Out.

On October 21, 2022, the final episode of her SiriusXM show aired. Soon after she relaunched The Michelle Collins Show radio show on paid-subscription service Patreon.

Since 2025, Collins has guest co-hosted the third hour of Today with Jenna & Friends on NBC.

== Awards and nominations ==
Year	Award	Category	Result	Ref.
2016	Daytime Emmy Awards	Outstanding Entertainment Talk Show Host (shared with Joy Behar, Candace Cameron Bure, Paula Faris, Whoopi Goldberg, Rosie Perez, Raven-Symoné, and Nicolle Wallace)	Nominated	

Media offices
Preceded by Rosie Perez; Nicolle Wallace	The View co-host 2015–2016	Succeeded by Jedediah Bila; Sara Haines; Sunny Hostin
