= List of The Bachelor (American TV series) episodes =

The Bachelor is an American dating reality television series created for ABC by Mike Fleiss. It was hosted by Chris Harrison for the first twenty-five seasons, former Bachelor Jesse Palmer returning to The Bachelor franchise as the host from season twenty-six. The series is produced by Next Entertainment and Warner Horizon Television and revolves around a single bachelor who starts with a pool of romantic interests from whom he is expected to select a wife. During the course of the season, the bachelor eliminates candidates, culminating in a marriage proposal to his final selection. The participants travel to romantic and exotic locations for their adventures, and the conflicts in the series, both internal and external, stem from the elimination-style format of the show.

As of March 23, 2025, 306 episodes of The Bachelor have aired, including twelve specials, concluding the twenty-ninth season. On June 30, 2025, the series was renewed for a thirtieth season, which is scheduled to premiere on March 21, 2027. The twenty-ninth season is the most recent season premiered on January 27, 2025.

== Series overview ==
Season	Bachelor	Episodes	Originally released		Rank	Average viewers (in millions)
Season	Bachelor	Episodes	First released	Last released	Rank	Average viewers (in millions)
1	Alex Michel	7	March 25, 2002	April 25, 2002	—N/a	—N/a
2	Aaron Buerge	9	September 25, 2002	November 20, 2002	—N/a	—N/a
3	Andrew Firestone	10	March 26, 2003	May 21, 2003	—N/a	—N/a
4	Bob Guiney	10	September 24, 2003	November 20, 2003	—N/a	—N/a
5	Jesse Palmer	9	April 7, 2004	May 26, 2004	—N/a	—N/a
6	Byron Velvick	10	September 22, 2004	November 24, 2004	—N/a	—N/a
7	Charlie O'Connell	8	March 28, 2005	May 16, 2005	—N/a	—N/a
8	Travis Lane Stork	8	January 9, 2006	February 27, 2006	57	9.32
9	Lorenzo Borghese	8	October 2, 2006	November 27, 2006	83	8.45
10	Andrew Baldwin	9	April 7, 2007	May 22, 2007	52	10.37
11	Brad Womack	10	September 24, 2007	November 20, 2007	49	9.72
12	Matt Grant	9	March 17, 2008	May 12, 2008	85	7.86
13	Jason Mesnick	11	January 5, 2009	March 3, 2009	24	11.53
14	Jake Pavelka	10	January 4, 2010	March 1, 2010	23	12.23
15	Brad Womack	12	January 3, 2011	March 14, 2011	35	10.79
16	Ben Flajnik	12	January 2, 2012	March 12, 2012	49	8.85
17	Sean Lowe	13	January 7, 2013	March 11, 2013	41	9.48
18	Juan Pablo Galavis	12	January 6, 2014	March 10, 2014	32	9.59
19	Chris Soules	13	January 5, 2015	March 9, 2015	46	9.68
20	Ben Higgins	12	January 4, 2016	March 14, 2016	41	9.53
21	Nick Viall	13	January 2, 2017	March 13, 2017	33	9.00
22	Arie Luyendyk Jr.	12	January 1, 2018	March 6, 2018	47	7.93
23	Colton Underwood	12	January 7, 2019	March 12, 2019	47	7.92
24	Peter Weber	12	January 6, 2020	March 10, 2020	35	7.93
25	Matt James	12	January 4, 2021	March 15, 2021	37	6.46
26	Clayton Echard	12	January 3, 2022	March 15, 2022	53	4.53
27	Zach Shallcross	11	January 23, 2023	March 27, 2023	63	3.77
28	Joey Graziadei	11	January 22, 2024	March 25, 2024	TBA	TBA
29	Grant Ellis	9	January 27, 2025	March 24, 2025	TBA	TBA

== Episodes ==
=== Season 1 (2002) ===
No. overall	No. in season	Title	Original release date	Prod. code	U.S. viewers (millions)	Rating/share (18–49)
1	1	"Week 1"	March 25, 2002	101	9.90	4.0/0
2	2	"Week 2"	April 1, 2002	102	10.20	4.4/11
3	3	"Week 3"	April 8, 2002	103	9.40	4.2/10
4	4	"Week 4"	April 15, 2002	104	11.10	4.6/12
5	5	"Week 5"	April 22, 2002	105	13.10	5.7/14
6	6	"The Women Tell All"	April 25, 2002	N/A	10.80	3.6/9
7	7	"Week 6"	April 25, 2002	106	18.20	7.3/17

=== Season 2 (2002) ===
No. overall	No. in season	Title	Original release date	Prod. code	U.S. viewers (millions)	Rating/share (18–49)
8	1	"Revealed"	September 25, 2002	200	8.90	N/A
9	2	"Week 1"	October 2, 2002	201	11.00	4.9/12
10	3	"Week 2"	October 9, 2002	202	12.80	6.4/16
11	4	"Week 3"	October 16, 2002	203	12.60	5.9/15
12	5	"Week 4"	October 23, 2002	204	14.90	7.0/17
13	6	"Week 5"	October 30, 2002	205	15.00	7.3/18
14	7	"Week 6"	November 6, 2002	206	16.30	7.8/18
15	8	"The Women Tell All"	November 13, 2002	N/A	16.80	7.7/19
16	9	"Week 7"	November 20, 2002	207	25.90	11.9/28

=== Season 3 (2003) ===
No. overall	No. in season	Title	Original release date	Prod. code	U.S. viewers (millions)	Rating/share (18–49)
17	1	"Revealed"	March 26, 2003	301	N/A	N/A
18	2	"Week 1"	April 2, 2003	302	10.20	5.0/12
19	3	"Week 2"	April 9, 2003	303	11.20	5.4/14
20	4	"Week 3 & 4"	April 16, 2003	304	11.50	5.6/15
21	5	"Week 5"	April 23, 2003	305	12.93	6.2/15
22	6	"Week 6"	April 30, 2003	306	13.30	6.4/16
23	7	"Week 7"	May 7, 2003	307	13.50	6.6/16
24	8	"The Women Tell All"	May 14, 2003	N/A	10.10	4.7/11
25	9	"Week 8"	May 18, 2003	308	15.10	7.2/17
26	10	"After the Final Rose"	May 21, 2003	N/A	9.30	N/A

=== Season 4 (2003) ===
No. overall	No. in season	Title	Original release date	Prod. code	U.S. viewers (millions)	Rating/share (18–49)
27	1	"Week 1"	September 24, 2003	401	12.55	6.0/16
28	2	"Week 2"	October 1, 2003	402	10.13	4.8/11
29	3	"Week 3"	October 8, 2003	403	12.86	6.1/15
30	4	"Week 4"	October 15, 2003	404	11.96	5.7/14
31	5	"Week 5"	October 22, 2003	405	13.58	6.6/16
32	6	"Week 6"	October 29, 2003	406	13.85	6.3/16
33	7	"Week 7"	November 5, 2003	407	13.49	6.1/15
34	8	"The Women Tell All"	November 12, 2003	N/A	12.45	5.6/14
35	9	"Week 8"	November 19, 2003	408	18.62	8.8/21
36	10	"After the Final Rose"	November 20, 2003	N/A	9.30	N/A

=== Season 5 (2004) ===
No. overall	No. in season	Title	Original release date	Prod. code	U.S. viewers (millions)	Rating/share (18–49)
37	1	"Week 1"	March 31, 2004	501	11.08	5.2/14
38	2	"Week 2"	April 7, 2004	502	10.47	4.6/12
39	3	"Week 3"	April 14, 2004	503	11.95	5.3/13
40	4	"Week 4"	April 21, 2004	504	11.62	5.0/13
41	5	"Week 5"	April 28, 2004	505	10.33	4.7/12
42	6	"The Women Tell All"	May 5, 2004	N/A	9.28	4.2/10
43	7	"Week 6"	May 12, 2004	506	12.45	6.0/15
44	8	"Week 7"	May 19, 2004	507	13.07	6.0/15
45	9	"After the Final Rose"	May 26, 2004	N/A	7.50	N/A

=== Season 6 (2004) ===
No. overall	No. in season	Title	Original release date	Prod. code	U.S. viewers (millions)	Rating/share (18–49)
46	1	"Week 1"	September 22, 2004	601	8.20	3.7/10
47	2	"Week 2"	September 29, 2004	602	7.84	3.3/8
48	3	"Week 3"	October 6, 2004	603	8.50	3.6/9
49	4	"Week 4"	October 20, 2004	604	8.36	3.5/8
50	5	"Week 5"	October 27, 2004	605	8.40	3.5/8
51	6	"Week 6"	November 3, 2004	606	9.00	3.9/8
52	7	"Week 7"	November 10, 2004	607	9.70	3.9/9
53	8	"The Women Tell All"	November 17, 2004	N/A	8.60	3.7/9
54	9	"Week 8"	November 24, 2004	608	10.00	3.8/11
55	10	"After the Final Rose"	November 24, 2004	N/A	10.20	4.1/12

=== Season 7 (2005) ===
No. overall	No. in season	Title	Original release date	Prod. code	U.S. viewers (millions)	Rating/share (18–49)
56	1	"Week 1"	March 28, 2005	701	8.23	3.7/9
57	2	"Week 2"	April 4, 2005	702	7.82	3.2/8
58	3	"Week 3"	April 11, 2005	703	7.39	3.3/8
59	4	"Week 4"	April 18, 2005	704	7.50	3.4/8
60	5	"Week 5"	April 25, 2005	705	8.09	3.4/8
61	6	"Week 6"	May 2, 2005	706	8.16	3.4/8
62	7	"The Women Tell All"	May 9, 2005	N/A	7.11	2.9/7
63	8	"Season Finale; The Final Rose Live"	May 16, 2005	707	9.27	3.9/10

=== Season 8: Paris (2006) ===
No. overall	No. in season	Title	Original release date	Prod. code	U.S. viewers (millions)	Rating/share (18–49)
64	1	"Week 1"	January 9, 2006	801	6.24	2.7/7
65	2	"Week 2"	January 16, 2006	802	7.76	3.6/9
66	3	"Week 3"	January 23, 2006	803	8.42	4.0/10
67	4	"Week 4"	January 30, 2006	804	8.49	4.0/10
68	5	"Week 5"	February 6, 2006	805	9.68	4.3/10
69	6	"Week 6"	February 13, 2006	806	9.21	4.2/10
70	7	"The Women Tell All"	February 20, 2006	N/A	8.62	4.0/9
71	8	"Week 7"	February 27, 2006	807	11.53	5.1/12

=== Season 9: Rome (2006) ===
No. overall	No. in season	Title	Original release date	Prod. code	U.S. viewers (millions)	Rating/share (18–49)
72	1	"Week 1"	October 2, 2006	901	7.53	3.1/8
73	2	"Week 2"	October 9, 2006	902	7.93	3.1/7
74	3	"Week 3"	October 16, 2006	903	8.66	3.3/8
75	4	"Week 4"	October 23, 2006	904	8.18	3.2/8
76	5	"Week 5"	October 30, 2006	905	7.77	3.1/7
77	6	"Week 6"	November 6, 2006	906	8.35	3.3/8
78	7	"The Women Tell All"	November 13, 2006	N/A	7.40	2.7/6
79	8	"Week 7"	November 20, 2006	907	9.85	3.9/9
80	9	"Week 8"	November 27, 2006	908	N/A	TBA

=== Season 10: Officer and a Gentleman (2007) ===
No. overall	No. in season	Title	Original release date	Prod. code	U.S. viewers (millions)	Rating/share (18–49)
80	1	"Week 1"	April 2, 2007	1001	9.86	3.7/9
81	2	"Week 2"	April 9, 2007	1002	9.06	3.4/9
82	3	"Week 3"	April 16, 2007	1003	9.03	3.5/9
83	4	"Week 4"	April 23, 2007	1004	9.13	3.4/9
84	5	"Week 5"	April 30, 2007	1005	9.80	3.7/10
85	6	"Week 6"	May 7, 2007	1006	10.39	3.7/10
86	7	"Week 7"	May 14, 2007	1007	10.64	4.0/10
87	8	"Week 8"	May 21, 2007	1008	12.67	4.8/12
88	9	"After the Final Rose"	May 22, 2007	N/A	8.00	N/A

=== Season 11 (2007) ===
No. overall	No. in season	Title	Original release date	Prod. code	U.S. viewers (millions)	Rating/share (18–49)
89	1	"Week 1"	September 24, 2007	1101	9.23	3.5/9
90	2	"Week 2"	October 1, 2007	1102	8.85	3.4/9
91	3	"Week 3"	October 8, 2007	1103	8.82	3.2/8
92	4	"Week 4"	October 15, 2007	1104	8.93	3.4/9
93	5	"Week 5"	October 22, 2007	1105	8.92	3.3/8
94	6	"Week 6"	October 29, 2007	1106	9.76	3.6/9
95	7	"Week 7"	November 5, 2007	1107	9.23	3.4/9
96	8	"The Women Tell All"	November 12, 2007	N/A	8.96	3.3/9
97	9	"Week 8"	November 19, 2007	1108	11.22	4.2/11
98	10	"After the Final Rose"	November 20, 2007	N/A	12.30	4.1/11

=== Season 12: London Calling (2008) ===
No. overall	No. in season	Title	Original release date	Prod. code	U.S. viewers (millions)	Rating/share (18–49)
99	1	"Week 1"	March 17, 2008	1201	8.58	3.2/8
100	2	"Week 2"	March 24, 2008	1202	7.27	2.6/7
101	3	"Week 3"	March 31, 2008	1203	7.67	2.7/7
102	4	"Week 4"	April 7, 2008	1204	6.83	2.5/6
103	5	"Week 5"	April 14, 2008	1205	6.60	2.5/6
104	6	"Week 6: Hometowns"	April 21, 2008	1206	7.30	2.6/7
105	7	"Week 7: Fantasy Suites"	April 28, 2008	1207	7.17	2.5/6
106	8	"The Women Tell All"	May 5, 2008	N/A	6.57	2.3/6
107	9	"Week 8: Season Finale"	May 12, 2008	1208	8.85	3.2/8

=== Season 13 (2009) ===
No. overall	No. in season	Title	Original release date	Prod. code	U.S. viewers (millions)	Rating/share (18–49)
108	1	"Week 1"	January 5, 2009	1301	8.74	3.1/8
109	2	"Week 2"	January 12, 2009	1302	9.06	3.2/8
110	3	"Week 3"	January 19, 2009	1303	9.95	3.6/8
111	4	"Week 4"	January 26, 2009	1304	10.57	4.0/10
112	5	"Week 5"	February 2, 2009	1305	11.02	4.1/10
113	6	"Week 6: Hometowns"	February 9, 2009	1306	11.59	4.2/10
114	7	"Week 7: Fantasy Suites"	February 16, 2009	1307	12.52	4.4/10
115	8	"The Women Tell All"	February 23, 2009	N/A	10.93	3.7/9
116	9	"Week 8: Season Finale"	March 2, 2009	1308	15.48	5.4/13
117	10	"After the Final Rose, Part 1"	March 2, 2009	N/A	17.47	6.7/16
118	11	"After the Final Rose, Part 2"	March 3, 2009	N/A	10.90	4.1/11

=== Season 14: On the Wings of Love (2010) ===
No. overall	No. in season	Title	Original release date	Prod. code	U.S. viewers (millions)	Rating/share (18–49)
119	1	"Week 1"	January 4, 2010	1401	9.54	3.3/8
120	2	"Week 2"	January 11, 2010	1402	10.50	3.6/9
121	3	"Week 3"	January 18, 2010	1403	10.66	3.8/9
122	4	"Week 4"	January 25, 2010	1404	11.47	3.9/10
123	5	"Week 5"	February 1, 2010	1405	11.73	4.1/10
124	6	"Week 6: Hometowns"	February 8, 2010	1406	12.35	4.1/10
125	7	"Week 7: Fantasy Suites"	February 15, 2010 (Note: Week 7 and Week 8: The Women Tell All were aired during the 2010 Winter Olympics.)	1407	11.53	4.1/10
126	8	"The Women Tell All"	February 22, 2010	N/A	11.27	3.9/10
127	9	"Week 8: Season Finale"	March 1, 2010	1408	15.15	5.3/14
128	10	"After the Final Rose"	March 1, 2010	N/A	13.91	5.3/14

=== Season 15 (2011) ===
No. overall	No. in season	Title	Original release date	Prod. code	U.S. viewers (millions)	Rating/share (18–49)
129	1	"Week 1: Season Premiere"	January 3, 2011	1501	9.04	2.9/7
130	2	"Week 2"	January 10, 2011	1502	8.46	2.8/7
131	3	"Week 3"	January 17, 2011	1503	8.80	2.7/7
132	4	"Week 4"	January 24, 2011	1504	9.28	2.9/8
133	5	"Week 5: Las Vegas"	January 31, 2011	1505	9.66	3.2/8
134	6	"Week 6: Costa Rica"	February 7, 2011	1506	9.81	3.2/8
135	7	"Week 7: Anguilla"	February 14, 2011	1507	9.32	2.9/8
136	8	"Week 8: Hometowns"	February 21, 2011	1508	10.41	3.4/9
137	9	"Week 9: Fantasy Suites"	February 28, 2011	1509	11.33	3.5/9
138	10	"The Women Tell All"	March 7, 2011	N/A	10.02	3.1/9
139	11	"Week 10: Season Finale"	March 14, 2011	1510	13.86	4.5/13
140	12	"After The Final Rose"	March 14, 2011	N/A	13.96	4.7/13

=== Season 16 (2012) ===
No. overall	No. in season	Title	Original release date	Prod. code	U.S. viewers (millions)	Rating/share (18–49)
141	1	"Week 1: Season Premiere"	January 2, 2012	1601	7.78	2.4/6
142	2	"Week 2: Sonoma"	January 9, 2012	1602	7.31	2.2/5
143	3	"Week 3: San Francisco"	January 16, 2012	1603	7.43	2.4/6
144	4	"Week 4: Park City, Utah"	January 23, 2012	1604	8.30	2.7/7
145	5	"Week 5: Puerto Rico"	January 30, 2012	1605	8.17	2.6/7
146	6	"Week 6: Panama"	February 6, 2012	1606	8.35	2.6/7
147	7	"Week 7: Belize"	February 13, 2012	1607	8.09	2.5/6
148	8	"Week 8: Hometowns"	February 20, 2012	1608	8.18	2.5/6
149	9	"Week 9: Fantasy Suites"	February 27, 2012	1609	8.05	2.6/6
150	10	"The Women Tell All"	March 5, 2012	N/A	8.19	2.5/6
151	11	"Week 10: Season Finale"	March 12, 2012	1610	9.23	2.9/8
152	12	"After the Final Rose"	March 12, 2012	N/A	9.87	3.3/8

=== Season 17 (2013) ===
No. overall	No. in season	Title	Original release date	Prod. code	U.S. viewers (millions)	Rating/share (18–49)
153	1	"Week 1: Season Premiere"	January 7, 2013	1701	6.92	2.3/6
154	2	"Week 2"	January 14, 2013	1702	7.49	2.5/6
155	3	"Week 3"	January 21, 2013	1703	7.57	2.5/6
156	4	"Week 4"	January 28, 2013	1704	7.90	2.5/7
157	5	"Week 5: Whitefish, Montana"	February 4, 2013	1705	7.90	2.4/6
158	6	"Week 6: Banff, Canada"	February 5, 2013	1706	7.87	2.7/7
159	7	"Week 7: St. Croix"	February 11, 2013	1707	8.48	2.7/7
160	8	"Week 8: Hometowns"	February 18, 2013	1708	9.26	3.0/8
161	9	"Sean Tells All"	February 19, 2013	N/A	8.11	2.6/7
162	10	"Week 9: Fantasy Suites"	February 25, 2013	1709	9.23	2.9/8
163	11	"The Women Tell All"	March 4, 2013	N/A	8.53	2.8/7
164	12	"Week 10: Season Finale"	March 11, 2013	1710	10.42	3.5/10
165	13	"After the Final Rose"	March 11, 2013	N/A	10.81	3.8/10

=== Season 18 (2014) ===
No. overall	No. in season	Title	Original release date	Prod. code	U.S. viewers (millions)	Rating/share (18–49)
166	1	"Week 1: Season Premiere"	January 6, 2014	1801	8.65	2.7/7
167	2	"Week 2"	January 13, 2014	1802	7.96	2.3/6
168	3	"Week 3"	January 20, 2014	1803	7.94	2.3/6
169	4	"Week 4: Seoul, South Korea"	January 27, 2014	1804	8.61	2.5/7
170	5	"Week 5: Vietnam"	February 3, 2014	1805	8.33	2.6/7
171	6	"Week 6: New Zealand"	February 10, 2014 (Note: Week 6: New Zealand and Week 7: Miami, Florida were aired during the 2014 Winter Olympics.)	1806	7.87	2.3/6
172	7	"Week 7: Miami, Florida"	February 17, 2014	1807	7.68	2.2/6
173	8	"Week 8: Hometowns"	February 24, 2014	1808	8.17	2.5/7
174	9	"Week 9: Fantasy Suites"	February 25, 2014	1809	8.13	2.5/7
175	10	"The Women Tell All"	March 3, 2014	N/A	8.15	2.3/6
176	11	"Week 10: Season Finale"	March 10, 2014	1810	10.10	3.3/10
177	12	"After the Final Rose"	March 10, 2014	N/A	10.97	3.8/11

=== Season 19 (2015) ===
No. overall	No. in season	Title	Original release date	Prod. code	U.S. viewers (millions)	Rating/share (18–49)
178	1	"Week 1: Season Premiere"	January 5, 2015	1901	7.76	2.2/7
179	2	"Week 2"	January 12, 2015	1902	6.48	1.8/5
180	3	"Week 3"	January 19, 2015	1903	7.61	2.1/6
181	4	"Week 4"	January 26, 2015	1904	7.95	2.3/6
182	5	"Week 5: Santa Fe, New Mexico"	February 2, 2015	1905	8.45	2.5/7
183	6	"Week 6: Deadwood, South Dakota"	February 9, 2015	1906	8.70	2.7/8
184	7	"Chris Tells All"	February 15, 2015	N/A	5.67	1.5/4
185	8	"Week 7: Iowa"	February 15, 2015	1907	6.05	1.5/4
186	9	"Week 8: Hometowns"	February 16, 2015	1908	8.97	2.6/7
187	10	"Week 9: Fantasy Suites"	February 23, 2015	1909	8.97	2.6/7
188	11	"The Women Tell All"	March 2, 2015	N/A	8.15	2.4/7
189	12	"Week 10: Season Finale"	March 9, 2015	1910	9.68	2.7/8
190	13	"After the Final Rose"	March 9, 2015	N/A	9.68	2.8/8

=== Season 20 (2016) ===
No. overall	No. in season	Title	Original release date	Prod. code	U.S. viewers (millions)	Rating/share (18–49)
191	1	"Week 1: Season Premiere"	January 4, 2016	2001	7.55	2.2/7
192	2	"Week 2"	January 11, 2016	2002	6.90	2.0/6
193	3	"Week 3"	January 18, 2016	2003	7.56	2.2/6
194	4	"Week 4: Las Vegas"	January 25, 2016	2004	7.73	2.3/7
195	5	"Week 5: Mexico City"	February 1, 2016	2005	7.50	2.3/7
196	6	"Week 6: The Bahamas"	February 8, 2016	2006	8.62	2.5/8
197	7	"Week 7: Warsaw, Indiana"	February 15, 2016	2007	7.24	2.2/6
198	8	"Week 8: Hometowns"	February 22, 2016	2008	8.67	2.5/8
199	9	"Week 9: Fantasy Suites"	February 29, 2016	2009	8.17	2.5/8
200	10	"The Women Tell All"	March 7, 2016	N/A	7.48	2.2/7
201	11	"Week 10: Season Finale"	March 14, 2016	2010	9.58	2.9/9
202	12	"After the Final Rose"	March 14, 2016	N/A	9.24	2.6/9

=== Season 21 (2017) ===
No. overall	No. in season	Title	Original release date	Prod. code	U.S. viewers (millions)	Rating/share (18–49)
203	1	"Week 1: Season Premiere"	January 2, 2017	2101	6.62	2.1/6
204	2	"Week 2"	January 9, 2017	2102	6.54	2.1/6
205	3	"Week 3"	January 16, 2017	2103	7.11	2.3/7
206	4	"Week 4: Milwaukee, Wisconsin"	January 23, 2017	2104	7.32	2.4/8
207	5	"Week 5: New Orleans"	January 30, 2017	2105	7.23	2.3/8
208	6	"Week 6: St. Thomas"	February 6, 2017	2106	7.47	2.4/8
209	7	"Week 7: Bimini"	February 13, 2017	2107	7.56	2.4/8
210	8	"Week 8: Hometowns"	February 20, 2017	2108	7.88	2.5/8
211	9	"Week 9: Fantasy Suites, Part 1"	February 27, 2017	2109A	7.71	2.4/9
212	10	"Week 9: Fantasy Suites, Part 2"	March 6, 2017	2109B	7.09	2.2/8
213	11	"The Women Tell All"	March 6, 2017	N/A	5.77	1.8/6
214	12	"Week 10: Season Finale"	March 13, 2017	2110	8.40	2.7/9
215	13	"After the Final Rose"	March 13, 2017	N/A	7.85	2.4/8

=== Season 22 (2018) ===
No. overall	No. in season	Title	Original release date	Prod. code	U.S. viewers (millions)	Rating/share (18–49)
216	1	"Week 1: Season Premiere"	January 1, 2018	2201	5.48	1.5/5
217	2	"Week 2"	January 8, 2018	2202	5.56	1.4/5
218	3	"Week 3"	January 15, 2018	2203	6.61	1.8/6
219	4	"Week 4: Lake Tahoe"	January 22, 2018	2204	6.38	1.8/6
220	5	"Week 5: Fort Lauderdale"	January 29, 2018	2205	6.36	1.7/6
221	6	"Week 6: Paris, France"	February 5, 2018	2206	6.82	1.8/7
222	7	"Week 7: Tuscany, Italy"	February 12, 2018 (Note: Week 7 and Week 8 were aired during the 2018 Winter Olympics.)	2207	5.94	1.5/5
223	8	"Week 8: Hometowns"	February 19, 2018	2208	6.27	1.7/6
224	9	"The Women Tell All"	February 25, 2018	N/A	4.26	1.1/4
225	10	"Week 9: Fantasy Suites"	February 26, 2018	2209	6.57	1.8/7
226	11	"Week 10: Season Finale"	March 5, 2018	2210	7.94	2.2/8
227	12	"After the Final Rose"	March 6, 2018	N/A	7.77	2.2/8

=== Season 23 (2019) ===
No. overall	No. in season	Title	Original release date	Prod. code	U.S. viewers (millions)	Rating/share (18–49)
228	1	"Week 1: Season Premiere"	January 7, 2019	2301	5.13	1.5/6
229	2	"Week 2"	January 14, 2019	2302	5.64	1.7/7
230	3	"Week 3"	January 21, 2019	2303	5.95	1.6/6
231	4	"Week 4: Singapore"	January 28, 2019	2304	6.43	1.8/8
232	5	"Week 5: Thailand"	February 4, 2019	2305	6.23	1.8/8
233	6	"Week 6: Vietnam"	February 11, 2019	2306	6.23	1.9/8
234	7	"Week 7: Denver, Colorado"	February 18, 2019	2307	6.54	1.9/8
235	8	"Week 8: Hometowns"	February 25, 2019	2308	6.74	1.8/8
236	9	"Week 9: Fantasy Suites"	March 4, 2019	2309	7.28	2.0/8
237	10	"The Women Tell All"	March 5, 2019	N/A	6.09	1.6/7
238	11	"Week 10: Season Finale"	March 11, 2019	2310A	8.12	2.3/10
239	12	"After the Final Rose"	March 12, 2019	2310B	8.21	2.4/11

=== Season 24 (2020) ===
No. overall	No. in season	Title	Original release date	Prod. code	U.S. viewers (millions)	Rating/share (18–49)
240	1	"Week 1: Season Premiere"	January 6, 2020	2401	6.07	1.9/9
241	2	"Week 2"	January 13, 2020	2402	5.37	1.6/7
242	3	"Week 3"	January 20, 2020	2403	6.26	1.9/8
243	4	"Week 4: Cleveland, Ohio"	January 27, 2020	2404	5.99	1.6/8
244	5	"Week 5: Costa Rica"	February 3, 2020	2405	5.62	1.5/8
245	6	"Week 6: Chile"	February 5, 2020	2406	5.10	1.3/6
246	7	"Week 7: Lima, Peru"	February 10, 2020	2407	6.39	1.8/9
247	8	"Week 8: Hometowns"	February 17, 2020	2408	6.61	1.8/9
248	9	"Week 9: Fantasy Suites"	February 24, 2020	2409	6.82	1.9/9
249	10	"The Women Tell All"	March 2, 2020	N/A	6.36	1.8/9
250	11	"Week 10: Season Finale"	March 9, 2020	2410A	7.70	2.1/11
251	12	"After the Final Rose"	March 10, 2020	2410B	8.49	2.4/12

=== Season 25 (2021) ===
No. overall	No. in season	Title	Original release date	Prod. code	U.S. viewers (millions)	Rating (18–49)
252	1	"Week 1: Season Premiere"	January 4, 2021	2501	5.23	1.3
253	2	"Week 2"	January 11, 2021	2502	4.74	1.2
254	3	"Week 3"	January 18, 2021	2503	5.00	1.4
255	4	"Week 4"	January 25, 2021	2504	5.25	1.5
256	5	"Week 5"	February 1, 2021	2505	5.49	1.5
257	6	"Week 6"	February 8, 2021	2506	5.47	1.4
258	7	"Week 7"	February 15, 2021	2507	5.51	1.4
259	8	"Week 8: Hometowns"	February 22, 2021	2508	5.40	1.3
260	9	"The Women Tell All"	March 1, 2021	N/A	4.69	1.1
261	10	"Week 9: Fantasy Suites"	March 8, 2021	2509	5.08	1.3
262	11	"Week 10: Season Finale"	March 15, 2021	2510	6.07	1.5
263	12	"After the Final Rose"	March 15, 2021	N/A	5.64	1.4

=== Season 26 (2022) ===
No. overall	No. in season	Title	Original release date	Prod. code	U.S. viewers (millions)	Rating (18–49)
264	1	"Week 1: Season Premiere"	January 3, 2022	2601	3.54	0.8/4
265	2	"Week 2"	January 10, 2022	2602	3.19	0.7/3
266	3	"Week 3"	January 24, 2022	2603	3.61	0.8/4
267	4	"Week 4: Houston, Texas"	January 31, 2022	2604	3.54	0.8/4
268	5	"Week 5: Toronto"	February 7, 2022 (Note: Week 5 and Week 6 were aired during the 2022 Winter Olympics.)	2605	3.14	0.7/3
269	6	"Week 6: Croatia"	February 14, 2022	2606	3.25	0.7/3
270	7	"Week 7: Vienna, Austria"	February 21, 2022	2607	3.49	0.7/3
271	8	"Week 8: Hometowns"	February 28, 2022	2608	3.71	0.8
272	9	"The Women Tell All"	March 7, 2022	N/A	3.63	0.9/7
273	10	"Week 9: Fantasy Suites"	March 8, 2022	2609	3.50	0.8/5
274	11	"Week 10: Season Finale"	March 14, 2022	2610A	4.57	1.1/8
275	12	"After the Final Rose"	March 15, 2022	2610B	4.73	1.1/8

=== Season 27 (2023) ===
No. overall	No. in season	Title	Original release date	Prod. code	U.S. viewers (millions)	Rating (18–49)
276	1	"Week 1: Season Premiere"	January 23, 2023	2701	2.96	0.7
277	2	"Week 2"	January 30, 2023	2702	2.98	0.6
278	3	"Week 3"	February 6, 2023	2703	2.92	0.6
279	4	"Week 4: The Bahamas"	February 13, 2023	2704	2.94	0.6
280	5	"Week 5: London"	February 20, 2023	2705	2.79	0.5
281	6	"Week 6: Estonia"	February 27, 2023	2706	2.98	0.6
282	7	"Week 7: Budapest"	March 6, 2023	2707	3.06	0.6
283	8	"Week 8: Hometowns"	March 13, 2023	2708	3.07	0.5
284	9	"The Women Tell All"	March 14, 2023	N/A	2.48	0.4
285	10	"Week 9: Fantasy Suites"	March 20, 2023	2709	3.26	0.6
286	11	"Week 10: Season Finale & After the Final Rose"	March 27, 2023	2710	3.40	0.6

=== Season 28 (2024) ===
No. overall	No. in season	Title	Original release date	Prod. code	U.S. viewers (millions)	Rating (18–49)
287	1	"Week 1: Season Premiere"	January 22, 2024	2801	3.18	0.5
288	2	"Week 2"	January 29, 2024	2802	3.16	0.6
289	3	"Week 3"	February 5, 2024	2803	3.22	0.6
290	4	"Week 4: Malta"	February 12, 2024	2804	3.49	0.6
291	5	"Week 5: Marbella"	February 13, 2024	2805	3.21	0.6
292	6	"Week 6: Montreal"	February 19, 2024	2806	3.43	0.6
293	7	"Week 7: Jasper"	February 26, 2024	2807	3.60	0.6
294	8	"Week 8: Hometowns"	March 4, 2024	2808	3.62	0.7
295	9	"Week 9: Fantasy Suites"	March 11, 2024	2809	3.79	0.7
296	10	"The Women Tell All"	March 18, 2024	N/A	3.43	0.6
297	11	"Week 10: Season Finale & After the Final Rose"	March 25, 2024	2810	4.14	0.8

=== Season 29 (2025) ===
No. overall	No. in season	Title	Original release date	Prod. code	U.S. viewers (millions)
298	1	"Week 1: Season Premiere"	January 27, 2025	2901	2.72
299	2	"Week 2"	February 3, 2025	2902	2.36
300	3	"Week 3"	February 10, 2025	2903	2.36
301	4	"Week 4: Madrid"	February 17, 2025	2904	2.53
302	5	"Week 5: Scotland"	February 24, 2025	2905	2.51
303	6	"Week 6: Hometowns"	March 3, 2025	2906	2.86
304	7	"The Women Tell All"	March 10, 2025	N/A	2.39
305	8	"Week 7: Fantasy Suites"	March 17, 2025	2907	2.50
306	9	"Week 8: Season Finale & After the Final Rose"	March 24, 2025	2908	3.22

== Specials ==
No.	Title	Original release date	U.S. viewers (millions)	Rating/share (18–49)
Bachelor–2	"Aaron and Helene Tell All"	February 20, 2003	13.50	N/A
Bachelor–3	"Where Are They Now?"	March 19, 2003	9.10	N/A
Bachelor–12	"Where Are They Now?"	March 10, 2008	7.60	N/A
Bachelor–13	"Jason and Molly's Wedding"	March 8, 2010	9.30	N/A
Bachelorette–9	"The Bachelor's Funniest Moments"	May 21, 2013	4.77	1.2/4
Bachelor–18	"The Bachelor: Countdown to Juan Pablo"	December 19, 2013	6.32	1.8/4
Bachelor–18	"Behind the Scenes"	January 7, 2014	3.34	1.0/2
Bachelor–18	"Bachelor Love Stories"	January 19, 2014	3.94	0.9/2
Bachelor–18	"Sean and Catherine's Wedding"	January 26, 2014	6.15	1.5/4
Bachelor–20	"The Bachelor at 20: A Celebration of Love"	February 14, 2016	4.09	1.1/3
Bachelor–21	"Countdown to Nick"	January 1, 2017	3.12	0.8/3
Bachelor–22	"Countdown to Arie"	December 11, 2017	2.53	0.5/2
