= Emerald Cave (Thailand) =

Cave in Thailand

Coordinates: 7.3692°N 99.2838°E

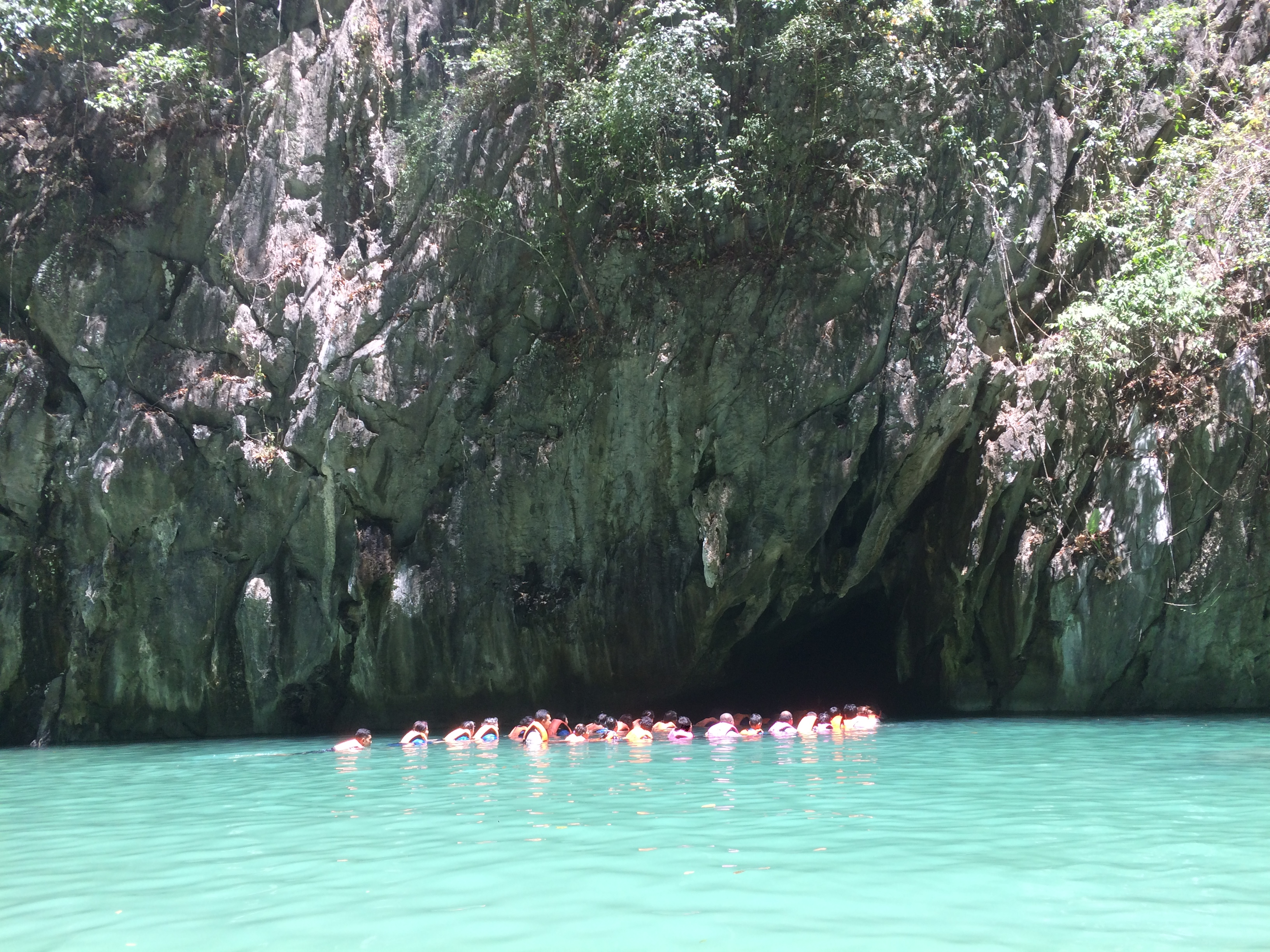
- Entrance to Emerald Cave
- Interactive map of Emerald Cave
- Location: The west coast of Muk Island (Kantang District, Trang, Thailand)
- Length: 80 m (260 ft)
- Geology: Sea cave

Emerald Cave (Thai: ถ้ำมรกต, RTGS: Tham Morakot, pronounced [tʰâm mɔ̄ː.rā.kòt]) is a cave located on the west coast of Ko Muk (also known as Koh Mook) Island in southern Thailand. The island of Ko Muk and Emerald Cave are part of the Trang Province.

Visitors to Emerald Cave enter a narrow 80 metre-long tunnel to reach a lagoon and beach surrounded by cliffs. The cave can also be entered by kayak. It is best to see the cave at mid tide, because at low tide there will be no water, hence no 'emerald' on the beach inside.

Outside the cave, there is a lagoon which is surrounded by tropical plants and a beach. The name of the cave is derived from the phenomenon that occurs, when the sun shines on the water, which reflects colored light all over the cave's wall. This can only be seen between 10.00 am and 2.00 pm.

== See also ==
- List of caves
- Speleology
