= Jesse Palmer =

Canadian gridiron football player, television host and sports analyst (born 1978)

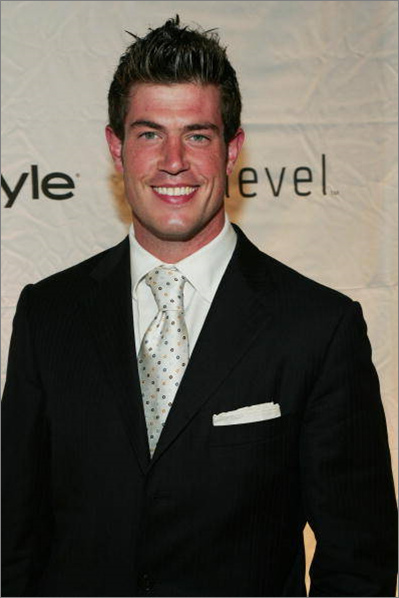
- Palmer in 2010
- Born: Jesse James Palmer; October 5, 1978 (age 48); Toronto, Ontario, Canada
- Education: University of Florida (BA, BS)
- Occupations: Television personality; sports commentator; American football player
- Years active: 1997–present
- Spouse: Emely Fardo (m. 2020)
- Children: 1
- Football career

No. 3
- Position: Quarterback

Personal information
- Listed height: 6 ft 2 in (1.88 m)
- Listed weight: 225 lb (102 kg)

Career information
- High school: St. Pius X (Ottawa, Ontario)
- College: Florida (1997–2000)
- NFL draft: 2001: 4th round, 125th overall pick
- CFL draft: 2001: 2nd round, 15th overall pick

Career history
- New York Giants (2001–2004); San Francisco 49ers (2005); Montreal Alouettes (2006)*
- * Offseason or practice squad member only

Career NFL statistics
- Passing attempts: 120
- Passing completions: 63
- Completion percentage: 52.5%
- TD–INT: 3–4
- Passing yards: 562
- Passer rating: 59.8
- Stats at Pro Football Reference

Jesse James Palmer (born October 5, 1978) is a Canadian television personality, sports commentator, and former professional football quarterback who played in the National Football League (NFL) for five seasons. Palmer played college football for the Florida Gators under coach Steve Spurrier and then played professionally for the New York Giants.

Palmer was cast in 2004 as the Bachelor on the fifth season of the reality television series The Bachelor. He went on to become a college football analyst for ESPN/ABC in the United States, and has been a contributor to The Sports Network (TSN) in Canada. He was also a contributor to ABC's Good Morning America. In 2018, he hosted the kickoff season of The Proposal on ABC. Since 2017, he has hosted the Holiday Baking Championship on Food Network. He was host of DailyMailTV from 2017 to 2020. In 2021, Palmer was named as the permanent host of The Bachelor and The Bachelorette.

== Early life ==
Palmer was born in Toronto, Ontario, and raised in Nepean, Ontario, an Ottawa suburb. He attended Confederation and St. Pius X high schools, although he played all of his amateur football in the Ontario Minor Football Association, most importantly with the Ottawa Norsemen and Myers Riders Football Clubs.

His father, Bill Palmer, played seven years for the Ottawa Rough Riders. His mother, Susan Palmer, was a prominent fashion and print model, co-founder of Barrett Palmer Models, and former owner of International Top Models, a modeling agency and training centre located in Ottawa which became MIM Model International Management.

He has two younger brothers and attended a French-immersion school. His brother Billy played tight end for the University of Notre Dame. His cousin, Griffen Palmer, is a country music singer and songwriter.

== College career ==
Palmer accepted an athletic scholarship to attend the University of Florida in Gainesville, Florida, where he played quarterback for coach Steve Spurrier's Florida Gators football team from 1997 to 2000.

Palmer often alternated playing time with Doug Johnson, and, later, with Rex Grossman. As a senior, he was selected as one of the team captains and received the Gators' Fergie Ferguson Award, recognizing the "senior football player who displays outstanding leadership, character and courage." He finished his college career with 3,755 passing yards.

Palmer graduated in 2001 with a Bachelor of Arts degree in political science from the College of Liberal Arts and Sciences and a Bachelor of Science degree in marketing from the College of Business Administration. He was named to the Southeastern Conference’s academic honor roll in 1998, 1999, and 2000.

== Professional football career ==
=== National Football League ===
Pre-draft measurables
Height	Weight	Arm length	Hand span	40-yard dash	10-yard split	20-yard split	20-yard shuttle	Three-cone drill	Vertical jump	Broad jump	Wonderlic
6 ft 2 in (1.88 m)	231 lb (105 kg)	31 1/2 in (0.80 m)	9 3/4 in (0.25 m)	4.78 s	1.68 s	2.77 s	4.29 s	7.13 s	35.5 in (0.90 m)	9 ft 4 in (2.84 m)	32
All values from NFL Combine

Palmer was selected by the New York Giants of the NFL in the fourth round (125th overall pick) of the 2001 draft. He played for the Giants from 2001 until he was cut before the start of the 2005 season. He spent most of his time as a Giant behind starter Kerry Collins. In 2002, Palmer played in two games. The following season, Palmer played in six games, starting three. Palmer was the second Canadian (after Mark Rypien of the Washington Redskins) to start at quarterback in the NFL.

The Giants cut him on September 3, 2005. He had entered training camp as the backup to Eli Manning but found himself odd-man-out when the Giants went with Tim Hasselbeck at number two and Jared Lorenzen at number three QB.

Attempting to locate another opportunity to stay in the NFL, Palmer worked out with the Minnesota Vikings and Oakland Raiders and was signed by the San Francisco 49ers on November 1, 2005, as injuries plagued their quarterbacks Alex Smith and Ken Dorsey. Dorsey and Smith returned from injury three weeks later, and Palmer was released without having played a down. Palmer was re-signed by the 49ers in March 2006 during the off-season, but was released on August 29, 2006, toward the end of training camp.

=== Canadian Football League ===
After leaving the NFL, he turned to the Canadian Football League (CFL) for employment. Palmer had been drafted 15th overall by the Montreal Alouettes in the 2001 CFL draft. His rights were still held by Montreal; however, the Ottawa Renegades tried to acquire the Ottawa native as their top quarterback in September 2005, and Palmer expressed interest in playing for his home town.

On September 11, 2006, the Alouettes signed him to their practice roster. Palmer did not dress for a game with Montreal. He retired from the CFL before the start of the 2007 season to pursue a broadcasting career.

== Career statistics ==
=== NFL ===
Year	Team	Games			Passing									Rushing					Sacked	
Year	Team	GP	GS	Record	Cmp	Att	Pct	Yds	Y/A	Lng	TD	Int	Rtg	Att	Yds	Y/A	Lng	TD	Sck	Yds
2002	NYG	2	0	—	3	4	75.0	30	7.5	14	0	0	95.8	1	–3	–3.0	–3	0	0	0
2003	NYG	6	3	0–3	60	116	51.7	532	4.6	40	3	4	58.5	4	23	5.8	26	0	16	95
2004	NYG	0	0	—	DNP															
2005	SF	0	0	—	DNP															
Career		8	3	0–3	63	120	52.5	562	4.7	40	3	4	59.8	5	20	4.0	26	0	16	95

=== College ===
Year	Team	Games			Passing								Rushing			
Year	Team	GP	GS	Record	Cmp	Att	Pct	Yds	Y/A	TD	Int	Rtg	Att	Yds	Avg	TD
1997	Florida	7	1	1–0	21	38	55.3	291	7.7	4	3	138.5	2	4	2.0	0
1998	Florida	7	6	5–1	73	123	59.3	1,246	10.1	14	5	173.9	17	–57	–3.4	0
1999	Florida	5	2	1–1	44	95	46.3	565	5.9	2	5	92.7	12	–20	–1.7	0
2000	Florida	10	5	4–1	116	223	52.0	1,653	7.4	11	4	127.0	36	–51	–1.4	6
Career		27	14	11–3	254	479	53.0	3,755	7.8	31	17	133.1	167	−124	−1.9	6

== The Bachelor ==
In 2004, Palmer was the first professional athlete to appear on The Bachelor television program and the first non-American Bachelor. During the first rose ceremony, Palmer called the name Katie in error, meaning to say Karen. After consulting with host Chris Harrison, Palmer offered a rose to both contestants. He eventually selected Jessica Bowlin, but their courtship lasted for only a few months after the end of the show. He would return as host of the 26th season, a role which he also filled on the 19th season of The Bachelorette. Palmer also hosted Bachelor in Paradise, Season 8. He is currently host of The Bachelor franchises. This includes The Golden Bachelor, the first season of which aired in Fall of 2023.

== Broadcasting career ==
Palmer's broadcasting career began with Fox Sports Net analyzing Arena Football League games. He was later a game and studio analyst for CSTV in late 2005 and worked NFL games for Fox in 2006. He also appeared on the NFL Network and the MSG Network.

Palmer was a color commentator for Fox for two games late in the 2005 season, and returned to the booth on November 26, 2006. On April 25, 2007, Palmer appeared on the NFL Network as an analyst and commentator for the weekend's NFL draft.

On May 24, 2007, Palmer announced his retirement from the Canadian Football League to pursue a broadcasting career with Fox. He joined ESPN in 2007. Palmer worked for ESPN as a studio analyst on College Football Live and ABC telecasts, and frequently appeared with fellow Canadian John Saunders until 2016. He was a game analyst on ESPN Thursday Night College football games. He was also co-host on The Palmer and Pollack Show on ESPNU with former Georgia defensive end, David Pollack.

On March 12, 2014, ESPN named Palmer and Brent Musburger as the lead game announcers for the forthcoming SEC Network.

Palmer was also New York correspondent for CTV's entertainment news program eTalk, covering both sports and entertainment events, including the Super Bowl and the 79th and 80th Academy Awards.

Palmer was a studio analyst for ESPN's broadcast of the 2012 Cotton Bowl in Dallas, Texas, the 2010 Fiesta Bowl in Glendale, Arizona, and the 2009 Rose Bowl in Pasadena, California. He was the ESPN analyst for the 2023 Orange Bowl in Miami Gardens, Florida. He is also an NFL analyst for TSN's "Monday Morning Quarterback" segment.

Palmer guest starred in the Law & Order: Special Victims Unit season 7 episode "Design," portraying professional baseball player Don Lacey. He hosted the first two seasons of the food competition show Recipe to Riches on Food Network Canada. On May 19, 2015, Palmer joined Good Morning America as a "Special Contributor". He left the position in August 2017 to host the newly launched DailyMailTV. He began hosting Spring Baking Championship in 2023 and has been hosting the Holiday Baking Championship for several seasons on Food Network, as well as Food Truck Face Off, Bakeaway Camp, and Holiday Baking: Gingerbread Showdown. In 2019, he became one of the commentators on ESPN's College Football Final.

In September 2018, Palmer began doing commercials as a spokesman for retail furniture chain Rooms to Go. He also became host of The Proposal on ABC.

On August 14, 2020, the producers of DailyMailTV announced that for the show's fourth season, Thomas Roberts was replacing Palmer.

In 2021, Palmer hosted the inaugural season of ABC's show The Ultimate Surfer. Subsequently, it was announced that he would become the new host of The Bachelor, Season 26, replacing Chris Harrison. He then hosted The Bachelorette, Season 19, and Bachelor in Paradise, Season 8. He is currently host of The Bachelor franchises.

In October 2023, he became the spokesman for Avocados from Mexico.

== Personal life ==
Palmer is married to Brazilian photographer and model Emely Fardo. They met at a boxing class in 2017 and married in Connecticut in 2020. After pandemic restrictions eased, they had a second wedding at Château De La Gaude, a luxury hotel in Aix-en-Provence, France in 2022. Their daughter was born in January 2024.

== See also ==
- Florida Gators football, 1990–99
- List of Florida Gators in the NFL draft
- List of New York Giants players
- List of University of Florida alumni
