= Bachelor Pad =

American reality television game show

- Presented by: Chris Harrison; Melissa Rycroft
- Country of origin: United States
- Original language: English
- No. of seasons: 3
- No. of episodes: 20

Production
- Executive producers: Mike Fleiss; Martin Hilton; Jay Bienstock; Elan Gale
- Running time: 80–86 minutes 126 minutes (season 2 premiere and finale)
- Production companies: NZK Productions; Next Entertainment; Warner Horizon Television

Original release
- Network: ABC
- Release: August 9, 2010 – September 10, 2012

Related
- The Bachelor; The Bachelorette; Bachelor in Paradise; Bachelor in Paradise: After Paradise

Bachelor Pad is an elimination-style two-hour American reality television game show that debuted on August 9, 2010 on ABC. The show features contestants from The Bachelor and The Bachelorette, who compete for a final cash prize of $250,000. Former game show host and news anchor Chris Harrison reprises his role from The Bachelor, while Melissa Rycroft served as special guest co-host for the first season.

In March 2013, it was announced that the program would not return for a fourth season. However, one year later after the show cancelled, it was replaced by Bachelor in Paradise.

Blake Julian and Holly Durst of season 2 were married on June 2, 2012. They are the only Bachelor Pad couple to get married.

== About the show ==
The show stars eleven women and eight men eliminated from various seasons of The Bachelor and The Bachelorette who compete for a $250,000 prize. The women on the first season were mostly from The Bachelor season 14. The men on the first season were mostly from The Bachelorette season 5. The show may also represent "a second chance at finding love" for those rejected by previous Bachelors and Bachelorettes. The contestants live together in a mansion and take part in challenges to prevent elimination, go on dates with contestants of their choice, and choose other contestants to eliminate.

== Show format ==
At the beginning of the season, each contestant privately votes for a person of the opposite sex to be eliminated. Each week, the person with the highest vote count from each sex is eliminated, while a competition winner casts the deciding vote publicly in the event of a tie. In order to advance to the final eight, the sex with the fewest remaining contestants selects partners for competing as couples. A ballroom dancing competition, similar to Dancing with the Stars, is the final competition. Previous Bachelors and Bachelorettes serve as the judges, with the winning couple deciding the couple it will advance to the final vote. The final vote is left to the eliminated contestants who weigh the most deserving couple to be awarded the $250,000 prize. After the final vote, the couple participates in a Prisoner's Dilemma whereby the male contestant and female contestant must decide whether to keep or share the $250,000 prize. The final twist in the show's format is that if both contestants choose to "keep" the grand prize, the monetary prize is evenly distributed amongst the other eliminated contestants.

Season one ended with Natalie and David winning the final vote over Kiptyn and Tenley. The deciding vote was cast by Wes, who opposed David throughout the show. Natalie and David each chose to share the $250,000, thus leaving each with $125,000. Natalie promised to spend the money on repaying student loans and giving vacations to her parents. Natalie and David ended the show as friends, citing geographic constraints, while Kiptyn and Tenley ended the show by referring to each other as boyfriend and girlfriend.

The format made some changes in season three, adding fans into the regular contestant fold of previous Bachelor/Bachelorette contestants.

== Season 1 (2010) ==
=== Contestants ===
Name	Age	Occupation	Residence	From	Eliminated
Natalie Getz	28	Bartender	Los Angeles, California	The Bachelor – Jason	Co-Winner
David Good	28	Entrepreneur	Dayton, Ohio	The Bachelorette – Jillian	Co-Winner
Kiptyn Locke	32	Sales & Operations Manager	Encinitas, California	The Bachelorette – Jillian	Episode 6
Tenley Molzahn	26	College Admissions	Huntington Beach, California	The Bachelor – Jake	Episode 6
Elizabeth Kitt	30	Sales	Los Angeles, California	The Bachelor – Jake	Episode 6
Jesse Kovacs	28	Winemaker	Los Angeles, California	The Bachelorette – Jillian	Episode 6
Jesse Beck	25	General Contractor	Peculiar, Missouri	The Bachelorette – Ali	Episode 5
Peyton Wright	27	Cheerleader Apparel Sales	Dallas, Texas	The Bachelor – Andy	Episode 5
Ashley Elmore	30	Teacher	Fairfax, Virginia	The Bachelor – Jake	Episode 5
Gwen Gioia	39	Project Manager	Philadelphia, Pennsylvania	The Bachelor – Aaron	Episode 5
Nikki Kaapke	30	Administrative Assistant	Chicago, Illinois	The Bachelor – Jason	Episode 5
Wes Hayden	33	Country Music Artist	Austin, Texas	The Bachelorette – Jillian	Episode 4
Krisily Kennedy	30	Personal Assistant	Los Angeles, California	The Bachelor – Charlie	Episode 4
Gia Allemand	26	Swimsuit Model	New York City, New York	The Bachelor – Jake	Episode 3
Jonathan "Weatherman" Novack	31	Weatherman	Houston, Texas	The Bachelorette – Ali	Episode 3
Craig McKinnon	34	Dental Sales	Sarnia, Ontario, Canada	The Bachelorette – Ali	Episode 2
Jessie Sulidis	25	Cosmetics Sales	Oakville, Ontario, Canada	The Bachelor – Jake	Episode 2
Juan Barbieri	37	General Contractor	Los Angeles, California	The Bachelorette – Jillian	Episode 1
Michelle Kujawa	26	Sales	Anaheim, California	The Bachelor – Jake	Episode 1

=== The game ===
Episode	Air Date	Challenge	Challenge Winner(s)	Date(s)	Safe Rose(s)	Eliminated
1	August 9, 2010	Twister	Craig	Craig took Elizabeth, Gwen, Jessie	Jessie	Juan, Michelle
2	August 16, 2010	Pie Eating	Jonathan, Gia	Jonathan took Ashley, Gwen, Peyton; Gia took Craig, Jesse B., Wes	Gwen, Wes	Craig, Jessie
3	August 23, 2010	Kissing Competition	David, Peyton	David took Krisily, Natalie, Nikki; Peyton took Jesse B., Jesse K., Kiptyn	Natalie, Jesse B.	Jonathan, Gia
4	August 30, 2010	Survey	Jesse B., Tenley	Tenley took Kiptyn; Jesse B. took Peyton	Kiptyn, Peyton	Krisily, Wes
5	September 6, 2010	Water balloon Toss	David, Natalie	David and Natalie went on a date	David, Natalie	Ashley, Gwen, Nikki, Jesse B., Peyton
6	September 13, 2010	Ballroom Dancing Competition	Kiptyn, Tenley	None	Kiptyn, Tenley	Elizabeth, Jesse K.
6	September 13, 2010	No Challenge	David, Natalie	None	N/A	Kiptyn, Tenley

=== Elimination chart ===
Place	Contestant	Episodes							Finale
Place	Contestant	1	2	3	4	5	6		Votes
1	Natalie	In	In	Safe	In	Win	Last	Winner	Share
1	David	In	In	Win	In	Win	Last	Winner	Share
3	Kiptyn	In	Last	Date	Safe	In	Win	Out	
3	Tenley	In	In	In	Win	In	Win	Out	
5	Elizabeth	Date	In	Last	In	Last	Out		Not Revealed
5	Jesse K.	Last	In	Last	Last	Last	Out		Not Revealed
7	Jesse B.	In	Date	Safe	Win	Out			David & Natalie
7	Peyton	In	Date	Win	Safe	Out			David & Natalie
9	Ashley	In	Date	In	In	Out			David & Natalie
9	Gwen	Date	Safe	In	Last	Out			Kiptyn & Tenley
9	Nikki	In	In	Date	In	Out			David & Natalie
12	Wes	In	Safe	In	Out				David & Natalie
12	Krisily	Last	Last	Date	Out				David & Natalie
14	Gia	In	Win	Out					Not Revealed
14	Jonathan	In	Win	Out					Kiptyn & Tenley
16	Craig	Win	Out						Kiptyn & Tenley
16	Jessie	Safe	Out						David & Natalie
18	Juan	Out							Kiptyn & Tenley
18	Michelle	Out							David & Natalie

==== Key ====
The contestant is male.
The contestant is female.

Winner The contestant won the competition and split the prize.
Win The contestant won a challenge and was granted immunity.
Safe The contestant went on a date and was given a rose by a challenge winner, thus getting immunity.
Date The contestant went on a date but was not given a rose on the date.
In The contestant received a rose at the end of the episode, thus remaining in the competition.
Last The contestant received the last rose.
Last The contestant went on a date and received the last rose.
Last The contestant won a tie-breaker and received the last rose.
Out The contestant lost a tie-breaker and was eliminated.
Out The contestant went on a date and was eliminated.
Out The contestant was eliminated by another contestant/team.
Out The contestant was eliminated.

=== Reception ===
Bachelor Pad received mixed reviews from television critics, and currently holds a "mixed or average" 48 out of 100 rating on review aggregate Metacritic.

== Season 2 (2011) ==
=== Contestants ===
Name	Age	Occupation	Residence	From	Eliminated
Holly Durst	28	Author	Los Angeles, California	The Bachelor – Matt	Co-Winner
Michael Stagliano	27	Entrepreneur	Los Angeles, California	The Bachelorette – Jillian	Co-Winner
Michelle Money	30	Hairstylist	Salt Lake City, Utah	The Bachelor – Brad (2011)	Episode 7
Graham Bunn	32	Entrepreneur	New York City, New York	The Bachelorette – DeAnna	Episode 7
Vienna Girardi	25	Marketing Representative	Los Angeles, California	The Bachelor – Jake	Episode 6
Kasey Kahl	27	Advertising Account Executive	Clovis, California	The Bachelorette – Ali	Episode 6
Kirk DeWindt	27	Personal Trainer	Minneapolis, Minnesota	The Bachelorette – Ali	Episode 6
Ella Nolan	31	Hairstylist	LaFollette, Tennessee	The Bachelor – Jake	Episode 6
Blake Julian	28	Dentist	Greenville, South Carolina	The Bachelorette – Ashley	Episode 5
Erica Rose	28	Law Student	Houston, Texas	The Bachelor – Lorenzo	Episode 5
William Holman	30	Cellular Phone Salesman	Fostoria, Ohio	The Bachelorette – Ashley	Episode 4
Melissa Schreiber	32	Waitress	Boca Raton, Florida	The Bachelor – Brad (2011)	Episode 4
Jake Pavelka	33	Pilot	Los Angeles, California	The Bachelorette – Jillian; The Bachelor – Season 14	Episode 3
Ames Brown	31	Portfolio Manager	New York City, New York	The Bachelorette – Ashley	Episode 2 (withdrew)
Jackie Gordon	27	Assistant Teacher	New York City, New York	The Bachelor – Brad (2011)	Episode 2
Gia Allemand	27	Model	New York City, New York	The Bachelor – Jake	Episode 2 (withdrew)
Alli Travis	25	Buyer	Columbus, Ohio	The Bachelor – Brad (2011)	Episode 1
Justin "The Wrestler" Rego	27	Sales	Toronto, Ontario, Canada	The Bachelorette – Ali	Episode 1

=== The game ===
Episode	Air Date	Challenge	Challenge Winner(s)	Date(s)	Safe Rose(s)	Eliminated
1	August 8, 2011	Hook Up	Jake, Jackie	Jake and Jackie went on a date	Vienna	Justin, Alli
2	August 15, 2011	Target on your Back	Michael, Melissa	Michael took Erica, Michelle, Holly; Melissa took Kirk, Kasey, Blake	Holly, Blake	Jackie; Ames and Gia quit
3	August 22, 2011	Synchronized Swimming	Michael, Michelle	Michael took Vienna, Ella, Holly; Michelle took Blake, Graham, Kasey	Graham, Holly	Jake
4	August 29, 2011	Second Kissing Competition	Blake, Ella	Ella took Kirk on a date Blake took Holly on a date	Kirk, Holly	William, Melissa
5	September 5, 2011	The Nearlywed Game	Graham, Michelle	Graham and Michelle went on a date Erica and Blake, the second-place finisher, also went on a date	Kasey, Vienna	Blake, Erica
6	September 12, 2011	Cirque du Soleil 'KÀ' In Las Vegas	Holly, Michael	None	Graham and Michelle	Ella, Kirk, Vienna, Kasey
6	September 12, 2011	No challenge	Holly, Michael	None	N/A	Graham and Michelle

=== Elimination table ===
Place	Contestant	Episodes								Finale
Place	Contestant	1	2	3	4	5	6		7	Votes
1	Holly^{1}	In	Safe	Safe	Safe	In	Win	Safe	Winner	Share
1	Michael^{1}	In	Win	Win	In	In	Win	Safe	Winner	Share
3	Graham^{2}	In	In	Safe	In	Win	Last	Last	Out	
3	Michelle^{2}	In	Date	Win	In	Win	Last	Last	Out	
5	Kasey^{3}	Last	Date	Last	Last	Safe	In	Out		Graham & Michelle
5	Vienna^{3}	Safe	In	Date	In	Safe	In	Out		Graham & Michelle
7	Ella^{4}	In	Last	Date	Win	Last	Out			Holly & Michael
7	Kirk^{4}	In	Date	In	Safe	Last	Out			Holly & Michael
9	Blake^{5}	In	Safe	Date	Win	Out				Holly & Michael
9	Erica^{5}	In	Date	In	Last	Out				Holly & Michael
11	Melissa	In	Win	In	Out					Graham & Michelle
11	William	In	In	In	Out					Graham & Michelle
13	Jake	Win	In	Out						Holly & Michael
14	Ames	In	Quit							Holly & Michael
15	Jackie	Win	Out							Holly & Michael
16	Gia	Last	Quit							Holly & Michael
17	Alli	Out								Holly & Michael
17	Justin	Out								Holly & Michael

==== Key ====
The contestant is male.
The contestant is female.

- ^{12345} Contestants with the same number indicate duos paired up in week 5

Winner The contestant won the competition and split the prize.
Win The contestant won a challenge and was granted immunity.
Safe The contestant went on a date and was given a rose by a challenge winner, thus getting immunity.
Date The contestant went on a date but was not given a rose on the date.
In The contestant received a rose at the end of the episode, thus remaining in the competition.
Last The contestant received the last rose.
Last The contestant went on a date and received the last rose.
Out The contestant was eliminated by another contestant/team.
Out The contestant was eliminated at a challenge
Out The contestant went on a date and was eliminated.
Out The contestant was eliminated.
Quit The contestant voluntarily left the show.

== Season 3 (2012) ==
=== Contestants ===
Name	Age	Occupation	Residence	From	Eliminated
Nick Peterson	27	Personal Trainer	Tampa, Florida	The Bachelorette – Ashley	Winner
Rachel Truehart	27	Executive Assistant	New York City, New York	The Bachelor – Ben F.	Episode 8
Sarah Newlon	28	Bar Manager	St. Louis, Missouri	The Bachelor – Brad (2007)	Episode 8
Chris Bukowski	25	Corporate Sales Director	Chicago, Illinois	The Bachelorette – Emily	Episode 8
Jaclyn Swartz	27	Account Manager	New York City, New York	The Bachelor – Ben F.	Episode 7
Ed Swiderski	33	Technology Consultant	Chicago, Illinois	The Bachelorette – Jillian	Episode 7
Blakeley Jones	34	Esthetician	Charlotte, North Carolina	The Bachelor – Ben F.	Episode 7
Tony Pieper	31	Lumber Trader	Beaverton, Oregon	The Bachelorette – Emily	Episode 7
Kalon McMahon	27	Luxury Brand Consultant	Houston, Texas	The Bachelorette – Emily	Episode 6
Lindzi Cox	27	Development Manager	Bellevue, Washington	The Bachelor – Ben F.	Episode 6
Michael Stagliano	28	Entrepreneur	Los Angeles, California	The Bachelorette – Jillian	Episode 5
Erica Rose	29	Attorney	Los Angeles, California	The Bachelor – Lorenzo	Episode 5
David Mallet	28	Real Estate Agent	Hoboken, New Jersey	—N/a (Note: Appeared only as Super Fan)	Episode 4
Jamie Otis	26	Registered Nurse	New York City, New York	The Bachelor – Ben F.	Episode 4
Reid Rosenthal	33	Realtor	Philadelphia, Pennsylvania	The Bachelorette – Jillian	Episode 3
Donna Zitelli	22	Student	Hackensack, New Jersey	—N/a	Episode 3
Ryan Hoag	32	Former NFL Player	Minneapolis, Minnesota	The Bachelorette – DeAnna	Episode 2
Brittany Taltos (Note: Brittany and Erica were on a Season 4 episode of Jersey Shore.)	22	Students	Gainesville, Florida	—N/a	Episode 2 (Quit)
Erica Taltos	22	Students	Gainesville, Florida	—N/a	Episode 2 (Quit)
Paige Vigil	24	Jumbo Tron Operator	New York City, New York	—N/a	Episode 1
Chris "SWAT" Bain	28	SWAT Team Officer	Canton, Georgia	—N/a	Episode 1

=== The game ===
Episode	Air Date	Challenge	Challenge Winner(s)	Challenge Loser(s)	Date(s)	Safe Rose(s)	Eliminated
1	July 23, 2012	Falling For Love	Brittany, David	Erica R., Nick	Brittany, Erica T. and David went on a date	None	Chris Bain, Paige
2	July 30, 2012	Rhythmic Gymnastics	Blakeley, Michael	Erica R., Ed	Michael took Rachel, Lindzi, Donna; Blakeley took Chris Bukowski, Ed, David	Chris Bukowski, Rachel	Ryan; Brittany and Erica T. quit
3	August 6, 2012	Hot Sludge Funday	Rachel, David	Jamie, Ed	David took Blakeley, Erica R., Jamie; Rachel took Nick, Tony, Michael	Jamie, Michael	Donna, Reid
4	August 13, 2012	Gameshow Mashup	Jaclyn, Ed	Rachel, David	Jaclyn took Ed; *Chris Bukowski took Sarah	Chris Bukowski, Rachel	David, Jamie
5	August 20, 2012	Great Fall of China	Blakeley, Tony	N/A	Blakeley took Tony; **Kalon took Lindzi	Jaclyn, Kalon	Erica R., Michael
6	August 27, 2012	Bachelor Pad Spelling Bee	Chris Bukowski, Sarah	N/A	Chris Bukowski took Sarah; Ed & Jaclyn went on a date	Tony, Blakeley	Kalon, Lindzi
7	September 3, 2012	Hanging By A Thread; Karaoke to Nightranger's "Sister Christian"	Chris Bukowski, Sarah; Nick, Rachel	Tony, Blakeley	None	None	***Tony, Blakeley; Ed, Jaclyn
8	September 10, 2012	None	Nick, Rachel	None	None	None	Chris Bukowski, Sarah, ****Rachel

Notes

- Because Jaclyn and Ed both won and Jaclyn took Ed on the first date, they were told to choose a man to get the date rose. That man would be able to ask the woman of his choosing on a date. Jaclyn gave the rose to Chris Bukowski, who chose to take Sarah on the date.
- Because Blakeley and Tony both won and Blakeley took Tony on a date, they were told to choose a man to get the date rose. That man would be able to ask the woman of his choosing on a date. They gave the rose to Kalon, who chose to take Lindzi on the date.
- Because Chris Bukowski and Sarah won, they were told to eliminate a couple and chose Tony and Blakeley.
- Because Nick chose to keep the money, he won the whole $250,000 and Rachel was eliminated.

=== Elimination table ===
Place	Contestant	Episodes									Finale
Place	Contestant	1	2	3	4	5	6	7		8	Votes
1	Nick	Last	In	Date	Last	In	Last	In	Win	Winner	Keep
2	Rachel	In	Safe	Win	Safe	In	Last	In	Win	Out	Share
3	Chris Bukowski	In	Safe	In	Safe	In	Win	Win	Last	Out	
3	Sarah	In	In	In	Date	In	Win	Win	Last	Out	
5	Ed	In	Last	Last	Win	In	Date	In	Out		Rachel & Nick
5	Jaclyn	In	In	In	Win	Safe	Date	In	Out		Rachel & Nick
7	Tony	In	In	Date	In	Win	Safe	Out			Rachel & Nick
7	Blakeley	In	Win	Last	Last	Win	Safe	Out			Rachel & Nick
9	Kalon	In	In	In	In	Safe	Out				Chris Bukowski & Sarah
9	Lindzi	In	Date	In	In	Last	Out				Rachel & Nick
11	Michael	In	Win	Safe	In	Out					Rachel & Nick
12	Erica R.	Last	In	Date	In	Out					Chris Bukowski & Sarah
13	David	Win	Date	Win	Out						Chris Bukowski & Sarah
13	Jamie	In	In	Safe	Out						Rachel & Nick
15	Reid	In	In	Out							Rachel & Nick
15	Donna	In	Date	Out							Rachel & Nick
17	Ryan	In	Out								Rachel & Nick
18	Brittany & Erica T.	Win	Quit								Rachel & Nick
19	Paige	Out									Rachel & Nick
19	Chris Bain	Out									Rachel & Nick

==== Key ====
The contestant is male.
The contestant is female.

Winner The contestant won the competition and kept the entire prize for him/herself.
Win The contestant won a challenge and was granted immunity.
Win The contestant won a challenge and was not granted immunity. They chose whom to eliminate.
Safe The contestant went on a date and was given a rose by a challenge winner, thus getting immunity.
Safe The contestant did not go on a date but was given a rose by a challenge winner, thus getting immunity.
Date The contestant went on a date but was not given a rose on the date.
In The contestant received a rose at the end of the episode, thus remaining in the competition.
Last The contestant received the last rose.
Last The contestant went on a date and received the last rose.
Out The contestant was eliminated by another contestant/team.
Out The contestant was chosen to be eliminated by the eliminated contestant.
Out The contestant was eliminated.
Quit The contestant voluntarily left the show.
