= Ali Fedotowsky =

American television personality

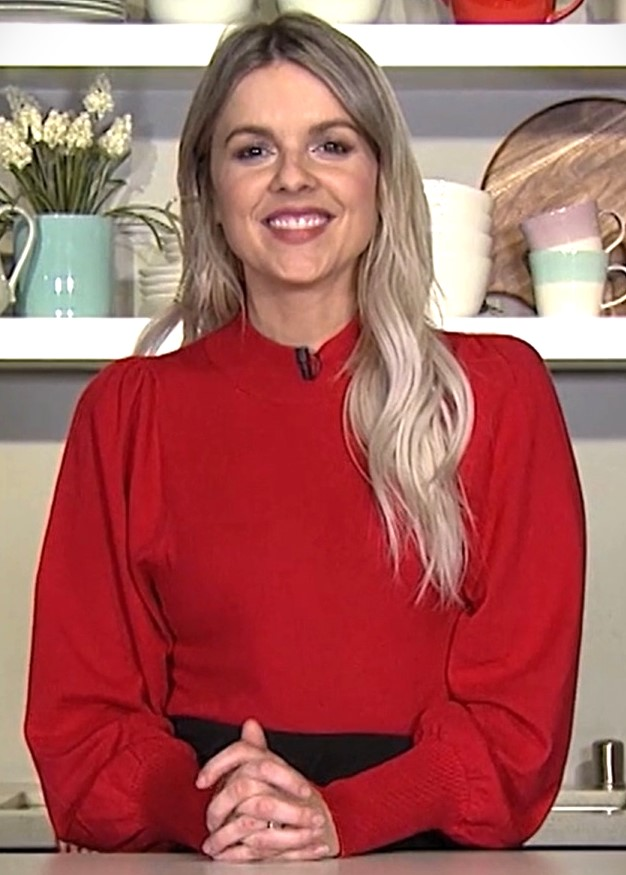
- Fedotowsky-Manno interviewed in 2019
- Born: Alexandra Elaine Fedotowsky; September 16, 1984 (age 42); Massachusetts, U.S.
- Education: Clark University
- Occupation: Television personality
- Years active: 2010–present
- Television: The Bachelor; The Bachelorette; 1st Look; E! News
- Spouse: Kevin Manno (m. 2017)
- Children: 2
- Website: www.aliluvs.com

Alexandra Elaine Fedotowsky-Manno (née Fedotowsky; born September 16, 1984) is an American television personality best known as a cast member on the ABC reality shows The Bachelor and Bachelorette (2010).

== Early life and education ==
Fedotowsky was born in Massachusetts. She grew up in North Adams and Williamstown and is a graduate of Mount Greylock Regional High School. She attended the University of Massachusetts Amherst for two years prior to transferring to Clark University in Worcester, Massachusetts, where she graduated with a Bachelor of Arts in 2006.

== Career ==
Fedotowsky's work in television began when she was selected as a cast member on ABC's reality show The Bachelor series which first aired on January 4, 2010. The show placed her with twenty four other women all contending for the affection of pilot Jake Pavelka. She left the show when she was confronted with an ultimatum from her employer, Facebook, regarding the choice to return to work or to quit. Fedotowsky then returned as the star of The Bachelorette where she became engaged with Roberto Martinez in the finale.

After The Bachelorette, Fedotowsky moved to San Diego, California and joined the local Fox news station as a weekly morning show correspondent. From March 2012 through the fall of 2013, she hosted the weekly lifestyle television show 1st Look, which airs on NBC. Fedotowsky was on the live judging panel for Miss USA 2012. In 2013, she appeared in an infomercial for Sheer Cover Studio mineral makeup, hosted by Brooke Burke.

On August 7, 2013, E! News announced Fedotowsky had been hired as a correspondent. In June 2015, she announced she was leaving that position. In September 2017, Fedotowsky joined Home and Family as an official "family member."

== Public image ==
She is a social media influencer and has gained more than one million followers on Instagram, as of June 2021. Fedotowsky aims to be honest and transparent on social media, telling People magazine: "I'm on my own journey of self-love with my body and I've played that out online," she says. "It shouldn't be a big deal. And I don't ever edit my body to make it skinnier." She has previously turned down an offer to promote a weight loss pill "because that's not who I am or what I want to represent. I only work with brands I truly love."

Since her appearance on The Bachelor, Fedotowsky has appeared in numerous magazine covers, including LA Baby, Fit Pregnancy and Baby, The Improper Bostonian, Us Weekly and People.

== Personal life ==
In 2010, Fedotowsky became engaged to Roberto Martinez on the finale of The Bachelorette. In November 2011, Fedotowsky and Martinez ended their engagement.

In 2013, Fedotowsky began dating Kevin Manno, a radio and television host. The two announced their engagement in September 2015. Their first child, daughter Molly, was born July 6, 2016. Fedotowsky and Manno married on March 3, 2017. Their son Riley, was born May 24, 2018.

== Filmography ==
Film and television roles
Year	Title	Role	Notes
2010–2012	The Bachelor	Herself	Contestant on season 14
2010–2019	The Bachelorette	Herself	Bachelorette on season 6
2012	The 2012 Miss USA Pageant	Herself	Judge
2012–2013	1st Look	Herself	Host
2013	Blue Jasmine	Melanie	Film
2013–2015	E! News	Herself	Correspondent, host; 98 episodes
2014–2015	E! Live from the Red Carpet	Herself	Correspondent; 3 episodes
2015	Who Wants to Be a Millionaire	Herself	Celebrity Contestant
2016–2020	Home & Family	Herself	Guest Co-Host; 179 episodes

Preceded by Jillian Harris	The Bachelorette; Season 6	Succeeded by Ashley Hebert
Preceded by Maria Sansone	1st Look host 2012-2013	Succeeded by Audrina Patridge
