= Gia Allemand =

American actress and model (1983–2013)

- Born: Gia Marie Allemand; December 20, 1983; Queens, New York, U.S.
- Died: August 14, 2013 (aged 29); New Orleans, Louisiana, U.S.
- Occupations: Actress, model
- Years active: 2002–2013
- Modeling information
- Height: 5 ft 5 in (1.65 m)
- Hair color: Brown
- Eye color: Brown

Gia Marie Allemand (December 20, 1983 – August 14, 2013) was an American actress, model, and reality television contestant. She was known for appearing in Maxim and competing on two ABC reality shows, The Bachelor: On the Wings of Love and Bachelor Pad.

== Career ==
=== Modeling and acting ===
Allemand began modeling early, and as a baby she appeared in Johnson & Johnson ads and as a Gerber Baby. As a teenager, Allemand initially never thought about a career in modeling. However, at 19 she began modeling after she was asked to enter a swimsuit competition that she won. Allemand finished second in the Miss Hawaiian Tropic competition and the Miss Red Hot Taj Mahal Super Bowl contest in 2005. She is best known for appearing as a swimsuit model in Maxim in 2007. In 2008, she was named Miss Bikini-USA's Model of the Year. The following year Allemand placed first in the bikini short class of the NPC Arnold Amateur Championships. In addition to modeling, Allemand worked for the modeling and creative-fields consultancy Dream It Make It.

Allemand said in an interview that she has always had a passion for acting and performing. She was a former professional ballet dancer, but her dancing career was shortened after she injured her hamstring and Achilles tendon. Nevertheless, Allemand took acting classes in high school and at Hartford College. In 2010, she was selected to play a role in an upcoming film produced by Brett Ratner on the life of actor Gianni Russo. She was cast to play the supporting role of actress Ava Gardner. Russo cast her for the role saying, "Gia looks a lot like Ava, but it's really the passion that she had that convinced me to cast her."

=== Television ===
Allemand's work in television began when she was selected as a cast member on ABC's reality show The Bachelor: On the Wings of Love, season 14 of The Bachelor series, which first aired on January 4, 2010. The show placed her with 24 other women all contending for the affection of pilot Jake Pavelka. She was the second to the last contestant eliminated by Pavelka. On February 18, 2010, Allemand appeared on The Ellen DeGeneres Show, where she discussed her life after being on The Bachelor.

Afterwards, Allemand joined the cast of ABC's Bachelor spinoff, Bachelor Pad. The show premiered August 9, 2010, on ABC. Allemand cited an existing relationship as the reason she refused to participate in the show's "kissing contest" game which led to her elimination in the third episode. Before appearing on Bachelor Pad Allemand was featured in a special edition of ABC's 20/20: Inside the Bachelor: Stories Behind the Rose.

Allemand appeared in the episodic short film Ghost Trek: The Kinsey Report, a horror-comedy about a paranormal reality show, in which Allemand plays the role of producer Shawna Leibowitz.

== Personal life ==
Gia Marie Allemand was born to Eugene and Donna Allemand in the Howard Beach neighborhood of Queens, New York City, and grew up in the borough of Staten Island and nearby in suburban Manorville, New York, on Long Island, where she graduated from Lindenhurst High School in 2001. Allemand's parents separated in 1992, later divorcing; Donna Allemand married Tony Micheletti, whom she described as closer to Gia than was Gia's biological father.

Allemand had premenstrual dysphoric disorder (PMDD).

In 2013, she was living in New Orleans and dating NBA player Ryan Anderson, who was playing for the New Orleans Pelicans.

== Death ==
Allemand died on August 14, 2013, at the age of 29, and her death was confirmed to be a suicide. She had attempted suicide two days before by hanging herself with a vacuum cleaner cord in her New Orleans home.

Her longtime publicist, Penelope Jean Hayes, was interviewed by Phil McGraw on Dr. Phil on the topic of Allemand's suicide and the pressures of celebrity, image, and finding love and happiness. Allemand's death was noted during a 2014 episode of The Bachelor.

== See also ==
- List of people who died by hanging
