= The Bachelorette (American TV series) season 6 =

Season of US television series

The Bachelorette
- Season 6
- Starring: Ali Fedotowsky
- Presented by: Chris Harrison
- No. of contestants: 25
- Winner: Roberto Martinez
- Runner-up: Chris Lambton
- No. of episodes: 12 (including 2 specials)

Release
- Original network: ABC
- Original release: May 24 – August 2, 2010

Additional information
- Filming dates: March 15 – May 10, 2010

Season chronology
- ← Previous; Season 5 Next → Season 7

The sixth season of The Bachelorette, an ABC reality television series, premiered on May 24, 2010. This season featured 25-year-old Ali Fedotowsky, an advertising account manager from Williamstown, Massachusetts. Fedotowsky finished in fourth place on season 14 of The Bachelor featuring Jake Pavelka, after she eliminated herself due to a work-related ultimatum.

The season concluded on August 2, 2010, with Fedotowsky accepting a proposal from 26-year-old insurance agent Roberto Martinez. Martinez is the first male Latino winner in The Bachelorette. The couple ended their relationship on November 21, 2011.

== Contestants ==
Name	Age	Hometown	Occupation	Outcome	Place
Roberto Martinez	26	Tampa, Florida	Insurance Agent	Winner	1
Chris Lambton	33	Dennis, Massachusetts	Landscaper	Runner-up	2
Frank Neuschaefer	31	Bartlett, Illinois	Retail Manager	Week 9	3 (quit)
Kirk DeWindt	27	Green Bay, Wisconsin	Sales Consultant	Week 8	4
Tyrone "Ty" Brown	31	Booneville, Mississippi	Medical Sales	Week 7	5
Craig Robinson	27	Langhorne, Pennsylvania	Lawyer	Week 6	6
Justin Rego	26	Toronto, Ontario	Entertainment Wrestler	Week 6	7 (DQ)
Chris Nordhorn	29	Winter Park, Florida	Entrepreneur	Week 5	8
Kasey Kahl	27	Clovis, California	Advertising Account Executive	Week 5	9
Jesse Beck	24	Peculiar, Missouri	General Contractor	Week 4	10–11
Jonathan Novack	30	Boston, Massachusetts	Weatherman	Week 4	10–11
John Crivello	32	Mukilteo, Washington	Hotel Business Development	Week 3	12–13
Steve Kocsis	28	Chesterland, Ohio	Sales Representative	Week 3	12–13
Hunter Wagner	28	Fair Oaks Ranch, Texas	Internet Account Executive	Week 3	14
Chris Hasek-Watt	27	Campbell River, British Columbia	Real Estate Developer	Week 2	15–17
Craig McKinnon	34	Sarnia, Ontario	Dental Sales	Week 2	15–17
Tyler Vermette	25	Chelsea, Vermont	Online Advertising	Week 2	15–17
Derek Soldenski	28	Warren, Michigan	Sales Manager	Week 1	18–25
Derrick Schuster	27	Manhattan Beach, California	Construction Engineer	Week 1	18–25
Jason Whitehead	27	Johnson City, Tennessee	Construction Consultant	Week 1	18–25
Jason "Jay" Resmini	29	Barrington, Rhode Island	Lawyer	Week 1	18–25
John Nichols	27	Wichita, Kansas	Engineering Software Sales	Week 1	18–25
Kyle Higgins	26	Highlands Ranch, Colorado	Outdoorsman	Week 1	18–25
Phil Kayden	30	Elmore, Ohio	Investment Manager	Week 1	18–25
Tyler Morrow	25	Helena, Montana	Catering Manager	Week 1	18–25

=== Future appearances ===
==== The Bachelor ====
Ali Fedotowsky and Roberto Martinez appeared in episode 2 of the fifteenth season of The Bachelor, where they gave an advice for the contestants of that season.

==== Bachelor Pad ====
Craig McKinnon, Jesse Beck, and Jonathan Novack returned for the first season of Bachelor Pad. Craig M. was eliminated in week 2 and Jonathan in week 3. Jesse and his partner, Peyton Wright, were eliminated at the end of week 5, finishing in 4th place.

Justin Rego, Kasey Kahl, and Kirk DeWindt returned for the second season of Bachelor Pad. Justin was eliminated in week 1. Kirk and his partner, Ella Nolan, were eliminated at the beginning of week 6, finishing in 4th place. Kasey and his partner, Vienna Girardi, were eliminated at the end of week 6, finishing in 3rd place.

==== Bachelor in Paradise ====
Season 2

Kirk returned for the second season of Bachelor in Paradise. He split from Carly Waddell in week 6.

== Call-out order ==
Order	Bachelors	Week									
Order	Bachelors	1	2	3	4	5	6	7	8	9 (Note: In episode 9, Frank decided to quit from the competition after admitted that he was in love with his girlfriend back at home. As a result, neither a contestant was sent home during the rose ceremony.)	10
1	Chris H.	Roberto	Frank	Roberto	Chris L.	Kirk	Ty	Chris L.	Roberto	Chris L. Roberto	Roberto
2	Jesse	Justin	Ty	Kirk	Kirk	Ty	Frank	Frank	Chris L.	Chris L. Roberto	Chris L.
3	Chris L.	Jesse	Jesse	Chris L.	Frank	Justin	Roberto	Roberto	Frank	Frank	
4	Ty	Ty	Kasey	Jesse	Craig R.	Frank	Chris L.	Kirk	Kirk		
5	Frank	Craig R.	Hunter	Chris N.	Chris N.	Chris L.	Kirk	Ty			
6	Justin	Tyler V.	Roberto	Ty	Roberto	Roberto	Craig R.				
7	Jay	Frank	Chris L.	Kasey	Justin	Craig R.	Justin (Note: In episode 6, Justin was disqualified from the competition after it was discovered that he had a girlfriend back at home, and he was just using the show and Ali for publicity.)				
8	Chris N.	Steve	Justin	Craig R.	Ty	Chris N.					
9	Kasey	Chris L.	Steve	Frank	Kasey	Kasey					
10	Kyle	Kirk	Kirk	Jonathan	Jesse; Jonathan						
11	Roberto	John C.	John C.	Justin	Jesse; Jonathan						
12	Craig M.	Chris N.	Craig R.	John C. Steve							
13	John N.	Chris H.	Chris N.	John C. Steve							
14	Tyler V.	Hunter	Jonathan	Hunter							
15	John C.	Craig M.	Chris H. Craig M. Tyler V.								
16	Jonathan	Jonathan	Chris H. Craig M. Tyler V.								
17	Craig R.	Kasey	Chris H. Craig M. Tyler V.								
18	Steve	Derek; Derrick; Jason; Jay; John N. Kyle; Phil; Tyler M.									
19	Kirk	Derek; Derrick; Jason; Jay; John N. Kyle; Phil; Tyler M.									
20	Tyler M.	Derek; Derrick; Jason; Jay; John N. Kyle; Phil; Tyler M.									
21	Hunter	Derek; Derrick; Jason; Jay; John N. Kyle; Phil; Tyler M.									
22	Derek	Derek; Derrick; Jason; Jay; John N. Kyle; Phil; Tyler M.									
23	Phil	Derek; Derrick; Jason; Jay; John N. Kyle; Phil; Tyler M.									
24	Derrick	Derek; Derrick; Jason; Jay; John N. Kyle; Phil; Tyler M.									
25	Jason	Derek; Derrick; Jason; Jay; John N. Kyle; Phil; Tyler M.									

The contestant received the first impression rose
The contestant was voted off by the other contestants but got a rose instead
The contestant received a rose during a date
The contestant was eliminated
The contestant was eliminated during a date
The contestant was disqualified from the show
The contestant quit the competition
The contestant received the final rose of the show

== Episodes ==
No. overall	No. in season	Title	Original release date	Prod. code	U.S. viewers (millions)	Rating/share (18–49)
49	1	"Week 1: Season Premiere"	May 24, 2010	601	9.08	2.8/8
50	2	"Week 2"	May 31, 2010	602	7.64	2.5/7
51	3	"Week 3"	June 7, 2010	603	7.91	2.6/8
52	4	"Week 4: New York City"	June 14, 2010	604	8.41	2.6/8
53	5	"Week 5: Iceland"	June 21, 2010	605	8.26	2.7/9
54	6	"Week 6: Istanbul, Turkey"	June 28, 2010	606	9.77	3.2/9
55	7	"Week 7: Portugal"	July 5, 2010	607	9.14	2.8/8
56	8	"Week 8: Hometowns"	July 12, 2010	608	9.64	3.1/9
57	9	"Week 9: Fantasy Suites"	July 19, 2010	609	10.07	3.4/10
58	10	"The Men Tell All"	July 26, 2010	N/A	8.87	2.9/9
59	11	"Week 10: Season Finale"	August 2, 2010	610	11.73	3.8/11
60	12	"After the Final Rose"	August 2, 2010	N/A	11.32	3.8/11
