= The Bachelor (American TV series) season 16 =

Season of television series

The Bachelor
- Season 16
- Promotional poster
- Starring: Ben Flajnik
- Presented by: Chris Harrison
- No. of contestants: 25
- Winner: Courtney Robertson
- Runner-up: Lindsey "Lindzi" Cox
- No. of episodes: 12 (including 2 specials)

Release
- Original network: ABC
- Original release: January 2 – March 12, 2012

Additional information
- Filming dates: September 20 – November 16, 2011

Season chronology
- ← Previous; Season 15 Next → Season 17

The sixteenth season of ABC reality television series The Bachelor premiered on January 2, 2012. This show features a previous contestant from The Bachelorette, a winemaker and owner of Envolve wines, from Sonoma, California, 29-year-old Ben Flajnik, who finished runner-up in the seventh season of the show featuring Ashley Hebert. This season returns with 25 women featured in the competition, excluding a senior citizen. (Note: Although Sheryl is included in the ABC website, she is not an actual contestant and neither her age nor location are given there. She is related to actual contestant Brittney.)

The season concluded on March 12, 2012, with Flajnik choosing to propose to 28-year-old model Courtney Robertson. They called off their engagement on October 26, 2012.

== Production ==
=== Casting and contestants ===
On September 6, 2011, Flajnik was announced as the next bachelor, and he was subsequently formally named during the season finale of Bachelor Pad.

Notable contestants include Rachel Truehart, who is the sister of The Janice Dickinson Modeling Agency season 4 contestant Crystal Truehart.

=== Filming and development ===
Unlike previous seasons, traditionally, the contestants would not normally choose to stay the Villa de la Vina in Agoura Hills, California, for long but it appeared for the first night. For the rest of the season, the contestants traveled to Flajnik's hometown of Sonoma and San Francisco in California; Park City, Utah; Vieques, Puerto Rico; Panama City, Panama; Belize and Switzerland. Appearances for this season included recording artist Matt Nathanson and country singer Clay Walker.

== Contestants ==
Biographical information according to ABC official series site, plus footnoted additions.

In week 3, season 15 contestant Shawntel Newton asked to join the cast but was eliminated by Flajnik in that rose ceremony.

Name	Age	Hometown	Occupation	Outcome	Place
Courtney Robertson	28	Scottsdale, Arizona	Model	Winner	1
Lindzi Cox	27	Ocala, Florida	Business Development Manager	Runner-up	2
Nicki Sterling	26	Hurst, Texas	Dental Hygienist	Week 9	3
Kacie Boguskie	24	Clarksville, Tennessee	Administrative Assistant	Week 8	4
Emily O'Brien	27	Chapel Hill, North Carolina	PhD Student	Week 7	5–6
Rachel Truehart	27	Southampton, Massachusetts	Fashion Sales Representative	Week 7	5–6
Jamie Otis	25	Dryden, New York	Registered Nurse	Week 6	7
Casey Shteamer	26	Leawood, Kansas	Trading Clerk	Week 6	8 (DQ)
Blakeley Jones	34	Rutherfordton, North Carolina	VIP Cocktail Waitress	Week 6	9
Jennifer Fritsch	28	Cache, Oklahoma	Accountant	Week 5	10
Elyse Myers	24	Chicago, Illinois	Personal Trainer	Week 5	11
Monica Spannbauer	33	Yuba, California	Dental Consultant	Week 4	12
Samantha Levey	26	Pittsburgh, Pennsylvania	Advertising Account Manager	Week 4	13
Erika Uhlig	23	Charlottesville, Virginia	Law Student	Week 3	14–15
Jaclyn Swartz	27	Newton, Massachusetts	Advertising Account Manager	Week 3	14–15
Brittney Schreiner	26	Colorado Springs, Colorado	Medical Sales Representative	Week 3	16 (quit)
Jenna Burke	27	Loveland, Ohio	Blogger	Week 2	17–18
Shawn Reynolds	28	Cincinnati, Ohio	Financial Advisor	Week 2	17–18
Amber Bacon	23	Port Coquitlam, British Columbia	Labor and Delivery Nurse	Week 1	19–25
Amber Tierney	28	Waverly, Nebraska	Critical Care Nurse	Week 1	19–25
Anna Snowball	25	Grosse Pointe, Michigan	Student	Week 1	19–25
Dianna Martinez	30	San Gabriel, California	Nonprofit Director	Week 1	19–25
Holly Johnson	34	Salyersville, Kentucky	Pharmaceutical Sales Representative	Week 1	19–25
Lyndsie James	29	London, England (Note: Lyndsie J. is originally from London in England, but was residing in Scottsdale, Arizona, at the time of casting and filming.)	Internet Entrepreneur	Week 1	19–25
Shira Astrof	32	Massapequa Park, New York	Actress	Week 1	19–25

=== Future appearances ===
==== Bachelor Pad ====
Lindzi Cox, Blakeley Jones, Jamie Otis, Jaclyn Swartz, and Rachel Truehart returned for the third season of Bachelor Pad. Jamie was eliminated in week 4. Lindzi and her partner, Kalon McMahon, were eliminated in week 6. Blakeley and her partner, Tony Pieper, and Jaclyn and her partner, Ed Swiderski, were eliminated in week 7. Rachel was eliminated in week 8.

==== Bachelor in Paradise ====
Jaclyn returned for season 2 of Bachelor in Paradise. She was eliminated in week 5.

==== Other appearances ====
Outside of Bachelor Nation, Jamie later appeared in the inaugural season of Married at First Sight.

== Call-out order ==
Order	Bachelorettes	Week									
Order	Bachelorettes	1	2	3	4	5	6	7	8	9	10
1	Rachel	Lindzi C.	Kacie B.	Emily	Rachel	Nicki	Kacie B.	Kacie B.	Courtney	Lindzi C.	Courtney
2	Erika	Jamie	Blakeley	Rachel	Courtney	Kacie B.	Lindzi C.	Nicki	Lindzi C.	Courtney	Lindzi C.
3	Amber B.	Rachel	Courtney	Lindzi C.	Jennifer	Lindzi C.	Rachel	Lindzi C.	Nicki	Nicki	
4	Elyse	Blakeley	Jennifer	Courtney	Lindzi C.	Jamie	Nicki	Courtney	Kacie B.	Kacie B.	
5	Jenna	Emily	Emily	Kacie B.	Jamie	Rachel	Courtney	Emily; Rachel			
6	Courtney	Kacie B.	Elyse	Elyse	Nicki	Courtney	Emily	Emily; Rachel			
7	Emily	Casey S.	Jaclyn	Jamie	Kacie B.	Casey S.	Jamie				
8	Samantha	Brittney	Erika	Jennifer	Elyse	Blakeley	Casey S. (Note: Casey S. was removed from the show after admitting to still being in love with her ex-boyfriend at home.)				
9	Casey S.	Erika	Rachel	Casey S.	Blakeley	Emily	Blakeley				
10	Amber T.	Shawn	Lindzi C.	Blakeley	Casey S.	Jennifer					
11	Holly	Nicki	Nicki	Monica	Emily	Elyse					
12	Jamie	Jennifer	Casey S.	Nicki	Monica						
13	Shira	Elyse	Samantha	Samantha	Samantha						
14	Blakeley	Samantha	Monica	Erika; Jaclyn							
15	Brittney (Note: In week 1, Brittney's grandmother, Sheryl, exited the limo to meet Ben before her.)	Courtney	Jamie	Erika; Jaclyn							
16	Nicki	Jaclyn	Brittney	Brittney							
17	Dianna	Monica	Jenna; Shawn								
18	Jennifer	Jenna	Jenna; Shawn								
19	Lyndsie J.	Amber B. Amber T. Anna; Dianna; Holly; Lyndsie J. Shira									
20	Anna	Amber B. Amber T. Anna; Dianna; Holly; Lyndsie J. Shira									
21	Monica	Amber B. Amber T. Anna; Dianna; Holly; Lyndsie J. Shira									
22	Jaclyn	Amber B. Amber T. Anna; Dianna; Holly; Lyndsie J. Shira									
23	Shawn	Amber B. Amber T. Anna; Dianna; Holly; Lyndsie J. Shira									
24	Kacie B.	Amber B. Amber T. Anna; Dianna; Holly; Lyndsie J. Shira									
25	Lindzi C.	Amber B. Amber T. Anna; Dianna; Holly; Lyndsie J. Shira									

The contestant received the first impression rose
The contestant received a rose during the date
The contestant was eliminated
The contestant was eliminated during the date
The contestant was eliminated outside the rose ceremony
The contestant quit the competition
The contestant was disqualified from the competition
The previously eliminated contestant asked for a chance to return, but was denied
The contestant won the competition

== Episodes ==
No. overall	No. in season	Title	Original release date	Prod. code	U.S. viewers (millions)	Rating/share (18–49)
141	1	"Week 1: Season Premiere"	January 2, 2012	1601	7.78	2.4/6
There were no dates during the first week. Ben begins his quest for love in Los Angeles, where he meets 25 new bachelorettes. Memorable moments at the ladies arriving in the mansion, Sheryl, the 72-year-old retiree from Colorado came to escort her granddaughter Brittney to the mansion, and she is not an actual contestant. Emily getting sanitized along her and Ben's hands and got her first kiss with Ben. Samantha is impressed on wearing a pageant sash. Notably, Lindzi C., rode on a horse to meet the leading man. Ben got blindfolded over Dianna's candy taste and fits Holly's big hat. Monica takes a heated argument over Jenna and makes her impression with Blakeley. At the start of the rose ceremony, Jenna was not there, her name was not called and was sobbing in the bathroom. She made it just few minutes late. Ben later gave Lindzi C. the first impression rose. Amber B., Amber T., Anna, Dianna, Holly, Lyndsie J., and Shira were sent home at the first rose ceremony.
142	2	"Week 2: Sonoma"	January 9, 2012	1602	7.31	2.2/5
Prologue: This episode takes place in Ben's hometown of Sonoma. One-on-one date: Kacie B. Kacie B. and Ben drive around the city, and Kacie B. shows off her baton twirling skills. The two then travel to Sebastiani Theatre to watch their personal home videos, including footage of Ben's childhood years and a picture of his family that includes his late father. Kacie B. gets the rose. Group date: Brittney, Rachel, Jennifer, Blakeley, Emily, Jenna, Shawn, Monica, Jamie, Samantha, Nicki and Jaclyn. The girls take part in a theatrical play for children in Sonoma. Some of the ladies have issues with Blakeley's outfit selection, believing it to be too sexy for a children's play. After the play, Blakeley plays a confident game in an attempt to impress Ben. Blakeley gets the rose. One-on-one date: Courtney. Courtney and Ben, along with Ben's dog Scotch, go for a walk in the woods for a natural date. Courtney tells Ben that she has dated Jesse Metcalfe during dinner. Courtney gets the rose. Cocktail party: Blakeley leaves the party, feeling targeted by the other women, and cries in the luggage room. Jenna begins crying and has a bit of a meltdown. Later, Ben comforts Blakeley in the luggage room, and has to wake up Jenna before they can start the rose ceremony. Rose ceremony: Jenna and Shawn are sent home in the rose ceremony, with only sixteen ladies left in the competition.
143	3	"Week 3: San Francisco"	January 16, 2012	1603	7.43	2.4/6
Prologue: Ben meets with his sister Julia to talk about the women. Ben humorously suggests that Jennifer is the best kisser. One-on-one date: Emily. They climb to the top of the San Francisco–Oakland Bay Bridge and kiss over the bridge. Emily gets the rose and the two watch a fireworks show. Group date: Blakeley, Jaclyn, Kacie B., Erika, Samantha, Monica, Nicki, Casey S., Elyse, Jamie, Rachel. The women ski down a blocked-off street on fake snow, wearing bikinis. Some ladies struggle while skiing, and Kacie B. skis backwards. Ben gives the rose to Rachel. One-on-one date: Lindzi C. The night before the date, Brittney was scheduled to have a one-on-one date with Ben. Upon receiving the date card, Brittney realizes her uncertainty about her feelings for Ben, and she decides to leave the competition. Brittney informs Ben while he is on the Group date. The next day, Ben had unexpectedly changing the date to Lindzi C. That evening, Lindzi C. and Ben ride a trolley car around the city, making a stop for ice cream cones and ending at San Francisco City Hall. They dance on a ballroom floor while Matt Nathanson performs on the stage. Lindzi C. tells Ben that her previous relationship ended when she was sent a breakup text. Lindzi C. gets the rose. Cocktail party: An unexpected "visitor" arrives to crash the cocktail party, revealed to be Shawntel N., who had previously competed on Brad's second season. Shawntel N. asks to return to the show in order to declare her love for Ben, whom she had previously met at a Bachelor cocktail party. After the women harshly attack Shawntel N.'s desire to return, Ben does not give her a rose, stating it would be unfair to the rest of the women. Shawntel N. is disappointed in his decision. Rose ceremony: After Ben gives out the last rose, Erika suffers a fainting attack, but recovers. Ben's final decision is to not give the last rose to either Erika, Jaclyn, or Shawntel N. and all three are eliminated immediately. Ben declares to the final thirteen ladies that they are all traveling to Utah.
144	4	"Week 4: Park City, Utah"	January 23, 2012	1604	8.30	2.7/7
One-on-one date: Rachel. The two take a helicopter to a lake, for a canoe ride and a picnic. They kiss, but only have average chemistry. At dinner that night, and Rachel tells Ben about her previous relationship and how she is trying to be open with him. Rachel receives the rose. Group date: Courtney, Lindzi C., Jamie, Nicki, Kacie B., Blakeley, Casey S., and Samantha. They travel to a range horseback trail and ride on horseback to a river for fly fishing, to catch their lunch. Ben is a good fly fisherman. At the end, Ben gives the rose to Courtney. One-on-one date: Jennifer. They rappel 300 feet (91 m) into a crater and swim in the water below. They ride on a chairlift and attend a Clay Walker concert. Jennifer receives the rose. Cocktail party: Emily approaches Ben to tell him she does not believe Courtney is there for the right reasons. Emily later tells the other women about her conversation with Ben, including Casey S., who objects to Emily's opinion. (Casey S. is Courtney's only confidante in the house and defends her through the entire season.) Casey S. tells Courtney about Emily's conversation with Ben. This leads to a confrontation prior to the rose ceremony between Courtney, Emily, Casey S., and Kacie B. Meanwhile, Ben asks Samantha to leave, stating that he doesn't see a future for them together. Rose ceremony: Ben expresses his feelings with the other ladies. Emily and Monica are the bottom two. Monica is sent home. Ben announces to the remaining ladies that they are leaving the United States mainland to visit Puerto Rico, one of the U.S. territories in the Caribbean.
145	5	"Week 5: Puerto Rico"	January 30, 2012	1605	8.17	2.6/7
One-on-one date: Nicki. While the date card received at the house and written in Spanish, Emily understood the language and translated it to English. They took a helicopter tour and planned to walk on the streets of Old San Juan where Ben bought her a shaved ice, but it started raining. Once the rain stopped, they went shopping for new clothes and watched a wedding. Since Nicki is divorced, she told Ben about her previous marriage and received a rose. Group date: Blakely, Casey S., Courtney, Emily, Jamie, Jennifer, Kacie B., Lindzi C., and Rachel. They went to Roberto Clemente Stadium in Carolina to play baseball with Ben. The girls were divided into two teams of 4 and Ben picked Lindzi C. to play on both teams. Blakeley and Courtney were named captains for each team, Blakeley picked Emily, Jennifer and Rachel for the Blue team, while Courtney picked Kacie B., Casey S., and Jamie for the Red team. After 5 innings, the red team had won 10-9. The winning team and Lindzi C. got to continue for the date, while the losing team were sent back to the hotel. In the end, Ben gave the rose to Kacie B. One-on-one date: Elyse. They spent their afternoon on a private yacht and went swimming in the ocean. She told Ben about her plans, quitting her job and missing her best friend's wedding; Elyse did not receive a rose from Ben and was sent home. Following his date with Elyse, Courtney surprised Ben at the hotel with wine and invited him to go skinny dipping (has been notably seen in the promos) in the ocean. He accepted Courtney's invitation. Cocktail party: Emily apologized to Ben for voicing her opinions about Courtney during the previous rose ceremony, but then she continued to talk about her, and Ben told her that she should be careful. Then, the other ladies have discussed on debating about the skinny-dipping situation and Courtney isn't the only one to skinny dip, they did. Rose ceremony: The cocktail party was over, and Ben starts the rose ceremony for the ladies. Jennifer was sent home in the rose ceremony, leaving devastated and cried. Later, Ben and the nine ladies to travel to Panama City, Panama.
146	6	"Week 6: Panama"	February 6, 2012	1606	8.35	2.6/7
One-on-one date: Kacie B. She and Ben took a helicopter to San Blas Islands and each was told to bring only three items with them. Kacie B. picked a corkscrew, a stuffed animal and a candy; Ben brought a machete, fishing net and matches. Ben talked to Kacie B. about her past, telling him she had an eating disorder while she was in high school, had suffered bulimia and anorexia. Kacie B. got the rose for the third time. Group date: Emily, Nicki, Lindzi C., Casey S., Jamie and Courtney. Ben took them on a speedboat to Embera village, where the women assist them in applying tattoos. The women of the village wear ornate beaded necklaces at tops, but most of the women elect to keep their bathing suit tops on under the beads. Courtney was the only woman who did not wear a top and ended up exposing her breasts to Ben and the women. That night, Ben and Lindzi C. have no drama and she gets worried. Then, Jamie makes a speech to Ben, and he is concerned that she has not shown her feelings yet. Meanwhile, Courtney sabotages Jamie's kiss with Ben by prancing around in her bathing suit and distracting him. Emily finally apologizes to Courtney for the remarks she made about her the previous week. Courtney does not accept the apology and states that she is not there to make friends. In the end, Ben gave the rose to Lindzi C. Two-on-one date: Blakeley and Rachel. They go Salsa dancing. Blakeley tries to use her sex appeal to win over Ben, Rachel however was great at dancing. Then, they go to dinner in a restaurant. Blakeley shows Ben a scrapbook she had made of their time together with his name written on it and cut-out pictures. Rachel received the rose and, in the end, Blakeley was sent home. Chris arrived to the hotel after all the dates had end, he sees Casey S. and have to talk about her on-and-off boyfriend; it was revealed by multiple people back in the U.S. and discovered that Casey S. and her boyfriend are still together. When Chris and Casey S. went to Ben's room, she talked with Ben about her relationship with her boyfriend. After the dramatic conversation, she was sent home. Cocktail party: The cocktail party was shortened because of Casey S.' unexpected exit. Though Jamie tried to make a connection with Ben by guiding him through a play-by-play of their kiss, it ended awkwardly. Rose ceremony: After a short cocktail party, Ben has time to do a ceremony which six roses to stay to become his wife. Ben sent another lady home: Jamie, due to the lack of chemistry Ben felt between them. Afterwards, the six remaining ladies travel to Belize.
147	7	"Week 7: Belize"	February 13, 2012	1607	8.09	2.5/6
One-on-one date: Lindzi C. She and Ben take a helicopter ride to a famous reef circle and jump out, despite the fact that Lindzi C. is afraid of heights. After dinner that night, they write a love story about themselves on a note and send it out to sea in a bottle. One-on-one date: Emily. She flew to Caye Caulker to meet Ben. They ride bikes through town, go shopping and lobster fishing, which is what they eat for dinner. Emily makes a speech about their day and her excitement about possibly bringing Ben to her hometown. One-on-one date: Courtney. Ben apologizes to Courtney for not giving her a one-on-one sooner. They traveled to the Mayan ruins of Lamanai and rest on the steps of the temple where Courtney says she may have "lost the spark" between them and that she is apprehensive about having him meet her family. Then at dinner, the two have a talk about her trouble with the other women and her disdain for them. Ben becomes worried about Courtney not getting along with the ladies and that he may end up with a woman that none of his friends like. Group date: Rachel, Nicki and Kacie B. They go swimming with sharks. Rachel becomes worried about getting the rose on this date. Kacie B. tells Ben that she is falling in love with him and expresses how much she wants him to meet her family. She receives the group date rose. Rose ceremony: The rose ceremony was held at the Rojo Lounge, and the producers made all six women go barefoot. Ben cancelled the cocktail party, and before starting the rose ceremony, he pulled Courtney aside to talk to her about her intentions and how she is not there to make friends. Courtney says she does not want him to question her intentions and that she is exclusively there for him. Despite the other bachelorettes' hope that Ben will send Courtney home, Ben gives the last rose to her, eliminating Emily and Rachel, leaving Ben to meet the families of Courtney, Kacie B., Lindzi C. and Nicki. Months later, Courtney showed up on "The Women Tell All" special, making this was the first time that one of the final two appeared in the special episode. While interviewed from Chris, Blakeley confronted Courtney and told her she was hurt when Courtney called her a "stripper". Courtney talks about not accepting Emily's apology, and later apologizes to the bachelorettes, especially Kacie B.
148	8	"Week 8: Hometowns"	February 20, 2012	1608	8.18	2.5/6
Lindzi C.: Lindzi C.'s hometown date took place at her family's ranch in Ocala, Florida. Ben and Lindzi went horseback riding. Later, Lindzi's mum tells Ben that she got married at San Francisco City Hall, where Ben and Lindzi had their first date. Ben felt a connection with Lindzi's dad. The night ended with Lindzi expressing her love for Ben. Kacie B.: Kacie B.'s hometown date started in Clarksville, Tennessee. Ben arrived at a field to meet Kacie B which was named after her grandfather, Buster Boguskie. She did baton twirling with a high school cheering squad. Kacie B. told Ben about her excitement on meeting her family. Upon arrival in her home, Ben meets her father, mother and sister. Kacie B.'s father doesn't like wines and he is a probation officer. Later, her father asked Ben about his intention with his daughter but didn't seem to approve of the relationship because they don't believe in living together before marriage. Her mother didn't like the idea of Kacie B moving to California. Nicki: Nicki's hometown date started in Fort Worth, Texas, where Ben met her for some shopping in Downtown Fort Worth to buy a pair of cowboy boots and cowboy hats. Ben meets Nicki's parents and her brother. Nicki isn't the only divorced lady, her parents also divorced when she was small. Her father told Ben he gave his support. Courtney: Courtney's hometown date started in Scottsdale, Arizona, where she grew up. Ben took Courtney to her house and met her parents and her sister. Courtney talks to her sister about skinny dipping with Ben in Puerto Rico. Afterwards, Ben and Courtney traveled to a park where they staged a faux wedding ceremony. Rose Ceremony: The Rose Ceremony took place in Los Angeles. Ben was emotional, based on knowledge having visited the folks, as all the fathers had expressed they didn't want their daughters hurt and hoped his intentions would be honorable. Courtney received the first rose, followed by Lindzi, leaving Kacie B. and Nicki in the bottom two. In the end, Ben handed Nicki the last rose, eliminating Kacie B. Ben announced to the three final ladies they were off to Switzerland.
149	9	"Week 9: Fantasy Suites"	February 27, 2012	1609	8.05	2.6/6
Located in: Interlaken, Switzerland; Overnight Dates Ben and his three remaining suitors traveled to Interlaken, Switzerland to begin their dates. Nicki: She and Ben traveled in a helicopter ride to a glacier. They had talked about her father and how he reminds Ben of his own late father and hugged together on a mountain top. Lindzi : She and Ben had a vertical leap jump above the air and rappelled down 300 feet (91 m) ledge. Their conversation is all about Lindzi' s former boyfriend and their bad relationship. Courtney: She and Ben board their train to Wengen and went shopping for a picnic. They talked about her issues with other girls in the competition and that it's all in the past now. Later, they travelled to a wine cellar and she discussed her feelings about the other girls. Then, a surprise visitor arrives: Kacie B, who warns Ben about Courtney and to get closure as to why he didn't choose her in the Rose Ceremony as they had a 'real connection'. Rose ceremony: Unlike previous seasons, there are no personal videos from these women were made. Ben has deep feelings for the Final 3 ladies. Ben gave the roses to Lindzi and Courtney, and Nicki was eliminated. Ben and the two ladies will meet his mother and sister.
150	10	"The Women Tell All"	March 5, 2012	N/A	8.19	2.5/6
151	11	"Week 10: Season Finale"	March 12, 2012	1610	9.23	2.9/8
Located in: Zermatt, Switzerland; Final Dates and Final Rose Ceremony Ben was finally going to introduce his two final ladies to meet his mother, Barbara, and his sister, Julia in Zermatt. Before the first introduction began, Ben admitted to his family that Courtney had been the girl who hadn't gotten along with the other women. Both his mother and Julia expressed concern about Courtney's behavior and her profession as a model. Lindzi C. came in first to meet the family and talked with his mother about a "magic ingredient". During her conversation with Julia, Lindzi C. was asked about Courtney and her problems with the other women. The meeting went over very well and Julia said that Lindzi C. was very likely the person she would choose for Ben. Courtney met the family next and promised that she would be on her best behavior and that she was going to be honest with the family, if Ben would pick her. Despite initial concern, both Ben's mother and Julia were impressed by how kind Courtney was and said that of the two women left, Courtney was most likely what Ben was looking for in a wife. Lindzi C.: Ben's final date with her began on a horse-drawn carriage ride, shared a picnic in the gondola and went skiing in the Swiss Alps. During the dinner portion of the date, Lindzi C. admitted that she loved him. Courtney: Ben's last date with her began with a helicopter ride to Matterhorn and sledding down the mountain. Courtney said that she is now in love with Ben and talks about her trust issues with men. Later, Courtney gave Ben a scrapbook and reveals a photo album, then writes another love letter to him. Final rose ceremony: The proposal time has to come, and Ben has to start his new life as an engaged man. Lindzi C. came in first and was rejected, Ben told her that he is "already in love with someone". When Courtney came, Ben proposed to her and gave her the last rose, which she accepted.
152	12	"After the Final Rose"	March 12, 2012	N/A	9.87	3.3/8
In this special episode immediately following the finale, host Chris Harrison recapped Ben's journey as the bachelor. Ben first talked about feeling shocked by Courtney's behavior on the show, admitting that it was the reason why he and Courtney went for days without talking. He also addressed the allegations of cheating in the tabloids, stating they were all false. Courtney was summoned next and talked about her relationship with Ben. She expressed feeling hurt about their breakup, which occurred a week before Valentine's Day, but admitted feeling responsible for the problems they endured. After their reunion, the couple stated they are taking steps to fix their relationship and are still together. Chris then presented the engagement ring to Ben, which Ben returned to Courtney to renew their engagement. Later, Season 7's bachelorette Ashley and fiancé J.P. Rosenbaum discussed their future plans, including their wedding and having children.
