= The Bachelorette (American TV series) season 5 =

Season of US television series

The Bachelorette
- Season 5
- Promotional poster
- Starring: Jillian Harris
- Presented by: Chris Harrison
- No. of contestants: 30
- Winner: Ed Swiderski
- Runner-up: Kiptyn Locke
- No. of episodes: 12 (including 2 specials)

Release
- Original network: ABC
- Original release: May 18 – July 27, 2009

Additional information
- Filming dates: March 20 – May 22, 2009

Season chronology
- ← Previous; Season 4 Next → Season 6

The fifth season of the ABC reality television series The Bachelorette began on May 18, 2009, with a two-hour premiere. The show features 29-year-old Jillian Harris, an interior designer from Peace River, Alberta, Canada. Harris is the first Canadian Bachelorette in the American franchise. She finished in third place on season 13 of The Bachelor featuring Jason Mesnick.

The season concluded on July 27, 2009, with Harris accepting a proposal from 29-year-old technology consultant Ed Swiderski. Swiderski is the first person to win in the show's history after quitting in the same season. The couple broke off their engagement in July 2010.

== Contestants ==
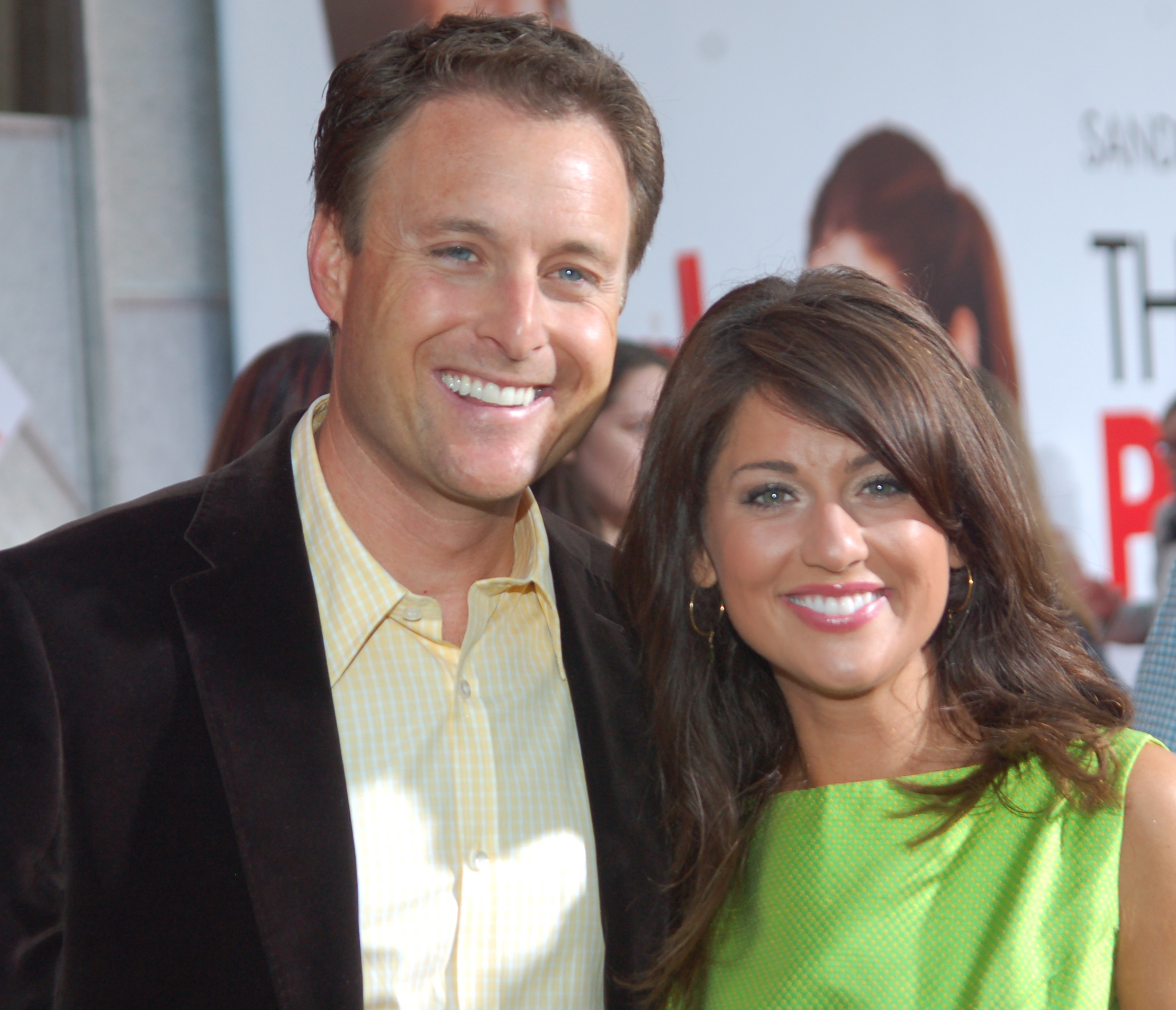
Jillian Harris (right) and host Chris Harrison at the premiere for The Proposal in June 2009

Name	Age	Hometown	Occupation	Outcome	Place
Ed Swiderski	29	Monroe, Michigan	Technology Consultant	Winner	1
Kiptyn Locke	31	Encinitas, California	Business Developer	Runner-up	2
Reid Rosenthal	30	Upper Dublin, Pennsylvania	Realtor	Week 9	3
Wes Hayden	32	Huntsville, Texas	Musician	Week 8	4
Jesse Kovacs	27	Carmel Valley, California	Wine Maker	Week 7	5–6
Michael Stagliano	25	Tacoma, Washington	Break Dance Instructor	Week 7	5–6
Jake Pavelka	31	Denton, Texas	Commercial Pilot	Week 6	7–8
Tanner Pope	30	Brownfield, Texas	Financial Analyst	Week 6	7–8
Robby Descant	25	Spring, Texas	Bartender	Week 6	9
Mark Huebner	26	Woodstock, Illinois	Pizza Entrepreneur	Week 5	10
Ed Swiderski	(Returned to competition)			Week 5	(Note: Swiderski was originally quit in Week 5, but he returned to the competition after the conclusion of Hometown Dates at the end of Week 7 and eventually won the competition.)
David Good	27	West Alexandria, Ohio	Trucking Contractor	Week 4	11–12
Juan Barbieri	35	Buenos Aires, Argentina (Note: Juan is originally from Buenos Aires in Argentina, but was residing in Miami, Florida, at the time of casting and filming.)	General Contractor	Week 4	11–12
Mike Steinberg	28	New York, New York	Baseball Camp Owner	Week 4	13
Brad Seberhagen	27	Park Ridge, Illinois	Financial Advisor	Week 3	14–15
Tanner Fanello	28	Derby, Kansas	Sales Representative	Week 3	14–15
Alexander "Sasha" Petrovic	27	Houston, Texas	Oil & Gas Consultant	Week 3	16
Brian Duke	32	Birmingham, Alabama	IT Consultant	Week 2	17–20
Julien Hug	34	San Diego, California	Restaurateur	Week 2	17–20
Mathue Johnson	25	Andover, Kansas	Personal Trainer	Week 2	17–20
Simon Ambrose	26	Bradford, England	Soccer Coach	Week 2	17–20
Adam Duvendeck	27	Santa Barbara, California	Olympic Cyclist	Week 1	21–30
Bryan Vardeman	28	Lawton, Oklahoma	High School Coach	Week 1	21–30
Bryce Harlow	31	Fort Lauderdale, Florida	Furniture Dealer	Week 1	21–30
Caleb Kuhl	27	Kansas City, Missouri	Photographer	Week 1	21–30
Greg Bilbro	31	Albuquerque, New Mexico	Entrepreneur	Week 1	21–30
John Hardesty	27	Boise, Idaho	Branding Consultant	Week 1	21–30
John Presser	29	Fort Wayne, Indiana	Marketing Specialist	Week 1	21–30
Josh Yocam	25	Tustin, California	Lifeguard	Week 1	21–30
Kyle Swartz	26	Austin, Texas	Graphic Designer	Week 1	21–30
Stephen Reich	30	Lexington, Massachusetts	Lawyer	Week 1	21–30

=== Future appearances ===
==== The Bachelor ====
Jake Pavelka was chosen as the lead of the fourteenth season of The Bachelor.

==== Bachelor Pad ====
Kiptyn Locke, Juan Barbieri, David Good, Wes Hayden, and Jesse Kovacs, returned for the first season of Bachelor Pad. Juan was eliminated in week 1. Wes was eliminated in week 4. Jesse and his partner, Elizabeth Kitt, were eliminated at the beginning of week 6, finishing in 3rd place. Kiptyn and his partner, Tenley Molzahn, were eliminated at the end of week 6, finishing as the runners-up. David won the season alongside Natalie Getz.

Jake and Michael Stagliano returned for the second season of Bachelor Pad. Jake was eliminated in week 3. Michael won the competition alongside Holly Durst.

Michael, Ed Swiderski, and Reid Rosenthal, returned for the third season of Bachelor Pad. Reid was eliminated in week 3 and Michael in week 5. Ed and his partner, Jaclyn Swartz, were eliminated at the end of week 7, finishing in 3rd place.

==== Bachelor in Paradise ====
Season 1

Jesse returned for the inaugural season of Bachelor in Paradise. He quit the show in week 6.

==== Dancing with the Stars ====
Jake competed in the tenth season of Dancing with the Stars. He was partnered with Chelsie Hightower and finished in 7th place.

== Call-out order ==
Order	Bachelors	Week									
Order	Bachelors	1	2	3	4	5	6	7	8	9	10
1	Kiptyn	David	Wes	Ed	Kiptyn	Michael	Kiptyn	Reid	Ed	Kiptyn	Ed
2	Bryan V.	Jake	Jake	Robby	Jesse	Jesse	Reid	Kiptyn	Reid	Ed	Kiptyn
3	John P.	Jesse	Mike	Jake	Mark	Reid	Jesse	Ed	Kiptyn	Reid	
4	Brian D.	Wes	Juan	Reid	Reid	Kiptyn	Wes	Wes	Wes		
5	Jake	Mathue	Jesse	Mark	Robby	Robby	Michael	Jesse; Michael			
6	David	Michael	David	Jesse	Ed	Jake	Jake; Tanner P.	Jesse; Michael			
7	Tanner F.	Robby	Ed	Tanner P.	Michael	Tanner P.	Jake; Tanner P.				
8	Michael	Ed	Sasha	Wes	Wes	Wes	Robby				
9	Robby	Reid	Mark	Juan	Jake	Mark					
10	John H.	Simon	Michael	Michael	Tanner P.	Ed					
11	Sasha	Kiptyn	Tanner P.	Kiptyn	David; Juan						
12	Brad	Mike	Kiptyn	Mike	David; Juan						
13	Mathue	Brian D.	Reid	David	Mike						
14	Simon	Sasha	Robby	Brad; Tanner F.							
15	Jesse	Julien	Tanner F.	Brad; Tanner F.							
16	Julien	Tanner P.	Brad	Sasha							
17	Wes	Mark	Brian D. Julien; Mathue; Simon								
18	Kyle	Brad	Brian D. Julien; Mathue; Simon								
19	Adam	Tanner F.	Brian D. Julien; Mathue; Simon								
20	Stephen	Juan	Brian D. Julien; Mathue; Simon								
21	Juan	Adam; Bryan V. Bryce; Caleb; Greg; John H. John P. Josh; Kyle; Stephen									
22	Caleb	Adam; Bryan V. Bryce; Caleb; Greg; John H. John P. Josh; Kyle; Stephen									
23	Josh	Adam; Bryan V. Bryce; Caleb; Greg; John H. John P. Josh; Kyle; Stephen									
24	Greg	Adam; Bryan V. Bryce; Caleb; Greg; John H. John P. Josh; Kyle; Stephen									
25	Mark	Adam; Bryan V. Bryce; Caleb; Greg; John H. John P. Josh; Kyle; Stephen									
26	Ed	Adam; Bryan V. Bryce; Caleb; Greg; John H. John P. Josh; Kyle; Stephen									
27	Bryce	Adam; Bryan V. Bryce; Caleb; Greg; John H. John P. Josh; Kyle; Stephen									
28	Reid	Adam; Bryan V. Bryce; Caleb; Greg; John H. John P. Josh; Kyle; Stephen									
29	Mike	Adam; Bryan V. Bryce; Caleb; Greg; John H. John P. Josh; Kyle; Stephen									
30	Tanner P.	Adam; Bryan V. Bryce; Caleb; Greg; John H. John P. Josh; Kyle; Stephen									

The contestant received the first impression rose
The contestant was voted off by the other contestants but got a rose instead
The contestant received a rose during a date
The contestant was eliminated
The contestant was eliminated during a date
The contestant quit the competition
The contestant received a rose during the date but quit the competition
The contestant won the competition

== Episodes ==
No. overall	No. in season	Title	Original release date	Prod. code	U.S. viewers (millions)	Rating/share (18–49)
37	1	"Week 1"	May 18, 2009	501	8.69	3.0/8
38	2	"Week 2"	May 25, 2009	502	5.99	2.1/6
39	3	"Week 3"	June 1, 2009	503	6.41	2.2/6
40	4	"Week 4"	June 8, 2009	504	7.19	2.5/7
41	5	"Week 5"	June 15, 2009	505	6.76	2.4/7
42	6	"Week 6"	June 22, 2009	506	6.76	2.3/7
43	7	"Week 7"	June 29, 2009	507	7.94	2.7/5
44	8	"Week 8"	July 6, 2009	508	7.71	2.6/7
45	9	"Week 9"	July 13, 2009	509	8.01	2.7/8
46	10	"The Men Tell All"	July 20, 2009	N/A	8.04	2.8/9
47	11	"Week 10"	July 27, 2009	510	10.00	3.5/10
48	12	"After the Final Rose"	July 28, 2009	N/A	7.99	2.8/8

== Death of Julien Hug ==
On November 3, 2010, Harris mourned the death of Julien Hug on her Twitter page. The 35-year-old Hug was discovered dead on a remote stretch of land off a Californian highway on Wednesday. Harris paid tribute to Hug, saying, "Please say a prayer for the loss of a friend this morning. Life is fragile, don't forget to love the ones you love," before adding, "It's very difficult to find the words to express my condolences. But I will always remember Julien's gentle demeanor and kind heart, which will be sadly missed."
