= The Bachelor (American TV series) season 13 =

The Bachelor
- Season 13
- Promotional poster
- Starring: Jason Mesnick
- Presented by: Chris Harrison
- No. of contestants: 25
- Winner: Melissa Rycroft
- Runner-up: Molly Malaney
- No. of episodes: 11 (including 3 specials)

Release
- Original network: ABC
- Original release: January 5 – March 3, 2009

Additional information
- Filming dates: October 11 – November 22, 2008

Season chronology
- ← Previous; Season 12 Next → Season 14

The thirteenth season of ABC reality television series The Bachelor premiered on January 5, 2009, and featured 32-year-old single parent Jason Mesnick from Kirkland, Washington. Mesnick was the runner-up of season four of The Bachelorette featuring DeAnna Pappas. He became the second former The Bachelorette suitor to compete on The Bachelor since Bob Guiney of season 1 of The Bachelorette and season 4 of The Bachelor.

The season concluded on March 2, 2009, with Mesnick choosing to propose to 25-year-old sales rep Melissa Rycroft. However, during the After The Final Rose special Mesnick broke up with Rycroft after realizing he was still in love with runner-up Molly Malaney. Mesnick and Malaney married in February 2010 and currently live in Washington with Mesnick's son and their daughter. Rycroft went on to marry Tye Strickland and have three children together.

This was the first season Neil Lane Couture sponsoring the jewelry line for this season, replacing Tacori.

== Contestants ==
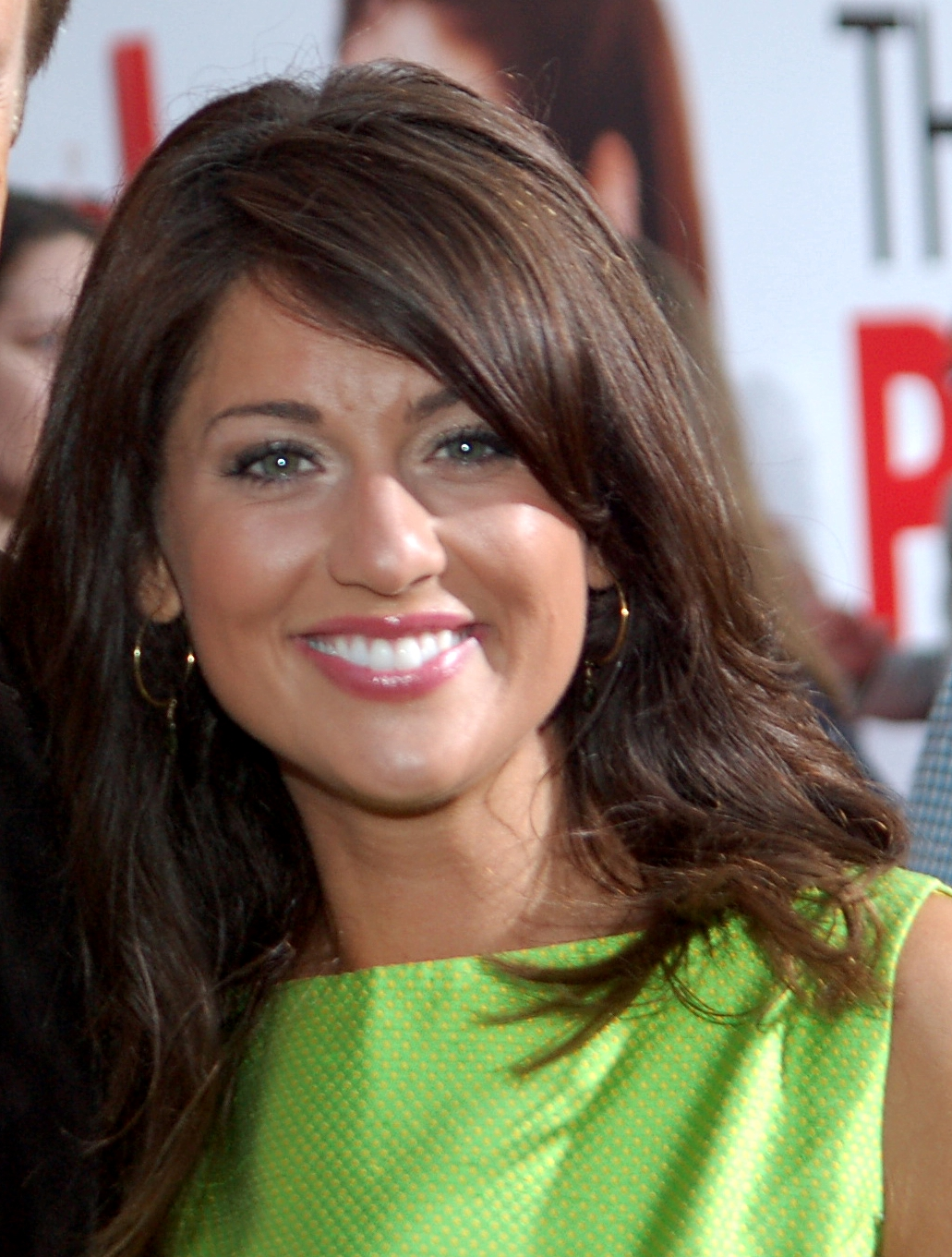
Jillian Harris

Biographical information according to ABC official series site, plus footnoted additions

Name	Age	Hometown	Occupation	Outcome	Place
Melissa Rycroft	25	Dallas, Texas	Sales Representative	Winner	1
Molly Malaney	24	Brookfield, Wisconsin	Department Store Buyer	Runner-Up	2
Jillian Harris	29	Peace River, Alberta	Interior Designer	Week 7	3
Naomi Crespo	24	Carlsbad, California	Flight Attendant	Week 6	4
Stephanie Hogan	34	Huntsville, Alabama	Medical Marketing Representative	Week 5	5
Lauren Wanger	27	Marlboro, New Jersey	Teacher	Week 4	6–8
Megan Parris	25	Sewickley, Pennsylvania	Lacrosse Coach	Week 4	6–8
Shannon Bair	29	Marshall, Missouri	Dental Hygienist	Week 4	6–8
Nikki Kaapke	29	Blue Island, Illinois	Administrative Assistant	Week 4	9
Erica DeSimone	25	Monroe, Connecticut	Account Executive	Week 3	10–11
Kari Fajen	27	Lee's Summit, Missouri	Account Executive	Week 3	10–11
Natalie Getz	27	Morton, Illinois	Human Resources Recruiter	Week 3	12
Raquel Medeiros	27	Recife, Pernambuco (Note: Raquel Medeiros is originally from Recife in Brazil, but was residing in Miami, Florida at the time of casting and filming.)	Medical Student	Week 2	13–14
Sharon Staebell	32	Batavia, New York	Teacher	Week 2	13–14
Lisa Gonzalez	28	Boise, Idaho	Public Relations Associate	Week 2	15 (quit)
Ann Lueders	24	Phoenix, Arizona	Flight Attendant	Week 1	16–25
Dominique Carta	26	Mount Carmel, Pennsylvania	Medical Sales Representative	Week 1	16–25
Emily June	23	Seattle, Washington	Casino Marketing Representative	Week 1	16–25
Jackie Hickley	26	Springfield, Massachusetts	Wedding Coordinator	Week 1	16–25
Julie Dermotta	26	Columbus, Ohio	Teacher	Week 1	16–25
Nicole Mah	25	Calgary, Alberta	Menswear Buyer	Week 1	16–25
Renee Simlak	36	Southfield, Michigan	Jewelry Designer	Week 1	16–25
Shelby Callas	23	Stockton, California	Account Executive	Week 1	16–25
Stacia Mann	24	Orem, Utah	Charity Accountant	Week 1	16–25
Treasure Morgan	28	Salt Lake City, Utah	Nurse Practitioner	Week 1	16–25

=== Future appearances ===
==== The Bachelorette ====
Jillian Harris was chosen as the lead of the fifth season of The Bachelorette.

==== Bachelor Pad ====
Natalie Getz and Nikki Kaapke returned for the first season of Bachelor Pad. Nikki was eliminated in week 5, while Natalie won the season alongside Bachelorette season 5 contestant David Good.

==== Dancing with the Stars ====
Melissa Rycroft competed in the eighth season of Dancing with the Stars, replacing an injured Nancy O'Dell and partnering with Tony Dovolani. She finished in 3rd place. Melissa would compete again in the all-star season of Dancing with the Stars and was partnered with Tony again. They were later announced as winners.

==== Other appearances ====
Outside of the Bachelor Nation franchise, Natalie appeared as a contestant in the Bachelors vs. Bachelorettes special on the season 7 of Wipeout.

== Call-out order ==
Order	Bachelorettes	Week							
Order	Bachelorettes	1	2	3	4	5	6	7	8
1	Lauren	Nikki	Jillian	Stephanie	Molly	Jillian	Molly	Melissa	Melissa
2	Kari	Megan	Melissa	Jillian	Naomi	Melissa	Jillian	Molly	Molly
3	Melissa	Lauren	Molly	Molly	Stephanie	Molly	Melissa	Jillian	
4	Sharon	Kari	Megan	Lauren	Melissa	Naomi	Naomi		
5	Natalie	Naomi	Nikki	Melissa	Jillian	Stephanie			
6	Naomi	Natalie	Lauren	Naomi	Lauren; Megan; Shannon				
7	Megan	Molly	Naomi	Shannon	Lauren; Megan; Shannon				
8	Stacia	Raquel	Stephanie	Nikki	Lauren; Megan; Shannon				
9	Jackie	Stephanie	Kari	Megan	Nikki				
10	Lisa	Melissa	Natalie	Erica; Kari					
11	Stephanie	Jillian	Shannon	Erica; Kari					
12	Treasure	Shannon	Erica	Natalie					
13	Raquel	Lisa	Raquel; Sharon						
14	Shelby	Sharon	Raquel; Sharon						
15	Nikki	Erica	Lisa						
16	Molly	Ann; Dominique; Emily; Jackie; Julie; Nicole; Renee; Shelby; Stacia; Treasure							
17	Erica	Ann; Dominique; Emily; Jackie; Julie; Nicole; Renee; Shelby; Stacia; Treasure							
18	Nicole	Ann; Dominique; Emily; Jackie; Julie; Nicole; Renee; Shelby; Stacia; Treasure							
19	Renee	Ann; Dominique; Emily; Jackie; Julie; Nicole; Renee; Shelby; Stacia; Treasure							
20	Jillian	Ann; Dominique; Emily; Jackie; Julie; Nicole; Renee; Shelby; Stacia; Treasure							
21	Dominique	Ann; Dominique; Emily; Jackie; Julie; Nicole; Renee; Shelby; Stacia; Treasure							
22	Emily	Ann; Dominique; Emily; Jackie; Julie; Nicole; Renee; Shelby; Stacia; Treasure							
23	Julie	Ann; Dominique; Emily; Jackie; Julie; Nicole; Renee; Shelby; Stacia; Treasure							
24	Ann	Ann; Dominique; Emily; Jackie; Julie; Nicole; Renee; Shelby; Stacia; Treasure							
25	Shannon	Ann; Dominique; Emily; Jackie; Julie; Nicole; Renee; Shelby; Stacia; Treasure							

The contestant received the first impression rose.
The contestant was originally voted off by the other women, but received a rose instead.
The contestant received a rose during the date.
The contestant was eliminated.
The contestant was eliminated during the date.
The contestant quit the competition.
The contestant won the competition.

== Episodes ==
No. overall	No. in season	Title	Original release date	Prod. code	U.S. viewers (millions)	Rating/share (18–49)
108	1	"Week 1"	January 5, 2009	1301	8.74	3.1/8
There were no dates during the first week. Jason begins a new chapter for love in Los Angeles spending time with his brother Larry and son Ty before meeting 25 new contestants. Memorable moments of the ladies arriving at the mansion include: Lauren who is the first contestant who gets out of limo and tells Jason her birthday and age. Sharon shows Jason some salsa dance moves, Nikki asks Jason where his son is. Molly was the first lady got out of the fourth limo group and gives tips on playing golf, telling him that she has excelled in golf. Shannon wears funny fake dentures on her teeth in hopes that Jason will see her funny side. Nikki receives a first impression rose, while in a twist Megan received the most votes from the other ladies as the "woman there for the wrong reasons and should leave" during a vote-off, but received instead a rose. Ann, Dominique, Emily, Jackie, Julie, Nicole, Renee, Shelby, Stacia, and Treasure were all eliminated in the first rose ceremony.
109	2	"Week 2"	January 12, 2009	1302	9.06	3.2/8
Prologue/at the mansion: Lisa decided to voluntarily leave the show for personal reasons. One-on-one date: Jillian. Jason meets her at the mansion and heads toward Downtown Los Angeles, they seek out a hot dog stand for Jillian's "hot dog topping test" laughing that Jason who is a ketchup lover, chooses mustard. That evening, Jason surprises the other ladies by hanging out with them by the pool at the mansion. Jason grabs the group date rose, but puts it out of sight so that everyone can remain focused on fun. And in the end, Jillian receives the rose. One-on-one date: Melissa. Melissa is chosen for the next One-on-one date. She travels to a park and they discuss her experience in cheerleading, being a former member of Dallas Cowboys cheerleader. Her future goal is to be a school teacher and is passionate about having kids one day. They share a kiss. Later, they ride a Goodyear Blimp airship, a first for both of them, Melissa receives a rose. Group date: Natalie, Erica, Naomi, Nikki, Lauren, Kari, Sharon and Molly. They meet with Jason for shopping and buying clothes at a mall in Hollywood. Jason gives an impromptu talent show for the ladies on top of the hotel in Hollywood for the evening and Kari, Molly and Sharon give some synchronized swimming routines. Molly receives a rose. Cocktail party: The ladies have one-on-one time with Jason. Megan and Stephanie had spent their time with him and developed a big bond because of their love for their mothers. Megan gets mad when Molly comes in to spend more time after Megan stole her heart with Jason. Rose ceremony: Since Lisa had already eliminated herself earlier in that episode, Raquel, who never had a date, and Sharon were the only ones eliminated in the rose ceremony.
110	3	"Week 3"	January 19, 2009	1303	9.95	3.6/8
One-on-one date: Stephanie. A limo takes her to meet Jason at the beach. She is single mother having lost her husband in a plane crash. That day was her daughter Sophia's Birthday, she had tried to call her earlier in the day but was unable to get a hold of her. She had said to the other ladies, "well, maybe I can talk to her later tonight" being upbeat about it. Jason meets Stephanie on the beach and distracts her as her daughter Sophia runs up behind her - Jason points her out at the last minute and Stephanie's face lights up with joy at seeing her daughter. She looks in disbelief at Jason, then runs to her daughter, catching her up in her arms and they hug and cuddle, with Jason looking on with tears in his eyes. Later Jason, Stephanie and Sophia go to Legoland California for the second part of the date, to celebrate Sophia's birthday. Jason gives two roses to Stephanie one a Lego-made rose and one a grown red rose. Group date: Erica, Jillian, Kari, Megan, Melissa, Naomi, Nikki, Shannon. They participate in an event for a breast cancer awareness group, some ladies cast their breasts and paint designs onto a mache cast for an auction. Jason casts himself also, having covered himself with baby oil. Melissa told Jason that she had breast reduction surgery when she was younger. Jason asked Jillian to talk seriously concerning marriage being one simple step and gives the rose for the date to her. One-on-one date: Natalie. She meets Jason and is given a necklace and bracelet with diamonds for a private jet ride to Las Vegas. They take a helicopter ride throughout the city. Natalie tells Jason that she had a rough childhood. dealing with depression, bears and belief, that she had been falsely stereotyped as being a party girl. They watch a private performance by Kate Voegele and an upset Natalie denies a kiss from Jason, she is sent home. Cocktail party: Many of the girls are discussing Natalie and are glad that she is gone from the mansion. Jason asks Naomi and Nikki about the other girls in the house, but they would not say anything bad about anyone. Jason asks Lauren and she gives information that Erica and Megan are "two drama queens of the house", Megan discovers that Lauren had stabbed her in the back, is angry and confronts Lauren about it. Jason overheard the conversation. Rose ceremony: Erica and Kari were sent home in the rose ceremony.
111	4	"Week 4"	January 26, 2009	1304	10.57	4.0/10
One-on-one date: Molly. Prior at the start of the date, Chris asked the remaining ladies to write a love song for Jason and perform it for him and the rest of the ladies. Molly impresses on her song pick for Jason and was chosen for the one-on-one date. They spend their time in a tent and have a campfire. Molly receives a rose. Group date: Jillian, Lauren, Shannon, Megan, Melissa, Naomi. They were surprised with Jason sending them to Studio City to the set of General Hospital and they meet soap actors Bradford Anderson and Kirsten Storms who tell them they are acting out a fantasy scene with Jason. Naomi got a kissing scene, irking Melissa's affection. They later attend a post-scene party in Hollywood for a night of excitement. Naomi receives a rose. Two-on-one date: Nikki and Stephanie. The two received their deliveries from Alberto Makali (a dress) and go with Jason to a restaurant for a night out. Just before eating, they receive ballroom dance lessons. Stephanie, having had worked previously as dance instructor excels at the dance. And for Nikki, dance is too rough and she dwindles. Then, Nikki tells Jason about her previous relationship on her ex-boyfriend for 11 years, later she was sent home. Jason gave the rose to Stephanie. Cocktail party: The remaining bachelorettes have many issues and some are emotional. Jason confronts Megan and felt that she had not received time with him, and Lauren also confronted as well on really want to give a rose during the group date. Rose ceremony: Just as the roses were given to Melissa and Jillian, Jason has no idea about whom to give the two roses to out of the remaining ladies. He tells them "I'm sorry, I can't do this. I can't give out this final rose." Lauren, Megan and Shannon are eliminated in the rose ceremony and leave shocked.
112	5	"Week 5"	February 2, 2009	1305	11.02	4.1/10
Located in: Seattle, Washington; Prologue: Jason arrives home to his hometown in Kirkland and is greeted by his sister-in-law Leslie. Upon seeing his son Ty, he hugs him around. Melissa and Naomi each had a one-on-one date, and Stephanie, Jillian and Molly had the only group date for this episode, but all of these dates end with receiving no rose. When Melissa is preparing for a date with Jason which is supposed to be a helicopter ride above the Space Needle. Ty doesn't want Jason to leave him. Then, Jason changed his mind and takes a date to his house instead. Melissa is feeling privileged on saw Ty already sleeping, and she is wanting to bring him for a hometown date. Stephanie, Jillian and Molly meet with Jason for a "Best of Seattle" tour, including a boat tour which Stephanie steer up away, Jason brings the ladies to a radio station for an interview. Jason brings Naomi on a seaplane tour of Seattle and she is so happy on her first one-on-one, which includes a rock wall climb, plus a night with drinks by a fire. Naomi tells Jason that her parents got divorced when she was 19, and was feeling a burden on her parents' lives. Stephanie was eliminated in the Rose Ceremony.
113	6	"Week 6: Hometowns"	February 9, 2009	1306	11.59	4.2/10
Located in: Hometowns (dates) and Seattle (Rose Ceremony); Hometown Visits: Jillian – Kelowna, British Columbia; Molly – Grand Rapids, Michigan; Naomi – Lake Elsinore, California; Melissa – Dallas, Texas. Jillian takes Jason to her childhood home in Kelowna to visit her grandparents' home, then she accompanies him to a local winery after being sheltered for many years earlier because her mother was diagnosed with depression. Later, Jason meets Jillian's immediate family including her father holding a Canadian flag that he is going to wear on his back. Next is Molly on her hometown in Grand Rapids, Michigan on a golf course in a local country club for a quick game. And they traveled to her parents' home to meet with her family and Jason surprised on seeing a "hat box" from Molly's mom, and she was given for to draw a picture of Molly. Then, Molly's dad give Jason a reaction that he called him "a good kid", meaning he is anxiously proud of her and she is giving an approval from her parents, Molly wants to pursue her romance with Jason. Third is Naomi's hometown in Lake Elsinore for what is going to be an unconventional meeting. First, Naomi brings Jason to her mother's home for to meet her divorced parents, sister, half-sister and nieces and nephews. Telling that Naomi's worst fears are confirmed after her mother gave a eulogy with a dove struck on a wrecked car and plans to be bury it. Last is Melissa's hometown in Dallas and she surprises him with a tooth fairy box that is to be given to Ty and he is very impressed. Even though Melissa is excited to introduce Jason to her parents, she revealed that they wouldn't be comfortable in the public eye and brings her friends instead, including their families to one of her friend's house. Jason is so disappointed on not meeting her family and wants to understand why. Then, Jason played a pool game with Melissa's friends, and this made the decision for him. Telling her that he was surprised on being given the information about Melissa's parents and them wanting nothing to do with the show. Rose Ceremony: At the Rose Ceremony in Seattle, Jason had a wonderful time with the meetings of the hometowns of the perspective finalists, and has made a harder decision to eliminate one lady at the end of ceremony. He handed the roses to Molly, Jillian and Melissa, which means Naomi was eliminated and had an emotional breakdown. Afterwards, Jason announces the final three ladies to the land of the long white cloud, New Zealand.
114	7	"Week 7: Fantasy Suites"	February 16, 2009	1307	12.52	4.4/10
115	8	"The Women Tell All"	February 23, 2009	N/A	10.93	3.7/9
116	9	"Week 8: Season Finale"	March 2, 2009	1308	15.48	5.4/13
117	10	"After the Final Rose, Part 1"	March 2, 2009	N/A	17.47	6.7/16
118	11	"After the Final Rose, Part 2"	March 3, 2009	N/A	10.90	4.1/11

== After the Final Rose ==
During the "After the Final Rose" special, which was taped six weeks after filming ended, and aired immediately after the season finale, Jason Mesnick told Chris Harrison that he felt the chemistry with Melissa changed and that he would break up with her and then ask Molly to give him another chance. Jason explained to Melissa how he was feeling. After some arguing, she then gave him his ring back, asked him to leave her alone, and left. During Chris' interview with Molly, she admitted she still loved Jason. Jason told Molly that he broke up with Melissa and that he hadn't been able to stop thinking about her. He asked her if they could have another shot and he admitted that he still loved her. She agreed to "see where things go."

On the other hand, host Chris Harrison announced that Jillian became the next bachelorette for the fifth season of The Bachelorette and has insisted that the outcome was not manipulated by show producers to increase ratings.

== Ratings ==
=== U.S. nielsen ratings ===
Episode	First air date	Rating (18–49)	Share (18–49)	Viewers (millions)	Rank (timeslot)	Rank (night)
1	January 5, 2009	3.1	8	8.74	N/A	N/A
2	January 12, 2009	3.2	8	9.06	N/A	N/A
3	January 19, 2009	3.6	9	9.95	N/A	N/A
4	January 26, 2009	4.0	10	10.57	N/A	N/A
5	February 2, 2009	4.1	10	11.02	N/A	N/A
6	February 9, 2009	4.2	10	11.59	N/A	N/A
7	February 16, 2009	4.4	10	12.52	N/A	N/A
8	February 23, 2009	3.7	10	10.93	N/A	N/A
9	March 2, 2009	5.4	13	15.48	N/A	N/A
10	March 2, 2009	6.7	16	17.47	N/A	N/A
11	March 3, 2009	4.1	10	10.90	N/A	N/A

- Episode 8 is The Women Tell All Special.
- Episode 10, the After the Final Rose Special had the highest rated number ever in this special episode in The Bachelor history.
- Episode 11, the 2nd part of the After the Final Rose Special

== Post-show ==
In the season finale, it was revealed that Jason had called off the engagement with Melissa and resumed a relationship with runner-up Molly.

Jason married Molly on February 27, 2010. In addition to his son with his ex-wife, Tyler (born January 25, 2005), Jason and Molly have one daughter together, Riley Anne (born March 14, 2013). They still remained married as of October 2025.

Melissa married Tye Strickland on December 12, 2009. Melissa and Tye have three children together, Ava Grace (born February 16, 2011), Beckett Thomas (born April 20, 2014), and Cayson Jack (born May 18, 2016).
