= The Bachelor (American TV series) season 15 =

Season of television series

The Bachelor
- Season 15
- Promotional poster
- Starring: Brad Womack
- Presented by: Chris Harrison
- No. of contestants: 30
- Winner: Emily Maynard
- Runner-up: Chantal O'Brien
- No. of episodes: 12 (including 2 specials)

Release
- Original network: ABC
- Original release: January 3 – March 14, 2011

Additional information
- Filming dates: September 26 – November 19, 2010

Season chronology
- ← Previous; Season 14 Next → Season 16

The fifteenth season of ABC reality television series The Bachelor premiered on January 3, 2011. 38-year-old Brad Womack, who previously appeared as the Bachelor in season 11, where he rejected both of his final two women, returned as the Bachelor for this season. Womack became the first lead to appear on The Bachelor franchise twice.

The season concluded on March 14, 2011, with Womack choosing to propose to 24-year-old single mother Emily Maynard. The couple announced that they ended their engagement on June 29, 2011.

== Production ==
=== Casting and contestants ===
Casting began during season 14. Potential candidates for this season included Womack, as well as Ty Brown and Chris Lambton from season six of The Bachelorette. Eventually, both turned down the offer. On September 22, 2010, Womack was first rumored as the next Bachelor but he was officially confirmed to return the series five days later during the live show of season eleven of Dancing with the Stars.

Notable contestants included Emily Maynard, who was the fiancée of Ricky Hendrick; and Radio City Rockette Keltie Busch.

=== Filming and development ===
This season traveled to far-flung locales in Las Vegas, Nevada, Costa Rica, the British overseas territory of Anguilla and South Africa. Appearances on this season included Drew Pinsky, Train and Seal.

== Contestants ==
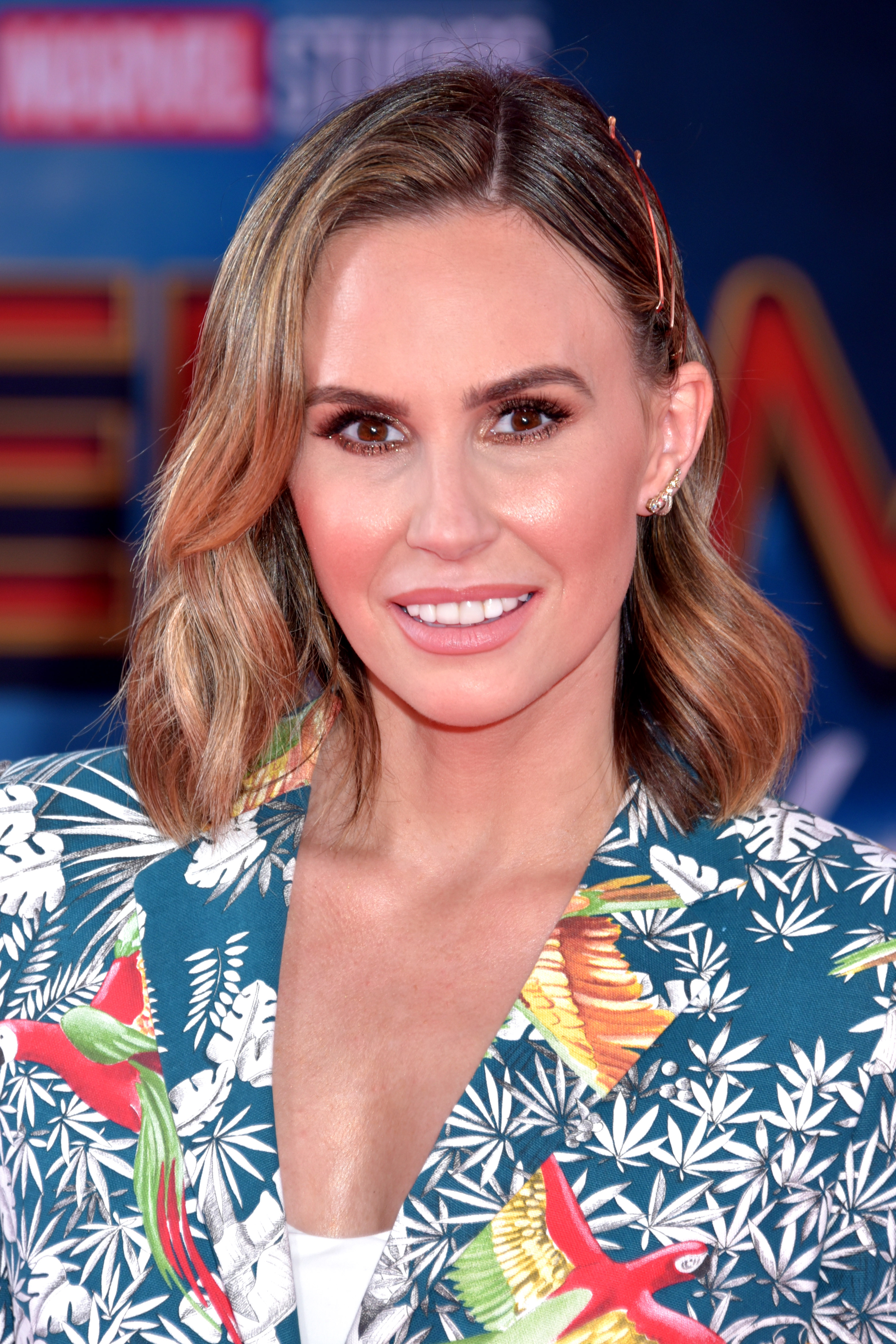
Keltie Busch

The cast was revealed on December 17, 2010. Biographical information according to ABC official series site, plus footnoted additions.

Name	Age	Hometown	Occupation	Outcome	Place	Ref
Emily Maynard	24	Morgantown, West Virginia	Children's Hospital Event Planner	Winner	1	
Chantal O'Brien	28	Mercer Island, Washington	Executive Assistant	Runner-up	2	
Ashley Hebert	26	Madawaska, Maine	Dental Student	Week 9	3	
Shawntel Newton	25	Chico, California	Funeral Director	Week 8	4	
Michelle Money	30	Salt Lake City, Utah	Hairstylist	Week 7	5	
Britt Billmaier	25	Woodinville, Washington	Food Writer	Week 7	6	
Jackie Gordon	26	Newport, Rhode Island	Artist	Week 6	7	
Allison "Alli" Travis	24	Worthington, Ohio	Apparel Merchant	Week 6	8	
Lisa Morrisey	24	Ottawa, Kansas	Marketing Coordinator	Week 5	9–10	
Marissa May	26	Mesa, Arizona	Sports Publicist	Week 5	9–10	
Ashley Spivey	26	Ellerbe, North Carolina	Nanny	Week 5	11	
Lindsay Hill	25	Plano, Texas	First Grade Teacher	Week 4	12–14	
Meghan Merritt	30	Princeton, New Jersey	Fashion Marketer	Week 4	12–14	
Stacey Quirpel	26	Quincy, Massachusetts	Bartender	Week 4	12–14	
Kimberly Coon	27	Orlando, Florida	Marketing Coordinator	Week 3	15–16	
Sarah Powell	27	Denver, Colorado	Real Estate Broker	Week 3	15–16	
Madison Garton	25	Vail, Colorado	Model	Week 3	17 (quit)	
Keltie Busch	28	Sherwood Park, Alberta	Radio City Rockette	Week 2	18–20	
Melissa Schreiber	32	Westport, Connecticut	Waitress	Week 2	18–20	
Raichel Goodyear	29	Fullerton, California	Manscaper	Week 2	18–20	
Britnee Marks	25	Holland, Pennsylvania	Paralegal	Week 1	21–30	
Cristy Caserta	30	Davie, Florida	Attorney	Week 1	21–30	
Jessica "J" Adams	26	Seattle, Washington	Operations Manager	Week 1	21–30	
Jill Ruskowski	28	Frisco, Texas	Sales Director	Week 1	21–30	
Lacey Garbelman	27	Tampa, Florida	Insurance Agent	Week 1	21–30	
Lauren Moore	26	Culpeper, Virginia	High School Teacher	Week 1	21–30	
Lisa Pastrich	27	Dix Hills, New York	Sales Consultant	Week 1	21–30	
Rebecca	30	Mission Viejo, California	Esthetician	Week 1	21–30	
Renee Halpin	28	Palos Hills, Illinois	Nanny	Week 1	21–30	
Sarah Ledtke	25	Saginaw, Michigan	Musical Theatre Performer	Week 1	21–30	

=== Future appearances ===
==== The Bachelorette ====
Ashley Hebert was chosen as lead of the seventh season of The Bachelorette.

The following year, Emily Maynard was chosen as the lead of the eighth season of The Bachelorette.

==== Bachelor Pad ====
Alli Travis, Jackie Gordon, Melissa Schreiber, and Michelle Money returned for the second season of Bachelor Pad. Alli was eliminated in week 1, Jackie in week 2, and Melissa in week 4. Michelle and her partner, Graham Bunn, were eliminated in week 7, finishing as the runners-up.

==== The Bachelor ====
Shawntel Newton appeared in one episode of the sixteenth season of The Bachelor.

==== Bachelor in Paradise ====
Michelle returned for the first season of Bachelor in Paradise. She ended the season in a relationship with Cody Sattler.

==== Other appearances ====
Outside of the Bachelor Nation franchise, Lisa Morrisey appeared as a contestant in the Bachelors vs. Bachelorettes special on the season 7 of Wipeout.

== Call-out order ==
Order	Bachelorettes	Week									
Order	Bachelorettes	1	2	3	4	5	6	7	8	9	10
1	Chantal	Ashley S.	Ashley H.	Ashley S.	Chantal	Shawntel	Chantal	Ashley H.	Ashley H.	Chantal; Emily	Emily
2	Kimberly	Michelle	Michelle	Shawntel	Britt	Emily	Ashley H.	Emily	Emily	Chantal; Emily	Chantal
3	Alli	Kimberly	Jackie	Emily	Michelle	Ashley H.	Emily	Shawntel	Chantal	Ashley H.	
4	Ashley S.	Madison	Emily	Michelle	Ashley S.	Michelle	Britt	Chantal	Shawntel		
5	Meghan	Emily	Chantal	Chantal	Alli	Alli	Shawntel	Michelle			
6	Marissa	Raichel	Sarah P.	Lisa M.	Emily	Britt	Michelle	Britt			
7	Lindsay	Keltie	Alli	Jackie	Shawntel	Jackie	Jackie				
8	Ashley H.	Ashley H.	Kimberly	Ashley H.	Lisa M.	Chantal	Alli				
9	Raichel	Meghan	Shawntel	Marissa	Jackie	Lisa M. Marissa					
10	Madison	Lisa M.	Stacey	Britt	Marissa	Lisa M. Marissa					
11	Melissa	Lindsay	Ashley S.	Alli	Ashley H.	Ashley S.					
12	Renee	Alli	Madison	Lindsay	Lindsay; Meghan; Stacey						
13	Cristy	Sarah P.	Lisa M.	Meghan	Lindsay; Meghan; Stacey						
14	Jackie	Marissa	Marissa	Stacey	Lindsay; Meghan; Stacey						
15	Sarah P.	Britt	Meghan	Kimberly; Sarah P.							
16	Lacey	Stacey	Lindsay	Kimberly; Sarah P.							
17	Lauren	Shawntel	Britt	Madison							
18	Lisa P.	Jackie	Keltie; Melissa; Raichel								
19	Shawntel	Melissa	Keltie; Melissa; Raichel								
20	Britnee	Chantal	Keltie; Melissa; Raichel								
21	Stacey	Britnee; Cristy; J Jill; Lacey; Lauren; Lisa P. Rebecca; Renee; Sarah L.									
22	Jill	Britnee; Cristy; J Jill; Lacey; Lauren; Lisa P. Rebecca; Renee; Sarah L.									
23	Lisa M.	Britnee; Cristy; J Jill; Lacey; Lauren; Lisa P. Rebecca; Renee; Sarah L.									
24	Rebecca	Britnee; Cristy; J Jill; Lacey; Lauren; Lisa P. Rebecca; Renee; Sarah L.									
25	J	Britnee; Cristy; J Jill; Lacey; Lauren; Lisa P. Rebecca; Renee; Sarah L.									
26	Keltie	Britnee; Cristy; J Jill; Lacey; Lauren; Lisa P. Rebecca; Renee; Sarah L.									
27	Sarah L.	Britnee; Cristy; J Jill; Lacey; Lauren; Lisa P. Rebecca; Renee; Sarah L.									
28	Emily	Britnee; Cristy; J Jill; Lacey; Lauren; Lisa P. Rebecca; Renee; Sarah L.									
29	Britt	Britnee; Cristy; J Jill; Lacey; Lauren; Lisa P. Rebecca; Renee; Sarah L.									
30	Michelle	Britnee; Cristy; J Jill; Lacey; Lauren; Lisa P. Rebecca; Renee; Sarah L.									

The contestant received the first impression rose
The contestant received a rose during the date
The contestant received a rose after receiving advice from Ali and Roberto
The contestant was eliminated
The contestant was eliminated during the date
The contestant quit the competition
The contestant was eliminated outside the rose ceremony
The contestant won the competition

== Episodes ==
No. overall	No. in season	Title	Original release date	Prod. code	U.S. viewers (millions)	Rating/share (18–49)
129	1	"Week 1: Season Premiere"	January 3, 2011	1501	9.04	2.9/7
Brad returns to the Bachelor mansion to give his second chance for love and an unexpected visitors come in to see him (Jenni Croft and DeAnna Pappas) in which they discuss in personal opinions and give them a sincere apology during the season 11 final rose ceremony, thoroughly they've going to accept their faith. There were no dates during the first week. Brad meets with not just the normal 25, but 30 new contestants, unlike his first Bachelor appearance. Memorable arrivals including Chantal O., a divorcee, slapped him, Ashley S. brings her own baggage, Alli and Renee present a game of tug-of-war, Madison, shows a set of fake fangs through her tooth, Emily becomes emotional and knows that she is a coal miner's daughter. It was J's birthday and Britnee was retrieved from the limo. Ashley S. received the first impression rose. At the rose ceremony, Michelle received the rose and Chantal O. got the last rose. Britnee, Christy, J, Jill, Lacey, Lauren, Lisa P., Rebecca, Renee and Sarah L. were sent home.
130	2	"Week 2"	January 10, 2011	1502	8.46	2.8/7
One-on-one date: Ashley H. They spent the night at a private carnival. They had a very deep conversation. Brad shared somethings with Ashley that he hasn't shared with anyone regarding his past and family. She got a rose from Brad. Group date: Keltie, Chantal O., Madison, Melissa, Kimberly, Marissa, Raichel, Britt, Meghan, Emily, Shawntel N., Michelle, Lisa M., Stacey, and Alli. They filmed a variety of sketches to advertise PSA and donating blood. Michelle was upset that other girls were kissing Brad. At the after party, Raichel and Melissa argued. Michelle got the rose because it was her birthday. One-on-one date: Jackie. They got massages and spa treatment. She picked out her own dress and got her make-up done. Train was there for a private concert. She got a rose. Cocktail Party: All of the ladies. Ali and Roberto from The Bachelorette came and talked to Brad and the ladies. Brad decided to give the rose to Emily after the discussion with the then-engaged couple. Before Ali & Roberto showed up, Melissa and Raichel were arguing with each other. Rose Ceremony: Keltie, Melissa & Rachel were all sent home.
131	3	"Week 3"	January 17, 2011	1503	8.80	2.7/7
One-on-one date: Ashley S. They went to a famous recording studio and recorded them singing "Kiss from a Rose" by Seal. After, they witnessed the real Seal performing his song in the studio and had dinner on the rooftop of the building. She got a rose. Group date: Lindsay, Shawntel N., Alli, Britt, Kimberly, Sarah P., Chantal O., Ashley H., Lisa M., Stacey, Marissa, and Michelle. They filmed a fake action movie with action director, Steven Ho where they rehearsed stunts and fight scenes called "Love Hurts". Shawntel N. excelled her flawless performance, Michelle ticks away to steal Brad from Chantal for their time and got kiss on Brad. In the end, Shawntel N. got the rose. One-on-one date: Emily. Just before the start of the date, the ladies learned about she lost her fiancé in the plane crash, made her into tears. They flew to a vineyard where they picnicked and later had dinner in a barn opening about her past. She got a rose. In Brad's Bachelor Pad, Jamie, his therapist comes in for a chat and mentions an opinion about Ashley S. and Emily that may able to open up which would make a better connection on them. Cocktail Party: After gave an advice from Jamie, Brad takes Chantal O. to give an apologize not opening up from the previous group date, Michelle steals Brad for an attention that had a fight with other ladies, Madison talks to Brad about her mixed feelings and removes fangs seen with her image. Ashley H. doubts on Brad that shall may understand, when Brad goes back to her and give a kiss. Rose Ceremony: Before the start of the ceremony, Madison walks off and tells Brad to leave that commends her luck. Michelle gave the rose and Stacey got the last rose. Kimberly and Sarah P. were eliminated.
132	4	"Week 4"	January 24, 2011	1504	9.28	2.9/8
One-on-one date: Chantal O. They flew in a helicopter to Catalina Island and walked on the ocean floor and looked at sea life. After, they had dinner at a campfire on the beach and in a tent. She got a rose. Group date: Ashley S., Stacey, Lindsay, Britt, Meghan, Alli, Lisa M., Ashley H., and Jackie. The girls and Brad went on the radio show Loveline with Mike and Dr. Drew and discussed their feelings for Brad. At the after party, many girls fought for Brad's attention. Brad was originally going to give the rose to Ashley H., but after hearing her make negative comments, he gave it to Britt instead. One-on-one date: Michelle. They flew in a helicopter and landed on a high building in downtown Los Angeles to rappel down the side to have dinner at a pool. She got a rose.
133	5	"Week 5: Las Vegas"	January 31, 2011	1505	9.66	3.2/8
Before the start of the dates, Chris Harrison announces the ladies they will be heading to Las Vegas, Nevada to meet with Brad. One-on-one date: Shawntel N. Brad and Shawntel N. went shopping during the day. During the night, both Shawntel N. and Brad went atop a roof to watch fireworks and have dinner. This is where Shawntel N. revealed her work as a funeral director. Group date: Michelle, Alli, Britt, Chantal O., Lisa M., Marissa, Emily and Jackie. They went racecar driving. Emily had a particularly hard time with the date due to the association of racing with her deceased fiance, Ricky Hendrick. Ricky (the son of Rick Hendrick, the owner of the Hendrick Motorsports team) was a NASCAR driver who was killed, along with nine others in 2004 in a plane crash in Virginia. Emily received the rose on the group date. Two-on-one date: Ashley H. and Ashley S. Both ladies got an opportunity to watch and practice for a performance in the Viva Elvis show in Las Vegas. Both ladies had dinner with Brad. The leading man sent Ashley S. home for missing connections. Ashley H. and Brad performed in the show that night.
134	6	"Week 6: Costa Rica"	February 7, 2011	1506	9.81	3.2/8
The date is taking place to the majestic Costa Rica. One-on-one date: Chantal O. They took another helicopter on a scenic ride, then ziplined through the jungle. It rained again before they got to eat dinner outside. Group date: Michelle, Emily, Jackie, Shawntel N., Ashley H., and Britt. They rappelled down a waterfall. No one received the rose. One-on-one date: Ali. They went horseriding and explored a cave full of bats and giant spiders. They later enjoyed dinner floating in the middle of the hot springs; however they didn't have the most intimate conversation. In the end, she went home.
135	7	"Week 7: Anguilla"	February 14, 2011	1507	9.32	2.9/8
The date is taking place to the Caribbean island of Anguilla, and the six women arrived barefoot. One-on-one date: Emily. They had a picnic on the beach and then had dinner. One-on-one date: Shawntel N.. They went to a farmer's market. Group date: Ashley H., Michelle, Chantal O. They did a photo shoot for Sports Illustrated. Ashley and Chantal have posed topless shots, Ashley praises on a photo shoot with seashells covering her breasts. Ashley receives the rose. One-on-one date: Britt. They took a yacht to go cliff-diving. Britt was sent home. Rose Ceremony: The rose ceremony took place beachside at Le Bleu, and the producers made the five remaining contestants go barefoot. This was the first week where there was no cocktail party as Brad felt there was no reason to lead the women on if the conversations were not going to change his mind on whom to send home, which ended up being Michelle.
136	8	"Week 8: Hometowns"	February 21, 2011	1508	10.41	3.4/9
Chantal O.: Chantal O's hometown date took place in Seattle, and gave a visit for Brad on touring the entire city. Then, Brad meets her parents and sees a beautiful sculpture inside her wealthy home. Chantal O's father has solemnly on approval with Brad and gets ready for falling in love with her. Ashley H.: Ashley H's hometown date started in her hometown of Madawaska, Maine where she grew up. Ashley invited Brad on her old workplace in a restaurant where she used to work as part-time and ordered fries with cheese and gravy. Afterwards, they take pictures on Canada–United States border signboard and it would be receive as a souvenir. Then, Brad meets Ashley's family including her sister which Brad is more likely as a friend. Shawntel N.: Shawntel N's hometown date started in Chico, California and gave a tour of the family's funeral home. Brad is look tense on the mausoleum, plus a crematorium with an auto-shut door, crypt room and an embalming room. He meets Shawntel's parents and her younger sisters. While on the discussion for a succession in the family's funeral home, Shawntel's dad is anxious on not giving up the funeral home business and wishes to marry Brad for move to Austin. Emily: Emily's hometown date started in Charlotte, North Carolina and is meeting with her daughter Ricki at the park. Brad is excited to meet Ricki for the first time, but she made herself very shy. Brad receives a present a kite for Ricki and uses it for flying. Emily and Ricki took Brad in her house and shows Ricki's dolls and beauty collection in her bedroom gave Brad for a tour. Emily takes Ricki for a night sleep and saying goodbye to Brad. Rose Ceremony: The ceremony took place in a hotel in New York City. Ashley H. got the first rose followed by Emily, leaving Chantal O. and Shawntel N. at the bottom two. In the end, Brad handed Chantal O. the last rose, eliminating Shawntel N. In the end, Brad announced the final three ladies to South Africa.
137	9	"Week 9: Fantasy Suites"	February 28, 2011	1509	11.33	3.5/9
Brad and the ladies take them into a sunny Mpumalanga in South Africa. Chantal O. and Brad's date take up for a safari adventure with a bunch of sleeping lions, herding elephants and hippos, plus a hangout on a picnic. Then, she tells Brad that would be going to propose and accepts an invitation to a fantasy suite. Brad and Emily come down atop of a dirt road to kick their day, telling about Emily's daughter and wants to be a perfect match for him that would plan to start as a family. Later, they decide to have a fantasy suite willing that they have been falling in love together. Ashley H. and Brad ride over a helicopter into a trip to the exotic lands with an overview of Blyde River Canyon Nature Reserve and landed through the top of God's Window at Drakensberg mountains and had to meet with locals. They have a bizarre and painful conversation about Ashley's personal life, where she told him that her ex-boyfriend had taken his own life. At the Rose Ceremony, Brad watches the ladies' videos in the TV screen made a bit passion and decides one of them would be going home. He had to take Ashley H. for a moment which was a very shocked and has to leave home. Emily and Chantal O. were safe.
138	10	"The Women Tell All"	March 7, 2011	N/A	10.02	3.1/9
139	11	"Week 10: Season Finale"	March 14, 2011	1510	13.86	4.5/13
Brad has one rose left, to give to either Emily or Chantal O. after they meet his family. Brad and Chantal O. swim in shark-infested waters, while Emily's final date is a helicopter tour of Cape Town that includes stunning views of the Cape of Good Hope. Then comes Brad's decision: he chooses Emily over Chantal O. in the finale, leaving Chantal O. hurt emotionally.
140	12	"After The Final Rose"	March 14, 2011	N/A	13.96	4.7/13
This special episode aired right after the finale. Emily does not wear a ring during most of the show, as it was being re-sized. Brad gives her the re-sized ring at the end of the show. Meanwhile, that same night, Ashley H. was announced as the next bachelorette on Jimmy Kimmel Live!. However, Brad and Emily would decide to quit their relationship in June 2011.
