= Melissa Rycroft =

American television personality, host, and dancer

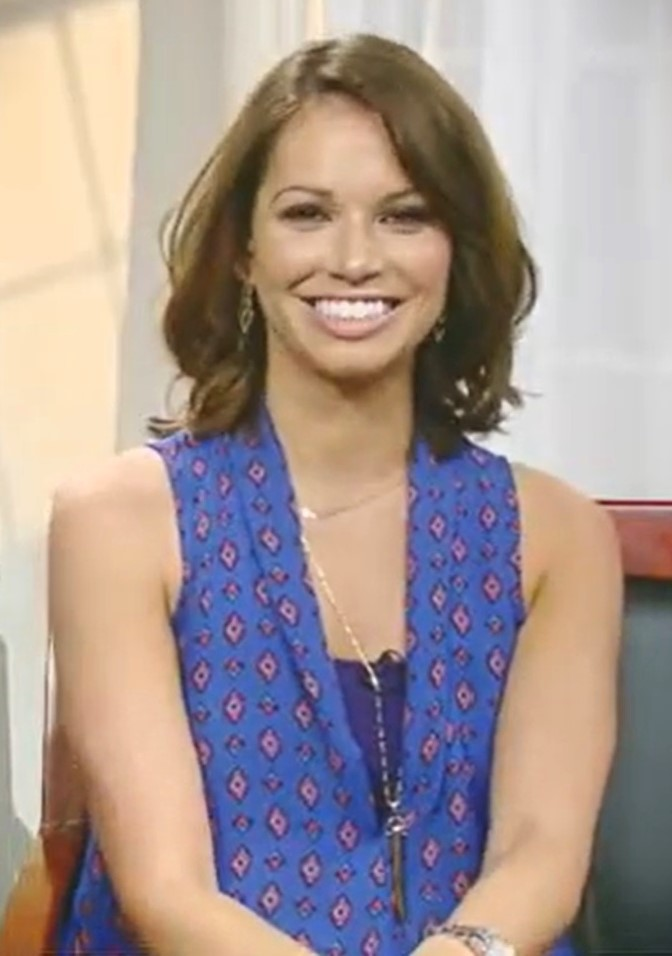
- Rycroft in 2013
- Born: Melissa Katherine Rycroft; March 11, 1983 (age 43); Dallas, Texas, U.S.
- Occupations: Television personality; host; dancer
- Years active: 2006–present
- Spouse: Tye Strickland (m. 2009)
- Children: 3

Melissa Katherine Rycroft-Strickland (born March 11, 1983) is an American television personality, host, and dancer. She is a former Dallas Cowboys Cheerleader. She has participated as a bachelorette on the thirteenth season of ABC's The Bachelor, on the CMT reality TV series Dallas Cowboys Cheerleaders: Making the Team, and on the eighth and fifteenth seasons of ABC's Dancing with the Stars. Rycroft went on to host reality competition shows such as Bachelor Pad and Redneck Island.

== Early life ==
Melissa Katherine Rycroft was born on March 11, 1983, in Dallas, Texas. She studied dance from an early age and served as first lieutenant of her high school drill team. She majored in marketing at the University of North Texas after transferring from the University of Oklahoma, where she was a member of Alpha Chi Omega.

== Career ==
=== Dallas Cowboys Cheerleaders ===
After graduating from the University of North Texas, Rycroft auditioned for the Dallas Cowboys Cheerleaders. She danced for the team from 2006 to 2008. As a cheerleader, she made regular appearances on Country Music Television's reality show Dallas Cowboys Cheerleaders: Making the Team. She also appears on the judging panel for the Dallas Cowboys Cheerleaders auditions and is a showmanship mentor to the training camp candidates.

=== The Bachelor ===
Rycroft appeared on the 13th season of The Bachelor as one of the 25 bachelorettes competing for bachelor Jason Mesnick. In the season finale, Mesnick chose Rycroft over runner-up Molly Malaney, and proposed. Shortly after the proposal, Mesnick left Rycroft, explaining he had feelings for Malaney. Mesnick and Malaney married in 2010.

=== Dancing with the Stars ===
Rycroft first competed on season eight of Dancing with the Stars, where she was partnered with Tony Dovolani and finished in third place. She and Dovolani once again served as partners in the All-Stars season and were announced as the winners on the season finale. She later served as the host of the 2015 Dancing with the Stars live tour. She later returned in season 27 as a trio partner to Juan Pablo Di Pace and Cheryl Burke.

Dancing with the Stars performances (Season 15)

Week #	Dance/Song	Judges' score			Result
Week #	Dance/Song	Inaba	Goodman	Tonioli	Result
1	Foxtrot / "Big Spender"	7	7	7	Safe
2	Jive / "Shout"	8	8	7.5	Safe
3	Samba / "Conga"	9	9	9	Safe
4	Jitterbug / "This Cat's On A Hot Tin Roof"	9	9	9.5* / 9.5	Safe
5	Tango / "Toxic"; Team Freestyle (Shawn) / "Call Me Maybe"	9; 9.5	9; 10	9; 10	No Elimination
6	Viennese Waltz / "Why Ya Wanna"	9.5	10	10	Safe
7	Tango & Cha-Cha-Cha / "Die Young"; Swing Marathon / "Do Your Thing"	10; Awarded	9.5; 10	9.5; Points	No Elimination
8	Quickstep / "Boogie Woogie Bugle Boy"; Paso Doble (Trio Challenge) / "Rumour Has It"	10; 10	10; 10	10; 10	Safe
9	Hustle / "Walk the Dinosaur"; Argentine Tango / "Dirty Diana"	9; 10	9.5; 10	9; 10	Safe
10	Samba / "Conga"; Freestyle / "I Was Here"; Instant Samba / "Life Is A Highway"	10; 10; 9.5	10; 10; 9.5	10; 10; 9.5	Winner

=== Melissa & Tye ===
In 2012, Rycroft and her husband Tye Strickland starred in their own reality show titled Melissa & Tye on CMT. The show ran for one season (eight episodes), from April 20, 2012, to June 8, 2012.

=== Logically Irrational ===
Rycroft and husband Tye Strickland launched a podcast with YEA Networks on November 8, 2018. “Logically Irrational” delved into relationships, family, pop culture, and reality TV. Episodes released Thursday mornings on iTunes.

=== Other shows ===
Rycroft was a co-host of CMT's reality TV show Redneck Island (opposite Stone Cold Steve Austin) during its fifth and final season (titled "Battle At the Lake"), succeeding Jesse James Decker after season four. Rycroft also hosted the Tribune morning show, Morning Dose, and left the show on June 1, 2018.

== Personal life ==
Rycroft was briefly engaged to Jason Mesnick, whom she met on The Bachelor. Mesnick called the engagement off after he admitted he was in love with runner-up, Molly Malaney; Mesnick and Molly still remain married as of October 2025. Rycroft then reunited with a former boyfriend, salesman, Tye Strickland. The couple married and have three children.

=== Legal issues ===
On September 23, 2025, Rycroft was arrested in Southlake, Texas, and booked on a DWI charge. She was jailed for 8 hours before being released on a $1,000 bond. She entered a plea agreement in August 2026, agreeing to 20 months probation, 36 hours of community service, and a $2,000 fine on a misdemeanor charge. On November 1, 2026, Rycroft was arrested again in Southlake on suspicion of DWI, with her bond set at $9,000.

Awards and achievements
Preceded by Donald Driver & Peta Murgatroyd	Dancing with the Stars (US) winners Season 15 (Fall 2012 with Tony Dovolani)	Succeeded by Kellie Pickler and Derek Hough
