= The Bachelorette (American TV series) season 7 =

Season of US television series

The Bachelorette
- Season 7
- Promotional poster
- Starring: Ashley Hebert
- Presented by: Chris Harrison
- No. of contestants: 25
- Winner: J. P. Rosenbaum
- Runner-up: Ben Flajnik
- No. of episodes: 12 (including 2 specials)

Release
- Original network: ABC
- Original release: May 23 – August 1, 2011

Additional information
- Filming dates: March 15 – May 12, 2011

Season chronology
- ← Previous; Season 6 Next → Season 8

The seventh season of The Bachelorette, an ABC reality television series, premiered on May 23, 2011. This season featured 27-year-old Ashley Hebert, a dentist and a dance instructor from Madawaska, Maine. Hebert finished in third place on season 15 of The Bachelor featuring Brad Womack.

The season concluded on August 1, 2011, with Hebert accepting a proposal from 34-year-old construction manager J.P. Rosenbaum. The couple married on December 1, 2012, and have two children. In October 2020, Hebert and Rosenbaum announced their separation and subsequently divorced the following year, making them the first divorce in the Bachelor franchise.

== Contestants ==
Biographical information according to ABC official series site, plus footnoted additions.

(ages stated are at time of contest)

Name	Age	Hometown	Occupation	Outcome	Place
J.P. Rosenbaum	34	Roslyn, New York	Construction Manager	Winner	1
Ben Flajnik	28	Sonoma, California	Wine Maker	Runner-up	2
Constantine Tzortzis	30	Cumming, Georgia	Restaurant Owner	Week 9	3 (quit)
Ames Brown	31	Chadds Ford, Pennsylvania	Portfolio Manager	Week 8	4
Lucas Daniels	30	Odessa, Texas	Oilfield Equipment Distributor	Week 7	5
Ryan Park	31	San Luis Obispo, California	Solar Energy Executive	Week 7	6
Blake Julian	27	Steamboat Springs, Colorado	Dentist	Week 6	7
Ryan "Mickey" McLean	31	Rochester, New York	Chef	Week 6	8 (quit)
Nick Peterson	26	Odessa, Florida	Personal Trainer	Week 5	9
William Holman	30	Fostoria, Ohio	Cellular Phone Salesman	Week 5	10
Ben Castoriano	28	Lake Charles, Louisiana	Lawyer	Week 5	11
Adam West Lee	30	Walhalla, South Carolina	Lawyer	Week 4	12
Chris Drish	25	Moline, Illinois	Sports Marketing Coordinator	Week 3	13–14
Jeff Medolla	35	St. Louis, Missouri	Entrepreneur	Week 3	13–14
Bentley Williams	28	Alpine, Utah	Businessman	Week 3	15 (quit)
Matt Colombo	28	Bridgewater, Massachusetts	Office Supply Salesman	Week 2	16–18
Ryan Miller	27	Novi, Michigan	Constructor Estimator	Week 2	16–18
Stephen D'Amico	27	Portland, Connecticut	Hairstylist	Week 2	16–18
Anthony Santucci	28	Saddle River, New Jersey	Butcher	Week 1	19–24
Chris Malhomme	27	Gibbons, Alberta	Construction Company CEO	Week 1	19–24
Frank Carpenter	29	Anchorage, Alaska	College Admissions Director	Week 1	19–24
Jonathan "Jon" Ellsworth	26	Vancouver, Washington	E-Commerce Executive	Week 1	19–24
Michael Burns	29	Providence, Rhode Island	Technology Salesman	Week 1	19–24
Robert "Rob" Dahm	27	Monroe, Michigan	Technology Executive	Week 1	19–24
Tim McCormack	35	Massapequa, New York	Liquor Distributor	Week 1	25

=== Future appearances ===
==== The Bachelor ====
Ben Flajnik was chosen as the lead of the sixteenth season of The Bachelor.

==== Bachelor Pad ====
Ames Brown, Blake Julian, and William Holman returned for the second season of Bachelor Pad. Ames quit in week 2. William was eliminated in week 4. Blake and his partner, Erica Rose, were eliminated in week 5, finishing in 5th place.

Nick Peterson returned for the third season of Bachelor Pad. He finished as the sole winner for that season.

==== Bachelor in Paradise ====
Nick returned for the second season of Bachelor in Paradise. He left Paradise in a relationship with Samantha Steffen.

==== Other appearances ====
Jon Ellsworth appeared as a contestant in the Bachelors vs. Bachelorettes special on the season 7 of Wipeout.

== Call-out order ==
Order	Bachelors	Week									
Order	Bachelors	1	2	3	4	5	6	7	8	9	10
1	Ryan P.	Ryan P.	William	Ben C.	Constantine	Ben F.	Lucas	J.P.	Ben F.	Ben F.	J.P.
2	Jon	Jeff	Bentley	Ryan P.	Ben F.	Blake	Ryan P.	Constantine	J.P.	J.P.	Ben F.
3	Lucas	Constantine	Mickey	J.P.	Ames	Constantine	J.P.	Ben F.	Constantine	Ryan P.	
4	William	Ben F.	West	Constantine	Lucas	Lucas	Ben F.	Ames	Ames	Constantine	
5	Mickey	Lucas	Constantine	West	Ryan P.	J.P.	Constantine	Lucas			
6	Tim	Stephen	Ryan P.	Mickey	J.P.	Ames	Ames	Ryan P.			
7	Ben C.	Matt	Ben C.	Ben F.	Nick	Mickey	Blake				
8	Stephen	Nick	Nick	Blake	Mickey	Ryan P.	Mickey				
9	Chris D.	Chris D.	Ames	Nick	Blake	Nick	Bentley				
10	West	Ryan M.	Lucas	Ames	William	William					
11	Anthony	Blake	Jeff	Lucas	Ben C.	Ben C.					
12	Rob	Mickey	J.P.	William	West						
13	Ames	Ben C.	Chris D.	Chris D. Jeff							
14	Matt	West	Ben F.	Chris D. Jeff							
15	Jeff	William	Blake	Bentley							
16	Ben F.	J.P.	Matt; Ryan M. Stephen								
17	Frank	Ames	Matt; Ryan M. Stephen								
18	Michael	Bentley	Matt; Ryan M. Stephen								
19	Chris M.	Anthony; Chris M. Frank; Jon; Michael; Rob									
20	Ryan M.	Anthony; Chris M. Frank; Jon; Michael; Rob									
21	J.P.	Anthony; Chris M. Frank; Jon; Michael; Rob									
22	Nick	Anthony; Chris M. Frank; Jon; Michael; Rob									
23	Blake	Anthony; Chris M. Frank; Jon; Michael; Rob									
24	Bentley	Anthony; Chris M. Frank; Jon; Michael; Rob									
25	Constantine	Tim									

The contestant received the first impression rose
The contestant received a rose during a date
The contestant was eliminated
The contestant was eliminated outside the rose ceremony
The contestant was eliminated during a date
The contestant quit the competition
The previously eliminated contestant asked for a chance to return, but was denied
The contestant won the competition

== Episodes ==
No. overall	No. in season	Title	Original release date	Prod. code	U.S. viewers (millions)	Rating/share (18–49)
61	1	"Week 1: Season Premiere"	May 23, 2011	701	9.02	2.8/7
62	2	"Week 2: Las Vegas"	May 30, 2011	702	7.23	2.2/6
63	3	"Week 3"	June 6, 2011	703	8.13	2.6/8
64	4	"Week 4: Phuket"	June 13, 2011	704	7.88	2.4/7
65	5	"Week 5: Chiang Mai"	June 20, 2011	705	7.76	2.3/7
66	6	"Week 6: Hong Kong"	June 27, 2011	706	8.27	2.6/8
67	7	"Week 7: Taiwan"	July 11, 2011	707	8.12	2.6/8
68	8	"Week 8: Hometowns"	July 18, 2011	708	8.00	2.3/7
69	9	"Week 9: Fantasy Suites"	July 25, 2011	709	8.16	2.4/7
70	10	"The Men Tell All"	July 31, 2011	N/A	5.55	1.7/4
71	11	"Week 10: Season Finale"	August 1, 2011	710	9.75	2.8/8
72	12	"After the Final Rose"	August 1, 2011	N/A	9.31	2.8/8
