= Jake Pavelka =

American television personality (born 1978)

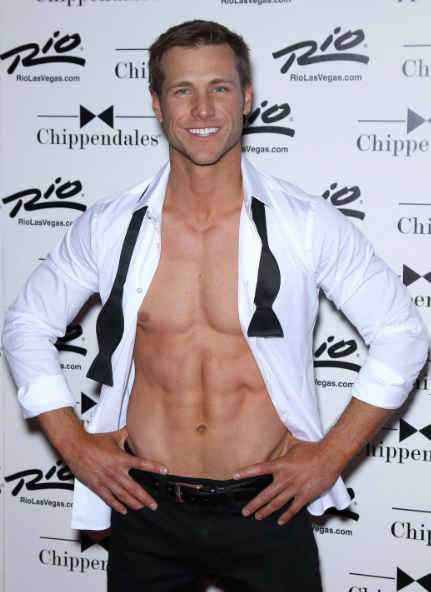
- Jake Pavelka
- Born: Jacob Lynn Pavelka; January 27, 1978 (age 48); Dallas, Texas, U.S.
- Other name: Jake Landrum
- Occupations: Pilot, television personality, model, triathlete, actor
- Years active: 1999–2000; 2009–present
- Height: 1.78 m (5 ft 10 in)
- Partner: Aimee (m. 2026)
- Relatives: Jessie Pavelka (cousin)

Jacob Lynn "Jake" Pavelka (born January 27, 1978) is an American television personality, pilot, actor, and model who appeared on six reality TV programs, most notably The Bachelor.

== Early life and career ==
Pavelka was born in Dallas, Texas to Sallie Lanell (née Mack), a nurse, and James Lynn Pavelka. He is the middle of three sons. His brothers, Jason and Matthew, are both married. He has two nephews. Pavelka grew up in Denton, Texas, and he started taking flying lessons when he was twelve. He eventually worked as a pilot for Atlantic Southeast Airlines, and under the name of Jake Landrum, acted in several television commercials and programs produced in the Dallas area. Pavelka is a cousin of fitness model, television presenter, actor and personal trainer Jessie Pavelka. Pavelka participates in triathlons and has been active in fitness throughout his life.

== Reality television ==
Pavelka first appeared as a contestant in 2009, in the fifth season of the ABC reality show The Bachelorette. He was eliminated by the Canadian Jillian Harris before hometowns but was brought back by the network to star in the 14th season of its series The Bachelor in 2010. The program's run ended with Pavelka proposing marriage to contestant Vienna Girardi in the March 2010 finale. They split up in June 2010.

Following the end of The Bachelor, Pavelka was named as one of the celebrity contestants for the tenth season of Dancing with the Stars. He and his partner, Chelsie Hightower, were the fifth to be eliminated, in April 2010. In July 2011, Pavelka was a contestant on the second season of Bachelor Pad. He was also a contestant on VH1's 2011 reality series Famous Food, and appeared on a September 2011 episode of The CW's reality show H8R. In 2014, he was a contestant on Rachael vs. Guy: Celebrity Cook-Off. On May 23, 2016, he appeared as a surprise guest on the Bachelorette with JoJo Fletcher.

== Other work ==
In June 2010, Pavelka was scheduled to guest-star on an episode of Drop Dead Diva as Toby Devlin, contestant on a fictional reality dating show. On January 14, 2011, he guest-starred on The Bold and the Beautiful.

From February to March 2012, he was a celebrity guest host at the Chippendales' show in Las Vegas.

== Filmography ==
Year	Title	Role	Notes
1999	Walker, Texas Ranger	Young Cordell Walker	
2000	The President's Man	Young Joshua McCord	
2009	The Bachelorette	Himself	Season 5 contestant
2010	The Bachelor	Himself	Season 14 starring role
2010	Dancing with the Stars	Himself	Season 10 contestant
2010	Drop Dead Diva	Toby	Season 2, episode 11
2010	Party Girl Plus One	Bryce Wharton Powell III	
2011	Bachelor Pad	Himself	Contestant
2011	Famous Food	Himself	Contestant
2011	H8R	Himself	Season 1, episode 1
2011–2014	The Bold and the Beautiful	Kyle the Pilot	Recurring guest star
2012	Burning Love	Jeff	Web series
2014	Rachael vs. Guy: Celebrity Cook-Off	Himself	7th Place
2016	The Bachelorette	Himself	Season 12 guest
2017	Squad Wars	Himself	90's Boyband Challenge

Preceded by Jason Mesnick	The Bachelor; Season 14	Succeeded by Brad Womack
