= Jillian Harris =

Canadian television personality

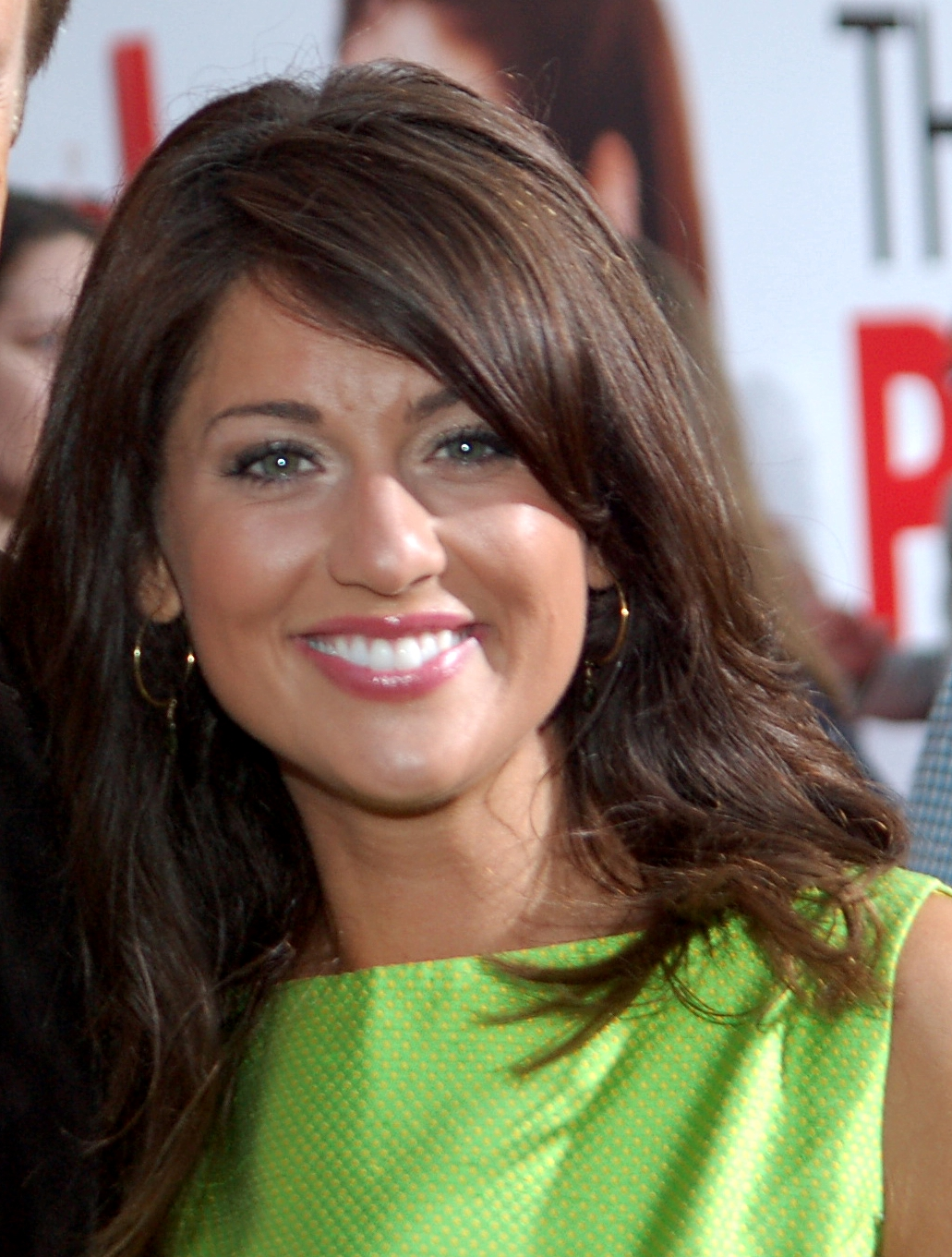
- Born: December 30, 1979 (age 46); Peace River, Alberta, Canada
- Education: British Columbia Institute of Technology (2006)
- Occupations: Businesswoman; interior designer; television personality
- Known for: The Bachelor, The Bachelorette, Love It or List It Vancouver
- Partner: Justin Pasutto (m. 2025)
- Children: 2
- Website: www.jillianharris.com

Jillian Harris (born December 30, 1979) is a Canadian businesswoman, interior designer, and television personality. She is best known for appearing on the television series The Bachelor, The Bachelorette, and Love It or List It Vancouver. She has also appeared on Extreme Makeover: Home Edition, Canada's Handyman Challenge, and The Bachelorette Canada.

== Early life ==
Harris was born in Peace River, Alberta, Canada.

== Career ==
Harris began her interior design career while working at Caban, an interior goods store, which inspired her to begin giving design consultations. She was then hired by Scott Morison, the co-founder of the Canadian restaurant chain Cactus Club Cafe, to design his restaurants. She never formalized her interior credentials, admitting this online to her followers on Instagram in 2024. She was then re-hired by Morison as the designer for Browns Socialhouse, his new chain of restaurants.

=== Reality television career ===
In early 2009, Harris was a contestant on the 13th season of the American TV show The Bachelor, where she competed against 24 other women to win the heart of Jason Mesnick and finished as second-runner-up. In mid 2009, she was selected to be the star of the 5th season of The Bachelorette, making history as the franchise's first Canadian star. She chose Ed Swiderski as the winner of her season, and the two became engaged but later broke up in 2010.

In 2010, she was a designer on Extreme Makeover: Home Edition. She headlined the Calgary Home + Design Show the following year, as part of the HGTV stand. She hosted season one of the Canadian TV show Canada's Handyman Challenge, which aired in 2012.

Between 2013 and 2019, Harris appeared on the Canadian TV series Love It or List It Vancouver, which aired on the W Network in Canada and on HGTV in the United States as Love It or List It Too. She was the show's designer and competed against real estate agent Todd Talbot by redesigning a family's existing home in hopes that they would decide to stay in the home rather than choose to sell it.

In 2016, she made a cameo appearance on the first season of The Bachelorette Canada, counselling Bachelorette Jasmine Lorimer. Harris and her boyfriend Justin Pasutto, a former professional snowboarder, starred in their own four-episode documentary series, Jillian and Justin, which aired on W Network in Canada in June 2017.

=== Other work ===
Harris ran her own brand of interior decor goods, and in 2013, she launched her e-vintage webstore, Charlie Ford Vintage. She has collaborated with brands including Smash + Tess, Joe Fresh, and Canadian Tire to create fashion collections. She has a subscription box, Jilly Box, and an online course titled Jilly Academy. Harris published a plant-based cookbook titled Fraiche Food Full Hearts (Penguin Random House Canada, 2019) with her cousin, Tori Wesszer.

== Personal life ==
She lives in Kelowna, British Columbia. Harris and Pasutto got engaged in December 2016. The couple have two children: Leo and Annie. In June 2018, Passutto, Harris, and Wesszer appeared in the music video for Aaron Pritchett's "Worth a Shot". Harris and Pasutto married in August 2025.

Preceded by DeAnna Pappas	The Bachelorette; Season 5	Succeeded by Ali Fedotowsky
