= Bachelor in Paradise (American TV series) season 3 =

Third season of Bachelor in Paradise

Bachelor in Paradise
- Season 3
- Promotional poster
- No. of episodes: 11

Release
- Original network: ABC
- Original release: August 2 – September 6, 2016

Season chronology
- ← Previous; Season 2 Next → Season 4

The third season of Bachelor in Paradise premiered on August 2, 2016. Chris Harrison reprises his role from The Bachelor and The Bachelorette as the host of the show. The season concluded on September 6, 2016.

Contestant Chad Johnson, who was kicked off the show by producers in Week 1, achieved some level of infamy in 2020 due to his arrest for domestic violence and the launch of a career in pornography.

== Production ==
As with the previous season, filming took place in the town of Sayulita, located in Vallarta-Nayarit, Mexico.

=== Casting ===
During the Women Tell All special, Lace Morris was offered a spot on the third season of Bachelor in Paradise, which she accepted.

The initial cast was announced on June 8, 2016, with returning Bachelor and Bachelorette contestants.

== Contestants ==
Source, contestants names:

Name	Age	Residence	From	Arrived	Outcome
Evan Bass	33	Nashville, Tennessee	The Bachelorette – JoJo	Week 1	Engaged
Carly Waddell	30	Nashville, Tennessee	The Bachelor – Chris; Bachelor in Paradise – Season 2	Week 1	Engaged
Grant Kemp	28	San Francisco, California	The Bachelorette – JoJo	Week 1	Engaged
Lace Morris	26	Denver, Colorado	The Bachelor – Ben H.	Week 1	Engaged
Josh Murray	31	Tampa, Florida	The Bachelorette – Andi	Week 2	Engaged
Amanda Stanton	26	Laguna Beach, California	The Bachelor – Ben H.	Week 1	Engaged
Nick Viall	35	Waukesha, Wisconsin	The Bachelorette – Andi; The Bachelorette – Kaitlyn	Week 1	Split Week 6
Jennifer Saviano	26	Fort Lauderdale, Florida	The Bachelor – Ben H.	Week 3	Split Week 6
Wells Adams	31	Chattanooga, Tennessee	The Bachelorette – JoJo	Week 4	Split Week 6
Ashley Iaconetti	28	Wayne, New Jersey	The Bachelor – Chris; Bachelor in Paradise – Season 2	Week 3 Week 4	Week 3 Split Week 6
Jami Letain	24	Calgary, Alberta, Canada	The Bachelor – Ben H.	Week 5	Week 5
Lauren Himle	26	Ann Arbor, Michigan	The Bachelor – Ben H.	Week 5	Week 5
Tiara Soleim	27	Seattle, Washington	The Bachelor – Ben H.	Week 5	Week 5
Brett Melnick	32	Blue Bell, Pennsylvania	The Bachelorette – Andi	Week 4	Week 5 (Quit)
Shushanna Mkrtychyan	28	Salt Lake City, Utah	The Bachelor – Ben H.	Week 5	Week 5 (Quit)
Izzy Goodkind	25	New York City, New York	The Bachelor – Ben H.	Week 1	Week 5 (Quit)
Jared Haibon	27	Providence, Rhode Island	The Bachelorette – Kaitlyn; Bachelor in Paradise – Season 2	Week 1	Week 5 (Quit)
Caila Quinn	24	Wellesley, Massachusetts	The Bachelor – Ben H.	Week 3	Week 5 (Quit)
Carl King	32	Miami, Florida	The Bachelorette – Andi	Week 4	Week 4
Daniel Maguire	31	Vancouver, British Columbia	The Bachelorette – JoJo	Week 1	Week 4
Ryan Beckett	33	Wellington, Florida	The Bachelorette – Kaitlyn	Week 4	Week 4
Emily Ferguson	23	Las Vegas, Nevada	The Bachelor – Ben H.	Week 1	Week 4 (Quit)
Haley Ferguson	23	Las Vegas, Nevada	The Bachelor – Ben H.	Week 1	Week 4 (Quit)
Vinny Ventiera	28	Delray Beach, Florida	The Bachelorette – JoJo	Week 1	Week 4 (Quit)
Sarah Herron	29	Marina del Rey, California	The Bachelor – Sean; Bachelor in Paradise – Season 1	Week 1	Week 3
Brandon Andreen	29	Costa Mesa, California	The Bachelorette – Desiree	Week 2	Week 2
Christian Bishop	27	Los Angeles, California	The Bachelorette – JoJo	Week 2	Week 2
Leah Block	25	Aurora, Colorado	The Bachelor – Ben H.	Week 1	Week 1
Jubilee Sharpe	24	Miami, Florida	The Bachelor – Ben H.	Week 1	Week 1
Chad Johnson	28	Tulsa, Oklahoma	The Bachelorette – JoJo	Week 1	Week 1 (Kicked Off)

== Elimination table ==
Place	Contestant	Week						
Place	Contestant	1	2	3	4	5	6	
1-6	Evan	In	Date	In	Date	In	In	Engaged
1-6	Carly	In	Date	In	Date	In	In	Engaged
1-6	Grant	In	In	Date	In	In	In	Engaged
1-6	Lace	In	In	Date	In	In	In	Engaged
1-6	Josh	Wait	Date	In	Last	Date	In	Engaged
1-6	Amanda	Date	Date	In	In	Date	In	Engaged
7-8	Nick	Date	Last	Date	In	In	In	Split
7-8	Jennifer	Wait		Date	In	In	In	Split
9-10	Wells	Wait			Date	Date	Split	
9-10	Ashley	Wait		Out	Date	Last	Split	
11-13	Jami	Wait				Out		
11-13	Lauren	Wait				Out		
11-13	Tiara	Wait				Out		
14	Brett	Wait			Date	Quit		
15	Shushanna	Wait				Quit		
16	Izzy	In	In	Date	In	Quit		
17	Jared	Date	In	Date	Date	Quit		
18	Caila	Wait		Date	Date	Quit		
19-21	Carl	Wait			Out			
19-21	Daniel	In	In	Date	Out			
19-21	Ryan	Wait			Out			
22-23	Emily	In	In	In	Quit			
22-23	Haley	In	Date	Last	Quit			
24	Vinny	In	In	Date	Quit			
25	Sarah	Last	Date	Out				
26-27	Brandon	Wait	Out					
26-27	Christian	Wait	Out					
28-29	Jubilee	Out						
28-29	Leah	Out						
30	Chad	Out						

=== Key ===
The contestant is male.
The contestant is female.
Date The contestant went on a date and gave out a rose at the rose ceremony.
Date The contestant went on a date and got a rose at the rose ceremony.
In The contestant gave or received a rose at the rose ceremony, thus remaining in the competition.
Last The contestant received the last rose.
Out The contestant went on a date and was eliminated.
Out The contestant was eliminated.
Out The contestant was eliminated by production.
Quit The contestant had a date and voluntarily left the show.
Quit The contestant voluntarily left the show.
Split The couple broke up and were eliminated.
Stay The couple decided to stay together and won the competition.
Wait The contestant had a wait before appearing in paradise.
Quit The couple left together to pursue a relationship.

== Episodes ==
No. overall	No. in season	Title	Original release date	Prod. code	U.S. viewers (millions)	Rating/share (18–49)
20	1	"Week 1: Season Premiere"	August 2, 2016	301	4.63	1.4/5
Arrival Order: Amanda, Nick, Jubilee, Evan, Vinny, Carly, Grant, Daniel, Sarah, Emily & Haley, Izzy, Lace, Jared, Chad. Chris Harrison informs that, just like last season, if Emily receives a rose Haley will stay, and vice versa. Jubilee receives the first date card of the season and asks Jared on a date. They go on a dinner date and get to know each other. Meanwhile, Lace, Chad, and Grant go to the bar and Lace and Chad make out in private. Suddenly, Chad becomes belligerent and argues with Lace. Chad starts to show more aggressive behavior towards the other contestants, especially Izzy and Sarah. Chad later gets drunk, and then passes out on the beach. Harrison, at the end of his rope, removes Chad from Paradise, and Chad refuses to apologize to the other contestants. Harrison pushes Chad out the door, with Chad shouting expletives at him. The episode ends with "To Be Continued..."
21	2	"Week 2, Night 1"	August 8, 2016	302A	4.54	1.4/5
After saying "Fuck you Chris Harrison," Chad finally leaves Paradise, much to everyone's relief. Leah arrives with a date card, planning to ask Chad out on a date. After being informed that Chad was eliminated, she is dismayed, but asks Nick out instead. They go to a fair, where she kisses him. She thinks the date was great, but Nick thinks Leah is nuts. Shortly after returning from their date, Nick is given a date card of his own and asks Amanda out, which upsets Leah, who thought their date had gone well. At the rose ceremony, Grant gives his rose to Lace, Nick gives his rose to Amanda (much to Leah's annoyance), Vinny gives his rose to Izzy, Evan (very enthusiastically) gives his rose to Carly, Jared saves Haley from elimination by giving his rose to Emily, upsetting Jubilee, and Daniel gives the last rose to Sarah, claiming "He saved the best for last." Leah and Jubilee are eliminated. A day later, Josh Murray, the winner of Andi's season of The Bachelorette, arrives with a date card and asks Amanda out, which means that he and Nick are competing for the same woman, much as they had competed for Andi Dorfman. They go sailing on a yacht and get to know each other. They end the day making out. Meanwhile, Lace and Grant hook up, and Evan kisses Carly, which he thinks was fantastic but she decidedly does not. Later, Evan is given a date card and he asks Carly out. They set a new world record for the longest kiss after eating a habanero pepper, which Carly does not enjoy at all, and she starts throwing up in the restroom.
22	3	"Week 2, Night 2"	August 9, 2016	302B	3.86	1.1/4
As Josh and Amanda spend the day making out, Christian Bishop from JoJo's season arrives with a date card and asks Sarah out. She has mixed feelings about this since Daniel had just given her a rose, but she agrees and has a great time. Carly breaks the news to Evan that she wants to be friends but is not romantically interested in him, much to his devastation. Brandon Andreen from Desiree's season of The Bachelorette arrives with a date card and briefly considers Carly, but asks Haley out instead. He tells Haley that he is sure that he could tell her and Emily apart, and to test this they switch places mid-date. Brandon fails to recognize Emily, and is about to kiss her, but she stops him. Sarah meets with Daniel and they get to know each other better. Evan, feeling down about getting dumped, broods for a long time and decides that he needs to make a bold move, and approaches Amanda and Josh with a handmade date card that says "Evan, you deserve love."
23	4	"Week 3, Night 1"	August 15, 2016	303A	4.74	1.4/5
Evan approaches Amanda and Josh with a handmade date card, and takes Amanda aside for a chat. He expresses his feelings for her and she says she wishes he had said something sooner, but she is with Josh now. She then cries because she pities Evan, who thinks that they have a small connection. The twins note that Brandon never did detect their mid-date switch. Before the rose ceremony, Evan takes Amanda aside again and tells her that Andi Dorfman wrote a book that told of verbal abuse from Josh, and advises caution. Word of this quickly gets back to Josh and he has a talk with Evan, saying that the book was fictional. Meanwhile, Nick also advises Amanda to be cautious. At the rose ceremony, Amanda gives her rose Josh, and Carly gives her rose to Evan. Sarah, Izzy, and Lace give their roses to Daniel, Vinny, and Grant. Emily gives her rose to Jared, and Haley gives the last rose to Nick even though she sees him as a friend, sending Brandon and Christian home. Caila arrives with a date card and asks Jared out. Lace and Izzy are given a "double date" card, and they ask Grant and Vinny out. Later, Evan does not appear to be well and a medic is called. The medic says someone should observe him overnight, and Carly is tabbed for the task. Ashley arrives and sees that Jared is with Caila.
24	5	"Week 3, Night 2"	August 16, 2016	303B	4.41	1.3/5
Ashley arrives with a date card and sees that Jared is with Caila. She is upset about this and Jared encourages her to see other guys, and suggests Daniel. The medic advises Evan to be treated in the hospital, and Carly accompanies him there, where she begins to warm up to him. Ashley asks Daniel out and they have dinner, followed by a visit from Aztec warriors who take the virgin Ashley away to be "sacrificed." Jen Saviano arrives with a date card and asks Nick out. Before the rose ceremony, Ashley takes Jared aside. Jared says that the point of Ashley being there is for her to meet other guys, and if she isn't going to do that, perhaps she should leave.
25	6	"Week 4, Night 1"	August 22, 2016	304A	5.21	1.6/6
Jared continues his conversation with Ashley and lets her know that she should move on because he is with Caila now. The only guy who is not in a relationship is Daniel, so Sarah, Haley and Ashley approach him to try to earn his rose. At the rose ceremony, Daniel gives his rose to Haley, so Sarah and Ashley are sent home. As she is being driven away, Ashley tells the driver to let her out and she returns to Paradise to ask for a second chance, and all agree. Evan is still with Carly, and he says it was the best injury he ever faked. Carl and Brett arrive with double date cards, and they ask Caila and Emily out. Caila is indecisive, but finally decides to go, and does not have a good time on the "booze cruise." She returns to a relieved Jared. Izzy is instantly attracted to Brett when he arrives and starts to question her relationship with Vinny. Grant takes Lace to another part of the resort for a couple's massage to deepen their relationship. Ryan B arrives with a date card. Jared tries to encourage him to ask Ashley out, but he does not. Izzy tells Brett and Vinny that she is only feeling "75%" for Vinny and wants to feel "100%" for someone. Vinny is hurt by this and considers leaving. Later he approaches Izzy to find out where he stands.
26	7	"Week 4, Night 2"	August 23, 2016	304B	4.85	1.4/6
Vinny talks with Izzy and explains that he was hurt by what she said and how she said it, and he departs. Jade and Tanner arrive with a date card to give to the couple that they feel has the best chance of staying together. After interviewing all of the couples, they select Jared and Caila (to Ashley's dismay). Lace thinks that their interview went badly and starts to question her relationship with Grant. After Jared and Caila return, Ashley takes Jared aside and advises caution since Ashley questions the genuineness of Caila's feelings. Jared takes this back to Caila, which upsets her, both because Ashley is questioning her feelings and because Jared seems to trust Ashley more than Caila. Caila confronts Ashley over this and starts to question her relationship with Jared.
27	8	"Week 5, Night 1"	August 29, 2016	305A	5.46	1.6/6
Wells arrives with a date card and asks Ashley out, to everyone's relief. Carly and Evan profess their love for each other. Lace and Grant get into a disagreement, but work it out. Amanda says she is going to bed early and offers their room to Nick and Jen, but Josh is upset by this and wonders why she is going to bed alone without telling him. Later the twins take Nick aside and want to talk about Josh. Nick says he sees flashes of Josh's temper and even though Josh says that what Andi said about him in the book was fictional, what she said about Nick was accurate. At the rose ceremony, the twins decide that they have not found love and do not hand out their roses. Ryan, Carl, and Daniel are eliminated. Before the twins leave, they take Amanda aside and tearfully tell her to be cautious with Josh. Josh demands to know who is saying these things about him, and Nick admits to it. Josh packs his bags and offers to leave, but Amanda convinces him to stay. In the morning, Jami arrives with a date card and whisks Wells off while the others are sleeping. When Ashley awakes and hears of this, she takes it well at first but later starts to focus on Jared again. Caila decides that the situation with Ashley is intolerable and threatens to leave.
28	9	"Week 5, Night 2"	August 30, 2016	305B	5.04	1.4/6
Caila packs her bags and leaves, and after a final discussion with Ashley, Jared accompanies her. Wells returns from his date with Jami and apologizes to Ashley for leaving without saying anything to her. She takes it well. Wells is having difficulty juggling two women whom he cares about. Lauren and Shushanna arrive with a double date card and they ask Brett and Wells out respectively. Wells has a good time with Shushanna and now has three women vying for him. Amanda is given a date card and asks Josh out, and they have a romantic dinner followed by fireworks. Amanda wishes that the others could see this sensitive side of Josh.
29	10	"Week 6, Night 1"	September 5, 2016	306A	4.96	1.4/5
Izzy, Brett, and Shushanna decide to quit the competition. Jami, Lauren, and Tiara didn't receive roses and were eliminated.
30	11	"Season Finale: Week 6, Night 2"	September 6, 2016	306B	5.57	1.6/6
Carly and Evan: They are very much in love with each other. Evan picks out a ring with no hesitation and later proposes to Carly, and she happily accepts. In the epilogue, Carly has moved to Nashville to be with Evan and is looking forward to being the cool stepmom to his children. Carly and Evan married in June 2017 and are currently expecting their first child together. Lace and Grant: In the morning at the fantasy suite, they are still unsure about whether they want to move forward. After both have some time to sort out their feelings, they decide that they really do love each other. Grant proposes and Lace accepts. In the epilogue, Lace has moved to San Francisco to be with Grant. However, on November 28, 2016, the pair announced that they had split and ended their engagement. Lace has since moved back to her hometown of Denver, Colorado. Jen and Nick: Jen is concerned that Nick still seems to have some walls up, but she loves him anyway. Nick picks out a ring, "hopefully for the last time!" Jen professes her love for Nick, but Nick tearfully says that he cannot propose because even though his head is telling him to do it, he cannot convince his heart that it is right. They both leave, with Nick wondering if he made the right decision. Amanda and Josh: Despite being warned about Josh several times, Amanda knows that she loves him. Josh has some worries but overcomes them. Josh proposes and Amanda accepts. In the epilogue, Josh has moved to Orange County to be with Amanda and he loves her children. However, the pair ended their engagement in December 2016. Also in the epilogue, Caila and Jared have agreed to be just friends. Vinny is shown partying and is doing just fine. Chad will never be the next Bachelor. Ashley is still thinking about Jared. Daniel is still single. The twins have not found men but they still have each other.

== Post show ==
Lace Morris and Grant Kemp ended their engagement in November 2016.

Amanda Stanton and Josh Murray ended their engagement in December 2016. Amanda returned to Paradise for season 4.

Carly Waddell and Evan Bass were married on June 17, 2017, in Mexico. They welcomed their first child, a daughter named Isabella Evelyn, on February 15, 2018. They welcomed their second child, a son named Charles Wolfe, on November 13, 2019. They announced their separation in 2020.

Jared and Ashley became a couple in March 2018, and were engaged in June of that year. They were married in 2019.
