= The Bachelor (American TV series) season 20 =

Season of television series

The Bachelor
- Season 20
- Promotional poster
- Starring: Ben Higgins
- Presented by: Chris Harrison
- No. of contestants: 28
- Winner: Lauren Bushnell
- Runner-up: Joelle "JoJo" Fletcher
- No. of episodes: 12 (including 2 specials)

Release
- Original network: ABC
- Original release: January 4 – March 14, 2016

Additional information
- Filming dates: September 24 – November 18, 2015

Season chronology
- ← Previous; Season 19 Next → Season 21

The twentieth season of The Bachelor premiered on January 4, 2016. This season featured 26-year-old Ben Higgins, a software salesman from Warsaw, Indiana.

Higgins attended Indiana University, where he graduated with a BS in business administration and management through the school of public and environmental affairs (SPEA). In addition, he was also a member of Delta Upsilon's Indiana chapter where he served as the vice president of external affairs. He finished in third place on the 11th season of The Bachelorette featuring Kaitlyn Bristowe.

The season concluded on March 14, 2016, with Higgins choosing to propose to 25-year-old flight attendant Lauren Bushnell. They ended their engagement on May 15, 2017.

== Filming and development ==
=== Casting and contestants ===
Casting began during the 19th season of the show. On August 24, 2015, during season one, episode four of Bachelor in Paradise: After Paradise, Ben Higgins was announced as the next Bachelor.

Notable contestant includes previous season's runner-up Becca Tilley and fellow contestant Amber James; news anchor Olivia Caridi from WCYB-TV; and Joelle "JoJo" Fletcher, who is a half-sister of Ready for Love star Ben Patton.

=== Production ===
The season traveled to many places including Las Vegas, Nevada, Mexico City, Mexico, Pig Island in The Bahamas and the state of Indiana, with appearances from rapper Ice Cube, comedian Kevin Hart, soccer players Alex Morgan, Kelley O'Hara, comedian Terry Fator, and Indiana Pacers basketball players Paul George and George Hill.

== Contestants ==
The season began with 28 contestants, including a set of twins.

Name	Age	Hometown	Occupation	Outcome	Place	Ref
Lauren Bushnell	25	West Linn, Oregon	Flight Attendant	Winner	1	
Joelle "JoJo" Fletcher	24	Dallas, Texas	Real Estate Developer	Runner-up	2	
Caila Quinn	24	Hudson, Ohio	Software Sales Representative	Week 9	3	
Amanda Stanton	25	Laguna Beach, California	Esthetician	Week 8	4	
Becca Tilley	26	Shreveport, Louisiana	Chiropractic Assistant	Week 7	5	
Emily Ferguson (Note: Emily and Haley are identical twins. They competed individually.)	23	Las Vegas, Nevada	Waitress	Week 7	6	
Lauren Himle	25	Dexter, Michigan	Kindergarten Teacher	Week 6	7	
Olivia Caridi	23	Austin, Texas	Former News Anchor	Week 6	8	
Leah Block	25	Greenwood Village, Colorado	Event Planner	Week 6	9	
Jennifer Saviano	25	Davie, Florida	Small Business Owner	Week 5	10	
Jubilee Sharpe	24	Fort Lauderdale, Florida	War Veteran	Week 5	11	
Amber James	30	Kankakee, Illinois	Bartender	Week 4	12–13	
Rachel Tchen	23	Little Rock, Arkansas	Unemployed	Week 4	12–13	
Haley Ferguson	23	Las Vegas, Nevada	Waitress	Week 4	14	
Jami Letain	23	St. Albert, Alberta	Bartender	Week 3	15–16	
Shushanna Mkrtychyan	27	Salt Lake City, Utah	Property Manager	Week 3	15–16	
Lace Morris	25	Denver, Colorado	Real Estate Agent	Week 3	17 (quit)	
Amanda "Mandi" Kremer	28	Portland, Oregon	Dentist	Week 2	18–20	
Jacqueline "Jackie" Dion	23	Newport Beach, California	Gerontologist	Week 2	18–20	
Samantha Passmore	26	New Smyrna Beach, Florida	Attorney	Week 2	18–20	
Lauren "LB" Barr	23	Stillwater, Oklahoma	Fashion Buyer	Week 2	21 (quit)	
Breanne Rice	30	Seattle, Washington	Nutritional Therapist	Week 1	22–28	
Isabel "Izzy" Goodkind	24	Branford, Connecticut	Graphic Designer	Week 1	22–28	
Jessica Moser	23	Boca Raton, Florida	Accountant	Week 1	22–28	
Laura Esselman	24	Louisville, Kentucky	Account Executive	Week 1	22–28	
Lauren Russell	26	Houston, Texas	Math Teacher	Week 1	22–28	
Maegan Miller	30	Visalia, California	Cowgirl	Week 1	22–28	
Tiara Soleim	27	Redmond, Washington	Chicken Enthusiast	Week 1	22–28	

=== Future appearances ===
==== The Bachelorette ====
JoJo Fletcher was chosen as the lead of season 12 of The Bachelorette.

==== Bachelor in Paradise ====
Season 3

Caila Quinn, Lauren Himle, Tiara Soleim, Jami Letain, Shushanna Mkrtychyan, Jennifer Saviano, Izzy Goodkind, Lace Morris, Jubilee Sharpe, Leah Block, Haley Ferguson, Emily Ferguson, and Amanda Stanton returned for the third season of Bachelor in Paradise. Leah and Jubilee were eliminated in week 1. Emily and Haley quit in week 4. Izzy, Shushanna, and Caila quit in week 5. Lauren H., Jami, and Tiara were eliminated in week 5. Jennifer split from Nick Viall in week 6. Amanda and Lace left engaged to Josh Murray and Grant Kemp, respectively.

Season 4

Amanda, Emily and Haley returned for season 4. Emily and Haley quit in week 4. Amanda split from Robby Hayes in week 4.

Season 5

Shushanna and Jubilee returned for season 5. Jubilee quit in week 3. Shushanna split from Robby Hayes in week 6.

Season 6

Jennifer and Haley returned for season 6. Jennifer was eliminated in week 3. Haley was eliminated in week 5.

Season 8

Lace returned for season 8. She quit in week 3.

==== Happily Ever After? ====
Ben Higgins and Lauren Bushnell appeared in their own reality series, Ben and Lauren: Happily Ever After?, on the sister network Freeform. Emily and Haley starred in the Freeform reality series The Twins: Happily Ever After?

==== The Bachelor Winter Games ====
Ben returned for The Bachelor Winter Games under Team USA. He quit in week 3.

== Call-out order ==
Order	Bachelorettes	Week									
Order	Bachelorettes	1	2	3	4	5	6	7	8	9	10
1	Lauren B.	Olivia	JoJo	Lauren B.	JoJo	Amanda	Caila	Amanda	Lauren B.	JoJo	Lauren B.
2	Caila	Lauren B.	Caila	Amber	Lauren B.	Olivia	Amanda	Lauren B.	Caila	Lauren B.	JoJo
3	Jennifer	LB	Olivia	Jubilee	Becca	Lauren H.	Emily	JoJo	JoJo	Caila	
4	Jami	Caila	Amanda	Lauren H.	Amanda	Caila	Becca	Caila	Amanda		
5	Samantha	Amber	Jubilee	Amanda	Lauren H.	Lauren B.	JoJo	Becca			
6	Jubilee	Jami	Lauren B.	Becca	Jubilee	JoJo	Lauren B.	Emily			
7	Amanda	Jennifer	Leah	Haley	Emily	Becca	Lauren H.				
8	Lace	Jubilee	Becca	Emily	Caila	Leah	Olivia				
9	Lauren R.	Amanda	Rachel	Rachel	Jennifer	Emily	Leah				
10	Shushanna	JoJo	Lace	Caila	Leah	Jennifer					
11	Leah	Leah	Jennifer	JoJo	Olivia	Jubilee					
12	JoJo	Rachel	Emily	Jennifer	Amber; Rachel						
13	Lauren H.	Samantha	Jami	Leah	Amber; Rachel						
14	Laura	Jackie	Lauren H.	Olivia	Haley						
15	Mandi	Haley	Shushanna	Jami; Shushanna							
16	Emily; Haley	Emily	Haley	Jami; Shushanna							
17	Emily; Haley	Shushanna	Amber	Lace							
18	Maegan	Lauren H.	Jackie; Mandi; Samantha								
19	Breanne	Becca	Jackie; Mandi; Samantha								
20	Izzy	Mandi	Jackie; Mandi; Samantha								
21	Rachel	Lace	LB								
22	Jessica	Breanne; Izzy; Jessica; Laura; Lauren R. Maegan; Tiara									
23	Tiara	Breanne; Izzy; Jessica; Laura; Lauren R. Maegan; Tiara									
24	LB	Breanne; Izzy; Jessica; Laura; Lauren R. Maegan; Tiara									
25	Jackie	Breanne; Izzy; Jessica; Laura; Lauren R. Maegan; Tiara									
26	Olivia	Breanne; Izzy; Jessica; Laura; Lauren R. Maegan; Tiara									
27-28	Amber; Becca	Breanne; Izzy; Jessica; Laura; Lauren R. Maegan; Tiara									

The contestant received the first impression rose
The contestant received a rose during the date
The contestant was eliminated
The contestant was eliminated during the date
The contestant was eliminated outside the rose ceremony
The contestant quit the competition
The contestant won the competition

== Episodes ==
No. overall	No. in season	Title	Original release date	Prod. code	U.S. viewers (millions)	Rating/share (18–49)
191	1	"Week 1: Season Premiere"	January 4, 2016	2001	7.55	2.2/7
Season 20 begins with Ben at the Bachelor Mansion. He meets with three former Bachelors Jason Mesnick, Sean Lowe and Chris Soules, who share advice on how to step into the role. Later that night, Ben greets twenty-six new bachelorettes at the mansion. Lauren B., a flight attendant, steps out on a limo and gives him a wing pin; Lauren R. stalks Ben on social media; Shushanna introduces herself to Ben in Russian; Leah catches a football; JoJo wears a unicorn head, which surprises Ben; Breanne presents a basket with bread; Mandi arrives with a huge "first impression rose" on her head; Izzy arrives wearing a onesie; Rachel rides in on a hoverboard; and Maegan brings her pet horse named Huey. Chris Harrison interrupts Ben's one-on-one time with the ladies as two former contestants, Amber and Becca, have come back to be part of the cast. Ben gives the first impression rose to Olivia. At the rose ceremony, Breanne, Izzy, Jessica, Laura, Lauren R., Maegan and Tiara are eliminated.
192	2	"Week 2"	January 11, 2016	2002	6.90	2.0/6
The first group date involves ten women participating in a "Bachelor High" competition at Verdugo Hills High School. The competition has five different challenges. Mandi is crowned "Homecoming Queen" after winning all of the challenges, but JoJo receives the group date rose. For his first one-on-one date of the season, Ben and Kevin Hart stop by the Mansion to pick up Caila. The trio travel around Los Angeles buying condoms and relaxing at a spa. Ben and Caila attend a concert with Amos Lee at the Regent theater and Ben gives her the date rose. The second group date involves Ben taking six women to a LoveLab facility at Azusa Pacific University for a scientific test using an electrocardiogram (ECG) sensor and electroencephalogram (EEG). Olivia receives the group date rose. At the rose ceremony, LB decides to leave, while Jackie, Mandi and Samantha are sent home.
193	3	"Week 3"	January 18, 2016	2003	7.56	2.2/6
Lauren B. gets the first one-on-one date for the week, which involves riding an airplane overlooking Southern California (including a view of the Mansion). Lauren B. receives a rose, and she and Ben end the night with a private stage by Lucy Angel. On the group date, twelve women go to Los Angeles Memorial Coliseum and meet Alex Morgan and Kelley O'Hara; they split into two teams--Stars and Stripes--and play soccer, with the winning team earning time with Ben at an after party and the losing team being sent home. Team Stripes wins and continues on to the after party, where Amber receives the group date rose. Jubilee gets the second one-on-one date, traveling to the Cal-A-Vie Health Spa Vista via helicopter with Ben. Over dinner, she shares her story, including how she was adopted. Ben gives Jubilee the rose. At the cocktail party, Ben tells the ladies he has received bad news from his family. Jubilee is very upset and Amber comforts her in the bathroom. Lace decided to leave the competition. At the rose ceremony, Jami and Shusanna are eliminated.
194	4	"Week 4: Las Vegas"	January 25, 2016	2004	7.73	2.3/7
The fourteen ladies travel to Las Vegas, Nevada. JoJo gets the first one-on-one, which involves being whisked away on a helicopter ride to the Las Vegas Strip and watching spectacular fireworks. At the end of the night, Ben gave the rose to her. On the group date, ten ladies go to The Mirage and participate in an annual talent show hosted by Terry Fator. Notable acts include twins Emily and Haley excelling with Irish dance moves and Olivia popping out of a cake in a showgirl costume; after her performance, Olivia becomes embarrassed and upset. Lauren B. receives the group date rose. Along with her invitation for the second one-on-one date, Becca receives a package that proves to contain a wedding dress. Confused, she visits the Little White Wedding Chapel with Ben and talks to actual married couples about marriage. She receives the rose. Ben brings Emily and Haley to their house, where they meet with the twins' mom to discuss opportunity issues. Ben decides to eliminate Haley at this time. At the rose ceremony, Amber and Rachel are eliminated.
195	5	"Week 5: Mexico City"	February 1, 2016	2005	7.50	2.3/7
The eleven remaining ladies travel to Mexico City, Mexico. Amanda gets the first one-on-one date; Ben comes to the hotel early in the morning to take her to the ancient city of Teotihuacan for a morning scenic view and a picnic. They conclude the evening in the Santa Fe district and Amanda gets the rose. Nine ladies (Emily, Becca, JoJo, Leah, Jen, Olivia, Jubilee, Lauren B., and Caila) take Spanish language lessons at a local school, learning vocabulary so they can buy items to prepare an assigned Mexican recipe. The women are divided into six teams of two, with Olivia paired up with Ben; the other women are dismayed that she gets more time with Ben. Jubilee and Lauren B.'s dish is praised by the local chefs. Lauren B. and Ben are serenaded through the city, while Jubilee is sent home. Ben gives the group date rose to Olivia. Lauren H. gets the second one-on-date and goes to Pineda Covalin headquarters to take part in Mercedes-Benz Fashion Week. She and Ben join the show alongside professional models, and Lauren H. receives the rose. At the cocktail party, Olivia calls Amanda a "Teen Mom", sparking outrage among the other women. As the rose ceremony is about to start, Ben asks to speak to Olivia in private. The episode ends in a cliffhanger.
196	6	"Week 6: The Bahamas"	February 8, 2016	2006	8.62	2.5/8
Beginning where the previous episode left off, Ben pulls Olivia aside to discuss the concerns other women in the house have raised to him; Olivia insists the women are overreacting and targeting her unfairly, and Ben believes her. They rejoin the others at the rose ceremony, where Jennifer is eliminated. The nine ladies travel to Exuma in The Bahamas. Caila gets the first one-on-one date for the week, which is her second one-on-one date this season; she and Ben take a deep sea fishing trip, and Ben gives her a rose. Six women (Lauren B., Leah, Amanda, Becca, JoJo, and Lauren H.) are selected for the group date, and Leah becomes very upset that she still has not received a one-on-one date while Caila has received two. They go to Pig Beach to swim with pigs, which none of the women enjoy. Throughout the date and the after party, the women voice their concerns to Ben that he seems to favor Lauren B. over them; Leah uses her time to talk about women in the house acting differently than they do around Ben, implying that Lauren B. is inauthentic around him. Amanda receives the group date rose. The next day, Leah visits Ben in his room to discuss their relationship and why she hasn't had a one-on-one date. Ben says their connection isn't strong enough and sends her home. Olivia and Emily are sent on a two-on-one date, traveling to an uninhabited private island. Ben has some one-on-one time with each of the ladies before giving the rose to Emily. Olivia is left behind on a wind-swept beach. At the rose ceremony, Lauren H. is sent home.
197	7	"Week 7: Warsaw, Indiana"	February 15, 2016	2007	7.24	2.2/6
The remaining six ladies travel to Ben's hometown of Warsaw, Indiana, where Ben meets his parents at the restaurant. Lauren B. gets the first one-on-one date; Ben takes her on a private tour of the whole town, then playing basketball with a youth league and Indiana Pacers players Paul George and George Hill at Baker Youth Club. Lauren B. receives the rose and is guaranteed a hometown date. For the second one-on-one date, Ben takes JoJo to Wrigley Field in Chicago to play baseball by themselves; she and Ben wear matching "Mrs. Higgins" and "Mr. Higgins" uniforms. Their night concludes with dinner on center field, where Ben gives JoJo the rose. Caila, Amanda, and Becca go to a farm for a group date. Ben gives the group date rose to Amanda; they continue the evening with dinner at McDonald's and going to a carnival. Emily goes to Ben's house to meet with Ben's parents. They express concerns about her immaturity, stating they believe she is not ready to become a wife. Ben eliminates Emily. At the rose ceremony at the Old Kosciusko County Courthouse, Becca is sent home.
198	8	"Week 8: Hometowns"	February 22, 2016	2008	8.67	2.5/8
Ben travels to the hometowns of the final four ladies. Amanda's hometown date begins in Laguna Beach in Orange County, California; she brings her two daughters with her to spend time with Ben at the beach. Ben had written a storybook for Amanda's daughters and reads it to them. Lauren's hometown takes place in Portland, Oregon, where they explore Pioneer Square and the city's famous food trucks; she and Ben eat a traditional Georgian khachapuri pie and end the night at Multnomah Whiskey Library. Caila's hometown date takes place in Hudson, Ohio. They take a tour of her former high school and visit the toy factory where her dad works. Caila's family surprises the couple with a traditional Philippine food dinner. JoJo's hometown date in Dallas, Texas is off to a rocky start, with her finding an envelope and roses from her ex-boyfriend on her doorstep. Ben meets her family, including her brother, Ready for Love star Ben Patton. JoJo's brothers are unimpressed by Ben and accuse him of brainwashing JoJo; she attempts to calm down her brothers and confides in them that she's falling in love with Ben. At the rose ceremony, Amanda is sent home.
199	9	"Week 9: Fantasy Suites"	February 29, 2016	2009	8.17	2.5/8
Ben and the final three ladies traveled to Ocho Rios in Jamaica for their overnight dates. Caila takes a ride on a wooden raft down the Martha Brae River, enjoys a riverside lunch of jerk chicken, and ends with a night of fireworks. Lauren B. travels to a preservation mission where they assist baby turtles. She tells Ben that she is in love with him, and he says he loves her too. They end the night watching reggae musicians on a bar stage. JoJo rides in a helicopter to a waterfall near Negril. She and Ben express that they are in love with one another, reflecting on the difficulties with her overprotective brothers during her hometown date. All three dates end in the Fantasy Suite. Caila goes to see Ben to share her feelings with him, proclaiming that she is in love with him; Ben admits that he is in love with his other two contestants and not with her, and he sends her home.
200	10	"The Women Tell All"	March 7, 2016	N/A	7.48	2.2/7
Seventeen of the twenty-six eliminated contestants attend the "Women Tell All" special, sitting in this particular order: Lace, Tiara, Amber, Jami, Izzy, Rachel, Jubilee, Shushanna, Jennifer, Lauren H., Leah, Olivia, Becca, Haley, Emily, Amanda and Caila. Several of the contestants talk about their lives after the show, notably Jubilee sharing that she has been promoted to Sergeant in the United States Army. Lace reveals a tattoo that a Bachelor fan has received in her honor, and Chris asks her to join the Bachelor in Paradise cast. Olivia recounts when she called Amanda a "Teen Mom" in the Bahamas and how she felt targeted throughout her time on the show. She gives Amanda a heartfelt apology. Caila explained her emotions when she told Ben she loved him and he didn't tell her he loved her back. Ben shows up to the ladies and finishes the show by stating that he is engaged to the winner and "would marry her tomorrow".
201	11	"Week 10: Season Finale"	March 14, 2016	2010	9.58	2.9/9
Both Lauren and JoJo meet Ben's parents (David and Amy) on a villa in Jamaica where they have spent time with Ben. Lauren's final date involves snuggling on a catamaran and a picnic on a beach. JoJo's final date involves swimming in the waterfalls. Ben reiterates that he has fallen in love with both Lauren and JoJo, and during their individual dates each woman sobs about the sacrifices they have made on the path to love. At the final rose ceremony, JoJo exits the first limo. She states how much she wants to be with him and how in love with him she is. Ben admits that he cannot propose to her, leaving her blindsided and heartbroken. Ben calls Lauren's dad to ask him for permission to propose to Lauren, and he gives Ben his blessing. Lauren arrives, they profess their love to each other and Ben kneels down on one knee and asks Lauren to marry him. She accepts and Ben asks, "Lauren, will you accept this rose?", with her answer being "Yes".
202	12	"After the Final Rose"	March 14, 2016	N/A	9.24	2.6/9
During The Women Tell All special, Ben stated that he would "marry (the winner) tomorrow", so Chris has arranged for both families and Ben's pastor to be on hand in case they actually want to get married on live TV. JoJo comes out first to see Ben for the first time since their breakup. Ben apologizes again for breaking her heart, saying he simply realized that he loved Lauren even more than he loved JoJo. Afterwards, Chris announces that JoJo will be the next Bachelorette. Then, Lauren comes out and she and Ben continue to profess their strong love for each other. They discuss her move from Southern California (Marina del Rey) to Denver, Colorado to be with Ben. In addition to Ben's pastor and their families, Jimmy Kimmel appears in the audience as well, making jokes about their overnight date from Week 9. They decide not to get married during the show, but Ben proposes to Lauren once again in front of the studio audience with their families present. They promise to marry soon.

== Post-show ==
On May 15, 2017, the couple announced their breakup.

Ben married Jessica Clarke on November 13, 2021.

Lauren married Chris Lane on October 25, 2019. Lauren and Chris have two children together, Dutton Walker (born June 8, 2021) and Baker Weston (born October 16, 2022).
