= The Bachelor (American TV series) season 19 =

Season of television series

The Bachelor
- Season 19
- Promotional poster
- Starring: Chris Soules
- Presented by: Chris Harrison
- No. of contestants: 30
- Winner: Whitney Bischoff
- Runner-up: Becca Tilley
- No. of episodes: 13 (including 3 specials)

Release
- Original network: ABC
- Original release: January 5 – March 9, 2015

Additional information
- Filming dates: September 25 – November 22, 2014

Season chronology
- ← Previous; Season 18 Next → Season 20

The nineteenth season of The Bachelor premiered on January 5, 2015. This season featured 33-year-old Chris Soules, a farmer from Arlington, Iowa.

Soules finished in third place on season 10 of The Bachelorette featuring Andi Dorfman. The season concluded on March 9, 2015, with Soules choosing to propose to 29-year-old fertility nurse Whitney Bischoff. They ended their engagement on May 28, 2015.

== Production ==
=== Casting and contestants ===
Casting began during the eighteenth season of The Bachelor. Soules and Arie Luyendyk Jr. were the candidates for the next bachelor. On August 26, 2014, Soules was chosen as a fan favorite and was first announced on Good Morning America. Luyendyk later became the star in the twenty-second season.

Notable contestants include Carly Waddell, who is the sister of The Bachelorette season 9 contestant Zak Waddell; professional wrestler Brittany Fetkin; former New York Jets cheerleader Nikki Delventhal; former Washington Redskins Cheerleader Jillian Anderson; and Samantha Steffen, who is the niece of Manoj Bhargava.

=== Filming and development ===
Unlike previous seasons, this season premiered with a three-hour live episode. Filming began at The Bachelor mansion in Agoura Hills, California on September 25, 2014. On mid-October, the show was filmed at Deadwood, South Dakota. The season included visits to San Francisco, Santa Fe, New Mexico, Des Moines, Iowa, and the Indonesian island of Bali. Jimmy Kimmel Live! host Jimmy Kimmel took over the hosting role for one episode alongside Chris Harrison and a performance from Big & Rich in week six.

== Contestants ==
The season began with 30 contestants.

Name	Age	Hometown	Occupation	Outcome	Place	Ref
Whitney Bischoff	29	Louisville, Kentucky	Fertility Nurse	Winner	1	
Becca Tilley	25	Shreveport, Louisiana	Chiropractic Assistant	Runner-up	2	
Kaitlyn Bristowe	29	Leduc, Alberta	Dance Instructor	Week 9	3	
Jade Roper	28	Gering, Nebraska	Cosmetics Developer	Week 8	4	
Carly Waddell	29	Arlington, Texas	Cruise Ship Singer	Week 7	5	
Britt Nilsson	27	Wolcott Mills, Michigan	Waitress	Week 7	6	
Megan Bell	24	Brentwood, Tennessee	Make-Up Artist	Week 6	7 (quit)	
Kelsey Poe	28	Hudsonville, Michigan	Guidance Counselor	Week 6	8	
Ashley Iaconetti	26	Great Falls, Virginia	Journalist	Week 6	9	
Mackenzie Deonigi	21	Maple Valley, Washington	Dental Assistant	Week 5	10–11	
Samantha Steffen	27	Indianapolis, Indiana	Fashion Designer	Week 5	10–11	
Ashley Salter	24	Vinings, Georgia	Hair Stylist	Week 4	12–14	
Juelia Kinney	30	Beaverton, Oregon	Esthetician	Week 4	12–14	
Nikki Delventhal	26	Hasbrouck Heights, New Jersey	Former NFL Cheerleader	Week 4	12–14	
Jillian Anderson	25	Howland, Ohio	News Producer	Week 4	15	
Amber James	29	Kankakee, Illinois	Bartender	Week 3	16–18	
Tracy Darakis	29	Wellington, Florida	Fourth Grade Teacher	Week 3	16–18	
Trina Scherenberg	33	Algonquin, Illinois	Special Education Teacher	Week 3	16–18	
Alissa Giambrone	24	Hamilton, New Jersey	Flight Attendant	Week 2	19–23	
Jordan Branch	24	Windsor, Colorado	Student	Week 2	19–23	
Kimberly Sherbach	28	Wantagh, New York	Yoga Instructor	Week 2	19–23	
Tandra Steiner	30	Sandy, Utah	Executive Assistant	Week 2	19–23	
Tara Eddings	26	Fort Lauderdale, Florida	Sport Fishing Enthusiast	Week 2	19–23	
Amanda Goerlitz	24	Lake in the Hills, Illinois	Ballet Teacher	Week 1	24–30	
Bo Stanley	25	Carpinteria, California	Plus-Size Model	Week 1	24–30	
Brittany Fetkin	26	Temecula, California	WWE Diva-in-Training	Week 1	24–30	
Kara Wilson	25	Brownsville, Kentucky	High School Soccer Coach	Week 1	24–30	
Michelle Davis	25	Provo, Utah	Wedding Cake Baker	Week 1	24–30	
Nicole Meacham	31	Scottsdale, Arizona	Real Estate Agent	Week 1	24–30	
Reegan Cornwell	28	Manhattan Beach, California	Cadaver Tissue Saleswoman	Week 1	24–30	

=== Future appearances ===
==== The Bachelorette ====
Britt Nilsson and Kaitlyn Bristowe were chosen as co-leads for season 11 of The Bachelorette; however, only one would survive past the first night. The men voted for Kaitlyn to continue as the Bachelorette. Kaitlyn was named as the interim host for The Bachelorette during seasons 17 and 18 alongside Tayshia Adams, replacing Chris Harrison.

==== The Bachelor ====
Amber James and Becca Tilley returned for season 20 of The Bachelor. Amber was eliminated in week 4 and Becca in week 7.

==== Bachelor in Paradise ====
Season 2

Ashley Salter, Ashley Iaconetti, Carly Waddell, Jade Roper, Jillian Anderson, Juelia Kinney, Megan Bell, Amber, Samantha Steffen, and Mackenzie Deonigi returned for the second season of Bachelor in Paradise. Jillian was eliminated in week 1, Megan in week 3, and Ashley S. and Amber in week 5. Juelia was also eliminated in week 3 but returned in week 4. Juelia, Ashley I., and Mackenzie quit in week 5. Carly split from Kirk DeWindt, in week 6. Jade ended the season engaged to Tanner Tolbert. They were married on January 24, 2016 and have three children together. Samantha left paradise in a relationship with Nick Peterson.

Season 3

Carly and Ashley I. returned for the third season of Bachelor in Paradise. Ashley I. was eliminated in week 3 but returned in week 4. She split from Wells Adams in week 6. Carly ended the season engaged to Evan Bass. They were married on June 17, 2017 and had two children. They separated in December 2020.

==== The Bachelor Winter Games ====
Ashley I. returned for The Bachelor Winter Games under Team USA. She co-won the season alongside Canadian Bachelorette alum, Kevin Wendt.

==== Dancing with the Stars ====
Chris Soules competed in season 20 of Dancing with the Stars, partnering with Witney Carson. He finished in 5th place.

Kaitlyn competed in season 29 of that show, with partner Artem Chigvintsev, and won.

== Call-out order ==
Order	Bachelorettes	Week									
Order	Bachelorettes	1	2	3	4	5	6 (Note: In week 6, Megan decided to quit the competition, cancelling the upcoming rose ceremony.)	7	8	9	10
1	Britt	Britt	Mackenzie	Kaitlyn	Kaitlyn	Carly	Becca	Kaitlyn	Whitney	Whitney	Whitney
2	Whitney	Kaitlyn	Megan	Becca	Jade	Whitney	Britt	Whitney	Kaitlyn	Becca	Becca
3	Kelsey	Jade	Kaitlyn	Whitney	Whitney	Britt	Carly; Jade; Kaitlyn; Whitney	Becca	Becca	Kaitlyn	
4	Megan	Samantha	Britt	Jade	Carly	Jade	Carly; Jade; Kaitlyn; Whitney	Jade	Jade		
5	Ashley I.	Ashley I.	Ashley I.	Samantha	Megan	Kaitlyn	Carly; Jade; Kaitlyn; Whitney	Carly			
6	Trina	Tandra	Trina	Juelia	Samantha	Megan	Carly; Jade; Kaitlyn; Whitney	Britt			
7	Reegan	Nikki	Kelsey	Mackenzie	Mackenzie	Becca	Megan				
8	Tara	Kelsey	Samantha	Kelsey	Kelsey	Ashley I.	Kelsey				
9	Amber	Megan	Juelia	Britt	Becca	Kelsey	Ashley I.				
10	Nikki	Alissa	Amber	Megan	Ashley I.	Mackenzie; Samantha					
11	Amanda	Amber	Tracy	Carly	Britt	Mackenzie; Samantha					
12	Jillian	Juelia	Jillian	Ashley S.	Ashley S. Juelia; Nikki	Jordan					
13	Mackenzie	Becca	Jade	Nikki	Ashley S. Juelia; Nikki						
14	Ashley S.	Trina	Nikki	Jillian	Ashley S. Juelia; Nikki						
15	Kaitlyn	Mackenzie	Becca	Ashley I.	Jillian						
16	Samantha	Tracy	Carly	Amber; Tracy; Trina							
17	Michelle	Tara	Whitney	Amber; Tracy; Trina							
18	Juelia	Jordan	Ashley S.	Amber; Tracy; Trina							
19	Becca	Jillian	Alissa; Jordan; Kimberly; Tandra; Tara								
20	Tandra	Whitney	Alissa; Jordan; Kimberly; Tandra; Tara								
21	Alissa	Carly	Alissa; Jordan; Kimberly; Tandra; Tara								
22	Jordan	Ashley S.	Alissa; Jordan; Kimberly; Tandra; Tara								
23	Nicole	Kimberly	Alissa; Jordan; Kimberly; Tandra; Tara								
24	Brittany	Amanda; Bo; Brittany; Kara; Michelle; Nicole; Reegan									
25	Carly	Amanda; Bo; Brittany; Kara; Michelle; Nicole; Reegan									
26	Tracy	Amanda; Bo; Brittany; Kara; Michelle; Nicole; Reegan									
27	Bo	Amanda; Bo; Brittany; Kara; Michelle; Nicole; Reegan									
28	Kimberly	Amanda; Bo; Brittany; Kara; Michelle; Nicole; Reegan									
29	Kara	Amanda; Bo; Brittany; Kara; Michelle; Nicole; Reegan									
30	Jade	Amanda; Bo; Brittany; Kara; Michelle; Nicole; Reegan									

The contestant received the first impression rose
The contestant received a rose during the date
The contestant was eliminated
The contestant was originally eliminated but was saved
The contestant was eliminated during the date
The contestant quit the competition
The contestant was eliminated outside of the rose ceremony
The previously eliminated contestant asked for a chance to return, but was denied
The contestant moved on to the next week by default
The contestant won the competition

== Episodes ==
No. overall	No. in season	Title	Original release date	Prod. code	U.S. viewers (millions)	Rating/share (18–49)
178	1	"Week 1: Season Premiere"	January 5, 2015	1901	7.76	2.2/7
The first hour of the episode consists of a live red-carpet event in Los Angeles hosted by Chris Harrison and attended by fans of the show as well as former The Bachelor and The Bachelorette contestants. Chris interviews seven former contestants: Sean and Catherine Lowe, Marcus Grodd and Lacy Faddoul, Andi Dorfman and Josh Murray, and Nikki Ferrell. Notable arrivals in the mansion are Reegan, a cadaver tissue saleswoman (known as "Donated Tissue Specialist" in the show credits), who brings a (fake) human heart. Tara comes in shorts, flannel, and cowboy boots, then changes into a dress. Amber presents a teddy bear, and Nikki tells Chris that she arrived at the mansion straight from her trip in Peru, when Tara comes back into the limo to reintroduce herself to Chris. Amanda calls the limo driver to give an envelope to Chris and does not give her name; she makes Chris close his eyes and tells him she is his secret admirer, echoing how Chris introduced himself during Andi Dorfman's season. Chris spends time with the initial 15 women, leading them to believe that there would be only 15 contestants, Harrison called Chris out before the second batch of women arrived. Nicole wears a pig nose. Tandra rides a motorcycle. Alissa, a flight attendant, performs a seat belt demonstration. Jordan appears with a little bottle of whiskey and has a toast with Chris. Brittany wears a white lace dress and shows #Soulesmates on the placard. Carly, a cruise ship singer, sings a song with a portable karaoke machine. Tracy, a teacher, brings a note from her students. In total, 30 women are introduced, rather than the traditional 25. During the cocktail party, Kaitlyn, the dance instructor, teaches Chris a dance move. Ashley S., wishing to illustrate a point with an onion, eventually finds a pomegranate. Britt receives the first impression rose. Rose Ceremony: Tara, having had too much to drink, becomes wobbly at the ceremony. Chris takes notice but ultimately decides to give her a second chance. Nicole, Amanda, Brittany, Kara, Bo, Reegan, Michelle and Kimberly were all sent home, and a somber Kimberly returns to the house and asks for Chris, ending the episode.
179	2	"Week 2"	January 12, 2015	1902	6.48	1.8/5
Kimberly convinces Chris to give her another chance. First Group Date: "Show me your country..." Jade, Tandra, Ashley I., Mackenzie, Kimberly, and Tara. The girls and Chris have a pool party. During this time, Megan and Jillian sneak off to Chris's house. Megan wears his motorcycle helmet and rams her head into several objects before determining that it is safe. Later, the group walks down the streets of Los Angeles in their bathing suits. They find a line of tractors and Chris tells the girls that they are going to race. The tractors take off slowly, but Ashley I. eventually wins the race, winning some alone time with Chris as well. Halfway through the date, Chris announces to the girls that the date will continue as a one-on-one. He invites Mackenzie to come with him while the other five go home. While the date starts off a little strangely, it ends well with Chris giving her the rose. The rest of the women are back at the house where they bond and wait for the next date card. Juelia tells the women that she has a daughter and was married, but her husband died. One-on-one: "Love is a natural wonder..." Megan. The two fly to Las Vegas, Nevada and get into a helicopter. They fly over the Grand Canyon, land, and have a picnic on the Colorado River. They have a heart-to-heart and Megan tells Chris about her father who had recently had a heart attack that caused him to go brain dead. Chris tells her that she has affected him ever since the first night. He gives her the rose. Second Group Date: "Til death do us part..." Kelsey, Trina, Alissa, Tracy, Jillian, Becca, Amber, Ashley S., Juelia, Kaitlyn, and Britt. The limo drives up to a creepy-looking area in the middle of nowhere. It appears that the girls are at a haunted house as they are attacked by "zombies" at their limo. When Chris opens the door, the girls scream even louder. When they get out, Chris explains that the group is splitting up into three teams and killing zombies with paintballs. At the dinner afterwards, the group talk about Ashley S.; they are concerned by how strange she is. During their alone time, it is evident that Chris feels the same way. During his alone time with Britt, Chris gives her a card that says "Free kiss from Chris" to show her that he was thinking about her. Kaitlyn receives the rose. Back at the house, Jordan, who is jealous she did not get a date, gets drunk and shows up twerking upside down with the other women at the bathroom wearing face masks. Besides Jordan, Carly, Whitney, Nikki, and Samantha are the other four who were not given a date this week either. Cocktail Party: Whitney gives Chris a bottle of his favorite whiskey with high hopes that she will be back on his radar. They share a toast by the fireplace. Ashley I. admits to some of the other girls that she is a virgin, something that she is not ready to tell Chris quite yet. Jordan has had too many drinks and is drunk when she talks to Chris; he is visibly uncomfortable. At the rose ceremony, Britt receives the rose, and Ashley S. goes last once again, Alissa, Jordan, Tandra and Tara are eliminated, along with Kimberly, who feels emotional on being sent home once again.
180	3	"Week 3"	January 19, 2015	1903	7.61	2.1/6
The episode starts with Jimmy Kimmel surprising Chris and the women. He presents the first date card to the group, telling them that he will be planning the dates for the week. Chris is also in the dark for what the dates will entail. First One-on-one Date: Kaitlyn. Jimmy sends them to Costco to pick up some groceries for him, including several cases of ketchup, chairs, tables, and paper towels. They go back to Chris's house and they cook dinner together. While they are sitting on a couch in the back, kissing, Jimmy shows up. The three have dinner together in Chris's backyard. Kaitlyn receives the rose. Group Date: Britt, Jillian, Becca, Tracey, Mackenzie, Kelsey, Amber, Ashley S., Juelia, Samantha, Nikki, and Carly. Jimmy takes them to visit some "real party animals". There is a relay activity involving different animals, which includes filling a wheelbarrow with manure, drinking goat milk, and wrestling a greased pig. Despite being lactose intolerant, Carly wins the relay. After, Jimmy takes a picture of Carly and Chris dressed up like the couple in the painting, American Gothic. At the dinner afterwards, Carly, steals Chris away for the first alone time. Becca receives the rose. Second One-on-one Date: Whitney. They go and have a picnic where they see a wedding taking place below. Whitney suggests that they crash the wedding, so they go back and change into nicer clothes and then crash the wedding. Their story, just in case anyone recognized Chris, is that the two of them became engaged on The Bachelor. Chris is nervous about pretending to belong at the wedding, but he is blown away by Whitney's ability to make up a story to make it seem like they knew the bride and groom. Whitney receives the rose. The women who did not get a date this week are Ashley I., Jade, Megan, and Trina. In place of a cocktail party, the group has a pool party. There, Juelia opens up to Chris about her late husband's suicide. Jade, concerned that she hasn't gotten much alone time with Chris, asks him to give her a tour of his house. During this time, Jillian decides to go to his house, get into his hot tub, and wait for him. When other women try to talk to Chris, Jillian continues to monopolize his time. Eventually, he takes Ashley I. aside to talk to her privately because of how upset she seemed with Jillian. They kiss on the roof. While everyone is sitting together by the pool, Chris Harrison comes in and tells them that it is time for the rose ceremony. Chris goes off to prepare. Rose Ceremony: Jade is surprised to receive a rose; Amber, Tracy and Trina were all sent home.
181	4	"Week 4"	January 26, 2015	1904	7.95	2.3/6
The episode begins with Chris Harrison entering the mansion, making some intentions with Chris and holds the date card for the upcoming date. First Group Date: Megan, Kaitlyn, Ashley I., Ashley S., Juelia, Samantha, Mackenzie and Kelsey. The Date Card says, "Do What Feels Natural..." They meet with Chris, who takes them to Lake Piru for a camping trip that includes a fun day swimming and playing games at the lake. Ashley I. and Kaitlyn take off their bikini top and bottoms, respectively, when they jump in the lake. This disgusts Kelsey, who calls this indecent behavior for a group date. Kelsey is also overall uninterested in camping at the lake and pouts for most of the date. At night, the women comment on Ashley S.'s continuing strange behavior, comparing her stares and tone of voice to that of someone in a horror movie. As everyone settles in for bed, Ashley I. goes to Chris's tent and admits to him that she has never had a boyfriend before, unsuccessfully hinting that she is a virgin. Kaitlyn receives the rose. Meanwhile, the rest of the women are back at the house, awaiting an invitation for the one-on-one date, which will be chosen by Chris's three sisters after a personal interview with each contestant. After talking with everyone, Chris's sisters chose Jade for a masquerade ball-themed date taking place the following evening from 8 pm to 12 am. One-on-one Date: Jade. After Jade received the envelope from Chris's sisters, a makeup crew surprises her at the house, personally styling her with fashionable hair, makeup, and a ballgown inspired by the movie Cinderella and, like titular character, escort her to a grand ball. There, Jade and Chris talk over dinner and wine, and they connect over shared experiences – they both have been previously engaged. Jade receives the rose, and she and Chris end the night by dancing in a ballroom surrounding by a professional orchestra. Meanwhile at the house, Ashley I. expresses her frustration over not being chosen for this specific one-on-one date because she wants to dress up like a princess and have a formal date with Chris. She dresses up in the formal gown that she brought purposefully for a princess-themed date and drinks wine. Second Group Date: Nikki, Jillian, Whitney, Carly, Britt, Becca. The women on this group date each receive a package containing a wedding dress that will not be going for a walk down the aisle. The women board a private plane and fly to San Francisco where they are taken to a MuckFest MS obstacle course location. There, they have to race each other through a wet, muddy course while wearing the wedding dresses. Whoever wins goes on a one-on-one date with Chris in San Francisco for the rest of the night. Jillian easily wins, sending the other women back to the house. During Chris and Jillian's dinner date at Fairmont San Francisco Jillian spends most of the time talking about herself. The date is cut short when Chris makes the decision to send Jillian home, stating that they lacked a romantic connection during one-on-one time. Cocktail Party: Ashley I., not confident that Chris understood her hint during first group date, goes to him directly to say that she is a virgin. Afterward, she regrets telling him, feeling like he was "freaked out" by her confession. Ashley I. then informs all of the other women that she is a virgin and learns that Becca has not had sex either. At the Rose Ceremony, Chris tells the ladies that he made difficult and tough decisions tonight. Whitney's name is called first, and Britt is named last. Ashley S., Juelia and Nikki are sent home. Chris accompanies Juelia out and tells her how proud he is for her journey in the competition and encourages her, saying she is making her daughter proud.
182	5	"Week 5: Santa Fe, New Mexico"	February 2, 2015	1905	8.45	2.5/7
First one-on-one date: Carly. Chris takes Carly to a house where they find a "Love and Intimacy Mentor" meditating in the backyard. Chris says that his relationship with Carly is more like a friendship and if she cannot bring out the romance, the relationship is over. Various aspects of the date make both of them feel uncomfortable. However, in the end, they both feel more connected to each other and bond. They go to dinner later and open up to each other. Group Date: Jade, Meghan, Kaitlyn, Whitney, Mackenzie, Becca, Samantha, Ashley I., Kelsey. Chris takes the group of women white-water rafting in Rio Grande. Jade falls into the water, and because of a condition that causes her to have hypothermia at regular temperatures, Chris rubs her feet warm, causing much jealousy among the other girls. At the hotel where the afterparty takes place, Jordan, who was let go two weeks prior, shows up, asking Chris for some alone time to talk and get to know her. He brings her back to the afterparty, much to the rest of the group's dismay. Ultimately, Chris sends Jordan back home and gives the rose to Whitney. Second one-on-one: Britt. Chris goes into Britt's room at 4:30 in the morning. He takes Britt, who has acrophobia, on a hot air balloon ride. After, they go back to his hotel room, where he gives her the rose. They start kissing in Chris's bed before he closes the doors on the cameras. Before the cocktail party and rose ceremony, Kelsey goes to Chris's hotel room and tells him the story of how she was widowed. Cocktail party: The girls, even those with roses, are all worried, except for Kelsey, who is overly confident, despite her lack of rose. Chris comes in to talk to the women and tells them that it has been a particularly tough week before excusing himself. He reveals that Kelsey came to talk to him, which becomes an awkward moment with the rest of the group. Kelsey states that Chris has his mind already made up, although everyone else is skeptical. After a while, Chris Harrison comes back and announces that Chris knows what he is going to do and they will be skipping the cocktail party. All of a sudden, Kelsey leaves the room and collapses on the floor in a panic attack. The episode ends with a cliffhanger regarding the fate of the rose ceremony.
183	6	"Week 6: Deadwood, South Dakota"	February 9, 2015	1906	8.70	2.7/8
Kelsey recovers from her panic attack and goes to talk to Chris. The other ladies are convinced that Kelsey faked the panic attack to manipulate Chris and are united in their dislike for her. The rose ceremony resumes with Kelsey receiving the last rose, while Mackenzie and Samantha are eliminated. The remaining ladies find out that they are heading to Deadwood, South Dakota. One-on-one Date: Becca. Chris and Becca go horseback riding and have a cookout in the woods. During the closing credits it is revealed that they also did some shooting. Chris is very impressed with Becca. Becca is nervous about the possibility of a first kiss, particularly if her father is watching. Chris and Becca do indeed kiss and Chris gives Becca the rose. Group Date: Meghan, Carly, Britt, Whitney, Jade, and Kaitlyn. The ladies meet country duo Big & Rich and must write love songs to sing to Chris. After the singing, Chris tells Britt he has a surprise and takes her from the group date to the Big & Rich concert where he takes Britt on stage and gives her a rose. An hour later, they return to the group date where the girls are upset that Chris and Britt were away together. Two-on-one Date: Kelsey and Ashley I. Tensions are running high between the two girls; both are convinced they will get the rose and both are upset with the antics of the other. Chris takes Ashley I. away in the beginning and asks her what it is like in the house. Ashley I. admits that Kelsey does not get along with the other girls and that they feel she is fake. Chris then tells Kelsey what Ashley I. said about her, sparking a fight between the two girls. Ashley I. pulls Chris away, is upset and begins to cry. Chris says that he does not see her fitting into his world and does not see them together, so he sends her home. Chris then tells Kelsey that he sent Ashley I. home, which means that Kelsey would normally stay. However, he then tells Kelsey that he does not see a future with her either and does not want to keep her here longer if he does not see her as his wife. Back at the hotel, the ladies are shocked to see Ashley's suitcase being taken away, but later celebrate when they see Kelsey's suitcase taken away as well.
184	7	"Chris Tells All"	February 15, 2015	N/A	5.67	1.5/4
185	8	"Week 7: Iowa"	February 15, 2015	1907	6.05	1.5/4
Prior to the Rose Ceremony, Megan confronts Chris about the fact that their relationship is not moving forward. Chris agrees with her assessment and indicates that this is not likely to change, so Megan decides to leave. Chris Harrison then announces that only one woman will be eliminated at the Rose Ceremony. However, Chris declares that he has strong feelings for all six and decides not to eliminate any of them. He invites them all to come to his home state of Des Moines. First One-on-one Date: Jade and Chris travel to Chris's hometown of Arlington and visit his house, farm and various landmarks around the town. Chris notes the fact that most of the businesses in Arlington have closed, and there are no real bars or restaurants in town, but it is home to him. They attend a high school football game at Starmont High School (his alma mater) and meet his parents. Second One-on-one Date: Whitney and Chris go to Des Moines. They visit a museum and are given a camera to record images of loving moments taken around town. They select one image as the best. Later they visit a restaurant and talk with some of Chris's friends. At the end of the evening a wall mural based on their photo is unveiled near the restaurant. After hearing Jade's description of Arlington, Carly, Kaitlyn, Becca and Britt decide to take a road trip and see it for themselves. They get the impression that it is very small and all the buildings seem to be locked. They ask a local where the nearest restaurant is and he says it is an hour away in Cedar Rapids. After returning, Britt remarks to the others that she could never live in such a place. However, later she tells Chris that she had a wonderful time in Arlington. Just before the start of the group date, Jade finally confesses to Carly that she posed nude for Playboy. Carly is stunned but supportive, and encourages Jade to tell Chris. Group Date: Carly, Kaitlyn and Britt join Chris to play ice hockey at Wells Fargo Arena. Carly privately tells Chris that Britt said she could not live in Arlington and that he should be careful. Chris gives Britt another chance to change her story; Britt admits that she did not like Arlington at first, but that she thinks she could make it work. Kaitlyn tells Chris she is feeling insecure about their relationship; Chris reassures her by giving her the group date rose. Britt pouts about not getting the rose and tells Chris that she is not sure whether she wants to take Chris to meet her family. Chris feels manipulated and ends the date. Carly gloats to the others about Britt's meltdown.
186	9	"Week 8: Hometowns"	February 16, 2015	1908	8.97	2.6/7
Week 7 One-on-one Date: Becca visited the loft apartment where Chris was staying while in Des Moines and they had a chance to relax and talk. She tells him that she has never brought anyone home to meet her parents. Back at the house, Britt tells the others that she feels she needs to leave, but they are skeptical that she will actually go through with it. Britt resolves to tell Chris during the Cocktail Party that she is leaving. However, Chris Harrison announces that Chris has decided not to have the Cocktail Party because his mind is made up. Jade is also disappointed that she will not be able to share her secret with Chris. Week 7 Rose Ceremony: Before Chris can hand out the first rose, Britt asks to speak with him privately. During the discussion Chris points out that there have been several instances where she seems to have been lying to him, which has led him to decide that he cannot continue a relationship with her. She sits outside and sobs and the others feel that she is finally getting a taste of the real world. Back at the ceremony, Chris says that he appreciates their feedback and if they will be honest with him, he will be honest with them. Carly does not get a rose and is eliminated. Chris and the final four move on to the hometown dates. Becca: Her hometown date begins in Shreveport, Louisiana. Her family tells Chris that she had never been in a serious relationship before, and that they are surprised by how close they seem to be. Becca's sister tells Becca that she is worried how Chris will react to her virginity if they reach the fantasy suite. Chris worries about whether Becca is capable of being close with anyone, but decides that it worth it to be the one that she is waiting for. The evening ends on a high note, as Chris takes Becca for a ride on the ferris wheel at the Louisiana State Fair. Whitney: Next is Whitney's date in Chicago, Illinois. First she shows him the fertility clinic where she works; they then have dinner with her family in her apartment. Whitney's sister is a bit skeptical of the process and Whitney asks her not to ruin it for her. Chris asks her sister for her blessing to propose to Whitney and she says she will withhold her blessing until Whitney is the only one remaining. At the end of the evening Whitney opens and shares an expensive bottle of wine with Chris to celebrate the occasion. Kaitlyn: Kaitlyn's date takes place in Phoenix, Arizona instead of her native Canada, since that is where her parents spend the winter. She and Chris go to a record studio and produce a rap song about their experiences so far. Then they go to her house and meet with her parents, her step-parents, and her sister. Her mother tells Chris that Kaitlyn may be protecting her heart because she had a previous relationship that ended badly. Afterwards, Kaitlyn takes Chris out and shows him a huge "Kaitlyn [hearts] Chris" billboard which she had arranged. Jade: Last, Jade's hometown date is in Gering, Nebraska. She meets Chris at her house and introduces her father, her father's fiance, her brothers and her mother. Jade's father and brother both tell Chris that Jade has a history, although give few details. Her father warns him that her previous boyfriends found her too much to handle and her brother says she is a free spirit and a wild mustang, but she might be able to settle down. Chris is puzzled because he has never seen this side of her. Later that evening, they go to the motel where Chris is staying and Jade finally gets a chance to share her secret. She shows her Playboy photos and video to Chris, who is initially shocked but decides that he will not judge her for her past and that this will not affect their relationship. Rose Ceremony: The Rose Ceremony takes place in Dubuque, Iowa. Chris is not thrilled with having to make a very hard decision about whom to send home. He gives the roses to Whitney, Kaitlyn and Becca, sending Jade home. Chris reassures Jade that her revelation did not play a role in his decision. Chris sits on the curb and cries as Jade's limo drives away.
187	10	"Week 9: Fantasy Suites"	February 23, 2015	1909	8.97	2.6/7
Chris and the final three ladies travel to the island of Bali in Indonesia. Kaitlyn: Kaitlyn and Chris wander through Bali, meeting people on the street and talking with them. They have an encounter in a park with monkeys, who climb on their backs when they hold up bananas. Later, they decide to go to the fantasy suite, where Kaitlyn opens up about her feelings and he says he is starting to fall in love with her, too. Whitney: Chris and Whitney take a boat ride over the ocean. Whitney is worried that her sister's refusal to give Chris her blessing will ruin her chances with him, so Chris reassures Whitney that her sister's disapproval does not change how he feels about her. They jump in the ocean together and lounge on the deck until sundown. Later, Chris and Whitney discuss Arlington, Iowa. Whitney says she is not happy not being a wife and mother, so she would be willing to leave her career to be with him in Arlington without regret. They both decide to go to the fantasy suite. Becca: Chris and Becca visit a Bali village, drinking from fruit and walking through forests. They interact with the kids in the village and visit a temple. At the temple, they ask questions about their relationship and future. They talk near a river and then kiss in it. Becca tells him she thinks she is falling in love with him and he tells her he is, too. When they pull out the fantasy suite card they decide to go to the fantasy suite together. While in the fantasy suite, Becca confesses to Chris that she is a virgin. Chris is flustered but says he respects her for it. After the fantasy suite: Chris says he woke up after the fantasy suite with Becca and they had a very serious conversation that worried him about their future. He says she is not completely confident about her feelings and a future in Iowa. He tears up when thinking about everything, and what he is going to do because his decision is not clear and he is going to have to send someone home that he is falling in love with. Chris talks with Chris Harrison about his struggling choice. Rose Ceremony: Before the Rose Ceremony starts, Chris pulls Becca aside to talk. She tells him she has strong feelings for him and he struggles with his emotions as he tries to describe how he feels about her. Meanwhile, Kaitlyn and Whitney discuss how they think Becca is going home and Kaitlyn is happy about the thought. When Chris returns with Becca the other girls are shocked and worried. Chris calls out Whitney first, then Becca, and he walks Kaitlyn out, holding her hand. He tells her he cannot explain why he is sending her home and he really cares about her and it was not an easy decision for him. In the car, Kaitlyn is confused about her feelings and upset that she let her guard down. She is also very upset with Chris for not telling her why she is being eliminated.
188	11	"The Women Tell All"	March 2, 2015	N/A	8.15	2.4/7
Seventeen of the twenty-eight eliminated contestants sat down for the show in particular order: Nikki, Trina, Juelia, Tara, Amber, Megan, Samantha, Jordan, Ashley S., Jillian, Kelsey, Britt, Mackenzie, Ashley I., Jade, Carly and Kaitlyn. Some of the eliminated contestants take turns in the hot seat. Highlights include Britt confronting Carly causing an argument led by the other women. Kelsey confronts Ashley I. on a controversial two-on-one date; she also reflects on her late husband's death. Chris Harrison extends an invitation to Ashley S. and brings a souvenir of a pomegranate which she found in the first week to him. Later Harrison suggests she appear in the next season of Bachelor in Paradise. Then, Jade confronts Chris Harrison and discusses her experience on the date recalling the Playboy nude photo. Later Chris takes the hot seat and finds closure with several of the women. He also apologizes to Kaitlyn for making her appear in the Rose Ceremony rather than letting her leave gracefully. The bloopers include red underwear being found in the production room, some of the contestants being frightened by insects and animals during confessional interviews, and Chris Harrison helping Jimmy Kimmel to prepare for the rose ceremony during week 3.
189	12	"Week 10: Season Finale"	March 9, 2015	1910	9.68	2.7/8
Chris returns home to Arlington, Iowa and has a chance to bring Whitney and Becca to his family. He spends his time at his parents' house with his family including his nieces and nephews. Whitney arrives first and is greeted by Chris's father Gary. Chris's sisters talk to her, saying that moving to Arlington would be difficult for her if she is ready to be a wife. She explains to Chris's mom Linda why she does not have any parents; her mom died and she has no contact with her dad. Her dream is to start a family with Chris. Just after the meeting with Whitney, Chris has a pep talk with his dad and brothers-in-law. Becca is next to meet Chris's family and makes a big impression. In her eyes, the visit was awful. They ask her about Arlington; it was not actually the first time she visited since she was on the road trip with three other women back in Week 7. Then, Linda asks whether she will commit to Chris in two days, waiting for a decision to be part of the family and not recognizing that Becca is not ready to fall in love. On the final dates, Chris comes to Becca's hotel room. Becca finds it difficult to adapt to small-town life and does not want to move to Iowa. Whitney stops by Chris's family farm in Arlington and rides a tractor with his dad, harvesting corn. Then, Chris and Whitney travel to the middle of nowhere. Chris takes her a tour of the 800-acre (3,200,000 m^{2}) farm; they arrive at his house. Later at the hotel, they have a cocktail toast showing their photo from the one-on-one date in Week 3. Whitney loves small-town life. Neil Lane arrives at the hotel and asks Chris to choose an engagement ring. Chris describes raising a pig as a child. Becca arrives at the barn first. Chris tells her that she is not ready to become a wife; she leaves in tears. Whitney comes next wearing high heels and a black dress. Chris Harrison wishes her good luck. He then gets down on one knee and says, "everything about this moment feels right and I want the world to know that I love you, Whitney Bischoff. Will you marry me?".
190	13	"After the Final Rose"	March 9, 2015	N/A	9.68	2.8/8
There is a live finale viewing party and then the "After the Final Rose" follows. Chris Harrison begins the show by hyping up a surprise that Chris has in store for all of the viewers, including himself. Chris Harrison puts Becca in the hot seat first. He asks her questions about the final rose ceremony and how she is doing now. She has a chance to talk Chris again. Next, Whitney is in the hot seat and talks about her relationship with Chris. She tells Harrison that the couple has had a strong romantic bond since their engagement, and she and Chris have made public appearances together for the first time, meaning they are happier. Then, Whitney talks about Arlington and knows the distance is not quite far from Chicago. There is a video clip showing what happens after the proposal. Chris's parents came to the barn with a big congratulations for the newly-engaged couple. Ashley S., who was eliminated in week 4, was asked by Harrison to appear for the second season of Bachelor in Paradise. She did not give a complete answer. Harrison continues talking with Whitney and asks about Iowa and being a part of Chris's family. Afterwards, Jimmy Kimmel arrives at the studio and surprises them with a cow named Juan Pablo. At the end of the show, Harrison announces that there will be two bachelorettes on the next season of The Bachelorette. Kaitlyn and Britt will both appear in the first episode, where the 25 men will decide who they want to be the bachelorette.
