= Devin Taylor =

Devin Taylor may refer to:

- Devin Taylor (American football) (born 1989), American football defensive end
- Devin Taylor (baseball) (born 2004), American baseball player
- Devin Taylor (wrestler) (born 1988), American model, actress, television personality, and professional wrestler
