= Jordan Rodgers =

American football player and sports commentator (born 1988)

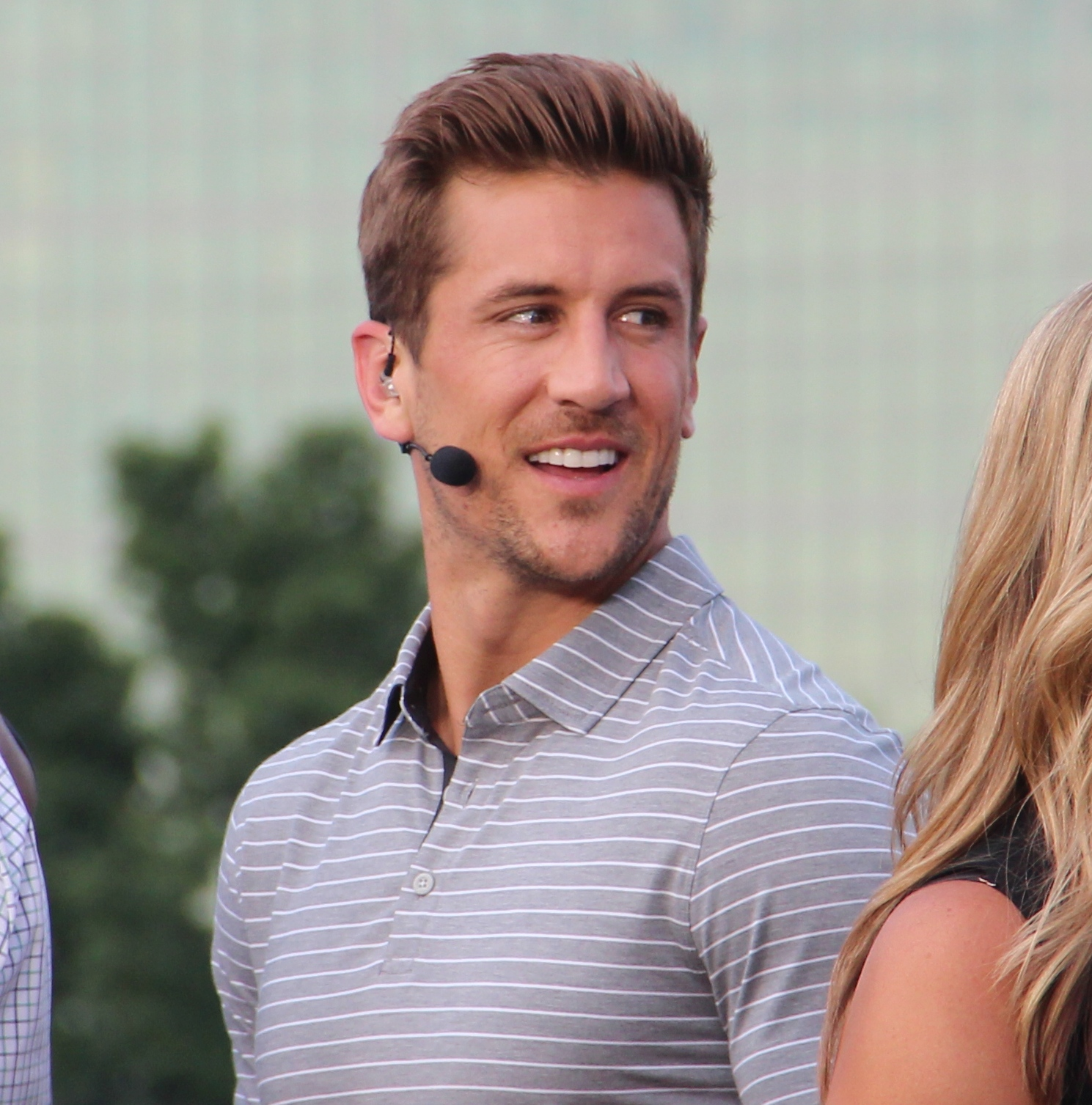
- Rodgers in 2018

No. 6, 18
- Position: Quarterback

Personal information
- Born: August 30, 1988 (age 38); Chico, California, U.S.
- Listed height: 6 ft 1 in (1.85 m)
- Listed weight: 212 lb (96 kg)

Career information
- High school: Pleasant Valley (Chico)
- College: Butte (2008–2009); Vanderbilt (2010–2012)
- NFL draft: 2013: undrafted

Career history
- Jacksonville Jaguars (2013)*; Tampa Bay Buccaneers (2013)*; Miami Dolphins (2014)*; BC Lions (2014)*
- * Offseason or practice squad member only
- Stats at Pro Football Reference

Jordan Edward Rodgers (born August 30, 1988) is an American sports commentator, television personality, and former football player. Rodgers signed with the Jacksonville Jaguars as an undrafted free agent quarterback in 2013, and also played on practice and preseason squads for the Tampa Bay Buccaneers and Miami Dolphins, as well as the BC Lions in the Canadian Football League (CFL). He is the younger brother of NFL quarterback Aaron Rodgers.

== Early life ==
Rodgers was born in Chico, California, and raised there with eldest brother Luke and their middle brother and NFL quarterback, Aaron Rodgers. Rodgers attended Pleasant Valley High School in Chico, where he started as quarterback and led the team to an 8–3–1 record as a senior while also lettering in basketball and track.

== College career ==
After completing high school, he attended and played quarterback at Butte College. At Butte, he was the backup quarterback when the team won the 2008 junior college national title with a 12–0 record. The following year as a starter, he broke the school record for total offense, passing for 2,219 yards and 19 touchdowns. He also earned academic honors.

After completing his two years at BCC, he transferred to Vanderbilt University after also considering the University of Kansas and Western Kentucky University.

In 2011, he began the season as the second-team quarterback and finished the season with seven starts. He completed 108 passes in 216 attempts for 1,524 yards with nine passing touchdowns and 10 interceptions and finished with a passer rating of 113.80. He was also the team's second-leading rusher with 420 yards on 117 carries.

In 2012, he was named offensive co-captain. He started 11 games, becoming the first quarterback to lead the Commodores to back-to-back bowl appearances and a 9–4 record. His quarterback statistics were among the best in Vanderbilt history, with 191 completions, 2,539 yards and 15 touchdowns, completing 59.9 percent of his passes. Rodgers also threw for two touchdowns and ran for one in the team's win over North Carolina State in the Franklin American Mortgage Music City Bowl, which was the team's seventh consecutive win to end the season. His 2012 statistics rank #8 in the school's single season leaders.

Rodgers was an instrumental part of a SEC record while playing for the Commodores, serving as the primary quarterback for career SEC leading wide receiver Jordan Matthews. Once Rodgers became the starting quarterback in 2011, Matthews‘s production rapidly increased. In 2012, the two combined for 90 completions in a season where Matthews set the school record for receiving yards in a season with 1,323, a record he would break again the following year.

Despite playing only two seasons at Vanderbilt, he currently ranks 7th in school history in career total offense. He finished his career with 299 completions, 4,063 passing yards and 24 touchdown passes. His honors include the 2010, 2011 and 2012 SEC Academic Honor Roll and the 2012 Unitas Award Watch List.

== Professional career ==
He was signed by the Jacksonville Jaguars as an undrafted free agent after the 2013 NFL draft. He was released on July 22, 2013.

The Tampa Bay Buccaneers signed Rodgers to the team's practice squad on October 7, 2013 after releasing quarterback Josh Freeman. He remained on the practice squad for the remainder of the season as Mike Glennon became the starter and Dan Orlovsky the backup. Jordan was cut by the Buccaneers on February 10, 2014.

On April 3, 2014, Rodgers was signed by the Miami Dolphins to challenge third-string quarterback Pat Devlin. He was cut on May 12, 2014.

On October 20, 2014, Rodgers was signed as a member of the BC Lions practice roster. After attending the team's mini-camp in April 2015, he retired.

== Career statistics ==
=== College ===
==== CCCAA ====
Year	Team	GP	Passing								Rushing			
Year	Team	GP	Cmp	Att	Pct	Yds	Y/A	TD	Int	Rtg	Att	Yds	Avg	TD
2008	Butte	9	50	96	52.1	819	8.5	10	3	151.9	24	56	2.3	0
2009	Butte	10	121	216	56.0	2,021	9.4	16	7	152.6	71	308	4.3	3
Career		19	171	312	54.8	2,840	9.1	26	10	152.4	95	364	3.8	3

Note: Statistics do not include postseason games. Rodgers came off the bench in Butte's 17–9 victory over Mt. San Antonio in the 2008 California Community College State Championship on December 13, recording 37 rushing yards on two carries and completing his only pass attempt for 13 yards. He suffered a concussion during the game. His individual statistics from Butte's November 22, 2008 Northern California championship victory over Reedley are unknown. Butte also qualified for postseason play in 2009, defeating Sierra College 22–15 in the Premier West Bank Bowl on November 21; Rodgers' individual statistics from that game are unknown.

==== FBS ====
Year	Team	Games			Passing								Rushing			
Year	Team	GP	GS	Record	Cmp	Att	Pct	Yds	Y/A	TD	Int	Rtg	Att	Yds	Avg	TD
2010	Vanderbilt	0	0	—	Redshirted (redshirt)											
2011	Vanderbilt	13	7	3–4	108	216	50.0	1,524	7.1	9	10	113.8	117	420	3.6	4
2012	Vanderbilt	12	12	8–4	191	319	59.9	2,539	8.0	15	5	139.1	91	71	0.8	2
Career		25	19	11–8	299	535	55.9	4,063	7.6	24	15	128.9	208	491	2.4	6

== In the media ==
Rodgers dances along with members of Cirque du Soleil's Mad Apple, as anchor Dari Nowkhah reads a report, on the sideline of Allegiant Stadium before the 2024 Vegas Kickoff Classic for the SEC Network.

Rodgers appeared in Pitch Perfect 2 as a member of the Green Bay Packers.

Rodgers was a contestant and the eventual winner on season 12 of The Bachelorette, starring Joelle "JoJo" Fletcher which aired from May–August 2016. Rodgers proposed; the two were married on May 14, 2022.

During that season of The Bachelorette, Rodgers made significant headlines for publicly revealing the personal rift between Aaron Rodgers and the rest of the Rodgers family, telling Fletcher, "Me and Aaron don't really have that much of a relationship. It's just kind of how he's chosen to live his life." When Aaron Rodgers was asked about the show later that month, he replied, "I’ve always found that it’s a little inappropriate to talk publicly about some family matters,” adding, "I wish [Jordan] well in the competition.”

In September 2018, it was announced that Rodgers and Fletcher would appear in a Kin web series Engaged with JoJo and Jordan, described as a combination of reality TV and DIY home decor.

Beginning in July 2019, Rodgers and Fletcher hosted the CNBC reality show Cash Pad. A combination of house flipping and investment shows, the hosts partner with homeowners hoping to turn their properties into ideal short-term rentals.

Rodgers and Fletcher hosted The Big D, a dating reality show for TBS that was set to premiere on July 7, 2022. However, the show was canceled on June 16, three weeks before the premiere. Ten episodes were produced.

== Broadcasting career ==
On August 2, 2016, Rodgers was hired by ESPN as a college football analyst for the news program SEC Now on the SEC Network.

Preceded by Shawn Booth	The Bachelorette winner Season 12	Succeeded by Bryan Abasolo
