= Chad Johnson (TV personality) =

American television personality

- Born: Brian Chad Johnson; August 11, 1987 (age 39); Jenks, Oklahoma, U.S.
- Education: Jenks High School
- Alma mater: University of Oklahoma
- Occupation: Television personality
- Known for: The Bachelorette; Bachelor in Paradise; Famously Single; Celebrity Big Brother UK

Brian Chad Johnson (born August 11, 1987) is an American reality television personality. He was a contestant on The Bachelorette, Bachelor in Paradise, Famously Single and Celebrity Big Brother UK, and also appeared in the second season of MTV's Ex on the Beach. In his appearance on The Bachelorette, Johnson was regarded as meeting the archetype of a reality television "villain".

Johnson was arrested in February 2020 for robbery with domestic violence enhancement charges involving his girlfriend. The arrest resulted in the cancellation of most of his TV appearances. He subsequently announced that he was starting a career in pornography. In August 2020, Johnson reached a deal with prosecutors in which he pleaded "no contest" to one count of vandalism and one count of intimidating a witness. He was sentenced to 36 months probation and domestic violence classes.

== Early life ==
Chad Johnson was born on August 11, 1987, in Jenks, Oklahoma. He graduated from Jenks High School in 2005 and later graduated from the University of Oklahoma.

== Television career ==
=== The Bachelor franchise ===
In 2016, Johnson became a contestant on the ABC Network reality television show The Bachelorette season 12 to compete for JoJo Fletcher's affections. As the season's "villain", he was nicknamed "Bad Chad".

In the summer of 2016, Johnson joined season three of The Bachelor spin-off show, Bachelor in Paradise. The show follows former Bachelor and Bachelorette contestants living together attempting to find love in Mexico. Johnson was ultimately ejected by host Chris Harrison during the first episode for belligerent behavior.

=== Famously Single ===
In 2017, Johnson was cast as a member of season 2 of the E! network reality television show Famously Single. The series follows eight single celebrities who move in together and try to solve their romantic problems. Alongside Johnson starred I Love New York's Tiffany Pollard, Jersey Shore's Ronnie Ortiz-Magro, Keeping Up with the Kardashians' Malika Haqq, Dancing with the Stars' Karina Smirnoff, and Rich Kids of Beverly Hills Dorothy Wang.

=== Celebrity Big Brother ===
Johnson appeared on Celebrity Big Brother 20. He reached the finale and ultimately finished in 5th place, behind Derek Acorah, Sam Thompson, Amelia Lily and Sarah Harding.

== 2020 arrest and pornographic career ==
On the afternoon of February 24, 2020, Johnson was arrested for robbery with domestic violence enhancement charges. The arrest stemmed from an incident with his girlfriend Annalise Mishler, who alleged that Johnson had assaulted her. When officers arrived, they found visible red marks on Mishler's face. Mishler also alleged that Johnson had punched a hole in a wall. Johnson was charged with one count of assault and battery, one count of corporal injury, one count of witness intimidation, one count of trespassing, and two counts of vandalism.

After the arrest, most of Johnson's previously booked TV appearances were canceled and Johnson claimed to be beginning a career in pornography. In August 2020, Johnson struck a plea deal with prosecutors in which he pleaded "no contest" to one count of vandalism and one count of intimidating a witness. He was sentenced to 36 months probation, domestic violence classes, and faced a restitution hearing to be held a few months later. Four other charges of corporal injury, battery, trespassing, and vandalism were dropped as part of the deal.

== Sunset Studios lawsuit ==
In July 2018, Johnson filed a lawsuit against Sunset Studios Entertainment LLC and Cristina Cimino, an executive for that company. The lawsuit accused the defendants of sexual harassment, failure to prevent harassment, intentional infliction of emotional distress and fraud by intentional misrepresentation. In July 2020, a Los Angeles Superior Court judge ruled that Johnson had proven multiple causes of action against the defendants.

No attorneys for Cimino or Sunset Studios participated in the hearing; the company itself has been defunct since 2019.

== Filmography ==
Year	Title	Role	Note
2016	The Bachelorette	Himself	Season 12
2016	Bachelor in Paradise	Himself	Season 3
2017	Ben & Lauren: Happily Ever After?	Himself	Cameo, 1 episode
2017	Famously Single	Himself	Season 2, 8 episodes
2017	Celebrity Big Brother 20	Himself	Series 20, Finalist – 5th place
2018–2019	Ex on the Beach	Himself	Season 2
2020	The Eric Andre Show	Himself	Season 5 Episode 9
2020	Only Cam: LA	Himself	Guest
