= The Bachelorette (American TV series) season 12 =

12th season of US television series

The Bachelorette
- Season 12
- Promotional poster
- Starring: Joelle "JoJo" Fletcher
- Presented by: Chris Harrison
- No. of contestants: 26
- Winner: Jordan Rodgers
- Runner-up: Robby Hayes
- No. of episodes: 12

Release
- Original network: ABC
- Original release: May 23 – August 1, 2016

Additional information
- Filming dates: March 16 – May 11, 2016

Season chronology
- ← Previous; Season 11 Next → Season 13

The twelfth season of The Bachelorette premiered on ABC on May 23, 2016. This season featured 25-year-old Joelle "JoJo" Fletcher, a real estate developer from Dallas, Texas. Fletcher was the runner-up on season 20 of The Bachelor featuring Ben Higgins.

The season concluded on August 1, 2016, with Fletcher accepting a proposal from 27-year-old former pro quarterback Jordan Rodgers. Rodgers and Fletcher married on May 14, 2022, and currently live in Dallas.

Contestant Chad Johnson, who was eliminated in Week 4, achieved some level of infamy in 2020 due to his arrest for domestic violence and the launch of a career in pornography.

== Production ==
=== Casting and contestants ===
Casting began during season eleven of The Bachelorette. Days before the official announcement, second runner-up Caila Quinn was originally selected to be in the lead role, but she was dropped at the last minute and Fletcher was then named during the After the Final Rose special on the twentieth season of The Bachelor on March 14, 2016, by the producers in response to her popularity on the show. Quinn eventually went on to compete in season 3 of Bachelor in Paradise.

Notable contestant includes former American football quarterback Jordan Rodgers, the younger brother of Green Bay Packers quarterback Aaron Rodgers.

=== Filming and development ===
Filming commenced on March 16, 2016, shortly after the twentieth season of The Bachelor. Destinations including Pittsburgh in Pennsylvania, Uruguay, Thailand, and Argentina with appearances from Dan + Shay, All-4-One, Max Kellerman and Marcellus Wiley.

== Contestants ==
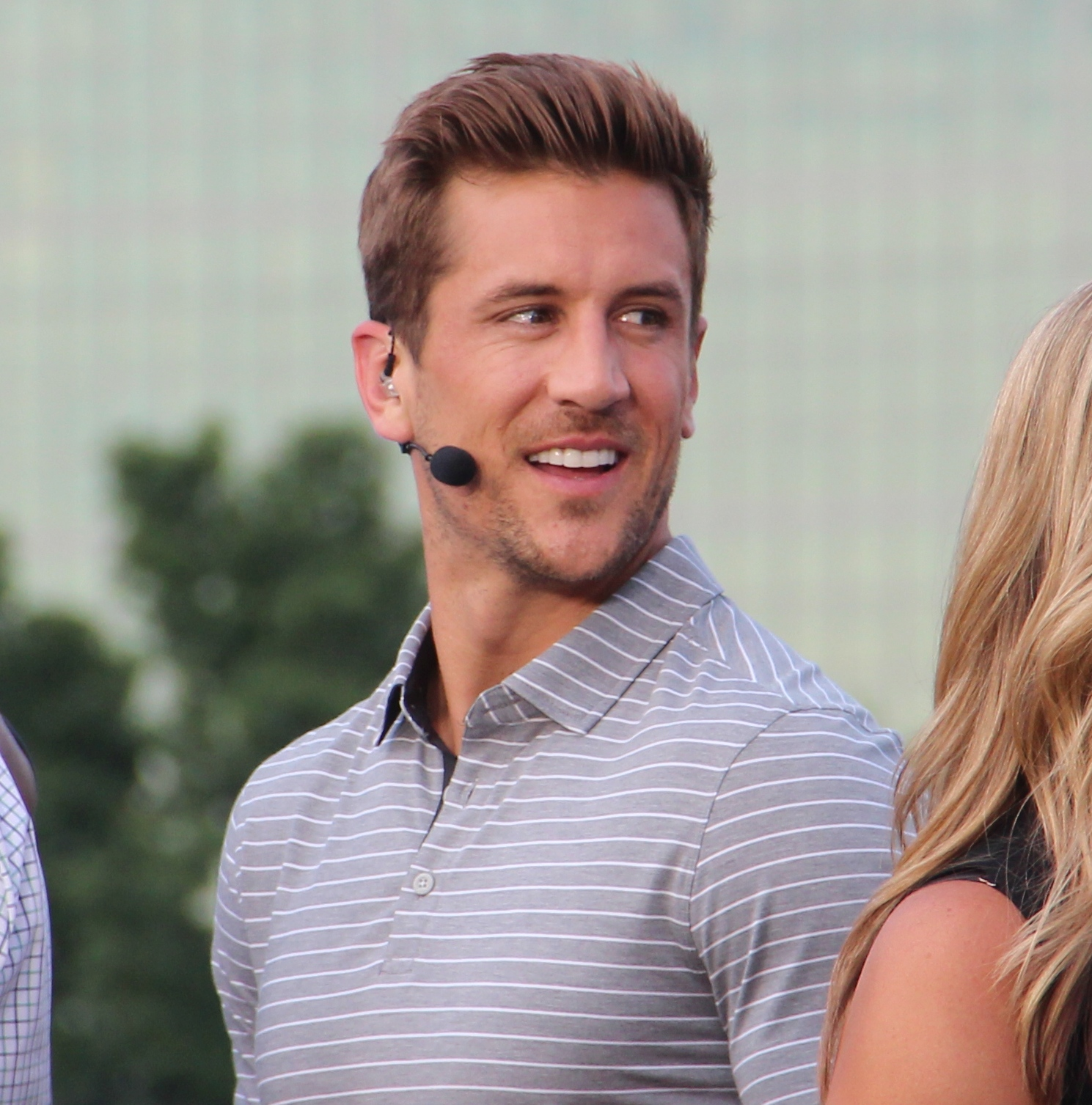
Jordan Rodgers

The season began with 25 contestants.

Name	Age	Hometown	Occupation	Outcome	Place	Ref
**Jordan Rodgers**	**27**	**Chico, California**	**Former Pro Quarterback**	**Winner**	**1**	
Robby Hayes	27	St. Augustine, Florida	Former Competitive Swimmer	Runner-up	2	
Chase McNary	27	Castle Rock, Colorado	Medical Sales Rep	Week 9	3	
Luke Pell	31	Burnet, Texas	War Veteran	Week 8	4	
James Taylor	29	Katy, Texas	Singer-Songwriter	Week 7	5	
Alex Woytkiw	25	Oceanside, California	U.S. Marine	Week 7	6	
Derek Peth	29	Waverly, Iowa	Commercial Banker	Week 6	7	
Wells Adams	31	Monterey, California	Radio DJ	Week 6	8	
Evan Bass	33	Hartford, Connecticut	Erectile Dysfunction Specialist	Week 5	9–11	
Grant Kemp	27	San Francisco, California	Firefighter	Week 5	9–11	
Vincent "Vinny" Ventiera	28	Kings Park, New York	Barber	Week 5	9–11	
Daniel Maguire	31	Lions Bay, British Columbia	Male Model	Week 4	12–13	
James Fuertes	34	Franklin, Tennessee	Boxing Club Owner	Week 4	12–13	
Chad Johnson	28	Jenks, Oklahoma	Real Estate Agent	Week 4	14	
Ali Zahiri	27	Santa Monica, California	Bartender	Week 3	15–17	
Christian Bishop	26	Los Angeles, California	Telecom Consultant	Week 3	15–17	
Nick Benvenutti	33	Carthage, Illinois	Electrical Engineer	Week 3	15–17	
Brandon Howell	28	Marysville, Washington	Hipster	Week 2	18–20	
James Spadafore	27	Phoenix, Arizona	Bachelor Superfan	Week 2	18–20	
Will Haduch	26	Somerville, New Jersey	Civil Engineer	Week 2	18–20	
Colin "Coley" Knust	27	Lincoln Park, Illinois	Real Estate Consultant	Week 1	21–26	
Jake Patton	26	Playa Vista, California	Landscape Architect	Week 1	21–26	
Jonathan Hamilton	29	Vancouver, British Columbia	Technical Sales Rep	Week 1	21–26	
Nick Sharp	26	San Francisco, California	Software Salesman	Week 1	21–26	
Peter Medina	26	Rockdale, Illinois	Staffing Agency Manager	Week 1	21–26	
Salvatore "Sal" DeJulio	28	Hubbard, Ohio	Operations Manager	Week 1	21–26	

=== Future appearances ===
==== Bachelor in Paradise ====
Season 3

Christian Bishop, Chad Johnson, Daniel Maguire, Evan Bass, Grant Kemp, Vinny Ventiera, and Wells Adams returned for the third season of Bachelor in Paradise. Johnson was removed from the show by Chris Harrison in week 1 for aggressive behavior towards everyone. Bishop was eliminated in week 2 and Maguire in week 4. Ventiera quit the show in week 4. Adams split from Ashley Iaconetti in week 6. Bass and Kemp ended the season engaged to Carly Waddell and Lace Morris, respectively.

Season 4

Vinny Ventiera, Daniel Maguire, Nick Benvenutti, Alex Woytkiw, Derek Peth, and Robby Hayes returned for the fourth season of Bachelor in Paradise. Wells Adams returned as the hotel bartender. Woytkiw, Benvenutti, and Ventiera were eliminated in week 1. Hayes split from Amanda Stanton in week 4. Maguire left Paradise in a relationship with Lacey Mark but it was revealed on the reunion special that they had split shortly afterwards. Peth left Paradise in a relationship with Taylor Nolan, and proposed to her during the reunion special.

Season 5

Hayes returned for the fifth season of Bachelor in Paradise. Hayes split from Shushanna Mkrtychyan in week 6.

Season 6

Peth returned for the sixth season of Bachelor in Paradise, along with Chase McNary. Peth quit in week 4. McNary split from Angela Amezcua in week 6.

==== Bachelor in Paradise Australia ====
Season 1

Kemp and Maguire appeared on the inaugural season of the Bachelor in Paradise Australia. Maguire was eliminated in week 3. Kemp left in a relationship with Ali Oetjen.

Season 2

Maguire returned for season 2 of Bachelor in Paradise Australia. He was eliminated in week 5.

==== Celebrity Big Brother UK ====
Johnson competed on season 20 of Celebrity Big Brother UK. After 25 days in the house, he finished in fifth place.

==== The Bachelor Winter Games ====
Luke Pell returned for The Bachelor Winter Games as a part of Team USA. He was eliminated in week 4.

==== The Bachelorette ====
Fletcher served a guest host for the sixteenth season of The Bachelorette while host Chris Harrison was away to take his son in college.

==== Ex on the Beach ====
Season 1

McNary appeared in the first season of the MTV reality series Ex on the Beach.

Season 2

Johnson appeared in the second season of Ex on the Beach.

Season 4

Maguire appeared in the fourth season of Ex on the Beach.

==== Siesta Key ====
Hayes appeared on the third season of the MTV series Siesta Key.

==== The Challenge ====
McNary competed on the thirty-third season of the MTV series The Challenge dubbed War of the Worlds, in which alumni from multiple reality TV shows sought to compete for a $1 million prize. He was eliminated in episode 2.

Cast Member	The Challenges	Challenge Spin-offs	Challenges Won	Total Money Earned
**Chase McNary**	War of the Worlds	-	None	$0

Challenge in bold indicates that the contestant was a finalist on The Challenge.

== Call-out order ==
Order	Bachelors	Week									
Order	Bachelors	1	2	3	4	5	6	7	8	9	10
1	Jordan	Jordan	Wells	Chase	Luke	Jordan	Luke	Robby	Jordan	Jordan	Jordan
2	Derek	Luke	Derek	Evan	Jordan	Derek	Chase	Luke	Robby	Robby	Robby
3	Grant	Wells	James T.	James T.	Alex	Robby	Robby	Jordan	Chase	Chase	
4	James F.	James T.	Alex	Grant	Derek	Luke	Jordan	Chase	Luke		
5	Robby	Grant	Christian	Derek	Robby	Chase	Alex; James T.	James T.			
6	Alex	Derek	Robby	Jordan	Chase	Alex	Alex; James T.	Alex			
7	Will	Christian	Luke	Luke	Wells	James T.	Derek				
8	Chad	Chad	Chase	Robby	Grant	Wells	Wells				
9	Daniel	Chase	Jordan	Wells	Vinny	Evan; Grant; Vinny					
10	Ali	Alex	Grant	James F.	James T.	Evan; Grant; Vinny					
11	James T.	Robby	Ali	Vinny	Evan	Evan; Grant; Vinny					
12	Jonathan	Brandon	Daniel	Daniel	Daniel; James F.						
13	Nick B.	James F.	James F.	Alex	Daniel; James F.						
14	Chase	Ali	Nick B.	Chad	Chad						
15	Jake	Nick B.	Vinny	Ali; Christian; Nick B.							
16	Sal	Will	Evan	Ali; Christian; Nick B.							
17	Coley	James S.	Chad	Ali; Christian; Nick B.							
18	Brandon	Vinny	Brandon; James S. Will								
19	James S.	Evan	Brandon; James S. Will								
20	Nick S.	Daniel	Brandon; James S. Will								
21	Vinny	Coley; Jake; Jonathan; Nick S. Peter; Sal									
22	Peter	Coley; Jake; Jonathan; Nick S. Peter; Sal									
23	Evan	Coley; Jake; Jonathan; Nick S. Peter; Sal									
24	Wells	Coley; Jake; Jonathan; Nick S. Peter; Sal									
25	Christian	Coley; Jake; Jonathan; Nick S. Peter; Sal									
26	Luke	Coley; Jake; Jonathan; Nick S. Peter; Sal									

The contestant received the first impression rose
The contestant received a rose during a date
The contestant was eliminated
The contestant was eliminated during a date
The contestant was part of non-elimination bottom two
The contestant won the competition

== Episodes ==
No. overall	No. in season	Title	Original release date	Prod. code	U.S. viewers (millions)	Rating/share (18–49)
123	1	"Week 1: Season Premiere"	May 23, 2016	1201	6.63	2.0/7
The season begins with JoJo meeting with three former bachelorettes Kaitlyn Bristowe, Desiree Hartsock Siegfried, and Ali Fedotowsky at the mansion where they give her advice for being the Bachelorette. In night one, JoJo greets twenty-six men as the limos arrive. Robby presents a bottle of wine; James Taylor sings a song he wrote for her while playing his guitar; Nick B. (as Saint Nick) dressed in a Santa suit and brought presents for JoJo; Chase shows up wearing glasses and fake mustache to look like a secret agent; Vinny presents a toasted bread; Wells brought All-4-One and they sang the acapella version of "I Swear"; Christian arrives on a motorbike and Luke arrives riding on a horse dressed as a unicorn. Daniel is seen taking off his clothes and jumps into the swimming pool, making a poor impression with some men. Alex did some push-ups while JoJo sits on his back. Nick S. tries to further impress JoJo as she sits on his lap to tell "Santa" what she wants. Ali plays Beethoven on the piano for JoJo. Jordan received the first impression rose. Family friend and season fourteen Bachelor Jake Pavelka came to the mansion interrupting the beginning of the rose ceremony where he wished all the best on her journey to find love. Concluding the ceremony, Coley, Jake, Jonathan, Nick S., Peter and Sal were eliminated.
124	2	"Week 2"	May 30, 2016	1202	5.94	1.6/5
For the first group date, Luke, Grant, Will, Evan, Daniel, Vinny, Ali, James F., Wells and Robby were chosen, but soon after the limo arrived it caught fire. The men were surprised to see JoJo coming to the rescue in a sexy firefighter outfit to put out the blaze. The ten contenders were taken to Rio Hondo Fire Academy where the firemen gave them a demonstration about fire safety tests. Soon after the challenge begins, Wells almost passes out during demonstration test and Grant (a trained firefighter) takes a commanding lead. Wells, Luke and Grant are chosen in the final round to save JoJo inside the tower, Grant wins the challenge. In the end, Wells receives a rose. Derek received the first one-on-one date of this season. JoJo had an option to pick two choices, and chose "Sky", as he took a private jet flight to San Francisco where they have a picnic together overlooking Golden Gate Bridge. He receives a rose. Jordan, Christian, Nick B., James Taylor, Alex and Chad took for a second group date went to ESPN studios and had to take part with SportsNation. They met with hosts Marcellus Wiley and Max Kellerman which they participated in a segment called BachelorNation into three separate challenges. James Taylor wins the segment, and receives alone time with JoJo, and she gives a rose to him. At the cocktail party, Chad gets confrontational with the other men, Evan steals JoJo away for some alone time. At the rose ceremony, Brandon, James S. and Will were eliminated.
125	3	"Week 3"	June 6, 2016	1203	6.90	2.0/7
Chase took his one-on-one date into a yoga class and go to a winery, with a surprise from Lady Antebellum's Charles Kelley. He receives a rose. At the mansion, Chad confronted about James Taylor's life as a singer, making too much for him and Chad became commiserate on his tolerant behavior. Chad, along with Jordan, Grant, Wells, James F., Christian, Ali, Daniel, Vinny, Nick B., Evan and Alex had the group date where they meet with Jenna Brister for a sensual sex class. Evan shares his spotlight about the facts of steroid usage and combined drugs, while he completed his sex talk skit, Chad calls up at the stage where he ripped Evan's shirt and he spots at the limelight by kissing JoJo in front of the stage, then Chad punched at the door and pulled Evan's neck on stage that left him upset and hard-headed. At the after party, Evan and Chad began to bicker and constantly argue on what they did on the portion of the date. In the end, Evan received the rose and Chad continued to frustrate. Back at the mansion, the producers hired a security guard to protect and watch Chad over. James Taylor received on his one-on-one date, JoJo drove him to Culver City to take swing dancing classes and joined with the couples swinging their dance moves at the park, they spent their time at Hollywood Hills overlooking Los Angeles skyline. He receives a rose. Chris Harrison came the mansion where he told the men that would have a pool party, Evan talked to Chris about on Chad's frantic violence on what they happened during the group date, Chris called Chad over to stop the madness and he asked to stay. However, the episode ends in cliffhanger.
126	4	"Week 4: Nemacolin"	June 7, 2016	1204	6.77	2.0/8
Continuing from the previous episode, Evan gave an apology to Chad on what he had done during the group date and owed with a new shirt. At the pool party, Evan fought with the other men inside the pool. Chris Harrison arrives at the mansion, leaving Chad uncomfortable with his future in the competition. At the rose ceremony, Ali, Christian and Nick B. are eliminated. The fourteen remaining men announced from Chris to travel to Pittsburgh, Pennsylvania to meet with JoJo. Luke received his one-on-one to take dog sledding into the Pennsylvania countryside and had relaxing on a wooden hot tub experience at Nemacolin Woodlands Resort. He receives the rose, afterwards, he and JoJo attend a concert from Dan + Shay at The Palace. Derek, James Taylor, Daniel, Chase, Wells, Vinny, James F., Evan, Grant, Jordan and Robby took a group date while boarded out on a boat ride in Downtown Pittsburgh and arrived at Heinz Field to meet with JoJo and play football. Professional football players Ben Roethlisberger, Hines Ward and Brett Keisel give them tips and since Jordan knows football very well. They split into two teams, while the loser would be sent home. The blue team won and have to spend time with JoJo. Jordan receives a rose. The men started a nonsense verbal war against Chad, wishing to send him home. Chad and Alex received the two-on-one date hiking into the Pennsylvania woods, Alex expresses the rest of the men's concerns about Chad and his physical abusive behavior. JoJo gives the rose to Alex and sent Chad home, much to the delight of the remaining men. The episode ended in another cliffhanger.
127	5	"Week 5: Uruguay"	June 20, 2016	1205	7.05	2.1/8
Concluded from the previous episode, the remaining men continued to excite on Chad's farewell party, but the latter returns to the lodge, Jordan was not pleased due to his dismay as Chad tries to give his apology to the men that he should consider for misunderstanding and uncommon issues. Soon, he finally leaves for good. At the rose ceremony, Daniel and James F. are eliminated. The remaining men traveled down south to Punta del Este, Uruguay. Jordan took his one-on-one date board onto a yacht to Isla de Lobos and swim with seals. JoJo gives him a rose. At the hotel, a producer told JoJo holding an In Touch Weekly magazine where she addressed the tabloids about her ex-boyfriend prior joining to The Bachelor, she went upset and came to the men' room at the same hotel, JoJo went depressed and became very unhappy as soon she would be going to move on. Luke, Derek, Chase, Evan, James Taylor, Vinny, Grant, Wells and Alex had the group date went surfing on Uruguayan sand dunes, but it ends with a torrential rainstorm that cancels their outing. Derek receives the rose and felt reassured. Robby had his one-on-one date started at Playa Brava and ended on a night club in Punta del Este, and they walk downtown to a fireworks show. Robby receives a rose. Chris Harrison showed up at the winery and told the men there would be no cocktail party and head straight to the rose ceremony. At the rose ceremony, Evan, Grant and Vinny are eliminated.
128	6	"Week 6: Buenos Aires"	June 27, 2016	1206	6.85	2.0/7
The remaining men traveled west to Buenos Aires, Argentina. Chris Harrison stopped by to talk with JoJo at the park and greets the men at Plaza de Mayo that there will be a one-on-one date, a group date, and for the first time in series history, a second two-on-one date. Wells finally goes on his one-on-one date with Jojo, he admits to the remaining men that he has not kissed her yet. Wells and Jojo explored the city and sights on the streets of Buenos Aires until reaching the city park where they see a Fuerza Bruta. Though Wells kisses JoJo, she doesn't give him the rose and sends him home, leaving JoJo attend a real Fuerza Bruta stage all by herself. Robby, James Taylor, Alex, Jordan, and Luke go on the group date. They explore the streets of the La Boca neighborhood to play soccer with the locals. James tells JoJo about Jordan's obnoxious behavior. JoJo confronts Jordan on the spot, and she gives a rose to Luke. Chase and Derek received the two-on-one date had to take part in a tango and they had dinner on a fancy restaurant. Chase receives a rose and Derek is sent home. JoJo and Chase attended on a stage by Soledad Pastorutti singing "Don't Cry for Me Argentina" where they were serenaded. At the cocktail party, JoJo surprises the men how to spend their time together. At the rose ceremony, JoJo gets nervous at the thought about eliminating one man at the end of the week, her decision was uncertain and she changed her mind that Alex and James Taylor received the last two roses.
129	7	"Week 7: Mendoza"	July 11, 2016	1207	6.86	1.9/7
The six men continued in Buenos Aires, Chris asked them to travel by bus to an unknown destination while JoJo had already left the hotel to stay in the middle of nowhere. Alex had his one-on-one date traveled to the Argentinean countryside near Buenos Aires, had to meet up with two Gaucho people where they train how to do like these real Gaucho people. At dinner, Alex reveals he loves JoJo, and though there was not a rose to give out, he is eliminated after being told that she did not feel the same way. Jordan received the one-on-one date with JoJo where they took a private flight to Mendoza in Argentina's wine country, arriving the vineyard while they crushing grapes by foot and drinking wines. He later opened up to JoJo about the relationship on his famous brother Aaron that has not becoming very close with each other. Chase, Robby, and James Taylor had a group date in Downtown Buenos Aires where rain interrupts JoJo's original plans for the date, so she and the men spend the day in a hotel room playing games. James Taylor eats 25 pieces of fries, Chase takes part for a quiz and Robby participates truth and dare where he strips on his underwear. Robby is given the rose. On the final day in Argentina, Luke had the last one-on-one date riding horses and went skeet shooting. At the rose ceremony, James was eliminated.
130	8	"Week 8: Hometowns"	July 18, 2016	1208	6.72	1.9/7
JoJo traveled the hometowns of four men. Chase's hometown date began at Castle Rock, Colorado and trekked above Daniels Park to stroll the day over because Chase's parents are divorced. He introduced JoJo to his dad at his house, then she meets his mom, stepdad and the rest of his family into a separate meeting at his mom's house. Jordan's hometown date at Chico, California where they visited his alumna of Pleasant Valley High School as they see pictures of his brother Aaron on the wall. when Jordan's other brother Luke told JoJo that Jordan is estranged to Aaron and has not talking a lot in few years as a family. Robby's hometown took place at St. Augustine, Florida into the historic district riding a horse drawn carriage throughout the city and having an idyllic seaside lunch. Then, they arrived at Robby's home in nearby Jacksonville, his mom tells him about his relationship with his ex-girlfriend and told they broke up before going on the show. He brings this up to JoJo and assures her it is a lie. Luke's hometown date at Burnet, Texas to show the latter town and met with his family, including a heart-to-heart with his father, and ends on a horse riding through the sunset view of the fields. At the rose ceremony, Luke is calling around that he has going to be eliminated, but ended in cliffhanger.
131	9	"Week 9: Fantasy Suites"	July 25, 2016	1209	6.38	1.9/7
Concluding from the previous episode as the rose ceremony starts in progress, Luke was sent home, then JoJo felt with blindside on Luke's elimination and caused her very upset and heartbroken. The final three men head to Hua Hin in Thailand. Robby got a stroll on Thai massages. At dinner, Robby reiterated that he loves JoJo and gives her a note from his father to prove how he feels and ends up in the fantasy suite that night. Jordan went for a hike and end up in a temple. JoJo questions Jordan about their future together and he got the fantasy suite as well. Jordan said to JoJo the next morning on "a very important step" from last night. Chase went to a secluded beach into a boat ride for a relaxing day. He expresses to JoJo about the hometown experience. When Robby came to JoJo's hotel room in the middle of Chase's fantasy date, they talk about on their personal matters, stating on how hard the relationship would do. Just as Chase initially accepted his fantasy suite, but JoJo sent him home caused more retaliate and completely depressed on his feelings. At the rose ceremony, JoJo wants to present the remaining two men with roses. Chase surprisingly shows up, and apologizes for how he reacted the previous night. Robby and Jordan are given roses.
132	10	"The Men Tell All"	July 26, 2016	N/A	5.14	1.4/5
Sixteen of the twenty-six eliminated men sat down for the audience. Several of the contestants spoke of their lives after the competition. They told stories about making Chad's apology even though he does not show up. Chad went on hot seat first told about that he has dating Grant's ex-girlfriend, and Robby's ex-girlfriend as well in much of Grant's huge dismay, then his confrontation with Nick B. to make his plea and Chris Harrison told about Chad's story that his mom had died six months before joining to the show, then Chris announced that Chad will be appearing in Bachelor in Paradise. Luke shows on his feelings that he was in love with JoJo, but he didn't carry with his true confession, stated that he would want to fall in love once more. Chase told about his situation during the hometown dates and recalling the fantasy suite process, JoJo shows up with the men and gets talk to Chase how what they happened during their time around and one woman has shown up on stage who happens to be Vinny's mother, JoJo told her that he would be having to shave his beard even they could become friendliness to each other. The show finishes with Chad talking to JoJo and she gave him a standing ovation.
133	11	"Week 10: Season Finale"	August 1, 2016	1210	8.57	2.5/9
Robby and Jordan have an opportunity to meet with JoJo's family Phuket Province. Both men have doubts after hearing a conversation from JoJo's parents that Robby wanted to have his decision to marry JoJo at the end, while Jordan praised to JoJo's father that is going to make a deal for a hand in marriage. Robby's final date involving to settle down on a secluded beach at the private island. Jordan's final date involves riding a traditional junk and kayaked through series of underground lakes on a cave. Before the rose ceremony, JoJo makes a deal with an awaiting engagement and read each men's letter that one of them would become her husband. Jordan called JoJo's father to ask for having a permission to marry her and accepts his decision. When Robby comes with a surprise and the trip ends cut short, leaving him heartbroken and torn. Soon when Jordan arrived, he presents an engagement ring and pops the question. JoJo accepts the engagement.
134	12	"After the Final Rose"	August 1, 2016	N/A	8.10	2.3/9
As the engagement became emotional, Robby came first to the hot seat to say why he felt blindsided and miserable, then JoJo came on stage to see Robby regretting that she would love him. Robby denied the reply. Later, Jordan came out to the audience into a public appearance and he announced he would move to Dallas that his belongings were already packed and plans for marriage. Chris gives a pre-honeymoon present for them to the beautiful Nemacolin Woodlands Resort in Pennsylvania. Former Bachelor Ben Higgins and his fiancée Lauren Bushnell are in the audience as well giving encourage with the new couple to stay longer.
