= Evan Bass =

American television personality

- Born: December 17, 1982 (age 43); Nashville, Tennessee, United States
- Occupations: Businessperson, television personality
- Spouse: Carly Waddell (m. 2017; sep. 2020)
- Children: 5

Evan Bass is an American businessperson and television personality. He has appeared as a contestant on the Reality television shows The Bachelorette and Bachelor in Paradise. Evan married Carly Waddell in 2017 following their season of Bachelor in Paradise. The couple announced their separation in December 2020.

== Career ==
Bass appeared as a contestant on the twelfth season of the reality television matchmaking show The Bachelorette, starring Joelle "JoJo" Fletcher. He subsequently appeared on its spin-off show, Bachelor in Paradise, where he became engaged to Carly Waddell, a contestant on season 19 of The Bachelor.

== Personal life ==
Bass has three sons from a previous relationship. On June 17, 2017, Evan and Carly got married in Mexico and in August 2017, announced that they were having a baby girl due in February 2018. On February 15, 2018, their daughter was born. In May 2019, they announced that they were expecting another child, a boy, whose gender was revealed on the season finale of the 2019 season of Bachelor in Paradise. On November 12, 2019, their son was born.
