= Wells Adams =

American television and radio personality (born 1984)

- Born: May 16, 1984 (age 42); Monterey, California, U.S.
- Education: University of Mississippi
- Occupations: Television personality; radio personality; podcast host
- Years active: 2013–present
- Spouse: Sarah Hyland (m. 2022)

Wells Adams (born May 16, 1984) is an American television and radio personality, and podcast host.

== Early life and education ==
Wells Adams was born on May 16, 1984, in Monterey, California. He has two brothers and two sisters.

In 2007, he graduated from the University of Mississippi with a bachelor's degree in broadcast journalism, and also minored in English and public relations.

== Career ==
=== Radio and audio ===
Adams moved to Nashville, Tennessee in 2013, beginning his media career as a radio host, DJ, and producer on the morning show at WRLT, an adult album alternative-formatted station in Nashville.

In July 2015, Adams joined iHeartRadio in Nashville, hosting afternoons on WNRQ (105.9 "The Rock") and mornings on WNRQ-HD2 (Alt 98.3). He also served as the station's assistant program director and music director. While at iHeartRadio, he co-created the podcast Your Favorite Thing with Wells & Brandi with actress and DJ Brandi Cyrus.

In November 2025, Adams co-created the golf podcast Vanity Index with Full Swing creator Chad Mumm, for the Golf Channel.

=== Television ===
In May 2016, Adams appeared as a contestant on the twelfth season of the reality television matchmaking show, The Bachelorette, which featured JoJo Fletcher as the series lead. In the series, Adams and Fletcher's relationship remained platonic, and he was eliminated in week six.

In August 2016, he appeared as a contestant on the third season of Bachelor in Paradise, a spin-off of The Bachelor and The Bachelorette, which features previous contestants from both series. Adams joined in week four and formed a brief romantic connection with fellow contestant Ashley Iaconetti, but their relationship did not progress, and he left the series in week six. In 2017, Adams rejoined Bachelor in Paradise for the fourth season as the show's bartender, a role he continues to hold in the current season alongside co-bartender, Hannah Brown.

In 2020, Adams appeared as a contestant on the nineteenth season of the reality television cooking series, Worst Cooks in America, and won the season. In September 2022, Adams hosted the pizza competition series, Best in Dough on Hulu. In 2023, Adams guest starred on an episode of the competition show Play-Doh Squished, hosted by his wife Sarah Hyland. In January 2025, Adams appeared on the third season of the reality competition series, The Traitors. He was the first contestant banished, in the second episode. In November 2025, Adams hosted the holiday-themed baking competition series, Sweet Empire: Winter Wars on the Food Network.

== Personal life ==
In 2017, Adams began a relationship with Sarah Hyland, an actress and singer best known for playing Haley Dunphy on the ABC sitcom Modern Family. The couple became engaged in July 2019, and in May 2020, they purchased a home in Los Angeles, a month before their planned wedding date. However, the COVID-19 pandemic caused them to postpone their wedding multiple times. An outdoor bridal shower in early June 2022 marked the end of their two-year delay, and the couple married at a California vineyard on August 20, 2022.

== Filmography ==
=== Television ===
Year	Title	Role(s)	Notes	Ref.
2016–2021	The Bachelorette	Contestant / Himself	Season 12: Contestant; Season 16–17: Guest; 9 episodes	
2016–2025	Bachelor in Paradise	Contestant / Bartender	Season 3: Contestant; Season 4–10: Bartender; 80 episodes	
2016	Bachelor in Paradise: After Paradise	Himself	Episode: "Week 4"; Guest	
2017; 2019	Celebrity Family Feud	Contestant	2 episodes	
2020	Worst Cooks in America	Contestant	6 episodes	
2020	Celebrity Game Face	Contestant	1 episode	
2022	Best in Dough	Host		
2023	Play-Doh Squished	Himself / Guest Judge	Episode: "Pets"	
2025	The Traitors	Contestant	Season 3	
2025	Sweet Empire: Winter Wars	Host		

=== Podcast ===
Year	Title	Host(s)	Genre	Notes	Ref.
2017–present	Your Favorite Thing with Wells & Brandi	Wells Adams, Brandi Cyrus	Talk show	with Podcast Nation	
2025–present	Vanity Index	Wells Adams, Chad Mumm	Golf	with Golf Channel	
