= Amanda Stanton =

American actress and reality TV star

- Born: April 9, 1990 (age 35); Mission Viejo, California, U.S.
- Occupations: Actress; reality TV star; fashion blogger
- Years active: 2006–present
- Known for: The Bachelor (2016)
- Spouses: Nick Buonfiglio (m. 2012; div. 2015); Michael Fogel (m. 2022)
- Children: 3

Amanda Dahan Stanton (born April 9, 1990) is an American actress, reality TV star, and fashion blogger. She is known for the TV movie Merry Christmas, Drake & Josh (2008), the reality TV shows The Bachelor (2016), and Bachelor in Paradise (2017).

== Early life and career ==
Stanton was born on April 9, 1990, in Mission Viejo, California, U.S. She graduated from the Paul Mitchel Esthetician School at California.

Stanton started her career in the Disney Channel's movie The Cheetah Girls 2 in 2006. She acted in the TV movie Merry Christmas, Drake & Josh (2008). She also played a small role in the movie Kissing Strangers (2010).

Stanton gained attention when she appeared on the TV show The Bachelor which was aired on ABC from January 4, 2016, to March 14, 2016. She came in fourth place in the reality show and was eliminated in week 8. She then went on to star in another TV show, Bachelor in Paradise, where she met and got engaged to Josh Murray.

On her blog, she also advertises affiliate products. In 2019, Stanton wrote a memoir, "Now Accepting Roses" about her life before, during, and after her involvement in the reality shows.

== Personal life ==
From October 2012 to June 2015, Stanton was married to Nick Buonfiglio. Kinsley and Charlie are their two daughters. After Season 3 of Bachelor in Paradise, she got engaged to Josh Murray. In December 2016, the pair called off their engagement. She later returned to the popular reality show and rekindled her relationship with an old boyfriend, Robby Hayes. In February 2021, during a Valentine's Day holiday in Mexico, she introduced Michael Fogel as a potential partner to social media. They got engaged by the end of the year. Stanton and Fogel married on September 2, 2022 at Kestrel Park in Santa Ynez, California. Their first child together, a daughter Rosie, was born in 2024.

In February 2018, Stanton had breast augmentation surgery. She accused that some hacker stole her topless photos from her surgeon's office.

In September 2018, she was arrested for domestic abuse and brought into custody for assaulting her boyfriend, Bobby Jacobs, in Las Vegas.

== Filmography ==
Year	Title	Role	Notes	Ref.
2008	Merry Christmas, Drake & Josh	Hot girl	Television movie	
2010	Kissing Strangers	Mr. Koster's Daughter	Romantic comedy	
2007	Nickelodeon Kids' Choice Awards '07	Herself	TV special	
2008	Nickelodeon Kids' Choice Awards '08	Herself	TV special	
2016	The Bachelor	Contestant as Amanda	Reality show	
2017	Bachelor in Paradise	Contestant as Amanda	Reality show	
2018	Entertainment Tonight	Herself	TV show	
