= MuckFest MS =

5K run obstacle course supporting multiple sclerosis

MuckFest is a mud and obstacle 5K run series designed by special effects and event production specialists from Hollywood, with donations raised going to the National Multiple Sclerosis Society. The MuckFest event culture and course emphasize a blend of athleticism and adventure running with 15+ obstacles with names like Big Balls, Mt. Muck-imanjaro and Muck Off. It is positioned as an alternative to some of the other mud runs that are based on pain and endurance.

== Production team and charity partner ==
MuckFest is produced by Event 360, Inc. in partnership with the National Multiple Sclerosis Society. Event 360 is based in Chicago and Los Angeles and is most well known for producing the long-running Susan G. Komen 3-Day for the Cure series. The donations raised by MuckFest participants go to the National MS Society, and participants have raised $30 million since the start of the event.

== Event participants ==
For MuckFest, runners are called "muckers." MuckFest attracts an almost even split of men and women across a broad range of age groups. The event is self-timed and the course and obstacles are designed to allow for a wide range of abilities, from top triathletes and marathoners to beginning athletes and groups from exercise boot camps and gyms. Because of its affiliation with National MS Society, every event includes runners who are living with multiple sclerosis, some of whom complete the course using a cane for stability.

== Notable participants ==
Former Jacksonville Jaguar Pete Mitchell led a team in the 2013 MuckFest Jacksonville and was one of the event's top fundraisers. Nicole "Snooki" Polizzi ran in the 2013 MuckFest New Jersey.

== Featured obstacles on the 5K course ==
- Big Balls – a signature obstacle, runners must navigate nine or more swinging balls (approximately 10 feet in diameter) suspended by cranes above four mud pits.
- Swing Set – runners catapult themselves into water from three steel-constructed swinging platforms that the runners stand on and rock to gain momentum.
- Mt. Muck-imanjaro – a rope-climbing, triangular steel structure more than 20 feet high.
- Walk on Water – runners run single-file and jump over round pontoons on a thin 80-foot runway that floats on top of the water.
- The Spinner – a self-propelled carousel-sized main structure with four cantilevered arms that carry runners, holding on by ropes, over a mud pit six to eight feet below.
- Muck Off – runners jump or acrobatically flip off a wide steel platform eight feet above a deep pool.
- Spider Web – on the first pass, runners fight their way through mud and elastic cords impeding a clear path; on the second pass the runners climb linked ropes over the runners below.

== 2016 season and sites ==
Season	Location	Date
Boston, MA	Willard Athletic Complex	May 14 & 15
Philadelphia, PA	The grounds of The Glen Mills Schools	June 4 & 5
New Jersey, NJ	Essex County South Mountain Reservation	June 25 & 26
Denver, CO	Salisbury North	July 16
Detroit, MI	Willow Metropark	August 6
Twin Cities, MN	Scott County Fair	August 20
Chicago, IL	Lake County Fairgrounds	September 10
San Francisco, CA	Solano County Fairgrounds	October 1
Houston, TX	Royal Purple Raceway	October 15
Dallas, TX	Southfork Ranch	October 29
Los Angeles, CA	Prado Regional Park	November 12

Site information adapted from the official website.

== 2015 season and sites ==
City	Location	Date
Boston, MA	Wilard Athletic Complex	Apr 25-26
Denver, CO	TBD	May 16
Philadelphia, PA	TBD	May 30-31
New Jersey	Essex County South Mountain Reservation	Jun 13-14
St. Louis, MO	Federated Auto Parts Raceway	Jul 11
Detroit, MI	Willow Metropark	Aug 1
Chicago, IL	Lake County Fairgrounds	Aug 29
Twin Cities	Somerset Amphitheater	Sep 19
San Francisco, CA	Solano County Fairgrounds	Oct 10
Los Angeles, CA	Prado Regional Park	Oct 24
Houston, TX	Royal Purple Raceway	Nov 14

== 2014 season and sites ==
Season	Date
Jacksonville, FL	Mar 22
Boston, MA	Apr 26-Apr 27
Philadelphia, PA	May 31-Jun 1
New Jersey	Jun 21
St. Louis, MO	Jul 12
Twin Cities, MN	Aug 02
Chicago, IL	Aug 23
Denver, CO	Sep 13
San Francisco, CA	Oct 11
Los Angeles, CA	Oct 25
