= Kaitlyn Bristowe =

Canadian television personality (born 1985)

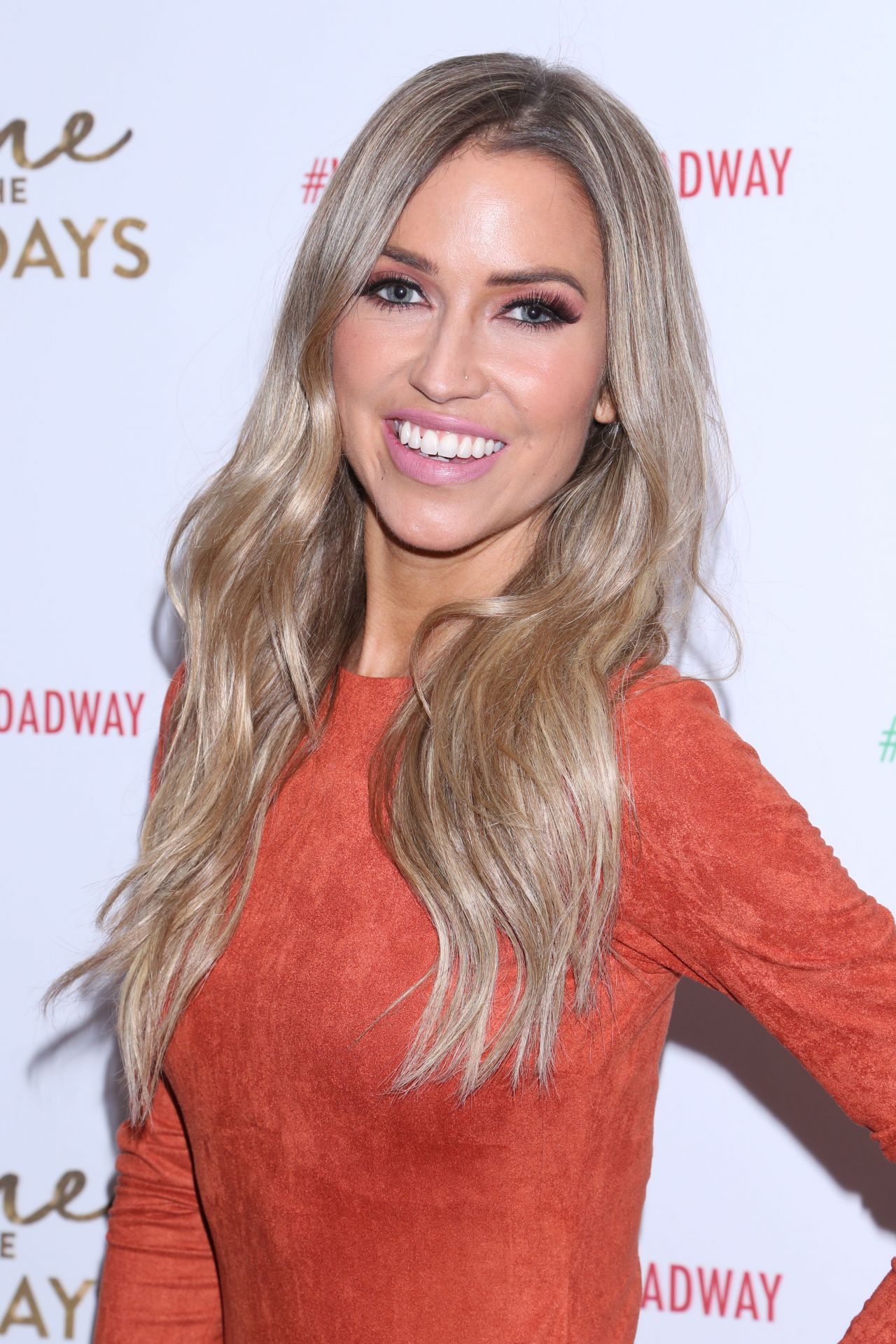
- Born: Kaitlyn Dawn Bristowe; June 19, 1985 (age 41); Leduc, Alberta, Canada
- Education: Leduc Composite High School
- Occupations: Television personality, podcast host
- Partner: Jason Tartick (2019–2023)

Kaitlyn Dawn Bristowe (born June 19, 1985) is a Canadian television personality best known for being a contestant on the nineteenth season of ABC's The Bachelor, and as the lead on the eleventh season of The Bachelorette. She won the season 29 of Dancing with the Stars, with partner Artem Chigvintsev.

== Early life ==
The daughter of a ballerina, Bristowe grew up in Leduc, Alberta, and moved as an adult to Vancouver, British Columbia, a dance scholarship where she became a spin-class instructor.

== Career ==
=== Television ===
==== The Bachelor ====
Bristowe was a contestant on Chris Soules' season of The Bachelor. She placed third overall, losing to runner-up Becca Tilley and winner Whitney Bischoff.

==== The Bachelorette ====
On The Bachelor "After the Final Rose" segment, host Chris Harrison announced that season eleven would begin with two Bachelorettes, Bristowe and fellow season nineteen contestant Britt Nilsson. Bristowe became the official bachelorette of season eleven. The season ultimately ended in her engagement to contestant Shawn Booth.

Bristowe co-hosted season 17 and season 18 of The Bachelorette alongside fellow former Bachelorette Tayshia Adams.

==== Dancing with the Stars ====
During the airing of The Bachelor: The Greatest Seasons – Ever! in June 2020, host Chris Harrison offered Bristowe a spot on the upcoming season of Dancing with the Stars, which she accepted. Previously Bristowe alleged that The Bachelor creator Mike Fleiss had blocked Bristowe from participating on the show when she was offered a spot in 2015 after her season of The Bachelorette had finished airing.

On September 2, 2020, Bristowe was announced as one of the celebrities competing on the 29th season of Dancing with the Stars. She was partnered with professional dancer Artem Chigvintsev, and on November 23, 2020, they were declared the winners of the season.

On November 8, 2021, Bristowe was announced as one of the stars joining the Dancing with the Stars Live! - 2022 Tour. She is joining other professionals on the show, including her season 29 partner, Artem. She was set to perform at 55 out of the 66 dates.

=== Other ventures ===
In her early 20s, Bristowe earned a spot as a cheerleader for the BC Lions in the Canadian Football League.

Her podcast, Off the Vine with Kaitlyn Bristowe, began on May 29, 2017. In 2019, she started her wine label Spade and Sparrows. On May 14, 2020, Bristowe released her debut single "If I'm Being Honest".

On August 18, 2025, Bristowe co-hosted alongside Colton Underwood on a dating reality series titled, Are You My First? Featuring twenty-one virgin singles that premiered on Hulu.

== Personal life ==
On November 2, 2018, Bristowe and Booth made a joint statement announcing they had broken up.

Bristowe started dating Jason Tartick, a former contestant from Becca Kufrin's season of The Bachelorette, in January 2019. Bristowe and Tartick shared a home in Nashville, Tennessee, with two golden retrievers. In September 2019, the couple starred in country singer Brett Kissel's music video for his number one hit "Drink About Me". In November 2020, the couple's dogs starred in the music video for Kissel's "A Few Good Stories" with Walk off the Earth. In May 2021, Bristowe and Tartick announced their engagement. On August 6, 2023, Bristowe and Tartick released a joint statement that they decided to end their engagement.

Bristowe revealed on the Out & About podcast that she is bisexual.

Bristowe appeared on the Talk Tuah podcast by Haliey Welch on September 24, 2024.

== Filmography ==
=== As a television personality ===
Television
Year	Title	Role	Notes
2015–2022	The Bachelor	Contestant	Contestant on season 19; 15 episodes
2015–2023	The Bachelorette	Various roles	The Bachelorette on season 11; Advisor on season 12; Co-host on season 17 and 18
2015–2016	Celebrity Family Feud	Contestant	2 episodes
2017	Who Wants to Be a Millionaire	Contestant	2 episodes
2018	Steve	Panelist	Episode: "Tracy Morgan/Beverly Bond, Kaitlyn Bristowe & Garcelle Beauvais"
2020	Dancing with the Stars	Contestant	Contestant and winner on season 29
2020	The Bachelor Presents: Listen to Your Heart	Judge	Episode: "Week 6 -- Finale"
2024	Talk Tuah	Guest	Episode: "I MADE IT OFFICIAL WITH POOKIE - Talk Tuah Ep. 3 with Kaitlyn Bristowe"
2025	Are You My First?	Co-host	10 episodes

Music videos
Year	Title	Artist	Notes
2019	"Drink About Me"	Brett Kissel	

Preceded by Andi Dorfman	The Bachelorette; Season 11 (2015)	Succeeded by JoJo Fletcher
Preceded by Hannah Brown & Alan Bersten	Dancing with the Stars (US) winner Season 29 (Fall 2020 with Artem Chigvintsev)	Succeeded by Iman Shumpert & Daniella Karagach
