= Devin Taylor (wrestler) =

American model and professional wrestler

Personal information
- Born: Brittany Christine Fetkin; February 3, 1988 (age 38) San Diego, California, U.S.
- Education: Loyola Marymount University; University of Miami; University of Southern California

Professional wrestling career
- Ring name: Devin Taylor
- Billed height: 5 ft 4 in (1.63 m)
- Billed weight: 115 lb (52 kg; 8.2 st)
- Billed from: Temecula, California
- Trained by: WWE Performance Center
- Debut: June 6, 2014

Brittany Christine Fetkin (born February 3, 1988) is an American model, television personality, and former professional wrestler. She is known for her work in WWE's developmental territory, NXT, where she served as a backstage interviewer under the ring name Devin Taylor.

== Early life ==
Fetkin was born in San Diego, California and raised in Temecula, California. She is of Japanese, Lithuanian, and Ukrainian descent. Fetkin is a graduate of Loyola Marymount University with a degree in broadcast journalism. A competitive soccer player since her childhood, Fetkin competed in the Youth World Cup in Sweden and earned scholar athletes honors during her formative years.

== Professional wrestling career ==
=== WWE (2013–2015) ===
Fetkin signed a contract with the professional wrestling promotion WWE in 2013 and was assigned to their developmental territory, NXT, where she was given the ring name Devin Taylor. She debuted as a backstage interviewer on the November 20 episode of NXT. Taylor's recurring interactions with Dana Brooke often ended with Brooke patting her on the head in a condescending fashion, something that Brooke would later use as a taunt while wrestling. Taylor was also an in-ring competitor at NXT live events, participating mainly in Divas tag team matches.

On October 9, 2015, WWE officially announced that Fetkin was released from her contract, due to injury concerns hampering her training progress. Her release was featured on an episode of WWE Breaking Ground. Following her release, Fetkin had a short stint on the independent circuit, appearing as a backstage interviewer for Pacific Coast Wrestling (PCW).

== Other media ==
Fetkin is a former print model and has appeared in nationally televised commercial campaigns for NASCAR and Hewlett-Packard. In 2015, Fetkin appeared as a contestant in the nineteenth season of the ABC reality television show The Bachelor. She was eliminated in the first episode.

== Personal life ==
Fetkin had been working on her master's degree prior to her time in WWE, and she graduated from the University of Miami in July 2018. She would go on to complete her doctorate, graduating from the University of Southern California in May 2021.

Fetkin announced her engagement in December 2022, and married her husband in August 2023.
