= Kin Community =

Digital media and entertainment company

- Type: Online content
- Country: United States
- Availability: International
- Founded: Dec 2011
- Headquarters: Playa Vista, California
- Key people: Michael Wayne, CEO
- Official website: KinCommunity.com

Kin is a digital media and entertainment company.

== History ==
Kin Community was created by DECA in 2011 as part of YouTube's $100 million investment in their YouTube Original Channel Initiative. Kin Community failed to receive follow-on funding from YouTube and instead focussed on selling ads for their network partners, while continuing to create original content. In 2013, Kin Community partnered with Warner Bros. to represent The Ellen Show YouTube channel.

Kin Community partner, the Lizzie Bennet Diaries, became the first YouTube series to win a Primetime Emmy, receiving the 2013 Primetime Emmy Award for Outstanding Creative Achievement in Interactive Media-Original Interactive Program.

== Kin Studios ==
In July 2015, Kin Community announced that they had formed Kin Studios, a 20-person team dedicated to creating branded content for advertisers with Kin Community creators.

== See also ==
- Multi Channel Network
- List of multi-channel networks
- YouTube
- List of YouTube personalities
