= JoJo Fletcher =

American television personality (born 1990)

- Born: Joelle Hannah Fletcher; November 1, 1990 (age 35); Dallas, Texas, U.S.
- Education: Baylor University
- Known for: The Bachelorette; The Bachelor
- Spouse: Jordan Rodgers (m. 2022)
- Children: 1

Joelle Hannah Fletcher (born November 1, 1990) is an American television personality. She was a contestant on the 20th season of ABC's The Bachelor and the lead on the 12th season of The Bachelorette.

== Personal life ==
Fletcher was born in Dallas, Texas, the child of physician parents. Her mother is from Iran and her father was raised in Tennessee. Prior to going into real estate, Fletcher was a premedicine major at Baylor University. She is married to Jordan Rodgers. After a four-year engagement, the couple planned to wed on June 13, 2020, but due to the COVID-19 pandemic in the United States, they postponed their wedding. They were married on May 14, 2022. In August 28, 2025, Fletcher and her husband Rodgers announced they were expecting their rainbow baby together. On December 23, 2025, Fletcher gave birth to their daughter.

== Reality television shows ==
=== Ready for Love ===
Fletcher appeared in the first episode of Ready for Love, on which her half-brother, Ben Patton, was starring.

=== The Bachelor ===
Fletcher was a contestant on Ben Higgins' season of The Bachelor. Higgins confessed love for both Lauren Bushnell and her, but ultimately chose Bushnell in the finale.

=== The Bachelorette ===
Fletcher was announced as the Bachelorette on March 14, 2016, during After the Final Rose. In the end, Fletcher chose former pro-quarterback Jordan Rodgers over runner-up Robby Hayes. Rodgers proposed; the two were married on May 14, 2022. The couple currently resides in Dallas.

=== The Bachelor Winter Games ===
Fletcher appeared in one episode of The Bachelor Winter Games where she judged a kissing contest along with Rachel Lindsay and Arie Luyendyk.

== Career ==
In April 2018, Fletcher started working with Marcus by Goldman Sachs as a new ambassador for home improvement loans. Fletcher's appearances included interviews as a home-renovation expert.

In June 2018, Fletcher announced that she was launching her own clothing line, Fletch.

In September 2018, it was announced that Fletcher and her fiancé, Jordan Rodgers, would appear in a Kin web series Engaged with JoJo and Jordan, described as a combination of reality TV and DIY home decor.

Beginning in July 2019, Fletcher and Rodgers hosted the CNBC reality show Cash Pad. A combination of house flipping and investment shows, the hosts partner with homeowners hoping to turn their properties into ideal short-term rentals.

In September 2019, Fletcher and Rodgers announced they would be hosting Battle of the Fittest Couples for Paramount Network where “ripped couples” compete against each other to win the title "Fittest Couple" and a $100,000 cash prize. The show premiered October 15, 2019.

Fletcher and Rodgers hosted The Big D, a dating reality show for TBS that was set to premiere on July 7, 2022. However, the show was canceled on June 16, three weeks before the premiere. Ten episodes were produced.

In July 2022, as reported by People, JoJo Fletcher teamed up with the fashion brand Cupshe to introduce a collection of swimwear priced affordably.

| Preceded by Becca Tilley | The Bachelor runner up Season 20 | Succeeded by Raven Gates |
| Preceded by Kaitlyn Bristowe | The Bachelorette; Season 12 | Succeeded by Rachel Lindsay |
