= Chris Soules =

American reality television participant

- Born: November 6, 1981 (age 45); Arlington, Iowa, U.S.
- Education: Iowa State University
- Occupations: Farmer, reality-TV personality
- Known for: The Bachelorette season 10; The Bachelor season 19; Dancing with the Stars

Christopher Douglas Soules (born November 6, 1981) is an American reality television personality and farmer who starred in the nineteenth season of ABC's The Bachelor. He earned his role as the Bachelor by becoming a fan favorite during his time on the tenth season of The Bachelorette with Andi Dorfman, where he placed third. He has also appeared in Dancing with the Stars.

== Early life ==
Soules was born in Arlington, Iowa, and is the youngest child and only son of Gary and Linda Soules. He has three older sisters. Soules is a fourth-generation farmer. He learned how to drive a tractor before driving a car at a young age. At Starmont High School, Soules was involved in football, track, and the National FFA Organization. When he was a senior, the Starmont High football team was runner-up in the state championship. He graduated in 2000. Soules went on to graduate from Iowa State University with a major in Agricultural Studies.

== Television shows ==
=== The Bachelorette ===
Soules first appeared on Andi Dorfman's season of The Bachelorette. He finished in third place after he had confessed his love to Andi. Soules started slowly but soon became a major contender for Andi's heart when he received her first kiss of the season. The smooch happened in episode 2 during their one-on-one date at the Santa Anita Race Track. While enjoying the afternoon, Soules opened up to Andi about his history, admitting that he was previously engaged. He made it all the way to the hometown date in episode 8, introducing Andi to his life on the farm in Iowa. The couple rode his tractor and enjoyed a picnic in the fields while a plane flew over with a banner that read: "Chris Loves Andi". But despite their chemistry, Andi broke things off with Soules during the fantasy suite episode. During her final one-on-one with him before the finale, Andi admitted to him that she was struggling with the idea of living in Iowa and did not want him to have to make sacrifices for her. Soules told her he was falling in love with her, but Andi ended things, telling him the foundation in their relationship just wasn't there. He left after telling Andi that he appreciated and respected her.

=== The Bachelor ===
Soules became a fan favorite on The Bachelorette and he ended up as the Bachelor for season 19. In the first episode, it was revealed that he would have a total of 30 women to choose from, instead of the usual 25. Soules proposed to Whitney Bischoff in The Bachelor finale at his family's barn in near Lamont, Iowa. On May 28, 2015, the couple announced that they had called off their engagement.

=== Dancing with the Stars ===
Following The Bachelor, Soules became a contestant on the ABC reality show Dancing with the Stars; his partner was season 19 champion Witney Carson. Soules became the 12th and final celebrity to fill in the cast. At the midway of the competition, Soules suffered a calf injury during rehearsal on Disney week. Soules was eliminated on May 5, 2015 (week 8) and finished in 5th place.

=== Worst Cooks in America: Celebrity Edition ===
In September 2015, Soules appeared on Food Network's Worst Cooks in America: Celebrity Edition, where he was the third person eliminated from an original group of seven.

== Personal life ==
Soules resides in his hometown of Arlington where he spends his time farming his own land as well as helping his father. Prior to his reality television appearance, he dated his college sweetheart Sheena Schreck and went on to become engaged to her. However, they ended their relationship before walking down the aisle. Following his appearance on The Bachelor, he was engaged to 29-year-old Chicago, Illinois resident, Whitney Bischoff. The couple broke off their engagement shortly after their six-month anniversary.

In April 2017, Soules was arrested and charged with leaving the scene of a fatal traffic accident in Aurora, Iowa. He was charged with a class D felony for leaving the scene of an accident causing death. He was not charged with driving under the influence, although court documents obtained by People magazine revealed that he was allegedly in possession of alcoholic beverages and containers at the time of the crash, which occurred around 8 p.m. on Monday, April 24, 2017. His attorneys were hoping to avoid a trial since Soules is a "public figure" and an "unnecessary trial" could be "damaging". "If Mr. Soules is forced to proceed to trial and then appeal, there would be no way to undo the publicity and restore Mr. Soules to his original position," his lawyers stated, according to documents obtained by the Des Moines Register. "Addressing this questionable and fundamentally unfair charge, given these facts, prior to trial, better serves the interests of justice." On August 23, 2019 he was convicted after his guilty plea to leaving the scene of an accident. His penalty was two years' probation.

Preceded by Juan Pablo Galavis	The Bachelor; Season 19	Succeeded by Ben Higgins
