= Bachelor in Paradise (American TV series) season 5 =

Bachelor in Paradise
- Season 5
- No. of episodes: 11

Release
- Original network: ABC
- Original release: August 7 – September 11, 2018

Season chronology
- ← Previous; Season 4 Next → Season 6

The fifth season of Bachelor in Paradise premiered on August 7, 2018. Chris Harrison reprised his role from The Bachelor and The Bachelorette as the host of the show.

== Production ==
=== Casting ===
During the Women Tell All of the twenty-second season of The Bachelor, host Chris Harrison announced that Bekah Martinez was scheduled to be in Paradise for the upcoming season, but a few months later, she declined to join, due to having a boyfriend.

For the first time, it was announced past contestants from the international versions of The Bachelor franchise will join the cast similar to The Bachelor Winter Games and the Australian version.

On June 26, 2018, the cast of season 5 of Bachelor in Paradise was announced.

After Wills Reid was eliminated during week 7, it was announced that he would be joining the season 5 cast in Paradise.

It was announced that Colton Underwood will be joining the cast of season 5 in Paradise after he was eliminated during week 8 after the hometown dates.

Wells Adams returned as the bartender alongside Yuki Kimura from The Bachelor Japan and The Bachelor Winter Games.

=== The Bachelor ===
On Tuesday, September 4, 2018 it was revealed that Colton Underwood will be on season 23 of The Bachelor as the next bachelor. There was much speculation that second runner-up Jason Tartick would be the next bachelor and there were many posts on Twitter asking why Jason wasn't going to be the bachelor. It was the third top trending post on Twitter that day.

== Contestants ==
Name	Age	Residence	From	Arrived	Outcome
Chris Randone	30	Orlando, Florida	The Bachelorette – Becca	Week 1	Engaged
Krystal Nielson	30	San Diego, California	The Bachelor – Arie	Week 1	Engaged
Jordan Kimball	26	Crystal River, Florida	The Bachelorette – Becca	Week 1	Engaged
Jenna Cooper	29	Raleigh, North Carolina	The Bachelor – Arie	Week 2	Engaged
Kamil Nicalek	30	Monroe, New York	The Bachelorette – Becca	Week 3	Relationship
Annaliese Puccini	33	San Francisco, California	The Bachelor – Arie	Week 1	Relationship
Kevin Wendt	34	Waterloo, Ontario	The Bachelorette Canada – Jasmine; The Bachelor Winter Games	Week 1	Split Week 6
Astrid Loch	28	Tampa, Florida	The Bachelor – Nick	Week 1	Split Week 6
Jordan Mauger	34	Auckland, New Zealand	The Bachelor New Zealand; The Bachelor Winter Games	Week 4	Split Week 6
Cassandra Ferguson	26	Detroit, Michigan	The Bachelor — Juan Pablo; Bachelor in Paradise — Season 2	Week 4	Split Week 6
Robby Hayes	29	Los Angeles, California	The Bachelorette – JoJo; Bachelor in Paradise — Season 4	Week 5	Split Week 6
Shushanna Mkrtychyan	30	Salt Lake City, Utah	The Bachelor — Ben H. Bachelor in Paradise — Season 3	Week 4	Split Week 6
John Graham	28	San Francisco, California	The Bachelorette – Becca	Week 1	Split Week 6
Olivia Goethals	24	Chicago, Illinois	The Bachelor – Arie	Week 4	Split Week 6
Diggy Moreland	32	Chicago, Illinois	The Bachelorette – Rachel; Bachelor in Paradise — Season 4	Week 5	Week 5
Joe Amabile	32	Chicago, Illinois	The Bachelorette – Becca	Week 1	Split Week 5
Kendall Long	26	Los Angeles, California	The Bachelor – Arie	Week 1	Split Week 5
Eric Bigger	30	Baltimore, Maryland	The Bachelorette – Rachel; The Bachelor Winter Games	Week 1	Week 5 (Quit)
Angela Amezcua	28	Greenville, South Carolina	The Bachelor – Nick	Week 1	Week 4
Chelsea Roy	29	Portland, Maine	The Bachelor – Arie	Week 1	Week 4
Christen Whitney	26	Tulsa, Oklahoma	The Bachelor – Nick; Bachelor in Paradise — Season 4	Week 4	Week 4
Colton Underwood	26	Denver, Colorado	The Bachelorette – Becca	Week 1	Split Week 4
Tia Booth	26	Little Rock, Arkansas	The Bachelor – Arie	Week 1	Split Week 4
Benoit Beauséjour-Savard	31	Montreal, Quebec, Canada	The Bachelorette Canada – Jasmine; The Bachelor Winter Games	Week 3	Week 3
Connor Obrochta	25	St. Petersburg, Florida	The Bachelorette – Becca	Week 3	Week 3
David Ravitz	26	Boca Raton, Florida	The Bachelorette – Becca	Week 1	Week 3
Leo Dottavio	31	Los Angeles, California	The Bachelorette – Becca	Week 3	Week 3
Jubilee Sharpe	27	Miami, Florida	The Bachelor — Ben H. Bachelor in Paradise — Season 3	Week 2	Week 3 (Quit)
Kenny Layne	36	Las Vegas, Nevada	The Bachelorette – Rachel	Week 1	Week 3 (Quit)
Bibiana Julian	30	Miami, Florida	The Bachelor – Arie; The Bachelor Winter Games	Week 1	Week 2
Caroline Lunny	27	Fort Lauderdale, Florida	The Bachelor – Arie	Week 2	Week 2
D'Nysha "Nysha" Norris	30	Anderson, South Carolina	The Bachelor – Arie	Week 1	Week 2
Jacqueline Trumbull	27	New York, New York	The Bachelor – Arie	Week 2	Week 2
Wills Reid	29	Los Angeles, California	The Bachelorette – Becca	Week 1	Week 1
Nick Spetsas	27	Palm Coast, Florida	The Bachelorette – Becca	Week 1	Week 1

== Elimination table ==
Place	Contestant	Week					
Place	Contestant	1	2	3	4	5	6
1-6	Chris	Date	In	In	In	Date	Engaged
1-6	Krystal	Date	In	Date	In	Date	Engaged
1-6	Jordan K.	In	Date	In	In	Date	Engaged
1-6	Jenna	Wait	Date	Date	In	Date	Engaged
1-6	Kamil	Wait		Date	Date	In	Relationship
1-6	Annaliese	In	Last	Date	Last	In	Relationship
7-8	Kevin	In	In	In	Date	In	Split
7-8	Astrid	In	In	In	Date	In	Split
9-14	Jordan M.	Wait			In	Date	Split
9-14	Cassandra	Wait			Date	Date	Split
9-14	Robby	Wait				Date	Split
9-14	Shushanna	Wait			Date	Date	Split
9-14	John	In	Date	Last	Date	Last	Split
9-14	Olivia	Wait			Date	Date	Split
15	Diggy	Wait				Out	
16-17	Joe	In	In	In	In	Split	
16-17	Kendall	In	In	Date	In	Split	
18	Eric	In	In	Date	Date	Quit	
19-21	Angela	In	In	Date	Out		
19-21	Chelsea	In	In	In	Out		
19-21	Christen	Wait			Out		
22-23	Colton	Last	In	Date	Split		
22-23	Tia	Date	In	Date	Split		
24-26	Benoit	Wait		Out			
24-26	Connor	Wait		Out			
24-26	David	In	In	Out			
27	Leo	Wait		Out			
28	Jubilee	Wait	Date	Quit			
29	Kenny	Date	Date	Quit			
30-33	Bibiana	In	Out				
30-33	Caroline	Wait	Out				
30-33	Jacqueline	Wait	Out				
30-33	Nysha	In	Out				
34-35	Nick	Out					
34-35	Wills	Out					

=== Key ===
The contestant is male.
The contestant is female.
Date The contestant went on a date and gave out a rose at the rose ceremony.
Date The contestant went on a date and got a rose at the rose ceremony.
In The contestant gave or received a rose at the rose ceremony, thus remaining in the competition.
Last The contestant received the last rose.
Last The contestant went on a date and received the last rose.
Out The contestant went on a date and was eliminated.
Out The contestant was eliminated.
Out The contestant went on a date and was eliminated.
Quit The contestant voluntarily left the show.
Split The couple had a date, then broke up and were eliminated.
Stay The couple decided to stay together and won the competition.
Wait The contestant had to wait before appearing in paradise.
Split/Stay The contestant split, but later got back together.

== Episodes ==
No. overall	No. in season	Title	Original release date	Prod. code	U.S. viewers (millions)	Rating/share (18–49)
40	1	"Week 1: Season Premiere"	August 7, 2018	501	3.82	1.1/5
Arrivals: Tia, Eric, Kendall, Jordan, Bibiana, Joe, Wills, Chelsea, Chris, Krystal, Kevin, Nick, John, Nysha, Angela, Kenny, Astrid, Annaliese, David. Date Card: Tia; Tia's Date: Chris; Arrival: Colton; Colton's Date: Tia
41	2	"Week 2: Part 1"	August 13, 2018	502A	4.54	1.3/6
Date Card: Kenny; Kenny's Date: Krystal; Rose Ceremony: Krystal gave her rose to Kenny, Astrid gave her rose to Kevin, Tia gave her rose to Chris, Kendall gave her rose to Joe, Annaliese gave her rose to Jordan, Nysha gave her rose to Eric, Chelsea gave her rose to David, Angela gave her rose to John, Bibiana gave her rose to Colton. Nick and Wills did not receive a rose and were sent home. Becca Kufrin arrives to talk to the girls.
42	3	"Week 2: Part 2"	August 14, 2018	502B	3.93	1.0/5
Arrival: Jenna; Jenna's Date: Jordan; Arrival: Caroline; Caroline's Date: John; Arrival: Jubilee; Jubilee's Date: John
43	4	"Week 3: Part 1"	August 20, 2018	503A	4.60	1.3/6
44	5	"Week 3: Part 2"	August 21, 2018	503B	3.97	1.1/5
45	6	"Week 4: Part 1"	August 27, 2018	504A	4.61	1.2/6
46	7	"Week 4: Part 2"	August 28, 2018	504B	4.16	1.1/5
Leo arrives and takes Kendall on a date. He kisses Chelsea and argues with Kevin about it. At night, Leo sarcastically wishes Kendall good luck with Joe, whom he called "Grocery Store Bitch". Leo then leaves the party, but Joe demands that he say that to his face. Leo then spills his drink on Joe, and producers attempt to break the incoming fight. At the rose ceremony, Benoit, Connor, and David do not receive roses and are eliminated.
47	8	"Week 5: Part 1"	September 3, 2018	505A	4.20	1.1/5
Colton broke up with Tia and left paradise, causing Tia to also leave. Angela, Chelsea, and Christen do not receive roses and are eliminated.
48	9	"Week 5: Part 2"	September 4, 2018	505B	3.93	1.0/4
49	10	"Week 6: Part 1"	September 10, 2018	506A	4.23	1.1/5
50	11	"Week 6: Part 2 (Season Finale)"	September 11, 2018	506B	4.55	1.2/5
After Fantasy Suite date night. The three remaining couples must decide if they will stay together or break up. Annalise and Kamil confess their feelings for one another both state that they love each over. Kamil, however is not ready to propose and wants to continue their relationship outside of Paradise. The next couple to make the decision are Jordan and Jenna. Both confirm their love for each other, and Jordan proposes to Jenna who happily accepts. Chris and Krystal are the final couple, Chris proposes to Krystal. During the taping of the reunion Kamil breaks up with Annalise on stage. Everyone on the cast turns on Kamil. Joe and Kendall have also reunited after splitting during a cocktail party. Astrid and Kevin have gotten back together as well. Jordan and Jenna appear happy and engaged and ask Chris Harrison to officiate their wedding. News later broke that supposedly Jenna cheated on Jordan before and after Paradise; Jordan has since "removed himself from the relationship" effectively ending their engagement. Chris and Krystal are still together and planning on moving in together and planning their wedding.
