= Higher Learning (disambiguation) =

Higher Learning is a 1995 drama film.

Higher Learning may also refer to:

== Media ==
- Higher Learning (podcast), podcast hosted by Van Lathan and Rachel Lindsay
- Higher Learning (soundtrack), the soundtrack to the 1995 film
- "Higher Learning," a song on Sam Roberts's 2003 album We Were Born in a Flame
- "Higher Learning", a song on Patti Smith's compilation album Land (1975–2002)

== Education ==
- Higher learning, a synonym for higher education
