= Judge Lindsay =

Judge Lindsay may refer to:

- Reginald C. Lindsay (1945–2009), judge of the United States District Court for the District of Massachusetts
- Sam A. Lindsay (born 1951), judge of the United States District Court for the Northern District of Texas

== See also ==
- Judge Lindsey (disambiguation)
