= Sam A. Lindsay =

American judge (born 1951)

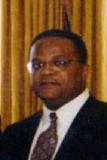

Judge of the United States District Court for the Northern District of Texas
- Incumbent
- Assumed office March 17, 1998
- Appointed by: Bill Clinton
- Preceded by: Seat established by 104 Stat. 5089

Personal details
- Born: Sam Allen Lindsay; October 16, 1951 (age 75) San Antonio, Texas, U.S.
- Spouse: Kathy Lindsay
- Children: 3, including Rachel Lindsay
- Education: St. Mary's University (BA); University of Texas (JD)

Sam Allen Lindsay (born October 16, 1951) is an American attorney who serves as a United States district judge of the United States District Court for the Northern District of Texas, with chambers in Dallas, Texas.

== Early life and education ==
Lindsay was born in San Antonio, Texas and raised in South Texas. He received his Bachelor of Arts degree in History and Government from St. Mary’s University in 1974, graduating magna cum laude. In 1977, he earned his Juris Doctor from the University of Texas School of Law in Austin.

== Career ==
After graduating from law school, Lindsay served as a staff attorney for the Texas Aeronautics Commission from 1977 to 1979. In 1979, he joined the Dallas City Attorney's office, where he progressed through various posts until being named City Attorney in 1992. He was the head of the Federal Litigation Section from 1979 to 1986, a Chief of litigation division/executive assistant city attorney from 1986 to 1990, a first assistant city attorney from 1990 to 1991, an Acting city attorney in 1991, and finally a City Attorney from 1992 to 1998.

=== Federal judicial service ===
On November 8, 1997, Lindsay was nominated by President Bill Clinton to be a United States District Judge of the United States District Court for the Northern District of Texas, to a new seat created by 104 Stat. 5089. He was unanimously confirmed by the United States Senate on March 11, 1998, and received commission on March 17, 1998. Lindsay was the first African American to serve on the federal District Court in Dallas.

=== Notable cases ===
- In October 2006 Lindsay presided over the case against InfoCom Corporation.
- On May 21, 2007, Lindsay issued an order blocking enforcement of an ordinance approved by the citizens of Farmers Branch, Texas. The ordinance would have authorized fines against property managers who rented to illegal immigrants.
- On January 22, 2015, Lindsay sentenced journalist Barrett Brown for his role in a December 2011 Anonymous hack of Texas-based Stratfor. Brown pleaded guilty to accessory after the fact, interfering with an FBI investigation, and threatening an FBI agent. At the time of sentencing, he had been in jail about 2.5 years. Lindsay sentenced Brown to a total of 63 months in jail and fined him almost $1 million, with the money to be paid to Stratfor and other companies targeted by Anonymous. Jeremy Hammond, who was responsible for the Stratfor breach, pleaded guilty to one count, illegally accessing computer systems. In 2013, Judge Loretta Preska, sentenced Hammond to 10 years, the maximum allowed; news reports make no mention of Preska imposing a fine.

== Personal life ==
Lindsay's daughter, Rachel Lindsay, is an attorney and television personality who first appeared as a contestant on The Bachelor, coming in third place. On February 13, 2017, ABC announced that she would be the bachelorette on the next season of The Bachelorette, becoming the first African-American lead in the history of the franchise.

Lindsay is a Trustee of The Center for American and International Law. CAIL trains law enforcement officers, including FBI personnel.

== See also ==
- List of African-American federal judges
- List of African-American jurists
- List of first minority male lawyers and judges in Texas

Legal offices
Preceded by Seat established by 104 Stat. 5089	Judge of the United States District Court for the Northern District of Texas; 1998–present	Incumbent
