= Bachelor in Paradise (American TV series) season 4 =

Season of television series

Bachelor in Paradise
- Season 4
- Promotional poster
- No. of episodes: 9

Release
- Original network: ABC
- Original release: August 14 – September 11, 2017

Season chronology
- ← Previous; Season 3 Next → Season 5

The fourth season of Bachelor in Paradise premiered on August 14, 2017. Chris Harrison reprises his role from The Bachelor and The Bachelorette as the host of the show.

== Production ==
As with the previous season, filming took place in the town of Sayulita, located in Vallarta-Nayarit, Mexico.

=== Misconduct allegations ===
On June 11, 2017, production was suspended indefinitely due to alleged misconduct. It was reported that production allegedly filmed cast member DeMario Jackson in a sexual encounter with Corinne Olympios, who may have been too drunk to consent. Warner Bros. released a statement saying:

We have become aware of allegations of misconduct on the set of Bachelor in Paradise in Mexico. We have suspended production and we are conducting a thorough investigation of these allegations. Once the investigation is complete, we will take appropriate responsive action.

On June 20, 2017, it was announced that Warner Bros. has cleared the show and its producers of any misconduct as they found no evidence of misconduct. It was also confirmed that filming will resume. Warner Bros. released a statement saying:

As we previously stated, we recently became aware of allegations regarding an incident on the set of Bachelor in Paradise in Mexico. We take all such allegations seriously. The safety, security and well-being of the cast and crew is our number one concern, and we suspended filming so that the allegations could be investigated immediately and thoroughly. Our internal investigation, conducted with the assistance of an outside law firm, has now been completed. Out of respect for the privacy interests of those involved, we do not intend to release the videotape of the incident. We can say, however, that the tape does not support any charge of misconduct by a cast member. Nor does the tape show, contrary to many press reports, that the safety of any cast member was ever in jeopardy. Production on this season of Bachelor in Paradise will be resuming, and we plan to implement certain changes to the show’s policies and procedures to enhance and further ensure the safety and security of all participants.

While neither Corinne Olympios nor DeMario Jackson returned to filming post-scandal, they still appeared in this season from footage shot before the scandal halted production, and appeared separately and together in live studio interviews with host Chris Harrison. Olympios told Harrison that she drank while taking a medication that is not supposed to be mixed with alcohol, causing her to become "imbalanced" and "mentally checked out," but with "no way" for anyone around her to know that was the case.

=== Casting ===
During After the Final Rose, Nick Viall's runner-up, Raven Gates, accepted an offer to join this season. Some of the cast was announced on June 6, 2017. After Dean Unglert was eliminated during hometown week, it was announced that he would be joining the season 4 cast in Paradise.

Wells Adams of The Bachelorette season 12 became the show's new bartender, replacing Jorge Moreno.

== Contestants ==
Name	Age	Residence	From	Arrived	Outcome
Derek Peth	30	Fort Lauderdale, Florida	The Bachelorette – JoJo	Week 1	Engaged
Taylor Nolan	23	Seattle, Washington	The Bachelor – Nick	Week 1	Engaged
Adam Gottschalk	27	Dallas, Texas	The Bachelorette – Rachel	Week 1	Relationship
Raven Gates	25	Hoxie, Arkansas	The Bachelor – Nick	Week 1	Relationship
Daniel Maguire	32	Vancouver, British Columbia	The Bachelorette – JoJo; Bachelor in Paradise – Season 3	Week 2	Relationship
Lacey Mark	25	New York City, New York	The Bachelor – Nick	Week 1 (Note: Lacey entered the competition in Week 1, however, she had learned that her grandfather had died and initially left the competition to be with her family prior to the shutdown.)	Relationship
Robby Hayes	28	Los Angeles, California	The Bachelorette – JoJo	Week 1	Split Week 4
Amanda Stanton	27	Laguna Beach, California	The Bachelor – Ben H. Bachelor in Paradise – Season 3	Week 1	Split Week 4
Dean Unglert	26	Santa Monica, California	The Bachelorette – Rachel	Week 1	Split Week 4
Danielle Lombard	28	Los Angeles, California	The Bachelor – Nick	Week 2	Split Week 4
Jonathan Treece	31	New Smyrna Beach, Florida	The Bachelorette – Rachel	Week 3	Split Week 4
Jasmine Goode	30	Los Angeles, California	The Bachelor – Nick	Week 1	Split Week 4
Jack Stone	32	Dallas, Texas	The Bachelorette – Rachel	Week 1	Split Week 4
Christen Whitney	25	Tulsa, Oklahoma	The Bachelor – Nick	Week 2	Split Week 4
Dominique Alexis	26	Los Angeles, California	The Bachelor – Nick	Week 2	Week 4 (Quit)
Jaimi King	28	New Orleans, Louisiana	The Bachelor – Nick	Week 4	Week 4 (Quit)
Diggy Moreland	31	Chicago, Illinois	The Bachelorette – Rachel	Week 1	Week 4 (Quit)
Emily Ferguson	24	Las Vegas, Nevada	The Bachelor – Ben H. Bachelor in Paradise – Season 3	Week 4	Week 4 (Quit)
Haley Ferguson	24	Las Vegas, Nevada	The Bachelor – Ben H. Bachelor in Paradise – Season 3	Week 4	Week 4 (Quit)
Blake Elarbee	31	Los Angeles, California	The Bachelorette – Rachel	Week 3	Week 3
Fred Johnson	27	Los Angeles, California	The Bachelorette – Rachel	Week 3	Week 3
Kristina Schulman	25	Lexington, Kentucky	The Bachelor – Nick	Week 1	Week 3 (Quit)
Ben Zorn	28	San Diego, California	The Bachelorette – Kaitlyn	Week 1	Week 3 (Quit)
Alexis Waters	24	Miami, Florida	The Bachelor – Nick	Week 1	Week 2
Sarah Vendal	27	Newport Beach, California	The Bachelor – Nick	Week 2	Week 2
Matt Munson	32	New Haven, Connecticut	The Bachelorette – Rachel	Week 1	Week 2 (Quit)
Danielle Maltby	31	Nashville, Tennessee	The Bachelor – Nick	Week 1	Week 2 (Quit)
Alex Woytkiw	26	Del Mar, California	The Bachelorette – JoJo	Week 1	Week 1
Iggy Rodriguez	30	Chicago, Illinois	The Bachelorette – Rachel	Week 1	Week 1
Nick Benvenutti	35	Fort Lauderdale, Florida	The Bachelorette – JoJo	Week 1	Week 1
Vinny Ventiera	29	Delray Beach, Florida	The Bachelorette – JoJo; Bachelor in Paradise – Season 3	Week 1	Week 1
DeMario Jackson	30	Los Angeles, California	The Bachelorette – Rachel	Week 1	Week 1 (DQ)
Corinne Olympios	25	Miami, Florida	The Bachelor – Nick	Week 1	Week 1 (DQ)

== Elimination table ==
Place	Contestant	Week			
Place	Contestant	1	2	3	4
1-4	Derek	Date	In	In	Engaged
1-4	Taylor	Date	In	In	Engaged
1-4	Adam	Date	Date	In	Relationship
1-4	Raven	Date	In	In	Relationship
5-6	Daniel	Wait	In	Date	Relationship
5-6	Lacey	Quit	Date	Date	Relationship
7-17	Robby	Last	In	Date	Split
7-17	Amanda	In	In	Date	Split
7-17	Dean	Date	Date	Last	Split
7-17	Danielle L.	Wait	Last	In	Split
7-17	Jonathan	Wait		Date	Split
7-17	Jasmine	Date	In	In	Split
7-17	Jack	In	In	In	Split
7-17	Christen	Wait	Date	Date	Split
7-17	Dominique	Wait	Date	Date	Quit
7-17	Jaimi	Wait			Quit
7-17	Diggy	In	Date	In	Quit
18-19	Emily	Wait			Quit
18-19	Haley	Wait			Quit
20-21	Blake	Wait		Out	
20-21	Fred	Wait		Out	
22	Kristina	Date	In	Quit	
23	Ben	In	In	Quit	
24-25	Alexis	In	Out		
24-25	Sarah	Wait	Out		
26	Matt	Date	Quit		
27	Danielle M.	In	Quit		
28-31	Alex	Out			
28-31	Iggy	Out			
28-31	Nick	Out			
28-31	Vinny	Out			
32-33	Corinne	Out			
32-33	DeMario	Out			

=== Key ===
The contestant is male.
The contestant is female.
Date The contestant went on a date and gave out a rose at the rose ceremony.
Date The contestant went on a date and got a rose at the rose ceremony.
In The contestant gave or received a rose at the rose ceremony, thus remaining in the competition.
Last The contestant received the last rose.
Last The contestant went on a date and received the last rose.
Out The contestant went on a date and was eliminated.
Out The contestant was eliminated.
Kicked Off The contestant was not allowed to return to Paradise when filming resumed.
Quit The contestant had a date and voluntarily left the show.
Quit The contestant voluntarily left the show.
Quit The contestant left paradise before the shutdown, but came back when filming resumed and gave out a rose.
Split The couple broke up and were eliminated.
Split The contestant split after Bachelor in Paradise ended.
Stay The couple decided to stay together and won the competition.
Wait The contestant had to wait before appearing in paradise

== Episodes ==
No. overall	No. in season	Title	Original release date	Prod. code	U.S. viewers (millions)	Rating/share (18–49)
31	1	"Week 1: Season Premiere"	August 14, 2017	401A	5.09	1.6/6
32	2	"Week 1: Part 2"	August 15, 2017	401B	3.88	1.1/4
33	3	"Week 2: Part 1"	August 21, 2017	402A	4.33	1.3/5
34	4	"Week 2: Part 2"	August 22, 2017	402B	3.80	1.1/4
35	5	"Week 3: Part 1"	August 28, 2017	403A	5.45	1.7/6
36	6	"Week 3: Part 2"	August 29, 2017	403B	4.36	1.3/5
37	7	"Week 4: Part 1"	September 4, 2017	404A	4.51	1.3/5
38	8	"Week 4: Part 2"	September 5, 2017	404B	4.54	1.3/5
39	9	"Week 5: Season Finale"	September 11, 2017	405A	4.70	1.3/5
