= The Bachelorette (American TV series) season 13 =

Season of television series

The Bachelorette
- Season 13
- Promotional poster
- Starring: Rachel Lindsay
- Presented by: Chris Harrison
- No. of contestants: 31
- Winner: Bryan Abasolo
- Runner-up: Peter Kraus
- No. of episodes: 11

Release
- Original network: ABC
- Original release: May 22 – August 7, 2017

Additional information
- Filming dates: March 16 – May 11, 2017

Season chronology
- ← Previous; Season 12 Next → Season 14

The thirteenth season of The Bachelorette premiered on May 22, 2017. This season featured Rachel Lindsay, a 32-year-old attorney from Dallas, Texas.

Lindsay attended the University of Texas at Austin where she graduated with a bachelor's degree in 2007 and Marquette University Law School where she graduated with a Juris Doctor in 2011. She finished in third place on season 21 of The Bachelor featuring Nick Viall. Lindsay is the first African-American in the lead role in the history of the Bachelor franchise.

The season concluded on August 7, 2017, with Lindsay accepting a proposal from 37-year-old chiropractor Bryan Abasolo. They married on August 24, 2019, and currently live in Los Angeles, California. On January 2, 2024 Bryan Abasolo filed for divorce after four years, citing "irreconcilable differences."

== Production ==
=== Casting and contestants ===
Casting began during season twelve of The Bachelorette. Lindsay was named as the bachelorette on February 13, 2017, during the telecast of Jimmy Kimmel Live!.

Lindsay then appeared in the live season finale of season 21 on The Bachelor, she met the first four contestants, Dean, Eric, Blake E., and DeMario.

Notable cast includes pro wrestler Kenny Layne.

=== Filming and development ===
Filming began on March 16, 2017, shortly after the conclusion of the twenty-first season of The Bachelor. Destinations for this season were South Carolina, Norway, Denmark, Switzerland and Spain, with appearances including actors Mila Kunis and Ashton Kutcher, former NBA player Kareem Abdul-Jabbar, actress and television host Ellen DeGeneres and country singer Russell Dickerson.

== Contestants ==
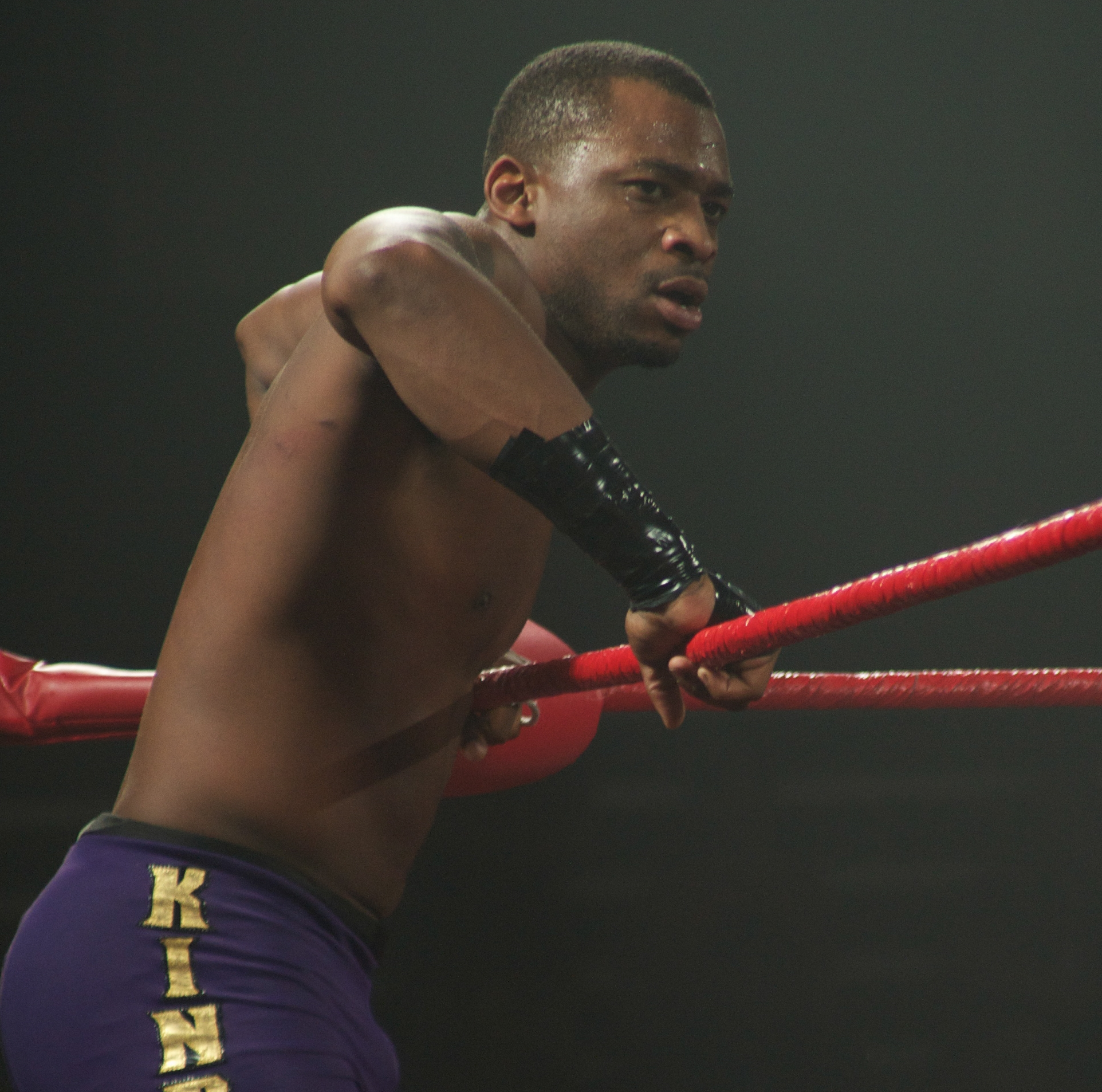
Kenny Layne

The first 4 contestants were revealed in The Bachelor season finale on March 13, 2017. The full cast of 31 contestants were later revealed on May 17.

Name	Age	Hometown	Occupation	Outcome	Place	Ref
Bryan Abasolo	37	Miami, Florida	Chiropractor	Winner	1	
Peter Kraus	31	Cottage Grove, Wisconsin	Business Owner	Runner-Up	2	
Eric Bigger	29	Baltimore, Maryland	Personal Trainer	Week 9	3	
Dean Unglert	26	Basalt, Colorado	Startup Recruiter	Week 8	4	
Adam Gottschalk	27	Dallas, Texas	Real Estate Agent	Week 7	5	
Matt Munson	32	Meriden, Connecticut	Construction Sales Rep	Week 7	6	
Alex Bordyukov	28	Grosse Pointe, Michigan	Information Systems Supervisor	Week 6	7	
Will Gaskins	28	White Plains, New York	Sales Manager	Week 6	8	
Kenny Layne	35	Orlando, Florida	Professional Wrestler	Week 6	9	
Anthony Battle	26	Dolton, Illinois	Education Software Manager	Week 5	10–11	
Josiah Graham	28	Plantation, Florida	Prosecuting Attorney	Week 5	10–11	
Lee Garrett	30	Jacksonville, Florida	Singer/Songwriter	Week 5	12	
Ignacio "Iggy" Rodriguez	30	Pasadena, California	Consulting Firm CEO	Week 4	13–14	
Jonathan Treece	31	Paragould, Arkansas	Tickle Monster	Week 4	13–14	
Jack Stone	32	Dallas, Texas	Attorney	Week 4	15	
Brady Ervin	29	Eden Prairie, Minnesota	Male Model	Week 3	16–18	
Bryce Powers	30	Orlando, Florida	Firefighter	Week 3	16–18	
Kenneth "Diggy" Moreland	31	Naperville, Illinois	Senior Inventory Analyst	Week 3	16–18	
Fred Johnson	27	Dallas, Texas	Executive Assistant	Week 3	19	
Blake Elarbee	31	Marina del Rey, California	Aspiring Drummer	Week 2	20–22	
Jamey Kocan	32	Santa Monica, California	Sales Account Executive	Week 2	20–22	
Lucas Yancey	30	Woodside, California	Whaboom	Week 2	20–22	
DeMario Jackson	30	Century City, California	Executive Recruiter	Week 2	23	
Blake Killpack	29	Oahu, Hawaii	U.S. Marine Veteran	Week 1	24–31	
Grant Hubsher	29	Palm Harbor, Florida	Emergency Medicine Physician	Week 1	24–31	
Jedidiah Ballard	35	Augusta, Georgia	ER Physician	Week 1	24–31	
Kyle Sherwood	26	Stratford, Connecticut	Marketing Consultant	Week 1	24–31	
Michael Black	26	Chicago, Illinois	Former Professional Basketball Player	Week 1	24–31	
Milton LaCroix	31	North Bay Village, Florida	Hotel Recreation Supervisor	Week 1	24–31	
Mohit Sehgal	26	Pacifica, California	Product Manager	Week 1	24–31	
Rob Howard	30	Calgary, Alberta	Law Student	Week 1	24–31	

=== Future appearances ===
==== Bachelor in Paradise ====
Season 4

DeMario Jackson was set to appear in season 4 of Bachelor in Paradise. When production restarted after the misconduct allegations had halted production, Jackson did not return for filming. Dean Unglert, Diggy Moreland, Matt Munson, Iggy Rodriguez, Jack Stone, Jonathan Treece, Fred Johnson, Blake Elarbee, and Adam Gottschalk also returned for season 4. When production restarted, Rodriguez was eliminated in week 1. Munson quit in week 2. Elarbee and Johnson were eliminated in week 3. Unglert, Moreland, Stone, and Treece all quit in week 4. Gottschalk left Paradise in a relationship with Raven Gates.

Season 5

Moreland, Eric Bigger, and Kenny Layne returned for season 5 of Bachelor in Paradise. Layne quit in week 3. Bigger quit in week 5. Moreland was eliminated in week 5.

Season 6

Unglert returned for season 6 of Bachelor in Paradise. He quit in week 3, but returned in week 5 to ask Caelynn Miller-Keyes to leave with him.

Season 8

Alex Bordyukov returned for season 8 of Bachelor in Paradise. He was eliminated in week 4.

==== Bachelor in Paradise Australia ====
Season 2

Bordyukov appeared on the second season of Bachelor in Paradise Australia. He left the show in week 7 to pursue a relationship with fellow US contestant, Caroline Lunny, who was also competing on that season. However, the pair are no longer together.

==== Bachelor in Paradise Canada ====
Season 1

Bordyukov returned for the inaugural season of Bachelor in Paradise Canada. He split from Kit Blaiklock in week 5.

==== The Bachelor Winter Games ====
Unglert, Bigger, Jamey Kocan, and Josiah Graham returned for The Bachelor Winter Games to compete in Team USA. Bigger and Kocan were eliminated in week 1, Graham was eliminated in week 3, and Unglert was eliminated in week 4.

== Call-out order ==
Order	Bachelors	Week									
Order	Bachelors	1	2	3	4	5	6	7	8	9	10
1	Peter	Bryan	Dean	Alex	Dean	Bryan	Eric	Bryan	Bryan	Bryan	Bryan
2	Josiah	Peter	Peter	Anthony	Bryan	Will	Peter	Dean	Eric	Peter	Peter
3	Bryan	Will	Josiah	Eric	Eric	Kenny	Bryan	Peter	Peter	Eric	
4	Kenny	Jack	Bryan	Will	Peter	Dean	Matt	Eric	Dean		
5	Rob	Jamey	Bryce	Dean	Adam	Eric	Dean	Adam			
6	Iggy	Diggy	Eric	Jonathan	Will	Peter	Adam	Matt			
7	Bryce	Eric	Anthony	Peter	Matt	Alex	Alex				
8	Will	DeMario	Will	Adam	Alex	Adam	Will				
9	Diggy	Jonathan	Jonathan	Bryan	Josiah	Matt	Kenny				
10	Kyle	Bryce	Jack	Matt	Anthony	Anthony; Josiah					
11	Blake K.	Alex	Matt	Josiah	Kenny	Anthony; Josiah					
12	Brady	Kenny	Alex	Jack	Lee	Lee					
13	Dean	Dean	Adam	Iggy	Iggy; Jonathan						
14	Eric	Matt	Kenny	Kenny	Iggy; Jonathan						
15	DeMario	Anthony	Brady	Lee	Jack						
16	Blake E.	Brady	Lee	Brady; Bryce; Diggy							
17	Fred	Josiah	Iggy	Brady; Bryce; Diggy							
18	Jonathan	Lee	Fred	Brady; Bryce; Diggy							
19	Lee	Diggy	Diggy	Fred							
20	Alex	Fred	Blake E. Jamey; Lucas								
21	Milton	Adam	Blake E. Jamey; Lucas								
22	Adam	Blake E.	Blake E. Jamey; Lucas								
23	Matt	Lucas	DeMario								
24	Grant	Blake K. Grant; Jedidiah; Kyle; Michael; Milton; Mohit; Rob									
25	Anthony	Blake K. Grant; Jedidiah; Kyle; Michael; Milton; Mohit; Rob									
26	Jamey	Blake K. Grant; Jedidiah; Kyle; Michael; Milton; Mohit; Rob									
27	Jack	Blake K. Grant; Jedidiah; Kyle; Michael; Milton; Mohit; Rob									
28	Mohit	Blake K. Grant; Jedidiah; Kyle; Michael; Milton; Mohit; Rob									
29	Jedidiah	Blake K. Grant; Jedidiah; Kyle; Michael; Milton; Mohit; Rob									
30	Michael	Blake K. Grant; Jedidiah; Kyle; Michael; Milton; Mohit; Rob									
31	Lucas	Blake K. Grant; Jedidiah; Kyle; Michael; Milton; Mohit; Rob									

The contestant received the first impression rose
The contestant received a rose during a date
The contestant was eliminated
The contestant was eliminated during a date
The contestant was eliminated outside the rose ceremony
The contestant was disqualified from the competition
The contestant won the competition

== Episodes ==
No. overall	No. in season	Title	Original release date	Prod. code	U.S. viewers (millions)	Rating/share (18–49)
135	1	"Week 1: Season Premiere"	May 22, 2017	1301	5.66	1.8/6
This season begins with Rachel and her dog, Copper arrived at the Westlake Village Inn in Westlake Village. Then, Rachel met up with her fellow The Bachelor contestants from the recently concluded season: Raven Gates, Alexis Waters, Kristina Schulman, Astrid Loch, Whitney Fransway, Jasmine Goode, and Corinne Olympios at the mansion and gave their advice for her. Later that night, Rachel greets the thirty-one men as the limos arrived. Bryan spoke in Spanish, calling himself "trouble," and kissed her during the cocktail party; Bryce wore his firefighter uniform and literally swept Rachel off her feet; a group of RCC Marching Tigers band came at the mansion as Blake E. seen playing drums; Fred recognized Rachel and attended the same school holding a school yearbook, Jonathan tickled over Rachel's body; Lee serenaded Rachel with his guitar; Alex hold a vacuum cleaner has reached out through the mansion; Matt wore a penguin costume; Adam brought along his doll, "Adam Jr."; Grant pulled up in an ambulance with sirens sounding; Michael brought brownies and said "the blacker the brownie the sweeter the dude", and Lucas was boisterous and comedic, showcasing his catchphrase, "Whaboom!" Bryan received the first impression rose. At the rose ceremony, Blake K., Grant, Jedidiah, Kyle, Michael, Milton, Mohit, and Rob were eliminated.
136	2	"Week 2"	May 29, 2017	1302	5.68	1.5/6
Dean, Jack Stone, Jonathan, Blake E., Iggy, Kenny, Fred and Lucas were chosen for the first group date of the season, they traveled to a park to compete in a domestic-themed obstacle course to identify "husband material," hosted by franchise fans Ashton Kutcher and Mila Kunis with four obstacle challenges (changing baby diapers, wearing Babybjörn apparel, clogging sink and running with a vacuum cleaner). Lucas won, and used his time alone with Rachel to read her a poem. Lucas and Blake E. have been acquainted and known together prior to the show. In the end, Dean received the group-date rose. Peter received the first one-on-one date of this season with Rachel; they flew with Rachel's dog Copper to Palm Springs to attend BarkFest by BarkBox. Rachel gave Peter a rose at dinner, and they kissed during a fireworks display. For the second group date, Will, Jamey, Diggy, Alex, Adam, Lee, Matt, Eric, Josiah and DeMario arrive at the gymnasium and were split into two teams of five to play basketball for Kareem Abdul-Jabbar and a public audience. After the game, a woman named Lexi claimed to have been DeMario's girlfriend, whom he ghosted to become a Bachelorette contestant, which would indicate DeMario lied on his application. Rachel asked DeMario to join the conversation that he claimed the relationship with Lexi wasn't serious and that he did break things off, but Rachel decided that DeMario was not being honest and he is disqualified from the competition. The date continued with an after party, where Rachel gave Josiah the group-date rose. Lucas and Blake E. were both criticized each other to Rachel during the cocktail party. Bryan massaged Rachel, demonstrating spinal adjustment techniques. DeMario arrived at the mansion and asked to speak with Rachel.
137	3	"Week 3"	June 5, 2017	1303	6.04	1.7/6
Concluded from the previous episode, Rachel talked to DeMario outside the mansion, after heard more confrontation DeMario instructed to leave. At the rose ceremony, Blake E, Jamey, and Lucas were eliminated and then Blake E. and Lucas started their rivalry caused to feud against each other. The first group date involved Bryan, Jonathan, Peter, Alex, Will and Fred to take part for The Ellen DeGeneres Show where they danced shirtless for the audience and played "Never Have I Ever". Fred kissed Rachel during the date she admitted that she still thinks of him as a little boy that she wanted to give him a rose but he was eliminated. In the end, Alex received the rose. Anthony received the one-on-one date and had gone horseback riding at Rodeo Drive in Beverly Hills, she gave him a rose before they kissed and slow danced. Rachel's fellow The Bachelor co-contestants (Alexis Waters, Raven Gates, Jasmine Goode and Corinne Olympios) on the second group date for Brady, Dean, Adam, Kenny, Bryce, Lee, Jack Stone and Eric. The men danced on the stripper pole of a party bus and then had to mud wrestle each other at Cowboy Palace Saloon, Bryce defeated Kenny in the final round. Eric received the group-date rose. At the cocktail party, tensions ran high because Bryce and Lee had spoken against Eric to Rachel's friends during the group date, and the week ends in another cliffhanger.
138	4	"Week 4: Hilton Head, South Carolina"	June 19, 2017 (Note: The episode was originally scheduled to air on June 12, 2017, but ABC preempted it due to the ongoing of game 5 of the 2017 NBA Finals.)	1304	5.90	1.6/6
Concluded from previous episode as the cocktail party continues, Lee stirs up more drama with the other contestants, especially Kenny. During Rachel and Kenny's one-on-one time, Lee interrupts twice and angered Kenny. Then, Kenny and Lee later get into a loud argument, which Rachel overhears. Rachel becomes frustrated by the drama overshadowing her time with the men, but continues to the rose ceremony where Brady, Bryce, and Diggy are eliminated. The remaining contestants go to Hilton Head Island in South Carolina, where Dean is selected for a one-on-one date. Rachel and Dean enjoy a picnic on a park and take a ride on Goodyear Blimp to get an overview of Hilton Head Island. At dinner, Dean opens up about his family about his mother had died when he was a teenager and receives a rose from Rachel. Alex, Anthony, Peter, Bryan, Jonathan, Adam, Matt, Kenny, Lee, Iggy, Eric, Will and Josiah are chosen for the group date, the men and Rachel go on a booze cruise and then they later participate in a spelling bee, Chris called Rachel to be the fourth judge alongside three youngsters. Josiah emerging as the winner, outlasted Will. Later that evening, Iggy warns Rachel about Josiah on his attitude. Lee tells Rachel about the fight with Kenny and she later confronts Kenny about Lee's words. After his time with Rachel, Kenny pulls Lee aside to speak. The episode ends in another cliffhanger.
139	5	"Week 5: Norway"	June 26, 2017 (Note: The episode was originally scheduled to air on June 19, 2017, but having been preempted on the previous episode schedule of June 19.)	1305	5.39	1.4/6
Concluded from the previous episode, Kenny and Lee get into another argument and at the end of the group date, Bryan receives the rose. Jack Stone gets a one-on-one date at Bluffton where they have to shuck clams, go dancing with locals and walk around the city. At dinner, Rachel does not feel a connection with Jack and sends him home. During the rose ceremony, Jonathan and Iggy are eliminated and Rachel and the remaining men have announced to travel to Oslo, Norway. In Norway, Bryan receives a one-on-one date with Rachel to ride a tram in the city and they go rappelling down the Holmenkollen Ski Jump at 187 feet (57 m) above. At dinner, Bryan opens up about his youth and how he blossomed during his senior year while Rachel opens up about her college years and he receives a rose. Adam, Dean, Anthony, Peter, Matt, Will, Alex, Eric and Josiah are selected to go on a group date, where they play handball against local players. Will impresses Rachel during the game and opens up to her that evening, he receives the group date rose. Lee and Kenny go on a two-on-one date. They take a helicopter ride through Hobøl in the Norwegian forest. Rachel goes back and forth between the two men about their side of the story. Rachel tells Kenny that Lee claimed he threw him out of a van and Kenny confronts Lee after his time with Rachel.
140	6	"Week 6: Denmark"	June 27, 2017	1306	4.51	1.2/5
As the two-on-one date continues in Norway, Kenny confronts Lee about his lies. Rachel returns to the forest and sends Lee home, but does not give the rose to Kenny. Before getting into the helicopter to leave, Kenny goes back to Lee to say his final words. At the end of the night, Rachel and Kenny spend time together and she gives him the rose. At the rose ceremony in Losby Gods Manor, Josiah and Anthony are sent home. The remaining group goes to Denmark as Eric went on his one-on-one date. The two explore Copenhagen to have a sightseeing on a canal boat and go to the famous Tivoli Gardens. Eric opens up about his relationship with his mom and receives a rose from Rachel. Dean, Kenny, Bryan, Alex, Matt, Peter, and Adam were chosen on the group date, where they row an ancient longship in Roskilde and have playing traditional Viking games. During the final round of the game, Kenny and Adam face off, where both men get superficial cuts. At the cocktail party after the group date, Kenny misses his daughter and is unsure about continuing on the show. Rachel understands Kenny's dilemma and the two mutually agree for Kenny to return home. Peter receives the group date rose. Will went on his one-on-one date with Rachel to ride a boat around Øresund strait from Helsingør, and arrive at Helsingborg, Sweden while they give a tour the city. They arrived at Carlsberg Museum in Copenhagen, Rachel is surprised by Will's lack of intimacy and his relationship history, so she sends him home. At the rose ceremony in Bernstorff Palace, Alex is sent home.
141	7	"Week 7: Switzerland"	July 10, 2017	1307	5.68	1.4/6
The six remaining men travel to Geneva, Switzerland. Rachel reveals there will be three one-on-one dates, one group date, and no rose ceremony. Bryan goes on first one-on-one date with Rachel. The two drive on a Bentley around Geneva, purchase Breitling watches, and explore the city. At dinner, they discuss about on Bryan's past relationship and he receives a rose. Dean is selected for the next one-on-one-date. Rachel and Dean attend a church service and walk around the city. Rachel hopes Dean will reveal another side to him, but during the day he remains very goofy and brushes it off, much to Rachel's frustration. Dean finally opens up at dinner about his insecurities about Rachel meeting his family. Rachel appreciates Dean opening up and he receives a rose. Peter goes on the final one-on-one date, ride on a helicopter from Montreux and landed at Swiss Alps where they ride a dog sled. Peter discusses his doubts about this experience and at dinner, opens up about his past relationships. Rachel questions if he is ready for marriage and Peter receives a rose at the end of the date. Matt, Adam, and Eric go on the group date while they ride a boat around Lake Geneva and strolled their day at Château De Coudrée in Sciez, France on the French–Swiss border. At the turn of the events, Matt is the first bachelor to be eliminated. During dinner, Adam and Eric discuss their respective possible hometown dates with Rachel. Eric receives the rose and Adam is eliminated.
142	8	"Week 8: Hometowns"	July 17, 2017	1308	6.21	1.6/7
Rachel first visits Eric's hometown of Baltimore, Maryland. They play basketball at the park when his cousin and best friend Ralph came, things are quite well for Eric. Then, Rachel meets Eric's friends and family. Rachel discusses the hardships of being on TV and the first black bachelorette with his family as Eric has never brought a girl home before, Rachel becomes concerned with his readiness to be married. Rachel then goes to Miami, Florida to visit Bryan and his family. He takes her around to small local spots and authentic Spanish bars in Latino community enclave. When Rachel meets his family, Bryan's mom becomes overprotective about Bryan, intimidating Rachel. The next hometown date is Madison, Wisconsin, to meet Peter and his family. At first, Peter takes Rachel around some local markets in the city and she meets his friends. Later that night, Rachel meets his family and expresses her concern about Peter's interest in marriage to his mother. Rachel then heads to Aspen, Colorado to meet Dean and his family and they ride on an ATV to a cross countryside. Dean hasn't spoken to his Sikh convert father in two years and felt very estranged, this is the first time his entire family has been together in a long time. Tensions rise as Dean and his father talk one-on-one, discussing their hardships over his mother's death. The rose ceremony in Rachel's hometown of Dallas where Dean was sent home.
143	9	"Week 9: Fantasy Suites"	July 24, 2017	1309	6.43	1.6/7
The three remaining men are in Dallas to meet Rachel's family, because her sister was unable to leave the country during her pregnancy. Peter went to a store looking a shirt for Rachel's nephew and bought it as a present, Peter discussed to Rachel's mother about on a potential future with Rachel shows that has few certain plans together. Eric traveled to Reunion Tower to give a look of the view of Dallas from the tower and have their lunch together, while speaking to Rachel's family that Eric has really never fell in love prior to the show. Bryan went to a bar and has intrigued over Rachel's friends about Rachel's The Bachelor application, but Rachel's family raises concerns over his sincerity, especially Rachel's sister. All three men traveled to La Rioja, Spain to have their own overnight dates with Rachel, Eric's date takes on a helicopter ride to Gaztelugatxe island in Basque Country to explore a monastery where they ring a bell many times and have a dinner together, only Eric received the fantasy suite invitation card. Peter involved visiting the wine cellar and he and Rachel met Vitorino, the winemaker, and had a tour and gave their keys down below the cellar, then the winemaker and his family had stomping grapes on a vineyard. It ends with a cliffhanger.
144	10	"The Men Tell All"	July 31, 2017	N/A	5.76	1.5/6
Eighteen of the thirty-one eliminated men sat down for the audience. Several of the contestants spoke of their lives after the competition. They cover stories about DeMario's girlfriend that has not getting along since his elimination, Kenny took on a hot seat about what happened on his fight with Lee and gave an apology to make peace with Lee. Then, he had felt little compressed about he missed his daughter during the show as his daughter Makenzi brought over at the stage holding a rose to him and surprised that would be going to Disneyland for his birthday. Lee came on through against racism on his tweets from his Twitter account, stated that he isn't making much humorous with his issues. Dean told about on his heartbreak during the show and hopes to find his better life to move on now that he is going to be part for Bachelor in Paradise. Rachel later joins to the men and she discusses about sad breakups and fun memories including DeMario's harsh comment about his girlfriend, Dean gives a standing ovation to make his sincerity for love. Then, bloopers is shown including Chris talked to Rachel seeing strangers walking during the Denmark date.
145	11	"Week 10: Season Finale & After the Final Rose"	August 7, 2017	1310	7.57	2.1/8
Concluded from the previous episode prior to The Men Tell All, Peter gets his time with Rachel and have dinner together and he receives the fantasy suite invitation. Bryan's date involved horseback riding at the vineyard in the Spanish countryside and enjoyed a leisure day together. As soon Bryan received his fantasy suite invitation, he feels that he is having a strong chemistry with Rachel that are having enjoyed their time. At the rose ceremony, Eric was eliminated, leaving Bryan and Peter in the final two. Eric speaks Rachel for the first time since his devastated breakup felt that his time with Rachel was deeply hard and made a lot of characteristics. Over the final dates, Bryan took on a hot air balloon overlooking La Rioja, stated to think of starting their memories began in the first night and they opened a present of Spanish dictionary for themselves. Peter went to the infamous Monastery of Nuestra Señora de Valvanera in Anguiano where they met a monk to tell on a certain future like marriage, etc. When Peter became mere frustrated, he is not ready to propose but still wants to continue on a relationship with Rachel and said a teary goodbye to him that felt blindsided. Peter talked to Rachel about on his life after an emotional breakup that he isn't going to make in love once more. Bryan proposed to Rachel with some Spanish words and Rachel accepts the proposal. As the engaged couple are seen in public for the first time, Bryan proposes to Rachel for a second time to the audience and the relationship became very close to start their new lives together. Chris gives a pre-honeymoon surprise to them at La Rioja.

== Controversies ==
=== Lee Garrett's racist tweets ===
The show came under fire for casting Lee Garrett, who had tweeted many racist comments, for their first ever black lead's season. Garrett's tweets consisted of comparing Black Lives Matter to a terrorist group, comparing the NAACP to the Ku Klux Klan, and called feminists ugly.
