= Becca Kufrin =

American television personality

- Born: Rebecca Jill Kufrin; April 3, 1990 (age 36); Benson, Minnesota, U.S.
- Education: Minnesota State University, Mankato
- Occupation: Television personality
- Years active: 2018–present
- Spouse: Thomas Jacobs (m. 2023)
- Children: 2

Rebecca Jill Kufrin-Jacobs (born April 3, 1990) is an American television personality, best known for her role as the winner on the 22nd season of ABC's The Bachelor and the lead of the 14th season of The Bachelorette.

== Early life and education ==
Kufrin was born in Benson, Minnesota, and raised in Prior Lake, Minnesota, the daughter of Jill and Steve Kufrin. She has an older sister named Emily. Kufrin graduated from Prior Lake High School in 2008, and obtained her Bachelor of Science degree in Mass Communications from Minnesota State University, Mankato in 2012. Her father died of brain cancer when Kufrin was 19 years old and her mother is a breast cancer survivor.

== Career ==
Before appearing on The Bachelor, she was working at Skyya Communications, a technology public relations agency based in Minneapolis, Minnesota.

== Television shows ==
=== The Bachelor ===
Kufrin was a contestant on Arie Luyendyk Jr.'s season of The Bachelor. After making it to the final 3, her ex-boyfriend Ross Jirgl showed up in Peru and proposed; Kufrin declined. She was initially chosen by Luyendyk as the winner and accepted his proposal at the end of the season. However, Luyendyk dumped Kufrin for the runner-up Lauren Burnham before the season finished airing. The break-up was filmed and the raw, unedited footage was shown on the first night of the two-night finale, a first for The Bachelor.

==== Response ====
After Luyendyk ended his engagement with Kufrin on air, Minnesota State Representative Drew Christensen proposed legislation to ban Luyendyk from the state of Minnesota. Additionally fans raised over $6,000 for Kufrin through the Venmo app, which Kufrin in turn donated to Stand Up to Cancer. Her donation was matched by ABC and later matched again by Katie Couric. The Bachelor season 20 lead, Ben Higgins, also pledged to donate the profits from each bag of coffee sold from his company for a 24-hour period. The day after the breakup aired, 12 billboards went up in Kufrin's hometown of Minneapolis, Minnesota, as well as 4 in Los Angeles and 1 in Times Square, all showing their support for Kufrin and disgust at Luyendyk's actions. During the March 10, 2018 episode of Saturday Night Live, Cecily Strong portrayed Kufrin in the cold-open, parodying the break-up.

=== The Bachelorette ===
Kufrin was announced as the Bachelorette on March 6, 2018, on ABC's After the Final Rose special. The season premiered on May 28, 2018. In the end, Kufrin chose Garrett Yrigoyen over runner-up Blake Horstmann. During the finale, she and Yrigoyen were given a minivan from ABC as a gift. The couple were engaged and moved to Carlsbad, California, where they lived with their adopted corgi, Minno. On September 1, 2020, Kufrin and Yrigoyen announced the end of their engagement.

=== Bachelor in Paradise ===
Kufrin made a brief appearance during season five of Bachelor in Paradise to give advice to the girls and give closure to Colton Underwood. On August 9, 2021, Becca was confirmed to be a contestant on season seven. She split from her partner Thomas Jacobs in week 6. They have gotten back together after filming wrapped. They got engaged in May 2022 and are now married with a child.

== Personal life ==
Kufrin was engaged to Arie Luyendyk Jr. from November 2017 to January 2018. She was later engaged to Garrett Yrigoyen from May 2018 to August 2020.

Kufrin began dating Thomas Jacobs in June 2021. On May 29, 2022, they announced their engagement, and on April 26, 2023, they announced that their first child was due in September 2023. On September 21, 2023, their son was born. Kufrin and Jacobs married on October 13, 2023. On October 30, 2025, they announced that they were expecting another child, due in April 2026. On April 10, 2026, Kufrin gave birth to their second son.

Preceded by Vanessa Grimaldi	The Bachelor winner Season 22 (2018)	Succeeded by Cassie Randolph
Preceded by Rachel Lindsay	The Bachelorette; Season 14	Succeeded by Hannah Brown
