= Judge Lindsey =

Judge Lindsey may refer to:

- Ben B. Lindsey (1869–1943), judge of the Colorado county court and juvenile court, and of the California Superior Court
- Joseph C. Lindsey (born 1959), judge of the Virginia Fourth Judicial Circuit

== See also ==
- Judge Lindsay (disambiguation)
