= The Bachelorette (American TV series) season 11 =

Season of US television series

The Bachelorette
- Season 11
- Promotional poster
- Starring: Kaitlyn Bristowe
- Presented by: Chris Harrison
- No. of contestants: 26
- Winner: Shawn Booth
- Runner-up: Nick Viall
- No. of episodes: 13

Release
- Original network: ABC
- Original release: May 18 – July 27, 2015

Additional information
- Filming dates: March 12 – May 3, 2015

Season chronology
- ← Previous; Season 10 Next → Season 12

The eleventh season of The Bachelorette features, for the first time ever, two Bachelorettes during the first episode. Kaitlyn Bristowe is a 29-year-old spin-class instructor from Leduc, Alberta, and Britt Nilsson is a 28-year-old waitress from Michigan, living in California. Bristowe finished in third place and Nilsson in sixth on season 19 of The Bachelor featuring Chris Soules.

This season premiered on May 18, 2015 with Bristowe selected as the Bachelorette. The finale aired on July 27, 2015 with Bristowe accepting a proposal from 28-year-old personal trainer Shawn Booth. On November 2, 2018, the couple announced they ended their engagement.

== Production ==
=== Casting and contestants ===
Casting began during the tenth season of The Bachelorette. Kaitlyn Bristowe and Britt Nilsson were initially listed as bachelorette candidates on March 9, 2015 during the After the Final Rose special on the nineteenth season of The Bachelor.

The cast includes Ryan McDill, who is the ex-boyfriend of The Bachelor season 18 winner Nikki Ferrell.

During the first episode, the Bachelors decide which of the ladies they would like to have as the Bachelorette for this season. In the second episode, which aired on May 19, 2015, it was revealed that Bristowe was selected as the new Bachelorette.

=== Filming and development ===
It began filming shortly after the finale of the nineteenth season of The Bachelor with the locale destinations including New York City, San Antonio and Ireland with appearances from Laila Ali, Amy Schumer, Doug E. Fresh and The Cranberries.

== Contestants ==
In week 4, season 10 runner-up Nick Viall joined the cast.

Name	Age	Hometown	Occupation	Outcome	Place	Ref
Shawn Booth	28	Windsor Locks, Connecticut	Personal Trainer	Winner	1	
Nick Viall	34	Waukesha, Wisconsin	Software Sales Executive	Runner-up	2	
Ben Higgins	26	Warsaw, Indiana	Software Salesman	Week 8	3	
Jared Haibon	26	Warwick, Rhode Island	Restaurant Manager	Week 7	4	
Joe Bailey	28	Glasgow, Kentucky	Insurance Agent	Week 7	5	
Chris Strandburg	28	Granite Bay, California	Dentist	Week 7	6	
Ben Zorn	26	Falls Church, Virginia	Fitness Coach	Week 6	7–8	
Tanner Tolbert	28	Stilwell, Kansas	Auto Finance Manager	Week 6	7–8	
John "JJ" Lane III	32	Dacono, Colorado	Former Investment Banker	Week 6	9	
Joshua Albers	31	Kuna, Idaho	Industrial Welder	Week 5	10–11	
Justin Reich	28	Elgin, Illinois	Fitness Trainer	Week 5	10–11	
Ian Thomson	28	Ramsey, New Jersey	Executive Recruiter	Week 5	12 (quit)	
Corey Stansell	30	Midtown Manhattan, New York	Investment Banker	Week 4	13–15	
Jonathan Holloway	33	Sylvan Lake, Michigan	Automotive Spokesman	Week 4	13–15	
Ryan Beckett	32	Wellington, Florida	Realtor	Week 4	13–15	
Clint Arlis	27	Batavia, Illinois	Architectural Engineer	Week 3	16	
Tony Harris	35	St. Louis, Missouri	Healer	Week 3	17 (quit)	
Cory Shivar	35	Seven Springs, North Carolina	Residential Developer	Week 2	18–19	
Daniel Finney	28	Nashville, Tennessee	Fashion Designer	Week 2	18–19	
Kupah James	32	Boston, Massachusetts	Entrepreneur	Week 2	20	
Bradley Cox	25	Duluth, Georgia	International Auto Shipper	Week 1	21–24	
David Cox	26	Orlando, Florida	Real Estate Agent	Week 1	21–24	
Josh Seiter	27	Chicago, Illinois	Law Student/Exotic Dancer	Week 1	21–24	
Shawn Evans	31	London, Ontario	Amateur Sex Coach	Week 1	21–24	
Brady Toops	33	Wauseon, Ohio	Singer/Songwriter	Week 1	25 (quit)	
Ryan McDill	28	Kansas City, Missouri	Junkyard Specialist	Week 1	26 (DQ) (Note: McDill was disqualified from the competition on the first night after making inappropriate advances towards Bristowe.)	

=== Future appearances ===
==== The Bachelor ====
Ben Higgins was chosen as the lead of the twentieth season of The Bachelor.

Nick Viall was chosen as the lead of the twenty-first season of The Bachelor.

==== Bachelor in Paradise ====
Season 2

JJ Lane, Jonathan Holloway, Tanner Tolbert, Joshua Albers, Joe Bailey, Justin Reich, and Jared Haibon returned for the second season of Bachelor in Paradise. Holloway was eliminated in week 2. Bailey in week 4. Lane quit the show in week 3, and Haibon in week 5. Albers split from Tenley Molzahn in week 6. Reich left Paradise in a relationship with Cassandra Ferguson. Tolbert ended the season engaged to Jade Roper.

Season 3

Haibon, Viall and Ryan Beckett returned for the third season of Bachelor in Paradise. Beckett was eliminated in week 4. Haibon quit the show in week 5 to pursue a relationship with Caila Quinn. Viall split from Jennifer Saviano in week 6.

Season 4

Ben Zorn returned for the fourth season of Bachelor in Paradise. He quit the show in week 3.

Season 1

Haibon appeared on season 2 of Bachelor in Paradise Australia. He quit in week 7.

==== Dancing with the Stars ====
Viall competed in the twenty-fourth season of Dancing With the Stars. He partnered with Peta Murgatroyd and finished in 7th place.

Bristowe competed in and won the twenty-ninth season of the show with her partner Artem Chigvintsev.

==== The Bachelor Winter Games ====
Higgins returned for The Bachelor Winter Games as a part of Team USA. He quit in week 3.

==== The Bachelorette ====
Bristowe was named as the interim host for The Bachelorette in seasons 17 and 18 alongside fellow lead Tayshia Adams, replacing Chris Harrison.

== Call-out order ==
Order	Bachelors	Week								
Order	Bachelors	1	2	3	4	5	6	7	8	9
1	Ben H.	Shawn B.	Ben Z.	Shawn B.	Justin	Ben H.	Nick	Shawn B.	Nick	Shawn B.
2	Jonathan	Chris	Clint	Ben Z.	Jared	Nick	Jared	Ben H.	Shawn B.	Nick
3	Clint	Ben H.	J.J.	Ben H.	Chris	Shawn B.	Joe	Nick	Ben H.	
4	Ryan B.	J.J.	Jared	Chris; Corey (NY); Ian; Jared; J.J. Joe; Jonathan; Joshua; Ryan B. Tanner	Ben H.	Jared	Ben H.	Jared		
5	Jared	Joe	Ben H.	Chris; Corey (NY); Ian; Jared; J.J. Joe; Jonathan; Joshua; Ryan B. Tanner	Ben Z.	Chris	Chris	Joe		
6	Kupah	Kupah	Shawn B.	Chris; Corey (NY); Ian; Jared; J.J. Joe; Jonathan; Joshua; Ryan B. Tanner	Shawn B.	J.J.	Shawn B.	Chris		
7	Brady	Daniel	Jonathan	Chris; Corey (NY); Ian; Jared; J.J. Joe; Jonathan; Joshua; Ryan B. Tanner	Tanner	Joe	Ben Z. Tanner			
8	Cory (NC)	Ryan B.	Tanner	Chris; Corey (NY); Ian; Jared; J.J. Joe; Jonathan; Joshua; Ryan B. Tanner	Joe	Ben Z.	Ben Z. Tanner			
9	Ian	Joshua	Chris	Chris; Corey (NY); Ian; Jared; J.J. Joe; Jonathan; Joshua; Ryan B. Tanner	Ian	Tanner	J.J.			
10	J.J.	Tony	Ryan B.	Chris; Corey (NY); Ian; Jared; J.J. Joe; Jonathan; Joshua; Ryan B. Tanner	J.J.	Joshua; Justin				
11	Ryan M.	Clint	Justin	Chris; Corey (NY); Ian; Jared; J.J. Joe; Jonathan; Joshua; Ryan B. Tanner	Joshua	Joshua; Justin				
12	Bradley	Corey (NY)	Ian	Chris; Corey (NY); Ian; Jared; J.J. Joe; Jonathan; Joshua; Ryan B. Tanner	Nick	Ian				
13	Daniel	Jonathan	Joshua	Chris; Corey (NY); Ian; Jared; J.J. Joe; Jonathan; Joshua; Ryan B. Tanner	Corey (NY); Jonathan; Ryan B.					
14	Josh	Cory (NC)	Joe	Chris; Corey (NY); Ian; Jared; J.J. Joe; Jonathan; Joshua; Ryan B. Tanner	Corey (NY); Jonathan; Ryan B.					
15	Joe	Ben Z.	Corey (NY)	Clint	Corey (NY); Jonathan; Ryan B.					
16	Justin	Tanner	Tony	Tony						
17	Tanner	Ian	Cory (NC); Daniel							
18	Shawn B.	Justin	Cory (NC); Daniel							
19	David	Jared	Kupah							
20	Corey (NY)	Bradley; David; Josh; Shawn E.								
21	Tony	Bradley; David; Josh; Shawn E.								
22	Shawn E.	Bradley; David; Josh; Shawn E.								
23	Chris	Bradley; David; Josh; Shawn E.								
24	Joshua	Brady								
25	Ben Z.	Ryan M.								
26	Nick (Note: Viall entered the competition in week 4.)									

The contestant received the first impression rose
The contestant received a rose during a date
The contestant was eliminated
The contestant was eliminated during a date
The contestant quit the competition
The contestant was disqualified from the competition
The contestant was eliminated outside the rose ceremony
The contestant moved on to the next week by default
The contestant won the competition

== Episodes ==
No. overall	No. in season	Title	Original release date	Prod. code	U.S. viewers (millions)	Rating/share (18–49)
110	1	"Week 1, Part 1: Season Premiere"	May 18, 2015	1101A	7.10	2.1/7
Season 11 begins with two bachelorettes, Britt and Kaitlyn, waiting to greet the men as they arrive at the mansion. Some memorable highlights include Shawn E. showing up riding in a hot tub car, Chris riding in a cupcake, and Joe bringing moonshine from his hometown in Kentucky. Britt and Kaitlyn struggle with having to share the evening. Once inside, they talk with the different guys and the men prepare to vote on who will be the next bachelorette and who will go home. The men appear split between Kaitlyn and Britt. Ryan M. drinks too much, becomes intoxicated and makes inappropriate moves, like jumping into the pool in his underwear and touching Kaitlyn's butt. Chris Harrison sends him home before the vote. The men cast their votes for the women and the episode ends as Chris Harrison gets ready to announce the winner.
111	2	"Week 1, Part 2"	May 19, 2015	1101B	7.09	1.9/7
Concluding from the previous episode, Chris Harrison reveals the results of the vote for the next bachelorette and it is Kaitlyn. Britt leaves heartbroken and in tears. Kaitlyn continues to spend time with the men and shares a kiss with Chris. She gives the first impression rose to Shawn B. and they share a kiss as well. In the middle of the rose ceremony, Brady pulls Kaitlyn aside. He tells her he would like to leave and pursue a relationship with Britt. Bradley, David, Josh and Shawn E. do not receive roses and are sent home. At the end of the episode, as the credits roll, Brady knocks on the door of Britt's hotel room.
112	3	"Week 2"	May 25, 2015	1102	5.37	1.6/5
Eight men are chosen to go on the first group date and find out they will be training for a boxing match with Laila Ali and then competing against one another. Ali, Kaitlyn and Chris Harrison are the judges. During the final round of the competition, Ben Z. hits Jared hard enough to result in Jared going to the hospital. During the evening portion of the date, Kaitlyn connects with some of the other men. Jared makes a surprise visit to reassure Kaitlyn he is okay and they share a romantic walk. At the end of the date, Kaitlyn gives the date rose to Ben Z. Clint receives the first one-on-one date of the season. He and Kaitlyn do an underwater photo shoot and discover they have chemistry. Kaitlyn says Clint brings out her romantic side and she gives him the date rose. For the second group date, seven men perform a stand-up comedy routine with Amy Schumer along and fellow comedians Bridget Everett, Nikki Glaser and Rachel Feinstein. Some of them pleasantly surprise Kaitlyn, though Tony's act lacks comedy and focuses on different topics. Kaitlyn connects with many of the guys on her date but ultimately gives J.J. the rose. At the cocktail party, J.J. steals Kaitlyn away immediately, which upsets the other men who do not yet have roses. Kupah confronts Kaitlyn about whether or not she thinks they have a connection. The conversation goes poorly and Kaitlyn overhears him talking loudly about it with the other guys. She decides to let him go, but before the rose ceremony he blows up in a fit of anger. The episode ends in a cliffhanger. Brady and Britt continue to bond and go on dates. Brady asks Britt to be his girlfriend and she accepts.
113	4	"Week 3"	June 1, 2015	1103	6.52	1.9/6
Picking up where the last episode left off, Kaitlyn overhears Kupah's tirade and goes outside to make sure he leaves. Afterward, Cory (NC) and Daniel are eliminated in the rose ceremony. Six men are chosen for the first group date and they are awakened by two sumo wrestlers, Byambajav Ulambayar (Byamba) and Yamamotoyama Ryūta (Yama). They are taken to Universal CityWalk where they meet up with Kaitlyn. The men receive sumo wrestling lessons and participate in a round robin tournament. Tony complains to Kaitlyn that these aggressive dates don't align with his character and he decides not to participate. Ultimately, Tony decides to leave the competition. Kaitlyn gives the group date rose to Shawn B. Ben Z. gets the one-on-one date. He and Kaitlyn have to escape a locked room filled with birds, bugs, and snakes using clues in the room. Kaitlyn gives Ben Z. the date rose. Six men go on the second group date. They meet up with Kaitlyn at an elementary school where they must teach sex education to the class of kids who are secretly child actors. Kaitlyn gives Ben H. the group date rose. Meanwhile, back at the mansion, J.J. and Clint have a fostering "bromance." Most of the other men reveal to Kaitlyn that Clint is not there for the right reasons. The episode ends in a cliffhanger.
114	5	"Week 4: New York City"	June 8, 2015	1104	6.37	1.8/6
Continuing from the last episode, Kaitlyn pulls Clint aside and tells him that the other men have advised her about his ill intentions. Clint denies the accusations, but Kaitlyn decides to send him home. Clint looks to J.J. for support, but does not find any. Kaitlyn decides to cancel the rose ceremony and Chris Harrison tells the group they will be heading to New York City. Once in New York City, nine men find themselves on the first group date where they have to write and perform a rap with advisor Doug E. Fresh at Stage 48. After the show, Kaitlyn finds out Nick Viall (runner-up from the previous season) is in the audience. Kaitlyn and Nick had been talking prior to her becoming the Bachelorette and she considers the possibility of having Nick join the men vying for her love. Kaitlyn takes the men to Chelsea Piers for the after-party and they are not thrilled with the idea of Nick joining him. They express concerns over the way Nick disrespected former Bachelorette, Andi, at the After the Final Rose. Kaitlyn decides she needs to sleep on the decision and awards the date rose to Justin. The next day, Kaitlyn invites Nick to join the competition for a second chance at love and he accepts. Jared receives a one-on-one date. He and Kaitlyn travel to the Metropolitan Museum of Art where they have a tour and a private dinner followed by a helicopter ride. Jared receives a rose from Kaitlyn. Five men go on the second group date to the New Amsterdam Theatre where they take part in an audition in the Broadway show of Aladdin with the help of Broadway stars Adam Jacobs and Courtney Reed. Chris wins the competition, and the other four men have to return to the hotel. He and Kaitlyn have a brief walk-on role in that night's performance and then they go to the top of One Times Square. Kaitlyn gives him a rose. After the group date, Nick arrives at the hotel, ending the episode in cliffhanger.
115	6	"Week 5: San Antonio, Texas"	June 15, 2015	1105	6.29	1.8/6
Concluding from the previous episode, the men take the opportunity to speak with Nick and voice their concerns about his arrival. Then the group attends a cocktail party at Citi Field complete with a rose ceremony near the pitcher's mound. At the rose ceremony, Nick receives a rose while Corey (NY), Jonathan and Ryan B. are eliminated. Chris Harrison announces the show will move to San Antonio, Texas. Ben H. receives a one-on-one date in San Antonio. He meets up with Kaitlyn at Gruene Hall in New Braunfels. The pair learns the Texas Two-Step dance and perform on stage in front of local judges. Next, they go to Majestic Theatre where they view the sunset and Ben H. receives the rose. Nine men take part on the group date and are greeted by Sebastian De La Cruz, a mariachi superstar and his band. The men must write and sing a song to Kaitlyn. Joshua talks with the other men about his concerns over Nick. Ultimately, he tells Kaitlyn that all of the men are concerned about Nick's presence, but he realizes he has misspoken and tries to backtrack. Later that evening at the after party at the Enchanted Springs Ranch, Kaitlyn asks the men whether they are concerned about Nick, even though Kaitlyn herself wants him there. No one will confess to being concerned and Kaitlyn pointedly gives the group date rose to Nick. Shawn B. receives the second one-on-one date and they travel to San Antonio River Walk where they go kayaking. They end their trip at the Arneson River Theatre which they share a kiss. Shawn confesses to Kaitlyn that he already has feelings for her. Afterwards they watch fireworks at the San Antonio Botanical Garden and Kaitlyn gives Shawn B. the date rose. At the cocktail party in the Alamo, Ian tells Kaitlyn that he feels ignored by her, going so far as to accuse her of being shallow and only on the show to make out with guys. For the fourth time in a row, the episode ends with a cliffhanger.
116	7	"Week 6: Dublin"	June 22, 2015	1106	6.64	2.0/7
Picking up where the last episode left off, Kaitlyn and Ian decide Ian should go home. She is upset by the words he said to her and finds comfort in Nick. At the rose ceremony, Kaitlyn sends Joshua and Justin home. Shortly afterwards, Kaitlyn and the guys find out they will be heading to Dublin, Ireland. Nick receives the first one-on-one date in Ireland. He and Kaitlyn spend the day in Phoenix Park and have dinner inside Christ Church Cathedral. Kaitlyn gives Nick a rose. After the date, she invites him back to her hotel room and they have sex. At The Radisson Blu Hotel where the men are staying, Shawn B. and Jared discuss their concerns about the fate of their relationships with Kaitlyn. The next day, Kaitlyn feels worried, confused, and slightly guilty that she spent the night with Nick. Nick keeps the sexual activity secret from the rest of the men. Six men go on a group date and attend a tradition Irish wake for Kaitlyn. The men recite eulogies for Kaitlyn. The activity is difficult for Ben Z. At the after party, Kaitlyn gives the rose to Jared and they attend a concert of The Cranberries performing "Linger". Shawn feels uncertain about his relationship with Kaitlyn. Later that night, Shawn enters Kaitlyn's hotel room, hoping to discuss the way he is feeling, and the episode ends in another cliffhanger.
117	8	"Week 7: Killarney"	June 29, 2015	1107	6.72	1.9/7
Concluded from the previous episode, Shawn attempted to express his feelings and emotions to Kaitlyn, and she is emotionally exhausted as well as worried, but they temporarily reconcile and kiss. The next morning, while Shawn sits on the front steps of The Radisson Blu Hotel which they stayed, Nick and Tanner are seen walking together, unknown to Shawn. Nick complains about Shawn's emotional instability. Kaitlyn continues to feel paranoid over what occurred between her and Nick, fearing it could ruin her relationships with the remaining men. Shawn, meanwhile, also continues to feel paranoid, claiming that Kaitlyn told him "I think you're the one," while they were off-camera together. Jared receives the one-on-one date, where they go to Ireland's Eye, and he receives a rose. Joe and J.J. have faced the two-on-one date, they meet with Kaitlyn to a park for a picnic. J.J. confesses to Kaitlyn that he cheated on his wife, which led to the demise of his marriage and losing everything. Kaitlyn appreciates his honesty; however, she feels a stronger connection with Joe and has the rose on his hand. Although she doesn't immediately give him the rose, she says goodbye to J.J. At the cocktail party, Ben H. pulls Kaitlyn aside to share similar concerns as Shawn's. Kaitlyn is relieved that he is not as paranoid as Shawn, and thanks him for not jumping to conclusions. Nick subsequently pulls Kaitlyn aside, where they talk about their night following the one-on-one date. At the rose ceremony, Tanner and Ben Z. are eliminated. Afterwards, Kaitlyn telling the remaining guys they will be heading to Killarney. In Killarney, Kaitlyn and the remaining guys are in Ballyseede Castle, Chris Harrison announces a new twist: instead of sending two guys home and having a traditional hometown dates with the four remaining guys, three guys will be sent home, quality time off camera will be provided, and hometown dates will come later. Chris receives the one-on-one date, he and Kaitlyn took a helicopter ride to Killarney National Park, landed in the Cliffs of Moher to set a picnic. Kaitlyn tearfully confesses that she is unsure about a future with Chris and parts ways with him, leaving Chris heartbroken and unexpectedly in tears. The episode ends in cliffhanger sixth episode in a row.
118	9	"Week 8: Fantasy Suites"	July 6, 2015	1108	7.05	2.0/7
Concluded from the previous episode, Kaitlyn has one-on-one dates with Jared and Ben H, and a group date with Joe, Shawn B. and Nick. During the course of the date, she decides to eliminate Joe, who makes some cold remarks before leaving. She then tells Shawn B. and Nick that she will not be giving a group date rose, and sends Nick back to the hotel. She informs Shawn B. about what happened between her and Nick in Dublin, and after taking some time to compose himself, he decides to man up and deal with it. At the rose ceremony, Jared is eliminated. The episode started for the overnight dates, Nick is given the fantasy date in Cork. Tensions are high between Shawn B. and Nick, where it ends a cliffhanger for the seventh time in a row.
119	10	"Week 9: Season Finale, Part 1"	July 13, 2015	1109	6.96	1.9/7
Concluded from the previous episode, Shawn B. and Nick have a private discussion and air their differences. Kaitlyn has a remainder of overnight dates with Ben H. in County Galway, and Shawn B in the Northern part of Ireland. Nick attempts to have a further discussion with Shawn but he has nothing to say to Nick. At the rose ceremony, Ben H. is eliminated. The show then moves to Park City, Utah where Kaitlyn gets a chance to meet Nick and Shawn's families as tensions rise to argue between the guys themselves. Nick's family is concerned about what is different this time than it was with Andi Dorfman. Shawn takes his time playing golf removing his clothes and got naked, when his family is concerned about the overall process. Both families are very impressed with Kaitlyn.
120	11	"The Men Tell All"	July 20, 2015	N/A	6.97	1.9/7
Seventeen of the twenty-three eliminated guys sat down for the audience. Several of the contestants spoke of their lives after the competition. They told stories include Ian apologized to everyone for what he said to Kaitlyn. J.J. and Clint said that they are straight but simply formed a deep friendship. There was much discussion about whether it was fair for Kaitlyn to bring Nick in mid-show, and the consensus was that she was entitled to do so if she wished. Kaitlyn, who was greeted with a standing ovation from the studio audience and eliminated contestants, revealed that she has been receiving hate mail from some viewers. After host Chris Harrison finishes reading the hate mail, the studio audience and bachelors commend her for her bravery in being on the show with another standing ovation. She got closure with Ben Z, Jared and Ben H. Then Kaitlyn's blooper reel was shown, which featured several humorous run-ins with birds.
121	12	"Week 10: Season Finale, Part 2"	July 27, 2015	1110	8.13	2.5/9
Both Nick and Shawn get the opportunity to meet Kaitlyn's family in Malibu. Things end up going smoothly for Nick who passes the mom test and gets the approval from Kaitlyn's father to have Kaitlyn's hand in marriage. The whole family seems to like Nick very much and are excited to meet Shawn. Kaitlyn and Nick embark on their last date at Marina del Rey with a nice boat ride. Kaitlyn and Shawn's final date is on a winery at Saddlerock Ranch in Malibu; at first, things seem awkward, but they both attribute it to mutual feelings of intensity of the whole situation, particularly for Kaitlyn. However, they once again reconcile and continue to strengthen their connection later that evening. At the final rose ceremony, Kaitlyn steps out of the limo at the mansion and is escorted to the backyard by Chris Harrison. The first limo arrives, with Nick stepping out of the car. He is led to the backyard where he professes his love for Kaitlyn, who stops him before he gets down on one knee, to tell him that her heart is with someone else. Ultimately, Nick wishes Kaitlyn luck and heads home in the limo, claiming that he is "the biggest joke." Shawn arrives and heads to the backyard to profess his love to Kaitlyn, who then professes her love to Shawn. Down on one knee, Shawn asks Kaitlyn for her hand in marriage, and she happily accepts.
122	13	"After the Final Rose"	July 27, 2015	N/A	7.94	2.3/8
Shawn and Kaitlyn are still together and engaged and are happier than ever. While still not best friends, Nick and Shawn ended things on an amicable note. Next it was time for Kaitlyn to come out and talk to Nick. Kaitlyn tells Nick that she knew he wasn't the one, but wasn't sure how to break it off with him. Nick wishes that she hadn't let him give his proposal speech before dumping him, which Kaitlyn agrees should have been done, but both wish each other the best. Kaitlyn and Shawn are seen together on their public appearance for the first time, where they share their excitement for their new lives as a couple.

== Controversies ==
=== Snapchat spoiler ===
On June 12, weeks before the finale of the season, Bristowe posted a picture on Snapchat of her and Shawn Booth, her final choice, in bed together.
