= The Bachelor (American TV series) season 21 =

21st season of The Bachelor

The Bachelor
- Season 21
- Promotional poster
- Starring: Nick Viall
- Presented by: Chris Harrison
- No. of contestants: 30
- Winner: Vanessa Grimaldi
- Runner-up: Raven Gates
- No. of episodes: 13 (including 2 specials)

Release
- Original network: ABC
- Original release: January 2 – March 13, 2017

Additional information
- Filming dates: September 24 – November 18, 2016

Season chronology
- ← Previous; Season 20 Next → Season 22

The twenty-first season of The Bachelor premiered on January 2, 2017. This season features 36-year-old Nick Viall, a software sales executive from Waukesha, Wisconsin.

Viall graduated from the University of Wisconsin–Milwaukee with a bachelor's degree in business administration. He previously appeared as the runner-up on both the 10th and 11th seasons of The Bachelorette, featuring Andi Dorfman and Kaitlyn Bristowe, respectively. Viall also participated in the 3rd season of Bachelor in Paradise, where he formed a connection with alumna Jennifer Saviano but did not pursue a long-term relationship.

The season concluded on March 13, 2017, with Viall proposing to 29-year-old special education teacher Vanessa Grimaldi. The couple ended their engagement on August 25, 2017.

== Production ==
=== Casting and contestants ===
On August 30, 2016, during season 2, episode 4 of Bachelor in Paradise: After Paradise—and while the 3rd season of Bachelor in Paradise was still airing—Nick Viall was announced as the next Bachelor.

Before Viall's selection as the lead for the 21st season of The Bachelor, fan favorites Luke Pell and Chase McNary—both from season 12 of The Bachelorette—were strongly considered for the role, as revealed by host Chris Harrison.

Pell and McNary ultimately went on to participate in other installments of the Bachelor franchise. Pell competed in The Bachelor Winter Games, while McNary appeared in season six of Bachelor in Paradise.

=== Filming and development ===
Filming for this season began on September 24, 2016, with the show traveling to various locations, including Nick Viall's home state of Wisconsin, New Orleans, Louisiana, Saint Thomas in the United States Virgin Islands, Bimini in the Bahamas, and Lapland in Finland.

Numerous media outlets reported that the Backstreet Boys performed on September 30, 2016, at the Honda Stage at the iHeartRadio Theater in Downtown Los Angeles during the season. Besides the Backstreet Boys, other notable appearances included Olympians Michelle Carter, Allyson Felix, and Carl Lewis, country singer Chris Lane, and singer Lolo.

The production was initially scheduled to travel from Los Angeles to Charleston, South Carolina, with host Chris Harrison indicating a stop at Kiawah Island. However, due to the impact of Hurricane Matthew on South Carolina, the location was changed to Viall's home state of Wisconsin. South Carolina was later visited during the thirteenth season of The Bachelorette.

== Contestants ==
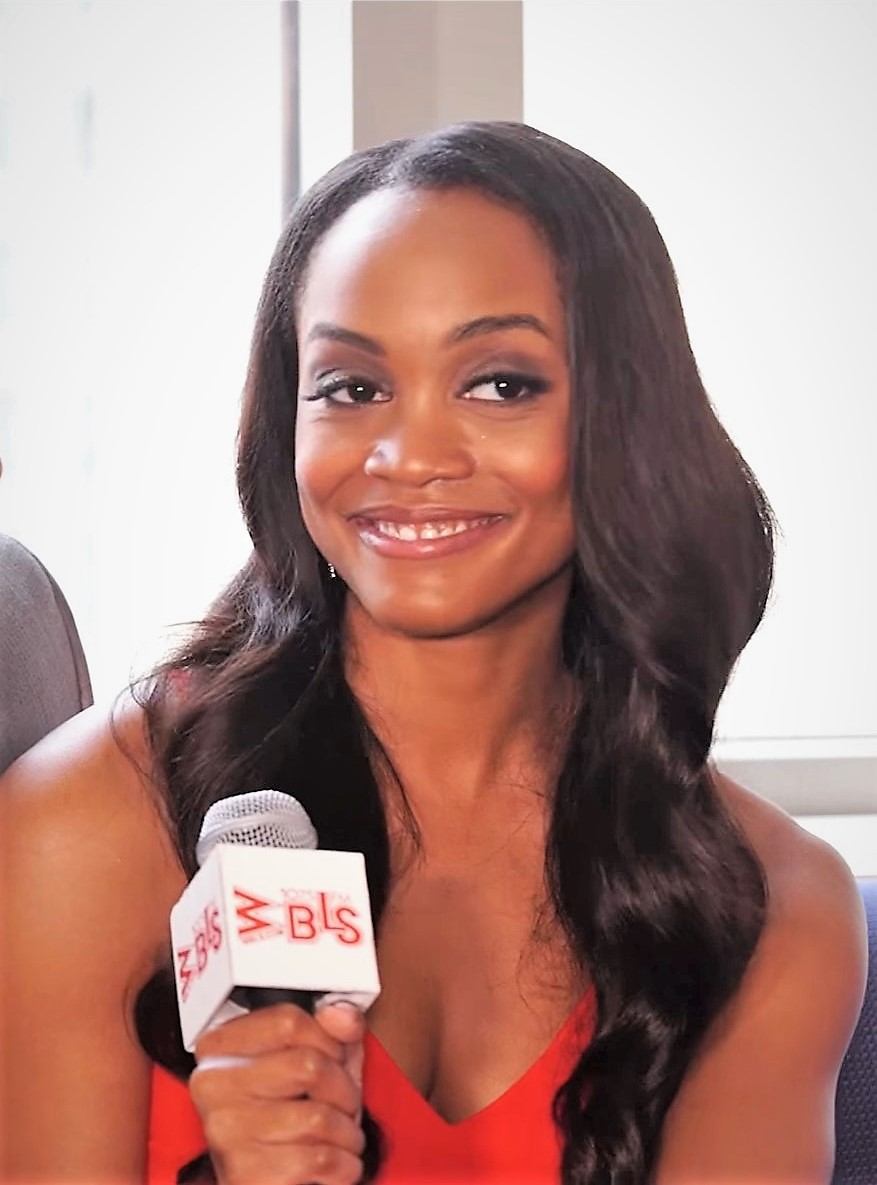
Rachel Lindsay

The season began with 30 contestants.

Name	Age	Hometown	Occupation	Outcome	Place	Ref
Vanessa Grimaldi	29	Montreal, Quebec	Special Education Teacher	Winner	1	
Raven Gates	25	Hoxie, Arkansas	Fashion Boutique Owner	Runner-Up	2	
Rachel Lindsay	31	Dallas, Texas	Attorney	Week 9	3	
Corinne Olympios	24	Miami, Florida	Business Owner	Week 8	4	
Kristina Schulman	24	Lexington, Kentucky	Dental Hygienist	Week 7	5	
Danielle Maltby	31	Colgate, Wisconsin	Neonatal Nurse	Week 7	6	
Danielle Lombard	27	Danville, California	Small Business Owner	Week 6	7	
Whitney Fransway	25	Chanhassen, Minnesota	Pilates Instructor	Week 6	8	
Jasmine Goode	29	Maplewood, New Jersey	Pro Basketball Dancer	Week 6	9	
Alexis Waters	23	Secaucus, New Jersey	Aspiring Dolphin Trainer	Week 5	10–12	
Jaimi King	28	New Orleans, Louisiana	Chef	Week 5	10–12	
Josephine Tutman	24	Santa Cruz, California	Registered Nurse	Week 5	10–12	
Taylor Nolan	23	Seattle, Washington	Mental Health Counselor	Week 5	13	
Astrid Loch	26	Tampa, Florida	Plastic Surgery Office Manager	Week 4	14–15	
Sarah Vendal	26	Palmdale, California	Grade School Teacher	Week 4	14–15	
Brittany Farrar	26	Santa Monica, California	Travel Nurse	Week 3	16–17	
Christen Whitney	25	Martinsville, Indiana	Wedding Videographer	Week 3	16–17	
Dominique Alexis	25	Los Angeles, California	Restaurant Server	Week 3	18	
Elizabeth Whitelaw	24	New Trier, Illinois	Marketing Manager	Week 2	19–21	
Hailey Merkt†	23	Vancouver, British Columbia	Photographer	Week 2	19–21	
Lacey Mark	25	Montville, New Jersey	Digital Marketing Manager	Week 2	19–21	
Elizabeth "Liz" Sandoz	29	Scottsbluff, Nebraska	Doula	Week 2	22	
Angela Amezcua	26	Cumberland, Maryland	Model	Week 1	23–30	
Briana Guertler	28	Salt Lake City, Utah	Surgical Unit Nurse	Week 1	23–30	
Ida Marie DeLosSantos	23	Harlingen, Texas	Sales Manager	Week 1	23–30	
Jasmine Brown	25	Tacoma, Washington	Flight Attendant	Week 1	23–30	
Lauren Hussey	30	Naples, Florida	Law School Graduate	Week 1	23–30	
Michelle Ramkissoon	24	Silver Spring, Maryland	Food Truck Owner	Week 1	23–30	
Olivia Burnette	25	Anchorage, Alaska	Apparel Sales Representative	Week 1	23–30	
Susannah Milan	26	Jamul, California	Account Manager	Week 1	23–30	

=== Future appearances ===
==== The Bachelorette ====
Rachel Lindsay was announced as the lead for the thirteenth season of The Bachelorette while this season of The Bachelor was still airing. She made history as the first African American lead in the franchise.

Additionally, several contestants from Nick Viall's season, including Raven Gates, Alexis Waters, Kristina Schulman, Astrid Loch, Whitney Fransway, Jasmine Goode, and Corinne Olympios, made notable appearances throughout the season.

==== Bachelor in Paradise ====
Season 4

Several contestants from Nick Viall's season returned for season 4 of Bachelor in Paradise. These included Raven, Corinne, Taylor Nolan, Alexis, Lacey Mark, Kristina, Danielle Maltby, Danielle Lombard, Christen Whitney, Sarah Vendal, Dominique Alexis, Jaimi King, and Jasmine.

- Week 1: Corinne quit after the production shutdown. Lacey initially quit but returned following the resumption of filming.
- Week 2: Danielle M. quit, and Alexis and Sarah were eliminated.
- Week 3: Kristina quit.
- Week 4: Jaimi was eliminated. Danielle L. split from Dean Unglert, Christen split from Jack Stone, Dominique split from Diggy Moreland, and Jasmine split from Jonathan Treece.

At the end of the season, Raven, Taylor, and Lacey left Paradise in relationships with Adam Gottschalk, Derek Peth, and Daniel Maguire, respectively. However, it was revealed during the reunion show that Lacey and Daniel had ended their relationship. Adam and Raven were still together, while Derek and Taylor became engaged.

Season 5

Christen, Astrid, and Angela Amezcua returned for season 5 of Bachelor in Paradise.

- Week 4: Angela and Christen were eliminated.
- Week 6: Astrid split from Kevin Wendt.

During the reunion show, it was announced that Astrid and Kevin had rekindled their relationship after leaving Paradise.

Season 6

Angela and Kristina returned for season 6, along with Whitney.

- Week 5: Kristina and Whitney both quit.
- Week 6: Angela split from Chase McNary.

Season 8

Danielle M. returned for season 8 of Bachelor in Paradise. She left in a relationship with Michael Allio in week 6.

==== Bachelor in Paradise Canada ====
Season 1

Angela participated in the inaugural season of Bachelor in Paradise Canada. She left the show in a relationship with Brendan Morgan.

==== Dancing with the Stars ====
Nick Viall competed in the 24th season of Dancing with the Stars. He was partnered with professional dancer Peta Murgatroyd and finished in sixth place.

==== Ex on the Beach ====
Jasmine appeared on the first season of the U.S. version of Ex on the Beach.

==== House of Villains ====
Corinne appeared on the first season of House of Villains.

== Call-out order ==
Order	Bachelorettes	Week									
Order	Bachelorettes	1	2	3	4	5	6 (Note: Nick decided to cancel the cocktail party and the rose ceremony. The remaining contestants were given roses by default.)	7 (Note: In week 7, there was no traditional rose ceremony held. Nick gave the roses directly to the remaining ladies instead and told them that they are still in the competition.)	8	9	10
1	Danielle L.	Rachel	Corinne	Danielle L.	Danielle L.	Rachel	Kristina	Raven	Raven	Raven	Vanessa
2	Elizabeth	Vanessa	Danielle M.	Vanessa	Kristina	Danielle M.	Raven (Note: Raven mentioned that she did have the rose from the group date. The segment of the date when Nick gave the rose to her was unaired.)	Vanessa	Rachel	Vanessa	Raven
3	Rachel	Danielle L.	Christen (Note: Christen had the rose from the second group date. The segment of the date when Nick gave the rose to her was unaired.)	Rachel	Raven	Corinne	Corinne; Danielle M. Rachel; Vanessa	Corinne	Vanessa	Rachel	
4	Christen	Christen	Astrid	Raven	Whitney	Kristina	Corinne; Danielle M. Rachel; Vanessa	Rachel	Corinne		
5	Taylor	Astrid	Taylor	Taylor	Danielle M.	Raven	Corinne; Danielle M. Rachel; Vanessa	Kristina			
6	Kristina	Corinne	Whitney	Whitney	Jasmine G.	Vanessa	Corinne; Danielle M. Rachel; Vanessa	Danielle M.			
7	Angela	Elizabeth	Kristina	Kristina	Rachel	Danielle L.	Danielle L.				
8	Lauren	Jasmine G.	Danielle L.	Jasmine G.	Jaimi	Jasmine G.	Whitney				
9	Michelle	Raven	Rachel	Alexis	Josephine	Whitney	Jasmine G.				
10	Dominique	Kristina	Vanessa	Astrid	Vanessa	Alexis; Jaimi; Josephine					
11	Ida Marie	Danielle M.	Raven	Danielle M.	Alexis	Alexis; Jaimi; Josephine					
12	Olivia	Sarah	Jaimi	Jaimi	Corinne	Alexis; Jaimi; Josephine					
13	Sarah	Josephine	Dominique	Josephine	Taylor	Taylor					
14	Jasmine G.	Lacey	Sarah	Sarah	Astrid; Sarah						
15	Hailey	Taylor	Alexis	Corinne	Astrid; Sarah						
16	Astrid	Alexis	Brittany	Brittany; Christen							
17	Liz	Hailey	Josephine	Brittany; Christen							
18	Corinne	Whitney	Jasmine G.	Dominique							
19	Vanessa	Dominique	Elizabeth; Hailey; Lacey								
20	Danielle M.	Jaimi	Elizabeth; Hailey; Lacey								
21	Raven	Brittany	Elizabeth; Hailey; Lacey								
22	Jaimi	Liz	Liz								
23	Briana	Angela; Briana; Ida Marie; Jasmine B. Lauren; Michelle; Olivia; Susannah									
24	Susannah	Angela; Briana; Ida Marie; Jasmine B. Lauren; Michelle; Olivia; Susannah									
25	Josephine	Angela; Briana; Ida Marie; Jasmine B. Lauren; Michelle; Olivia; Susannah									
26	Brittany	Angela; Briana; Ida Marie; Jasmine B. Lauren; Michelle; Olivia; Susannah									
27	Jasmine B.	Angela; Briana; Ida Marie; Jasmine B. Lauren; Michelle; Olivia; Susannah									
28	Whitney	Angela; Briana; Ida Marie; Jasmine B. Lauren; Michelle; Olivia; Susannah									
29	Lacey	Angela; Briana; Ida Marie; Jasmine B. Lauren; Michelle; Olivia; Susannah									
30	Alexis	Angela; Briana; Ida Marie; Jasmine B. Lauren; Michelle; Olivia; Susannah									

The contestant received the first impression rose
The contestant received a rose during the date
The contestant was eliminated
The contestant was eliminated during the date
The contestant was eliminated outside the rose ceremony
The contestant moved on to the next week by default
The contestant won the competition

== Episodes ==
No. overall	No. in season	Title	Original release date	Prod. code	U.S. viewers (millions)	Rating/share (18–49)
203	1	"Week 1: Season Premiere"	January 2, 2017	2101	6.62	2.1/6
Season 21 begins with Nick meeting with former Bachelors Sean Lowe, Chris Soules, and Ben Higgins at the mansion to get advice on finding love. Later that night, his journey begins as thirty single ladies arrive, many of them already familiar with Nick and his charms. Notable arrivals include: Christen, who brings a hand fan.; Lauren, who jokes with Nick.; Michelle, who drives an ice cream truck.; Olivia, who wears a fur coat.; Jasmine G., who surprises Nick with Neil Lane holding a present.; Astrid and Vanessa, who attempt to charm Nick by speaking in German and French, respectively.; Danielle M., who presents maple syrup from the factory where her dad works.; Raven, who demonstrates a "pig sooie" cheer.; Josephine, who holds a book with an uncooked hotdog.; Lacey, who rides a camel.; Alexis, who arrives wearing what she believes is a dolphin costume but is actually a shark costume, which amuses the other contestants.; Nick gives the first impression rose to Rachel. At the rose ceremony, Angela, Briana, Ida Marie, Jasmine B., Lauren, Michelle, Olivia, and Susannah are eliminated from the competition.
204	2	"Week 2"	January 9, 2017	2102	6.54	2.1/6
Nick selects twelve women for the first group date at the Ascona Mansion, where they take part in wedding photoshoots with photographer Franco Lacosta. Each woman is assigned a different wedding theme. During the date, Corinne, chosen for the beach wedding theme, makes a bold move by removing her top in the pool. Her daring approach earns her the opportunity to take a solo wedding photo with Nick, and she ultimately receives the group date rose. Danielle M. is chosen for the season's first one-on-one date. She and Nick take a helicopter ride to a houseboat near Newport Beach. They enjoy time together in a hot tub before heading to dinner on Balboa Island. Nick decides to give her the date rose, solidifying their connection. The second group date features six women who visit the Museum of Broken Relationships in Hollywood. During the date, the women act out "breakup" scenes with Nick. Liz uses this opportunity to reveal a secret: she had previously met Nick and slept with him at a wedding. This revelation leads to a tense and emotional interaction, ultimately prompting Nick to send her home. The episode ends with a dramatic cliffhanger.
205	3	"Week 3"	January 16, 2017	2103	7.11	2.3/7
At the cocktail party from the previous week, Corinne appears wearing only a trench coat while holding a can of whipped cream, making a bold impression. However, she ends up missing the rose ceremony because she oversleeps. Ultimately, Elizabeth, Hailey, and Lacey are eliminated. The first group date of the week begins with a surprise visit from the Backstreet Boys, who arrive at the mansion to greet the women. Seven women join Nick to rehearse a dance routine with the band in preparation for their performance that evening. During the show, Danielle L. is chosen to be serenaded in a private moment with Nick. He later gives her the group date rose. Vanessa is selected for the week’s one-on-one date. She and Nick experience a Zero-G flight simulator inside an airplane, providing them with a unique and memorable experience. Despite getting motion sickness and vomiting during the flight, Vanessa’s connection with Nick remains strong, and she receives a rose. The second group date features seven women competing in a "Nickathalon," a sports-themed challenge judged by Olympians Carl Lewis, Michelle Carter, and Allyson Felix. Astrid wins the competition and earns one-on-one time with Nick as her reward. However, Dominique struggles with her emotions, feeling left out and unappreciated. After expressing her concerns to Nick, he decides to send her home. Rachel receives the group date rose. Later, during a pool party at the mansion, Nick and Corinne spend time together in a bouncy house and share intimate moments, sparking tension among the other women. Many are visibly upset by the overt display of affection, and resentment toward Corinne continues to grow.
206	4	"Week 4: Milwaukee, Wisconsin"	January 23, 2017	2104	7.32	2.4/8
After breaking their silence about Corinne, the women prepare for the rose ceremony. Brittany and Christen are eliminated. The remaining fifteen women travel to Wisconsin, where Nick has the opportunity to chat with his parents at their home in Waukesha. Danielle L. has the first one-on-one date, and she and Nick take a stroll around his hometown, where they unexpectedly run into Nick's ex. Despite the awkward encounter, Danielle L. receives the rose, and they later attend a performance at the Pabst Theater where country singer Chris Lane performs. Thirteen women are chosen for the group date, where they get to work on a farm. Corinne resists the dirty nature of the work and doesn't fully embrace the activity, which leads to tension and distaste from the other women. Ultimately, Kristina receives the group date rose. Raven enjoys the second one-on-one date with Nick. They meet Nick's youngest sister at her soccer game before heading to a roller skating party. Raven impresses Nick, and she receives the rose at the end of the date. At the cocktail party, Taylor and Corinne have a heated argument, with Taylor accusing Corinne of rude behavior. The episode ends on a cliffhanger.
207	5	"Week 5: New Orleans"	January 30, 2017	2105	7.23	2.3/8
Concluding from the previous episode, Taylor and Corinne argue about their confrontation. At the rose ceremony, Astrid and Sarah are eliminated. The thirteen remaining women travel to New Orleans, Louisiana. Rachel receives the one-on-one date, where she and Nick go sightseeing in Downtown New Orleans. They dance together in a parade of street dancers and end the day with a private concert from singer Lolo. Rachel impresses Nick and receives the rose. Ten women participate in this week's group date, traveling to Houmas House Plantation. There, they encounter ghosts and hold a séance using a Ouija board. Danielle M. receives the group date rose. Taylor and Corinne face off on a two-on-one date to the Bayou, where they meet a group of voodoo worshipers and have a tarot card reading. Tensions grow between the two women, and Nick ultimately gives the rose to Corinne. Taylor is left stranded in the Bayou but makes her way back to Nick and Corinne. The episode ends on another cliffhanger.
208	6	"Week 6: St. Thomas"	February 6, 2017	2106	7.47	2.4/8
Concluding from the previous episode, Taylor interrupts Nick's one-on-one time with Corinne. The two have a tense conversation, and Taylor ultimately decides to leave for good. At the rose ceremony, Alexis, Jaimi, and Josephine are eliminated. The nine remaining women travel to Saint Thomas, U.S. Virgin Islands. Kristina receives the one-on-one date, where she and Nick take a seaplane ride to the abandoned ruins of Annaberg in nearby Saint John. She shares her adoption story with Nick and receives the rose. The six women chosen for the group date play volleyball with Nick on a sandy white beach. During the date, Jasmine G. sharply questions Nick about never having had a date of her own, becoming increasingly aggressive. As a result, Nick decides to send her home. Danielle L. and Whitney go on the two-on-one date, which takes them on a helicopter ride to an uninhabited island at Botany Bay. Whitney is left stranded on the beach, while Nick and Danielle L. continue their date at Fort Christian. In a surprising turn of events, Nick decides to send Whitney home as well. He then tearfully confesses to the remaining women that he feels overwhelmed by the process.
209	7	"Week 7: Bimini"	February 13, 2017	2107	7.56	2.4/8
Chris Harrison visits Nick and asks how he is doing. Nick responds that this might not be the best decision for him and considers quitting the show. After a lengthy conversation, Nick decides that he is ready to continue. He then visits the house and informs the women that they are heading to Bimini in The Bahamas, where they arrive barefoot. Vanessa receives the one-on-one date, which involves diving off the yacht and exploring the nearby abandoned SS Sapona ship. Corinne, Kristina, and Raven go on the group date and take a speedboat to go snorkeling. Raven receives the rose and later attends a performance by Adam Friedman outside the villa with Nick. Danielle M. and Nick have a one-on-one date, riding bicycles to the downtown area, where they shop, hang out, and play basketball. During their time together, Nick asks Danielle M. about her past relationships. After their conversation, Nick realizes that their chemistry isn't strong, and he sends her home. Corinne, realizing that there are only five women left and four hometown visits, goes to Nick's hotel room to be intimate with him, hoping to secure her spot in the final four. However, after some fooling around, Nick decides it is not a good idea and asks her to leave, leaving her devastated. Rachel receives a one-on-one date at a local bar. The date is relatively brief, but both seem to enjoy themselves. Later, Nick arrives at the hotel and asks to speak with Kristina. He tells her that he doesn’t feel like things are going to work out and unexpectedly sends her home. Kristina becomes the only woman this season to be eliminated outside of a rose ceremony or a date.
210	8	"Week 8: Hometowns"	February 20, 2017	2108	7.88	2.5/8
After Kristina's shocking elimination, the remaining women prepare for the rose ceremony. Nick arrives to give them the roses that secure their spots in the final four and grant them hometown dates. Raven's hometown date takes place in Hoxie, Arkansas, where she takes Nick on an ATV ride through a muddy field, and they climb into a silo. A police car drives by, which makes Nick nervous, but it turns out to be Raven's brother. Raven later receives the good news that her father is cancer-free. Next is Rachel's hometown date in Dallas, Texas, where she and Nick attend a Black church. Nick discusses the challenges often faced by interracial couples. Corinne's hometown date takes place in Miami, Florida, where she takes Nick shopping before he meets her family and nanny. The last hometown date is with Vanessa in Montreal, Quebec, where she takes Nick to the school where she works. She introduces him to her mother's side of the family and her siblings, and then separately to her father and his wife. In New York City, the women prepare for the upcoming rose ceremony, but a surprise visitor arrives at Nick's hotel room. It is revealed to be Andi Dorfman. The episode ends on a cliffhanger.
211	9	"Week 9: Fantasy Suites, Part 1"	February 27, 2017	2109A	7.71	2.4/9
After Andi enters Nick's hotel room, she offers him some advice. Nick then prepares for the rose ceremony, where he eliminates Corinne, who admits that she doesn't know what went wrong. Nick and the three remaining women travel to Lapland, Finland to begin the fantasy suite dates. Nick takes Raven on a helicopter ride over Urho Kekkonen National Park to sightsee and observe the wildlife, followed by a game of darts at an inn. Raven accepts the invitation to the fantasy suite.
212	10	"Week 9: Fantasy Suites, Part 2"	March 6, 2017	2109B	7.09	2.2/8
After Raven accepts the fantasy suite invitation, she and Nick have a conversation before she heads back to the hotel. Nick takes Rachel cross-country skiing, and then they enjoy a sleigh ride pulled by reindeer. Nick and Vanessa spend their date plunging into an icy river, followed by a run into a sauna. They also have a candid conversation in a hot tub. Both women accept the fantasy suite invitations. At the rose ceremony, Rachel is eliminated.
213	11	"The Women Tell All"	March 6, 2017	N/A	5.77	1.8/6
In the Women Tell All special, eighteen of the twenty-seven contestants return. Several of the contestants discuss their lives after the show. Liz takes the hot seat first and talks about her life since the show. Taylor and Corinne are next, due to their controversial two-on-one date, and Taylor apologizes to Corinne for her behavior. Kristina retells her adoption story. Nick then joins and answers questions from the ladies. Finally, new Bachelorette Rachel makes a brief appearance, and Nick congratulates her and wishes her luck.
214	12	"Week 10: Season Finale"	March 13, 2017	2110	8.40	2.7/9
Nick has the opportunity to introduce both Raven and Vanessa to his family at the lodge in Rovaniemi, Finland. Both women leave positive impressions and feel confident in their relationships with Nick. Vanessa's final date involves a horseback ride along a snowy road, after which she and Nick visit a cabin to meet Santa Claus. Raven's final date includes ice skating on a frozen lake, which brings back memories of her first one-on-one date in Wisconsin. They conclude the night by camping and enjoying a bonfire. Neil Lane visits the lodge to see Nick, who is ready to make his decision. At the final rose ceremony, Nick tells Raven that their relationship cannot continue, and she is eliminated. When Vanessa arrives, Nick gets down on one knee, professes his love for her, and proposes. Vanessa accepts the proposal.
215	13	"After the Final Rose"	March 13, 2017	N/A	7.85	2.4/8
Nick sits down to discuss his experience during the final weeks of the show. Raven confesses that she did feel heartbroken when her relationship with Nick ended. Chris asks her to give love another shot on Bachelor in Paradise, and she agrees. Vanessa sits down and explains that her relationship with Nick became open, stable, and truly emotional. She plans to move to America and establish a charity to support people with learning disabilities. New Bachelorette Rachel makes her second appearance, excited about starting her own journey, and four men come in to meet her for the first time.

== Post-show ==
Nick and Vanessa announced their breakup on August 25, 2017.

Vanessa married Josh Wolfe on August 20, 2021. They have one son together, Winston Franco, who was born on September 29, 2022.

Nick made a cameo on the season 18 Family Guy episode, "Yacht Rocky". Peter talks to Nick and inquires about him and Vanessa, to which says that they broke up. Peter then says that he would "murder his family for one hour with Corinne".
