= Van Lathan =

American journalist

- Lathan in 2026
- Born: April 16, 1980 (age 46); Baton Rouge, Louisiana, U.S.
- Education: Southern University (BA)
- Employer: TMZ (2011-2019)

Van Lathan Jr. (born April 16, 1980) is an American journalist, producer, podcaster, and political commentator.

He worked as a senior producer and cohost on TMZ when he came into prominence for confronting Kanye West during a 2018 interview with TMZ for his comments regarding slavery in the United States. After leaving TMZ in 2019, he went on to produce several films, including Two Distant Strangers, which won the award for Best Live Action Short Film at the 93rd Academy Awards and Best Short Film from the African-American Film Critics Association.

He is also the host of the television series Hip Hop Homicides and the host of various podcasts, including The Red Pill Podcast, The Wire: Way Down in the Hole with Jemele Hill, The Midnight Boys, and Higher Learning with Rachel Lindsay, the latter of which has been nominated on multiple occasions for the NAACP Image Awards. Except for The Red Pill, all of his podcasts are part of The Ringer podcast network.

In addition to his recent work in media, he has also been featured as a panelist for CNN NewsNight with Abby Phillip. In 2022, Lathan released his memoir, Fat, Crazy, and Tired: Tales from the Trenches of Transformation.

== Biography ==
Lathan was born on April 16, 1980, in Baton Rouge, Louisiana. His father, Van Terry Lathan Sr., was a self employed contractor and his mother, Chrystal Ellis, a loan officer. He attended McKinley High School in Baton Rouge and graduated with his bachelors from Southern University.

=== TMZ ===
Starting around 2010, Lathan worked at TMZ as a senior producer and host on TMZ Live. While working as a senior producer, TMZ, in 2018, set up an interview with Kanye West. This interview came under the backdrop of comments made by West at the time surrounding his support of Donald Trump, among other controversial statements. During the course of the interview, West stated: "When you hear about slavery for 400 years ... for 400 years? That sounds like a choice..." After West finished his comments, Lathan came onto the set where the interview was being made and strongly rebutted West's comments. Among other things, he stated that West's comments were indicative of the "absence of thought", that "While you [West] are making music and being an artist and living a life that you’ve earned by being a genius, the rest of us in society have to deal with these threats to our lives", and that he was "appalled" and "unbelievably hurt" by his comments.

His rebuttal was widely supported, receiving applause from his coworkers while the interaction was unfolding and later lauded by a number of public figures. Lathan would later remark that West had made other comments stating his love for Hitler and for Nazis that were edited out before publication. In October 2019, he was let go from TMZ after an incident with coworker Michael Babcock. Lathan would later share that he had already informed TMZ prior to the incident that he would not be renewing his contract, which was set to expire in November of that year. Due to this and the being on good terms with Babcock, Lathan speculates that his firing was a way for TMZ to avoid paying the remainder of his contract.

=== Film production and TV ===
After being let go from TMZ, Lathan began to produce films, co-founding the production company Six Feet Over with one of the directors of Two Distant Strangers, Travon Free, and Nicholas Maye. He was the executive producer for Uppity: The Willy T. Ribbs Story, Two Distant Strangers, and Once Again (For the Very First Time). Two Distant Strangers, which was released on Netflix in 2020 and dealt with systemic racism and police brutality, was widely critically acclaimed. The film would go on to win the award for Best Live Action Short Film at the 93rd Academy Awards and Best Short Film from the African-American Film Critics Association.

In 2022, Lathan hosted the series Hip Hop Homicides, which explored the unsolved murders of prominent hip-hop artists.

Starting in 2024, Lathan has been featured as a panelist on the current incarnation of CNN NewsNight, hosted by Abby Phillip. That same year, he was interviewed as part of the documentary Black Twitter: A People's History.

=== Podcasts ===
Beginning in February 2018, Lathan hosted The Red Pill podcast, on which he discussed the interaction with West in its immediate aftermath. He last posted an episode in late December 2019.

Starting in 2020, he became involved with 'The Ringer' podcast network. This included The Wire: Down in the Hole with Jemele Hill, where they reviewed every episode of the hit series The Wire. He also currently hosts The Midnight Boys with Charles Holmes, Jomi Adeniran, and Steve Ahlman, where they discuss films, TV, and pop culture.

He would go on to host Higher Learning with Rachel Lindsay. In the podcast, the two cohosts delve into topics including Black culture, politics, sports, and current events. The podcast has been nominated for the Outstanding Society and Culture Podcast award at the NAACP Image Awards for their 54th, 55th, and 56th editions. They celebrated the 5th anniversary of the podcast in May 2025 on the floor of the New York Stock Exchange.

=== Personal life ===
Lathan currently resides in Los Angeles. He is a fan of Star Wars.

In 2022, Lathan released his memoir, Fat, Crazy, and Tired: Tales from the Trenches of Transformation.

== Filmography ==
=== As producer ===
Year	Title	Notes
2020	Uppity: The Willy T. Ribbs Story	Executive producer
2020	Two Distant Strangers	Executive producer
2023	Once Again (For the Very First Time)	Executive producer

=== As an actor ===
Year	Title	Notes
2019	High Flying Bird	Himself
2022	Inside Amy Schumer	1 episode
