= Yuki Kimura =

Japanese model and tarento (born 1996)

- 木村 有希
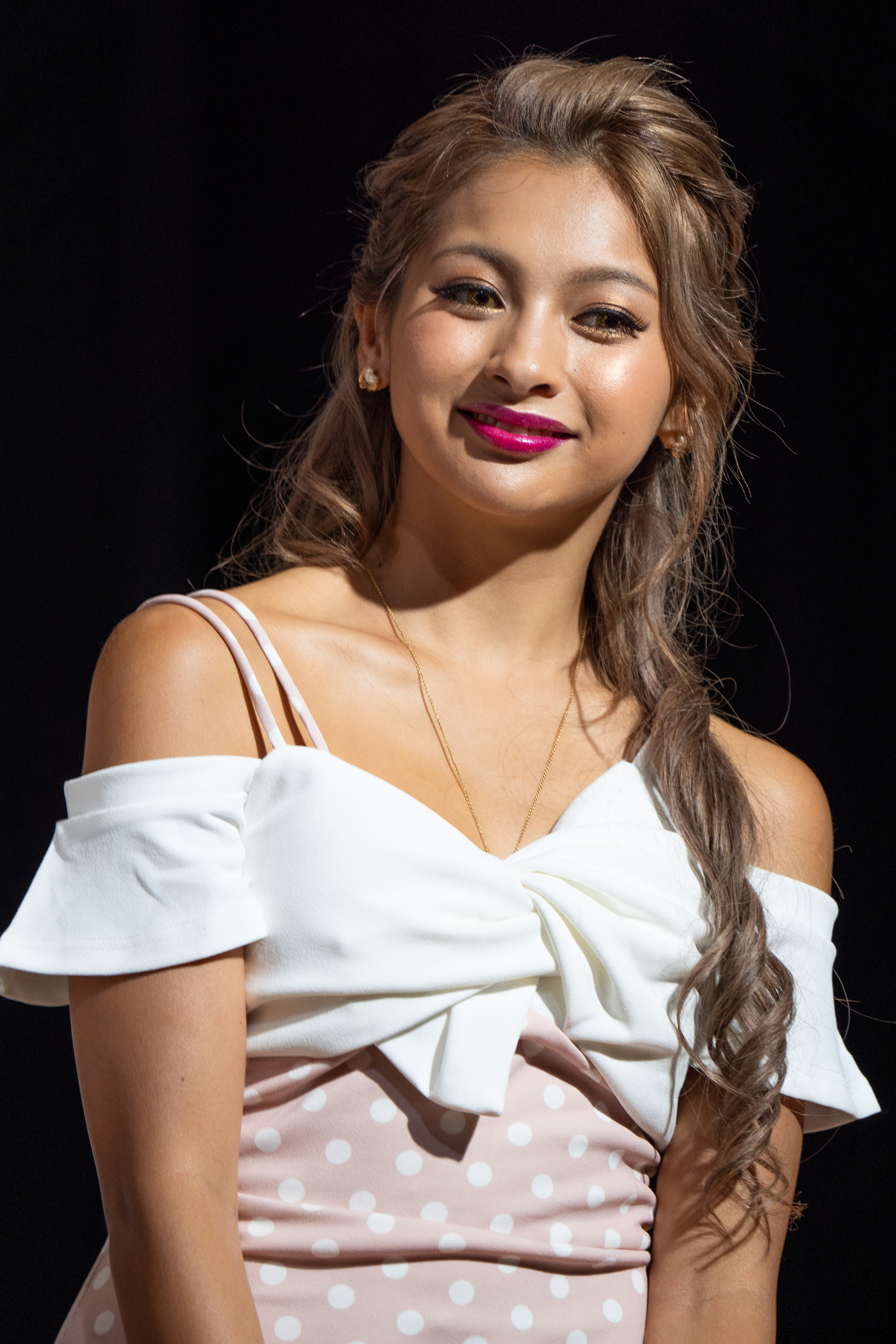
- Kimura in September 2019
- Born: October 23, 1996 (age 29); Kanagawa Prefecture, Japan
- Other name: Yukipoyo
- Occupations: Model; tarento
- Years active: 2012–present
- Agent: VIP Model Agency
- Height: 1.58 m (5 ft 2 in)

Yuki Kimura (木村 有希, Kimura Yuki; born October 23, 1996 in Kanagawa Prefecture) is a Japanese fashion model and tarento. She is better known by her stage name Yukipoyo (ゆきぽよ). She is represented by her agency VIP Models Agency.

== Biography ==
Kimura was born on October 23, 1996, in Kanagawa Prefecture, to a Japanese father and a Filipina mother. According to Kimura, her mother is of partial Spanish ancestry.

== Career ==
Kimura debuted as a reader model for the fashion magazine, egg in 2012. She also thrived on the video platform Vine, with over 60 million total views. She was a participant of The Bachelor Japan, aired on Amazon Prime Video in 2017 and The Bachelor Winter Games in 2018. By late 2018, Kimura had become active as a television personality, with numerous appearances on various variety programs.

== Media ==
=== Television ===
- The Bachelor Winter Games (ABC)
- Jinsei ga Kawaru Ippunkan no Fukaīhanashi (人生が変わる1分間の深イイ話) (Nippon TV)
- Konya Kurabete Mimashita (今夜くらべてみました) (Nippon TV)
- Downtown DX (ダウンタウンDX) (Yomiuri TV)
- Hirunandesu! (ヒルナンデス!) (Nippon TV)
- Chōmon Quiz (超問クイズ) (Nippon TV)

=== Film ===
- Detective of Joshidaikoji (2023)

=== Web series ===
- The Bachelor Japan (バチェラー・ジャパン) (Amazon Prime Video, 2017-2018)

=== Photobooks ===
- Yukipoyogram (ゆきぽよ写真集) (2019/01/18)

=== DVD ===
- YukipoyoTube (2019/02/17)
