= Higher Learning (podcast) =

- Genre: Culture, entertainment, current events
- Language: English

Creative team
- Created by: Van Lathan; Rachel Lindsay

Cast and voices
- Hosted by: Van Lathan; Rachel Lindsay

Publication
- No. of seasons: 1
- No. of episodes: 299
- Original release: May 28, 2020
- Provider: Spotify; The Ringer
- Updates: 2 episodes a week

Related
- Website: https://www.theringer.com/podcasts/higher-learning-van-lathan-rachel-lindsay

Higher Learning with Van Lathan and Rachel Lindsay is a podcast hosted by Van Lathan and Rachel Lindsay. In the podcast, the two cohosts delve into topics including Black culture, politics, sports, and current events. The podcast is distributed on Spotify through The Ringer.

== History ==
Higher Learning came to be after Lindsay met Bill Simmons of The Ringer after being interviewed by Juliet Litman on the Bachelor Party podcast. She went on to work for The Ringer when Simmons pitched the idea of her own project in the company, later introducing her to Lathan. Initially intended to be released in March 2020, the release was delayed to May 2020 due to the COVID-19 pandemic. This delay also changed the subject matter of the podcast to topics around Black culture in light of the George Floyd protests.

In the podcast, Lathan and Lindsey delve into entertainment, politics, and current events through a Black perspective, with them also recounting their personal experiences and insights on various topics. The podcast was one of the first on Spotify to include video.

Higher Learning has been nominated for the Outstanding Society and Culture Podcast award at the NAACP Image Awards for their 54th, 55th, and 56th editions. They celebrated the 5th year anniversary of the podcast in May 2025 on the floor of the New York Stock Exchange.
