= The Bachelor Winter Games =

Reality television series

- Genre: Reality competition
- Presented by: Chris Harrison; Hannah Storm
- Country of origin: United States
- Original language: English
- No. of seasons: 1
- No. of episodes: 5

Production
- Executive producers: Mike Fleiss; Martin Hilton
- Production location: Manchester, Vermont
- Production companies: Next Entertainment; Warner Horizon Television

Original release
- Network: ABC
- Release: February 13 – February 22, 2018

Related
- The Bachelor; The Bachelorette; Bachelor in Paradise

The Bachelor Winter Games is a winter sports-themed reality competition television series that premiered on February 13, 2018, on ABC. It is a spin-off of the reality television game shows The Bachelor and The Bachelorette, and is a winter counterpart to the summer series Bachelor in Paradise. The show is hosted by Chris Harrison and Hannah Storm of ABC’s sister station ESPN. It has been described by ABC as "an ode to the Winter Olympic Games", and aired as counterprogramming against NBC's coverage of the 2018 Winter Olympics. Ashley Brewer presents the play-by-play and live interviews during the games.

The series reunite previous contestants from The Bachelor and The Bachelorette at a winter resort in Manchester, Vermont, where they are competing with contestants from the various international adaptations of the franchise in various winter sports challenges.

== Contestants ==
Name	Age	Residence	From	Eliminated
Ashley Iaconetti	29	Los Angeles, California	The Bachelor – Chris; Bachelor in Paradise – Season 2 and 3	Winner; Relationship
Kevin Wendt	33	Waterloo, Ontario	The Bachelorette Canada	Winner; Relationship
Courtney Dober	31	Sydney, New South Wales	The Bachelorette Australia	Relationship
Lily McManus-Semchyshyn	21	Auckland, New Zealand	The Bachelor New Zealand	Relationship
Dean Unglert	26	Venice, California	The Bachelorette – Rachel; Bachelor in Paradise – Season 4	Relationship
Lesley Murphy	30	Fort Smith, Arkansas	The Bachelor – Sean	Relationship
Luke Pell	33	Nashville, Tennessee	The Bachelorette – JoJo	Relationship
Nastassia "Stassi" Yaramchuk	26	Malmö, Sweden	The Bachelor Sweden	Relationship
Bibiana Julian	30	Miami, Florida	The Bachelor – Arie	Split Episode 4
Jordan Mauger	34	Auckland, New Zealand	The Bachelor New Zealand	Split Episode 4
Ally Thompson	24	Nelson, New Zealand	The Bachelor New Zealand	Episode 3
Josiah Graham	29	Plantation, Florida	The Bachelorette – Rachel	Episode 3
Christian Rauch	34	Berlin, Germany	The Bachelorette Germany; The Bachelorette Switzerland	Split Episode 3
Clare Crawley	36	Sacramento, California	The Bachelor – Juan Pablo; Bachelor in Paradise – Season 1 and 2	Split Episode 3
Yuki Kimura	21	Atsugi, Kanagawa	The Bachelor Japan	Episode 3
Michael Garofola	37	Houston, Texas	The Bachelorette – Desiree; Bachelor in Paradise – Season 2	Episode 3 (Quit)
Ben Higgins	28	Denver, Colorado	The Bachelorette – Kaitlyn; The Bachelor — Season 20	Episode 3 (Quit)
Tiffany Scanlon	31	Perth, Western Australia	The Bachelor Australia	Episode 3 (Quit)
Jenny Helenius	34	Helsinki, Finland	The Bachelor Finland	Episode 2
Rebecca Carlson	26	Stockholm, Sweden	The Bachelor Sweden	Episode 2
Benoit Beauséjour-Savard	30	Montreal, Quebec	The Bachelorette Canada	Episode 2 (Quit)
Eric Bigger	29	Baltimore, Maryland	The Bachelorette − Rachel	Episode 1
Jamey Kocan	33	Santa Monica, California	The Bachelorette – Rachel	Episode 1
Laura Blair	29	Wirral, England	The Bachelor UK	Episode 1
Lauren Griffin	26	Los Angeles, California	The Bachelor – Arie	Episode 1
Zoe Tang	25	Shenzhen, China	The Bachelor China	Episode 1

== Elimination table ==
Place	Contestant	Episode			
Place	Contestant	1	2	3	4
1st	Ashley	Last	In	Date	Winner
1st	Kevin	Date	In	Date	Winner
2nd	Courtney	In	In	In	Runner-up
2nd	Lily	In	In	In	Runner-up
2nd	Dean	In	Date	Last	Runner-up
2nd	Lesley	In	Date	Last	Runner-up
2nd	Luke	Date	Date	In	Runner-up
2nd	Stassi	In	Date	In	Runner-up
9-10	Bibiana	Date	In	In	Split
9-10	Jordan	N/A (Note: Contestant was not in the competition yet.)	In	In	Split
11–12	Ally	In	In	Out	
11–12	Josiah	Last	In	Out	
13–14	Christian	In	In	Split	
13–14	Clare	In	Last	Split	
15	Yuki	In	In	Out	
16	Michael	In	In	Quit	
17	Ben	In	In	Quit	
18	Tiffany	In	In	Quit	
19–20	Jenny	In	Out		
19–20	Rebecca	Date	Out		
21	Benoit	In	Quit		
22–26	Eric	Out			
22–26	Jamey	Out			
22–26	Laura	Out			
22–26	Lauren	Out			
22–26	Zoe	Out			

=== Key ===
The contestant is male.
The contestant is female.
The couple won Bachelor Winter Games.
The couples were the runner-ups.
Date The contestant went on a date and gave out a rose at the rose ceremony.
Date The contestant went on a date and got a rose at the rose ceremony.
Date The contestant won the Winter competition, then went on a date and gave out a rose at the rose ceremony.
Date The contestant won the Winter competition, then went on a date and got a rose at the rose ceremony.
In The contestant gave or received a rose at the rose ceremony, thus remaining in the competition.
Last The contestant won the Winter competition, then went on a date and received the last rose.
Last The contestant received the last rose.
Split The couple broke up and were eliminated.
Quit The contestant voluntarily left the show.
Out The contestant had to leave the show due to not having a relationship.
Out The contestant was eliminated.

== Ratings ==
Viewership and ratings per episode of The Bachelor Winter Games
No.	Title	Air date	Timeslot (ET)	Rating/share (18–49)	Viewers (millions)
1	"Episode 1"	February 13, 2018	Tuesday 8:00 p.m.	0.8/3	3.01
2	"Episode 2"	February 15, 2018	Thursday 8:00 p.m.	0.7/3	3.02
3	"Episode 3"	February 20, 2018	Tuesday 8:00 p.m.	0.9/3	3.26
4	"Episode 4"	February 22, 2018	Thursday 8:00 p.m.	0.8/3	3.19
5	"Episode 5"	February 22, 2018	Thursday 10:00 p.m.	0.6/2	2.68
