= Rachel Lindsay (television personality) =

American media personality and attorney (born 1985)

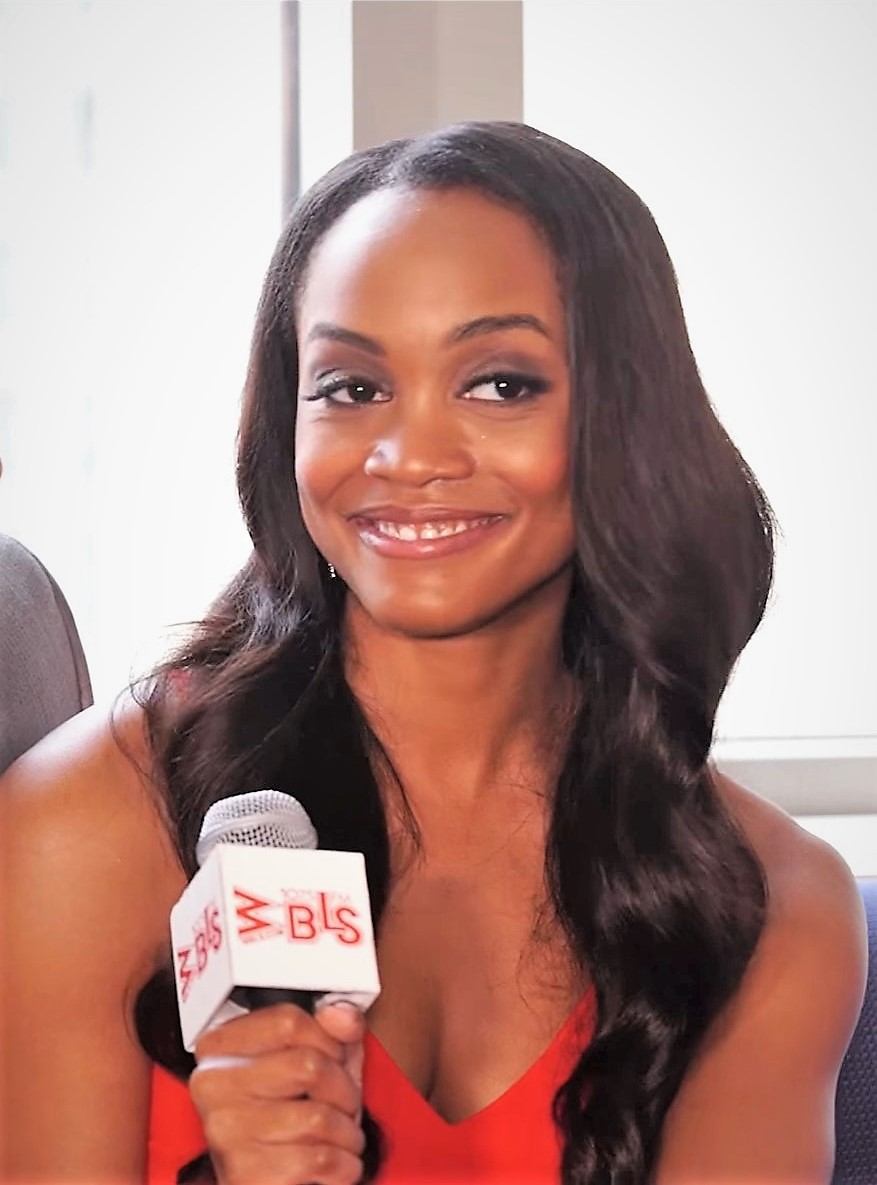
- Lindsay interviewed by WBLS in 2017
- Born: Rachel Lynn Lindsay; April 21, 1985 (age 41); Dallas, Texas, U.S.
- Education: University of Texas, Austin (BS); Marquette University (JD)
- Spouse: Bryan Abasolo (m. 2019; div. 2025)
- Father: Sam A. Lindsay

Rachel Lynn Lindsay (born April 21, 1985) is an American media personality, attorney and podcaster. She is best known for her role as a contestant on the twenty-first season of ABC's The Bachelor and as the lead of its spinoff, The Bachelorette, in its thirteenth season. She was the first African-American lead in The Bachelor franchise. She was a correspondent for Extra from 2020 to 2023, and is a co-host of the Higher Learning podcast alongside Van Lathan on The Ringer platform. Lindsay was also a partial owner of the FCF Shoulda Been Stars Indoor Football Team.

== Early life and education ==
Born and raised in Dallas, Lindsay is the daughter of beauty consultant and former computer programmer Kathy and federal judge Sam A. Lindsay. She has an older sister, Constance, and a younger sister, Heather.

Lindsay obtained her Bachelor's degree from The University of Texas at Austin where she studied kinesiology and sports management and is a member of Delta Sigma Theta sorority. She received her J.D. degree from Marquette University in Milwaukee, Wisconsin. Lindsay became licensed to practice law in the state of Texas on November 4, 2011.

== Career ==
Lindsay worked as a legislative intern for Texas State Senator Royce West and had interned with the Milwaukee Bucks. She then worked at the law firm Cooper & Scully, P.C.

In July 2018, Lindsay was a guest host on ESPN's First Take. Later that year, she started hosting Football Frenzy, a new ESPN radio show, alongside former Dallas Cowboys linebacker Bobby Carpenter. She was also a cheerleader for the team when she was a teenager.

In May 2020, Lindsay launched a podcast Higher Learning with co-host Van Lathan. In the podcast, the two cohosts delve into topics including Black culture, politics, sports, and current events. The podcast has been nominated for the Outstanding Society and Culture Podcast award at the NAACP Image Awards for their 54th, 55th, and 56th editions. They celebrated the 5th year anniversary of the podcast in May 2025 on the floor of the New York Stock Exchange.

She has also been a co-host of the Bachelor Happy Hour podcast. She left Bachelor Happy Hour in April 2021 after announcing her departure from the Bachelor franchise.

Lindsay was one of five partial owners of the FCF Wild Aces, an indoor football team that was part of Fan Controlled Football. After the team disbanded, she continued her role as partial owner of the team's new iteration, the FCF Shoulda Been Stars.

On January 25, 2022, she released her book, Miss Me with That: Hot Takes, Helpful Tidbits, and a Few Hard Truths.

== Television shows ==
=== The Bachelor ===
Lindsay was a contestant on Nick Viall's season of The Bachelor. She received the first impression rose on night one. She placed third overall, losing to runner-up Raven Gates and winner Vanessa Grimaldi.

=== The Bachelorette ===
Lindsay was announced as the Bachelorette on February 13, 2017, while she was still in contention for Nick Viall's final rose. For Lindsay's season ABC had cast the most diverse cast in Bachelor franchise history. In the end, Lindsay chose Miami native Bryan Abasolo, a doctor of chiropractic, over Peter Kraus. The engaged couple lived in Dallas before moving to Miami in early 2019. They married in August 2019. On January 2, 2024, it was announced that Abasolo filed for divorce, citing separation beginning December 31, 2023.

Lindsay returned with Abasolo during Becca Kufrin's season of The Bachelorette to host the first group date. She also made an appearance during season 16 of The Bachelorette which first featured Clare Crawley as the lead followed by Tayshia Adams.

=== Other television appearances ===
Lindsay appeared in one episode of The Bachelor Winter Games where she judged a kissing contest along with JoJo Fletcher and Arie Luyendyk.

On September 10, 2019, Ghosted: Love Gone Missing premiered on MTV, the series is hosted by Lindsay alongside artist and actor Travis Mills. In this series, Mills and Lindsay assist people in confronting former friends or partners after being ghosted.

In May 2020, it was announced that Lindsay was in talks with 20th Television to host and co-executive produce a syndicated court show, Judge Rachel's Court, which debuted in September 2021.

Lindsay started working for Extra as a special correspondent in 2019. In August 2020, it was announced that she would be a full-time correspondent for season 27. She started her tenure on September 8.

Rachel had a supporting role in the Lifetime movie Devil on My Doorstep that premiered in 2023.

== Personal life ==
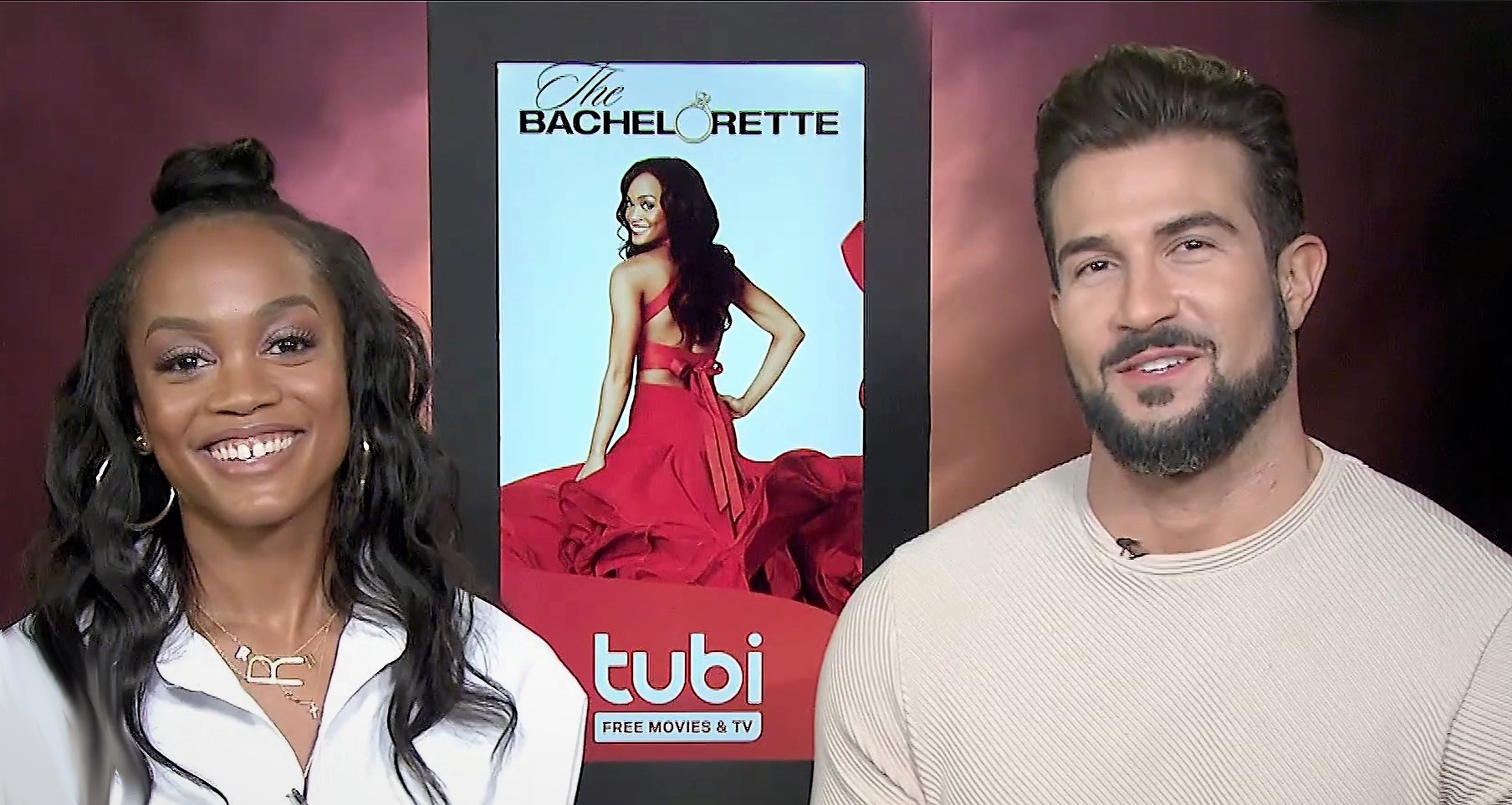
Lindsay and Bryan Abasolo in 2019

Lindsay was married to Bryan Abasolo, who won Season 13 of The Bachelorette. She and Abasolo married on August 24, 2019, in Cancun, Mexico. On January 2, 2024, it was announced Abasolo filed for divorce on December 31, 2023.

Preceded by JoJo Fletcher	The Bachelorette; Season 13	Succeeded by Becca Kufrin
