= Nick Viall =

American television personality

- Born: Nicholas Joseph Viall; September 28, 1980 (age 45); Waukesha, Wisconsin, U.S.
- Education: University of Wisconsin–Milwaukee
- Occupations: Software sales, actor, television personality, model
- Known for: Appearances on The Bachelor franchise, The Viall Files podcast
- Height: 6 ft 2 in (1.88 m)
- Spouse: Natalie Joy (m. 2024)
- Children: 3

Nicholas Joseph Viall (born September 28, 1980) is an American actor, television personality and model who had a starring role on the 21st season of ABC's The Bachelor, after finishing as runner-up in two consecutive seasons of The Bachelorette.

== Early life and education ==
Viall was born in Waukesha, Wisconsin, to parents Mary and Christopher. He is the second oldest of 11 siblings.

He graduated Waukesha North High School in 1999, where he ran track and field and won the 800-meter run at WIAA State Track & Field Championships in the same year. He then attended University of Wisconsin–Milwaukee, where he served as team captain and set a school record in the 3,200-meter relay.

== Television show appearances ==
=== Reality television ===
==== The Bachelorette ====
Viall first appeared as a contestant in the ABC reality show The Bachelorette in 2014, as one of Andi Dorfman's suitors. On the first night, he received the first impression rose. In the final dates, he confessed his love for Dorfman as one of the final two bachelors, but left heartbroken when Dorfman chose Josh Murray to receive the final rose.

In 2015, Viall returned for a second chance in the following season of The Bachelorette, when he was a guest in the fourth week at the New York City date with Bachelorette Kaitlyn Bristowe. He asked her to give him a chance, and she accepted his request to be part of the cast. Like the previous season, he made it to the final rose ceremony but ended in proposal rejection when Bristowe chose Shawn Booth.

==== Bachelor in Paradise ====
Viall returned to reality TV once again as a part for the third season in Bachelor in Paradise. In the second episode, when he was asked on a date by The Bachelor season 20 contestant Leah Block, Viall accepted. Viall later asked fellow contestant Amanda Stanton on a date, much to Block's annoyance. After Stanton began a relationship with contestant Josh Murray, Viall went on to date Jen Saviano. The relationship between Saviano and Viall appeared to be progressing well, with Viall selecting an engagement ring with Neil Lane for a second time. However, at the final ceremony, Viall said, "I wanted to say I was in love with you, but something in my heart just said I can't," resulting in no proposal.

==== The Bachelor ====
In August 2016, Viall was announced as the star of the twenty-first season of The Bachelor on the fourth episode of the second season of Bachelor in Paradise: After Paradise. He was chosen despite not being a fan favorite to star on the show, beating contenders Chase McNary and Luke Pell, both from The Bachelorette season 12. In the first episode, Viall revealed that he had thirty women on the show, instead of the usual twenty-five. Viall proposed to contestant Vanessa Grimaldi, a special education teacher from Montreal, Quebec, Canada in the season finale. They broke up the following August.

==== Dancing with the Stars ====
Viall became a contestant on the ABC reality show Dancing with the Stars and his partner is professional ballroom dancer Peta Murgatroyd along with 11 other celebrity contestants, which was announced by Good Morning America on March 1, 2017. He was eliminated from the competition on May 1.

==== Patti Stanger: The Matchmaker ====
Viall co-hosts with Patti Stanger the dating series Patti Stanger: The Matchmaker, which premiered on The CW on April 11, 2024.

==== The Secret Lives of Mormon Wives ====
Viall hosted the season 2 reunion of the reality series The Secret Lives of Mormon Wives. The reunion premiered on Hulu on July 1, 2025. 25

==== Age of Attraction ====
Viall was a co-host of Season 1 of Age of Attraction, a dating reality show about couples with age gaps. Viall was co-host with his wife, Natalie Joy, who is 18 years younger than Viall.

=== Acting career ===
Viall made his acting debut in the 2017 Christmas television movie A Christmas Cruise, starring Vivica A. Fox, and has made guest television appearances in ABC's Speechless, and TV Land's Teachers. He also appeared on episodes of General Hospital in May 2018 for the Nurse's Ball.

== Personal life ==
Viall was engaged to Vanessa Grimaldi from November 2016 to August 2017.

He began dating model and surgical technologist Natalie Joy in July 2020. They met when Joy sent an Instagram message to Viall. They announced their engagement on January 12, 2023. On February 2, 2024, Joy gave birth to a daughter named River Rose Viall. Viall and Joy married in April 2024. In February 2026, they announced that Joy was pregnant with twin daughters.

== Other ventures ==
=== Podcast ===
In January 2019, Viall started a podcast called The Viall Files that hosts many other celebrity guests.

=== Natural Habits Essential Oils ===
In 2018, Viall and his sister launched an essential oils company called Natural Habits.

== Filmography ==
=== Television ===
Year	Title	Role	Notes
2014–15	The Bachelorette	Contestant	Seasons 10 and 11; 21 episodes
2016	Bachelor in Paradise	Contestant	Season 3; 11 episodes
2017	The Bachelor	Lead	Season 21; 13 episodes
2017	Dancing with the Stars	Contestant	Season 24; 6th place
2017	Speechless	Tyson	Episode: "B-i-Bikini U-n-University"
2017	A Christmas Cruise	Bob	TV movie
2018	General Hospital	Nick	Episode: #1.14082
2018	Teachers	John	Episode: "Wake and Blake"
2019	Family Guy	Nick	Episode: "Yacht Rocky"; voice role
2023	The Masked Singer	Self	Episode: "ABBA Night"
2023	Special Forces: World's Toughest Test	Contestant	Season 2; 8 episodes
2024	Patti Stanger: The Matchmaker	Co-host	
2025–present	The Secret Lives of Mormon Wives	Host	Season 2, Episode 11
2026	Age of Attraction	Co-Host	Season 1

Preceded by Drew Kenney	The Bachelorette runner up Season 10 & Season 11	Succeeded by Robby Hayes
Preceded by Ben Higgins	The Bachelor; Season 21	Succeeded by Arie Luyendyk Jr.
