= The Bachelor (American TV series) season 18 =

Season of television series

The Bachelor
- Season 18
- Promotional poster
- Starring: Juan Pablo Galavis
- Presented by: Chris Harrison
- No. of contestants: 27
- Winner: Nikki Ferrell
- Runner-up: Clare Crawley
- No. of episodes: 12 (including 2 specials)

Release
- Original network: ABC
- Original release: January 6 – March 10, 2014

Additional information
- Filming dates: September 16 – November 13, 2013

Season chronology
- ← Previous; Season 17 Next → Season 19

The eighteenth season of The Bachelor premiered on January 6, 2014. This season features 32-year-old Juan Pablo Galavis, a former Venezuelan professional soccer player from Miami, Florida. Galavis finished in seventh place on the ninth season of The Bachelorette featuring Desiree Hartsock. He is the first Latino lead. The season concluded on March 10, 2014, with Galavis choosing to pursue a relationship with 26-year-old pediatric nurse Nikki Ferrell. They ended their relationship in October 2014.

There are 4 Sunday special episodes during the month of January 2014 as follows:

- January 5 – Countdown to Juan Pablo
- January 12 – Behind the Scenes of this season

== Production ==
=== Casting ===
Casting began during the airing of the seventeenth season of the show. Galavis was instantly chosen during the season finale of The Bachelorette.

=== Filming and development ===
The season travelled to locales including Utah, South Korea, Vietnam, New Zealand, Florida, and Saint Lucia. With performances such as 2NE1, Romeo Santos, and Josh Krajcik.

== Contestants ==
Unlike previous seasons, there are 27 contestants competing the show, for the first time since Rome. Biographical information according to ABC official series site, which gives first names only. Plus footnoted additions.

| Name | Age | Hometown | Occupation | Outcome | Place |
|---|---|---|---|---|---|
| Nikki Ferrell | 26 | Kearney, Missouri | Pediatric Nurse | Winner | 1 |
| Clare Crawley | 32 | Sacramento, California | Hairstylist | Runner-up | 2 |
| Andi Dorfman | 26 | Buckhead, Georgia | Assistant District Attorney | Week 9 | 3 (quit) |
| Renee Oteri | 32 | Martha's Vineyard, Massachusetts | Real Estate Agent | Week 8 | 4 |
| Chelsie Webster | 24 | Lexington, Ohio | Science Educator | Week 7 | 5 |
| Sharleen Joynt | 29 | Ottawa, Ontario (Note: Sharleen Joynt is originally from Ottawa, Ontario in Canada but was residing in Heidelberg, Germany at the time of casting and filming.) | Opera Singer | Week 7 | 6 (quit) |
| Katherine "Kat" Hurd | 29 | Iowa City, Iowa | Medical Sales Rep | Week 6 | 7 |
| Cassandra Ferguson | 22 | Rochester Hills, Michigan | Former NBA Dancer | Week 6 | 8 |
| Allison "Alli" Restko | 26 | Orland Park, Illinois | Nanny | Week 5 | 9–11 |
| Danielle Ronco | 25 | Litchfield, Illinois | Psychiatric Nurse | Week 5 | 9–11 |
| Kelly Travis | 27 | Conyers, Georgia | Dog Lover | Week 5 | 9–11 |
| Elise Mosca | 27 | Forty Fort, Pennsylvania | First Grade Teacher | Week 4 | 12–13 |
| Lauren Solomon | 26 | Clinton, Michigan | Music Composer | Week 4 | 12–13 |
| Christy Hansen | 24 | Aurora, Illinois | Marketing Manager | Week 3 | 14–15 |
| Lucinda "Lucy" Aragon | 25 | Santa Barbara, California | Free Spirit | Week 3 | 14–15 |
| Amy Long | 27 | Clermont, Florida | Local News Reporter | Week 2 | 16–17 |
| Chantel Forrest | 27 | Miami, Florida | Account Manager | Week 2 | 16–17 |
| Victoria Lima | 24 | Porto Alegre, Brazil (Note: Victoria is originally from Porto Alegre in Brazil, but was residing in Fort Lauderdale, Florida at the time of casting and filming.) | Legal Assistant | Week 2 | 18 |
| Alexis Morgado | 24 | Tampa, Florida | Communications Director | Week 1 | 19–27 |
| Amy Jokinen | 31 | Apopka, Florida | Massage Therapist | Week 1 | 19–27 |
| Ashley Poe | 25 | Roanoke, Texas | Grade School Teacher | Week 1 | 19–27 |
| Christine Llano | 23 | Miami, Florida | Police Support Specialist | Week 1 | 19–27 |
| Kylie Lewis | 23 | Rockford, Illinois | Interior Designer | Week 1 | 19–27 |
| Lacy Faddoul | 25 | Antelope Acres, California | Nursing Home Owner | Week 1 | 19–27 |
| Lauren Higginson | 25 | Edmond, Oklahoma | Mineral Coordinator | Week 1 | 19–27 |
| Maggie Gantt | 25 | Wagener, South Carolina | Personal Banker | Week 1 | 19–27 |
| Valerie Eredia | 26 | Sutter, California | Personal Trainer | Week 1 | 19–27 |

=== Future appearances ===
==== The Bachelorette ====
Andi Dorfman was chosen as the lead for the tenth season of The Bachelorette. She ended the season engaged to Josh Murray. They announced their breakup on January 8, 2015.

Clare Crawley was chosen as the lead for the sixteenth season of The Bachelorette. She got engaged to Dale Moss in the fourth episode. They broke up in January 2021. They got back together, but broke up for good in September 2021.

==== Bachelor in Paradise ====
Season 1

Clare, Lacy Faddoul, Christy Hansen, Elise Mosca, Danielle Ronco, and Lucy Aragon returned for the first season of Bachelor in Paradise. Elise and Clare quit in week 3 and week 5, respectively. Danielle was eliminated in week 3 and Lucy in week 5. Christy split from Tasos Hernandez in week 7. Lacy ended the season engaged to Marcus Grodd. They were later married, however, they soon split up.

Season 2

Clare, Cassandra Ferguson, and Chelsie Webster returned for the second season of Bachelor in Paradise. Clare was eliminated in week 3 and Chelsie in week 5. Cassandra ended the season in a relationship with Justin Reich. They split after Paradise.

Season 5

Cassandra returned for the fifth season of Bachelor in Paradise. She split with Jordan Mauger in week 6.

==== The Bachelor Winter Games ====
Clare returned for The Bachelor Winter Games under Team USA. She quit in week 3.

==== Couples Therapy ====
Juan Pablo Galavis and Nikki Ferrell participated in VH1 reality series Couples Therapy.

==== Got to Get Out ====
Clare appeared on the first season of the Hulu show Got to Get Out.

== Call-out order ==
| Order | Bachelorettes | Week | | | | | | | | | |
| Order | Bachelorettes | 1 | 2 | 3 | 4 | 5 | 6 | 7 | 8 | 9 | 10 |
|---|---|---|---|---|---|---|---|---|---|---|---|
| 1 | Amy L. | Sharleen | Clare | Cassandra | Nikki | Renee | Andi | Andi | Nikki | Nikki | Nikki |
| 2 | Cassandra | Clare | Kat | Nikki | Sharleen | Clare | Sharleen | Nikki | Clare | Clare | Clare |
| 3 | Christy | Nikki | Kelly | Chelsie | Andi | Nikki | Clare | Clare | Andi | Andi | |
| 4 | Christine | Renee | Cassandra | Andi | Renee | Sharleen | Nikki | Renee | Renee | | |
| 5 | Nikki | Andi | Nikki | Renee | Chelsie | Cassandra | Renee | Chelsie | | | |
| 6 | Kat | Alli | Andi | Kelly | Kelly | Chelsie | Chelsie | Sharleen | | | |
| 7 | Chantel | Chantel | Elise | Sharleen | Danielle | Kat | Kat | | | | |
| 8 | Victoria | Lauren S. | Sharleen | Elise | Cassandra | Andi | Cassandra | | | | |
| 9 | Lucy | Kelly | Renee | Kat | Alli | Alli; Danielle; Kelly | | | | | |
| 10 | Danielle | Cassandra | Danielle | Alli | Clare | Alli; Danielle; Kelly | | | | | |
| 11 | Lauren S. | Danielle | Lucy | Clare | Kat | Alli; Danielle; Kelly | | | | | |
| 12 | Chelsie | Chelsie | Alli | Lauren S. | Elise; Lauren S. | | | | | | |
| 13 | Valerie | Kat | Chelsie | Danielle | Elise; Lauren S. | | | | | | |
| 14 | Elise | Victoria | Lauren S. | Christy; Lucy | | | | | | | |
| 15 | Ashley | Christy | Christy | Christy; Lucy | | | | | | | |
| 16 | Clare | Lucy | Amy L. Chantel | | | | | | | | |
| 17 | Alli | Elise | Amy L. Chantel | | | | | | | | |
| 18 | Amy J. | Amy L. | Victoria | | | | | | | | |
| 19 | Renee | Alexis; Amy J. Ashley; Christine; Kylie; Lacy; Lauren H. Maggie; Valerie | | | | | | | | | |
| 20 | Lauren H. | Alexis; Amy J. Ashley; Christine; Kylie; Lacy; Lauren H. Maggie; Valerie | | | | | | | | | |
| 21 | Maggie | Alexis; Amy J. Ashley; Christine; Kylie; Lacy; Lauren H. Maggie; Valerie | | | | | | | | | |
| 22 | Kelly | Alexis; Amy J. Ashley; Christine; Kylie; Lacy; Lauren H. Maggie; Valerie | | | | | | | | | |
| 23 | Lacy | Alexis; Amy J. Ashley; Christine; Kylie; Lacy; Lauren H. Maggie; Valerie | | | | | | | | | |
| 24 | Alexis | Alexis; Amy J. Ashley; Christine; Kylie; Lacy; Lauren H. Maggie; Valerie | | | | | | | | | |
| 25 | Kylie | Alexis; Amy J. Ashley; Christine; Kylie; Lacy; Lauren H. Maggie; Valerie | | | | | | | | | |
| 26 | Sharleen | Alexis; Amy J. Ashley; Christine; Kylie; Lacy; Lauren H. Maggie; Valerie | | | | | | | | | |
| 27 | Andi | Alexis; Amy J. Ashley; Christine; Kylie; Lacy; Lauren H. Maggie; Valerie | | | | | | | | | |

The contestant received the first impression rose
The contestant received a rose during the date
The contestant was eliminated outside the rose ceremony
The contestant was eliminated
The contestant was eliminated during the date
The contestant quit the competition
The contestant won the competition

== Episodes ==
| No. overall | No. in season | Title | Original release date | Prod. code | U.S. viewers (millions) | Rating/share (18–49) |
|---|---|---|---|---|---|---|
| 166 | 1 | "Week 1: Season Premiere" | January 6, 2014 | 1801 | 8.65 | 2.7/7 |
There are no dates for the week. Before Juan Pablo begins to his quest for love, previous Bachelor star Sean Lowe visits him at Bachelor home and gives an insight and advice include on Sean's experience on his own journey during the previous season. Memorable moments from the ladies arriving the mansion are Christine, who brings a cute little name bracelet for Juan Pablo's daughter, Camila, Nikki brings a stethoscope and has Juan Pablo feel her heart beat, Kat gives a lesson from Juan Pablo for a salsa dance, Lucy walks out of a limo barefoot, Lauren S. takes a piano bike approaching to the mansion, followed by Chelsie, a science educator, shows to Juan Pablo on making a science experiment, then was quickly followed by Ashley, who gives out some gold stars, being a 1st grade teacher, Clare shows her fake pregnant belly to Juan Pablo, and Kelly brings her dog over at the mansion. Amy J. shows Juan Pablo with a massage table and gives a free soothe massage, Lauren H. was previously engaged to a man that was going to be married and told Juan Pablo about being upset with the previous relationship. Sharleen got a first impression rose. She said "sure" when he asked her. All the others girls got jealous and wondered "why her and not me". Also, many girls were getting nervous and emotional because they didn't get their one-on-one time with Juan Pablo. At the first rose ceremony, Juan Pablo called Kat's name and Kylie walked forward instead to get a rose, which was an embarrassing mistake. Alexis, Amy J., Ashley, Christine, Kylie, Lacy, Lauren H., Maggie, and Valerie were all sent home.
| 167 | 2 | "Week 2" | January 13, 2014 | 1802 | 7.96 | 2.3/6 |
First One-on-one Date: Clare. Juan Pablo arrived at the Bachelor mansion and picked Clare to a car with a blindfold on. They didn't know they were going to a park with man-made snow in Malibu. The two went sledding and had a snowball fight. They also enjoyed some time in a hot tub and heard a private concert by Josh Krajcik, and she got the rose. Back at the house, when most girls are in a hot tub, Lucy went topless and caught all of the girls' attention. Second One-on-one Date: Kat. Kelly and her dog pick up the date card and it simply read, "Do you feel the electricity?" She and Juan Pablo rode a private jet and flew to Salt Lake City, where they participated in the Electric Run at night with professional runners. On the stage with the runners, Juan Pablo and holds a rose to Kat. Group Date: Alli, Andi, Cassandra, Chantel, Chelsie, Christy, Elise, Kelly, Lauren S., Lucy, Nikki, Renee and Victoria. Juan Pablo and the selected ladies participated in a group date: a photo shoot with rescued puppies for a charity. Some ladies chose the perfect outfit, while Elise and Andi had emotionally expressed picking a choice of clothing and were selected to shoot nude. Elise is utterly depressed by her look and switched costumes with Lucy, walking herself naked on a sidewalk alley with a dog. Andi was still emotional getting ready for the shoot, and Juan Pablo finally made a deal to have Andi a chance to do the photo shoot in the nude, and she accepted. Afterwards, they went to a hotel, where Victoria became emotional because of her behavior, and became drunk and started sobbed in the bathroom. Lucy called Juan Pablo to interrupt a one-on-one session with Christy to discuss Victoria's emotional breakdown. The date finally ended with Kelly receiving the rose. The next morning, Juan Pablo arrived at the hotel to see Victoria in a suite where she stayed, and he decided to send her home. In addition on Victoria's sudden elimination, the other ladies who didn't get a date were Amy L., Danielle and Sharleen. Cocktail Party: Juan Pablo finally had one-on-one time with Amy L. Being a news reporter, she gave him interview questions. Cassandra, one of the two single moms, showed Juan Pablo a picture of her son and told him how much she missed him. Rose Ceremony: During the ceremony, Juan Pablo calls Allison instead of Alli, and was deemed to pick the right rose. Amy L. and Chantel did not receive roses and were eliminated.
| 168 | 3 | "Week 3" | January 20, 2014 | 1803 | 7.94 | 2.3/6 |
First One-on-One Date: Cassandra. Juan Pablo drives Cassandra to the beach, and surprises her by driving straight into the water. They drive in a water boat to a yacht. They swim and kiss, and she states that she no longer has fears about staying. They then go back to Juan Pablo's house, where he cooks dinner for her. Over dinner, he presents her with the rose. Group Date: Andi, Lauren S, Alli, Danielle, Sharleen, Renee, Kelly, Christy, Lucy, Nikki. The group arrives at StubHub Center soccer stadium. Juan Pablo plays soccer along with three soccer players from Los Angeles Galaxy (some of them are former Galaxy players), and runs through some soccer drills with the girls before having the girls split up into two teams to play against each other. After the game, the girls have time to talk to Juan Pablo individually. Andi and Juan Pablo kiss in the kitchen of the stadium, and Sharleen and Juan Pablo kiss in the middle of the soccer field, with the other girls jealously looking on. Nikki gets the rose. Second One-on-One Date: Chelsie. Juan Pablo's date card says "Do you trust me?" He first takes her to a Venezuelan eatery in Pasadena, where she tries traditional food. She says that if this is what he meant by "trust me," she can't wait for what else is in store. After they finished dinner, they arrived at the Colorado Street Bridge. Chelsie is afraid on heights, but is more confident after Juan Pablo talks to her about her fears, and they jump off the bridge together, kissing upside-down. Later, they enjoy a private dinner at Pasadena City Hall, danced to live music with Billy Currington on stage, and she receives a rose. Back at the house, Elise explains her frustration over not having received the date card (which she was expecting), and explaining that Chelsie is more of a "little girl" than a woman. She is not the only one who didn't have a date, Clare and Kat also didn't have their dates either. Cocktail Party: Juan Pablo surprises the girls by showing up to cook them breakfast. Kelly comes downstairs to sees what he is cooking, followed by the other girls. Some are unhappy that he is seeing them in their natural state, while others embrace the opportunity. After cooking them traditional Venezuelan arepas, Juan Pablo announces that they will have a relaxing pool party at the house, rather than a fancy cocktail party that evening. Some girls grab a lot of attention. Kat sits on Juan Pablo's shoulders in the pool, and Sharleen holds and kisses Juan Pablo in front of the other girls, again. Others, such as Clare, become particularly jealous, and must be comforted by Juan Pablo. Rose Ceremony: Andi receives the first rose. Christy and Lucy were eliminated.
| 169 | 4 | "Week 4: Seoul, South Korea" | January 27, 2014 | 1804 | 8.61 | 2.5/7 |
Before the week started, Juan Pablo packed his bags and continued his quest to find love somewhere halfway around the world in a foreign country. He says goodbye to Camila and his parents. At the mansion, Chris Harrison comes in and tells the remaining ladies they would be heading to Seoul, South Korea and Juan Pablo will meet them there. First Group Date: Chelsie, Cassandra, Elise, Danielle, Kat, Nikki. Before the date starts, Alli opens up an envelope that has "POP" written inside it. The girls and Juan Pablo visit YG Entertainment and meet with the K-Pop group 2NE1. They learn dance moves to a song of theirs, and perform at their concert later that night as backup dancers. After the concert, the group goes to the Korea Furniture Museum, where Kat becomes the first to have alone time with Juan Pablo. While the rest of the girls are left behind in a group, Nikki talks about the girls behind their backs, much to the rest of the group's disdain. Nikki receives the rose. One-on-One Date: Sharleen. Juan Pablo takes Sharleen exploring through Seoul, tasting food together. Later in the evening, they go to dinner, where Juan Pablo forces Sharleen to sing to him. Sharleen receives a rose. Juan Pablo says that she may be his soul mate in his solo interview. Second Group Date: Renee, Lauren S., Clare, Andi, Kelly, Alli. First, the group goes and sings karaoke, and they tall try some Korean street food. Clare is disgusted after eating fried octopus, and the ladies help her eat the food. After, they go to a massage studio and have the dead skin eaten off of their feet by small fish. Then, they go and walk around Seoul. That night, Renee is the first one to get alone time with Juan Pablo. Lauren S. became emotional when she was going to kiss Juan Pablo while dancing, left herself with a cameraman and Juan Pablo quickly followed her. Andi receives the rose. Cocktail Party: Nikki interrupts Clare's alone time with Juan Pablo. Juan Pablo tells Nikki that he thinks there might be a problem within the house. Clare tells Nikki that those problems stem from her and Nikki gets upset. Rose Ceremony: Renee is called first and Kat last. Elise and Lauren S. were eliminated. Elise was very emotional upon leaving, as it was her deceased mother's wish for her to be on the show. Juan Pablo and the remaining ladies travel to Vietnam.
| 170 | 5 | "Week 5: Vietnam" | February 3, 2014 | 1805 | 8.33 | 2.6/7 |
First One-on-One Date: Renee. She meets Juan Pablo in the ancient city of Hoi An and rent bicycles. They explore the town and visit a clothing store, where she finds a traditional Vietnamese dress that she would wear the night. During dinner, Juan Pablo asked Renee about her own life. she tells him about the father of her child, although the relationship with her former lover was tough for her and her friends. At the end, Renee receives a rose. Group Date: Kat, Clare, Cassandra, Danielle, Alli, Andi, Sharleen, Chelsie, and Kelly. They meet with Juan Pablo at a river with a date card saying, "Can you go with the flow?" They ride a traditional Vietnamese boat down the river. They are paired into four teams which were Kat & Andi, Cassandra & Danielle, Alli & Chelsie and Sharleen & Kelly. Some were mad that Clare didn't have a teammate, and was partnered with Juan Pablo instead, having struggled on a paddle boat reaching a grassy point. Then, they traveled to Tra Que Village and participate in traditional Vietnamese customs like giving Vietnamese hats, eating Vietnamese food for lunch, and farm work. Later that night, Juan Pablo and the girls on the date have a night of partying. Juan Pablo asks Clare to take a night dip in a pool, and she receives the rose. Shortly after the date ended, Clare found Juan Pablo and asked if he wanted to swim in the ocean with her at night. He agreed and the two took a dip into the ocean. Second One-on-One Date: Nikki. She and Juan Pablo traveled to Marble Mountains and descended down 200 feet (61 m) to a "hell cave" below. Juan Pablo has a conversation with Nikki about her being a trained nurse and that her decision was part of her dream. In the end, she receives a rose for the third straight time. Cocktail Party: The girls arrive at the rose ceremony on a boat. He announces that three people will be leaving at the end of the evening. This puts a lot of pressure on the eight remaining without a rose, as three already have roses. Juan Pablo talks to Clare about their alone time in the ocean and tells her that he does not want to set a bad example for his daughter. Clare cries, trying to be discrete, although the other women notice and are confused. Rose Ceremony: Sharleen is called first. Danielle, Kelly, and Alli were sent home.
| 171 | 6 | "Week 6: New Zealand" | February 10, 2014 (Note: Week 6: New Zealand and Week 7: Miami, Florida were aired during the 2014 Winter Olympics.) | 1806 | 7.87 | 2.3/6 |
The episode of the date took place in New Zealand. First One-on-One Date: Andi. Juan Pablo takes Andi on her first one-on-one date to "the squeeze", which is a path through caves filled with water that are so small, it "squeezes" you. The path ends at a hot waterfall. While they're eating dinner, a geyser goes off and soaks them, and they're forced to move. She receives the rose. Group Date: Sharleen, Chelsie, Renee, Nikki, Kat, Cassandra. It is revealed that it is Cassandra's 22nd birthday. They start out on a picnic in a field surrounded by cows. Then, the group takes a ride in giant inflatable balls down a hill of water. Later, Juan Pablo takes the girls to Hobbiton, the set of The Lord of the Rings and The Hobbit. Renee is the first to get alone time with him. After giving Sharleen the rose, he takes Cassandra aside to talk to her privately. He sends her home to be with her son on her birthday. Sharleen receives the rose. Second One-on-One Date: Clare. They go down and have a picnic on the beach. There, Clare hopes to get answers about the conversation they had regarding what they did in the ocean. Clare tells him that she likes casual dates instead of fancy ones, so Juan Pablo fetches some sweats and they relax together for the remainder of the evening. She receives the rose. Cocktail Party: Nikki is the first to have alone time with Juan Pablo. All of the women are very nervous about who is going home as only one person is. Rose Ceremony: Nikki is called first. Kat is sent home. Afterwards, Juan Pablo announces to the remaining ladies the next destination: Miami, Florida.
| 172 | 7 | "Week 7: Miami, Florida" | February 17, 2014 | 1807 | 7.68 | 2.2/6 |
No roses are to be given out on the one-on-one dates. For the group date, he will choose one person to whom he will give a rose. Juan Pablo returns to Miami and reunites with his family, including Camila and his cousin Rodolfo. They discuss what he learned in the previous dates. First One-on-One Date: Sharleen. She met with Juan Pablo on the seaside. The pair then rides a small yacht to an island. They have a conversation together about her planning to leave the competition. Second One-on-One Date: Nikki. Juan Pablo brought Nikki to a flower shop. He buys her a bouquet of flowers, and they go to a dance studio to meet with Camila, Juan Pablo's parents, and actress Carla Rodriguez (who is Juan Pablo's ex-girlfriend and Camila's mother), to watch Camila's dance recital. They traveled to Marlins Park for a night picnic. Following Nikki's date with Juan Pablo, Sharleen decides to leave the show as she does not feel as strongly as she should about Juan Pablo. Group Date: Chelsie, Andi, Clare, and Renee. The girls and Juan Pablo rented a seaplane to an island and spend their time together on a private beach. Chelsie brings a set of notes that she keeps for the rest of the journey, Renee is very excited to meet with her son if she gets an approval for an upcoming hometown date, and Clare is sympathized on her brood family. In the end, Andi receives the rose and the two go on a date alone, leaving the rest of the ladies back at the hotel. Juan Pablo continues the date with Andi and take her to South Beach to hang out, and they see Romeo Santos salsa dance. A couple of hours after the group date, Chelsie, Renee, and Clare go back to the hotel and meet with Nikki. Nikki leaves in the middle of the conversation. Clare confronts Nikki and the two argue, their obvious but silent tension coming forward. Cocktail Party: The girls are very nervous regarding the roses. Renee is the first to receive alone time. Rose Ceremony: Nikki is called first, and Renee is called last. Chelsie is sent home. She was devastated and cried in the limo.
| 173 | 8 | "Week 8: Hometowns" | February 24, 2014 | 1808 | 8.17 | 2.5/7 |
Nikki: Nikki's hometown date begins in Kansas City, Missouri. She and Juan Pablo stopped at Oklahoma Joe's BBQ for lunch, where Juan Pablo gets a taste of Kansas City-style barbecue. Then, they ride on a mechanical bull. That evening, Nikki takes Juan Pablo to meet her parents, younger brothers, and her sister-in-law at the family house. Juan Pablo talks with Nikki's father, who wants a better relationship for Nikki, but still gives a slight bit of approval to Juan Pablo. Andi: Once in Atlanta, Georgia, Andi takes Juan Pablo to a shooting range. Both Juan Pablo and Andi taking practice shoots on accurate targets with pistols. Despite it being his first time shooting, Juan Pablo manages to shoot with good aim and a bit of accuracy. She is so happy and anxious to arrive at her house, where there is a "Welcome Home, Pookie" sign in the entrance door. Andi introduces Juan Pablo to her parents, her older sister, and her brother-in-law. Andi's dad is more skeptical on meeting Juan Pablo in person and they have to slight talk. Andi's dad is better at giving Juan Pablo approval to join the family. Renee: Next is Renee's hometown of Sarasota, Florida. She meets with Juan Pablo to watch her son's baseball game. She is excited for Juan Pablo to meet her son, which makes him happy. He learns that Renee is really a good mother to her son, and they visit her home to meet with Renee's parents and brother. She takes her son to bed, and Renee has a talk to her mother privately upstairs about the friendship. Clare: Finally, in Sacramento, Clare meets with Juan Pablo by a lake in McKinley Park. She tells the story of her deceased father's final days. Juan Pablo is saddened to hear about her father's ill health. She takes Juan Pablo to her home and meets with her large family, being the youngest of six siblings. Clare's older siblings are all protective of her and wanted to have a long talk with Juan Pablo. Then, Clare began to talk with Juan Pablo and asks to give a break for going a breakdown with the family. Finally, Clare's mom talks to Juan Pablo in Spanish. Juan Pablo tells her about his country Venezuela. All of Clare's respective family want Clare to get the proposal. Rose Ceremony: The rose ceremony took place in Miami instead of Los Angeles, as in previous seasons. Juan Pablo handed out the roses to Nikki, Clare and Andi. Renee was sent home. She cried in the limo because she could now be with her son. Afterwards, Juan Pablo and the remaining women hopefuls have to continue on their journey to Saint Lucia.
| 174 | 9 | "Week 9: Fantasy Suites" | February 25, 2014 | 1809 | 8.13 | 2.5/7 |
Clare: Clare and Juan Pablo take a boat ride in a yacht, where they spend the day. The two are offered a night together in the Fantasy Suite. Clare is hesitant at first, because of what happened in Vietnam, but eventually agrees. Andi: Andi is second to have an overnight date. They go to a village and play soccer with local kids. Later, they spend the night together in the Fantasy Suite. They wake up, Juan Pablo feeling very good about the night. Andi, however, felt that the night was a disaster. He mentions his overnight with Clare, which upsets her greatly. She decides that he is not the one for her. Nikki: Juan Pablo decides to take Nikki horseback riding on the beach, where they end up having a picnic. They have an overnight date, where Nikki tells Juan Pablo that she is in love with him. Rose Ceremony: Juan Pablo watches the personal videos that each of the women made. Clare tells him that he loves her in her video. Andi tells Juan Pablo in her message that she wants to talk to him about the Fantasy Suite in person. The two have a discussion about it that ends in an argument. Andi leaves the show. The remaining two girls are told that Andi has left. Juan Pablo tells them that there are two roses left and that they are free to say no if they don't want to move forward. Nikki is called first, with both of the girls accepting the rose.
| 175 | 10 | "The Women Tell All" | March 3, 2014 | N/A | 8.15 | 2.3/6 |
Before the introduction of this season's contestants, newlyweds Sean and Catherine Lowe (née Giudici) discuss their married life and honeymoon in Bora Bora, which included diving with sharks. Seventeen of the twenty-seven contestants sat down for the reunion show, including Kelly's dog Molly and two eliminees from night one: Kylie and Lauren H. First, Sharleen talks about how she left her heart with Juan Pablo back in Miami, and she is deeply in sorrowed with a broken heart. Renee tells of her life since her elimination and announces that she is happily engaged to a man and plans to move to Seattle. Andi discusses her shocking exit following a breakdown with a Fantasy Suite card, stating that her behavior was awful. Then, scene bloopers include a water buggy stuck on a river and trying to get help during Juan Pablo and Cassandra's date, Molly the dog pees in a pool and Juan Pablo wearing pink boxer shorts for an initial plan on a rose ceremony.
| 176 | 11 | "Week 10: Season Finale" | March 10, 2014 | 1810 | 10.10 | 3.3/10 |
The final two have a chance to meet with Juan Pablo's family in St. Lucia, and have to spend time with Juan Pablo. Nikki has already met Juan Pablo's parents and Camila back in Miami, only she meets with Juan Pablo's siblings and cousin. Over at the final dates, Juan Pablo and Clare ride a helicopter to a cliff and realizing on the relationship. Nikki and Juan Pablo took on a boat and across them to a beach. At the final rose ceremony, Juan Pablo eliminated Clare and he chooses Nikki at the end. However, Juan Pablo did not propose, stating that as Nikki's father suggested, he should be 100% sure before he proposes. He tells her that he "likes her... A LOT." and he gives her the final rose.
| 177 | 12 | "After the Final Rose" | March 10, 2014 | N/A | 10.97 | 3.8/11 |
There is a live finale viewing party and then the "After the Final Rose" follows. Chris Harrison begins the show by hyping up a surprise that Juan Pablo has in store for all of the viewers, including himself. Chris Harrison puts Clare Crawley in the hot seat first. He asks her questions about how she felt, the controversial helicopter ride, and how the Sacramento-raised hair-stylist was doing now. Clare insists that she's extremely happy. She says it hurts to watch the finale, and that she does not want the chance to talk to Juan Pablo again. She claims that she doesn't want to hear any more "bull****" from him. After Clare, Juan Pablo comes to the stage. First, he mentions the troubles in Venezuela. Then, Harrison asks him about what he thought about Clare. Juan Pablo attempts to defend himself against the way that he has been portrayed and about the reality of the experience. Trying to push things along, Chris Harrison interrupts to ask his next question. He is immediately interrupted by the bachelor saying, "Can I talk? ...Wooh!" This does not go over well with the crowd. Harrison continues prompting him with questions, to which Juan Pablo says that he prefers his privacy and he's always honest. He also says he has no regrets about the show. Next, Nikki is in the hot seat. She reveals that she and Juan Pablo are still together. She tells Harrison how much she loves her new Venezuelan boyfriend. Harrison asks Nikki if Juan Pablo loves her and Nikki responds, "Um, I don't know?" in an upbeat voice. Harrison expresses his concern over this fact, but Nikki defends the bachelor by saying that she knows he cares for her by the way that he acts. Finally, Juan Pablo and Nikki are reunited in the first public appearance together. Juan Pablo comes out and gives Nikki a "besito." He again explains his reasoning about not proposing and tells Harrison that they are happy together and glad to be able to go out in public together. Chris Harrison asks Juan Pablo about the surprise he has for tonight, but Juan Pablo is confused by this statement. He says that he has no surprise. Chris Harrison continues to push for an answer about how Juan Pablo feels about Nikki. He says things like, "I feel fantastic about her" instead of saying that he loves her, which upsets Chris and the audience. Juan Pablo insists that now is the time for them to be private as a couple and really start their relationship. He says that the two are "so done with the show." Nikki says that a lot of contestants come on the show and say that they're in love, but it's obviously not real. She believes in their relationship. At the end of the show, Chris Harrison announces that the new bachelorette will be Andi Dorfman. She tells him how badly she wants to fall in love and share her life with someone. She is hopeful that the show will make that possible for her.
