= The Bachelorette (American TV series) season 10 =

Season of American television series

The Bachelorette
- Season 10
- Promotional poster
- Starring: Andi Dorfman
- Presented by: Chris Harrison
- No. of contestants: 25
- Winner: Josh Murray
- Runner-up: Nick Viall
- No. of episodes: 13 (including 3 specials)

Release
- Original network: ABC
- Original release: May 19 – July 28, 2014

Additional information
- Filming dates: March 12 – April 23, 2014; April 29 – May 10, 2014

Season chronology
- ← Previous; Season 9 Next → Season 11

The tenth season of The Bachelorette premiered on May 19, 2014, and featured Andi Dorfman, a 27-year-old assistant district attorney from Atlanta, Georgia. Dorfman finished in third place on season 18 of The Bachelor, featuring Juan Pablo Galavis, after she eliminated herself because of Galavis' behavior on their overnight date.

The season concluded on July 28, 2014, with Dorfman accepting a proposal from 29-year-old Josh Murray. They announced their break-up on January 8, 2015.

== Production ==
=== Casting and contestants ===
Andi Dorfman was named as the Bachelorette during the After the Final Rose special of the season 18 on The Bachelor on March 10, 2014.

Just before the cast announcement, Eric Hill, a 31-year-old intrepid quest traveler from California, was critically injured on Easter Sunday, April 20, 2014 when he slammed into a mountain near Draper, Utah. His parachute collapsed during a paragliding accident after he concluded his filming; Hill died of injuries three days later on April 23, 2014. The show honored Hill by dedicating the upcoming season to him.

On the season premiere, host Chris Harrison dedicated the season to Hill:

Throughout the years many hundreds of men and women have come on this show in search of love, and they've all become a part of what we consider part of this family. At this time, we'd like to take a moment to honor one of these men — our friend, Eric Hill. Eric passed away shortly after concluding his filming of this show. In the coming weeks, you'll see Eric was a vibrant man. Every day he impressed us with his passion and courageous spirit. He will be greatly missed, and we dedicate this season to him.

Notable cast members include Josh Murray, who is the brother of football quarterback and future NFL player Aaron Murray.

=== Filming and development ===
The season began filming on Wednesday, March 12, 2014. in California. Other locales include Connecticut, France, Italy and Belgium with notable performances from This Wild Life, Boyz II Men and American Young. Filming of this season had been paused for a few days, many producers and eliminated contestants went to Hill's hometown for his grief.

== Contestants ==
The season began with 25 contestants.

In week 1, season 8 contestant Chris Bukowski asked to join the cast, but Dorfman eliminated him at the rose ceremony.

Name	Age	Hometown	Occupation	Outcome	Place	Ref
Josh Murray	29	Tampa, Florida	Former Professional Baseball Player	Winner	1	
Nick Viall	33	Waukesha, Wisconsin	Software Sales Executive	Runner-up	2	
Chris Soules	32	Arlington, Iowa	Farmer	Week 9	3	
Marcus Grodd	25	Medicine Hat, Alberta	Sports Medicine Manager	Week 8	4	
Brian Osborne	27	Camp Hill, Pennsylvania	Basketball Coach	Week 7	5–6	
Dylan Petitt	26	Longmeadow, Massachusetts	Accountant	Week 7	5–6	
J.J. O'Brien	30	Hanover, Massachusetts	Pantsapreneur	Week 6	7	
Cody Sattler	28	Oakley, Kansas	Personal Trainer	Week 6	8	
Andrew Poole	30	Portola Valley, California	Social Media Marketer	Week 5	9–11	
Marquel Martin	26	Rialto, California	Sponsorship Salesman	Week 5	9–11	
Patrick Jagodzinski	29	Clinton, New Jersey	Advertising Executive	Week 5	9–11	
Tasos Hernandez	30	Denver, Colorado	Wedding Event Coordinator	Week 4	12	
Eric Hill	31 (Note: Eric died on April 23, 2014, after having already completed his filming.)	Citrus Heights, California	Explorer	Week 4	13	
Bradley Wisk	32	Grosse Pointe, Michigan	Opera Singer	Week 3	14–15	
Brett Melnick	29	Warminster, Pennsylvania	Hairstylist	Week 3	14–15	
Ron Worrell	28	Nahariya, Israel (Note: Ron is originally from Nahariya, Israel, but was residing in Nashville, Tennessee at the time of casting and filming.)	Beverage Sales Manager	Week 3	16 (quit)	
Carl King	30	Hollywood, California	Firefighter	Week 2	17–19	
Craig Muhlbauer	29	Defiance, Iowa	Tax Accountant	Week 2	17–19	
Nick Sutter	27	Barrington, Illinois	Professional Golfer	Week 2	17–19	
Emil Schaffroth	33	Portland, Oregon	Helicopter Pilot	Week 1	20–25	
Jason Leep	35	Sturgeon Bay, Wisconsin	Urgent Care Physician	Week 1	20–25	
Josh Bauer	29	Evergreen, Colorado	Telecommunication Marketer	Week 1	20–25	
Mike Campanelli	29	Guilderland, New York	Bartender	Week 1	20–25	
Rudie Dane	31	Yorba Linda, California	Attorney	Week 1	20–25	
Steven Woolworth	30	Meadow Vista, California	Snowboard Product Developer	Week 1	20–25	

=== Future appearances ===
==== The Bachelor ====
Chris Soules was chosen as lead of the nineteenth season of The Bachelor. Cody Sattler made a surprise cameo during Soules' introduction video.

Nick Viall was chosen as the lead of the twenty-first season of The Bachelor. Dorfman made an appearance in episode 8.

==== The Bachelorette ====
Viall returned for the eleventh season of The Bachelorette. He entered the competition in week 4, with Kaitlyn Bristowe's permission in New York City. He finished as runner-up against Shawn Booth.

==== Bachelor in Paradise ====
Season 1

Dylan Petitt, Marquel Martin, Tasos Hernandez, Marcus Grodd and Cody Sattler returned for the inaugural season of Bachelor in Paradise. Petitt was eliminated in week 2, and Martin in week 4. Hernandez split from Christy Hansen in week 7. Sattler left Paradise in a relationship with Michelle Money. Grodd ended the season engaged to Lacy Faddoul.

Season 3

Viall, Brett Melnick, Carl King, and Josh Murray returned for season 3 of Bachelor in Paradise. King was eliminated in week 4. Melnick quit the show in week 5. Viall split from Jennifer Saviano in week 6. Murray ended the season engaged to Amanda Stanton.

==== Dancing with the Stars ====
Soules competed in the twentieth season of Dancing with the Stars. He partnered with Witney Carson and finished in 5th place.

Viall competed in the twenty-fourth season of Dancing With the Stars. He partnered with Peta Murgatroyd and finished in 7th place.

== Call-out order ==
Order	Bachelors	Week									
Order	Bachelors	1	2	3	4 (Note: The episode aired an "in memoriam" segment in honor of Eric rather than the Rose Ceremony. The Rose Ceremony was aired the following week during The Journey So Far special.)	5	6	7	8	9	10
1	Marcus	Nick V.	Eric	Nick V.	Dylan	Josh M.	Nick V.	Nick V.	Josh M.	Nick V.	Josh M.
2	Chris	J.J.	Marcus	Josh M.	Brian	J.J.	Chris	Josh M.	Chris	Josh M.	Nick V.
3	J.J.	Eric	Chris	J.J.	Marcus	Brian	Dylan	Marcus	Nick V.	Chris	
4	Marquel	Marquel	Ron	Marcus	Nick V.	Marcus	Brian	Chris	Marcus		
5	Tasos	Craig	Dylan	Brian	J.J.	Nick V.	Marcus	Brian; Dylan			
6	Cody	Tasos	J.J.	Marquel	Josh M.	Chris	Josh M.	Brian; Dylan			
7	Steven	Josh M.	Marquel	Tasos	Cody	Dylan	J.J.				
8	Rudie	Brian	Andrew	Cody	Chris	Cody	Cody				
9	Carl	Bradley	Tasos	Patrick	Andrew	Andrew; Marquel; Patrick					
10	Jason	Marcus	Josh M.	Chris	Patrick	Andrew; Marquel; Patrick					
11	Nick V.	Andrew	Cody	Eric	Marquel	Andrew; Marquel; Patrick					
12	Dylan	Ron	Nick V.	Dylan	Tasos						
13	Patrick	Carl	Patrick	Andrew	Eric						
14	Emil	Chris	Brian	Bradley; Brett							
15	Brett	Dylan	Brett	Bradley; Brett							
16	Craig	Brett	Bradley	Ron							
17	Ron	Patrick	Carl; Craig; Nick S.								
18	Bradley	Cody	Carl; Craig; Nick S.								
19	Josh B.	Nick S.	Carl; Craig; Nick S.								
20	Nick S.	Emil; Jason; Josh B. Mike; Rudie; Steven									
21	Brian	Emil; Jason; Josh B. Mike; Rudie; Steven									
22	Andrew	Emil; Jason; Josh B. Mike; Rudie; Steven									
23	Mike	Emil; Jason; Josh B. Mike; Rudie; Steven									
24	Eric	Emil; Jason; Josh B. Mike; Rudie; Steven									
25	Josh M.	Emil; Jason; Josh B. Mike; Rudie; Steven									

The contestant received the first impression rose
The contestant received a rose during a date
The contestant was eliminated outside the rose ceremony
The contestant was eliminated
The contestant was eliminated during a date
The contestant quit the competition
The contestant won the competition

== Episodes ==
No. overall	No. in season	Title	Original release date	Prod. code	U.S. viewers (millions)	Rating/share (18–49)
97	1	"Week 1: Season Premiere"	May 19, 2014	1001	7.17	2.0/6
98	2	"Week 2"	May 26, 2014	1002	6.03	1.6/5
99	3	"Week 3: Santa Barbara"	June 1, 2014	1003	5.02	1.4/4
100	4	"Week 4: Connecticut"	June 2, 2014	1004	6.74	1.8/6
101	5	"The Journey So Far"	June 9, 2014	N/A	4.48	1.0/4
102	6	"Week 5: Marseille, France"	June 16, 2014	1005	6.50	1.7/5
103	7	"Week 6: Venice, Italy"	June 23, 2014	1006	6.05	1.5/5
104	8	"Week 7: Belgium"	June 30, 2014	1007	6.48	1.6/6
105	9	"Week 8: Hometowns"	July 7, 2014	1008	6.99	1.8/6
106	10	"Week 9: Fantasy Suites"	July 14, 2014	1009	6.91	1.7/5
107	11	"The Men Tell All"	July 21, 2014	N/A	7.09	1.8/6
108	12	"Week 10: Season Finale"	July 28, 2014	1010	8.00	2.0/7
109	13	"After the Final Rose"	July 28, 2014	N/A	8.15	2.1/6
