= The Bachelorette (American TV series) season 8 =

Season of US television series

The Bachelorette
- Season 8
- Promotional poster
- Starring: Emily Maynard
- Presented by: Chris Harrison
- No. of contestants: 25
- Winner: Jef Holm
- Runner-up: Arie Luyendyk Jr.
- No. of episodes: 12 (including 2 specials)

Release
- Original network: ABC
- Original release: May 14 – July 22, 2012

Additional information
- Filming dates: March 14 – May 10, 2012

Season chronology
- ← Previous; Season 7 Next → Season 9

The eighth season of The Bachelorette, an ABC reality television series, premiered on May 14, 2012. This season features 26-year-old Emily Maynard, a single mother from West Virginia living in Charlotte, North Carolina.

Maynard was previously the winner of season 15 of The Bachelor, where she got engaged to Brad Womack; however, they ended their engagement in May 2011.

The season concluded on July 22, 2012, with Maynard accepting a proposal from 27-year-old entrepreneur Jef Holm. They ended their engagement in October 2012.

This is the first season of The Bachelorette filmed in Maynard's current city of Charlotte, North Carolina, where she and her daughter Ricki Hendrick live (along with the child's paternal grandfather; the child's father died before she was born). This marks the first time a show in The Bachelor franchise has taken place in the Southern United States and also the second time one has been filmed on the East Coast since New York City in season three.

== Production ==
=== Casting and contestants ===
On January 18, 2012, Maynard was announced as the next Bachelorette.

Notable contestants including race car driver Arie Luyendyk Jr.; former college football player Sean Lowe; and singer-songwriter David Homyk.

Michael Nance died on May 29, 2017. The official cause of his death was multiple drug toxicity, according to the Travis County Office of the Medical Examiner. His death was ruled as accidental.

== Contestants ==
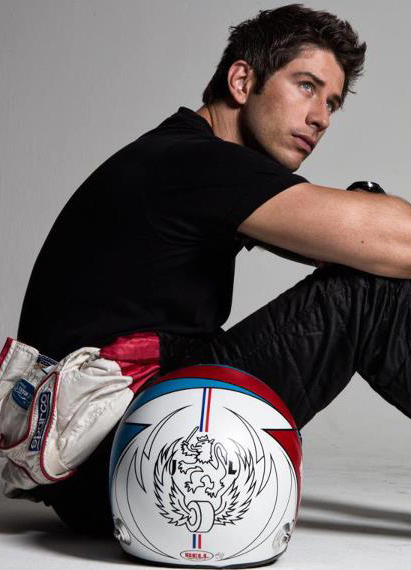
Arie Luyendyk Jr.

David Homyk

On May 1, 2012, 25 contestants were revealed. Biographical information according to ABC's official series site, which gives first names only, plus footnoted additions. Ages stated are at time of contest.

Name	Age	Hometown	Occupation	Outcome	Place
Jeffrey "Jef" Holm	27	St. George, Utah	Entrepreneur	Winner	1
Arie Luyendyk Jr.	30	Scottsdale, Arizona	Race Car Driver	Runner-up	2
Sean Lowe	28	Irving, Texas	Insurance Agent	Week 9	3
Chris Bukowski	25	Bartlett, Illinois	Corporate Sales Director	Week 8	4
John Wolfner	30	Creve Coeur, Missouri	Data Destruction Specialist	Week 7	5
Doug Clerget	33	Tacoma, Washington	Real Estate Agent	Week 7	6
Ryan Bowers	31	Evans, Georgia	Pro Sports Trainer	Week 6	7
Travis Pope	30	Madison, Mississippi	Advertising Sales Representative	Week 6	8
Alejandro Velez	25	Medellín, Colombia	Mushroom Farmer	Week 5	9
Kalon McMahon	27	Houston, Texas	Luxury Brand Consultant	Week 5	10
Charlie Grogan	32	Worcester, Massachusetts	Recruiter	Week 4	11–12
Michael Nance	26	Austin, Texas	Rehab Counselor	Week 4	11–12
Nathan Bakke	25	Casa Grande, Arizona	Accountant	Week 4	13
Stevie Alberino	26	Monroe Township, New Jersey	Party M.C.	Week 3	14
Alessandro Goulart	30	Saint Paul, Minnesota	Grain Merchant	Week 3	15
Tony Pieper	31	Beaverton, Oregon	Lumber Trader	Week 3	16
Aaron Martell	36	North Sydney, Nova Scotia	Biology Teacher	Week 2	17–18
Kyle Dillon	29	Long Beach, California	Financial Adviser	Week 2	17–18
Joe Gendreau	27	Orlando, Florida	Field Energy Adviser	Week 2	19
Brent Strandy	41	Midland, Texas	Technology Salesman	Week 1	20–25
David Homyk	33	Charlottesville, Virginia	Singer/Songwriter	Week 1	20–25
Jackson Bloore	29	Lockport, Illinois	Fitness Model	Week 1	20–25
Jean-Paul LaCount	35	Moraga, California	Marine Biologist	Week 1	20–25
Lerone Anu	29	Laguna Beach, California	Real Estate Consultant	Week 1	20–25
Randy Lee	30	Oak Creek, Wisconsin	Marketing Manager	Week 1	20–25

=== Future appearances ===
==== The Bachelor ====
Sean Lowe was chosen as the lead of season 17 of The Bachelor.

Arie Luyendyk Jr. was chosen as the lead of season 22 of The Bachelor.

==== Bachelor Pad ====
Chris Bukowski, Kalon McMahon, and Tony Pieper returned for the third season of Bachelor Pad. McMahon and his partner, Lindzi Cox, were eliminated in week 6, finishing in 5th place. Pieper and his partner, Blakeley Jones, were eliminated at the beginning of week 7, finishing in 4th place. Bukowski and his partner, Sarah Newlon, finished as the runners-up.

==== The Bachelorette ====
Bukowski returned for season 10 of The Bachelorette during night one. However, Bachelorette Andi Dorfman decided she didn't want to meet him, and he was sent home.

==== Bachelor in Paradise ====
Season 1

Bukowski and McMahon returned for the inaugural season of Bachelor in Paradise. Bukowski quit the show in week 3 due to a leg injury. McMahon was eliminated in week 4.

Season 2

Bukowski returned for season 2 of Bachelor in Paradise, but quit the show in week 4.

Season 6

Bukowski returned once again for season 6 of Bachelor in Paradise, and left engaged to Katie Morton.

==== Dancing With The Stars ====
Outside of the Bachelor Nation franchise, Lowe competed in the sixteenth season of Dancing with the Stars. He was partnered with Peta Murgatroyd and finished in 6th place.

==== Other appearances ====
Luyendyk, Jean-Paul LaCount and Alejandro Velez appeared as a contestants in the Bachelors vs. Bachelorettes special on season 7 of Wipeout.

Luyendyk also appeared as a contestant on season 1 of The Traitors.

== Call-out order ==
Order	Bachelors	Week									
Order	Bachelors	1	2	3	4	5	6	7	8	9	10
1	Sean	Doug	Ryan	Chris	Doug	Sean	Chris	Sean	Arie	Jef	Jef
2	David	Chris	Jef	Sean	Jef	Jef	Sean	Jef	Jef	Arie	Arie
3	Doug	Ryan	Kalon	Arie	John	Doug	Jef	Arie	Sean	Sean	
4	Jackson	Kalon	Arie	Jef	Sean	Ryan	Arie	Chris	Chris		
5	Joe	Arie	Michael	Charlie	Arie	Chris	Doug; John	John			
6	Arie	Charlie	Nathan	Doug	Travis	John	Doug; John	Doug			
7	Kyle	Jef	Sean	Michael	Chris	Travis	Ryan				
8	Chris	Nathan	Chris	Travis	Ryan	Arie	Travis				
9	Aaron	Sean	Doug	Alejandro	Kalon	Alejandro					
10	Alessandro	Joe	Travis	Ryan	Alejandro	Kalon					
11	Jef	Kyle	Tony	John	Charlie; Michael						
12	Lerone	Aaron	John	Kalon	Charlie; Michael						
13	Stevie	Alejandro	Alessandro	Nathan	Nathan						
14	Charlie	John	Charlie	Stevie							
15	Tony	Alessandro	Alejandro	Alessandro							
16	Randy	Michael	Stevie	Tony							
17	Nathan	Stevie	Aaron; Kyle								
18	Brent	Tony	Aaron; Kyle								
19	John	Travis	Joe								
20	Travis	Brent; David; Jackson; Jean-Paul; Lerone; Randy									
21	Michael	Brent; David; Jackson; Jean-Paul; Lerone; Randy									
22	Jean-Paul	Brent; David; Jackson; Jean-Paul; Lerone; Randy									
23	Alejandro	Brent; David; Jackson; Jean-Paul; Lerone; Randy									
24	Ryan	Brent; David; Jackson; Jean-Paul; Lerone; Randy									
25	Kalon	Brent; David; Jackson; Jean-Paul; Lerone; Randy									

The contestant received the first impression rose
The contestant received a rose during a date
The contestant was eliminated
The contestant was eliminated during a date
The contestant was eliminated outside the rose ceremony
The contestant was part of non-elimination bottom two
The contestant won the competition

== Episodes ==
No. overall	No. in season	Title	Original release date	Prod. code	U.S. viewers (millions)	Rating/share (18–49)
73	1	"Week 1: Season Premiere"	May 14, 2012	801	8.05	2.6/7
74	2	"Week 2"	May 21, 2012	802	7.53	2.4/6
75	3	"Week 3"	May 28, 2012	803	5.79	1.9/5
76	4	"Week 4: Bermuda"	June 4, 2012	804	6.77	2.2/6
77	5	"Week 5: London"	June 11, 2012	805	7.43	2.3/7
78	6	"Week 6: Croatia"	June 18, 2012	806	7.04	2.3/7
79	7	"Week 7: Prague"	June 25, 2012	807	7.03	2.3/7
80	8	"Week 8: Hometowns"	July 2, 2012	808	7.49	2.5/8
81	9	"Week 9: Fantasy Suites"	July 9, 2012	809	8.11	2.5/7
82	10	"The Men Tell All"	July 16, 2012	N/A	7.16	2.2/6
83	11	"Week 10: Season Finale"	July 22, 2012	810	8.86	3.1/9
84	12	"After the Final Rose"	July 22, 2012	N/A	8.80	3.1/8
