= Bachelor in Paradise (American TV series) season 1 =

Season of television series

Bachelor in Paradise
- Season 1
- No. of episodes: 7

Release
- Original network: ABC
- Original release: August 4 – September 8, 2014

Season chronology
- Next → Season 2

The first season of Bachelor in Paradise premiered on August 4, 2014, a week after season ten of The Bachelorette, with the season finale airing on September 8, 2014. Chris Harrison reprised his role from The Bachelor and The Bachelorette as the host of the show.

== Production ==
In March 2013, ABC canceled Bachelor Pad after three seasons. ABC then announced a new spin-off series, Bachelor In Paradise. The season was filmed in Tulum, Mexico.

== Contestants ==
The first batch of contestants were revealed on June 4, 2014, but only 14 contestants were confirmed. On July 14, 2014, an additional 11 contestants were revealed, resulting in 25 contestants.

Name	Age	Residence	From	Arrived	Outcome
Marcus Grodd	25	Dallas, Texas	The Bachelorette – Andi	Week 1	Engaged
Lacy Faddoul	26	La Jolla, California	The Bachelor – Juan Pablo	Week 1	Engaged
Cody Sattler	28	Chicago, Illinois	The Bachelorette – Andi	Week 4	Relationship
Michelle Money	33	Salt Lake City, Utah	The Bachelor – Brad; Bachelor Pad – Season 2	Week 1	Relationship
Robert Graham	31	Los Angeles, California	The Bachelorette – Desiree	Week 1	Split Week 7
Sarah Herron	27	Marina del Rey, California	The Bachelor – Sean	Week 1	Split Week 7
Zack Kalter	29	Los Angeles, California	The Bachelorette – Desiree	Week 2	Split Week 7
Jackie Parr	26	Boca Raton, Florida	The Bachelor – Sean	Week 3	Split Week 7
Tasos Hernandez	30	Denver, Colorado	The Bachelorette – Andi	Week 6	Split Week 7
Christy Hansen	25	Chicago, Illinois	The Bachelor – Juan Pablo	Week 5	Split Week 7
Graham Bunn	35	New York City, New York	The Bachelorette – DeAnna; Bachelor Pad – Season 2	Week 1	Split Week 7
AshLee Frazier	33	Houston, Texas	The Bachelor – Sean	Week 1	Split Week 7
Brooks Forester	29	Salt Lake City, Utah	The Bachelorette – Desiree	Week 6	Week 6
Jesse Kovacs	32	San Diego, California	The Bachelorette – Jillian; Bachelor Pad – Season 1	Week 4	Week 6 (Quit)
Lucy Aragon	25	Santa Barbara, California	The Bachelor – Juan Pablo	Week 5	Week 5
Clare Crawley	33	Sacramento, California	The Bachelor – Juan Pablo	Week 1	Week 5 (Quit)
Kalon McMahon	29	Houston, Texas	The Bachelorette – Emily; Bachelor Pad – Season 3	Week 4	Week 4
Marquel Martin	27	Las Vegas, Nevada	The Bachelorette – Andi	Week 1	Week 4
Danielle Ronco	26	St. Louis, Missouri	The Bachelor – Juan Pablo	Week 3	Week 3
Elise Mosca	28	Los Angeles, California	The Bachelor – Juan Pablo	Week 1	Week 3 (Quit)
Chris Bukowski	27	Washington, D.C.	The Bachelorette – Emily; Bachelor Pad – Season 3	Week 2	Week 3 (Quit)
Dylan Petitt	26	Boston, Massachusetts	The Bachelorette – Andi	Week 1	Week 2
Ben Scott	30	Dallas, Texas	The Bachelorette – Desiree	Week 1	Week 2 (Quit)
Daniella McBride	26	San Francisco, California	The Bachelor – Sean	Week 1	Week 1
Michelle Kujawa	30	Anaheim, California	The Bachelor – Jake; Bachelor Pad – Season 1	Week 1	Week 1 (Quit)

== Elimination Table ==
Place	Contestant	Week							
Place	Contestant	1	2	3	4	5	6	7	
1-4	Marcus	Date	Date	In	Date	In	Date	In	Engaged
1-4	Lacy	Date	Date	In	Date	In	Date	In	Engaged
1-4	Cody	Wait			In	Date	In	In	Relationship
1-4	Michelle M.	Date	In	Last	In	Date	In	In	Relationship
5-6	Robert	Date	Last	In	Date	Date	In	In	Split
5-6	Sarah	Last	Date	In	Date	Date	In	In	Split
7-12	Zack	Wait	Date	In	In	In	Last	Split	
7-12	Jackie	Wait		Date	Date	In	Date	Split	
7-12	Tasos	Wait					Date	Split	
7-12	Christy	Wait				Last	Date	Split	
7-12	Graham	In	In	Date	In	Date	In	Split	
7-12	AshLee	In	In	Date	In	Date	In	Split	
13	Brooks	Wait					Out		
14	Jesse	Wait			Last	Date	Quit		
15	Lucy	Wait				Out			
16	Clare	Date	Date	In	In	Quit			
17-18	Kalon	Wait			Out				
17-18	Marquel	Date	In	Date	Out				
19	Danielle	Wait		Out					
20-21	Elise	In	In	Quit					
20-21	Chris	Wait	Date	Quit					
22	Dylan	In	Out						
23	Ben	In	Quit						
24	Daniella	Out							
25	Michelle K.	Quit							

=== Key ===
The contestant is male.
The contestant is female.

Date The contestant had a date and gave out a rose at the rose ceremony.
Date The contestant went on a date and got a rose at the rose ceremony.
In The contestant gave or received a rose at the rose ceremony, thus remaining in the competition.
Last The contestant received the last rose.
Last The contestant went on a date and received the last rose.
Out The contestant went on a date and rejected a rose and ended up getting eliminated.
Out The contestant went on a date and was eliminated.
Out The contestant was eliminated.
Quit The contestant had a date and voluntarily left the show
Quit The contestant voluntarily left the show.
Quit The contestant quit the show after being in a relationship back home.
Quit The contestant quit due to injury.
Split The couple broke up and was eliminated.
Stay The couple decided to stay together and won the competition.
Wait The contestant had to wait to appear in paradise.

== Episodes ==
No. overall	No. in season	Title	Original release date	Prod. code	U.S. viewers (millions)	Rating/share (18–49)
1	1	"Week 1: Series Premiere"	August 4, 2014	101	5.31	1.4/5
Arrival Order: Clare, Marcus, Sarah, Marquel, Daniella, Graham, Lacy, Ben, Michelle K., Robert, Dylan, Elise and AshLee. Chris Harrison asked everyone if they were single and Michelle K. said "maybe". Throughout the first day, Lacy went into the ocean with Robert and Marcus in an 8-hour span. She went into the ocean while Marcus went in there by himself feeling rejected over bachelorette Andi Dorfman. Clare's date: Clare initially wanted to take Graham on the date, but AshLee "claimed" Graham at the start, which made Clare go on a date with Robert. Clare and Robert went to the ruins; while climbing the ruins, Robert got attacked by fire ants. Sarah's date: Sarah took Marcus on a date and went cliff diving. During the date, Michelle Money joined the cast in Mexico. Michelle M.'s date: Michelle M. arrived with a date card and took Marquel, they went horseback riding on a beach in Playa del Carmen. Lacy's date: Lacy took Robert on a date and they had dinner on a beach. Rose ceremony: The rose ceremony came after a cocktail party. Before the first rose was handed out Michelle K. stepped out and left because she never had any feelings for a guy. In order Marquel gave his rose to Michelle M., Graham gave his rose to AshLee, Dylan gave his rose to Elise, Marcus gave his rose to Lacy which upset Robert who then gave his rose to Clare, Ben had the final rose which he gave to Sarah over Daniella eliminating her.
2	2	"Week 2"	August 11, 2014	102	5.31	1.5/5
Chris's Date: Chris showed up with a date card and he took Clare to Papaya Playa on a trip to a spa. During the date Dylan tells Elise to talk to other men in paradise. Marcus's Date: Marcus took Lacy on a date and they had dinner in Zcaret. During the date Elise did what Dylan requested which was hooking up with Chris in the ocean, they had a conversation about this the next day and Dylan told Elise if she offered him a rose, he would reject it. Zack's Date: Zack showed up with a date card and took Clare to the city to explore, then went swimming in the ocean. Dylan's Date: Dylan took Sarah on a date and had dinner. Before the Rose Ceremony, Marcus and Marquel confronted Ben upon finding a love letter in his backpack from a girl back home. Ben admitted to being in love with her, upsetting everyone especially Michelle, and decided to go home. Rose Ceremony Lacy gives her rose to Marcus, Ashlee gives hers to Graham, Clare to Zack, Michelle to Marquel, Elise gives hers to Dylan but he declines, so she gives it to Chris instead, Sarah gives her rose to Robert over Dylan, eliminating him.
3	3	"Week 3"	August 18, 2014	103	5.06	1.3/4
Elise's Date: Elise asked Chris out. Before the date began, Chris sprained his knee. He decided to go through with the date, despite being in great pain. Immediately after the date he went to the hospital for treatment. Danielle: Danielle showed up at the bachelor house with a date. She asked Marquel to go on the date and they went swimming. At the house, Michelle and Clare decided to take Zack and Robert on a mini double date. Sarah was pretty upset about this. Jackie: Jackie showed up with a date card. She decided to take Marquel as well for his second date this week. Danielle and Michelle were a little upset about this. They went the Campeche Mexico and explored. They shared a kiss after Marquel and Jackie both said they don't usually kiss on the first date. Sarah and the others expressed their concern to Elise about being careful with Chris and not getting too serious too fast. AshLee: Ashlee asked Graham to go on her date with her. They went to dinner. AshLee started talking about living together and Graham asked her to not put pressure on forever anymore. They got a card from Chris Harrison with two room keys. Graham wanted to use both rooms, but Ashlee wanted to share a room. They ended up using both rooms. Rose Ceremony: Graham gave his rose to Ashlee. Zack gave his rose to Clare. Marcus gave his rose to Lacy. Marquel gave his rose to Jackie. Robert gave his rose to Sarah. Chris asked Elise to come forward. He told Elise that he could not give her the rose, because he had decided to leave the show due to his knee injury. Instead, he asked Elise to leave along with him so they could continue to pursue their relationship back home, and she accepted. Chris decided to give his rose to Michelle so she could continue her journey of true love. Danielle was eliminated.
4	4	"Week 4"	August 25, 2014	104	4.84	1.3/4
Robert: Robert gets the first date and decides to take Sarah. They go sailing and swimming in the ocean. Cody's Date Card: Cody arrived with a date card. He asks Clare, but she decided to pass on the date because of Zack. Cody then decided to pass it to his friend Marcus, so he could have more time to get to know the people in the house. Many of the women thought that was a very nice gesture. Marcus takes Lacy. Kalon's Date: Kalon arrived with a date card. He asked Michelle and she accepted, but then she cancelled on him. He asked a few other girls, but none of the women went with him (recalling how badly he had upset Emily Maynard and her daughter in The Bachelorette (season 8). Feeling certain that he would be eliminated later at the Rose Ceremony, he decided to go by himself and enjoy it rather than pass the card, creating the show's first "one on none" date. Jesse: Jesse shows up with a date card and he invites Jackie to go out with him. She accepts and Marquel is kind of upset. They go to an ancient Mayan Cave. The date is a little awkward at first, but gets better toward the end. Andrew Ripp performs. Before the Rose Ceremony, AshLee said disrespectful things about Clare to Zack and her remarks were caught on camera. Word got back to Clare and she confronted AshLee about it. Michelle informed Graham about the situation right before the Rose Ceremony began. Graham started to have second thoughts about AshLee. Rose Ceremony: Lacy gives her rose to Marcus. Clare gives her rose to Zack. AshLee asked Graham to come forward. At that point Graham turned and left the room. Michelle followed after him. AshLee continued to stand in the Rose Ceremony room and did not follow Graham. After seeing a medic, Graham returned and accepted the rose from AshLee. Then Lacy became ill and departed in an ambulance, accompanied by Marcus. The rose ceremony continued. Michelle gave her rose to Cody. Sarah gave her rose to Robert. Jackie gave her rose to Jesse. Kalon and Marquel were eliminated at the Rose Ceremony.
5	5	"Week 5"	August 26, 2014	105	5.07	1.4/5
Christy: Christy shows up with a date card and asks Zack to go with her, but he turns her down. Christy then asks Jesse to join her on the date. They go shopping in Mexico. Lacy and Marcus return from the hospital. Sarah: Sarah got a date card and asked Robert to join her. They go out to dinner and go swimming. They share a kiss. Clare was still upset about the disrespectful comments from AshLee. She came to Zack to let him know that she had decided to quit. Lucy's Date: Lucy arrived with a date card. She asked Jesse out and they went to some ruins. Michelle's Date: Michelle asked Cody out and they had their 'engagement' photos taken on the beach, even though it was their first date. AshLee's Date: She asked Graham out and they drove sports cars on a road course. Christy began to feel insecure about her status with Jesse. She spoke to him and was reassured. They started to make out in private and were joined by Lucy. Rose Ceremony: Sarah accepts Robert's rose. AshLee accepts Graham's rose. Cody gives his rose to Michelle. Lacy accepted Marcus' rose with a very long kiss. Zack gives his rose to Jackie. Jesse chose Christy over Lucy, so Lucy was eliminated.
6	6	"Week 6"	September 1, 2014	106	5.01	1.3/4
Marcus's Date: Marcus took Lacy on a date exploring in a cave. Lacy told Marcus she was falling in love with him. Brooks' Date: Sarah was hoping that Brooks would ask her out, and Brooks wanted to do it, but Robert informed Brooks that he and Sarah were a couple and Brooks should pick someone else. Brooks asked Jackie out. Tasos's Date: Tasos arrived with a date card. Tasos pulled Michelle aside first and told him he should take Christy. Tasos told her how great of a guy Cody was. Tasos asked Christy on the date and Jesse wasn't happy because he doesn't want to leave Paradise. On the date, Tasos and Christy go swimming in a lazy river. Zack's Date: Zack asked Jackie on the date, and Brooks wasn't too thrilled. AshLee was also upset it wasn't Graham who got the date card. Zack and Jackie went swimming in a cave. They kissed. Before the Rose Ceremony, Jesse had a talk with Christy and realized that he would not be getting a rose from her. He decided to quit at that point rather than be eliminated later. Before he could depart, Christy came to the car and told him all of the reasons that she was angry with him. Jesse didn't seem concerned by this, saying later that he had fun and he knew there would be many emails and party invitations waiting for him when returned home. Rose Ceremony: Lacy gave her rose to Marcus. AshLee gave her rose to Graham. Sarah gave her rose to Robert. Michelle gave her rose to Cody. Christy to Tasos. Jackie gave her rose to Zack. Brooks was eliminated. Then Chris Harrison announced that there would be no more newcomers; the final episode would be a test of their new relationships.
7	7	"Week 7"	September 8, 2014	107	5.40	1.4/4
Chris Harrison asked each of the couples to have a serious talk with each other and decide whether to continue or go home. AshLee and Graham decided to split up after some prompting by Michelle. Zack, Jackie, Tasos and Christy all decided to break up. That left three couples: Sarah and Robert, Michelle and Cody, and Lacy and Marcus. The three couples went on romantic overnight dates in fantasy suites. Lacy and Marcus and Michelle and Cody came back convinced that they should remain as couples. However, Sarah complained that there was little intimacy on their date. She confronted Robert about this and he just apologized and left with no explanation. The two remaining couples were joined by three couples (Jason/Molly Mesnick, Sean/Catherine Lowe and Desiree Hartsock/Chris Seigfried) who had found love on the show in the past. They agreed that the two remaining couples had a good chance of making it work. Rose Ceremony: Michelle and Cody exchanged roses and left as a couple. Marcus proposed to Lacy and she accepted. In the epilogue, it was revealed that Chris and Elise broke up after less than two weeks. Michelle and Cody were still in a relationship at the time. Clare was still in Sacramento searching for her soulmate.

== Post Show ==
In December 2014, Michelle and Cody announced that they decided to end their relationship, and got back together in June 2015, but later broke up again. In 2016 they appeared on Marriage Boot Camp, where they broke up again.

Marcus and Lacy were wed by Chris Harrison on the season premiere of season 2 of Bachelor in Paradise. However, in July 2016 Marcus admitted that the two were never legally married and have since broken up.

Clare returned to Paradise for season 2. She was eliminated in week 3.
