= The Bachelorette (American TV series) season 9 =

Season of US television series

The Bachelorette
- Season 9
- Promotional poster
- Starring: Desiree Hartsock
- Presented by: Chris Harrison
- No. of contestants: 25
- Winner: Chris Siegfried
- Runner-up: Drew Kenney
- No. of episodes: 12

Release
- Original network: ABC
- Original release: May 27 – August 5, 2013

Additional information
- Filming dates: March 13 – May 8, 2013

Season chronology
- ← Previous; Season 8 Next → Season 10

The ninth season of The Bachelorette premiered on May 27, 2013. This season features 27-year-old Desiree Hartsock, a bridal stylist from Northglenn, Colorado. Hartsock finished in fourth place on season 17 of The Bachelor featuring Sean Lowe.

The final episode aired on August 5, 2013, with Hartsock accepting a proposal from 27-year-old mortgage broker Chris Siegfried. They married January 18, 2015, and currently live in Portland, Oregon with their three sons, Asher, Zander, and Noah.

== Production ==
=== Casting and contestants ===
Casting began during the airing of the eighth season of the show, in 2012. Before the bachelorette was chosen, one potential candidate, Misee Harris, a pediatric dentist from Tennessee, was vying to become the first black bachelorette. Her social media campaign was covered in a number of major news outlets, including The Huffington Post. According to the website Jezebel, Harris had previously been selected to be a contestant on The Bachelor, only to not take the role for fear of being the 'token' black woman. At that point every star in all 25 combined seasons of The Bachelorette or The Bachelor had been Caucasian, with show producer Mike Fleiss stating to the media that non-caucasians simply didn't appear at the casting calls.

On March 11, 2013, during the After the Final Rose on season 17 of The Bachelor, Desiree Hartsock was selected as the bachelorette, then 26, a bridal stylist from Northglenn, Colorado. Like the bachelorettes in the previous seasons, Hartsock had been a contestant on The Bachelor, having been sent home by Sean Lowe after the hometown dates episode in that season. Misee Harris went on to work as a model and entrepreneur, founding a line of mouthguards and starting Project Smile, an organization that "focuses on promoting self-esteem in children."

Notable contestants include soccer player Juan Pablo Galavis, who would become the first non-Caucasian star for the combined franchises the following year, appearing in season 18 of The Bachelor.

=== Filming and development ===
Filming began on March 13, 2013, shortly after the season finale of The Bachelor, with many places including Atlantic City, New Jersey, the German state of Bavaria, Barcelona, Spain and the island of Madeira in Portugal. With appearances from Andy Grammer, Soulja Boy, Darius Rucker, Kate Earl and Matt White.

== Contestants ==
Biographical information according to ABC official series site, which gives first names only, plus footnoted additions. Ages stated are at time of contest.

Name	Age	Hometown	Occupation	Outcome	Place	Ref
Chris Siegfried	27	McMinnville, Oregon	Mortgage Broker	Winner	1	
Drew Kenney	27	Scottsdale, Arizona	Digital Marketing Analyst	Runner-Up	2	
Brooks Forester	28	Blackfoot, Idaho	Sales Rep	Week 9	3 (quit)	
Zak Waddell	31	Arlington, Texas	Drilling Fluid Engineer	Week 8	4	
Michael Garofola	33	Lindenhurst, New York	Federal Prosecutor	Week 7	5	
James Case	27	Marietta, Georgia	Advertising Executive	Week 6	6–8	
Juan Pablo Galavis	31	Barquisimeto, Venezuela (Note: Juan Pablo is originally from Barquisimeto in Venezuela, but was residing in Miami, Florida at the time of casting and filming.)	Former Pro Soccer Player	Week 6	6–8	
Kasey Stewart	29	Tulsa, Oklahoma	Advertising Executive	Week 6	6–8	
Mikey Tenerelli	30	Glen Ellyn, Illinois	Plumbing Contractor	Week 5	9	
Ben Scott	28	Lubbock, Texas	Entrepreneur	Week 5	10	
Bryden Vukasin	26	Havre, Montana	Iraq War Veteran	Week 5	11 (quit)	
Zack Kalter	28	Phillips Ranch, California	Book Publisher	Week 4	12	
Brad McKinzie	27	Denver, Colorado	Accountant/DJ	Week 4	13	
Brandon Andreen	26	Blaine, Minnesota	Painting Contractor	Week 3	14–15	
Dan Cox	30	Dublin, California	Beverage Sales Director	Week 3	14–15	
Brian Jarosinski	29	Olney, Maryland	Financial Advisor	Week 3	16 (DQ)	
Nick Mucci	27	Rochester, New York	Investment Adviser	Week 2	17–19	
Robert Graham	30	Glendale, Arizona	Advertising Entrepreneur	Week 2	17–19	
Will Reese	28	Federal Way, Washington	Banker	Week 2	17–19	
Diogo Custodio	29	Penha, Brazil (Note: Diogo is originally from Penha in Brazil, but was residing in Lake Tahoe, California at the time of casting and filming.)	Ski Resort Manager	Week 1	20–24	
Larry Burchett	34	Overland Park, Kansas	ER Doctor	Week 1	20–24	
Micah Heisler	32	Detroit Lakes, Minnesota	Law Student	Week 1	20–24	
Mike Ross	28	Dallas, Texas	Dental Student	Week 1	20–24	
Nick Roy	26	Ridgefield, Connecticut	Tailor/Magician	Week 1	20–24	
Jonathan Vollinger	26	Hickory, North Carolina	Lawyer	Week 1	25	

=== Future appearances ===
==== The Bachelor ====
Juan Pablo Galavis was chosen as the lead of the eighteenth season of The Bachelor. He became the first Latino bachelor in the franchise's history.

==== Bachelor in Paradise ====
Season 1

Ben Scott, Brooks Forester, Zack Kalter, and Robert Graham, returned for the inaugural season of Bachelor in Paradise. Scott quit the show in week 2. Forester was eliminated in week 6. In week 7, Kalter split from Jackie Parr, and Graham split from Sarah Herron.

Season 2

Dan Cox, Michael Garofola and Mikey Tenerelli returned for the second season of Bachelor in Paradise. Garofola and Tenerelli were eliminated in week 2. Tenerelli returned in week 4. He and Cox quit the show in week 5.

Season 3

Brandon Andreen returned for the third season of Bachelor in Paradise. He was eliminated in week 2.

==== The Bachelor Winter Games ====
Garofola returned for The Bachelor Winter Games as a part of Team USA. He quit the show in week 3.

==== Other appearances ====
Outside of Bachelor Nation franchise, Kalter appeared as a contestant in the Bachelors vs. Bachelorettes special on the season 7 of Wipeout alongside Kasey Stewart and Larry Burchett.

== Call-out order ==
Order	Bachelors	Week									
Order	Bachelors	1	2	3 (Note: In week 3, Brian was disqualified from the competition after his girlfriend came to the mansion to confront him.)	4	5	6	7	8	9	10
1	Drew	Ben	Brooks	Chris	Zak W.	Chris	Drew	Drew	Brooks	Drew	Chris
2	Brooks	Zak W.	Ben	Kasey	James	Brooks	Zak W.	Brooks	Chris	Chris	Drew
3	Brad	Bryden	Bryden	James	Chris	Michael G.	Chris	Chris	Drew	Brooks	
4	Bryden	Drew	James	Bryden	Brooks	Zak W.	Brooks	Zak W.	Zak W.		
5	Michael G.	Nick M.	Kasey	Juan Pablo	Juan Pablo	Kasey	Michael G.	Michael G.			
6	Kasey	Michael G.	Dan	Zak W.	Drew	Juan Pablo	James; Juan Pablo; Kasey				
7	Will	Brandon	Juan Pablo	Brooks	Michael G.	Drew	James; Juan Pablo; Kasey				
8	Mikey T.	Zack K.	Brad	Drew	Ben	James	James; Juan Pablo; Kasey				
9	Jonathan	Will	Chris	Zack K.	Kasey	Mikey T.					
10	Zak W.	Brooks	Brian	Brad	Bryden	Ben					
11	James	Juan Pablo	Zak W.	Michael G.	Mikey T.	Bryden					
12	Larry	Brad	Drew	Mikey T.	Zack K.						
13	Nick R.	Kasey	Mikey T.	Ben	Brad						
14	Zack K.	James	Zack K.	Brandon; Dan							
15	Diogo	Robert	Michael G.	Brandon; Dan							
16	Chris	Brian	Brandon	Brian							
17	Mike R.	Dan	Nick M. Robert; Will								
18	Robert	Chris	Nick M. Robert; Will								
19	Juan Pablo	Mikey T.	Nick M. Robert; Will								
20	Brandon	Diogo; Larry; Micah; Mike R. Nick R.									
21	Brian	Diogo; Larry; Micah; Mike R. Nick R.									
22	Micah	Diogo; Larry; Micah; Mike R. Nick R.									
23	Nick M.	Diogo; Larry; Micah; Mike R. Nick R.									
24	Dan	Diogo; Larry; Micah; Mike R. Nick R.									
25	Ben	Jonathan									

The contestant received the first impression rose
The contestant received a rose outside of a rose ceremony or date
The contestant received a rose during a date
The contestant was eliminated
The contestant was eliminated outside the rose ceremony
The contestant was eliminated during a date
The contestant quit the competition
The contestant was disqualified from the competition
The contestant won the competition

== Episodes ==
No. overall	No. in season	Title	Original release date	Prod. code	U.S. viewers (millions)	Rating/share (18–49)
85	1	"Week 1: Season Premiere"	May 27, 2013	901	5.99	1.9/5
No dates this week. Memorable moments from the contestants arriving in the mansion include: Jonathan offers Desiree a fantasy suite card during introduction; Zak W. arrives shirtless; Larry tries to dance with Desiree but ends up ripping her dress; Nick R. performs a magic trick; Diogo arrives in a suit of armor; and Ben arrives with his son. Jonathan repeatedly attempts to invite Desiree to his "fantasy suite" room throughout the night, causing Desiree to send him home before the rose ceremony. Ben, Zak W., Bryden, Drew, Nick M. and Michael G receive a first impression rose. Larry, Diogo, Nick R., Micah and Mike R. are eliminated in the rose ceremony.
86	2	"Week 2"	June 3, 2013	902	5.69	1.7/5
One-on-one Date: Brooks. Des takes Brooks to a bridal salon where they try on numerous tux's and wedding dresses and proceed to buy 2. Des thought that was Brooks the "perfect guy to bring on this date" because he knew it wasn't serious, it was just for fun. They then go to get their 'wedding' cupcakes and travel up to see the Hollywood Sign where Desiree reveals it is the Sign's 90th Anniversary. Following this, they have a dinner set up on a bridge where Brooks discusses losing his father at a young age. Upon hearing music they discover Andy Grammer and his band playing "Keep Your Head Up". Brooks received a rose. Group Date: Dan, Juan Pablo, Kasey, Zach K., Will, Brian, Drew, James, Mikey, Zak W., Nick, Michael, Brandon and Ben. Desiree lets the guys know that they'll be performing in their very own rap video with Soulja Boy at the mansion. Ben received a rose. One-on-one Date: Bryden. Desiree takes Bryden on a road trip through California where they visit El Matador Beach and the Ojayi Valley Inn & Spa. Bryden shares his experience in a serious car accident. Bryden received a rose. Cocktail Party: The men let Ben know that he is rubbing some of the other guys the wrong way but he claims to not realize what he did. Rose Ceremony: Nick M., Robert and Will do not receive a rose and are sent home.
87	3	"Week 3"	June 10, 2013	903	5.76	1.8/5
Group Date: Chris, Brian, Drew, Michael, Brooks, Brad, Mikey, Brandon, Zach K. and Ben. Desiree tells the guys that they'll be playing a dodge ball game against each other where the team that loses will return to the mansion while the team that wins will continue on with the date. The red team consists of Mikey, Michael, Brooks, Chris and Brandon while the blue team is Ben, Drew, Zach K., Brad and Brian. Brooks breaks his finger during the match and is taken to hospital. The blue team wins 2-1. However, being impressed by their performance Des lets the guys know that they will all be continuing on with the date. Brad reveals he has a 3 year-old son. Chris received a rose. At the mansion: Chris Harrison calls Desiree and lets her know that one of the guys has been dishonest and has a girlfriend on the outside. Chris, Des and Stephanie (the girlfriend) approach Brian and he leaves the competition. One-on-one Date: Kasey. Desiree takes Kasey dancing on the side of a building strapped to a harness. However, due to a windstorm the date was cut short and Des felt that it was all a little "off" but Kasey receives a rose nevertheless. Group Date: James, Bryden, Juan Pablo, Zak. W, Dan. Desiree takes the men to a cowboy boot-camp with the stand-out performer spending more time with Des. Juan Pablo wins the extra time with Des but James receives a rose. Pool Party: All the boys vie for alone time with Des and Ben lies about spending extra time with Des. Rose Ceremony: Brandon and Dan do not receive roses and are sent home.
88	4	"Week 4: Atlantic City"	June 17, 2013	904	5.47	1.7/5
At the start of the episode, Chris Harrison tells the guys that are leaving the mansion to Atlantic City, New Jersey. One-on-one Date: Brad. Desiree and Brad enjoy various attractions around the Atlantic City Boardwalk with dinner at the Absecon Light. Des does not feel a spark therefore not giving Brad a rose which sends him home. Group Date: Zak W., Chris, Brooks, Juan Pablo, Drew, Michael, Ben, Kasey, Bryden and Mikey. The men compete in the "Bachelorette Mr. America" pageant where Brooks is second runner-up, Zak W. is runner-up with Kasey taking the crown. Zak W. received a rose. One-on-one Date: James. Desiree and James took a helicopter ride to see the damage caused by Hurricane Sandy to the Jersey Shore. They visit a couple whose home has been destroyed and upon hearing the couple suffered this during their anniversary, Des and James decide to forfeit their date to the couple who enjoy a dinner at the House of Blues, followed by a private concert by Darius Rucker. James received a rose. Cocktail Party: Bryden is uncertain for his feelings for Des and considers turning down a rose if offered to him. Rose Ceremony: Zack K. does not receive a rose and is sent home. Afterwards, Desiree and the guys announced their next journey will be Bavaria in Germany.
89	5	"Week 5: Bavaria"	June 24, 2013	905	6.56	2.0/6
One-on-one Date: Chris. Desiree and Chris take in the sights of downtown Munich. Bryden interrupts the date to let Des know that his feelings are not progressing and he has decided to leave. Chris and Desiree have dinner in a royal hall with a private concert by Matt White. Chris receives a rose. Group Date: Juan Pablo, James, Kasey, Zak. W, Brooks, Drew and Mikey. The men and Desiree journey to the highest peak in Germany. They hear a yodeler and sled down the hill. They then go to the ice hotel. Brooks receives a rose. Two-on-one Date: Ben and Michael. Des and the men go into a motorized hot tub that floats in the lake. They then head to dinner in a ratskeller where Michael throws a lot of pointed questions at Ben which results in an upset Ben. Michael receives a rose. Ben is eliminated. At the mansion: Two of the guys overhear James say that he is looking forward to being in the final four so he can become famous and become the next Bachelor. The men consider telling Des this during the cocktail party, but Des cancels the party. Rose Ceremony: Mikey T was eliminated during the Rose Ceremony. Then at the end, Desiree announced the guys are going to leave to Barcelona, Spain.
90	6	"Week 6: Barcelona"	July 1, 2013	906	6.34	1.8/6
One-on-one Date: Drew. Desiree and Drew see the sights of downtown Barcelona. Drew receives a rose. Immediately after, Drew tells Desiree about James' comments. Des says that she appreciates getting the information. Group Date: Brooks, Chris, Kasey, Michael, James and Juan Pablo. The group date takes place at RCDE Stadium. Juan Pablo looks forward to the group date as he was a former pro player. After some practice, it was time for a game. Desiree revealed that her teammates would all be professional women soccer players. The women allowed the guys to score two goals, then got serious and scored ten goals in a row to win 10-2. After the match, the guys told James that Desiree knew about what he had said, and wanted to hear his side of it. James claimed that he was just speculating about the reality of what might happen if he did not win. The other guys felt that he should be focusing only on Desiree as they were. Desiree came into the room and said that she would not be giving out a group date rose, and she wanted to talk to James privately. They talked for a while but did not come to a resolution. Desiree said that she wanted to think it over and that they would resume the talk the next day. One-on-one Date: Zak W. Zak and Desiree started out at an art studio where they sketch male models and each other. This is followed by ended up at dinner at the Freixenet wine cellars. Zak received a rose. Morning After: The men are told at the beginning of the trip that there will be no cocktail party. James and Desiree continued their discussion but there was no decision. Rose Ceremony: Juan Pablo, Kasey and James were eliminated. In the end, Desiree and the remaining guys announced they are heading to Madeira in Portugal.
91	7	"Week 7: Madeira"	July 8, 2013	907	6.88	1.9/6
Prologue: Desiree met with her fellow cast mates from season 17 of The Bachelor: Jackie Parr, Lesley Murphy and Catherine Giudici at the hotel and have discussions together - all while spying on the current contestants. Brooks, Chris and Michael G. each had a one-on-one date; and Drew and Zak W. went on a two-on-one date. Brooks was initially reluctant about the thought of Desiree meeting his family, but he agreed. Before the Rose Ceremony, Desiree told Chris Harrison that she was "at the finish line" with Brooks, and he asked whether the show was over. She said that she would keep an open mind about the others. Michael was eliminated at the Rose Ceremony.
92	8	"Week 8: Hometowns"	July 15, 2013	908	6.63	1.8/6
Zak W.: The hometown date was started first with Zak W in Dallas, Texas to his family's snow cone business with an ice cream truck, and Zak W wears a giant penguin costume to entertain with the kids. Then, Zak W brings Desiree to meet with his parents, brother and sister (would go on to become a contestant of The Bachelor), and squeals on his half-naked exit. When Zak's mother asked Desiree on getting laughed a lot, while Zak's sister is convinced on making more jealous with Desiree. At the end, Zak W and his family are becoming Von Trapp Family singers for performing a rewritten version in the song in which he sang back in the date in Atlantic City. Drew: The next is Drew in Scottsdale, Arizona to a rare patch of green shade environment for a family dynamics. Drew brings her to his mom's house to meet with his family, including his mentally handicapped sister Melissa and his step-dad Bob. When his sister's caregiver is leading into the yard, Melissa is much happy on the sight of her brother for making more delight. After the family dinner, Desiree talks to Drew's dad for a heart-to-heart, and Drew is not much simply await to propose to her, his mom gives him a hug. Chris: Next is Chris' childhood home in McMinnville, Oregon, and he took Desiree to a Little League field where he used to play baseball as a child. Chris' dad is a chiropractor and gave Desiree an adjustment shortly after she arrived at his house. Even the dad going to make a treatment, even rather to make decline on the request, and she gets her chance to regret on giving a conversation from Chris' dad. Then, Chris' dad gives Desiree a tour in the house including malicious skeletons in a basement of the house, and balloons in Chris' room. Brooks: The last hometown date is Brooks in Salt Lake City to watch a "Fakata" TV show, when they are met in Liberty Park, including paddling on a canoe at a lake, and narrowly capsized the craft down. Then, Brooks brings Desiree at his house and meet with a crowd of his large family, with some of his family members wearing "Hello My Name" T-shirts, and eating a bunch of dinner with family and Brooks' friends. When Brooks' brothers asked Desiree to give plenty of questions, including on the happiness with the couple, if Brooks selects her. Back in Los Angeles, Desiree met privately with her brother who earlier had ruined her chances with Sean Lowe by calling him a 'playboy' to his face. She is still wrestling with the decision about whether to allow him to meet with this group of guys. Before the Rose Ceremony, Desiree said that she was still leaning heavily toward Brooks, although she was concerned that he was the only one of the four who has not said that he loves her. Zak W was eliminated during the Rose Ceremony.
93	9	"The Men Tell All"	July 22, 2013	N/A	6.52	1.9/6
Sixteen of the twenty-five contestants were present in attendance, including night one eliminee Jonathan and with the exception of Brian, who was back with his girlfriend. Jonathan apologized for his behavior in Week 1. Ben was given an opportunity to explain more about himself. There was much more discussion about what James said in Germany. Juan Pablo was featured, since he got little screen time but was a fan favorite. Zak W had some closure with Desiree. Chris Harrison promised that the 2-part finale would be the most dramatic ever.
94	10	"Week 9: Fantasy Suites"	July 29, 2013	909	7.94	2.4/7
The dates took place in Antigua and Barbuda. Drew and Desiree drove around the island and saw the sights. They planned to have dinner on the beach but it was rained out. Chris and Desiree went by helicopter to the island of Barbuda. Before leaving for Antigua, Brooks went to Las Vegas to see his mother and sister. He told them that he knew he ought to be in love with Desiree at this point, but he was not really feeling it and didn't know why. On Antigua, he met with Chris Harrison and told him the same. Later, he met Desiree for their date, which was planned to be a trip on a catamaran. Before leaving, he took her aside and told her how he felt, which made her cry. Later Desiree told Brooks that she loved him and was planning to tell him so on the trip. That made Brooks feel even worse. Brooks got in the limo to go home. Desiree wondered if she should continue, since she didn't have such strong feelings for the other two. As the episode ended, Desiree was sitting at the end of a pier, crying.
95	11	"Week 10: Season Finale"	August 5, 2013	910	8.94	2.6/8
At the start of the episode, Desiree was unsure about how she would proceed with the two remaining men since Brooks left. Desiree entered the rose ceremony and told Drew and Chris that Brooks had left, and she was visibly upset. She presented each of them with roses. Desiree went on final dates with both Drew and Chris after deciding to remain open to her connections with them. She went on her final date with Drew and sent him home partway through the date. She went on a date with Chris where he gave her a journal containing a heartfelt message along with the poems he has previously written to her. Chris met Desiree's family in Antigua and asked her father for permission to propose to her. Chris proposed to Desiree, and she accepted.
96	12	"After the Final Rose"	August 12, 2013	N/A	8.31	2.5/7
Desiree met with Brooks and Drew, and Chris H. asked questions and gave Brooks and Desiree, and Drew and Desiree, the opportunity to tie up any loose ends. Desiree and Chris made their first public appearance since the proposal. Des announced that she will be moving to Seattle to be with Chris and has made the move to the city in which Chris lives. In order to move to Seattle, Desiree gave up her job as a stylist in a bridal boutique in Los Angeles. It was announced that Juan Pablo, who was eliminated in the sixth episode of this season, will be the star of the 18th season of The Bachelor. Months later after the season ends, Des is creating one-of-a-kind dresses from the apartment she shares with Chris. They live near Jason and Molly Mesnick (from The Bachelor season 13) and socialize with them and their two children (Jason's son from his first marriage and Jason and Molly's daughter). Videos of the four "official" marriages from The Bachelor and The Bachelorette were aired on January 19, 2014. The first marriage was Trista and Ryan Sutter who have celebrated their 10th wedding anniversary and who have two children. The other couples are the Mesnicks, Ashley and J.P. Rosenbaum, and Sean Lowe and Catherine Guidici, as the couple were later married over five months after it was televised. This franchise has resulted in "non-official" weddings. "Non-official" weddings are couples from different seasons who meet at franchise events and meet and marry a contestant.
