= Andi Dorfman =

American television personality (born 1987)

- Born: April 3, 1987 (age 39); Atlanta, Georgia, U.S.
- Education: Louisiana State University (BS); Wake Forest University (JD)
- Occupation: TV personality
- Spouse: Blaine Hart (m. 2023)
- Children: 2
- Relatives: Tommy Dorfman (cousin)

Andi Janette Dorfman (born April 3, 1987) is an American television personality. She was a contestant on the eighteenth season of The Bachelor, and the lead on tenth season of The Bachelorette. She became famous for walking out on bachelor Juan Pablo Galavis in the ninth episode of The Bachelor. She became the first former attorney to appear as The Bachelorette.

== Early life and education ==
Dorfman was born in Atlanta, Georgia, she has brother Tommy Dorfman. She earned a Bachelor of Science in communication from Louisiana State University in 2009 and a Juris Doctor from the Wake Forest University School of Law in 2012. She decided to freeze her eggs at the age of 29. She is Jewish.

== Career ==
Dorfman has worked as an assistant district attorney for Fulton County, Georgia.

=== The Bachelor and The Bachelorette ===
During Juan Pablo Galavis' season of The Bachelor (season 18), Dorfman made it to the eighth episode before pulling herself from the competition.

Dorfman then starred in The Bachelorette season 10, which premiered on May 19, 2014. She was the first Jewish woman to star in this role. She took leave from her job as an assistant district attorney to be on the show. She later resigned from her position rather than ask for additional leave. Her choice as the winner was Josh Murray, to whom she became engaged in May; on January 8, 2015, Murray and Dorfman announced their decision to end their engagement.

On February 20, 2017, she made a surprise appearance on Nick Viall's season of The Bachelor; Viall had been Murray's runner-up during Dorfman's Bachelorette season and had sharply questioned her choice of Murray during the season finale. Following Dorfman's breakup with Murray, she wrote a book titled "It's Not Okay", detailing their tumultuous relationship and breakup, which was referenced by numerous contestants in season three of Bachelor in Paradise.

== Personal life ==
She is a cousin of actress Tommy Dorfman.

In 2021, Dorfman reconnected with Blaine Hart while travelling. She announced their engagement on March 30, 2022. Dorfman and Hart were married in Sorrento, Italy on May 31, 2023. In early August 2024, was announced that the couple is expecting their first child, following a natural conception. On December 20, 2024, Dorfman and Hart welcomed their first child, a girl. On June 18, 2026, Dorfman announced that she is expecting their second child. In November 2026, Dorfman and Hart welcomed their second child, a boy.

== Bibliography ==
- Dorfman, Andi (January 31, 2017). It's Not Okay: Turning Heartbreak into Happily Never After. Gallery Publishing Group. ISBN 978-1-5011-7139-0.
- Dorfman, Andi (January 9, 2018). Single State of Mind. Gallery Publishing Group. ISBN 978-1-5011-7422-3.

Preceded by Desiree Hartsock	The Bachelorette; Season 10	Succeeded by Kaitlyn Bristowe
