= Bachelor in Paradise (American TV series) season 2 =

Season of television series

Bachelor in Paradise
- Season 2
- Promotional poster
- No. of episodes: 12

Release
- Original network: ABC
- Original release: August 2 – September 7, 2015

Season chronology
- ← Previous; Season 1 Next → Season 3

The second season of Bachelor in Paradise premiered on August 2, 2015. Chris Harrison reprises his role from The Bachelor and The Bachelorette as the host of the show.

== Production ==
Like in the previous season, it continued filming in Mexico but this time, it is taking place in the town of Sayulita, located in Vallarta-Nayarit, Mexico.

== Contestants ==
Prior to start of the season, Ashley Salter of The Bachelor, season 19 was offered a spot to join the show during that season's Women Tell All and later accepted the offer.

10 of the other 15 contestants from the original cast were revealed on June 10, 2015.

Four castoffs from the most recent season of The Bachelorette were announced after their eliminations on The Bachelorette aired.

Lauren Iaconetti, the sister of Bachelor season 19 contestant Ashley Iaconetti, became the first sibling of a Bachelor contestant to appear on a spin-off without competing as a contestant on the main show.

Name	Age	Residence	From	Arrived	Outcome
Tanner Tolbert	28	Kansas City, Missouri	The Bachelorette – Kaitlyn	Week 1	Engaged
Jade Roper	28	Los Angeles, California	The Bachelor – Chris	Week 1	Engaged
Nick Peterson	30	Tampa, Florida	The Bachelorette – Ashley; Bachelor Pad – Season 3	Week 4	Relationship
Samantha Steffen	28	Beverly Hills, California	The Bachelor – Chris	Week 3	Relationship
Justin Reich	28	Naperville, Illinois	The Bachelorette – Kaitlyn	Week 4	Relationship
Cassandra Ferguson	23	Detroit, Michigan	The Bachelor – Juan Pablo	Week 5	Relationship
Joshua Albers	31	Kuna, Idaho	The Bachelorette – Kaitlyn	Week 2	Split Week 6
Tenley Molzahn	31	Encinitas, California	The Bachelor – Jake; Bachelor Pad – Season 1	Week 1	Split Week 6
Kirk DeWindt	32	Minneapolis, Minnesota	The Bachelorette – Ali; Bachelor Pad – Season 2	Week 1	Split Week 6
Carly Waddell	29	Nashville, Tennessee	The Bachelor – Chris	Week 1	Split Week 6
Amber James	30	Chicago, Illinois	The Bachelor – Chris	Week 3	Week 5
Ashley Salter	25	Alpharetta, Georgia	The Bachelor – Chris	Week 1	Week 5
Chelsie Webster	25	Galloway, Ohio	The Bachelor – Juan Pablo	Week 5	Week 5
Jaclyn Swartz	30	Chicago, Illinois	The Bachelor – Ben F. Bachelor Pad – Season 3	Week 5	Week 5
Mikey Tenerelli	32	Winfield, Illinois	The Bachelorette – Desiree	Week 1 Week 4	Week 2 (Returned) Week 5 (Quit)
Mackenzie Deonigi	22	Seattle, Washington	The Bachelor – Chris	Week 5	Week 5 (Quit)
Dan Cox	32	Las Vegas, Nevada	The Bachelorette – Desiree	Week 1	Week 5 (Quit)
Jared Haibon	26	Providence, Rhode Island	The Bachelorette – Kaitlyn	Week 1	Split Week 5
Ashley Iaconetti	27	Wayne, New Jersey	The Bachelor – Chris	Week 1	Split Week 5
Juelia Kinney	30	San Diego, California	The Bachelor – Chris	Week 1 Week 4	Week 3 (Returned) Week 5 (Quit)
Joe Bailey	29	Columbia, Kentucky	The Bachelorette – Kaitlyn	Week 2	Week 4
Chris Bukowski	28	Chicago, Illinois	The Bachelorette – Emily; Bachelor Pad – Season 3 Bachelor in Paradise – Season 1	Week 4	Week 4 (Quit)
Clare Crawley	34	Sacramento, California	The Bachelor – Juan Pablo; Bachelor in Paradise – Season 1	Week 1	Week 3
Megan Bell	24	New York City, New York	The Bachelor – Chris	Week 3	Week 3
JJ Lane	32	Denver, Colorado	The Bachelorette – Kaitlyn	Week 1	Week 3 (Quit)
Jonathan Holloway	33	Detroit, Michigan	The Bachelorette – Kaitlyn	Week 1	Week 2
Michael Garofola	35	Houston, Texas	The Bachelorette – Desiree	Week 2	Week 2
Lauren Iaconetti	24	Wayne, New Jersey	None	Week 1	Week 2 (Quit)
Jillian Anderson	26	Washington, D.C.	The Bachelor – Chris	Week 1	Week 1

== Elimination Table ==
Place	Contestant	Week						
Place	Contestant	1	2	3	4	5	6	
1-6	Tanner	Date	In	In	Date	In	In	Engaged
1-6	Jade	Date	In	In	Date	In	In	Engaged
1-6	Nick	Wait			Date	Date	In	Relationship
1-6	Samantha	Wait		Date	In	Date	In	Relationship
1-6	Justin	Wait			Date	Date	In	Relationship
1-6	Cassandra	Wait				Last	In	Relationship
7-8	Tenley	Last	Date	In	Date	In	In	Split
7-8	Joshua	Wait	Date	In	Date	In	In	Split
9-10	Carly	In	In	Date	In	In	Split	
9-10	Kirk	In	In	Date	In	In	Split	
11-14	Ashley S.	Date	In	In	Date	Out		
11-14	Amber	Wait		Last	Date	Out		
11-14	Jaclyn	Wait				Out		
11-14	Chelsie	Wait				Out		
15	Mikey	Date	Out	Back	Date	Quit		
16	Mackenzie	Wait				Quit		
17	Dan	Date	In	Date	Last	Quit		
18-19	Jared	Date	Date	In	In	Split		
18-19	Ashley I.	Date	In	In	In	Split		
20	Juelia	In	Date	Save	Date	Quit		
21	Joe	Wait	Last	Date	Out			
22	Chris	Wait			Quit			
23-24	Clare	Date	Date	Out				
23-24	Megan	Wait		Out				
25	JJ	In	In	Quit				
26-27	Jonathan	In	Out					
26-27	Michael	Wait	Out					
28	Lauren	In	Quit					
29	Jillian	Out						

=== Key ===
The contestant is male.
The contestant is female.
Date The contestant had a date and gave out a rose at the rose ceremony.
Date The contestant went on a date and got a rose at the rose ceremony.
In The contestant gave or received a rose at the rose ceremony, thus remaining in the competition.
Last The contestant received the last rose.
Last The contestant went on a date and received the last rose.
Out The contestant went on a date and was eliminated.
Out The contestant was eliminated.
Quit The contestant went on a date and rejected a rose and ended up quitting.
Quit The contestant had a date and voluntarily left the show
Quit The contestant voluntarily left the show.
Quit The contestant left the show after admitting they were in a relationship back home.
Split The couple broke up and were eliminated.
Stay The couple decided to stay together and won the competition.
Wait The contestant had to wait to appear in paradise.
Back The contestant returned at the end of the episode at the request of another contestant.
Save The contestant was saved when a previously eliminated contestant returned.
Split/Stay The couple split, but later got back together.

== Episodes ==
No. overall	No. in season	Title	Original release date	Prod. code	U.S. viewers (millions)	Rating/share (18–49)
8	1	"Week 1: Part 1 (Season Premiere)"	August 2, 2015	201A	3.60	1.1/4
9	2	"Week 1: Part 2"	August 3, 2015	201B	4.66	1.3/5
10	3	"Week 2: Part 1"	August 9, 2015	202A	3.76	1.2/4
11	4	"Week 2: Part 2"	August 10, 2015	202B	5.09	1.5/6
12	5	"Week 3: Part 1"	August 16, 2015	203A	3.98	1.3/5
13	6	"Week 3: Part 2"	August 17, 2015	203B	5.24	1.5/6
14	7	"Week 4: Part 1"	August 23, 2015	204A	4.21	1.3/4
15	8	"Week 4: Part 2"	August 24, 2015	204B	5.58	1.8/6
16	9	"Week 5: Part 1"	August 30, 2015	205A	4.40	1.3/4
17	10	"Week 5: Part 2"	August 31, 2015	205B	5.24	1.5/6
18	11	"Week 6: Part 1"	September 6, 2015	206A	3.88	1.1/4
19	12	"Week 6: Part 2 (Season Finale)"	September 7, 2015	206B	4.82	1.5/4

=== Week 1 ===
Airdate: August 2 and 3, 2015

Arrival Order: Jade, Jared, Tenley, Carly, Jonathan, Tanner, Mikey, Ashley I. brings her sister Lauren, Juelia, Kirk, Dan, Jillian, JJ, Ashley S.

Chris Harrison announces that if Ashley I. gets a rose, Lauren will get to stay even if she doesn't get one and vice versa. He then brings everyone to see the wedding of Marcus and Lacy, a couple from last season of Bachelor in Paradise.

Ashley I's date: Ashley took Jared on a date and they rode 4 wheelers.

Jade's date: Jade and Tanner had a dinner date. Tanner said he didn't have a problem with Jade's playboy past and the two shared a kiss.

Clare Crawley from the last season of Bachelor in Paradise arrived.

Clare's date: Clare had to take Mikey on a date because everyone else was taken, and she wasn't too happy about it at first. During the date, she saw that maybe Mikey was a better guy than she thought.

Ashley S's date: Ashley took Dan on a date and they had dinner.

Rose Ceremony: Tanner gave his rose to Jade, Kirk gave his rose to Carly, Dan gave his rose to Ashley S., Jonathan gave his rose to Juelia, Mikey gave his rose to Clare, Jared gave his rose to Ashley I. which saved Lauren, and JJ gave the final rose to Tenley, eliminating Jillian.

=== Week 2 ===
Airdate: August 9 and 10, 2015

Joshua Albers from Kaitlyn's season arrives, bringing a date card with him. Lauren likes Josh and decides that if he doesn't ask her, she will quit. He asks someone else so she leaves. Lauren admits she has been having an affair with a man back home.

Josh's date: Josh asks Tenley on a date, which upset JJ, who also was interested in Tenley. They go out to a club and go dancing.

Joe Bailey, also from Kaitlyn's season, arrives with another date card.

Joe's date: Joe takes Juelia on a date, where he takes her to a waterfall. In interviews Joe admits he doesn't care about Juelia and just wants her rose, while Juelia thinks their date was great and is into him.

Jared's date: Jared asked Clare on a date, which upset both Ashley I. and Mikey. During the date, they went sailing to a small island, and then went bungee jumping.

Michael Garofola from Desiree's season arrives.

Michael's date: Michael took Tenley on a dinner date where a mariachi band played for them. After this there were three guys pursuing Tenley: JJ, Josh, and Michael.

Jared and Clare had an argument and ended their relationship, and Jared later shared a kiss with Ashley I. At the cocktail party, Clare makes a speech about how she thinks the people from last season of Bachelor in Paradise were more genuine, and this upsets everyone.

Rose Ceremony: Before any roses are handed out, Jade calls out Clare for her speech that people found offensive. Carly gave her rose to Kirk, Ashley S. gave her rose to Dan, Jade gave her rose to Tanner, Tenley gave her rose to Joshua. Before everyone has handed out their rose, Clare walks out and tells Chris Harrison that she isn't sure if she should be there, and the episode ends on a cliffhanger.

=== Week 3 ===
Airdate: August 16 and 17

Continuing from the previous episode Clare decides to stay and the rose ceremony continues. Ashley I. then gives her rose to Jared, Clare gives her rose to JJ, and Juelia gives the final rose to Joe over Mikey. Mikey, Jonathan and Michael eliminating all three.

Samantha's Date: Samantha Steffen from Chris' season arrived and asks Joe on a date. They did a photo shoot for People Magazine. When they get back they make out in front of everyone which upsets Juelia, who previously thought that she and Joe had a connection and is good friends with Samantha. Juelia confronts both Joe and Samantha, but neither of them say much to her. Tanner later tells people that Joe told him about how he talked to Samantha before the show started, which upsets everyone and turns everyone against both Joe and Samantha.

Carly's Date: Carly takes Kirk on a date and they see fireworks. Kirk tells her he isn't sure about their future. Carly calls her brother Zak, whose wedding was that day, and this makes Kirk feel better. They stay together overnight in the fantasy suite.

Dan breaks up with Ashley S., saying he sees many red flags, which upsets her.

Megan's Date: Megan Bell, also from Chris' season asks JJ on a date and they go on a yacht and go jet-skiing.

Amber's Date: Amber James arrives and takes Dan on a date which upsets Ashley S. who she is good friends with. They walk around a town.

The episode ends on another cliffhanger with JJ confronting Joe about his relationship with Samantha prior to the show.

=== Week 4 ===
Airdate: August 23 and 24

Joe gets angry and walks away from JJ. Juelia asks Chris Harrison if it is possible to bring Mikey back, and he says he'll see.

Rose Ceremony: Joshua gives his rose to Tenley, Jared gives his rose to Ashley I., Kirk gives his rose to Carly, Tanner gives his rose to Jade. JJ then shockingly gives Ashley S. his rose, then says that he is going to go home and try to get back together with someone he broke up with to go on the show. Joe then gives his rose to Samantha, and Dan gives the final rose to Amber. Juelia thinks she is going home, but when she is about to leave Mikey shows up and saves her. Clare and Megan were eliminated.

Tanner's Date: Tanner receives a date card right after the rose ceremony ends and he takes Jade on a date. They go to a winery in Tequila and then have a romantic overnight date.

Nick Peterson, the winner of the third season of Bachelor Pad arrives with a date card, claiming to have been in contact with Samantha before the show.

Nick's Date: Nick asks Samantha on a date but she says no since she is with Joe, so Nick then asks Ashley S. The two take tequila shots and quickly get drunk and make out in the hot tub.

Jared breaks up with Ashley I. claiming he isn't over Kaitlyn. Ashley calls Kaitlyn saying "He's obsessed with you."

It's Joe's birthday, and he makes a cake for him and Samantha since everybody else hates Joe. Samantha breaks up with him. Ashley I. and Joe, who both were just dumped, have a conversation and Ashley unsuccessfully tries to help Joe get back with Samantha.

Mikey's Date: Mikey receives a date card and asks Juelia on a date. They go to a wrestling match and have an overnight date.

Justin Reich from Kaitlyn's season arrives and asks Samantha on a date and she accepts, upsetting Joe, who is friends with Justin.

=== Week 5 ===
Airdate: August 30 and 31

Samantha changes her mind about going on a date with Justin and gets back together with Joe. Justin then asks Amber on his date and she accepts, wanting to make Dan, who just broke up with her, jealous.

Justin's Date: Justin and Amber walk along a beach. Although the two of them kiss, Amber is feeling like Justin is more of a friend.

Chris Bukowski, making his fifth appearance on a bachelor show, arrives with a date card. He spends the whole day drinking and finally asks Tenley for a date. She declines. Joshua asks Chris if he can use the date card and Chris gives it to Joshua and departs.

Joshua's Date: Joshua takes Tenley on a date and they eat with a famous chef named Francisco.

Multiple events occur at the cocktail party. Ashley I. writes a lengthy note to Jared describing her feelings. Amber then decides that she is also interested in Jared. Dan then starts to have an interest in Samantha and talks to her about Joe. During the talk, Joe takes her away and kisses her.

Rose Ceremony: Carly gives her rose to Kirk, Jade gives her rose to Tanner, Tenley gives her rose to Joshua, Juelia gives her rose to Mikey, and Ashley S. gives her rose to Nick. Ashley I. then gives her rose to Jared before Amber can, and Amber gives her rose to Justin even though she isn't romantically interested in him. Samantha gives the final rose to Dan over Joe, who is eliminated. He makes several bitter remarks on the way out and holds his cell phone up to the camera to show the messages that Samantha had sent to him earlier.

After the rose ceremony, Chelsie from Juan Pablo's season arrives and Carly tries to convince her to take Dan on a date so that Dan will give his rose to Chelsie and send Samantha home.

Chelsie's Date: Chelsie takes Nick on a date and they ride on a boat. Nick is only seeing Chelsie as a friend and admits he is still interested in Samantha.

Mackenzie Deonigi from Chris' season arrives and asks Justin on a date.

Mackenzie's Date: Mackenzie and Justin meet a man and he performs a ceremony on them. The two then realize that he is "marrying" them. When they get back to the house, Mackenzie acts like they are actually married, which Justin thinks is odd.

Jaclyn Swartz from Ben's season and the third season of Bachelor Pad arrives and claims she wants to "steal someone's boyfriend". She is most interested in Jared. Ashley I. asks Chris Harrison to provide her with an overnight date card so that she can find out exactly where she stands with Jared, at a risk to her virginity. Ashley finds Jared and Jaclyn talking and asks Jared on the date just as Jaclyn was about to ask Jared.

=== Week 6 ===
Ashley I's Date: Ashley and Jared had an overnight date and it is apparent that she did not lose her virginity.

Mikey breaks up with Juelia and says he's seeing her as more of a friend, so Juelia decides to go home.

Jaclyn asks Justin on a date and he says yes. Then Cassandra Ferguson from Juan Pablo's season arrives and also asks Justin on a date. Justin tells Jaclyn that he can't go on the date with her and goes with Cassandra.

Cassandra's Date: Justin and Cassandra go horseback riding. They bond and talk about how they both have kids, and they kiss on the beach.

Nick asks Jaclyn if he can have her date card since she doesn't have anyone and he wants to go on a date with Samantha. Jaclyn, holding a grudge against him for eliminating her on Bachelor Pad and preventing her from winning $250,000, makes him roll around in the sand and embarrass himself to get the date card.

Nick's Date: Nick asked Samantha on a date and ate with a chef named Josefina Santacruz. They have a good conversation and kiss.

Jared breaks up with Ashley and goes home, which leaves her with no one else she's interested in. She later leaves at the cocktail party.

Rose Ceremony: Kirk gives his rose to Carly, Tanner gives his rose to Jade, Nick gives his rose to Samantha, Joshua gives his rose to Tenley, and Justin gives his rose to Cassandra. Dan decides not to give out his rose and leave since there was no one he was interested in. Mikey offers Mackenzie a rose but she says no and departs. Mikey then leaves as well. Jaclyn, Ashley S., Chelsie, and Amber are eliminated.

Chris Harrison tells the couples that they need to start thinking of whether they can stay together back home and that they will each be getting a 1-1 date that will lead to a fantasy suite. Before the dates begin, Kirk breaks up with Carly and everyone gets angry at him.

Justin and Cassandra have a good date but Cassandra decides she doesn't want to stay in the fantasy suite because it's too early. Nick and Samantha also have a good date and go to the fantasy suite. During Tenley's date with Joshua, she tells him she isn't sure if they can have a relationship outside of Paradise. Tanner and Jade have a great date and Tanner tells Jade he loves her, and she says it back to him.

Rose Ceremony: Justin and Cassandra exchange roses and leave Paradise together as a couple. Nick and Samantha do the same. Tenley breaks up with Joshua, saying she thinks they can't work out due to the long distance. Tanner proposes to Jade, and she happily accepts.

During the end credits it is revealed that JJ failed to win back the girl he left Paradise for and is available on Tindr. Ashley I. is still obsessed with Jared, while Jared is still obsessed with Kaitlyn. Clare is still talking to animals, Joe is still single and unhappy, and Kirk is enrolled in the witness protection program. Tanner and Jade are planning a wedding in Mexico next summer. During the after show we learn that Cassandra and Justin broke up and she began dating Jonathan, who was also on this season of Bachelor in Paradise, while Tanner and Jade are still happily together.

== Post Show ==
Cassandra and Justin broke up before the show finished airing.

Samantha and Nick broke up in October 2015.

Jade and Tanner were married on January 24, 2016. Jade and Tanner have three children together, Emerson Avery (born August 17, 2017), Brooks Easton (born July 29, 2019), and Reed Harrison (born November 14, 2020).

Jared and Ashley finally became a couple in 2018. They got engaged in June of that year. Ashley and Jared were married on August 11, 2019. Ashley and Jared have one son together, Dawson Dimitri Brady (born January 31, 2022).
