= Burlacii: Foc în Paradis =

Romanian reality television series

- Also known as: Burlacii: Foc în paradis
- Genre: Reality
- Created by: Mike Fleiss
- Based on: Bachelor in Paradise
- Directed by: Antonii Mangov
- Presented by: Adelina Pestrițu
- Country of origin: Romania
- Original language: Romanian
- No. of seasons: 1
- No. of episodes: TBA

Production
- Production location: Turkey
- Camera setup: Multi-camera
- Production company: Warner Bros. International Television Production

Original release
- Network: Pro TV, Voyo

Burlacii: Foc în Paradis is an Romanian elimination-style reality competition television series which is an adaptation of the Bachelor in Paradise. The show will be hosted by Adelina Pestrițu, with its premiere scheduled for September 14, 2026 on Pro TV and Voyo.

== Plot ==
The show debut with 13 contestants entering the competition and trying to find their match. However, the rules of the game will change as the show progresses. New participants will join the show, while others will leave the competition, depending on the relationships they manage to build. To remain in the competition, contestants must form couples and receive a rose during the elimination ceremony. Whoever is left without a rose will end their journey and go home.The ultimate prize is €50,000.

== Production ==
=== Development ===
On May 18, 2026, Pro TV announced the acquisition of the American format Bachelor in Paradise with the applications for the show being open immediately for every single male and female. The production bring together both new contestants and participants already known from other dating shows. The contestants are placed in an exotic location, where they form couples and develop their relationships throughout the competition. The format is based on the constant changes in relationships between the participants, the arrival of new contestants, romantic connections, and conflicts. During the "rose ceremonies", contestants must form or maintain couples in order to remain in the competition, while those who do not receive a rose are eliminated. The show focuses on romantic relationships, love triangles, rivalries, and unexpected situations resulting from the changing dynamics within the group. "Viewers are increasingly looking for authentic content, with genuine emotion and characters who spark conversation. is exactly the kind of premium format that combines entertainment, visual spectacle and the unpredictable dynamics of modern relationships. It is a dynamic, intense and highly relevant reality show, and we are thrilled to bring this phenomenon to audiences in Romania," said Antonii Mangov, Programming Director at Pro TV.

On July 2, Pro TV announced that Adelina Pestrițu would be the host of the show. Filming for the first season took place between July and August, 2026 in Turkey, near Istanbul. The show begins with an uneven number of women and men, with there being more women. At the first rose ceremony, the men are given a rose to hand out to a woman they would like to spend more time getting to know in paradise. The women left without roses are immediately sent home. New men are then brought to the beach, so at the next rose ceremony, women can give a rose to a man they would like to spend more time with and the remaining men are sent home. For few weeks, this set up alternates between new men or new women joining the cast.

== Contestants ==
The first 13 contestants began to be revealed on August 12. Among the original contestants are also people who have previously participated in dating reality shows, such as Bogdan Mocanu, known for his participation in the Puterea Dragostei, and Nicoleta Balint, Tina Ulmeanu, and Eda Csoregi who were temptresses on Temptation Island - Insula Iubirii. Csoregi also participated as a temptress in the first season of Temptation Island in Hungary.

Name	Age	Residence	Occupation	Arrived	Status
Petruța Anghel	26	Baloteşti, Ilfov	Model	Week 1	
Nicoleta Balint	29		Marketing Specialist	Week 1	
Karim Chaker	23	Bucharest	Basketball Player	Week 1	
Constanția Cornițel	24	Tighina, Moldova	Master’s Student	Week 1	
Eda Csoregi	28	Cluj-Napoca, Cluj	Math teacher	Week 1	
Andreea Eremia	24		General Nurse	Week 1	
Cristina Ionaşcu	26	Cluj-Napoca, Cluj	Model	Week 1	
Robert Jărcălău	25	Bucharest	Entrepreneur	Week 1	
Bogdan Mocanu	28	Bârlad, Vaslui	Kickboxer	Week 1	
Laurențiu Suciu	28	Bucharest	Bodybuilder	Week 1	
Robert Stancu	29	Craiova, Dolj	Real Estate Manager	Week 1	
Călin Șerban	31	Bucharest	Fitness trainer and physiotherapist	Week 1	
Tina Ulmeanu	31		Content creator	Week 1	

== Coupling and elimination history ==
#	Week 1	Week 2	Week 3	Week 4	Week 5	Week 6	Week 7	Week 8	Week 9	Week 10	Week 11	Week 12	Week 13
Andreea													
Bogdan													
Călin													
Constanția													
Cristina													
Eda													
Karim													
Laurențiu													
Nicoleta													
Petruța													
Robert J.													
Robert S.													
Tina													

=== Key ===
Date The contestant went on a date and gave out a rose at the rose ceremony
Date The contestant went on a date and got a rose at the rose ceremony
In The contestant gave or received a rose at the rose ceremony, thus remaining in the competition
Last The contestant received the last rose
Last The contestant went on a date and received the last rose
Out The contestant went on a date and was eliminated
Out The contestant was eliminated
Quit The contestant went on a date and rejected a rose
Quit The contestant had a date and voluntarily left the show
Quit The contestant voluntarily left the show
Out The contestant was medically evacuated.
Split The couple broke up and was eliminated
Split The couple had a date, then broke up and was eliminated
Split The contestant split after Bachelor in Paradise ended
Stay The couple decided to stay together
Wait The contestant had to wait before appearing in paradise
Split/Stay The contestant split then started dating again after paradise
Split/Stay The contestant split before a rose ceremony and started dating again after BIP ended

== Ratings ==
Episode	Original airdate	Timeslot (EET)	National				Commercial (21–54 Urban ABCD)			Source
Episode	Original airdate	Timeslot (EET)	Rank	Viewers (in thousands)	Rating (%)	Share (%)	Rank	Rating (%)	Share (%)	Source
1	September 14, 2026	Monday	#				#			
