= Sean Lowe (television personality) =

American reality television personality (born 1983)

- Born: November 16, 1983 (age 42); Arlington, Texas, U.S.
- Education: Lamar High School
- Alma mater: Kansas State University
- Occupation: Reality TV Personality/Author
- Height: 6 ft 3 in (1.91 m)
- Spouse: Catherine Giudici (m. 2014)
- Children: 3
- Parent(s): Jay Lowe; Sherry Lowe

Sean Thomas Lowe (born November 16, 1983) is an American reality TV personality and author, best known for his role on the seventeenth season of ABC's The Bachelor, which he earned by becoming the fan favorite during his time on the eighth season of The Bachelorette with Emily Maynard, where he placed third.

== Early life ==
Lowe was born in Arlington, Texas, to Jay and Sherry Lowe, both devout Christians. He was raised in Irving, Texas, and has an older sister, Shay. Lowe played football from a very young age and graduated at Lamar High School, and in which he was a member of Fellowship of Christian Athletes. He later attended Texas A&M University for one semester prior to transferring to Kansas State University where he received a football scholarship and took part in the 2003 Big 12 Championship Game.

== Television shows ==
=== The Bachelorette (2012) ===
Sean was the third-place finalist on Emily Maynard's season of The Bachelorette. He ended up going on two one-on-one dates with Maynard and one group date. In the ninth episode, Sean told Maynard that he was falling in love with her. Emily offered him an overnight date card to spend more time with him, but he did not stay the night as it didn't line up with Emily's beliefs and the example that she wanted to set for her daughter. Lowe was eliminated that same episode, despite being a front runner throughout the competition. He was heart-broken on the limo ride home. After sending him home, Maynard commented that she just sent home "the perfect guy."

Lowe was a fan favorite in Emily Maynard's season of the show. He was chosen to be the Bachelor for the following season.

=== The Bachelor (2013) ===
On the first episode, it was revealed that Sean would have a total of 26 women to choose from, instead of the usual 25. Sean eliminated Desiree Hartsock in the eighth episode. Hartsock went on to be cast as the star of the ninth season of The Bachelorette. In the season finale, Sean proposed to contestant Catherine Giudici.

==== Sean and Catherine's Wedding ====
Over a year after he proposed to Catherine Giudici on his season of The Bachelor, the two were married on January 26, 2014, in a live television ceremony performed at the Four Seasons Resort Biltmore in Santa Barbara. Sean's father, Jay Lowe, officiated at the wedding.

=== Dancing with the Stars ===
Following The Bachelor, Lowe was a contestant on the ABC reality show Dancing with the Stars; his partner was season 14 champion Peta Murgatroyd. Lowe became the 12th and final celebrity be announced for the cast. Lowe was eliminated in week 8, placing sixth place overall.

=== Celebrity Family Feud ===
Lowe and his wife Catherine participated in the 2nd episode of the 2015 airing of Celebrity Family Feud. "Team Bachelor" won their game and won $25,000 for their charity, Free the Children.

=== Celebrity Wife Swap ===
Lowe and his wife Catherine participated in Celebrity Wife Swap in 2015, swapping with former Bachelor Jason Mesnick.

=== Marriage Boot Camp: Reality Stars 4 ===
Lowe along with his wife Catherine Lowe were cast in Marriage Boot Camp: Reality Stars 4.

=== Who Wants to Be A Millionaire ===
Lowe along with his wife Catherine Lowe were on the U.S. game show Who Wants to Be A Millionaire?: Bachelor Fan Favorites on November 2, 2015, with new host Chris Harrison.

=== Worst Cooks in America: Celebrity Edition 3 ===
Lowe was cast in Worst Cooks in America: Celebrity Edition 3. He competed in Rachael Ray's team and finished in 4th place.

== Personal life ==
Lowe is known for his strong faith. When asked to categorize which denomination his religion falls under, he responded "I'm a Christian. And that's how I categorize myself, and you know, that's obviously a huge part of my life as most people know, and that's what's most important to me."

He has one dog, Ellie.

He occasionally goes on speaking trips. On October 1, 2014, he and his wife Catherine appeared at BreakthroughYM, River of Life Church in Cold Spring, MN. The following year, on the 11th of October, they visited the Covina Assembly of God in Covina, CA, and had an interview with Lowe's fast and recent friend, Pastor Lee McFarland. Sean Lowe released his first memoir in 2015.

Lowe and Giudici's first son was born in 2016, another son was born in 2018, and their daughter was born in 2019.

Preceded by Ben Flajnik	The Bachelor; Season 17	Succeeded by Juan Pablo Galavis
