= Bachelor in Paradise (American TV series) =

American reality television series

- Genre: Reality competition
- Presented by: Chris Harrison; Jesse Palmer
- Opening theme: "Almost Paradise" by Mike Reno and Ann Wilson
- Country of origin: United States
- Original language: English
- No. of seasons: 10
- No. of episodes: 110 (list of episodes)

Production
- Executive producers: Mike Fleiss; Martin Hilton; Nicole Woods; Elan Gale; Tim Warner
- Production locations: Mexico (seasons 1–9); Costa Rica (season 10–)
- Running time: 120 minutes 60 minutes (season 2)
- Production companies: Next Entertainment (seasons 1–9); Warner Horizon Unscripted Television (Note: Known as Warner Horizon Television until 2020)

Original release
- Network: ABC
- Release: August 4, 2014 – present

Related
- The Bachelor; The Bachelorette; Bachelor Pad; Bachelor in Paradise: After Paradise; The Bachelor Winter Games

Bachelor in Paradise is an American elimination-style reality competition television series, which premiered on August 4, 2014, on ABC. It is a spin-off of the American reality television shows The Bachelor and The Bachelorette. The show features previous contestants who have been featured on The Bachelor and The Bachelorette as they travel to a secluded paradise in Mexico, where the first nine seasons took place. The show moved to Costa Rica beginning in season ten. The show was originally hosted by Chris Harrison until his departure from The Bachelor franchise in 2021. Jesse Palmer currently hosts the show.

On April 22, 2026, ABC renewed Bachelor in Paradise for an eleventh season, which is set to air on Summer 2027.

== Production ==
=== Development and filming ===
In March 2013, ABC canceled Bachelor Pad after three seasons. The show premiered in 2010, providing former contestants from The Bachelor and The Bachelorette with an opportunity to gain additional screen time and participate in an elimination-style competition. Very similar to Bachelor Pad, rejected contestants from The Bachelor and The Bachelorette are isolated in a romantic paradise in an exotic tropical destination. The first season was filmed in Tulum, Mexico. From season 2 to 9, the show was filmed in Sayulita, Mexico, at Playa Escondida. Beginning in season 10, the show would be taking place in Costa Rica.

The show begins with an uneven number of women and men, with there being more women. At the first rose ceremony, the men are given a rose to hand out to a woman they would like to spend more time getting to know in paradise. The women left without roses are immediately sent home. New men are then brought to the beach, so at the next rose ceremony, women can give a rose to a man they would like to spend more time with and the remaining men are sent home. For seven weeks, this set up alternates between new men or new women joining the cast.

=== Misconduct allegations ===
During initial filming of season 4, production was halted due to allegations of sexual misconduct between two contestants—DeMario Jackson and Corinne Olympios. After an internal investigation, it was determined that there was no misconduct and filming resumed shortly after.

== After Paradise ==
Beginning in 2015, ABC began airing Bachelor in Paradise: After Paradise, a regular weekly live after show. Chris Harrison and Jenny Mollen co-hosted the show starring a celebrity fan and one of the Bachelor in Paradise cast members. Season 2 saw the introduction of comedian and talk show host Michelle Collins, who co-hosted After Paradise alongside Bachelor season 17 star Sean Lowe.

== Season summary ==
Season	Original Run	Couples	Proposal	Still together?	Relationship notes
1	August 4 – September 8, 2014	Marcus Grodd & Lacy Faddoul	Yes	No	Grodd and Faddoul got engaged in the finale and had a wedding ceremony in June 2015 on the season 2 premiere. They ended their relationship in June 2016 and revealed that they were never legally a married couple.
1	August 4 – September 8, 2014	Cody Sattler & Michelle Money	No	No	Sattler and Money began a relationship and split up in December 2014, but they later got back together in June 2015. The two later broke up again after appearing on the seventh season of Marriage Boot Camp.
2	August 2 – September 7, 2015	Tanner Tolbert & Jade Roper	Yes	Yes	Tolbert and Roper were married on January 24, 2016, with their wedding airing on ABC as a special edition of The Bachelor: A Celebration of Love. The couple later appeared on the eighth season of Marriage Boot Camp. They live in Overland Park, Kansas, with their three children; Emerson (born August 17, 2017), Brooks (born July 29, 2019), and Reed (born November 14, 2020).
2	August 2 – September 7, 2015	Justin Reich & Cassandra Ferguson	No	No	Reich and Ferguson revealed on After Paradise that they had broken up.
2	August 2 – September 7, 2015	Nick Peterson & Samantha Steffen	No	No	Peterson and Steffan announced their breakup on October 9, 2015.
3	August 2 – September 6, 2016	Evan Bass & Carly Waddell	Yes	No	Bass and Waddell were married on June 17, 2017, in Mexico, and their wedding aired during season 4. They have a daughter Isabella (born February 15, 2018), and a son Charles (born November 13, 2019). However, they announced their separation on December 23, 2020.
3	August 2 – September 6, 2016	Grant Kemp & Lace Morris	Yes	No	Kemp and Morris announced their breakup on November 29, 2016.
3	August 2 – September 6, 2016	Josh Murray & Amanda Stanton	Yes	No	Murray and Stanton announced their breakup on January 3, 2017.
4	August 14 – September 11, 2017	Derek Peth & Taylor Nolan	Yes (Note: Peth and Nolan got engaged during the reunion.)	No	Peth and Nolan announced their breakup on June 26, 2018.
4	August 14 – September 11, 2017	Adam Gottschalk & Raven Gates	No	Yes	Gottschalk and Gates left Paradise in a relationship. They got engaged on May 31, 2019, and were married on April 16, 2021. They live in Dallas, Texas, with their two sons, Gates (born January 18, 2022), and Max (born July 23, 2023).
4	August 14 – September 11, 2017	Daniel Maguire & Lacey Mark	No	No	Maguire and Mark left Paradise in a relationship, but at the reunion it was revealed that they had since broken up.
5	August 7 – September 11, 2018	Chris Randone & Krystal Nielson	Yes	No	Randone and Nielson were married on June 16, 2019, in Mexico, and their wedding aired during season 6. They announced their separation in February 2020 and filed for divorce in August of that year. Their divorce was finalized on December 22, 2020.
5	August 7 – September 11, 2018	Jordan Kimball & Jenna Cooper	Yes	No	While filming the reunion, Kimball and Cooper announced their wedding was set for June 9, 2019, but a day before the reunion aired, it was announced that Kimball had broken up with Cooper after he discovered that she was allegedly cheating on him the whole time. It was later revealed that all of the evidence alleging that Cooper had cheated was fabricated.
5	August 7 – September 11, 2018	Kamil Nicalek & Annaliese Puccini	No	No	Nicalek and Puccini left Paradise in a relationship, but at the reunion he broke up with her onstage.
5	August 7 – September 11, 2018	Joe Amabile & Kendall Long	No	No	Although they initially split during the show, it was revealed at the reunion that Amabile and Long had gotten back together. However, they announced their breakup on January 29, 2020.
5	August 7 – September 11, 2018	Kevin Wendt & Astrid Loch	No	Yes	Although they initially split during the show, it was revealed at the reunion that Wendt and Loch had gotten back together. They got engaged on August 28, 2019, and they married on October 28, 2022. They live in Toronto, Ontario, with their two sons, August (born November 20, 2021), and Nash (born October 7, 2023).
6	August 5 – September 17, 2019	Chris Bukowski & Katie Morton	Yes	No	Bukowski and Morton announced their breakup on December 10, 2019. Bukowski began dating Season 7's Anna Redman in 2021; they became engaged in December 2025.
6	August 5 – September 17, 2019	Demi Burnett & Kristian Haggerty	Yes	No	After Burnett proposed to Haggerty during the show, Haggerty proposed to Burnett during the reunion. However, they announced their breakup on October 31, 2019. Burnett and Haggerty were the first same-sex couple to be featured on the American version of the show.
6	August 5 – September 17, 2019	Dylan Barbour & Hannah Godwin	Yes	Yes	Barbour and Godwin married on August 23, 2023, in Paris. They live in San Diego, California.
6	August 5 – September 17, 2019	Dean Unglert & Caelynn Miller-Keyes	No	Yes	Unglert and Miller-Keyes left Paradise as a couple in week 5. They got engaged on October 24, 2022. They married on September 23, 2023, and both changed their surnames to Bell in honor of his late mother. They live in Carbondale, Colorado.
6	August 5 – September 17, 2019	John Paul Jones & Tayshia Adams	No	No	Although they initially split during the show, it was revealed at the reunion that Jones and Adams had gotten back together. They announced their breakup on October 30, 2019.
7	August 16 – October 5, 2021	Joe Amabile & Serena Pitt	Yes	Yes	Amabile and Pitt were legally married on October 27, 2022, and had their official wedding ceremony on September 2, 2023, in Charleston, South Carolina. They live in New York City.
7	August 16 – October 5, 2021	Kenny Braasch & Mariela "Mari" Pepin	Yes	Yes	Braasch and Pepin married in June 2023 on the beach during season 9. They had a second ceremony on November 11, 2023, in Puerto Rico. They live in Chicago, Illinois.
7	August 16 – October 5, 2021	Riley Christian & Maurissa Gunn	Yes	No	Christian and Gunn announced their breakup on January 24, 2022.
7	August 16 – October 5, 2021	Noah Erb & Abigail Heringer	No	Yes	Although they initially spilt during the show, it was revealed after the finale aired that Erb and Heringer had gotten back together. They got engaged on August 8, 2023, and married on October 7, 2024. They live in Tulsa, Oklahoma.
7	August 16 – October 5, 2021	Thomas Jacobs & Becca Kufrin	No	Yes	Although they initially spilt during the show, it was revealed after the finale aired that Jacobs and Kufrin had gotten back together. They got engaged in May 2022, and married on October 13, 2023. They live in San Diego, California, with their sons, Benson (born September 21, 2023) and Steven (born April 5, 2026).
7	August 16 – October 5, 2021	Brendan Morais & Pieper James	No	No	Morais and James quit the show as a couple in week 3. They broke up in September 2023. In 2024, Morais began dating Season 8's Serene Russell.
7	August 16 – October 5, 2021	Chris Conran & Alana Milne	No	Yes	Although Conran and Milne quit separately week 3, they revealed they started dating after Paradise. They married on July 18, 2025 in Laguna Beach, and live in Salt Lake City, Utah with their daughter Vivienne (born June 9, 2026).
8	September 27 – November 22, 2022	Brandon Jones & Serene Russell	Yes	No	Jones and Russell announced their breakup on May 8, 2023. In 2024, Russell began dating Season 7's Brendan Morais.
8	September 27 – November 22, 2022	Johnny DePhillipo & Victoria Fuller	Yes	No	Although the season ended with DePhillipo proposing to Fuller, at the reunion it was revealed that they broke up in September 2022 after DePhillipo alleges Fuller cheated on him with Bachelorette season 17 contestant Greg Grippo.
8	September 27 – November 22, 2022	Michael Allio & Danielle Maltby	No	No	In February 2023, Maltby moved to Ohio to be with Allio and his son James. He confirmed their breakup on September 18, 2023.
8	September 27 – November 22, 2022	Tyler Norris & Brittany Galvin	No	No	Norris and Galvin left Paradise in a relationship, but at the reunion it was revealed she broke up with him over FaceTime in August 2022.
8	September 27 – November 22, 2022	Romeo Alexander & Kira Mengistu	No	No	Alexander and Mengistu left as couple in week 2. However, they announced their breakup on December 16, 2022.
9	September 28 – December 7, 2023	Aaron Bryant & Eliza Isichei	Yes	No	Bryant and Isichei announced their breakup on December 11, 2023.
9	September 28 – December 7, 2023	John Henry Spurlock & Kat Izzo	Yes	No	Spurlock and Izzo announced their breakup on December 11, 2023.
9	September 28 – December 7, 2023	Aven Jones & Kylee Russell	No	No	Jones and Russell left Paradise in a relationship, but on December 9, 2023, she announced they had broken up after she discovered he'd cheated on her multiple times. They later got back together, but broke up again in July 2024. They got back together again, but broke up for a third time in January 2026.
10	July 7, 2025 – September 2, 2025	Spencer Conley & Jess Edwards	Yes	No	Conley and Edwards announced their breakup on September 8, 2026.
10	July 7, 2025 – September 2, 2025	Andrew Spencer & Alexe Godin	No	Yes	Spencer and Godin are still together as of November 2026.
10	July 7, 2025 – September 2, 2025	Dale Moss & Kat Izzo	No	No	Moss and Izzo left Paradise in a relationship, but broke up in November 2025.
10	July 7, 2025 – September 2, 2025	Jeremy Simon & Bailey Brown	No	Yes	Simon and Brown are still together as of November 2026.

== Ratings ==
Viewership and ratings per season of Bachelor in Paradise
Season	Timeslot (ET)	Episodes	First aired		Last aired		TV season	Avg. viewers (millions)	Avg. 18–49 rating
Season	Timeslot (ET)	Episodes	Date	Viewers (millions)	Date	Viewers (millions)	TV season	Avg. viewers (millions)	Avg. 18–49 rating
1	Monday 8:00 pm	7	August 4, 2014	5.31	September 8, 2014	5.40	2013–14	5.14	1.37
2	Sunday 8:00 pm Monday 8:00 pm	12	August 2, 2015	3.60	September 7, 2015	4.82	2014–15	4.35	1.32
3	Monday 8:00 pm Tuesday 8:00 pm	11	August 2, 2016	4.63	September 6, 2016	5.57	2015–16	4.84	1.44
4	Monday 8:00 pm Tuesday 8:00 pm	9	August 14, 2017	5.09	September 11, 2017	4.70	2016–17	4.52	1.34
5	Monday 8:00 pm Tuesday 8:00 pm	11	August 7, 2018	3.82	September 11, 2018	4.55	2017–18	4.23	1.14
6	Monday 8:00 pm Tuesday 8:00 pm	13	August 5, 2019	4.36	September 17, 2019	4.38	2018–19	4.22	1.17
7	Monday 8:00 pm Tuesday 8:00 pm	11	August 16, 2021	3.23	October 5, 2021	2.91	2020–21	TBD	TBD
8	Monday 8:00 pm Tuesday 8:00 pm	16	September 27, 2022	2.60	November 22, 2022	2.62	2022–23	TBD	TBD
9	Thursday 9:00 pm	10	September 28, 2023	2.08	December 7, 2023	1.74	2023–24	TBD	TBD
10	Monday 8:00 pm	10	July 7, 2025	1.84	September 2, 2025	TBD	2024–25	TBD	TBD

== International versions ==
Bachelor in Paradise Australia was commissioned by Network Ten in late 2017. In Germany premiered on May 9, 2018, on RTL. Bachelor in Paradise Canada premiered on October 10, 2021, on Citytv. Pro TV announced in May 2026 that it had acquired the rights for a Romanian adaptation titled Burlacii: Foc în Paradis.

== See also ==
- Ex on the Beach
- Paradise Hotel
