= Juan Pablo Galavis =

Soccer player and TV personality (born 1981)

Personal information
- Full name: Juan Pablo Galavís Guinand
- Date of birth: August 5, 1981 (age 45)
- Place of birth: Ithaca, New York, United States
- Height: 5 ft 11 in (1.80 m)
- Position: Midfielder

College career
| Years | Team | Apps | (Gls) |
| 1998–2001 | Roberts Wesleyan Redhawks | | |

Senior career*
| Years | Team | Apps | (Gls) |
| 2001 | Cascade Surge | ? | (?) |
| 2002–2003 | Caracas FC B | ? | (2) |
| 2003–2004 | Marítimo | 16 | (4) |
| 2004–2005 | Caracas Fútbol Club/Italchacao | 14 | (4) |
| 2005–2006 | Monagas | 22 | (4) |
| 2007 | Aragua | 7 | (0) |
| 2007–2008 | Guaros FC | 10 | (2) |
| 2008 | Miami FC | 23 | (2) |
- * Club domestic league appearances and goals

Juan Pablo Galavis Guinand (Spanish: [xwam ˈpaβlo ɣalaˈβis]; born August 5, 1981) is an American-born Venezuelan television personality and former professional soccer player. In 2013, he was chosen as the first Latino star of the ABC-TV reality show The Bachelor after 17 editions.

== Early life and football career ==
Galavis was born in Ithaca, New York, to Venezuelan parents Saul Galavis and Nelly Guinand and is the second of three siblings; he moved with his family to Barquisimeto, Venezuela, when he was 2 years old.

He returned to the United States to play soccer at Roberts Wesleyan College, where as of 2006 he was tied with two others for that team's third-highest number of assists (25). After several seasons playing as a midfielder in the Primera División Venezolana with Dep. Italchacao, Monagas SC, Aragua FC and Guaros FC, he joined Miami FC in February 2008.

== Entertainment career ==
He left football after his 2008 season with Miami and began his career in the music business with promotional work in the Miami bar and club scene. Around this time, he also began working with Venezuelan musician/songwriters Frank Santofimio and Mario Donoso. They began promoting Venezuelan duet Chino y Nacho.

Galavis began filming television commercials and had a short stint working as a television presenter for a Miami-based sports show, Mega TV's Mega News.

Galavís appeared as a contestant on the ABC reality-television dating competition The Bachelorette in May 2013, but was eliminated midway in the season. On August 5, 2013, ABC announced he would star in season 18 of The Bachelor, scheduled to premiere in January 2014. As a Latino, he was the first person from an ethnic minority to be chosen as a Bachelor after 17 previous editions.

== Personal life ==
Galavis and his former girlfriend, Venezuelan actress Carla Rodríguez, have a daughter named Camila, born in 2009; His daughter competed in season 22 of American Idol. He chose Nikki Ferrell on season 18 of The Bachelor, but the two ended their relationship in October 2014. In 2016, he began dating Venezuelan model and TV host Osmariel Villalobos. On August 7, 2017, it was announced that the two had married. In 2019, they divorced.

| Preceded by Sean Lowe | The Bachelor; Season 18 | Succeeded by Chris Soules |
