= Hannah Godwin =

American television personality (born 1995)

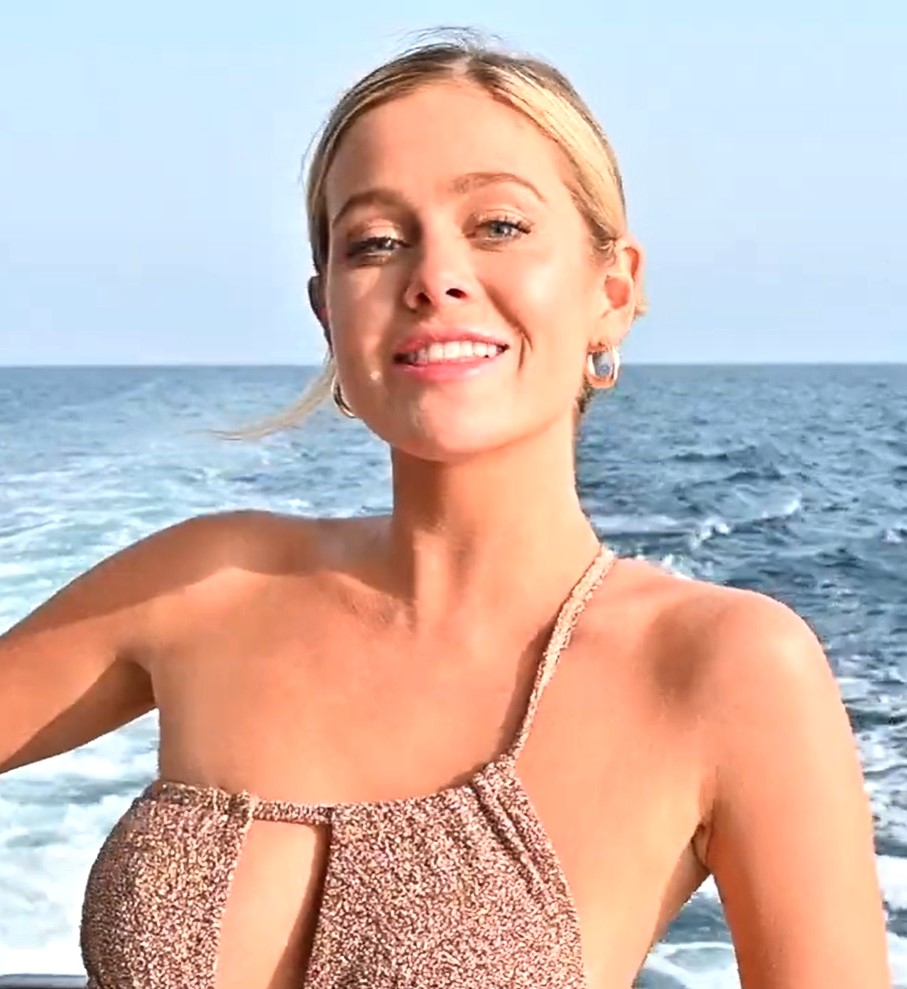
- Godwin in 2019
- Born: February 4, 1995 (age 31); Alabama, US
- Education: University of Montevallo
- Occupation: Television personality
- Spouse: Dylan Barbour (m. 2023)

Hannah Godwin (born February 4, 1995) is an American television personality. She appeared on season 23 of The Bachelor, where she received the first impression rose and was one of three remaining finalists, and season 6 of Bachelor in Paradise, where she got engaged to Dylan Barbour.

== Early life ==
Godwin was born on February 4, 1995, and grew up in Birmingham, Alabama. She attended Hoover High School, where she competed in Miss Senior Class 2013. She won Miss Oak Mountain and was a contestant in three Miss Alabama USA pageants, in which she placed 3rd runner-up in 2015 and 2016 and finished 1st runner-up in 2017 to Baylee Smith. In 2017, she also competed against Hannah Brown – who later appeared on season 23 of The Bachelor alongside Godwin – and won the title of Miss Congeniality.

She graduated from the University of Montevallo in 2017 with a degree in business, management, marketing, and related support services, although she initially attended college to study photography. After graduating, Godwin worked in social media and marketing for clothing brands and has become an influencer. She appeared at Birmingham Fashion Week and following that experience, she became a model for Soca Clothing and Show Me Your Mumu.

== Reality television career ==
Godwin was a contestant on season 23 of The Bachelor, starring Colton Underwood. She received the first impression rose from Underwood. She was one of two remaining finalists (with Tayshia Adams) when Underwood decided to call off the show to pursue Cassie Randolph, who had quit the show. After the conclusion of season 23 of The Bachelor, Godwin became a contestant on season 6 of Bachelor in Paradise, where she began a relationship with Dylan Barbour, getting engaged during the season finale in September 2019.

Godwin is also a YouTube vlogger and TikTok personality.

== Personal life ==
After getting engaged in the finale of Bachelor in Paradise, Godwin and Barbour began a long-distance relationship between San Diego and Los Angeles. The couple celebrated their engagement in February 2020 in Hollywood Hills with family and fellow Bachelor alumni such as Peter Weber, Hannah Brown, Mike Johnson, Luke Stone, Heather Martin, Demi Burnett, Katie Morton, Matt Donald, and Jed Wyatt. In October 2020, Godwin announced on her Instagram, hannahg11, that she had bought a house with Barbour in San Diego. They married on August 23, 2023, in Paris.
