= Hannah Brown =

American model and television personality

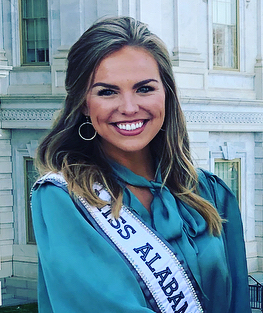
- Brown in 2018
- Born: Hannah Kelsey Brown; September 24, 1994 (age 32); Tuscaloosa, Alabama, U.S.
- Education: University of Alabama
- Occupations: Media personality, beauty pageant titleholder, author
- Height: 5 ft 7 in (1.70 m)
- Spouse: Adam Woolard (m. 2025)
- Beauty pageant titleholder
- Title: Miss Alabama USA 2018
- Hair color: Blonde
- Eye color: Green
- Major competitions: Miss Alabama USA 2018 (Winner); Miss USA 2018 (Unplaced)

Hannah Kelsey Brown (born September 24, 1994) is an American television personality, author, and beauty pageant titleholder. She first gained recognition as a top-seven contestant on season 23 of The Bachelor and was subsequently cast as the lead of season 15 of The Bachelorette. Brown then competed on season 28 of Dancing with the Stars with professional partner Alan Bersten, winning the competition on November 25, 2019.

== Early life and education ==
Brown was born in Tuscaloosa, Alabama to parents Robert Walker Brown and Susanne Brown. She was raised both in Tuscaloosa and in nearby Northport, Alabama. She graduated from Tuscaloosa County High School, and later from the University of Alabama in 2017, receiving a degree magna cum laude from the university's College of Communication and Information Sciences. In college, she was a member of the Alpha Upsilon chapter of the Alpha Chi Omega sorority. Brown then worked as an interior designer in Northport.

== Career ==
=== 2009–2018: Pageantry ===
Brown began her pageantry career at age 15, competing in local Alabama teen pageants. As a teenager, she had placed first runner-up in Miss Alabama's Outstanding Teen 2010 and second runner-up in Miss Alabama Teen USA 2011. Brown later competed in Miss Alabama 2013, representing Tuscaloosa, however she did not place in the competition. After a brief hiatus from pageantry, Brown returned to compete in Miss Alabama USA 2017, but did not place in the competition. She returned the following year, representing West Alabama, and was crowned Miss Alabama USA 2018.

As Miss Alabama USA 2018, Brown was given the opportunity to represent Alabama at the Miss USA 2018 competition, held in Shreveport, Louisiana. While at Miss USA, Brown was roommates with future The Bachelor castmate Caelynn Miller-Keyes, who had been crowned Miss North Carolina USA 2018. For the pageant, Brown adopted a platform of mental health awareness, as she had previously suffered from anxiety and depression which caused her to leave pageantry for several years. Brown ultimately did not place in the competition and the pageant was won by Sarah Rose Summers of Nebraska. She resumed her reign after filming of The Bachelor had completed and crowned Hannah McMurphy as her successor in November 2018.

=== 2018–2020: The Bachelor, The Bachelorette and Dancing with the Stars ===
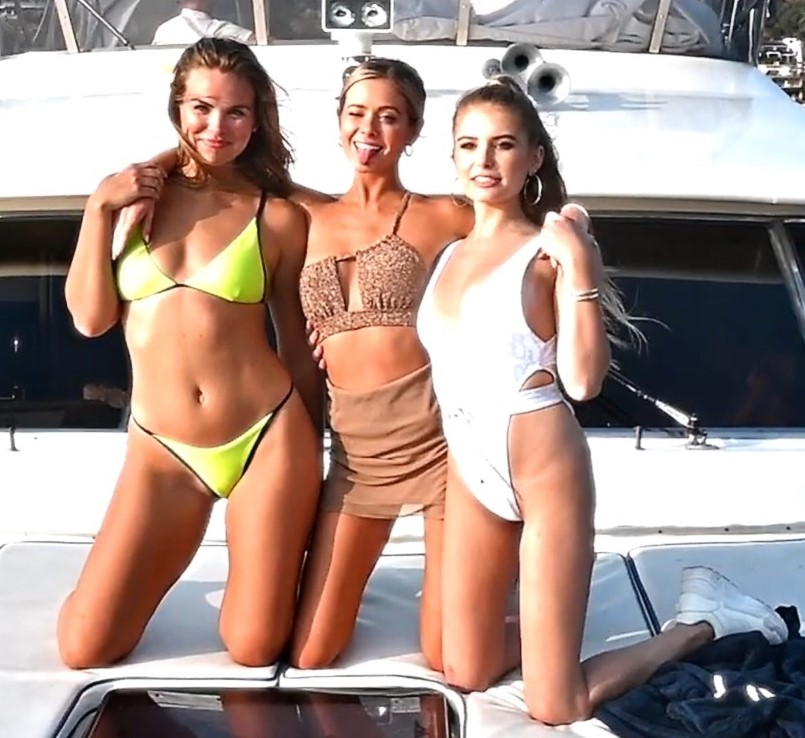
L to R: The Bachelor season 23 contestants Brown, Hannah Godwin, Demi Burnett, celebrate Brown's birthday in 2019

In 2018, Brown was cast in season 23 of The Bachelor, starring former professional football player Colton Underwood. Filming for the season took place throughout fall 2018, and Brown was later revealed by ABC to be a contestant on December 6, 2018. Brown went on to place seventh in the competition, being eliminated by Underwood during the episode airing February 18, 2019, and filmed in Denver, Colorado. During the second part of the season finale, aired on March 12, 2019, Brown was announced by host Chris Harrison as the lead for the upcoming fifteenth season of The Bachelorette. Brown is the first Bachelorette cast to not have placed in the top four of a season of The Bachelor.

In the season finale of The Bachelorette, Brown chose Jed Wyatt as her fiancé, although they later broke up after filming after it emerged through People that Wyatt had been in a relationship with another woman prior to and during his stint on the show. Brown later asked runner-up Tyler Cameron out on a date during the finale, although their relationship did not progress. On November 10, 2019, Brown won "The Competition Contestant of 2019" at the 45th People's Choice Awards for her time as lead on The Bachelorette.

In August 2019, Brown was announced as one of the celebrities to compete on season 28 of Dancing with the Stars. Her appearance makes her the second woman in the show's history to participate from The Bachelorette, following Trista Sutter in the first season. She was partnered with professional dancer Alan Bersten during her tenure on the show. In the finale, which aired on November 25, Brown and Bersten were announced as the winners.

==== Dancing with the Stars (season 28 performances) ====
Week #	Dance / Song	Judges' score			Result
Week #	Dance / Song	Inaba	Goodman	Tonioli	Result
1	Cha-cha-cha / "I Wanna Dance with Somebody (Who Loves Me)"	7	7	6	No elimination
2	Viennese waltz / "Lover"	8	8	8	Safe
3	Rumba / "Hold On"	7	7	7	Safe
4	Paso doble / "I Love It"	8	8^{1}/8	8	Safe
5	Foxtrot / "A Whole New World"	9	8	9	No elimination
6	Samba / "Southbound"	8	7	8	Safe
7	Jazz / "Bad Girls"; Team Freestyle / "Somebody's Watching Me"	8; 9	9; 9	8; 9	Safe
8	Quickstep / "American Girl"; Salsa Dance-Off / "Rhythm Is Gonna Get You"	10; Awarded	9; 2	10; Points	Safe
9	Salsa / "No Scrubs"; Tango / "Boy with Luv"	8; 10	8/8^{2} 9/10^{2}	8; 10	Safe
10 (Semifinals)	Rumba / "Dancing with a Stranger"; Contemporary / "Lose You to Love Me"	9; 9	9; 9	9; 9	Safe
11 (Finals)	Viennese waltz / "Lover"; Freestyle / "Girl on Fire" & "Hollaback Girl"	10; 10	9; 10	9; 10	WINNER

^{1} Score given by guest judge Leah Remini.

^{2} Score given by guest judge Joey Fatone.

=== 2021–present: Books ===
On November 11, 2021, her memoir titled God Bless This Mess: Learning to Live and Love Through Life's Best (and Worst) Moments was published by HarperCollins. The book debuted at number 13 on The New York Times best seller list in the Hardcover Nonfiction section.

She released "a companion journal" to her memoir called God Bless This Messy Journal: A Guide to Embracing the Beautiful, Messy You, published on April 12, 2022. It included quotes, photos, excerpts from Brown's personal journals, Bible verses and lyrics.

In 2023, Brown appeared on the first season of Fox's quasi-military training series Special Forces: World's Toughest Test. She was one of two contestants, alongside Carli Lloyd, to survive all 10 days of selection and was also the last non-athlete standing.

In September 2023, Variety reported that Brown signed a two-book deal with Grand Central Publishing's imprint Forever. Brown's first romance novel written with Emily Larrabee, Mistakes We Never Made was published on May 7, 2024 and her second book scheduled for summer 2025. Mistakes We Never Made follows the story of interior designer Emma Townsend, who embarks on a road trip with her childhood crush. Brown described the book and main character Emma by saying: "Emma is not fully me, but she is a part of me. There's a core group of best friends in this book, and that's really where it all started for me. I think some of the best love stories in our life can be those that we have with our friends. And that's a real big foundation in this book that I hope that people really can see." The book debuted at number 15 on The New York Times Best Seller list on May 26, 2024.

== Personal life ==
Brown began dating Adam Woolard in early 2021. They got engaged in August 2023. They were legally married on June 21, 2025, in Tennessee, followed by a ceremonial wedding on July 26, 2025, in France.

On May 16, 2020, Brown sang the lyrics of "Rockstar", a song by rapper DaBaby that included a racial slur, on Instagram Live. She was criticized by numerous media outlets, as well as other well-known cast members of The Bachelor, including former Bachelorette Rachel Lindsay. After initially denying that she used the slur, Brown issued a written apology on Instagram the next day promising "to do better". Two weeks later, she made another, much longer apology on Instagram that was well received.

== Filmography ==
Television
Year	Title	Role	Notes
2018	Miss USA 2018	Herself	Television special; Miss Alabama USA; unplaced
2019–2020	The Bachelor	Herself	Contestant; season 23; seventh place Guest appearance; season 24
2019	The Bachelorette	Herself	The Bachelorette; season 15
2019, 2023, 2025	Bachelor in Paradise	Herself	Guest appearance; season 6 and season 9 and season 10
2019, 2023	Dancing with the Stars	Herself	Contestant and winner; season 28 Guest performer; season 32
2021	The Celebrity Dating Game	Herself	Mystery Celebrity
2023	Special Forces: World's Toughest Test	Herself	Contestant and winner on season 1; 10 episodes

Music videos
Year	Title	Artist	Role
2021	"Almost Maybes"	Jordan Davis	Love interest

== Awards and nominations ==
Year	Award	Category	Nominated work	Result	Ref.
2019	People's Choice Awards	The Competition Contestant of 2019	The Bachelorette	Won	

== Published works ==
- Brown, Hannah. God Bless This Mess: Learning to Live and Love Through Life's Best (and Worst) Moment (November 11, 2021). HarperCollins.
- Brown, Hannah; Larrabee, Emily. Mistakes We Never Made (May 7, 2024). Forever.

Awards and achievements
Preceded by Baylee Smith	Miss Alabama USA; 2018	Succeeded by Hannah McMurphy
Preceded by Becca Kufrin	The Bachelorette; Season 15	Succeeded by Clare Crawley
