= The Bachelor (American TV series) season 22 =

Season of television series

The Bachelor
- Season 22
- Promotional poster
- Starring: Arie Luyendyk Jr.
- Presented by: Chris Harrison
- No. of contestants: 29
- Winner: Becca Kufrin
- Runner-up: Lauren Burnham
- No. of episodes: 12 (including 2 specials)

Release
- Original network: ABC
- Original release: January 1 – March 6, 2018

Additional information
- Filming dates: September 20 – November 17, 2017

Season chronology
- ← Previous; Season 21 Next → Season 23

The twenty-second season of The Bachelor premiered on January 1, 2018. This season features 36-year-old Arie Luyendyk Jr., a real estate agent and race car driver from Scottsdale, Arizona. Luyendyk was the runner-up on the eighth season of The Bachelorette featuring Emily Maynard.

The season concluded on March 5, 2018, with Luyendyk choosing to propose to 27-year-old publicist Becca Kufrin. However, Luyendyk subsequently ended his engagement with Kufrin and admitted that he was still in love with runner-up Lauren Burnham, and he proposed to Burnham on the live After the Final Rose special. They married in January 2019, and are currently living in Phoenix, Arizona with their four children (Alessi, Lux, Senna, and Livvy).

== Production ==
=== Casting and contestants ===
On September 7, 2017, during Good Morning America, Luyendyk was announced as the next Bachelor over The Bachelorette season 13 runner-up Peter Kraus, who was the fan favorite choice for the role.

Notable contestants include Miss Massachusetts USA 2014 and Miss USA 2014 competitor Caroline Lunny, and Miami Dolphins Cheerleader Bibiana Julian.

=== Filming and development ===
This season traveled to Lake Tahoe; Fort Lauderdale, Florida; Paris, France; Tuscany, Italy and Peru. Appearances for this season included racing driver Robby Gordon, Gorgeous Ladies of Wrestling wrestlers Ursula Hayden and Angelina Altishin, wrestler and The Bachelorette contestant Kenny King, singer/songwriter Connor Duermit, country band Lanco, indie singer and songwriter Tenille Arts and French singer Pauline Paris.

== Contestants ==
This season began with 29 contestants.

Name	Age	Hometown	Occupation	Outcome	Place	Ref
Becca Kufrin	27	Prior Lake, Minnesota	Publicist	Winner	1	
Lauren Burnham	25	Virginia Beach, Virginia	Technology Salesperson	Runner-up	2	
Kendall Long	26	Santa Clarita, California	Creative Director	Week 9	3	
Tia Booth	26	Weiner, Arkansas	Physical Therapist	Week 8	4	
Bekah Martinez	22	Clovis, California	Nanny	Week 7	5	
Seinne Fleming	27	Long Beach, California	Commercial Real Estate Agent	Week 7	6	
Jacqueline Trumbull	26	Morgantown, West Virginia	Research Coordinator	Week 7	7 (quit)	
Chelsea Roy	29	South Portland, Maine	Real Estate Executive Assistant	Week 6	8–9	
Jenna Cooper	28	Upland, Indiana	Social Media Manager	Week 6	8–9	
Krystal Nielson	29	Missoula, Montana	Fitness Coach	Week 6	10	
Ashley Luebke	25	West Palm Beach, Florida	Real Estate Agent	Week 5	11–13	
Maquel Cooper	23	American Fork, Utah	Photographer	Week 5	11–13	
Marikh Mathias	27	Salt Lake City, Utah	Restaurant Owner	Week 5	11–13	
Brittany Taylor	30	Belton, South Carolina	Tech Recruiter	Week 4	14–15	
Caroline Lunny	26	Holliston, Massachusetts	Realtor	Week 4	14–15	
Maquel Cooper	(Returned to competition)			Week 4	(Note: Early in week 4, Maquel voluntarily left from the competition due to the death of her grandfather. She returned to the competition in the following episode.)	
Bibiana Julian	30	Miami, Florida	Executive Assistant	Week 3	16	
Annaliese Puccini	32	San Mateo, California	Event Designer	Week 3	17	
Lauren Schleyer	31	Dallas, Texas	Social Media Manager	Week 3	18	
Jennifer "Jenny" Delaney	25	Northbrook, Illinois	Graphic Designer	Week 2	19–21	
Lauren Griffin	26	Indianapolis, Indiana	Executive Recruiter	Week 2	19–21	
Valerie Biles	26	Nashville, Tennessee	Server	Week 2	19–21	
Alison "Ali" Harrington	27	Lawton, Oklahoma	Personal Stylist	Week 1	22–29	
Amber Wilkerson	29	Denver, Colorado	Business Owner	Week 1	22–29	
Brianna "Bri" Amaranthus	25	Grants Pass, Oregon	Sports Reporter	Week 1	22–29	
Brittane Johnson	27	San Diego, California	Marketing Manager	Week 1	22–29	
Jessica Carroll	26	Calgary, Alberta	Television Host	Week 1	22–29	
Lauren Jarreau	33	New Roads, Louisiana	Recent Master's Graduate	Week 1	22–29	
D'Nysha "Nysha" Norris	30	Anderson, South Carolina	Orthopedic Nurse	Week 1	22–29	
Olivia Goethals	23	Geneseo, Illinois	Marketing Associate	Week 1	22–29	

=== Future appearances ===
==== The Bachelorette ====
Becca Kufrin was chosen as the lead of season 14 of The Bachelorette, while Tia Booth, Seinne Fleming, Kendall Long, Caroline Lunny and Bekah Martinez made appearances in two episodes as well.

==== Bachelor in Paradise ====
Season 5

Bibiana Julian returned for the fifth season of Bachelor in Paradise, along with Annaliese Puccini, Chelsea Roy, Kendall, Krystal Nielson, Nysha Norris, Tia, Jenna Cooper, Caroline, Jacqueline Trumbull, and Olivia Goethals. Bibiana, Caroline, Nysha, and Jacqueline were eliminated in week 2. Chelsea was eliminated in week 4. Tia split from Colton Underwood, in week 4. Kendall split from Joe Amabile in week 5 but, reunited with him outside of Paradise. Olivia split from John Graham in week 6. Annaliese left Paradise in a relationship with Kamil Nicalek, while Jenna and Krystal ended the season engaged to Jordan Kimball and Chris Randone, respectively.

Season 6

Annaliese and Bibiana returned for the sixth season of Bachelor in Paradise. Both were eliminated in week 1.

Season 7

Kendall and Tia returned for season 7 alongside Becca. Kendall quit in week 4. Becca split from Thomas Jacobs in week 6, although they later got back together. Tia split from Aaron Clancy in week 6.

==== Bachelor in Paradise Australia ====
Season 2

Caroline appeared in the second season of Bachelor in Paradise Australia. She left the show in week 7 to pursue a relationship with fellow US contestant, Alex Bordyukov, who was also competing on that season. However, the pair are no longer together.

==== The Bachelor Winter Games ====
Bibiana and Lauren Griffin returned for The Bachelor Winter Games under Team USA. Lauren was eliminated in week 1. Bibiana quit in week 4.

==== The Traitors ====
Arie participated in season 1 of The Traitors.

== Call-out order ==
Order	Bachelorettes	Week									
Order	Bachelorettes	1	2	3	4	5	6	7	8	9	10
1	Caroline	Chelsea	Becca K.	Bekah M.	Seinne	Chelsea	Lauren B.	Becca K.	Becca K.	Lauren B.	Becca K.
2	Chelsea	Becca K.	Krystal	Chelsea	Tia	Lauren B.	Bekah M.	Lauren B.	Lauren B.	Becca K.	Lauren B.
3	Kendall	Marikh	Seinne	Caroline	Bekah M.	Tia	Kendall	Kendall	Kendall	Kendall	
4	Seinne	Kendall	Maquel	Kendall	Lauren B.	Bekah M.	Jacqueline	Tia	Tia		
5	Tia	Lauren G.	Jacqueline	Ashley	Kendall	Seinne	Tia	Bekah M.			
6	Bibiana	Krystal	Bekah M.	Lauren B.	Ashley	Kendall	Seinne	Seinne			
7	Bri	Bekah M.	Jenna	Brittany T.	Becca K.	Becca K.	Becca K.	Jacqueline			
8	Jenny	Lauren S.	Chelsea	Becca K.	Chelsea	Jacqueline	Chelsea; Jenna				
9	Brittane J.	Seinne	Lauren S.	Seinne	Jenna	Jenna	Chelsea; Jenna				
10	Jacqueline	Caroline	Tia	Krystal	Jacqueline	Krystal	Krystal				
11	Krystal	Brittany T.	Annaliese	Tia	Marikh	Ashley; Maquel; Marikh					
12	Nysha	Bibiana	Lauren B.	Maquel	Krystal	Ashley; Maquel; Marikh					
13	Valerie	Annaliese	Kendall	Jenna	Brittany T. Caroline	Ashley; Maquel; Marikh					
14	Bekah M.	Jenna	Brittany T.	Jacqueline	Brittany T. Caroline						
15	Jenna	Valerie	Ashley	Marikh	Maquel						
16	Jessica	Jacqueline	Marikh	Bibiana							
17	Marikh	Jenny	Caroline	Annaliese							
18	Olivia	Lauren B.	Bibiana	Lauren S.							
19	Becca K.	Ashley	Jenny; Lauren G. Valerie								
20	Lauren S.	Tia	Jenny; Lauren G. Valerie								
21	Lauren J.	Maquel	Jenny; Lauren G. Valerie								
22	Lauren B.	Ali; Amber; Bri; Brittane J. Jessica; Lauren J. Nysha; Olivia									
23	Lauren G.	Ali; Amber; Bri; Brittane J. Jessica; Lauren J. Nysha; Olivia									
24	Ashley	Ali; Amber; Bri; Brittane J. Jessica; Lauren J. Nysha; Olivia									
25	Brittany T.	Ali; Amber; Bri; Brittane J. Jessica; Lauren J. Nysha; Olivia									
26	Amber	Ali; Amber; Bri; Brittane J. Jessica; Lauren J. Nysha; Olivia									
27	Ali	Ali; Amber; Bri; Brittane J. Jessica; Lauren J. Nysha; Olivia									
28	Annaliese	Ali; Amber; Bri; Brittane J. Jessica; Lauren J. Nysha; Olivia									
29	Maquel	Ali; Amber; Bri; Brittane J. Jessica; Lauren J. Nysha; Olivia									

The contestant received the first impression rose
The contestant received a rose during the date
The contestant was eliminated
The contestant was eliminated during the date
The contestant was eliminated outside the rose ceremony
The contestant quit the competition
The contestant won the competition

== Episodes ==
No. overall	No. in season	Title	Original release date	Prod. code	U.S. viewers (millions)	Rating/share (18–49)
216	1	"Week 1: Season Premiere"	January 1, 2018	2201	5.48	1.5/5
This season begins with Arie arrived at the rental bachelor pad home for the tenure of the season, he is then greeted by his friend and season seventeen Bachelor Sean Lowe, his wife Catherine and their son Samuel. Sean offers his advice on being the bachelor and Catherine provides parenting tips. The competition commences later in the night as Arie greets the women as they arrive at the mansion. Tia holds a little wiener to represent the small town she hails from; Bri, a sports reporter, tosses Arie a catch; Valerie gives a ballroom dance; Bekah M. rides a 1965 Ford Mustang up to the mansion; Jessica recognizes Arie as her father met him a few years ago; Becca K. holds a black velvet ring box to give Arie a proposal; Annaliese wears a mask to recall Arie's nickname "kissing bandit" and Maquel rides an IndyCar race car, to dismay from the other girls. Once all the women are in the mansion, Arie and Brittany T. ride miniature cars outside the mansion, Kendall sings a song while playing her ukulele, Caroline brings a box of pizza to eat a slice, Jenna gives Arie a foot massage. In the end, Arie selects Chelsea to receive the first impression rose. At the rose ceremony, Ali, Amber, Bri, Brittane J., Jessica, Lauren J., Nysha and Olivia are sent home.
217	2	"Week 2"	January 8, 2018	2202	5.56	1.4/5
Becca K. gets the first one-on-one date of the season. She gets to ride a motorcycle with Arie and they travel to his home for a tour. There, they get a surprise visit from Rachel Zoe and Becca receives a set of clothes and Louboutin heels, plus the gift of a necklace and two pairs of earrings. Arie and Becca discuss her painful past and Arie gives her a rose. Krystal also gets a one-on-one date with Arie and they fly to his hometown of Scottsdale, Arizona for a tour of his alma mater at Desert Mountain High School where Arie attended. They stop by his parents' house where Krystal meets Arie's parents, including former race car driver Arie Luyendyk, his younger brother and his sister-in-law. They arrive back in Los Angeles and visit the Bradbury Building where Krystal shares some of her backstory with Arie. In the end, Arie gives her a rose and they are given a private concert by Connor Duermit inside the Los Angeles Theatre. Maquel, Marikh, Tia, Valerie, Annaliese, Lauren G, Kendall, Bekah, Jenny, Seinne, Jenna, Caroline, Brittany T., Bibiana and Chelsea take part in the first group date of the season: a demolition derby race. Annaliese had a traumatic injury on a bumping car as a child, which influences her ability to enjoy the date. Chris Harrison and race car driver Robby Gordon present the event. Seinne emerges victorious and is declared the winner. After the derby event, Arie informs the girls that Brittany T. has been sent to hospital due to minor injuries. Bibiana starts a dramatic argument with the other ladies and threatens to leave. Seinne ends up with the group date rose. At the cocktail party, Brittany receives the "Most Hardcore" certificate award. Bibiana's drama continues when she interrupts Lauren B. and Krystal as they compete to spend time one-on-one with Arie. In the rose ceremony, Jenny, Lauren G. and Valerie are eliminated.
218	3	"Week 3"	January 15, 2018	2203	6.61	1.8/6
Maquel, Jacqueline, Lauren B., Tia, Marikh, Bekah M., Bibiana and Krystal go on a group date to take part in a wrestling event, dubbing themselves the "Gorgeous Ladies of Bachelor". Angelina Altishin and Ursula Hayden of Gorgeous Ladies of Wrestling train them. Tia and Bibiana feel overwhelmed by the training and Arie comforts Tia. They divide into four teams of two. Arie opens the event by wrestling with professional wrestler and former The Bachelorette contestant Kenny King. They spend the night at Caravan Outpost in Ojai. Bibiana discusses Krystal's irritating behavior with Arie. Bekah M. gets the group date rose, despite Krystal thinking she has the strongest connection with him. Lauren S. gets the one-on-one date of the week. Arie meets her and they fly to Napa Valley. They spend time inside the winery, but Arie decides they lack romantic chemistry and Lauren S. is sent home. Ashley, Becca K., Brittany, Jenna, Caroline, Chelsea and Annaliese take part in a group date at a park, where Arie introduces them to his dog, Bastian. The women play with dogs and train them to perform tricks for a show. Annaliese had several traumatic instances with dogs in her childhood, which causes her to be nervous. The women have to perform the show at The Grove. Chris Harrison and Fred Willard present the event, which they call "Arie's Amazing Acrodogs". Chelsea gets the group date rose. At the cocktail party, Bibiana sets up a daybed outdoors with a telescope, though Lauren B. was the first one to discover the place before Bibiana claimed the spot. Tia presents moonshine to Arie. Annaliese and Arie decide they do not have mutual attraction or a future connection and she is eliminated before the ceremony. At the rose ceremony, Bibiana is eliminated.
219	4	"Week 4: Lake Tahoe"	January 22, 2018	2204	6.38	1.8/6
Chris Harrison tells the ladies they are traveling to South Lake Tahoe, California to meet up with Arie. Seinne gets the one-on-one date and they take a thrilling parasailing ride on a boat over Lake Tahoe. They dine at Hard Rock Lake Tahoe in Stateline, Nevada and share their stories with each other. Arie gives her a rose, they enjoy a private concert with Lanco inside. At the hotel, Maquel receives a call from her mother and learns that her grandfather has died. She subsequently leaves the competition. Chelsea, Krystal, Becca, Marikh, Ashley, Jacqueline, Jenna, Tia, Kendall, Lauren B., Brittany and Caroline chosen for a group date head into the wilderness where they meet survival experts Mykel and Ruth Hawke. The women learn three survival skills: drinking urine from a thermos, eating worms and bugs and exploring the vast wilderness with a provided map divided between three teams of four. Krystal recalls when she attended a camp. Tia ends up receiving the date rose. Bekah M. gets the second one-on-one date and she and Arie take a horseback ride through the foothills of Lake Tahoe until they reach a bathtub. Bekah finally reveals to Arie that she is 22. In the end, Arie gives Bekah the rose. Chris shows up at the hotel and announces that the cocktail party is cancelled. At the rose ceremony, Krystal wants to talk with Arie before the ceremony begins. In the end, Brittany and Caroline are eliminated from the competition.
220	5	"Week 5: Fort Lauderdale"	January 29, 2018	2205	6.36	1.7/6
The remaining ladies travel to Fort Lauderdale, Florida, where Maquel has returned to rejoin the competition. Chelsea gets the one-on-one date with Arie on a houseboat and riding on a jet ski. They have dinner at an antique car museum where Chelsea confides to Arie about her past relationship and her son. Arie gives her a rose and they dance to a song by Tenille Arts backstage. Maquel, Krystal, Bekah M., Becca K., Jenna, Seinne, Kendall, Ashley, Marikh, Jacqueline and Lauren B. chosen for a group date go bowling. Arie splits the women into two teams, named The Spare Roses and The Pin Ups. He reveals that the winning team will go to the after party, while the losers will go back to the hotel. The Spare Roses win the game, but after Arie changes his mind and invites both teams to the after party, Krystal begins to show her frustration. They return to the hotel where Krystal decides to skip the after party, calling Arie a liar. Arie visits Krystal in her room and confines her to the room after they talk about Krystal's hurt feelings. She later changes her mind and joins the others, who confront her separately about her hypocrisy. Lauren B. gets the group date rose. Tia has a one-on-one date at the Everglades, riding a hydro boat with Arie and stopping by an old wooden house to eat three delicacies: fried gator, corn and frog legs. After dinner, Arie hands the rose to her. The cocktail party takes place at Bonnet House where Krystal's behavior becomes more irrational, causing others to be upset. At the rose ceremony, Ashley, Maquel and Marikh are eliminated.
221	6	"Week 6: Paris, France"	February 5, 2018	2206	6.82	1.8/7
The ten ladies travel to Paris, France, to stop at U by Uniworld cruise boat on the Seine River. Chris Harrison announces there will be four dates instead of the regular three. Lauren B. gets a one-on-one date with Arie, riding a boat and sightseeing around the city including Notre-Dame de Paris. They dine together at Le Grand Véfour and reveal their backstories. Arie relates how his ex-girlfriend was pregnant but suffered a miscarriage, and Lauren tells him she was previously engaged. Arie gives her a rose. Becca K., Seinne, Bekah M., Tia, Chelsea and Jenna chosen for a group date take part in a Moulin Rouge Féerie cabaret inside the theater. They learn choreography, with Seinne demonstrating her dancing experience. Moulin Rouge artistic director Miss Janet announces the best performing lady will receive a rose to perform on stage with Arie. At the cocktail party, Arie has discussions with each of the ladies to open up their feelings, and Bekah M. receives the group date rose. She and Arie start the show for the night, while the rest of the girls sit in the audience. Kendall and Krystal get the two-on-one date and travel to Château de Breteuil in Choisel to meet with Arie. They race through a hedge maze and Krystal finds Arie first. Krystal confides in Arie that Kendall is not ready for marriage, and Kendall talks to Krystal privately about it afterwards. Arie then announces the date will continue at a building close to Eiffel Tower. Kendall receives the rose, sending Krystal home. Arie and Kendall kiss at the top of Eiffel Tower. Jacqueline gets a one-on-one date with Arie, but their car breaks down. They go into a fashion store, where Jacqueline selects a dress to wear. They have lunch at Maxim's restaurant and she receives a rose from Arie. In the rose ceremony at Musée des Arts Forains that night, Chelsea and Jenna are eliminated. Afterwards, Arie announces that the remaining ladies will be traveling to Tuscany, Italy.
222	7	"Week 7: Tuscany, Italy"	February 12, 2018 (Note: Week 7 and Week 8 were aired during the 2018 Winter Olympics.)	2207	5.94	1.5/5
The seven ladies arrive in Tuscany and stop in Pisa, where Chris Harrison announces there will be three individual dates, one group date and no rose ceremony. Becca K. gets the first one-on-one date and they drive to the town of Barga, buying bread and sharing a picnic overlooking the Tuscan view. She becomes excited about Arie meeting her family on the upcoming hometowns. Becca receives a rose. Jacqueline expresses increasing doubts and seeks out Arie to discuss her future goals about finishing her degree, ultimately deciding to quit the competition. Lauren B. has the second one-on-one to the town of Lucca with Arie, where they ride bicycles on a cobbled streets, eat gelato, and watch children playing football. They dine at Villa Grabau, when Lauren confesses her feelings to Arie, who gives her the rose. Seinne goes on the next one-on-one date, where she and Arie explore the Tuscan countryside to meet Giulio and his dogs, go hunting for truffles, and are welcomed by his family for lunch. Arie does not give a rose to Seinne, sending her home. Kendall, Bekah M. and Tia go on the last group date, meeting with Arie at Villa Reale. Tia expresses her concerns to Arie about Bekah's seriousness and youth, leaving Bekah upset and receiving consolation from Arie. Kendall receives the rose, leaving Tia and Bekah to have dinner on their continuation of the date. Tia gets the rose and Bekah is eliminated.
223	8	"Week 8: Hometowns"	February 19, 2018	2208	6.27	1.7/6
Kendall's hometown date begins in Los Angeles where she meets Arie and takes him to a taxidermy studio, showing him how to stuff rats. Then, Kendall brings Arie to meet her family. Kendall's twin sister Kylie voices her concern to Arie about relationship issues; the sisters have been talking face-to-face. Tia takes Arie to her hometown Weiner, Arkansas, traveling to Crowley's Ridge Raceway near Paragould to experience car racing. Arie drifts first to take the lead. When Arie meets Tia's family, her overprotective father talks to Arie about his playboy reputation. The next stop is at Minneapolis, Minnesota to visit Becca, where she and Arie visit Minnetonka Orchards to harvest apples and take slingshots, then later make caramelized apples to eat. Later that day, Arie meets Becca's family in Prior Lake for a family dinner. Becca's uncle shares his story to Arie, that Becca's dad died and her mom is in remission from breast cancer. Finally, Arie travels to Virginia Beach, Virginia to meet with Lauren where they ride horses on a beach, go up the lighthouse and stroll on the pier. She introduces Arie to her family, Arie suffers an anxiety attack before dinner has started. He tells Lauren's father that he previously traveled to Iraq to visit the Armed Forces on a goodwill tour. At the rose ceremony, Arie takes Kendall aside and asks if she feels ready to be engaged. In the end, Tia is eliminated, leaving her crying and heartbroken.
224	9	"The Women Tell All"	February 25, 2018	N/A	4.26	1.1/4
Eighteen eliminated contestants sit down to face the audience. Chris Harrison interviews Krystal about her harsh irrational attitude and hypocritical behavior. The ladies question her about lying on the bowling date in Fort Lauderdale, but Krystal defends herself instead of offering an apology. She reveals that she lost her voice throughout the season, and that her brother is currently recovering from homelessness. Seinne is first on the hot seat and how she recalls memories from her date with Arie in Tuscany and says that she is still single. Bekah M. expresses frustrations over assumptions about her age and addresses Tia about her previous remarks. Chris shows a missing persons notice for her, and Bekah explains she went to work a marijuana farm weeks after completed filming, but did not have reception for days causing her mother to report her missing, Chris calls her mother on his cellphone, and suggests that her daughter may be absent for a few weeks to make an appearance on Bachelor in Paradise. Tia talks about feeling blindsided and Chris asks her if she wants to have another chance for love. Arie joins Chris onstage. Caroline calls out Arie, saying "I know what you did. I don't know how you could do that" with no further explanation given. Then, Arie reunites with Krystal and gives an apology for what happened on the two-on-one date in Paris. Before the special ends, bloopers and a sneak peek of Blockers are shown.
225	10	"Week 9: Fantasy Suites"	February 26, 2018	2209	6.57	1.8/7
The three ladies head to Ica, Peru for overnight dates. Kendall takes a dune buggy in Paracas where she ends up sandboarding to the bottom after the buggy gets stuck on a steep point and sets up a picnic in the desert. Lauren takes a plane ride over the Nazca Lines seeing aerial views of ancient large scale geoglyphs on the ground below. She talks with Arie about relationship issues, stating her fears of another heartbreak. Becca takes a catamaran ride to a picturesque view of Ballestas Islands and sees the seals there. All three ladies get the fantasy suites, and Arie receives a blessing from each lady the following morning after the overnight date. The next day, Becca's ex-boyfriend Ross shows up and talks to Arie, saying that he is desperate to have Becca back and win her heart. Ross goes to Becca's hotel room asking for a marriage proposal and she says no. At the rose ceremony, Arie called Kendall and they talk once again, as she is not really ready for marriage without chemistry and physical attraction. Arie sends her home before the ceremony.
226	11	"Week 10: Season Finale"	March 5, 2018	2210	7.94	2.2/8
Lauren and Becca have an opportunity to meet with Arie's family in a hotel in Cusco. Both ladies have doubts after hearing a conversation with Arie's parents, with Arie saying he loves both women. Lauren's final date involves riding in a private train from Sacred Valley, she and Arie end at Machu Picchu with a view nearby. Lauren reveals that she met Arie before the show while she was living in Dallas. Becca's final date involves a plaza in Downtown Cusco, where Arie holds an umbrella waiting for her. They go into a marketplace trying to fit traditional poncho dress. They share their story how they first met, reading on a memory book about their potential future together including getting married and having children. At the rose ceremony, Lauren is feeling excited to receive a proposal, but Arie tells her something is stopping him and she is sent home in tears. When Becca arrives, they profess their love and Arie kneels and proposes to her. Becca accepts. Weeks after filming wrapped up, Becca arrives at the safe house in Los Angeles just as Arie is arriving. He immediately announces he wants to call off the engagement. They speak in private and he tells Becca he is more in love with Lauren than her. Arie's goal is to reconcile with Lauren and he reveals to Becca that he spoke to Lauren on New Year's Day. Becca feels frustrated, confused, angry and heartbroken, sobbing on the bathroom floor. She finally asks Arie to leave the house, which he eventually does. In a live interview, Becca reveals that she hasn't spoken to Arie since that day.
227	12	"After the Final Rose"	March 6, 2018	N/A	7.77	2.2/8
After the shocking breakup, Arie and Becca go their separate ways. Becca heads back to Minneapolis and cries while watching a video about her time with Arie. Arie later travels to Virginia Beach to see Lauren at her parents house where he suffers an anxiety attack. Then, Arie makes a confession to Lauren explaining what happened at the final rose ceremony. Becca confesses that she has felt depressed and struggled to find love. Chris shows billboards that have been seen nationwide, but they are digitally photoshopped. She later receives a reward of US$6,000 for American Association for Cancer Research. She has seen Arie since the breakup and accepted his apology. Season thirteen bachelor Jason Mesnick and his wife Molly are on the hot seat and discuss Arie's relationship with Lauren. Lauren explains how on New Year's Eve, Arie liked one of her photos on Instagram, then the following night, contacted her on the day of the premiere. Arie reveals that Lauren would move to Arizona to be with him, he then proposes to Lauren on one knee, asking for his mistakes to be forgotten, and Lauren accepts the proposal. The announcement for next Bachelorette is made: Chris names Becca as the next lead and she quickly begins her journey, meeting five guys for the first time.

== Post-show ==
During the live season finale, it was revealed that a few weeks after filming wrapped, Arie had quickly called off his engagement to Becca and started dating runner-up Lauren.

Arie and Lauren got engaged during the After the Final Rose special. Arie and Lauren got married on January 12, 2019. They have three children together, Alessi Ren (born May 29, 2019), and twins, Lux Jacob and Senna James (born June 11, 2021).

Becca got engaged to Thomas Jacobs, who was a contestant on season 17 of The Bachelorette, in May 2022.

== Controversies ==
=== Bekah Martinez missing person's case ===
Bekah Martinez was reported missing by her mother during the filming of this season. Her mother tried to claim that Martinez informed her she was working on a marijuana farm instead of being on national television and filed the missing person's report on November 18, 2017. Authorities from Humboldt County Sheriff's Department tried to locate and reach her but their attempts were unsuccessful. That very same day, Martinez eventually went home and remained on the missing person's list. Her mother reported her missing, but ended up discovering that Martinez was indeed not missing.

=== Minnesota Bachelor ban ===
In the aftermath of the season, Minnesota House of Representatives member Drew Christensen signed a document bill to ban Luyendyk to prevent travel from or to Minnesota, Becca Kufrin's home state. As stated on the document "the state of Minnesota hereby adopts a policy of zero tolerance of Arie Luyendyk, Jr. from season 22 of ‘The Bachelor.’ It is state policy that every person in the state has a right to live free from the presence of Arie Luyendyk, Jr. in the state."
