= Caelynn Miller-Keyes =

American television personality, model and former beauty pageant titleholder

- Born: Caelynn Marie Miller-Keyes; June 15, 1995 (age 31); Fredericksburg, Virginia, U.S.
- Education: Virginia Commonwealth University
- Height: 5 ft 6 in (1.68 m)
- Spouse: Dean Unglert (m. 2023)
- Beauty pageant titleholder
- Title: Miss Virginia Teen USA 2013; Miss North Carolina USA 2018
- Hair color: Brown
- Eye color: Hazel
- Major competitions: Miss Teen USA 2013 (Unplaced); Miss USA 2018 (1st Runner-Up)

Caelynn Marie Bell (née Miller-Keyes; born June 15, 1995) is an American television personality, model and beauty pageant titleholder. Miller-Keyes received national recognition after appearing as a contestant on season 23 of The Bachelor.

While competing in The Bachelor, Miller-Keyes received widespread attention and praise regarding her decision to detail the circumstances of a sexual assault she was the victim of while a college student. Her story was reported on by media outlets such as Forbes, Vogue, Inquisitr, Bustle, and Refinery29.

== Early life and education ==
Miller-Keyes was born in Fredericksburg, Virginia to parents Jerry Keyes and Jai-leah Miller; she was raised by her mother and stepfather John Kamenicky. Her mother and maternal grandmother are Native Americans, both enrolled with the Little Traverse Bay Bands of Odawa Indians. Her paternal grandmother was the first woman to become head of the Federal Bureau of Investigation in Los Angeles. As a child, she was diagnosed with encephalitis and was told by doctors she only had a 10% chance of ever walking again; she ultimately ended up fully recovering. Miller-Keyes attended Stafford Senior High School and Virginia Commonwealth University, where she majored in broadcast journalism. Prior to winning Miss North Carolina USA, Miller-Keyes moved from Virginia to Asheville, North Carolina and began working as a social media consultant.

== Career ==
=== Pageantry ===
Miller-Keyes's pageantry career began at the age of 16, after competing in Miss Virginia Teen USA 2013. She then went on to win the state title on her first attempt, and represented Virginia at Miss Teen USA 2013 at Atlantis Paradise Island in Nassau, Bahamas. Miller-Keyes ultimately did not place in the pageant and the pageant was won by Cassidy Wolf of California. Miller-Keyes later crowned Olivia Fletcher as her successor at the end of her reign.

After moving to North Carolina, Miller-Keyes competed in Miss North Carolina USA 2018, representing Asheville, where she ended up winning the title and being crowned by outgoing titleholder Katie Coble. As Miss North Carolina USA, Miller-Keyes was given the right to represent North Carolina at the Miss USA 2018 competition, held in Shreveport, Louisiana. While at Miss USA, Miller-Keyes advocated for her platform of sexual assault awareness. She went on to place as the first runner-up in the competition, behind eventual winner Sarah Rose Summers of Nebraska. After finishing her reign, Miller-Keyes was unable to crown her successor due to filming commitments for The Bachelor. Her successor, Cheslie Kryst, was instead crowned by Miss North Carolina Teen USA 2018 Kaaviya Sambasivam.

=== Reality television ===
In 2018, Miller-Keyes was cast in season 23 of The Bachelor, starring former professional football player Colton Underwood. Filming for the season took place throughout fall 2018, and Miller-Keyes was later revealed by the American Broadcasting Company (ABC) as a contestant on December 6, 2018. Hannah Brown, another contestant, was crowned Miss Alabama USA 2018 and was Miller-Keyes's roommate at Miss USA.

In the January 28, 2019, episode of the season, Miller-Keyes revealed to Underwood the details of a sexual assault that she was a victim of during her sophomore year of college, and how the experience led to her having difficulty opening up and trusting men for a period of time. Miller-Keyes received widespread attention and praise from the media after the episode aired, with outlets identifying the airing of their conversation as support for the Me Too movement. Miller-Keyes placed fourth in the season, being eliminated by Underwood during the hometown dates portion of the show in the episode aired on February 25, 2019. She began appearing on season six of Bachelor in Paradise in August 2019, before choosing to leave the show along with boyfriend Dean Unglert in the episode aired September 9, 2019.

== Personal life ==
As Miss North Carolina USA, Miller-Keyes revealed that she was a survivor of sexual assault and adopted sexual assault awareness as her primary platform of advocacy during the Miss USA competition. During season 23 of The Bachelor, Miller-Keyes went into detail regarding her assault, revealing that it occurred during her sophomore year of college when she and some friends were drugged and raped by a group of boys they were friends with. Miller-Keyes also had indecent pictures of her taken while she was incapacitated. After learning of her assault, Miller-Keyes reached out to hospitals for a rape kit, and was turned away by the first hospital, while the second hospital's investigation came back inconclusive due to the time that had passed since the assault. Of her assaulters, one was expelled from school while the others were left unpunished.

Miller-Keyes began a relationship with Dean Unglert during season six of Bachelor in Paradise. In January 2021, they purchased a house together in Summerlin, Nevada, where they permanently relocated that April. They got engaged in October 2022, and married on September 23, 2023, at a private mountain retreat in Meredith, Colorado. Upon marriage, they both changed their surnames to Bell in honor of his late mother.

== Filmography ==
Year	Title	Role	Notes
2018	Miss USA 2018	Herself	Miss North Carolina USA; first runner-up
2019	The Bachelor	Herself	Contestant; season 23; fourth place
2019	Bachelor in Paradise	Herself	Contestant; season 6

Awards and achievements
Preceded by Elizabeth Coakley	Miss Virginia Teen USA; 2013	Succeeded by Olivia Fletcher
Preceded by Katie Coble	Miss North Carolina USA; 2018	Succeeded by Cheslie Kryst
Preceded by (New Jersey) Chhavi Verg	Miss USA 1st runner-up 2018	Succeeded by (New Mexico) Alejandra Gonzalez
