= Bachelor in Paradise (American TV series) season 6 =

Season of television series

Bachelor in Paradise
- Season 6
- Promotional poster
- No. of episodes: 13

Release
- Original network: ABC
- Original release: August 5 – September 17, 2019

Season chronology
- ← Previous; Season 5 Next → Season 7

The sixth season of Bachelor in Paradise premiered on August 5, 2019. Chris Harrison reprises his role from The Bachelor and The Bachelorette as the host of the show.

== Production ==
As with the previous season, filming took place in the town of Sayulita, located in Vallarta-Nayarit, Mexico.

=== Casting ===
On June 17, 2019, Tayshia Adams, Cam Ayala, Demi Burnett, Clay Harbor, Blake Horstmann, John Paul Jones, and Bibiana Julian were revealed as the first seven contestants of Bachelor in Paradise on Good Morning America. Later that day during the premiere of Grand Hotel, former Bachelorette Hannah Brown revealed the rest of the original cast.

On July 2, 2019, Wells Adams was confirmed to be returning as the bartender.

In the episode aired on August 20, 2019, Kristian Haggerty joined the cast, becoming the second Bachelor in Paradise contestant to not have appeared on either The Bachelor or The Bachelorette and first who was not a relative of another cast member. Haggerty was in a relationship with Burnett prior to filming, and was brought onto the show after Burnett expressed her confusion regarding her having feelings for both Haggerty and contestant Derek Peth. To accommodate for Haggerty appearing on the show with Burnett, Burnett was allowed to give out a rose during the men's week while Haggerty gave out her roses during the women's week, as they were the first same-sex relationship to be featured on the American version of the franchise.

== Contestants ==
Name	Age	Residence	From	Arrived	Outcome
Chris Bukowski	32	Chicago, Illinois	The Bachelorette – Emily; The Bachelorette – Andi; Bachelor Pad – Season 3 Bachelor in Paradise season 1 & season 2	Week 1	Engaged
Katie Morton	27	Los Angeles, California	The Bachelor – Colton	Week 1	Engaged
Demi Burnett	24	Dallas, Texas	The Bachelor – Colton	Week 1	Engaged
Kristian Haggerty	27	Los Angeles, California	None	Week 3	Engaged
Dylan Barbour	25	San Diego, California	The Bachelorette – Hannah	Week 1	Engaged
Hannah Godwin	24	Birmingham, Alabama	The Bachelor – Colton	Week 1	Engaged
Clay Harbor	31	Chicago, Illinois	The Bachelorette – Becca	Week 1	Split Week 6
Nicole Lopez-Alvar	26	Miami, Florida	The Bachelor – Colton	Week 1	Split Week 6
John Paul Jones	24	New Carrollton, Maryland	The Bachelorette – Hannah	Week 1	Split Week 6
Tayshia Adams	28	Corona Del Mar, California	The Bachelor – Colton	Week 1	Split Week 6
Chase McNary	30	Denver, Colorado	The Bachelorette – JoJo	Week 4	Split Week 6
Angela Amezcua	29	Greenville, South Carolina	The Bachelor – Nick; Bachelor in Paradise —Season 5	Week 4	Split Week 6
Matt Donald	26	Los Gatos, California	The Bachelorette – Hannah	Week 4	Split Week 6
Bri Barnes	24	Los Angeles, California	The Bachelor – Colton	Week 5	Split Week 6
Haley Ferguson	26	Las Vegas, Nevada	The Bachelor – Ben H. Bachelor in Paradise season 3 & season 4	Week 3	Week 5
Revian Chang	24	Los Angeles, California	The Bachelor – Colton	Week 5	Week 5
Sydney Lotuaco	27	New York, New York	The Bachelor – Colton	Week 1	Week 5
Luke Stone	29	Washington, DC	The Bachelorette – Hannah	Week 4	Week 5
Connor Saeli	24	Dallas Texas	The Bachelorette – Hannah	Week 4	Week 6 (Quit)
Whitney Fransway	27	Los Angeles, California	The Bachelor – Nick	Week 5	Week 6 (Quit)
Blake Horstmann	30	Denver, Colorado	The Bachelorette – Becca	Week 1	Split Week 5
Kristina Schulman	27	Los Angeles, California	The Bachelor – Nick; Bachelor in Paradise —Season 4	Week 1	Split Week 5
Dean Unglert	28	Los Angeles, California	The Bachelorette – Rachel; Bachelor in Paradise — Season 4 The Bachelor Winter Games	Week 2 Week 5 (Returned)	Week 3 (Quit); Relationship Week 5
Caelynn Miller-Keyes	24	Los Angeles, California	The Bachelor – Colton	Week 1	Relationship Week 5
Mike Johnson	31	San Antonio, Texas	The Bachelorette – Hannah	Week 2	Week 4
Derek Peth	32	New York, New York	The Bachelorette – JoJo; Bachelor in Paradise — Season 4	Week 1	Week 4 (Quit)
Caitlin Clemmens	25	Toronto, Ontario	The Bachelor – Colton	Week 3	Week 3
Jennifer Saviano	29	Nashville, Tennessee	The Bachelor – Ben H. Bachelor in Paradise —Season 3	Week 3	Week 3
Tahzjuan Hawkins	25	Castle Pines, Colorado	The Bachelor – Colton	Week 3	Week 3
Cameron "Cam" Ayala	30	Austin, Texas	The Bachelorette – Hannah	Week 1	Week 2
Kevin Fortenberry	27	Chicago, Illinois	The Bachelorette – Hannah	Week 1	Week 2
Wills Reid	30	Los Angeles, California	The Bachelorette – Becca; Bachelor in Paradise — Season 5	Week 1	Week 2
Onyeka Ehie	25	Dallas, Texas	The Bachelor – Colton	Week 1	Week 2 (Quit)
Christian Estrada	29	New York, New York	The Bachelorette – Becca	Week 2	Week 2 (Removed)
Jordan Kimball	27	Crystal River, Florida	The Bachelorette – Becca; Bachelor in Paradise — Season 5	Week 2	Week 2 (Removed)
Annaliese Puccini	34	San Francisco, California	The Bachelor – Arie; Bachelor in Paradise — Season 5	Week 1	Week 1
Bibiana Julian	31	Miami, Florida	The Bachelor – Arie; The Bachelor Winter Games ''Bachelor in Paradise — Season 5	Week 1	Week 1
Jane Averbukh	26	West Hollywood, California	The Bachelor – Colton	Week 1	Week 1

== Elimination table ==
Place	Contestant	Week					
Place	Contestant	1	2	3	4	5	6
1–6	Chris	In	In	Date	In	Date	Engaged
1–6	Katie	In	In	Last	In	Last	Engaged
1–6	Demi	In	In	Date	In	Date	Engaged (Note: The contestant proposed to the contestant's partner at the commitment ceremony.)
1–6	Kristian	Wait (Note: The contestant was added to the show by producers and had not been in previous seasons of the franchise.)		Date	In	Date	Engaged
1–6	Dylan	In	In	Date	In	Date	Engaged
1–6	Hannah	In	In	Date	In	Date	Engaged
7–8	Clay	Date	In	In	In	Date	Split
7–8	Nicole	Date	Date	In	In	Date	Split
9–14	John Paul Jones	In	In	Date	In	In	Split
9–14	Tayshia	Date	In	In	In	In	Split
9–14	Chase	Wait			Date	In	Split
9–14	Angela	Wait (Note: The contestant was at Chris and Krystal's wedding prior to appearing on the show.)			Date	In	Split
9–14	Matt	Wait			Date	Date	Split
9–14	Bri	Wait				Date	Split
15-17	Haley	Wait		Date	In	Out	
15-17	Revian	Wait				Out	
15-17	Sydney	In	In	In	Date	Out	
18	Luke	Wait			Date	Out (Note: The contestant's choice denied the rose and the contestant was sent home.)	
19-20	Connor	Wait			Date	Quit	
19-20	Whitney	Wait				Quit	
21	Blake	Date	Last	Date	Last	Split	
22	Kristina	Last	In	In	Date	Split	
23–24	Dean	Wait	Date	Quit		Quit	
23–24	Caelynn	In	Date	In	Date	Quit	
25	Mike	Wait	Date	In	Out		
26	Derek	In	In	In	Quit		
27–29	Caitlin	Wait		Out			
27–29	Jennifer	Wait		Out			
27–29	Tahzjuan	Wait		Out			
30–32	Cam	In	Out				
30–32	Kevin	In	Out				
30–32	Wills	In	Out				
33	Onyeka	In	Quit				
34–35	Christian	Wait	Out				
34–35	Jordan	Wait	Out				
36–38	Annaliese	Out					
36–38	Bibiana	Out					
36–38	Jane	Out					

=== Key ===
The contestant is male.
The contestant is female.
Date The contestant went on a date and gave out a rose at the rose ceremony.
Date The contestant went on a date and got a rose at the rose ceremony.
In The contestant gave or received a rose at the rose ceremony, thus remaining in the competition.
Last The contestant received the last rose.
Last The contestant went on a date and received the last rose.
Out The contestant went on a date and was eliminated.
Out The contestant was eliminated.
Out The contestant went on a date and was eliminated by production from the show due to physical violence at the cocktail party.
Quit The contestant had a date and voluntarily left the show.
Quit The contestant had a date, gave out a rose at the rose ceremony and voluntarily left the show.
Quit The contestant voluntarily left the show.
Split The couple broke up and were eliminated.
Stay The couple decided to stay together and won the competition.
Wait The contestant had to wait before appearing in paradise.
Split/Stay The couple split, but later got back together.
Quit The couple left together to pursue a relationship.

== Episodes ==
No. overall	No. in season	Title	Original release date	Prod. code	U.S. viewers (millions)	Rating/share (18–49)
51	1	"Week 1: Part 1 (Season Premiere)"	August 5, 2019	601A	4.36	1.3/7
52	2	"Week 1: Part 2"	August 6, 2019	601B	3.56	1.1/6
53	3	"Week 2: Part 1"	August 12, 2019	602A	4.33	1.2/6
54	4	"Week 2: Part 2"	August 13, 2019	602B	4.07	1.1/6
55	5	"Week 3: Part 1"	August 19, 2019	603A	4.78	1.3/7
56	6	"Week 3: Part 2"	August 20, 2019	603B	4.12	1.1/6
57	7	"Week 4: Part 1"	August 26, 2019	604A	4.59	1.2/6
58	8	"Week 4: Part 2"	August 27, 2019	604B	3.95	1.1/6
59	9	"Week 5: Part 1"	September 2, 2019	605A	4.02	1.1/5
60	10	"Week 5: Part 2"	September 3, 2019	605B	4.05	1.1/6
61	11	"Week 6: Part 1"	September 9, 2019	606A	4.39	1.2/6
62	12	"Week 6: Part 2"	September 10, 2019	606B	4.14	1.1/5
63	13	"Week 7: Season Finale"	September 17, 2019	607	4.38	1.3/7
