= Michelle Randolph =

American actress (born 1997)

- Born: September 11, 1997 (age 29)
- Education: Film and Media Studies, Arizona State University, graduated in 2023
- Occupations: Actress, model
- Years active: 2017–present
- Relatives: Cassie Randolph (sister)

Michelle Randolph (born September 11, 1997) is an American actress and model who played Elizabeth Strafford in 1923 (2022–25), Ainsley Norris in Landman (2024–present) and Madison in Scream 7.

== Early life ==
Randolph was born on September 11, 1997, the middle of three children. Her older sister Cassie Randolph is a television personality who won season 23 of The Bachelor. Randolph grew up in Walnut Creek, California, before moving downstate to Huntington Beach, when she was 16. She graduated from Arizona State University in 2023 with a degree in Film and Media Studies.

== Career ==
Randolph signed as a model with Wilhelmina Models in 2016. At the age 16, she began acting in a series of low-budget films including House of The Witch (2017) and A Snow White Christmas (2018). She then accepted a main role as Elizabeth Strafford in the Taylor Sheridan series 1923, which marked a significant step forward in her career. In 2024, she starred in Landman (another show by Sheridan) as Ainsley Norris, the daughter of Billy Bob Thornton's character Tommy Norris. She played Madison in Scream 7, released on February 27, 2026.

== Filmography ==
=== Films ===
Year	Title	Role	Notes
2017	House of the Witch	Rachel	TV movie
2018	A Snow White Christmas	Blanca Snow	TV movie
2019	5 Years Apart	Brie	
2021	The Resort	Bree	
2024	The Throwback	Shea	
2026	Scream 7	Madison	
2026	Clashing Through the Snow †	Hannah Hendricks	Post-production

=== Series ===
Year	Title	Role	Notes
2022–2025	1923	Elizabeth Strafford	Main role; 14 episodes
2024–present	Landman	Ainsley Norris	Main role; 20 episodes
