= The Bachelorette (American TV series) season 15 =

15th season of television series

The Bachelorette
- Season 15
- Promotional poster
- Starring: Hannah Brown
- Presented by: Chris Harrison
- No. of contestants: 30
- Winner: Jed Wyatt
- Runner-up: Tyler Cameron
- No. of episodes: 13

Release
- Original network: ABC
- Original release: May 13 – July 30, 2019

Additional information
- Filming dates: March 16 – May 10, 2019

Season chronology
- ← Previous; Season 14 Next → Season 16

The fifteenth season of The Bachelorette premiered on May 13, 2019. The season featured Hannah Brown, a 24-year-old interior designer from Northport, Alabama. Brown was crowned Miss Alabama USA 2018 and represented Alabama at Miss USA 2018.

Brown finished in seventh place on season 23 of The Bachelor featuring Colton Underwood. She was the first Bachelorette lead not to have placed in the top four of a season of The Bachelor, and is the youngest bachelorette in the show's history.

The season concluded on July 30, 2019, with Brown accepting a proposal from 25-year-old singer/songwriter Jed Wyatt. However, during the After The Final Rose special, it was revealed that they called off their engagement in June 2019 after Brown discovered that Wyatt had a girlfriend at home. Wyatt also admitted that he only went on the show to promote his music career.

== Production ==
=== Casting and contestants ===
Hannah Brown was named as the Bachelorette during the After the Final Rose special of the 23rd season of The Bachelor on March 12, 2019. During the live finale of the latter season, Brown met the first five contestants: Luke P., Cam, Dustin, Connor and Luke S.

Notable contestants included Connor Jenkins, the son of former WGN News and FOX News Chicago anchor Nancy Loo; and Daron Blaylock, the son of retired NBA basketball player Mookie Blaylock.

=== Filming and development ===
Filming began on March 16, 2019, at The Bachelor Mansion. On March 21, the first filming was reported in Newport, Rhode Island, and several reports of filming in Boston, Massachusetts, a week later. Outside of the United States, production crews were reported in Inverness, Scotland, United Kingdom, located at MacGregor's Bar over the River Ness, as well as in Gouda and The Hague in the Netherlands. The season also included visits to Latvia and Greece. The visit to Latvia marked the first major U.S.-based television or film production to take place in the country and the first visit in the former Soviet Union for the Bachelor Nation franchise.

Celebrity appearances for season fifteen included runway model J. Alexander, RuPaul's Drag Race drag queens Alyssa Edwards and Alaska, actors Jason Biggs and Jenny Mollen, Danish pop band Lukas Graham, American country singer Jake Owen, and Boston Celtics basketball players Jaylen Brown and Terry Rozier.

== Contestants ==
33 potential contestants were revealed on March 14, 2019.

The final cast of 30 men was announced on May 7, 2019.

Name	Age	Hometown	Occupation	Outcome	Place	Ref
Jed Wyatt	25	Sevierville, Tennessee	Singer/Songwriter	Winner	1	
Tyler Cameron	26	Jupiter, Florida	General Contractor	Runner-Up	2	
Peter Weber	27	Westlake Village, California	Pilot	Week 9	3	
Luke Parker	24	Gainesville, Georgia	Import/Export Manager	Week 9	4	
Garrett Powell	27	Homewood, Alabama	Golf Pro	Week 7	5	
Mike Johnson	31	San Antonio, Texas	Portfolio Manager	Week 7	6	
Connor Saeli	24	Birmingham, Michigan	Investment Analyst	Week 7	7	
Dustin Kendrick	30	Goose Island, Illinois	Real Estate Broker	Week 6	8–9	
Dylan Barbour	24	Seal Beach, California	Tech Entrepreneur	Week 6	8–9	
Devin Harris	27	Sherman Oaks, California	Talent Manager	Week 5	10–12	
Grant Eckel	30	San Clemente, California	Unemployed	Week 5	10–12	
Kevin Fortenberry	27	Manteno, Illinois	Behavioral Health Specialist	Week 5	10–12	
John Paul Jones	24	Lanham, Maryland	Financial Analyst	Week 4	13–14	
Matteo Valles	25	Atlanta, Georgia	Management Consultant	Week 4	13–14	
Luke Stone	29	Needham, Massachusetts	Political Consultant	Week 4	15 (quit)	
Cameron "Cam" Ayala	30	Austin, Texas	Software Sales	Week 3	16–18	
Joey Jones	33	Bethesda, Maryland	Finance Manager	Week 3	16–18	
Jonathan Saunders	27	Los Angeles, California	Server	Week 3	16–18	
Tyler Gwozdz†	28	Boca Raton, Florida	Psychology Graduate Student	Week 3	19 (DQ) (Note: Prior to the start of episode 3, Gwozdz was disqualified from the show by producers after accusations regarding inappropriate behavior in past relationships emerged online.)	
Connor Jenkins	28	Newport Beach, California	Sales Manager	Week 2	20–22	
Daron Blaylock	25	Buckhead, Georgia	IT Consultant	Week 2	20–22	
Matthew Spraggins	23	Newport Beach, California	Car Bid Spotter	Week 2	20–22	
Brian Bowles	30	Louisville, Kentucky	Math Teacher	Week 1	23–29	
Chasen Coscia	27	Longview, Washington	Pilot	Week 1	23–29	
Hunter Jones	24	Westchester, California	Pro Surfer	Week 1	23–29	
Joe Barsano	30	South Barrington, Illinois	The Box King	Week 1	23–29	
Matt Donald	26	Los Gatos, California	Medical Device Salesman	Week 1	23–29	
Ryan Spirko	25	Easton, Pennsylvania	Roller Boy	Week 1	23–29	
Thomas Staton	27	Southfield, Michigan	International Pro Basketball Player	Week 1	23–29	
Scott Andersen	28	West Dundee, Illinois	Software Sales Executive	Week 1	30	

=== Future appearances ===
==== The Bachelor ====
Season 24

Peter Weber was chosen as the lead for season 24 of The Bachelor. Additionally, Brown appeared in two episodes in season 24, and Tyler Cameron also appeared in one episode of season 25.

==== Bachelor in Paradise ====
Season 6

Cam Ayala, Kevin Fortenberry, John Paul Jones, Dylan Barbour, Connor Saeli, Mike Johnson, Matt Donald, and Luke Stone competed in season 6 of Bachelor in Paradise. Brown also made an appearance to give advice to fellow season 23 contestant, Demi Burnett. Ayala and Fortenberry were eliminated in week 2. Johnson was eliminated in week 4. Saeli quit in week 5. Stone was eliminated in week 5. Donald and John Paul Jones split from Bri Barnes and Tayshia Adams, respectively, in week 6. Barbour got engaged to Hannah Godwin in week 6.

==== Dancing with the Stars ====
Season 28

Brown competed in and won season 28 of Dancing With the Stars.

==== The Traitors ====
Season 2

Weber participated in season 2 of The Traitors.

==== Destination X ====
Weber competed in season 1 of Destination X.

== Call-out order ==
Order	Bachelors	Week									
Order	Bachelors	1	2	3	4	5	6	7	8 (Note: After being unable to decide whom to send home in Episode 8, Brown decided to not give out a final rose and instead take all four men to the fantasy suite dates.)	9	10
1	Garrett	Cam	Jed	Mike	Jed	Mike	Garrett	Jed	Peter	Jed	Jed
2	Mike	Luke P.	Tyler G.	Connor S.	Garrett	Jed	Tyler C.	Tyler C.	Tyler C.	Tyler C.	Tyler C.
3	Jed	Mike	Dustin	Peter	Tyler C.	Connor S.	Peter	Peter	Jed; Luke P.	Peter	
4	Tyler C.	Connor S.	Tyler C.	Jed	Peter	Tyler C.	Jed	Luke P.	Jed; Luke P.	Luke P.	
5	Dylan	Matthew	Garrett	Tyler C.	Connor S.	Dustin	Mike	Garrett			
6	Connor S.	Connor J.	Devin	Dustin	Dylan	Peter	Connor S.	Mike			
7	Devin	Jed	Connor S.	Dylan	Dustin	Dylan	Luke P.	Connor S.			
8	John Paul Jones	Dustin	Luke P.	Grant	Mike	Garrett	Dustin; Dylan				
9	Brian	Joey	Dylan	Luke P.	Kevin	Luke P.	Dustin; Dylan				
10	Scott	Devin	Luke S.	Garrett	Devin	Devin; Grant; Kevin					
11	Matteo	Peter	Mike	John Paul Jones	Grant	Devin; Grant; Kevin					
12	Daron	Dylan	Peter	Matteo	Luke P.	Devin; Grant; Kevin					
13	Tyler G.	Matteo	Kevin	Devin	John Paul Jones; Matteo						
14	Thomas	Jonathan	Jonathan	Luke S.	John Paul Jones; Matteo						
15	Matthew	Tyler C.	Joey	Kevin	Luke S.						
16	Joe	Tyler G.	Matteo	Cam; Joey; Jonathan							
17	Joey	Daron	John Paul Jones	Cam; Joey; Jonathan							
18	Connor J.	Luke S.	Grant	Cam; Joey; Jonathan							
19	Ryan	Garrett	Cam	Tyler G.							
20	Hunter	Grant	Connor J. Daron; Matthew								
21	Grant	Kevin	Connor J. Daron; Matthew								
22	Jonathan	John Paul Jones	Connor J. Daron; Matthew								
23	Kevin	Brian; Chasen; Hunter; Joe; Matt; Ryan; Thomas									
24	Luke P.	Brian; Chasen; Hunter; Joe; Matt; Ryan; Thomas									
25	Luke S.	Brian; Chasen; Hunter; Joe; Matt; Ryan; Thomas									
26	Dustin	Brian; Chasen; Hunter; Joe; Matt; Ryan; Thomas									
27	Cam	Brian; Chasen; Hunter; Joe; Matt; Ryan; Thomas									
28	Matt	Brian; Chasen; Hunter; Joe; Matt; Ryan; Thomas									
29	Chasen	Brian; Chasen; Hunter; Joe; Matt; Ryan; Thomas									
30	Peter	Scott									

The contestant received a rose before the season began
The contestant received Hannah's first impression rose
The contestant received a rose outside of a rose ceremony or date
The contestant received a rose during a date
The contestant was eliminated
The contestant was eliminated during a date
The contestant was eliminated outside the rose ceremony
The contestant was disqualified from the competition
The contestant was part of non-elimination bottom two
The contestant quit the competition
The contestant won the competition

== Episodes ==
No. overall	No. in season	Title	Original release date	Prod. code	U.S. viewers (millions)	Rating/share (18–49)
157	1	"Week 1: Season Premiere"	May 13, 2019	1501	4.78	1.4/6
The season begins with a champagne toast between Hannah and The Bachelor castmates Demi Burnett and Katie Morton. Hannah greets the men at the mansion later that night. Connor S. jumps over the fence; John Paul Jones says his name three times; Joey presents a baby basket that contains wine to make a toast; Ryan rides on rollerskates; Jonathan presents a box of pizza via a mimicked proposal; Luke P. climbs up over the limousine to growl at Hannah; Cam, who already has his first impression rose from the season finale of The Bachelor, throws a bouquet of roses; Matt drives on a tractor; and Peter presents a wing pin. Once they are all inside, Connor J. calls Hannah to a bachelorette party game, gifting her with a crown as the game ends, and Scott shows his blueprint designs to Hannah in reference to her status as an interior designer. Midway through the first night, Demi and Katie show up outside the mansion to watch Hannah and the men on a surveillance scene. Demi learns Scott has a girlfriend back home, and Hannah sends him off the show. Luke P. receives the first impression rose. At the rose ceremony, Brian, Chasen, Hunter, Joe, Matt, Ryan, and Thomas are sent home.
158	2	"Week 2"	May 20, 2019	1502	4.52	1.2/5
Grant, Luke S., Mike, Jed, Jonathan, John Paul Jones, Dylan, and Luke P. attend the first group date of the season at Belasco Theater, headed by drag queens Alyssa Edwards and Alaska and runway coach J. Alexander, where they judge the Mr. Right pageant. With Chris as emcee, Mike walks around in heels and Jed sings a song with a guitar. Luke P. wins the Mr. Right pageant by declaring his love for Hannah. At the night portion, the men question Luke P.'s sincerity. Mike asks if Luke P. is just there to win. Jed receives the first group date rose. Tyler G. takes the first one-on-one date of the season to the San Gabriel Mountains, where he and Hannah go racing on an ATV course. While they are cuddling on a couch, they discuss the pressure of having the first one-on-one, as Hannah did on Colton's season. At dinner, they talk about their futures and Tyler G. receives a rose. Devin, Matteo, Daron, Connor J., Kevin, Dustin, Tyler C., Joey, Peter, and Garrett go on the week's second group date, where they travel to a warehouse for a roller derby judged by Chris Harrison and Fred Willard. At the after-party, Cam, who didn't have a date that week, crashes the party to see Hannah. Tyler C., Garrett, and Kevin confront Cam about interrupting their date. Dustin receives the group date rose. Hannah cries at the cocktail party, saying it's "hard to make decisions." Kevin pulls her aside but is interrupted by Cam, carrying a box of chicken nuggets and inviting them for a "ceremony". Kevin calls Cam a control freak. Luke P. invites Hannah to a makeshift massage table and they kiss. Jed walks in on Hannah and a shirtless Luke P., embarrassing her. At the rose ceremony, Connor J., Daron, and Matthew are eliminated. Later, Luke P. approaches Hannah during her interview, and they make out again.
159	3	"Week 3"	May 27, 2019	1503	4.67	1.1/5
Prior to the start of the episode, Tyler G. had to leave the show when details of past inappropriate behavior emerged online. Jonathan, Matteo, John Paul Jones, Kevin, Jed, Tyler C., Mike, and Cam are chosen for the first group date of the week. It is centered around reproduction and led by Jason Biggs and Jenny Mollen of The Try Guys. The men put on clothespin nipples to simulate breastfeeding, care for a fake baby, and sit for a labor simulator. At the night portion, Jed and Mike get one-on-one time, before Mike is interrupted by Cam on three separate occasions. Jonathan interrupts Cam to get "revenge". Mike receives the group date rose. Connor S. receives the week's one-on-one date to go sailing. Hannah cancels because she is ill, but she invites him over instead. He leaves cute sticky note messages. Later that night, Connor S. receives a rose. They dance to a private concert starring Lukas Graham, where he sings "Love Someone". Luke P., Dylan, Garrett, Grant, Peter, Joey, Luke S., and Devin go on the second group date, a photoshoot promoting The Secret Life of Pets 2 led by photographer Franco Lacosta. Franco pairs each man with a "pet model". Former contestant and Hannah's friend Demi Burnett hires a makeup artist and an animal handler to flirt with the contestants while Hannah views from hidden cameras. At the end of the photoshoot, Luke P. tries to "steal" Hannah but is turned down and told to "slow his roll." He interrupts two more one-on-ones and is turned down by Hannah both times. Peter receives the group date rose. The next day, Chris Harrison announces the cocktail party will be replaced with a tailgate party. Cam tells the other men to wait for him to pull Hannah aside about a serious issue from his past, which the other men do not appreciate. After Cam talks to Hannah, Mike confronts Hannah about Cam's supposed intentions. Cam is pulled aside and confronted by Hannah over an attempt to get a "pity rose." At the rose ceremony, Cam, Joey, and Jonathan are eliminated.
160	4	"Week 4: Newport, Rhode Island"	June 3, 2019	1504	5.51	1.5/7
With fifteen contestants remaining, Chris Harrison announces the men will travel to Newport, Rhode Island. Jed receives the first one-on-one date to explore Boston, where they tour Quincy Market, take pictures in a photo booth, stop by for drinks and a kiss at Cheers, get ice cream at Halo Top Creamery, and finish at Auerbach Center, home of the Boston Celtics. They play with point guard Terry Rozier and shooting guard Jaylen Brown. At the dinner portion, Jed receives a rose. Dylan, Matteo, John Paul Jones, Connor S., Garrett, Dustin, Devin, Grant, Peter, Kevin, Mike, Luke S., and Luke P. travel to Fort Adams to train with the Newport Rugby Club, splitting into a Blue and Green team to play in front of a crowd. At half time, the Blue team leads 0-5. Kevin dislocates his shoulder and is taken to the hospital. During the second half of the game, Luke P. picks up Luke S, slams him to the ground, and knees him in the head. Blue wins the game 7-10. Later, Luke P. tells Hannah that Luke S. swung at him and he acted in self-defense. He says that when Hannah is gone, Luke S. only speaks about his liquor company. Luke S. denies this, mentioning both Luke P.'s comments about going home and his issues with the other men. The other men support Luke S, and after Kevin returns (with an agnioclaviculous joint sprain), they confront Luke P. Garrett tells Hannah he is "crushing on [her] hard" and receives the group date rose. On the second one-on-one date, Tyler C. comforts Hannah and they go fishing. Tyler receives the rose at the dinner portion of the date. They travel to the Jane Pickens Theater & Event Center for a public Jake Owen concert. At the cocktail party, located at Belcourt of Newport, Peter asks Hannah if she will be his girlfriend. Mike and Luke P. have a confrontation after Mike's one-on-one time with Hannah, and the contestants deal with the fact that Luke P. might get a rose. Hannah says that she is irritated with both Lukes. Luke P. admits in front of the men that he thinks Luke S. is there for the right reasons, but then tells Hannah that Luke S. requested a good word and is there for the wrong reasons. Hannah sits both Lukes down to talk. The episode ends with no rose ceremony.
161	5	"Week 5: Scotland"	June 11, 2019 (Note: The episode was intended to air on June 10, 2019 and it was moved to June 11, due to the game 5 of the 2019 NBA Finals.)	1505	4.75	1.3/7
Continuing from the previous episode, Luke S. and Luke P. debate in front of Hannah. Hannah walks off from the conversation, leaving Chris Harrison to tell both Luke S. and Luke P. that the cocktail party is canceled and the rose ceremony is happening immediately. As Hannah starts the rose ceremony, Luke S. pulls Hannah aside, apologizes, and quits the competition. John Paul Jones and Matteo are eliminated. The cast arrives at the Achnagairn Estate in Inverness, Scotland. They go to the Hootananny Ceilidh Bar and Hannah tells the men to "reset". Hannah picks Mike to explore Scotland on a one-on-one date, where they explore the shop Books, Maps, and Prints, and try Black Death candy from Mr Simms' Olde Sweet Shoppe. They try whiskey and haggis. At dinner, Mike opens up about his ex and receives a rose. Devin, Tyler, Jed, Dylan, Grant, Connor S., Dustin, Peter, Kevin, and Garret are chosen to go on the group date, where they will participate in old Scottish Highland games in front of a crowd. They train and put on kilts. The games include axe-throwing, yoke races, and Scottish blackhole wrestling. After everyone competes, Jed requests to get pinned by Hannah and wins the competition. Mike confronts Luke P. about what he will say on his upcoming one-on-one date back at the estate. At dinner, Jed has the first one-on-one time and Hannah reveals that they share one square foot of the land for winning the competition. Kevin walks in on Jed and Hannah kissing, which upsets him because he and Hannah have not kissed. Peter and Hannah play snooker and end up kissing on the snooker table. Back at the estate, Mike has left the room, so Luke P. receives the date card. Jed receives the group date rose. The next morning, as Luke P. leaves for his one-on-one date, he attempts and fails to make small talk with the other men. Hannah and Luke start their date in a field of flowers. They talk on the side of Urquhart Castle overlooking Loch Ness about why the other contestants don't like Luke P. He admits that he "screwed up" but still thinks that Luke S. was there for the wrong reasons, that the other men "blow it up way out of proportion", and that "everybody loves him." Hannah calls him arrogant and tries to ask how the conflict makes him feel. He says it is unfair but it does not affect him emotionally. Hannah walks off in frustration, speaks to the crew, and tells Luke P. that she "needs more." She asks to know "the real stuff" and not what makes him look good. Hannah pauses the conversation and they go to view a castle. During an interview, Hannah states that she wants to send Luke P. home, but that she can't do it, even though she can't make excuses for him anymore. At dinner, Luke P. admits that he is trying to be perfect and that it is hard for him to let loose. He says he loves "every single thing" about Hannah, and she says that she is not perfect. Luke P. asks what his flaws are that Hannah doesn't like, but Hannah tells him to own up to them himself. Hannah questions how she feels. The episode ends with no rose ceremony.
162	6	"The Journey So Far"	June 17, 2019	1505B	5.53	1.5/7
Continuing from the previous episode in Scotland, Hannah sends Luke P. home. He walks away, returns shortly, and they fight. Eventually, off-screen, she allows him to stay. Mike says “It’s still the Luke P. show, homie. And it’s hella annoying.” The morning of the cocktail party, Luke P. goes to a church to pray. At the cocktail party, Garrett grabs Hannah to ask if Luke P. brought up any other men during their date. Hannah says he did, but only because she asked. Connor S. walks in and steals Hannah away. Garrett confronts Luke P. about his conversation with Hannah. Luke P. tries to defend himself but is constantly interrupted by the other men. A loud argument breaks out, cutting off Connor S.'s one-on-one time. Hannah yells at the men. She leaves, but they continue arguing loudly. She returns, tells Luke P. to stop making excuses, and tells the other men to stop focusing on him. She leaves crying. Chris Harrison hugs and tries to reassure Hannah. Hannah cancels the cocktail party and the episode cuts to the rose ceremony. Devin, Grant, and Kevin are eliminated. Hannah says she is angry at all the men, and immediately leaves for the night. The next morning, the show moves to Riga, Latvia as the content portion comes to a close and the interview portion of the episode begins. Chris interviews Hannah in Latvia. She says that she is trying to stay hopeful, that she feels like the show might have been a mistake, but that she won't end it early. The episode ends at the Bachelor mansion in Los Angeles, California, where Chris interviews Hannah, and we see unseen footage from previous episodes.
163	7	"Week 6: Latvia"	June 24, 2019	1506	5.72	1.5/7
Eric Bigger, a contestant from the thirteenth season of The Bachelorette, and Nick Viall cameo in a commercial segment promoting Annabelle Comes Home. The show opens in Riga, Latvia. The men explore the streets, eventually arriving at Pullman Riga Old Town Hotel. Garrett receives the first date, which makes Luke P. jealous. They meet in the forest, and it is revealed they are going naked bungee jumping from a cable car in Sigulda. Hank and another girl greet them, saying that naked bungee jumping is a tradition for couples in Latvia. After reluctantly going bungee jumping, Garrett reassures Hannah that his heart is in the process. Hannah says that the date was just the start of the week. At dinner, Garrett asks about Hannah's past, and she says she won't let fear control her. They both talk about trust and falling in love. Garrett confesses that he is falling in love, and Garrett receives the rose. We learn that only Peter will be excluded from the group date. Garrett describes his date to the other men, and Luke P. insults him and accuses him of lying. The next morning, Hannah and the men explore Riga Central Market. They cheer with vodka, pickles, and cheese. Tyler C. gets Hannah flowers. Dylan and Tyler C. arm wrestle at a pub. On the subway, Hannah shares about her date with Garrett. Luke P. is frustrated it was true. Dinner begins with Tyler C. confessing he is falling in love with Hannah. Jed plays the piano for her. Luke P. compares being cheated on, which Hannah has, to the bungee jumping date. Hannah says it wasn't sexual. Tyler C. gets the group date rose. Peter and Hannah have a spa date in the Latvian countryside. They meet Andris and Aija who put wreath-like objects on their heads. They perform a ritual of making honey sauce. They are rubbed with plants and go to the Pirts, where they kiss. They sit in a hot tub and talk about the previous week. Peter tells Hannah that he is all in. At the dinner portion, Hannah asks whether Peter's career as a pilot interferes with relationships, prompting him to discuss an ex. She opens up about being engaged twice. Peter receives the one-on-one rose. Peter and Hannah go near the water and kiss at a fireworks show. Peter later talks about his one-on-one date with the men, and Jed leaves to see Hannah. He plays a song outside, and she invites him in. He plays the guitar for Hannah in bed and they make out. He confesses that "[he] is really falling in love with [her]." Back at the Pullman, Garrett tells Luke P. to stay in his lane, and Luke P. says that Garrett is invading his lane. Luke P. wants their conversation to stay out of the rose ceremony the following day, but Garrett refuses to keep it private. Luke P. kicks Garrett out of the room. Hannah makes an unexpected visit and takes Luke P. aside. Hannah expresses her appreciation for their "real" conversation earlier, but she says it did not sit well with her. Hannah says that Luke P. doesn't own her body, and Luke P. says that he will never control her. They debate and Hannah questions whether their relationship is "on track." Luke P. asks for forgiveness and gets no response. He returns to the men, and they talk about his conversation with Garrett. Tyler C. accuses Luke P. of trying to be the "big dog". Another argument breaks out, which Jed calms down. Chris Harrison enters announcing that Hannah is upset and has canceled the cocktail party yet again. The men blame Luke P. and walk out on him. At the rose ceremony, Dustin and Dylan are eliminated, and the remaining men are angry that Luke P. remains.
164	8	"Week 7: Amsterdam"	July 1, 2019	1507	5.71	1.5/8
The show moves to Amsterdam, Netherlands, and tensions are high with hometowns the next week. The contestants are at the Kurhaus Hotel in The Hague when the date card arrives. Hannah picks Jed for the first one-on-one of the episode. They explore the city, get chocolates and flowers, and go on a boat. They meet a couple who have been married for fifty-four years but dated for only ten days. At dinner, Hannah admits she is falling for multiple men. She says that knew that she was falling in love with Jed while they were dancing in the streets. Jed affirms that he is falling in love with Hannah, and she gives him a rose. We learn that Tyler C. will get the next one-on-one date. On the date, Tyler C. and Hannah ride horses, which scares Tyler C. They struggle with the horses while exploring The Hague. They get ice cream after failing to get waffles. They then get pickled herrings, which Hannah reluctantly eats but likes. Tyler C. speaks about his and Hannah's missed opportunities, and Hannah pushes Tyler C. to open up about his experience on the show. Hannah wants Tyler C. not to hold back, and wants to know that both of them are "in this thing." At the dinner portion, Hannah pushes Tyler C. to open up about what is hard and scary. Tyler C. speaks about his parents' divorce and says he worries about failing at marriage. Hannah shares a similar sentiment about her parents' communication. Hannah gives Tyler C. a rose, and Tyler C. says that he is falling in love with Hannah. Back at the hotel, Mike receives the next one-on-one date, which makes Connor S. angry. Connor S. goes to Hannah, but she sends him home, saying she feels that there are stronger relationships. The following morning, Mike and Hannah travel to Utrecht and bike around the city, leading to an artist. Hannah draws Mike, and Mike draws Hannah. Luta, the artist, asks Mike and Hannah to change into robes. She draws a portrait of them. Before dinner, Hannah contemplates about whether or not to continue with Mike. She sends him home, saying she does not think she can see a future with him. Back at the hotel, Tyler C. calls Luke P. a villain. A crew member comes in and takes Mike's bag, signifying to the other men that he was eliminated. The other men criticize Luke P.'s excitement that Mike was eliminated. Peter and Garrett are concerned about the three-on-one the following day. The following day, Jed tells Luke P. not to worry about the other guys, saying to "keep [his] head out of [his] ass." Peter, Luke P. and Garrett travel to Gouda, Netherlands for the date. Luke P. grabs Hannah first. He talks about Jed's quote from earlier and Garrett being fake-nice. Hannah says in an interview that she is tired of the drama. Garrett talks to Hannah next, and Hannah mentions what Luke P. said about him, which they quickly resolve. Garrett tells Luke P. that he will be sent home, and they argue again. Luke P. screams at Garrett and angers Peter. Peter, on his one-on-one, tells Hannah what he loves about her. Peter receives the group date rose, allowing him to skip the dinner portion of the date. At the dinner portion, Luke P. admits that he was slightly addicted to drinking and sex in college. He says God came to him in the shower and it reformed him. Garrett says "I love you" to Hannah. Hannah eventually gives the final rose of the episode to Luke P., sending Garrett home. The men are again angry that Luke P. remains.
165	9	"Week 8: Hometowns"	July 8, 2019	1508	6.04	1.5/8
Hannah arrives in Westlake Village, California to meet Peter. They ride in Peter's sports car, where she finds a condom in the car's center console. They arrive at Peter's private plane. They fly, overlooking the entire view of the Bachelor Mansion. They go to his house, where Hannah meets Peter's parents and brother, and they share about their experiences on the show. They eat Cuban food and do a German prayer. Peter's brother talks to Hannah about Peter's past relationships, and Peter's parents compliment her. The next stop is at Jupiter, Florida, where Hannah and Tyler get on a boat. Tyler drives the boat to show Hannah his hometown. Then, they jump into the water. Tyler points out his childhood home. They go to a beach bar and dance to reggae music. Tyler explains his dad's health concern. Hannah meets several of Tyler's relatives. Tyler's brother overhears his stories and Hannah sits down over with the brother. Tyler and his mom discuss whether he is ready to propose to Hannah. Tyler's dad expresses worry about Tyler being in love and getting his heart broken. Hannah arrives in Gainesville, Georgia to meet Luke. They attend Sunday School in Oakwood's Court Cafeteria and meet several of his friends. Luke leads the bible study group. Hannah meets Luke's family. They question why Luke is still on the show if he has been having so many issues. Luke's father asks him if Hannah is worth it, and he says "a hundred percent" and that he loves Hannah. At the end of the date, Luke apologizes for the problems with the other men. Hannah says that she is falling in love with him. At the park in Knoxville, Tennessee, Jed takes Hannah to a studio, andhey write a song together, with lyrics about their date in Boston. As they finish recording the song, Jed says he loves her. Jed brings Hannah to his family in Sevierville later that night, Jed's father talks about Jed's career while his mother talks to Hannah. Hannah sits down with Jed's sister, and she says Hannah will interfere with Jed's music career. The rose ceremony is back in Bachelor Mansion, where Peter and Tyler get the first two roses. Hannah stops the ceremony abruptly before talking to Chris, leaving Luke and Jed waiting. Hannah is unable to make a decision and says she cannot give a final rose. Luke and Jed both get a rose and remain on the show.
166	10	"Week 9: Fantasy Suites"	July 15, 2019	1509	6.46	1.7/8
Hannah arrives in the Greek island of Crete as overnight dates have begun. Peter has the first date with Hannah, sailing on the Aegean Sea. Later that night in Agios Nikolaos, Peter opens up about his thoughts on a potential engagement, which ends with Hannah inviting him to the fantasy suite. Tyler has the next date at a spa, reassures Hannah that his family approved of her, and gives her a massage. During the night portion, they talk about their relationship. Hannah expresses that although she does not want to be intimate with him, she would like to take the time in the fantasy suite to develop their emotional connection. Tyler accepts, and they spend the night in a houseboat. Jed meets with Hannah in the town of Vrachasi in Lasithi to celebrate and dance with a Greek family. During the night portion, Jed expresses his concern to Hannah about Luke's behavior. Hannah becomes frustrated and tells Jed that her and Luke's relationship is wholly separate from theirs. At the end of the night, Hannah invites him to the fantasy suite, and Jed accepts. Luke's date with Hannah is in Santorini, where they explore via a helicopter. During dinner, Luke discusses his concerns about Hannah's potential intimacy with the other men, stating that it would cause him to leave. Furious with the way Luke conveyed his thoughts and feeling that he has shamed her for her actions, Hannah sends him home, and the episode ends with no rose ceremony.
167	11	"The Men Tell All"	July 22, 2019	N/A	6.60	1.7/8
The episode begins with the conclusion of the rose ceremony from the previous episode. Tyler, Jed, and Peter arrive before it is revealed that Luke P. has returned in a last attempt to woo Hannah. She refuses to talk to him and sends him home for the final time. The show then cuts to the Men Tell All, where Luke P. begins without the other men present. Luke P. states that he has no regrets and would not change his behavior, but then clarifies that he has made mistakes and wishes to learn from them. John Paul Jones has a hot seat next, where he gives out chicken nuggets to the audience and a fan cuts off a lock of his hair. Mike also receives a hot seat, where he goes through his break up with Hannah. Finally, Hannah takes the stage and confronts Luke P. about his behavior, before addressing the other men.
168	12	"Week 10: Season Finale"	July 29, 2019	1510A	7.22	1.9/9
Continuing from the rose ceremony in Greece after Hannah sends Luke home, Hannah gives Jed and Tyler roses, sending Peter home heartbroken. During the live show, Peter reunites with Hannah as they reminisce about their relationship, saying that a piece of his heart will always love her. Back in Greece, Tyler is the first to meet with Hannah's family, where he opens up about the fantasy suites and his intentions with Hannah's parents. Both give Hannah their approval of Tyler, and Hannah reveals to Tyler that she is falling in love with him. The next day, Jed meets with the family where Hannah's parents voice their concerns about the stability of Jed's music career, frustrating Hannah. She then meets with Tyler for their final date, which involves horseback riding in Fourni, where Tyler reassures Hannah that he is ready to propose. Jed's final date with Hannah is on the water, where Hannah feels seasick. The show ends with Chris Harrison and Hannah both promising to put the rumors to an end on After the Final Rose.
169	13	"After the Final Rose"	July 30, 2019	1510B	7.48	2.1/10
Hannah feels unwell about her decision and asks to exit the limo on her way to the proposal ceremony. She slips and falls, and a producer asks if she can go through with the proposal. She says yes. Tyler exits the limo first, indicating that he will not receive the final rose. He begins to propose, but Hannah cuts him off to let him know he has not won. Tyler says he will always support her and departs. Jed shows up, and plays a song for his proposal, and she accepts. They share footage of their time being engaged. The day after their engagement, we learn that Jed warned Hannah that he had a casual fling before the show. This upset Hannah, but she accepted it. A few weeks after filming ended, Hannah and Jed reunited in a safe house in Los Angeles, as news broke on Jed's serious relationship prior to the show. Jed tries to explain his side of the story, claiming that his relationship prior to the show "wasn't serious" despite telling her he loved her. Hannah removes her ring and tells Jed that this was not the engagement she accepted. In the live show, Hannah announces that she ended their engagement after a People magazine report about Jed's relationship was released. Jed meets Hannah on stage and apologizes, saying he still loves her, but she tells him she no longer feels the same way. Jed leaves the stage. Tyler is brought to the stage, where Chris Harrison pushes Hannah to say what she is feeling. She admits that she still has feelings for Tyler, and she asks Tyler out on a date to grab a drink. Tyler accepts. Hannah confesses this was not the ending she had hoped for, but that she is excited for the future as she does not "need" a husband or the validation she once craved, she only wants a husband.

== Controversy ==
On June 18, 2019, People released a story that contestant Jed Wyatt was in a relationship with Nashville musician Haley Stevens before and during filming of the season. Stevens stated that Wyatt promised her he was going on the show purely to further his music career, that he did not intend to begin a relationship with Brown, and any appearance of him pursuing Hannah Brown was simply "acting". She photographed an alleged note from Wyatt saying "someday we will be thankful for all of this". Brown ended her relationship with Wyatt following this news.
