= Clashing Through the Snow =

- Release poster
- Directed by: Carlson Young
- Written by: Daniel Mackey; Rebecca Ewing
- Produced by: McG; Mary Viola; Lena Roklin
- Starring: Christopher Briney; Michelle Randolph; Lukas Gage; Paris Hilton; Julia Fox; PJ Byrne; Andrew Schulz
- Cinematography: Shane Hurlbut
- Edited by: Julia Wong
- Music by: Isom Innis
- Production companies: Industry Entertainment; Luber Roklin Entertainment; Wonderland Sound and Vision
- Distributed by: Amazon MGM Studios (via Prime Video)
- Release date: November 23, 2026
- Running time: 107 minutes
- Country: United States
- Language: English

Clashing Through the Snow is an upcoming American Christmas comedy film directed by Carlson Young and written by Daniel Mackey and Rebecca Ewing. It stars Christopher Briney, Michelle Randolph, Lukas Gage, Paris Hilton, Julia Fox, and PJ Byrne.

== Cast ==
- Christopher Briney as Ryan Mitchell
- Michelle Randolph as Hannah Hendricks
- Lukas Gage
- Paris Hilton as herself
- Julia Fox as Bianca Hart
- PJ Byrne as Jeremy
- Andrew Schulz as Walter
- Zarna Garg as Gail
- Tan France as Aidan Sullivan

== Production ==
In January 2026, it was announced that Carlson Young would be directing a Christmas comedy film titled Clashing Through the Snow, starring Christopher Briney and Michelle Randolph in the lead roles. Lukas Gage joined the cast in February. Julia Fox was added a month later.

Principal photography began on March 2, 2026, when Paris Hilton joined the cast as a fictionalized version of herself. Shane Hurlbut serves as the cinematographer. PJ Byrne, Andrew Schulz, Zarna Garg, and Tan France also joined the cast.
