= Cassie Randolph =

American television personality (born 1995)

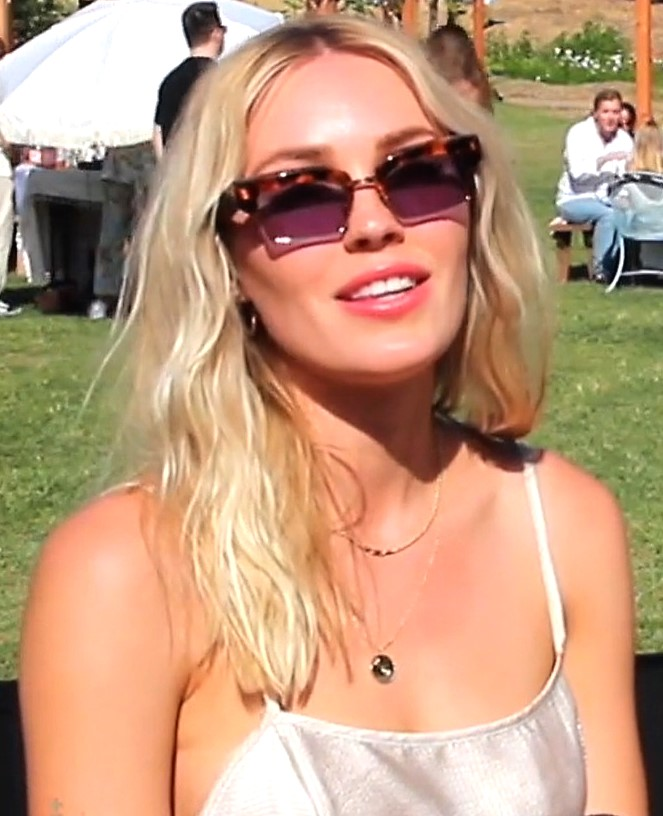
- Randolph in 2022
- Born: Cassandra Ann Randolph; April 27, 1995 (age 31)
- Education: Biola University (BS); University of Wisconsin–Eau Claire (MS)
- Occupations: Television personality, speech pathologist
- Years active: 2016–present
- Television: The Bachelor
- Spouse: Brighton Reinhardt (m. 2025)
- Relatives: Michelle Randolph (sister)

Cassandra Ann Randolph (born April 27, 1995) is an American television personality who came to national prominence in 2019 as the winner of season 23 of The Bachelor, starring Colton Underwood.

== Early life and education ==
Randolph was born to parents Matt Randolph and Amy McCleary. She is the eldest of three siblings; her younger siblings include Michelle, an actress and model signed to Wilhelmina Models, and Landon. Randolph's mother Amy appeared on two episodes of Wheel of Fortune in the 1996-97 taping season while pregnant with Michelle, winning her first episode but losing her second to then-University of Nevada student Jim Holborow. Randolph grew up in Walnut Creek, California, where she graduated from Berean Christian High School; Randolph then attended Biola University, graduating with a degree in communication sciences and disorders in 2016. She then began working as a substitute ESL teacher at the Huntington Beach Union High School District. She graduated with a master's degree in speech pathology from the University of Wisconsin–Eau Claire in 2021.

== Career ==
Randolph began her career in reality television in 2016, appearing in the reality web series Young Once. The series follows Christian students in Southern California studying at Biola University, a conservative evangelical university that enforces abstinence-only rules and bans alcohol and drugs. Season two of the web series began airing at the same time as The Bachelor.

In 2018, Randolph was cast in season 23 of The Bachelor, starring former professional football player Colton Underwood. Filming for the season took place throughout fall 2018, and Randolph was later revealed by ABC as a contestant on December 6, 2018. In the episode which aired on March 4, 2019, Randolph quit the competition after realizing she did not feel ready to become engaged at the end of the season; Randolph breaking up with Underwood caused him to commit the "fence jump", which was heavily reported in the media. Randolph later rejoined the season in the following episode, after Underwood revealed to her that he would not propose and had broken up with other finalists Tayshia Adams and Hannah Godwin to be with her. At the live After the Final Rose special airing on March 12, Underwood and Randolph confirmed that they were in a relationship.

== Personal life ==
Randolph dated Connor Cabral from Berean and then professional basketball player Caelan Tiongson for five years. Randolph was in a relationship with Bachelor star Colton Underwood from November 2018 to May 2020. On September 11, 2020, Randolph filed a restraining order against Underwood, alleging that he stalked her outside her Los Angeles apartment and her parents' Huntington Beach house, that he sent harassing text messages using an anonymous number, and that he installed a tracking device underneath her car. At an October 6 hearing, the restraining order was extended by the judge until further court proceedings on November 6. The same day, Randolph proceeded to file a police report concerning the tracking device installed on her car, alleging that Underwood had planted it.

After four years of dating, on November 25, 2024, Randolph became engaged to musician Brighton Reinhardt. Randolph and Reinhardt got married at The Point Luxury Villa in Tamarindo, Costa Rica, on December 5, 2025.

== Filmography ==
Year	Title	Role	Notes
2023	A Cowboy Christmas Romance	Michelle	Lifetime Movie
2016, 2019	Young Once	Herself	Web series
2019	The Bachelor	Herself	Winner; season 23

Awards and achievements
Preceded by Becca Kufrin	The Bachelor winner Season 23	Succeeded by Hannah Ann Sluss
