= Mike Johnson (The Bachelorette contestant) =

American TV personality (born 1987)

- Born: December 27, 1987 (age 38)
- Occupations: Television personality, portfolio manager

Mike Johnson (born December 27, 1987) is an American television personality and portfolio manager. He received national recognition after appearing as a contestant on season 15 of The Bachelorette before being eliminated by Hannah Brown during week 7 of the show. After being eliminated from The Bachelorette, he began appearing on season 6 of Bachelor in Paradise, but was sent home during the rose ceremony in week 10.

== Personal life ==
Johnson is originally from Grand Prairie, Texas. He is a United States Air Force veteran. Prior to being a television personality, he was a financial adviser. He was being considered to be the bachelor for season 24 but Peter Weber was chosen instead.
