= The Bachelor (American TV series) season 23 =

Season of television series

The Bachelor
- Season 23
- Promotional poster
- Starring: Colton Underwood
- Presented by: Chris Harrison
- No. of contestants: 30
- Winner: Cassie Randolph
- No. of episodes: 12

Release
- Original network: ABC
- Original release: January 7 – March 12, 2019

Additional information
- Filming dates: September 21 – November 15, 2018

Season chronology
- ← Previous; Season 22 Next → Season 24

The twenty-third season of The Bachelor premiered on January 7, 2019. This season features 26-year-old Colton Underwood, a former professional football player and charity founder from Washington, Illinois.

Underwood finished in fourth place on the fourteenth season of The Bachelorette featuring Becca Kufrin, and also appeared on the fifth season of Bachelor in Paradise. The season concluded on March 12, 2019, with Underwood choosing to pursue a relationship with 23-year-old speech pathologist Cassie Randolph. Randolph was the first woman to win in the show's history after quitting in the same season. The couple announced their breakup on May 29, 2020. In September 2020, Randolph filed a restraining order against Underwood, alleging that he stalked her and put a tracking device on her car, but the restraining order was later dropped after the two reached a private agreement.

Underwood publicly came out as gay on April 14, 2021, making him the first lead in franchise history to publicly identify as gay.

== Production ==
=== Casting and contestants ===
On September 4, 2018, during Good Morning America, Underwood was announced as the next Bachelor over Blake Horstmann and Jason Tartick, who are castmates with Underwood in The Bachelorette season 14. Horstmann would go on to be a contestant in season six of Bachelor in Paradise.

Three contestants were first introduced in The Ellen DeGeneres Show on September 20, 2018. On that show, Colton met Annie Reardon, Sydney Lotuaco, and Katie Morton in a game of Know or Go. Annie won the game and got to talk to Colton for longer than Sydney and Katie. The rest of the contestants were later revealed on the official Facebook page by Chris Harrison on December 6, 2018.

Notable contestants include beauty queens Caelynn Miller-Keyes, Hannah Brown and Hannah Godwin competed one against another in various beauty pageants. Miller-Keyes and Brown competed in Miss USA 2018, as Miss North Carolina USA and Miss Alabama USA, respectively; Miller-Keyes was placed as the first runner-up, Godwin had competed against Brown in Miss Alabama USA; and Catherine Agro is the twin sister of America's Next Top Model cycle 20 contestant Alexandra Agro.

=== Filming and development ===
This season featured a visit in Singapore. Besides Singapore, this season also included visits in Thailand, Vietnam, Portugal, the Bachelor's hometown of Denver, Colorado and Spain. The season also had special appearances from husband and wife comedians Megan Mullally and Nick Offerman, actor and comedian Billy Eichner, actor and former professional football player Terry Crews, The Bachelor Vietnam host Khôi Trần and singer Brett Young.

== Contestants ==
This season began with 30 contestants.

Name	Age	Hometown	Occupation	Outcome	Place	Ref
Cassie Randolph	23	Huntington Beach, California	Speech Pathologist	Winner	1	
Hannah Godwin	23	Birmingham, Alabama	Content Creator	Week 9	2	
Tayshia Adams	28	Santa Ana, California	Phlebotomist	Week 9	3	
Cassie Randolph	(Returned to competition)			Week 9	Quit (Note: Randolph originally quit in Week 9, but she returned after she agreed to Underwood's request for another chance.)	
Caelynn Miller-Keyes	23	Fredericksburg, Virginia	Miss North Carolina USA 2018	Week 8	4	
Kirpa Sudick	26	Whittier, California	Dental Hygienist	Week 7	5	
Heather Martin	23	Carlsbad, California	Assistant Program Manager	Week 7	6 (quit)	
Hannah Brown	24	Northport, Alabama	Miss Alabama USA 2018	Week 7	7	
Katie Morton	26	Oviedo, Florida	Medical Sales Representative	Week 6	8	
Demi Burnett	23	Red Oak, Texas	Interior Designer	Week 6	9	
Sydney Lotuaco	27	Virginia Beach, Virginia	NBA Dancer	Week 6	10 (quit)	
Nicole Lopez-Alvar	25	Miami, Florida	Social Media Coordinator	Week 5	11–12	
Onyeka Ehie	24	Manhattan, Kansas	IT Risk Consultant	Week 5	11–12	
Elyse Dehlbom	31	Soldotna, Alaska	Makeup Artist	Week 5	13 (quit)	
Courtney Curtis	23	McDonough, Georgia	Caterer	Week 4	14–15	
Tracy Shapoff	31	Rochester, New York	Wardrobe Stylist	Week 4	14–15	
Brianna "Bri" Barnes	24	Chino Hills, California	Model	Week 3	16–18	
Catherine Agro	26	Fort Lauderdale, Florida	DJ	Week 3	16–18	
Nina Bartula	30	Raleigh, North Carolina	Sales Account Manager	Week 3	16–18	
Caitlin Clemmens	25	Toronto, Ontario	Realtor	Week 3	19	
Alex Blumberg	29	Vancouver, British Columbia	Dog Rescuer	Week 2	20–23	
Angelique Sherman	28	Hamilton, New Jersey	Marketing Salesperson	Week 2	20–23	
Annie Reardon	23	Mequon, Wisconsin	Financial Associate	Week 2	20–23	
Erika McNutt	25	Encinitas, California	Recruiter	Week 2	20–23	
Alex Dillon	23	Dennis, Massachusetts	Sloth	Week 1	24–30	
Devin Gooden	23	Medford, Oregon	Broadcast Journalist	Week 1	24–30	
Erin Landry	28	Plano, Texas	Cinderella	Week 1	24–30	
Adrianne "Jane" Averbukh	26	West Hollywood, California	Social Worker	Week 1	24–30	
Laura Pellerito	26	Dallas, Texas	Accountant	Week 1	24–30	
Revian Chang	24	Plano, Texas	Nurse	Week 1	24–30	
Tahzjuan Hawkins	25	Castle Pines, Colorado	Business Development Associate	Week 1	24–30	

=== Future appearances ===
==== The Bachelorette ====
Hannah Brown was chosen as the lead for season 15 of The Bachelorette.

Tayshia Adams was chosen to replace Clare Crawley as the lead in season 16 of The Bachelorette. Tayshia was named as the interim host for The Bachelorette in seasons 17 and 18 alongside season 11 Bachelorette Kaitlyn Bristowe, replacing Chris Harrison.

==== Bachelor in Paradise ====
Season 6

Hannah Godwin, Tayshia, Caelynn Miller-Keyes, Demi Burnett, Jane Averbukh, Katie Morton, Nicole Lopez-Alvar, Onyeka Ehie, Sydney Lotuaco, Bri Barnes, Caitlin Clemmens, Revian Chang, and Tahzjuan Hawkins returned for season 6 of Bachelor in Paradise. Jane was eliminated in week 1. Onyeka quit in week 2. Caitlin and Tahzjuan were eliminated in week 3. Caelynn left with Dean Unglert in week 5. Sydney and Revian were eliminated in week 5. Bri and Tayshia split from Matt Donald and John Paul Jones, respectively, in week 6. Hannah G., Demi, and Katie ended the season engaged to Dylan Barbour, Kristian Haggerty and Chris Bukowski, respectively.

Season 7

Tahzjuan and Demi returned for season 7 of Bachelor in Paradise. Tahzjuan quit in Week 2. Demi was eliminated in week 3.

==== Bachelor in Paradise Canada ====
Season 1

Caitlin returned for the inaugural season of Bachelor in Paradise Canada. She split from Kamil Nicalek in week 5.

==== Dancing with the Stars ====
Outside of Bachelor Nation franchise, Hannah B. was chosen for the twenty-eighth season of Dancing with the Stars. She went on to win with her partner, Alan Bersten.

==== The Bachelor ====
Hannah B. appeared in two episodes in season 24 of The Bachelor. In addition, Heather Martin attempted to join the cast of season 25 of The Bachelor. Cassie Randolph made a guest appearance during the season 26 finale of The Bachelor. Tahzjuan attempted to join the season 27 cast.

==== Beyond the Edge ====
Colton Underwood competed in the first season of Beyond the Edge where he was crowned the winner.

==== Coming Out Colton ====
In 2021, after publicly coming out as gay, Colton starred in an unscripted, six-episode Netflix documentary series titled Coming Out Colton. In the series, Onyeka made an appearance in the sixth episode.

==== The Masked Singer ====
Colton competed on season eleven of The Masked Singer.

==== The Goat ====
Tayshia appeared on the first season of The Goat.

==== Got to Get Out ====
Demi appeared on the first season of the Hulu show Got to Get Out.

==== Are You My First? ====
Colton co-hosted alongside Kaitlyn Bristowe on a dating reality series titled, Are You My First?, featuring twenty-one virgin singles that premiered on Hulu.

=== The Traitors ===
Colton competed on the fourth season of The Traitors.

== Call-out order ==
Order	Bachelorettes	Week									
Order	Bachelorettes	1	2	3	4	5	6	7	8	9	10
1	Demi	Hannah G.	Elyse	Caelynn	Tayshia	Heather	Hannah G.	Tayshia	Hannah G.	Hannah G.	Cassie
2	Tayshia	Caelynn	Hannah B.	Elyse	Demi	Hannah B.	Tayshia	Caelynn	Tayshia	Tayshia	
3	Heather	Katie	Heather	Nicole	Caelynn	Cassie	Kirpa	Hannah G.	Cassie	Cassie	
4	Nicole	Alex B.	Tayshia	Hannah G.	Hannah G.	Caelynn	Hannah B.	Cassie	Caelynn		
5	Caelynn	Hannah B.	Cassie	Tayshia	Heather	Tayshia	Caelynn	Kirpa			
6	Sydney	Onyeka	Caelynn	Katie	Kirpa	Kirpa	Cassie	Heather			
7	Elyse	Caitlin	Courtney	Cassie	Hannah B.	Demi	Heather	Hannah B.			
8	Tahzjuan	Annie	Demi	Kirpa	Katie	Hannah G.	Katie				
9	Cassie	Kirpa	Nicole	Sydney	Elyse	Katie	Demi				
10	Kirpa	Heather	Kirpa	Demi	Sydney	Sydney	Sydney				
11	Caitlin	Elyse	Hannah G.	Tracy	Cassie	Nicole; Onyeka					
12	Courtney	Tayshia	Catherine	Courtney	Nicole	Nicole; Onyeka					
13	Katie	Courtney	Bri	Heather	Onyeka	Elyse					
14	Alex D.	Cassie	Sydney	Onyeka	Courtney; Tracy						
15	Onyeka	Demi	Onyeka	Hannah B.	Courtney; Tracy						
16	Erika	Nina	Katie	Bri; Catherine; Nina							
17	Hannah B.	Erika	Caitlin	Bri; Catherine; Nina							
18	Tracy	Sydney	Nina	Bri; Catherine; Nina							
19	Angelique	Bri	Tracy	Caitlin							
20	Devin	Angelique	Alex B. Angelique; Annie; Erika								
21	Revian	Tracy	Alex B. Angelique; Annie; Erika								
22	Nina	Nicole	Alex B. Angelique; Annie; Erika								
23	Alex B.	Catherine	Alex B. Angelique; Annie; Erika								
24	Bri	Alex D. Devin; Erin; Jane; Laura; Revian; Tahzjuan									
25	Laura	Alex D. Devin; Erin; Jane; Laura; Revian; Tahzjuan									
26	Hannah G.	Alex D. Devin; Erin; Jane; Laura; Revian; Tahzjuan									
27	Annie	Alex D. Devin; Erin; Jane; Laura; Revian; Tahzjuan									
28	Jane	Alex D. Devin; Erin; Jane; Laura; Revian; Tahzjuan									
29	Catherine	Alex D. Devin; Erin; Jane; Laura; Revian; Tahzjuan									
30	Erin	Alex D. Devin; Erin; Jane; Laura; Revian; Tahzjuan									

The contestant received the first impression rose
The contestant received a rose during the date
The contestant was eliminated
The contestant was eliminated outside the rose ceremony
The contestant was eliminated during the date
The contestant quit the competition
The contestant won the competition

== Episodes ==
No. overall	No. in season	Title	Original release date	Prod. code	U.S. viewers (millions)	Rating/share (18–49)
228	1	"Week 1: Season Premiere"	January 7, 2019	2301	5.13	1.5/6
The season begins with Colton and Chris Harrison discussing people's mixed reactions to him becoming the next Bachelor. Later that night, Colton's journey begins as thirty single ladies arrive at the mansion. Demi steps out of the limo first and mentions she hasn't dated a virgin since she was twelve; Caelynn wears a Miss Underwood sash; Cassie brings a box of fake butterflies; Caitlin pops a balloon to represent popping Colton's cherry; Katie makes a joke about taking Colton's v-card; Alex D. dresses up as a sloth; Tracy arrives in a police car; Nicole, Revian and Nina speak in Spanish, Mandarin and Croatian, respectively; Bri fakes an Australian accent to stand out; Hannah G. presents Colton with an empty box to represent him often not wearing underwear; Catherine brings her dog Lucy for Colton to look after, and Erin arrives in a horse drawn carriage. Once the women are all inside, Demi steals Colton for the first one-on-one conversation of the night. Sydney, an NBA dancer has quit her job, teaches Colton how to dance. Elyse takes Colton fishing in the swimming pool as she is from Alaska, and Tayshia takes Colton to 'Tayshia Land', where small carnival games are set up. Throughout the course of the night, Catherine manages to steal Colton four times from other women, leading Onyeka to confront her. After much thought, Colton gives his first impression rose to Hannah G. At the rose ceremony, Alex D., Devin, Erin, Jane, Laura, Revian and Tahzjuan were sent home.
229	2	"Week 2"	January 14, 2019	2302	5.64	1.7/7
Demi, Bri, Tracy, Elyse, Hannah G., Nicole, Onyeka, and Catherine are chosen for the first group date of this season, where they join Colton at the Regent Theater. Hosted by Megan Mullally and Nick Offerman, the ladies are to perform a comedy on a rememberable "first" experience they've had. Colton shares the story of the first time he admitted he was a virgin to a teammate, while Demi stole the spotlight by kissing Colton in front of the other women. At the after party, Demi continued to rub a few women the wrong way when she picked up and played with the group date rose, but in the end, Elyse receives the group date rose. Hannah B. gets the first one-on-one date for the season on the day of her birthday. She and Colton travel to Vasquez Rocks, where they ride horses until they reach a hot tub. Throughout the date, Colton questions whether he's made the right choice with Hannah as they have many awkward moments on the date. Especially, when Hannah B is enable to make a toast. Later that night, they dine on the deck of the RMS Queen Mary where Hannah opens up to Colton about the pressure she puts on herself to be perfect, and in return, Colton gives her a rose. For the second group date, Alex, Erika, Katie, Caelynn, Sydney, Tayshia, Nina, Kirpa, Caitlin, Courtney, Cassie, and Heather chose to attend "Camp Bachelor", where they are split into two teams of six to compete for an overnight with Colton. Colton himself along with Chris Harrison and Billy Eichner host the event. The red team emerges victorious after they win the deciding round of tug-of-war. During the overnight, Heather reveals to Colton that she too is a virgin, but that she has also never kissed anyone. Due to her admission, Heather receives the group date rose. At the cocktail party, Demi interrupts Colton's conversation with Tracy by wearing a bathrobe and taking him upstairs to her "fantasy closet", where she gives him a massage. At the rose ceremony, Alex B., Angelique, Annie and Erika were eliminated.
230	3	"Week 3"	January 21, 2019	2303	5.95	1.6/6
Chris Harrison drops by the mansion to see how they women have settled into Bachelor life, before dropping off the first group date card. Katie, Heather, Hannah B., Courtney, Kirpa, Tracy, Demi and Caelynn selected for the date meet Colton at Pirate's Dinner Adventure, where they learn to be pirates. After their pirate training, Tracy and Caelynn are chosen to compete against each other to save Colton, who is tied against a pole. Caelynn manages to reach Colton first and rescues him. At the after party, Demi and Tracy continue their bickering from last week, before Demi blindfolds Colton during their one-on-one time and spanks him with a paddle. Hannah B. tells Colton that she and Caelynn used to be friends while competing for Miss USA 2018, but due to a fallout, they are no longer friends. Colton pulls Caelynn aside and Caelynn lets him know that there's things she's wanted him to know, but she was waiting for the right time in their relationship to tell him. From their conversation, Caelynn receives the group date rose. Elyse goes on the one-on-one date for the week, where she and Colton travel via helicopter to Belmont Park in San Diego. Colton turns their date into a group date, by inviting a group of children with cystic fibrosis to hang out with them for the day. During the night portion of their date, Elyse opens up about the death of her sister. Colton gives Elyse a rose, before they go watch Tenille Arts perform. The second group date sees Tayshia, Nina, Catherine, Sydney, Onyeka, Cassie, Nicole and Caitlin compete in a series of events to see who can become the Bachelor's strongest woman. Terry Crews and his wife Rebecca host the competition, while Chris Harrison and Fred Willard provide commentary. Onyeka is crowned the Bachelor's strongest woman. At the after party, Colton sends Caitlin home after failing to find a connection with her. Nicole receives the group date rose. The cocktail party is replaced by a pool party, where Colton continues to deal with Caelynn and Hannah B's resentment for one another. At the rose ceremony, Bri, Catherine and Nina were eliminated.
231	4	"Week 4: Singapore"	January 28, 2019	2304	6.43	1.8/8
Chris Harrison drops by at the mansion to announce that they and Colton would be traveling to somewhere the show has never been before, Singapore. Shortly after arriving in Singapore, Tayshia gets her first one-on-one date. She and Colton walk along the beach on Sentosa island, before they face their fear of heights and go bungee jumping. During the night portion of the date, Tayshia opens up to Colton about her divorce. Colton gives Tayshia a rose and they end their night on the Singapore Flyer. Hannah G., Elyse, Kirpa, Sydney, Heather, Onyeka, Tracy, Nicole, Demi, Courtney, Katie, Cassie, and Hannah B. are on the group date, where they walk through Chinatown and try leech therapy. Colton also has his fortune read with Cassie. The group always tries some Singaporean cuisine including bull frog, pig feet, eel and fish eyes. That night, Hannah B. gets the chance to talk to Colton after what had happened the previous week with Caelynn, and they smooth things over. Demi and Courtney argue over Courtney complaining about not getting time with Colton, when she does not make the effort to go and talk with him. Demi opens up to Colton about her mom being in federal prison, and because she opened up, Demi receives the group date rose. Caelynn gets the second one-on-one date with Colton, where he takes her shopping and they meet with fashion designers Jeffrey Tay at ION Orchard and Lisa Von Tang at The Shoppes at Marina Bay Sands. The night portion takes place at Gardens by the Bay, and Caelynn opens up to Colton about being sexually assaulted in college. Colton shares a story of his ex-girlfriend who also went through a similar experience and how it saddened him to see her like that. Caelynn receives a rose and says she sees herself falling for Colton. During the cocktail party, Demi and Courtney continue to argue after Demi called Courtney the 'cancer of the house' to Colton. Caelynn and Hannah B. sort out their differences and decide to support each other during their journey. At the rose ceremony, Courtney and Tracy were eliminated.
232	5	"Week 5: Thailand"	February 4, 2019	2305	6.23	1.8/8
Colton and the remaining women travel to Khao Lak, Thailand. Heather receives the first one-on-one date, and she and Colton take a traditional Thai boat to Ko Panyi where they explore the markets. During the night part of their date, Heather opens up about how she dated a guy for eight months who had all the qualities she was looking for, but they knew the spark wasn't there between them and they never kissed. Colton gives Heather a rose and afterwards they take a walk along the beach. When fireworks start to go off around them, Colton kisses Heather for the first time. Elyse starts to doubt her connection with Colton, and after Heather returns from her date, she decides to go talk with Colton. Elyse explains that she wants time and attention that a relationship deserves, and that if Colton was to propose to her at the end, she wouldn't be able to accept his proposal. Elyse comes to the decision that she has to leave. The group date has Demi, Caelynn, Hannah B., Sydney, Tayshia, Kirpa, Onyeka, Nicole and Hannah G. headed into the jungle where they meet with Jungle Joe who teaches them some survival techniques. The women are then split into three teams to see who can survive based on some rules Joe gave. Colton steals some time away with Tayshia after joining her group. Demi, Hannah B. and Hannah G. went back to the resort and got burgers, water and champagne. At the after party, Hannah B. tells Colton that she is falling in love with him. Onyeka tells Colton that before Elyse left she told her that Nicole was not here for the right reasons. Colton confronts Nicole and she denied the rumour. Cassie and Colton have their one-on-one and they take a boat to their very own private island across the Andaman Sea. On the night portion of their date at Colton's villa, Cassie opens up about the shame she feels from when her extended family and community find out she's not a virgin. After Cassie receives her rose, Colton lets her into his bed where he tells her that he is crazy about her. At the cocktail party, Tayshia and Colton light a lantern and let it off into the sky. Nicole tells Colton that Onyeka has been bullying her, and after Colton brings the claims up to Onyeka, Onyeka gets into a raised voice argument with Nicole. Colton, who tried to sit in on the argument to hear both sides, gets fed up and walks off by himself along the beach. The episode ends in cliffhanger.
233	6	"Week 6: Vietnam"	February 11, 2019	2306	6.23	1.9/8
The episode concluded with Onyeka and Nicole continued with their bitter argument, Colton walks away to end the drama with the rose ceremony has starting, Onyeka and Nicole are eliminated. Then the show moves on to Nha Trang, Vietnam. Hannah G. has the one-on-one date, she and Colton have gone to a spa to have a massage, rejuvenating therapy, mud bath and a shower with a make out scene. During the night portion of the date, Hannah G. opens up about her parents' divorce, Colton also has his own story that his parents are divorced as well, Hannah G. receives the rose. Demi, Sydney, Katie, Cassie, Hannah B., Tayshia, Caelynn and Heather are selected on this group date, Colton takes them to do the master of Vietnamese martial art called Vovinam at Nhà xưa ông Hai Thái hall. They divide into two teams, the Red team and the Blue team. Chris Harrison and The Bachelor Vietnam host Khôi Trần have provided judging and commentary. After the Blue team seal their victory, Colton announced both teams will have an after party later in the night at The Anam. During the night portion, Sydney becomes frustrated that she doesn't have much time with Colton where she isn't going a will for love, Sydney decides to leave. Sydney also warns Colton that some of the girls are not ready to be married. Demi tells Colton about her mom being released from prison where she called her on a mobile phone to talk with Colton that they should allow to meet on a possible hometown date, Demi is proud on her mom that she is very close to her. In the end, Tayshia receives the group date rose. Kirpa gets the second one-on-one date for the week, she and Colton have riding on a sampan to a boat where they've caught sea urchins to give a toast. During the night portion, Kirpa tells Colton on her previous engagement where they did not last long, Colton gives a rose to Kirpa. After Kirpa returned to the villa, Demi goes to Colton's room to have a conversation that she has a much difficult time whether she is regretting about the relationship that she decides to move on and she has sent home. Demi, also warns Colton that some of the girls are not ready to be married or for the type of relationship he is searching for. The next day, Chris appears in the villa to tell the girls that the cocktail party has cancelled and will go straight to the rose ceremony. At the rose ceremony, Katie has sent home and she again warns him that some of the remaining girls are not ready or here for the right reasons. Colton becomes frustrated that three women have warned him that some girls are not on the show for the right reasons and is determined to get to the bottom of this.
234	7	"Week 7: Denver, Colorado"	February 18, 2019	2307	6.54	1.9/8
After a tearful drama in Vietnam, Colton expresses his outcome on Sydney, Demi and Katie's eliminations, then he opens up his mind on the potential heartbreak to the remaining women. He and the women traveled to Denver, Colorado, Colton met with season twenty Bachelor Ben Higgins in Downtown Denver to receive advice from him. Later that day, Tayshia gets a one-on-one with Colton to explore the sights of LoDo district along with Colton's dog Sniper where they buy three pieces of salmon at Denver Milk Market and have a drink at Denver Union Station. While having a drink, Colton asks for Tayshia's opinion on the warning he received from Sydney, Demi and Katie. Tayshia states that she doesn't want to name names, but goes on to state that she heard that Caelynn and Cassie were discussing to become the next Bachelorette and life after the show; also stating that Caelynn and Cassie stated they weren't ready to be engaged at the end of the show. In the night portion of the date, they cook dinner for themselves at his apartment. Tayshia received the rose. Caelynn gets the second one-on-one date to travel across the Rockies by taking her to snowboard at Loveland Ski Area, Colton teaches her a snowboard lesson as Caelynn stumbles. In the night portion of the date at The Fort, Caelynn discusses the situation between Tayshia and Kirpa and she explains her intentions are to get engaged as well. Caelynn also states that she is in love with Colton. She receives a rose as well and they end up at Red Rocks Amphitheatre with Brett Young who serenades the couple. Hannah B. has the final one-on-one date of this season as she and Colton travel to Parker to meet with Colton's divorced parents, Scott and Donna and their spouses. Colton's mom likes Hannah B's willingness to get married and Colton's dad advises Colton to go with his gut in making decisions. In the night portion of the date, the two go to Wings Over the Rockies Air and Space Museum for dinner. Colton feels that he is not "quite there" with Hannah B. and asks to walk Hannah B. out, leaving heartbroken and in tears. Hannah G., Kirpa, Cassie, and Heather are chosen for the final group date of the season in the Rockies where they hear a historic Georgetown Loop Railroad train as Colton conducts the train to accompany them into the sheer ravine. Heather tells Colton that she isn't ready to bring Colton to meet her family, and she leaves the competition. Cassie and Kirpa begin bickering about the rumors about Cassie and Caelynn. Colton decides he can’t make a decision yet on the final two roses and the remaining 3 women go to Grant–Humphreys Mansion to have dinner later that night. Colton gives out the first rose to Hannah G. early on, and then has conversations with Kirpa and Cassie. Caelynn sneaks out of the mansion to meet with Colton and tells him that he shouldn’t send someone home that he has a connection with because of gossip. At the end of the date, Cassie gets the final rose and Kirpa is sent home. Colton and Cassie pop open a bottle of champagne and toast to close the night.
235	8	"Week 8: Hometowns"	February 25, 2019	2308	6.74	1.8/8
Colton begins the hometown date at Fredericksburg, Virginia to meet with Caelynn as they stopped by with a horse-drawn carriage ride into the streets of historic downtown. They stop at Caelynn's favorite place for ice cream and then discuss her situation with her biological father. Caelynn states that she has no contact with him and views her stepfather, John as her father because he raised her. Later that day, Caelynn introduces Colton to her stepfather, mother and a sister as well as additional family members for an early dinner party. Caelynn's sister and Caelynn discuss her one-on-one and Caelynn revealing that she is a sexual assault survivor. Caelynn also discusses with John about how much he means to her and how grateful she is have him in her life. Caelynn states at the end of the date that she is in love with Colton. The next stop is Birmingham, Alabama with Hannah G. where she and Colton take an etiquette class, the etiquette teacher gives him a proper Southern look, Hannah G. later claims him "to be a Southern gentleman". When Colton meets Hannah G's parents, he felt overwhelmed as Hannah's cousin and three best friends discuss Colton's virginity. Hannah G's mother is unsure and not use to seeing Hannah G. in this situation. At the end of the date Hannah G. tells Colton she is in love with him. Then, Colton goes to Santa Ana, California to meet with Tayshia at the car park; he instructs her to blindfold and drives to a secret location: an aerodrome where they're faced with skydiving. Both are petrified of heights. Into the Southern California skyline they jump. Tayshia gives her concern to Colton about her previous marriage: as Colton met her family, especially her father Desmond, the father asked Tayshia's youngest brother Brice if she would get married again. Desmond told about her regretting the previous relationship, stating that she would have another shot at love. Tayshia's father is very hesitant with Colton. The last stop for the hometown date is Huntington Beach, California, Cassie surprises Colton for a surf lesson, Cassie instructs him to do complementary surfing techniques whereas Colton stumbled down onto the shore. Cassie and her sister Michelle discuss her relationship and her feelings for Colton. They also discuss if Cassie is ready to say she is in love with Colton. Cassie's dad Matt is very skeptical because Colton is dating three other women as well. Cassie does not tell Colton that she loves him at the end of the date. At the date, when Colton accepts the blessing from the father, Matt does not give his blessing, as she claims marriage is a big deal and because Colton is still dating three other women. At the rose ceremony, Caelynn is sent home and on her walk out tears flow. At the end of the episode, Colton talks to Chris Harrison about virginity and the fantasy suites to find out the following episode.
236	9	"Week 9: Fantasy Suites"	March 4, 2019	2309	7.28	2.0/8
Concluded from the previous episode, Chris Harrison and Colton discuss their previous awkward conversation about Fantasy Suites during Becca's season and discuss moving forward with this week and the fantasy suites. Harrison motivates Colton, Colton asks the girls to travel to Algarve, Portugal on the overnight dates. In Portugal, Tayshia gets the first date with Colton in a helicopter ride to Cape Saint Vincent Lighthouse in Sagres where they set up a picnic and explore the scenic view of Portuguese oceanside. That night during the dinner, Tayshia opens up about her ex-husband cheating on her during their marriage which ultimately led to their divorce. Tayshia explains that she wants a better marriage and Colton assures her that if she is the one that he would never cheat on her. Tayshia accepts the fantasy suite where Colton attempts to pop up a bottle of champagne as disaster struck when the champagne spilled out onto a couch. In the morning after the Fantasy suite, Tayshia and Colton reveal that they did not have sex, but did get to know one another better without the cameras. Cassie meets with Colton to travel to the town of Tavira where they have sightseeing in the community by eating lunch, shopping for clothes and participate in a Portuguese folk dance with elderly people as they persuade to dance with each elders. They later kissed at the center of old town. Cassie discusses her hometown with Colton and Colton reveals that Cassie's father did not give his blessing to Colton. Cassie is shocked by this and does not know what to think of this, because her family's opinion of Colton is very important to her. While getting ready for the evening portion of the date Cassie's father shows up at her hotel, Matt has a conversation with Cassie about her relationship with Colton and if she really wants to get engaged. Cassie feels unsure about getting engaged and has a lot of hesitation as to whether she is ready to be engaged. Later that night, Colton feels ready to be intimate with Cassie and is looking forward to professing his love for her. When Cassie arrives she tells him about the conversation with her father in which she mentioned she has doubts about the relationship between herself and Colton. Cassie does state that she does love Colton but is not ready to be engaged. Colton tells Cassie that she is the one that he wants to be with and he will end the show now so they can be together. Cassie feels deeply emotional and sorrowed with the thought of leaving. Cassie tells Colton about her father's feelings about him and stated that she wants to end abruptly that she is not ready for an engagement. Cassie leaves purely devastated, heartbroken, and in tears. Shortly thereafter, Colton is done when he returns to the hotel saying, "Fuck all of this, I'm done, I'm done with this." He then punches the camera when he walks away and jumps over the fence of a closed gate. Chris and the producers begun searching for Colton and they end with Chris saying Colton has gone into the countryside. The episode ends in a cliffhanger.
237	10	"The Women Tell All"	March 5, 2019	N/A	6.09	1.6/7
Twenty of the twenty-seven eliminated women were in the audience. Several of the contestants spoke of their lives after the competition. They repeated the events such as Demi and Courtney arguing, as well as Onyeka bullying Nicole. Katie and Caelynn discuss the conversation between Caelynn and Cassie about becoming the next Bacherlotte. Then, Courtney asked on Demi's immaturity that caused the latter's attitude and perseverance. Demi tells her story recollecting her mother's release from prison—that she remains very close to her as she lives far from her hometown. Nicole consoles on her tears and emotions when she cries that she has never missed her family before, as sometimes she takes care of her autistic brother. Chris Harrison offered her a one-year supply from Halo Top Creamery to receive free ice cream. Hannah B and Chris discuss her journey on the show and Chris gives her another chance to make a toast. Then Chris and Hannah give a champagne toast to reminisce with love. Caelynn goes next to discuss the heartbreak and how unexpected her elimination was. Chris commends Caelynn for bringing up her sexual assault and how brave she truly is. Colton gets the hot seat: Chris explains to him about the fence jump, and Colton said that the producers are looking for him and that it made it too difficult to search. He later joins the women. Demi calls him "Coco", to have a planned fantasy suite; Sydney asks him if he's still a virgin; and Colton knows that he is likely to remain a virgin. Then, the bloopers are shown, Colton saying "nailed it" many times.
238	11	"Week 10: Season Finale"	March 11, 2019	2310A	8.12	2.3/10
Conclusion of the previous episode. Starts with a replay of Colton jumping the fence. Chris Harrison frantically searches for Colton in the Portuguese countryside. Chris and the producers search through the night until they finally find Colton walking on a street and give him a ride back to the hotel. The next day, Chris goes to Colton's hotel room to discuss his heartbreak, and Colton explains to Chris that he declared his love to Cassie. The decision moves forward later in the day when Colton goes to see Tayshia in her hotel room and tells her that he is more in love with Cassie than with her. Tayshia says goodbye to Colton and ends up consoling him when he breaks down in tears. In the hot seat, Tayshia explains to Chris how devastated she was by the breakup. Colton joins her and they recall their time together on dates like bungee jumping in Singapore, traditional Thai Loi Krathong, and skydiving in her hometown. Then, back to Hannah G. in her hotel room, writing precious memories in her journal. Colton comes to have a talk. They talk about their first meeting and an awareness that was in their hearts, and Hannah learns from Colton about his romance with Cassie. Colton leaves the room and breaks down in tears. A producer asks, "Are You Okay?", and Colton explains he feels blindsided and that he can't believe three ladies have been eliminated in Portugal, making him single once again. Hannah appears in the studio with Chris to talk about the devastating heartbreak. Former Bachelor Ben Higgins and Colton's The Bachelorette castmates Jason Tartick, Garrett Yrigoyen, and Blake Horstmann join Chris to discuss the heartbreak and emotional blindside. At the end of the episode, Colton explains that he's not done yet and wants to try again with Cassie as he enters her hotel—as she is already set to leave Portugal, knocking on her door and continuing into the second part of the finale.
239	12	"After the Final Rose"	March 12, 2019	2310B	8.21	2.4/11
Concluded from the first part, Colton knocked on Cassie's hotel room door and they had a conversation and he asks her to give him a second chance in which Cassie accepts what is on Colton's mind as he told Cassie to end their bad encounters in Portugal and travel to Spain. Colton arrives in the Spanish island of Mallorca, where he became a little nervous to see his family and shared his feelings about virginity. Instead of having two women, only one woman would meet the parents. When Cassie comes along outside the villa, Colton stops by to see her and express with their doubts as until Cassie meets with Colton's family that she has the likeliness on the conversation with Colton's divorced parents. Colton surprises Cassie for a last chance date to go to the cliffs by rappelling down into the ground below for a picnic. Later that night, Cassie tells Colton about on her previous relationship when she was in college that was not getting along as stated she and her ex-boyfriend were very close friends. Cassie says she's all in. Cassie accepts the fantasy suite and Colton kicks the camera crew out, before Cassie says they're mic'd. The morning after the overnight date, Colton and Cassie surprised with a huge soul on their passionate romance. The final rose ceremony was omitted from the broadcast and went unaired. (Note: A promotional photo of the final rose ceremony could be seen on the ABC website before the broadcast of the finale.) As the couple are in the audience, they watched their lives after the filming as they've became super close, Colton revealed that he has already moved to Los Angeles as close with Cassie. Chris Harrison gives them a formal on-studio "Final Rose Ceremony" with a stage: Colton gives the final rose to Cassie and Air Supply are on the stage as well, singing "Making Love Out of Nothing at All" to serenade the couple. Then, the announcement of the next Bachelorette is made and Chris named Hannah B. as the next star: she begins her journey, meeting five men for the first time. Before it ends, Hannah B. gives a rose to one of the future contestants that wouldn't air until that actual series.

== Controversies ==
=== Tracy Shapoff Twitter content ===
Shortly after the announcement of this season's contestants, one of the contestants, Tracy Shapoff, came under fire for her offensive posts on Twitter, bashing reality dating shows and using offensive language, dating back from 2009 to 2011. Shapoff later apologized for her comments on Instagram.
