= Demi Burnett =

American television personality (born 1995)

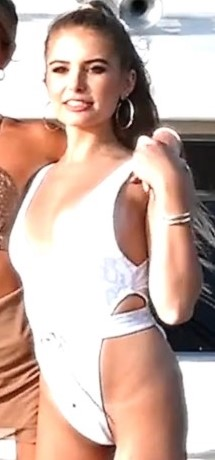
- Burnett on a yacht in 2019
- Born: February 21, 1995 (age 31); Red Oak, Texas
- Education: Texas State University
- Occupation: Television personality

Demi Gabrielle Elizabeth Burnett (born February 21, 1995) is an American television personality. She received national recognition after appearing as a contestant on season 23 of The Bachelor, but she was eliminated by Colton Underwood during week 6 of the show. After being eliminated from the show, she appeared on season six of Bachelor in Paradise in August 2019. She was also a guest star on season 15 of The Bachelorette. In 2021, Burnett returned to reality television for season seven of Bachelor in Paradise.

== Personal life ==
While Burnett was filming The Bachelor, her mother Tina was serving a prison sentence for conspiracy to commit bank fraud. During the first episode of Bachelor in Paradise, she revealed that she had been "casually dating a woman". The woman, Kristian Haggerty, made a surprise appearance and ended up joining the show to continue her relationship on screen with Burnett in Paradise. This would make the couple the franchise's first same-sex on air relationship. During the season finale, Burnett and Haggerty got engaged. In September 2019, she appeared on The Ellen DeGeneres Show, where she stated "she was afraid to come out not only on national television, but to people she knew in real life, too". In October 2019, Burnett and Kristian Haggerty ended their relationship. In January 2020, she appeared on episode three of season 24 of The Bachelor to host a group date for the contestants fighting to win over bachelor Peter Weber.

In February 2022, Burnett revealed she was diagnosed with autism spectrum disorder and prefers being referred to as "autistic".

== Filmography ==
Demi Burnett filmography
Year	Show	Notes
2019	The Bachelor 23	Contestant, 9th place
2019	The Bachelorette 15	Guest appearance
2019	Bachelor in Paradise 6	Contestant
2019	Dancing with the Stars	Cameo appearance
2020	The Bachelor 24	Guest appearance
2020	WWE Raw	Guest appearances
2021	The Celebrity Dating Game	Celebrity contestant
2021	Bachelor in Paradise 7	Contestant
2023	Bachelor in Paradise Canada 2	Guest appearance (2 episodes)
2024	The Bachelor 28	Guest appearance
2025	Got to Get Out	Contestant
2025	Pop the Balloon Live	Celebrity contestant
