= Colton Underwood =

American television personality & football player (born 1992)

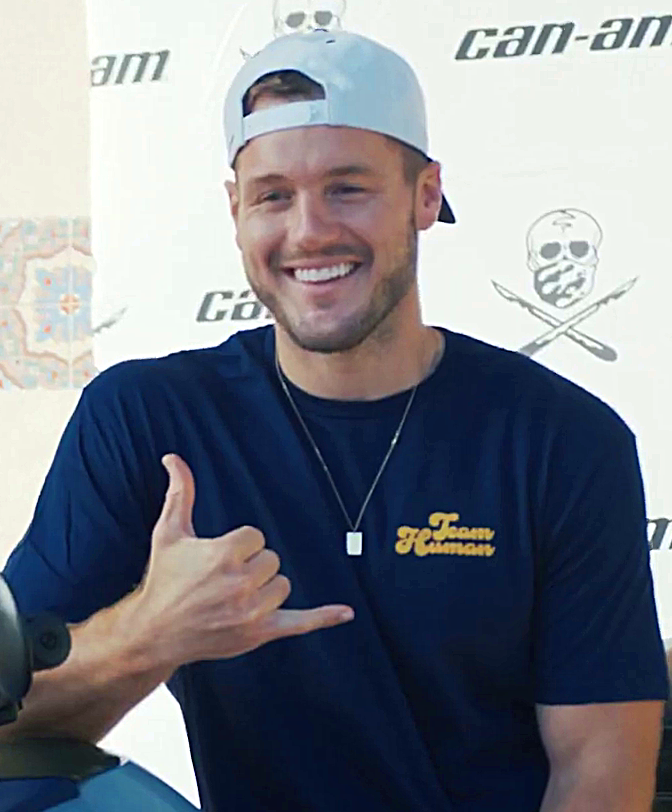
- Underwood in 2023

No. 35, 88
- Position: Defensive end

Personal information
- Born: January 26, 1992 (age 34); Indianapolis, Indiana, U.S.
- Listed height: 6 ft 3 in (1.91 m)
- Listed weight: 254 lb (115 kg)

Career information
- High school: Washington Community (Washington, Illinois)
- College: Illinois State (2010–2013)
- NFL draft: 2014: undrafted

Career history
- San Diego Chargers (2014)*; Philadelphia Eagles (2014)*; San Diego Chargers (2014–2015)*; Oakland Raiders (2015–2016)*
- * Offseason or practice squad member only
- Stats at Pro Football Reference

Colton Scott Brown-Underwood (né Underwood; born January 26, 1992) is an American reality television personality and former professional football player. He played defensive end at Illinois State and was signed by the San Diego Chargers as an undrafted free agent in 2014, and was on the practice squads of the Oakland Raiders and Philadelphia Eagles. After being released by the Raiders, Underwood became a contestant on the 14th season of The Bachelorette, and was then announced as the lead of the 23rd season of The Bachelor. He is the first lead in Bachelor franchise history to come out as gay.

== Early life and education ==
Brown-Underwood was born in Indianapolis, Indiana, to Scott and Donna Underwood. Both of his parents were star athletes at Illinois State University: Scott played college football for the Illinois State Redbirds and Donna played volleyball. Scott and Colton both attended Washington Community High School; Colton graduated in 2010. Colton has a younger brother named Connor. He was raised as Catholic.

Colton Underwood graduated from Illinois State University, where he followed his father's footsteps to play college football for the Redbirds.

== Career ==
=== Football ===
Pre-draft measurables
Height	Weight	Arm length	Hand span	Wingspan	40-yard dash	10-yard split	20-yard split	20-yard shuttle	Three-cone drill	Vertical jump	Broad jump	Bench press
6 ft 3 in (1.91 m)	254 lb (115 kg)	31 5/8 in (0.80 m)	9 1/8 in (0.23 m)	6 ft 4 1/2 in (1.94 m)	4.69 s	1.60 s	2.61 s	4.43 s	7.10 s	36.0 in (0.91 m)	10 ft 0 in (3.05 m)	26 reps
All values from Pro Day

On May 10, 2014, Brown-Underwood was signed as an undrafted free agent by the San Diego Chargers. On August 30, he was waived. On September 3, Underwood was signed to the Philadelphia Eagles' practice squad. On September 9, he was released from practice squad.

On September 23, 2014, Brown-Underwood returned to the Chargers and was signed to their practice squad. On December 29, he signed a future contract. On September 5, 2015, Underwood was waived by San Diego. On September 6, he was placed on injured reserve. On September 10, Underwood was waived from injured reserve.

On December 1, 2015, Underwood was signed to the Oakland Raiders' practice squad. On August 29, 2016, he was released by the Raiders.

=== Reality television ===
Brown-Underwood was a contestant on the 14th season of The Bachelorette, starring Becca Kufrin.

After getting eliminated in week 8 after hometown dates, Underwood was cast in season 5 of Bachelor in Paradise. After being linked to fellow contestant Tia Booth, Underwood broke up with her, and both left Paradise separately in the fourth week.

On September 4, 2018, ABC announced that Brown-Underwood would star in the 23rd season of The Bachelor. The announcement received mixed reactions on social media. On September 21, 2018, ABC announced that Colton had started filming The Bachelor and had already met three of his contestants on The Ellen DeGeneres Show.

On April 14, 2021, Variety reported that Brown-Underwood was in production for his own unscripted series at Netflix. The six-episode series produced by Jeff Jenkins, Coming Out Colton, premiered on Netflix on December 3, 2021. In the series, he meets with other openly gay public figures, including Gus Kenworthy, Michael Sam, and CMT host Cody Alan. The series premiered to major criticism with Esquire describing the series as "calculated" and Variety's Daniel D'Addario saying "'Coming Out Colton' is a distasteful extension of a brand that doesn’t mean much to begin with."

In 2024, Brown-Underwood competed in season eleven of The Masked Singer as "Lovebird". He was eliminated on "Transformers Night" alongside DeMarcus Ware as "Koala".

On August 18, 2025, Brown-Underwood co-hosted alongside Kaitlyn Bristowe on a dating reality series titled, Are You My First? Featuring twenty-one virgin singles that premiered on Hulu.

=== Philanthropy ===
In January 2016, Brown-Underwood founded the Colton Underwood Legacy Foundation to raise money for cystic fibrosis research and medical equipment. Brown-Underwood started the foundation after his cousin Harper was diagnosed with the disease. In January 2018, the foundation began the Legacy Project, with the goal of delivering AffloVests, chest wall oscillation devices which clear excess mucus from lung airways as part of the daily treatment for cystic fibrosis, to children in 50 US states.

== Personal life ==
From 2016 to 2017, Brown-Underwood dated gymnast Aly Raisman after he asked her out in a video.

Brown-Underwood has spoken publicly about his choice to remain a virgin, and how appearing on The Bachelorette helped him discuss the topic. He began dating speech pathology student Cassie Randolph after meeting her on season 23 of The Bachelor. When Randolph initially ended their relationship during the final three, Underwood broke up with the other two women and asked Randolph for a second chance without the pressure of an engagement. Underwood and Randolph were in a relationship from November 2018 until May 2020.

In September 2020, Randolph filed a restraining order against Underwood, alleging that he stalked her outside her Los Angeles apartment and her parents' Huntington Beach house, sent harassing text messages using an anonymous number, and installed a tracking device underneath her car. Randolph was granted a temporary restraining order against Underwood ahead of the October hearing. Randolph dropped the restraining order in November, and Underwood stated "I do not believe Cassie did anything wrong in filing for the restraining orders and also believe she acted in good faith."

He identifies himself as a Christian.

=== Coming out ===
On April 14, 2021, Underwood publicly came out as gay in an interview with Robin Roberts on Good Morning America, making him the first lead in the Bachelor franchise to come out as gay.

In an interview with Variety, Underwood stated that he was blackmailed into coming out. An anonymous man, claiming to be a fan, took a picture of Underwood nude at a gay sauna in Los Angeles in 2019. The man sent Underwood an email threatening to out him to the press. Underwood forwarded the email to his publicist, and this caused him to come out publicly. During the interview, Underwood also stated that he experimented with men before appearing on The Bachelor franchise, stating he used the dating app Grindr under an alias from 2016 to 2017.

In June 2026, he revealed that during his closeted years, he only hooked up with married "straight" men to "protect myself [...] because they had more to lose than I did".

=== Marriage and family ===
Underwood was reported to be dating Democratic strategist Jordan C. Brown in September 2021, after the two were spotted vacationing together in Hawaii, subsequently confirmed in December 2021 in a birthday post for Brown. Underwood later confirmed that he and Brown had gotten engaged shortly after his 30th birthday in January 2022. The two married on May 13, 2023.

In an interview with Men's Health magazine in May 2024, Underwood and his husband announced they were expecting a baby, via egg donor and surrogate. Their son Bishop was born September 26, 2024.

== Filmography ==
=== Television ===
Year	Title	Notes
2018	The Bachelorette	Season 14
2018	Bachelor in Paradise	Season 5
2019	The Bachelor	Season 23
2019	Extra	Guest correspondent
2021	Coming Out Colton	6 episodes
2022	Beyond the Edge	10 episodes
2024	The Masked Singer	Season 11
2025	Are You My First?	10 episodes
2026	The Traitors	Season 4

=== Music video ===
Year	Title	Role	Artist
2019	"Famous"	Actor	Adam Doleac

== Awards and nominations ==
Year	Ceremony	Category	Nominated work	Result	Ref
2019	Reality TV Awards	Fan Favorites	Colton Underwood	Won	
2019	MTV Movie & TV Awards	Most Meme-able Moment	Colton Underwood jumps the fence	Won	
2019	People's Choice Awards	Competition Contestant of 2019	Colton Underwood	Nominated	

== Books ==
- The First Time: Finding Myself and Looking for Love on Reality TV (Gallery Books, 2020). ISBN 978-1982139384.

== See also ==
- Homosexuality in American football
- Homosexuality in modern sports
- Homosexuality in sports in the United States

Preceded by Arie Luyendyk Jr.	The Bachelor; Season 23	Succeeded by Peter Weber
