= Bachelor in Paradise (American TV series) season 8 =

Bachelor in Paradise
- Season 8
- Promotional poster
- No. of episodes: 16

Release
- Original network: ABC
- Original release: September 27 – November 22, 2022

Season chronology
- ← Previous; Season 7 Next → Season 9

The eighth season of Bachelor in Paradise premiered on September 27, 2022. In May 2022, Jesse Palmer was announced as the host.

== Production ==
As with the previous season, filming took place in the town of Sayulita, located in Vallarta-Nayarit, Mexico. This marked the first season not to premiere in the usual summer schedule.

After the second rose ceremony, a twist similar to Casa Amor from Love Island was introduced. The men and women were separated by gender and each introduced to a new group of the opposite sex - after several days, they had to decide whether to bring a new person back to Paradise, or return alone in the hopes of reconnecting with their original partner.

=== Casting ===
On May 17, 2022, Jesse Palmer became the new host of the series, replacing long-time host Chris Harrison; and Wells Adams was confirmed to be returning as the bartender for the fifth season in a row.

On August 26, 2022, the first 19 contestants were revealed.

On August 29, 2022, Victoria Fuller was announced as a contestant during the Bachelorette season 19 Men Tell All special, although she did not arrive on the first day.

On September 6, 2022, Johnny DePhillipo was announced as a contestant after his elimination on The Bachelorette.

This season featured two contestants from the Australian Bachelor franchise - Florence Moerenhout from The Bachelor Australia 5 and Bachelor in Paradise Australia, and Adam Todd from The Bachelorette Australia 6. This was the first time that international contestants have appeared in the American franchise since season 5.

== Contestants ==
Name	Age	Residence	From	Arrived	Outcome
Brandon Jones	27	Portland, Oregon	The Bachelorette – Michelle	Week 1	Engaged
Serene Russell	27	Oklahoma City, Oklahoma	The Bachelor – Clayton	Week 1	Engaged
Johnny DePhillipo	25	Palm Beach Gardens, Florida	The Bachelorette – Rachel R. & Gabby	Week 1	Engaged
Victoria Fuller	28	Nashville, Tennessee	The Bachelor – Peter	Week 1	Engaged
Michael Allio	38	Akron, Ohio	The Bachelorette – Katie	Week 1	Relationship
Danielle Maltby	36	Nashville, Tennessee	The Bachelor – Nick; Bachelor in Paradise – Season 4	Week 2	Relationship
Tyler Norris	25	Rio Grande, New Jersey	The Bachelorette – Rachel R. & Gabby	Week 3	Relationship
Brittany Galvin	25	Chicago, Illinois	The Bachelor – Matt	Week 1	Relationship
Aaron Clancy	27	San Diego, California	The Bachelorette – Katie; Bachelor in Paradise – Season 7	Week 2	Split Week 6
Genevieve Parisi	27	Los Angeles, California	The Bachelor – Clayton	Week 1	Split Week 6
Justin Young	24	Brookfield, Connecticut	The Bachelorette – Rachel R. & Gabby	Week 4	Split Week 6
Florence Moerenhout	32	Melbourne, Victoria	The Bachelor Australia – Matty; Bachelor in Paradise Australia – Season 1 Bachelor in Paradise Australia – Season 2	Week 3	Split Week 6
Joey Young	24	Brookfield, Connecticut	The Bachelorette – Rachel R. & Gabby	Week 4	Split Week 6
Shanae Ankney	30	Sycamore, Ohio	The Bachelor – Clayton	Week 1	Split Week 6
Logan Palmer	26	San Diego, California	The Bachelorette – Rachel R. & Gabby	Week 1	Split Week 5
Kate Gallivan	33	Lake Hollywood, California	The Bachelor – Clayton	Week 3	Split Week 5
Mara Agrait	33	Cherry Hill, New Jersey	The Bachelor – Clayton	Week 5	Week 5 (Quit)
Ency Abedin	29	New York City, New York	The Bachelor – Clayton	Week 5	Week 5 (Quit)
Andrew Spencer	27	Chicago, Illinois	The Bachelorette – Katie	Week 1	Week 5 (Quit)
Jessenia Cruz	29	San Antonio, Texas	The Bachelor – Matt; Bachelor in Paradise – Season 7	Week 3	Week 5 (Quit)
Lyndsey Windham	28	Houston, Texas	The Bachelor – Clayton	Week 5	Week 5 (Quit)
Rodney Mathews	30	Rancho Cucamonga, California	The Bachelorette – Michelle	Week 2	Split Week 5
Eliza Isichei	26	Los Angeles, California	The Bachelor – Clayton	Week 3	Split Week 5
Alex Bordyukov	33	Detroit, Michigan	The Bachelorette – Rachel L. Bachelor in Paradise Australia – Season 2 Bachelor in Paradise Canada – Season 1	Week 3	Week 4
Hayden Markowitz	29	Savannah, Georgia	The Bachelorette – Rachel R. & Gabby	Week 4	Week 4
Jacob Rapini	27	Scottsdale, Arizona	The Bachelorette – Rachel R. & Gabby	Week 1	Week 4 (Note: Jacob asked Jill on a date at the reunion, but they decided not to pursue a relationship.)
Justin Glaze	28	Baltimore, Maryland	The Bachelorette – Katie	Week 1 Week 4 (Returned)	Week 2 Week 4
Adam Todd	25	Perth, Western Australia	The Bachelorette Australia – Becky & Elly	Week 3	Week 3
Sarah Hamrick	24	New York City, New York	The Bachelor – Clayton	Week 3	Week 3 (Quit) (Note: Sarah left the competition due to the death of her grandmother.)
Jill Chin	26	Scituate, Rhode Island	The Bachelor – Clayton	Week 1	Week 3 (Quit)
Olu Onajide	29	Newark, New Jersey	The Bachelorette – Michelle	Week 3	Week 3
Rick Leach	33	Munroe Falls, Ohio	The Bachelorette – Michelle	Week 3	Week 3
Lace Morris	32	Denver, Colorado	The Bachelor – Ben H. Bachelor in Paradise – Season 3	Week 1	Week 3 (Quit)
James Bonsall	32	San Diego, California	The Bachelorette – Katie; Bachelor in Paradise – Season 7	Week 2	Week 2
Peter Izzo	27	Port St. Joe, Florida	The Bachelorette – Michelle	Week 2	Week 2 (Quit)
Casey Woods	37	Parkland, Florida	The Bachelorette – Michelle	Week 1	Week 2 (MD)
Romeo Alexander	32	New York City, New York	The Bachelorette – Michelle	Week 1	Relationship Week 2
Kira Mengistu	33	Philadelphia, Pennsylvania	The Bachelor – Clayton	Week 1 Week 2 (Returned)	Week 1 Relationship Week 2
Salley Carson	27	Greenville, South Carolina	The Bachelor – Clayton (Note: Salley was originally cast in Clayton's season, but dropped out of the show hours before the limo arrivals.)	Week 2	Week 2 (Quit)
Sierra Jackson	26	Dallas, Texas	The Bachelor – Clayton	Week 1	Week 2 (Quit)
Teddi Wright	25	Redlands, California	The Bachelor – Clayton	Week 1	Week 2 (Quit)
Hailey Malles	26	Orlando, Florida	The Bachelor – Clayton	Week 1	Week 1
Hunter Haag	29	Charlotte, North Carolina	The Bachelor – Clayton	Week 1	Week 1

== Elimination table ==
Place	Contestant	Week					
Place	Contestant	1	2	3	4	5	6
1-4	Brandon	In	Date	In	In	In	Engaged
1-4	Serene	In	Date	In	In	In	Engaged
1-4	Johnny	In	In	In	Date	In	Engaged
1-4	Victoria	Date	In	Date	Date	In	Engaged
5-8	Michael	In	Last	Date	In	Date	Relationship
5-8	Danielle	Wait	In	Date	In	Date	Relationship
5-8	Tyler	Wait		Date	In	Date	Relationship
5-8	Brittany	In	Date	In	In	Date	Relationship
9-10	Aaron	Wait	Date	In	In	In	Split
9-10	Genevieve	In	Date	In	In	In	Split
11-12	Justin Y.	Wait			Date	Date	Split
11-12	Florence	Wait		In	Date	In	Split
13-14	Joey	Wait			Date	In	Split
13-14	Shanae	Date	Date	Date	Date	Last	Split
15-16	Logan	Date	In	Date	In	Split	
15-16	Kate	Wait		Date	Date	Split	
17	Mara	Wait				Quit	
18	Ency	Wait				Quit	
19	Andrew	Date	In	In	In	Quit	
20	Jessenia	Wait		In	In	Quit	
21	Lyndsey	Wait				Quit	
22-23	Rodney	Wait	In	Date	Last	Split	
22-23	Eliza	Wait		Date	Date	Split	
24-27	Alex	Wait		Last	Out		
24-27	Hayden	Wait			Out		
24-27	Jacob	In	Date	In	Out		
24-27	Justin G.	Date	Out		Out		
28	Adam	Wait		Out			
29	Sarah	Wait		Quit			
30	Jill	Last	Date	Quit			
31-32	Olu	Wait		Out			
31-32	Rick	Wait		Out			
33	Lace	In	In	Quit			
34	James	Wait	Out				
35	Peter	Wait	Quit				
36	Casey	In	Out				
37-38	Kira	Out	Quit				
37-38	Romeo	In	Quit				
39	Salley	Wait	Quit				
40	Sierra	In	Quit				
41	Teddi	Date	Quit				
42-43	Hailey	Out					
42-43	Hunter	Out					

=== Key ===
The contestant is male
The contestant is female
Date The contestant went on a date and gave out a rose at the rose ceremony
Date The contestant went on a date and got a rose at the rose ceremony
In The contestant gave or received a rose at the rose ceremony, thus remaining in the competition
Last The contestant received the last rose
Last The contestant went on a date and received the last rose
Out The contestant went on a date and was eliminated
Out The contestant was eliminated
Quit The contestant had a date and voluntarily left the show
Quit The contestant voluntarily left the show
Out The contestant was medically evacuated.
Split The couple broke up and was eliminated
Split The couple had a date, then broke up and was eliminated
Stay The couple decided to stay together and won the competition
Wait The contestant had to wait before appearing in paradise
Split/Stay The couple split, but later got back together.
Quit The couple left together to pursue a relationship.

== Episodes ==
No. overall	No. in season	Title	Original release date	Prod. code	U.S. viewers (millions)	Rating/share (18–49)
75	1	"Episode 1: Season Premiere"	September 27, 2022	801	2.60	0.7
Arrivals: Serene, Michael, Andrew, Genevieve, Johnny, Teddi, Casey, Hailey, Brittany, Jill, Hunter, Sierra, Jacob, Shanae, Justin G., Lace, Logan, Brandon, Romeo, and Kira. Date Card: Andrew; Andrew's Date: Teddi; New Arrival: Victoria
76	2	"Episode 2"	October 3, 2022	802	2.15	0.6
Victoria's Date: Justin G. Date Card: Shanae; Shanae's Date: Logan
77	3	"Episode 3"	October 4, 2022	803	2.15	0.5
Rose Ceremony: Andrew gave his rose to Teddi, Michael gave his rose to Sierra, Brandon gave his rose to Serene, Logan gave his rose to Shanae, Casey gave his rose to Brittany, Jacob gave his rose to Lace, Justin G. gave his rose to Genevieve, Johnny gave his rose to Victoria, Romeo gave his rose to Jill. Hailey, Hunter, and Kira did not receive a rose and were sent home. New Arrivals: Ashley & Jared join for a romantic getaway and to give advice to the contestants. New Arrivals: James and Aaron; James & Aaron's Double Date: Shanae and Genevieve; New Arrival: Rodney; Departure: Teddi; Rodney's Date: Rodney planned to ask Teddi out on his date, however, he forfeited the date after Teddi's departure.
78	4	"Episode 4"	October 10, 2022	804	1.93	0.4
Date Card: Ashley and Jared; Date Card: Brandon; Brandon's Date: Serene; Departure: Sierra
79	5	"Episode 5"	October 11, 2022	805	2.11	0.6
New Arrival: Salley; Departure: Salley; New Arrival: Peter; Peter's Date: Brittany; Date Card: Jacob; Jacob's Date: Jill; Return: Kira; Departures: Kira & Romeo left paradise as a couple.
80	6	"Episode 6"	October 17, 2022	806	2.09	0.5
Departures: Ashley and Jared; Departure: Casey; Departure: Peter; New Arrival: Danielle; Rose Ceremony: Serene gave her rose to Brandon, Jill gave her rose to Jacob, Lace gave her rose to Rodney, Genevieve gave her rose to Aaron, Shanae gave her rose to Logan, Victoria gave her rose to Johnny, Brittany gave her rose to Andrew, Danielle gave her rose to Michael. James and Justin G. did not receive a rose and were sent home. Date Card: Danielle; Danielle's Date: Michael; Split Week: The original women (Jill, Genevieve, Shanae, Victoria, Brittany, Serene, Lace) were taken off the beach and sent to live in a hotel for the week, while the men stayed on the beach. New Arrivals on the Beach: Jessenia, Florence, Sarah, Kate, Eliza
81	7	"Episode 7"	October 18, 2022	807	2.25	0.6
New Arrivals at the Hotel: Rick, Olu, Alex, Tyler, Adam; Date Card: Shanae; Shanae's Date: Tyler; Date Card: Sarah; Sarah's Date: Logan; Date Card: Rodney; Rodney's Date: Eliza
82	8	"Episode 8"	October 24, 2022	808	2.37	0.6
Departure: Lace; Departures: Rick, Olu; Date Card: Kate; Kate's Date: Logan; Date Card: Victoria; Victoria's Date: Alex
83	9	"Episode 9"	October 25, 2022	809	2.58	0.6
Split Week: The original women (Jill, Genevieve, Shanae, Victoria, Brittany, Serene) returned to the beach. Departure: Jill; Split Week: The new men (Adam, Alex, Tyler) arrive at the beach.
84	10	"Episode 10"	October 31, 2022	810	2.31	0.5
Departure: Sarah; Rose Ceremony: Serene gave her rose to Brandon, Danielle gave her rose to Michael, Eliza gave her rose to Rodney, Genevieve gave her rose to Aaron, Jessenia gave her rose to Andrew, Brittany gave her rose to Tyler, Kate gave her rose to Logan, Shanae gave her rose to Jacob, Victoria gave her rose to Johnny, Florence gave her rose to Alex. Adam did not receive a rose and was sent home. Date Card: Victoria; Victoria's Date: Johnny; Return: Justin G. Justin G.'s Date: Eliza
85	11	"Episode 11"	November 1, 2022	811	2.31	0.5
New Arrival: Hayden; Hayden's Date: Kate; New Arrivals: Joey & Justin Y. Joey & Justin Y.'s Double Date: Shanae & Florence
86	12	"Episode 12"	November 7, 2022	812	2.46	0.6
Rose Ceremony: Genevieve gave her rose to Aaron, Jessenia gave her rose to Andrew, Victoria gave her rose to Johnny, Serene gave her rose to Brandon, Danielle gave her rose to Michael, Brittany gave her rose to Tyler, Shanae gave her rose to Joey, Florence gave her rose to Justin Y., Kate gave her rose to Logan, Eliza gave her rose to Rodney. Alex, Hayden, Jacob, and Justin G. did not receive a rose and were sent home. Date Card: Michael and Danielle. The couple were given a joint date card. Departures: Rodney and Eliza broke up. Eliza left to travel to Baltimore, Maryland and attempt to rekindle a relationship with Justin G.
87	13	"Episode 13"	November 14, 2022	813	2.28	0.5
Baltimore: Eliza talks with Justin about what happened after she picked Rodney and how she immediately flew to Baltimore after she left for Justin. Justin tells Eliza her picking Rodney over him hurt and told her they can't get back together. New Arrival: Mara; Mara's Date: Justin Y. New Arrivals: Ency, Lyndsey; Ency's Date: Andrew; Lyndsey's Date: Lyndsey asks Logan on a date, but he declines due to Kate telling him she doesn't think he should go. Departure: Lyndsey; Arrivals: Gabby & Rachel arrive on the beach to give advice and talk to the remaining girls.
88	14	"Episode 14"	November 15, 2022	814	2.35	0.5
Date Card: Tyler; Tyler's Date: Brittany; Arrivals: Becca & Thomas arrive to announce and host the Sadie Hawkins in Paradise dance. Departure: Jessenia, Andrew and Ency break up.
89	15	"Season Finale: Part 1"	November 21, 2022	815	2.53	0.5
Departure: Mara; Rose Ceremony: Michael gives his rose to Danielle, Brandon gives his rose to Serene, Johnny gives his rose to Victoria, Tyler gives his rose to Brittany, Aaron gives his rose to Genevieve, Justin Y., gives his rose to Florence, Joey gives his rose to Shanae. Logan offers his rose to Kate, which she declines. They break up and both are eliminated. Departures: Tyler & Brittany decide to stay together and leave as a couple. Joey & Shanae break up. Justin Y. & Florence break up. Aaron & Genevieve break up. Michael & Danielle decide to stay together and leave as a couple.
90	16	"Season Finale: Part 2"	November 22, 2022	816	2.62	0.6
Reunion: Romeo & Kira are still in a relationship. Jacob asked Jill if she could give him a second chance, and she agrees. They start dating again, but broke up a few days after the finale aired. Tyler reveals him and Brittany broke up. They met each others families, then Brittany took a vacation where she broke up with him over a FaceTime. Michael & Danielle are still together. Danielle reveals she's moving to Akron to be closer to Michael and his son, James. He tells her he loves her for the first time. Commitment Ceremony #1: Johnny proposes to Victoria and they get engaged. At the reunion, Johnny says him and Victoria broke up. He stated they had many arguments during their engagement. Victoria claimed she wasn't happy and didn't want to get married if she wasn't happy. They agreed to work on their issues instead of breaking up, but Johnny claimed she cheated on him with Greg Grippo from Katie's season and lied about it. Victoria said she did not cheat and he wanted to blame their breakup on someone else, but Johnny says that she still emotionally cheated. She is dating Greg now and is happy. Greg comes out and joins Victoria in the hot seat. Greg states him and Victoria had been friends for a while and started a relationship a few weeks after she got back from Paradise. They had their first date in Rome and got matching tattoos. Commitment Ceremony #2: Brandon proposes to Serene and they get engaged. Jesse Palmer asks if they want to get married on the beach right after, but they decline. The Bachelor preview: A preview for Zach's season is shown.
