= Love Trapped =

Non-fiction true crime podcast

- Genre: True Crime
- Country of origin: United States
- Language: English

Creative team
- Created by: Nancy Glass

Cast and voices
- Hosted by: Stephani Young
- Starring: Clayton Echard

Production
- Length: 30–60 minutes

Publication
- No. of seasons: 1
- No. of episodes: 31
- Original release: February 26, 2026
- Provider: iHeartRadio

Related
- Website: https://www.iheart.com/podcast/1119-love-trapped-323685861/

Love Trapped is a serial non-fiction true crime podcast. Hosted by reporter Stephani Young, the podcast is about a paternity scandal involving Clayton Echard, former reality television star of season 26 of The Bachelor.

== Plot ==
The podcast documents the paternity lawsuit brought by Laura Owens, a woman whom Echard went on one date with in 2023. Owens, the daughter of Bay Area radio personality Ronn Owens, was accused of impregnating Laura Owens after engaging in consensual oral sex. While the paternity claim initially caused a burst of negative media attention for Echard, the media and public grew more skeptical of Owens' claim as more details of Owens' prior conduct were made public.

Through the course of the series, Young finds other men with whom Owens claimed pregnancies under suspicious circumstances, or whom Owens allegedly coerced into continuing to date her. The series coincided with an ongoing criminal trial for Owens brought on by the Maricopa County District Attorney's Office. At the trial's conclusion, Owens admitted to having faked pregnancies and forging medical records with the aim of prolonging relationships with her victims.

The show's finale aired on November 12, 2026, weeks after Owens' sentencing hearing where she was sentenced to thirty days in jail, twelve months of deferred jail, and probation.

== Critical and commercial reception ==
Love Trapped was extremely popular almost immediately upon release: it was the number one podcast on Apple Podcasts after launching; ranked among Apple's top ten podcasts for thirty weeks; and was listed as one of the "Best So Far" podcasts of 2026 by Apple. Love Trapped also garnered critical acclaim, and won the silver medal for Best Documentary (True Crime) podcast at the 2026 Signal Awards. Love Trapped was nominated for a 2026 Astra Podcast Award in the Best True Crime Podcast category. In September 2026, Love Trapped was announced as one of thirty podcasts eligible for a 2027 Golden Globe award for Best Podcast.

Producer Nancy Glass told reporters that the production company, Glass Entertainment, is in talks regarding a TV adaptation of the season.

A second season of the show is currently being produced, with a different story.

== Television Adaptation ==
In November 2026, NBCUniversal's streaming service Peacock announced that they were planning to release a four-part documentary based on the podcast in 2027, titled “Love Trapped: The Case of Laura Owens." A Variety article on the documentary revealed that Laura Owens, who never sat for an interview for the podcast, would be interviewed for the documentary. Other interview subjects include Echard, as well as previous victims of Owens.
