= The Traitors (American TV series) season 3 =

The Traitors
- Season 3
- Promotional poster
- Presented by: Alan Cumming
- No. of contestants: 23
- Winners: Dolores Catania; Dylan Efron; Gabby Windey; Lord Ivar Mountbatten
- Runner-up: Britney Haynes
- Location: Ardross Castle, Scottish Highlands
- No. of episodes: 12

Release
- Original network: Peacock
- Original release: January 9 – March 6, 2025

Season chronology
- ← Previous; Season 2 Next → Season 4

The third season of the American television series The Traitors was announced on February 7, 2024. The season premiered on January 9, 2025. The season concluded on March 6, 2025 where Dolores Catania, Dylan Efron, Gabby Windey and Lord Ivar Mountbatten won as Faithfuls, while Britney Haynes placed as a runner-up, as a Traitor.

== Format ==
The show retained the same format and challenges as the The Traitors UK. The arrived contestants at the castle are referred to as the "Faithful," and among them are the "Traitors," a group of contestants secretly selected by the host, Alan Cumming. Each night, the Traitors would decide who to "murder," and that same contestant would leave the game. After the end of each day, where the contestants participated in various challenges to add money to the prize fund, they would participate in the Round Table, where they must decide who to banish from the game, trying to identify the Traitor.

If all the remaining players are Faithful, then the prize money is divided evenly among them. However, if any Traitors remain, they win the entire pot.

== Contestants ==
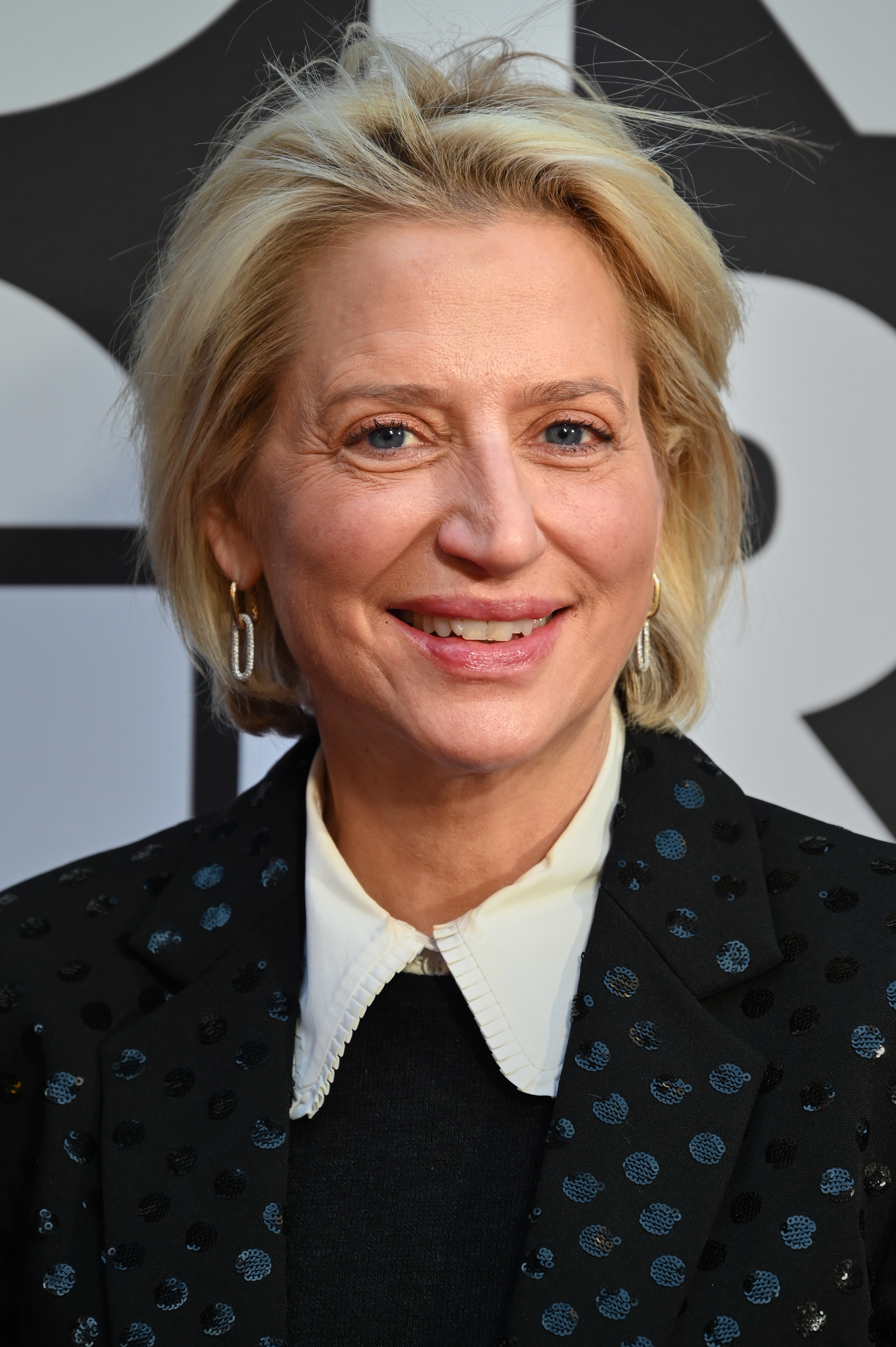
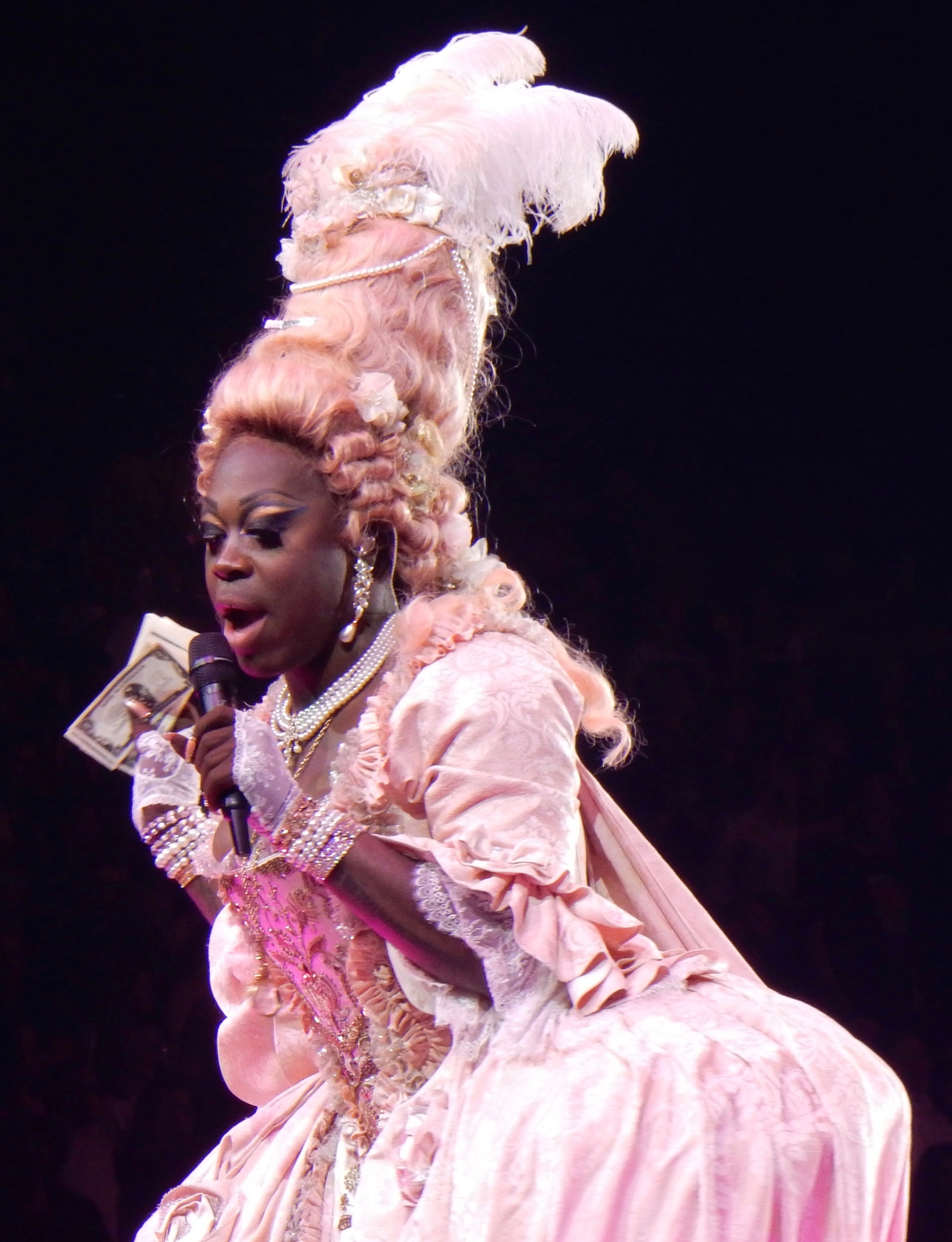
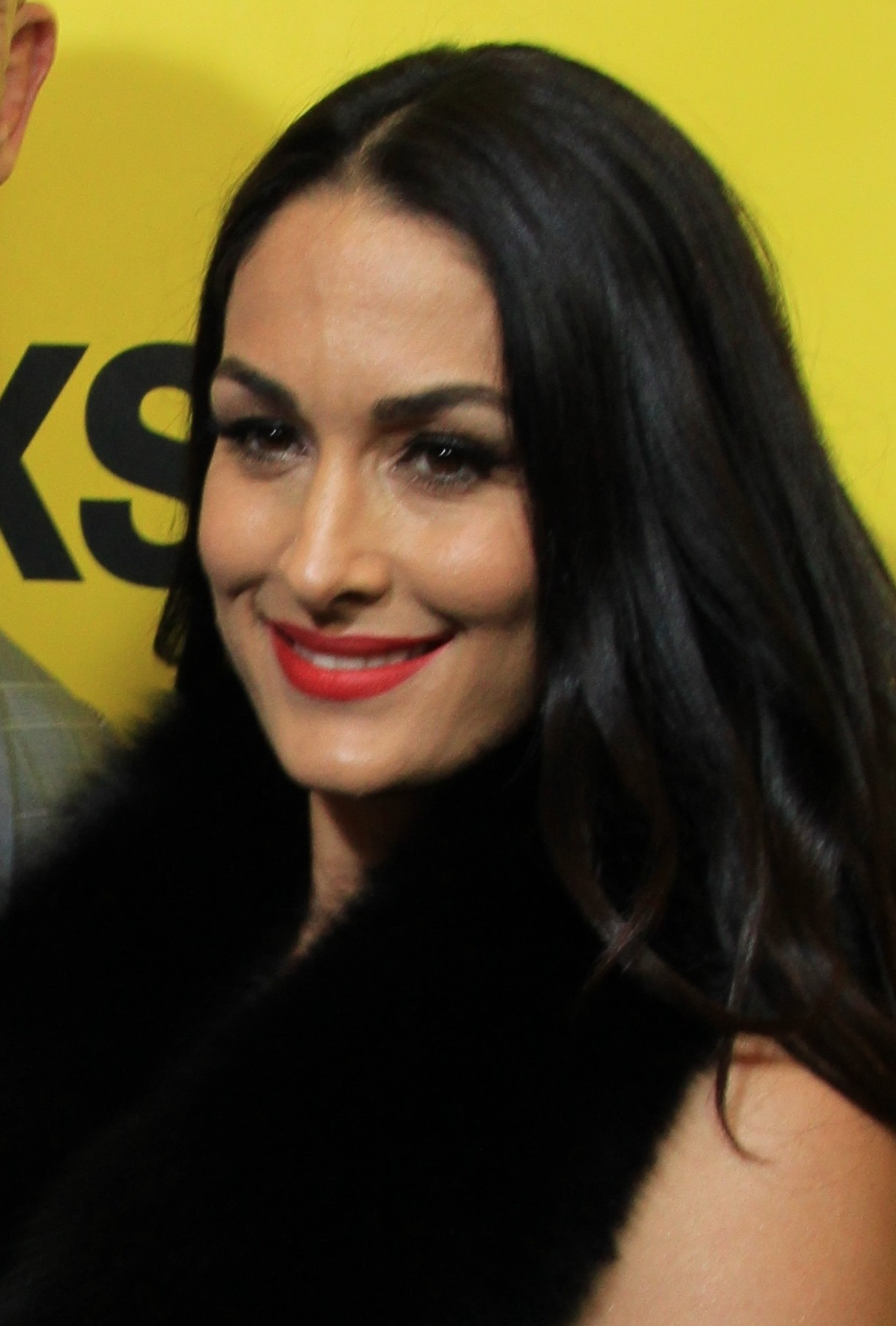
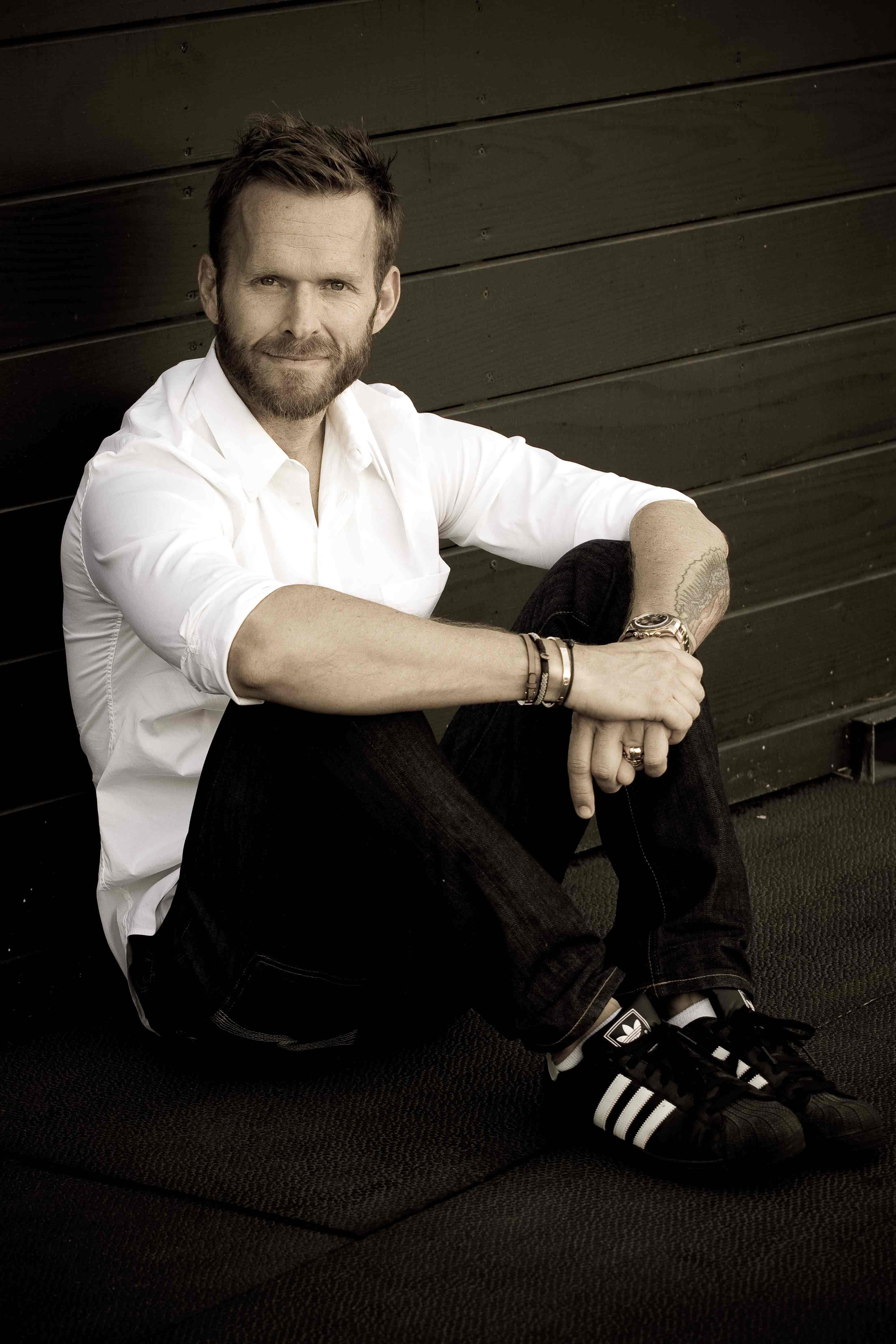
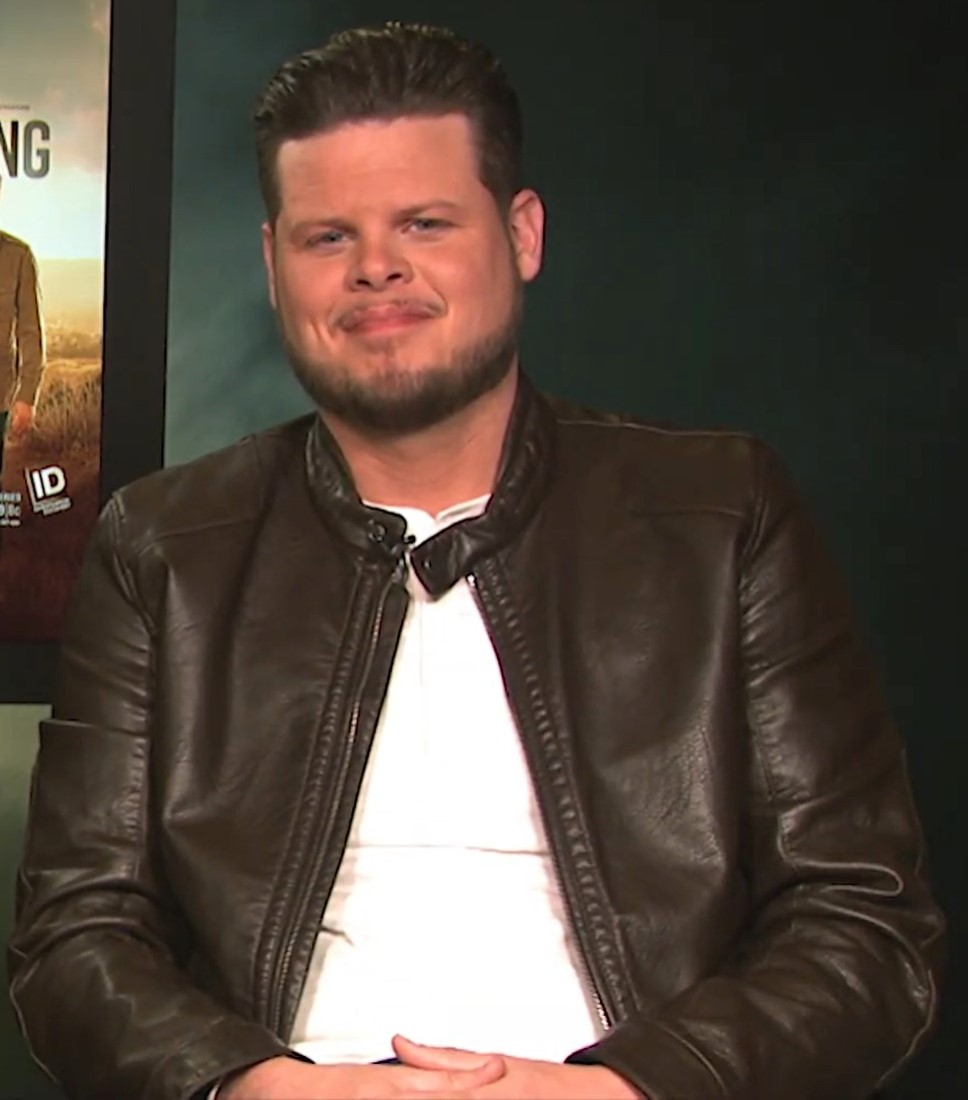
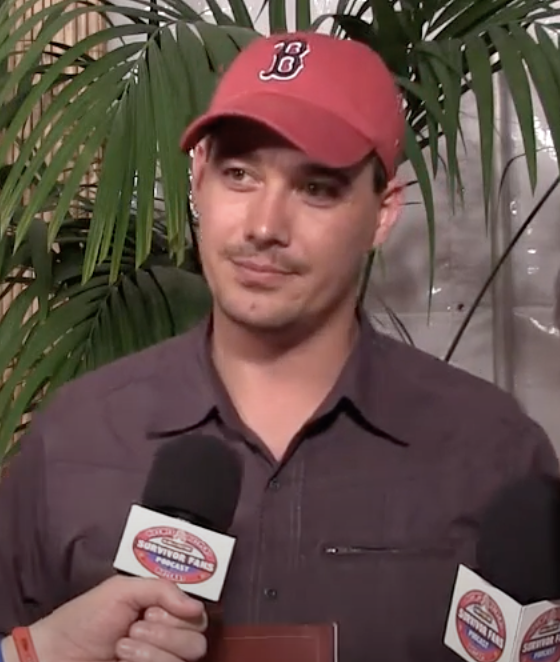
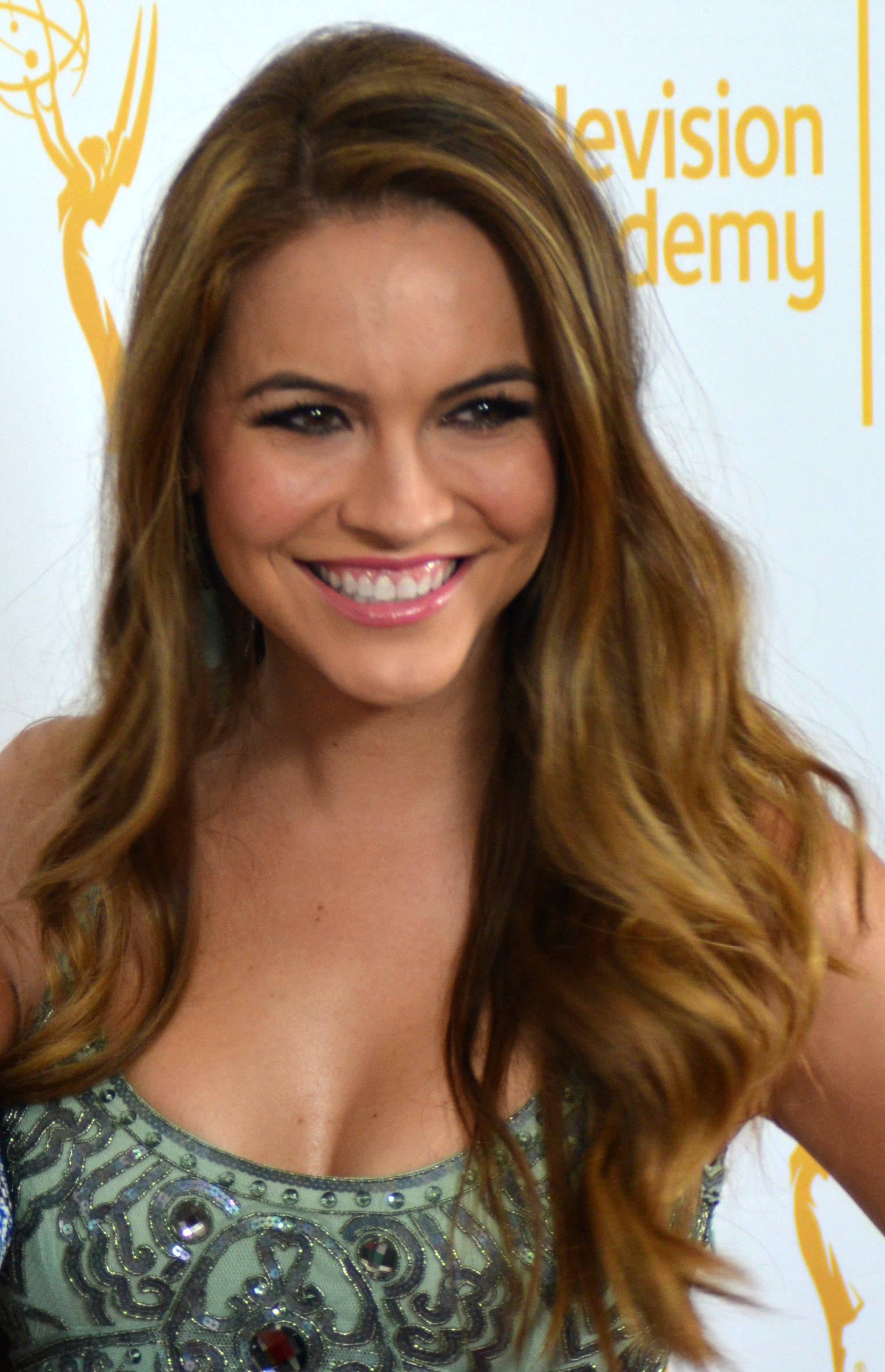
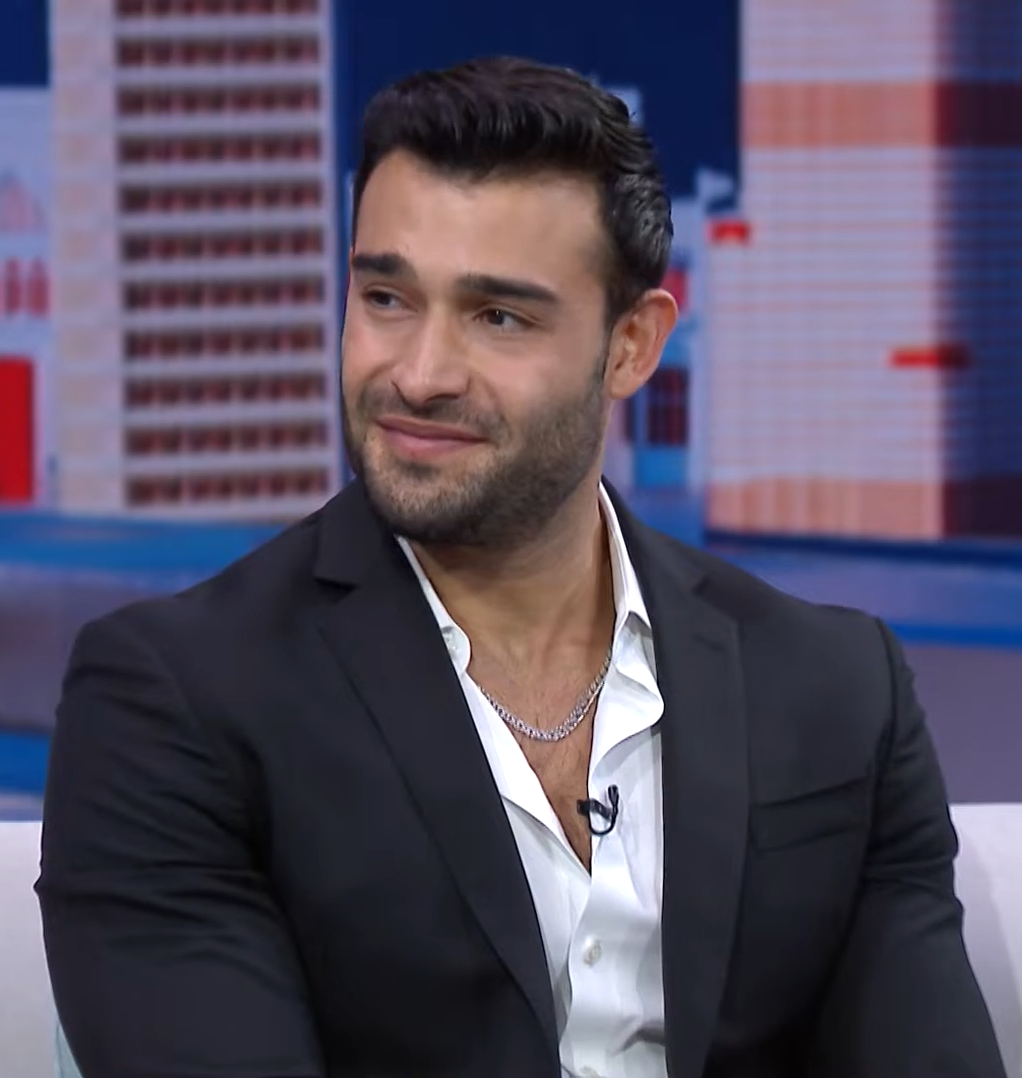
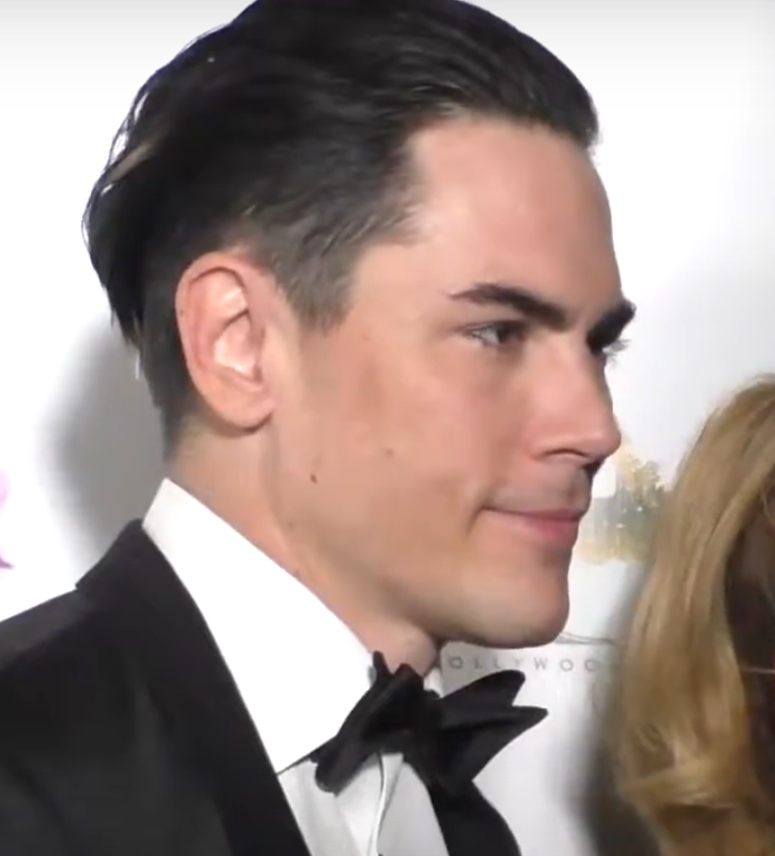
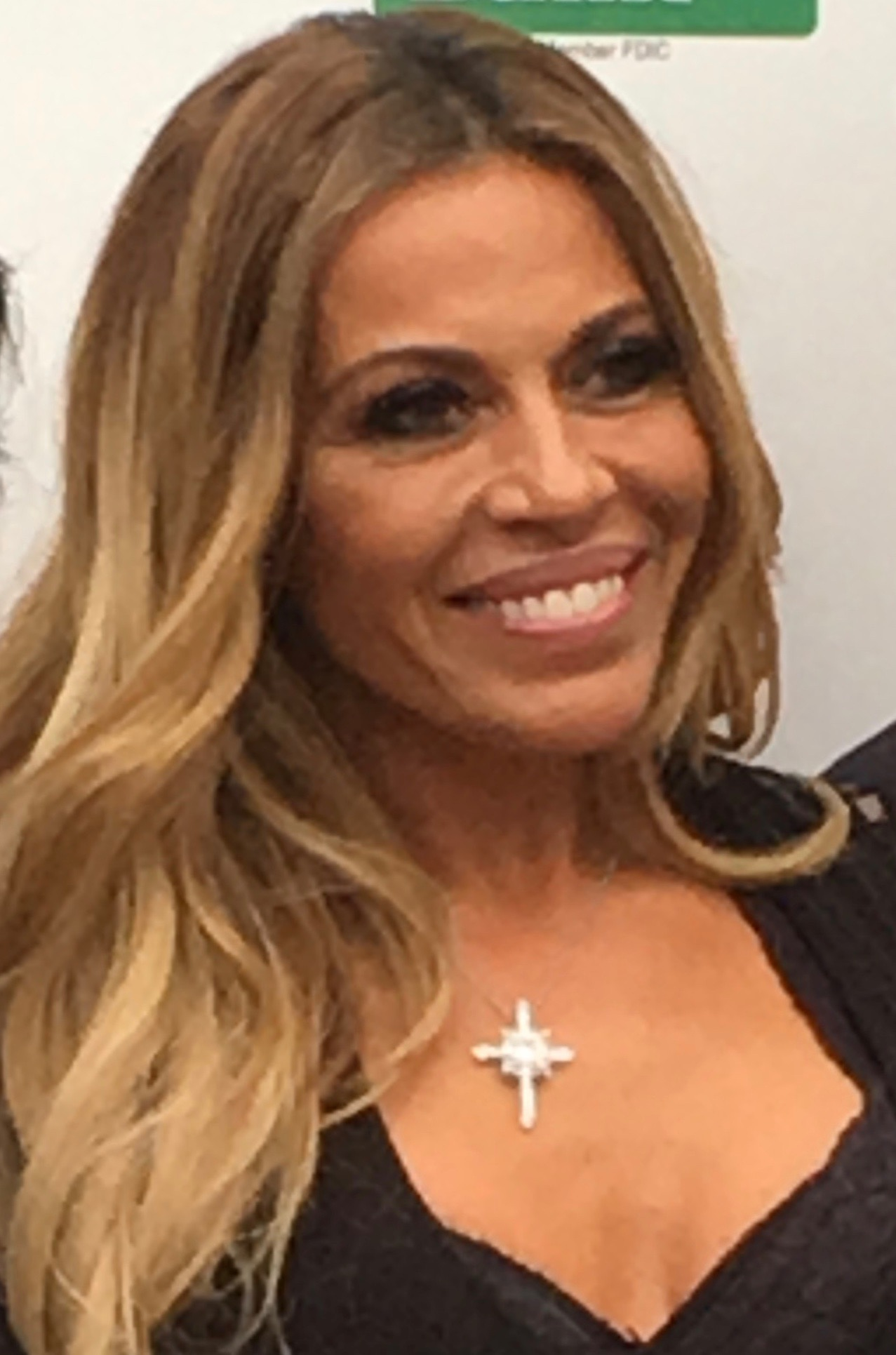
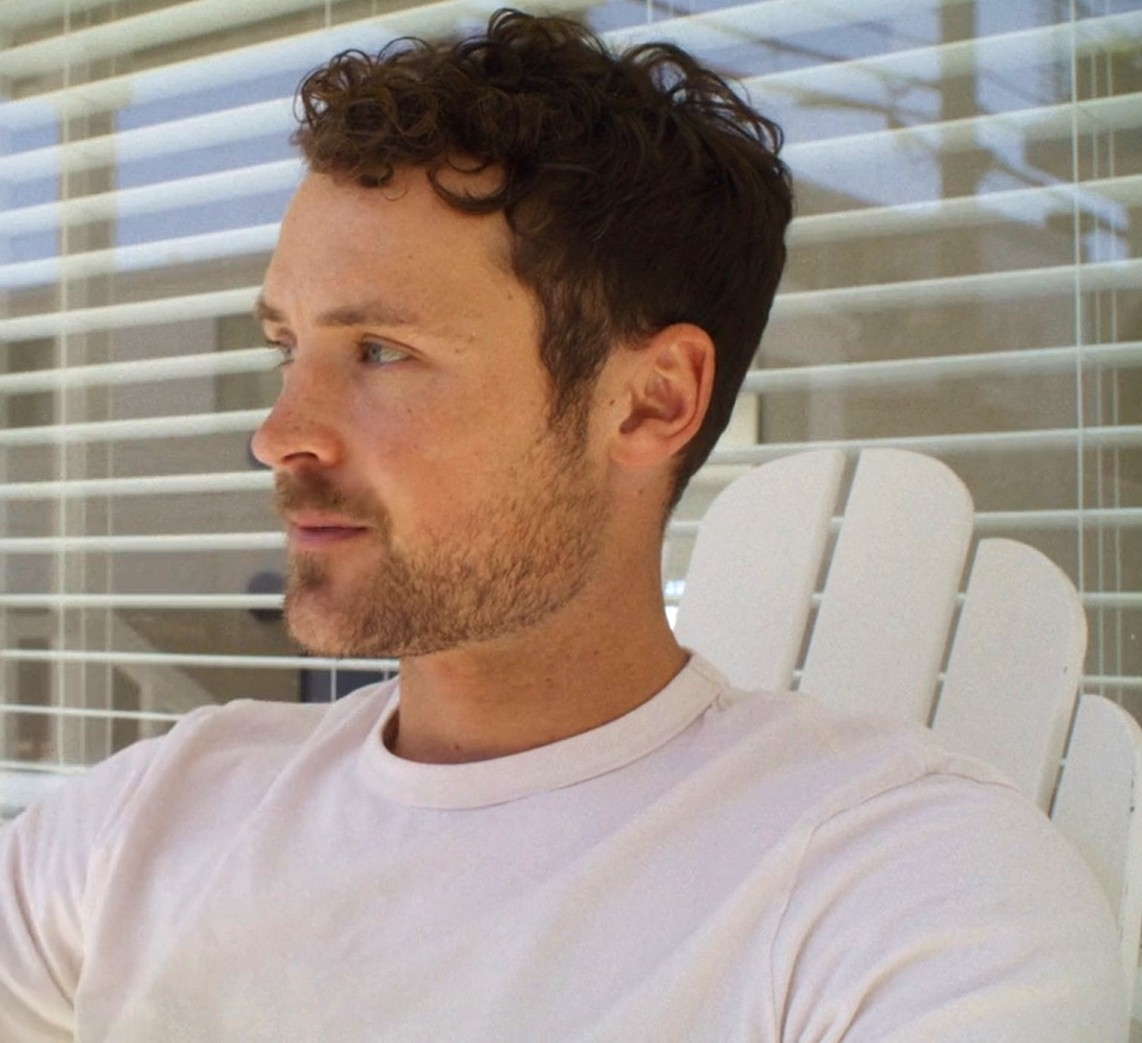
From left to right: Dorinda Medley, Bob the Drag Queen, Nikki Garcia, Bob Harper, Derrick Levasseur, Rob Mariano, Chrishell Stause, Sam Asghari, Tom Sandoval, Dolores Catania, and Dylan Efron

Similar to the second season, this season's cast was composed entirely of reality show participants and public figures. The 21 original players were announced on June 5, 2024, with two contestants (Wes and Derrick) entering the game in Episode 2 without a prior public announcement.

List of The Traitors contestants
Contestant	Age	From	Notability/Debut series	Affiliation	Finish
Dorinda Medley	59	New York City, New York	The Real Housewives of New York City	Faithful	Murdered (Episode 2)
Wells Adams	40	Los Angeles, California	The Bachelorette 12	Faithful	Banished (Episode 2)
Chanel Ayan	45	Dubai, United Arab Emirates	The Real Housewives of Dubai	Faithful	Murdered (Episode 3)
Tony Vlachos	50	Allendale, New Jersey	Survivor: Cagayan	Faithful	Banished (Episode 3)
Jeremy Collins	46	Foxborough, Massachusetts	Survivor: San Juan del Sur	Faithful	Murdered (Episode 4)
Bob the Drag Queen	37	New York City, New York	RuPaul's Drag Race 8	Traitor	Banished (Episode 4)
Robyn Dixon	45	Columbia, Maryland	The Real Housewives of Potomac	Faithful	Murdered (Episode 5)
Nikki Garcia	40	Napa, California	Total Divas/Meet My Folks (Note: Garcia was credited as a WWE Hall of Famer and has also competed in the 2006 WWE Diva Search.)	Faithful	Banished (Episode 5)
Bob Harper	58	New York City, New York	The Biggest Loser	Faithful	Murdered (Episode 6)
Wes Bergmann (Note: Bergmann and Levasseur entered the game in Episode 2.)	39	Leawood, Kansas	The Real World: Austin	Faithful	Banished (Episode 6)
Derrick Levasseur	40	Providence, Rhode Island	Big Brother 16	Faithful	Murdered (Episode 7)
Rob Mariano (Note: Mariano was originally exiled in Episode 1, but returned as a twist in Episode 2.)	48	Pensacola, Florida	Survivor: Marquesas	Traitor	Banished (Episode 7)
Chrishell Stause	42	Los Angeles, California	Selling Sunset/All My Children	Faithful	Murdered (Episode 8)
Ciara Miller	28	New York City, New York	Summer House	Faithful	Banished (Episode 8)
Sam Asghari	30	Los Angeles, California	Model/Actor	Faithful	Murdered (Episode 9)
Carolyn Wiger	37	Hugo, Minnesota	Survivor 44	Traitor	Banished (Episode 9)
Tom Sandoval	41	Los Angeles, California	Vanderpump Rules	Faithful	Murdered (Episode 10)
Danielle Reyes	52	San Francisco, California	Big Brother 3	Traitor	Banished (Episode 11)
Britney Haynes	36	Tulsa, Oklahoma	Big Brother 12	Traitor (Note: Haynes was recruited as a Traitor in Episode 10 following an ultimatum.)	Banished (Episode 11)
Dolores Catania	53	Edgewater, New Jersey	The Real Housewives of New Jersey	Faithful	Winner (Episode 11)
Dylan Efron	32	Manhattan Beach, California	Down to Earth with Zac Efron	Faithful	Winner (Episode 11)
Ivar Mountbatten	61	Uffculme, England	Aristocrat	Faithful	Winner (Episode 11)
Gabby Windey	33	Los Angeles, California	The Bachelor 26	Faithful	Winner (Episode 11)

== Episodes ==
The Traitors season 3 episodes
No. overall	No. in season	Title	Original release date
24	1	"Let Battle Commence"	January 9, 2025
25	2	"Revenge Is a Dish Best Served Cold"	January 9, 2025
26	3	"Nail in a Coffin"	January 9, 2025
27	4	"I Will Bury You Under the Sand"	January 16, 2025
28	5	"All This Murderous Power"	January 23, 2025
29	6	"A Dysfunctional Family"	January 30, 2025
30	7	"Til Death Us Do Part"	February 6, 2025
31	8	"A B**** Is Lying"	February 13, 2025
32	9	"A Silent Assassin"	February 20, 2025
33	10	"The Power of the Seer"	February 27, 2025
34	11	"The Day of Reckoning Is Upon Us"	March 6, 2025
35	12	"Reunion"	March 6, 2025

== Elimination history ==
Key
The contestant was a Faithful
The contestant was a Traitor
The contestant was ineligible to vote
The contestant was immune at this Banishment and Murder

Episode	1	2	3	4		5	6	7	8	9	10		11
Traitors' decision	None	Dorinda	Ayan	Ciara; Jeremy; Nikki	Jeremy	Robyn	Bob H.	Derrick	Chrishell	Sam	Britney	Tom	None (Note: No murder took place; having become the Seer, Britney selected Gabby to meet with her and reveal her identity.)
Traitors' decision	None	Murder		Shortlist (Note: After the Round Table in Episode 3, the Traitors were tasked to meet in plain sight to make a shortlist of three players to go inside a coffin where the Traitors would nail one of them shut, sealing their fate as that round’s murder. The Traitors decided to murder Jeremy.)	Murder						Ultimatum (Note: Following Carolyn's banishment, Danielle was offered the chance to meet a Faithful face-to-face and offer them an ultimatum: become a Traitor or be Murdered. She chose Britney, who accepted the offer.)	Murder	None
Shield	Britney; Carolyn; Chrishell; Ciara; Dylan; Gabby; Ivar; Jeremy; Nikki; Tom; Tony; Wells	Dylan; Jeremy; Tony	None	Bob H.; Bob TDQ; Britney; Chrishell; Danielle; Dolores; Dylan; Rob; Tom; Wes		Ciara; Dolores	Carolyn; Chrishell; Dylan	Britney; Ciara; Danielle; Ivar; Rob; Sam	Ciara	None			
Banishment	None	Wells	Tony	Bob TDQ		Nikki	Wes	Rob	Ciara	Carolyn	Tie (Note: The first round of voting resulted in a tie. Per the rules, a second vote was held where the players involved in the tie would not vote and the remaining players could only vote for those who tied.)	Danielle	Britney
Vote	None	5–4–4–2– 1–1–1–1	14–2–1–1– 1–1	11–4–2–1		14–1–1	7–5–1–1	7–2–2–1	9–1	4–2–1–1	3–3	3–1 (Note: Danielle's banishment was revealed in Episode 11 after the tied vote ended on a cliffhanger in Episode 10.)	4–1
Dolores	No; Vote	Ivar	Tony	Bob TDQ		Nikki	Tom	Tom	Ciara	Tom	Ivar	Ivar	Britney
Dylan	No; Vote	Robyn	Bob TDQ	Bob TDQ		Gabby	Wes	Gabby	Ciara	Carolyn	Danielle	Danielle	Britney
Gabby	No; Vote	Robyn	Tony	Ciara		Nikki	Rob	Rob	Ciara	Danielle	Danielle	Danielle	Britney
Ivar	No; Vote	Dolores	Robyn	Bob TDQ		Nikki	Wes	Rob	Ciara	Carolyn	Danielle	No; Vote	Britney
Britney	No; Vote	Jeremy	Tony	Bob TDQ		Nikki	Wes	Rob	Ciara	Carolyn	Ivar	Danielle	Dylan
Danielle	No; Vote	Robyn	Tony	Bob TDQ		Nikki	Rob	Rob	Ciara	Carolyn	Ivar	No; Vote	Banished (Episode 10)
Tom	No; Vote	Jeremy	Tony	Nikki		Nikki	Rob	Rob	Ciara	Dolores	Murdered (Episode 10)		
Carolyn	No; Vote	Wells	Tony	Bob TDQ		Nikki	Danielle	Rob	Ciara	Danielle	Banished (Episode 9)		
Sam	No; Vote	Wells	Tony	Bob TDQ		Nikki	Wes	Rob	Ciara	Murdered (Episode 9)			
Ciara	No; Vote	Ivar	Tony	Bob TDQ		Nikki	Wes	Britney	Britney	Banished (Episode 8)			
Chrishell	No; Vote	Tom	Tony	Bob TDQ		Nikki	Wes	Tom	Murdered (Episode 8)				
Rob	Exiled (Note: At the beginning of the game, Alan offered the players a chance for Rob to enter the game by shaking his hand. If someone were to accept this offer, they would have to exile another player of their choice. Nobody took the offer, and thus Rob was exiled.)	No; Vote (Note: Derrick and Wes, along with the returning Rob, were introduced to the game in Episode 2. Upon their introduction, they could not be voted for or murdered that night. They were also not allowed to vote at the Round Table that night.)	Tony	Bob TDQ		Nikki	Wes	Britney	Banished (Episode 7)				
Derrick	Not in Game	No; Vote	Tony	Ciara		Nikki	Rob	Murdered (Episode 7)					
Wes	Not in Game	No; Vote	Ivar	Nikki		Nikki	Rob	Banished (Episode 6)					
Bob H.	No; Vote	Ivar	Tony	Bob TDQ		Nikki	Murdered (Episode 6)						
Nikki	No; Vote	Ayan	Tony	Ciara		Ciara	Banished (Episode 5)						
Robyn	No; Vote	Wells	Tony	Ciara		Murdered (Episode 5)							
Bob TDQ	No; Vote	Ivar	Ivar	Rob		Banished (Episode 4)							
Jeremy	No; Vote	Wells	Tom	Murdered (Episode 4)									
Tony	No; Vote	Wells	Bob H.	Banished (Episode 3)									
Ayan	No; Vote	Tony	Murdered (Episode 3)										
Wells	No; Vote	Robyn	Banished (Episode 2)										
Dorinda	No; Vote	Murdered (Episode 2)											

=== End game ===
Episode	11	
Decision	End Game	Game Over; Faithful Win
Vote	4–0	Game Over; Faithful Win
Dolores	End Game	Winners
Dylan	End Game	Winners
Gabby	End Game	Winners
Ivar	End Game	Winners

== Missions ==
Episode	Title	Money available	Money earned	Total pot	Shield winner
1	"Let Battle Commence"	$40,000	$20,000	$20,000	Britney
1	"Let Battle Commence"	$40,000	$20,000	$20,000	Carolyn
1	"Let Battle Commence"	$40,000	$20,000	$20,000	Chrishell
1	"Let Battle Commence"	$40,000	$20,000	$20,000	Ciara
1	"Let Battle Commence"	$40,000	$20,000	$20,000	Dylan
1	"Let Battle Commence"	$40,000	$20,000	$20,000	Gabby
1	"Let Battle Commence"	$40,000	$20,000	$20,000	Ivar
1	"Let Battle Commence"	$40,000	$20,000	$20,000	Jeremy
1	"Let Battle Commence"	$40,000	$20,000	$20,000	Nikki
1	"Let Battle Commence"	$40,000	$20,000	$20,000	Tom
1	"Let Battle Commence"	$40,000	$20,000	$20,000	Wells
Row a Viking longboat to the other side of the loch. As players progressed, they paused at pontoons to gather fuel and gold. To collect these items, two players had to be shackled to each pontoon, putting them at risk of being murdered. At the end of the loch, any players and gold inside the giant ring of fire were safe from murder, and the money was added to the prize fund.
2	"Revenge Is a Dish Best Served Cold"	$15,000	$15,000	$35,000	Dylan Jeremy Tony
Collect and deposit gold coins. Three players who would be intruders were suspended in cages in the woods. Sacks containing gold coins were hanging from the trees. The team had to collect the coins and decide which player to release by placing the coins in one of three tubes. Each player released within the time limit received a shield that they could give to anyone of their choice.
3	"Nail in a Coffin"	$20,000	$0	$35,000	—N/a
Navigate through a fun house with a balloon. Players formed pairs to transport a golden balloon through a fun house without popping it. Each balloon was worth $2,000. Only one safe route existed to reach the end. Players had to choose one of four doors to pass through. Selecting the correct door allowed them to continue, while an incorrect choice meant the balloon was popped by a horror clown. The first pair to navigate the doors successfully received shields.
4	"I Will Bury You Under the Sand"	$20,000	$20,000	$55,000	Bob H.
4	"I Will Bury You Under the Sand"	$20,000	$20,000	$55,000	Bob TDQ
4	"I Will Bury You Under the Sand"	$20,000	$20,000	$55,000	Britney
4	"I Will Bury You Under the Sand"	$20,000	$20,000	$55,000	Chrishell
4	"I Will Bury You Under the Sand"	$20,000	$20,000	$55,000	Danielle
4	"I Will Bury You Under the Sand"	$20,000	$20,000	$55,000	Dolores
4	"I Will Bury You Under the Sand"	$20,000	$20,000	$55,000	Dylan
4	"I Will Bury You Under the Sand"	$20,000	$20,000	$55,000	Rob
4	"I Will Bury You Under the Sand"	$20,000	$20,000	$55,000	Tom
4	"I Will Bury You Under the Sand"	$20,000	$20,000	$55,000	Wes
Build statues. The players had to move giant heads and bodies up a hill and build all 10 statues on plinths to win. Each head had a players name on it and every player whose head was on the statue got a shield.
5	"All This Murderous Power"	$20,000	$15,000	$70,000	Ciara Dolores
Answer questions correctly. If a player got a question correct they add $2,500 to the prize pot and could put a portrait of themselves or another player in one of two frames. If a player gets a question wrong then they are eliminated from the mission. Whoever has their portrait in the two frames at the end of the mission get shields.
6	"A Dysfunctional Family"	$30,000	$30,000	$100,000	Carolyn
6	"A Dysfunctional Family"	$30,000	$30,000	$100,000	Chrishell
6	"A Dysfunctional Family"	$30,000	$30,000	$100,000	Dylan
Unlock crates to reveal a shield or gunpowder; incorrect answers would cause the contents to explode. There were three shields available. The players also had to gather 500kg of gunpowder in a barrel to destroy a Traitor statue.
7	"Til Death Us Do Part"	$27,000	$22,500	$122,500	Britney
7	"Til Death Us Do Part"	$27,000	$22,500	$122,500	Ciara
7	"Til Death Us Do Part"	$27,000	$22,500	$122,500	Danielle
7	"Til Death Us Do Part"	$27,000	$22,500	$122,500	Ivar
7	"Til Death Us Do Part"	$27,000	$22,500	$122,500	Rob
7	"Til Death Us Do Part"	$27,000	$22,500	$122,500	Sam
Hold hands with your partner for 8 mins in a box to add $4,500 per pair to the price pot. The pairs receive "gifts" that are added to the box and on them. Two pairs go up against each other for a shield, the pair that holds their hands longer than the other pair will win it. If both couples manage to complete the 8 mins, they will have to look for a ring in the box filled with critters to get a shield. First to find the ring between the rivaling pairs wins protection from murder.
8	"A B**** Is Lying"	$20,000	$20,000	$142,500	Ciara
Find 4 dolls that sing nursery rhymes backwards. To identify the songs, team dolls house has to memorize and sing the lines via phone to team castle. Team castle then has to sing it into a gramophone and play it backwards. Each correctly identified nursery rhyme will add $5,000. Only team doll is eligible to win the only available shield.
9	"A Silent Assassin"	$20,000	$10,000	$152,500	—N/a
Move and think like a traitor. The players faced an enormous chess board featuring their names. The team was required to respond to questions and position a chess piece on the name of the player they thought was the correct answer. For every answer that aligned with the responses provided by the Traitors, $5,000 was contributed to the prize fund.
10	"The Power of the Seer"	$30,000	$14,300	$166,800	—N/a
Players had to complete 3 challenges to bank gold, adding a potential $30,000 to the prize fund. Whoever banked the most gold individually out of those who survived the next banishment would become the Seer with the power to know one player's true identity.
11	"The Day of Reckoning is Upon Us"	$50,000	$37,500	$204,300	—N/a
The final mission was done in two parts. In the first part the players had to solve riddles and locate the bags of money within 30 minutes. In the second part, the players had to volunteer to hang beneath a helicopter with bags of gold, which they had to drop into a burning ring of fire. The players done this in two pairs and one player would do it solo. Each bag was worth $2,500 which would be doubled if it landed in the ring of fire or stay the same if it didn't. There was no time limit for the second part.

== Production ==
Similar to the previous seasons, primary filming takes place in Ardross Castle in the Scottish Highlands.
