= Gabby Windey =

American television personality (born 1991)

- Born: Gabriela Maria Windey; January 2, 1991 (age 35); Sacramento, California, U.S.
- Education: University of Colorado Colorado Springs (BSN)
- Occupation: Television personality
- Years active: 2021–present
- Spouse: Robby Hoffman (m. 2025)

TikTok information
- Page: gabbywindey
- Followers: 1.1 M
- Last updated: March 27, 2026

Gabriela Maria Windey (born January 2, 1991) is an American television personality. She appeared on season 26 of The Bachelor and co-starred in season 19 of The Bachelorette alongside Rachel Recchia. In 2022, Windey placed second on season 31 of Dancing with the Stars and co-hosted the Dancing with the Stars Live 2023 tour. She also won the third season of The Traitors.

== Early life and education ==
Windey was born in Sacramento, California, to parents Rosemary Hewitt and Patrick Windey. She has an older sister named Jazz. Windey is half Mexican with some Apache ancestry. She attended O'Fallon Township High School, where she was the sports editor in the school paper and won Miss O'Fallon in 2008. She graduated from the University of Colorado Colorado Springs in 2013, and then moved to Denver, Colorado.

== Career ==
Windey worked as a nurse in the intensive care unit at University of Colorado Hospital. She was also an NFL cheerleader for the Denver Broncos for 5 years. In 2021, she was the co-winner of the Pop Warner Humanitarian Award for her service on the frontline of the pandemic. She is the first woman and NFL cheerleader to receive the award.

Windey hosts a podcast called Long Winded with Gabby Windey.

=== Reality television ===
==== The Bachelor ====
In September 2021, Windey was revealed to be a contestant on season 26 of The Bachelor, starring medical sales representative Clayton Echard. She was the co-runner-up with fellow finalist Rachel Recchia.

==== The Bachelorette ====
During the live After the Final Rose special of Echard's season, Windey was announced as The Bachelorette alongside Recchia. This marked the first time that there would be two leads for an entire season.

==== Dancing with the Stars ====
On September 8, 2022, Windey was announced as a contestant on season 31 of Dancing with the Stars. She was partnered with Val Chmerkovskiy and they finished in 2nd place. During the finale, she was announced as one of the co-hosts for the Dancing with the Stars Live 2023 tour and was at all stops.

Average: 36.6

Week #	Dance / Song	Judges' scores					Result
Week #	Dance / Song	Inaba	Goodman	Hough	Tonioli	Total	Result
1	Jive / "As It Was"	7	7	7	7	28	Safe
2	Viennese waltz / "Can't Help Falling In Love"	8	8	8	8	32	Safe
3	Cha-cha-cha / "Die Another Day"	8	8	8	9	33	Safe
4	Quickstep / "Mr. Blue Sky"	9	9	9	9	36	Safe
5	Foxtrot / "If the World Should Ever Stop"; Tango / "Good Girls Go Bad"	9; 10	9; 10	9; 10	9; 10	36; 40	No elimination Safe
6	Rumba / "Home"	9	9	9	10	37	Safe
7	Argentine tango / "Shivers"; Team Freestyle / "The Witches Are Back"	10; 8	9; 8	9; 9	10; 8	38; 33	Safe
8	Samba / "Livin' La Vida Loca"	10	10	10	10	40	Safe
9	Waltz / "I'm Kissing You"; Paso doble / "Malagueña"	10; 10	10; 10	10; 10	10; 10	40; 40	Safe
10	Cha-cha-cha / "I Like It (Like That)"; Freestyle / "Cell Block Tango"	10; 10	10; 10	10; 10	10; 10	40; 40	Runner-up

==== The Traitors ====
On June 5, 2024, it was announced Windey would compete on the third season of The Traitors. She won the series as a Faithful, alongside Lord Ivar Mountbatten, Dolores Catania, and Dylan Efron.

==== Love Overboard ====
In 2026, Windey was announced as the host for the reality dating television series Love Overboard, produced by Alex Cooper.

== Personal life ==
In August 2023, Windey came out during an appearance on ABC's The View when she revealed she was dating a woman. She subsequently announced her relationship with comedian and TV writer Robby Hoffman, and the couple married in January 2025. In 2025, Windey stated that she identifies as a lesbian, describing her attraction to women as central to her identity and saying that she does not see herself dating men again.

== Filmography ==
Year	Title	Role	Notes
2022	The Bachelor	Contestant	Runner-up; season 26, 12 episodes
2022	The Bachelorette	Herself	Co-lead; season 19, 12 episodes
2022	Dancing with the Stars	Contestant	Runner-up; season 31, 11 episodes
2025	The Traitors	Contestant	Winner; season 3, 12 episodes
2025	The Tonight Show Starring Jimmy Fallon	Herself	Guest; 1 episode
2025	Watch What Happens Live with Andy Cohen	Herself	Guest; 1 episode
2025	The Kelly Clarkson Show	Herself	Guest; 1 episode
2025	Just Trish	Herself	Guest; 1 episode
2026	Love Overboard	Herself	Host
2026	The Body	Coach Shauna Miller	Recurring role
TBA	Peaked †	TBA	Filming

Preceded by Michelle Young	The Bachelor runner up Season 26 (with Rachel Recchia)	Succeeded by Gabi Elnicki
Preceded by Michelle Young	The Bachelorette; Season 19 (with Rachel Recchia)	Succeeded by Charity Lawson
