= The Bachelorette (American TV series) season 18 =

Season of US reality television show

The Bachelorette
- Season 18
- Promotional poster
- Starring: Michelle Young
- Presented by: Tayshia Adams; Kaitlyn Bristowe
- No. of contestants: 30
- Winner: Nayte Olukoya
- Runner-up: Brandon Jones
- No. of episodes: 11

Release
- Original network: ABC
- Original release: October 19 – December 21, 2021

Additional information
- Filming dates: July 30 – September 9, 2021

Season chronology
- ← Previous; Season 17 Next → Season 19

The eighteenth season of The Bachelorette premiered on October 19, 2021. This season features 28-year-old Michelle Young, an elementary school teacher from Woodbury, Minnesota.

Young was the runner-up on the 25th season of The Bachelor featuring Matt James.

The season concluded on December 21, 2021, with Young accepting a proposal from 27-year-old sales executive Nayte Olukoya. They announced their breakup on June 17, 2022.

== Production ==
=== Casting and contestants ===
Young was announced as the Bachelorette by Emmanuel Acho during the After the Final Rose special of the 25th season of The Bachelor on March 15, 2021.

The cast includes offensive guard Bryan Witzmann; undrafted tight end Clayton Echard; 2011 Minnesota Mr. Basketball award winner Joe Coleman; and LT Murray IV, grandson of actor Clint Eastwood.

=== Filming and development ===
On August 2, 2021, it was reported that former Bachelorettes Tayshia Adams and Kaitlyn Bristowe were set to return as co-hosts for the eighteenth season.

As with the last three American Bachelor Nation editions, which were filmed in a bio-secure bubble due to the COVID-19 pandemic, this season started production on July 30, 2021 at the Renaissance Esmeralda Resort & Spa at the Coachella Valley in Indian Wells, California. Some quarantine restrictions were lifted halfway through the season, the cast and crew were allowed to leave the bubble with limited amount of travel from one location to another including Young's home state of Minnesota. The cast and crew were valid proof of requirement of vaccination status. For the first time since the fifteenth season, the season was able to leave the United States, as both overnight dates and last chance dates returned to its standard format and took place in Mexico with COVID safety precautions in place.

Country music singer Caroline Jones, WNBA players Dearica Hamby and Diamond DeShields, actors Glen Powell and Jay Ellis, spoken word poet Rudy Francisco, professional wrestlers Nikki and Brie Bella, and musician Andy Grammer made guest appearances this season.

On December 21, 2021, the day of the season finale, Adams revealed she had been exposed to COVID-19 and was not able to host the live finale and After the Final Rose special. This left Bristowe to be the sole host. Due to the potential COVID-19 resurgence, audiences must present a negative PCR test and wear masks for the duration of the show.

== Contestants ==
35 potential contestants were revealed on July 26, 2021.

The final cast of 30 men was announced on September 27, 2021.

| Name | Age | Hometown | Occupation | Outcome | Place | Ref |
|---|---|---|---|---|---|---|
| Nayte Olukoya | 27 | Winnipeg, Manitoba | Sales Executive | Winner | 1 | |
| Brandon Jones | 26 | Portland, Oregon | Traveling Nurse Recruiter | Runner-Up | 2 | |
| Joe Coleman | 28 | Minneapolis, Minnesota | Real Estate Developer | Week 8 | 3 | |
| Rodney Mathews | 29 | Rancho Cucamonga, California | Sales Representative | Week 7 | 4 | |
| Olumide "Olu" Onajide | 27 | Woodland Park, New Jersey | IT Analyst | Week 6 | 5–6 | |
| Rick Leach | 32 | Munroe Falls, Ohio | Medical Sales Representative | Week 6 | 5–6 | |
| Martin Gelbspan | 29 | Córdoba, Argentina (Note: Martin Gelbspan is originally from Córdoba in Argentina but was residing in Miami, Florida at the time of casting and filming.) | Personal Trainer | Week 6 | 7 | |
| Clayton Echard | 28 | Eureka, Missouri | Medical Sales Representative | Week 6 | 8 | |
| Casey Woods | 36 | Parkland, Florida | Advertising Creative Director | Week 5 | 9–10 | |
| Leroy Arthur | 27 | Durham, North Carolina | Biomedical PhD Student | Week 5 | 9–10 | |
| Chris Sutton | 28 | New Orleans, Louisiana | Commodities Broker | Week 5 | 11 | |
| Chris Gallant | 28 | Halifax, Nova Scotia | Motivational Speaker | Week 4 | 12–14 | |
| Romeo Alexander | 32 | Tribeca, New York | Mathematician | Week 4 | 12–14 | |
| Will Urena | 28 | Santo Domingo, Dominican Republic (Note: Will Urena is originally from Santo Domingo in the Dominican Republic but was residing in Grand Rapids, Michigan at the time of casting and filming.) | Academic Interventionist | Week 4 | 12–14 | |
| Lowell "LT" Murray IV | 38 | Bellevue, Washington | Yoga Guru | Week 3 | 15–18 | |
| Mollique Johnson | 36 | James Hill, Jamaica (Note: Mollique Johnson is originally from James Hill in Jamaica but was residing in San Diego, California at the time of casting and filming.) | Academic Administrator | Week 3 | 15–18 | |
| Peter Izzo | 26 | Bellmore, New York | Pizzapreneur | Week 3 | 15–18 | |
| Spencer Williams | 25 | Cleveland, Ohio | Financial Crimes Analyst | Week 3 | 15–18 | |
| Jamie Skaar | 32 | Tacoma, Washington | Biotech CEO | Week 3 | 19 | |
| Alec Thompson | 29 | Forest, Virginia | Engineer | Week 2 | 20–23 | |
| Daniel Tully | 26 | Austin, Texas | Firefighter | Week 2 | 20–23 | |
| Pardeep Singh | 30 | Brooklyn, New York | Neuroscientist | Week 2 | 20–23 | |
| PJ Henderson | 30 | Houston, Texas | Firefighter | Week 2 | 20–23 | |
| Brandon Kieffer | 29 | Sulphur, Louisiana | Brand Manager | Week 1 | 24–29 | |
| Bryan Witzmann | 31 | Houlton, Wisconsin | NFL Player | Week 1 | 24–29 | |
| Edward Naranjo | 27 | Brownsville, Texas | Wellness Coach | Week 1 | 24–29 | |
| Garrett Aida | 33 | Salt Lake City, Utah | Tech CEO | Week 1 | 24–29 | |
| Jack Russell | 30 | Greensboro, North Carolina | Former Army Officer | Week 1 | 24–29 | |
| JoMarri Gable | 26 | Fresno, California | Personal Trainer | Week 1 | 24–29 | |
| Ryan Fox | 30 | Sanger, California | Environmental Consultant | Week 1 | 30 | |

=== Future appearances ===
==== The Bachelor ====
Clayton Echard was chosen as the lead for the 26th season of The Bachelor shortly after the completion of filming of The Bachelorette.

==== Bachelor in Paradise ====
Season 8

Brandon Jones, Casey Woods, Olu Onajide, Peter Izzo, Rick Leach, Rodney Mathews, and Romeo Alexander returned for season 8 of Bachelor in Paradise. Alexander left in a relationship with Kira Mengistu in week 2. Woods and Izzo quit in week 2. Leach and Onajide were eliminated in week 3. Mathews split from Eliza Isichei in week 5. Jones got engaged to Serene Russell in week 6.

Season 9

Will Urena returned for season 9 of Bachelor in Paradise. He was eliminated in week 2.

==== Bachelor in Paradise Canada ====
Season 2

Garrett Aida and Edward Naranjo returned for season 2 of Bachelor in Paradise Canada. Naranjo was eliminated in week 4. Aida left in a relationship with Meagan Morris in week 6.

==== Perfect Match ====
Clayton Echard participated in season 3 of Perfect Match.

== Call-out order ==
| Order | Bachelors | Week | | | | | | | | |
| Order | Bachelors | 1 | 2 | 3 | 4 | 5 | 6 | 7 | 8 | 9 |
|---|---|---|---|---|---|---|---|---|---|---|
| 1 | Nayte | Nayte | Brandon J. | Martin | Martin | Joe | Nayte | Brandon J. | Nayte | Nayte |
| 2 | Romeo | Jamie | Jamie | Rodney | Olu | Clayton | Brandon J. | Nayte | Brandon J. | Brandon J. |
| 3 | Jack | Leroy | Joe | Brandon J. | Rick | Nayte | Joe | Joe | Joe | |
| 4 | Clayton | Martin | Nayte | Joe | Brandon J. | Rick | Rodney | Rodney | | |
| 5 | Jamie | Spencer | Rodney | Rick | Leroy | Olu | Olu; Rick | | | |
| 6 | Chris G. | Rick | Martin | Leroy | Joe | Brandon J. | Olu; Rick | | | |
| 7 | Mollique | Clayton | Rick | Nayte | Rodney | Martin | Martin | | | |
| 8 | Alec | Peter | Leroy | Casey | Clayton | Rodney | Clayton | | | |
| 9 | Will | PJ | Spencer | Chris G. | Casey | Casey; Leroy | | | | |
| 10 | Pardeep | Mollique | Casey | Chris S. | Nayte | Casey; Leroy | | | | |
| 11 | Olu | Romeo | Chris G. | Clayton | Chris S. | Chris S. | | | | |
| 12 | Chris S. | Daniel | Mollique | Olu | Chris G. Romeo; Will | | | | | |
| 13 | Garrett | Brandon J. | Olu | Romeo | Chris G. Romeo; Will | | | | | |
| 14 | Casey | Will | Chris S. | Will | Chris G. Romeo; Will | | | | | |
| 15 | Brandon K. | Chris S. | Will | LT; Mollique; Peter; Spencer | | | | | | |
| 16 | LT | Rodney | Romeo | LT; Mollique; Peter; Spencer | | | | | | |
| 17 | Rick | Alec | LT | LT; Mollique; Peter; Spencer | | | | | | |
| 18 | Ryan | Pardeep | Clayton | LT; Mollique; Peter; Spencer | | | | | | |
| 19 | Rodney | Chris G. | Peter | Jamie | | | | | | |
| 20 | Peter | Casey | Alec; Daniel; Pardeep; PJ | | | | | | | |
| 21 | Daniel | Olu | Alec; Daniel; Pardeep; PJ | | | | | | | |
| 22 | PJ | LT | Alec; Daniel; Pardeep; PJ | | | | | | | |
| 23 | Brandon J. | Joe | Alec; Daniel; Pardeep; PJ | | | | | | | |
| 24 | Spencer | Brandon K. Bryan; Edward; Garrett; Jack; JoMarri | | | | | | | | |
| 25 | Bryan | Brandon K. Bryan; Edward; Garrett; Jack; JoMarri | | | | | | | | |
| 26 | JoMarri | Brandon K. Bryan; Edward; Garrett; Jack; JoMarri | | | | | | | | |
| 27 | Edward | Brandon K. Bryan; Edward; Garrett; Jack; JoMarri | | | | | | | | |
| 28 | Leroy | Brandon K. Bryan; Edward; Garrett; Jack; JoMarri | | | | | | | | |
| 29 | Martin | Brandon K. Bryan; Edward; Garrett; Jack; JoMarri | | | | | | | | |
| 30 | Joe | Ryan | | | | | | | | |

The contestant received the first impression rose
The contestant received a rose during a date
The contestant was eliminated
The contestant was eliminated during a date
The contestant was eliminated outside the rose ceremony
The contestant won the competition

== Episodes ==
| No. overall | No. in season | Title | Original release date | Prod. code | U.S. viewers (millions) | Rating (18–49) |
|---|---|---|---|---|---|---|
| 193 | 1 | "Week 1: Season Premiere" | October 19, 2021 | 1801 | 3.00 | 0.8/4 |
The season begins at Renaissance Esmeralda Resort & Spa in Indian Wells where Michelle starts her journey. Memorable entrances include Romeo speaking in French, Clayton presents a yardstick, Will speaks his introductory in Spanish, Chris S. rides on a school bus even wearing a school uniform, Garrett shows up on a cane despite having broken his foot, LT wears a sexy stripper dress, Rick is seen inside the table when Michelle opens a "present" for him, Ryan arrives on an ice cream truck, Rodney shows up wearing his apple top dress, Peter hurls a slab of pizza, Daniel arrives via fire truck even he is a firefighter, Spencer presents with two dribbling balls, and JoMarri rips his suit to show his biceps. After giving the toast of the men, Michelle recognizes Joe because they are from the same city and Joe having ghosted Michelle previously, Peter presents ricotta to Michelle and even she survives the taste, Rick was still seen intact inside the table and even he reveals himself to introduce Michelle normally, Ryan serves ice cream to Michelle and himself and even they taste like a sorbet. Tayshia and Kaitlyn check in to Ryan's room filled with documents that he used to compete at Bachelor Live on Stage the year before, Michelle then comes to the room to look at the documents and she is quickly shocked to see this. Then, Michelle eliminates Ryan. Nayte tells Michelle about his parents have been divorced, that his mom got remarried and he ends up receiving the first impression rose. At the rose ceremony, Brandon K., Bryan, Edward, Garrett, Jack, and JoMarri are eliminated.
| 194 | 2 | "Week 2" | October 26, 2021 | 1802 | 2.87 | 0.7/3 |
The first group date of the season consists of Brandon J., Romeo, Rick, PJ, Will, Olu, Casey, Daniel, LT, and Peter where they have to take part in a fifth-grade class. Michelle is the teacher and schoolchildren Mia, Riley and Kennedy mentor the men as they have to compete in four separate subjects (mathematics, chemistry, musical chairs, and spelling). Peter got a rough day when competing in all subjects. In the spelling challenge, Brandon spelled protein wrong, and Peter and Will are head-to-head in the final battle, Peter raised his hand to show the word "narcissist". The night portion where Michelle gives Brandon J. the group date rose for having good humor. The guys know about Peter's incident causing his accusations, and he and Will have going to rift apart. Jamie gets the first one-on-one date of the season, Michelle picks him up and they travel to Joshua Tree National Park where they rock climb onto the top of the hill to set a picnic. During the night portion, Jamie tells Michelle about his mother who was 18 when she gave birth to him and that she and his father are never married due to issues with mental health. Ultimately, Jamie receives the rose and has a private concert with Caroline Jones. Before the start of the next group date, Joe gets a phone call from home and has learned that his coach has died. He is named on that date along with Clayton, Rodney, Martin, Mollique, Chris S., Chris G., Pardeep, Nayte, and Spencer to take part in "The Bachelorette's Basketball Battle". Michelle brought WNBA players Dearica Hamby and Diamond DeShields where they have to split up in two teams of five, with the losing team would be sent home. Blake Arthur provided the commentary. The blue team has won while the red team was declared losers resulting in a score of 28–25, Joe emerged victorious (despite being on the losing team) and was named Mr. MVP in honor of his coach and he is invited for the after party. At the after-party, Michelle gives a kiss to Joe, and Nayte gives a kiss to Michelle as well. Joe receives the group date rose. At the cocktail party, Rodney takes an apple test quiz even he wears a blindfold to reveal which apple would be better and he gives Michelle a kiss. Jamie tells Martin that has learned a rumor when Joe and Michelle went into a bar in Minneapolis prior to the show. Martin is too suspicious that he doesn't want to reveal the truth to Michelle, causing Jamie against his lies. Michelle becomes very nervous and Tayshia comes in to see her reactions, canceling the party. At the rose ceremony, Alec, Daniel, Pardeep, and PJ are eliminated.
| 195 | 3 | "Week 3" | November 2, 2021 | 1803 | 2.74 | 0.7/3 |
The first group date consists of Martin, LT, Olu, Spencer, Clayton, Nayte, Joe, Rick, Will, and Peter where they arrived at Palm Springs Air Museum, Michelle has brought Glen Powell and Jay Ellis, stars of the long-delayed film Top Gun: Maverick to compete in various aviation challenges. Each two-person competitor will be on a head-to-head race. Will faces his anxiety while riding on a G-force simulator and is able to do it. He and Peter for a head-to-head battle once again in the final round and Will was named the winner, with a prize of riding a vintage Porsche 911 car used from the original movie. At the after-party, Clayton sees Michelle and surprises her for a G-force style dance, Peter and Will began to argue when Peter got mad and threw the latter's jacket onto the pool. In the end, Martin receives the group date rose as he and Michelle enjoy a slow dance with an instrumental version of "Take My Breath Away" being performed by the string trio. Afterward, Will picks up his jacket from a pool. Rodney gets on his one-on-one date where he has to take part for truth or dare which began at night. Michelle gets a blindfold first while Rodney eats the room service food inside the hotel's kitchen. Then, the two are in handcuffs for a present while Rodney has found a key, and he has given a dare to streak naked across the hotel lobby. Michelle holds a megaphone, while Tayshia, Kaitlyn, and the men watch Rodney running on the stairs. Afterward, Rodney tells Michelle about his relationship with his mom that she had struggled to raise him and his brother being a single mom, and he ends up receiving the rose. Jamie, Leroy, Chris G., Casey, Mollique, Chris S., Brandon J., and Romeo are called for the second group date to walk across the resort to take part in stage poetry. Poet and author Rudy Francisco are on the stage to see the men. As the men prepared to write their poems, Chris S. becomes excited about his poem reminiscing about the school, Jamie lost his cool by showing his poetry skills referring to Michelle as a "token black girl". At the after-party, Brandon J. tells Michelle about his diverse background. Jamie shows Michelle how being more captivated during their time together. Brandon J. gets the date rose for the second consecutive week. Once the date ends, Jamie grabs a producer to give a talking together about his attitude in the show. At the cocktail party, Rick tells Michelle about Jamie questioning Michelle's integrity, as Jamie shows his manipulation. Rick knew Jamie started the drama the previous week. Jamie tells Nayte and Casey about his behavior as tensions arise and Jamie could not provide the answers because of his continuous lies, Michelle comes in to talk with Jamie about his reasons in the show and she agreed with the decision, Jamie is sent home, ending the cocktail party early. At the rose ceremony, LT, Mollique, Peter, and Spencer are eliminated.
| 196 | 4 | "Week 4" | November 9, 2021 | 1804 | 2.60 | 0.6/4 |
Kaitlyn gets one-on-one with Michelle to tell what had happened on her time with Jamie's shock exit at the previous week. Martin gets the one-on-one date. He and Michelle arrive at BMW Performance Center in Palm Springs where they race in BMW 3 Series cars together. Martin and Michelle talk about the Week 3 cocktail party and her sending Jamie home. Martin shares his opinions about Jamie, leaving Michelle thinking he was questioning her decision on sending him home. During the night portion of the date, Michelle asks Martin about what he shared earlier that day. They share past experiences in their lives. Martin ends up receiving the rose, and they go to Rancho Mirage Library & Observatory. Will, Chris S., Casey, Chris G., Leroy, Rodney, Olu, Brandon J., Clayton, Joe, Romeo & Nayte are called for the group date. They all get gift bags before the date that have pajamas. Michelle and the guys arrive at the group date where it is slumber party themed. Michelle feels caught off guard that all of the guys are spending more time together than with her. The guys play games together and she feels unseen. Nikki & Brie Bella come to the group date to host The Ultimate Teddy Bear Takedown. The guys get split into two teams, where the winning team gets to spend extra time with Michelle. Clayton, Leroy, Nayte, Casey, Romeo, and Olu win. Michelle then tells Kaitlyn how hurt she is after feeling unseen by the guys on the date. Michelle tells the guys that are left on the date about how she feels. Olu gets the group date rose. Rick gets the second one-on-one date where he and Michelle ride in a Palm Springs Aerial Tramway up to the top of the mountain with an overview of Palm Springs and have hiked through the woods with a series of clues written by hikers inside the wish box. Rick shares his background with Michelle, that he had a close relationship with his father, until he died three years earlier. During the night portion, Rick tells Michelle on the whereabouts of his parents and learned his experience when his mom woke him up to move into another house. Rick ends up receiving the rose and Andy Grammer made his appearance where he sings a song. At the cocktail party, Nayte and Chris S. believe the guys on how Chris S. doesn't understand that he was emotionally upset. Michelle soon arrives to talk with Chris S. having his problems with his less controlled issues. Brandon J. gets his time with Michelle but he doesn't step up when Chris S. reappeared. Clayton thinks that Chris S. about his blanket statement not giving his effort with the men. Nayte then confronts Chris S. to start backlash as he didn't calm down to ease his mood. Michelle gets one-on-one time with Joe and presents her of M&M's. At the rose ceremony, Chris G., Romeo, and Will are eliminated. Michelle announces to the remaining men that she will head to her home state of Minnesota and the men will go to that place to continue her journey.
| 197 | 5 | "Week 5" | November 16, 2021 | 1805 | 2.98 | 0.7 |
The remaining men travelled to Minneapolis. Michelle reunites with her parents in her hometown of Woodbury before the guys arrive. Joe is selected for the first one-on-one date. They go to Target Field for the Minnesota Twins game where Michelle throws out the first pitch and they give a kiss in front of the crowd. Then they go to Michelle's alma mater, Woodbury High School where they show pictures of Michelle from that school. Michelle shows Joe around and they play basketball. At the night portion where takes place at Betty Danger's Country Club, Joe opens up his backstory to Michelle about being oriented with sports, especially basketball, having had suffered numerous injuries that he gave up his sporting career after suffering with anxiety and depression. Joe receives the date rose. Martin, Olu, Rick, Brandon, Leroy, Rodney, Clayton, Casey and Chris are called for the group date to meet with Michelle at U.S. Bank Stadium as they would take part in an "Ultimate Viking" challenge which the hosts are the descendants of Vikings to dress the men into Viking costumes where they have been challenged with traditional Viking delicacies including herring, and a blend of cow brains, tongue, and cheek. The final face-off is arm-wrestling and Clayton wins the challenge. At the after-party in the Semple Mansion, Clayton tells Michelle that he is well-loved to his family who he is very close, Brandon then gives a taste of Swedish fish by Michelle, Chris began to confront the other men especially Martin for not with the right reasons. Clayton receives the date rose. Nayte gets the second one-on-one date on a harbor at Wayzata into Lake Minnetonka, where Michelle rides a boat and meets with her two best friends, Tia and Allie for their 4-on-1 time together. Michelle's friends show Nayte his physical chemistry with Michelle and the two end up swimming together on a lake. At the night portion in the U.S. Bank Stadium, they discuss goals with the potential relationship, Michelle tells Nayte about her own previous relationship until Chris shows up in the middle of the portion, where he interrupts Michelle and she gives him to talk with his reasons and she sent him home. Michelle then gave the rose to Nayte and the fireworks show at the end of the date. At the final cocktail party of the season, Rick and Michelle dance on the streets just close to the Marquette Hotel, Brandon celebrates his 27th birthday and Michelle presents a cake for him, Martin tells his satisfaction to the men and Michelle does not guarantee at all. At the rose ceremony, Casey and Leroy are sent home.
| 198 | 6 | "Week 6" | November 23, 2021 | 1806 | 2.71 | 0.6/3 |
Michelle meets her fifth-grade students from her school: Luke, Kelsey, Ahmed, and Jayleen at the Marquette Hotel to evaluate the men for the upcoming one-on-one date. One of the kids thinks about Clayton's strong muscles, and Olu gets a push-up. Clayton has won the part for the date with Michelle, as they are inside the limousine were treated with packs of food and arrive at Bell Museum of Natural History in Saint Paul to explore the sights at the museum. Clayton tells his backstory when he had a rough last 5 years of his life, Michelle is thinking to give Clayton a rose but her chemistry with Clayton became weak and he was sent home. The next day, Clayton is greeted by Kelsey and Luke at his hotel room giving letters to him when he reads both of his letters whether he would get married, become a father, and have kids, ending in tears. The final group date of the season has Rick, Rodney, Nayte, Joe, Martin, and Olu at the dairy farm outside Minneapolis, where they have been tasked with milking cows at the barn and churning butter. Joe wins the challenge after having his milk almost completely fill up a bottle. The final task is cleaning the manure, Nayte hurt his back while filling up on a wheelbarrow, Michelle carries Rodney in the wheelbarrow. Michelle and the men get a ride on a tractor for the after-party, Nayte takes his time with Michelle apart from his family situation that he is really wanted to introduce Michelle to his father and they gave a kiss. Michelle then has a talk with Martin about his potential time to meet his family as soon enough who started to bicker with Olu, Michelle thinks Martin is immature and stubborn and she sent Martin packing. In the end, Michelle gave the rose to Nayte. Brandon gets the final one-on-one date of the season, where Michelle picks him up and they drive to Stillwater. They stop to eat ice cream at Nelson's Ice Cream and proceed to her house in Woodbury. Michelle gives Brandon the tour of the house while her parents are away, showing family pictures and then change for the house jacuzzi, with Brandon borrowing Michelle's dad's swim trunks. Michelle's parents arrive home on a surprise and they have seen Brandon borrowing the swim trunks as the time Brandon meets the parents. Brandon then has a talk with Michelle's parents hoping to give a blessing on her. At the night portion, Brandon becomes excited to introduce his family to Michelle and he has receives the one-on-one date rose. At the rose ceremony, Olu and Rick are sent home; Nayte, Brandon, Joe, and Rodney are named the F4 and they are all black men, making the first time in the history of Bachelor Nation franchise.
| 199 | 7 | "Week 7: Hometowns" | November 30, 2021 | 1807 | 3.07 | 0.6/7 |
Brandon gets the first hometown date showing his life around his hometown of Portland, Oregon, where he accompanies Michelle to do skateboarding at 3rd Lair Skate Park in Golden Valley. Then, Michelle meets Brandon's family including his brother Noah, who had been excused to travel to the United States Naval Academy in order to meet with the bachelorette. Michelle then talks with Brandon's father David, who is an avid fisherman fan just like her own father who looks convinced on the conversation. Rodney gets the second hometown date at the park and he brings Michelle to Minnetonka Orchards where they get an apple picking from the apple trees with Michelle carrying the basket to store the fruits, then followed a bike ride across the grassy field. Rodney's mother Carrie is assured with Michelle's doubt that thinking about life outside the bubble zone as Rodney is getting a risk for a potential heartbreak, knowing that Rodney's mother proves for a better relationship. Joe gets the third hometown date at his alma mater, Hopkins High School in Minnetonka, where he gives Michelle a tour of high school to give his hangout spot at the library and proceed to a gymnasium to take part for a prom, as he had never taken a prom before. Joe's family is assured on meeting Michelle to chat with his family, Joe could make enough to have Michelle for a seal of approval from his sister-in-law, who had a conversation along with Joe and his brother. Nayte gets the last hometown date to explore near the Stone Arch Bridge, where he and Michelle take part on a paddleboarding above the Mississippi River and set up for relaxation. Then, Michelle is introduced to Nayte's stepfather Charles and his mother Leanne, as they are now divorced. Nayte's mom gives Michelle a present of candy from Canada for her students. As the mother reassures her relationship with Nayte to start a proposal, and even his stepfather gives a chat about the interaction, as Nayte is going to move on that he might not get ready for engagement. A pleasant surprise when Michelle sees her best friends and castmates from The Bachelor, Bri Springs, and Serena Pitt to give time for counseling. At the rose ceremony, Rodney is sent home and Michelle gives him a final talk before heading to the exit vehicle.
| 200 | 8 | "The Men Tell All" | December 6, 2021 | N/A | 2.08 | 0.5/7 |
Kaitlyn and Tayshia welcome back fifteen eliminated men from the season. They get right into Peter and Will's drama with them arguing about Peter's pizza business. Peter tries to explain his side of the story and Casey says he was "awful" all day, every day, and imitates Peter. Tayshia and Kaitlyn read some of the reviews for his restaurant after Peter says Will has been harassing him off-camera. Peter has a man come out to give Will papers saying he has been served for "defamation of character" and Will tosses the papers on the ground. Ryan apologizes for the notes that were found on the first night and apologizes to the guys for not getting time with Michelle. Pradeep gets mad at him about it saying he just wanted to go viral. Martin shares he felt like he wasn't respected when he was sent home. Will says he heard a rumor Martin had a girlfriend when filming. Casey said he heard the same thing from Peter who heard it from Martin, but he denies it. Chris S. says he came off strong with everything he shared, but his intentions were genuine. Olu speaks on Chris S. about him saying he has a low IQ. He gets mad about it and stands up and walks over to him yelling. Rodney and Peter block Olu from Chris S. Jamie comes from backstage to join Tayshia and Kaitlyn in the hot seat. He explains what he meant about his "Spring Break Mode" comment and what he meant about the comments he told Michelle at a cocktail party. Jamie admits he would've owned up at the cocktail party, but he didn't, thinking it would've been a distraction. Rick is in the hot seat next where he watches his journey back and says it's tough and that he thought Michelle was his person. Producers wheel out a tray with Rick a cake of Rick's head on it. Kaitlyn talks to Tayshia about her split with fiancé, Zac, from her own season of the show. Tayshia says she's heartbroken and they go to Rodney joining them in the hot seat. Rodney apologizes to Tayshia about her break up and she then walks off stage. Rodney and Kaitlyn watch his journey back and says he's still heartbroken and is "Team Michelle." He says there is a plan for him, which leads Kaitlyn to say something about him joining Bachelor in Paradise next summer. They show cut segments from group dates and show a preview on the upcoming season of The Bachelor featuring Clayton Echard. Season 14 bachelorette Becca Kufrin stands up and gives an update on her relationship with Thomas Jacobs and shares about the upcoming The Bachelor: Live on Stage Tour. Michelle joins Kaitlyn and Tayshia in the hot seat, where she praises Rodney and Rick. Jamie praises Michelle, but she goes back to him saying she's not sure how he can preach positivity now if he wasn't like that on the show. Martin also apologizes for what he said when leaving, and Chris S. apologizes for speaking over her at a cocktail party. Michelle apologizes to Olu because she feels she sent him home too early. Bloopers are shown, and Peter brings pizza for everyone from his restaurant, and he and Will make amends.
| 201 | 9 | "Week 8: Fantasy Suites" | December 14, 2021 | 1808 | 3.29 | 0.7/5 |
The overnight dates took place at Punta Mita, Sayulita, Mexico. Kaitlyn talks with Michelle where had to discuss about her journey on the show and the whereabouts of the three remaining men. As the men stayed together at Conrad Punta de Mita. Brandon gets on his first date with Michelle as they took on a horseback ride across to the beach where they stroll on Banderas Bay. Brandon explains on how being close to Michelle and their families are a little closer than he would really want to spend time together as sooner, and he receives the fantasy suite invitation with fireworks being concluded and Brandon brings breakfast together at the hotel they stayed. Joe goes for his next date as Michelle faces him on a zipline down below to set up a picnic. The night portion that Joe explains to Michelle to have for a potential future together and would set to move being closer to Michelle as they're from the same state and ends up on a fantasy suite. Nayte goes into the harbor as Michelle stands up on a catamaran to where they ride on it for themselves, Nayte thinks about his relationship with Michelle recalling his relationship with his stepfather back in the hometown dates. This ends up Nayte receiving the fantasy suite invitation and heard the group of Mariachi performers down to the ground below. At the rose ceremony, Brandon goes aside to talk with Michelle and explains his hard time to have a better relationship. Nayte and Brandon received roses, and Joe is sent home even Joe steps aside to talk with Michelle and ending in tears at the exit vehicle.
| 202 | 10 | "Week 9: Season Finale" | December 21, 2021 | 1809 | 3.50 | 0.7/3 |
The two finalists, Brandon and Nayte, have their opportunity to meet Michelle's family in Mexico. Brandon had already met Michelle's parents back in Minnesota as he has yet to meet Michelle's sister, Angela. Brandon receives a gift of swim trunks for Michelle's father, Ephraim, as he gets to talk with Brandon explaining on his relationship with Michelle that he wants to get married, Nayte is next when he has praised upon meeting with his potential in-laws, he then gets a talk with Michelle's mother, LaVonne, to give his goal for proposing Michelle as LaVonne doesn't think for an engagement, that she quickly gives his regret and accepts the blessing. Over to the final dates, Brandon takes on a jet ski ride on a shore with Michelle and soon they get laid down on a beach. At the night portion, Brandon gives Michelle a present of the sweater. Nayte goes to take part in a shaman ritual where he and Michelle met Raul, to cleanse out their horrible feelings and express their future. They later give their time on thinking about a potential relationship with the two. When Michelle goes to her hotel room, a note has been left at the door that comes out a letter from Brandon has she read. Brandon goes in first for the proposal, Michelle feels distressed on her awaiting a difficult decision at the final rose ceremony on a beach down below when she sees Brandon and they give a talk, citing that her time with Brandon must come to an end and Brandon leaves heartbroken when he got furious in tears and throws the engagement ring to the shore. Michelle calms herself down that rethinking her choice as the next person awaits, and Nayte arrives at the proposal where he gets down on one knee that he proposes Michelle and they are now engaged. Michelle got Nayte his final rose and a group of Mariachi performers play their tune to begin this romantic fairytale.
| 203 | 11 | "After the Final Rose" | December 21, 2021 | N/A | 2.93 | 0.6/2 |
Immediately after the finale, Kaitlyn discusses the season. Brandon goes in for a hot seat telling his time for the show including a heartbreak that he felt very devastated and could not recover from the situation, Michelle then goes to see Brandon and quickly apologizes and Brandon states that he is going to move forward. Michelle and Nayte made their first public appearance along with their parents sitting in the audience, that turns out both of their mothers started to become close. Nayte soon announced that he would be moving to Minnesota to be closer with Michelle and they have already started house hunting and received a present of gingerbread which contains a down payment of US$200,000 for their future home. New Bachelor Clayton Echard appears at the hot seat and reacting several tweets seen and read from the television screen when he was first announced as the bachelor a few weeks earlier.
