= Susie Evans =

American pageant titleholder (born 1993)

- Born: Susan Christine Evans; August 19, 1993 (age 33); Poquoson, Virginia, U.S.
- Education: Lindenwood University (BA)
- Occupation: Television personality
- Height: 5 ft 8 in (1.73 m)
- Beauty pageant titleholder
- Title: Miss Virginia Teen USA 2011; Miss Virginia USA 2020
- Hair color: Blonde
- Eye color: Hazel

Susan Christine Evans (born August 19, 1993) is an American TV host and beauty pageant titleholder. She is best known for being the winner of season 26 of The Bachelor. As a beauty pageant titleholder, Evans was crowned Miss Virginia Teen USA 2011 and Miss Virginia USA 2020.

== Early life and education ==
Evans was born and raised in Poquoson, Virginia, to parents Tom and Jean Evans. She attended Lindenwood University on a full scholarship, graduating in 2015 with a Bachelor of Arts degree in digital cinema arts and broadcast communications.

After graduating from college, Evans was hired as a performer at Tokyo Disneyland, where she portrayed several Disney princesses over the course of two years. While in Japan, Evans became skilled in the art of Jiu-Jitsu, which she continued to train in after returning home to Virginia.

== Career ==
Evans was previously employed as a program manager for a marketing agency in Williamsburg, Virginia, but left her role in May 2021 to pursue her passion of photography and videography full-time.

=== Pageantry ===
Evans began competing in pageants as a teenager, where she was competed in Miss Virginia Teen USA 2011 representing Fredericksburg and won the title, she then competed in Miss Teen USA 2011, but did not place in the competition. She took a break from pageantry for several years, but returned to compete in Miss Virginia USA 2019 representing Seven Cities, where she placed second runner-up to Miss Georgia Teen USA 2012 Courtney Lynne Smits. She competed in Miss Virginia USA again the following year representing Williamsburg, and was crowned Miss Virginia USA 2020. Miss USA 2020 was originally scheduled for the spring of 2020, the competition was postponed due to the COVID-19 pandemic, and later held on November 9, 2020, but did not place.

Evans crowned her successor, Christina Thompson, in July 2021, becoming the longest reigning titleholder in the state history due to COVID delays.

=== Reality television ===
==== The Bachelor ====
In September 2021, Evans was revealed as a contestant on season 26 of The Bachelor, starring medical sales representative Clayton Echard. In the final episode, Echard chose Evans, but she rejected him. It was later revealed on the live After the Final Rose special that they had since gotten back together.

== Personal life ==
Evans was in a relationship with Clayton Echard from December 2021 to September 2022. In January 2024, Evans and Justin Glaze announced they are dating after being friends for a while. They confirmed their split on August 28, 2024.

== Filmography ==
Year	Title	Role	Notes
2011	Miss Teen USA 2011	Herself	Miss Virginia Teen USA; Unplaced
2020	Miss USA 2020	Herself	Miss Virginia USA; Unplaced
2022	The Bachelor	Herself	Contestant; season 26; Winner

Awards and achievements
Preceded by Jacqueline Carroll	Miss Virginia Teen USA; 2011	Succeeded by Elizabeth Coakley
Preceded by Courtney Lynne Smits	Miss Virginia USA; 2020	Succeeded by Christina Thompson
Preceded by Rachael Kirkconnell	The Bachelor winner Season 26	Succeeded by Kaity Biggar
