= Joe Coleman (basketball) =

American basketball player (born 1993)

Personal information
- Born: June 16, 1993 (age 33) Minneapolis, Minnesota, U.S.
- Listed height: 6 ft 4 in (1.93 m)
- Listed weight: 210 lb (95 kg)

Career information
- High school: Hopkins (Minnetonka, Minnesota)
- College: Minnesota (2011–2013); Saint Mary's (2014–2015)
- Position: Guard

Career highlights
- Minnesota Mr. Basketball (2011)

Joe Coleman (born June 16, 1993) is an American basketball player. He was named 2011 Minnesota Mr. Basketball and was a Top 100 ESPN Recruit. He was also a contestant on The Bachelorette.

== High school career ==
Coleman is a 2011 graduate from Hopkins High School. He led the school to three state championships in 2009, 2010, and 2011. In 2011, he was named Captain of the team and had a record of 32–1. After leading the team to a state championship he was then named Minnesota Mr. Basketball. During his senior year he averaged 21.5 points per game and 5.9 rebounds.

== College career ==
=== Freshman season ===
With the injury of Mo Walker and loss of senior Al Nolen, Coach Tubby Smith was looking for new recruits to fill the empty spots. He recruited Joe Coleman to play for the Minnesota Gophers. Here Joe would be able to use his athletic abilities to help the team. During much of his freshman year his points were scored in the paint. During his Gopher debut against Bucknell College Joe played 11 minutes and scored three points. On January 8, 2012 he made his first career start and finished with numerous career highs. These included 14 points, 6 rebounds, and 3 steals. Later in the season, he scored 10 points in the NIT Championship game. He also received his varsity letter at Minnesota.

=== Sophomore season ===
During the season opener of his sophomore year, Joe had a career high five steals. He had an impressive year scoring his 500th career point against UCLA on March 22, 2013. He also grabbed his 200th rebound against Iowa on February 3, 2013. During the Gophers' second-round game in NCAA tournament Joe scored 14 points, all in the second half. During his sophomore season Joe averaged 8.7 points per game and 3.6 rebounds.

=== Junior season ===
With the arrival of Richard Pitino, Joe's game may have molded well with the up and down running style, but he decided to withdraw his scholarship and transfer from the University of Minnesota to Saint Mary's College of California. He spent his junior year redshirting.

== Television career ==
=== The Bachelorette ===
Coleman appeared as a contestant on Michelle Young's season of The Bachelorette where he made it to the final three.
