= The Bachelor (American TV series) season 26 =

The Bachelor
- Season 26
- Promotional poster
- Starring: Clayton Echard
- Presented by: Jesse Palmer
- No. of contestants: 30 (31 initially)
- Winner: Susie Evans
- Runners-up: Gabby Windey; Rachel Recchia
- No. of episodes: 12

Release
- Original network: ABC
- Original release: January 3 – March 15, 2022

Additional information
- Filming dates: September 29 – November 21, 2021

Season chronology
- ← Previous; Season 25 Next → Season 27

The twenty-sixth season of The Bachelor premiered on January 3, 2022, with Jesse Palmer as host. This season featured 28-year-old Clayton Echard, a medical sales representative from Eureka, Missouri.

Echard finished in eighth place on the eighteenth season of The Bachelorette featuring Michelle Young.

The season concluded on March 15, 2022, with Echard's final choice, 28-year-old wedding videographer Susie Evans, rejecting him. Evans was the first person in the show's history to reject the lead's proposal. However, during the live After the Final Rose special, it was revealed that they had since gotten back together, and they moved in together in Virginia Beach, Virginia in April 2022. They announced their breakup on September 23, 2022.

== Production ==
=== Casting and contestants ===
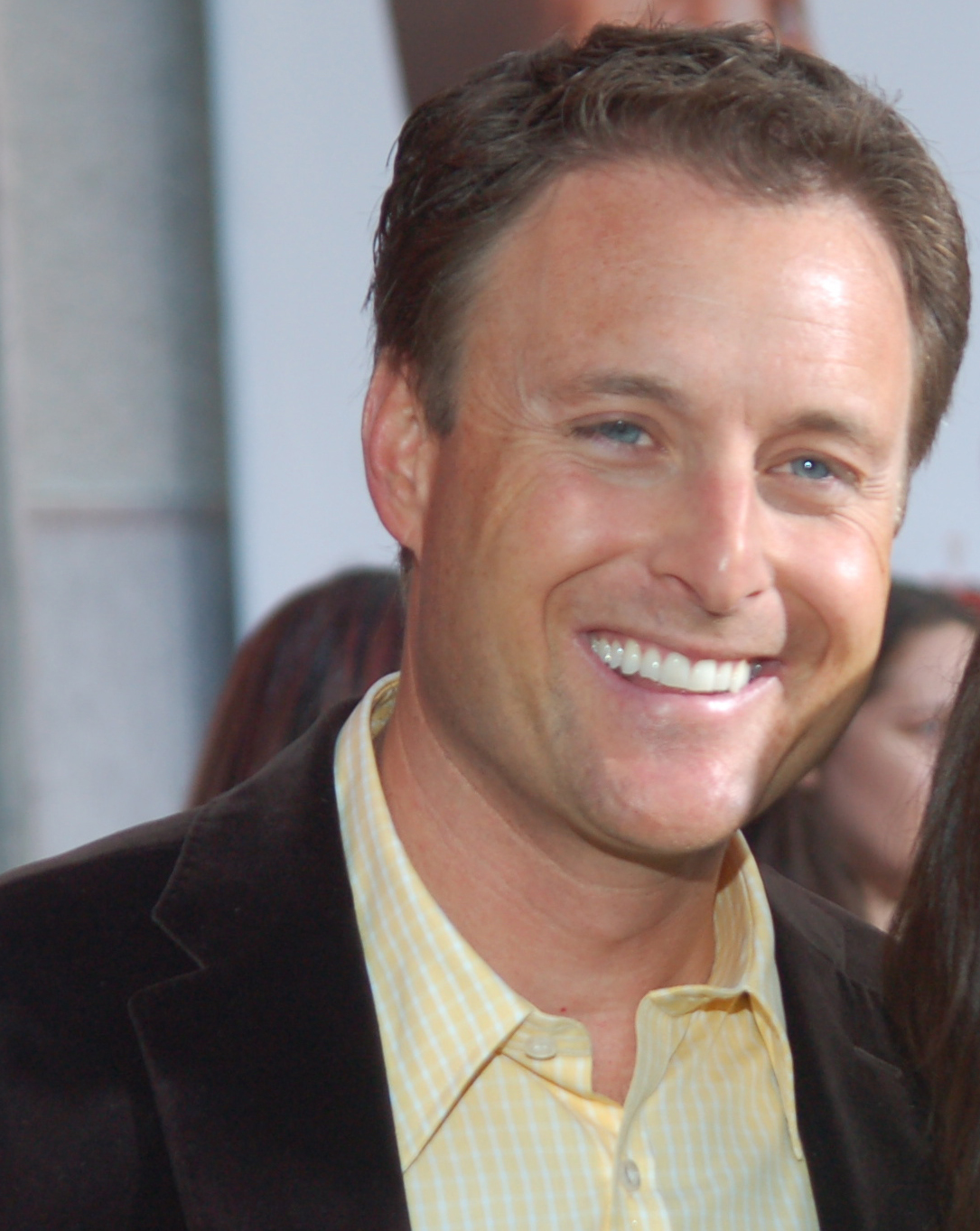
The Bachelor longtime host Chris Harrison departure from franchise by ABC after allegations over racist controversy.

In August 2021, it was reported that men from The Bachelorette who had been considered for the lead role were Tyler Cameron and Mike Johnson from season 15; Ben Smith from season 16; and Greg Grippo, Andrew Spencer and Michael Allio from season 17. Spencer and Allio eventually went on to compete in season 8 of Bachelor in Paradise.

On September 15, 2021, media outlets reported that Clayton Echard was named the Bachelor. The next day, the production crew was reported in his hometown of Eureka, Missouri filming footage for this upcoming season, just one week after the filming of season 18 had concluded. Echard was officially announced as The Bachelor on November 30, 2021.

On September 28, 2021, it was announced that season five bachelor Jesse Palmer would host the season, replacing former host Chris Harrison. Harrison departed the franchise in June following backlash after his support for Rachael Kirkconnell, the winner of the previous season, whose photos resurfaced of her attending an Antebellum South-themed party.

Notable contestants include Hurricane Sandy survivor Daria Rose; Denver Broncos cheerleader Gabby Windey, who is the ex-girlfriend of The Bachelorette and Bachelor in Paradise contestant Dean Unglert; Olympic sprinter Marlena Wesh, who represented Haiti at the 2012 Summer Olympics; Miss Virginia USA 2020 and Miss USA 2020 competitor Susie Evans; Miss South Carolina Teen 2015 and top 10 finalist at Miss America's Outstanding Teen 2016 Sarah Hamrick; Miss Teen America 2013 Lindsay Dobbs; and Oppenheim Group realtor Kate Gallivan, who appeared in the series Selling Sunset.

=== Filming and development ===
Filming began on September 29, 2021, at The Bachelor mansion in Agoura Hills, California, marking the return to the mansion for the first time since the twenty-fourth season. Filming was reported in Houston, Texas at NRG Stadium; in October 2021 in Iceland in November 2021; at Harpa Concert Hall in Reykjavík; and at Ingólfsskáli Viking Restaurant in Ölfus. Additionally, the season includes visits to Toronto, Ontario, Hvar, Croatia and Vienna, Austria. Croatia and Iceland were initially planned to visit in the sixteenth season of The Bachelorette, however, plans were cancelled at the start of the COVID-19 pandemic due to travel restrictions.

Actresses Hilary Duff and Nicole Eggert, comedians Ziwe Fumudoh and Russell Peters, former Bachelorettes Kaitlyn Bristowe and Becca Kufrin, Houston Texans players Jonathan Greenard and Kamu Grugier-Hill, and musicians Restless Road and Chris de Burgh made guest appearances this season.

== Contestants ==
33 potential contestants were revealed on September 25, 2021.

The final cast of 31 women was announced on December 15, 2021.

However, one of the contestants, Salley Carson, a 26-year-old spine-surgery robot operator from Greenville, South Carolina, made the decision to drop out of the show just hours before the limo arrived. As a result, only 30 women participated in the show.

Name	Age	Hometown	Occupation	Outcome	Place	Ref
Susie Evans	28	Poquoson, Virginia	Wedding Videographer	Winner	1	
Gabriela "Gabby" Windey	30	O'Fallon, Illinois	ICU Nurse	Runner-Up (Week 10)	2–3	
Rachel Recchia	25	Clermont, Florida	Flight Instructor	Runner-Up (Week 10)	2–3	
Susie Evans	(Returned to competition)			Week 9	(Note: Evans was originally eliminated in Week 9, but was later brought back to the competition in Week 10 after Echard's request for another chance. She rejected him at the final rose ceremony, but it was revealed on After the Final Rose that they had since gotten back together.)	
Serene Russell	26	Oklahoma City, Oklahoma	Elementary School Teacher	Week 8	4	
Teddi Wright	24	Redlands, California	Surgical Unit Nurse	Week 7	5	
Sarah Hamrick	23	Spartanburg, South Carolina	Wealth Management Advisor	Week 7	6	
Genevieve Parisi	26	Rehoboth, Massachusetts	Bartender	Week 7	7	
Eliza Isichei	25	Tampa, Florida (Note: Eliza Isichei is originally from Florida but was residing in Berlin, Germany at the time of casting and filming.)	Marketing Manager	Week 6	8–9	
Mara Agrait	32	Collingswood, New Jersey	Entrepreneur	Week 6	8–9	
Hunter Haag	28	Lake Wylie, South Carolina	Human Resources Specialist	Week 5	10–11	
Marlena Wesh	30	Virginia Beach, Virginia	Former Olympian	Week 5	10–11	
Shanae Ankney	29	Sycamore, Ohio	Recruiter	Week 5	12	
Jillian "Jill" Chin	26	Scituate, Rhode Island	Architectural Historian	Week 4	13–15	
Lyndsey Windham	28	Orange, Texas	Industrial Sales Representative	Week 4	13–15	
Sierra Jackson	26	Oklahoma City, Oklahoma	Yoga Instructor	Week 4	13–15	
Elizabeth Corrigan	32	Highlands Ranch, Colorado	Real Estate Advisor	Week 3	16–18	
Kira Mengistu	32	Greensboro, North Carolina	Physician	Week 3	16–18	
Melina Nasab	27	West Hollywood, California	Personal Trainer	Week 3	16–18	
Ency Abedin	28	Burbank, California	Sales Manager	Week 2	19–21	
Kate Gallivan	32	Clarksville, Tennessee	Real Estate Agent	Week 2	19–21	
Tessa Tookes	26	Stamford, Connecticut	Human Resources Specialist	Week 2	19–21	
Cassidy Timbrooks	26	Cave Creek, Arizona	Executive Recruiter	Week 2	22	
Daria Rose	24	Baldwin, New York	Law Student	Week 1	23–28	
Hailey Malles	26	Orlando, Florida	Pediatric Nurse	Week 1	23–28	
Ivana Noble	31	Snellville, Georgia	Bar Mitzvah Dancer	Week 1	23–28	
Jane Paik	33	Santa Monica, California	Social Media Director	Week 1	23–28	
Lindsay Dobbs	27	Warner Robins, Georgia	Neonatal Nurse	Week 1	23–28	
Rianna Hockaday	26	Mount Pleasant, Texas	Registered Nurse	Week 1	23–28	
Samantha Jeffries	26	Dayton, Ohio	Occupational Therapist	Week 1	29 (quit)	
Claire Heilig	28	Virginia Beach, Virginia	Spray Tanner	Week 1	30	

=== Future appearances ===
==== The Bachelorette ====
Rachel Recchia and Gabby Windey were chosen as co-leads for season 19 of The Bachelorette.

==== Bachelor in Paradise ====
Season 8

Eliza Isichei, Ency Abedin, Genevieve Parisi, Hailey Malles, Hunter Haag, Jill Chin, Kate Gallivan, Kira Mengistu, Lyndsey Windham, Mara Agreat, Salley Carson, Sarah Hamrick, Serene Russell, Shanae Ankney, Sierra Jackson, and Teddi Wright returned for season 8 of Bachelor in Paradise. Hunter, Hailey, and Kira were eliminated in week 1. Teddi, Sierra, and Salley quit in week 2. Kira returned in week 2 and left in a relationship with Romeo Alexander later that day. Jill and Sarah quit in week 3, the latter had to leave due to the death of a family member. Ency, Lyndsey, and Mara quit in week 5. Eliza and Kate split from Rodney Mathews and Logan Palmer, respectively, in week 5. Shanae and Genevieve split from Joey Young and Aaron Clancy, respectively, in week 6. Serene got engaged to Brandon Jones in week 6.

Season 9

Eliza, Rachel, and Samantha Jeffries returned for season 9 of Bachelor in Paradise. Samantha was medically removed in week 2. Rachel quit in week 4. Eliza got engaged to Aaron Bryant in week 5.

Season 10

Jill and Susie Evans returned for season 10 of Bachelor in Paradise. Susie rejected a rose and left in week 2. Jill quit in week 4.

==== Bachelor in Paradise Canada ====
Season 2

Rianna Hockaday and Tessa Tookes returned for the second season of Bachelor in Paradise Canada. Rianna was eliminated in week 1. Tessa got engaged to Joey Kirchner in week 6.

==== Dancing with the Stars ====
Gabby was chosen to participate in season 31 of Dancing with the Stars partnering with Val Chmerkovskiy. They finished the competition as the runner-up.

==== The Voice ====
Claire Heilig competed on the 24th season of The Voice. She was a member of Team Gwen, and was eliminated in the Battle Rounds.

==== The Traitors ====
Gabby participated in season 3 of The Traitors, ultimately being one of the co-winners of the season.

==== Perfect Match ====
Clayton Echard and Rachel participated in season 3 of Perfect Match.

== Call-out order ==
Order	Bachelorettes	Week									
Order	Bachelorettes	1	2	3	4	5	6	7	8	9	10
1	Sarah	Teddi	Susie	Eliza	Rachel	Gabby	Teddi	Susie	Susie	Rachel	Susie
2	Lyndsey W.	Serene	Sarah	Sarah	Teddi (Note: Teddi received the rose on the group date, but the segment where Clayton gave the rose to her was unaired.)	Rachel	Rachel	Serene	Gabby	Gabby	Gabby (Note: Gabby and Rachel were eliminated at the same time.); Rachel
3	Genevieve	Susie	Eliza	Gabby	Serene	Genevieve	Sarah	Rachel	Rachel	Susie	Gabby; Rachel
4	Ency	Eliza	Rachel	Marlena	Sarah	Sarah	Susie	Gabby	Serene		
5	Susie	Rachel	Serene	Teddi	Marlena	Serene	Serene	Teddi			
6	Claire	Ency	Sierra	Rachel	Genevieve	Susie	Gabby	Sarah			
7	Serene	Sarah	Teddi	Mara	Mara	Teddi	Genevieve	Genevieve			
8	Teddi	Kate	Lyndsey W.	Sierra	Gabby	Eliza	Eliza; Mara				
9	Tessa	Cassidy	Jill	Susie	Susie	Mara	Eliza; Mara				
10	Lindsay D.	Elizabeth	Gabby	Jill	Eliza	Hunter; Marlena					
11	Daria	Kira	Kira	Serene	Hunter	Hunter; Marlena					
12	Kate	Shanae	Mara	Genevieve	Shanae	Shanae					
13	Sierra	Sierra	Marlena	Hunter	Jill; Lyndsey W. Sierra						
14	Melina	Mara	Genevieve	Lyndsey W.	Jill; Lyndsey W. Sierra						
15	Hailey	Marlena	Hunter	Shanae	Jill; Lyndsey W. Sierra						
16	Jill	Genevieve	Melina	Elizabeth; Kira; Melina							
17	Marlena	Melina	Elizabeth	Elizabeth; Kira; Melina							
18	Jane	Gabby	Shanae	Elizabeth; Kira; Melina							
19	Rachel	Jill	Ency; Kate; Tessa								
20	Ivana	Lyndsey W.	Ency; Kate; Tessa								
21	Kira	Hunter	Ency; Kate; Tessa								
22	Mara	Tessa	Cassidy								
23	Rianna	Daria; Hailey; Ivana; Jane; Lindsay D. Rianna									
24	Eliza	Daria; Hailey; Ivana; Jane; Lindsay D. Rianna									
25	Gabby	Daria; Hailey; Ivana; Jane; Lindsay D. Rianna									
26	Elizabeth	Daria; Hailey; Ivana; Jane; Lindsay D. Rianna									
27	Hunter	Daria; Hailey; Ivana; Jane; Lindsay D. Rianna									
28	Samantha	Daria; Hailey; Ivana; Jane; Lindsay D. Rianna									
29	Cassidy	Samantha									
30	Shanae	Claire									

The contestant received the first impression rose
The contestant received a rose during the date
The contestant was eliminated
The contestant was eliminated outside the rose ceremony
The contestant was eliminated during the date
The contestant initially received a rose during the date, but was eliminated
The contestant initially rejected a rose, but later accepted it
The contestant quit the competition

== Episodes ==
No. overall	No. in season	Title	Original release date	Prod. code	U.S. viewers (millions)	Rating (18–49)
264	1	"Week 1: Season Premiere"	January 3, 2022	2601	3.54	0.8/4
Clayton arrives at his mother's house and surprises her with the news that he is the next bachelor. The 30 contestants prepare for the first night. Entrances include Sarah presenting a pin from Clemson University; Susie holding a buzzer to shock Clayton's right hand; Kate presenting two mini-bottles of whiskey, hidden in her dress; Sierra's reference to Back to the Future; Melina bouncing in modified kangaroo boots; Marlena throwing a penalty flag; Jane driving a vintage car, and Kira in a sexy doctor's uniform. Clayton has one-on-one time with Susie, and Elizabeth shows him a picture of her great-grandfather. Teddi tells him that she became interested in him after he was solicitous about Michelle's cast on The Bachelorette. Kira gives him a check-up, and Eliza gives him a German language lesson. Claire surprises Clayton with a tailgate party, but gets drunk and says that she hates him; he sends her home. Genevieve tells Clayton that she is close to her parents, and Rachel offers to teach him how to fly a plane. He give the first-impression rose to Teddi, and Daria, Hailey, Ivana, Jane, Lindsay D., Rianna, and Samantha are sent home.
265	2	"Week 2"	January 10, 2022	2602	3.19	0.7/3
On the season's first group date, Teddi, Ency, Melina, Gabby, Kira, Mara, Sierra, Genevieve, Serene, and Cassidy go to a Beverly Hills mansion and meet Hilary Duff to help plan a children's birthday party. Genevieve decorates a cake for Maya, and Cassidy drops it on the lawn when she brings it to her. The women talk about Cassidy, and Serene tells Clayton that she is a teacher who loves children. Teddi and Clayton kiss, and Genevieve makes him another cake. Cassidy receives the group-date rose. On the season's first one-on-one date, Clayton takes Susie to a seaside cliff and on a helicopter ride. On a yacht in downtown Los Angeles, they relax in a hot tub with a glass of champagne and plunge into the Pacific Ocean. Susie tells Clayton about her father's health problems and their effect on her parents' relationship, and accepts his rose. Shanae, Marlena, Elizabeth, Kate, Sarah, Lyndsey, Rachel, and Tessa are the week's second group date, and meet Ziwe Fumudoh for a relationship-red-flags challenge. Shanae and Elizabeth quarrel, and Sarah wins the challenge. Eliza shows Clayton her scrapbook of their journey together, and the episode has a cliffhanger ending.
266	3	"Week 3"	January 24, 2022	2603	3.61	0.8/4
Cassidy admits lying, and Clayton sends her home; he also sends Ency, Kate, and Tessa home. Serene, Susie, Eliza, Marlena, Mara, Genevieve, Hunter, and Jill, on a group date, have a therapy session with season 11 bachelorette Kaitlyn Bristowe. Hunter talks about her ex-boyfriend's infidelity, Serene about her struggle with anorexia, and Mara about being bullied at school. At the after-party, he gives Eliza a group-date rose. Sarah has the one-on-one date, and she and Clayton meet season 14 bachelorette Becca Kufrin for a scavenger hunt in Los Angeles. They go for a long run in a park, smash piñatas and go to the Van Gogh Exhibit Los Angeles, where Sarah talks about her adoption and receives the date rose. Gabby, Rachel, Kira, Melina, Teddi, Lyndsey, Sierra, Elizabeth, and Shanae are chosen for the second group date at Will Rogers State Beach, where Nicole Eggert gives them two tasks for a Baywatch training challenge; they test sunscreen and practice CPR. At Clifton's Cabinet of Curiosities, Gabby treats Clayton's sunburn. Shanae tells him about problems with Elizabeth, who tells him about Shanae's disrespect. Gabby receives the group-date rose.
267	4	"Week 4: Houston, Texas"	January 31, 2022	2604	3.54	0.8/4
Clayton talks to Shanae and Elizabeth; Elizabeth, Kira, and Melina are sent home. Jesse announces that they are going to Houston. Clayton is surprised to see Clarence Green, his former Missouri Tigers football teammate, visiting their hotel and they catch up. Rachel has a date with Clayton in Willis, Texas, where they ride horses to a farmhouse for a barbecue, and see the band Restless Road. Sierra, Gabby, and Genevieve discuss Shanae and her behavior. Sarah, Eliza, Teddi, Marlena, Jill, Susie, Mara, Sierra, Hunter, Lyndsey, Genevieve, Gabby, and Shanae are chosen for a group date at NRG Stadium. Clayton throws a tailgate party. Houston Texans players Jonathan Greenard and Kamu Grugier-Hill divide them into two teams of seven and six: the Purple Punishers and the Shrimp Stampede. Jesse and Hannah Storm provide the commentary. The Punishers shut out the Stampede 21–0, and are invited to an after-party at Hughes Manor. Teddi shows Clayton her left knee, which was injured during the game, and Sierra asks him to ensure that Shanae is on the show for the right reasons. Shanae crashes the Punishers' party, interrupts Clayton's conversation with Sarah, insults Genevieve and Sierra, and throws the trophy before leaving.
268	5	"Week 5: Toronto"	February 7, 2022 (Note: Week 5 and Week 6 were aired during the 2022 Winter Olympics.)	2605	3.14	0.7/3
Susie, Rachel, and Jill discuss Shanae's behavior. Serene goes to Galveston Island Historic Pleasure Pier to meet Clayton, who used to work there; they eat ice-cream cones, go on a ride, and play games. She talks about her recent loss of two family members and her upbringing by a single mother. Clayton talks to last week's group date, and Sierra tells him about Shanae's behavior. Clayton pulls Shanae aside; she apologizes for throwing the trophy and apologizes to the others. Jill, Lyndsey, and Sierra are sent home, and Clayton announces that he and the 12 women are going to Toronto. Gabby and Clayton take a helicopter ride over downtown Toronto, play street hockey and eat fried dough. Gabby talks about her life and her closeness to her mother, and she and Clayton take a night swim. The group date takes Rachel, Sarah, Serene, Marlena, Susie, Hunter, Eliza, Teddi, and Mara to the Distillery District. The women perform stand-up comedy; most refer to Shanae, who is not there. Shanae and Genevieve have the season's first two-on-one date. Shanae is a little worried when they arrive at Niagara Falls; they board a boat, and the episode has a cliffhanger ending.
269	6	"Week 6: Croatia"	February 14, 2022	2606	3.25	0.7/3
Genevieve, Shanae and Clayton picnic on the Dufferin Islands, and Genevieve apologizes to Shanae. Shanae apologizes to Clayton, who gives each woman a rose and sends Shanae home. Rachel and Clayton kiss; Hunter and Marlena are sent home, and Clayton announces that the remaining women are going to Hvar, Croatia. They explore the old town; Clayton meets them for lunch, and picks Teddi for the one-on-one date. They stroll around Hvar; Teddi tells Clayton that she is a virgin, and has never been in love. Serene, Rachel, Susie, Gabby, Eliza, Genevieve, and Mara are chosen for the group date; Mara is discouraged because she has not had a one-on-one date. The women accept a challenge and meet Katrina; Serene wins. Clayton prepares for hometown dates, and asks each women about their hometown. Rachel is eager for Clayton to meet her family; Mara is ready to marry, but is not connecting with Clayton. Sarah has the second one-on-one date. Clayton expresses his concern that she is young and may not be ready for marriage, and Sarah starts to cry. Clayton apologizes, and walks away. He returns, and many of the women are relieved to see Sarah return to the hotel.
270	7	"Week 7: Vienna, Austria"	February 21, 2022	2607	3.49	0.7/3
Eliza and Mara are sent home. The women explore Vienna, and Susie has her second one-on-one date: to Innere Stadt. She and Clayton shop for clothes at Fisher's; after Susie returns to the hotel, a bellboy arrives with a red Eva Poleschinski dress. At Schönbrunn Palace, Susie tells Clayton about her life; he gives her a rose, and Chris de Burgh serenades them with "The Lady in Red". In the season's final group date, Genevieve, Sarah, Teddi, Rachel, and Gabby have couples-therapy sessions with Dr. Katherine and Clayton. Teddi talks about her childhood, and Genevieve looks miserable as she talks about her feelings; Clayton sends her home. Sarah has a difficult session; Clayton talks to her at Palais Modena, and sends her home crying. Serene has the season's final one-on-one date. She and Clayton ride in a fiacre from Hofburg Palace to explore Innere Stadt. Over dinner in Belvedere Palace, Serene talks about her past relationships. Clayton gives her a rose, and they reenact Gustav Klimt's The Kiss in front of the painting. Rachel and Gabby receive roses, and Teddi is sent home.
271	8	"Week 8: Hometowns"	February 28, 2022	2608	3.71	0.8
Clayton visits Poquoson, Virginia to meet Susie. She tells him about her father's health, and invites him to meet her family and her best friend. Clayton tells Susie's mother that he is fond of her, and Susie says that she and Clayton are falling in love. The next hometown date is with Gabby in Denver; her father cannot be there because his girlfriend has cancer and cannot risk being exposed to COVID-19. Clayton meets Gabby's grandfather, aunt, uncle, and cousin. Gabby runs outside when she hears a car horn, and her father holds up a sign to greet her. Serene meets Clayton in Oklahoma City. He conquers his fear of heights with a free-fall ride and meets her mother, brother, and best friend. Serene and her mother talk about the deaths of her cousin and grandmother. Clayton meets Rachel for her hometown date in Clermont, Florida, where they go kayaking on a creek with alligators and spiders to a "kissing tree". He meets Rachel's mother, father and two best friends, and talks about Rachel's love of flying; Rachel tells her father that she is falling in love. Serene is sent home, and Clayton accompanies her to the exit.
272	9	"The Women Tell All"	March 7, 2022	N/A	3.63	0.9/7
Sixteen of the twenty-seven eliminated contestants are onstage, and old rivalries and hostilities are revived. Teddi, Shanae, Sarah, and Serene are interviewed by Jesse, and Shanae and Genevieve reconciled after a controversial two-on-one date. Clayton appears onstage, and Jesse reviews his bachelor journey. The episode ends with bloopers.
273	10	"Week 9: Fantasy Suites"	March 8, 2022	2609	3.50	0.8/5
Clayton arrives in Reykjavík for overnight dates with the three remaining women. He and Rachel take a helicopter ride over the Fagradalsfjall volcano and Reykjanes Peninsula; they kiss and descend 400 feet (120 m), below the dormant volcano. Rachel tells Clayton that she is falling in love with him, and he tells her the next morningl that he is in love with her. Gabby and Clayton ride an ATV to a nearby café in Suðurland. They have dinner at Hafið Bláa in Eyrarbakki and enjoy a hot tub at Reykjavik Domes. Clayton tells Gabby that he is falling in love with her. Susie meets Clayton at Sky Lagoon, where they enjoy a sauna and cool plunge and kiss at a waterfall. At a villa in Thingvellir National Park, Clayton tells Susie that he is in love with her. She tells him that she will not stay with him if he had been intimate with either of the other women. Clayton admits that he was; they argue and break up, with Clayton walking Susie to the car. Susie wishes that the conversation had been kinder and more mature, and Clayton does not know how he feels.
274	11	"Week 10: Season Finale"	March 14, 2022	2610A	4.57	1.1/8
The day after Clayton’s date with Susie, Clayton is in the Hallgrímskirkja church. He and Jesse talk at Austurvöllur. At the Harpa concert hall, Rachel and Gabby notice that Susie is missing. Clayton tells them that he is in love with Susie and was intimate with them, and is in love with them both. The women walk out, crying; Rachel says that she thought she was special. They talk separately to Clayton, who apologizes and hopes they can reconcile. Clayton meets his family (his father Brian, his mother Kelly, and his brothers Nate and Patrick) at a rented house outside Reykjavík. Clayton tells them about his overnight date with Susie and subsequent events. His parents are upset. Gabby and Rachel meet Clayton's family. Clayton talks about his relationships with Gabby and Rachel as he thinks about his relationship with Susie. Jesse tells him that Susie is still in Iceland, and he realizes that he has a chance to win her back.
275	12	"After the Final Rose"	March 15, 2022	2610B	4.73	1.1/8
Jesse asks Susie if she wants to talk with Clayton. Susie meets Clayton’s parents at the rental home; she and Clayton talk privately, and he apologizes. She returns to the hotel. The next day, Clayton writes to Susie and tells Rachel and Gabby that he is in love with her. Gabby walks away angrily, saying that she cannot trust him, and Rachel is heartbroken. On the final day, Clayton has a box with an engagement ring, Susie receives a letter from Clayton, and reads it as he arrives at a restaurant. It is a proposal, which she declines. Weeks after filming ended, Clayton resumed his normal life. Four months have passed; Susie says that she protected herself after she left Iceland, and she and Clayton are back together. Clayton says that he is going to Virginia for a few days; he has left his job and sold his condo. He gives Susie a rose instead of a marriage proposal, and Jesse announces that the next bachelorettes will be Gabby and Rachel.

== Controversy ==
Shanae Ankney came under fire for alleged ableist comments to Elizabeth Corrigan, who has ADHD. When Corrigan claimed she could not process things to the same ability as others due to her condition, Ankney mocked her and even accused her of staging her condition. Corrigan responded by posting a TikTok video about mental health after the airing of the episode. During the airing of the season, Echard released a public apology to Corrigan, stating that he would have sent Ankney home immediately had he known about her comments. However, contestants Lyndsey Windham and Sierra Jackson disputed Echard's claims stating that he knew Ankney mocked Corrigan and kept Ankney anyway.
