= Clayton Echard =

American reality star and football player

No. 85
- Position: Tight end

Personal information
- Born: April 29, 1993 (age 33); Eureka, Missouri, U.S.
- Listed height: 6 ft 5 in (1.96 m)
- Listed weight: 261 lb (118 kg)

Career information
- High school: Eureka
- College: Missouri
- NFL draft: 2016: undrafted

Career history
- Seattle Seahawks (2016)*
- * Offseason or practice squad member only

Clayton Ray Echard (born April 29, 1993) is an American television personality best known for his appearances as a contestant on season 18 of The Bachelorette, and as the star of season 26 of The Bachelor. He played college football for Missouri and spent training camp with the Seattle Seahawks of the National Football League (NFL) in 2016.

== Early life and education ==
Echard was born on April 29, 1993, in Eureka, Missouri, to parents Brian and Kelly. He has two brothers, Nate and Patrick. He began playing football in the sixth grade. He was a wide receiver during his junior year at Eureka High School, weighing 170 pounds, before shifting to a defensive lineman and gaining 30 pounds for the role as a senior. He graduated from high school in 2011. Though he did not receive any scholarship offers, Echard was selected as a walk-on member of the Missouri Tigers football team at the start of his first year at the University of Missouri. At the University of Missouri, he studied health sciences and minored in Spanish and business, receiving a bachelor's degree in 2015.

== Career ==
=== College and professional football ===
Echard redshirted his freshman year and played one game during the 2012 season. He was named to the Southeastern Conference academic honor roll for 2012. At the start of the 2013 season, Echard was moved from defensive end to tight end. He played 12 games and recorded one assisted tackle.

He played in both offensive and defensive positions in all 14 games during the 2014 season, eventually settling as tight end, which he continued to play during the 2015 season. He made two receptions for 14 yards with one start in 2015.

Pre-draft measurables
Height	Weight	Arm length	Hand span	40-yard dash	10-yard split	20-yard split	20-yard shuttle	Three-cone drill	Vertical jump	Broad jump	Bench press
6 ft 4 in (1.93 m)	261 lb (118 kg)	32 7/8 in (0.84 m)	10 3/8 in (0.26 m)	4.87 s	1.71 s	2.81 s	4.64 s	7.24 s	30.0 in (0.76 m)	9 ft 8 in (2.95 m)	20 reps
All values from Pro Day

Echard signed with the Seattle Seahawks of the National Football League as a tight end in July 2016, but was cut from the team before the start of the regular season in September 2016.

Echard worked as a sales representative for Stryker Corporation, a medical device company, in 2016. He is currently a real estate agent in Scottsdale.

=== The Bachelorette ===
Echard first appeared as a contestant on Michelle Young's season of The Bachelorette. He was first announced as a potential contestant for the season, along with 34 other men, in July 2021. He finished in eighth place.

=== The Bachelor ===
In September 2021, Variety and other sources reported that Echard was cast as the star of season 26 of The Bachelor. On September 16, he spoke to fans of the franchise in his hometown, saying that he was "excited" and "a little nervous". Echard was officially confirmed by ABC on November 30, 2021. The season premiered on January 3, 2022. In the final episode, Echard chose Susie Evans, but she rejected him. It was later revealed on the live After the Final Rose special that they had since gotten back together.

=== Love Trapped ===
Echard was the primary subject of the first season of the IHeartRadio podcast Love Trapped, which released its first episode on February 26, 2026. The podcast, hosted by reporter Stephani Young, documented the true crime story of Echard's dalliance and subsequent legal battle with Laura Michelle Owens, who claimed that she had a miscarriage after carrying Echard's baby. Owens eventually admitted in court that she had faked pregnancy with Echard and multiple other men over many years.

The podcast was the number 1 on Apple Podcasts after launching, and was among Apple's top ten podcasts for thirty weeks.

== Personal life ==
Echard was in a relationship with Susie Evans from December 2021 to September 2022.

In May 2023, Laura Michelle Owens of Scottsdale, Arizona claimed to be pregnant with Clayton Echard's unborn twins. After 10 months of litigation, Judge Julie Mata granted Echard's Petition for Non-Paternity and attorney fees. The case attracted significant media attention; in particular, Owens' claim to have been pregnant was heavily doubted. Owens, the daughter of San Francisco radio host Ronn Owens, was subsequently charged by the Maricopa County district attorney with fraud, forgery, perjury, and tampering of evidence related to her false paternity claims. On August 28, 2026, Owens accepted a plea deal and pled guilty to multiple charges, including fraudulent schemes and artifices, perjury, and taking the identity of another. She was sentenced to 30 days in jail in Arizona, plus seven years of probation.

Preceded by Matt James	The Bachelor; Season 26 (2022)	Succeeded by Zach Shallcross
