= List of Sigma Kappa members =

Sigma Kappa is a North American college sorority that was founded in 1874 at Colby College in Waterville, Maine. The following is a list of some of the notable members of the sorority.

== Business ==
- Laura Deming (Theta Lambda) – 2011 Thiel Fellow and venture capitalist

== Entertainment ==
- Connie Britton (Zeta Lambda) – actor
- Lindsay Czarniak (Delta Rho) – sports anchor and reporter at ESPN
- Nina Davuluri (Alpha Mu) – Miss New York 2014, Miss America 2014
- Tara Gray (Theta Xi) – Miss Alabama USA 2002
- Kate Michael (Epsilon Epsilon) – Miss District of Columbia USA 2006
- Maitland Ward (Gamma Theta) – actress in Boy Meets World, The Bold and the Beautiful, and White Chicks
- Charity Lawson (Theta Xi) - season 20 Bachelorette, and season 32 Dancing with the Stars contestant

== Literature ==
- Mary Jane Clark (Phi) – author
- Glennon Doyle (Delta Rho) – author and public speaker
- Judith Guest (Alpha Mu) – author of Ordinary People

== Politics ==
- Susan Eisenhower (Epsilon Epsilon) – expert on international security, space policy, energy, and Russia–United States relations; granddaughter of U.S. President Dwight Eisenhower
- Susan Johns (Alpha Chi) – former member of the Kentucky Senate (1990–1994) and Kentucky House of Representatives (1996–2000)
- Margaret Chase Smith (Alpha) – first woman to sit in both houses of the United States Congress; recipient of Presidential Medal of Freedom
- Sarah Weddington (Zeta Nu) – attorney for Norma McCorvey in Roe v. Wade and member of the Texas House of Representatives

== Science ==
- Margaret Rhea Seddon (Lambda) – retired NASA astronaut, surgeon
- Marjorie Townsend (Zeta) – first woman to manage a spacecraft launch for NASA

== Sports ==
- Theresa Grentz (Theta) – 1992 coach of the bronze medal-winning United States women's national basketball team; former women's head basketball coach at University of Illinois and Rutgers
- Anna McCune Harper (Lambda) – 1931 Wimbledon Mixed Doubles Champion and professional tennis player
- Nancy Lopez (Theta Xi) – professional golfer
- Angela Stanford (Kappa Eta) – professional golfer
