= Bachelor in Paradise (American TV series) season 9 =

Bachelor in Paradise
- Season 9
- Promotional poster
- No. of episodes: 10

Release
- Original network: ABC
- Original release: September 28 – December 7, 2023

Season chronology
- ← Previous; Season 8 Next → Season 10

The ninth season of Bachelor in Paradise premiered on September 28, 2023, with Jesse Palmer returning as host.

== Production ==
Filming took place in the town of Sayulita, located in Nayarit, Mexico. Wells Adams returned as the bartender for the sixth season in a row.

For the first time, the season was moved from its usual Monday and Tuesday timeslot to Thursday following the inaugural season of The Golden Bachelor, on account of the 2023 Writers Guild of America strike.

Former Bachelorettes Hannah Brown, Katie Thurston, and Charity Lawson made guest appearances this season.

=== Casting ===
On August 14, 2023, Brayden Bowers and Katherine Izzo were confirmed as contestants during the Bachelorette season 20 Men Tell All special.

On August 21, 2023, Aaron Bryant, Brooklyn Willie, and former Bachelorette Rachel Recchia were confirmed as contestants during the Bachelorette season 20 After the Final Rose special. Recchia is the second ever lead to return as a contestant on Paradise, after Becca Kufrin on season 7.

The rest of the original cast was announced on August 25, 2023.

== Contestants ==
Name	Age	Residence	From	Arrived	Outcome
Aaron Bryant	30	San Diego, California	The Bachelorette – Charity	Week 1	Engaged
Eliza Isichei	27	Berlin, Germany	The Bachelor – Clayton; Bachelor in Paradise – Season 8	Week 1	Engaged
John Henry Spurlock	31	Wilmington, North Carolina	The Bachelorette – Charity	Week 2	Engaged
Kat Izzo	27	Tampa, Florida	The Bachelor – Zach	Week 1	Engaged
Aven Jones	29	San Diego, California	The Bachelorette – Gabby & Rachel	Week 1	Relationship
Kylee Russell	25	Charlotte, North Carolina	The Bachelor – Zach	Week 1	Relationship
Michael Barbour	29	Chicago, Illinois	The Bachelorette – Charity	Week 4	Split Week 5
Olivia Lewis	24	Rochester, New York	The Bachelor – Zach	Week 1	Split Week 5
Peter Cappio	33	New York City, New York	The Bachelorette – Charity	Week 1	Split Week 5
Samantha "Sam" Picco	34	St. John's, Newfoundland and Labrador	Bachelor in Paradise Canada – Season 2	Week 2	Split Week 5
Jordan Vandergriff	28	Alpharetta, Georgia	The Bachelorette – Gabby & Rachel	Week 4	Split Week 5
Mercedes Northup	25	Nashville, Tennessee	The Bachelor – Zach	Week 1	Split Week 5
Tanner Courtad	30	Pittsburgh, Pennsylvania	The Bachelorette – Charity	Week 2	Split Week 5
Jess Girod	24	Winter Springs, Florida	The Bachelor – Zach	Week 1	Split Week 5
Brayden Bowers	25	San Diego, California	The Bachelorette – Charity	Week 1	Week 4
Taylor Pegg	32	Beavercreek, Ohio	The Bachelorette – Charity	Week 4	Week 4
Rachel Recchia	27	Los Angeles, California	The Bachelor – Clayton; The Bachelorette – Season 19	Week 1	Week 4 (Quit)
Tyler Norris	26	San Diego, California	The Bachelorette – Gabby & Rachel; Bachelor in Paradise – Season 8	Week 2	Week 4 (Quit)
Blake Moynes	32	Hamilton, Ontario	The Bachelorette – Clare & Tayshia; The Bachelorette – Katie	Week 1	Week 4 (Quit)
Davia Bunch	26	Charleston, South Carolina	The Bachelor – Zach	Week 3	Week 3
Genevie Mayo	26	Baltimore, Maryland	The Bachelor – Zach	Week 3	Week 3
Becca Serrano	26	Burbank, California	The Bachelor – Zach	Week 3	Week 3 (Quit)
Aaron Schwartzman	34	San Diego, California	The Bachelorette – Charity	Week 1	Week 2
John Buresh	27	New York City, New York	The Bachelorette – Charity	Week 2	Week 2
Sean McLaughlin	26	Tampa, Florida	The Bachelorette – Charity	Week 1	Week 2
Will Urena	30	Grand Rapids, Michigan	The Bachelorette – Michelle	Week 1	Week 2
Samantha "Sam" Jeffries	27	Dayton, Ohio	The Bachelor – Clayton	Week 1	Week 2 (MD)
Brooklyn Willie	25	Stillwater, Oklahoma	The Bachelor – Zach	Week 1	Week 1
Cat Wong	26	Brooklyn, New York	The Bachelor – Zach	Week 1	Week 1
Greer Blitzer	25	New York City, New York	The Bachelor – Zach	Week 1	Week 1

== Elimination table ==
Place	Contestant	Week				
Place	Contestant	1	2	3	4	5
1-4	Aaron B.	In	In	In	In	Engaged
1-4	Eliza	In	Date	In	In	Engaged
1-4	John Henry	Wait	Date	In	In	Engaged
1-4	Kat I.	In	Date	In	In	Engaged
5-6	Aven	Date	In	In	Date	Relationship
5-6	Kylee	Date	In	In	Date	Relationship
7-8	Michael	Wait			Date	Split
7-8	Olivia	Last	Date	Last	Date	Split
9-10	Peter	In	Last	In	Date	Split
9-10	Sam P.	Wait	In	In	Date	Split
11-12	Jordan	Wait			Last	Split
11-12	Mercedes	In	Date	In	In	Split
13-14	Tanner	Wait	Date	Date	In	Split
13-14	Jess	In	In	In	In	Split
15-16	Brayden	In	In	Date	Out	
15-16	Taylor	Wait			Out	
17	Rachel	In	In	Date	Quit	
18	Tyler	Wait	Date	In	Quit	
19	Blake	In	In	Date	Quit	
20-21	Davia	Wait		Out		
20-21	Genevie	Wait		Out		
22	Becca	Wait		Quit		
23-26	Aaron S.	In	Out			
23-26	John B.	Wait	Out			
23-26	Sean	In	Out			
23-26	Will	Date	Out			
27	Sam J.	In	Out			
28-30	Brooklyn	Out				
28-30	Cat W.	Out				
28-30	Greer	Out				

=== Key ===
The contestant is male
The contestant is female
Date The contestant went on a date and gave out a rose at the rose ceremony
Date The contestant went on a date and got a rose at the rose ceremony
In The contestant gave or received a rose at the rose ceremony, thus remaining in the competition
Last The contestant received the last rose
Last The contestant went on a date and received the last rose
Out The contestant went on a date and was eliminated
Out The contestant was eliminated
Quit The contestant had a date and voluntarily left the show
Quit The contestant voluntarily left the show
Out The contestant was medically evacuated.
Split The couple broke up and was eliminated
Split The couple had a date, then broke up and was eliminated
Split The contestant split after Bachelor in Paradise ended
Stay The couple decided to stay together and won the competition
Wait The contestant had to wait before appearing in paradise
Split/Stay The contestant split then started dating again after paradise
Split/Stay The contestant split before a rose ceremony and started dating again after BIP ended

== Episodes ==
No. overall	No. in season	Title	Original release date	Prod. code	U.S. viewers (millions)	Rating/share (18–49)
91	1	"Episode 1: Season Premiere"	September 28, 2023	901	2.08	0.4
Arrivals: Rachel, Aaron B., Brooklyn, Cat W., Sean, Will, Kylee, Brayden, Eliza, Greer, Mercedes, Aaron S., Peter, Kat I., Sam J., Olivia, Jess, and Blake. Date Card: Kylee; Kylee's Date: Will; New Arrival: Aven
92	2	"Episode 2"	October 5, 2023	902	2.00	0.4
Aven's Date: Kylee; Rose Ceremony: Brayden gave his rose to Kat I., Blake gave his rose to Jess, Aaron B. gave his rose to Eliza, Will gave his rose to Mercedes, Sean gave his rose to Rachel, Aven gave his rose to Kylee, Aaron S. gave his rose to Sam J., and Peter gave his rose to Olivia. Brooklyn, Cat W., and Greer did not receive a rose and were sent home.
93	3	"Episode 3"	October 12, 2023	903	1.89	0.3
New Arrival: Tanner; Tanner's Date: Kat; New Arrival: Tyler; Tyler's Date: Mercedes
94	4	"Episode 4"	October 19, 2023	904	1.99	0.3
Departure: Sam J. New Arrival: John Henry; John Henry's Date: Olivia; New Arrival: John B. John B's Date: Eliza
95	5	"Episode 5"	October 26, 2023	905	1.91	0.3
New Arrival: Sam P. Rose Ceremony: Kylee gave her rose to Aven, Rachel gave her rose to Brayden, Eliza gave her rose to Aaron B., Kat gave her rose to Tanner, Jess gave her rose to Blake, Olivia gave her rose to John Henry, Mercedes gave her rose to Tyler, and Sam P. gave her rose to Peter. Aaron S., John B., Sean, and Will did not receive a rose and were sent home. Date Card: Rachel; Rachel's Date: Brayden; New Arrival: Davia; Davia's Date: Tanner
96	6	"Episode 6"	November 2, 2023	906	1.96	0.3
New Arrival: Genevie; Genevie's Date: Blake; New Arrival: Becca; Becca's Date: Brayden
97	7	"Episode 7"	November 9, 2023	907	1.93	0.3
Departure: Becca; Rose Ceremony: Aven gave his rose to Kylee, Tyler gave his rose to Mercedes, Peter gave his rose to Sam P., Aaron B. gave his rose to Eliza, Blake gave his rose to Jess, Tanner gave his rose to Rachel, John Henry gave his rose to Kat, and Brayden gave his rose to Olivia. Davia and Genevie did not receive a rose and were sent home. New Arrival: Michael
98	8	"Episode 8"	November 16, 2023	908	2.24	0.4
Michael's Date: Olivia; New Arrivals: Jordan and Taylor; Jordan's Date: Rachel; Double Date Card: Aven & Peter; Aven & Peter's Dates: Kylee & Sam P.
99	9	"Episode 9"	November 30, 2023	909	2.25	0.3
Departure: Blake; Departure: Tyler; Departure: Rachel; Rose Ceremony: Eliza gave her rose to Aaron B., Kat gave her rose to John Henry, Kylee gave her rose to Aven, Olivia gave her rose to Michael, Sam P. gave her rose to Peter, Jess gave her rose to Tanner, and Mercedes gave her rose to Jordan. Rachel forfeited her rose during the ceremony. Brayden and Taylor did not receive a rose and were sent home.
100	10	"Season Finale"	December 7, 2023	910	1.74	0.3
Date Card: John Henry & Kat; Date Card: Aaron B. & Eliza; Departures: Tanner & Jess break up. Jordan & Mercedes break up. Aven & Kylee decide to stay together and leave as a couple. Peter & Sam P. break up. Michael & Olivia break up. Commitment Ceremony #1: Aaron B. proposes to Eliza and they get engaged. Commitment Ceremony #2: John Henry proposes to Kat and they get engaged.
