= The Bachelorette (American TV series) season 19 =

The Bachelorette
- Season 19
- Promotional poster
- Starring: Rachel Recchia; Gabby Windey
- Presented by: Jesse Palmer
- No. of contestants: 32
- Winners: Tino Franco; Erich Schwer
- Runner-up: Aven Jones
- No. of episodes: 12

Release
- Original network: ABC
- Original release: July 11 – September 20, 2022

Additional information
- Filming dates: March 26 – May 13, 2022

Season chronology
- ← Previous; Season 18 Next → Season 20

The nineteenth season of The Bachelorette (promoted as The Bachelorettes) premiered on July 11, 2022. This season features 26-year-old Rachel Recchia, a flight instructor from Clermont, Florida, and 31-year-old Gabby Windey, an ICU nurse from O'Fallon, Illinois.

Recchia and Windey were the co-runners-up on the 26th season of The Bachelor featuring Clayton Echard.

The season concluded on September 20, 2022, with Recchia accepting a proposal from 28-year-old general contractor Tino Franco. They broke up while the season was airing when it was revealed Franco cheated on her. During the live finale, runner-up Aven Jones asked Recchia on a date, and she said yes, but they decided not to pursue a relationship. Windey accepted a proposal from 29-year-old real estate analyst Erich Schwer, but their breakup was announced on November 4, 2022. On August 2, 2023, Windey came out on The View and mentioned that she was in a relationship with a woman named Robby Hoffman. Windey is the first Bachelorette lead to publicly announce a same sex relationship.

This is the third American edition of The Bachelorette to feature two leads following the eleventh and sixteenth seasons; however, unlike those seasons, this is the first American Bachelorette season to have both Bachelorettes co-lead the entire season. This has already occurred with the first season of The Bachelorette New Zealand featuring Lesina Nakhid-Schuster and Lily McManus, and the sixth season of The Bachelorette Australia featuring sisters Becky and Elly Miles.

== Production ==
=== Casting and contestants ===
On March 15, 2022, Recchia and Windey were announced as the Bachelorettes by Jesse Palmer during the After the Final Rose special of the 26th season of The Bachelor.

All contestants and crew members were required to be fully vaccinated from COVID-19 and hold a current vaccination passport to participate.

Notable contestants include NHRA drag racer Jordan Vandergriff, nephew of retired drag racer Bob Vandergriff Jr; Roby Sobieski, brother of former actress and artist Leelee Sobieski; Zach Shallcross, nephew of actor Patrick Warburton; and Kirk Bryant, assistant football coach at Texas Tech University.

=== Filming and development ===
Former Bachelor Jesse Palmer was confirmed as the permanent host for the series, replacing interim hosts Tayshia Adams and Kaitlyn Bristowe. Filming began on March 26, 2022, in Agoura Hills, California. This was the first The Bachelorette season to return to the Bachelor Mansion since season 15, after production of the previous three seasons was affected by the COVID-19 pandemic. Filming was reported in France, Belgium, and the Netherlands onboard the Virgin Voyages Valiant Lady cruise ship across the English Channel and North Sea. Additionally, filming occurred at The Wildwoods in Wildwood, New Jersey on April 25, 2022, for Tyler Norris' hometown date with Recchia. With the final portion of filming taking place in Mexico and concluded in mid-May.

The season was delayed from its usual May start for the second time in three years to accommodate for ABC's coverage of the NBA Finals and Stanley Cup Final.

The rose ceremonies are conducted differently than in previous seasons. In week 2, the Bachelorettes alternated handing out roses, with each rose coming from both. From week 3 onwards, the contestants had to divide into two groups based on which Bachelorette they were pursuing. If a contestant rejected a rose from one of the Bachelorettes, he would return to the line and wait to see if he received a rose from the other Bachelorette. If he did not receive a rose from the second Bachelorette, he was eliminated.

Brett Young, Karamo Brown, and Matt White made guest appearances this season.

== Contestants ==
35 potential contestants were revealed on March 23, 2022.

The final cast of 32 men was announced on June 7, 2022. James Clarke was originally cast in season 16 featuring Clare Crawley, when filming of that season was due to start in March 2020. However, television productions were shut down due to the COVID-19 pandemic, and he was not called back for the rescheduled season in July 2020.

Name	Age	Hometown	Occupation	Bachelorette	Outcome	Place (Note: From week 4 onwards, the men were divided into two groups. Their placement reflects where they finished for their respective Bachelorette.)	Ref
Tino Franco	28	Valencia, California	General Contractor	Rachel	Winner	1	
Erich Schwer	29	Bedminster, New Jersey	Real Estate Analyst	Gabby	Winner	1	
Aven Jones	28	Beverly, Massachusetts	Sales Executive	Rachel	Runner-Up	2	
Zach Shallcross	25	Anaheim Hills, California	Tech Executive	Rachel	Week 8	3 (quit)	
Jason Alabaster	30	Memphis, Tennessee	Investment Banker	Gabby	Week 8	2 (quit)	
Johnny DePhillipo	25	Palm Beach Gardens, Florida	Realtor	Gabby	Week 8	3	
Tyler Norris	25	Rio Grande, New Jersey	Small Business Owner	Rachel	Week 7	4	
Spencer Swies	27	Bloomfield Hills, Michigan	Graduate Student	Gabby	Week 6	4	
Ethan Kang	27	Greenwood Village, Colorado	Advertising Executive	Rachel	Week 6	5	
Logan Palmer	26	Phoenix, Arizona	Videographer	Rachel (Week 4); Gabby (Week 5–6) (Note: Palmer initially accepted a rose from Recchia, but in week 5 expressed his interest in pursuing Windey instead.)	Week 6	5 (MD) (Note: Palmer was medically removed in week 6 after testing positive to COVID-19.)	
Nate Mitchell	33	Carrier Mills, Illinois	Electrical Engineer	Gabby	Week 6	6	
James Clarke	25	Winnetka, Illinois	Meatball Enthusiast	Rachel	Week 5	6	
Mario Vassall	31	Naperville, Illinois	Personal Trainer	Gabby	Week 5	7–8	
Michael Vaughan	32	Long Beach, California	Pharmaceutical Salesman	Gabby	Week 5	7–8	
Jordan Helman	35	Chambersburg, Pennsylvania	Software Developer	Rachel	Week 4	7	
Hayden Markowitz	29	Savannah, Georgia	Leisure Executive	Rachel	Week 4	8	
Kirk Bryant	29	Bullard, Texas	College Football Coach	Gabby	Week 4	9-10	
Quincey Williams	25	Miami, Florida	Life Coach	Gabby	Week 4	9-10	
Alec Garza	27	Houston, Texas	Wedding Photographer	N/A	Week 3	19–21	
Jacob Rapini	27	Sonora, California	Mortgage Broker	N/A	Week 3	19–21	
James Clarke	(Returned to competition)			N/A	Week 3	(Note: Clarke returned after being eliminated in week 3.)	
Termayne Harper	28	Naperville, Illinois	Crypto Guy	N/A	Week 3	19–21	
Brandan Hall	23	Carlsbad, California	Bartender	N/A	Week 2	22–27	
Colin Farrill	36	Acton, Massachusetts	Sales Director	N/A	Week 2	22–27	
John Anderson	26	Nashville, Tennessee	English Teacher	N/A	Week 2	22–27	
Justin Budfuloski	32	Solana Beach, California	Physical Therapist	N/A	Week 2	22–27	
Matt Labagh	25	Waterbury, Connecticut	Shipping Executive	N/A	Week 2	22–27	
Ryan Mula	36	Wayland, Massachusetts	Investment Director	N/A	Week 2	22–27	
Chris Austin	30	Redondo Beach, California	Mentality Coach	N/A	Week 2	28	
Jordan Vandergriff	27	Alpharetta, Georgia	Drag Racer	N/A	Week 2	29	
Joey Young	24	Brookfield, Connecticut	Twin	N/A	Week 1	30–32	
Justin Young	24	Brookfield, Connecticut	Other Twin	N/A	Week 1	30–32	
Robert "Roby" Sobieski	33	Hollywood Hills, California	Magician	N/A	Week 1	30–32	

=== Future appearances ===
==== The Bachelor ====
Zach Shallcross was chosen as the lead for season 27 of The Bachelor.

==== Bachelor in Paradise ====
Season 8

Hayden Markowitz, Jacob Rapini, Joey Young, Johnny DePhillipo, Justin Young, Logan Palmer, and Tyler Norris returned for season 8 of Bachelor in Paradise. Hayden and Jacob were eliminated in week 4. Logan split from Kate Gallivan in week 5. Joey and Justin split from Shanae Ankney and Florence Moerenhout, respectively, in week 6. Tyler left in a relationship with Brittany Galvin in week 6. Johnny got engaged to Victoria Fuller in week 6.

Season 9

Rachel Recchia, Tyler, Aven Jones, and Jordan Vandergriff returned for season 9 of Bachelor in Paradise. Tyler and Rachel quit in week 4. Jordan split from Mercedes Northup in week 5. Aven left in a relationship with Kylee Russell in week 5.

==== Dancing with the Stars ====
Gabby Windey participated in season 31 of Dancing with the Stars where she partnered with Val Chmerkovskiy. They finished runner-up to Charli D'Amelio.

==== The Traitors ====
Gabby Windey participated in season 3 of The Traitors, ultimately being one of the co-winners of the season.

==== Perfect Match ====
Rachel Recchia participated in season 3 of Perfect Match.

== Call-out order ==
Order	Bachelors	Individual phase			Group phase					Final
Order	Bachelors	Week								
Order	Bachelors	1 (Note: The Bachelorettes decided not to host a rose ceremony. Instead, they eliminated Joey, Justin Y., and Roby separately. The remaining men are listed in alphabetical order.)	2 (Note: The Bachelorettes gave out joint roses at the rose ceremony, meaning that the rose came from both women, regardless of who handed it out.)	3	4	5	6	7 (Note: Aven's hometown date aired during The Men Tell All special. Additionally, the rose ceremony was not aired as all the remaining men received roses. Instead, it was shown as a deleted scene on ABC's website.)	8 (Note: Gabby did not hold a rose ceremony as Erich was the last man standing.)	9
1	Zach	Tino	Logan	Zach	Tino	Tino	Zach	Aven (Note: The contestant received a rose from Rachel); Tino; Zach	Erich	Tino
2	Jason	Mario	Johnny	Erich	Jason	Nate	Tyler	Aven; Tino; Zach	Tino	Erich
3	Aven	Alec; Aven; Brandan; Chris; Colin; Erich; Ethan; Hayden; Jacob; James; Jason; John; Johnny; Jordan H. Jordan V. Justin B. Kirk; Logan; Matt; Michael; Nate; Quincey; Ryan; Spencer; Termayne; Tyler; Zach	Nate	Aven	Spencer	Aven	Erich (Note: The contestant received a rose from Gabby)	Aven; Tino; Zach	Aven	Aven
4	Jordan H.	Alec; Aven; Brandan; Chris; Colin; Erich; Ethan; Hayden; Jacob; James; Jason; John; Johnny; Jordan H. Jordan V. Justin B. Kirk; Logan; Matt; Michael; Nate; Quincey; Ryan; Spencer; Termayne; Tyler; Zach	Jason	Tino	Tyler	Johnny	Jason	Erich; Jason; Johnny	Zach	
5	Michael	Alec; Aven; Brandan; Chris; Colin; Erich; Ethan; Hayden; Jacob; James; Jason; John; Johnny; Jordan H. Jordan V. Justin B. Kirk; Logan; Matt; Michael; Nate; Quincey; Ryan; Spencer; Termayne; Tyler; Zach	Aven	Nate	Nate	Jason	Johnny	Erich; Jason; Johnny	Jason	
6	Chris	Alec; Aven; Brandan; Chris; Colin; Erich; Ethan; Hayden; Jacob; James; Jason; John; Johnny; Jordan H. Jordan V. Justin B. Kirk; Logan; Matt; Michael; Nate; Quincey; Ryan; Spencer; Termayne; Tyler; Zach	Erich	Logan	Aven	Zach	Aven	Erich; Jason; Johnny	Johnny	
7	Mario	Alec; Aven; Brandan; Chris; Colin; Erich; Ethan; Hayden; Jacob; James; Jason; John; Johnny; Jordan H. Jordan V. Justin B. Kirk; Logan; Matt; Michael; Nate; Quincey; Ryan; Spencer; Termayne; Tyler; Zach	Zach	Johnny	Erich	Spencer	Tino	Tyler		
8	Ethan	Alec; Aven; Brandan; Chris; Colin; Erich; Ethan; Hayden; Jacob; James; Jason; John; Johnny; Jordan H. Jordan V. Justin B. Kirk; Logan; Matt; Michael; Nate; Quincey; Ryan; Spencer; Termayne; Tyler; Zach	Jordan H.	Spencer	James	Tyler	Ethan; Spencer			
9	Kirk	Alec; Aven; Brandan; Chris; Colin; Erich; Ethan; Hayden; Jacob; James; Jason; John; Johnny; Jordan H. Jordan V. Justin B. Kirk; Logan; Matt; Michael; Nate; Quincey; Ryan; Spencer; Termayne; Tyler; Zach	Quincey	Jason	Johnny	Erich	Ethan; Spencer			
10	Logan	Alec; Aven; Brandan; Chris; Colin; Erich; Ethan; Hayden; Jacob; James; Jason; John; Johnny; Jordan H. Jordan V. Justin B. Kirk; Logan; Matt; Michael; Nate; Quincey; Ryan; Spencer; Termayne; Tyler; Zach	Michael	Tyler	Zach	Ethan	Logan			
11	Quincey	Alec; Aven; Brandan; Chris; Colin; Erich; Ethan; Hayden; Jacob; James; Jason; John; Johnny; Jordan H. Jordan V. Justin B. Kirk; Logan; Matt; Michael; Nate; Quincey; Ryan; Spencer; Termayne; Tyler; Zach	Tino	Mario	Michael	Logan	Nate			
12	Hayden	Alec; Aven; Brandan; Chris; Colin; Erich; Ethan; Hayden; Jacob; James; Jason; John; Johnny; Jordan H. Jordan V. Justin B. Kirk; Logan; Matt; Michael; Nate; Quincey; Ryan; Spencer; Termayne; Tyler; Zach	Jacob	Ethan	Ethan	James; Mario; Michael				
13	Ryan	Alec; Aven; Brandan; Chris; Colin; Erich; Ethan; Hayden; Jacob; James; Jason; John; Johnny; Jordan H. Jordan V. Justin B. Kirk; Logan; Matt; Michael; Nate; Quincey; Ryan; Spencer; Termayne; Tyler; Zach	Tyler	Kirk	Mario	James; Mario; Michael				
14	Johnny	Alec; Aven; Brandan; Chris; Colin; Erich; Ethan; Hayden; Jacob; James; Jason; John; Johnny; Jordan H. Jordan V. Justin B. Kirk; Logan; Matt; Michael; Nate; Quincey; Ryan; Spencer; Termayne; Tyler; Zach	Termayne	Jordan H.	Logan	James; Mario; Michael				
15	Alec	Alec; Aven; Brandan; Chris; Colin; Erich; Ethan; Hayden; Jacob; James; Jason; John; Johnny; Jordan H. Jordan V. Justin B. Kirk; Logan; Matt; Michael; Nate; Quincey; Ryan; Spencer; Termayne; Tyler; Zach	Hayden	Quincey	Jordan H. Kirk; Quincey					
16	James	Alec; Aven; Brandan; Chris; Colin; Erich; Ethan; Hayden; Jacob; James; Jason; John; Johnny; Jordan H. Jordan V. Justin B. Kirk; Logan; Matt; Michael; Nate; Quincey; Ryan; Spencer; Termayne; Tyler; Zach	James	Michael	Jordan H. Kirk; Quincey					
17	Justin B.	Alec; Aven; Brandan; Chris; Colin; Erich; Ethan; Hayden; Jacob; James; Jason; John; Johnny; Jordan H. Jordan V. Justin B. Kirk; Logan; Matt; Michael; Nate; Quincey; Ryan; Spencer; Termayne; Tyler; Zach	Kirk	Hayden	Jordan H. Kirk; Quincey					
18	Brandan	Alec; Aven; Brandan; Chris; Colin; Erich; Ethan; Hayden; Jacob; James; Jason; John; Johnny; Jordan H. Jordan V. Justin B. Kirk; Logan; Matt; Michael; Nate; Quincey; Ryan; Spencer; Termayne; Tyler; Zach	Spencer	Alec (Note: The contestant was offered a rose from Rachel, but rejected the rose); Jacob; James; Termayne	Hayden					
19	Roby	Alec; Aven; Brandan; Chris; Colin; Erich; Ethan; Hayden; Jacob; James; Jason; John; Johnny; Jordan H. Jordan V. Justin B. Kirk; Logan; Matt; Michael; Nate; Quincey; Ryan; Spencer; Termayne; Tyler; Zach	Alec	Alec; Jacob; James; Termayne						
20	John	Alec; Aven; Brandan; Chris; Colin; Erich; Ethan; Hayden; Jacob; James; Jason; John; Johnny; Jordan H. Jordan V. Justin B. Kirk; Logan; Matt; Michael; Nate; Quincey; Ryan; Spencer; Termayne; Tyler; Zach	Ethan	Alec; Jacob; James; Termayne						
21	Tino	Alec; Aven; Brandan; Chris; Colin; Erich; Ethan; Hayden; Jacob; James; Jason; John; Johnny; Jordan H. Jordan V. Justin B. Kirk; Logan; Matt; Michael; Nate; Quincey; Ryan; Spencer; Termayne; Tyler; Zach	Mario	Alec; Jacob; James; Termayne						
22	Jacob	Alec; Aven; Brandan; Chris; Colin; Erich; Ethan; Hayden; Jacob; James; Jason; John; Johnny; Jordan H. Jordan V. Justin B. Kirk; Logan; Matt; Michael; Nate; Quincey; Ryan; Spencer; Termayne; Tyler; Zach	Brandan; Colin; John; Justin B. Matt; Ryan							
23	Tyler	Alec; Aven; Brandan; Chris; Colin; Erich; Ethan; Hayden; Jacob; James; Jason; John; Johnny; Jordan H. Jordan V. Justin B. Kirk; Logan; Matt; Michael; Nate; Quincey; Ryan; Spencer; Termayne; Tyler; Zach	Brandan; Colin; John; Justin B. Matt; Ryan							
24	Colin	Alec; Aven; Brandan; Chris; Colin; Erich; Ethan; Hayden; Jacob; James; Jason; John; Johnny; Jordan H. Jordan V. Justin B. Kirk; Logan; Matt; Michael; Nate; Quincey; Ryan; Spencer; Termayne; Tyler; Zach	Brandan; Colin; John; Justin B. Matt; Ryan							
25	Joey; Justin Y.	Alec; Aven; Brandan; Chris; Colin; Erich; Ethan; Hayden; Jacob; James; Jason; John; Johnny; Jordan H. Jordan V. Justin B. Kirk; Logan; Matt; Michael; Nate; Quincey; Ryan; Spencer; Termayne; Tyler; Zach	Brandan; Colin; John; Justin B. Matt; Ryan							
26	Joey; Justin Y.	Alec; Aven; Brandan; Chris; Colin; Erich; Ethan; Hayden; Jacob; James; Jason; John; Johnny; Jordan H. Jordan V. Justin B. Kirk; Logan; Matt; Michael; Nate; Quincey; Ryan; Spencer; Termayne; Tyler; Zach	Brandan; Colin; John; Justin B. Matt; Ryan							
27	Termayne	Alec; Aven; Brandan; Chris; Colin; Erich; Ethan; Hayden; Jacob; James; Jason; John; Johnny; Jordan H. Jordan V. Justin B. Kirk; Logan; Matt; Michael; Nate; Quincey; Ryan; Spencer; Termayne; Tyler; Zach	Brandan; Colin; John; Justin B. Matt; Ryan							
28	Spencer	Alec; Aven; Brandan; Chris; Colin; Erich; Ethan; Hayden; Jacob; James; Jason; John; Johnny; Jordan H. Jordan V. Justin B. Kirk; Logan; Matt; Michael; Nate; Quincey; Ryan; Spencer; Termayne; Tyler; Zach	Chris							
29	Matt	Alec; Aven; Brandan; Chris; Colin; Erich; Ethan; Hayden; Jacob; James; Jason; John; Johnny; Jordan H. Jordan V. Justin B. Kirk; Logan; Matt; Michael; Nate; Quincey; Ryan; Spencer; Termayne; Tyler; Zach	Jordan V.							
30	Nate	Joey; Justin Y. Roby								
31	Jordan V.	Joey; Justin Y. Roby								
32	Erich	Joey; Justin Y. Roby								

The contestant received a first impression rose from Rachel
The contestant received a first impression rose from Gabby
The contestant received a rose from Rachel during a date
The contestant received a rose from Gabby during a date
The contestant was eliminated
The contestant was eliminated during a date
The contestant was eliminated outside the rose ceremony
The contestant was medically removed from the competition
The contestant moved on to the next week by default
The contestant quit the competition
The contestant was Rachel's winner
The contestant was Gabby's winner
Explanatory notes

== Controversy ==
Contestant Erich Schwer faced controversy in September 2022 after photos of him posing with friends wearing Make America Great Again hats and wearing blackface in his high school yearbook emerged, with fans expressing frustration at ABC for casting yet another contestant with a racially insensitive past. On September 8, 2022, Schwer issued an apology for his actions.

Schwer was embroiled in further controversy when his ex-girlfriend came forward with allegations that he told her he was only going on the show for his career. Texts shared by her showed Schwer asking her to continue dating him because the show "isn't real", and he also allegedly sent her a bouquet of roses with a note saying "I'll never stop thinking of you" in the days before he left for filming. On the show's live finale, Schwer stated that he "used the show as an excuse to not confront her about our relationship." Windey further stated that Schwer had told her about the texts before they made their way online and that she had been "expecting them."

== Episodes ==
No. overall	No. in season	Title	Original release date	Prod. code	U.S. viewers (millions)	Rating (18–49)
204	1	"Week 1: Season Premiere"	July 11, 2022	1901	2.98	0.7
On the After the Final Rose in Clayton Echard's season of The Bachelor, Gabby and Rachel are named as bachelorettes and are telling the news to their respective families. Gabby arrived in Los Angeles and drives to Zamperini Field where she picks up Rachel, who was flying alone from Orlando. They arrive at their house in Southern California where they would live and begin their journeys. Both women have arrived at the mansion as the men start stepping out of the limos. Some men have unique entrances, with Jordan H. presenting headphones to each woman, Mario shows his dance moves, Ethan presents apples to juggle and to impress them, Logan brings two baby chicks, a choir group from Los Angeles Children's Chorus sing "Clayton Sucks" when introduced to Alec, James holds a section of long bread with meatballs, Brandan performs his comedy routine, Tino arrives on a forklift, Jacob arrives shirtless riding on a horse, Spencer brings folding chairs as he knows their feet are hurting from standing up so long, and Erich begs both women to help him with his necktie. Once all thirty-two men are present in the living room with Gabby and Rachel, they open with a champagne toast. Roby opens with a magic show that impresses both Gabby and Rachel, Hayden has a letter brought from his hometown to present it to Rachel for her birthday, Jacob goes aside to talk with Gabby on his attributes he desires in a woman, Rachel gets time with Aven until Jordan V. interrupts the conversation showing a biplane to her, and Mario gets time with Gabby, and they share a kiss. Tino tells Rachel about his past, and they kiss. Rachel gives her first impression rose to Tino and Gabby gives her first impression rose to Mario. Before the rose ceremony starts, Gabby and Rachel pull Roby, Joey and Justin Y. aside and send them home. Gabby and Rachel return to the ceremony announcing it is cancelled until the following week. All the remaining men move forward and everyone shares a champagne toast.
205	2	"Week 2"	July 18, 2022	1902	3.01	0.7
Following the cancelled rose ceremony, the 29 men move into the Bachelor mansion. They take part in a pageant competition at the mansion with Jesse, Gabby and Rachel as the judges determine which men are going to spend more time with Gabby and Rachel. The men show off their talents, some including Aven's basketball skills and Jacob explaining how he can help them save on their mortgage. Aven, Logan, Brandan, Jason, Johnny and Colin are selected for the first group date. Rachel brings Jason for a chat as she sees Gabby kissing Johnny. Rachel kisses Logan and he receives the group date rose. Gabby gives her rose to Johnny. Jordan V. is picked for the first one-on-one date of the season by Rachel. He meets Rachel and they drive into an airport to do zero gravity inside an airplane. During dinner, Jordan tells Rachel that his parents divorced when he was in teens and that he feels like he raised his younger siblings. Rachel steps outside where she expresses that she feels her and Jordan have no real chemistry, and she sends him home. Ashley Cooke and Brett Young performed on stage as Rachel thinks about her feelings. Nate is called for the one-on-one date with Gabby. He goes to the Bachlorette house to meet Gabby and they head out on their date by helicopter. They fly around Los Angeles until they arrive in a parking lot where they sit in a hot tub. During dinner, Nate reveals that he is a single father to his six-year-old daughter, and Gabby praises Nate on his parenting. Nate receives the one-on-one date rose. At the cocktail party, Mario and Tyler speak with Rachel while Erich speaks with Gabby, with their conversation ending in a kiss. Chris begins speaking to the other men about Fantasy Suites, and Quincey and some of the other men tell Rachel about what Chris Said. Rachel tells Gabby, and the two women confront Chris and send him home. After Gabby and Rachel walk Chris out, he returns and attempts to talk with the other men. Gabby and Rachel come back to see Chris and tell him to leave again. The rose ceremony begins, and Brandan, Colin, John, Justin B., Matt and Ryan are sent home.
206	3	"Week 3"	July 25, 2022	1903	3.19	0.7
Zach is called for the one-on-one date with Rachel. They take part for a Pretty Woman-type media press conference with Karamo Brown from Queer Eye. Later that night, the two attend a red carpet event at the El Capitan Theatre as they take a private screening to watch a movie of their home videos and a performance from Matt White at the top of the stage. Zach receives the rose. Erich is called for the one-one-one date with Gabby and her grandfather John is brought in for the date. The trio explore around Santa Monica and participate in a sound bath before they arrive at a bowling alley. During dinner, Gabby opens up to Erich about how she is estranged from her mother and has not spoken to her in years, saying she often feels too damaged to be loved. Gabby leaves the table and takes a moment to herself. She returns and Erich tells her that he really likes her, and will always be open and honest. Gabby gives him the rose. The first full group date of the season where the rest of the men are taking part in a photo shoot with Franco Lacosta with different themes of photo setups. James acts as a baby when taking part on a photo shoot with Aven as the birth mother, Jacob performs as Adam, and Gabby acts as Eve. Tino and Nate take each give respective proposals to Rachel and Gabby. At the after party at SoFi Stadium, Aven teaches Rachel football while Gabby spends time with Tyler and Hayden. Rachel gives her rose to Aven, while Gabby does not give out a rose. The start of the cocktail party is approaching as Jesse informs the men that the party is cancelled and that they will head straight for the rose ceremony. Jesse tells them that each bachelorette will start their individual journeys for the rest of the competition, and that the men must pick now which woman they would like to pursue. Every man that Gabby calls accepts her rose, whereas Rachel is rejected by James, Alec, and Termayne. In the end, Alec, Jacob, James and Termayne are sent home. James meets up with Rachel after, saying he made a mistake and would like to accept her rose.
207	4	"Week 4: France"	August 1, 2022	1904	3.11	0.7
Following last week's rose ceremony drama, James joins with the men reveals to them that he has joined Rachel's side. Jesse appears and tells the men they will be traveling to Le Havre, France and will be staying on Virgin Voyages Valiant Lady cruise ship during their voyage across Europe. The men confront Hayden over what he said to Gabby the previous night, to which Hayden responds that he called her "rough around the edges," defending himself by saying "my dumb ass uses the same verbage [sic] that Gabby uses to describe herself and she f---ing didn't like that" and that "well bitch, maybe you shouldn't use that f---ing word to describe yourself then." Tino and Jason have their own one-on-one dates with Rachel and Gabby in Paris. They stop at a café on the Parisian streets and then begin on their separate dates. Jason and Gabby travel to a hat store to look for chapellerie berets in Montmartre district, while Tino and Rachel dine together with crepes and wine near the iconic Notre Dame. Tino and Rachel's night portion takes place at the American Cathedral in Paris, where Rachel gives him the rose during a concert performance from Jordy. During Jason and Gabby's night portion of the date, Jason reveals that he has struggled with his mental health and has attended therapy, but that he was very overwhelmed when first arriving for the show. Gabby tells her own story to Jason, telling him that she and her mom are estranged. Gabby gives Jason a rose at Trocadéro. Nate, Kirk, Quincey, Erich, Michael, Mario, Spencer, and Johnny take part for Gabby's group date to participate the local version of kickboxing called savate inside the ship. Rachel and her men are present as audience members. Husband and wife trainers Haifa and Kareem train them and fight on the tournament. Logan, who is on Rachel's side, starts expressing his feelings that he likes Gabby more than Rachel. Spencer wins the event and Gabby gives him the group date rose. Rachel expresses disappointment that none of her men talked to her during Gabby's date, and expresses her feelings to the men later that night. The eight men from Rachel's side to take part on her group date where they meet with Flora and Forrest, experts who are there to teach them how to flirt. Some men see this as an opportunity for a kiss, including Zach and Jordan, while Hayden says that doesn't want to be around them. Tyler reads a love letter to Rachel. At the night portion, Tyler tells Rachel about his past relationships. Rachel gives the rose to him. At the cocktail party, Logan does not spend time with Rachel, including during the dinner portion, of the group date. When Gabby and Rachel join the men for a toast, Hayden shows a scrapbook to Rachel about his pet dog, Rambo, who has a brain tumor. James warns Rachel about Hayden's vulgarity. Rachel confronts Hayden, and she sends him home. Hayden leaves the ship by saying "I want Rambo more" and "Rachel, I hope you find someone that is going to treat you the way Rambo treats me." Jesse cancels the party and Jordan, Kirk and Quincey are sent home during the rose ceremony. The ship then moves forward to Bruges, Belgium.
208	5	"Week 5: Belgium"	August 8, 2022	1905	3.33	0.8
As the ship docks in Bruges, Belgium, Logan expresses his feelings that he wants to switch to Gabby's team. Prior to the daytime portion of the group date, Logan tells Rachel that he is more interested in Gabby and that he will not be participating in the group date. Logan visits Gabby and tells her his feelings, and Gabby tells him she needs time to think about it. While Rachel's men wait for Rachel to arrive for the group date, Jesse arrives to tell them that Rachel has cancelled the daytime portion of the date and that they can return to the ship to begin preparing for the nighttime portion. During the date, Rachel tells the men the news about Logan while having conversations with the remaining men. Tino receives the group date rose. Gabby's group date takes them on a boat ride along the historic canals of Bruges as they eat famous Belgian waffles. They later visit a local park where they play soccer with local children and participate in a "Rock, Paper, Scissors" fish toss game. The night portion of the date begins where Gabby allows Logan to join her team. Nate receives the group date rose. Aven is chosen for Rachel's one-on-one date as they ride on a horse carriage along the streets of Bruges, seeing famous landmarks before stopping at a local chocolate store to taste famous Belgian chocolates. During dinner, Aven tells Rachel that his parents were never together and because of that, he wants to feel very secure in whatever relationship he is in. Aven gives Rachel a good luck charm bracelet and she gives him the rose. Johnny has the next one-on-one date with Gabby where travel onto a ranch, drink beer, and have a spa day. Gabby expresses that she always has fun with Johnny, but wants their relationship to go deeper. At dinner, Johnny tells Gabby that he has struggled with depression throughout his life and that he is "hard on himself." Gabby reveals that she has had her own mental health struggles, and gives him the rose. At the cocktail party, the men from both sides gather up to discuss Logan's switch to Gabby's side. Gabby gives Nate chocloate, saying she wants it to be a souvenir for his daughter. Jesse interrupts the men, tells them that the party will have to end early, and prepare for the rose ceremony. At the ceremony, James, Mario and Michael are sent home.
209	6	"Week 6: Amsterdam"	August 15, 2022	1906	3.29	0.8
The journey has moved on to Amsterdam, Netherlands. Gabby and Rachel explore the city to discuss their journeys together and Jesse talks with them about on their experiences on the show so far. Chosen for a one-on-one date, Nate meets up with Gabby in Amsterdam. The couple walk around the city before Gabby tells Nate that she is not ready for the responsibility that would come with being a step-mother to his daughter. Gabby sends Nate home, ending their date short. Zach was chosen as Rachel's final one-on-one date of the season. They proceed to a tulip farm near Amsterdam and Rachel picks up a tulip for Zach as they have an encounter with Dutch wooden clogs, Gouda cheese, and buy lemonade. They take a ride through the tulip field on a bicycle and relax in a hot tub. At dinner, Zach reveals to Rachel that he was an overweight child and very unhappy. In turn, Rachel tells Zach about her experience in therapy. Zach tells Rachel he is falling in love with her and receives the date rose. Gabby and her men set out for the group date. They meet with Sanne Croese, who portrayed Susie, a sex mistress who has experience as a sadomasochism coach. After the group date, the men begin preparing for the after date party at the ship when they notice Logan is missing. Jesse tells Gabby that Logan was unable to continue The Bachelorette after having tested positive for COVID-19. The party is then cancelled as a precaution and ends the date early. Rachel and her men prepare for the final group date of the season, as they arrive in Edam, the cheese capital of the world, where they get to taste Gouda cheese and dance with the locals. The men are surprised by a strong man competition done in the region called the Cheesy Feats of Strength. The men carry big rounds of gouda cheese balanced on two platforms suspended from a board across their backs. Tino and Ethan end up head-to-head in the final showdown when Tino emerges victorious and is named the winner. At the after party, Tyler uses his time to chat with Rachel about on his past relationships. Tyler thinks that Rachel is "the one" and Rachel gives him the group date rose. Tino becomes upset that he didn't receive the group date rose and excuses himself from the other men. Tino expresses his belief that not receiving the rose means that their relationship is a step back and that he feels Rachel is unsure of their relationship. He states that Aven or Zach should be going home next. At the rose ceremony, three of Gabby's men and two of Rachel's men received roses, while Ethan and Spencer are sent home.
210	7	"Week 7: Hometowns"	August 22, 2022	1907	3.31	0.8
Gabby and Rachel are set to leave the cruise ship and head home to the United States to begin their hometown dates. Gabby visits New Orleans, Louisiana to see Jason for their hometown date exploring the scenic French Quarter before venturing around Bourbon Street. Jason's father Michael comes in to see Gabby and Jason at a park, bringing flowers. Afterwards, Jason brings Gabby to meet the rest of his family, including his mother and sister. Jason's mother expresses her excitement at the possibility of an engagement. However, later, Jason tells his mother that he does not see himself getting engaged anytime soon. Rachel arrives in Anaheim, California to meet with Zach where they ride bikes before arriving at John Wayne Airport to watch planes from the airport's runway at the rooftop of the terminal. Zach brings Rachel to meet his family, including actor Patrick Warburton, and is ecstatic after getting approval from his family. Rachel, Zach and his family watch on their first one-on-one date in the backyard of their home. Zach tells Rachel that he is in love with her. The next stop is in Palm Beach, Florida where Gabby meets Johnny. They immediately go to Johnny's family home where his family express approval over his potential engagement. Johnny tells his father he is "not fully there yet", but that his emotions are "confusing in the best way possible." Rachel arrives at The Wildwoods in Wildwood, New Jersey to meet up with Tyler. They walk, play games, and ride a ferris wheel on the boardwalk, where they meet some of Tyler's friends and family. Rachel steps away and tells producers that her connection with Tyler is not where she wants it to be. Rachel returns to Tyler where he tells her that he is in love with her. Rachel, however, sends him home before she is able to meet his family. Tyler returns to the family home alone and gives his family the news. Gabby arrives in Bedminster, New Jersey and meets Erich. Erich brings Gabby to his home and meet his family, including his father, Allan, who is battling stage 4 cancer. The family bond over Gabby's occupation as an ICU nurse, and Erich reveals that his mother's commitment to his father while battling cancer has given him an image of what he wants in a relationship. Erich tells his mother that he is ready to be engaged to Gabby. Gabby and Erich later go to Gladstone Tavern in Peapack, where Erich tells Gabby he is falling in love with her; Gabby reciprocates these feelings. In the desert of Santa Clarita, California, Rachel meets up with Tino. Rachel meets with Tino's family where his parents express disapproval over the shows premise, the fact that an engagement could happen so soon, and that they do not know each other outside of the show. Rachel is disheartened after the visit and expresses this to Tino, and he in turn tells her that he is falling in love with her. Rachel shares that she feels the same way, although she is concerned about how the visit with his family went.
211	8	"The Men Tell All"	August 29, 2022	N/A	3.31	0.8
Rachel arrives in Salem, Massachusetts to see Aven. They visit Crow Haven Corner, where a clairvoyant performs a love spell on them. They then meet with Aven's parents, who haven't been in the same room together since Aven's college graduation six years ago. Rachel is nervous because neither of his parents liked his last two girlfriends, but she gains their approval. The night ends with Aven telling Rachel that he's falling in love with her. Jesse addresses to the viewers that he explained the rose ceremony was edited out from the broadcast due to lack of production timing, and instead can be found at the show's website. No men were eliminated in the rose ceremony. Fourteen of twenty-six eliminated contestants were present sitting on the stage as reforming old friendships and questions about some of the men. Jesse offers the audience and the men to have free champagne from Virgin Voyages with a year-long cruise into a full of studio audience. He gives Logan and Nate a hot seat onto a separate interviews and also interviews contestants of the upcoming season of Bachelor in Paradise, and a preview is shown afterwards. Gabby and Rachel appear on stage, where Logan apologizes for his behavior. Bloopers were shown afterwards, and Billy Eichner and Luke Macfarlane then later appeared in the stage to promote on their upcoming film Bros.
212	9	"Week 8: Fantasy Suites, Part 1"	September 5, 2022	1908	3.26	0.7
The overnight dates are taking place in Playa del Carmen, Mexico. Gabby and Rachel sit down to discuss their time together in their respective journeys. Gabby meets with Erich for her first date in Mexico. and jumping on a watering hole through a free fall across the Cenote. Gabby and Erich's date goes well, and they go into the Fantasy Suite together. Rachel's first date is with Aven, where they ride on a boat across the Caribbean Sea and have a glass of champagne. They meet again at dinner, and go into the Fantasy Suite together. Tino meets with Rachel for their date, where they go horseback riding and plunge down onto a river canyon. Rachel expresses her concerns over their his hometown date, but Tino assures her that his parents will come around and tells her that he loves her, which Rachel recriprocates. They go in into the Fantasy Suite together. Johnny meets with Gabby for their date, where they take a yacht in Cozumel and have a picnic on the beach. Johnny tells Gabby that he does like her, but that he cannot promise that he will be ready for an engagement at the season's end. Gabby sends Johnny home. Gabby receives an envelope outside of her hotel room, which she finds out is from Erich, asking her to meet him on the bridge. Erich expresses that he would be hurt if she were to sleep with any of the other men during their respective overnight dates. Gabby expresses that she feels upset and disrespected by this, and begins questioning her relationship with Erich.
213	10	"Week 8: Fantasy Suites, Part 2"	September 6, 2022	1909	3.24	0.7
Continuing from the previous episode where it left off, Gabby continues to reiterate her displeasure with her conversation with Erich. Jason and Gabby meet for their overnight date and they play tennis, which Jason played in college. They then go swimming as Erich watches them from his hotel balcony. During the dinner portion, Jason expresses that the whole experience has been "weird" for him and that he has doubts about their relationships. Gabby feels completely blindsided by this, but asks him to go to the Fantasy Suite so they can have time to talk together off-camera. Jason agrees. The next morning, it is revealed that Jason has decided to quit the show. Gabby goes to his hotel room to speak with him one last time before Jason leaves, making Erich the only man of Gabby's that is left. Zach meets with Rachel for the last overnight date. They spend the day together on a secluded resort, and Zach expresses that he believes Rachel is his future wife. They go into the Fantasy Suite together. The next morning, Zach expresses that the night went nothing like he expected, and that Rachel told him that she believes he is not ready for marriage due to his age. Zach speaks with Jesse regarding his confusion over the turn of events. The rose ceremony begins. Jesse informs Rachel that Gabby will not be joining her, and Rachel will be the only bachelorette left. Tino, Aven, and Zach arrive at the ceremony. Zach asks Rachel to speak before the ceremony begins. Gabby meets with Erich and tells him that he is the only man left.
214	11	"Week 9: Season Finale"	September 13, 2022	1910A	3.55	0.9
The episode continues where the previous episode left off, with Zach speaking with Rachel. Zach expresses that he felt blindsided by her questioning his readiness for an engagement and his age. Rachel responds that she found clarity during their Fantasy Suite and has concluded that something is missing. Zach tells her he needs to leave. Rachel returns to the rose ceremony and gives the two roses to her two remaining men, Tino and Aven. During the live show, Zach and Rachel reunite for the first time since their breakup. Zach apologizes for questioning her character and says that he has no regrets regarding his time on the show. Aven joins Rachel to meet her family and two of her friends. After Aven speaks with her two friends, they express their concern to Rachel that he might not be ready for an engagement. Rachel asks Aven about this, and he tells her that he has no doubts about them being together, but that he does not want to jump into an engagement immediately. Rachel expresses confusion, telling him that what he is saying now goes against what he had said previously. Erich meets with Gabby to speak with her family. Her family expresses approval and Gabby expresses her love for Erich to them. Tino gets together with Rachel to meet her family. He receives approval from her family, including Rachel's father, whom Tino stated he was most nervous to meet. Rachel goes to meet Aven and speak to him about what he is feeling. Aven expresses that he wants to make sure their relationship will work outside of the show before he feels ready for an engagement. He tells her that is sure and confident about their relationship but admits he might have gotten "caught up" in everything. Rachel feels misled and states that she wants and expects an engagement, and that she knows Aven will not give her that. Aven continues to plead, but Rachel sends him home. During the live show, Aven and Rachel meet. Aven tells her he is sorry for how things ended and says he could have been better about communicating. Rachel tells him that he was doing what was best for him and that she wishes him nothing but the best. Gabby meets with Erich, where he tells her that he wants to date her in the "real world" and that he cannot promise an engagement. Gabby is visibly upset by this, but tells him she does not want to force him into anything. The episode ends with Gabby crying and saying she "does not want to do this anymore."
215	12	"After the Final Rose"	September 20, 2022	1910B	3.57	0.9
The season finale continues where the previous episode left off with Gabby upset over Erich being unsure over an engagement. However, she quickly decides that Erich not proposing is not a dealbreaker. Rachel then goes to meet with Tino, where she tells him he is the only man left. Tino proposes to Rachel, she gives him the final rose, and they become engaged. During the live show, Rachel speaks with Jesse and tells him that her and Tino's relationship faced some difficulties after leaving the show, and that Tino ultimately confessed to her that he kissed another woman. The finale cuts back to already-shot footage showing Tino and Rachel speaking about the situation. Tino expresses that he was unsure about the state of their relationship due to Rachel telling him that she was giving him the ring back, which Rachel denies. The two have a bit of back-and-forth before Rachel tells Tino that the relationship is over and gives him the ring back. Back at the live show, Tino joins Rachel onstage. Tino apologizes for making it seem like he placed the blame on her, and Rachel continues to deny that she called off the engagement. Following their discussion, Aven comes onstage and asks Rachel if she would like to leave with him to "catch up." The two leave the stage. Gabby arrives to meet with Jesse during the live show before it cuts back to the final day of filming in Mexico. Gabby meets with Erich, where he tells her she is his soulmate and he proposes. Gabby gives him the final rose and they become engaged. Back on the live show, the couple make their first public appearance together as fiancés. Erich addresses previous text messages that he sent to an ex-girlfriend in which he told her he was going on the show purely for business reasons. Erich says that he did not expect to make it past night one, and that he unexpectedly fell in love with Gabby. The couple leave together. On the live show, Zach is announced as the next Bachelor. Zach meets some of the women who will be appearing on his season. Fans get to decide who receives his first impression rose, with Brianna receiving the honor.
