= The Bachelor (American TV series) season 27 =

The Bachelor
- Season 27
- Promotional poster
- Starring: Zach Shallcross
- Presented by: Jesse Palmer
- No. of contestants: 30
- Winner: Kaity Biggar
- Runner-up: Gabi Elnicki
- No. of episodes: 11

Release
- Original network: ABC
- Original release: January 23 – March 27, 2023

Additional information
- Filming dates: September 26 – November 21, 2022

Season chronology
- ← Previous; Season 26 Next → Season 28

The twenty-seventh season of The Bachelor premiered on January 23, 2023. This season features 26-year-old Zach Shallcross, an Oracle sales executive from Anaheim Hills, California.

Shallcross finished in third place while exclusively pursuing Rachel Recchia on the nineteenth season of The Bachelorette featuring Recchia and Gabby Windey.

The season concluded on March 27, 2023, with Shallcross choosing to propose to 27-year-old travel nurse Kaity Biggar. They married on May 23, 2025, and live in Austin, Texas. Shallcross is only the second Bachelor to marry the woman he chose at the final rose ceremony, after Sean Lowe.

== Production ==
=== Casting and contestants ===
On September 14, 2022, it was reported that Shallcross was the frontrunner for the role. He was officially announced on September 20, 2022, during the live The Bachelorette season 19 finale. Shallcross then met his first five contestants, Bailey, Brianna, Brooklyn, Cat, and Christina.

Notable contestants include Christina Mandrell, who is the niece of country music singer Barbara Mandrell; Miss South Carolina 2018 Davia Bunch; Miss Florida World 2019 Lekha Ravi; and Ariel Frenkel, who is the ex-girlfriend of actor Michael Vlamis.

=== Filming and development ===
The season was delayed by three weeks from its standard first week of January start, to avoid a potential clash with ABC's coverage of Monday Night Football.

Filming began on September 26, 2022, in Agoura Hills, California. On October 22, the show was seen filming in Tallinn, Estonia. This season also includes visits to The Bahamas; London, England; and Budapest, Hungary, with filming concluding in Krabi, Thailand in mid-November.

Rapper Latto, former contestants Courtney Robertson and Victoria Fuller, retired NFL players Shawne Merriman and Antonio Gates, and band UB40 made guest appearances this season.

While filming in London, Shallcross tested positive to COVID-19 and was forced to self-isolate in a hotel quarantine. All of the remaining dates got cancelled and both the cocktail party and rose ceremony shifted into a remote format with simulcast via Zoom. This had previously occurred on the eighth season of The Bachelor Australia. After arriving in Estonia, contestant Greer Blitzer also received a positive Covid test. Unlike The Bachelorette 19, where contestant Logan Palmer was eliminated after testing positive, Blitzer remained in isolation until she returned a negative result the following week.

== Contestants ==
32 potential contestants were revealed on September 23, 2022.

The final cast of 30 women was announced on January 4, 2023.

In the second week, season 23 contestant Tahzjuan Hawkins asked to join the cast, but Shallcross declined.

| Name | Age | Hometown | Occupation | Outcome | Place | Ref |
|---|---|---|---|---|---|---|
| Kaitlyn "Kaity" Biggar | 27 | Kingston, Ontario | Travel Nurse | Winner | 1 | |
| Gabriella "Gabi" Elnicki | 25 | Pittsford, Vermont | Senior Account Executive | Runner-Up | 2 | |
| Ariel Frenkel | 28 | Manhattan, New York | Marketing Executive | Week 9 | 3 | |
| Charity Lawson | 26 | Columbus, Georgia | Child and Family Therapist | Week 8 | 4 | |
| Katherine Izzo | 26 | Tampa, Florida | Registered Nurse | Week 7 | 5 | |
| Brooklyn Willie | 25 | Mineola, Texas | Rodeo Racer | Week 7 | 6 | |
| Greer Blitzer | 24 | Bellaire, Texas | Medical Sales Representative | Week 7 | 7 | |
| Alyssa "Aly" Jacobs | 26 | Smyrna, Georgia | Healthcare Strategist | Week 6 | 8 | |
| Jessica "Jess" Girod | 23 | Winter Springs, Florida | E-Commerce Coordinator | Week 6 | 9 | |
| Kylee Russell | 25 | Charlotte, North Carolina | Postpartum Nurse | Week 5 | 10-11 | |
| Mercedes Northup | 24 | Bloomfield, Iowa | Nonprofit Case Manager | Week 5 | 10-11 | |
| Davia Bunch | 25 | Roebuck, South Carolina | Marketing Manager | Week 4 | 12–13 | |
| Genevie Mayo | 26 | Joppa, Maryland | Neonatal Nurse | Week 4 | 12–13 | |
| Anastasia Keramidas | 30 | Baltimore, Maryland | Content Marketing Manager | Week 4 | 14 | |
| Christina Mandrell | 26 | Hendersonville, Tennessee | Content Creator | Week 3 | 15 | |
| Brianna Thorbourne | 24 | Jersey City, New Jersey | Entrepreneur | Week 3 | 16 (quit) | |
| Bailey Brown | 27 | Brentwood, Tennessee | Executive Recruiter | Week 3 | 17 | |
| Catherine "Cat" Wong | 26 | Bushwick, New York | Professional Dancer | Week 2 | 18–20 | |
| Kimberly Gutierrez | 30 | Stroudsburg, Pennsylvania | Hospitality Manager | Week 2 | 18–20 | |
| Victoria Jameson | 30 | Keller, Texas | Professional Makeup Artist | Week 2 | 18–20 | |
| Becca Serrano | 25 | Burbank, California | Nursing Student | Week 1 | 21–29 | |
| Cara Ammon | 27 | McCandless, Pennsylvania | Corporate Recruiter | Week 1 | 21–29 | |
| Holland Parsons | 24 | Boca Raton, Florida | Insurance Marketer | Week 1 | 21–29 | |
| Lekha Ravi | 29 | Miami, Florida | Financial Advisor | Week 1 | 21–29 | |
| Olivia Lewis | 24 | Churchville, New York | Patient Care Technician | Week 1 | 21–29 | |
| Olivia Miller | 25 | Delphos, Ohio | Stylist | Week 1 | 21–29 | |
| Sonia Sharma | 29 | Jericho, New York | Project Manager | Week 1 | 21–29 | |
| Vanessa Dinh | 23 | Farmington Hills, Michigan | Restaurant Marketer | Week 1 | 21–29 | |
| Viktoria Eichner | 29 | Vienna, Austria (Note: Eichner is originally from Vienna, Austria but was residing in Chicago, Illinois at the time of casting and filming.) | Nanny | Week 1 | 21–29 | |
| Madison Johnson | 26 | Fargo, North Dakota | Business Owner | Week 1 | 30 | |

=== Future appearances ===
==== The Bachelorette ====
Charity Lawson was chosen as the lead for season 20 of The Bachelorette.

==== Bachelor in Paradise ====
Season 9

Becca Serrano, Brooklyn Willie, Cat Wong, Davia Bunch, Genevie Mayo, Greer Blitzer, Jess Girod, Katherine Izzo (now going by Kat), Kylee Russell, Mercedes Northup, and Olivia Lewis returned for season 9 of Bachelor in Paradise. Greer, Brooklyn, and Cat were eliminated in week 1. Becca quit in week 3. Davia and Genevie were eliminated in week 3. Jess split from Tanner Courtad, Mercedes split from Jordan Vandergriff, and Olivia split from Michael Barbour in week 5. Kylee left in a relationship with Aven Jones in week 5. Katherine got engaged to John Henry Spurlock in week 5.

Season 10

Katherine returned for season 10 of Bachelor in Paradise. She was eliminated and left in a relationship with Dale Moss in the finale.

==== Dancing with the Stars ====
Charity participated in season 32 of Dancing with the Stars where she partnered with Artem Chigvintsev. They finished in fourth place.

== Call-out order ==
| Order | Bachelorettes | Week | | | | | | | | | |
| Order | Bachelorettes | 1 | 2 | 3 | 4 | 5 (Note: Shallcross tested positive to COVID-19 after his first date in London. As a result, the remainder of the dates were cancelled and the rose ceremony was conducted over Zoom.) | 6 | 7 | 8 | 9 | 10 |
|---|---|---|---|---|---|---|---|---|---|---|---|
| 1 | Jess | Brianna | Katherine | Kaity | Katherine | Gabi | Charity | Kaity | Ariel | Kaity | Kaity |
| 2 | Ariel | Greer | Christina | Charity | Ariel | Kaity | Ariel | Gabi | Kaity | Gabi | Gabi |
| 3 | Charity | Christina | Jess | Aly | Brooklyn | Charity | Greer (Note: Blitzer temporarily removed from the competition after being isolated due to a positive COVID-19 test.) | Ariel | Gabi | Ariel | |
| 4 | Davia | Charity | Brooklyn | Jess | Charity | Aly | Gabi | Charity | Charity | | |
| 5 | Gabi | Bailey | Genevie | Gabi | Kaity | Katherine | Kaity | Katherine | | | |
| 6 | Greer | Jess | Greer | Ariel | Gabi | Brooklyn | Brooklyn | Brooklyn | | | |
| 7 | Viktoria E. | Genevie | Aly | Genevie | Jess | Jess | Katherine | Greer | | | |
| 8 | Madison | Davia | Charity | Greer | Mercedes | Ariel | Aly | | | | |
| 9 | Aly | Aly | Kaity | Katherine | Aly | Greer | Jess | | | | |
| 10 | Anastasia | Brooklyn | Gabi | Kylee | Greer | Kylee; Mercedes | | | | | |
| 11 | Cat | Kaity | Ariel | Davia | Kylee | Kylee; Mercedes | | | | | |
| 12 | Brooklyn | Anastasia | Anastasia | Anastasia | Davia; Genevie | | | | | | |
| 13 | Bailey | Kylee | Kylee | Brooklyn | Davia; Genevie | | | | | | |
| 14 | Kaity | Gabi | Davia | Mercedes | Anastasia | | | | | | |
| 15 | Genevie | Katherine | Mercedes | Christina | | | | | | | |
| 16 | Katherine | Mercedes | Bailey | Brianna | | | | | | | |
| 17 | Vanessa | Ariel | Brianna | Bailey | | | | | | | |
| 18 | Kimberly | Victoria J. | Cat; Kimberly; Victoria J. | | | | | | | | |
| 19 | Olivia M. | Kimberly | Cat; Kimberly; Victoria J. | | | | | | | | |
| 20 | Victoria J. | Cat | Cat; Kimberly; Victoria J. | | | | | | | | |
| 21 | Kylee | Becca; Cara; Holland; Lekha; Olivia L. Olivia M. Sonia; Vanessa; Viktoria E. | | | | | | | | | |
| 22 | Lekha | Becca; Cara; Holland; Lekha; Olivia L. Olivia M. Sonia; Vanessa; Viktoria E. | | | | | | | | | |
| 23 | Holland | Becca; Cara; Holland; Lekha; Olivia L. Olivia M. Sonia; Vanessa; Viktoria E. | | | | | | | | | |
| 24 | Mercedes | Becca; Cara; Holland; Lekha; Olivia L. Olivia M. Sonia; Vanessa; Viktoria E. | | | | | | | | | |
| 25 | Christina | Becca; Cara; Holland; Lekha; Olivia L. Olivia M. Sonia; Vanessa; Viktoria E. | | | | | | | | | |
| 26 | Sonia | Becca; Cara; Holland; Lekha; Olivia L. Olivia M. Sonia; Vanessa; Viktoria E. | | | | | | | | | |
| 27 | Becca | Becca; Cara; Holland; Lekha; Olivia L. Olivia M. Sonia; Vanessa; Viktoria E. | | | | | | | | | |
| 28 | Cara | Becca; Cara; Holland; Lekha; Olivia L. Olivia M. Sonia; Vanessa; Viktoria E. | | | | | | | | | |
| 29 | Olivia L. | Becca; Cara; Holland; Lekha; Olivia L. Olivia M. Sonia; Vanessa; Viktoria E. | | | | | | | | | |
| 30 | Brianna | Madison | | | | | | | | | |

The contestant received America's first impression rose
The contestant received Zach's first impression rose
The contestant received a rose during a date
The contestant received a rose during a date
The contestant was eliminated
The contestant was eliminated outside the rose ceremony
The contestant was eliminated during a date
The contestant was temporarily removed from the competition
The contestant quit the competition
The contestant won the competition

== Controversy ==
Contestant Greer Blitzer faced controversy shortly after the season premiere after tweets of her defending blackface were uncovered, continuing the trend of contestants with racist social media histories being cast in the franchise. On January 24, 2023, Blitzer issued an apology for her past behavior.

The incident was further addressed during the Women Tell All special on March 14, 2023, with host Jesse Palmer acknowledging the franchise's failings to adequately address serious topics such as racism in the past. Blitzer also confirmed that she was educating herself on the history of blackface and had met with Dr. Kira Banks, a psychologist and diversity consultant.

== Episodes ==
| No. overall | No. in season | Title | Original release date | Prod. code | U.S. viewers (millions) | Rating (18–49) |
|---|---|---|---|---|---|---|
| 276 | 1 | "Week 1: Season Premiere" | January 23, 2023 | 2701 | 2.96 | 0.7 |
Zach begins his journey in his hometown of Southern California. He meets season 17 bachelor Sean Lowe who gives him advice on finding a perfect soul mate. During the Night One Limo Entrances, Davia presents a bottle of champagne and makes a toast with Zach. Gabi brings maple syrup from her home state of Vermont. Greer holds a New York style coffee date. Cat shows her "cat" moves. Bailey comes in with a nametag to ensure that Zach remembers her name. Other entrances include Lekha licking Zach's neck, Mercedes coming in with a pig, and Christina bringing a party bus. Once all 30 ladies are inside, Zach makes a toast and the party begins. Kaity makes a first impression with Zach, which ends in them kissing. Christina takes the party into her party bus. Ultimately, Greer receives the first impression rose. Madison is sent home before the rose ceremony due to embarrassing behavior and at the rose ceremony, Becca, Cara, Holland, Lekha, Olivia L., Olivia M., Sonia, Vanessa and Viktoria E. are sent home.
| 277 | 2 | "Week 2" | January 30, 2023 | 2702 | 2.98 | 0.6 |
The first group date of the season includes Brianna, Brooklyn, Katherine, Mercedes, Bailey, Davia, Kat, Genevie, and Kylee for a “Bachelor Big Energy” event. Zach joins with Latto and former contestants Courtney Robertson (season 16), Tahzjuan Hawkins (season 23) and Victoria Fuller (season 24). Each woman has to give best “bitch energy” look and ended up with no winner. At the night portion, Tahzjuan reappears interrupted Zach’s one-on-one with Cat as she persuades to join the party but Zach declined, Brianna went a lot hard to increase her feelings with no reason to reward a date rose. Katherine receives the group date rose. Christina got the season’s first one-on-one date, she and Zach took a helicopter ride to his hometown of Anaheim Hills meeting his family and several of his relatives, which hosting a family barbecue for his mom’s birthday. The night portion at Orange County Mining Club, Christina reveals to Zach that she is a mom to her 5-year-old daughter and Zach gave her a rose. Victoria J., Gabi, Kaity, Ariel, Anastasia, Kimberly, Aly, Charity, Jess and Greer are chosen for the second group date and decided to take the after party instead. (Note: The second group date had involved a puppet show hosted by Shallcross's uncle and actor Patrick Warburton occurred on a daytime, which was unaired.) Ariel has true feelings that she has yet to talk with Zach, while Gabi has hard time that she hasn’t spoken to Zach since her night one arrival and finally has her chance to talk to him. Zach then tells his story to Jess that he had suffered pyloric stenosis as an infant, and she ends up receiving the group date rose. The cocktail party has both Christina and Brianna recalled their time in night one, Brianna becomes frustrated that she did not receive a rose earlier in the date and Zach talks to her. At the rose ceremony, Cat, Kimberly and Victoria J. are sent home.
| 278 | 3 | "Week 3" | February 6, 2023 | 2703 | 2.92 | 0.6 |
Kaity has the one-on-one date taking place at the Natural History Museum to spend the night with Zach, Kaity opens her story to Zach about her past relationships and she receives the rose. Gabi, Bailey, Anastasia, Katherine, Brianna, Christina, Brooklyn, Davia, Greer, Charity, Ariel, Jess, Mercedes, Genevie and Kylee are chosen for the group date as they arrive at the grounds of Moorpark College to participate in the Bachelor Bowl event. Zach brings former football players Shawne Merriman and Antonio Gates that divide into teams of 8-7: the Ball-Zachers and the Shall-Crushers. Jesse and Hannah Storm provide the commentary. Anastasia suffered minor injury and is doing fine. The Ball-Zachers defeated the Shall-Crushers 14-7 and invited at the after party at Clifton's Cafeteria. Bailey comes in to talk with Zach that she had not spent a lot of time during her limo exit, as she turns emotional and Zach sends her home. Brooklyn and the other ladies confront together about Christina that her behavior wouldn’t be acceptable for right reasons. Zach presents the rose to Charity. Aly has the second one-on-one date; she and Zach are faced with skydiving overlooking the Californian skyline and landed at Santa Rita Hills Winery and they sit on a hot tub. At the night portion at the Bradbury Building, Aly shows her expression that she has feelings with Zach and receiving the date rose with a performance of Griffin Palmer at the corner of the building. The cocktail party is replaced with the pool party, Ariel gets her time with Zach at the hot tub and he asks her to rub his feet, Brooklyn tells her matters about Brianna and Christina, and Zach walks in to talk to Brianna and warns on Christina, soon Brianna leaves on her own. Zach then goes to call Christina over on how she felt miserable and deceived because of her erratic feelings, Christina could not give up and is later sent home during the rose ceremony.
| 279 | 4 | "Week 4: The Bahamas" | February 13, 2023 | 2704 | 2.94 | 0.6 |
Jesse meets with the women and they would be going to The Bahamas. Katherine is called for the one-on-one date and set to sail at the top of the catamaran to begin a plunge down below to the sea across the ocean floor looking for sculptures. At the night portion, Katherine opens to Zach on her traumatic past dealing with her issues, Zach then gives her a rose and they watch the fireworks show. Ariel, Kaity, Greer, Davia, Aly, Mercedes, Kylee, Anastasia, Jess, Charity, Genevie and Gabi are chosen for the group date and they travel on the outskirts of Nassau to participate the Fish Fry Event as they compete in limbo games. Some ladies confront Anastasia’s Instagram having more followers, then she goes over to Kylee, this causing to tension to the other women. At the night portion, Anastasia and Kylee continue to bicker as they could not resist Anastasia's personal information, especially telling to the others. Zach then goes a one-on-one time with Charity, Kaity and Ariel, Zach goes to see Anastasia and he talks to her about the she has happened earlier in the day, she could not get resist and did not take her formal apology. Ariel receives the group date rose. Brooklyn has the second one-on-one date for the week, she and Zach take an ATV ride on the bungalow, having a picnic and take a swim on a shore. At the night portion, Brooklyn opens to Zach about her troubled past like she had a domestic violence when had a little contact with her family. Zach gives her a concentration and passes her a rose. The cocktail party has Zach to bring Anastasia over and she tells to Zach with no actions that she did during the group date, especially Kylee and Zach then sends her home. Davia becomes very worried when she hasn’t had her one-on-one with Zach and they begin talking around at each other. At the start of the rose ceremony, Kylee is unaware that she is wanted to go home but spared, sending Davia and Genevie home. Zach tells the remaining women would be heading to London, England.
| 280 | 5 | "Week 5: London" | February 20, 2023 | 2705 | 2.79 | 0.5 |
Gabi is chosen for the one-on-one date, the butler calls her to meet Zach, who awaits on a Rolls-Royce Phantom. They went to Floris to smell a perfume test and headed to a fashion store where they met with Royal Butler Grant Harrold and stylist Rachel Fanconi. They grab famous British styling hat and a crown for Gabi, they also brought Queen Elizabeth II's corgis, even they got a tea drink. The women staying at the hotel and surprise Gabi's return, she receives a perfume “Zabi”, tensions rise as Ariel expresses Gabi’s time with Zach. Gabi receives the dress for the second part of the date, she opens her story to Zach about her previous relationship and soon they have started good feelings together, Zach receives her a rose, and an appearance of UB40 singing “Can’t Help Falling in Love”. Brooklyn, Katherine, Aly, Jess, Kylee, Mercedes, Kaity, Greer and Ariel are chosen for the group date. Mercedes starts her bizarre meltdown, and Greer hasn’t yet to have a date and both ladies started crying, Charity comforts Mercedes to relive her emotions and then goes to Greer resolving her issues. The next day, the card has received that Zach is sick and could not be there as the date goes on, the ladies take a double-decker bus ride to give a tour of historic London as rain has started, they are exploring British culture and entertain with friendly locals. At the night portion of the date, a butler receives another card, Zach is still not okay and won’t be able for the party, a rose is placed on the table and cancelling the rest of the date, Kaity grabs the rose and began breaking into pieces. Jesse goes to inform the ladies that Zach has tested positive from COVID-19 but he’s now in isolation, cancelling Charity’s one-on-one date. Kaity carries the items putting aside Zach’s hotel door upon walking while talked to him, she whispers on hearing his voice from his room to rely on their strong bond that Zach is deeply in love with her. The next day, Jesse has become confused when he tells the women to have the first virtual cocktail party, Zach is seen live at his room while he’s still in isolation, the ladies will go on a separate room to communicate Zach via video chat from an iPad. Charity, Brooklyn, Aly, Katherine and Greer have spent time virtually. Greer then tells Zach that she got COVID herself upon she was working, knowing she has become upset and is desperate to leave. At the remote rose ceremony, Kylee and Mercedes are sent home.
| 281 | 6 | "Week 6: Estonia" | February 27, 2023 | 2706 | 2.98 | 0.6 |
The show moves on to Tallinn, Estonia, Zach and Jesse talk around his time together, Jesse tells a news to Zach that Greer has tested positive from COVID-19 and will sit out for the week. Charity goes for the first one-on-one, but Katherine steals to make time with Zach and have a chat. The duo later traveled around Tallinn Old Town onto a horse carriage ride as they encountered a wife-carrying competition, buying sweet almond treat and a toast of local drink. At the night portion, Charity opens her story to Zach about her relationship with her mom is very close as regrets over Zach’s feelings, he receives her a rose. Brooklyn, Aly, Gabi, Katherine, Kaity and Jess are chosen for the group date as they traveled to the Estonian Open Air Museum to meet Heli, a witch specializes onto a witchery and ritual procession. Jess begins frustrated when she hasn’t yet to have a one-on-one date where she’s very upset and worried if she would have spent time with Zach. At the night portion in Saku Manor, Katherine and Brooklyn started to confront around regarding about Jess, when Zach goes his one-on-one time with her having no choice for right reasons, Zach sends her home, and no rose has been given. Ariel is selected for the one-on-one date at Pätsuloigu Smoke Sauna, she and Zach receive a cured ham and smoked meat, they later changed into swimming outfits and bathrobes to begin for a sauna, the naked Estonian couple join them to share and spend time together even are on the hot tub. At the night portion, Ariel discusses Zach about on her past relationships that is a lot harder, Zach presents her a rose. The first cocktail party since The Bahamas two weeks earlier, Zach begins a toast with the remaining ladies, Katherine and Brooklyn discuss their time together as Katherine isn’t ready for her will, leaving only Brooklyn not getting controlled her shade. At the rose ceremony, Aly is the only contestant sent home.
| 282 | 7 | "Week 7: Budapest" | March 6, 2023 | 2707 | 3.06 | 0.6 |
The show moves on to Budapest, Hungary. Jesse receives the news to the women that Greer would reenter the competition despite she is still isolating in Estonia. Kaity has her second one-on-one date, where she and Zach explore the city riding on a Castle Hill Funicular, they give a treat of local delicacies such as Hungarian spices, overlooking Danube, gave a toast of pálinka and discovered a typewriter, they write their poems about first meeting together until they get kissed at Fisherman's Bastion. The night portion at Király Baths, Kaity opens her story to Zach that she lost both her father and her stepfather at a young age, Zach receives her a rose and take a relaxing romantic thermal bath for themselves. Greer is getting out of isolation and she is heading to Hungary. Ariel, Gabi, Charity and Katherine are chosen for the final group date of the season, they proceed at Kálmán Imre Theater to meet with Zach and magician Labib Malik to give mental skills for the women. Gabi goes first to chat with Zach and got insincere words, Katherine stirs her emotions as she feels a little devastated that hasn’t got another one-on-one. At the night portion, Gabi gives a one-on-one time with Zach on how she develops her huge feelings stating with a bright chemistry, Katherine then goes for a chat as she is felt hard and started to get worse, Zach did get nothing with her. Gabi receives the group date rose. Greer unexpectedly arrives in Budapest as she hasn’t seen Zach in The Bahamas and comes at his hotel room to talk, telling she got negative and came a good result, Zach sends her home. Brooklyn has the final one-on-one date for the season, she and Zach take a bike ride along the City Park where they give a free hot air balloon ride and reached at the Széchenyi thermal bath to get a spa with the locals. At the night portion of the date, Brooklyn is unsuitable that she would potentially bring Zach to her family especially she is close to her mom and her grandmother. Zach got concerned on his connection to Brooklyn and he sends her home. At the rose ceremony, Katherine is sent home that she feels on her shocking moment when she had a deep connection while in the Bahamas, this leaves her heartbroken and crying. Jesse gives Zach a hug.
| 283 | 8 | "Week 8: Hometowns" | March 13, 2023 | 2708 | 3.07 | 0.5 |
Gabi’s Hometown (Pittsford, Vermont): Zach meets her at the forest on the Vermont countryside to have drilled a hole on a maple tree and then challenged with a maple syrup test with one of the three would be a fake. Zach then met Gabi’s family as her sister, Chloe, who had become engaged, Zach goes to have one-on-one time with Gabi’s brother and learn that her brother is a lot supportive on her, then he goes to Gabi’s father about treating on her potential future that Gabi could get engaged soon.; Ariel’s Hometown (New York, New York): Zach meets her at Washington Square Park to explore the city’s scenery like bands performing at the park, they explore Ben’s Pizzeria to grab a slice of pizza, then went to Sarge’s for a Jewish food that Zach gets his first taste since Ariel is a Jew, her parents fled from Soviet Ukraine due to persecution. Zach meets her family that how Ariel is a lot supportive as the family is super strict, Ariel’s older brother Bobby gets his time with Zach to know about facts about Ariel where he oversaw on her previous relationships, when Ariel’s dad gets commitment about her that she could be the right one.; Charity’s Hometown (Columbus, Georgia): Zach meets her on the riverside as Charity introduces Zach to her family and her childhood friends for a Southern barbecue lunch. Charity’s brother Nehemiah tells Zach knowing on Charity had previously brought someone from home before, the brother wasn’t less impressed. Charity’s father David gets her time with Zach that if Charity would get possibly engaged at the end of this, she could be a lot happy. Charity and Zach then went to a bar in Downtown Columbus for a line dancing.; Kaity’s Hometown (Austin, Texas): Zach meets her in Downtown Austin, they went to South Congress district to shop for groceries and even visiting her house to let Zach setting up some necessities like building bookshelf and installing light bulbs. Kaity, who grew up in Kingston, Ontario, tells Zach that she moved to the city for work a few weeks before the show. Her family then soon appears, Zach is getting emotional when he met Kaity’s mother, Kaity herself being told by her mom that she had a serious past relationship lasted for seven years and that did barely work well on and off. Kaity gives Zach a farewell hug willing on a strong romantic connection.; In Los Angeles, Zach is greeted by Sean and discuss how the Final 4 that he experienced in each visit, knowing that Zach would have a difficult decision that he would ever get. At the rose ceremony, Charity is sent home and she goes to chat with Zach as she’s started getting heartbroken and hurting her feelings, she feels a little emphatic.
| 284 | 9 | "The Women Tell All" | March 14, 2023 | N/A | 2.48 | 0.4 |
Fifteen of the twenty-seven eliminated contestants are on stage as old rivalries reformed and friendships reinstated especially Anastasia and Kylee, as Cat told Anastasia that she didn’t really have a boyfriend during filming. Anastasia then gives Kylee an apology. Jesse gives Greer, Katherine, and Charity for a hot seat, Greer discusses her opinion about her racism issues when she addresses her blackface past, as she has given evaluated by Dr. Kira Banks, a psychologist and diversity consultant, on her bizarre behavior. Bloopers are shown afterwards plus including several deleted scenes. Zach then appears on stage; Katherine gives him an apology whenever she struggled during the onset on competition that she wanted to have a proposed hometown date. As the show comes to wrap up, Jesse then goes to a makeup room and he surprises Charity as the next Bachelorette.
| 285 | 10 | "Week 9: Fantasy Suites" | March 20, 2023 | 2709 | 3.26 | 0.6 |
The show moves on to Krabi, Thailand, Zach is met by Jesse and explained the “no sex” week would be about, he received an advice from Sean if he could succeed compared to previous leads. Zach starts his date with Ariel riding on a tuktuk to proceed to the night market in Mueang Krabi district to eat a treat of local delicacies like crickets and scorpions, and they get kissed on the open restaurant. Ariel opens up her feelings that Zach is definitely falling his heart out to her. Gabi goes for her next date, where she sees Zach and they take a free junk for themselves to plunge down the Andaman Sea and swim across the private island on the shore. They give a traditional toast as Gabi started to freak out knowing on her previous relationships, she then goes back to Zach and could not be able to give trust. Before Zach’s date with Kaity, he is surprised by Jesse to give a chat what happened on his overnight with Gabi, then Zach goes to see Gabi in her hotel room what did happen on the overnight date, she felt totally blindsided and did not spare her time with Zach, Zach himself that he would have his future on Gabi, the fate must be decided. Kaity goes for her date with Zach taking a canoe ride on a mangrove forest in Ao Luek district and rain got started, they sit on a canopy of mangrove leaves as Kaity starts her expression as she’s started a lot harder when she became homesick and separated from her family, Kaity tries to emphasize her stirred emotions even she talks with the producer on being the difficult choice would ever get. All three ladies received fantasy suite invitations, as in cases with Gabi and Kaity, they recovered while accepted the overnight invitations. At the rose ceremony, Kaity and Gabi receive roses and Ariel is sent home, she quickly began worrying her time at the show.
| 286 | 11 | "Week 10: Season Finale & After the Final Rose" | March 27, 2023 | 2710 | 3.40 | 0.6 |
Before the start of the live show, host Jesse Palmer opens for out of respect to the victims of Covenant School shooting happened earlier in the day. Recently eliminated Ariel goes in for a hot seat and tells how she implied having broken the no sex rule happened in the fantasy suites, Zach appears on stage and he sees Ariel since he had eliminated her in Thailand, Ariel stated that she gave up her job and she apologizes Zach upon wishing her to be the best. Gabi and Kaity have an opportunity to meet Zach’s family (his parents Chapman and Megan, and his sisters Samantha and Payton) in Thailand, as Gabi prepares to meet the family, she becomes very nervous that reciprocating her feelings like in the past weeks, Gabi finally goes on as she introduces the family and is being heart blessed. Zach’s dad Chapman tells Gabi that Zach was a very sick on his first few years of his life that he had his ordeal to survive but his father felt hard on his health condition. Kaity then goes to meet the family, Zach’s mom Megan reassures Kaity upon giving a hug, and telling to Kaity how his mom loved Zach as a caring mother, she then goes to Zach's dad Chapman how she had a difficult past on her earlier years of her life as Zach would be a good husband figure for her. Over at the last chance dates, Kaity goes on a lush national park somewhere in Krabi as she sees Zach standing on the dense rain forest and they get hiking and give swimming at the nearby waterfalls. Kaity thinks she could make her difficult decision would ever get. Gabi takes on a horseback riding on an open field at the jungle until she and Zach reached at the beach as they get surfing and frolicking on a shore. Gabi thinks her time with Zach made a difficult effort to be her husband if they would get proposed. Zach insists that he loves both women. Jesse brings sets of Neil Lane rings for Zach while helping him to pick a perfect ring for the upcoming proposal. Gabi is the first lady to see Zach how she is ready but Zach gives her a painful goodbye and made her elimination meltdown. At the live show, Gabi is being spoken by Jesse expressing on her actions that she is humiliated and blindsided. Zach then reappears at the stage to see Gabi since breaking up, she addresses to Zach about the time together during the show, stating that Gabi would have another love story of her own. Kaity arrives at the proposal location, Zach is going to be ready how he has a very strong connection and true feelings for her, Zach then proposes to her and gave her a final rose, they have become engaged. They made on their first public appearance on stage, Zach and Kaity discuss on their plans as they will be living together in Austin later in the summer and expecting to set a wedding in a couple of years’ time, the couple soon leave together.
