= The Bachelorette (American TV series) season 20 =

The Bachelorette
- Season 20
- Promotional poster
- Starring: Charity Lawson
- Presented by: Jesse Palmer
- No. of contestants: 25
- Winner: Dotun Olubeko
- Runner-up: Joey Graziadei
- No. of episodes: 9

Release
- Original network: ABC
- Original release: June 26 – August 21, 2023

Additional information
- Filming dates: March 20 – April 30, 2023

Season chronology
- ← Previous; Season 19 Next → Season 21

The twentieth season of The Bachelorette premiered on June 26, 2023. This season features 27-year-old Charity Lawson, a child and family therapist from Columbus, Georgia.

Lawson finished in fourth place on the 27th season of The Bachelor featuring Zach Shallcross.

The season concluded on August 21, 2023, with Lawson accepting a proposal from 30-year-old integrative medicine specialist Dotun Olubeko.

== Production ==
=== Casting and contestants ===
On March 14, 2023, Lawson was announced as the Bachelorette by Jesse Palmer during the Women Tell All special of the 27th season of The Bachelor.

Notable contestants include WWE NXT wrestler Caleb Balgaard, Guinness World Record holder Chris Spell, and Sean McLaughlin, son of politician Steven McLaughlin.

=== Filming and development ===
Filming began on March 20, 2023, in Agoura Hills, California. On April 8, Lawson was seen filming in New Orleans, Louisiana, and the season concluded in Fiji later that month.

Lauren Alaina, previous Bachelorettes Rachel Recchia and Gabby Windey, and season 12 couple JoJo Fletcher and Jordan Rodgers made guest appearances this season.

== Contestants ==
29 potential contestants were revealed on March 18, 2023.

The final cast of 25 men was announced on June 1, 2023.

Name	Age	Hometown	Occupation	Outcome	Place	Ref
Dotun Olubeko	30	Fresno, California	Integrative Medicine Specialist	Winner	1	
Joey Graziadei	27	Royersford, Pennsylvania	Tennis Pro	Runner-Up	2	
Aaron Bryant	29	Katy, Texas	Software Salesman	Week 7	3	
Xavier Bonner	27	Euclid, Ohio	Biomedical Scientist	Week 7	4	
Aaron Bryant	(Returned to competition)			Week 6	(Note: Bryant was originally eliminated in week 6, but he returned to the competition during week 7.)	
Tanner Courtad	30	Pittsburgh, Pennsylvania	Mortgage Lender	Week 5	5	
Sean McLaughlin	25	Troy, New York	Software Sales Rep	Week 5	6	
Caleb Balgaard	24	Fenton, Michigan	Pro Wrestler	Week 4	7-9	
John Buresh	27	Excelsior, Minnesota	Data Scientist	Week 4	7-9	
Michael Barbour	29	South Holland, Illinois	Yacht Captain	Week 4	7-9	
Brayden Bowers	24	Murrieta, California	Travel Nurse	Week 4	10 (quit)	
Aaron Schwartzman	33	Fremont, California	Firefighter	Week 3	11-13	
Adrian Hassan	33	North Hills, California	Realtor	Week 3	11-13	
James Pierce	28	Brownsburg, Indiana	Attorney	Week 3	11-13	
Warwick Reider	27	Oxford, Ohio	Construction Manager	Week 3	14	
Caleb Arthur	29	Kentwood, Michigan	Resident Physician	Week 2	15-19	
John Henry Spurlock	30	Wilmington, North Carolina	Underwater Welder	Week 2	15-19	
Josh Young	28	Bethlehem, Pennsylvania	Harvard Grad Student	Week 2	15-19	
Kaleb Kim	26	Norcross, Georgia	Construction Salesman	Week 2	15-19	
Spencer Storbeck	32	Moorpark, California	Medical Sales Director	Week 2	15-19	
Chris Spell	27	White Plains, New York	World Record Jumper	Week 1	20-25	
Joe Menzia	31	Ramsey, Minnesota	Tech Operations Director	Week 1	20-25	
Khalid Hassan	28	Dearborn, Michigan	Tech Recruiter	Week 1	20-25	
Nicholas "Nic" Barber	32	Berkeley Heights, New Jersey	HR Executive	Week 1	20-25	
Peter Cappio	33	Armonk, New York	Airline Pilot	Week 1	20-25	
Taylor Pegg	32	Beavercreek, Ohio	Loan Officer	Week 1	20-25	

=== Future appearances ===
==== The Bachelor ====
Joey Graziadei was chosen as the lead for season 28 of The Bachelor.

==== Bachelor in Paradise ====
Season 9

Aaron Bryant, Aaron Schwartzman, Brayden Bowers, John Buresh, John Henry Spurlock, Michael Barbour, Peter Cappio, Sean McLaughlin, Tanner Courtad, and Taylor Pegg returned for season 9 of Bachelor in Paradise. Buresh, McLaughlin, and Schwartzmann were eliminated in week 2. Bowers and Pegg were eliminated in week 4. Courtad split from Jess Girod, Cappio split from Sam Picco, and Barbour split from Olivia Lewis in week 5. Bryant and Spurlock got engaged to Eliza Isichei and Kat Izzo, respectively, in week 5.

==== Bachelor in Paradise ====
Season 10

McLaughlin returned for Season 10. He was eliminated and left in a relationship with Allyshia Gupta in week 7.

==== Dancing with the Stars ====
Season 32

Charity Lawson competed in season 32 of Dancing with the Stars where she partnered with Artem Chigvintsev. They finished in fourth place.

Season 33

Joey Graziadei competed in, and won, season 33 of Dancing with the Stars with his partner Jenna Johnson.

==== The Traitors ====
In 2026, Graziadei competed on the sixth season of The Traitors.

== Call-out order ==
Order	Bachelors	Week							
Order	Bachelors	1	2	3	4	5	6	7	8
1	Aaron B.	Brayden	Aaron B.	Brayden	Dotun	Joey	Dotun	Joey	Dotun
2	Josh	Aaron B.	John	Dotun	Joey	Dotun	Xavier	Dotun	Joey
3	Joey	John	Joey	Aaron B.	Xavier	Aaron B.	Joey	Aaron B.	
4	Warwick	Xavier	Dotun	Caleb B.	Aaron B.	Xavier	Aaron B.	Xavier	
5	Xavier	Joey	Tanner	Xavier	Tanner	Tanner			
6	Caleb A.	Caleb B.	Caleb B.	Joey	Sean	Sean			
7	Khalid	Warwick	Warwick	Michael	Caleb B. John; Michael				
8	Nic	Aaron S.	Michael	John	Caleb B. John; Michael				
9	John Henry	Caleb A.	Sean	Sean	Caleb B. John; Michael				
10	Aaron S.	Adrian	Xavier	Tanner	Brayden				
11	Tanner	James	Aaron S.	Aaron S. Adrian; James					
12	Chris	Sean	James	Aaron S. Adrian; James					
13	Brayden	Michael	Adrian	Aaron S. Adrian; James					
14	Spencer	Tanner	Brayden	Warwick					
15	Caleb B.	Dotun	Caleb A. John Henry; Josh; Kaleb K. Spencer						
16	Joe	Kaleb K.	Caleb A. John Henry; Josh; Kaleb K. Spencer						
17	Kaleb K.	John Henry	Caleb A. John Henry; Josh; Kaleb K. Spencer						
18	Adrian	Josh	Caleb A. John Henry; Josh; Kaleb K. Spencer						
19	James	Spencer	Caleb A. John Henry; Josh; Kaleb K. Spencer						
20	Peter	Chris; Joe; Khalid; Nic; Peter; Taylor							
21	Michael	Chris; Joe; Khalid; Nic; Peter; Taylor							
22	Taylor	Chris; Joe; Khalid; Nic; Peter; Taylor							
23	Sean	Chris; Joe; Khalid; Nic; Peter; Taylor							
24	John	Chris; Joe; Khalid; Nic; Peter; Taylor							
25	Dotun	Chris; Joe; Khalid; Nic; Peter; Taylor							

The contestant received the first impression rose
The contestant received a rose during a date
The contestant was eliminated
The contestant was eliminated during a date
The contestant was eliminated outside the rose ceremony
The contestant quit the competition
The contestant won the competition

== Episodes ==
No. overall	No. in season	Title	Original release date	Prod. code	U.S. viewers (millions)	Rating (18–49)
216	1	"Week 1: Season Premiere"	June 26, 2023	2001	1.92	0.4
217	2	"Week 2"	July 3, 2023	2002	1.77	0.3
218	3	"Week 3: San Diego"	July 10, 2023	2003	1.93	0.4
219	4	"Week 4: Washington"	July 17, 2023	2004	2.14	0.4
220	5	"Week 5: New Orleans"	July 24, 2023	2005	2.59	0.5
221	6	"Week 6: Hometowns"	July 31, 2023	2006	2.53	0.4
222	7	"Week 7: Fantasy Suites"	August 7, 2023	2007	2.98	0.6
223	8	"The Men Tell All"	August 14, 2023	N/A	2.64	0.4
224	9	"Week 8: Season Finale & After the Final Rose"	August 21, 2023	2008	2.99	0.5
