= Charity Lawson =

American television personality

- Born: December 30, 1995 (age 30); Burlington, New Jersey, U.S.
- Education: Auburn University (BS, MA)
- Occupation: Television personality
- Years active: 2022–present

Charity Lawson (born December 30, 1995) is an American television personality who appeared on season 27 of The Bachelor, and starred in season 20 of The Bachelorette.

== Early life and education ==
Lawson was born in Burlington, New Jersey, and raised in Columbus, Georgia. She has two older siblings.

Lawson attended Auburn University, where she received her Bachelor of Science in rehabilitation and disability and her Masters in clinical mental health counseling. Following her graduation, she remained in Auburn and worked as a child therapist.

== Television shows ==
=== The Bachelor ===
In January 2023, Lawson was revealed to be a contestant on season 27 of The Bachelor, starring Zach Shallcross. She finished the season in fourth place, being sent home in the rose ceremony following hometowns.

=== The Bachelorette ===
Lawson was announced as The Bachelorette on March 14, 2023, during The Women Tell All. On August 7, 2023, she became engaged to contestant Dotun Olubeko.

Lawson made a guest appearance in season 21 of show, starring Jenn Tran.

=== Dancing with the Stars ===
On August 21, 2023, during the After the Final Rose special, it was announced that Lawson would compete in season 32 of Dancing with the Stars. She was partnered with professional dancer Artem Chigvintsev. Chigvintsev tested positive for COVID-19 in October, 2023, and was replaced by Ezra Sosa for the second week of the competition. Lawson and Chigvintsev made it to the final episode of the season, where they finished in fourth place.

== Personal life ==
Lawson has been engaged to Dotun Olubeko since August 7, 2023. They currently reside in New York City.

Preceded by Rachel Recchia; Gabby Windey	The Bachelorette; Season 20	Succeeded by Jenn Tran
