= Dancing with the Stars (American TV series) season 32 =

Dancing with the Stars
- Season 32
- Promotional poster for season 32, featuring hosts Alfonso Ribeiro and Julianne Hough, and the celebrity cast
- Hosted by: Alfonso Ribeiro; Julianne Hough
- Judges: Derek Hough; Carrie Ann Inaba; Bruno Tonioli
- Celebrity winner: Xochitl Gomez
- Professional winner: Val Chmerkovskiy
- No. of episodes: 11

Release
- Original network: ABC; Disney+
- Original release: September 26 – December 5, 2023

Season chronology
- ← Previous; Season 31 Next → Season 33

Season thirty-two of Dancing with the Stars premiered on ABC and Disney+ on September 26, 2023, and concluded on December 5, 2023. This season was the first to air live on both simultaneously. Season nineteen champion Alfonso Ribeiro hosted the installment, while former professional dancer and judge Julianne Hough joined as co-host.

Actress Xochitl Gomez and Val Chmerkovskiy were crowned the champions, while singer-songwriter Jason Mraz and Daniella Karagach finished in second place, Vanderpump Rules cast member Ariana Madix and Pasha Pashkov finished in third place, The Bachelorette star Charity Lawson and Artem Chigvintsev finished in fourth, and actress Alyson Hannigan and Sasha Farber finished in fifth.

== Cast ==
=== Couples ===
On July 7, 2023, Ariana Madix was the first celebrity participant announced for the season. On August 21, 2023, The Bachelorette star Charity Lawson was announced as the second celebrity participant during the season 20 After the Final Rose special. On August 28, 2023, it was reported that Mira Sorvino was the third celebrity participant to join the cast. On September 12, 2023, it was announced that Jamie Lynn Spears was the fourth celebrity participant to join the cast and would be partnered with Alan Bersten. The full roster of celebrity participants and their partnerships was officially revealed on Good Morning America on September 13. On September 21, 2023, Matt Walsh announced that he was pausing his involvement with the season until the WGA strike and the AMPTP come to an agreement. On September 25, Walsh officially rejoined the lineup after a tentative agreement between the writers and the studios was made.

On November 20, 2022, Cheryl Burke announced her final retirement from the show after 26 seasons. On March 13, 2023, Mark Ballas reported his retirement from the show after 20 seasons. On August 27, 2023, it was announced that Witney Carson would not be returning this season. On August 31, 2023, Louis van Amstel confirmed that he would also not be returning as a professional dancer. Jenna Johnson returned to the lineup after taking the previous season off. Rylee Arnold, younger sister of Lindsay Arnold and former Dancing with the Stars: Juniors pro, joined the show as a first time-pro.

On October 3, 2023, Artem Chigvintsev announced that he had tested positive for COVID-19 and would miss that night's performance. Ezra Sosa replaced him as Charity Lawson's dance partner for the week.

Cast of Dancing with the Stars (season 32)
| Celebrity | Notability | Professional partner | Status | Ref. |
|---|---|---|---|---|
| Matt Walsh | Comedian & actor | Koko Iwasaki | Eliminated 1st on September 26, 2023 | |
| Jamie Lynn Spears | Zoey 101 actress & singer | Alan Bersten | Eliminated 2nd on October 3, 2023 | |
| Tyson Beckford | Supermodel | Jenna Johnson | Eliminated 3rd on October 10, 2023 | |
| Adrian Peterson | NFL running back | Britt Stewart | Eliminated 4th on October 17, 2023 | |
| Mira Sorvino | Film & television actress | Gleb Savchenko | Eliminated 5th on October 24, 2023 | |
| Mauricio Umansky | Reality television personality & real estate broker | Emma Slater | Eliminated 6th on October 31, 2023 | |
| Lele Pons | Social media personality & singer | Brandon Armstrong | Eliminated 7th on November 7, 2023 | |
| Barry Williams | The Brady Bunch actor | Peta Murgatroyd | Eliminated 8th on November 14, 2023 | |
| Harry Jowsey | Too Hot to Handle contestant | Rylee Arnold | Eliminated 9th on November 21, 2023 | |
| Alyson Hannigan | Film & television actress | Sasha Farber | Fifth place on December 5, 2023 | |
| Charity Lawson | The Bachelorette star | Artem Chigvintsev; Ezra Sosa (Week 2) | Fourth place on December 5, 2023 | |
| Ariana Madix | Vanderpump Rules cast member | Pasha Pashkov | Third place on December 5, 2023 | |
| Jason Mraz | Singer-songwriter | Daniella Karagach | Runners-up on December 5, 2023 | |
| Xochitl Gomez | Film & television actress | Val Chmerkovskiy | Winners on December 5, 2023 | |

=== Hosts and judges ===
On March 17, 2023, it was revealed that Tyra Banks would be leaving the series after hosting the previous three seasons. Three days later, it was announced that Julianne Hough would be joining the series as co-host, with Alfonso Ribeiro assuming Banks' previous role.

Judges Derek Hough, Carrie Ann Inaba, and Bruno Tonioli all returned for the season, with Hough being promoted to head judge, following the retirement and death of head judge Len Goodman. On October 10, Michael Strahan served as a guest judge. On October 23, it was announced that Billy Porter would serve as a guest judge on the November 14 episode, which celebrated the music of Whitney Houston. On October 27, it was announced that Niecy Nash-Betts would appear as a guest judge on the October 31 Halloween episode. On November 2, it was announced that Paula Abdul would appear as a guest judge on the November 7 episode. On November 6, it was announced that Mandy Moore would appear as a guest judge on the November 21 episode, which celebrated the music of Taylor Swift.

Beginning with this season, the Mirrorball Trophy was renamed the Len Goodman Mirrorball Trophy in Goodman's honor.

=== Dance troupe ===
The dance troupe was eliminated this season.

== Episodes ==
| No. overall | No. in season | Title | Rating (18–49) (Note: Ratings are for ABC viewership, does not include Disney+ viewership.) | Original release date | U.S. viewers (millions) |
|---|---|---|---|---|---|
| 482 | 1 | "Premiere" | 0.65 | September 26, 2023 | 4.78 |
| 483 | 2 | "Latin Night" | 0.57 | October 3, 2023 | 4.53 |
| 484 | 3 | "Motown Night" | 0.57 | October 10, 2023 | 5.13 |
| 485 | 4 | "Disney100 Night" | 0.58 | October 17, 2023 | 4.76 |
| 486 | 5 | "Most Memorable Year" | 0.53 | October 24, 2023 | 4.73 |
| 487 | 6 | "Monster Night" | 0.47 | October 31, 2023 | 4.75 |
| 488 | 7 | "Music Video Night" | 0.51 | November 7, 2023 | 4.87 |
| 489 | 8 | "Whitney Houston Night" | 0.64 | November 14, 2023 | 5.12 |
| 490 | 9 | "A Celebration of Taylor Swift" | 0.87 | November 21, 2023 | 5.70 |
| 491 | 10 | "Semifinals" | 0.64 | November 28, 2023 | 5.10 |
| 492 | 11 | "Finale" | 0.67 | December 5, 2023 | 5.50 |

== Scoring chart ==
The highest score each week is indicated in bold green with a dagger (†), while the lowest score each week is indicated in italicized red with a double-dagger (‡).

Color key:

Winners
Runners-up
Third place
Fourth place
Fifth place
Bottom two
Eliminated

Dancing with the Stars (season 32) - Weekly scores
| Couple | Pl. | Week | | | | | | | | | | | |
| Couple | Pl. | 1 | 2 | 3 (Note: The couples were scored on a 40-point scale due to the presence of a guest judge.) | 4 | 5 | 6 | 7 | 8 | 9 | 10 | 11 | 10+11 |
|---|---|---|---|---|---|---|---|---|---|---|---|---|---|
| Xochitl & Val | 1st | 18 | **24**† | 32 | **27**† | **28**† | 37+5=**42**† | 34+40=**74**† | 40 | 38+3=41 | 30+30=**60**† | 30+30=**60**† | **120**† (Note: This couple finished in first place.) |
| Jason & Daniella | 2nd | 21 | **24**† | **34**† | 24 | 27 | 36+3=39 | 35+37=72 | 33 | 40+3=**43**† | 27+30=57 | 30+30=**60**† | 117 (Note: This couple finished in second place.) |
| Ariana & Pasha | 3rd | 21 | 20 | **34**† | 25 | 24 | 37+4=41 | 37+37=**74**† | 39+3=**42**† | 37 | 28+30=58 | 29+30=59 | 117 (Note: This couple finished in third place.) |
| Charity & Artem | 4th | **22**† | 21 | 32 | 24 | **28**† | 35+3=38 | 32+40=72 | 36+3=39 | 38 | 29+30=59 | 29+30=59 | 118 (Note: This couple finished in fourth place.) |
| Alyson & Sasha | 5th | 13 | 19 | 24 | 18‡ | 21 | 29+2=31 | 33+37=70 | 33+3=36 | 29+3=32 | 25+26=51‡ | 25+28=53‡ | 104‡ (Note: This couple finished in fifth place.) |
| Harry & Rylee | 6th | 12‡ | 15 | 24 | 21 | 18‡ | 28+1=29‡ | 24+40=64‡ | 28‡ | 30‡ (Note: This couple was eliminated.) | | | |
| Barry & Peta | 7th | 16 | 15 | 25 | 18‡ | 24 | 31+1=32 | 28+37=65 | 32+3=35 | | | | |
| Lele & Brandon | 8th | 19 | 21 | 27 | 22 | 24 | 33+4=37 | 33+40=73 | | | | | |
| Mauricio & Emma | 9th | 15 (Note: This couple was in the bottom two, but was not eliminated.) | 12‡ | 23 | 19 | 24 | 31+2=33 | | | | | | |
| Mira & Gleb | 10th | 17 | 18 | 26 | 21 | 22 | | | | | | | |
| Adrian & Britt | 11th | 18 | 15 | 22 | 21 | | | | | | | | |
| Tyson & Jenna | 12th | 12‡ | 18 | 20‡ | | | | | | | | | |
| Jamie Lynn & Alan | 13th | 15 | 16 | | | | | | | | | | |
| Matt & Koko | 14th | 12‡ | | | | | | | | | | | |

== Weekly scores ==
Individual judges' scores in the charts below (given in parentheses) are listed in this order from left to right: Carrie Ann Inaba, Derek Hough, Bruno Tonioli.

=== Week 1: Premiere ===
Couples are listed in the order they performed.

In a change of format, there was no judges' save. After the bottom two were announced, the couple with the lowest combined total was eliminated.

Dancing with the Stars (season 32) - Week 1
| Couple | Scores | Dance | Music | Result |
|---|---|---|---|---|
| Xochitl & Val | 18 (6, 6, 6) | Cha-cha-cha | "Peanut Butter Jelly" — Galantis | Safe |
| Barry & Peta | 16 (6, 5, 5) | Foxtrot | "It's a Sunshine Day" — The Brady Bunch | Safe |
| Tyson & Jenna | 12 (4, 4, 4) | Cha-cha-cha | "Never Too Much" — Luther Vandross | Safe |
| Alyson & Sasha | 13 (5, 4, 4) | Salsa | "Never Gonna Not Dance Again" — Pink | Safe |
| Harry & Rylee | 12 (4, 4, 4) | Cha-cha-cha | "Rock Your Body" — Justin Timberlake | Safe |
| Jason & Daniella | 21 (7, 7, 7) | Cha-cha-cha | "I Feel Like Dancing" — Jason Mraz | Safe |
| Jamie Lynn & Alan | 15 (5, 5, 5) | Tango | "Don't Call Me Up (Zac Samuel Remix)" — Mabel | Safe |
| Adrian & Britt | 18 (6, 6, 6) | Salsa | "Yeah!" — Usher | Safe |
| Lele & Brandon | 19 (6, 7, 6) | Tango | "El Tango de Roxanne" — from Moulin Rouge! | Safe |
| Mira & Gleb | 17 (6, 5, 6) | Cha-cha-cha | "Kiss" — Prince & The Revolution | Safe |
| Mauricio & Emma | 15 (5, 5, 5) | Jive | "I Ain't Worried" — OneRepublic | Bottom two |
| Charity & Artem | 22 (7, 7, 8) | Tango | "Only Girl (In the World)" — Rihanna | Safe |
| Matt & Koko | 12 (4, 4, 4) | Cha-cha-cha | "Poison" — Bell Biv DeVoe | Eliminated |
| Ariana & Pasha | 21 (7, 7, 7) | Tango | "Love Myself (Riddler Remix)" — Hailee Steinfeld | Safe |

=== Week 2: Latin Night ===
Couples are listed in the order they performed.

Artem Chigvintsev tested positive for COVID-19, so Charity Lawson performed with Ezra Sosa instead.

Dancing with the Stars (season 32) - Week 2
| Couple | Scores | Dance | Music | Result |
|---|---|---|---|---|
| Lele & Brandon | 21 (7, 7, 7) | Samba | "Gasolina" — Daddy Yankee | Safe |
| Tyson & Jenna | 18 (6, 6, 6) | Salsa | "Aguanilé" — Willie Colón & Héctor Lavoe | Safe |
| Barry & Peta | 15 (5, 5, 5) | Cha-cha-cha | "Oye Cómo Va" — Tito Puente | Safe |
| Adrian & Britt | 15 (5, 5, 5) | Samba | "Taki Taki" — DJ Snake, feat. Selena Gomez, Ozuna & Cardi B | Bottom two |
| Mira & Gleb | 18 (6, 6, 6) | Salsa | "Bailando" — Enrique Iglesias | Safe |
| Xochitl & Val | 24 (8, 8, 8) | Salsa | "Don't Go Yet" — Camila Cabello | Safe |
| Ariana & Pasha | 20 (6, 7, 7) | Samba | "Me Porto Bonito" — Bad Bunny & Chencho Corleone | Safe |
| Mauricio & Emma | 12 (4, 4, 4) | Salsa | "Quimbara" — Celia Cruz, Willie Colón, Johnny Pacheco Y Su Charanga | Safe |
| Alyson & Sasha | 19 (7, 6, 6) | Tango | "Can't Remember to Forget You" — Shakira, feat. Rihanna | Safe |
| Charity & Ezra | 21 (7, 7, 7) | Cha-cha-cha | "She Bangs" — Ricky Martin | Safe |
| Harry & Rylee | 15 (5, 5, 5) | Salsa | "Arranca" — Becky G, feat. Omega | Safe |
| Jamie Lynn & Alan | 16 (6, 5, 5) | Cha-cha-cha | "Shake Señora" — Pitbull, feat. T-Pain & Sean Paul | Eliminated |
| Jason & Daniella | 24 (8, 8, 8) | Rumba | "Quizás, Quizás, Quizás" — Andrea Bocelli, feat. Jennifer Lopez | Safe |

=== Week 3: Motown Night ===
Individual judges' scores in the charts below are listed in following order from left to right: Carrie Ann Inaba, Derek Hough, Michael Strahan, Bruno Tonioli.

Good Morning America co-anchor Michael Strahan appeared as a guest judge.

Couples are listed in the order they performed.

Dancing with the Stars (season 32) - Week 3
| Couple | Scores | Dance | Music | Result |
|---|---|---|---|---|
| Barry & Peta | 25 (6, 6, 7, 6) | Tango | "Get Ready" — The Temptations | Safe |
| Lele & Brandon | 27 (7, 6, 7, 7) | Cha-cha-cha | "Super Freak" — Rick James | Safe |
| Mauricio & Emma | 23 (7, 5, 6, 5) | Foxtrot | "Working My Way Back to You" — The Spinners | Safe |
| Jason & Daniella | 34 (9, 8, 9, 8) | Jive | "Do You Love Me" — The Contours | Safe |
| Alyson & Sasha | 24 (6, 6, 6, 6) | Foxtrot | "Ain't No Mountain High Enough" — Marvin Gaye & Tammi Terrell | Safe |
| Tyson & Jenna | 20 (5, 5, 5, 5) | Foxtrot | "Master Blaster (Jammin')" — Stevie Wonder | Eliminated |
| Charity & Artem | 32 (8, 8, 8, 8) | Foxtrot | "My Girl" — The Temptations | Safe |
| Mira & Gleb | 26 (6, 6, 7, 7) | Rumba | "Let's Get It On" — Marvin Gaye | Safe |
| Ariana & Pasha | 34 (9, 8, 9, 8) | Quickstep | "You Can't Hurry Love" — The Supremes | Safe |
| Adrian & Britt | 22 (5, 5, 6, 6) | Quickstep | "I Want You Back" — The Jackson 5 | Safe |
| Harry & Rylee | 24 (6, 5, 7, 6) | Foxtrot | "Easy" — Commodores | Safe |
| Xochitl & Val | 32 (8, 8, 8, 8) | Foxtrot | "My Guy" — Mary Wells | Safe |

=== Week 4: Disney100 Night ===
Couples are listed in the order they performed.

Dancing with the Stars (season 32) - Week 4
| Couple | Scores | Dance | Music | Disney film | Result |
|---|---|---|---|---|---|
| Mauricio & Emma | 19 (7, 6, 6) | Paso doble | "The Sorcerer's Apprentice" | Fantasia | Safe |
| Mira & Gleb | 21 (7, 7, 7) | Waltz | "A Dream Is a Wish Your Heart Makes" | Cinderella | Safe |
| Barry & Peta | 18 (6, 6, 6) | Jazz | "He's a Tramp" | Lady and the Tramp | Safe |
| Jason & Daniella | 24 (8, 8, 8) | Foxtrot | "A Whole New World" | Aladdin | Safe |
| Lele & Brandon | 22 (7, 7, 8) | Rumba | "Can You Feel the Love Tonight" | The Lion King | Safe |
| Alyson & Sasha | 18 (6, 6, 6) | Jazz | "Be Our Guest" | Beauty and the Beast | Safe |
| Harry & Rylee | 21 (7, 7, 7) | Quickstep | "You've Got a Friend in Me" | Toy Story | Safe |
| Xochitl & Val | 27 (9, 9, 9) | Paso doble | "Un Poco Loco" | Coco | Safe |
| Adrian & Britt | 21 (7, 7, 7) | Viennese waltz | "Baby Mine" | Dumbo | Eliminated |
| Ariana & Pasha | 25 (8, 9, 8) | Contemporary | "Into the Unknown" | Frozen II | Safe |
| Charity & Artem | 24 (8, 8, 8) | Waltz | "Part of Your World" | The Little Mermaid | Safe |

=== Week 5: Most Memorable Year ===
Siblings Derek & Julianne Hough, Kym Herjavec, Anna Trebunskaya, Karina Smirnoff, Edyta Śliwińska, Tony Dovolani, Louis van Amstel, Maks Chmerkovskiy, and Mark Ballas returned alongside the current professional dancers to perform a tribute waltz to "Moon River" in honor of Len Goodman. The dance was choreographed by Val Chmerkovskiy and Jenna Johnson.

Couples are listed in the order they performed.

Dancing with the Stars (season 32) - Week 5
| Couple | Scores | Dance | Music | Result |
|---|---|---|---|---|
| Mira & Gleb | 22 (7, 8, 7) | Contemporary | "Time After Time" — Cyndi Lauper | Eliminated |
| Ariana & Pasha | 24 (8, 8, 8) | Viennese waltz | "Happier Than Ever" — Billie Eilish | Safe |
| Charity & Artem | 28 (10, 9, 9) | Contemporary | "Lose You to Love Me" — Selena Gomez | Safe |
| Alyson & Sasha | 21 (7, 7, 7) | Viennese waltz | "Perfect" — Ed Sheeran | Safe |
| Harry & Rylee | 18 (6, 6, 6) | Contemporary | "Keep Your Head Up" — Andy Grammer | Safe |
| Jason & Daniella | 27 (9, 9, 9) | Quickstep | "On the Road Again" — Willie Nelson | Safe |
| Lele & Brandon | 24 (8, 8, 8) | Contemporary | "I'll Stand by You" — The Pretenders | Safe |
| Xochitl & Val | 28 (9, 10, 9) | Viennese waltz | "Until I Found You" — Stephen Sanchez | Safe |
| Mauricio & Emma | 24 (8, 8, 8) | Contemporary | "Rise Up" — Andra Day | Safe |
| Barry & Peta | 24 (8, 8, 8) | Paso doble | "Born to Be Wild" — Steppenwolf | Safe |

=== Week 6: Monster Night ===
Individual judges' scores in the charts below are listed in following order from left to right: Carrie Ann Inaba, Derek Hough, Niecy Nash-Betts, Bruno Tonioli.

Actress Niecy Nash-Betts appeared as a guest judge.

Each couple performed one unlearned dance and then participated in a dance marathon (featuring the hustle and the Charleston) for bonus points. Couples are listed in the order they performed.

Dancing with the Stars (season 32) - Week 6
| Couple | Scores | Dance | Music | Result |
|---|---|---|---|---|
| Jason & Daniella | 36 (9, 9, 9, 9) | Contemporary | "Zombie" — The Cranberries | Safe |
| Alyson & Sasha | 29 (7, 7, 7, 8) | Paso doble | "Supermassive Black Hole" — Muse | Safe |
| Xochitl & Val | 37 (9, 9, 10, 9) | Contemporary | "Game of Survival" — Ruelle | Safe |
| Harry & Rylee | 28 (7, 7, 7, 7) | Argentine tango | "Blinding Lights" — District 78 | Safe |
| Barry & Peta | 31 (8, 7, 8, 8) | Viennese waltz | "It's a Man's Man's Man's World" — James Brown | Safe |
| Ariana & Pasha | 37 (9, 9, 9, 10) | Argentine tango | "Bad Guy" — Billie Eilish | Safe |
| Lele & Brandon | 33 (8, 8, 8, 9) | Paso doble | "Bloody Mary" (TikTok Remix) — Lady Gaga | Safe |
| Mauricio & Emma | 31 (8, 8, 7, 8) | Argentine tango | "Somebody's Watching Me" — Rockwell | Eliminated |
| Charity & Artem | 35 (9, 9, 8, 9) | Jive | "Skeleton Sam" — LVCRFT | Safe |
| Barry & Peta | 1 | Hustle & Charleston; Marathon | "Stayin' Alive" — Bee Gees & "Grim Grinning Ghosts" — Kris Bowers | |
| Harry & Rylee | 1 | Hustle & Charleston; Marathon | "Stayin' Alive" — Bee Gees & "Grim Grinning Ghosts" — Kris Bowers | |
| Alyson & Sasha | 2 | Hustle & Charleston; Marathon | "Stayin' Alive" — Bee Gees & "Grim Grinning Ghosts" — Kris Bowers | |
| Mauricio & Emma | 2 | Hustle & Charleston; Marathon | "Stayin' Alive" — Bee Gees & "Grim Grinning Ghosts" — Kris Bowers | |
| Charity & Artem | 3 | Hustle & Charleston; Marathon | "Stayin' Alive" — Bee Gees & "Grim Grinning Ghosts" — Kris Bowers | |
| Jason & Daniella | 3 | Hustle & Charleston; Marathon | "Stayin' Alive" — Bee Gees & "Grim Grinning Ghosts" — Kris Bowers | |
| Lele & Brandon | 4 | Hustle & Charleston; Marathon | "Stayin' Alive" — Bee Gees & "Grim Grinning Ghosts" — Kris Bowers | |
| Ariana & Pasha | 4 | Hustle & Charleston; Marathon | "Stayin' Alive" — Bee Gees & "Grim Grinning Ghosts" — Kris Bowers | |
| Xochitl & Val | 5 | Hustle & Charleston; Marathon | "Stayin' Alive" — Bee Gees & "Grim Grinning Ghosts" — Kris Bowers | |

=== Week 7: Music Video Night ===
Individual judges' scores in the charts below are listed in following order from left to right: Carrie Ann Inaba, Derek Hough, Paula Abdul, Bruno Tonioli.

Singer, dancer, and choreographer Paula Abdul appeared as a guest judge.

Each couple performed one unlearned dance and participated in a team dance. For receiving the highest score in the first round, Ariana & Pasha received immunity from the dance-offs to be held the following week, and would also receive bonus points next week. Couples are listed in the order they performed.

Dancing with the Stars (season 32) - Week 7
| Couple | Scores | Dance | Music | Result |
|---|---|---|---|---|
| Lele & Brandon | 33 (9, 8, 8, 8) | Salsa | "Whenever, Wherever" — Shakira | Eliminated |
| Ariana & Pasha | 37 (9, 9, 10, 9) | Cha-cha-cha | "I'm a Slave 4 U" — Britney Spears | Safe |
| Harry & Rylee | 24 (6, 6, 6, 6) | Jazz | "It's Gonna Be Me" — NSYNC | Safe |
| Jason & Daniella | 35 (8, 8, 10, 9) | Jazz | "Take On Me" — a-ha | Safe |
| Alyson & Sasha | 33 (8, 8, 9, 8) | Quickstep | "Candyman" — Christina Aguilera | Safe |
| Xochitl & Val | 34 (9, 8, 9, 8) | Jazz | "Hollaback Girl" — Gwen Stefani | Safe |
| Charity & Artem | 32 (8, 8, 8, 8) | Jazz | "All for You" — Janet Jackson | Safe |
| Barry & Peta | 28 (7, 7, 7, 7) | Quickstep | "I'm Still Standing" — Elton John | Safe |
| Charity & Artem Harry & Rylee Lele & Brandon Xochitl & Val | 40 (10, 10, 10, 10) | Freestyle (Team Young'n Style) | "Gangnam Style" — Psy | |
| Alyson & Sasha Ariana & Pasha Barry & Peta Jason & Daniella | 37 (9, 9, 10, 9) | Freestyle (Team 4 Everybody) | "Everybody (Backstreet's Back)" — Backstreet Boys | |

=== Week 8: Whitney Houston Night ===
Individual judges' scores in the charts below are listed in following order from left to right: Carrie Ann Inaba, Derek Hough, Billy Porter, Bruno Tonioli.

Actor-singer Billy Porter appeared as a guest judge.

The couples performed one unlearned dance, and a dance-off for three extra points, to songs by Whitney Houston. Ariana & Pasha were exempt from the dance-off, but they automatically received three bonus points for having finished first at the end of the first round the previous week. Couples are listed in the order they performed.

Dancing with the Stars (season 32) - Week 8
| Couple | Scores | Dance | Whitney Houston music | Result |
|---|---|---|---|---|
| Harry & Rylee | 28 (7, 7, 7, 7) | Viennese waltz | "I Have Nothing" | Safe |
| Jason & Daniella | 33 (8, 9, 8, 8) | Samba | "Higher Love" | Safe |
| Alyson & Sasha | 33 (8, 8, 9, 8) | Contemporary | "The Greatest Love of All" | Safe |
| Xochitl & Val | 40 (10, 10, 10, 10) | Tango | "I Wanna Dance with Somebody (Who Loves Me)" | Safe |
| Barry & Peta | 32 (8, 8, 8, 8) | Rumba | "Didn't We Almost Have It All" | Eliminated |
| Charity & Artem | 36 (9, 9, 9, 9) | Viennese waltz | "I Will Always Love You" | Safe |
| Ariana & Pasha | 39 (9, 10, 10, 10) | Paso doble | "Queen of the Night" | Safe |

Dance-offs
| Couple | Dance | Whitney Houston music | Result |
|---|---|---|---|
| Alyson & Sasha | Rumba | "One Moment in Time" | Winners |
| Harry & Rylee | Rumba | "One Moment in Time" | Losers |
| Barry & Peta | Salsa | "It's Not Right but It's Okay" | Winners |
| Jason & Daniella | Salsa | "It's Not Right but It's Okay" | Losers |
| Charity & Artem | Cha-cha-cha | "So Emotional" | Winners |
| Xochitl & Val | Cha-cha-cha | "So Emotional" | Losers |

=== Week 9: A Celebration of Taylor Swift ===
Individual judges' scores in the charts below are listed in following order from left to right: Carrie Ann Inaba, Derek Hough, Mandy Moore, Bruno Tonioli.

Choreographer and former Dancing with the Stars: Juniors judge Mandy Moore, who choreographed Taylor Swift's Eras Tour, appeared as a guest judge.

The couples performed one unlearned dance, and a dance relay for three extra points, to songs by Taylor Swift. Couples are listed in the order they performed.

Dancing with the Stars (season 32) - Week 9
| Couple | Scores | Dance | Taylor Swift music | Result |
|---|---|---|---|---|
| Alyson & Sasha | 29 (7, 7, 8, 7) | Cha-cha-cha | "You Belong with Me" | Safe |
| Ariana & Pasha | 37 (9, 9, 9, 10) | Rumba | "Cruel Summer" | Safe |
| Jason & Daniella | 40 (10, 10, 10, 10) | Argentine tango | "Don't Blame Me" | Safe |
| Harry & Rylee | 30 (8, 7, 8, 7) | Rumba | "August" | Eliminated |
| Charity & Artem | 38 (9, 10, 9, 10) | Argentine tango | "Look What You Made Me Do" | Safe |
| Xochitl & Val | 38 (9, 9, 10, 10) | Quickstep | "Paper Rings" | Safe |

Dance relay
| Couple | Dance | Taylor Swift music | Result |
|---|---|---|---|
| Xochitl & Val | Viennese waltz Relay | "Lover" | Winners |
| Ariana & Pasha | Viennese waltz Relay | "Lover" | Losers |
| Alyson & Sasha | Jive; Relay | "Shake It Off" | Winners |
| Harry & Rylee | Jive; Relay | "Shake It Off" | Losers |
| Jason & Daniella | Cha-cha-cha; Relay | "Lavender Haze (Felix Jaehn Remix)" | Winners |
| Charity & Artem | Cha-cha-cha; Relay | "Lavender Haze (Felix Jaehn Remix)" | Losers |

=== Week 10: Semifinals ===
Each couple performed one unlearned Latin dance and one unlearned ballroom dance. Couples are listed in the order they performed.

At the end of the episode, after the final two were revealed, it was announced that no one would be eliminated, and that all scores and votes would carry over to the finale.

Dancing with the Stars (season 32) - Week 10
| Couple | Scores | Dance | Music |
|---|---|---|---|
| Ariana & Pasha | 28 (9, 9, 10) | Jive | "Runaway Baby" — Bruno Mars |
| Ariana & Pasha | 30 (10, 10, 10) | Foxtrot | "Trampoline" — Shaed & Zayn |
| Jason & Daniella | 27 (9, 9, 9) | Viennese waltz | "I Won't Give Up" — Jason Mraz |
| Jason & Daniella | 30 (10, 10, 10) | Paso doble | "Diablo Rojo" — Rodrigo y Gabriela |
| Xochitl & Val | 30 (10, 10, 10) | Samba | "Samba" — Gloria Estefan |
| Xochitl & Val | 30 (10, 10, 10) | Waltz | "La Vie en rose" — Lady Gaga |
| Charity & Artem | 29 (10, 9, 10) | Rumba | "Love the Way You Lie (Part III)" — Skylar Grey |
| Charity & Artem | 30 (10, 10, 10) | Quickstep | "Boss" — Fifth Harmony |
| Alyson & Sasha | 25 (9, 8, 8) | Jive | "Footloose" — Kenny Loggins |
| Alyson & Sasha | 26 (8, 9, 9) | Waltz | "Come Away with Me" — Norah Jones |

=== Week 11: Finale ===
All eliminated couples from this season performed to "Young Hearts Run Free" by Candi Staton. A Mariah Carey Christmas number featuring Witney Carson, Hélio Castroneves, Hannah Brown, Rashad Jennings, and "the song and dance styles of Alfonso Ribeiro and Julianne Hough" was performed as well. Season 31 champions Charli D'Amelio & Mark Ballas returned to perform. Jason Mraz also performed his song "I Feel Like Dancing."

Each couple performed one redemption dance coached by one of the judges, and their freestyle. Couples are listed in the order they performed.

Dancing with the Stars (season 32) - Week 11
| Couple | Scores | Dance | Music | Result |
|---|---|---|---|---|
| Alyson & Sasha | 25 (9, 8, 8) | Salsa | "Get on Your Feet" — Gloria Estefan | Fifth place |
| Alyson & Sasha | 28 (9, 9, 10) | Freestyle | "Enchanted" — Taylor Swift & "Papi" — Jennifer Lopez | Fifth place |
| Jason & Daniella | 30 (10, 10, 10) | Foxtrot | "Fly Me to the Moon" — Frank Sinatra | Runners-up |
| Jason & Daniella | 30 (10, 10, 10) | Freestyle | "Happy" — C2C, feat. Derek Martin | Runners-up |
| Ariana & Pasha | 29 (9, 10, 10) | Samba | "Spice Up Your Life" — Spice Girls | Third place |
| Ariana & Pasha | 30 (10, 10, 10) | Freestyle | "Run the World (Girls)" — Beyoncé & "Level Up" — Ciara | Third place |
| Charity & Artem | 29 (9, 10, 10) | Tango | "Libertango" — Astor Piazzolla | Fourth place |
| Charity & Artem | 30 (10, 10, 10) | Freestyle | "Lose My Breath" — Destiny's Child & "Suéltate" — Sam i & Jarina De Marco, feat. Anitta & BIA | Fourth place |
| Xochitl & Val | 30 (10, 10, 10) | Foxtrot | "Unconditionally" — Katy Perry | Winners |
| Xochitl & Val | 30 (10, 10, 10) | Freestyle | "Que Calor" — District 78 | Winners |

== Dance chart ==
The couples performed the following each week:

- Weeks 1–5: One unlearned dance
- Week 6: One unlearned dance & dance marathon
- Week 7: One unlearned dance & team dance
- Week 8: One unlearned dance & dance-off
- Week 9: One unlearned dance & dance relay
- Week 10 (Semifinals): One unlearned Latin dance & one unlearned ballroom dance
- Week 11 (Finals): Redemption dance & freestyle

Dancing with the Stars (season 32) - Dance chart
| Couple | Week | | | | | | | | | | | | | | | | |
| Couple | 1 | 2 | 3 | 4 | 5 | 6 | | 7 | | 8 | | 9 | | 10 | | 11 | |
|---|---|---|---|---|---|---|---|---|---|---|---|---|---|---|---|---|---|
| Xochitl & Val | Cha-cha-cha | Salsa | Foxtrot | Paso doble | Viennese waltz | Contemp. | Hustle & Charleston; Marathon | Jazz | Team Freestyle | Tango | Cha-cha-cha | Quickstep | Viennese waltz | Samba | Waltz | Foxtrot | Freestyle |
| Jason & Daniella | Cha-cha-cha | Rumba | Jive | Foxtrot | Quickstep | Contemp. | Hustle & Charleston; Marathon | Jazz | Team Freestyle | Samba | Salsa | Argentine tango | Cha-cha-cha | Viennese waltz | Paso doble | Foxtrot | Freestyle |
| Ariana & Pasha | Tango | Samba | Quickstep | Contemp. | Viennese waltz | Argentine tango | Hustle & Charleston; Marathon | Cha-cha-cha | Team Freestyle | Paso doble | Immunity | Rumba | Viennese waltz | Jive | Foxtrot | Samba | Freestyle |
| Charity & Artem | Tango | Cha-cha-cha | Foxtrot | Waltz | Contemp. | Jive | Hustle & Charleston; Marathon | Jazz | Team Freestyle | Viennese waltz | Cha-cha-cha | Argentine tango | Cha-cha-cha | Rumba | Quickstep | Tango | Freestyle |
| Alyson & Sasha | Salsa | Tango | Foxtrot | Jazz | Viennese waltz | Paso doble | Hustle & Charleston; Marathon | Quickstep | Team Freestyle | Contemp. | Rumba | Cha-cha-cha | Jive | Jive | Waltz | Salsa | Freestyle |
| Harry & Rylee | Cha-cha-cha | Salsa | Foxtrot | Quickstep | Contemp. | Argentine tango | Hustle & Charleston; Marathon | Jazz | Team Freestyle | Viennese waltz | Rumba | Rumba | Jive | | | | |
| Barry & Peta | Foxtrot | Cha-cha-cha | Tango | Jazz | Paso doble | Viennese waltz | Hustle & Charleston; Marathon | Quickstep | Team Freestyle | Rumba | Salsa | | | | | | |
| Lele & Brandon | Tango | Samba | Cha-cha-cha | Rumba | Contemp. | Paso doble | Hustle & Charleston; Marathon | Salsa | Team Freestyle | | | | | | | | |
| Mauricio & Emma | Jive | Salsa | Foxtrot | Paso doble | Contemp. | Argentine tango | Hustle & Charleston; Marathon | | | | | | | | | | |
| Mira & Gleb | Cha-cha-cha | Salsa | Rumba | Waltz | Contemp. | | | | | | | | | | | | |
| Adrian & Britt | Salsa | Samba | Quickstep | Viennese waltz | | | | | | | | | | | | | |
| Tyson & Jenna | Cha-cha-cha | Salsa | Foxtrot | | | | | | | | | | | | | | |
| Jamie Lynn & Alan | Tango | Cha-cha-cha | | | | | | | | | | | | | | | |
| Matt & Koko | Cha-cha-cha | | | | | | | | | | | | | | | | |
