= Bachelor in Paradise (American TV series) season 7 =

Season of television series

Bachelor in Paradise
- Season 7
- Promotional poster
- No. of episodes: 11

Release
- Original network: ABC
- Original release: August 16 – October 5, 2021

Season chronology
- ← Previous; Season 6 Next → Season 8

The seventh season of Bachelor in Paradise premiered on August 16, 2021. In June 2021, it was confirmed that David Spade, Lil Jon, Tituss Burgess, Lance Bass and others would serve as rotating guest hosts for the seventh season, replacing original host Chris Harrison.

== Production ==
As with the previous season, filming took place in the town of Sayulita, located in Vallarta-Nayarit, Mexico. It was originally set to film and air in the summer of 2020, but it was delayed due to the COVID-19 pandemic.

=== Casting ===
On June 18, 2021, Wells Adams was confirmed to be returning as the bartender with a larger role; he will be master of ceremonies at rose ceremonies and a guest host in selected episodes.

On July 8, 2021, the first 19 contestants were revealed. On July 13, 2021, a further 4 contestants were confirmed. On August 9, 2021, former Bachelorette Becca Kufrin was confirmed to be a contestant. This made her the first former lead to compete in Bachelor In Paradise. On August 12, 2021, Demi Burnett was confirmed to be returning this season.

== Contestants ==
Name	Age	Residence	From	Arrived	Outcome
Joe Amabile	35	Chicago, Illinois	The Bachelorette – Becca; Bachelor in Paradise – Season 5	Week 1	Engaged
Serena Pitt	23	Markham, Ontario	The Bachelor – Matt	Week 1	Engaged
Kenny Braasch	40	Chicago, Illinois	The Bachelorette – Clare & Tayshia	Week 1	Engaged
Mariela "Mari" Pepin	25	Odenton, Maryland	The Bachelor – Matt	Week 1	Engaged
Riley Christian	31	Long Island City, New York	The Bachelorette – Clare & Tayshia	Week 2	Engaged
Maurissa Gunn	25	Atlanta, Georgia	The Bachelor – Peter	Week 1	Engaged
Aaron Clancy	26	San Diego, California	The Bachelorette – Katie	Week 1	Split Week 6
Tia Booth	29	Nashville, Tennessee	The Bachelor – Arie; Bachelor in Paradise – Season 5	Week 3	Split Week 6
James Bonsall	31	San Diego, California	The Bachelorette – Katie	Week 1	Split Week 6
Anna Redman	25	Chicago, Illinois	The Bachelor – Matt	Week 5	Split Week 6
Ed Waisbrot	37	Miami, Florida	The Bachelorette – Clare & Tayshia	Week 4	Split Week 6
Mykenna Dorn	24	Langley, British Columbia	The Bachelor – Peter	Week 5 (Note: Mykenna was at the VIP party in week 3, but was not brought onto the beach until week 5.)	Split Week 6
Thomas Jacobs	28	San Diego, California	The Bachelorette – Katie	Week 2	Split Week 6
Becca Kufrin	31	San Diego, California	The Bachelor – Arie; The Bachelorette – Season 14	Week 2	Split Week 6
Chelsea Vaughn	28	Brooklyn, New York	The Bachelor – Matt	Week 3	Week 5
Natasha Parker	33	New York City, New York	The Bachelor – Peter	Week 1	Week 5
Noah Erb	26	Tulsa, Oklahoma	The Bachelorette – Tayshia (Note: The contestant was one of the four men that arrived after Clare left the show in that season .)	Week 1	Split Week 6
Abigail Heringer	26	New York City, New York	The Bachelor – Matt	Week 1	Split Week 6
Blake Monar	32	Phoenix, Arizona	The Bachelorette – Clare (Note: The contestant was eliminated before Tayshia arrived in that season.)	Week 4	Week 4
Demar Jackson	27	Scottsdale, Arizona	The Bachelorette – Clare & Tayshia	Week 4	Week 4
Joe Park	37	New York City, New York	The Bachelorette – Clare & Tayshia	Week 4	Week 4
Ivan Hall	29	Dallas, Texas	The Bachelorette – Clare & Tayshia	Week 1	Week 4 (Quit)
Kendall Long	29	Santa Clarita, California	The Bachelor – Arie; Bachelor in Paradise – Season 5	Week 3	Week 4 (Quit)
Deandra Kanu	25	Plano, Texas	The Bachelor – Peter	Week 1	Week 3
Demi Burnett	26	Los Angeles, California	The Bachelor – Colton; Bachelor in Paradise – Season 6	Week 1	Week 3
Jessenia Cruz	28	San Antonio, Texas	The Bachelor – Matt	Week 1	Week 3
Tammy Ly	26	Syracuse, New York	The Bachelor – Peter	Week 1	Week 3
Brendan Morais	31	Milford, Massachusetts	The Bachelorette – Clare & Tayshia	Week 1	Week 3 (Quit)
Pieper James	23	New York City, New York	The Bachelor – Matt	Week 3	Week 3 (Quit)
Chris Conran	28	Salt Lake City, Utah	The Bachelorette – Clare	Week 2	Week 3 (Quit)
Alana Milne	27	Toronto, Ontario	The Bachelor – Matt	Week 3	Week 3 (Quit)
Alayah Benavidez	25	San Antonio, Texas	The Bachelor – Peter	Week 3	Week 3 (Note: Alayah was at the VIP party, but was never brought onto the beach.)
Chasen Nick	32	San Diego, California	The Bachelorette – Clare & Tayshia	Week 2	Week 2
Connor Brennan	29	Nashville, Tennessee	The Bachelorette – Katie	Week 1	Week 2
Karl Smith	34	Miami, Florida	The Bachelorette – Katie	Week 1	Week 2
Tahzjuan Hawkins	27	Castle Pines, Colorado	The Bachelor – Colton; Bachelor in Paradise – Season 6	Week 1	Week 2 (Quit)
Tré Cooper	26	Covington, Georgia	The Bachelorette – Katie	Week 1	Week 2 (Quit)
Kelsey Weier	30	Des Moines, Iowa	The Bachelor – Peter	Week 1	Week 1
Serena Chew	25	San Francisco, California	The Bachelor – Matt	Week 1	Week 1
Victoria Larson	28	Los Angeles, California	The Bachelor – Matt	Week 1	Week 1
Victoria Paul	28	Alexandria, Louisiana	The Bachelor – Peter	Week 1	Week 1 (Quit)

== Elimination table ==
Place	Contestant	Week					
Place	Contestant	1	2	3	4	5	6
1-6	Joe A.	In	Date	In	In	In	Engaged
1-6	Serena P.	In	Date	In	In	In	Engaged
1-6	Kenny	In	In	Date	Date	In	Engaged
1-6	Mari	In	In	In	Date	In	Engaged
1-6	Riley	Wait	Date	In	In	In	Engaged
1-6	Maurissa	In	Date	In	In	In	Engaged
7-14	Aaron	In	Last	Date	In	In	Split
7-14	Tia	Wait		Date	Date	In	Split
7-14	James	In	In	In	Last	Date	Split
7-14	Anna	Wait				Date	Split
7-14	Ed	Wait			Date	Date	Split
7-14	Mykenna	Wait				Date	Split
7-14	Thomas	Wait	Date	Date	In	In	Split
7-14	Becca	Wait	In	Date	In	In	Split
15-16	Chelsea	Wait		Last	Date	Out	
15-16	Natasha	In	In	In	Date	Out	
17-18	Noah	Date	In	In	In	Split	
17-18	Abigail	Date	In	In	In	Split	
19-21	Blake	Wait			Out		
19-21	Demar	Wait			Out		
19-21	Joe P.	Wait			Out		
22	Ivan	Date	In	In	Quit		
23	Kendall	Wait		In	Quit		
24-27	Deandra	In	Date	Out			
24-27	Demi	Last	In	Out			
24-27	Jessenia	Date	Date	Out			
24-27	Tammy	In	In	Out			
28-29	Brendan	Date	In	Quit			
28-29	Pieper	Wait		Quit			
30-31	Chris	Wait	Date	Quit			
30-31	Alana	Wait		Quit			
32	Alayah	Wait		Out			
33-35	Chasen	Wait	Out				
33-35	Connor	In	Out				
33-35	Karl	In	Out				
36	Tahzjuan	In	Quit				
37	Tré	In	Quit				
38-40	Kelsey	Out					
38-40	Serena C.	Out					
38-40	Victoria L.	Out					
41	Victoria P.	Quit					

=== Key ===
The contestant is male.
The contestant is female.
Date The contestant went on a date and gave out a rose at the rose ceremony.
Date The contestant went on a date and got a rose at the rose ceremony.
In The contestant gave or received a rose at the rose ceremony, thus remaining in the competition.
Last The contestant received the last rose.
Last The contestant went on a date and received the last rose.
Out The contestant went on a date and was eliminated.
Out The contestant was eliminated.
Quit The contestant had a date and voluntarily left the show.
Quit The contestant voluntarily left the show.
Split The couple broke up and were eliminated.
Stay The couple decided to stay together and won the competition.
Wait The contestant had to wait before appearing in paradise.
Split/Stay The couple split, but later got back together.
Quit The couple left together to pursue a relationship.

== Episodes ==
No. overall	No. in season	Title	Original release date	Prod. code	U.S. viewers (millions)	Rating/share (18–49)
64	1	"Week 1: Season Premiere"	August 16, 2021	701	3.23	0.9/7
Host: David Spade; Arrivals: Abigail, Joe A., Ivan, Serena P., Kelsey, Brendan, Natasha, Tammy, Jessenia, Tre, Aaron, Kenny, Noah, Connor, Deandra, Victoria L., Maurissa, Mari, Tahzjuan, James, Victoria P., Serena C., Karl. Date Card: Abigail; Abigail's Date: Noah; Arrival: Demi
65	2	"Week 2: Part 1"	August 23, 2021	702	3.41	1.0/5
Demi's Date: Brendan; Date Card: Jessenia; Jessenia's Date: Ivan; Departure:Victoria P. Rose Ceremony: Ivan gives his rose to Jessenia, Noah gives his rose to Abigail, Joe A. gives his rose to Serena P., Connor gives his rose to Maurissa, Tre gives his rose to Tahzjuan, Karl gives his rose to Deandra, Brendan gives his rose to Natasha, Aaron gives his rose to Tammy, Kenny gives his rose to Mari, James gives his rose to Demi. Kelsey, Serena C., and Victoria L. did not receive a rose and were eliminated.
66	3	"Week 2: Part 2"	August 24, 2021	703	2.78	0.8/4
New Host: Lance Bass; Arrival: Thomas; Thomas's Date: Serena P. Arrival: Riley; Riley's Date: Maurissa
67	4	"Week 3: Part 1"	August 30, 2021	704	3.39	0.9/7
Arrival: Chris, Chasen; Chasen & Chris's Date: Deandra, Jessenia; Date Card: Joe A. Joe A.'s Date: Serena P.
68	5	"Week 3: Part 2"	August 31, 2021	705	2.70	0.7/4
Departures: Tre, Tahzjuan; Arrival: Becca; Rose Ceremony: Natasha gives her rose to Brendan, Maurissa gives her rose to Riley, Serena P. gives her rose to Joe A., Abigail gives her rose to Noah, Jessenia gives her rose to Chris, Tammy gives her rose to Thomas, Demi gives her rose to Kenny, Mari gives her rose to James, Deandra gives her rose to Ivan, Becca gives her rose to Aaron. Chasen, Connor, and Karl did not receive a rose and were sent home. Arrival: Tia; Tia's Date: Kenny; Arrival: Kendall
69	6	"Week 4: Part 1"	September 6, 2021	706	3.12	0.8
Arrival: Pieper; Pieper's Date: Brendan
70	7	"Week 4: Part 2"	September 7, 2021	707	3.10	0.7
New Host: Tituss Burgess; VIP Party: Becca, Aaron, Noah, Abigail, Kenny, Jessenia, Chris, Riley, Deandra, James, Thomas, and Demi are invited to the party where the rest of the contestants will remain on the beach. Arrivals at the VIP Party: Alana, Alayah, Chelsea, Mykenna; Departures: Alayah and Mykenna; Arrival: Alana; Alana's Date: Chris; Arrival: Chelsea; Chelsea's Date: Aaron; Date Card: Becca; Becca's Date: Thomas; Departures: Chris & Alana break up and leave
71	8	"Week 5"	September 14, 2021	708	3.21	1.0
Departure: Brendan & Pieper leave as a couple Rose Ceremony: Wells gives Natasha an extra rose to give her an extra chance to find love after what happened with her and Brendan. Riley gives his rose to Maurissa, Joe A. gives his rose to Serena P., Ivan gives his rose to Kendall, Noah gives his rose to Abigail, Kenny gives his rose to Mari, James gives his rose to Tia, Thomas gives his rose to Becca, Aaron gives his rose to Chelsea. Deandra, Demi, Jessenia and Tammy do not receive a rose and are sent home. New Host: Lil Jon; Arrival: Blake; Blake's Date: Tia; Arrival: Joe P. Joe P.'s Date: Natasha
72	9	"Week 6"	September 21, 2021	709	3.18	0.9
Departure: Kendall; Arrivals: Demar, Ed; Demar and Ed's Date: Chelsea, Natasha; Date Card: Kenny & Mari; Separation: The contestants have to split up and be separated at a hotel due to a tropical storm coming to hit the beach soon. Everyone returned to the beach the next day.
73	10	"Week 7"	September 28, 2021	710	2.82	0.7
Departure: Ivan quits after making the mistake of hooking up with Alexa from Peter's season at the hotel during the separation. Rose Ceremony: Serena P. gives her rose to Joe A., Abigail gives her rose to Noah, Maurissa gives her rose to Riley, Mari gives her rose to Kenny, Becca gives her rose to Thomas, Chelsea gives her rose to Aaron, Natasha gives her rose to Ed, Tia gives her rose to James. Blake, Demar, and Joe P. did not receive a rose and were sent home. Arrival: Anna; Anna's Date: James; Arrival: Mykenna returns on the beach Mykenna's Date: Ed
74	11	"Week 8: Season Finale"	October 5, 2021	711	2.91	0.7
Departure: Noah & Abigal break up Rose Ceremony: Joe A. gives his rose to Serena P., Riley gives his rose to Maurissa, Kenny gives his rose to Mari, Thomas gives his rose to Becca, James gives his rose to Anna, Aaron gives his rose to Tia, Ed gives his rose to Mykenna. Chelsea and Natasha did not receive a rose and were sent home. Dean & Caelynn arrive to tell the couples to have the talk about what they want after Paradise. Departures: Becca & Thomas break up. Ed & Mykenna break up. James & Anna break up. Aaron & Tia break up. Commitment Ceremony #1: Kenny proposes to Mari they get engaged Commitment Ceremony #2: Riley proposes to Maurissa they get engaged Commitment Ceremony #3: Kendall comes back to the beach to talk to Joe A. again to share she's happy for him. Serena P. comes down and he tells her about Kendall. He proposed to her and they get engaged Montage: Instead of a reunion, a montage is filmed showing what different contestants are doing after Paradise. James & Aaron are roommates, and both Noah & Abigail and Becca & Thomas have gotten back together and are happy and in love. Brendan & Pieper are still together but keeping out of the spotlight after everything that happened with Natasha. They also shared that Natasha has gained thousand of Instagram followers, throwing shade at Brendan & Pieper for wanting followers from the show. All three couples who got engaged are still together.
