= Uzoma Nwachukwu =

American football player (born 1990)

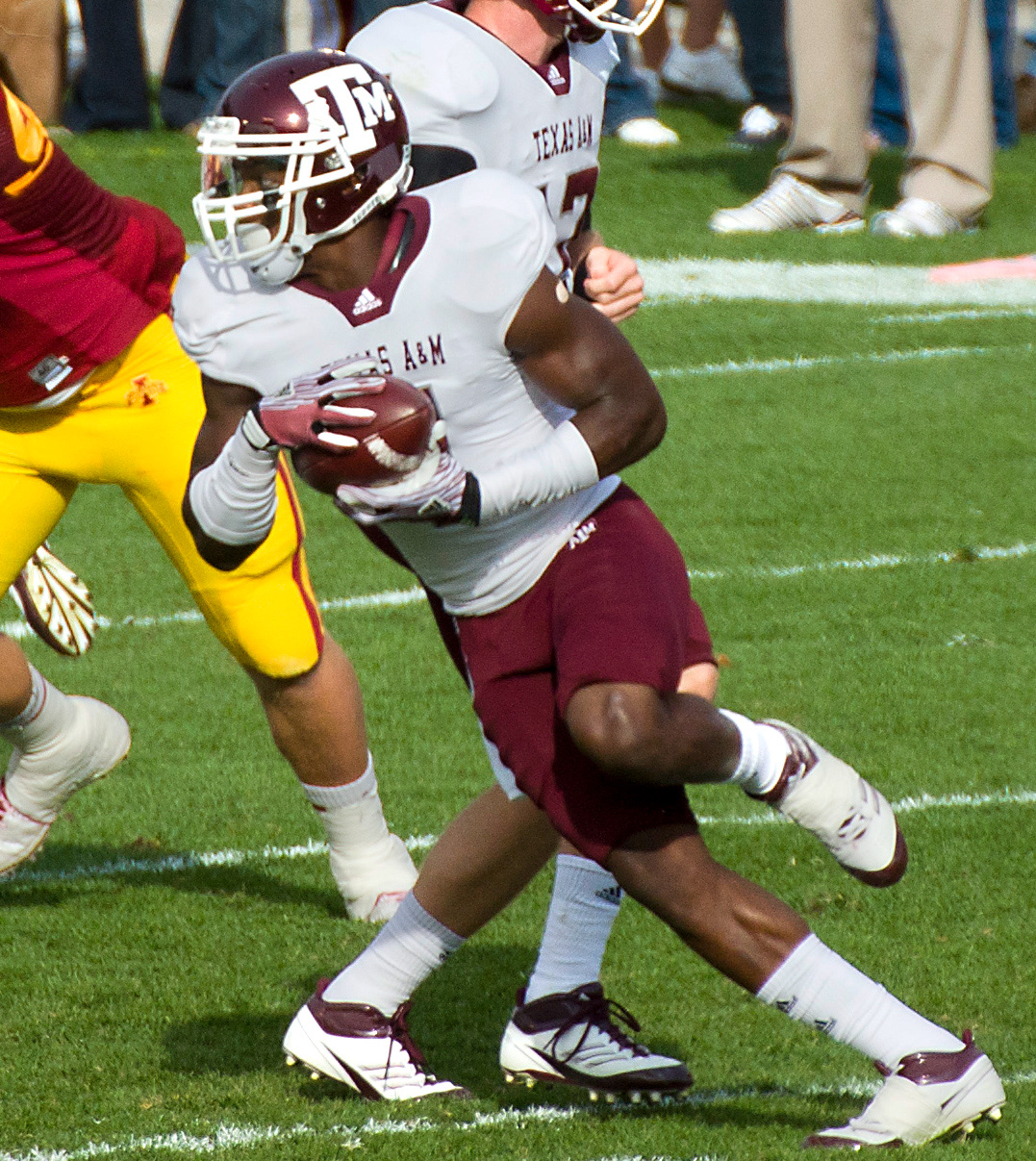
- Nwachukwu in 2011

No. 16, 17
- Position: Wide receiver

Personal information
- Born: December 15, 1990 (age 35); Allen, Texas, U.S.
- Listed height: 6 ft 0 in (1.83 m)
- Listed weight: 194 lb (88 kg)

Career information
- High school: Allen (Allen, Texas)
- College: Texas A&M
- NFL draft: 2013: undrafted

Career history
- Houston Texans (2013–2015)*; Miami Dolphins (2015)*; BC Lions (2016)*; Seattle Seahawks (2016)*; Dallas Cowboys (2017)*
- * Offseason or practice squad member only

Awards and highlights
- ESPN Big 12 All-Freshman (2009)
- Stats at Pro Football Reference

Uzoma "E.Z." Nwachukwu // (born December 15, 1990) is an American former football wide receiver, sports marketing agent, and television personality. He played college football for Texas A&M. He was a member of the Houston Texans, Miami Dolphins, Seattle Seahawks, and Dallas Cowboys of the National Football League (NFL), and BC Lions of the Canadian Football League (CFL).

== College career ==
Nwachukwu chose the Aggies over Oklahoma, Missouri, Notre Dame, Nebraska, and Louisville. He made an instant impact, starting as a true freshman. In 2009, he led the Aggies' wideouts with 708 yards on 40 catches, and ranked second in touchdown catches with six. He had three 100-yard receiving games on the year, which tied a freshman school record. In 2010, Nwachukwu was on the preseason watch list for the Biletnikoff Award. He finished his time at A&M as one of just four Aggies with more than 120 catches, 1,500 yards, and 10 touchdowns in his career. In total he had 152 catches for 2239 yards and 19 touchdowns. He also had 14 rushing attempts for 131 yards and 1 touchdown.

== Professional career ==
=== Houston Texans ===
Nwachukwu signed with the Houston Texans as an undrafted free agent after the 2013 NFL draft on May 10, 2013. He was waived during final roster cuts on August 31, 2013, and signed to the team's practice squad two days later.

After spending the entire 2013 NFL season on the practice squad, Nwachukwu signed a reserve/futures contract with the team on December 31, 2013. He was waived during final roster cuts again on August 30, 2014, and signed to the team's practice squad again the next day. He was placed on the practice squad/injured list on September 30, 2014. He was released with an injury settlement on October 3, and re-signed to the practice squad on December 15, 2014.

Nwachukwu spent the rest of the 2014 NFL season on the practice squad, and he signed a reserve/futures contract with the team again on December 30, 2014. After being featured on the 10th season of HBO's NFL training camp documentary series Hard Knocks, he was waived during final roster cuts on September 5, 2015.

=== Later career ===
Nwachukwu reunited with Texas A&M teammate Ryan Tannehill when he was signed to the Miami Dolphins' practice squad on September 7, 2015. On September 15, 2015, Nwachukwu was released by the Dolphins.

Nwachukwu signed a contract with the BC Lions of the Canadian Football League on March 8, 2016. He was released by the team before the start of the season on June 12, 2016. He was signed to the Seattle Seahawks' 90-man offseason roster on August 6, 2016, and was waived during final roster cuts on September 3, 2016.

On January 31, 2017, Nwachukwu signed a reserve/future contract with the Dallas Cowboys. He was waived during final roster cuts on September 2, 2017.

== Personal life ==
=== The Bachelorette ===
In July 2020, it was announced that Nwachukwu would appear as a contestant on the 16th season of The Bachelorette featuring Clare Crawley. Crawley chose Dale Moss as the winner, and she was replaced by Tayshia Adams as the new lead of the show after four episodes. Adams eliminated Nwachukwu in the eighth episode of the season.

Following his appearance on The Bachelorette, a woman told HuffPost that Nwachukwu sexually assaulted her at a party 10 years ago when she was an 18-year-old high school student and he was a sophomore in college.
