= Jason Foster =

American football player (born 1988)

No. 66, 62, 68
- Position: Center

Personal information
- Born: October 21, 1988 (age 38); Long Island, New York, U.S.
- Listed height: 6 ft 4 in (1.93 m)
- Listed weight: 225 lb (102 kg)

Career information
- College: Rhode Island
- NFL draft: 2012: undrafted

Career history
- Indianapolis Colts (2012)*; Sacramento Mountain Lions (2012); Oakland Raiders (2012–2013)*; Tampa Bay Buccaneers (2013–2014)*; BC Lions (2015)
- * Offseason or practice squad member only

Awards and highlights
- Second-team All-CAA (2011); Third-team All-CAA (2010)
- Stats at Pro Football Reference
- Stats at CFL.ca (archive)

Jason Foster (born October 21, 1988) is an American former gridiron football offensive lineman and television personality. He was a member of the Indianapolis Colts, Oakland Raiders, and Tampa Bay Buccaneers of the National Football League (NFL), and played for the Sacramento Mountain Lions of the United Football League (UFL) and BC Lions of the Canadian Football League (CFL).

== Early life ==
Foster was born on Long Island in New York, and moved to Vermont at age 5. He attended college at the University of Rhode Island, where he played college football. He earned third-team All-Colonial Athletic Association (CAA) honors in 2010 as a junior, and second-team All-CAA honors as a senior in 2011.

== Professional career ==
Foster signed with the Indianapolis Colts as an undrafted free agent following the 2012 NFL draft on May 1, 2012. He was waived near the end of the preseason on August 26, 2012. He played for the Sacramento Mountain Lions of the UFL before the league shut down on October 20, 2012.

Foster signed to the Oakland Raiders' practice squad on October 31, 2012. He spent the remainder of the 2012 NFL season on the Raiders' practice squad and signed a reserve/futures contract with the team on January 2, 2013. He was waived at the end of the preseason during final roster cuts on August 31, 2013. He re-signed to the team's practice squad on October 21, and was released on November 12, 2013.

Foster signed with the Tampa Bay Buccaneers' practice squad on December 26, 2013. He spent the rest of the 2013 NFL season on the practice squad, and signed a reserve/futures contract with the team on January 6, 2014. The Buccaneers waived Foster during roster cuts on August 24, 2014.

Foster signed with the CFL's BC Lions on May 26, 2015. He played in 18 games for the team in 2015, and was released on February 16, 2016.

== The Bachelorette ==
Foster was one of the 31 contestants on season 16 of the ABC dating competition The Bachelorette, starring Clare Crawley, and the season premiered on October 13, 2020. He was described by the show as living in Arlington, Virginia, and a "former NFL offensive lineman who, after suffering too many concussions on the field, decided to prioritize his health and change the direction of his life. Since leaving the NFL in 2016, he has lost 120 pounds and started a career in IT staffing and solutions." Crawley chose Dale Moss as the winner, and she was replaced by Tayshia Adams as the new lead of the show after four episodes. Foster left the show in the fifth episode after realizing he still had romantic feelings for Crawley.
