= Rizzuto =

Rizzuto (Italian: [ritˈtsuːto]) is Italian surname from Calabria and Sicily, originally indicating a curly-haired person. Notable people with the surname include:

- Angelo Rizzuto (1906–1967), American photographer
- Calogero Rizzuto (born 1992), German footballer
- Calogero Rizzuto (architect) (1955–2020), Italian architect
- Garth Rizzuto (born 1947), Canadian ice hockey player
- Leandro Rizzuto (1938–2017), American businessman
- Leandro Rizzuto Jr. (born 1962), American businessman
- Nick Rizzuto, American radio producer
- Paul Rizzuto (born 1936), Australian fencer
- Phil Rizzuto (1917–2007), American baseball player and sports announcer
- Pietro Rizzuto (1934–1997), Italian-Canadian politician
- Rizzuto crime family, an Italian-Canadian crime family
  - Nicolo Rizzuto (1924–2010), Italian-Canadian mobster
  - Vito Rizzuto (1946–2013), Italian-Canadian mobster

== See also ==
- Capo Rizzuto, a town in Calabria
- Rizzotto
- Rizzuti
