= Jeff Arcuri =

American stand-up comedian (born 1987)

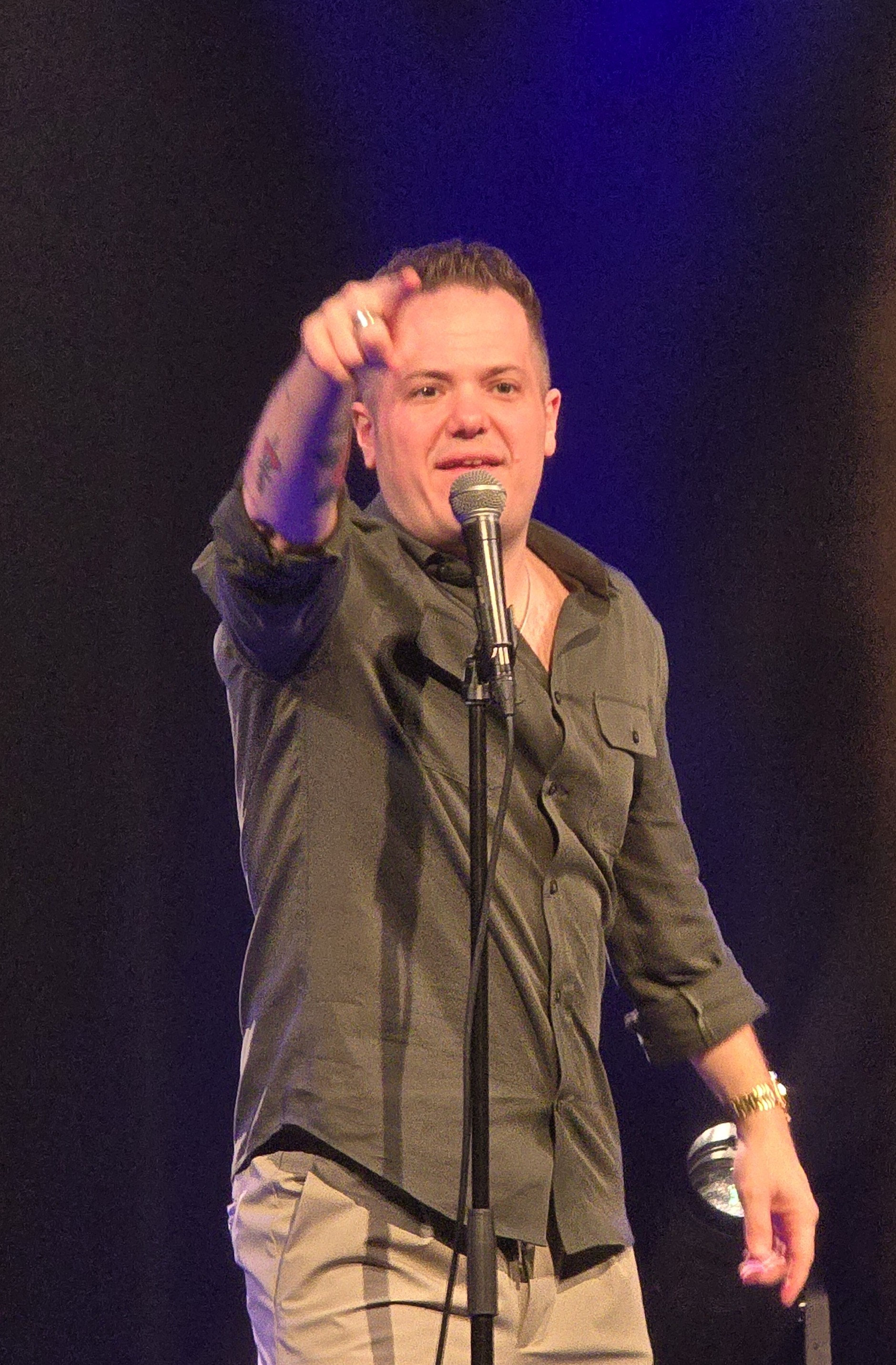
- Jeff Arcuri at Alhambra (Paris) in May 2025
- Born: October 2, 1987 (age 39)
- Spouse: Katie Thurston (m. 2025)

Comedy career
- Years active: 2010s–present
- Medium: Stand-up
- Website: www.jeffarcuri.com

Jeff Arcuri (born October 2, 1987) is an American stand-up comedian known for his crowd work. His stand-up special, Nice to Meet You, was released on Netflix in July 2026.

== Background ==
Arcuri is from Monroe, Michigan. He is of Italian descent.

== Career ==
Arcuri has performed on the Late Show with Stephen Colbert, and Jeff Ross Presents Roast Battle. He has been a regular performer at the Comedy Cellar. In 2025, he embarked on his Unscripted world tour of over 50 dates, following his "The Full Beans Fall Tour" in late 2024. On July 7 2026, Arcuri's debut stand-up special, Nice to Meet You, was released on Netflix.

A 2014 review by Jason Heidemann in The Chicago Tribune described Arcuri as "a joke machine".

== Personal life ==
Arcuri married The Bachelorette star Katie Thurston in March 2025. The ceremony was moved up to facilitate Thurston's treatment for breast cancer.
