= The Bachelorette (American TV series) season 16 =

16th season of television series

The Bachelorette
- Season 16
- Promotional poster featuring Tayshia Adams
- Starring: Clare Crawley; Tayshia Adams
- Presented by: Chris Harrison; JoJo Fletcher
- No. of contestants: 35
- Winners: Dale Moss; Zac Clark
- Runner-up: Ben Smith
- No. of episodes: 12

Release
- Original network: ABC
- Original release: October 13 – December 22, 2020

Additional information
- Filming dates: July 18 – September 1, 2020

Season chronology
- ← Previous; Season 15 Next → Season 17

The sixteenth season of The Bachelorette premiered on October 13, 2020. It features Clare Crawley, a 39-year-old hairstylist from Sacramento, California, and Tayshia Adams, a 29-year-old phlebotomist from Corona del Mar, California.

The season was originally set to premiere on May 18, 2020, however the COVID-19 pandemic forced production to postpone indefinitely. The season also aired on Tuesday nights instead of its regular Monday night timeslot.

Crawley was the runner-up on the 18th season of The Bachelor featuring Juan Pablo Galavis. She also made appearances on seasons one and two of Bachelor in Paradise, and on Bachelor Winter Games. At 39, Crawley is the oldest Bachelorette in the show's history; the previous oldest Bachelorette was Rachel Lindsay, who was 32 on her season. Due to the pandemic, the entire season was filmed at La Quinta Resort & Club in La Quinta, California. Crawley departed the show in episode 4 after choosing 31-year-old Dale Moss as her fiancé. Moss became the first African American winner in the franchise's history. The couple broke up on January 19, 2021. They got back together soon after, but broke up for good on September 27, 2021.

Adams finished in third place on the 23rd season of The Bachelor featuring Colton Underwood. She also made an appearance on season 6 of Bachelor in Paradise. The season concluded on December 22, 2020, with Adams accepting a proposal from 36-year-old addiction specialist Zac Clark. They ended their engagement on November 22, 2021.

== Production ==
The original promotional poster of the season featuring Clare Crawley

=== Casting and contestants ===
Clare Crawley was named as the Bachelorette on Good Morning America on March 2, 2020. Some of the other women who were considered for the role include season 22's Tia Booth and Kendall Long, season 23's Tayshia Adams and Katie Morton, previous Bachelorette Hannah Brown, and season 24's Kelsey Weier. Adams would eventually take the role after Crawley's dismissal from the show (see below).

Notable contestants for this season include football players Dale Moss, Jason Foster and Uzoma Nwachukwu; and Tyler Smith, who is the brother of country music singer Granger Smith.

=== Filming and development ===
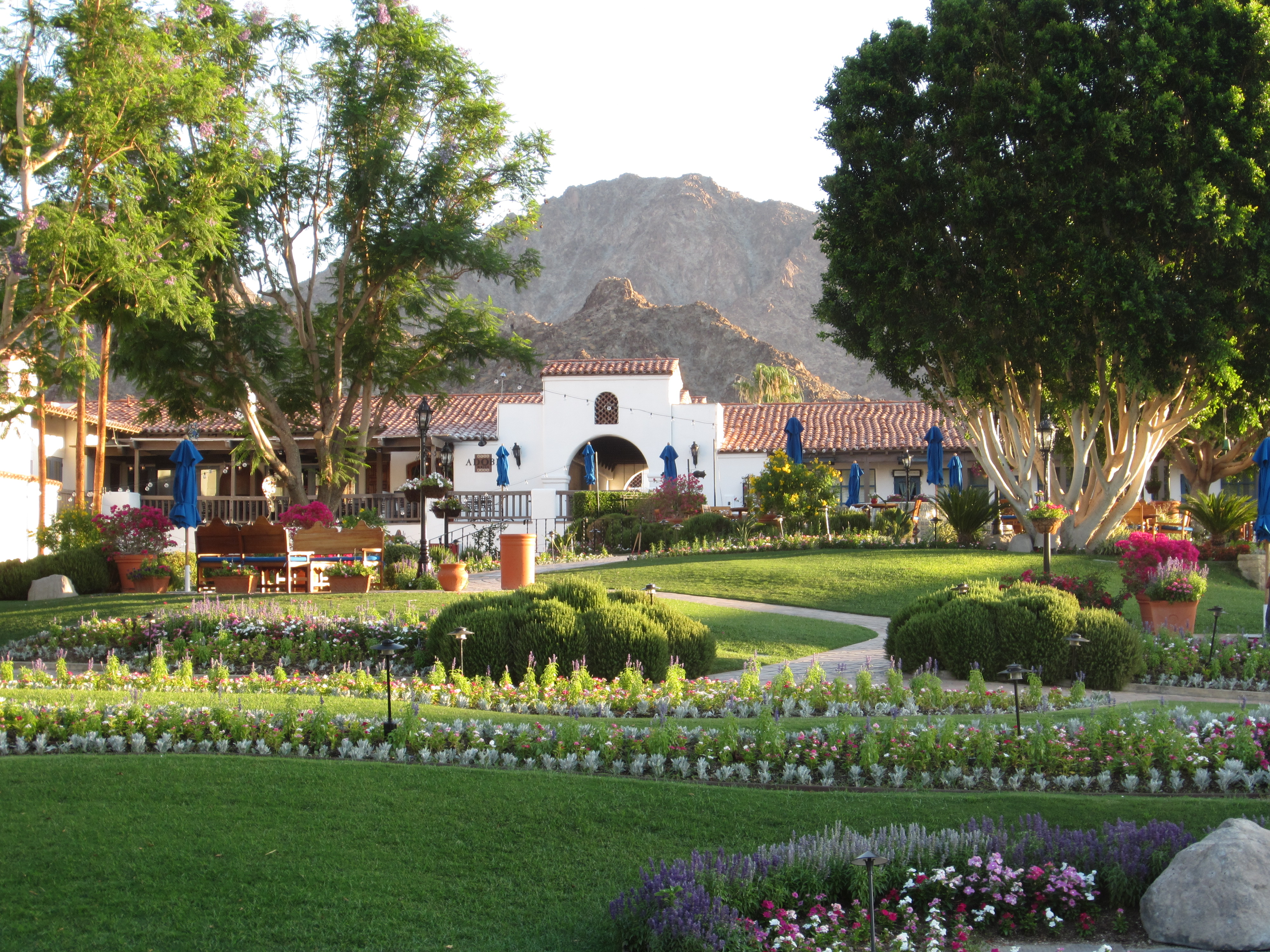
Due to the COVID-19 pandemic, the contestants were housed and isolated at La Quinta Resort & Club in La Quinta, California for the entire season.

For the first time since the second season of The Bachelorette in 2004, the dates and travel would have to take place entirely within the United States because of growing concerns about the COVID-19 due to the ongoing pandemic. Filming was scheduled to begin on March 13, 2020, at the traditional Villa de La Vina mansion in Agoura Hills, California and had been planned to conclude in mid-May in time for the original premiere date of May 18, but with the aforementioned pandemic growing rapidly, the season was forced to suspend production and filming was postponed to a later date. The initial destinations for the season including visits to Chattanooga (Tennessee), Reykjavík (Iceland), Rome (Italy) and Hvar (Croatia), but were called off by the production crew due to factors of the worsening outbreak, omitting international travel. Iceland and Croatia would eventually be revisited in the twenty-sixth season of The Bachelor.

On June 17, 2020, it was announced that the season was scheduled to premiere in fall 2020 as COVID viral transmission cases had gradually started to decline. The following day, it was announced that production was rescheduled to July, with the show becoming the first non-scripted American television program to begin production since the start of the pandemic. Production decided to change into an alternative single location to a lockdown-styled theme at La Quinta Resort & Club in La Quinta, California, a format which is similar to Big Brother franchise. It began in early July where contestants and crew being isolated with a two-week quarantine period before filming and regular COVID-19 testing is required to have their temperature checked, being resulted all of the contestants and crew were tested negative. Contestants were to have tested positive from COVID-19 that is either a subject of not being permitted on the show or having to wait an indefinite delay to join the cast. Due to enforced quarantine restrictions, all of the dates would be taking place entirely at the resort limits to reduce public interactions. This was for the first time since season eight being not filmed at Villa de La Vina mansion normally in the first few weeks of the competition. On August 27, the season announced to premiere on October 13, marking the first season that did not premiere in the usual May start since the series returned in 2008, and the first time in the franchise since the 2007–08 television season to air in the fall.

Due to the concerns surrounding in the current pandemic, the typical Men Tell All conducted in a remote format with Harrison hosting from Nemacolin Woodlands Resort in Farmington, Pennsylvania via video chatting and the eliminated contestants had invited at a secluded private house in La Quinta Resort, the typical After the Final Rose special did not take place.

=== Lead replacement ===
Crawley left the show in the fourth episode after she became engaged to Dale Moss. Tayshia Adams replaced Crawley as the Bachelorette, and the season proceeded. Given the unique parameters of this season due to the pandemic, Adams' season did not "restart" upon her arrival. Rather, all of the remaining contestants continued from this season plus an additional four men stayed to win over Adams' heart.

== Contestants ==
32 original potential contestants were revealed on March 11, 2020. Host Chris Harrison later revealed that they would likely be recasting the season due to the filming delay.

An updated cast list containing 42 potential contestants was released on July 15, 2020, including 17 from the original potential cast list of March 2020.

Four of the intended 32 original contestants were recast. Matt James was instead recast as the lead for season 25 of The Bachelor – becoming the first male African American lead and the second African American in the history of the franchise, following Rachel Lindsay from season 13 of The Bachelorette before Adams was named as the Bachelorette. Greg Grippo and Karl Smith were recast for the following season the following year, and James Clarke was recast for season 19 instead two years later.

The final cast list of 31 men was announced on September 29, 2020. Four new contestants arrived in the fifth episode when Adams became the Bachelorette, bringing a total number of contestants to 35.

Name	Age	Hometown	Occupation	Arrived	Outcome	Place	Ref
Dale Moss	31	Brandon, South Dakota	Former Pro Football Wide Receiver	Week 1	Clare's Winner	1	
Zac Clark	36	Haddonfield, New Jersey	Addiction Specialist	Week 1	Tayshia's Winner	1	
Ben Smith	30	Noblesville, Indiana	Army Ranger	Week 1	Tayshia's Runner-Up	2	
Ivan Hall	28	Plano, Texas	Aeronautical Engineer	Week 1	Week 9	3	
Brendan Morais	30	Milford, Massachusetts	Commercial Roofer	Week 1	Week 9	4 (quit)	
Ben Smith	(Returned to competition)				Week 8	(Note: Smith was originally eliminated in Week 8, finished in fourth place, but he returned to the competition after the conclusion of Overnight Dates at the end of Week 9 and eventually finished as Tayshia's runner-up.)	
Bennett Jordan	36	Atlanta, Georgia	Wealth Management Consultant	Week 1	Week 7	5–6	
Noah Erb	25	Tulsa, Oklahoma	Registered Travel Nurse	Week 3	Week 7	5–6	
Riley Christian	30	Long Island City, New York	Attorney	Week 1	Week 7	7	
Blake Moynes	29	Hamilton, Ontario	Wildlife Manager	Week 1	Week 7	8	
Demar Jackson	26	Scottsdale, Arizona	Spin Cycling Instructor	Week 1	Week 6	9–11	
Ed Waisbrot	36	Pittsburgh, Pennsylvania	Health Care Salesman	Week 1	Week 6	9–11	
Spencer Robertson	30	La Jolla, California	Water Treatment Engineer	Week 3	Week 6	9–11	
Bennett Jordan	(Returned to competition)				Week 6		
Uzoma "Eazy" Nwachukwu	29	Allen, Texas	Sports Marketing Agent	Week 1	Week 6	12	
Chasen Nick	32	Walnut Creek, California	IT Account Executive	Week 1	Week 5	13–16	
Joe Park	36	North Woodmere, New York	Anesthesiologist	Week 1	Week 5	13–16	
Jordan Chapman	26	Southington, Connecticut	Software Account Executive	Week 1	Week 5	13–16	
Kenny Braasch	39	Oak Lawn, Illinois	Boy Band Manager	Week 1	Week 5	13–16	
Jay Smith	29	Langhorne, Pennsylvania	Fitness Director	Week 1	Week 4	17–19	
Montel Hill	30	Hingham, Massachusetts	Gym Owner	Week 3	Week 4	17–19	
Peter Giannikopoulos	32	Framingham, Massachusetts	Real Estate Agent	Week 3	Week 4	17–19	
Jason Foster	31	Rutland, Vermont	Former Pro Footballer Lineman	Week 1	Week 4	20 (quit)	
Zach Jackson	37	St. George, Utah	Cleaning Service Owner	Week 1	Week 3	21	
Blake Monar	31	Rockport, Indiana	Male Grooming Specialist	Week 1	Week 2	22–24	
Garin Flowers	34	Fort Lauderdale, Florida	Professor of Journalism	Week 1	Week 2	22–24	
Tyler Smith	36	Georgetown, Texas	Music Manager	Week 1	Week 2	22–24	
Yosef Aborady	30	Daphne, Alabama	Medical Device Salesman	Week 1	Week 2	25	
Brandon Goss	28	Cleveland, Ohio	Real Estate Agent	Week 1	Week 2	26	
AJ Yalawan	28	Irvine, California	Software Salesman	Week 1	Week 1	27–34	
Chris Conran	27	Salt Lake City, Utah	Landscape Design Salesman	Week 1	Week 1	27–34	
Jeremy Higgins	40	Virginia Beach, Virginia	Banker	Week 1	Week 1	27–34	
Jordan Manier	30	Dearborn, Michigan	Cyber Security Engineer	Week 1	Week 1	27–34	
Mike Tobin	38	Calgary, Alberta	Digital Media Adviser	Week 1	Week 1	27–34	
Page Pressley	37	Santa Fe, New Mexico	Chef	Week 1	Week 1	27–34	
Robby Stahl	31	St. Pete Beach, Florida	Insurance Broker	Week 1	Week 1	27–34	
Tyler Cottrill	27	Gassaway, West Virginia	Lawyer	Week 1	Week 1	27–34	

=== Future appearances ===
==== The Bachelorette ====
Adams was named as the interim host for The Bachelorette for seasons 17 and 18 alongside season 11 lead Kaitlyn Bristowe, replacing Chris Harrison. Blake Moynes returned for season 17 of The Bachelorette, where he got engaged to Katie Thurston.

==== Bachelor in Paradise ====
Season 7

Brendan Morais, Ivan Hall, Kenny Braasch, Noah Erb, Riley Christian, Chasen Nick, Chris Conran, Blake Monar, Joe Park, Demar Jackson, and Ed Waisbrot returned for season 7 of Bachelor in Paradise. Nick was eliminated in week 2. Conran and Morais quit in week 3. Hall quit in week 4. Monar, Park, and Jackson were eliminated in week 4. Erb split from Abigail Heringer in week 5, although they later got back together. Waisbrot split from Mykenna Dorn in week 6. Braasch and Christian both got engaged in week 6 to Mari Pepin and Maurissa Gunn, respectively.

Season 9

Moynes returned for season 9 of Bachelor in Paradise. He quit in week 4.

Season 10

Dale Moss returned for season 10 of Bachelor in Paradise. He was eliminated and left in a relationship with Kat Izzo in the finale.

==== The Goat ====
Adams appeared on the first season of The Goat.

==== Got To Get Out ====
Crawley appeared on the first season of the Hulu show Got to Get Out.

== Call-out order ==
Order	Bachelors	Bachelorette Clare			Bachelorette Tayshia							
Order	Bachelors	Week										
Order	Bachelors	1	2	3 (Note: Episode 3 ended in a cliffhanger and rose ceremony was not held. In episode 4, Clare became engaged to Dale, and she decided to say goodbye all of the remaining guys.) (Note: In Episode 5, Tayshia Adams came in as a replacement for Clare. The remaining men all decided to stay for Tayshia, four new contestants were also introduced. Later in the episode, Tayshia gave her first impression rose to Spencer, but canceled her first rose ceremony, therefore the remaining men are listed in alphabetical order.)		4	5	6	7	8	9	10
1	Ben	Dale	Riley	Dale	Spencer	Eazy	Noah	Zac C.	Ben	Ivan	Zac C.	Zac C.
2	Riley	Blake Moynes	Jason	Ben; Bennett; Blake Moynes; Brendan; Chasen; Demar; Eazy; Ed; Ivan; Jason; Jay; Joe; Jordan C. Kenny; Riley; Zac C.	Ben; Bennett; Blake Moynes; Brendan; Chasen; Demar; Eazy; Ed; Ivan; Jason; Jay; Joe; Jordan C. Kenny; Montel; Noah; Peter; Riley; Zac C.	Brendan	Ivan	Ben	Zac C.	Zac C.	Ben	Ben
3	Zac C.	Eazy	Chasen	Ben; Bennett; Blake Moynes; Brendan; Chasen; Demar; Eazy; Ed; Ivan; Jason; Jay; Joe; Jordan C. Kenny; Riley; Zac C.	Ben; Bennett; Blake Moynes; Brendan; Chasen; Demar; Eazy; Ed; Ivan; Jason; Jay; Joe; Jordan C. Kenny; Montel; Noah; Peter; Riley; Zac C.	Ivan	Zac C.	Brendan	Ivan	Brendan	Ivan	
4	Jordan M.	Ben	Blake Moynes	Ben; Bennett; Blake Moynes; Brendan; Chasen; Demar; Eazy; Ed; Ivan; Jason; Jay; Joe; Jordan C. Kenny; Riley; Zac C.	Ben; Bennett; Blake Moynes; Brendan; Chasen; Demar; Eazy; Ed; Ivan; Jason; Jay; Joe; Jordan C. Kenny; Montel; Noah; Peter; Riley; Zac C.	Zac C.	Ben	Riley	Brendan	Ben	Brendan	
5	Jason	Riley	Dale	Ben; Bennett; Blake Moynes; Brendan; Chasen; Demar; Eazy; Ed; Ivan; Jason; Jay; Joe; Jordan C. Kenny; Riley; Zac C.	Ben; Bennett; Blake Moynes; Brendan; Chasen; Demar; Eazy; Ed; Ivan; Jason; Jay; Joe; Jordan C. Kenny; Montel; Noah; Peter; Riley; Zac C.	Riley	Eazy	Blake Moynes	Bennett (Note: Bennett was brought back to the competition on Week 7.); Noah			
6	Ivan	Zach J.	Zac C.	Ben; Bennett; Blake Moynes; Brendan; Chasen; Demar; Eazy; Ed; Ivan; Jason; Jay; Joe; Jordan C. Kenny; Riley; Zac C.	Ben; Bennett; Blake Moynes; Brendan; Chasen; Demar; Eazy; Ed; Ivan; Jason; Jay; Joe; Jordan C. Kenny; Montel; Noah; Peter; Riley; Zac C.	Kenny	Riley	Ivan	Bennett; Noah			
7	Kenny	Tyler S.	Demar	Ben; Bennett; Blake Moynes; Brendan; Chasen; Demar; Eazy; Ed; Ivan; Jason; Jay; Joe; Jordan C. Kenny; Riley; Zac C.	Ben; Bennett; Blake Moynes; Brendan; Chasen; Demar; Eazy; Ed; Ivan; Jason; Jay; Joe; Jordan C. Kenny; Montel; Noah; Peter; Riley; Zac C.	Ben	Brendan	Noah	Riley			
8	Brendan	Joe	Brendan	Ben; Bennett; Blake Moynes; Brendan; Chasen; Demar; Eazy; Ed; Ivan; Jason; Jay; Joe; Jordan C. Kenny; Riley; Zac C.	Ben; Bennett; Blake Moynes; Brendan; Chasen; Demar; Eazy; Ed; Ivan; Jason; Jay; Joe; Jordan C. Kenny; Montel; Noah; Peter; Riley; Zac C.	Demar	Bennett	Demar; Ed; Spencer	Blake Moynes			
9	Mike	Jason	Jordan C.	Ben; Bennett; Blake Moynes; Brendan; Chasen; Demar; Eazy; Ed; Ivan; Jason; Jay; Joe; Jordan C. Kenny; Riley; Zac C.	Ben; Bennett; Blake Moynes; Brendan; Chasen; Demar; Eazy; Ed; Ivan; Jason; Jay; Joe; Jordan C. Kenny; Montel; Noah; Peter; Riley; Zac C.	Bennett	Blake Moynes	Demar; Ed; Spencer				
10	Jeremy	Demar	Joe	Ben; Bennett; Blake Moynes; Brendan; Chasen; Demar; Eazy; Ed; Ivan; Jason; Jay; Joe; Jordan C. Kenny; Riley; Zac C.	Ben; Bennett; Blake Moynes; Brendan; Chasen; Demar; Eazy; Ed; Ivan; Jason; Jay; Joe; Jordan C. Kenny; Montel; Noah; Peter; Riley; Zac C.	Spencer	Demar	Demar; Ed; Spencer				
11	Blake Monar	Chasen	Jay	Ben; Bennett; Blake Moynes; Brendan; Chasen; Demar; Eazy; Ed; Ivan; Jason; Jay; Joe; Jordan C. Kenny; Riley; Zac C.	Ben; Bennett; Blake Moynes; Brendan; Chasen; Demar; Eazy; Ed; Ivan; Jason; Jay; Joe; Jordan C. Kenny; Montel; Noah; Peter; Riley; Zac C.	Jordan C.	Spencer	Bennett				
12	Tyler C.	Jordan C.	Bennett	Ben; Bennett; Blake Moynes; Brendan; Chasen; Demar; Eazy; Ed; Ivan; Jason; Jay; Joe; Jordan C. Kenny; Riley; Zac C.	Ben; Bennett; Blake Moynes; Brendan; Chasen; Demar; Eazy; Ed; Ivan; Jason; Jay; Joe; Jordan C. Kenny; Montel; Noah; Peter; Riley; Zac C.	Noah	Ed	Eazy				
13	Bennett	Blake Monar	Eazy	Ben; Bennett; Blake Moynes; Brendan; Chasen; Demar; Eazy; Ed; Ivan; Jason; Jay; Joe; Jordan C. Kenny; Riley; Zac C.	Ben; Bennett; Blake Moynes; Brendan; Chasen; Demar; Eazy; Ed; Ivan; Jason; Jay; Joe; Jordan C. Kenny; Montel; Noah; Peter; Riley; Zac C.	Joe	Chasen; Joe; Jordan C. Kenny					
14	Blake Moynes	Kenny	Ben	Ben; Bennett; Blake Moynes; Brendan; Chasen; Demar; Eazy; Ed; Ivan; Jason; Jay; Joe; Jordan C. Kenny; Riley; Zac C.	Ben; Bennett; Blake Moynes; Brendan; Chasen; Demar; Eazy; Ed; Ivan; Jason; Jay; Joe; Jordan C. Kenny; Montel; Noah; Peter; Riley; Zac C.	Blake Moynes	Chasen; Joe; Jordan C. Kenny					
15	Chris	Brendan	Ed	Ben; Bennett; Blake Moynes; Brendan; Chasen; Demar; Eazy; Ed; Ivan; Jason; Jay; Joe; Jordan C. Kenny; Riley; Zac C.	Ben; Bennett; Blake Moynes; Brendan; Chasen; Demar; Eazy; Ed; Ivan; Jason; Jay; Joe; Jordan C. Kenny; Montel; Noah; Peter; Riley; Zac C.	Ed	Chasen; Joe; Jordan C. Kenny					
16	AJ	Garin	Ivan	Ben; Bennett; Blake Moynes; Brendan; Chasen; Demar; Eazy; Ed; Ivan; Jason; Jay; Joe; Jordan C. Kenny; Riley; Zac C.	Ben; Bennett; Blake Moynes; Brendan; Chasen; Demar; Eazy; Ed; Ivan; Jason; Jay; Joe; Jordan C. Kenny; Montel; Noah; Peter; Riley; Zac C.	Chasen	Chasen; Joe; Jordan C. Kenny					
17	Joe	Ed	Kenny	Ben; Bennett; Blake Moynes; Brendan; Chasen; Demar; Eazy; Ed; Ivan; Jason; Jay; Joe; Jordan C. Kenny; Riley; Zac C.	Ben; Bennett; Blake Moynes; Brendan; Chasen; Demar; Eazy; Ed; Ivan; Jason; Jay; Joe; Jordan C. Kenny; Montel; Noah; Peter; Riley; Zac C.	Jay; Montel; Peter						
18	Garin	Bennett	Zach J.	Zach J.	Ben; Bennett; Blake Moynes; Brendan; Chasen; Demar; Eazy; Ed; Ivan; Jason; Jay; Joe; Jordan C. Kenny; Montel; Noah; Peter; Riley; Zac C.	Jay; Montel; Peter						
19	Robby	Zac C.	Blake Monar; Garin; Tyler S.		Ben; Bennett; Blake Moynes; Brendan; Chasen; Demar; Eazy; Ed; Ivan; Jason; Jay; Joe; Jordan C. Kenny; Montel; Noah; Peter; Riley; Zac C.	Jay; Montel; Peter						
20	Eazy	Jay	Blake Monar; Garin; Tyler S.		Ben; Bennett; Blake Moynes; Brendan; Chasen; Demar; Eazy; Ed; Ivan; Jason; Jay; Joe; Jordan C. Kenny; Montel; Noah; Peter; Riley; Zac C.	Jason						
21	Jay	Brandon	Blake Monar; Garin; Tyler S.									
22	Chasen	Ivan	Yosef									
23	Demar	Yosef	Brandon									
24	Ed	AJ; Chris; Jeremy; Jordan M. Mike; Page; Robby; Tyler C.										
25	Yosef	AJ; Chris; Jeremy; Jordan M. Mike; Page; Robby; Tyler C.										
26	Jordan C.	AJ; Chris; Jeremy; Jordan M. Mike; Page; Robby; Tyler C.										
27	Zach J.	AJ; Chris; Jeremy; Jordan M. Mike; Page; Robby; Tyler C.										
28	Brandon	AJ; Chris; Jeremy; Jordan M. Mike; Page; Robby; Tyler C.										
29	Dale	AJ; Chris; Jeremy; Jordan M. Mike; Page; Robby; Tyler C.										
30	Page	AJ; Chris; Jeremy; Jordan M. Mike; Page; Robby; Tyler C.										
31	Tyler S.	AJ; Chris; Jeremy; Jordan M. Mike; Page; Robby; Tyler C.										
32	Spencer (Note: Spencer, Montel, Peter and Noah all entered the competition in Week 3 when Tayshia was introduced as the new Bachelorette.)											
33	Montel											
34	Peter											
35	Noah											

The contestant received the first impression rose
The contestant received a rose during a date
The contestant received a rose during the cocktail party
The contestant was eliminated
The contestant was still in the competition and moved on for a different bachelorette
The contestant was eliminated during a date
The contestant was eliminated outside the rose ceremony
The contestant moved on to the next week by default
The contestant quit the competition
The contestant won the competition

== Episodes ==
No. overall	No. in season	Title	Original release date	Prod. code	U.S. viewers (millions)	Rating (18–49)
170	1	"Week 1: Season Premiere"	October 13, 2020	1601	5.03	1.4
The season begins with Clare receiving the news that she would be the Bachelorette and preparing for the role in March 2020 before the COVID-19 pandemic halted production prior to filming commencing. Four months later, Clare's journey finally begins at La Quinta Resort & Club near Palm Springs after weeks of quarantining and testing, where she meets thirty-one men. Jason arrives with a pregnant belly; Kenny wears a shirt with Clare's dogs on it; Mike brings Clare a pair of sandals; Tyler C. drives a station wagon filled with his belongings; Bennett arrives in a Rolls-Royce Phantom; Eazy runs through a "your future husband" banner; Chasen wears a suit of armor; and Ed rolls in a bubble. Upon meeting Dale, Clare feels as though she's just met her husband. Once they are all inside, Zach J. grabs Clare for the first conversation. Eazy and Clare chat about what calms them down when they're worked up. Ben and Clare have a go at a high striker. Garin gives Clare a portrait of herself that his niece drew. Ed and Clare play ten pin bowling with the orb ball he arrived in. Tyler C. has a mutual friend with Yosef and Tyler C. learns that Yosef may not be on the show for the right reasons. Yosef brings the accusation to Clare and she tries to sort out the situation. Dale receives the first impression rose despite having acquainted with Clare during the delay. AJ, Chris, Jeremy, Jordan M., Mike, Page, Robby and Tyler C. are sent home.
171	2	"Week 2"	October 20, 2020	1602	4.29	1.2
172	3	"Week 3"	October 27, 2020	1603	4.60	1.3
173	4	"Clare Departs"	November 5, 2020 (Note: Episode was moved to Thursday, November 5, 2020, to accommodate special coverage from ABC News regarding updated 2020 United States presidential election results.)	1604	5.61	1.6
174	5	"Tayshia Arrives"	November 10, 2020	1605	5.30	1.7
175	6	"Week 4"	November 17, 2020	1606	4.67	1.4
176	7	"Week 5"	November 24, 2020	1607	4.47	1.3
177	8	"Week 6"	December 1, 2020	1608	4.33	1.2
178	9	"Week 7"	December 8, 2020	1609	4.32	1.2
179	10	"The Men Tell All"	December 14, 2020	1610	4.01	1.0
180	11	"Week 8: Hometowns"	December 15, 2020	1611	4.43	1.1
181	12	"Week 9: Fantasy Suites"	December 21, 2020	1612	4.95	1.2
182	13	"Week 10: Season Finale"	December 22, 2020	1613	5.52	1.4

== Controversy and criticism ==
During a group date on Week 2, 10 of the men played a game of strip dodgeball and during each round, the contestants were asked to remove a layer of clothing. This date was met with widespread controversy and criticism from fans and alumni alike citing a "double standard".

J.P. Rosenbaum, winner of season 7 of The Bachelorette, wrote on Twitter, "I realize this 'date' is gonna have a lot of critics, but can you imagine the flak the show would get if this was [The Bachelor] and the girls were stripping down to their underwear?" Bachelor franchise podcast host Juliet Litman stated, "If it was women in that position, it would be completely unacceptable, absolutely scandalous and there would be this huge outcry. The double standard of objectifying men's bodies like that and asking men to be in that position really bothered me because I would not accept it for women." Former Bachelor Ben Higgins stated that, "If this was a Bachelor season, no way this happens, no way they get away with it, no way it's appropriate, no way this just becomes a weekly topic. I think the show is super smart. They knew this wouldn't shut down the show, but it's pushing the envelope a little bit here." Contestant Yosef Aborady admitted that if he was invited to the group date, he would not have played the dodgeball game, stating, "Number one value is to have respect for myself and my daughter. I don't want her turning on the TV and seeing dad's ass." Aborady ended up being sent home by Crawley later that week due to an argument with her concerning the appropriateness of that date. Many fans expressed disgust with the date on social media.
