= Pollenex =

Personal care appliance brand

- Company type: Brand
- Industry: Consumer products
- Founded: 1948
- Area served: Worldwide
- Products: Home appliances, personal care
- Parent: Conair Corporation
- Website: www.pollenex.com/

Pollenex is a brand name that manufactures primarily personal care appliances, the majority being water-based appliances and shower heads; with a number of other home appliances. It is currently owned by the Conair Corporation.

== History ==
Pollenex originally started as a division of Associated Mills, Inc.. Associated Mills changed its name to the Pollenex Corporation later on. Pollenex was acquired by The Rival Company in 1993. Rival was acquired by Holmes in 1999. When Jarden acquired Holmes in 2005, Pollenex was acquired by the Conair Corporation, and continues to operate as a brand.
