= BaByliss =

French personal care manufacturer

- Type: Société à responsabilité limitée (SARL)
- Industry: Personal care
- Founded: 1960; 66 years ago
- Headquarters: Boulogne-Billancourt, France
- Brands: BaByliss; BaBylissPRO
- Revenue: 174,962,715 € (2024)
- Owner: Conair Corporation (1995–present)
- Number of employees: 100-199 (2022)
- Website: babyliss.com

BaByliss SARL is a French company based in Paris specializing in selling personal care products such as hair dryers, curling irons, and hair straighteners. It is part of the American Conair group.

== History ==
BaByliss began in the Montmartre district by hairdressers René Lelièvre and Roger Lemoine who invented the first electric hair straightener. This was then released and marketed as the BaByliss in July 1960 by Jean-Pierre Feldblum, which revolutionised the hair care industry. After this the company expanded operations all over Western Europe.

In February 1995, Conair Corporation based in America bought a majority share in BaByliss. At that time 45% of the company's sales were abroad, primarily through its subsidiaries in Germany, England, Belgium, the Netherlands and Spain.

It later launched the BaByliss Pro (stylised BaBylissPRO) brand for professional grade hair care products. In 2003, the BaByliss for Men brand was launched with hair and grooming products for men.

BaByliss Pro collaborated with Ferrari starting in 2010, producing hair dryers with engines designed with input from Ferrari engineers.

== Reputation ==
Arab News has cited the brand as having been "the first preference of beauty salons and hairstylists" around the world.

BaByliss has been cited as one of the most popular "big brands" that suffer at the hands of counterfeits.

== Production ==
Manufacturing of appliances is done at several Conair plants, including a facility in Chiuduno, Italy that was acquired from Italian hair dryer company Coif’In in 2009.

== See also ==
- Revlon
- Remington (personal care brand)
- Dyson (company)
