= The Bachelorette (American TV series) season 17 =

Season of US reality television show

The Bachelorette
- Season 17
- Promotional poster
- Starring: Katie Thurston
- Presented by: Tayshia Adams; Kaitlyn Bristowe
- No. of contestants: 31
- Winner: Blake Moynes
- Runner-up: Justin Glaze
- No. of episodes: 10

Release
- Original network: ABC
- Original release: June 7 – August 9, 2021

Additional information
- Filming dates: March 22 – April 24, 2021

Season chronology
- ← Previous; Season 16 Next → Season 18

The seventeenth season of The Bachelorette premiered on June 7, 2021. The season featured 30-year-old Katie Thurston, a bank marketing manager from Lynnwood, Washington.

Thurston previously finished in eleventh place on the 25th season of The Bachelor featuring Matt James. As with the previous season, the entire season was filmed at Hyatt Regency Tamaya Resort & Spa in Santa Ana Pueblo, New Mexico due to the COVID-19 pandemic.

The season concluded on August 9, 2021, with Thurston accepting a proposal from 30-year-old wildlife manager Blake Moynes. They ended their engagement on October 25, 2021. Thurston announced on November 23, 2021, that she was dating John Hersey, whom she had previously eliminated during week two of this season. They announced their break up on June 20, 2022.

== Production ==
=== Casting and contestants ===
Thurston was announced as the Bachelorette by Emmanuel Acho during the After the Final Rose special of the 25th season of The Bachelor on March 15, 2021, alongside season 18 lead Michelle Young.

Notable contestants include Andrew Spencer, who is the cousin of season 14 contestant Clay Harbor.

=== Filming and development ===
The beginning of the series returned to its traditional summer schedule after the previous season was delayed to October 2020 due to the COVID-19 pandemic. As with the last two American Bachelor Nation editions, this season was originally set to be filmed in a bio-secure bubble at the Fairmont Jasper Park Lodge in Jasper, Alberta, Canada. Due to quarantine measures enforced by the Canadian government would require to travel to Canada, production was later pulled from the location in early February 2021 amid travel restrictions. Jasper was eventually visited on the twenty-eighth season of The Bachelor. This season was then filmed in Hyatt Regency Tamaya Resort & Spa in Santa Ana Pueblo, New Mexico.

On March 13, 2021, it was announced that former Bachelorette leads Tayshia Adams and Kaitlyn Bristowe would host this season, replacing long-time series host Chris Harrison following backlash for his support of Rachael Kirkconnell, a contestant on the previous The Bachelor season 25, whose photos resurfaced of her attending an Antebellum South-themed party.

Comedian Heather McDonald, former Bachelor Nick Viall, musicians Laine Hardy and Max Schneider, and drag queens Monét X Change and Shea Couleé made guest appearances this season.

== Contestants ==
34 potential contestants were revealed on March 18, 2021. The final cast of 30 men was released on May 18, 2021. (Note: On the official press release, 29 of the 30 men were revealed, the 30th contestant was later revealed in the premiere episode.) Greg Grippo and Karl Smith were originally cast in season 16, when filming of that season was due to start in March 2020 as television productions were shut down caused by the pandemic, the former was not called back for the rescheduled production in July 2020, and the latter was initially accepted to be brought back on that season but was not selected in the final casting list of that same month.

In week 3, season 16 contestant Blake Moynes joined the cast.

Name	Age	Hometown	Occupation	Outcome	Place	Ref
Blake Moynes	30	Hamilton, Ontario	Wildlife Manager	Winner	1	
Justin Glaze	26	Ellicott City, Maryland	Investment Sales Consultant	Runner-Up	2	
Greg Grippo	27	Edison, New Jersey	Marketing Sales Representative	Week 7	3 (quit)	
Michael Allio	36	Akron, Ohio	Business Owner	Week 7	4 (quit)	
Andrew Spencer	26	Lake Villa, Illinois (Note: Andrew Spencer is originally from Lake Villa, Illinois but was residing in Vienna, Austria at the time of casting and filming.)	Pro Football Player	Week 6	5	
Mike Planeta	31	Surprise, Arizona	Gym Owner	Week 6	6	
Brendan Scanzano	26	Toronto, Ontario	Firefighter Trainee	Week 6	7	
Aaron Clancy	26	Walnut, California	Insurance Agent	Week 5	8–11	
Hunter Montgomery	34	San Angelo, Texas	Software Strategist	Week 5	8–11	
James Bonsall	30	La Jolla, California	Software Salesman	Week 5	8–11	
Tré Cooper	26	Covington, Georgia	Software Engineer	Week 5	8–11	
Connor Brennan	29	Columbia, Illinois	Math Teacher	Week 5	12	
Andrew Milcovich	31	Walnut Creek, California	Deputy District Attorney	Week 4	13–15	
Josh Tylerbest	25	Pembroke Pines, Florida	IT Consultant	Week 4	13–15	
Quartney Mixon	26	McKinney, Texas	Nutrition Entrepreneur	Week 4	13–15	
Christian Smith	26	Newburyport, Massachusetts	Real Estate Agent	Week 3	16–19	
Conor Costello	28	Edmond, Oklahoma	Former Baseball Player	Week 3	16–19	
David Scott	27	Nashville, Tennessee	Technical Product Specialist	Week 3	16–19	
Thomas Jacobs	28	Poway, California	Real Estate Broker	Week 3	16–19	
Garrett Schwartz	29	Salinas, California	Software Marketing Manager	Week 2	20–23	
John Hersey	27	Corte Madera, California	Bartender	Week 2	20–23	
Karl Smith	34	Miami, Florida	Motivational Speaker	Week 2	20–23	
Kyle Howard	26	Sarasota, Florida	Technical Recruiter	Week 2	20–23	
Cody Menk	27	Montclair, New Jersey	Zipper Sales Manager	Week 2	24	
Austin Tinsley	25	Mission Viejo, California	Real Estate Investor	Week 1	25–31	
Brandon Torres	26	Mokena, Illinois	Auto Parts Manager	Week 1	25–31	
Gabriel Everett	35	Charlotte, North Carolina	Entrepreneur	Week 1	25–31	
Jeff Caravello	31	Cranford, New Jersey	Surgical Skin Salesman	Week 1	25–31	
Landon Goesling	25	Coppell, Texas	Basketball Coach	Week 1	25–31	
Marcus Lathan	30	Vancouver, Washington	Real Estate Broker	Week 1	25–31	
Marty Hargrove	25	Reno, Nevada	Dancer	Week 1	25–31	

=== Future appearances ===
==== Bachelor in Paradise ====
Season 7

Aaron Clancy, Connor Brennan, James Bonsall, Karl Smith, Tré Cooper, and Thomas Jacobs returned for season 7 of Bachelor in Paradise. Cooper quit in week 2. Brennan and Smith were eliminated in week 2. Jacobs spilt from Becca Kufrin in week 6, although they later got back together. Bonsall and Clancy split from Anna Redman and Tia Booth, respectively, in week 6.

Season 8

Bonsall, Clancy, Andrew Spencer, Justin Glaze, and Michael Allio returned for season 8 of Bachelor in Paradise. Bonsall and Glaze were eliminated in week 2. Glaze returned in week 4, but was eliminated again in the same week. Spencer quit in week 5. Clancy split from Genevieve Parisi in week 6. Allio left in a relationship with Danielle Maltby in week 6.

Season 9

Blake Moynes returned for season 9 of Bachelor in Paradise. He quit in week 4.

Season 10

Glaze, Spencer, and Kyle Howard returned for season 10 of Bachelor in Paradise. Howard was eliminated in week 1. Glaze quit in week 2. Spencer won $125,000 and left in a relationship with Alexe Godin in the finale.

==== Bachelor in Paradise Canada ====
Season 1

Brendan Scanzano returned for the inaugural season of Bachelor in Paradise Canada. He split from Illeana Pennetto in week 5.

Season 2

Austin Tinsley, Connor Brennan, and Quartney Mixon returned for season 2 of Bachelor in Paradise Canada. Mixon quit in week 2. Brennan split from Lisa Mancini in week 6. Tinsley left in a relationship with Chelsea Vaughn in week 6.

==== FBOY Island ====
Thurston starred in season 3 of The CW's FBOY Island, hosted by Nikki Glaser.

== Call-out order ==
Order	Bachelors	Week							
Order	Bachelors	1	2	3 (Note: Blake officially joined the season after the third rose ceremony.)	4	5	6	7	8
1	Thomas	Greg	Thomas	Connor B.	Blake	Justin	Greg	Blake; Justin	Blake
2	Aaron	Tre	Greg	Michael	Hunter	Blake	Michael	Blake; Justin	Justin
3	Andrew M.	Michael	Andrew S.	Tre	Andrew S.	Andrew S.	Blake	Greg	
4	David	Thomas	David	Hunter	Greg	Greg	Justin	Michael	
5	Michael	Garrett	Hunter	Greg	Aaron	Michael	Andrew S.		
6	Tre	Connor B.	Conor C.	Justin	Michael	Mike	Mike		
7	Greg	Andrew S.	Mike	Brendan	Connor B.	Brendan	Brendan		
8	Gabriel	James	Michael	Andrew S.	James	Aaron; Hunter; James; Tre			
9	John	Justin	Connor B.	Aaron	Justin	Aaron; Hunter; James; Tre			
10	Garrett	Quartney	Quartney	Mike	Mike	Aaron; Hunter; James; Tre			
11	Austin	Karl	Tre	James	Brendan	Aaron; Hunter; James; Tre			
12	Marty	Mike	Justin	Josh	Tre	Connor B.			
13	Landon	John	Andrew M.	Quartney	Andrew M. Josh; Quartney				
14	Karl	Kyle	Christian	Andrew M.	Andrew M. Josh; Quartney				
15	Josh	Andrew M.	Josh	Christian; Conor C. David; Thomas	Andrew M. Josh; Quartney				
16	Andrew S.	Josh	Brendan	Christian; Conor C. David; Thomas					
17	Brandon	Conor C.	James	Christian; Conor C. David; Thomas					
18	Conor C.	Brendan	Aaron	Christian; Conor C. David; Thomas					
19	Kyle	David	Garrett; John; Karl; Kyle						
20	Hunter	Aaron	Garrett; John; Karl; Kyle						
21	Jeff	Christian	Garrett; John; Karl; Kyle						
22	James	Hunter	Garrett; John; Karl; Kyle						
23	Brendan	Cody	Cody						
24	Marcus	Austin; Brandon; Gabriel; Jeff; Landon; Marcus; Marty							
25	Mike	Austin; Brandon; Gabriel; Jeff; Landon; Marcus; Marty							
26	Cody	Austin; Brandon; Gabriel; Jeff; Landon; Marcus; Marty							
27	Justin	Austin; Brandon; Gabriel; Jeff; Landon; Marcus; Marty							
28	Christian	Austin; Brandon; Gabriel; Jeff; Landon; Marcus; Marty							
29	Quartney	Austin; Brandon; Gabriel; Jeff; Landon; Marcus; Marty							
30	Connor B.	Austin; Brandon; Gabriel; Jeff; Landon; Marcus; Marty							
31	Blake								

The contestant received the first impression rose
The contestant received a rose during a date
The contestant received a rose outside of a rose ceremony or date
The contestant was eliminated
The contestant was eliminated during a date
The contestant was eliminated outside the rose ceremony
The contestant quit the competition
The contestant moved on to the next week by default
The contestant won the competition

== Episodes ==
No. overall	No. in season	Title	Original release date	Prod. code	U.S. viewers (millions)	Rating (18–49)
183	1	"Week 1: Season Premiere"	June 7, 2021	1701	3.77	1.0
The season begins with Katie and surprise new co-hosts, former bachelorettes Tayshia Adams and Kaitlyn Bristowe who give her advice on being the bachelorette. The night begins at the Hyatt Regency Tamaya Resort & Spa. After Katie enters the men are introduced - Marty holds crystals, Greg presents Katie with a necklace made by his niece, Brendan shows Katie how to play ice hockey, Aaron and Cody chat together, James is revealed from inside a box. Connor B. teaches Katie how to play a plastic piano with his feet, and kisses her. Katie gives the first impression rose to Greg. At the rose ceremony, Austin, Brandon, Gabriel, Jeff, Landon, Marcus and Marty are sent home.
184	2	"Week 2"	June 14, 2021	1702	3.32	0.9
Tayshia and Kaitlyn come in to see Katie and give their pep time when sharing an advice on the upcoming dates. The first group date of the season consists of Christian, Garrett, Tre, Quartney, Mike, James, Justin, Thomas, Connor B. and Karl, and is a sex-themed play. Heather McDonald mentors the men for a skit where they are quizzed on women's clothing - Connor B. and Christian raised their hands to give an answer, Mike does not give an answer, Quartney gets all the answers right. Connor B. performs a song, James shows off in underwear to the audience. Mike won the "Greatest Love of All Time" event after giving a speech. At the night portion, Connor B. and Thomas both kiss Katie and Connor B receives the group date rose. Greg has the first one-on-one date for the season - a picnic. He and Katie travel to nearby bush to set up the picnic together, Greg does not know assemble a portable toilet. He gives a kiss to Katie and they go fishing. At the night portion, Katie opens up to Greg about her father's passing and Greg tells her about his own father's death a couple of years earlier. Greg receives the date rose. Tayshia and Kaitlyn are in cowgirl outfits and wake up John, Andrew S., Kyle, Josh, Aaron, Brendan, Hunter and Cody for their second group date. The men are to compete in a mud wrestling event called "Katie's Big Bucket Brawl". They split in two teams of four, Kyle and Andrew S. face compete, and Aaron and Cody are in the final event causing a tension between them. Aaron ends up winning the Big Buckle and he tells Katie that he and Cody knew each other prior to joining the show. Katie accuses Cody of not being there for the right reasons, and instead wanting fame. Cody and Aaron confront each other, and Katie sends Cody home. Andrew S. then spends time Katie - they kiss and Katie gives him the date rose. At the cocktail party, Michael has one-on-one time with Katie and felt he had a good connection with her that he could even he could get a date. Karl accuses the other men of being untrustworthy, and Katie accuses them of being dishonest, with Karl and Aaron being there for the wrong reasons. The episode ends with a cliffhanger.
185	3	"Week 3, Part 1"	June 21, 2021	1703	3.49	0.9
Concluding from the previous episode, Katie has conversations with Karl and Aaron, and accusations are thrown from the men towards Aaron, leading Katie to cancel the cocktail party. At the rose ceremony, Katie talks to Tayshia and Kaitlyn and says that she wanted to keep Karl, however ultimately sends him home along with Garrett, John and Kyle. The group date has Aaron, Quartney, James, Connor B., David, Justin, Thomas, Hunter and Brendan talk about emotional veracity. The Bachelor season 21 star Nick Viall makes an appearance. The men take part in a therapy session. The men talk about their lives, including Hunter who tells the men about being a single father and his first marriage which did not work out due to his focus on his work. Connor B. had dropped out of postgraduate education due to struggles with alcoholism. Katie then talks about a previous relationship with a man who assaulted her over 10 years ago, and the continuing emotional impact. During the night portion of the date, the other men voice criticism towards Thomas for his answer during the date. Thomas discusses Aaron with Katie. Connor B. gets the date rose. Michael has the one-on-one date, where he has a dune buggy ride with Katie. Michael shares a kiss with Katie and tells her his backstory about being a single dad to his 4-year-old son James when his late wife died in 2019 from breast cancer and receives the date rose. Back at the hotel, Brendan confronts Thomas about being a pathological liar. Hunter then accuses Thomas of vying for the next Bachelor role. The episode ends on a cliffhanger.
186	4	"Week 3, Part 2"	June 28, 2021	1704	3.32	0.8
Concluding from the previous episode, Thomas is still insisted with his interest of the role as the bachelor, he starts to plea with Quartney working on his deltoids, being tried on his culprit to exacerbate for being honest. The second group date from Week 3 had Christian, Tre, Andrew S., Greg, Andrew M., Josh, Mike and Connor C. where they participate for "Katie's Truth or Dare". Tayshia explains them on how being physical, mental and emotional on the tasks would be for the day. The snacks are to face on a carb station is to eat a plate of 42 Twinkies bars and a huge bowl of pasta. Mike has eaten a lot of Twinkies, while Andrew S. gives a shot, Greg soon gives a fool around whispering into the giant ear, Christian gives Tre a massage. While the final challenge that the men have to eat a plate of two habanero peppers and Greg gets a lot of fun. At the night portion, Katie gets to spend time with the men especially Andrew S. to start his own time, and Andrew M. showing a lot of sparkle. Greg is feeling out on a comfort zone and thinks that dating a woman with the bunch of the other guys at the same time. Tre then gets a talk with Katie and telling about Thomas for being on the latter's unusual attention especially his manipulative behavior on the show. Andrew S. then saves the night to chastise Tre for his decision. And in the end, Katie presents the rose to Tre. The day of the cocktail party, Tayshia comes in to meet with Katie and tells her that a man from the previous season, believing that he would be a good match for Katie. The man is revealed to be Blake Moynes, Katie greets Blake for a smile and hug. They met previously before the show when season 25 of The Bachelor was still airing. Katie then reveals on her confessional they did communicate through social media. If Blake joins the show, Katie might be his third bachelorette despite having competed with Clare Crawley and Tayshia on that same season. At the cocktail party, Katie looks for Thomas where he has found at the room as they were immediately showing their gestures in which on a reluctant note. Thomas then shows on being the victim side that neither of the guys trust him, Katie then asked him about on his bachelor audition. Thomas then claims on his devastation and he soon joins on the cocktail party. Thomas is there as the men are not pleased on their dismay, especially Aaron, Christian and Justin which they led up on a shouting match. Andrew S. started to yell Aaron for the right opinion until Katie shows up. The men has soon to show their reiterate on actions against Thomas. At the rose ceremony, Thomas began to apologize Katie for the wrong reasons having had disrespect on the show. When Katie was planning to give the final rose to Thomas and stopped by when she said, "You told me the things I wanted to hear. But what I learned about you tonight is that you're selfish, unkind, and a liar. Your Bachelor audition ends tonight… so get out", Katie pointed him on his exit. In addition to Thomas, Christian, Connor C. and David are also sent home. Afterwards, Katie then goes to Blake's room and he officially joins the show.
187	5	"Week 4"	July 5, 2021	1705	3.52	0.8
Shortly after Blake joined the show, Tayshia informs the men as they will meet Blake with most men recognizing him from the previous season. Blake has the one-on-one date where he met with Katie for a horseback ride, Blake is more terrified with horses even when the horse stopped. They set up a picnic and share a kiss. At the night portion, Katie pens up about her sexual assault story. Blake then receives the date rose and Laine Hardy made its appearance at the end of the date. Greg, Quartney, Aaron, Mike, Michael, Andrew M., Josh, Justin, Brendan, James, Connor B., Tre and Hunter took part on the group date where they ride on a bus in a middle of nowhere where they have to participate on a "rugby meets basketball" with a twist on the activity "Bachelorette Bash Ball Battle". They were met by Bachelor Nation alum Wells Adams and celebrity photographer Franco Lacosta, where they judge and give the commentary. They were split in uneven number of teams, with the winning team would win and spend the after party with Katie, while the losing team will be sent home. The red team took an early lead, Hunter was very aggressive when hitting a ball, having knocked Mike. Michael soon tossed the ball against with the opposite team as Justin grabs him until medics arrived but Michael was able to stand and was completely on relief. Both teams won after resulted in a tie and have invited at the after party. At that party, Michael opens up his special day for his late wife's birth anniversary and soon they gave a kiss. Connor presents a ukulele to play a song for Katie. The men started to hate Hunter due to his abrasive personality. Hunter received the date rose. Andrew S. has the one-on-one date to take place at night, Katie brings two kerosene lamps where they walk into the woods with dozens of string lights and pink envelopes. Then, they grab several bats. Andrew S. opens up his backstory when he was being raised by a single mom when his dad was sent to prison, and football became his priority on his career. Andrew then gives his concern on interracial romance, and he has received the date rose. The final cocktail party of the week that Aaron is more stressed on his own situation and punches his hand through on a wall. Katie then soon arrives as Justin presents the card to show Katie to play "would you rather" game. Hunter then gives stargazing throughout the night, and James interrupts Hunter, that became a huge disappointment for James. At the rose ceremony, Andrew M., Josh and Quartney are sent home.
188	6	"Week 5"	July 12, 2021	1706	3.72	0.9
The morning after the previous rose ceremony, Katie meets up with Tayshia and Kaitlyn and thanks Tayshia for bringing Blake onto the show. Justin was called for the one-on-one date, whereas he might get nervous to see as to take part for a wedding photo themed date with Katie. Franco Lacosta appears once again to direct on arts. Katie is shown a scrapbook drawing of a potential wedding dress. Katie and Justin set up for a fake wedding and they soon gave a kiss at the wooden arch. At the night portion, Katie tells Justin that when her father died she found out he was not her biological father that her mom made a secret. Justin ends up with a date rose and Max Schneider performs on the stage. Blake, Andrew, Michael, Greg, Aaron, Mike, Brendan, James, Tre and Hunter took part for the group date as they met with drag queens Monét X Change and Shea Couleé from RuPaul's Drag Race on a drag queen style called "The Great Royal Debate". Where the men will take the role as drag queens. Hunter began the debate as Greg reads a poem for Katie. Tre made a huge dishonest with the guys, thinking that Hunter could be a true honest, Andrew accepts the challenge. At the after party, Andrew and Katie gave a smooch kiss, Blake's connection with Katie grew a little stronger, Hunter has the drama believed on the wrong side. Katie soon whispered herself at the ladies' room reflecting with bad encounters. As a result, neither of the guys received the rose. Connor B. has the one-on-one date to meet with Katie where they have to spend time with Kaitlyn and her fiancé, season fourteen contestant Jason Tartick for the afternoon on a four-on-one time together where the men grill their meals, playing volleyball and humorous jokes. Katie then gave Connor a kiss. At the after party, Katie thinks that she has no chemistry with Connor as she arrives at Connor's hotel room, saying goodbye and he returns to the hotel to tell the men. Shortly after the date, Blake shows up once again presenting a vintage radio set where Katie prepares to meet him downstairs and the two started with a kiss. At the rose ceremony, Katie steps aside to bring Hunter and they have a talk together, this was resulted on his elimination along with Aaron, James and Tre.
189	7	"Week 6"	July 19, 2021	1707	3.87	0.9
With the hometown dates are getting close, Brendan and Mike are the few ones who has yet to call for their one-on-one dates. Greg has the second one-on-one date for the season, showing around the version of Seattle with a sign of Pike Place Market. Katie then gave Greg a fish to toss around. As they have shucked several oysters from the football pit from a turf. Greg really likes Katie even on his likeliness with the woman that Katie would meet his family soon. At the night portion, Katie and Greg share a kiss with a setting of Seattle rain and he receives the date rose. Back at the hotel, Michael gave his time to FaceTime with his son James at home. Brendan then goes to Katie on her hotel room to have started talking, told that he had not spent over in between group date or a cocktail party. Katie then shows on her connection with Brendan felt physically weak and he has decided to go. Therefore, Blake, Justin, Andrew S. and Michael were called for the final group date of the season where they took part for a sexual themed artwork painting series of vaginas by Jacqueline Secor. Blake's less artistic skills that could not explain on his physical work, Andrew's painting looks totally weird like a zombie eating sushi. At the night portion, Katie opens up his feelings with the guys, Michael assured his time where he would bring his family especially his son James, who is very close to him, Andrew tells Katie about his difficulty that he might end his football career. Michael ends up receiving the date rose. Mike has the final one-on-one date for the season to meet with Queen Jean, who is a cuddle expert to think that Mike and Katie could be a perfect couple. As they changed into plain white clothes on a cuddle platform even with a lap of luxury. Cuddling continues when Mike gives a whisper on Katie's ear. Katie then let Mike on thinking about their time as she is more with the other guys, Mike has sent home. At the rose ceremony, Andrew is sent home and Katie gets her time to take a seat one last time before Andrew leaving. Then, Andrew shows up on Katie's room after getting eliminated and an envelope left on a floor whenever Katie would read it, she gave Andrew a hug.
190	8	"The Men Tell All"	July 26, 2021 (Note: Week 8: The Men Tell All and Week 9: Hometowns were aired during the 2020 Summer Olympics.)	1708	3.36	0.8
Katie and Tayshia are strolling to prepare the hometown dates. Michael, who misses his son James, Facetimes with him. James truly doesn't understand on Michael's plan to go home and to be with his son. Then, Michael goes to Katie's room and they have talked together on his emotional tears that being for his son. Hometowns are quite hard for him that he really wants to spend more and more time with his son and soon leaves the competition. The special has thirteen of twenty-seven eliminated men are present. Old rivalries are reignited especially Aaron and Cody, explained on Cody's reckless social media posts knowing that he would become famous one day. Brendan shows his disrespect and Karl accuses his rude behavior causing to fight against each other, and Quartney started his heated debate. Hunter shows on his dishonest conversation with the guys as he was trying to defend Connor B. to tell with the wrong reasons. Connor B. is on the hot seat being interviewed by Kaitlyn that he was thinking to be a trash kisser, and according to Connor that one of his ex-girlfriends said that he was a good kisser. Andrew S. soon gives chanting to send a woman named Tara from the audience and sat down with Connor to give her a kiss. Andrew is next and even showing his offensive tweets from the past being resurfaced online. Michael is next telling about his backstory as a single father, encouraging all single parents trying to keep up together, stated that on his potential role in The Bachelor. Several scenes from the past dates were completely edited out from the broadcast, and Kaitlyn and Jason watching their video highlighted on their proposal. Katie is finally on the hot seat, she is asking not to give Michael a second chance that she really wants to move forward. Then, Katie has showing love and respect for both Aaron and Andrew. Thomas appears via Zoom where he gives an apology. And bloopers are finally shown.
191	9	"Week 7: Hometowns"	August 2, 2021	1709	3.66	1.0
When it left off following Michael's self-elimination last week, the hometown dates has begun. Blake's "hometown" theme is stated on his words, "to be as vulnerable as I can with the feeling of love", even passing with the fake border crossing. It brought contents from Canada such as hockey skates, maple leaf and a bar stocked with maple syrup. Katie began to taste the syrup and even they play a game of darts and playing street hockey in maple leaf jerseys until they hit a point on a penalty box. Then, Katie meets Blake's mom Emily, his sister Taylor and his brother Cody, the mom stated that Katie's chemistry with Blake could be instant, and Blake talked with his sister showing on his participation meeting three women. Later on, Blake gave Katie one last kiss as thinking of engagement. The "Welcome to Baltimore" sign placed outside the hotel as prepares for Justin's "hometown" theme, where he and Katie took on a horse carriage ride overlooking a graffiti alley before stopped to eat a plate of hepatopancreas crab. Justin tells to Katie that his parents won't be there but his two best friends, Herb and Tommy, are there on their place and soon Katie, Justin and his best friends started to cheer a toast. Justin's best friend Herb sat down to talk with Katie to tell having met all of the 30 men in the first night, including Justin, but Herb started to worry Justin if he hasn't going to fall in love and ending the couple with a kiss. The last "hometown" theme where Greg involved on a tandem bike ride with a Jersey Shore setting that includes a treat of pork sandwich and artificial oceanic waves with surfing board. Greg and Katie played basketball together. Then, Katie has going to meet with Greg's mom Sandy, his older brother Joe and his best friend Dave once they show up at the front door on the rental house before the couple having kissed. The video came from Greg's sisters Andrea and Samantha, as the one is pregnant and the other had got a new job, as they would send Greg and Katie for love. Katie then started to talk with Greg's brother about losing both of their fathers, and she talks with Greg's mom feeling on Greg's potential relationship with Katie that has felt within a matter of romantic connection. Greg then assured his mom on admitting with Katie. Before saying goodbye to Katie, Greg then sits down to debrief on Katie's visit with his family, showing on a down spiral moment with Katie's reaction and she gave him a smile. Greg than explained Katie on his acting skills, caused to start on his meltdowns. Katie then asked another private conversation with Greg on a dark hallway that Greg could not insist convincing with his decision, Greg then walks off the room. The next day, Greg reeled on his unfaithful decision and he gives Katie to talk expressing on how met his family during the "hometown" themed date, expressing his heart that he started to accuse Katie that he is not giving up with the relationship, and Katie stated on her apology with Greg on a very important conversation with Katie's lack of trust and emotion, she felt that starting to lose her chemistry on Greg and was favored to give Greg to stay, Katie then asked that Greg was ready to start a relationship but Greg was soon heartbroken and leaves the room. Katie then soon left as well and goes to her room when she sobs on a bathroom, Kaitlyn comes in to grab Katie an attention, starting on their heart-to-heart conversation where Katie began to whimper.
192	10	"Week 8: Season Finale & After the Final Rose"	August 9, 2021	1710	4.60	1.3
Katie had convinced when she locked out of the bathroom as she demanded to book a flight home as planned, but she had already quit the show after her heated drama with Greg from the previous week. Kaitlyn then goes to the hotel and Katie is found at the hotel even they give a hug, and Katie sits down on the couch explained on the post-mortem drama. Katie has thought that she begged Greg to stay and then whispered her interactions between her anger and sadness on her breakup with Greg as trying to get understand with the relationship. Tayshia and Kaitlyn come in to get attention with the remaining men, Blake and Justin have learned that Greg already left as the fantasy dates are about to start. Blake goes for his fantasy date with Katie learning the events of Greg's departure and they give a smooch kiss. They have involved with paint-filed water balloons and a hot tub. As the two get relaxed on a wooden hot tub, Katie tells Blake about the events of the men had departed earlier in the season and then she asked Blake for the upcoming suites and meeting with her family when Katie admitting on her time with Blake and he listens with a good response and he and Katie have got make out once again. At dinner portion, Blake has telling Katie that he really loves her, explaining to her about the love of his parents. Katie then declared on her love with Blake and accepts the fantasy suite invitation with a breakfast on bed. The next day, Katie goes to Justin to tell the news that she is more in love with Blake than him, Justin as he leaves heartbroken. Justin appears in the hot seat and met with Katie for the first time since she dumped him, explain on the biggest heartbreak and could not really do with the process as Justin wiped away in tears before exiting to the audience. Blake has an opportunity to meet Katie's family at the hotel, Katie's mom Rhonda Lee gave a hug from Blake, as well as Katie's aunt Lindsey. Katie's aunt talks with Blake about his planned non-profit work in Africa and then explains to Blake that he would have a vibrator, and Blake did not have the item that Blake really understands the decision. Katie gets her time with her mom knowing about skepticism about her biological father, and her aunt then makes her another time with Katie as given a suggestion that might travel to Canada for Blake. Katie's mom and aunt has a better conversation on Blake that he wants an engagement at the end. The final date involves Blake and Katie travelling to the desert at night to meet with Felicia, a spiritual healer to take part for an annual Zozobra ritual to write down their fears, insecurities and regrets. Katie then writes in her own journal on her potential future together with Blake and they have watched the ritual. Neil Lane arrives in New Mexico that wasn't originally planned to travel early but he was there to surprise Blake an engagement ring for Katie. Blake becomes little nervous on what ring he would get and chose the fifth one. Katie comes for the final rose ceremony location as Blake arrives on that location when he sees Tayshia and Kaitlyn to await his answers, Blake proposed down on one knee and he and Katie are now engaged, earning Blake a final rose. Then, Greg is invited to the hot seat and explains his behavior. Greg felt he had a hard time during the show, and Katie gives her time to talk with Greg that she didn't even bother about Greg and his attitude that he has learned who attended acting school in Manhattan. Then, Greg apologizes Katie many times but Katie isn't totally satisfied with the choice meaning he has no chance to marry a woman of his dreams. Blake then appears on the hot seat with Katie, explaining on their relationship and their future together, and they gave a hug together, replaying the song from the first one-on-one date earlier in the season.
