= Rizzotti =

Rizzotti (pronounced [ritˈtsɔtti]) is an Italian surname from Northeast Italy and Sicily, originally indicating a curly-haired person. Notable people with the surname include:

- Alfredo Rizzotti (1909–1972), Brazilian artist
- Jennifer Rizzotti (born 1974), American basketball player
- Jorge Rizzotti, Argentine politician
- Maria Rizzotti (born 1953), Italian politician
- Matt Rizzotti (born 1985), American baseball player

== See also ==
- Rizzotto
- Rizzuti
