= Leandro Rizzuto Jr. =

American businessman (born 1962)

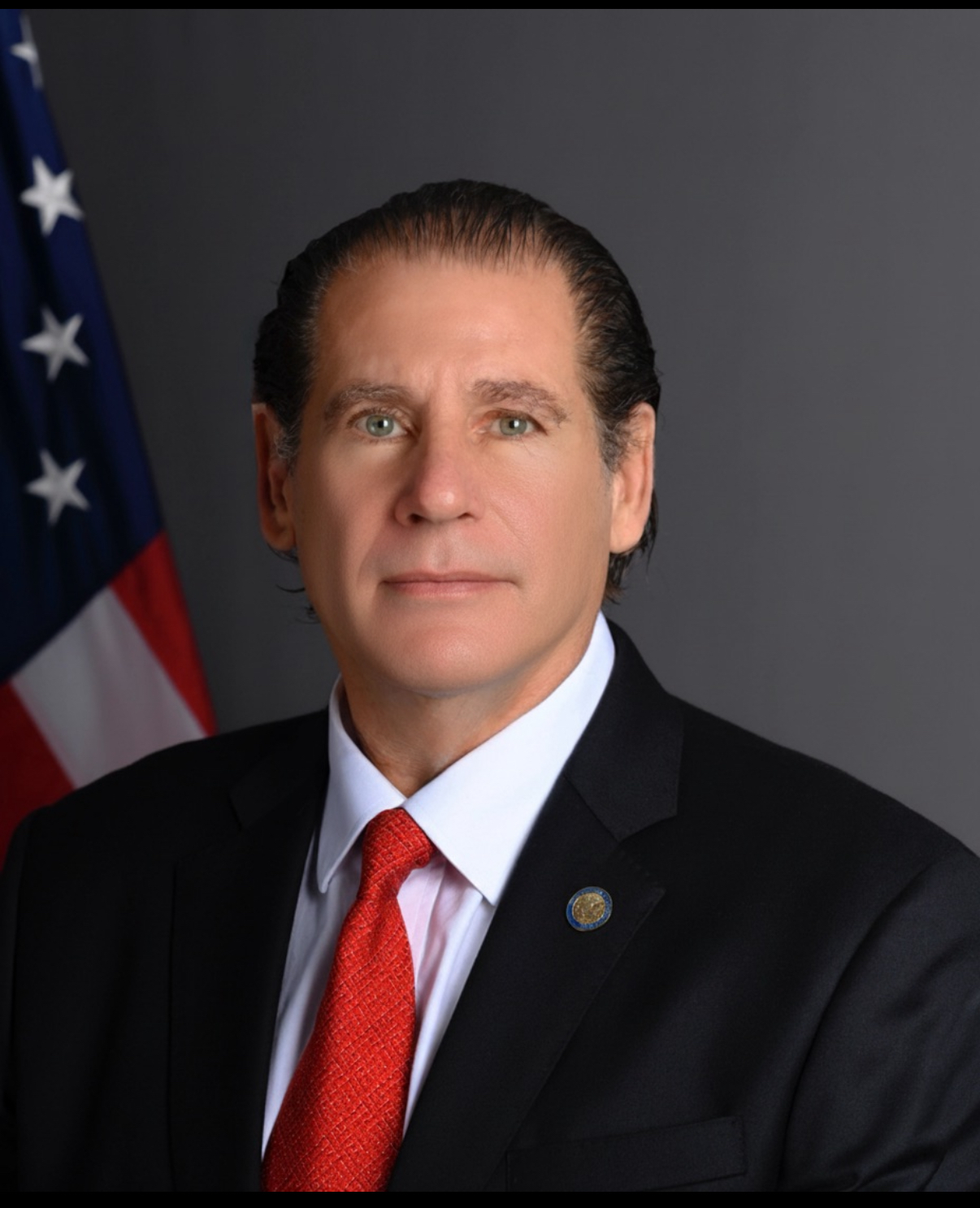
- Official portrait, 2025

United States Ambassador to the Organization of American States
- Incumbent
- Assumed office October 28, 2025
- President: Donald Trump
- Preceded by: Francisco O. Mora

Consul General in Hamilton, Bermuda
- In office May, 2020 – January 20, 2021

Personal details
- Born: March 20, 1962 (age 64) New York City, U.S.
- Party: Republican
- Spouse: Denise Rizzuto
- Children: 3
- Parent(s): Leandro Rizzuto; Rita Rizzuto
- Education: Arizona State University (did not finish)
- Occupation: Businessman

Leandro Rizzuto Jr. (born March 20, 1962) is an American businessman who is ambassador to the Organization of American States in the second Trump administration. He was U.S. Consul General in Hamilton, Bermuda during the first Trump administration. He was unsuccessfully nominated by President Donald Trump to become the next United States ambassador to Barbados. Trump subsequently appointed him to the diplomatic post in Bermuda, a position that did not require confirmation by the Senate. On October 7, 2025, Rizzuto was confirmed by the Senate as OAS ambassador.

He is the son of Leandro Rizzuto, billionaire founder of Conair Corporation. Rizzuto previously worked as a senior executive in his father's company.

== Early life ==
Leandro Rizzuto Jr. was born on March 20, 1962, in Brooklyn, New York, the son of Leandro Rizzuto and his wife Rita Rizzuto.

Rizzuto studied marketing at Arizona State University from 1980 to 1982, but left to work for the family businesses.

== Career ==
Rizzuto spent most of his career with Conair Corporation, of which his father was chairman and near 100% owner until his death in December 2017, rising to senior vice president for professional global business units.

During the 2016 presidential campaign, he spread fringe conspiracy theories about Trump's political opponents, such as Ted Cruz, John Kasich and Scott Walker.

In January 2018, Donald Trump nominated Rizzuto to be Ambassador Extraordinary and Plenipotentiary to Barbados, St. Kitts and Nevis, and Saint Lucia. Just two weeks later, Rizzuto pledged more than $15,000 to fund Trump's club at Mar-a-Lago. Rizzuto had donated over $345,000 to the Trump campaign and state and national Republican parties in the 2016 cycle. Rizzuto's nomination failed, as the Senate sent Rizzuto's nomination back in January 2020.

In May 2020, Trump gave Rizzuto the position of principal officer at the US Consulate General in Hamilton, Bermuda. This position did not require confirmation by the Senate.

His appointment to the role in Bermuda was met with resistance and protest.

In December 2024, Rizzuto was announced as nominee to be the United States ambassador to the Organization of American States in the second Trump administration. In October 7, 2025, the Senate voted to confirm Rizutto as ambassador.

== Personal life ==
He is married to Denise Rizzuto and they have three children.
