= Rizzotto =

Rizzotto (pronounced [ritˈtsɔtto]) is an Italian surname from Veneto and Sicily, originally indicating a curly-haired person. Notable people with the surname include:

- Cosimo Rizzotto (1893–1963), Italian World War I flying ace
- Giulia Cassini Rizzotto (1865–1943), Italian actress and film director
- Laura Rizzotto (born 1994), Brazilian-Latvian singer
- Mario Rizotto (born 1984), Uruguayan footballer
- Placido Rizzotto (1914–1948), Italian socialist trade union leader
- Vincent M. Rizzotto (1931–2021), American Catholic prelate

== See also ==
- Rizzotti
- Rizzuto
