= Leandro Rizzuto =

American billionaire businessman (1938–2017)

- Born: April 10, 1938; New York City, US
- Died: December 3, 2017 (aged 79)
- Education: St. John's University (dropped out)
- Occupation: Businessman
- Spouse: Rita Rizzuto (divorced)
- Children: 4, including Leandro Jr.

Leandro P. "Lee" Rizzuto (April 10, 1938 – December 3, 2017) was an American billionaire businessman, and the chairman and co-founder of Conair Corporation, which was almost fully owned by him.

== Early life ==
He was born in Brooklyn, the son of Julian and Josephine Rizzuto. His father was born Nicola in Italy, but later changed his name to Julian although Josephine's New York Times 1983 obituary refers to him as Nicola.

Leandro had two sisters, Anita Casamento of Brooklyn and Pauline Navarra of Phoenix.

In 1959, Rizzuto dropped out of St. John's University to assist his family in setting up a hair products business in the basement of their Brooklyn home; this would later become Conair.

== Career ==
In December 2017, his net worth was estimated at $3.5 billion.

== Personal life ==
He was divorced, with four children, and lived in Sheridan, Wyoming.

On December 3, 2017, Rizzuto died from pancreatic cancer.

On January 5, 2018, President Donald Trump appointed his son Leandro Rizzuto Jr., to the position of Ambassador Extraordinary and Plenipotentiary of the United States to Barbados, as well as St. Kitts and Nevis and Saint Lucia.
