= Dale Moss =

American football player (born 1988)

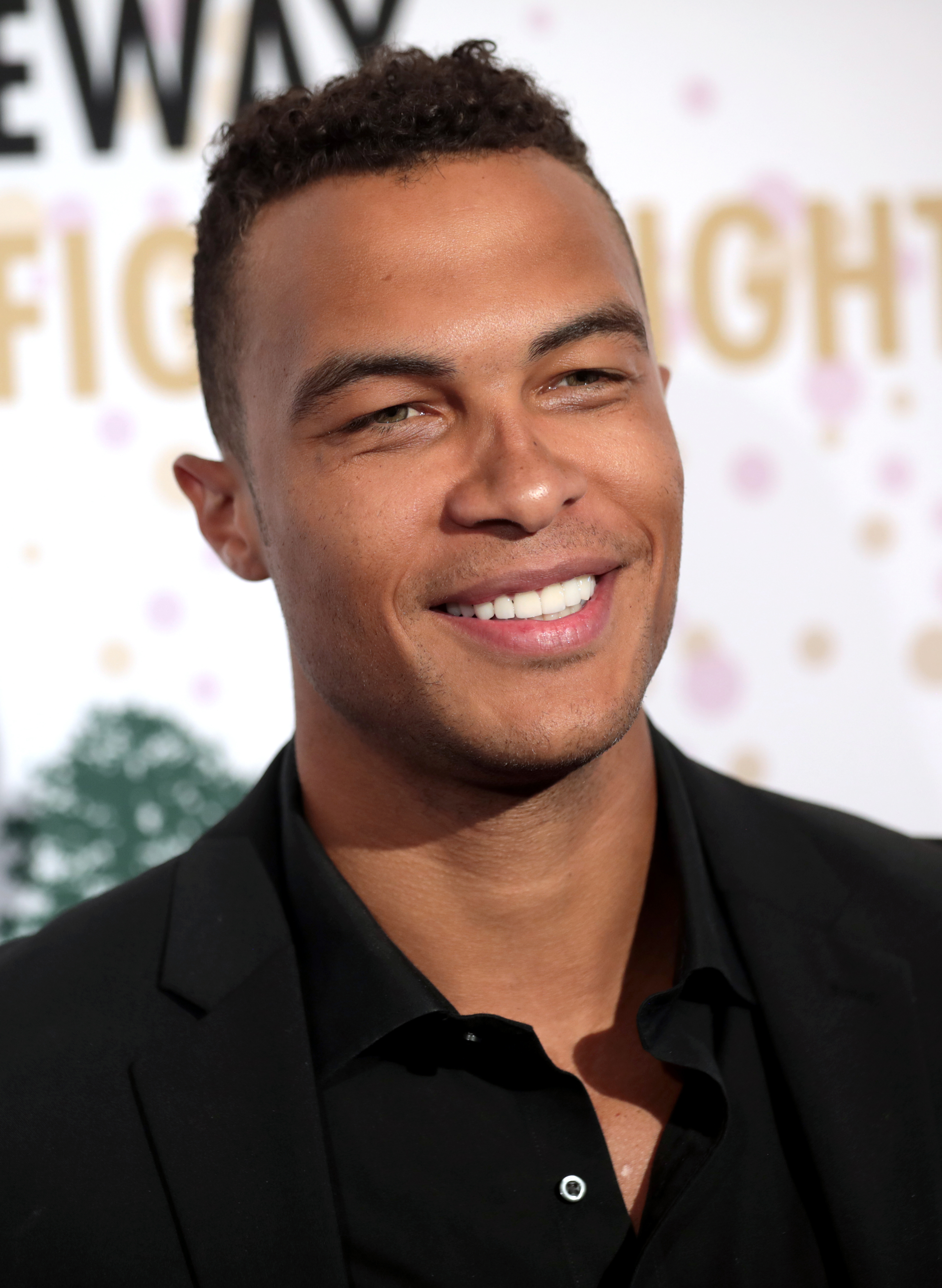
- Moss in 2022

Profile
- Position: Wide receiver

Personal information
- Born: September 24, 1988 (age 38); Brandon, South Dakota
- Listed height: 6 ft 3 in (1.91 m)
- Listed weight: 215 lb (98 kg)

Career information
- High school: Brandon Valley High School, South Dakota
- College: South Dakota State
- NFL draft: 2012: undrafted

Career history
- Green Bay Packers (2012)*; Tampa Bay Buccaneers (2012)*; Chicago Bears (2012−2013)*; Carolina Panthers (2013)*; Los Angeles Kiss (2014); Chicago Bears (2014)*
- * Offseason or practice squad member only

Career AFL statistics as of 2014
- Receptions: 9
- Receiving yards: 51
- Receiving TDs: 1
- Stats at ArenaFan.com
- Stats at Pro Football Reference

Dale Moss (born September 24, 1988) is an American former football wide receiver and reality television personality. He played college football for the South Dakota State Jackrabbits, before serving as a member of offseason and practice squad rosters for the Green Bay Packers, Tampa Bay Buccaneers, Chicago Bears, and Carolina Panthers, as well as the Los Angeles Kiss of the Arena Football League. After his NFL career, Moss pursued a reality television career, including an engagement to Clare Crawley during the 16th season of ABC's The Bachelorette, where they left the show early as a couple and ultimately broke up shortly thereafter. (Note: Crawley chose Moss in the 4th episode of the season, and the two left the show. Tayshia Adams replaced Crawley as the Bachelorette, and chose Zac Clark.)

== Early life and education ==
Moss grew up in Brandon, South Dakota, with four sisters. He is the son of Delores and Dale Sr, an interracial couple. The nephew of 1972 Heisman Trophy winner Johnny Rodgers, Moss played basketball, football, and track and field at Brandon Valley High School.

Moss attended South Dakota State University and majored in consumer affairs/business economics. He played for South Dakota State's basketball team for four years and their football team for one season.

== Career ==
=== Football ===
After going undrafted in the 2012 NFL draft, Moss signed with the Green Bay Packers on May 11, 2012. He was waived at the end of the preseason during final roster cuts on August 31, 2012. He then signed with the practice squad of the Tampa Bay Buccaneers on September 3, 2012, and was released on November 13. Two weeks later, he signed with the practice squad of the Chicago Bears.

After spending the remainder of the 2012 NFL season on the Bears' practice squad, he signed a reserve/futures contract with the team on December 31, 2012. He was waived on June 10, 2013. Moss then was signed by the Carolina Panthers on June 19, 2013, and was waived on August 24, 2013.

Moss was assigned to the Los Angeles Kiss of the Arena Football League in January 2014. After making nine catches for the Kiss, he was placed on recallable reassignment on April 23, 2014. He re-signed with the Chicago Bears on July 29, 2014, and was waived during final roster cuts on August 30, 2014.

=== The Bachelorette ===
In July 2020, Moss was named one of 42 potential single men chosen to compete for Clare Crawley on season 16 of the ABC dating competition show The Bachelorette. He eventually made the cast and received the "first impression rose" on the first episode of the season. Crawley selected Moss as her partner in the fourth episode and left the show as a couple before the season's end.

== Personal life ==
Moss serves as a global ambassador for the Special Olympics, after being inspired by his older sister who has an intellectual and physical disability. He was engaged to Clare Crawley until their split in January 2021, reuniting a month later. They broke up for good in September 2021. In 2022, he began dating former Goldman Sachs asset and wealth management executive and HGTV home designer Galey Alix Gravenstein, but they broke up two and a half years later in 2024.
