= Katie Thurston =

American television personality (born 1991)

- Born: Katie Lane Thurston; January 3, 1991 (age 35); Lynnwood, Washington, U.S.
- Occupation: TV personality
- Years active: 2021–present
- Spouse: Jeff Arcuri (m. 2025)

Katie Lane Thurston (born January 3, 1991) is an American television personality. She received national recognition as a contestant on season 25 of The Bachelor, and as the star of season 17 of The Bachelorette.

== Early life and education ==
Thurston was raised in Lynnwood, Washington. She played the position of libero on the volleyball team at Lynnwood High School.

== Television career ==
=== The Bachelor ===
Thurston first appeared as a contestant on Matt James' season of The Bachelor, where she finished in 11th place after being eliminated in week 6. During her time on The Bachelor, Thurston became a fan favorite after standing up to the bullying in the house.

=== The Bachelorette ===
Thurston and Michelle Young were announced as the leads of consecutive Bachelorette seasons on March 15, 2021, during the Bachelor season 25 After the Final Rose special.

=== Bachelor In Paradise ===
Thurston made a guest appearance on Season 9 Episode 8 of Bachelor in Paradise where she helped contestants participate in a stand-up comedy roast.

=== FBOY Island ===
On July 10, 2023, Thurston was announced as one of the leads for season 3 of The CW's FBOY Island.

== Personal life ==
Prior to appearing on The Bachelor, Thurston worked as a bank marketing manager in Renton, Washington, and had also gained a large following on the social media platform TikTok for her adult humor and sex positive videos. Since starring on The Bachelorette, Thurston has pursued a career in stand-up comedy.

Thurston was engaged to Blake Moynes, whom she chose as the winner on the 17th season of The Bachelorette. They announced their mutual breakup in October 2021. The next month, she confirmed that she was in a relationship with John Hersey, a contestant on her season who was eliminated in week two. Thurston and Hersey broke up in June 2022.

On June 14, 2024, Thurston confirmed she was in a relationship with comedian Jeff Arcuri, whom she started dating in May 2024. On September 15, Thurston and Arcuri announced their engagement. They got married in their home on March 22, 2025.

In February 2025, she announced she had been diagnosed with stage 4 breast cancer.

Preceded by Tayshia Adams	The Bachelorette; Season 17	Succeeded by Michelle Young
