= Conair Corporation =

American company based in Stamford, Connecticut

- Type: Private
- Industry: Consumer goods
- Founded: 1959; 67 years ago
- Founders: Julian Rizzuto, Leandro Rizzuto
- Headquarters: Stamford, Connecticut, U.S.
- Key people: Ronald T. Diamond (vice chairman); Kristie Juster (president & CEO)
- Products: Hair care appliances, tools and accessories, personal care, travel accessories, small consumer and commercial kitchen appliances, cookware, tools, etc.
- Brands: Conair, BaByliss/BaBylissPRO, Scunci, Cuisinart, Waring, Allegro, Interplak, TravelSmart, Conair Hospitality, ConairPRO Pet
- Revenue: ▼US$2.11 billion (2016)
- Owner: American Securities
- Number of employees: 3,571 (2016)
- Subsidiaries: Babyliss SARL
- Website: www.conair.com

Conair Corporation is an American company based in Stamford, Connecticut, which sells small appliances, personal care products, and health and beauty products for both professionals and consumers.

It is majority-owned by private equity firm American Securities, with some minority stakes held by family members of founder Leandro Rizzuto.

== History ==
Founded in 1959 in a garage in Queens, New York, Conair started out by selling hair rollers and then hair dryers. It continued to expand, and became a public company in 1972, but then went private again after a leveraged buyout in 1985. It was owned by the co-founder and chairman Leandro Rizzuto until his death in 2017.

Conair is one of the largest producers of hair care appliances, ranging from hair dryers and styling irons to its innovative hair curlers, Curl Secret and Miracurl Stylers. In 1995, BaByliss was acquired by the Conair Corporation. The BaByliss brand was created by the hairstylists René Lelièvre and Roger Lemoine, working in Paris in the early 1960s. Lelièvre innovated on the early curling tong, and marketed his products for professional hair stylists.

The company also manufactures a wide range of home kitchen appliances under its brands Cuisinart and Waring.

In 2002 Rizzuto pleaded guilty to tax evasion associated with his tenure as chief executive officer of Conair, and was sentenced to a prison term of 20 to 37 months.

Conair acquired Cuisinart in 1989, Waring Products in 1998, and bag manufacturer Allegro in 2007. Pollenex was acquired after Jarden acquired Holmes in 2005, and it was rebranded as Conair Home in 2013.

In 2019, Transom Capital Group announced it has acquired Conair Corporation's professional liquids division, which will be renamed to Beauty Quest Group.

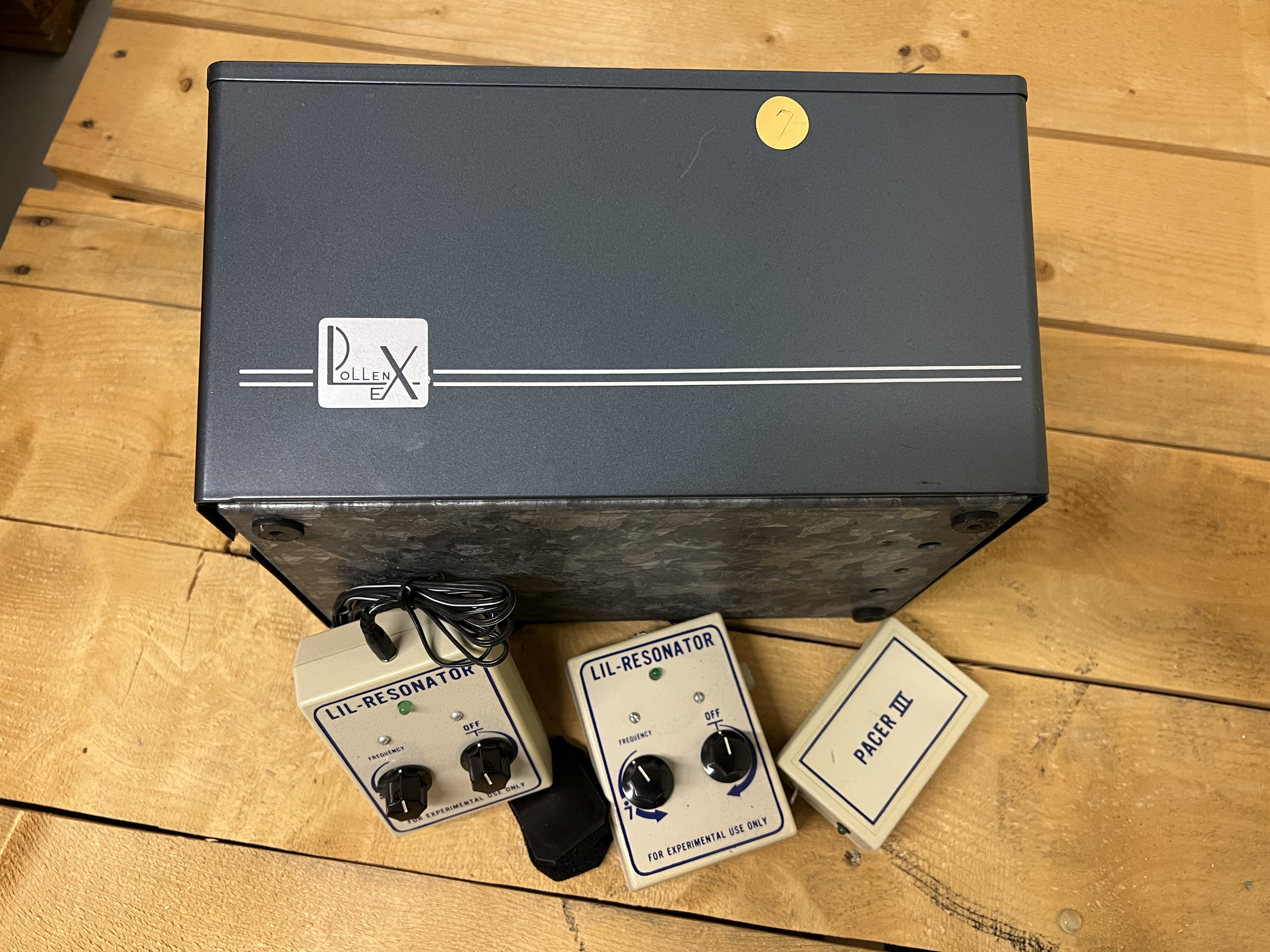
Pollenex machine

== Brands ==
Representative brands by division include:

=== Hair and Beauty Accessories ===
- Scünci
- Conair
- Allegro
- BaByliss

=== Professional Products ===
- BaBylissPRO
- Barberology
- ConairPRO
- Leandro Limited
- ConairPRO Pet

=== Cuisinart ===
- Cuisinart
- Griddler
- AirFryer
- Cuisinart Elite
- Cuisinart Advantage
- Chef's Classic
- Green Gourmet

=== Waring Commercial Products ===
- Waring Commercial
- XPrep
- Bolt
- Café Deco

=== Conair Hospitality ===
- Stay by Cuisinart
- Luna by Conair

=== Subsidiaries ===
Conair sells products in over 100 countries and has offices and subsidiaries in over 12 countries including Babyliss SARL in Paris, France.
