= Tayshia Adams =

American television personality

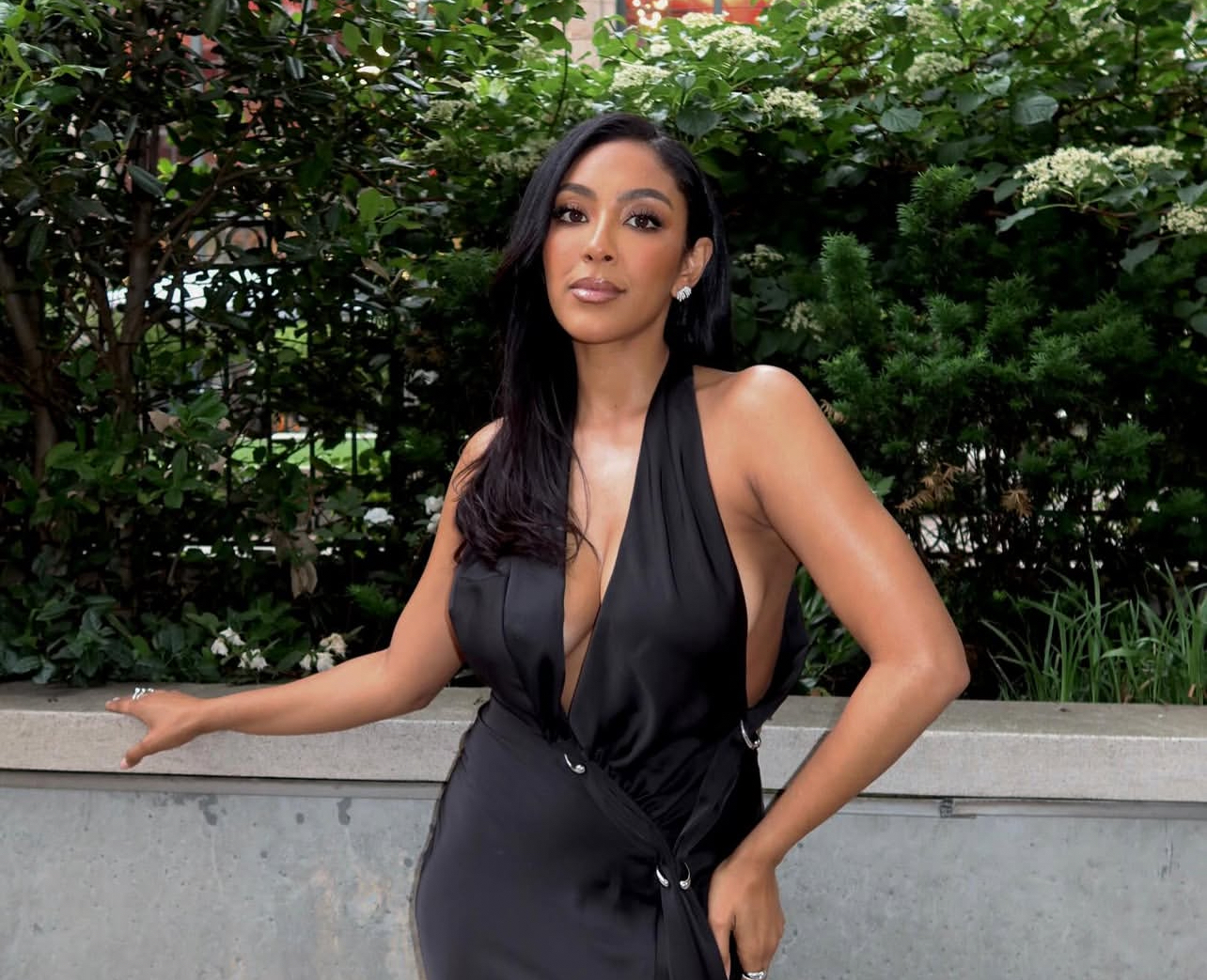
- Born: September 4, 1990 (age 35); Santa Ana, California, U.S.
- Education: Concordia University Irvine (BS)
- Occupations: Television personality, host
- Spouse: Josh Bourelle (m. 2015; div. 2017)

Tayshia Adams (born September 4, 1990) is an American television personality and television host. She received national recognition after appearing as a contestant on season 23 of The Bachelor and the sixth season of Bachelor in Paradise. On November 5, 2020, Adams replaced Clare Crawley as the Bachelorette on season 16 of The Bachelorette. Adams co-hosted The Bachelorette season 17 and 18.

== Early life and education ==
Adams was born raised in Santa Ana, California by her parents Desmond and Rosario Adams. Her father is African-American and her mother is Mexican; Adams identifies as biracial. She has three siblings and was a Girl Scout for 12 years. Adams graduated from Rosary Academy in 2008, and then from Concordia University Irvine in 2012 with a bachelor's degree in biology. During her first week of college in 2008, she was run over by a truck, saying: "I had to relearn how to walk in the hospital and missed about two and a half, three months of school. After about two years, I finally got to the point where I could walk 'normally' and not have chronic pain when I sat down." In 2011, Adams was hit by a distracted driver on the highway and she suffered from chronic pain for five years after the accident. Adams credits physical therapy for her recovery.

In addition to being a reality television personality, Adams is also a former phlebotomist.

== Career ==
Adams has gained a large social media following on Instagram. Adams is an influencer and has shared messages and advertisements on social media for various companies such as car manufacturer Hyundai, deodorant brand Secret and hair care brand Conair. She is an ambassador for several brands, including Maybelline and Fabletics.

=== Fashion and beauty ===
In October 2021, Adams launched a clothing collection with Amaryllis Apparel called "Amaryllis x Tayshia". The collection consists of 17 pieces, including tops, skirts, jackets, jeans and blouses. The collection was designed for "the girl on the go" and was priced between $39.99 and $149.99. On March 8, 2022, she announced her partnership with athletics brand Asics. In September 2022, Adams teamed up with Conair and Scünci and created a collection of hair accessories and tools sold at Walmart. The collection called "Tayshia by Conair", consists of 33 hair accessories, five hair brushes and combs, five hair tools and one mirror.

Adams has graced the covers of numerous luxury lifestyle and fashion magazines such as Modeliste and Locale. She has also appeared in pictorials for Cosmopolitan, Marie Claire and Women's Health.

List of fashion and beauty lines by Tayshia Adams
Year	Title	Brand	Notes
2021	"Amaryllis x Tayshia"	Amaryllis Apparel	Clothing collection
2022	"Tayshia x Conair"	Conair	Hair accessories and tools collection

=== Television ===
Adams was a guest co-host on E! Daily Pop from March 24 to March 30, 2022. Adams hosted the MTV Movie & TV Awards: Unscripted award show on June 5, 2022. On July 31, 2022, she competed against Matt James on game show The $100,000 Pyramid. In March 2023, she co-hosted Live From E!: Oscars After Party special.

In May 2023, it was announced that Adams will appear in Amazon Freevee's upcoming competition series, The Goat. The show followed fan favorite reality television personalities going through a series of mental, physical, and social challenges, and only one will win a cash prize. The series premiered on May 9, 2024. She was the second contestant to be voted off the competition. In her first acting role, Adams played the role of Influencer in Max's political drama series The Girls on the Bus. On October 14, 2025, Variety announced that Adams will be a judge on HGTV's new renovation series Bachelor Mansion Takeover.

==== The Bachelor ====
Adams made her debut in The Bachelor franchise in 2019 when she appeared on Colton Underwood's season of The Bachelor. Adams was one of the final two contestants, alongside Hannah Godwin, both of whom were eliminated when Underwood decided to end the show to pursue Cassie Randolph.

==== Bachelor in Paradise ====
After her elimination from The Bachelor, Adams appeared on season six of Bachelor in Paradise in August 2019, where she started dating fellow contestant John Paul Jones. The two split in September 2019, prior to the show's finale. After the finale, Adams and Jones rekindled their relationship when she traveled to Saint Michaels, Maryland, to "see if he would be willing to give their relationship another chance." They dated for a few weeks before ending their relationship again in late October 2019.

==== The Bachelorette ====
In 2020, Adams was chosen as the replacement for Clare Crawley on season 16 of The Bachelorette after Crawley's exit, making this the first American Bachelorette season to have its lead replaced. In the season finale, Adams chose Zac Clark, an addiction specialist from New Jersey, over runner-up Ben Smith, and the couple became engaged to marry.

On March 13, 2021, it was announced that Adams will co-host season 17 of The Bachelorette alongside fellow former Bachelorette Kaitlyn Bristowe. On May 17, 2021, Adams accepted the award for "Best Dating Show" on The Bachelorette's behalf at the MTV Movie & TV Awards: Unscripted ceremony. In June 2021, Marie Claire called her "a longtime Bachelor Nation fan favorite." In 2021, Adams hosted two podcasts, Bachelor Happy Hour and Click Bait with Bachelor Nation. After a successful run co-hosting The Bachelorette Season 17, "Adams and Bristowe have received a warm reception as co-hosts, garnering positive feedback from Bachelor Nation on social media," leading to Adams being announced as the co-host for The Bachelorette season 18 with a multi-year option to extend beyond the two seasons she has co-hosted of The Bachelorette franchise this far. In January 2022, Adams was replaced by Tia Booth as the co-host of Click Bait with Bachelor Nation podcast.

== Philanthropy ==
She works in partnership with Christian humanitarian organization World Vision. She sponsors two children in Kenya and Honduras via World Vision. In 2022, she traveled to Moldova to visit Ukrainian refugees. In December 2022, Adams created "All Things Possible" crossbody purse for World Vision to raise money for people at risk due to the Russian invasion of Ukraine.

In 2023, Adams volunteered for Feeding America on Thanksgiving at the Urban Outreach Center in New York City.

== Personal life ==
In 2015, Adams married Josh Bourelle; they divorced in 2017. In 2020, after meeting on The Bachelorette, she became engaged to Zac Clark. The couple broke up in November 2021.

Her interests include real estate, architecture and interior design. In 2024, she completed her second New York City Marathon.

== Filmography ==
=== As actress ===
Television
Year	Title	Role	Notes
2024	The Girls on the Bus	Influencer	Episode: "The Everydays"

=== As herself ===
Television
Year	Title	Role	Notes
2019	The Bachelor	Contestant	Contestant on season 23; 10 episodes
2019	Bachelor in Paradise	Contestant	Contestant on season 6; 13 episodes
2020	American Music Awards	Presenter	Television special
2020–2022	Entertainment Tonight	Guest and guest co-host	6 episodes
2020–2021	The Bachelorette	Lead and co-host	The Bachelorette (season 16); Co-host (seasons 17–18)
2021	MTV Movie & TV Awards: Unscripted	Presenter	Television special
2022	E! Daily Pop	Guest co-host	March 24, 2022–30, 2022
2022	MTV Movie & TV Awards: Unscripted	Host	Television special
2022	The $100,000 Pyramid	Celebrity player	Episode: "Tayshia Adams vs Matt James and Wendi McLendon-Covey vs Thomas Lennon"
2023	Live from E!: Oscar’s Afterparty	Co-host	Television special
2023	The Real Housewives of Atlanta	Guest appearance	Episode: "Keeping it Gucci"
2024	The Goat	Contestant	Contestant on season 1; 3 episodes
2026	Bachelor Mansion Takeover	Judge	6 episodes

Podcasts
Year	Title	Role	Notes
2020–2021	Click Bait with Bachelor Nation	Host	66 episodes
2021	Bachelor Happy Hour	Host	26 episodes

Preceded by Clare Crawley	The Bachelorette; Season 16	Succeeded by Katie Thurston
