= Clare Crawley =

American television personality

- Born: Clare Crawley; March 20, 1981 (age 44); Sacramento, California, U.S.
- Occupation: Television personality
- Spouse: Ryan Dawkins (m. 2023)
- Children: 1

Clare Dawkins (née Crawley) (born March 20, 1981) is an American television personality, best known for her role as the runner-up on the 18th season of ABC's The Bachelor and as the lead of the 16th season of The Bachelorette. She also appeared on seasons 1 and 2 of Bachelor in Paradise, and on Bachelor Winter Games.

== Early life ==
Crawley was born in Sacramento, California and is the youngest of six sisters. She is of Mexican descent on her mother's side. Her father died from brain cancer in 2004. Crawley also completed hairstylist training while growing up in Sacramento, California.

== Television career ==
=== The Bachelor ===
Crawley first appeared as a contestant on Juan Pablo Galavis's season of The Bachelor, where she made it to the final two but was rejected in favor of fellow contestant Nikki Ferrell. During her time on The Bachelor, she and Galavis went out at night to swim in the ocean together, which Galavis later called a mistake as he did not want to set a bad example for his daughter. After Galavis rejected her, Crawley called him out for the inappropriate language he used regarding their time together, which was met with widespread praise by viewers.

=== Bachelor in Paradise ===
After The Bachelor, Crawley appeared on the first two seasons of Bachelor in Paradise; however, she was unsuccessful in finding love and left voluntarily on both seasons.

=== Bachelor Winter Games ===
Crawley returned for The Bachelor Winter Games, where she was involved in a love triangle with Christian Rauch and Benoit Beauséjour-Savard. Although Crawley left alone, the reunion special on February 22, 2018, revealed she and Beauséjour-Savard had gotten back together offscreen. Beauséjour-Savard proposed to Crawley on stage, and she accepted. On April 6, 2018, the couple revealed they had broken up.

=== The Bachelorette ===
Crawley was announced as The Bachelorette on March 2, 2020, on Good Morning America. This appearance makes her the oldest Bachelorette in the show's history, taking over from Rachel Lindsay who was 32 on her season.

== Personal life ==
Outside of her work on television, Crawley is a hairstylist at De Facto Salon in Sacramento, California. She got engaged to Dale Moss during the 16th season of The Bachelorette. They announced their breakup on January 19, 2021, but reunited a month later. They broke up for good in September 2021.

On October 10, 2022, it was reported that Crawley got engaged to Ryan Dawkins, her boyfriend of 1 year, over the weekend in Las Vegas. They married on February 1, 2023, in Sacramento. Crawley became a stepmother to Dawkins' two daughters from his previous marriage. In January 2024, the couple welcomed their first child together, a daughter, via surrogate.

== Filmography ==
Television
Year	Title	Role	Notes
2011–2015	Bachelor in Paradise	Contestant	Contestant on season 1 and 2; 12 episodes
2014–2022	The Bachelor	Various roles	Contestant on season 18; 16 episodes
2014–2020	The Bachelorette	Herself	The Bachelorette on season 16
2016	Who Wants to Be a Millionaire	Contestant	Episode: "Bachelor Fan Favorites 4"
2018	The Bachelor Winter Games	Contestant	4 episodes
2020–2021	Entertainment Tonight	Guest and guest co-host	5 episodes

Preceded by Lindsay Yenter	The Bachelor runner up Season 18	Succeeded by Becca Tilley
Preceded by Hannah Brown	The Bachelorette; Season 16	Succeeded by Tayshia Adams
