= The Bachelor (franchise) =

Reality television franchise

- Created by: Mike Fleiss
- Original work: The Bachelor (United States)
- Owners: Warner Bros. Entertainment (Skydance)
- Years: 2002–present

Films and television
- Television series: The Bachelor (see international versions)

Miscellaneous
- Genre: Dating game show
- First aired: March 25, 2002; 24 years ago
- Distributor: Warner Bros. Television Studios

Official website
- BachelorNation.com

The Bachelor is an American romance and relationship multimedia franchise which began with the reality television series The Bachelor in 2002 and now includes multiple spin-off television series, a podcast network, a website, live tour, and more.

The franchise has been financially successful, bringing in $86 million in advertising revenue alone in 2017.

== Television series ==
=== The Bachelor (2002–present) ===
The Bachelor revolves around a single bachelor who begins with a pool of romantic interests from whom he is expected to select a wife. During the course of the season, the bachelor goes on group and one-on-one dates to get to know the candidates, and eliminates some of them each week, eventually culminating in a marriage proposal to his final selection.

=== The Bachelorette (2003–present) ===
Following the success of The Bachelor, creator Mike Fleiss produced The Bachelorette, in which the format is gender-reversed. The bachelorettes are often eliminated contestants from The Bachelor. Season 11 of The Bachelorette had two bachelorettes (but only for the first episode). Season 16 had two bachelorettes (one for the first half of the season, the other the rest of the season). Season 19 had two bachelorettes for the whole season.

=== Bachelor Pad (2010–2012) ===
Bachelor Pad premiered in August 2010, giving previous contestants of both The Bachelor and The Bachelorette an opportunity to compete in dating-themed eliminations for $250,000. This summer series lasted three seasons.

=== Bachelor in Paradise (2014–present) ===
Bachelor in Paradise premiered on August 4, 2014, giving previous contestants of both The Bachelor and The Bachelorette the opportunity to compete for another chance in love in dating-themed eliminations.

=== Bachelor in Paradise: After Paradise (2015–2016) ===
Bachelor in Paradise: After Paradise premiered on August 3, 2015 and was a live, weekly talk show that features cast of the series and celebrity fans discussing the most recent episodes of Bachelor in Paradise. The series also featured questions from the audience, deleted scenes, outtakes and exclusive extra content. The talk show was hosted by Michelle Collins and co-hosted by Sean Lowe.

=== Bachelor Live (2016) ===
Bachelor Live premiered on January 4, 2016, and was a one-hour talk show hosted by Chris Harrison which aired directly after The Bachelor.

=== Ben and Lauren: Happily Ever After? (2016) ===
First airing in October 2016 on Freeform, Ben and Lauren: Happily Ever After? showcased the relationship of Ben Higgins and Lauren Bushnell following season 20 of The Bachelor on their plans for marriage and Bushnell's new life in Denver. The couple eventually parted ways in May 15, 2017.

=== The Twins: Happily Ever After (2017) ===
On March 20, 2017, The Twins: Happily Ever After premiered on Freeform. The series stars Haley and Emily Ferguson from season 20 of The Bachelor and showcases them "saying goodbye to the comfort and luxuries of living under their mom's roof and beginning the hilarious journey of figuring out life on their own while searching for independence and a new career."

=== The Bachelor: Winter Games (2018) ===
The Bachelor Winter Games premiered on February 13, 2018. The show follows a similar premise to that of Bachelor in Paradise with a few twists. One stand out twist is that the cast is made up of international contestants from The Bachelor franchise. All contestants participate in various winter sports in order to win a date card. Ashley Iaconetti (American) and Kevin Wendt (Canadian) were the winning couple of the first season, after competing in an ice skating dance routine against three other couples.

=== The Bachelor Presents: Listen to Your Heart (2020) ===
The Bachelor Presents: Listen to Your Heart premiered on April 13, 2020. follows single men and women, who are musicians or work in the music industry, hoping to find love through music. The contestants will sing well-known songs, both individually and as couples, and explore their relationships while living together and going on Bachelor-style dates that focus on music.

=== The Bachelor: The Greatest Seasons – Ever! (2020) ===
On April 29, 2020, a 10-episode documentary series titled The Bachelor: The Greatest Seasons – Ever! was announced. It premiered on June 8, 2020. It was originally titled The Bachelor: The Most Unforgettable—Ever! before its name was changed on May 11, 2020. The series contains recaps of previous seasons of The Bachelor and The Bachelorette and features interviews with former cast members. It is hosted by Chris Harrison.

=== The Golden Bachelor (2023) ===
In January 2020, a casting call was issued for men and women aged 65 and older, for an edition of The Bachelor starring senior citizens. On May 16, 2023, after a 3-year-delay due to the COVID-19 pandemic, ABC commissioned the first season of The Golden Bachelor, to premiere in Fall 2023.

=== Wedding specials ===
The weddings of Trista Rehn (the 1st Bachelorette), Jason Mesnick (13th Bachelor), Ashley Hebert (the 7th Bachelorette), and Sean Lowe (the 17th Bachelor) were broadcast as television specials. Rehn's vow-renewal ceremony upon her 10-year anniversary was also broadcast. Bachelor in Paradise season 2 couple Jade Roper and Tanner Tolbert's wedding was also broadcast as a television special in February 2016. In addition, the inaugural couple from Golden Bachelor, Gerry Turner and Theresa Nist, aired their wedding as a live special, The Golden Wedding, in January 2024.

=== Canceled spin-offs ===
In 2020, ABC announced plans to produce a summer counterpart of The Bachelor Winter Games, which would have presumably aired against the 2020 Summer Olympics (just as Winter Games aired against the Winter Olympics). On March 30, 2020, due to the COVID-19 pandemic (which itself caused the 2020 Olympics to be postponed to 2021), it was reported that production of the spin-off had been cancelled.

== In other media ==
=== Live show ===
The Bachelor Live On Stage was announced on January 23, 2019 during the Men Tell All episode. A local Bachelor would go through group date challenges and coveted one-on-ones with local ladies in the audience. Audience members and hosts would assist the Bachelor. Ben Higgins and Becca Kufrin are slated to host the 63 stop tour starting in Mesa, Arizona on February 13, 2020 with the final stop in Austin, Texas, was scheduled on May 17, 2020. However due to the COVID-19 pandemic, half of the shows have been postponed and they were rescheduled to January 24, 2021 in Cleveland, Ohio.

=== Podcast ===
Bachelor Happy Hour is a podcast series hosted by Joe Amabile and Serena Pitt. It was originally hosted by Rachel Lindsay and Ali Fedotowsky. It premiered on July 19, 2020 and features weekly guests from various Bachelor Nation shows.

=== Digital series ===
The franchise has launched numerous digital series featuring cast members from the various television shows.

==== Meet and Greet ====
One-on-one interviews with cast members not shown in the television shows.

==== Bachelor Happy Hour: Open Bar ====
Expanded video version of the podcast Bachelor Happy Hour.

==== Bachelor Nation Encore ====
Deleted and extended scenes not seen in the television show.

==== Will You Accept This Ride? ====
Interview series where YouTube creator Lisa Schwartz interviews various cast members in the back of a limo.

==== Bad Chiller ====
Comedic recap show featuring Nick Viall.

=== Video game ===
The Bachelor: The Videogame was released in 2010 for Nintendo Wii and Nintendo DS. It gives players the opportunity to compete in a series of dates inspired by the television show.

Critical reaction to the game was negative.

== International versions ==
=== The Bachelor ===
Currently airing franchise
Franchise with an upcoming season
Franchise no longer aired
Status unknown

Country	Name	Host	Network	Bachelor(s) and Winner(s)	Date premiered
Africa	The Bachelor Afrique	Emma Lohoues	Canal+ Afrique		October 15, 2022
Albania	Love Story	Alketa Vejsiu	TV Klan		November 16, 2020
Australia	The Bachelor Australia	Osher Günsberg	Network Ten	Season 1, 2013: Tim Robards, Anna Heinrich; Season 2, 2014: Blake Garvey, Sam Frost; Season 3, 2015: Sam Wood, Snezana Markoski; Season 4, 2016: Richie Strahan, Alex Nation; Season 5, 2017: Matty Johnson, Laura Byrne; Season 6, 2018: Nick Cummins, no winner; Season 7, 2019: Matt Agnew, Chelsie McLeod; Season 8, 2020: Locky Gilbert, Irena Srbinovska; Season 9, 2021: Jimmy Nicholson, Holly Kingston; Season 10, Summer 2023: Felix Van Hofe, Jessica Navin; Jed McIntosh, Alésia Delaney; and Thomas Malucelli, Leah Cummings; Season 11, Spring 2023: Ben Waddell, McKenna Lea; Luke Bateman, Ellie Rolfe; and Wesley Cortes, Brea Marshall	September 8, 2013
Belgium (Flanders)	De Bachelor	Goedele Liekens	Play4		February 9, 2022
Bosnia and Herzegovina	Gospodin Savršeni	Marko Vargek	Voyo		January 26, 2026
Brazil	The Bachelor	Fábio Arruda	RedeTV!	Season 1, 2014: Gianluca Perino, Aane Doux	November 21, 2014
Bulgaria	Ергенът; The Bachelor	Naum Shopov (1–5)	bTV	Season 1, 2022: Viktor Stoyanov; Season 2, 2023: Evgeni Genchev; Season 3, 2024: Aleksandar Mladenov; Season 4, 2025: Viktor Rusinov; Martin Nikolov–Elvisa; Vasil Penev; Season 5, 2026: Kristian Genchev; Marin Stanev; Stoyan Dimov; Georgi Gatev	February 19, 2022
Canada	The Bachelor Canada	Tyler Harcott	City	Season 1, 2012: Brad Smith, Bianka Kamber; Season 2, 2014: Tim Warmels, April Brockman; Season 3, 2017: Chris Leroux, Mikaela Wightman	October 3, 2012
China	The Bachelor (黄金单身汉）	Qiu Qiming	Mango TV		October 1, 2016
Croatia	Gospodin Savršeni	Antonija Blaće (1–4); Marko Vargek (5–)	RTL Televizija	Season 1, 2018: Goran Juranec, Hana Rodić; Season 2, 2019: Mijo Matić, Nuša Rojs; Season 3, 2022: Toni Šćulac, Stankica Stojanović; Season 4, 2025: Šime Elez, Vanja Stanojević; and Miloš Mičović, Maida Ribić; Season 5, 2026: Karlo Godez, Anastasia Kaleb; and Petar Rašić, Kaja Casar	November 19, 2018
Czech Republic	Vem si mě – The Bachelor	Mário Kubec	TV Nova	Season 1, 2007: Michal Červín, Krásná Barbara	September 9, 2007
Czech Republic	Bachelor Česko	Zorka Hejdová	TV Nova	Season 1, 2024-25:Jan Solfronk, Sabina Pšádová; Season 2, 2025-26: Míra Dubovický, Sarah Vu; and Martin Dubovický, Pavla Vaníčková	November 12, 2024
Denmark	Bachelor	Petra Nagel	TV2 Play		May 25, 2021
Finland	Suomen unelmien poikamies	Sami Kuronen	Nelonen		February 2008
Finland	Bachelor Suomi		Nelonen		March 14, 2016
Finland	Bachelor Suomi	Mikko Parikka	MTV3		March 1, 2022
France	Bachelor, le gentleman célibataire	Stéphane Rotenberg (2003–2005); Grégory Ascher (2013–2014); Boris Ehrgott (2016)	M6 (2003–05); NT1 (2013–16)		May 7, 2003
Germany	Der Bachelor	Arne Jessen (2003–04); None (2012–)	RTL	Season 1, 2003–04: Marcel Maderitsch, Juliane Zieger; Season 2, 2012: Paul Janke, Anja Polzer; Season 3, 2013: Jan Kralitschka, Alissa Harouat; Season 4, 2014: Christian Tews, Katja Kühne; Season 5, 2015: Oliver Sanne, Liz Kaeber; Season 6, 2016: Leonard Freier, Leonie Pump; Season 7, 2017: Sebastian Pannek, Clea-Lacy Juhn; Season 8, 2018: Daniel Völz, Kristina Yantsen; Season 9, 2019: Andrej Mangold, Jennifer Lange; Season 10, 2020: Sebastian Preuss, no winner; Season 11, 2021: Niko Griesert, Michelle Gwozdz; Season 12, 2022: Dominik Stuckmann, Anna Rossow; Season 13, 2023: David Jackson, Angelika Utzeri; Season 14, 2024: Dennis Gries, Katharina Geretschuchin; and Sebaastian Klaus, Larissa Schulte; Season 15, 2025: Martin Braun, Clara Heinrich; and Felix Stein, Seyma Ak; Season 16, 2026: Sebastian Paul, Nadja; and Tim Reitz, Vivien Grabarits Lorenzo; Season 17, 2027: Upcoming season	November 19, 2003; January 4, 2011
Greece; Cyprus	The Bachelor	George Satsidis	Alpha TV	Season 1, 2020: Panagiotis Vasilakos, Nicoletta Tsompanidou; Season 2, 2021: Alexis Pappas, Athena Vas	September 10, 2020
Hungary	A Nagy Ő	László Szarvas (1–2); András Stohl (3); Ramóna Lékai-Kiss (4–)	TV2		September 9, 2003
India, State of Tamil Nadu	எங்க வீட்டு மாப்பிள்ளை Enga Veetu Mapillai	Sangeetha Krish	Colors Tamil		February 20, 2018
India, State of Kerala	Aryakku Parinayam	Sangeetha Krish	Flowers TV		February 26, 2018
Indonesia (Note: Originally, the Indonesian show, The Bachelor Indonesia was set to air on NET. based on The Bachelor, Warner Bros. Television deals with the format of the show in collaboration with distribution and production in Indonesia through PT Dunia Visitama Produksi, known under the name Fremantle for the Indonesian version. However, this show was canceled for an unknown reason. Finally, the show was confirmed to be aired on HBO Asia.)	The Bachelor Indonesia	Oka Antara	HBO Asia		February 10, 2023
Israel	הרווק; HaRavak	Guy Geyor	Channel 10		December 2009
Italy	The Bachelor – L'uomo dei sogni	Cristina Parodi	Canale 5		June 26, 2003
Japan	バチェラー・ジャパン; The Bachelor Japan	Koji Imada (1–4); Shingo Fujimori (2–4); Rino Sashihara (2–4)	Amazon Prime Video		February 17, 2017
New Zealand	The Bachelor New Zealand	Mike Puru	TV3	Season 1, 2015: Art Green, Matilda Rice; Season 2, 2016: Jordan Mauger, Fleur Verhoeven; Season 3, 2017: Zac Franich, Viarni Bright; Season 4, 2021: Moses Mackay, Annie Theis	March 17, 2015
Norway	Ungkaren	Christopher Dons	TVNorge		September 1, 2003
Poland	Kawaler do wzięcia	Krzysztof Banaszyk	TVN		October 8, 2003
Romania	Burlacul	Lucian Marinescu (1); Cătălin Botezatu (2–4); Andreea Mantea (5); Răzvan Fodor (6)	Antena 1	Season 1, 2010: Cătălin Botezatu, Violeta Babiluc; Season 2, 2011: Eduard Popescu Strohlen, Ana Maria Savu; Season 3, 2012: Sergiu Barboni, Adelina Boe; Season 4, 2013: Bogdan Vlădău, Daciana Ciochina; Season 5, 2015: Andrei Andrei, no winner; Season 6, 2016: Andy Constantin, Ana Bene	June 8, 2010
Russia	Холостяк; Holostyak	Pyotr Fadeyev (2013–2020); Nikita Dobrynin (2021); Mikhail Belyanin (2021–2022)	TNT	Season 1, 2013: Evgeny Levchenko, Olesya Ermakova; Season 2, 2014: Maxim Chernyavsky, Maria Drigola; Season 3, 2015: Timur Batrutdinov, Darya Kananukha; Season 4, 2016: Alexey Vorobyov, no winner; Season 5, 2017: Ilya Glinnikov, Ekaterina Nikulina; Season 6, 2019: Egor Kreed, Darya Klyukina; Season 7, 2020: Anton Krivorotov, Barbara Pino; Season 8, 2021: Timati, Ekaterina Safarova; Season 9, 2022: Alexander Grankov, Yana Sapeta; and Dimash Adilet, Sonya Solmanidina	March 10, 2013
Serbia	Mladoženja	Katarina Sismanovic	B92/or TV Prva		2026
Slovakia	Nevesta pre milionára	Viliam Rozboril	TV Markíza		April 28, 2006
Slovakia	Ruža pre nevestu	Krištof Králik	TV Markíza	Season 1: Tomáš Tarr, Petrana Galatea Oráčová; Season 2: Radko Urbaniak, Stanislava Lučková; Season 3: Rasťo Zvara, Karolína Michalčíková; Season 4: Adrian Chabada,in progress	March 3, 2023
Slovenia	Sanjski moški	Peter Poles (2021); Nejc Šmit (2022)	POP TV		September 24, 2004
South Africa	The Bachelor SA	Jason Greer	M-Net		February 14, 2019
Sweden	Bachelor – När leken blir allvar	Malin Stenbäck (2015–2022); Amie Bramme Sey (2024–)	TV4		October 6, 2015
Switzerland	Der Bachelor		3 Plus TV		October 30, 2012
Thailand	The Bachelor Thailand ศึกรัก...สละโสด; The Bachelor Thailand (Bachelor...Battle of Love)	Natpawin Kulkanlayadee	ONE		August 27, 2016
Ukraine	Холостяк; Holostyak	Current Hryhoriy Reshetnyk (2–); Former Ivan Gorodetsky (1)	STB	Season 1, 2011: Maksym Chmerkovsky, Oleksandra Shulhina; Season 2, 2012: Francis Alexander Matthew Romanov, Olena Riasnova; Season 3, 2013: Andrii Iskornev, Aniuta Kozyr; Season 4, 2014: Konstiantyn Yevtushenko, Anna Seliukova; Season 5, 2015: Serhii Melnyk, Maryna Kishchuk; Season 6, 2016: Irakli Makatsaria, Olena Lesyk; Season 7, 2017: Dmytro Cherkasov, Lida Nemchenko; Season 8. 2018: Rozhden Anusi, Ivanna Honcharuk; Season 9, 2019: Nikita Dobrynin, Dariia Kvitkova; Season 10, 2020: Maksym Mykhailiuk, Dasha Ulianova; Season 11, 2021: Mykhailo Zalivako, Anna Bohdan; Season 12, 2022–23: Alex Topolskyi, Kateryna Lozovytska; Season 13, 2024: Oleksandr “Teren” Budko, Inna Bielen; Season 14, 2025: Taras Tsymbalyuk, Current season	March 17, 2011
United Kingdom	The Bachelor	Jeremy Milnes (2003–05); Hugo Speer (2011–12); Mark Wright (2019)	BBC Three (2003–05); Channel 5 (2011–12, 2019)	Series 1, 2003: David Donald, no winner; Series 2, 2004: Jamie Williams, Jodi Plumb; Series 3, 2005: Anthony Thomas, Lindsay Mann; Series 4, 2011: Gavin Henson, Carianne Barrow; Series 5, 2012: Spencer Matthews, Khloe Evans; Series 6, 2019: Alex Marks, Alicia Oates	March 30, 2003; August 19, 2011; March 4, 2019
United States (Note: Expatriates are living in the United States were eligible to apply for the American series unless if they establish a permanent residency.) (Canada) (Note: Starting from the 4th season, Canadians were eligible to apply for the American series.)	The Bachelor	Chris Harrison (2002–21); Jesse Palmer (2022–)	ABC	Season 1, Spring 2002: Alex Michel, Amanda Marsh; Season 2, Fall 2002: Aaron Buerge, Helene Estrokowicz; Season 3, Spring 2003: Andrew Firestone, Jennifer Schefft; Season 4, Fall 2003: Bob Guiney, Estella Gardinier; Season 5, Spring 2004: Jesse Palmer, Jessica Bowlin; Season 6, Fall 2004: Byron Velvick, Mary Delgado; Season 7, 2005: Charlie O'Connell, Sarah Brice; Season 8, Winter 2006: Travis Stork, Sarah Stone; Season 9, Fall 2006: Lorenzo Borghese, Jennifer Wilson; Season 10, Spring 2007: Andy Baldwin, Tessa Horst; Season 11, Fall 2007: Brad Womack, no winner; Season 12, 2008: Matt Grant, Shayne Lamas; Season 13, 2009: Jason Mesnick, Melissa Rycroft; Season 14, 2010: Jake Pavelka, Vienna Girardi; Season 15, 2011: Brad Womack, Emily Maynard; Season 16, 2012: Ben Flajnik, Courtney Robertson; Season 17, 2013: Sean Lowe, Catherine Giudici; Season 18, 2014: Juan Pablo Galavis, Nikki Ferrell; Season 19, 2015: Chris Soules, Whitney Bischoff; Season 20, 2016: Ben Higgins, Lauren Bushnell; Season 21, 2017: Nick Viall, Vanessa Grimaldi; Season 22, 2018: Arie Luyendyk Jr., Becca Kufrin; Season 23, 2019: Colton Underwood, Cassie Randolph; Season 24, 2020: Peter Weber, Hannah Ann Sluss; Season 25, 2021: Matt James, Rachael Kirkconnell; Season 26, 2022: Clayton Echard, Susie Evans; Season 27, 2023: Zach Shallcross, Kaitlyn "Kaity" Biggar; Season 28, 2024: Joey Graziadei, Kelsey Anderson; Season 29, 2025: Grant Ellis, Juliana Pasquarosa; Season 30, 2027: Sam Hartman, Upcoming season	March 25, 2002
Vietnam	The Bachelor Vietnam – Anh chàng độc thân	Khôi Trần	HTV7	Season 1, 2018: Nguyễn Quốc Trung, Bùi Thùy Dương	August 14, 2018

=== The Bachelorette ===
Country	Name	Host	Network	Date premiered
Australia	The Bachelorette Australia	Osher Günsberg	Network Ten	September 23, 2015
Belgium (Flanders)	De Bachelorette	Dominique Van Malder	Play4	February 18, 2021
Canada	The Bachelorette Canada	Noah Cappe	W Network	September 13, 2016
Denmark	Drømmekvinden		TV Danmark	September 12, 2004
Estonia	Vallaline kaunitar	Elina Born	TV3	October 7, 2022
Finland	Bachelorette Suomi		Nelonen	October 1, 2018
Germany	Die Bachelorette	none	RTL	November 24, 2004
Hungary	A Nagy Ő	László Szarvas	TV2	March 9, 2004
India	The Bachelorette India	Rohit Roy	Life OK	October 23, 2013
Japan	バチェロレッテ・ジャパン; The Bachelorette Japan	Takashi Okamura, Hiroyuki Yabe, Shelly	Amazon Prime Video	October 9, 2020
New Zealand	The Bachelorette New Zealand	Art Green	TVNZ 2	January 27, 2020
Romania	Burlăcița	Cătălin Botezatu (Season 1); Bogdan Vlădău (Season 2); Radu Vălcan (Season 3)	Antena 1	July 7, 2011
Slovenia	Sanjska ženska		POP TV	1st season: 2005; 2nd season: 2006
Spain	Para toda la vida. The Bachelorette	Jesús Vázquez	Telecinco / Cuatro	December 12, 2022
Sweden	Bachelorette Sverige		TV3	March 27, 2011
Sweden	Bachelorette Sverige	Malin Stenbäck	TV4	November 15, 2021
Switzerland	Die Bachelorette		3+	April 27, 2015
Ukraine	Холостячка; Holostyachka	Hryhoriy Reshetnyk	STB	October 23, 2020
United States	The Bachelorette	Chris Harrison (Seasons 1–16); Kaitlyn Bristowe & Tayshia Adams (Seasons 17 & 18); Jesse Palmer (Season 19-)	ABC	January 8, 2003

=== Bachelor in Paradise ===
Country	Name	Host	Network	Date premiered
Australia	Bachelor in Paradise	Osher Günsberg	Network Ten	March 25, 2018
Bulgaria	Ергенът: Любов в Рая	Rayna Karayaneva	bTV	September 1, 2025
Canada	Bachelor in Paradise Canada	Jesse Jones (Season 1); Sharleen Joynt (Season 2-)	Citytv	October 10, 2021
Germany	Bachelor in Paradise	none	RTL	May 9, 2018
Romania	Burlacii: Foc în Paradis	TBA	Pro TV	2026
Sweden	Bachelor in Paradise	Malin Stenbäck (Season 1); Hanna Friberg (Season 2-)	TV4	August 21, 2023
United States	Bachelor in Paradise	Chris Harrison (Seasons 1–6); Guest Hosts David Spade, Lance Bass, Tituss Burgess, Lil Jon, Wells Adams (Season 7); Jesse Palmer (Season 8-)	ABC	August 4, 2014

=== The Golden Bachelor ===
Country	Name	Host	Network	Date premiered
United States	The Golden Bachelor	Jesse Palmer	ABC	September 28, 2023
France	Le Golden Bachelor	Stéphane Rotenberg	M6	June 27, 2024
Germany	Der Bachelor	Franz Stärk	RTL	December 3, 2024
Australia	The Golden Bachelor	Samantha Armytage	Nine Network	October 20, 2025

== Cultural impact ==
Cast members featured on the show often gain a large social media following, which in turn creates various sponsorship and employment opportunities once they leave the show. In recent seasons some cast members have been accused of going on the show specifically for this reason, leading to accusations of "being here for the wrong reasons."

The various television series shoot on location in cities around the world, and promotion from these visits has been coined "The Bachelor Effect." Exposure on the shows has led to increased tourism and economic activity in the locations featured.

The franchise inspired the fictional show UnReal, which stars Shiri Appleby as a young reality television producer pushed by her unscrupulous boss (Constance Zimmer) to swallow her integrity and do anything it takes to drum up salacious show content.
