= The Bachelor Canada =

- Genre: Reality competition
- Created by: Mike Fleiss
- Presented by: Tyler Harcott (2012–14); Noah Cappe (2017)
- Country of origin: Canada
- Original language: English
- No. of seasons: 3
- No. of episodes: 30

Production
- Executive producer: Claire Freeland
- Running time: 90 minutes
- Production company: Good Human Productions

Original release
- Network: City (Seasons 1–2); W Network (2017–present)
- Release: October 3, 2012 – December 20, 2017

Related
- The Bachelorette Canada; The Bachelor (American TV series); The Bachelor (British TV series)

The Bachelor Canada is a Canadian reality television series that first premiered on October 3, 2012, and is based on the American television series The Bachelor. Seasons 1 and 2 aired on the City television network, after which point the franchise was picked up by W Network, for its third season.

== Production ==
In 2012 it was first announced that The Bachelor was coming to Canada. The show is produced by Good Human Productions. Filming began in Spring 2012.

=== The Host ===
Originally hosted by Tyler Harcott for the first two seasons, the show is now helmed by Canadian actor and host Noah Cappe.

=== Season 1 Bachelor ===
Brad Smith was born on October 2, 1983, in Hudson, Quebec. His father is Larry Smith, a Canadian Senator, former CFL Commissioner, and former president and CEO of the Montreal Alouettes, and his mother is Leesa Smith. He received a scholarship at St. Andrew's College, and later advanced to Queen's University. During his football career, Brad had several seasons with a variety of teams: Montreal Alouettes, Toronto Argonauts, and the Edmonton Eskimos. Living as a professional athlete, Brad adjusted to living an upbeat and on-the-go lifestyle; however, this meant that he never had the opportunity to seek "true love." This feeling led him to audition for The Bachelor Canada, where he had high hopes of finding love and starting a family.

=== Season 2 Bachelor ===
Born and raised in the small town of Campbellville, Ontario, Tim Warmels attended business school at the University of Western Ontario before moving to Toronto and becoming an investment banker on Bay Street. He now has a number of tech ventures, and enjoys travelling, modeling and building custom furniture in his spare time.

==== Meet the Family crossover ====
In a crossover episode Tim Warmels appeared as himself in the Citytv hidden camera comedy series Meet the Family. In the storyline, the boyfriend (prank victim) was told by his real girlfriend's fake mother that she was having an affair. When Warmels showed up at the door holding roses, the boyfriend did not recognize him, said he'd never watch the show and tried to force him out of the house.

=== Season 3 Bachelor ===
Born in Montreal, Quebec, Chris Leroux moved to Mississauga, Ontario with his parents and brother when he was three years old. He grew up with strong family values and an ingrained passion for sports. Chris’ dad introduced him to baseball when he was young, and with his family’s encouragement and support, he set his sights on the big leagues. With a lot of hard work and perseverance, Chris fulfilled his dream, playing for the New York Yankees, Florida Marlins and Pittsburgh Pirates during his incredible professional career. A laid-back guy with diverse interests that range from surfing to vintage cars to playing the piano, Chris is always ready to try something new.

== Seasons ==
Season	Premiered	Bachelor	Profile	Winner	Runner-up	Proposal	Note
1	October 3, 2012	Brad Smith	Former Canadian Football League (slotback)	Bianka Kamber	Whitney Lee	Yes	Smith and Kamber split after two years.
2	September 18, 2014	Tim Warmels	Entrepreneur	April Brockman	Trisha Vergo	Yes	Warmels and Brockman split in March 2015.
3	October 11, 2017	Chris Leroux	Former Major League Baseball player	Mikaela Wightman	Lyndsey Gavin	No	Leroux and Wightman are no longer together.

== Broadcast ==
Internationally, the series premiered in Australia on November 10, 2015, on LifeStyle You.
