= The Bachelor Canada season 1 =

The Bachelor Canada
- Season 1
- Starring: Brad Smith
- Presented by: Tyler Harcott
- No. of contestants: 25
- Winner: Bianka Kamber
- Runner-up: Whitney Lee
- No. of episodes: 9 (including 2 specials)

Release
- Original network: City
- Original release: October 3 – November 28, 2012

Season chronology
- Next → Season 2

The Bachelor Canada season 1 is the first season of City reality television series The Bachelor Canada. The season premiered on October 3, 2012. This season features 28-year-old Brad Smith, a former Canadian Football League slotback from Hudson, Quebec.

== Contestants ==
Biographical information according to City official series site, plus footnoted additions.

Name	Age	Hometown	Job	Eliminated
Bianka Kamber	28	Mississauga, Ontario	Nurse	Winner
Whitney Lee	24	Calgary, Alberta	Administrative Assistant	Episode 7
Kara Henderson	25	Delta, British Columbia	Grad Student	Episode 6
Gabrielle Dipersico	24	Oakville, Ontario	Law Student	Episode 5
Ana Calin	26	Ottawa, Ontario	Server	Episode 4
Britany Boutin	23	Swift Current, Saskatchewan	Nurse	Episode 4
Laura Bateman	23	Ottawa, Ontario	Cocktail Waitress	Episode 4
Chantelle Harink	25	Sylvan Lake, Alberta	Pastor	Episode 4 (Quit)
Michelle Beilhartz	27	Newmarket, Ontario	Yoga Instructor	Episode 3
Nicole De Vries	25	St. Thomas, Ontario	Optician	Episode 3
Sophie LeBlanc	26	Moncton, New Brunswick	University Recruitment Agent	Episode 3
Tia Borden	25	Ottawa, Ontario	Marketing Coordinator	Episode 3
Laura F.	23	Winnipeg, Manitoba	Medical Student	Episode 2
Melissa Marie Peters	28	North Vancouver, British Columbia	Playboy Model	Episode 2
Michelle Vessey	26	Calgary, Alberta	Petroleum Land Administrator	Episode 2
Stephanie Wuethrich	32	Montreal, Quebec	Model/Neuroscientist	Episode 2
Amber Zubriski	29	Winnipeg, Manitoba	Strip Club Server	Episode 1
Clarice Ching	25	Toronto, Ontario	Office Administrator	Episode 1
Fawn F.	25	Ajax, Ontario	Sales Associate	Episode 1
Mindy Olson	33	Rocky Mountain House, Alberta	Photo Lab Manager	Episode 1
Rebecca Harrison	27	Toronto, Ontario	Real Estate Agent	Episode 1
Sandy Denham	29	Wetaskiwin, Alberta	Makeup Artist	Episode 1
Tina Petrick	26	Thunder Bay, Ontario	Trial Lawyer	Episode 1
Tracy	28	Victoria, British Columbia	Grad Student	Episode 1

=== Future appearances ===
==== Bachelor in Paradise Canada ====
Bianka Kamber returned to compete on the first season of Bachelor in Paradise Canada. She was eliminated week 3.

== Call-out order ==
#	Bachelorettes	Episodes						
#	Bachelorettes	1	2	3	4	5	6	7
1	Laura B.	Whitney	Chantelle	Kara	Bianka	Kara	Bianka	Bianka
2	Michelle B.	Bianka	Laura B.	Chantelle	Whitney	Bianka	Whitney	Whitney
3	Michelle V.	Sophie	Kara	Gabrielle	Kara	Whitney	Kara	
4	Jessica	Tia	Tia	Britany	Gabrielle	Gabrielle		
5	Whitney	Michelle V.	Sophie	Ana	Ana; Britany			
6	Ana	Nicole	Britany	Bianka	Ana; Britany			
7	Mindy	Chantelle	Michelle B.	Laura B.	Laura B.			
8	Clarice	Britany	Gabrielle	Whitney	Chantelle			
9	Sophie	Laura B.	Whitney	Michelle B. Nicole; Sophie; Tia				
10	Britany	Michelle B.	Ana	Michelle B. Nicole; Sophie; Tia				
11	Rebecca	Laura F.	Nicole	Michelle B. Nicole; Sophie; Tia				
12	Tracy	Stephanie	Bianka	Michelle B. Nicole; Sophie; Tia				
13	Fawn	Melissa Marie	Laura F. Melissa Marie; Michelle V. Stephanie					
14	Stephanie	Gabrielle	Laura F. Melissa Marie; Michelle V. Stephanie					
15	Amber	Kara	Laura F. Melissa Marie; Michelle V. Stephanie					
16	Bianka	Ana	Laura F. Melissa Marie; Michelle V. Stephanie					
17	Chantelle	Amber; Clarice; Fawn; Jessica; Mindy; Rebecca; Sandy; Tina; Tracy						
18	Melissa Marie	Amber; Clarice; Fawn; Jessica; Mindy; Rebecca; Sandy; Tina; Tracy						
19	Tia	Amber; Clarice; Fawn; Jessica; Mindy; Rebecca; Sandy; Tina; Tracy						
20	Tina	Amber; Clarice; Fawn; Jessica; Mindy; Rebecca; Sandy; Tina; Tracy						
21	Nicole	Amber; Clarice; Fawn; Jessica; Mindy; Rebecca; Sandy; Tina; Tracy						
22	Laura F.	Amber; Clarice; Fawn; Jessica; Mindy; Rebecca; Sandy; Tina; Tracy						
23	Gabrielle	Amber; Clarice; Fawn; Jessica; Mindy; Rebecca; Sandy; Tina; Tracy						
24	Sandy	Amber; Clarice; Fawn; Jessica; Mindy; Rebecca; Sandy; Tina; Tracy						
25	Kara	Amber; Clarice; Fawn; Jessica; Mindy; Rebecca; Sandy; Tina; Tracy						

The contestant received a first impression rose
The contestant received a rose during the date
The contestant was eliminated
The contestant was eliminated during the date
The contestant quit the competition
The contestant won the competition
