= Larry Smith (Canadian politician) =

Canadian politician (born 1951)

The Honourable Larry Smith CQ
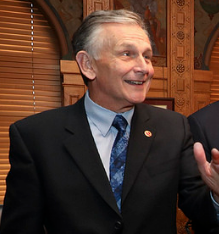

Leader of the Opposition in the Senate
- In office April 1, 2017 – November 5, 2019
- Prime Minister: Justin Trudeau
- Preceded by: Claude Carignan
- Succeeded by: Don Plett

Canadian Senator from Quebec (Saurel)
- In office May 25, 2011 – April 28, 2026
- Nominated by: Stephen Harper
- Appointed by: David Johnston
- Preceded by: Himself
- In office December 18, 2010 – March 25, 2011
- Nominated by: Stephen Harper
- Appointed by: David Johnston
- Preceded by: Jean Lapointe
- Succeeded by: Himself

Personal details
- Born: April 28, 1951 (age 75) Hudson, Quebec, Canada
- Party: Conservative (2004–2022, 2025–present)
- Other political affiliations: Canadian Senators Group (2022–2025)
- Spouse: Leesa
- Children: 3, including Brad
- Education: Bishop's University (B.A.); McGill University (B.C.L.)
- Profession: Politician; football player; businessman
- Football career

Profile
- Position: Running back

Career information
- College: Bishop's
- CFL draft: 1972: 1st round, 1st overall pick

Career history
- 1972–1980: Montreal Alouettes

Awards and highlights
- 2× Grey Cup champion (1974, 1977)
- Canadian Football Hall of Fame (Class of 2023)

Larry W. Smith, CQ (born April 28, 1951) is a Canadian athlete, businessperson and former member of the Senate of Canada. He served as Leader of the Opposition in the Senate from April 2017 until November 2019.

== Education ==
Smith graduated from Bishop's University with a bachelor's degree in economics. He was the first overall selection of the 1972 CFL draft and went on to play nine seasons in the Canadian Football League, all of them as a running back with the Montreal Alouettes. Smith earned a Bachelor of Civil Law from McGill University in 1976, having undertaken his studies for law while playing pro football.

== Football management career ==
Smith became the Canadian Football League's eighth commissioner in 1992 and oversaw the league's ill-fated attempt to expand to the United States. Smith then oversaw the re-location of the Baltimore Stallions to Montreal, where they became the Montreal Alouettes for the CFL's 1996 season. After resigning as commissioner in 1997, Smith served as president of the Alouettes until 2001 and again from 2004 to 2010.

Smith was announced as a member of the Canadian Football Hall of Fame 2023 class on March 16, 2023, in the builder's category.

== Business career ==
Smith was president and publisher of the Montreal Gazette newspaper from 2002 to 2004. He has also held positions with Industrial Life Technical Services, John Labatt, Ltd., and Ogilvie Mills, Ltd.

== Political career ==
Smith considered running for leader of the then new Conservative Party of Canada in 2004 and was widely reported by Canadian press at the time to be on the verge of entering the race before finally declaring he would not be a candidate.

On December 18, 2010, Smith was summoned to the Canadian Senate on the advice of Prime Minister Stephen Harper and sat as a Conservative. Following his appointment to the Senate, Smith announced his intention to seek the nomination to run as a Conservative candidate in Lac-Saint-Louis in the next federal election. When asked in a television interview why he accepted the appointment while intending to run for a Commons seat, Smith complained that he was taking a "dramatic, catastrophic" pay cut by serving as a senator, a remark for which Smith has been criticized.

Smith was defeated in his attempt to enter Parliament, placing third behind the incumbent Liberal MP and the NDP candidate, and it was announced on May 18, 2011, he would be re-appointed to the Senate.

The Conservative Senate Caucus elected Smith its leader on March 28, 2017; Smith defeated Senators Linda Frum and Stephen Greene for the position, and took office on April 1, 2017. He served until November 5, 2019, when he was succeeded by Don Plett.

On August 4, 2022, Smith left the Conservative caucus to join the Canadian Senators Group. Smith clarified that he would remain a member of the Conservative Party.

On June 12, 2025, it was announced by Leo Housakos, the leader of the opposition in the Senate, that Smith had rejoined the Senate Conservative Caucus. He was chair of the Canadian Senate Standing Committee on Transport and Communication in the 45th Canadian Parliament.

Smith retired from the Senate on April 28, 2026, upon reaching the mandatory retirement age of 75.

== Personal life ==
Smith has two sons and a daughter. One of his sons, Bradley, is a former receiver for the Toronto Argonauts and the Edmonton Eskimos, and the first Bachelor Canada, while his daughter, Ashley, was formerly married to CFL placekicker and punter Damon Duval.
