= The Bachelor New Zealand =

- Genre: Dating-based competition show
- Based on: The Bachelor (US)
- Presented by: Mike Puru (seasons 1–2); Dominic Bowden (season 3); Art Green (season 4)
- Country of origin: New Zealand
- No. of seasons: 3
- No. of episodes: 54

Production
- Production company: Warner Bros. International Television Production

Original release
- Network: Three (seasons 1-3); TVNZ 2 (season 4)
- Release: 17 March 2015 – present

The Bachelor New Zealand is a dating game show based on the original US version, The Bachelor. It aired on Sunday and Monday nights on Three. The first season's bachelor was Art Green and the show was won by Matilda Rice. The second season's bachelor was Jordan Mauger and the show was won by Fleur Verhoeven. The third season's bachelor was Zac Franich and the show was won by Viarni Bright.

The first season's bachelorettes were announced in early March 2015, and the show premiered on 17 March at 7:30 pm. Season two premiered on 7 March 2016.

News.com.au said that while the Bachelor New Zealand's first season was building on a well-established TV franchise, "for pure entertainment, nothing quite matches the dramatic viewing across the ditch in New Zealand".

TVNZ 2 picked up the rights to the series in 2020, firstly airing a local version of The Bachelorette New Zealand. A fourth season of The Bachelor New Zealand aired in 2021.

== Production ==
The series is produced by Warner Bros. International Television Production for TV network Three.

== Plot ==
As the show is designed, the series revolves around a single bachelor (deemed eligible) who starts with a pool of romantic interests (typically 25) from whom the bachelor is expected to select a wife. During the course of the season, the bachelor eliminates candidates, with the bachelor either electing to start a relationship with or proposing to his final choice. The participants travel to romantic and exotic locations for their adventures, and the conflicts in the series, both internal and external, stem from the elimination-style structure of the show.

== The elimination process ==
On each Bachelor episode, the bachelor interacts with the women and presents a rose to each woman he wishes to remain on the show. Those who do not receive a rose are eliminated. Eliminations are based upon the bachelor's personal feelings about each contestant, guided primarily by the impression made by each woman during dates or other events of the week. Most roses are presented at a rose ceremony at the end of each episode, but roses can also be bestowed on dates.

=== A group date ===
The bachelor and a group of women participates in an activity. Sometimes the activity takes the form of a competition, with the winner or winners spending more time with the bachelor. The bachelor typically presents a rose to the woman who makes the best impression during the group date.

=== A one-on-one date ===
The bachelor and one woman go on a date. The bachelor is given a chance to get to know the woman on a more personal level, and the dates are usually very intimate. If the date goes well and the bachelor wishes to spend more time with the woman or get to know them further, he may present them with a rose at the date. This means that during the rose ceremony at the end of each episode, she will be safe and there will be no chance of her going home.

=== Rose ceremony ===
The women who have not been eliminated stand in rows at one end of the room, and the bachelor faces them. The bachelor has a tray with roses. The bachelor takes a rose and calls a woman by name. The woman steps forward, and the bachelor asks, "Will you accept this rose?" The woman accepts, takes the rose, and makes her way to the other side of the room (where all the women who have been given a rose are required to stand.)

=== Home Visits ===
The bachelor visits the hometowns and families of each of the four remaining women. At the rose ceremony, one woman is eliminated, leaving three. Another episode airs before the final rose ceremony, leaving two women.

=== The Final Rose ===
The two remaining women separately meet with the bachelor's family. At the end of the episode, the bachelor selects one of the women by presenting the "final rose". That woman is said to be the "winner" of The Bachelor.

== Seasons ==
Season	Original run	Bachelor	Profile	Winner	Runner-up	Proposal	Still Together
1	17 March – 6 May 2015	Arthur "Art" Green	Age: 27; Location: Wellington; Profession: Personal trainer and entrepreneur	Matilda Rice	Dani Robinson	No	Yes
1	Green and Rice married in February 2019. They had a baby boy, Milo, in September 2019; a baby girl, Autumn, in June 2021; and a baby girl, Penelope, in December 2023.						
2	7 March – 10 May 2016	Jordan Mauger	Age: 32; Location: Christchurch; Profession: Film and television producer	Fleur Verhoeven	Nazanin "Naz" Khanjani	No	No
2	No proposal. Mauger and Verhoeven announced their breakup on 11 May 2016, one day after the After The Final Rose special aired.						
3	19 March – 22 May 2017	Zac Franich	Age: 28; Location: Hibiscus Coast; Profession: Lifeguard	Viarni Bright	Lily McManus	No	No
3	No proposal. Franich and Bright announced their breakup on 1 November 2017.						
4	2 March 2021 – present	Moses Mackay	Age: 30; Location: Auckland; Profession: Singer/Radio host	Annie Theis	Shenae Connelly	No	No
4	No proposal. Mackay and Theis announced their breakup during the Bachelor and Bachelorette tell all in April.						

== International broadcast ==
The series premiered in Australia on LifeStyle You from 21 July 2015.
