= The Bachelor Canada season 2 =

The Bachelor Canada
- Season 2
- Starring: Tim Warmels
- Presented by: Tyler Harcott
- No. of contestants: 24
- Winner: April Brockman
- Runner-up: Trisha Vergo
- No. of episodes: 10 (including 1 special)

Release
- Original network: City
- Original release: September 18 – November 18, 2014

Season chronology
- ← Previous; Season 1 Next → Season 3

The Bachelor Canada (season 2) is the second season of W Network reality television series The Bachelor Canada. The season premiered on September 18, 2014. This season features 28-year-old Tim Warmels, an entrepreneur from Milton, Ontario.

== Contestants ==
Biographical information according to City official series site, plus footnoted additions.

Name	Age	Hometown	Job	Eliminated
April Brockman	27	Wasaga Beach, Ontario	Realtor	Winner
Trisha Vergo	28	Edmonton, Alberta	Beauty Queen	Episode 8
Sachelle Violette	24	Sudbury, Ontario	University Recruitment Coordinator	Episode 7
Lisa Racz	25	Calgary, Alberta	Hairstylist	Episode 7
Kaylynn Taylor	26	Vancouver, British Columbia	Ballerina	Episode 6
Dominique Kost	28	Montreal, Quebec	Reception & IT	Episode 5 (quit)
Natalie Elliott	27	Cambridge, Ontario	Elementary French Teacher	Episode 4 (quit)
Rileigh Perin	23	Kingston, Ontario	Philosophy Student/Waitress	Episode 4
April Borgnetta	30	Victoria, British Columbia	Wax Artist	Episode 3
Christine White	29	Vancouver, British Columbia	Music Teacher	Episode 3
Jenny Campion	26	Hong Kong / Vancouver, British Columbia	Personal Trainer	Episode 3
Martha Reyes Islas	26	Cuernavaca, Mexico / Montreal, Quebec	Fashion Buyer	Episode 3
Alison Ruiz	27	Montreal, Quebec	Nurse	Episode 2
Renée-Anne Montpellier	28	Sherbrooke, Quebec	ER Doctor	Episode 2
Sonia Hoshowsky	42	Calgary, Alberta	Lingerie Model	Episode 2
Andrea Driedger	30	Kelowna, British Columbia	Dental Hygienist	Episode 1
Jacqueline Metcalfe	23	Toronto, Ontario	Law Office Admin Assistant	Episode 1
Jennifer Selinger	26	Montreal, Quebec	Joyologist	Episode 1
Jewel Brady	32	Toronto, Ontario	Accountant	Episode 1
Kelsey Palmer	28	Calgary, Alberta	Sommelier	Episode 1
Raelee Fedyna	26	Calgary, Alberta	Gymnast/Art Director	Episode 1
Rebecca Polak	24	Calgary, Alberta	Waitress	Episode 1
Ritiuska Leon	33	Puerto Ordaz, Venezuela / Calgary, Alberta	Engineer	Episode 1
Sarah Barber	31	St. Catharines, Ontario	Personal Trainer Worker	Episode 1
Sharan Garcha	23	Vancouver, British Columbia	IT Sales	Episode 1

== Call-out order ==
#	Bachelorettes	Episodes							
#	Bachelorettes	1	2	3	4	5	6	7	8
1	Rileigh	Christine	Kaylynn	Lisa	Trisha	April Br.	Trisha	April Br.	April Br.
2	Kaylynn	Natalie	Trisha	Kaylynn	Sachelle	Trisha	Sachelle	Trisha	Trisha
3	Raelee	Sachelle	April Bo.	Trisha	Lisa	Sachelle	April Br.	Sachelle	
4	Jennifer	Kaylynn	Christine	Sachelle	April Br.	Kaylynn	Lisa	Lisa	
5	April Br.	Jenny	Sachelle	April Br.	Dominique	Lisa	Kaylynn		
6	Sachelle	Dominique	Martha	Natalie	Kaylynn	Natalie (Note: Natalie showed up and asked to stay, but was eliminated at the rose ceremony.)			
7	Dominique	Martha	Dominique	Dominique	Rileigh	Dominique			
8	Trisha	Rileigh	Jenny	Rileigh	Natalie				
9	Andrea	April Bo.	Lisa	April Bo. Christine; Jenny; Martha					
10	Renée	Lisa	April Br.	April Bo. Christine; Jenny; Martha					
11	Ritiuska	Renée	Rileigh	April Bo. Christine; Jenny; Martha					
12	Alison	April Br.	Natalie	April Bo. Christine; Jenny; Martha					
13	Jacqueline	Alison	Alison; Renée						
14	Rebecca	Sonia	Alison; Renée						
15	Sarah	Trisha	Sonia						
16	Natalie	Andrea; Jacqueline; Jennifer; Jewel; Kelsey; Raelee; Rebecca; Ritiuska; Sarah; Sharan							
17	Sharan	Andrea; Jacqueline; Jennifer; Jewel; Kelsey; Raelee; Rebecca; Ritiuska; Sarah; Sharan							
18	Martha	Andrea; Jacqueline; Jennifer; Jewel; Kelsey; Raelee; Rebecca; Ritiuska; Sarah; Sharan							
19	Kelsey	Andrea; Jacqueline; Jennifer; Jewel; Kelsey; Raelee; Rebecca; Ritiuska; Sarah; Sharan							
20	Jenny	Andrea; Jacqueline; Jennifer; Jewel; Kelsey; Raelee; Rebecca; Ritiuska; Sarah; Sharan							
21	Jewel	Andrea; Jacqueline; Jennifer; Jewel; Kelsey; Raelee; Rebecca; Ritiuska; Sarah; Sharan							
22	Sonia	Andrea; Jacqueline; Jennifer; Jewel; Kelsey; Raelee; Rebecca; Ritiuska; Sarah; Sharan							
23	Christine	Andrea; Jacqueline; Jennifer; Jewel; Kelsey; Raelee; Rebecca; Ritiuska; Sarah; Sharan							
24	Lisa	Andrea; Jacqueline; Jennifer; Jewel; Kelsey; Raelee; Rebecca; Ritiuska; Sarah; Sharan							
25	April Bo.	Andrea; Jacqueline; Jennifer; Jewel; Kelsey; Raelee; Rebecca; Ritiuska; Sarah; Sharan							

The contestant received a first impression rose
The contestant received a rose during the date
The contestant was eliminated
The contestant was eliminated during the date
The contestant was eliminated outside the rose ceremony
The contestant quit the competition
The contestant won the competition

== Episodes (dates) ==
=== Week 1 ===
Original airdate: September 18, 2014

No dates for this week. Bachelor Tim Warmels meets the contestants. Natalie and Sachelle both receive roses before the Rose Ceremony.

First Impression Rose: Christine White

Rose Ceremony: Andrea, Jacqueline, Jennifer, Jewel, Kelsey, Raelee, Rebecca, Ritiuska, Sarah and Sharan do not receive a rose and are eliminated.

=== Week 2 ===
Original airdate: September 25, 2014

One-on-one: Kaylynn. Tim takes Kaylynn on a helicopter ride to Grouse Mountain where they enjoy dinner indoors. Kaylynn talks about her past experiences which impress Tim. They share the first kiss of the season and she receives a rose.

Group Date One: The girls are split up into two groups. Team One: Allison, Dominique, Lisa, Renee, Sachelle. Team Two: April Borgnetta, Jenny, Martha, Rileigh and Trisha. They go dragon boat racing. The winning team gets to spend extra time with Tim while the losing team must leave. Team two wins. They go to the Sun Garden for dinner. Trisha receives the date rose.

Group Date Two: Christine, Natalie, Sonia and April Brockman. Each girl has the chance to pose with Tim for a photo-shoot. Tim fails to connect with Sonia and they mutually agree it would be best for her to go home. April wins the 1-on-1 time.

Cocktail Party: Kaylynn becomes very emotional. Martha tries to cheer her up by saying she has nothing to worry about, Kaylynn takes this as an attack and breaks down.

Rose Ceremony: Renee and Allison are eliminated.

=== Week 3 ===
Original airdate: October 2, 2014

- Located in: Los Cabos

One-on-one: Lisa. Tim takes Lisa to Wild Canyon where they go on a "death swing." Later, they enjoy an outdoor dinner. Lisa receives a rose.

Group Date: Martha, Jenny, Sachelle and April Borgnetta. They watch and then perform traditional folk dancing. Sachelle wins the 1-on-1 time.

Tim cancels the second group date to spend more time with the girls. He also decides he will be sending four girls home instead of two. Some of the girls including Trisha are upset about this.

Rose Ceremony: Martha, Jenny, April Borgnetta and Christine are eliminated.

=== Week 4 ===
Original airdate: October 9, 2014

- Located in: The Bahamas

One-on-one: Natalie. Natalie and Tim enjoy a simple walk through the city. Natalie is extremely nervous and their time together is awkward. A frustrated Tim tells her he wants her to stay, but he doesn't feel confident enough to give her a rose. She decides to go home.

Group Date: April, Kaylynn, Lisa, Dominique and Sachelle. They go swimming with sharks. There is no group date rose.

Two-on-one: Trisha and Rileigh. They both spend 1-on-1 time together to talk so Tim can choose who he has the better connection with. He picks Trisha, and Rileigh is sent home. Trisha and Tim then proceed to have a dinner and play on the beach and she receives a rose.

Rose Ceremony: It comes down to Dominique and Kaylynn for the final rose, and Tim decides to keep them both for another week. Nobody is sent home.

=== Week 5 ===
Original airdate: October 14, 2014

- Located in: Toronto

One-on-one: April. They explore Toronto where Tim shows her some important places in his life and opens up a little bit about his past, she in return opens up about her past relationship. They then go play a game of pool and have dinner and she receives a rose.

Group Date: Kaylynn, Lisa, Sachelle and Trisha. They go to Canada's Wonderland where it's completely shut down just for them. They go on the rides and then go cart racing with the winner receiving alone time with Tim. Kaylynn wins.

At this point, Natalie returns and Dominique decides to send herself home before her 1-on-1 date with Tim. She warns Tim to be careful and to keep an eye on some of the girls.

Rose Ceremony: Natalie is eliminated.

=== Week 6 ===
Original airdate: October 21, 2014

- Located in: Tuscany

There are no group or date roses this week.

One-on-one: Trisha. They explore the city and enjoy an outdoor lunch. He gifts her a necklace earring set from Michael Hill Jeweller.

Before the group date, it's revealed that Lisa made out with another guy when the girls went out to a bar. Tim does not know yet, and all the girls are angry and say they will tell him if she doesn't.

Group Date: Lisa, Kaylynn and April. The girls paint a portrait of Tim. Tim picks the best painting without knowing who painted it. He chooses Lisa's picture and she wins the 1-on-1 time. Lisa tells him about the other night saying the Bartender gave her a kiss. He doesn't send her home.

One-on-one: Sachelle. They go to the Casa Buitoni where they cook and eat their own pizza. Sachelle tells Tim about the other night but it's a completely different story than what Lisa told him. Sachelle says that Lisa kept making out with the bartender even after the girls tried to get her to stop.

Rose Ceremony: Tim takes Lisa aside and she apologizes again. Kaylynn is sent home.

=== Week 7 ===
Original airdate: October 28, 2014

- Located in: Hometowns

Tim travels to the remaining four ladies hometowns to meet their families.

#	Contestant	Hometown
1	Trisha	Edmonton, Alberta
2	Sachelle	Sudbury, Ontario
3	April	Wasaga Beach, Ontario
4	Lisa	Calgary, Alberta

Trisha: Tim meets Trisha in Edmonton outside of a skating rink. She is wearing an Edmonton Oilers jersey and gives him a Maple Leafs one. They go inside the rink where it is completely empty and play a game of hockey and slow dance. Afterwards, they go to Trisha's house to meet her family. It goes over well and Tim says he feels like part of the family. After dinner when Tim leaves, Trisha admits she's falling for him, to which Tim replies, "I fell for you a long time ago."

Sachelle: They meet up in Toronto where they're supposed to take a flight together to Sachelle's hometown, but due to unforeseen weather the flight is delayed until later the day. Sachelle is upset and says the date is ruined, but Tim decides to turn it into a double hometown and show her around Toronto. They sit together on a bench discussing children and sipping coffee until it's time to leave. At Sachelle's, things take a sour turn when her brother interrogates Tim and tells him not to hurt Sachelle or drag her around any longer if he doesn't see her being the one.

April: Tim meets April on a beach in her hometown. She explains to him that she won't be meeting her mom and dad because her dad died of a drug overdose when she was eight and she doesn't have a relationship with her mother. Instead, he will be meeting her grandparents who raised her. They go to dinner at a restaurant previously owned by her grandparents. April's grandmother says she can see through Tim, but later warms up and tells him that she loves him. As they say goodbye, April admits that she's falling for Tim. Later, in a confessional, Tim admits that he's falling for April too.

Lisa: Tim meets Lisa at a park in her hometown. They go for a walk but stop at a nearby bench because Tim wants Lisa to explain again what happened in Tuscany. She says that she did tell him. He then tells her that while he can see himself falling for her, he wouldn't feel right to continue their relationship and that he can't meet her parents in good faith. She says she respects him not dragging her along. As Tim walks away, she says, "I knew it!" and smirks to the camera and says she's done.

Rose Ceremony: April is called first, then Trisha, leaving Sachelle without a rose and subsequently eliminated.

=== Week 8: Women Tell All ===
Original Airdate: November 4, 2014

Highlights include the girls confronting Lisa and Natalie saying she knew Tim wasn't into her but returned to add drama.

=== Week 9: Final Part One ===
Original Airdate: November 11, 2014

=== Week 10: Final Part Two ===
Original Airdate: November 18, 2014
