= The Bachelor (British TV series) =

British reality television series

- Genre: Dating game show
- Based on: The Bachelor by Mike Fleiss
- Presented by: Jeremy Milnes (2003–2005); Mark Wright (2019)
- Voices of: Hugo Speer (2011–2012)
- Country of origin: United Kingdom
- Original language: English
- No. of series: 6
- No. of episodes: 50

Production
- Running time: 60 minutes
- Production companies: BBC Bristol (BBC Three); Ricochet (Channel 5)

Original release
- Network: BBC Three
- Release: 30 March 2003 – 13 February 2005
- Network: Channel 5
- Release: 19 August 2011 – 31 August 2012
- Release: 4 March – 14 March 2019

Related
- The Bachelor (American version)

The Bachelor is a British reality television show that began airing on BBC Three from 30 March 2003 to 13 February 2005, before moving to Channel 5 from 19 August 2011 to 31 August 2012. The show is based on the American reality series of the same name. On 31 August 2018, it was announced that the show would return for a new ten-part series in 2019 on Channel 5. The short-lived 'revival' ran from 4 March 2019 to 14 March 2019.

== Plot ==
The series revolves around a single bachelor (deemed eligible) and a pool of romantic interests (typically 25), which could include a potential wife for the bachelor. The conflicts in the series, both internal and external, stem from the elimination-style format of the show. Early in the season, the bachelor goes on large group dates with the women, with the majority of women eliminated during rose ceremonies. As the series progresses, women are also eliminated on one-on-one dates and on elimination two-on-one dates. The process culminates with home-town visits to the families of the final four women, overnight dates at exotic locations with the final three women, and interaction with the bachelor's family and the final two women.

== Series overview ==
No.	Original run	Bachelor	Winner	Runner(s)-up
1	30 March–4 May 2003	David Donald	No series final, and therefore no winner	—N/a
2	23 January–27 February 2004	Jamie Williams	Jodi Plumb	—N/a
3	9 January–13 February 2005	Anthony Thomas	Lindsay Mann	—N/a
4	19 August–28 October 2011	Gavin Henson	Carianne Barrow	Layla Manoochehri
5	29 June–31 August 2012	Spencer Matthews	Khloe Evans	Charlotte "Tabby" Richards
6	4–14 March 2019	Alex Marks	Alicia Oates	Charlotte Tyler

=== Series 1 (2003) ===
The first series aired on BBC Three from 30 March to 4 May 2003.

=== Series 2 (2004) ===
The second series aired on BBC Three from 23 January to 27 February 2004.

=== Series 3 (2005) ===
The third series aired on BBC Three from 9 January to 13 February 2005.

=== Series 4 (2011) ===
The fourth series aired on Channel 5 from 19 August to 28 October 2011.

=== Series 5 (2012) ===
The fifth series aired on Channel 5 from 29 June to 31 August 2012.

=== Series 6 (2019) ===
On 31 August 2018, it was announced that a new series would be filmed this autumn in South Africa for Channel 5. The new series was hosted by Mark Wright.

== Transmissions ==
Series	Start date	End date	Episodes
1	30 March 2003	4 May 2003	7
2	23 January 2004	27 February 2004	7
3	9 January 2005	13 February 2005	7
4	19 August 2011	28 October 2011	10
5	29 June 2012	31 August 2012	10
6	4 March 2019	14 March 2019	9

== Cancellation ==
In June 2020, Channel 5 has announced that The Bachelor UK would not return, after just one series since 2019.
