= The Bachelor New Zealand season 1 =

The Bachelor New Zealand
- Season 1
- Starring: Arthur "Art" Green
- Presented by: Mike Puru
- No. of contestants: 21
- Winner: Matilda Rice
- Runner-up: Dani Robinson
- No. of episodes: 16

Release
- Original network: TV3
- Original release: March 17 – May 6, 2015

Season chronology
- Next → Season 2

The first season of The Bachelor New Zealand premiered on March 17, 2015. The season stars Arthur "Art" Green, a 27 year old personal trainer and entrepreneur from Wellington, courting 21 women.

== Contestants ==
The following is the list of bachelorettes for season one:

Name	Age	Hometown	Job	Eliminated
Matilda Rice	24	Auckland	Media sales executive	Winner
Dani Robinson	22	Auckland	Marketing assistant	Episode 16
Alysha Brown	26	Invercargill	High school English teacher	Episode 15
Poppy Salter	24	Auckland	Yoga instructor	Episode 14
Chrystal Chenery	30	Christchurch	Yoga teacher	Episode 12
Natalie Stol	23	Pukekohe	Event manager	Episode 11
Kristie Leonard	24	Balclutha	Primary school teacher	Episode 10
Danielle Beston	34	Auckland	Lawyer	Quit Episode 10
Amanda MacDonald	29	Auckland	Hair & makeup artist	Episode 8
Brigette Dickson	25	Queenstown	Personal trainer	Episode 7
Carrisa McDonald	21	Christchurch	Retail	Episode 7
Shivani Bhula	28	Wellington	Chiropractor	Episode 6
Hayley Blundell	25	Auckland	Entrepreneur	Episode 5
Lisa O'Loughlin	29	Auckland	Clinical research associate	Episode 4
Danielle Le Gallaisz	33	Auckland	Advertising executive	Quit Episode 3
Cristy Johnson	31	Auckland	Project manager	Episode 2
Natasha Fairley	26	Auckland	Lawyer/caregiver	Episode 2
Fiona Niles	27	Christchurch	Telecommunications	Episode 1
Michelle Honore	23	Auckland	Fashion buyers administrator	Episode 1
Nikki Sim	24	Invercargill	Solicitor	Episode 1
Rosie Kininmonth	30	Thames	Real estate agent	Quit Episode 1

== Call-out order ==
Contestants	Episode														
Contestants	1	2	3	4	5	6	7	8	9	10	11	12	13/14	15	16
Matilda	Matilda	Poppy	Matilda	Amanda	Dani	Chrystal	Alysha	Natalie	Matilda	Poppy	Alysha	Matilda	Alysha	Matilda	Matilda
Danielle L.	Danielle L.	Dani	Kristie	Poppy	Alysha	Dani	Kristie	Matilda	Danielle B.	Natalie	Dani	Alysha	Matilda	Dani	Dani
Alysha	Dani	Brigette	Carrisa	Hayley	Natalie	Natalie	Chrystal	Alysha	Alysha	Matilda	Chrystal	Dani	Dani	Alysha	
Danielle B.	Carrisa	Kristie	Chrystal	Danielle B.	Matilda	Danielle B.	Natalie	Kristie	Poppy	Alysha	Matilda	Poppy	Poppy		
Chrystal	Brigette	Matilda	Amanda	Brigette	Danielle B.	Poppy	Dani	Chrystal	Chrystal	Dani	Poppy	Chrystal			
Michelle	Lisa	Amanda	Poppy	Dani	Poppy	Amanda	Matilda	Poppy	Dani	Chrystal	Natalie				
Nikki	Shivani	Lisa	Alysha	Shivani	Chrystal	Carrisa	Danielle B.	Dani	Kristie	Kristie					
Shivani	Hayley	Chrystal	Shivani	Matilda	Amanda	Brigette	Poppy	Danielle B.	Natalie	Danielle B.					
Rosie	Danielle B.	Natalie	Brigette	Chrystal	Shivani	Alysha	Amanda	Amanda							
Poppy	Amanda	Hayley	Dani	Kristie	Kristie	Matilda	Brigette								
Brigette	Natalie	Carrisa	Danielle B.	Alysha	Brigette	Kristie	Carrisa								
Lisa	Natasha	Shivani	Hayley	Carrisa	Carrisa	Shivani									
Natalie	Alysha	Danielle B.	Lisa	Natalie	Hayley										
Kristie	Cristy	Alysha	Natalie	Lisa											
Fiona	Chrystal	Danielle L.	Danielle L.												
Hayley	Poppy	Cristy													
Carrisa	Kristie	Natasha													
Christy	Fiona														
Dani	Michelle														
Amanda	Nikki														
Natasha	Rosie														

This contestant won
This contestant received one of the first impression roses
This contestant received a rose during the date
This contestant received a rose outside of a date or the rose ceremony
This contestant was eliminated
This contestant quit

== Episodes ==
=== Episode 1 ===
The bachelorettes all arrive and meet the bachelor and endure their first cocktail party and rose ceremony.

Eliminated: Fiona, Michelle & Nikki

Quit: Rosie – Quit because she wanted someone who she could go on exciting adventures with and didn't think he would.

=== Episode 2 ===
Single Date: Poppy – Took a seaplane to a beach, went kayaking and had a picnic on the shore.

Group Date: Chrystal, Dani, Danielle B., Danielle L., Kristie, Lisa, Matilda, Natalie & Shivani - Took a super yacht into the harbor. Chrystal and Danielle L. went biscuiting with Arthur and Dani went tandem jet-skiing with him.

Eliminated: Cristy & Natasha

=== Episode 3 ===
Single Date: Matilda – Climbed the Auckland Harbour Bridge and went bungy jumping followed by a picnic on the bridge.

Group Date: Alysha, Amanda, Brigette, Carrisa & Kristie - Rally driving competition. Kristie was the fastest girl and got some time alone with Arthur.

Quit: Danielle L. – She left because she could not get past the age difference and didn't think they'd fall in love. The rest of the girls who had not been given roses were all given one.

=== Episode 4 ===
Single Date: Amanda - Took a drive to Muriwai where they played golf. Then went beach where they had a dinner in Moroccan style gazebo while a string quartet played.

Group Date: Alysha, Chrystal, Hayley, Lisa, Natalie & Poppy - Took the girls to the alligator pit at the zoo where they worked together and cleaned it. Poppy was the girl who impressed Arthur the most and so they had one on one time and fed the lemurs.

Eliminated: Lisa

=== Episode 5 ===
Single Date: Dani - Went zip-lining through the bush and had a picnic.

Group Date: Amanda, Brigette, Carrisa, Danielle B., Hayley, Kristie, Matilda, Natalie, Poppy & Shivani - The girls went laser skeet shooting on Waiheke Island. Hayley was the girl who did best and had a one on one archery tutorial with Arthur.

Eliminated: Hayley

=== Episode 6 ===
Single Date: Chrystal - They took a Japanese cooking class and made sushi together. Chrystal received a dress selected by Art and was taken on a glamorous date at the museum where they had the sushi they made for dinner. Afterwards they went to the roof of the museum to admire the skyline where Art gave Chrystal some diamond earrings.

Group Date: All of the bachelorettes attended the group date. The girls were made up and strutted their stuff on the catwalk in front of Art. Dani was chosen as the best and took part in a photo-shoot with Art.

Eliminated: Shivani

=== Episode 7 ===
Single Date: Alysha - Was taken wine tasting and then they had a picnic in the vineyard.

Group Date: Chrystal, Brigette, Dani, Danielle B., Kristie & Natalie - They were taken to a trampoline park where they played dodge ball. Dani was deemed the best and won some time alone with Arthur.

Eliminated: Brigette & Carrisa

=== Episode 8 ===
Single Date: Natalie - Was taken on a super-yacht and they went paddle boarding in the harbor at sunset. Later they got cozy and had dinner on the boat.

Group Date: Amanda, Chrystal, Danielle B., Matilda & Poppy - All had a pool party with Arthur.

Eliminated: Amanda

=== Episode 9 ===
Single Date: Kristie - Went swimming near a spring with a waterfall in the Bay of Plenty. Kristie had a panic attack in the water after diving in and Art helped her to shore. Afterwards the pair had a couples massage followed by a picnic at sunset on a hilltop.

Group Date: All of the bachelorettes attended the group date where they went horseback riding. Matilda's horse got rowdy and she fell off and was taken to hospital where she was told she broke her wrist. Art later gave her a rose at the hospital.

Eliminated: No one - Kristie and Natalie were the last two girls left. Art left the ceremony and on his return chose not to send anyone home.

=== Episode 10 ===
Single Date: Poppy. - Went skydiving together and berry picking after they landed. They then went swimming in a river and got cozy at a lodge.

Single Date: Danielle B. - Went blo-kart racing. Later they roasted marshmallows and got warm by a bonfire on the beach.

Eliminated: Kristie

Quit: Danielle B. - Although Art gave her a rose on their date, Danielle decided she didn't feel any chemistry with him and returned it to him at the cocktail party and left the mansion.

=== Episode 11 ===
Single Date: Alysha - Took a helicopter to White Island where they had a tour. Later they had a picnic overlooking the ocean followed by a swim in the sea. Alysha revealed she was once married before.

Group Date: Chrystal, Dani, Matilda & Natalie - Played doubles tennis with Arthur and went to a food truck where they had burgers. Chrystal was taken to the nearby schoolhouse to be alone with Art where he showed her a bit about his childhood. Natalie was picked for one on one time with Art and they sat in the barn and were serenaded by Tiki Taane.

Eliminated: Natalie

=== Episode 12 ===
Single Date: Matilda - Go for an airplane ride and paddle in the lake in some tranquil gardens.

Group Date: Alysha & Dani - Go sea fishing on a boat with Art. Dani whisked Art away for alone time leaving Alysha by herself, before she had some time with Art herself.

Eliminated: Chrystal

=== Episodes 13/14 ===
Art visited the homes and families of Alysha, Dani, Matilda and Poppy. Art won over Matilda's father and was grilled harshly by Dani's stepmother in episode 13. In episode 14 Poppy's mother and friend liked Art, while Art tried to find out from Alysha's parents if she was ready for a relationship after her divorce.

Eliminated: Poppy

=== Episode 15 ===
Dani goes surfing with Art on the Gold Coast and they spend the night together. Matilda and Art paddle in a gondola and have dinner and dessert on a penthouse balcony. Alysha goes with Art on a helicopter tour and land at a health and spa retreat.

Eliminated: Alysha

=== Episode 16 (Finale) ===
Winner: Matilda - Art gave Matilda a promise ring and asked her to start a relationship with him. Runner-up: Dani
