= The Bachelor (Greek TV series) =

Greek reality television series

- Genre: Reality television
- Created by: Mike Fleiss
- Based on: The Bachelor
- Presented by: George Satsidis
- Country of origin: Greece
- Original language: Greek
- No. of seasons: 1
- No. of episodes: 35

Original release
- Network: Alpha TV
- Release: September 10, 2020 – December 18, 2021

The Bachelor is a Greek reality television series, based on the American version of the same name. The show began airing on September 10, 2020 on Alpha TV. George Satsidis is the host of the show.

The second season has been announced and began airing on September 7, 2021.

== Plot ==
The program has a format similar to the American version, with 20 women competing for a single man to be selected as his romantic partner. Through the series, he learns more about each contestant. At the end of each episode, the candidates will be awarded a rose by the bachelor, symbolizing their continued stay in the contest. On the other hand, candidates who do not receive a rose are eliminated and leave the program.

== Seasons ==
Season	Originally aired		Bachelor	Winner	Runner(s)-up	Proposal	Still together	Relationship notes
Season	First aired	Last aired	Bachelor	Winner	Runner(s)-up	Proposal	Still together	Relationship notes
1	September 10, 2020	December 18, 2020	Panagiotis Vasilakos	Nicoletta Tsompanidou	Vivian Panagiotopoulou	Yes	No	Vasilakos proposed to Tsompanidou and they entered into a relationship. Vasilakos and Tsompanidou broke up after several months.
2	September 7, 2021	December 18, 2021	Alexis Pappas	Athena Vas	Anna Zeniou	No	No	Pappas didn't propose to Vasilopoulos, but they entered into a relationship.

== Ratings ==
Season	Time slot (EET)	# Ep.	Premiered		Ended		TV season	Viewers (in millions)
Season	Time slot (EET)	# Ep.	Date	Viewers (in millions)	Date	Viewers (in millions)	TV season	Viewers (in millions)
1	Wednesday, Thursday & Friday 10:00pm	35	September 10, 2020	0.640	December 18, 2020	1.164	2020–2021	
2	TBA	TBA	September 7, 2021	TBA	December 18, 2021	TBA	2021–2022	
