= The Bachelor (British TV series) series 4 =

The Bachelor
- Series 4
- Promotional poster
- Starring: Gavin Henson
- No. of episodes: 10

Release
- Original network: Channel 5
- Original release: 19 August – 28 October 2011

Series chronology
- Next → Series 5

The Bachelor UK 2011 was the fourth series of the reality television series The Bachelor, featuring Gavin Henson as "The Bachelor". The show was off-air for 6 years in the UK after the show previously aired on BBC Three, but was aired on Channel 5 between 19 August 2011 to 28 October 2011.

== Production ==
Filming of the series took place over 2 months, in the south of France, Italy, the UK, with the final held in St. Lucia. The Batchelor was rugby player, Gavin Henson. In the 7th episode, Henson was required to visit the parents of the quarter finalists which meant that for one of the contestants, Zivile, he had to visit Vilnius, Lithuania.

Finalist Layla Manoochehri was previously notable for being the girlfriend of Simon Webbe, whom she broke up with in 2011, as well as for reaching the finals of the fifth season of The X Factor as a member of the group Girlband.

== Contestants ==
The 25 contestants were as follows:

- Morgan, glamour model from Derby
- Nickie, single mum from Blackpool
- Zivile, retail stylist from Vilnius
- Chantelle, model from The Wirral
- Keshia, PE student from Cheltenham
- Angharad, beauty adviser from Cardiff
- April, fashion designer from Hertfordshire
- Georgie, cruise ship singer from Staffordshire
- Carrie, beauty adviser from Devon
- Bryony and Kathryn, property entrepreneur twins from London
- Zena, web designer from Hertfordshire
- Aaleeah, businesswoman from London
- Natasha, travel consultant from London
- Ola, fashion retailer from London
- Laura, receptionist from The Wirral
- Tia, promotional model from Derby
- Laura Blair, dancer from London
- Sammy, flight attendant from Essex
- Tabby, model from London
- Danielle, receptionist from Liverpool
- Vikki, accountant manager from Dorking
- Sammi, businesswoman from Kent
- Carianne Barrow, model from Middlesex -Winner
- Layla Manoochehri, songwriter from Essex

=== Quarter-final ===
Quarter-finalists were Layla, Carianne, Zivile, Morgan and April. The Bachelor visited the parents and family of the contestants.

=== Semi-final ===
Layla, Carianne and April were selected for the semi-final in St. Lucia. After dates with the three girls Gavin decided to let April go, leaving Carianne and Layla to battle it out for his affections.

=== Final ===
Layla and Carianne were the last two he shared romantic dates with. Although he said he had feelings for both the girls, he said that he loved Carianne and he chose her as his "girlfriend", telling her he loved her and she replied that she loved him also.

Carianne broke up with Henson in early 2012, describing him as "spineless" and "really dry" and saying the "whole experience was really fake".

== Call-Out Order ==
Gavin's Call-Out Order
#	Bachelorettes	Episodes									
#	Bachelorettes	1	2	3	4	5	6	7	8	9	10
1	Aaleeah	Layla	Nickie	Carianne	Keshia	Morgan	Layla	April	Layla	Carianne	Carianne
2	Angharad	Carrie	Zivile	April	Layla	April	Georgie	Layla	Carianne	Layla	Layla
3	April	Danielle	Carianne	Zivile	Carianne	Angharad	Morgan	Morgan	April	April	
4	Bryony	Georgie	Danielle	Nickie	Angharad	Zivile	April	Carianne	Morgan		
5	Carianne	Nickie	Ola	Morgan	Georgie	Georgie	Keshia	Zivile	Zivile		
6	Carrie	Zivile	Layla	Ola	April	Layla	Zivile	Keshia			
7	Chantelle	Ola	Keshia	Layla	Zivile	Nickie	Carianne	Georgie			
8	Danielle	April	Angharad	Georgie	Nickie	Keshia	Angharad				
9	Georgie	Vikki	Morgan	Angharad	Morgan	Carianne	Nickie				
10	Kathryn	Angharad	Georgie	Keshia	Ola						
11	Keshia	Morgan	Carrie	Carrie	Carrie						
12	Laura	Aaleeah	Laura B.	Laura B.							
13	Laura B.	Keshia	April	Danielle							
14	Layla	Carianne	Aaleeah								
15	Morgan	Laura B.	Vikki								
16	Natasha	Bryony									
17	Nickie	Chantelle									
18	Ola	Kathryn									
19	Sammi	Laura									
20	Sammy	Natasha									
21	Tabby	Sammi									
22	Tia	Sammy									
23	Vikki	Tabby									
24	Zena	Tia									
25	Zivile	Zena									

The contestant was eliminated at the rose ceremony
The contestant was on a two-one-one date and received a rose prior to the rose ceremony
Quit
The contestant was on a one-on-one date and received at rose prior to the rose ceremony
The contestant was on a two-on-one date and was eliminated
The contestant was given a rose prior to the rose ceremony
The contestant won the competition

== Ratings ==
Episode Viewing figures from BARB.

Episode	Date	Total Viewers	Channel 5 Weekly Ranking
1	19 August 2011	1,430,000	7
2	26 August 2011	1,380,000	13
3	2 September 2011	1,310,000	12
4	16 September 2011	1,250,000	15
5	23 September 2011	1,260,000	14
6	30 September 2011	1,240,000	13
7	7 October 2011	1,310,000	11
8	14 October 2011	1,360,000	11
9	21 October 2011	1,500,000	12
10	28 October 2011	1,600,000	8
