= The Bachelor (British TV series) series 5 =

The Bachelor
- Series 5
- Starring: Spencer Matthews
- No. of episodes: 10

Release
- Original network: Channel 5
- Original release: 29 June – 31 August 2012

Series chronology
- ← Previous; Series 4 Next → Series 6

The Bachelor UK 2012 was the fifth series of the reality television series The Bachelor, featuring Spencer Matthews (of Made in Chelsea fame) as "The Bachelor". The series is aired again on Channel 5.

== Contestants ==
The 24 contestants were as follows:

| Name | Age* | Hometown | Occupation | Episode |
|---|---|---|---|---|
| Khloe Evans | 21 | Manchester | Personal Assistant | Winner |
| Charlotte "Tabby" Richards | 24 | London | Make-Up Artist | Runner-Up |
| Chloe Levitt-Collins | 25 | London | Model Booker and Dancer | Episode 9 |
| Jessica (Jess) Quioque | 26 | London | Dancer | Episode 8 |
| Helen Hawkins | 22 | Middlesbrough | Fitness Instructor | Episode 7 |
| Aisha Uka | 26 | London | Finance PA | Episode 6 |
| Marissa Jiang | 29 | London | Entrepreneur | Episode 6 |
| Brandy Brewer | 25 | Cornwall | Glamour Model | Episode 5 |
| Renay Louise | 24 | Buckinghamshire | Model | Episode 5 |
| Natalia Savelyeva | 31 | London | Actress | Episode 4 |
| Danielle Sheehan | 21 | Norfolk | Mental Health Care Worker | Episode 4 |
| Jeneva Leonard-Kutler | 22 | Cornwall | Actress | Episode 3 |
| Rachel McMahon | 21 | South Shields | Dancer | Episode 3 |
| Iraida Neira | 25 | Birmingham | PhD Student | Episode 2 |
| Jerri Lee | 28 | London | Promotional Model | Episode 2 |
| Alexis Medrano | 22 | Essex | Shop Assistant | Episode 1 |
| Jennifer (Jenny) Nelson | 21 | Derby | Care Worker | Episode 1 |
| Katrina Voulgari | 20 | The Wirral | Office Temp | Episode 1 |
| Megan Jones | 20 | Stevenage | Professional Footballer | Episode 1 |
| Rachel Boon | 24 | Surrey | Childminder | Episode 1 |
| Rebecca Rock | 25 | Hertfordshire | Hair Colourist | Episode 1 |
| Sophia Port | 25 | London | Finance PA | Episode 1 |
| Sarah Stewart | 21 | Nottingham | Student | Episode 1 |
| Victoria Ebel | 23 | Guildford | Health Care Technician | Episode 1 |

* at time of competition

== Call-Out Order ==
Spencers's Call-Out Order
| # | Bachelorettes | Episode | | | | | | | | | |
| # | Bachelorettes | 1 | 2 | 3 | 4 | 5 | 6 | 7 | 8 | 9 | 10 |
|---|---|---|---|---|---|---|---|---|---|---|---|
| 1 | Aisha | Tabby | Jess | Chloe | Tabby | Marissa | Jess | Tabby | Chloe | Tabby | Khloe |
| 2 | Alexis | Khloe | Tabby | Danielle | Renay | Helen | Tabby | Khloe | Tabby | Khloe | Tabby |
| 3 | Brandy | Danielle | Aisha | Brandy | Khloe | Khloe | Khloe | Jess | Khloe | Chloe | |
| 4 | Chloe | Rachel M. | Danielle | Renay | Aisha | Renay | Helen | Chloe | Jess | | |
| 5 | Danielle | Jess | Renay | Marissa | Helen | Jess | Chloe | Helen | | | |
| 6 | Helen | Jeneva | Jeneva | Jess | Jess | Aisha | Aisha | | | | |
| 7 | Iraida | Marissa | Chloe | Khloe | Marissa | Tabby | Marissa | | | | |
| 8 | Jeneva | Natalia | Khloe | Aisha | Chloe | Chloe | | | | | |
| 9 | Jenny | Aisha | Rachel M. | Tabby | Brandy | Brandy | | | | | |
| 10 | Jerri | Jerri | Helen | Helen | Natalia | | | | | | |
| 11 | Jess | Helen | Brandy | Natalia | Danielle | | | | | | |
| 12 | Katrina | Iraida | Marissa | Jeneva | | | | | | | |
| 13 | Khloe | Renay | Natalia | Rachel M. | | | | | | | |
| 14 | Marissa | Chloe | Iraida | | | | | | | | |
| 15 | Megan | Brandy | Jerri | | | | | | | | |
| 16 | Natalia | Alexis | | | | | | | | | |
| 17 | Rachel B. | Jenny | | | | | | | | | |
| 18 | Rachel M. | Katrina | | | | | | | | | |
| 19 | Rebecca | Megan | | | | | | | | | |
| 20 | Renay | Rachel B. | | | | | | | | | |
| 21 | Sarah | Rebecca | | | | | | | | | |
| 22 | Sophia | Sophia | | | | | | | | | |
| 23 | Tabby | Sarah | | | | | | | | | |
| 24 | Victoria | Victoria | | | | | | | | | |

The contestant was eliminated at the rose ceremony
The contestant went on two-on-one date and was given a rose prior to the Rose Ceremony
The contestant was on a one-on-one date and was eliminated
The contestant was given a rose at the Rose Ceremony and rejected it
The contestant was on a two-on-one date and got eliminated
The contestant was given a rose prior to the Rose Ceremony
The contestant won the competition

== Ratings ==
Episode Viewing figures from BARB.

| Episode | Date | Total Viewers | Channel 5 Weekly Ranking |
|---|---|---|---|
| 1 | 29 June 2012 | 850,000 | 27 |
| 2 | 6 July 2012 | 880,000 | 24 |
| 3 | 13 July 2012 | 900,000 | 24 |
| 4 | 20 July 2012 | Under 810,000 | Outside Top 30 |
| 5 | 27 July 2012 | Under 730,000 | Outside Top 30 |
| 6 | 3 August 2012 | 720,000 | 25 |
| 7 | 10 August 2012 | Under 610,000 | Outside Top 30 |
| 8 | 17 August 2012 | Under 780,000 | Outside Top 30 |
| 9 | 24 August 2012 | Under 750,000 | Outside Top 30 |
| 10 | 31 August 2012 | 960,000 | 21 |
