= The Bachelor (Greek TV series) season 1 =

The Bachelor
- Season 1
- Starring: Panagiotis Vasilakos
- No. of episodes: 35

Release
- Original network: Alpha TV
- Original release: September 10 – December 18, 2020

Season chronology
- Next → Season 2

The 1st season of The Bachelor premiered on September 10, 2020 on Alpha TV. This season featured the first greek bachelor, 30-year-old Panagiotis Vasilakos from Mani, a real estate manager, is a graduate of Physical Education and has been professionally involved in football having played in teams in Greece and abroad.

He has participated on the first season of the reality competition Nomads. On episode 15 he left the show for personal reasons. By participating in "The Bachelor" he wants to take the next step in his personal life and meet the woman of his dreams. The one who will "steal" his mind, heart and conquer him with her character and personality.

== Contestants ==
In the first week 20 women entered the game. In the seventh week one new woman (Anna) entered the game, bringing the total number of women to 21. Stella as the new woman entered the game in the ninth week, with the number of women being 22.

Name	Age	Hometown	Occupation	Arrived	Outcome	Place
Nicoletta Tsompanidou	21	Thessaloniki	Cheerleader	Week 1	Winner	1
Vivian Panagiotopoulou	23	Amaliada	Pharmacy student	Week 1	Runner-up	2
Angelina Haldenda	20	Athens	Hairdresser	Week 1	Week 15	3
Rafaela Georgiou	20	Cyprus	Model	Week 1	Week 15	4
Sia Voskanidou	26	Alexandroupoli	Baby nurse	Week 1	Week 14	5
Erietta Papagioti	21	Santorini	Tourist enterprises	Week 1	Week 13	6
Anna Tsara	19	Corinth	Pharmacy student	Week 7	Week 12	7
Stella Ritzaki	23	Crete	Dietician	Week 9	Week 10	8
Marina Likmeta	20	Patras	Business Administrator	Week 1	Week 9	9 (quit)
Christina Tzika	27	Kavala	Private employee	Week 1	Week 8	10
Anastasia Sevastiadou	24	Patras	Beautician	Week 1	Week 7	11
Elena Mpasi	38	Katerini	Singer	Week 1	Week 6	12
Magdalene Zafiriou	28	Mytilene	Web developer	Week 1	Week 6	13 (quit)
Marievi Fragaki	21	Crete	Waitress	Week 1	Week 6	14
Annie Vasila	23	Thessaloniki	Acting student	Week 1	Week 5	15–16
Samantha Stoecklmayer	26	Cyprus	Painter/Artist	Week 1	Week 5	15–16
Daria Erochina	25	Cyprus	Interior architect/designer	Week 1	Week 4	17
Magda Ntala	26	Heraklion	Law School Graduate	Week 1	Week 4	18
Cassiani Michailidou	35	Athens	Air hostess	Week 1	Week 3	19
Katerina Manou	31	Thessaloniki	Nurse	Week 1	Week 2	20
Alexandra Alexi	30	Athens	Make up artist	Week 1	Week 1	21–22
Vasiliki Souladaki	33	Crete	Pastry cook	Week 1	Week 1	21–22

== Call-out order ==
Order	Bachelorettes	Week															
Order	Bachelorettes	1	2	3	4	5	6	7	8	9 (Note: Marina was the seventh woman, who would take the rose, but she rejected it. Then Panagiotis stopped the rose ceremony and Erietta and Stella didn't take a rose, but both continued in the show. Therefore, the two remaining women are listed in alphabetical order.)	10	12 (Note: On Week 11, there was no elimination)	13	14	15		
1	Anastasia	Rafaela	Sia	Anastasia	Vivian	Nicoletta	Rafaela	Nicoletta	Nicoletta	Anna	Vivian	Vivian	Nicoletta	Nicoletta	Nicoletta	Nicoletta	Nicoletta
2	Annie	Vivian	Nicoletta	Magdalene	Annie	Marina	Angelina	Marina	Erietta	Rafaela	Nicoletta	Nicoletta	Rafaela	Rafaela	Angelina	Vivian	Vivian
3	Samantha	Daria	Marina	Angelina	Samantha	Sia	Vivian	Rafaela	Anna	Vivian	Sia	Angelina	Angelina	Angelina	Vivian	Angelina	
4	Erietta	Katerina	Rafaela	Elena	Christina	Rafaela	Anastasia	Anna	Sia	Sia	Rafaela	Erietta	Vivian	Vivian	Rafaela		
5	Nicoletta	Marievi	Vivian	Vivian	Erietta	Erietta	Marina	Sia	Vivian	Nicoletta	Anna	Sia	Sia	Sia			
6	Magdalene	Sia	Elena	Sia	Elena	Anastasia	Sia	Vivian	Rafaela	Angelina	Erietta	Rafaela	Erietta				
7	Sia	Marina	Anastasia	Samantha	Rafaela	Vivian	Nicoletta	Erietta	Marina	Erietta	Angelina	Anna					
8	Katerina	Nicoleta	Cassiani	Christina	Magdalene	Marievi	Christina	Christina	Angelina	Stella	Stella						
9	Rafaela	Magdalene	Magdalene	Rafaela	Sia	Elena	Erietta	Angelina	Christina	Marina							
10	Vivian	Anastasia	Daria	Daria	Marievi	Christina	Elena	Anastasia									
11	Cassiani	Cassiani	Samantha	Erietta	Nicoletta	Magdalene	Magdalene										
12	Elena	Erietta	Erietta	Nicoletta	Angelina	Angelina	Marievi										
13	Marina	Christina	Marievi	Magda	Marina	Annie; Samantha											
14	Alexandra	Elena	Christina	Annie	Anastasia	Annie; Samantha											
15	Angelina	Magda	Magda	Marievi	Daria												
16	Magda	Samantha	Angelina	Marina	Magda												
17	Marievi	Annie	Annie	Cassiani													
18	Christina	Angelina	Katerina														
19	Daria	Alexandra; Vasiliki															
20	Vasiliki	Alexandra; Vasiliki															
21	Anna (Note: This woman was an intruder and did not join the competition until Week 7.)																
22	Stella (Note: This woman was an intruder and did not join the competition until Week 9.)																

The contestant received a first impression rose
The contestant received a rose during the date
The contestant was eliminated
The contestant was eliminated during the date
The contestant was given a rose at the Rose Ceremony and rejected it
The contestant quit the competition
The contestant won the competition

== Episodes ==
=== Week 1 ===
==== Episode 1 ====
Original airdate: September 10, 2020

- First impression rose: Rafaela
- Eliminated in Rose ceremony: Alexandra & Vasiliki

=== Week 2 ===
==== Episode 2 ====
Original airdate: September 17, 2020

- Single date: Sia
- Group date: Magdalene, Nicoletta, Erietta, Rafaela, Vivian, Marievi, Anastasia, Christina, Angelina, Marina
- One-on-One Time: Nicoletta

==== Episode 3 ====
Original airdate: September 18, 2020

- Group date: Marievi, Cassiani, Christina, Samantha, Angelina, Elena, Vivian, Marina, Annie, Nicoleta
- One-on-One Time: Marina
- Single date: Marievi
- Eliminated in Rose ceremony: Katerina

=== Week 3 ===
==== Episode 4 ====
Original airdate: September 23, 2020

- Group date: Magda, Angelina, Sia, Marina, Elena, Anastasia, Cassiani, Erietta, Daria, Samantha
- One-on-One Time: Anastasia
- Single date: Magdalene

==== Episode 5 ====
Original airdate: September 24, 2020

- Group date: Angelina, Marina, Christina, Erietta, Marievi, Cassiani, Vivian
- One-on-One Time: Angelina
- Single date: Angelina

==== Episode 6 ====
Original airdate: September 25, 2020

- Group date: Vivian, Magda, Sia, Nicoletta, Annie, Anastasia, Rafaela, Samantha, Erietta, Magdalene
- Single date: Elena
- Eliminated in Rose ceremony: Cassiani

=== Week 4 ===
==== Episode 7 ====
Original airdate: September 30, 2020

- Group date: Marievi, Christina, Rafaela, Vivian, Marina, Nicoletta, Annie, Elena, Magda, Anastasia
- Received a white rose: Nicoletta
- Single date: Vivian

==== Episode 8 ====
Original airdate: October 1, 2020

- Two-on-One Time: Annie, Magda
- Eliminated in Two-on-One Date: Magda
- Group date: Angelina, Samantha, Christina, Marina, Erietta, Vivian, Anastasia, Nicoletta
- One-on-One Time: Samantha

==== Episode 9 ====
Original airdate: October 2, 2020

- Group date: Anastasia, Samantha, Rafaela, Christina, Erietta, Vivian
- One-on-One Time: Christina
- Single date: Daria
- Eliminated in Rose ceremony: Daria

=== Week 5 ===
==== Episode 10 ====
Original airdate: October 7, 2020

- Single date: ~~Angelina~~ Nicoletta (because of the white rose)
- Group date: Marina, Magdalene, Sia, Elena, Marievi, Christina, Rafaela
- One-on-One Time: Marina

==== Episode 11 ====
Original airdate: October 8, 2020

- Single date: Sia
- Group date: Rafaela, Anastasia, Christina, Magdalene, Samantha, Angelina, Vivian, Erietta
- One-on-One Time: Rafaela

==== Episode 12 ====
Original airdate: October 9, 2020

- Group date: Elena, Nicoletta, Erietta, Angelina, Marina, Christina
- One-on-One Time: Erietta
- Single date: Marievi
- Eliminated in Rose ceremony: Annie & Samantha

=== Week 6 ===
==== Episode 13 ====
Original airdate: October 14, 2020

- Group date: Rafaela, Anastasia, Christina, Sia, Magdalene, Marina
- Group date: Sia, Marina, Rafaela
- One-on-One Time: Rafaela
- Single date: Angelina

==== Episode 14 ====
Original airdate: October 15, 2020

- Two-on-One Time: Magdalene, Marievi
- Eliminated in Two-on-One Date: Marievi
- Group date: Nicoletta, Erietta, Sia, Vivian, Anastasia, Marina

==== Episode 15 ====
Original airdate: October 16, 2020

- Group date: Vivian, Anastasia, Angelina, Rafaela, Marina
- Single date: Magdalene
- Quit: Magdalene
- Eliminated in Rose ceremony: Elena

=== Week 7 ===
==== Episode 16 ====
Original airdate: October 22, 2020

- Group date: Erietta, Nicoletta, Marina, Christina, Angelina
- One-on-One Time: Nicoletta
- Single date: Marina

==== Episode 17 ====
Original airdate: October 23, 2020

- Group date: Sia, Rafaela, Vivian, Anastasia
- Eliminated in Rose ceremony: Anastasia

=== Week 8 ===
==== Episode 18 ====
Original airdate: October 29, 2020

- Group date: Anna, Marina, Vivian, Christina, Nicoletta, Erietta
- One-on-One Time: Nicoletta
- Single date: Erietta

==== Episode 19 ====
Original airdate: October 30, 2020

- Group date: Anna, Sia, Angelina, Marina
- One-on-One Time: Anna
- Two-on-One Time: Angelina, Christina
- Eliminated in Rose ceremony: Christina

=== Week 9 ===
==== Episode 20 ====
Original airdate: November 5, 2020

- Group date: Anna, Stella, Rafaela, Angelina
- One-on-One Time: Anna

==== Episode 21 ====
Original airdate: November 6, 2020

- Single date: Rafaela
- Single date: Stella
- Quit: Marina

=== Week 10 ===
==== Episode 22 ====
Original airdate: November 12, 2020

- Group date: Vivian, Angelina, Sia, Rafaela
- One-on-One Time: Vivian
- Single date: Nicoletta

==== Episode 23 ====
Original airdate: November 13, 2020

- Single date: Sia
- Eliminated in Rose ceremony: Stella

=== Week 11 ===
==== Episode 24 ====
Original airdate: November 19, 2020

- Meet Panagiotis's Friends: All the Girls
- Group date: Erietta, Angelina, Vivian

==== Episode 25 ====
Original airdate: November 20, 2020

- Group date: Rafaela, Anna, Angelina, Vivian
- One-on-One Time: Angelina
- Eliminated in Rose ceremony: None

=== Week 12 ===
==== Episode 26 ====
Original airdate: November 25, 2020

- A Night together with the Bachelor: Vivian
- Single date: Nicoletta

==== Episode 27 ====
Original airdate: November 26, 2020

- Group date: Nicoletta, Sia, Erietta, Angelina
- Single date: Angelina

==== Episode 28 ====
Original airdate: November 27, 2020

- Single date: Erietta
- Eliminated in Rose ceremony: Anna

=== Week 13 ===
==== Episode 29 ====
Original airdate: December 3, 2020

- Group date: All the Girls
- Single date: Rafaela

==== Episode 30 ====
Original airdate: December 4, 2020

- Group date: Angelina, Rafaela, Vivian, Sia, Erietta
- Single date: Angelina
- Eliminated in Rose ceremony: Erietta

=== Week 14 ===
==== Episode 31 ====
Original airdate: December 10, 2020

- Single date: Nicoletta

==== Episode 32 ====
Original airdate: December 11, 2020

- Single date: Rafaela
- Eliminated in Rose ceremony: Sia

=== Week 15 ===
==== Episode 33 ====
Original airdate: December 16, 2020

- Hometown #1: Vivian
- Hometown #2: Nicoletta
- Hometown #3: Angelina
- Hometown #4: Rafaela
- Eliminated in Rose ceremony: Rafaela

==== Episode 34 ====
Original airdate: December 17, 2020

- A whole day with the bachelor #1: Vivian
- A whole day with the bachelor #2: Angelina
- A whole day with the bachelor #3: Nicoletta
- Eliminated in Rose ceremony: Angelina

==== Episode 35 ====
Original airdate: December 18, 2020

- Meet Panagiotis's Family #1: Vivian
- Meet Panagiotis's Family #2: Nicoletta
- Final Date #1: Vivian
- Final Date #2: Nicoletta
- Final Decision:
  - Nicoletta is the winner
  - Vivian is the runner-up

== Ratings ==
No. overall	No. in season	Episode	Air date	Timeslot (EET)	Ratings	Viewers (in millions)	Rank		Share		Source
No. overall	No. in season	Episode	Air date	Timeslot (EET)	Ratings	Viewers (in millions)	Daily	Weekly	Household	Adults 18-54	Source
1	1	"Season 1 Premiere"	September 10, 2020	Thursday 10:00pm	6.2%	0.640	#4	#18	17.0%	19.6%	
2	2	"Week 2"	September 17, 2020	Thursday 10:00pm	4.7%	0.483	#10	—N/a^{1}	12.5%	14.2%	
3	3	"Week 2"	September 18, 2020	Friday 10:00pm	—N/a^{2}			—N/a^{1}	9.1%	9.7%	
4	4	"Week 3"	September 23, 2020	Wednesday 10:00pm	4.8%	0.500	#10	—N/a^{1}	12.2%	13.8%	
5	5	"Week 3"	September 24, 2020	Thursday 10:00pm	5.6%	0.580	#7	—N/a^{1}	13.8%	15.5%	
6	6	"Week 3"	September 25, 2020	Friday 10:00pm	6.0%	0.624	#5	—N/a^{1}	13.5%	15.6%	
7	7	"Week 4"	September 30, 2020	Wednesday 10:00pm	5.4%	0.560	#10	—N/a^{1}	12.5%	14.0%	
8	8	"Week 4"	October 1, 2020	Thursday 10:00pm	5.3%	0.549	#10	—N/a^{1}	12.4%	14.5%	
9	9	"Week 4"	October 2, 2020	Friday 10:00pm	5.5%	0.574	#9	—N/a^{1}	12.1%	14.1%	
10	10	"Week 5"	October 7, 2020	Wednesday 10:00pm	5.2%	0.543	#10	—N/a^{1}	12.0%	13.7%	
11	11	"Week 5"	October 8, 2020	Thursday 10:00pm	6.3%	0.653	#7	—N/a^{1}	14.5%	16.6%	
12	12	"Week 5"	October 9, 2020	Friday 10:00pm	5.7%	0.587	#6	—N/a^{1}	11.3%	12.9%	
13	13	"Week 6"	October 14, 2020	Wednesday 10:00pm	5.8%	0.601	#10	—N/a^{1}	12.4%	16.2%	
14	14	"Week 6"	October 15, 2020	Thursday 10:00pm	5.4%	0.557	#10	—N/a^{1}	11.8%	15.4%	
15	15	"Week 6"	October 16, 2020	Friday 10:00pm	5.8%	0.597	#8	—N/a^{1}	12.0%	13.9%	
16	16	"Week 7"	October 22, 2020	Thursday 10:00pm	5.4%	0.559	#9	—N/a^{1}	11.8%	14.7%	
17	17	"Week 7"	October 23, 2020	Friday 10:00pm	5.9%	0.611	#9	—N/a^{1}	12.4%	14.0%	
18	18	"Week 8"	October 29, 2020	Thursday 10:00pm	—N/a^{2}			—N/a^{1}	12.0%	15.4%	
19	19	"Week 8"	October 30, 2020	Friday 10:00pm	6.1%	0.629	#10	—N/a^{1}	13.5%	13.8%	
20	20	"Week 9"	November 5, 2020	Thursday 10:00pm	5.5%	0.570	#9	—N/a^{1}	12.5%	14.3%	
21	21	"Week 9"	November 6, 2020	Friday 10:00pm	—N/a^{2}			—N/a^{1}	11.2%	12.6%	
22	22	"Week 10"	November 12, 2020	Thursday 10:00pm	—N/a^{2}			—N/a^{1}	12.5%	15.6%	
23	23	"Week 10"	November 13, 2020	Friday 10:00pm	7.7%	0.785	#5	—N/a^{1}	15.8%	17.0%	
24	24	"Week 11"	November 19, 2020	Thursday 10:00pm	7.0%	0.720	#8	—N/a^{1}	14.6%	17.5%	
25	25	"Week 11"	November 20, 2020	Friday 10:00pm	8.1%	0.834	#5	—N/a^{1}	16.7%	17.8%	
26	26	"Week 12"	November 25, 2020	Wednesday 10:00pm	6.6%	0.681	#9	—N/a^{1}	14.3%	16.5%	
27	27	"Week 12"	November 26, 2020	Thursday 10:00pm	7.8%	0.804	#7	—N/a^{1}	15.6%	18.2%	
28	28	"Week 12"	November 27, 2020	Friday 10:00pm	9.5%	0.988	#1	#9	19.9%	20.8%	
29	29	"Week 13"	December 3, 2020	Thursday 10:00pm	7.4%	0.762	#6	—N/a^{1}	16.0%	17.7%	
30	30	"Week 13"	December 4, 2020	Friday 10:00pm	9.8%	1.011	#1	#10	20.4%	22.7%	
31	31	"Week 14"	December 10, 2020	Thursday 10:00pm	7.4%	0.765	#9	—N/a^{1}	15.4%	16.3%	
32	32	"Week 14"	December 11, 2020	Friday 10:00pm	9.7%	1.001	#1	#9	20.0%	20.9%	
33	33	"Week 15: Season Finale"	December 16, 2020	Wednesday 10:00pm	8.7%	0.903	#5	—N/a^{1}	18.7%	20.7%	
34	34	"Week 15: Season Finale"	December 17, 2020	Thursday 10:00pm	9.3%	0.967	#3	#17	19.4%	22.2%	
35	35	"Week 15: Season Finale"	December 18, 2020	Friday 10:00pm	11.2%	1.164	#2	#8	23.0%	24.2%	

Note

1. Outside top 20.
2. Outside top 10.
