= The Bachelor (British TV series) series 6 =

The Bachelor
- Series 6
- Starring: Alex Marks
- No. of episodes: 9

Release
- Original network: Channel 5
- Original release: 4 March – 14 March 2019

Series chronology
- ← Previous; Series 5

The Bachelor UK 2019 was the sixth and final series of the reality television series The Bachelor, which ran from 4 March 2019 to 14 March 2019, featuring Alex Marks as "The Bachelor". The series was aired again on Channel 5 and was presented by Mark Wright.

== Description ==
The Bachelor UK last aired in 2012 and returned to Channel 5 on 4 March 2019. The premise of the show involves a single man choosing a winner from 17 single women, by eliminating them one-by-one after going on a series of dates. The bachelor meets the families of the final four women. The final two women meet the parents of the bachelor.

The bachelor for this series was 31 year old Alex Marks, a personal trainer from London.

Alicia Oates from Essex, was declared the winner of the 6th and final series.

== Contestants ==
The 19 contestants were as follows:

Name	Age	Hometown	Occupation	Episode	Place
Alicia Oates	25	Essex	Events coordinator	Winner	1
Charlotte Tyler	30	Brighton/West Sussex	Singer & vocal coach	Entered in Episode 6 Runner-up	2
Charlotte Edwards	36	London	Model	Eliminated in Episode 9	3
Robyn Tollady	28	Wirral	Professional bollywood dancer	Eliminated in Episode 8	4
Annabelle Lawrence	24	Manchester	Swimwear brand owner & designer	Entered in Episode 6 Eliminated in Episode 7	5
Reanne Brown	28	Norwich	Model & entertainer	Quit in Episode 7	6
Georgina "Georgie" Leahy	30	London/Los Angeles	Circus performer	Eliminated in Episode 6	7
Gabriella Pisani	29	London	Journalist	Quit in Episode 6	8
Frankie Maddin	23	Edinburgh	Make-up artist	Eliminated in Episode 6	9
Abbey Carter	26	London	Personal assistant	Eliminated in Episode 5	10-11
Faran Cooper	35	London	Pilates instructor	Voted-out in Episode 1 Returned in Episode 3 Eliminated in Episode 5	10-11
Natasha Mazaheri	28	Essex	Surveyor	Voted-out in Episode 1 Returned in Episode 3 Quit in Episode 5	12
Tara Walls	21	Scotland	Hairdresser	Eliminated in Episode 4	13-14
Tonique Campbell	28	London	Brand manager	Eliminated in Episode 4	13-14
Lilly Douse	24	London	Financial analyst	Eliminated in Episode 3	15
Claudia Sowaha	25	London	Model & belly dancer	Eliminated in Episode 2	16-17
Victoria Bailey	32	Leeds	Account manager	Eliminated in Episode 2	16-17
Lois Bowden	31	Hertfordshire	Company owner	Eliminated in Episode 1	18-19
Chloë Adlerstein	25	London	Yoga teacher	Eliminated in Episode 1	18-19

== Call-Out Order ==
Alex's Call-Out Order
#	Bachelorettes	Episode								
#	Bachelorettes	1	2	3-4	5	6	7	8	9	
1	Abbey	Abbey	Frankie	Reanne	Georgie	Charlotte E.	Charlotte T.	Charlotte T.	Charlotte T.	Alicia
2	Alicia	Georgie	Robyn	Gabriella	Gabriella	Reanne	Robyn	Alicia	Alicia	Charlotte T.
3	Annabelle	Gabriella	Georgie	Alicia	Charlotte E.	Alicia	Alicia	Charlotte E.	Charlotte E.	
4	Charlotte E.	Robyn	Reanne	Georgie	Frankie	Gabriella	Charlotte E.	Robyn		
5	Charlotte T.	Frankie	Alicia	Charlotte E.	Alicia	Charlotte T.	Annabelle			
6	Chloë	Claudia	Gabriella	Natasha	Reanne	Robyn	Reanne			
7	Claudia	Reanne	Charlotte E.	Abbey	Robyn	Annabelle				
8	Faran	Tara	Lilly	Faran	Abbey; Faran	Georgie				
9	Frankie	Lilly	Abbey	Robyn	Abbey; Faran	Frankie				
10	Gabriella	Victoria	Tonique	Frankie	Natasha					
11	Georgie	Alicia	Tara	Tara; Tonique						
12	Lilly	Charlotte E.	Claudia; Victoria	Tara; Tonique						
13	Lois	Tonique	Claudia; Victoria	Lilly						
14	Natasha	Lois; Chloë								
15	Reanne	Lois; Chloë								
16	Robyn	Faran; Natasha								
17	Tara	Faran; Natasha								
18	Tonique									
19	Victoria									

The contestant was eliminated at the rose ceremony
The contestant was given a white rose
The contestant went on two-on-one date and was given a rose prior to the Rose Ceremony
The contestant was on a one-on-one date and was eliminated
The contestant was given a rose at the Rose Ceremony and rejected it
The contestant was on a two-on-one date and got eliminated
The contestant was given a rose prior to the Rose Ceremony
The contestant was eliminated outside the rose ceremony
The contestant quit the competition
The contestant won the competition

== Reception ==
Mel Evans of The Metro described previous series as "tired, predictable and a little offensive" but the new show as having "exceeded all expectations I had". She was impressed that three women, Gabriella Pisani, Natasha Mazaheri and Reanne Brown, rejected the bachelor and chose to leave the series.
