= The Bachelor New Zealand season 3 =

The Bachelor New Zealand
- Season 3
- Starring: Zac Franich
- Presented by: Dominic Bowden
- No. of contestants: 22
- Winner: Viarni Bright
- Runner-up: Lily McNamus-Semchyshyn
- No. of episodes: 19

Release
- Original network: Three
- Original release: March 19 – May 22, 2017

Season chronology
- ← Previous; Season 2

The third season of The Bachelor New Zealand premiered on March 19, 2017. This season stars Zac Franich, a 28 year old lifeguard and sprint kayaker from the Hibiscus Coast, courting 22 women.

== Contestants ==
The season began with 19 contestants. In Episode 7, three "intruders" were brought into the competition, bringing the total number of contestants to 22.

Name	Age	Hometown	Occupation	Eliminated
Viarni Bright	22	Mount Maunganui	National Account Manager	Winner
Lily McManus-Semchyshyn	20	Darwin, Australia	Snowboard Instructor	Runner-Up
Claudia Hoskins	21	Auckland	Aspiring Interior Designer	Episode 17
Hannah Howley	29	Invercargill	Account Executive	Episode 15
Sarah Whales-Martin	28	Christchurch	Earthquake Claims Technician	Episode 14 (Quit)
Belinda "Bel" Clarke	25	Christchurch	Travel and Tourism	Episode 13
Vanessa Bingham	26	Christchurch	Sales	Episode 13
Karina Grant	23	Auckland	Law Student	Episode 12
Ally Thompson	22	Nelson	Yoga Instructor, Cosmetic Tattooist	Episode 11
Jessica "Jess" Nutley	23	Hull, England	Events Marketing Coordinator	Episode 10
Rosie Wood	23	Christchurch	Psychology student	Episode 10
Molly Littlejohn	24	Wellington	Preschool Teacher	Episode 9
Nina Weil	23	Christchurch	Freelance Graphic Designer	Episode 8
Lucia Tabaillou	21	Auckland	Nursing Student	Episode 7
Sophie Russo	26	Te Pahu	Sales and Marketing Coordinator	Episode 6
Katey Freestone	21	Auckland	Film School Graduate	Episode 5
Stephanie Lai	24	Auckland	Law Student	Episode 4
Taylar Saunders	23	Christchurch	Credit and Loan Officer	Episode 4
Mariana Morrison	31	Rotorua	Business Studies Lecturer	Episode 3
Charlotte Bullock	24	Auckland	Account Manager	Episode 2
Elaina	26	Bangkok, Thailand	Early Childhood Teacher	Episode 2
Monique Thomas-Long	25	Wellington	Sales Area Manager	Episode 2

== Call-out order ==
Zac's call-out order
#	Bachelorettes	Episode															
#	Bachelorettes	1/2	3	4	5	6	7	8	9	10	11	12	13	14 (Note: There was no rose ceremony due to Sarah's decision to eliminate herself. Therefore, the remaining contestants are listed in alphabetical order.)	15	16/17	18
1	Viarni	Viarni	Jess	Viarni	Claudia	Bel	Hannah	Rosie	Viarni	Claudia	Lily	Lily	Viarni	Lily	Lily	Lily	Viarni
2	Katey	Claudia	Ally	Rosie	Ally	Lily	Sarah	Lily	Jess	Sarah	Viarni	Sarah	Claudia	Claudia	Viarni	Viarni	Lily
3	Nina	Jess	Lily	Hannah	Hannah	Viarni	Rosie	Sarah	Karina	Lily	Claudia	Bel	Hannah	Hannah	Claudia	Claudia	
4	Stephanie	Molly	Sophie	Katey	Viarni	Rosie	Viarni	Karina	Bel	Ally	Bel	Vanessa	Sarah	Viarni	Hannah		
5	Lucia	Hannah	Bel	Bel	Bel	Hannah	Karina	Viarni	Hannah	Vanessa	Sarah	Hannah	Lily	Sarah			
6	Sophie	Rosie	Claudia	Nina	Lily	Claudia	Nina	Vanessa	Vanessa	Bel	Hannah	Viarni	Vanessa				
7	Jess	Lily	Lucia	Jess	Jess	Molly	Ally	Molly	Ally	Karina	Karina	Claudia	Bel				
8	Molly	Lucia	Rosie	Lily	Rosie	Lucia	Claudia	Claudia	Sarah	Viarni	Vanessa	Karina					
9	Charlotte	Bel	Viarni	Sophie	Nina	Nina	Lily	Ally	Lily	Hannah	Ally						
10	Lily	Nina	Hannah	Molly	Sophie	Jess	Bel	Hannah	Claudia	Jess							
11	Bel	Mariana	Taylar	Claudia	Lucia	Ally	Molly	Jess	Rosie	Rosie							
12	Monique	Katey	Katey	Ally	Molly	Sophie	Jess	Bel	Molly								
13	Claudia	Stephanie	Stephanie	Lucia	Katey		Vanessa	Nina									
14	Rosie	Ally	Nina	Stephanie			Lucia										
15	Elaina	Sophie	Molly	Taylar													
16	Ally	Taylar	Mariana														
17	Taylar	Charlotte															
18	Mariana	Elaina															
19	Hannah	Monique															
20	Karina (Note: This contestant was an intruder and did not join the competition until Episode 7.)																
21	Sarah																
22	Vanessa																

The contestant received the white rose.
The contestant received a rose during a date.
The contestant was eliminated.
The contestant was eliminated during the date
This contestant received a rose outside of a date or the rose ceremony
The contestant quit the competition.
The contestant was eliminated outside the rose ceremony.
The contestant won the competition.

== Episodes ==
No.	Title	Original release date
1	"Episode 1"	19 March 2017
No rose ceremony, week one is continued on episode 2.
2	"Episode 2"	20 March 2017
Viarni received the white, first impression, rose. Charlotte, Monique, and Elaina are eliminated.
3	"Episode 3"	26 March 2017
Jess received the first single date. Ally received the rose on the group date. Mariana is eliminated.
4	"Episode 4"	27 March 2017
Viarni uses her white rose to go on a one-on-one date, meaning that Bel loss her chance at a one-on-one date with Zac in this episode. Double elimination occurs at the rose ceremony, and Stephanie and Taylar are eliminated.
5	"Episode 5"	2 April 2017
Claudia has the first kiss with the bachelor on her single date and receive a rose on the date. Katey is eliminated.
6	"Episode 6"	3 April 2017
Bel receives rose on her one-on-one date and Lily and Viarni receive roses outside of the rose ceremony. Sophie is eliminated from the show.
7	"Episode 7"	9 April 2017
Vanessa, Sarah, and Karina are introduced as intruders onto to the show. Hannah and Sarah receive roses on their one-on-one dates. Lucia is eliminated.
8	"Episode 8"	10 April 2017
Rosie and Lily receive roses at the cocktail party. Nina is eliminated from the show.
9	"Episode 9"	17 April 2017
Jess and Karina receive roses at the cocktail party. Molly is eliminated.
10	"Episode 10"	23 April 2017
Sarah and Claudia receive roses on dates. Lily receives a rose at the cocktail party. Double elimination occurs, and Rosie and Jess are eliminated.
11	"Episode 11"	24 April 2017
Lily receives rose on one-on-one date. Ally is eliminated.
12	"Episode 12"	30 April 2017
13	"Episode 13"	1 May 2017
14	"Episode 14"	7 May 2017
15	"Episode 15"	8 May 2017
16	"Episode 16"	14 May 2017
17	"Episode 17"	15 May 2017
18	"Episode 18"	21 May 2017
19	"Women Tell All"	22 May 2017
