= The Bachelor (Greek TV series) season 2 =

The Bachelor
- Season 2
- Starring: Alexis Pappas

Release
- Original network: Alpha TV
- Original release: September 7, 2021 – present

Season chronology
- ← Previous; Season 1

The 2nd season of The Bachelor premiered on September 7, 2021 on Alpha TV. This season featured the second greek bachelor, 35-year-old Alexis Pappas from Northern Epirus, he has worked as a model both in Greece and abroad, having in his CV collaborations with brands such as Davidoff, Mont Blanc, Intimissimi, Guess, Armani and Diesel. He has also worked as an actor, in television and cinema, with his best known television participation in the series 8 Lexis in the 2019-2020 season. In the period 2020-2021 he took part in the eighth season of the Survivor Greece, becoming particularly well known to the general public.

== Contestants ==
Name	Age	Hometown	Occupation	Arrived	Outcome	Place
Athena Thea Vas	30	New York	Fitness Influencer	Week 1	Winner	1
Anna Zeniou	20	Nicosia	Private employee	Week 1	Runner-up	2
Giota Dimitrova	23	Thrace	Fashion Designer	Week 1	Week 15	3
Izabela Pavlidou	30	Thessaloniki	Singer	Week 1	Week 15	4
Maria Fotou	23	Icaria	Fashion Model	Week 6	Week 14	5
Athina Sindou	33	Amaliada	Businesswoman	Week 1	Week 13	6
Helena Papamethodiou	28	Nicosia	Marketing Management	Week 1	Week 13	7
Fenia Arampatzi	26	Thessaloniki	Kindergarten Teacher	Week 1	Week 12	8
Ioanna Idrizi	22	Kefalonia	Mixologist	Week 1	Week 11	9
Lena Feslioglou	24	Patras	Coach	Week 4	Week 10	10
Dina Panagopoulou	19	Kavala	Physics Student & Latin Dance Champion	Week 1	Week 10	11
Tzortzina Pappa	26	Athens	Model	Week 4	Week 9	12
Nikol Maraki	42	Kavala	Travel Agent	Week 1	Week 8	13
Elen Pagkali	24	Thessaloniki	Philology	Week 4	Week 8	14
Stavy Pagoni	21	Santorini	Esthetician	Week 1	Week 7	15
Natasa Karasarini	22	Athens	Private employee	Week 1	Week 6	16
Fay Tsaprouni	26	Corinth	Nail Technician	Week 1	Week 5	17
Marianthi Boura	20	Mytilene	Nursing Teacher	Week 1	Week 4	18
Vaso Stifoudi	24	Didymoteicho	Digital Μarketing Specialist	Week 1	Week 3	19
Andrea Ploutarxou	26	Paphos	Chemical Engineer	Week 1	Week 3	20
Irene Katsigianni	19	Athens	Primary and Community Health Student	Week 1	Week 2	21
Valeria Merakou	28	Athens	Author	Week 1	Week 1	22
Laoura	19	Rhodes	Bartender	Week 1	Week 1	23
Dora Kinali	22	Serres	Dancer	Week 1	Week 1	24–25
Lena Nikolarakou	22	Trikala	Aclogist	Week 1	Week 1	24–25

== Call-out order ==
The contestant received a first impression rose
The contestant received a rose during the date
The contestant was eliminated
The contestant was eliminated outside the rose ceremony
The contestant was eliminated during the date
The contestant was given a rose at the Rose Ceremony and rejected it
The contestant quit the competition
The contestant won the competition

== Ratings ==
No. overall	No. in season	Episode	Air date	Timeslot (EET)	Ratings	Viewers (in millions)	Rank		Share		Source
No. overall	No. in season	Episode	Air date	Timeslot (EET)	Ratings	Viewers (in millions)	Daily	Weekly	Household	Adults 18-54	Source
36	1	"Season 2 Premiere"	September 7, 2021	Tuesday 9:20pm	6.2%	0.640	#3	#14	15.9%	18.2%	
37	2	"Week 2"	September 8, 2021	Wednesday 9:20pm	4.9%	0.505	#8	—N/a^{1}	11.1%	14.8%	
38	3	"Week 2"	September 9, 2021	Thursday 9:20pm	4.6%	0.472	#8	—N/a^{1}	10.9%	13.6%	
39	4	"Week 2"	September 10, 2021	Friday 9:00pm	5.6%	0.581	#2	#15	15.7%	16.2%	
40	5	"Week 3"	September 15, 2021	Wednesday 10:20pm	4.4%	0.456	#6	—N/a^{1}	13.0%	13.7%	
41	6	"Week 3"	September 16, 2021	Thursday 10:20pm	5.4%	0.560	#3	#17	16.7%	17.1%	
42	7	"Week 3"	September 17, 2021	Friday 9:00pm	5.0%	0.519	#1	—N/a^{1}	14.6%	13.8%	
43	8	"Week 4"	September 22, 2021	Wednesday 10:20pm	4.9%	0.511	#7		14.1%	12.2%	
44	9	"Week 4"	September 23, 2021	Thursday 10:20pm	5.2%	0.535	#5		15.0%	13.3%	
45	10	"Week 4"	September 24, 2021	Friday 9:00pm					12.8%	13.2%	

Note

1. Outside top 20.
