= The Bachelor New Zealand season 2 =

The Bachelor New Zealand
- Season 2
- Starring: Jordan Mauger
- Presented by: Mike Puru
- No. of contestants: 23
- Winner: Fleur Verhoeven
- Runner-up: Nazanin "Naz" Khanjani
- No. of episodes: 19

Release
- Original network: TV3
- Original release: March 7 – May 10, 2016

Season chronology
- ← Previous; Season 1 Next → Season 3

The second season of The Bachelor New Zealand stars Jordan Mauger, a 32 year old television and film producer. The season contains 23 bachelorettes and premiered on March 7, 2016.

== Contestants ==
The following is the list of bachelorettes for Season Two:

Name	Age	Hometown	Job	Eliminated
Fleur Verhoeven	26	Waipawa	Youth worker	Winner
Nazanin "Naz" Khanjani	25	Christchurch	Landscaper	Episode 19
Erin Higgins	26	Auckland	Super yacht masseuse	Episode 18
Gabrielle Davenport	29	Kerikeri	Marketing manager	Episode 16
Kate Cameron	28	Auckland	Account manager	Episode 15
Storm Halkett	24	Fairlie	Travel consultant	Episode 14
Ceri McVinnie	24	Auckland	Early childhood teacher	Episode 13
Rebecca Trelease	33	Auckland	Retirement village attendant	Episode 12
Sarah Wallace	30	Christchurch	Hairdresser	Episode 11
Shari Flavall	24	Paraparaumu	Early childhood teacher	Episode 10
Alicia Cowan	26	Te Awamutu	File management officer	Episode 9
Lara Christie	27	Tauranga	Marketing manager	Episode 8
Nicole Hunwick	24	Hamilton	Veterinarian	Quit Episode 8
Danielle McGough	26	Pukekohe	Cruise consultant	Episode 7
Claudia Conaglen	29	Orewa	Model/fashion designer	Episode 6
Amanda Higgot	28	Waikanae	Nursing student	Episode 5
Lindsey Harbour	32	Auckland	Doctor	Episode 4
Anna Marshall	29	Nelson	Nanny	Episode 3
Metotisi "Metz" Komiti-Faalavaau	28	Auckland	Administrator	Quit Episode 3
Catherine Lum	26	Auckland	Ambulance customer service	Episode 2
Emily Rose	33	Auckland	Pilates instructor	Episode 1
Freya Jones	26	Christchurch	Business administrator	Episode 1
Harmony Moki	27	Auckland	Jockey	Episode 1

== Call-out order ==
Rank	Contestants	Episode																	
Rank	Contestants	1	2	3	4	5	6	7	8	9	10	11	12	13	14	15	16	18	(Note: There was no rose ceremony in episode 17.)19
1	Alicia	Rebecca	Sarah	Storm	Fleur	Lara	Rebecca	Ceri	Fleur	Naz	Erin	Storm	Gabrielle	Fleur	Naz	Erin	Erin	Naz	Fleur
2	Amanda	Kate	Fleur	Shari	Shari	Kate	Erin	Gabrielle	Gabrielle	Kate	Ceri	Kate	Erin	Erin	Gabrielle	Fleur	Fleur	Fleur	Naz
3	Anna	Amanda	Lara	Ceri	Erin	Fleur	Storm	Lara	Sarah	Fleur	Storm	Fleur	Ceri	Naz	Erin	Gabrielle	Naz	Erin	
4	Catherine	Nicole	Nicole	Alicia	Storm	Rebecca	Gabrielle	Fleur	Naz	Ceri	Naz	Gabrielle	Storm	Kate	Kate	Naz	Gabrielle		
5	Ceri	Storm	Naz	Fleur	Claudia	Ceri	Naz	Kate	Erin	Shari	Fleur	Naz	Fleur	Storm	Fleur	Kate			
6	Claudia	Catherine	Anna	Nicole	Danielle	Nicole	Sarah	Storm	Shari	Rebecca	Kate	Ceri	Kate	Gabrielle	Storm				
7	Danielle	Danielle	Storm	Erin	Lara	Storm	Kate	Rebecca	Ceri	Erin	Sarah	Rebecca	Naz	Ceri					
8	Emily Rose	Sarah	Rebecca	Gabrielle	Kate	Naz	Fleur	Alicia	Storm	Storm	Rebecca	Erin	Rebecca						
9	Erin	Gabrielle	Ceri	Kate	Nicole	Sarah	Lara	Nicole	Rebecca	Gabrielle	Gabrielle	Sarah							
10	Fleur	Fleur	Alicia	Danielle	Alicia	Danielle	Ceri	Naz	Alicia	Sarah	Shari								
11	Freya	Lindsey	Kate	Naz	Gabrielle	Claudia	Danielle	Shari	Kate	Alicia									
12	Gabrielle	Shari	Erin	Rebecca	Rebecca	Erin	Alicia	Erin	Lara										
13	Harmony	Anna	Danielle	Lindsey	Amanda	Alicia	Nicole	Sarah	Nicole										
14	Kate	Metz	Amanda	Claudia	Ceri	Shari	Shari	Danielle											
15	Lara	Alicia	Gabrielle	Lara	Naz	Gabrielle	Claudia												
16	Lindsey	Ceri	Lindsey	Amanda	Sarah	Amanda													
17	Metz	Claudia	Claudia	Sarah	Lindsey														
18	Nicole	Erin	Shari	Anna															
19	Naz	Naz	Metz	Metz															
20	Rebecca	Lara	Catherine																
21	Sarah	Emily Rose																	
22	Shari	Freya																	
23	Storm	Harmony																	

This contestant won
This contestant received one of the first impression roses
This contestant received a rose during the date
This contestant received a rose outside of a date or the rose ceremony
This contestant was eliminated
This contestant quit

== Episodes ==
Episode 1

The bachelorettes arrived at the mansion and the first rose ceremony took place.

Eliminated: Emily Rose, Freya & Harmony

Episode 2

Single Date: Sarah - Went wakeboarding and had ice-cream atop the Skytower.

Group Date: Fleur, Storm, Anna, Kate, Gabrielle, Erin & Danielle - Played beach volleyball and had a BBQ. Fleur got some one on one time and received a rose.

Eliminated: Catherine

Episode 3

Single Date: Storm - Went kayaking and spent the evening on a yacht.

Group Date: Nicole, Alicia, Anna, Amanda & Naz - Washed dogs and had a water fight. Took Nicole for some one on one time.

Eliminated: Anna

Quit: Metz

Episode 4

Single Date: Shari - Went to the Auckland Art Gallery and toured it alone together and had dinner.

Group Date: Lindsey, Gabrielle, Nicole, Naz, Erin, Lara, Danielle, Alicia, Rebecca, Claudia, Kate & Amanda - Went paintballing. Erin had some one on one time with Jordan.

Eliminated: Lindsey

Episode 5

Group Date: Danielle, Lara, Sarah, Ceri & Gabrielle - Raced Suzuki Swifts around Hampton Downs racetrack. Lara was the fastest and got some one on one time with Jordan and received a rose.

Single Date: Kate - Went horseback riding along the beach and had wine and cheese in a glade where Kate was given a rose.

Eliminated: Amanda

Episode 6

Group Date: Gabrielle, Naz & Claudia - Took a speedboat onto the water and went jetskiing. Gabrielle got some one on one time and she and Jordan got closer.

Single Date: Rebecca - Went on a theme park date at Rainbow's End.

Eliminated: Claudia

Episode 7

The remaining bachelorettes flew with Jordan to Hawaii.

Single Date: Ceri - Strolled along the beach and had a picnic inside when it started to rain. Then Ceri got her dream date of a helicopter ride over Hawaii.

Group Date: Fleur, Sarah, Shari, Alicia, Lara, Storm & Nicole - Split into teams and went catamaran racing. He picked Alicia for some one on one time.

Eliminated: Danielle

Episode 8

Single Date: Fleur - Visited a Hawaiian volcano and had dinner together.

Group Date: Naz, Nicole, Gabrielle, Kate & Erin - Went quad-biking and then zip lining through the Hawaiian jungle. Took Gabrielle for some one on one time.

Quit: Nicole

Eliminated: Lara

Episode 9

Single Date: Naz - Had a flight in a seaplane. Took a speedboat out into the ocean.

Group Date: Sarah, Shari, Storm, Rebecca & Kate - Had a luau.

Eliminated: Alicia

Episode 10

Single Date: Erin - Took a sailboat out into the ocean and went snorkeling. After sunset they watched fireworks.

Group Date: Rebecca, Ceri, Sarah & Gabrielle - Went foraging for their own food in the countryside and had a chef cook for them. Rebecca was taken away for some one on one time.

Eliminated: Shari

Episode 11

Jordan and the bachelorettes head to sunny Brisbane, Australia.

Single Date: Storm - They go into the bush where a luxury tent is set up where they eat and have a couples massage down by the river with lanterns all around.

Group Date: Gabrielle, Kate & Sarah - Went abseiling, where Gabs faced her fear of heights and Sarah refused to partake. Kate was taken for some one on one time where they go kayaking.

Eliminated: Sarah

Episode 12

Single Date: Gabrielle - Took a helicopter to a lodge in the hillside where they had dinner and got cozy in the Jacuzzi.

Group Date - Storm, Fleur, Naz, Kate & Erin - Went horseback riding and corralled cows. Naz got some one on one time with Jordan.

Eliminated: Rebecca

Episode 13

Single Date: Ceri - Took a ride in a classic convertible car, something Jordan is passionate about.

Group Date: Ceri, Naz, Erin, Gabrielle, Kate, Storm & Fleur - Go to Australia Zoo to interact with Australian wildlife. Fleur got some one on one time at the zoo with Jordan.

Eliminated: Ceri

Episode 14

Jordan and the remaining bachelorettes left Brisbane and travelled to the Bay of Islands back in New Zealand.

Single Date: Naz - Hiked up a trail and enjoyed the view together. Watched the sun set and swam and the ocean.

Group Date: Gabrielle, Kate & Fleur - Went kayaking together and ended the paddle with a view of a beautiful waterfall. Gabrielle was taken for some one on one time with Jordan.

Eliminated: Storm

Episode 15

Single date: Kate - Kate and Jordan enjoyed a pub lunch together followed by paragliding.

Group Date: Naz, Erin & Fleur - Heading out on a tall ship together. Fleur was taken for some one on one time with Jordan.

Eliminated: Kate

Episode 16

Single date: Erin

Group Date: Naz & Gabrielle - Biking. Each got some one on one time with Jordan

Eliminated: Gabrielle
