= April Brockman - Del Monte =

Canadian reality television personality

- Born: 29 May 1986 (age 40); Toronto, Ontario
- Citizenship: Canada
- Occupations: Reality Television Personality, Author and Realtor
- Known for: Winner of The Bachelor Canada (season 2)
- Website: www.aprildelmonte.com

April Brockman - Del Monte (born May 29, 1986) is a Canadian reality television personality who received international recognition as the winner of The Bachelor Canada in season two.

== Life and career ==
April was cast on the Canadian television series, The Bachelor Canada. In 2014, she won season 2 of the Canadian reality television series which aired on the W Network. Prior to being a television personality, she built a career in the real estate industry.

In May 2020, April published her first book titled How to Thrive as a Real Estate Agent. In February 2022, she founded The 6 Figure Realtor Program and also created informative blog series & social media community tagged Women Who Thrive In Real Estate.

== Personal life ==
In December 2017, April became engaged to Canadian Film Director, Michael Del Monte and creator of award-winning film Transformer. They were married on June 30, 2018 and later had a baby boy in 2019.

== See also ==
- The Bachelor Canada
- The Bachelor Canada (season 2)
