= Gavin Henson =

Welsh international rugby union player (born 1982)

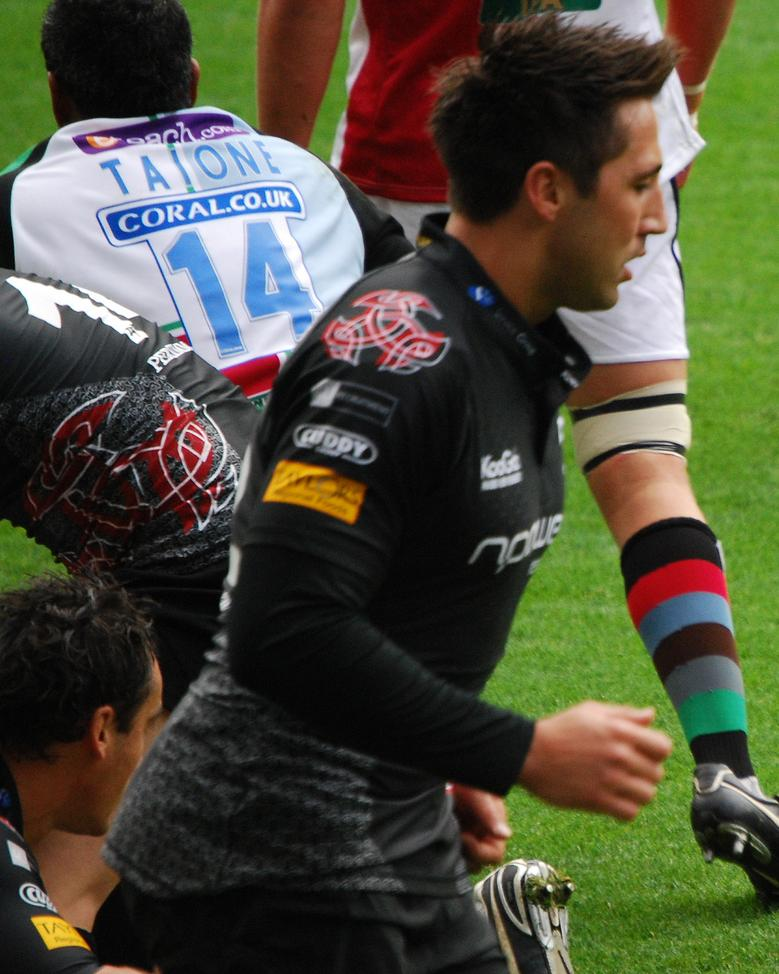
- Born: Gavin Lloyd Henson; 1 February 1982 (age 44) Pencoed, Mid Glamorgan, Wales
- Height: 183 cm (6 ft 0 in)
- Weight: 93 kg (205 lb; 14 st 9 lb)
- School: Plas-y-Felin Primary School, Brynteg Comprehensive, Bridgend, Wales

Rugby union career
- Position(s): Fly half Centre; Fullback
Senior career
Years	Team	Apps	(Points)
2000	Llanelli	1	(5)
2000–2003	Swansea	57	(391)
2003–2009	Ospreys	98	(778)
2010–2011	Saracens	3	(0)
2011	Toulon	3	(5)
2011–2012	Cardiff Blues	8	(0)
2012–2013	London Welsh	9	(67)
2013–2015	Bath	35	(72)
2015–2017	Bristol	27	(271)
2017–2019	Dragons	15	(98)
2024	Pencoed	1	(5)
- Correct as of 16 September 2024
International career
Years	Team	Apps	(Points)
2001–2011	Wales	33	(130)
2005	British and Irish Lions	1	(0)
- Rugby league career

Playing information
Club
Years	Team	Pld	T	G	FG	P
2021	West Wales	1	0	0	0	0

Gavin Lloyd Henson (born 1 February 1982) is a Welsh former professional rugby union player, who played as a fly-half, fullback and inside centre.

Between 2000 and 2019 he played for Llanelli, Swansea RFC, the Ospreys, Saracens, Toulon, Cardiff Blues, London Welsh, Bath, Bristol and the Dragons.

He won 33 caps for Wales national team and one for the British & Irish Lions. He was part of a Wales team which won Grand Slams in the Six Nations Championship in 2005 and 2008. He played for the British & Irish Lions in their 2005 tour to New Zealand.

Since 2010, Henson has participated in several reality television series: 71 Degrees North, Strictly Come Dancing, The Bachelor and Celebrity Hunted. In 2021 he began playing rugby league for West Wales Raiders in League 1.

== Rugby career ==
=== Llanelli RFC: 2000 ===
Henson's one and only appearance for Llanelli RFC was against the then Border Reivers at Greenyards in May 2000. The Rievers won the match 51–23. Henson played at 10 and scored 5 points (1 conversion & 1 penalty).

=== Swansea/Ospreys: 2000–2009 ===
Born in Pencoed, Henson played rugby for his school, Brynteg Comprehensive, in Bridgend, Wales. Despite his Bridgend origins, he joined Swansea RFC at the age of 18. He was presented with the International Rugby Board's Young Player of the Year award in 2001. During this time, he had started paving the way to his international career by signing for the Wales A team. He made his international debut for Wales during June 2001 in a Test against Japan, coming off the bench. He then started his next match, at fly-half in a game against Romania on 19 September 2001. In November of that year, he played for Wales A against Uruguay, scoring his first try in an international.

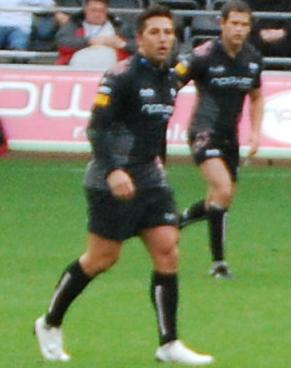
Henson in action for the Ospreys

In 2003, regional rugby was launched in Wales, and Henson played for the Ospreys. He made his debut for the Ospreys as a substitute on 9 September 2003 in a match against Ulster, scoring two tries and kicking both a penalty and conversion to score 15 points. He was moved to fly-half for the subsequent match against the Newport-Gwent Dragons, scoring 14 points from kicks. Henson returned to the international field for Wales in 2003. He played twice, and was on the bench for two other Tests. He was capped against both the All Blacks and Romania.

Henson came to wider notice in 2004 with a series of performances in Wales' autumn internationals against New Zealand and South Africa. Henson became a firm part of the Welsh starting line-up, and after playing at fullback in the second Test against Argentina and the first against South Africa, he played in the centres for the remainder of the season.

He remained on the team for the 2005 Six Nations Championship. In Wales' opening fixture in February, at home to England, Henson gave an effective performance; making two tackles on Mathew Tait (earning Tait the nickname 'Henson's Handbag') and landing the match-winning points with a 48 m penalty kick and being named man of the match. Back in his club side, Henson was part of a team which took the Celtic League cup: in the deciding match against Edinburgh on 26 March 2005, he scored 24 of his side's 29 points.

In the northern hemisphere summer of the same year, Henson was named in the Lions squad for the tour of New Zealand. He was "devastated not to be playing" in the first Test. When he was selected for the second test, he was injured and could not play in the final test. A groin injury delayed his return to club rugby in the autumn of the year. Within months of his Ospreys return, Henson was cited for kicking and elbowing Leicester prop Alex Moreno in a game against Leicester on 19 December 2005. He was found not guilty of the kicking offence, but guilty of the elbowing. He was initially suspended for ten weeks and two days: this period was reduced on appeal to seven weeks. Following this suspension and a single game at club level, he returned to international rugby against Ireland.

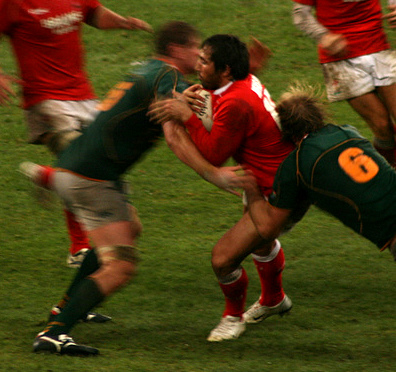
Henson in action for Wales.

In October 2005, Henson's My Grand Slam Year was published. Comments about the Lions tour and remarks about other players ensured rapid publicity and Henson had to apologise to his teammates. He was not selected in the Wales squad for the 2007 Rugby World Cup by then coach Gareth Jenkins, after he failed to prove his fitness after recovering from an Achilles tendon injury.

Henson was recalled to the Welsh Squad by caretaker coach Nigel Davies, to play against South Africa shortly after the 2007 Rugby World Cup. He then started for of all of Wales 2008 Six Nations Championship games, Wales then went on to win the Grand Slam for the second time in four seasons. Henson lost his first 6 Nations match in which he started on 21 March 2009 as Ireland beat Wales in Cardiff 17–15, to win the Grand Slam.

=== Sabbatical: 2009–2010 ===
On 13 July 2009, British tabloid, The Sun, announced that Henson planned to retire immediately from rugby. On 14 July 2009, Henson and the Ospreys issued a joint statement denying the player had any intention of quitting. Henson said, "I've certainly been having difficulties with the recurring injury but I have absolutely no intention of quitting the game".

In 2009, Mike Turner of the Crusaders RL (who at that time played in the Super League) stated that if Henson ever thought of switching to rugby league the club would be happy to talk to him. Since this time, Henson has made no official statement on the subject, shown any intent with regard to joining a Super League club or held any talks with the Crusaders, although he regularly attended their matches in 2009.

=== Comeback: 2010–2019 ===
On 27 October 2010, Ospreys released a statement from managing director, Mike Cuddy, stating that Henson would be released from his contract with the province with immediate effect, and that he would be returning to rugby with the English club Saracens. Henson had not played professional Rugby for 18 months before this announcement following his period of unpaid leave from the Ospreys. Henson had been reported as having trained with Saracens two days prior to this announcement on 25 October 2010, leading to speculation that the return to professional rugby was imminent. Henson's agent, Matt Ginvert, stated that Henson will return to Rugby after completing his commitments with the BBC's Strictly Come Dancing programme, and Saracens chief executive Edward Griffiths said that he saw no reason why Henson would not compete for the club before Christmas 2010. Henson signed for Saracens in October 2010, making his debut at Wembley Stadium in the Boxing Day 2010 match against London Wasps; his first competitive game since March 2009. After playing four games for Saracens, starting only one, Henson was released from his contract on 2 February 2011.

The same day, French sports newspaper L'Equipe reported that Henson had met RC Toulonnais head coach Philippe Saint-André and club owner Mourad Boudjellal, for lunch in Toulon. The club, with their two first choice fly-halves out injured, had an available space in their squad under Top 14 regulations. Henson had commented while at Saracens that he was frustrated not to be playing in his preferred position. The following day, he signed a five-month contract with RC Toulonnais. In April 2011, he was suspended for two weeks following an incident on a night out after a match against Toulouse, involving an alleged fight with his teammates. After a hearing, RC Toulonnais President Boudjellal decided to reintegrate Henson back into the squad. However, on 24 May 2011, Henson was released by RC Toulonnais.

On 4 June 2011, Henson played his first match for Wales in 2 years, starting against the Barbarians, Henson put in a good performance, although he described his match as merely "showing glimpses of what he can do". The match was a loss to the Barbarians, with Isa Nacewa scoring a try in the 79th minute, taking the score from 28–26 to Wales to 28–31 to the Barbarians. After the Barbarian match, Henson was named in the 45-man preliminary 2011 Rugby World Cup squad by new Wales coach Warren Gatland. On 11 August 2011, Henson started for Wales in a warmup test against rivals England at Millennium Stadium, but left late in the first half after dislocating his wrist. The following day, it was announced that surgery on his wrist would keep him out for six to eight weeks, and that he would not be available for the pool stages of the World Cup.

In October 2011, it was announced by his agent and subsequently various media outlets, that Henson had signed for the Cardiff Blues. The club later confirmed the 8-month deal. On 2 April 2012, it was announced by Cardiff Blues that his contract had been terminated by the club after he was reported to be drinking and behaving inappropriately on a flight home from Scotland after a Blues match against Glasgow Warriors. The airline Flybe, which Henson was flying with, banned him from the airline for a six-month period.

On 9 July 2012, newly promoted London Welsh announced that they had signed Henson for the 2012/13 season. On 13 June 2013, it was announced that Henson was to leave London Welsh, who had been relegated that year, to join Bath for the next season. He said "I am thrilled to be joining Bath this summer, and I look forward to becoming part of what looks a very exciting squad. I still very much want to be playing at the highest level, and Bath is a big Club with big plans. I know what is expected of me and I can't wait to get started." On 10 July 2013, Henson was knocked out by Bath teammate Carl Fearns on a night out in the city.

Having improved his recent form with Bath, including influential appearances in the centre. Due to this improved form Henson, reportedly, rejected an approach by the Newport Gwent Dragons to sign an extension to his Bath contract.

Henson had been included in the Probables squad for the Wales trial match on 30 May 2014 in Swansea but was unable to take part due to Premier Rugby Limited's (the governing body of the English premiership) decision not to release non English players outside the IRB test window.

On 23 January 2015, it was announced Henson would be leaving Bath to join RFU Championship side Bristol, at the end of the Aviva Premiership season on a one-year deal. However, on 11 February, he was released four months early from his Bath contract to take his place in the Bristol ranks, being replaced at Bath by incoming London Irish utility back Tom Homer.

On 14 March 2017, Henson returned to Wales to sign for the Dragons, back in the Pro14, on a two-year contract from the 2017–18 season.

=== International tries ===
Try	Opponent	Location	Venue	Date	Result
1	South Africa	Cardiff, Wales	Millennium Stadium	6 November 2004	Loss
2	South Africa	Cardiff, Wales	Millennium Stadium	6 November 2004	Loss
3	Romania	Cardiff, Wales	Millennium Stadium	12 November 2004	Win

=== Rugby league ===
After being released by the Dragons at the end of the 2018–2019 season, Henson retired and purchased a pub. On 18 September 2020 it was announced that he was joining rugby league team West Wales Raiders who play in league's third tier.

He made his début in a 4–58 home defeat to Widnes Vikings in a Challenge Cup tie on 21 March 2021, but has not featured since.

== In popular media ==
In September 2010, he featured in the ITV1 outdoor series 71 Degrees North, a challenge show set in Norway in which he finished in 2nd place, losing out to Marcus Patric. He then featured as a contestant on BBC1's Strictly Come Dancing's eighth series, partnered by Katya Virshilas. In August 2011 a series, The Bachelor, in which 25 young women battle it out on the French Riviera to win the heart of Henson "the Bachelor", began on Channel 5. He has been criticised for these appearances in the press and by many rugby fans.

Henson is referenced in the 2010 parody song "Newport (Ymerodraeth State of Mind)", although another South Wales band, Goldie Lookin Chain, in a wider critique of the song, noted that Henson "rarely ventured to Newport."

== Personal life ==
His relationship with singer Charlotte Church was well covered by British media. On 20 September 2007 Church gave birth to a daughter Ruby Megan. Henson was excused from a 13 December 2008 Heineken Cup match against Benetton Treviso because Church was due to deliver her second child prematurely, but this did not happen. On 11 January 2009, Church gave birth to the couple's second child, a son. On 31 May 2010 the couple announced that their relationship had ended two months after they had announced their engagement.

In 2011, Henson chose Carianne Barrow to be his girlfriend on reality television series The Bachelor. Their relationship ended in March 2012.

On 28 September 2019, Henson married his long-term partner Katie Wilson Mould at St Michael's and All Angels Church, Guiting Power, on the outskirts of Cheltenham, in Gloucestershire. Her father was the businessman and racehorse owner Raymond Mould. They have a son born in December 2020. In May 2019, Henson became the landlord of the Fox and Hounds in St Brides Major in the Vale of Glamorgan and following refurbishment and a restaurant upgrade, shortened the name to The Fox.

== Television appearances ==
- 71 Degrees North (ITV, 2010)
- Strictly Come Dancing (BBC, 2010)
- The Bachelor (Channel 5, 2011)
- Hunted (Channel 4, 2019)
