= Brad Smith (Canadian football) =

Canadian football player (born 1983)

No. 86
- Positions: Wide receiver, Slotback

Personal information
- Born: October 2, 1983 (age 43); Hudson, Quebec, Canada
- Listed height: 6 ft 1 in (1.85 m)
- Listed weight: 188 lb (85 kg)

Career information
- High school: St. Andrews
- University: Queen's
- CFL draft: 2007: 6th round, 45th overall pick

Career history
- 2007–2009: Toronto Argonauts
- 2010: Edmonton Elks
- Stats at CFL.ca

Bradley Smith (born October 2, 1983) is a Canadian former professional football wide receiver, slotback and television personality who played for the Edmonton Elks of the Canadian Football League. He was drafted by the Toronto Argonauts in the 2007 CFL draft.

Smith is the son of Senator and former Montreal Alouettes' president, Larry Smith, and the brother-in-law of former Alouettes' kicker Damon Duval, who married his sister, Ashley Smith.

Smith was released at the end of the 2009 Toronto Argonauts training camp. He was re-signed to the practice roster on June 27, 2009. He was released on July 14, 2009. Smith was re-signed to the active roster on July 21, 2009, but placed back on their practice roster on July 29, 2009.

On February 10, 2010, Smith was traded from the Argonauts to the Elks along with receiver Andre Talbot in exchange for defensive tackle Eric Taylor.

On May 1, 2012, Smith was announced as the Bachelor for the opening season of Citytv's The Bachelor Canada on that morning's episode of Breakfast Television. He and Bianka Kamber become engaged by the end of The Bachelor Canada's first season. On March 19, 2014, the couple called it quits after being engaged for two years.

After the Bachelor, and until May 29, 2015, Smith became an entertainment reporter with Rogers Media, seen on Rogers Cable TV channel 1, co-hosting Your World This Week (the Rogers promotional channel), and seen on City Toronto as an entertainment reporter, mostly appearing on Breakfast Television. On that date, Smith announced that he was leaving Rogers Media for an opportunity that he just couldn't pass up. On June 8, 2015, Smith tweeted that he would be able to announce his new gig "next week".

On June 23, 2015, Shaw Media announced that Smith would host the new season of Food Network Canada's high-stakes culinary competition series, Chopped Canada. In 2026 he was announced as joining TMS2, Global's new afternoon edition of The Morning Show, as of September 8.
