= Tyler Harcott =

Canadian actor

- Born: Edmonton, Alberta, Canada
- Spouse: Genevieve Gorder (m. 2006; div. 2013) he has gotten married
- Children: 2

Tyler Wayne Harcott is a Canadian actor and television host. He has hosted TLC's Junkyard Wars as well as Miss America: Countdown to the Crown. He has appeared in minor television roles including Honey, I Shrunk the Kids: The TV Show. In 2012, he hosted the first season of The Bachelor Canada.

== Personal life ==
Harcott was born in Edmonton, Alberta, but raised in Calgary, Alberta. He was married to interior designer and television host Genevieve Gorder from 2006 until 2013, with whom he has a daughter.
