= Bachelor (disambiguation) =

A bachelor is an unmarried man, from the old French word "bachelor". (The) Bachelor may also refer to:

== Places ==
=== Canada ===
- Bachelor River, a tributary of Lake Waswanipi in Québec
  - Little Bachelor River, a tributary of the Bachelor River

=== United States ===
- Bachelor Creek (disambiguation)
- Bachelor Mountain (disambiguation)
- Bachelor, Missouri, an unincorporated community
- Bachelor Lake (Brown County, Minnesota), a lake in Minnesota
- Bachelor Peak, a mountain in Texas
- Mount Bachelor, a mountain in Oregon, U.S.
- Bachelor Apartment House in Washington, D.C.
- Bachelor Island

== Film and TV ==
=== Film ===
- The Bachelor, a 1909 Broadway play by Clyde Fitch, later filmed as A Virtuous Vamp (1919)
- The Bachelor (1955 film) (Italian: Lo scapolo), an Italian film starring Alberto Sordi
- The Bachelor (1990 film) (Italian: Mio caro dottor Gräsler), an Italian/Hungarian film starring Keith Carradine
- The Bachelor (1999 film), an American film starring Chris O'Donnell and Renée Zellweger
- Bachelor (2004 film), a Bangladeshi film released in 2004
- Bachelor (2021 film), Tamil film starring G. V. Prakash Kumar

=== TV ===
- The Bachelor (franchise), a reality television dating show franchise with numerous versions:
  - The Bachelor (American TV series)
  - The Bachelor (Australian TV series)
  - The Bachelor (Brazilian TV series)
  - The Bachelor (British TV series)
  - The Bachelor Canada
  - The Bachelor (Greek TV series)
  - The Bachelor (Israeli TV series)
  - The Bachelor New Zealand
  - Burlacul, Romania
  - The Bachelor Vietnam
- The Bachelor (Chinese TV series), a drama series unrelated to The Bachelor franchise

== Music ==
- Bachelor, an American indie rock band that is the joint project of Jay Som and El Kempner of Palehound
- The Bachelor (album), a 2009 album and title song by Patrick Wolf
- Ginuwine...the Bachelor, an album by Ginuwine
- "Bachelor" (song), by Turbo and Gunna
- "Bachelor", a song by D'banj
- "The Bachelor", a classical song by Peter Warlock

== See also ==
- The Bachelors (disambiguation)
- Bachelor in Paradise (disambiguation)
- Batchelor (disambiguation)
- Studio apartment or bachelor-style apartment
- Bachelorette (disambiguation)
- Bachelor's degree (Baccalaureate)
- Baccalaureate (disambiguation)
- Confirmed bachelor, or "he never married", a euphemism for a homosexual man
