= Batchelor (surname) =

Surname

Batchelor is a long established surname in England and Scotland, but the name has Anglo-Norman roots, and may also refer to a person in the glassmaking trade.

Notable people with the surname Batchelor include:

- Anna Batchelor, British physician
- C. D. Batchelor (1888–1977), American cartoonist
- Casey Batchelor (born 1984), English glamour model and reality TV star
- Charles Batchelor (1845–1910), American inventor and associate of Thomas Alva Edison
- Claude Batchelor (born 1929), United States Army soldier
- David Batchelor (artist and writer) (born 1955), Scottish artist and writer
- David Batchelor (sound mixer) (1941–2005), English sound mixer in television adverts
- Doug Batchelor, (born 1957), American pastor, evangelist and author
- Edward A. Batchelor (1883–1968), American sportswriter
- Erica Batchelor (born 1933), British figure skater
- Gary Batchelor, Canadian soccer player
- George Batchelor (1920–2000), Australian mathematician and fluid dynamicist
- Horace Batchelor (1898–1977), British businessman
- Jeff Batchelor (born 1988), Canadian snowboarder
- John Batchelor (born 1948), American author and radio host
- John Batchelor (actor) (born 1969), Australian television actor
- John Batchelor (illustrator) (1936–2019), English technical illustrator
- John Batchelor (missionary) (1855–1944), English missionary and first person to study the Ainu in depth
- John Batchelor (politician) (1820–1883), British politician and businessman
- John Batchelor (racing) (1959–2010), British racing team owner and ex-chairman of York City FC
- John Batchelor (rugby union) (born 1970), English rugby player
- John Batchelor (trade unionist) (1842–1929), British trade union leader
- Joy Batchelor (1914–1991), English director, producer, writer, art director and animator
- Karen Batchelor, American lawyer and genealogist
- Keith Batchelor (1930–2009), Australian rules footballer
- Lee Batchelor (1865–1911), Australian politician
- Leon Dexter Batchelor (1884–1958), American professor of horticulture
- Lillian Lewis Batchelor (1907–1977), American librarian
- Lynn Batchelor, American politician
- Marc Batchelor (born 1971), South African soccer player
- Peter Batchelor (born 1950), Australian politician
- Ray Batchelor (1924–2006), British athletics and football coach who worked in Kenya
- Stephen Batchelor (agnostic) (born 1953), British writer and teacher
- Stephen Batchelor (field hockey) (born 1961), British field hockey player
- Todd A. Batchelor (born 1970), American businessman and politician

== See also ==
- Batchelor (disambiguation)
- Batchelor family (Benjamin Batchelor and descendants), owners of the 18th-century Dennis Glassworks
- Daniel Bacheler, also spelt Bachiler, Batchiler, or Batchelar, (1572–1619), English lutenist and composer
