= Greatest Hits (Dolly Parton album) =

Compilation album by Dolly Parton
- Released: September 13, 1982
- Recorded: 1976–1982
- Genres: Country; pop
- Length: 38:48
- Label: RCA Victor
- Producers: Dolly Parton; Gregg Perry

Dolly Parton chronology
The Best Little Whorehouse in Texas (1982)	Greatest Hits (1982)	The Winning Hand (1982)

Professional ratings
Review scores
Source	Rating
The Encyclopedia of Popular Music	2/5 stars

Greatest Hits is a compilation album by the American singer and songwriter Dolly Parton, released in September 1982. It focused mostly on her late 1970s pop hits. The original track list was revised a year later to include Parton's 1983 duet hit with Kenny Rogers, "Islands in the Stream". The album has since been reissued with an abbreviated track listing. The 1983 version was re-released on iTunes April 10, 2020.

This album was certified Platinum by the Recording Industry Association of America.

== Track listing ==
=== Standard edition ===
All tracks are written by Dolly Parton, except where noted.

No.	Title	Writer(s)	Length
1.	"9 to 5"		2:44
2.	"But You Know I Love You"	Mike Settle	3:17
3.	"Heartbreak Express"		3:13
4.	"Old Flames Can't Hold a Candle to You"	Hugh Moffatt, Pebe Sebert, Rosemary Sebert	3:22
5.	"Applejack"		3:20
6.	"Me and Little Andy"		2:40
7.	"Here You Come Again"	Barry Mann, Cynthia Weil	2:57
8.	"Hard Candy Christmas"	Carol Hill	3:50
9.	"Two Doors Down"		3:02
10.	"It's All Wrong, But It's All Right"		3:19
11.	"Do I Ever Cross Your Mind"		4:02
12.	"I Will Always Love You"		3:02
Total length:			38:48

=== 1989 reissue ===
All tracks are written by Dolly Parton, except where noted.

No.	Title	Writer(s)	Length
1.	"9 to 5"		2:44
2.	"But You Know I Love You"	Mike Settle	3:17
3.	"Here You Come Again"	Barry Mann, Cynthia Weil	2:57
4.	"Two Doors Down"		3:02
5.	"It's All Wrong, But It's All Right"		3:19
6.	"Islands in the Stream" (with Kenny Rogers)	Barry Gibb, Maurice Gibb, Robin Gibb	4:08
7.	"Old Flames Can't Hold a Candle to You"	Hugh Moffatt, Pebe Sebert, Rosemary Sebert	3:22
8.	"Do I Ever Cross Your Mind"		4:02
9.	"I Will Always Love You"		3:02
Total length:			29:53

Notes

- This album includes the 1982 Best Little Whorehouse in Texas version of "I Will Always Love You".
- The 1983 reissue used the standard tracklist but substituted "Islands in the Stream" for "Hard Candy Christmas"

== Charts ==
=== Weekly charts ===
Chart (1982–1985)	Peak position
Canadian Albums (RPM)	58
Dutch Albums (Album Top 100)	17
UK Albums (Official Charts)	74
US Billboard 200	77
US Top Country Albums (Billboard)	7
US Cashbox Country Albums	5
US Cash Box Top Albums	74

Chart (2026)	Peak position
Croatian International Albums (HDU)	26

=== Year-end charts ===
Chart (1983)	Position
Dutch Albums (Album Top 100)	96

== Certifications ==
Region	Certification	Certified units/sales
Australia (ARIA)	Platinum	70,000^{‡}
Canada (Music Canada)	Gold	50,000^{^}
United Kingdom (BPI)	Gold	100,000^{‡}
United States (RIAA)	Platinum	1,000,000^{^}
^{^} Shipments figures based on certification alone.^{‡} Sales+streaming figures based on certification alone.
