= Single Ladies =

Single Ladies may refer to:

- "Single Ladies (Put a Ring on It)", a song by Beyoncé
- Single Ladies (TV series), an American television series on the VH1 network
- "Single Ladies", a song by Remady and Manu-L, featuring J-Son

== See also ==
- "Single Women", a song by Dolly Parton
- Ladies singles (disambiguation)
- A Single Woman (disambiguation)
- Bachelorette (disambiguation)
