= Batchelor =

Batchelor may refer to:

- Batchelor, Northern Territory, Australia, a town
- Batchelor, Louisiana, United States, an unincorporated community
- Batchelor (surname), people with the surname

== See also ==
- Batchelors, a food brand
- Bachelor, an unmarried man
- Louis Bachelier (1870–1946), French mathematician
- Bachelor (disambiguation)
- The Bachelors (disambiguation)
