= A Single Woman =

A Single Woman may refer to:

- A Single Woman (album), by Nina Simone, and its title song
- A Single Woman (play), by Jeanmarie Simpson
- A Single Woman (film), 2009, made by Kamala Lopez

== See also ==
- "Single Women", a song by Dolly Parton
- Single Ladies (disambiguation)
- Bachelorette (disambiguation)
