= John Batchelor (disambiguation) =

John Batchelor (born 1948) is an American author and radio show host.

John Batchelor may also refer to:

- John Batchelor (actor) (born 1969), Australian television actor
- John Batchelor (illustrator) (1936–2019), English technical illustrator
- John Batchelor (missionary) (1855–1944), English missionary and first person to study the Ainu in depth
- John Batchelor (politician) (1820–1883), British politician and businessman
- John Batchelor (racing) (1959–2010), British racing team owner and ex-chairman of York City FC
- John Batchelor (rugby union) (born 1970), English rugby player
- John Batchelor (trade unionist) (1842–1929), British trade union leader
