= Bachelors Walk, Dublin =

Street in Dublin, Ireland

Bachelors Walk
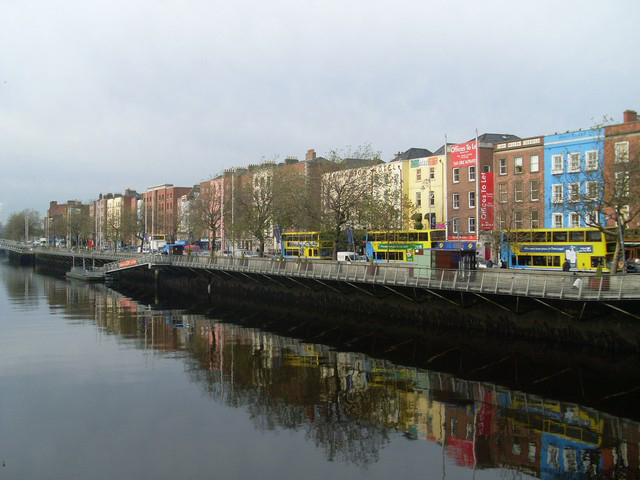
- Bachelor's Walk, and the Liffey Boardwalk, looking northwest

- Location within Central Dublin
- Native name: Siúlán Bhaitsiléir (Irish)
- Namesake: A property owner named Batchelor
- Length: 270 m (890 ft)
- Width: 17 metres (56 ft)
- Postal code: D01
- Nearest metro station: 53°20′50″N 6°15′37″W
- east end: O'Connell Bridge
- west end: Ha'penny Bridge

Other
- Known for: Bachelors Walk (TV series), Bachelor's Walk massacre

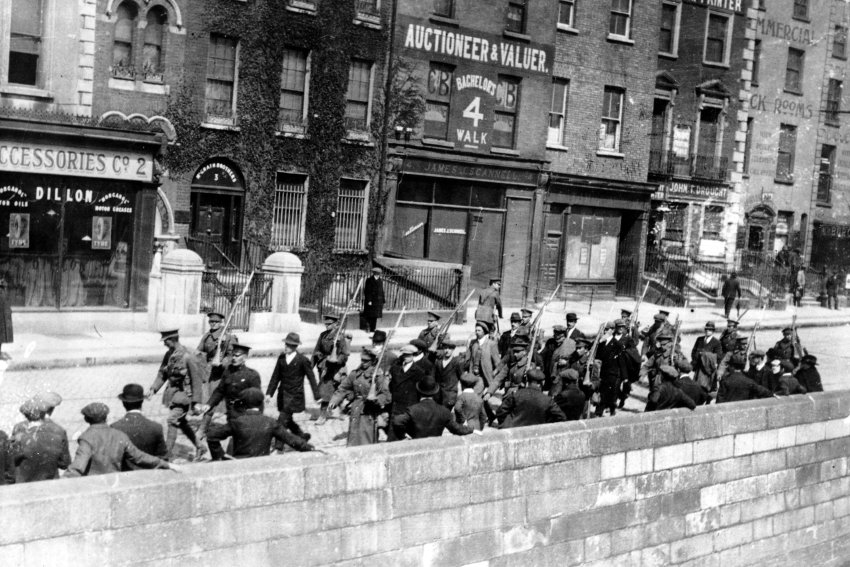
Prisoners are marched, under guard, along Bachelors Walk following the Easter Rising of 1916

Bachelors Walk (Irish: Siúlán Bhaitsiléir) is a street and quay on the north bank of the Liffey, Dublin, Ireland. It runs between Liffey Street Lower (to the west) and O'Connell Street Lower and O'Connell Bridge (to the east). It was the setting for an eponymous TV series in the early 2000s.

== History ==
Bachelor's Walk was named after the developer who built up the street, extending from Ormond Quay from the 1670s. It was recorded as Batchelours Walke in 1728, The Batchelors Walk in 1723 and 1728, and Bachelors Quay in 1766. Before the street that became O'Connell Street was extended to meet the Liffey, Bachelors Walk extended to Eden Quay ending at Union Lane, now Marlborough Street.

A Turkish Bath was opened on Bachelor's Walk in the 1770s by Achmet Borumborad, an Irish man who masqueraded as a Turk for a period in the late eighteenth century.

The Irish Church Missions - part of the Church of Ireland - are located on Bachelors Walk.

In July 1914, a hostile crowd accosted a column of troops of the King's Own Scottish Borderers on Bachelors Walk. The troops responded to stone throwing with bayonets and rifle fire, resulting in the deaths of several civilians and injuries to dozens more. The event later became known as the Bachelor's Walk massacre.

== See also ==
- Dublin quays
