= Bachelorette (disambiguation) =

A bachelorette is an unmarried woman.

Bachelorette may also refer to:

== Film, television, and related ==
- The Bachelorette, a reality television dating show part of The Bachelor franchise with numerous versions:
  - The Bachelorette (American TV series), the original American version that debuted in 2003
  - The Bachelorette (Australian TV series), the Australian version that debuted in 2015
  - The Bachelorette Canada, the Canadian version that debuted in 2016
  - The Bachelorette India, the 2013 Indian version
- Bachelorette (film), a 2012 American film
- Bachelorette, a play by Leslye Headland

== Music ==
- "Bachelorette" (song), a 1997 single by Icelandic singer Björk
- "Bachelorette", a 1998 B-side song by American recording artist Tori Amos
- Bachelorette (singer), a musical project by New Zealand singer Annabel Alpers

== Other uses ==
- Studio apartment, called a "bachelorette" in Canada
- Bachelor's degree (Baccalaureate) for a female

== See also ==
- Bachelorette party
- Single Ladies (disambiguation)
- A Single Woman (disambiguation)
- Bachelor (disambiguation)
- Baccalaureate (disambiguation)
