= William Napier (British Army officer, born 1818) =

British Army general (1818–1903)

Major-General William Napier
- Born: William Craig Emilius Napier; 18 March 1818
- Died: 23 September 1903 (aged 85)
- Military career
- Allegiance: United Kingdom
- Branch: British Army
- Rank: Major-General
- Commands: Royal Military College, Sandhurst
- Conflicts: Recapture of Port Natal; Scinde Campaign; Crimean War

Major-General William Craig Emilius Napier (18 March 1818 – 23 September 1903) was a British Army officer who became Governor of the Royal Military College, Sandhurst.

== Military career ==
Born the son of Lieutenant-General Sir George Thomas Napier and educated at Cheltenham College, William Napier served with the Buffs (Royal East Kent Regiment), and subsequently with the King's Own Scottish Borderers. He was Director-General of Military Education and fought at the recapture of Port Natal in 1842, in the Scinde Campaign in 1845 and in the Crimean War in 1855.

He went on to be Commandant of the Staff College, Sandhurst in 1861 and Governor of the Royal Military College, Sandhurst from 1875.

He was given the colonelcy of the Buffs (Royal East Kent Regiment) from 1874 to 1882 and of the King's Own Scottish Borderers from 1882 to his death.

== Family ==
He died in 1903. In 1845 he had married his cousin, Emily Cephalonia Napier, daughter of Lieutenant-General Sir Charles James Napier; they had seven daughters and one son.

Military offices
Preceded by Sir Duncan Cameron	Governor of the Royal Military College, Sandhurst; 1875−1882	Succeeded by Sir Richard Taylor
Honorary titles
Preceded by Henry Dive Townshend	Colonel of the 25th (King's Own Borderers) Regiment of Foot; 1882−1903	Succeeded by Somerset M. Wiseman Clarke
Preceded by The Hon. Sir James Lindsay	Colonel of the Buffs (East Kent Regiment); 1874−1882	Succeeded by Sir Julius Augustus Robert Raines
