= Ralph (singer) =

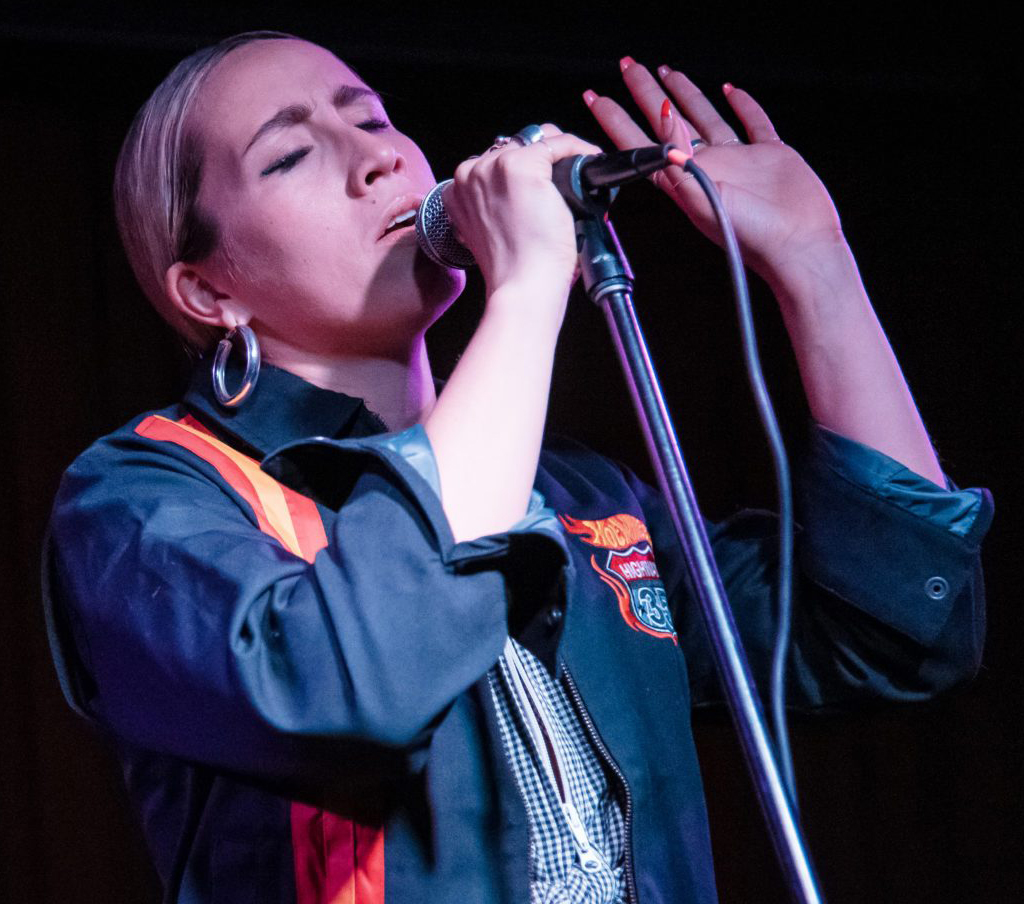
- Ralph performing in March 2017

Background information
- Born: Raffaela Weyman; Toronto, Ontario, Canada
- Origin: Toronto, Ontario
- Genres: Synth-pop; disco; smooth soul
- Occupations: Singer; songwriter
- Instrument: Vocals
- Years active: 2014–present
- Labels: 604, Rich Man, Wednesday, Crocodile Tears, Skeletory
- Website: songsbyralph.com

Raffaela Weyman, known professionally as Ralph (often stylised as RALPH), is a Canadian singer and songwriter from Toronto, Ontario.

== Early life ==
Weyman was born in Toronto, Ontario. She's a trained vocalist from Toronto's collegial Annex neighborhood. As a child, Weyman developed appreciation for the sounds and styles of the past, including Fleetwood Mac, David Bowie, Prince and The Temptations.

== Career ==
=== 2015–2016: Early career ===
Weyman began writing and performing as Ralph a few years ago with a creative partner. According to her, it wasn't a productive relationship as she'd receive instrumental portions from him and have to write songs based on them: "I always felt it was a bit of a backseat project for a little while. I was interested in the project, and doing it with him, but I felt this disconnect because I wouldn't be writing the songs with him." On May 1, 2015, she released her debut single "Trouble" with an accompanying video.

After she signed with 604 Records Ontario, Ralph started to feel more in control of her own music and began to write songs for her debut EP. The song "Cold to the Touch" was released on May 25, 2016, as the lead single from the project. Three months later, she released the second single "Something More" on August 3, which was inspired by Aziz Ansari's Netflix show Master of None. The music video for the song premiered on October 7, becoming her first official video to be released on Vevo. The third single "Busy Man" was released on October 24.

=== 2017–2018: Ralph and A Good Girl ===
On February 14, 2017, Ralph announced the release of the EP's fourth single "Tease". The next day, on February 15, the song came out alongside a proper music video. On the same day, the self-titled EP Ralph became available to pre-order on iTunes. The EP was officially released on March 3 containing all her previous singles, with the exception of "Trouble", plus two new songs, "Lit the Fire" and "Crocodile Tears", the latter being the first song she wrote for the project. A launch party for the EP was held on March 22 at Drake Underground in Toronto. On May 17, the single "Cold to the Touch" received an official music video.

On June 28, Ralph released a cover of Candi Staton's song "Young Hearts Run Free" as a promotional single. The singer has revealed she's been working on a full-length album, which she expects to be "bigger, better and more interesting, more surprising". On October 6, 2017, she released "Screenplay", featuring the Canadian duo The Darcys, as a promotional single to support the tour they held together in November.

"September Fades", previously known as "Evergreen", was released on March 7, 2018, as the lead single from her debut album. The music video for the song was filmed on October 18, 2017, and released on March 7, 2018. It was directed by Gemma Warren and it is mainly inspired by the American TV series Twin Peaks. On April 6, 2018, the singer was featured on the single "Target" by the British duo Hannie.

Ralph released a second single titled "Girl Next Door", which features fellow Canadian rapper Tobi on May 2, 2018. A music video for the single, directed by Ally Pankiw, premiered on July 4, 2018. The third single, "Tables Have Turned", was released on July 18, 2018. Danielle Nemet shot and directed a music video for the song, which was later released on November 15, 2018. On August 22, the singer announced the release date of her debut studio album A Good Girl, which was released on September 28, 2018. Along with the announcement, "Weather" was released as the fourth single from the album. The fifth and final single "Long Distance Lover" was released on October 2, 2018, alongside a music video directed by Ally Pankiw.

=== 2019–2021: Flashbacks & Fantasies ===
On June 19, 2019, Ralph announced a new single titled "Gravity", which was released as the lead single for her second EP, Flashbacks & Fantasies, on July 3. An animated music video for the song premiered on July 4. It was made by artist Amika Cooper and features drawings of Ralph in space. As of January 2020, "Gravity" became the singer's first song to reach the top 20 on Mediabase's Canada Top 40 chart peaking at number 20. To date, it has also peaked at number 23 on Nielsen's Canada CHR/Top 40 chart. On July 19, 2019, Australian singer Hopium released the single "Scorpio", which features Ralph. On August 1, the singer announced "No Muss No Fuss" as the second single, which was released on August 14, 2019, accompanied by a music video directed by Gemma Warren. From August 28 to September 19, Ralph served as an opening act for Carly Rae Jepsen during the Canadian concerts for The Dedicated Tour. A third single, "Last Time," was released on October 2, 2019.

Flashbacks & Fantasies was made available for pre-order on October 28, and then officially released on November 13, 2019. Along with the spawned singles, it features three new songs as well: "Headphone Season," "Sunday Girl," and "Looking for You." This last song was released as the fourth single and received a music video directed by Rosanna Peng on the very same day as the EP release.

On January 28, 2020, Ralph was nominated to the Dance Recording of the Year category for the 2020 Juno Award with her 2019 single "Gravity". On January 30, the singer announced "Superbloom", a new single scheduled to be released on February 10.

In the summer of 2020, Ralph appeared as a musical coach on two episodes of the inaugural season of Canada's Drag Race.

She also started a record label with longtime friend and manager Laurie Lee Boutet called 'Rich Man Records', and has since released her own music under the label, with the goal to eventually develop the label and work with other artists to release their music as well.

=== 2021–Present ===
On April 14, 2021, Ralph released her first single off her upcoming EP 'Gradience', the song was called 'Tommy' and she released with a Marie Antoinette inspired music video (directed by Renee Rodenkirchen and shot by Ralph's younger brother, cinematographer Teo Weyman). Tommy did very well on radio, especially on the West Coast of Canada. She released her second single 'Love Potion' in May, and then released 'Gradience' on July 7th.

In 2022, Ralph sang alongside Donovan Woods on his track 'Leave When You Go' from his album 'Big Hurt Boy'

On April 7, 2023, Ralph released her first single off her new album '222' entitled 'Scary Hot'. It was the first song she had ever released where she publicly mentioned her bisexuality, as the song is about being with a woman. She released her second single 'Pain Relief' on May 19, and finally she released '222' in June. The title refers to angel numbers, as she said the numbers 222 were following her everywhere during the year she was writing her EP, so it felt obvious that they meant something important.

She also wrote and performed on a duet with Priyanka, who had become her friend after meeting on Canada's Drag Race Season 1. The song was called 'Bad Bitches Don't Cry' and they released a music video starring the pair, complete with dancing and pyrotechnics.

== Artistry ==
Ralph describes her musical genre as a mixture between synth-pop, disco and smooth soul. She has mentioned Donna Summer, Cher, Stevie Nicks and Sade as her main influences. The singer "blends funky 1970's bass with 1980's style pop keys, while staying contemporary through vocal melodies and fresh synth sounds". Her songwriting style is described as narrative, usually following themes of "jealousy, lust, deception and strength".

== Personal life ==
Ralph came out as bisexual in 2023.

== Discography ==
=== Studio albums ===
| Title | Details |
|---|---|
| A Good Girl | Released: September 28, 2018; Label: 604, Self-released; Formats: CD, digital download, streaming, vinyl |

=== Extended plays ===
| Title | Details |
|---|---|
| Ralph | Released: March 3, 2017; Label: 604, Wednesday; Formats: CD, digital download, streaming, vinyl |
| Flashbacks & Fantasies | Released: November 13, 2019; Label: Crocodile Tears; Formats: CD, digital download, streaming, vinyl |
| Gradience | Released: July 7, 2021; Label: 604; Formats: digital download, streaming |
| 222 | Released: June 30, 2023; Label: 604; Formats: digital download, streaming |

=== Singles ===
==== As lead artist ====
| Title | Year | Peak chart positions | | Album |
| Title | Year | CAN CHR | CAN Hot AC | Album |
|---|---|---|---|---|
| "Trouble" | 2015 | — | — | Non-album single |
| "Cold to the Touch" | 2016 | — | 44 | Ralph |
| "Something More" | 2016 | — | — | Ralph |
| "Busy Man" | 2016 | — | — | Ralph |
| "Tease" | 2017 | — | — | Ralph |
| "September Fades" | 2018 | — | — | A Good Girl |
| "Girl Next Door" (featuring TOBi) | 2018 | — | — | A Good Girl |
| "Tables Have Turned" | 2018 | — | — | A Good Girl |
| "Weather" | 2018 | — | — | A Good Girl |
| "Long Distance Lover" | 2018 | — | — | A Good Girl |
| "Gravity" | 2019 | 23 | 23 | Flashbacks & Fantasies |
| "No Muss No Fuss" | 2019 | — | — | Flashbacks & Fantasies |
| "Last Time" | 2019 | — | — | Flashbacks & Fantasies |
| "Looking for You" | 2019 | — | — | Flashbacks & Fantasies |
| "Superbloom" | 2020 | — | — | Non-album singles |
| "Crush" | 2020 | — | — | Non-album singles |
| "Hard Candy Christmas" | 2020 | — | — | Non-album singles |
| "Tommy" | 2021 | 36 | — | Gradience |
| "Love Potion" | 2021 | — | — | Gradience |
| "A Christmas to Remember" (with Ryland James) | 2021 | — | — | Non-album singles |
| "Gasoline" | 2022 | — | — | Non-album singles |
| "Scary Hot" | 2023 | — | — | 222 |
| "Pain Relief" | 2023 | — | — | 222 |
| "Stacy's Mom" | 2024 | — | — | Non-album singles |
| "Tom Hanks" | 2025 | — | — | Non-album singles |
| "Dangerous Nostalgia" | 2026 | — | — | Non-album singles |
| "Girls Together" | 2026 | — | — | Non-album singles |
| "Memoria" | 2026 | — | — | Non-album singles |
| "Physical Fanpage" | 2026 | — | — | Non-album singles |
| "Love Nouveau" (with Rêve) | 2026 | — | — | Non-album singles |

==== As featured artist ====
| Title | Year | Album |
|---|---|---|
| "Target" (Hannie featuring Ralph) | 2018 | Non-album singles |
| "Scorpio" (Hopium featuring Ralph) | 2019 | Non-album singles |
| "A Christmas to Remember" (Ryland James featuring Ralph) | 2021 | Non-album singles |

==== Promotional singles ====
| Title | Year | Album |
|---|---|---|
| "Young Hearts Run Free" | 2017 | Non-album singles |
| "Screenplay" (with The Darcys) | 2017 | Non-album singles |

== Music videos ==
Director credits adapted from IMVDb.

| Year | Title | Other artist(s) | Director(s) |
|---|---|---|---|
| 2015 | "Trouble" | None | Kit Knows |
| 2016 | "Something More" | None | Matt Bianchi and Thea Hollatz |
| 2017 | "Tease" | None | Gemma Warren |
| 2017 | "Cold to the Touch" | None | Gemma Warren |
| 2018 | "September Fades" | None | Gemma Warren |
| 2018 | "Girl Next Door" | TOBi | Ally Pankiw |
| 2018 | "Long Distance Lover" | None | Ally Pankiw |
| 2018 | "Tables Have Turned" | None | Danielle Nemet |
| 2019 | "Gravity" | None | Amika Cooper |
| 2019 | "No Muss No Fuss" | None | Gemma Warren |
| 2019 | "Looking for You" | None | Rosanna Peng |
