= Ladies singles =

Ladies singles or Women's singles may refer to:

- Individual female players competing one-on-one in some sports including:
  - tennis
  - badminton
  - pickleball
  - squash
  - table tennis
  - professional wrestling
  - match play in golf
- Single skating for ladies

== See also ==
- Singles (disambiguation)
- Single (disambiguation)
- Lady (disambiguation)
- Single Ladies (disambiguation)
