= King's Own Scottish Borderers =

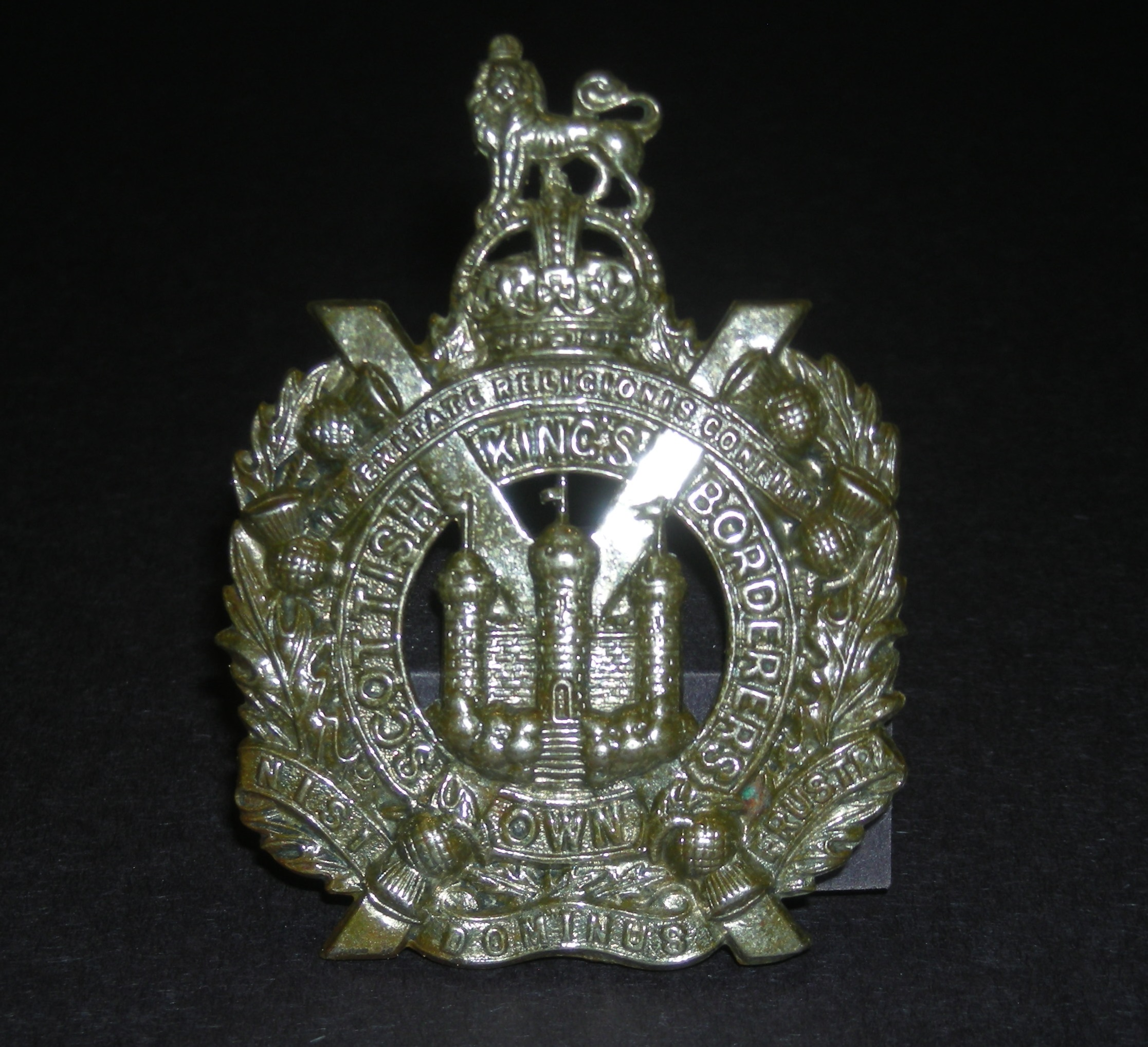
- Cap badge
- Active: 1689 – 1 August 2006
- Allegiance: Kingdom of Scotland (1689–1707); Kingdom of Great Britain (1707–1800); United Kingdom (1801–2006)
- Branch: British Army
- Type: Line Infantry
- Size: One battalion
- Part of: Scottish Division
- Garrison/HQ: Berwick Barracks, Berwick-upon-Tweed
- Mottos: In Veritate Religionis Confido (I put my trust in the truth of religion); Nisi Dominus Frustra (Without the Lord, everything is in vain)
- Anniversaries: Minden – 1 August

Commanders
- Last Colonel-in-Chief: Princess Alice, Duchess of Gloucester, GCB, CI, GCVO, GBE
- Notable commanders: John Cooper (Operation Banner, 1993–97)

Insignia
- Tartan: Leslie (trews); Royal Stewart (pipers kilts and plaids)

The King's Own Scottish Borderers (KOSB) was a line infantry regiment of the British Army, part of the Scottish Division. On 28 March 2006 the regiment was amalgamated with the Royal Scots, the Royal Highland Fusiliers (Princess Margaret's Own Glasgow and Ayrshire Regiment), the Black Watch (Royal Highland Regiment), the Highlanders (Seaforth, Gordons and Camerons), the Argyll and Sutherland Highlanders (Princess Louise's), 52nd Lowland Regiment, and 51st Highland Regiment to form the Royal Regiment of Scotland. However, after just a few months the battalion merged with the Royal Scots Battalion to form the Royal Scots Borderers.

== History ==
=== Early history ===
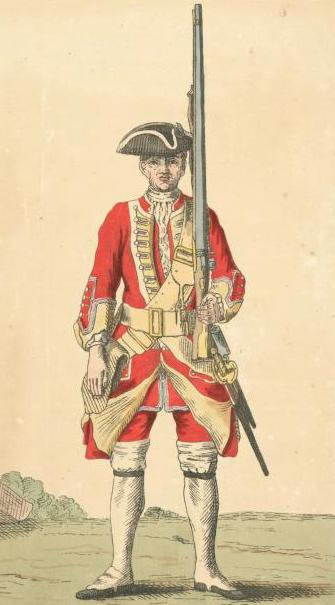
A regimental private in c. 1742

c. 1751 painting of a regimental grenadier (left)

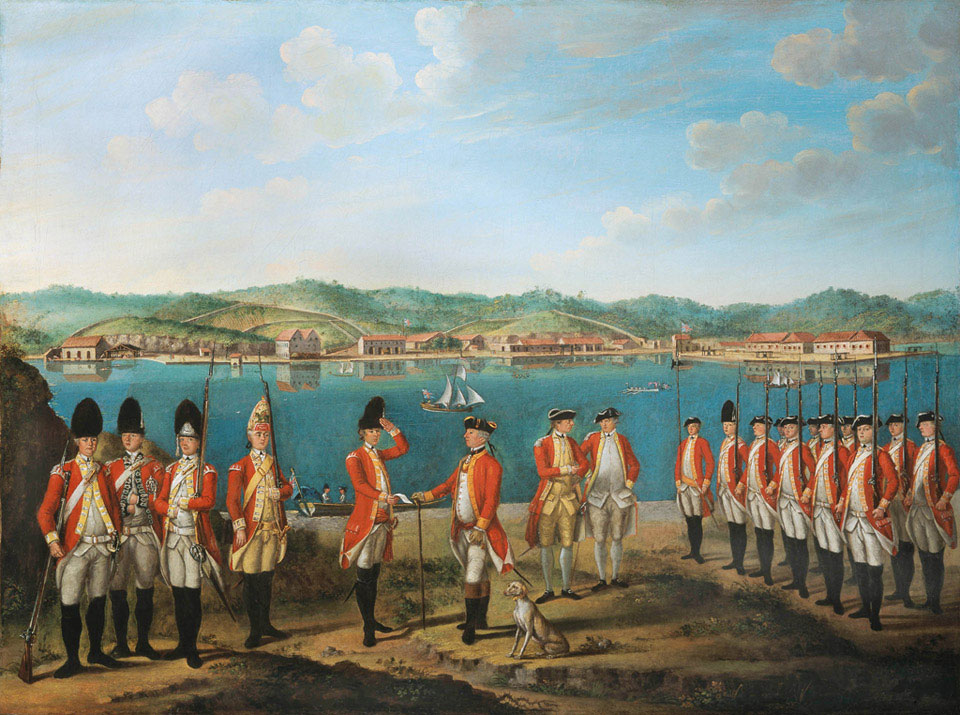
c. 1771 painting of regimental troops (right) in Minorca

The regiment was raised on 18 March 1689 by David Leslie, 3rd Earl of Leven to defend Edinburgh against the Jacobite forces of James VII. It's claimed that 800 men were recruited within the space of two hours. The regiment's first action was at the Battle of Killiecrankie on 27 July 1689. Although this battle was a defeat for the Williamite army, the Jacobite commander, John Graham, 1st Viscount Dundee (Bonnie Dundee), was killed by a volley fired by Leven's Regiment, bringing an end to James II's attempt to save his throne in Scotland. The regiment was judged to have performed well and was granted the privilege of recruiting by beat of drum in the City of Edinburgh without prior permission of the provost.

For a period it was known as Sempill's Regiment of Foot, the name under which it fought at the Battle of Fontenoy in 1745 and the Battle of Culloden in 1746. When the British infantry were allocated numerical positions in the 'line' of Infantry the regiment was numbered 25th Regiment of Foot (based on its formation date) in 1751. The regiment fought at the Battle of Minden on 1 August 1759 with five other regiments; this battle honour was celebrated by the regiment each year on 1 August. The 25th was the county regiment of Sussex in 1782 when it became known as the 25th (Sussex) Regiment of Foot.

The regiment was awarded the right to bear the emblem of the Sphinx for their role in the Battle of Alexandria in 1801. Its recruiting area was moved to the Scottish Borders region in 1805 from when the regiment became known as the 25th (the King's Own Borderers) Regiment of Foot.

=== Victorian era ===
The regiment was not fundamentally affected by the Cardwell Reforms of the 1870s, which gave it a depot at Fulford Barracks in York from 1873, or by the Childers reforms of 1881 – as it already possessed two battalions, there was no need for it to amalgamate with another regiment. The regiment moved to Berwick Barracks in July 1881. Under the reforms the regiment became The King's Own Borderers on 1 July 1881. A 3rd, Militia, Battalion was formed as the Scottish Borderers Militia, with headquarters at Dumfries. The regiment became The King's Own Scottish Borderers in 1887.

During the Second Anglo-Afghan War in 1878 to 1880, the regiment formed part of the 2nd division which was renamed the Khyber Line Force while guarding the lines of communication between Kabul and Peshawar.

The Second Boer War started in South Africa in October 1899, and the British government soon realised they needed larger forces to win the war. The 1st Battalion KOSB embarked for South Africa in early January 1900, and stayed there throughout the war, which ended in June 1902. 300 officers and men of the battalion returned home on the SS Lake Manitoba in February 1903, and was subsequently stationed in Belfast. The 3rd (Militia) battalion was embodied in January 1900 for service in the Second Boer War, and 998 officers and men embarked for South Africa on the SS Kildon Castle two months later. Most of the battalion returned home in June 1902.

In 1908, the Volunteers and Militia were reorganised nationally, with the former becoming the Territorial Force and the latter the Special Reserve; the regiment now had one Reserve and two Territorial battalions.

The Bachelor's Walk massacre happened in Dublin, on 26 July 1914, when a column of troops of the King's Own Scottish Borderers were accosted by a crowd on Bachelor's Walk. The troops attacked "hostile but unarmed" protesters with rifle fire and bayonets, resulting in the deaths of four civilians and injuries to in excess of 30 more.

=== First World War ===
The 1st Battalion was serving in Lucknow, India when the war broke out. After returning to England it landed at Cape Helles in Gallipoli as part of the 87th Brigade in the 29th Division in April 1915. After being evacuated from Gallipoli in January 1916 it moved to Alexandria in Egypt and then landed at Marseille in March 1916 for service on the Western Front. It saw action at the Battle of the Somme in autumn 1916, the Battle of Passchendaele in autumn 1917, the Battle of Lys in April 1918 and the Battle of Cambrai in October 1918.

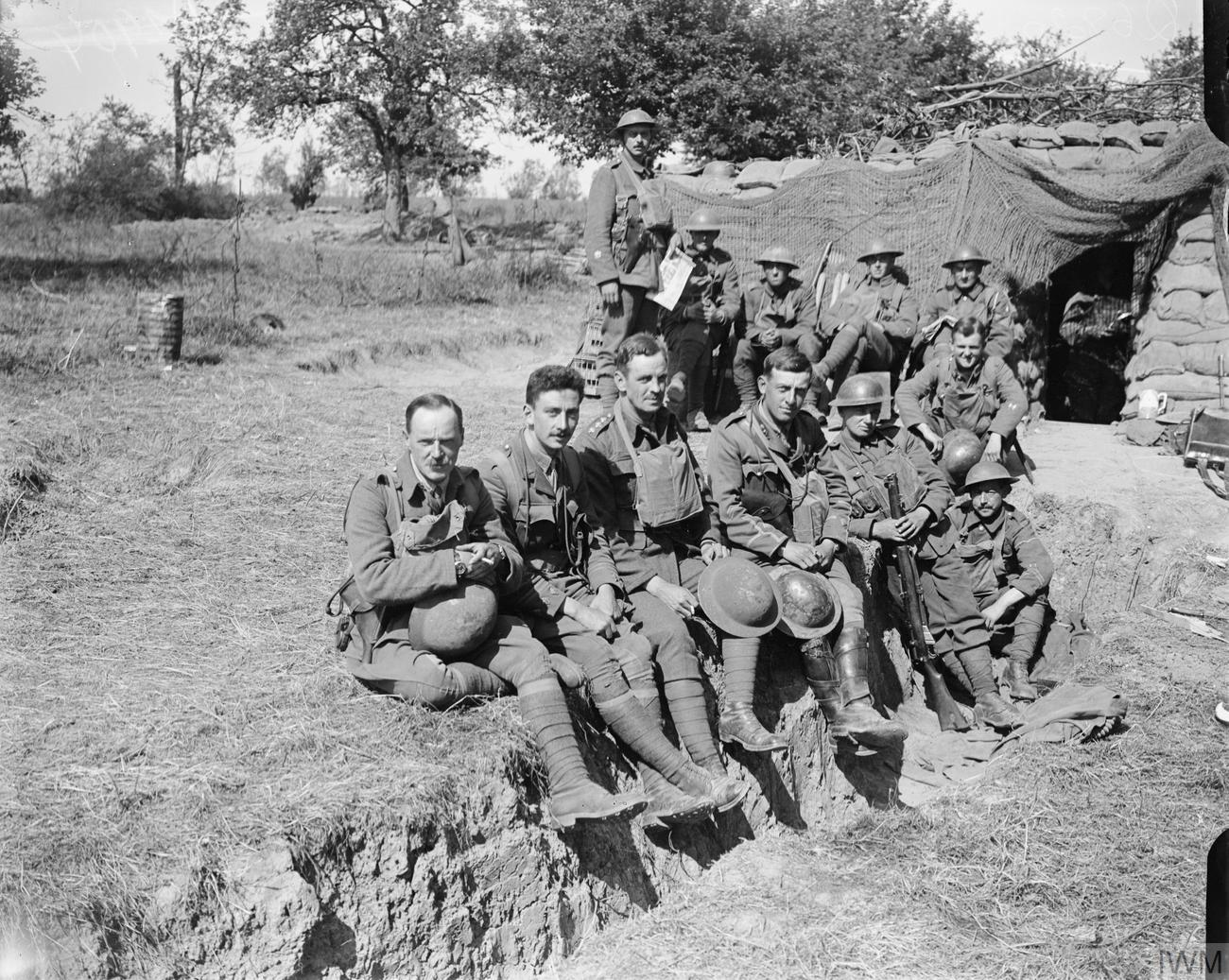
Headquarters and Headquarters staff of the 2nd Battalion, King's Own Scottish Borderers, near Arrewage, 4 July 1918

During the Home Rule Crisis in 1914, the 2nd Battalion was stationed in Dublin as part of 13th Brigade in the 5th Division. A detachment of the battalion was responsible for killing four and wounding 38 unarmed civilians during an altercation with a crowd on the day of the Howth gun-running in July 1914. It then landed at Le Havre in August 1914 for service on the Western Front and saw action at the Battle of Mons in August 1914, the Battle of Le Cateau also in August 1914 and the First Battle of the Aisne in September 1914. It later saw combat at the Second Battle of Ypres in May 1915, the Battle of the Somme in November 1916, the Battle of Vimy Ridge in April 1917, the Battle of Passchendaele in November 1917 and the Battle of Lys in April 1918.

The regiment's two Territorial Force units, the 1/4th (Border) Battalion and the 1/5th (Dumfries & Galloway) Battalion, landed in Gallipoli as part of the 155th Brigade in the 52nd (Lowland) Division in June 1915. After being evacuated from Gallipoli in January 1916 they moved to Egypt and then took part in the Third Battle of Gaza in November 1917 before landing at Marseille in April 1918 for service on the Western Front.

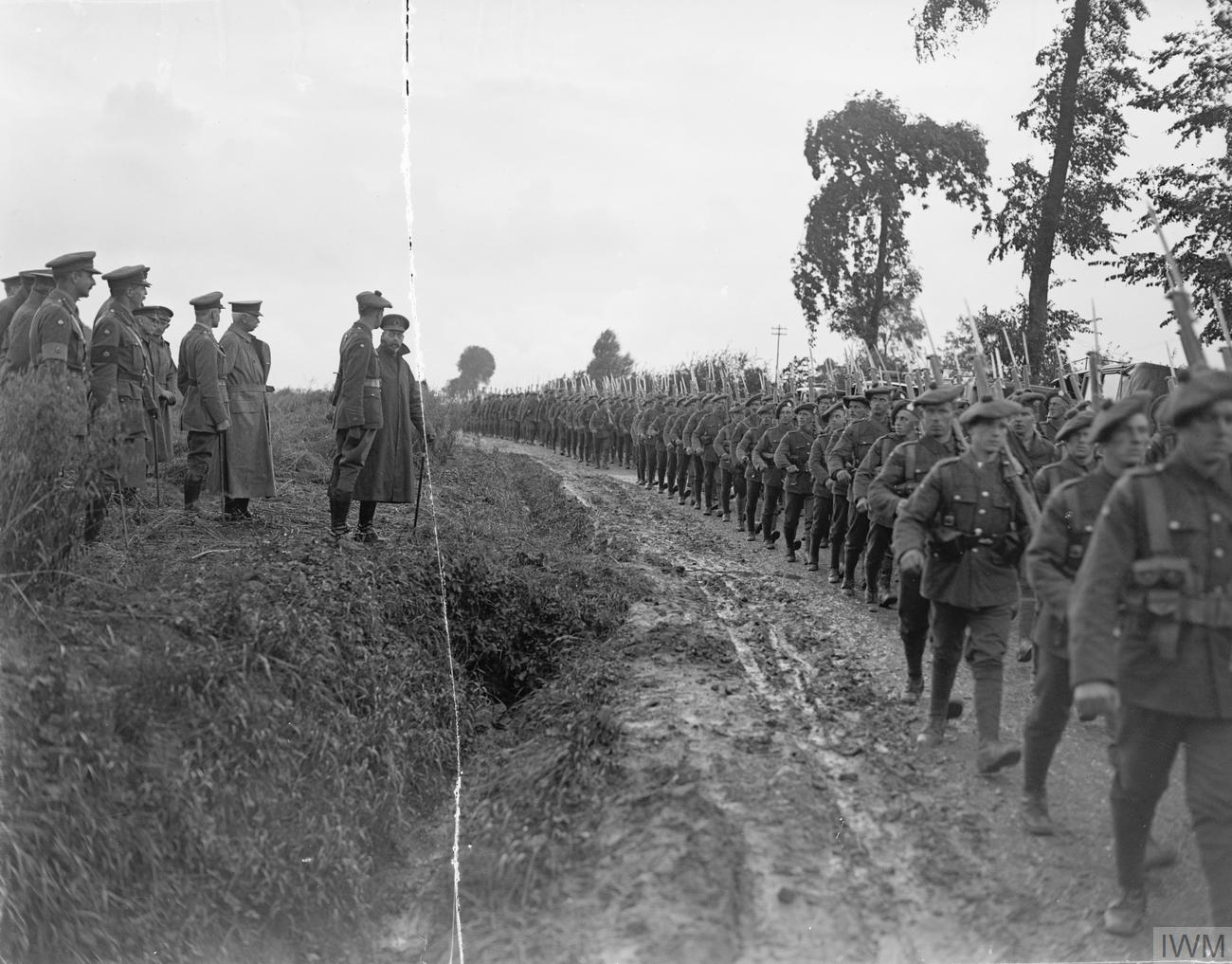
Troops of the 6th Battalion, King's Own Scottish Borderers marching past King George V near La Brearde, 6 August 1918

The 6th (Service) Battalion landed at Boulogne-sur-Mer as part of the 28th Brigade in the 9th (Scottish) Division in May 1915 for service on the Western Front. It saw action at the Battle of Loos in September 1915, the Battle of the Somme in November 1916, the Battle of Arras in May 1917 and the Battle of Passchendaele in November 1917.

The 7th (Service) Battalion and the 8th (Service) Battalion landed at Boulogne-sur-Mer as part of the 46th Brigade in the 15th (Scottish) Division in July 1915 for service on the Western Front. They fought at the Battle of Loos in September 1915, the Battle of the Somme in November 1916, the Battle of Arras in May 1917, the Battle of Pilckem Ridge in August 1917, the Second Battle of the Somme in August 1918 and at the Second Battle of the Marne also in August 1918.

=== Second World War ===
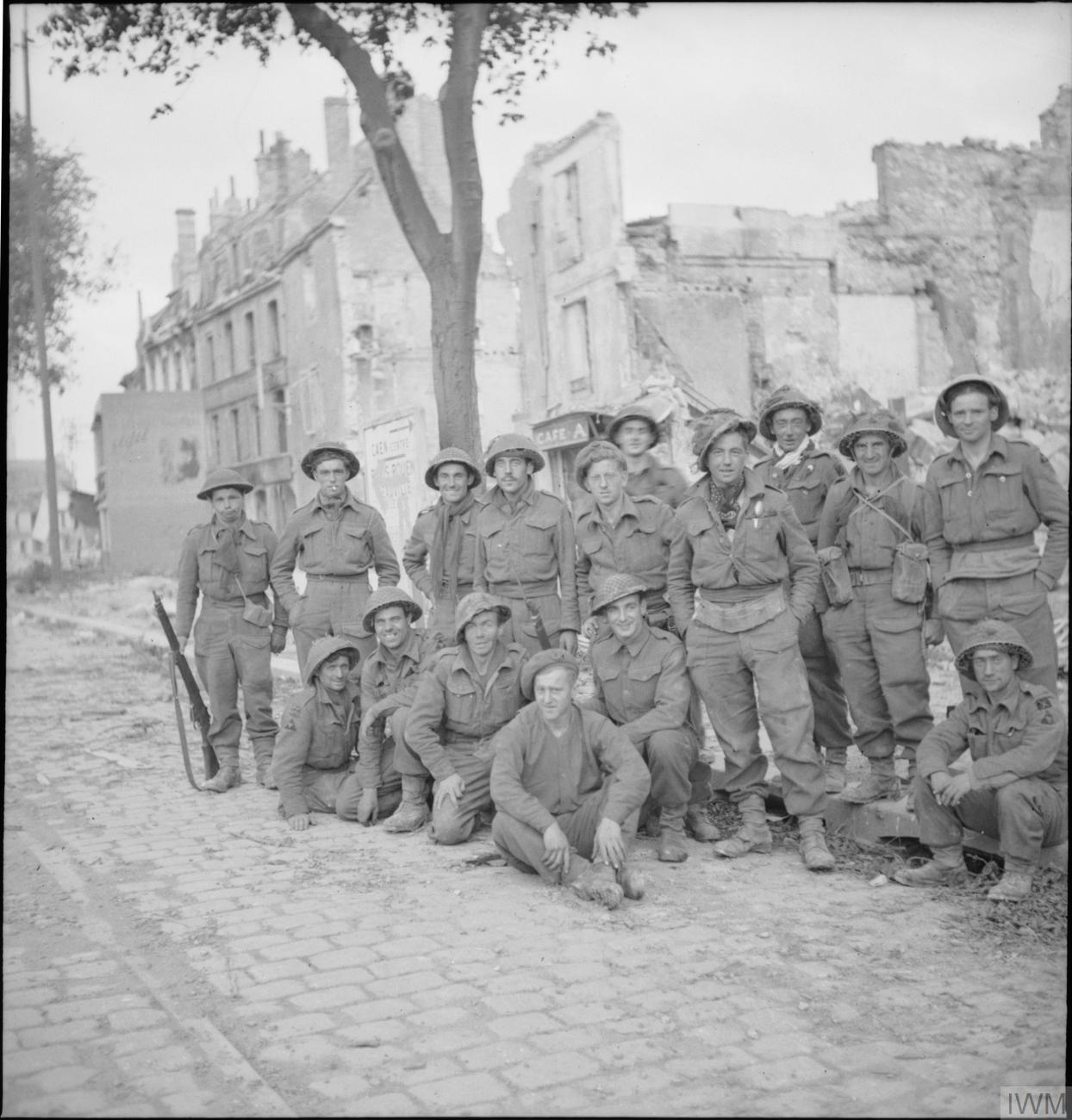
Men of the 1st Battalion, King's Own Scottish Borderers, some of the first troops to enter the French city of Caen after Operation 'Charnwood', 9 July 1944

In the period between the wars, the regiment's regular battalions were sent all over the British Empire to Ireland, Egypt and Hong Kong but were quickly recalled home at the outbreak of the Second World War in September 1939.

The 1st Battalion landed in France as part of the 9th Brigade in the 3rd Infantry Division in September 1939 for service with the British Expeditionary Force (BEF); it took part in the Dunkirk evacuation in June 1940 and the Normandy landings in June 1944 and saw action at the Battle for Caen later that month.

The 2nd Battalion moved to Burma as part of the 89th Brigade in the 7th Indian Infantry Division in September 1943 for service in the Burma Campaign and saw action at the Battle of the Admin Box in February 1944 and the Battle of Imphal in July 1944.

The 4th and 5th Battalions landed at Saint-Malo as part of the 155th Brigade in the 52nd (Lowland) Division in June 1940 for service with the British Expeditionary Force; after evacuation from Cherbourg later in the month they took part in Operation Infatuate in November 1944 and the subsequent capture of Bremen in April 1945.

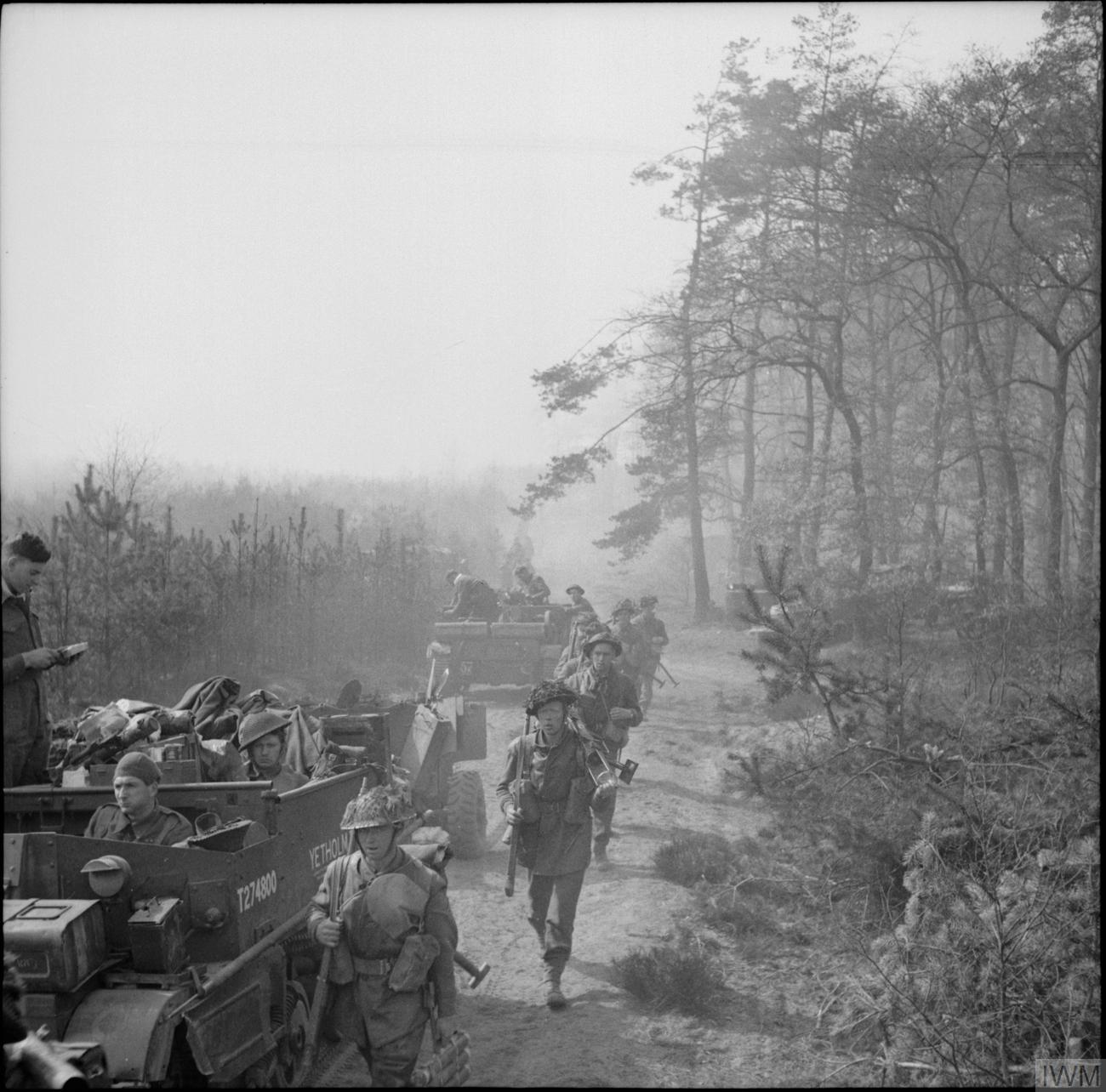
Universal Carriers and infantrymen of the 6th Battalion, King's Own Scottish Borderers move forward after crossing the Rhine, 25 March 1945.

The 6th Battalion took part in the Normandy landings as part of the 44th Brigade in the 15th (Scottish) Division in June 1944 and saw action at the Battle for Caen later that month and then advanced into Germany.

One of its heaviest losses during the war was at the ill-fated Battle of Arnhem in which the 7th Battalion, as part of the 1st Airlanding Brigade of 1st Airborne Division, suffered 90% casualties in September 1944; they defended the perimeter in Oosterbeek against 2nd SS Panzer Corps.

=== Post war ===
After the Second World War, the regiment served internal security duties in the British Mandate of Palestine and was reduced to a single battalion around 1948. The regiment was part of the United Nations forces that saw action at the First Battle of Maryang San in October 1951 during the Korean War. Private Bill Speakman was awarded the Victoria Cross for his actions during the Second Battle of Maryang-san. The regiment was deployed during the Malayan Emergency in the late 1950s.

The regiment was deployed to Aden as the garrison battalion in Aden on internal security duties in February 1962. In April 1964, within three months of its return to the UK and during the 24 hours of its first day as the Spearhead Battalion of the UK Strategic Reserve, it was deployed back to Aden in response to the Radfan Campaign in what had become the Federation of South Arabia. Within a year of its return to the UK in May 1965, the regiment was again deployed overseas in response to Indonesia's aggression in Borneo against newly formed Malaysia. The regiment was at first deployed in Hong Kong, replacing a Gurkha battalion sent to Borneo, then to the Jungle Warfare School at Kota Tinggi in Malaysia in August 1965.

The regiment were then deployed in the mountainous and primary jungle areas of Sarawak in October 1965. Shortly after its return to the UK the regiment was posted to Osnabrück in June 1967. It was subsequently regularly posted to Northern Ireland as part of Operation Banner during the Troubles and suffered casualties during the 1989 Derryard attack which killed two of its men. It took part in the Gulf War in 1991 but was one of the few Scottish regiments not deployed to the Yugoslav Wars: it was being mainly stationed in Northern Ireland instead. The regiment also served in Iraq on Operation Telic in 2003.

=== Restructuring of the infantry ===
Until 2004 the regiment was one of five in the line infantry never to have been amalgamated, the others being The Royal Scots, The Green Howards, The Cheshire Regiment and The Royal Welch Fusiliers. When five Scottish regiments were amalgamated to form the Royal Regiment of Scotland on 28 March 2006, the Royal Scots Battalion and the King's Own Scottish Borderers Battalion initially maintained their identities as separate battalions.

However almost immediately the Ministry of Defence moved to amalgamate the two battalions. This was not a new idea: the origins of the combined entity, Royal Scots Borderers, dates from the 1990 Options for Change review, when it was initially announced that the Royal Scots and King's Own Scottish Borderers would amalgamate. That amalgamation was subsequently rescinded. The Royal Scots Battalion and King's Own Scottish Borderers Battalion duly amalgamated on 1 August 2006 – upon their amalgamation, the new battalion took the name Royal Scots Borderers, 1st Battalion Royal Regiment of Scotland.

== King's Own Scottish Borderers Regimental Museum ==
The King's Own Scottish Borderers Regimental Museum is located in Berwick Barracks, Berwick-upon-Tweed.

== Honours ==
The battle honours are:

- Namur (1695); Minden (1759); Egmont-op-Zee (1799); Egypt (1801); Martinique (1809); Afghanistan (1878–80); Chitral (1895); Tirah (1897–98); Paardeberg, Second Boer War (1899–1902).
- World War I: Mons, Aisne 1914, Ypres 1914, Ypres 1915, Ypres 1917, Ypres 1918, Loos, Somme 1916, Somme 1918, Arras 1917, Soissonnais-Ourcq, Hindenburg Line, Gallipoli, Gaza.
- World War II: Dunkirk, Sword Beach, Odon, Caen, Arnhem, Flushing, Rhine, Bremen, Burma Campaign (Ngakyedauk Pass, Imphal, Irrawaddy).
- Kowang-San (1951–52); Gulf War (1991).

Civic honours are:

- Freedom of the town of Dumfries (1953).

== Colonel-in-Chief ==
The colonel-in-chief was:

- 1937: Princess Alice, Duchess of Gloucester, CI, GCVO, GBE

== Colonels of the Regiment ==
Colonels of the Regiment were:

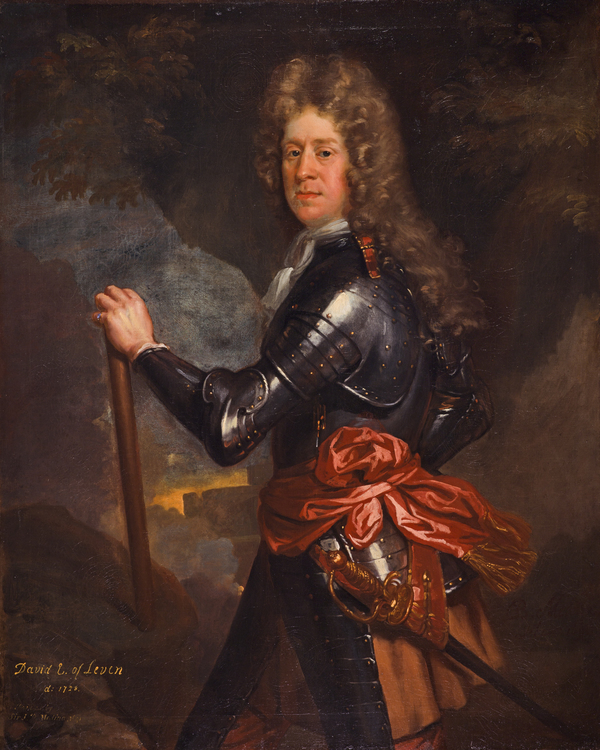
David Leslie, 3rd Earl of Leven

=== Earl of Leven's, or Edinburgh, Regiment of Foot ===
- 1688–1694: Lt-Gen. David Melville, 3rd Earl of Leven
- 1694–1711: Lt-Gen. James Maitland
- 1711–1715: Brig-Gen. William Breton
- 1715–1721: F.M. Richard Boyle, 2nd Viscount Shannon
- 1721–1732: Brig-Gen. John Middleton
- 1732–1745: Gen. John Leslie, 10th Earl of Rothes, KT
- 1745–1746: Brig-Gen. Hugh Sempill, 12th Lord Sempill
- 1746–1747: Lt-Gen. John Lindsay, 20th Earl of Crawford
- 1747–1752: Gen. William Maule, 1st Earl of Panmure

=== 25th (Edinburgh) Regiment of Foot - (1751) ===
- 1752–1761: Lt-Gen. William Home, 8th Earl of Home
- 1761–1762: Lt-Gen. Sir Henry Erskine, Bt

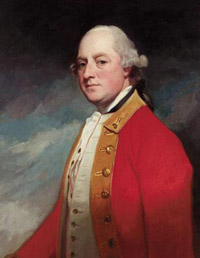
General Lord George Lennox

=== 25th (the Sussex) Regiment of Foot - (1782) ===
- 1762–1805: Gen. Lord George Henry Lennox

=== 25th (the King's Own Borderers) Regiment of Foot - (1805) ===
- 1805–1831: Gen. Hon. Charles FitzRoy
- 1831–1856: Gen. Sir Henry Frederick Campbell, KCB, GCH
- 1856–1862: Lt-Gen. Sir Henry Somerset, KCB, KH
- 1862–1882: Gen. Henry Dive Townshend

=== York Regiment (King's Own Borderers) - (1881) ===
- 1882–1903: Gen. William Craig Emilius Napier

=== King's Own Scottish Borderers - (1887) ===
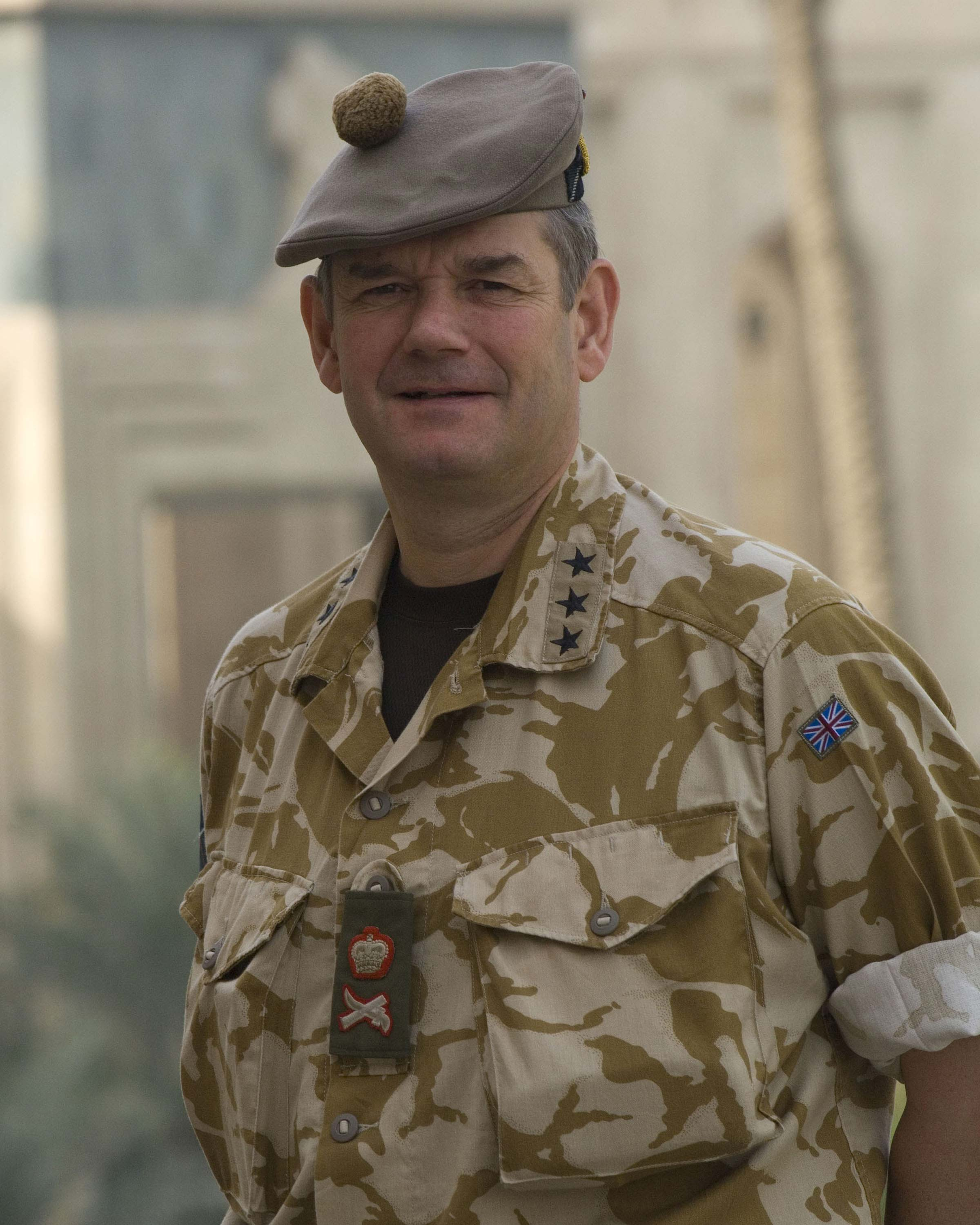
Lt-Gen. John Cooper Last Colonel of the Regiment

- 1903–1905: Lt-Gen. Somerset Molyneux Wiseman-Clarke, CB
- 1905–1910: Gen. Sir Frederick William Edward Forestier-Walker, KCB, GCMG
- 1910–1923: Lt-Gen. Sir Charles Louis Woollcombe, KCB, KCMG
- 1923–1928: F.M. Sir Douglas Haig, 1st Earl Haig, KT, GCB, OM, GCVO, KCIE
- 1928–1938: Brig-Gen. Duncan Alwyn Macfarlane, CB, DSO
- 1938–1944: Maj-Gen. Sir Edward Nicholson Broadbent, KBE, CB, CMG, DSO
- 1944–1954: Maj-Gen. Eric Grant Miles, CB, DSO, MC
- 1954–1961: Maj-Gen. James Scott-Elliot, CB, CBE, DSO
- 1961–1970: Lt-Gen. Sir William Francis Robert Turner, KBE, CB, DSO, DL
- 1970–1980: Brig. Francis Henderson Coutts, CBE
- 1980–1985: Brig. Andrew Dewe Myrtle, CB, CBE
- 1985–1990: Brig. Robert William Riddle, OBE
- 1990–1995: Brig. Colin Grierson Mattingley, CBE
- 1995–2001: Maj-Gen. Timothy Toyne Sewell
- 2001–2006: Maj-Gen. John Cooper, DSO, MBE

== Football ==
The 1st Battalion's football team was a member of the Irish Football League for one season, 1903–04, while the battalion was stationed at the Victoria Barracks, Belfast.

== Gallery ==
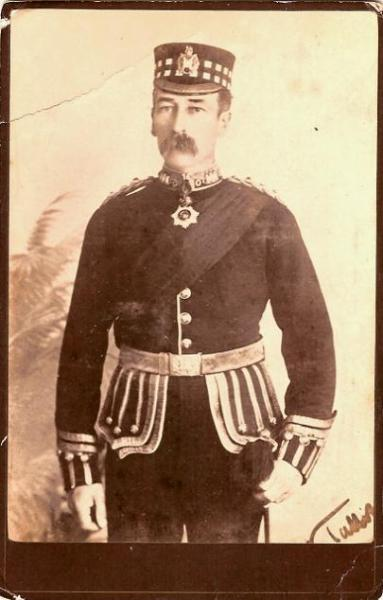
John Talbot Coke, second-in-command of the KOSB in the Sudan campaign, who went on to be a general officer in the Second Boer War

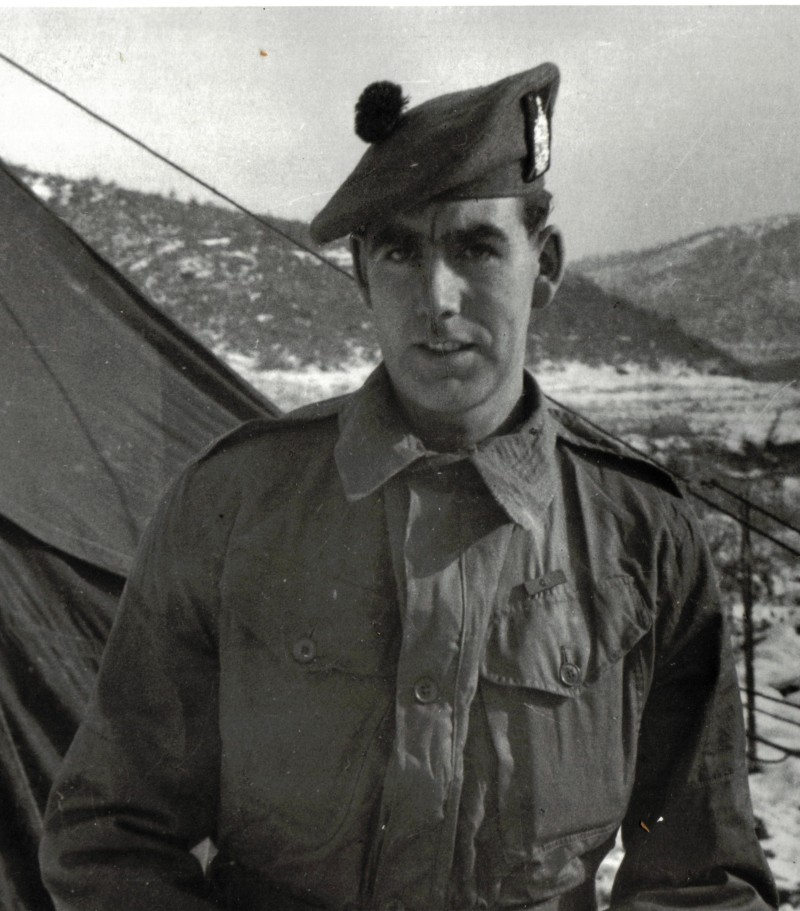
Sergeant Bill Speakman, who was awarded the Victoria Cross in the Korean War.

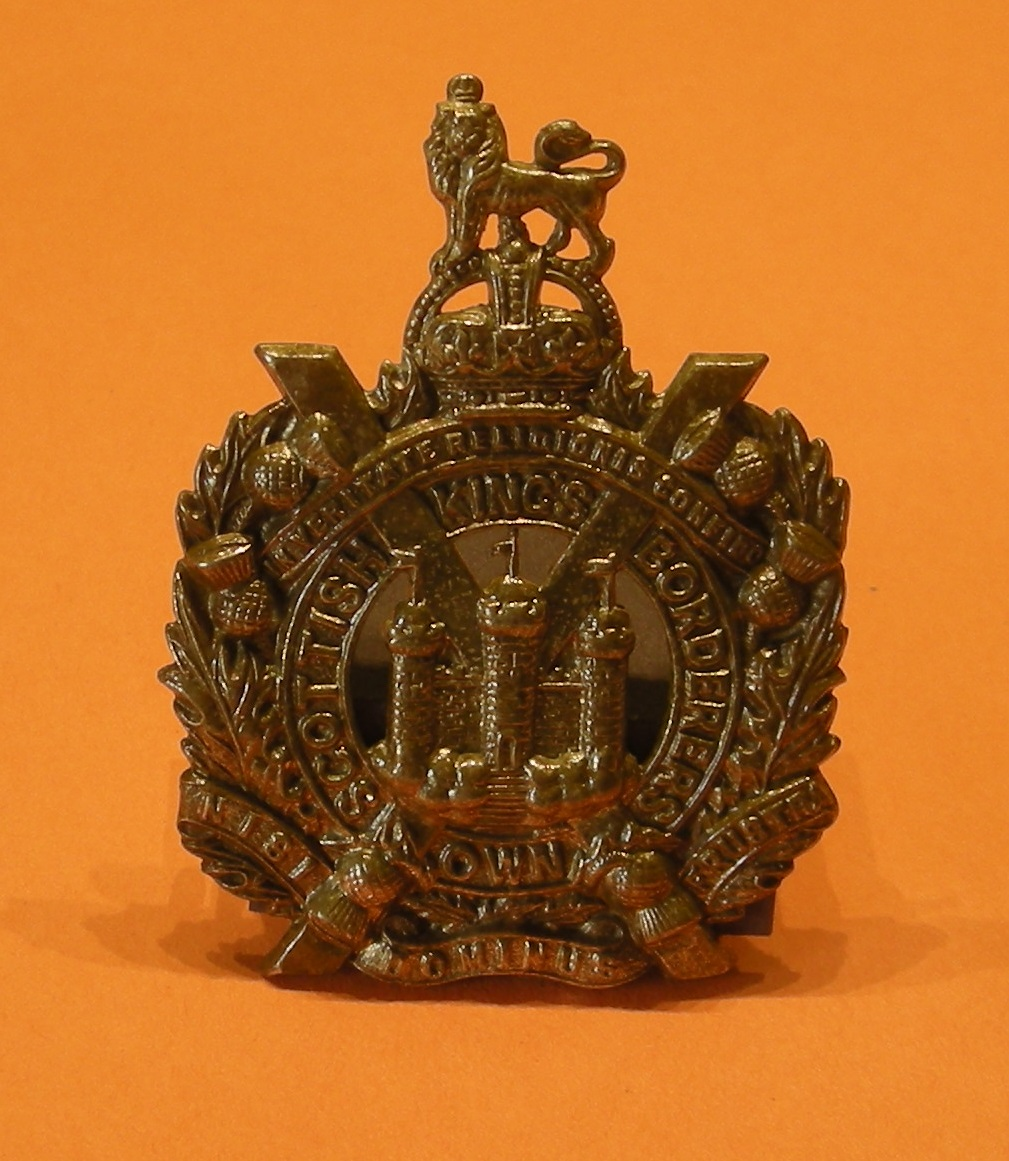
Cap badge, King's Own Scottish Borderers

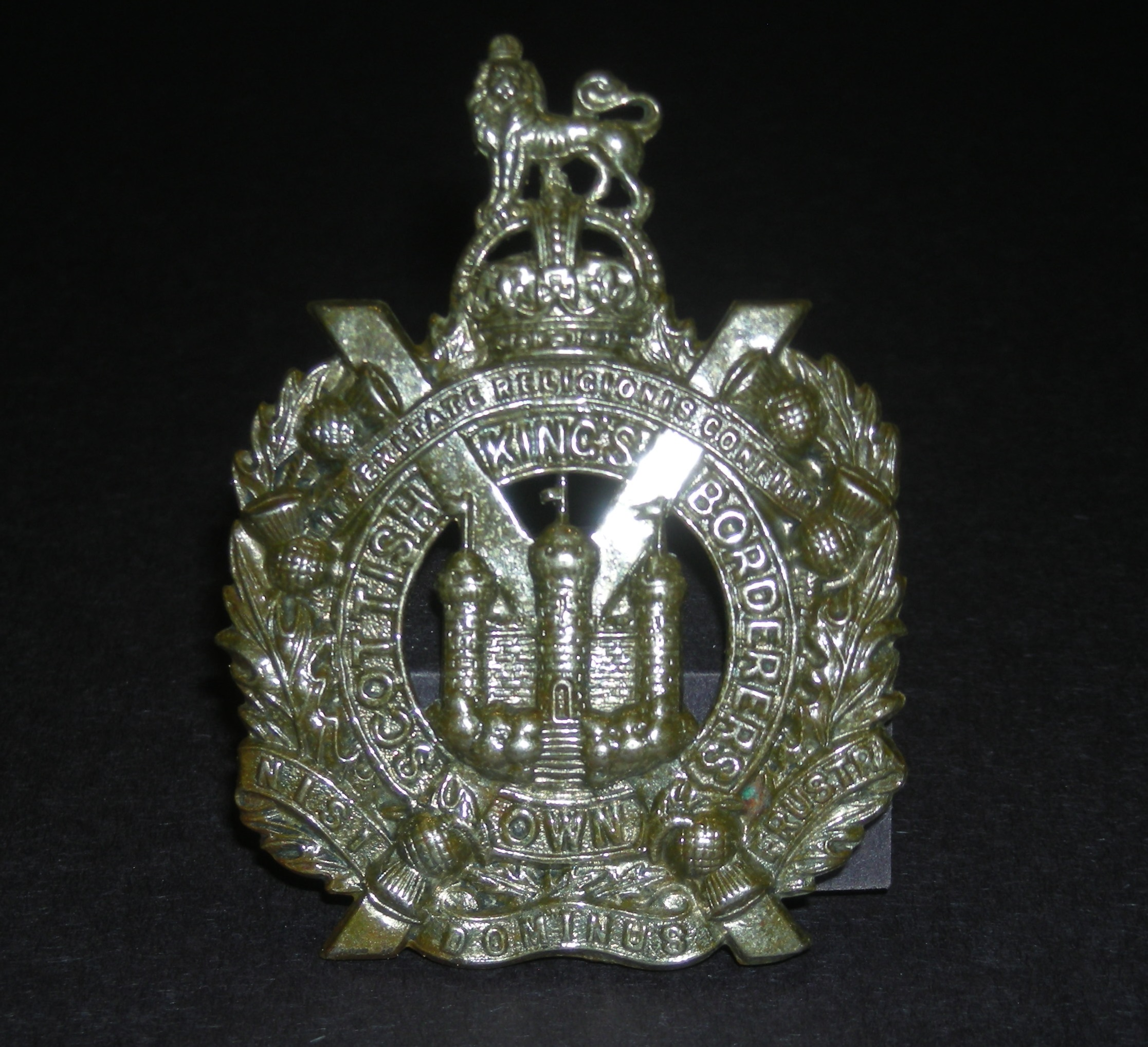
Cap badge, King's Own Scottish Borderers

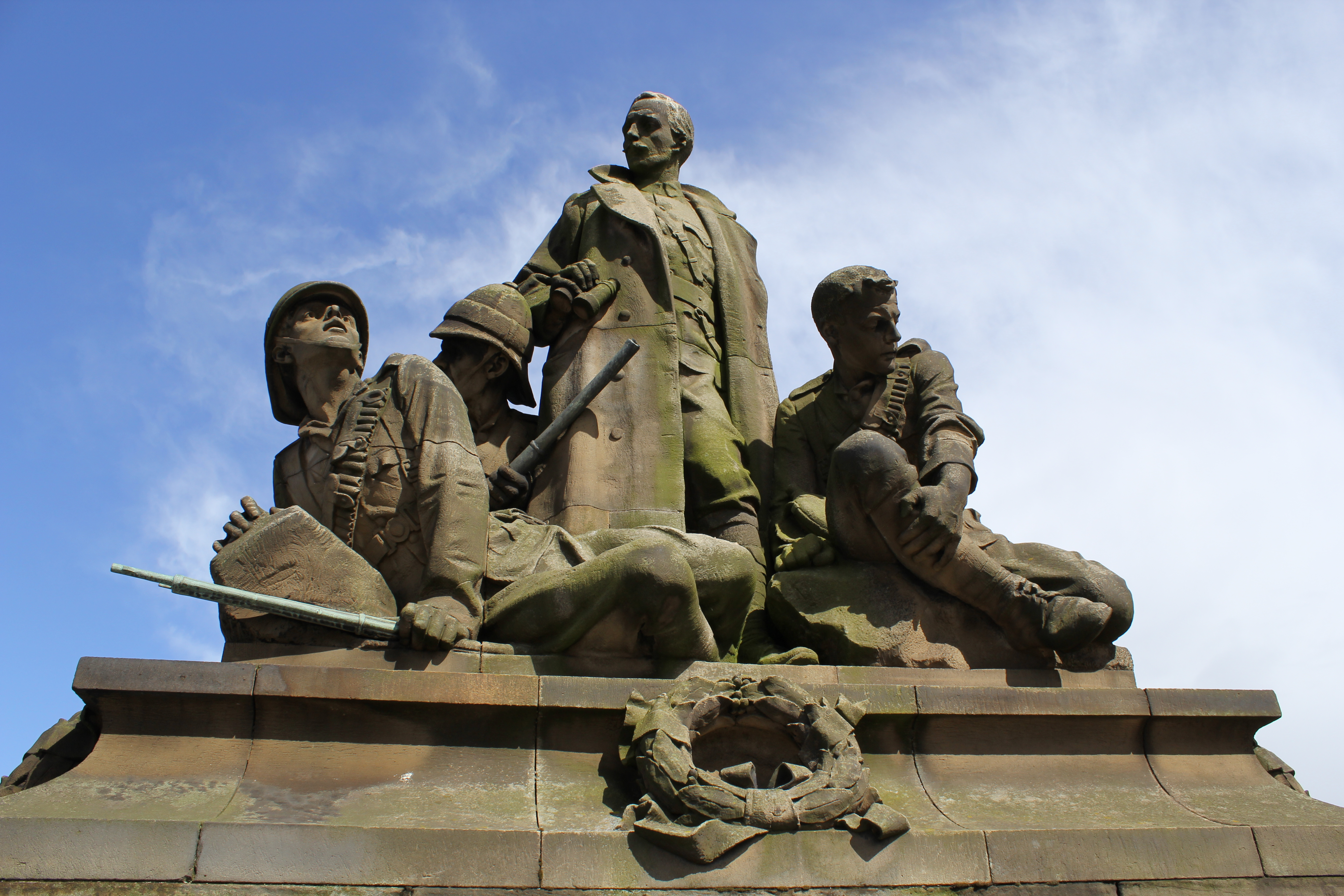
King's Own Scottish Borderers Memorial, North Bridge Edinburgh
