= Heartbreak Express =

Studio album by Dolly Parton
- Released: March 29, 1982
- Recorded: December 1981–January 1982
- Studio: Smoketree Ranch (Chatsworth)
- Genre: Country
- Length: 35:29
- Label: RCA Victor
- Producer: Dolly Parton

Dolly Parton chronology
9 to 5 and Odd Jobs (1980)	Heartbreak Express (1982)	The Best Little Whorehouse in Texas (1982)

Singles from Heartbreak Express
- 1. "Single Women" Released: February 1, 1982; 2. "Heartbreak Express" Released: May 3, 1982; 3. "Do I Ever Cross Your Mind" Released: July 12, 1982

Professional ratings
Review scores
Source	Rating
AllMusic	3/5 stars
Robert Christgau	B−
The Encyclopedia of Popular Music	2/5 stars

Heartbreak Express is the twenty-fourth solo studio album by American entertainer Dolly Parton. It was released on March 29, 1982, by RCA Records. The album returned Parton to a more fully realized country sound (a process she had begun on the previous year's 9 to 5 and Odd Jobs), after her late 1970s pop recordings. The album's first single, "Single Women", a slow-tempo honkytonk ballad about a singles bar, was written by Saturday Night Live writer Michael O'Donoghue, and had previously appeared in an SNL skit in late 1980. The single provided a top ten single for Parton. The title cut also was a top ten hit for her. "Do I Ever Cross Your Mind" (a song Parton had written in the early 1970s but had never officially recorded) appeared as a double-A-sided single (along with Parton's rerecording of "I Will Always Love You" from the Best Little Whorehouse in Texas), and reached No. 1 on the country charts in August 1982.

"Hollywood Potters", Parton has explained to interviewers, came out of her experience filming the movie 9 to 5, as Parton watched many of the film's extras and bit players, who had worked very hard at acting through the years, but with very little success. Heartbreak Express was re-released in digital format in 2013.

== Track listing ==
All tracks are written by Dolly Parton except as noted.

No.	Title	Writer(s)	Length
1.	"Heartbreak Express"		3:13
2.	"Single Women"	Michael O'Donoghue	3:44
3.	"My Blue Ridge Mountain Boy"		3:49
4.	"As Much As Always"		3:01
5.	"Do I Ever Cross Your Mind"		4:01
6.	"Release Me"	Eddie Miller, Dub Williams, Robert Yount	3:27
7.	"Barbara on Your Mind"		3:09
8.	"Act Like a Fool"		3:24
9.	"Prime of Our Love"		3:46
10.	"Hollywood Potters"		3:55
Total length:			35:29

== Personnel ==
- Dolly Parton – vocals
- Albert Lee, Fred Tackett, Jeff Baxter, Mike Severs, Steve Cropper – guitar
- Abraham Laboriel, Leland Sklar, Nathan East – bass
- Joe McGuffee – steel guitar
- Buddy Spicher – fiddle
- Gregg Perry – dulcimer, backing vocals
- Red Young, Ron Oates – keyboards
- Eddy Anderson – drums
- Lenny Castro – congas
- Terry McMillan – harmonica
- Alex Brown, Anita Ball, Denise Maynelli, Gene Morford, Jim Salestrom, Richard Dennison, Roy Galloway, Stephanie Spruill, Willie Greene Jr. – backing vocals
- Chuck Findley, Gary Grant, Gary Herbig, George Bohanon, Jim Horn, Slyde Hyde, Tom Saviano, Tom Scott – horns
- Herb Ritts – Photography

== Major releases ==
Format	Imprint	Catalogue No.	Territory	Year
Promo	RCA	RCALP 3076	United Kingdom	1982
LP	RCA	RCALP 3076	United Kingdom	1982
LP	RCA	AHL1-14289	United States	1982
LP	RCA	HL 14289	France	1982
LP	RCA Italiana S.p.A.	PL 14389	Italy	1982
CD Reissue	RCA	54289-2	Europe	2010

== Chart performance ==
Album

Chart (1982)	Peak position
US Top Country Albums (Billboard)	5
US Billboard 200	106
Swedish Albums (Sverigetopplistan)	41
US Cashbox Country Albums	7
US Cash Box Top Albums	127

Album (Year-End)

Chart (1982)	Peak Position
US Top Country Albums (Billboard)	32
