= Hard Candy Christmas =

Single by Dolly Parton

from the album The Best Little Whorehouse in Texas
- B-side: "Me and Little Andy"
- Released: October 11, 1982
- Recorded: 1982
- Genre: Country
- Length: 3:50; 3:35 (single edit)
- Label: RCA Victor
- Songwriter: Carol Hall
- Producer: Greg Perry

Dolly Parton singles chronology
"Do I Ever Cross Your Mind" (1982)	"Hard Candy Christmas" (1982)	"Potential New Boyfriend" (1983)

"Hard Candy Christmas" is a song written by songwriter Carol Hall for the musical The Best Little Whorehouse in Texas.

Near the end of the original play, individual girls of the brothel sing lines of the verses as they are preparing to leave; they join together on the refrains. This pattern was adopted for the film version of the musical, except that Dolly Parton (who played Miss Mona) is featured as soloist on the refrains, with the girls accompanying her. A further variation can be found on the soundtrack album for the film in which Parton alone sings the verses.

Parton's version of the song was released as a single in October 1982, reaching number 8 on the U.S. country singles chart in January 1983. This version was also featured on original releases of Greatest Hits, but was replaced on subsequent re-releases by Islands in the Stream. 1998, the song re-entered the country charts and peaked at number 73 based on unsolicited airplay. Parton's recording received some airplay on country stations around the holiday seasons during the 1980s and 1990s, and she also performed the song on Bob Hope's Christmas Special in 1988. During the late 1990s, when RCA reissued Parton's 1984 holiday album with Kenny Rogers, Once Upon a Christmas, Parton's recording of "Hard Candy Christmas" was added to the track list.

Hard candy encompasses a large array of inexpensive sweet treats like candy canes and lollipops. The phrase "hard candy Christmas" refers to a time when families who did not have much money could only afford to give hard candy or penny candy (bulk confectionery) to their children at Christmas. The hard candy metaphor suggests that life can simultaneously be hard and sweet.

== Chart performance ==
=== Dolly Parton ===
Chart (1982–1983)	Peak position
US Hot Country Songs (Billboard)	8
Canadian Country Tracks (RPM)	27
Chart (1998)	Peak position
US Hot Country Songs (Billboard)	73

=== Cyndi Lauper ===
Chart (2016)	Peak position
US Adult Contemporary (Billboard)	27

== Certifications ==
Region	Certification	Certified units/sales
United States (RIAA)	Gold	500,000^{‡}
^{‡} Sales+streaming figures based on certification alone.

== Covers ==
In 1997, the song was covered by RuPaul on the album Ho, Ho, Ho featuring Michelle Visage and Barbara Mitchell. The song has also been recorded by indie rocker Dan Bryk, and former Sixpence None The Richer vocalist Leigh Nash on their respective 2006 releases Christmas Record and Wishing for This.

The Venture Bros. released a version of the song in 2005 as performed by Henchmen Nos. 21 and 24 and The Monarch.

June Carter Cash performed the song on the 1982 Johnny Cash Christmas special on CBS Television.

In 2001, the song was covered by The Torpedoes on their CD Hard Rock Candy Christmas.

In 2008, Kristine W released a dance cover version, remixed by Paul Goodyear, on her EP Hey Mr. Christmas.

In 2012, Tracey Thorn recorded a version of the song for her Christmas album Tinsel and Lights.

In 2014, LeAnn Rimes recorded a version of the song for her Christmas EP One Christmas: Chapter 1.

In 2015, Cyndi Lauper recorded a cover of the song for her 2016 album Detour as a duet with Alison Krauss.

In 2016, Reba McEntire recorded a cover of the song for her 2016 album My Kind of Christmas.

In 2016, The Nymphs's Inger Lorre, Eric James Contreras, and Marshall O’boy recorded a cover of the song for Amazon's Acoustic Christmas album.

In 2020, Liz Callaway included a cover of "Hard Candy Christmas" on her 2020 Christmas album, Comfort and Joy (An Acoustic Christmas). Also, Ralph recorded a cover of this song as a single.

Zach Top recorded a cover of the song in 2023.
