= Somerset M. Wiseman Clarke =

Lieutenant-General Somerset Molyneux Wiseman-Clarke CB (born Wiseman Clarke, changed by deed poll in 1873; 11 June 1830 – 30 July 1905) served as Acting Governor of Jamaica in 1883 and Commander of the Troops, Belfast District (1887).

His fighting career included the Crimean War, where he was part of the 'thin red line' at the Battle of Balaclava (25 October 1854), and he later served during the Indian Mutiny, including at the Relief of Lucknow. He attained the rank of lieutenant general (1892) and was made a Companion of the Order of the Bath (1887 Jubilee Honours).

He was given the colonelcy of the King's Own Scottish Borderers from 1903 to his death in 1905.

Clarke was the author of A short personal narrative of the doings of the 93rd, Sutherland Highlanders from 1857 to 1st March 1859 (London, 1898), a record of his regiment's experience during the Indian Mutiny.

Military offices
Preceded by William Craig Emilius Napier	Colonel of the King's Own Scottish Borderers; 1903–1905	Succeeded by Frederick Forestier-Walker
