= Bachelor Creek =

Bachelor Creek may refer to:

- Bachelor Creek (Missouri)
- Bachelor Creek (South Dakota)
