= Henry Somerset (British Army officer) =

Lieutenant-General Sir Henry Somerset KCB KH
- Born: 30 December 1794
- Died: 15 February 1862 (aged 67)
- Spouse: Frances Sarah Heathcote
- Military career
- Allegiance: United Kingdom
- Branch: British Army
- Rank: Lieutenant-General
- Commands: Bombay Army
- Awards: Knight Commander of the Order of the Bath; Knight of the Royal Guelphic Order

Lieutenant-General Sir Henry Somerset KCB KH (30 December 1794 – 15 February 1862) was a British Army officer.

== Military career ==
Born the eldest son of Lord Charles Somerset, Somerset was commissioned a cornet on 5 December 1811 and promoted to lieutenant on 30 December 1812. He fought in the Peninsular War and with the 18th Hussars at Waterloo, serving as aide-de-camp to his uncle Lord Edward Somerset. On 6 October 1815, he was made a captain.

Soon after his marriage, Somerset proceeded to the Cape Colony, where his father was governor, and served with the Cape Mounted Rifles throughout the Xhosa Wars. On 25 March 1823, he was made major, and on 17 July 1824, lieutenant-colonel. In 1834, he was made a Knight of the Royal Guelphic Order, and later a Companion of the Bath.

In 1846, he defeated the Xhosa on the Gwangu, and was promoted major-general on 11 November 1851. At the conclusion of the 8th Xhosa War in 1853, he was made a Knight Commander of the Bath for his services, and left the Cape to go on the staff of the Bombay Army. He served as the Commander-in-chief of the Bombay Army from 26 March 1855 to March 1860, and then returned to England. On 29 January 1857 he was promoted lieutenant-general. He died in Gibraltar in 1862.

== Family ==
On 1 April 1817, he married Frances Sarah Heathcote (21 June 1790 – 16 March 1886), the eldest daughter of Admiral Sir Henry Heathcote, with whom he had seven daughters and three sons:

1. Leonora Louisa Somerset (15 December 1824 - 28 September 1913), who was married to Lt-Gen. Montague Cholmeley Johnstone (3 March 1804 – 22 September 1874) on 31 December 1844, with whom she had nine children (Charles Mosley, editor, Burke's Peerage and Baronetage, 106th edition, volume 1, page 221).
2. Col. Charles Henry Somerset (1819 – 4 November 1863), who married Christina Emma Thompson in 1848 and had issue, including Henry Plantagenet Somerset, pioneer pastoralist and politician in Queensland, Australia.
3. Col. Henry George Edward Somerset (28 December 1829 – 5 April 1920), who married Harriette Lade Coast on 15 October 1853 and had issue.
4. FitzRoy MacLean Henry Somerset (1 November 1839 – 29 June 1907), who married Ellen Amelia Arnot on 18 July 1867 and had issue.
5. Elizabeth Harriet Frances Somerset (1818 – 9. Nov 1869); who married on 21 September 1841 Maj.-Gen. Peter Maclean

Somerset stood as godfather to Henry Somerset Todd, who, in turn, transmitted the Somerset name to W. Somerset Maugham.

Military offices
Preceded by Lord Frederick FitzClarence	C-in-C, Bombay Army; 1855–1860	Succeeded by Sir Hugh Rose
Preceded by Sir W. Burney	Colonel of the Cape Mounted Rifles; 1839–1850	Succeeded by Sutton
Preceded by Henry Frederick Campbell	Colonel of the 25th (the King's Own Borderers) Regiment of Foot; 1856–1862	Succeeded by Henry Dive Townshend
