= Do I Ever Cross Your Mind =

1976 song by Dolly Parton

Song by Chet Atkins and Dolly Parton

from the album The Best of Chet Atkins & Friends
- Released: November 29, 1976
- Recorded: September 3, 1976
- Studio: RCA Victor Studio (Nashville)
- Genre: Country
- Length: 2:39
- Label: RCA Victor
- Songwriter: Dolly Parton

"Do I Ever Cross Your Mind" is a song written by American singer-songwriter Dolly Parton. She performed it live throughout the 1970s. In 1976, it was released as a duet with Chet Atkins on his album, The Best of Chet Atkins & Friends. In 1982, Heartbreak Express included a solo version as the album's third single that July, a double A-side release with "I Will Always Love You" from The Best Little Whorehouse in Texas soundtrack. The song charted only as the flip-side throughout the single's run on Billboard Hot Country Songs. In 1994, Parton recorded the song a third time with Emmylou Harris and Linda Ronstadt, which appears on Trio II (1999) and as one of three singles released simultaneously from the album.

== Chet Atkins version ==
Composed in the early 1970s (the song's copyright lists a 1973 date), Parton first recorded it as a duet with Chet Atkins, for Atkins' 1976 album The Best of Chet Atkins & Friends. The solo recording would become one of three tracks from Heartbreak Express to enter the top 10 in the country music singles chart.

"The Best of Chet Atkins & Friends" was published by RCA Victor under the catalogue number APL1-1985.
Heartbreak Express was published by RCA Victor under the catalogue number RCALP 3076.

== Dolly Parton version ==
"Do I Ever Cross Your Mind"

Single by Dolly Parton

from the album Heartbreak Express
- A-side: "I Will Always Love You"
- Released: July 12, 1982
- Recorded: c. December 1981
- Genre: Country
- Length: 4:01
- Label: RCA Victor
- Songwriter: Dolly Parton
- Producer: Dolly Parton

Dolly Parton singles chronology
| "I Will Always Love You" (1982) | "Do I Ever Cross Your Mind" (1982) | "Hard Candy Christmas" (1982) |

Beginning in the 1970s, RCA acknowledged Parton's twin appeal to pop- and country music audiences by packaging a number of her singles as double A-sides—pairing a mainstream commercial hit with a more traditional country number of roughly equal chart potential, with the A side released to pop radio, and the B side targeted toward country. Following this formula, RCA paired "Do I Ever Cross Your Mind" with another re-recorded single--"I Will Always Love You", from the Best Little Whorehouse in Texas soundtrack album —previously released on Parton's 1974 album Jolene.

Released on July 12, 1982, the double-A side was well-received. The single peaked at number one on the Billboard country singles chart on October 16, 1982, credited as "I Will Always Love You" / "Do I Ever Cross Your Mind".

== Television ==
"Do I Ever Cross Your Mind" was performed by American Idol (Season 7) finalist Ramiele Malubay in 2008. She sang the song during the Dolly Parton tribute week.

The Chet Atkins version plays over the closing credits of "Women and God"—the third episode of the BBC comedy Bob Servant, Independent. The episode first aired on February 6, 2013, on BBC Four .
