= Bachelor's Walk massacre =

Massacre at Dublin, 1914

Coordinates: 53.3471°N 6.2612°W

- Location: Bachelors Walk
- Date: 26 July 1914
- Weapons: Baton, Rifle
- Deaths: 4
- Injuries: 30+
- Perpetrator: King's Own Scottish Borderers

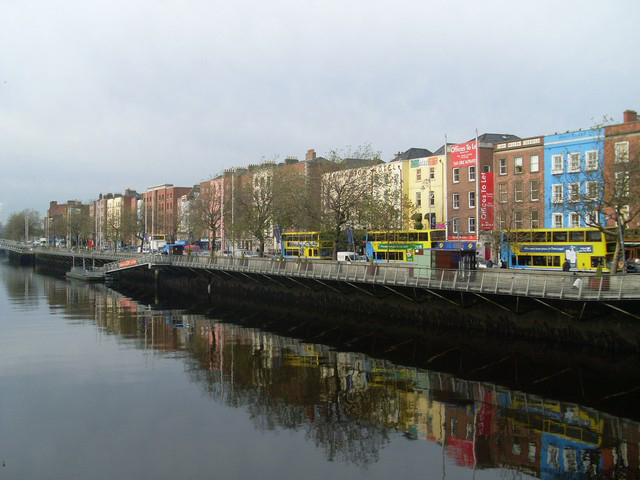
Bachelor's Walk in 2009 as seen from O'Connell Bridge

The Bachelor's Walk massacre occurred in Dublin, on 26 July 1914, when a column of troops of the King's Own Scottish Borderers opened fire on a crowd on Bachelor's Walk. The incident, which followed the Howth gun-running operation, resulted in the deaths of four civilians and injuries to more than 30 more.

== History ==
The Bachelor's Walk massacre followed shortly after the Howth gun-running which involved the landing of 1,500 rifles and ammunition, purchased for the Irish Volunteers in Hamburg in May 1914. In a counter operation to the Unionists running guns into Ulster, Erskine Childers landed the cargo in Howth and a thousand rifle-carrying Irish Volunteers marched into Dublin. The quantity was negligible when compared to the far greater numbers of weapons landed and distributed by the Ulster Volunteers, completely without hindrance, but the reaction this time was severe from the British ruling authorities.

After previously being involved in an attempted seizure of the imported weapons, a column of troops from the King's Own Scottish Borderers were marching back to their barracks. After some verbal baiting, the soldiers attacked a gathering of "hostile but unarmed" protesters on Bachelor's Walk with rifle fire and bayonets – resulting in the deaths of four civilians and injuries to in excess of 30 more. The four killed were Mary Duffy (50), Patrick Quinn (50), James Brennan (18) and Sylvester Pidgeon (40) who succumbed to his wounds on 24 September. One of those shot was Luke Kelly, the father of folk singer Luke Kelly.

The incident proved a moment of political opportunity for Irish nationalists as it sharply brought out the different treatment for the Unionists and for unarmed Dublin civilians. Patrick Pearse declared, "The army is an object of odium, and the Volunteers are the heroes of the hour. The whole movement, the whole country, has been re-baptised by bloodshed for Ireland".

The Royal Commission on the day's events determined that the police and army did not act according to the law and that the soldiers were not in sufficient danger to justify the use to firearms.
