= Ralph (EP) =

EP by Ralph
- Released: March 3, 2017
- Genre: Synth-pop
- Length: 20:14
- Label: 604
- Producers: Derek Hoffman; Mike Wise

Ralph chronology
| Ralph (2017) | A Good Girl (2018) |

Singles from Ralph
- 1. "Cold to the Touch" Released: May 25, 2016; 2. "Something More" Released: August 3, 2016; 3. "Busy Man" Released: October 24, 2016; 4. "Tease" Released: February 15, 2017

Ralph is the self-titled debut EP by Canadian singer-songwriter Ralph. It was released on March 3, 2017 by 604 Records. The EP spawned four singles, "Cold to the Touch", "Something More", "Busy Man" and "Tease".

== Background and release ==
In 2015, Ralph self-released her debut single "Trouble", which got her noticed by and signed to label 604 Records. She then decided to discard her previous songs and started working on a new project from scratch: "I realized I had been emotionally disconnected to my other tracks because I wasn't really writing them, I was just top lining. This moment fully changed the project and I ditched all my old songs and amicably parted ways with the guy I had been working with."

After releasing four consecutive singles, she finally announced her self-titled debut EP Ralph, which was released on March 3, 2017.

== Singles ==
The first single "Cold to the Touch" was released on May 25, 2016. The singer had shared a self-made video for the song, which was later removed, due to it receiving an official music video directed by Gemma Warren, almost a year later on May 17, 2017.

"Something More" was released on August 3, 2016 as the second single from the EP. The song, which was inspired by Aziz Ansari's Netflix show Master of None, had its music video premiered on October 7, becoming her first official video to be released on Vevo.

On October 24, 2016, the third single "Busy Man" was released.

"Tease", the fourth and final single from the EP, was announced on February 14, 2017, through her official Facebook page. The next day, on February 15, the single was released alongside a music video, also directed by Gemma Warren.

== Promotion ==
On March 22, 2017, Ralph held a launch party at Drake Underground in Toronto, where she performed a few songs from her EP to a sold out crowd.

== Reception ==
Despite not entering any official charts, the EP had a positive reception on streaming services. As of September 2017, the songs "Cold to the Touch" and "Something More" had gathered over five million streams on Spotify.

== Track listing ==
All songs produced by Derek Hoffman and Mike Wise.

| No. | Title | Length |
|---|---|---|
| 1. | "Cold to the Touch" | 3:25 |
| 2. | "Busy Man" | 3:29 |
| 3. | "Tease" | 3:31 |
| 4. | "Crocodile Tears" | 3:38 |
| 5. | "Something More" | 3:21 |
| 6. | "Lit the Fire" | 2:50 |
| Total length: | | 20:14 |

== Release history ==
| Region | Date | Format | Label | Ref. |
|---|---|---|---|---|
| Canada | March 3, 2017 | CD, Digital download | 604 Records | |
