= Henry Dive Townshend =

British Army officer (1795–1882)

General Henry Dive Townshend (6 October 1795 – 22 September 1882) was a British Army officer.

He was the son of John Stanislaus Townshend of Trevallyn Hall, near Rossett, Wrexham and entered the British Army by purchase in 1812 as an ensign in the 41st Foot. He took part in the American War of 1812, being present at the capture of Fort Niagara, Blackrock and Buffalo. He was also at the Battle of Lundy's Lane and the Siege of Fort Erie, where he was badly wounded.

He returned with the regiment to Europe, transferred to the 24th (2nd Warwickshire) Regiment of Foot and was promoted Captain in 1821 and Major in 1835. During the Canadian rebellion of 1837 he commanded troops, with the local rank of Colonel, in both the Upper and Lower Provinces. He was made Lieutenant-colonel in 1841, Colonel in 1851, Major-general in 1857 and Lieutenant-general in 1864.

In 1862 he was given the colonelcy of the 25th (King's Own Borderers) Regiment of Foot, a position he held until his death. He was promoted full General on 31 December 1871.

He died unmarried at his home in Rossett in 1882.

Military offices
Preceded by Sir Henry Somerset	Colonel of the 25th (King's Own Borderers) Regiment of Foot; 1862–1882	Succeeded by William Craig Emilius Napier
