= Bachelor Peak =

Mountain in Texas, United States

Coordinates: 30.9943°N 98.0972°W

Bachelor Peak (elevation: 1,342 feet (409 m)) is a summit in Burnet County, Texas, in the United States.

Two versions of the origin of the name exist, but both involve groups of bachelors visiting the mountain.
