= Lillian Lewis Batchelor =

American librarian and educational reformer

- Batchelor in 1930
- Born: November 17, 1907; Camden, New Jersey, U.S.
- Died: June 28, 1977 (aged 69); Moorestown, New Jersey

Lillian Lewis Batchelor (November 17, 1907 – June 28, 1977) was an American librarian, known for her advocacy for the creation and proper staffing of elementary school libraries. She was president of the American Association of School Librarians and served as a councilor to the American Library Association.

Batchelor worked in libraries since high school, and was a public and school librarian in New Jersey and Pennsylvania before becoming the supervisor of high school libraries for the Philadelphia School District's Board of Education. She served in this position from 1948 through 1966 when she became the Assistant Director of Libraries for the district.

She was also an adjunct professor at Drexel University's School of Library Science.

She was formative in creating the American Association of School Librarians's Standards for School Library Programs in 1960.

Batchelor is also credited with creating 166 elementary school libraries within Philadelphia throughout the mid 1960s. These libraries were created, but were difficult to staff with trained librarians; Batchelor, through her work with Drexel University, created an internship program to educate school librarians, a position partially funded by the Philadelphia School District's Board of Education.

Batchelor wanted librarians to look at books as "the gunpowder of the mind" to encourage and excite young people. She was an early advocate of instructional materials centers, which combined traditional libraries with ways to access multimedia materials useful for teaching.

She was particularly interested in students who were motivated and/or gifted and edited and assembled a collection of papers, Reading Guidance for the Gifted in 1962. Designed to be useful to the non-specialist, this collection combined theory and practice to encourage schools to have enrichment activities for their gifted pupils.

== Early life and education ==
Batchelor was born in Camden, New Jersey to parents Albert Kirk and Estella May Lewis. Her husband was Howard I. Batchelor, a podiatrist. She earned both a Bachelor of Science degree from the University of Pennsylvania and a library science degree from the Drexel Institute of Technology in 1930. She earned her masters of arts degree from Columbia University in 1946 and her doctorate in 1952 from the same university.

== Death ==
Batchelor died on June 28, 1977, at her home in Moorestown, New Jersey.
