= The Bachelor Vietnam =

- Anh chàng độc thân
- Genre: Dating game show
- Created by: Mike Fleiss
- Presented by: Khôi Trần
- Country of origin: Vietnam
- Original language: Vietnamese
- No. of seasons: 1
- No. of episodes: 14

Production
- Executive producer: Danny Do
- Running time: 45–50 minutes (2018–present)
- Production companies: HappyCanvas; Fusion3 Media

Original release
- Network: HTV7
- Release: 14 August 2018 – present

Related
- The Bachelor

The Bachelor Vietnam - Anh chàng độc thân (Single guy) is a Vietnamese reality television adaptation of the American series The Bachelor that debuted 14 August 2018 on Ho Chi Minh City Television channel 7 (HTV7).

== Plot ==
The program has a format similar to the American version, with 24 women competing for a single man to be selected as his romantic partner. Through the series, he learns more about each contestant. At the end of each episode, the candidates will be awarded a rose by the bachelor, symbolizing their continued stay in the contest. On the other hand, candidates who do not receive a rose are eliminated and leave the program.

== Seasons ==
#	Original run	Bachelor	Winner	Runner(s)-up	Proposal	Still together	Relationship notes
1	14 August–13 November 2018	Nguyễn Quốc Trung	Bùi Thùy Dương	Kiều Trang	No	Yes	Thùy Dương revealed that she had been previously married and is now a single mother, causing her title's taken away.

== Same-sex couple ==
The show garnered worldwide attention when contestant Minh Thu confessed her love for another contestant, Truc Nhu, instead of the show's "bachelor". While Nhu stayed on the show until her elimination, she and Minh Thu got into a romantic relationship afterward.
