= Bachelor Creek (South Dakota) =

Stream in South Dakota, U.S.

Coordinates: 43°55′34″N 96°41′10″W

Bachelor Creek is a stream in the U.S. state of South Dakota.

Bachelor Creek was named for the fact a large share of the early settlers on the stream were bachelors.

== See also ==
- List of rivers of South Dakota
