= Bachelor Mountain =

Bachelor Mountain may refer to:

- Bachelor Mountain (Riverside County), in western Riverside County, California
- Mount Bachelor, approximately 22 miles west of Bend, Oregon; called Bachelor Mountain in the 1911 Encyclopedia Britannica
