= The Bachelors (disambiguation) =

The Bachelors are an Irish music group formed in 1957.

The Bachelors may also refer to:

- The Bachelors (Stifter novel), an 1844 novel by Adalbert Stifter
- The Bachelors (Spark novel), a 1960 novel by Muriel Spark
- The Bachelors (1953 film), a Mexican musical comedy film
- The Bachelors (2017 film), an American comedy-drama film
- The Bachelors (Australian TV series), an Australian spinoff television series of The Bachelor
  - The Bachelors (Australian season 10), the tenth season of the reality television series
  - The Bachelors (Australian season 11), the eleventh season of the reality television series
- It's a Great Life (TV series), a 1950s American sitcom that aired in syndication as The Bachelors
- Bobby Taylor & the Vancouvers, a Canadian soul band originally known as Little Daddy and the Bachelors

== See also ==
- Bachelor (disambiguation)
- Batchelors, a soup company
