= Heartbreak Express (song) =

Single by Dolly Parton

from the album Heartbreak Express
- B-side: "Act Like a Fool"
- Released: May 3, 1982
- Recorded: 1981
- Genre: Country
- Length: 3:14
- Label: RCA
- Songwriter: Dolly Parton
- Producer: Greg Perry

Dolly Parton singles chronology
"Single Women" (1982)	"Heartbreak Express" (1982)	"I Will Always Love You" (1982)

"Heartbreak Express" is a song written and recorded by American entertainer Dolly Parton. It was released in May 1982 as the second single and title track from her album Heartbreak Express. The song peaked at number 7 on the U.S. country chart.

== Content ==
The song tells the story of a woman who bids farewell to a failed relationship and departs on the "Heartbreak Express".

== Chart performance ==
Chart (1982)	Peak position
US Hot Country Songs (Billboard)	7
Canadian RPM Country Tracks	1
