= Bachelor in Paradise =

Bachelor in Paradise may refer to:

- Bachelor in Paradise (film), a 1961 American film starring Bob Hope and Lana Turner
- Bachelor in Paradise (American TV series), a 2014 ABC reality series and part of The Bachelor franchise
- Bachelor In Paradise (Australian TV series), the Australian version of the series
- Bachelor in Paradise Canada, the Canadian version of the series
