= Gary Batchelor =

Canadian soccer player

Personal information
- Place of birth: Winnipeg, Canada

International career
Years	Team	Apps	(Gls)
1973	Canada	3	(0)

Gary Batchelor is a Canadian former international soccer player.
