= Doug Batchelor =

American pastor

- Born: Douglas E. Batchelor; March 9, 1957 (age 69); U.S.
- Education: Pacific Union College
- Occupations: Pastor; evangelist; author
- Spouse: Karen Batchelor
- Children: 5
- Writing career
- Subjects: Bible prophecy; Christian living; theology
- Movement: Seventh-day Adventist Church

Douglas E. Batchelor (born March 9, 1957) is an American pastor, evangelist, author. He is the current president and speaker of Amazing Facts.

== Early life ==
Doug Batchelor was born to philanthropist and founder of Arrow Air George Batchelor; and his journalist, songwriter, film critic, television critic wife Ruth on March 9, 1957, in Los Angeles. As an adolescence he was very rebellious against his parents who at that time were divorced, he ran away and dropped out of school multiple times. Batchelor had a substance abuse problem and was arrested by the police multiple times for his crimes. As a man he lived in a cave outside of Palm Springs, California and started to read a Bible that was left by someone.

== Education ==
After he became a Seventh-day Adventist he went to school at Pacific Union College.

== Career ==
In 1994, Batchelor became the president and speaker of Amazing Facts after founder Joe Crews died. His sermons can be watched on the Amazing Facts website and YouTube, podcasts can be downloaded from the internet, listened to on the radio, watched on television, satellite television, downloaded as a mobile app and available on smart TV. Batchelor is the former pastor of the Sacramento Central Seventh-day Adventist Church; and he then became founder of the Granite Bay Hilltop Seventh-day Adventist Church and its pastor.

In June 2016, he and many other Christian leaders were invited by Ben Carson, to New York City to interview Donald Trump.

== Personal life ==
Batchelor is of Cherokee and Jewish descent. After becoming a Seventh-day Adventist, he became a vegetarian and later a vegan.

== Works ==
- Batchelor, Doug (1992). Seven Steps to Salvation: Practical ideas for making Christ a permanent part of your life. Pacific Press Publishing Association. ISBN 0816310718.
- Batchelor, Doug; Lifshay, Karen (1994). How to Survive in a Dead Church: And other congregational hazards to your spiritual health. Pacific Press Publishing Association. ISBN 0816311978.
- Batchelor, Doug; Lifshay, Karen (1998). How to Survive and Thrive! in Church. Mountain Ministry. ISBN 0966810503.
- Batchelor, Doug (2000). At Jesus' Feet: The Gospel According to Mary Magdalene. Review and Herald Publishing Association. ISBN 0828015899.
- Batchelor, Doug (2001). Who do you think you are? Finding life through real faith. Amazing Facts. ISBN 0816324158.
- Batchelor, Doug (2001). To See The King: Seven Steps to Salvation. Mountain Ministry. ISBN 0966810511.
- Batchelor, Doug (2002). Who Will Sing the Song: Understanding the 144,000. Amazing Facts. ISBN 1580191444.
- Batchelor, Doug (2002). The Christian & Alcohol. Amazing Facts. ISBN 1580191460.
- Batchelor, Doug (2002). The Last Elijah Message: Essentials for Revival. Amazing Facts. ISBN 158019155X.
- Batchelor, Doug; Wohlberg, Steve (2002). Spiritual Israel. Amazing Facts. ISBN 1580191533.
- Batchelor, Doug (2002). The Book of Amazing Facts Volume 1. Amazing Facts. ISBN 1580191509.
- Gibbs, Gary; Batchelor, Doug (2003). Winsome Witnessing: Dynamic Ways To Share Your Faith!. Media Ministries. ISBN 0972821708.
- Batchelor, Doug (2004). Advindication: Affirming The Pillars Of Our Faith. Amazing Facts. ISBN 1580191592.
- Batchelor, Doug (2005). Broken Chains: Finding Peace for the Raging Soul. Mountain Ministry. ISBN 081632042X.
- Batchelor, Doug (2005). The Armor of God. Amazing Facts. ISBN 1580191541.
- Batchelor, Doug (2005). The Amazing Facts Book of Bible Answers Volume 1. Amazing Facts. ISBN 1580191762.
- Batchelor, Doug (2005). The Book of Amazing Facts Volume 2. Amazing Facts. ISBN 1580191894.
- Batchelor, Doug; Nelson, Dwight; Quonn, Shelley; Goldstein, Clifford; Melashenko, E.; Gibson, Ty; Moore, Marin; Peeler, Emil; Kirk-Lee, Wilma; Tucker, Mike; Maxwell, Randy; Finley, Mark (2006). The Ten Commandments Under Attack. Pacific Press Publishing Association. ISBN 0816321590.
- Batchelor, Doug (2006). Holy Spirit: The Need. Amazing Facts. ISBN 1580192114.
- Batchelor, Doug (2006). The Ultimate Resource. Amazing Facts. ISBN 1580195784.
- Batchelor, Doug (2006). The Truth About Mary Magdalene: The Woman at Jesus Feet. Amazing Facts. ISBN 1580192106.
- Batchelor, Doug (2007). Teach Us to Pray. Amazing Facts. ISBN 1580194877.
- Batchelor, Doug (2008). Determining the Will of God. Amazing Facts. ISBN 1580192823.
- Batchelor, Doug (2008). Jewelry How Much is Too Much. Amazing Facts. ISBN 1580190812.
- Batchelor, Doug (2008). The Name of God. Amazing Facts. ISBN 1580192815.
- Batchelor, Doug (2008). Anything But Secret. Amazing Facts. ISBN 1580191428.
- Batchelor, Doug (2009). God's Role for Women in Ministry. Amazing Facts. ISBN 1580192211.
- Batchelor, Doug (2009). Understanding Tongues. Amazing Facts. ISBN 1580192149.
- Batchelor, Doug (2011). 12 Steps to Revival. Amazing Facts. ISBN 1580191940.
- Batchelor, Doug (2011). Tips for Resisting Tempation. Amazing Facts. ISBN 1580191789.
- Batchelor, Doug (2011). The Trinity. Amazing Facts. ISBN 1580191614.
- Batchelor, Doug (2011). Who is Michael the Archangel. Amazing Facts. ISBN 1580193293.
- Batchelor, Doug (2011). The Two Witnesses: Moses & Elijah. Amazing Facts. ISBN 1580191797.
- Batchelor, Doug (2011). The Bible on Marriage, Divorce and Remarriage. Amazing Facts. ISBN 1580193781.
- Batchelor, Doug (2012). Caveman Theology: Salvation Made Simple. Mountain Ministry. ISBN 098467070X.
- Batchelor, Doug (2012). The Savior & The Serpent. Amazing Facts. ISBN 1580194842.
- Batchelor, Doug (2012). Prophecy for Kids. Amazing Facts. ISBN 1580195164.
- Batchelor, Doug (2012). Beyond Mercy: What is the Unpardonable Sin?. Amazing Facts. ISBN 1580195083.
- Batchelor, Doug (2012). Dare to Follow: Your Ultimate Purpose. Amazing Facts. ISBN 1580195105.
- Batchelor, Doug (2012). A World of Wonders Daily Devotional. Amazing Facts. ISBN 1580195091.
- Batchelor, Doug (2013). How To Keep The Sabbath Holy. Amazing Facts. ISBN 1580196187.
- Batchelor, Doug (2013). Compromise, Conformity, & Courage. Amazing Facts. ISBN 1580192165.
- Batchelor, Doug (2013). The Sign of Jonah. Amazing Facts. ISBN 1580191452.
- Batchelor, Doug (2013). Who are the Sons of God?. Amazing Facts. ISBN 1580195695.
- Batchelor, Doug (2013). Assurance: Justification Made Simple. Amazing Facts. ISBN 1580192025.
- Batchelor, Doug (2013). Shadows of Light: Seeing Jesus in All the Bible. Amazing Facts. ISBN 158019527X.
- Batchelor, Doug (2013). The Mystery of Mary: Mother of Jesus. Amazing Facts. ISBN 1580195237.
- Prewitt, Eugene; Batchelor, Doug (2013). Women's Ordination: 31 Popular Arguments & Biblical Answers. Amazing Facts. ISBN 1580195903.
- Batchelor, Doug (2013). Wisdom for Life: A 31-Day Devotional in Proverbs. Amazing Facts. ISBN 1580195865.
- Batchelor, Doug (2014). Final Mystery: The Truth About Death Revealed. Amazing Facts. ISBN 1580196225.
- Batchelor, Doug (2014). 365 Amazing Answers to Big Bible Questions: A Daily Devotional. Amazing Facts. ISBN 1580196276.
- Batchelor, Doug; Hall, Dwight (2014). Strange Fire: Understanding the Hot Topic of Women's Ordination. Remnant Publications. ISBN 1629130362.
- Batchelor, Doug (2015). Heroes of Faith: Inspirational Stories of Salvation. Amazing Facts. ISBN 1580196349.
- Herndon, Booton; Batchelor, Doug (2016). Hero of Hacksaw Ridge. Remnant Publications. ISBN 1629131547.
- Batchelor, Doug (2017). Should Christians Keep the Jewish Feasts?. Amazing Facts. ISBN 1580195954.
- Batchelor, Doug (2018). Exploring the Trinity One God...Or Three?. Amazing Facts. ISBN 1580196039.
- Batchelor, Doug (2019). Heading for the Hills? A Beginners Guide to Country Living. Mountain Ministry. ISBN 0984670742.
- Batchelor, Doug (2019). The All-New Book of Amazing Facts Volume 1. Amazing Facts. ISBN 1580196411.
- Batchelor, Doug (2019). The All-New Book of Amazing Facts Volume 2. Amazing Facts. ISBN 1580196152.
- Batchelor, Doug (2019). What is the Unpardonable Sin?. Amazing Facts. ISBN 1580196799.
- Batchelor, Doug (2019). Deliverance from Debt. Amazing Facts. ISBN 1580196756.
- Batchelor, Doug (2019). Prophecy Encounter. Amazing Facts. ISBN 1580196780.
- Batchelor, Doug (2019). The Rich Man and Lazarus. Amazing Facts. ISBN 1580196748.
- Batchelor, Doug (2020). The All-New Book of Amazing Facts Volume 3. Amazing Facts. ISBN 1580196993.
- Batchelor, Doug (2020). Finding Peace in a World of Worry: Bible Solutions for Stress and Anxiety. Amazing Facts. ISBN 158019723X.
- Batchelor, Doug (2020). Should a Christian Vote?. Amazing Facts. ISBN 1580197124.
- Batchelor, Doug (2020). Amazing Sanctuary. Amazing Facts. ISBN 1952505070.
- Batchelor, Doug; Ross, Jëan (2020). The Best of Bible Answers Live Volume 1. Amazing Facts. ISBN 1580197086.
- Batchelor, Doug; Ross, Jëan (2020). The Best of Bible Answers Live Volume 2. Amazing Facts. ISBN 158019687X.
- Batchelor, Doug (2021). The Power of Music in the christian life. Amazing Facts. ISBN 1952505046.
- Batchelor, Doug (2021). The Amazing Power of Forgiveness. Amazing Facts. ISBN 1952505291.
- Batchelor, Doug (2021). Choosing Life: A Christian Perspective on Suicide. Amazing Facts. ISBN 1952505259.
- Batchelor, Doug; Dolenski, Kristyn; Kellner, Mark; McBlane, Jacob; Rittenour, Curtis (2022). Revelation Verse by Verse. Amazing Facts. ISBN 1952505348.
- Batchelor, Doug (2022). Amazing Three Angels' Messages: Understanding Revelation 14. Amazing Facts. ISBN 1952505674.
- Batchelor, Doug (2023). Amazing Shadows: Types of Christ in Scripture. Amazing Facts. ISBN 1952505763.
- Batchelor, Doug (2023). The Most Amazing Bible Promises: A Daily Devotional. Amazing Facts. ISBN 1952505747.
- Batchelor, Doug (2023). The Amazing Bible Story Set. Amazing Facts and Safeliz. ISBN 8472089266.

== Books ==
- Batchelor, Doug; Tooker, Marilyn (1991). The Richest Caveman: The Doug Batchelor Story. Amazing Facts. ISBN 0816308764.
