= The Best Little Whorehouse in Texas (soundtrack) =

Soundtrack album by Various artists
- Released: July 12, 1982
- Recorded: 1981
- Genre: Soundtrack
- Length: 36:44
- Label: MCA
- Producers: Gregg Perry; based on original production and arrangements by Richard Baskin

Dolly Parton chronology
Heartbreak Express (1982)	The Best Little Whorehouse in Texas (1982)	Greatest Hits (1982)

Singles from The Best Little Whorehouse in Texas
- 1. "I Will Always Love You" Released: July 12, 1982; 2. "Hard Candy Christmas" Released: October 11, 1982

Professional ratings
Review scores
Source	Rating
AllMusic	4.5/5 stars
The Encyclopedia of Popular Music	2/5 stars

The Best Little Whorehouse in Texas is the original soundtrack for the film, released in July 1982. The album was produced by Gregg Perry.

In addition to the score of Carol Hall songs recorded for the stage soundtrack, the film soundtrack included two Dolly Parton compositions: "Sneakin' Around", which she performed as a duet with co-star Burt Reynolds and a reworking of her 1974 song "I Will Always Love You", the latter of which topped the U.S. country charts in September 1982. Unlike the original 1974 version, the 1982 release of "I Will Always Love You" crossed over to the pop charts (#53 Pop and #17 Adult Contemporary) as well.

== Track listing ==
All songs composed by Carol Hall, except where noted.

Side one
No.	Title	Writer(s)	Performer(s)	Length
1.	"20 Fans"		Jim Nabors and Chorus	4:33
2.	"A Lil' Ole Bitty Pissant Country Place"		Dolly Parton, Teresa Merritt, the Whorehouse Girls and Customers	5:26
3.	"Sneakin Around"	Dolly Parton	Parton and Burt Reynolds	1:53
4.	"Watchdog Report" / "Texas Has a Whorehouse in It"		Dom DeLuise and the Dogettes	3:04
5.	"Courtyard Shag"		(Instrumental)	3:29

Side two
No.	Title	Writer(s)	Performer(s)	Length
1.	"The Aggie Song"		Chorus	7:43
2.	"The Sidestep"		Charles Durning	3:43
3.	"Hard Candy Christmas"		Parton and the Whorehouse Girls	3:50
4.	"I Will Always Love You"	Parton	Parton	3:02

== Chart performance ==
Chart (1982)	Peak position
US Billboard 200	63
US Top Country Albums (Billboard)	5
US Cashbox Country Albums	3
US Cash Box Top Albums	48
