= Burlacul =

- Genre: Dating game show
- Based on: The Bachelor by Mike Fleiss
- Presented by: Lucian Marinescu (Season 1); Cătălin Botezatu (Seasons 2–4); Andreea Mantea (Season 5); Răzvan Fodor (Season 6)
- Theme music composer: Bobby Darin
- Opening theme: "Dream Lover"
- Country of origin: România
- No. of series: 6
- No. of episodes: 30

Production
- Running time: 120–180 minutes

Original release
- Network: Antena 1
- Release: 8 July 2010 – 1 July 2021

Burlacul is a Romanian reality television dating game show debuting in 2010 on Antena 1. The first season was hosted by Lucian Marinescu, in season 2 he was replaced by host and designer Cătălin Botezatu. From season 6 onwards, the series was hosted by Răzvan Fodor. There is one related series: Burlăcița which was hosted by Andreea Mantea in 2014 and Bianca Drăgușanu in 2011.

== Plot ==
The series revolves around a single bachelor (deemed eligible) and a pool of romantic interests (22 in season 1, 21 in season 2, and 20 in seasons 3 & 4), which could include a potential wife for the bachelor. The conflicts in the series, both internal and external, stem from the elimination-style format of the show. Early in the season, the bachelor goes on large group dates with the women, with the majority of women eliminated during rose ceremonies. As the season progresses, women are also eliminated on one-on-one dates and on elimination two-on-one dates. The process culminates with hometown visits to the families of the final four women, overnight dates, should they choose to accept, at exotic locations with the final three women, and interaction with the bachelor's family with the final two or three women. In many cases, the bachelor proposes to his final selection. The show is known for its dramatic twists, both structurally and contextually. In some cases, the bachelor may or may not follow the show's standard rose ceremony guidelines. Some bachelors, for instance, have conferred fewer roses than allotted as per standard rose ceremony procedure.

== The elimination process ==
According to the summary on Antena 1, each new Bachelor episode contains a rose ceremony during which one or more contestants are eliminated. Eliminations are based on date performance (i.e., how the women relate to the bachelor on the dates). The bachelor must follow a process of elimination wherein his pool of bachelorettes is narrowed down week by week by presenting a rose to each of the women he wishes to keep. At any point during the process, if a woman decides she is no longer interested in the bachelor, she may leave. A few have done so throughout the show. In the end, the bachelor may select only one woman for the final rose, but in season 3 all remaining contestants refused the rose and the original bachelor (Vladimir Drăghia) was eliminated.

== Season synopses ==
Season	Premiered	Bachelor	Winner	Runner(s)-Up	Proposal	Other contestants in order of elimination
1	July 8, 2010	Cătălin Botezatu	Violeta Babliuc	Mihaela Stanciu	No	Adriana Tătaru, Nina Cheța, Cristina Simion, Ioana Dumitru, Anca Alesuțan, Cristiana Szabo, Justiana Mâță, Simona Tudor, Alina Golea, Mihaela Craiu, Alina Csiki, Andrada Ersek, Carla Șuteu, Cristina Mantu, Alina Mihăilă, Alexandra Epure, Corina Costache, Melania Potlog, Roxana Robotin, Roxana Codreanu.
2	April 28, 2011	Eduard Popescu Strohlen	Ana Maria Savu	Anca Fiicanu and Cezara Darie	Yes	Ramona Neagu, Mihaela Măticiuc, Ioana Dumitru, Violeta Gheorghiță, Emanuela Tudora, Diana Dumitrecu, Andreea Buga, Daciana Magdaș, Anca Lăcătuș, Cătălina Ene, Maria Chihaia, Andra Pantazi, Luminița „Mișu” Ene, Loredana Șerban, Adelina Mihăilescu, Magdalena Vlad, Ramona Peșteleu, Raluca Racoviță.
3 (Note: Vladimir Drăghia was eliminated by contestants and he was replaced by Sergiu Barboni)	March 1, 2012	~~Vladimir Drăghia~~ Sergiu Barboni	Adelina Boe	Sasha Cristea and Irina Drăghia	No	Diana Roman, Roxana Rusu, Cristina Soare, Isabela Staic, Alexandra Centea, Andra Ceana, Daniela Belbea, Iulia Rebegea, Alexandra Popa, Elena Bulga, Raluca Iacov, Cristina Kudor Bandi, Cristina Retzler, Andra Nicolin, Andreea Zarian, Georgiana Ștefan, Alexandra Pîrîianu.
4	July 4, 2013	Bogdan Vlădău	Daciana Ciochina	Andreea Motoi	No	Adriana Chiliban, Alina Culita, Andra Nica, Corina Costache, Florina Ioniță, Iuliana Zorobot, Manuela Gaiță, Marina Gheonea, Raluca Simion, Ramona Chiticaru, Elena Dobrin, Alexa Brindiliu, Gillian Gheorghiu, Petruța Gagiu, Lorena Partale, Dorina Bojescu, Paula Minginer, Alexandra Nicolaescu.
5	January 15, 2015	Andrei Andrei	None	None	No	Alice Marica, Andra Pui, Andreea Scradeanu, Ayda Kirat, Daiana Georgescu, Monica Palivan, Monica Rusu, Roxana Bejan, Carmen Vodă, Iulia Cismaru.
6	March 5, 2021	Andy Constantin	Ana Bene	Simona Bălăceanu	No	Mădălina Alexe, Angela Antocel, Oana Barbu, Simona, Bălăceanu, Ana Bene, Bianca Bonef, Geoegeta Catrina, Iulia Cazacu, Cristina Jaşcu, Alexandra Mucea, Dominique Nuță, Roxana Răpăilă, Andreea Stoica, Vanessa Țone, Malinka Zina, Melissa, Kubra Alexandra.

== Series guide ==
=== Series 1 (2010) ===
The first series aired on Antena 1 from 8 July to 2 September 2010.

- Bachelor: Cătălin Botezatu
- WINNER: Violeta Babliuc

=== Series 2 (2011) ===
The second series aired on Antena 1 from 28 April to 23 June 2011.

- Bachelor: Eduard Popescu Strohlen
- WINNER: Ana Maria Savu

=== Series 3 (2012) ===
The third series aired on Antena 1 from 1 March to 17 May 2012.

- Bachelor: Sergiu Barboni (replaced Vladimir Drăghia after his elimination)
- WINNER: Adelina Boe

=== Series 4 (2013) ===
The fourth series aired on Antena 1 from 4 July.

- Bachelor: Bogdan Vlădau
- WINNER: Daciana Ciochina

=== Series 5 (2015) ===
The fifth series aired on Antena 1 from 15 January.

- Bachelor: Andrei Andrei
- WINNER: None

=== Series 6 (2021) ===
The sixth series will air on Antena 1.

- Bachelor: Andi Constantin
- WINNER: Ana Bene

== Controversies ==
As a worldwide The Bachelor premiere, when Vladimir Drăghia, the original bachelor was eliminated by contestants. Drăghia was replaced by male model Sergiu Barboni in next episode.

== Bachelors ==
- Season 1 - Cătălin Botezatu
- Season 2 - Eduard Popescu Strohlen
- Season 3 - ~~Vladimir Drăghia~~ (eliminated)
- Season 3 - Sergiu Barboni
- Season 4 - Bogdan Vlădău
- Season 5 - Andrei Andrei
- Season 6 - Andi Constantin
