= Single Women =

Single by Dolly Parton

from the album Heartbreak Express
- B-side: "Barbara on Your Mind"
- Released: February 1, 1982
- Recorded: 1981
- Genre: Country
- Length: 3:46
- Label: RCA
- Songwriter: Michael O'Donoghue
- Producer: Greg Perry

Dolly Parton singles chronology
"The House of the Rising Sun" (1981)	"Single Women" (1982)	"Heartbreak Express" (1982)

"Single Women" is a song, written by Saturday Night Live writer Michael O'Donoghue. The song, originally performed during an SNL sketch by Christine Ebersole on the October 10, 1981 broadcast, was later recorded by Dolly Parton for her 1982 Heartbreak Express album. Released as the album's first single in February 1982, it reached number 8 on the U.S. country singles chart in April 1982. The Parton version of the song featured somewhat reworked lyrics, as RCA requested she eliminate the drug references, fearful that they would cause the song to meet resistance on country radio.

The song later inspired a 1984 TV movie titled Single Bars, Single Women, starring Shelley Hack, Paul Michael Glaser, Mare Winningham, and Tony Danza, which was produced by O'Donoghue. An abbreviated version of Parton's recording of the song was used as the movie's theme song.

== Content ==
The song depicts a number of women looking for love in a singles bar.

== Charts ==
Chart (1982)	Peak position
US Hot Country Songs (Billboard)	8
Canadian RPM Country Tracks	1
