= John Batchelor (rugby union) =

English rugby union player

John Batchelor (born 1970) was a key member and 2nd row in the 1997–98 Exeter Rugby-Football Union squad who gained promotion to the top tier of English rugby for the first time in the squad's history.

Batchelor was born in Malabo, Equatorial Guinea but his family moved to Kingston upon Hull in England soon after his birth. He worked his way up from being captain of his school rugby team in Hull and then an important player in the Hull Ionians youth team. He moved to the Exeter Chiefs Rugby Club, where his career was made. Batchelor's great physical strength gave him an advantage over smaller players in the lower leagues of rugby. He used this great strength to carry his team up to the heights, never scaled by Exeter Rugby before, of the Aviva Premiership.
