= The Bachelor Canada season 3 =

The Bachelor Canada
- Season 3
- Starring: Chris Leroux
- Presented by: Noah Cappe
- No. of contestants: 20
- Winner: Mikaela Wightman
- Runner-up: Lyndsey Gavin
- No. of episodes: 11 (including 1 special)

Release
- Original network: W Network
- Original release: October 11 – December 20, 2017

Season chronology
- ← Previous; Season 2

The Bachelor Canada (season 3) is the third season of the W Network reality television series The Bachelor Canada. The season premiered on October 11, 2017. This season features 33-year-old Chris Leroux, a retired professional baseball player from Mississauga, Ontario.

== Bachelorettes ==
Name	Age	Hometown	Job	Eliminated
Mikaela Wightman	27	Winnipeg, Manitoba	Fashion PR	Winner
Lyndsey Gavin	23	Vancouver, British Columbia	Publicist	Episode 11 (quit)
Catie Fenn	29	Toronto, Ontario	Lawyer/Meditation Coach	Episode 8
Jessie Baker	25	Emo, Ontario	Youth Care Practitioner	Episode 7
Stacy Rae	25	Victoria, British Columbia	Restaurant Manager	Episode 7
Kait Rich	29	Victoria, British Columbia	Luxury Travel Nomad	Episode 7
Meghan House	24	Deer Lake, Newfoundland and Labrador	Waitress	Episode 6
Brittany Michalchuk	27	Calgary, Alberta	Humanitarian/Pageant Queen	Episode 6 (quit)
Lisa Mancini	24	St. Catharines, Ontario	Graphic Designer/Mermaid	Episode 5
Dee Chan	32	Kitchener, Ontario	Spray Tan Business Owner	Episode 4
Lara Campbell	27	Baltimore, Ontario	Automotive Financial Manager	Episode 4
April Phan	35	Vancouver, British Columbia	Business Analyst	Episode 3
Brittany Wiebe	29	Surrey, British Columbia	Business Owner	Episode 3
Ashley Lukow	31	Sooke, British Columbia	Registered Nurse	Episode 2
Shanti Singh	31	Winnipeg, Manitoba	Real Estate Student	Episode 2
Chelsea Brown	26	Lethbridge, Alberta	Psychiatric Nurse	Episode 1
Madelaine Gionet	33	North Bay, Ontario	Medical Secretary	Episode 1
Pricilla Mudaliar	32	Vancouver, British Columbia	Performer	Episode 1
Shaleen Sutherland	27	Toronto, Ontario	Aspiring Model/Actress	Episode 1
Stephanie Delaney	27	Dublin, Ireland	Executive Assistant	Episode 1

=== Future appearances ===
==== Bachelor in Paradise Canada ====
Season 1

Stacy Johnson and Lisa Mancini returned for the first season of Bachelor in Paradise Canada. Johnson split from Mike Ogilvie week 4. Mancini split from Connor Rogers week 5.

Season 2

Mancini returned for the second season. She split from Connor Brennan week 6.

== Call-out order ==
#	Bachelorettes	Episodes								
#	Bachelorettes	1	2	3	4	5	6	7	8	11
1	Catie	Dee	Lyndsey	Mikaela	Jessie	Brittany M.	Mikaela	Catie	Mikaela	Mikaela
2	Brittany M.	Lyndsey	Catie	Brittany M.	Mikaela	Meghan	Kait	Mikaela	Lyndsey	Lyndsey
3	Jessie	Shanti	Stacy	Kait	Catie	Lyndsey	Jessie	Lyndsey	Catie	
4	Meghan	Catie	Mikaela	Jessie	Lyndsey	Catie	Lyndsey	Jessie; Stacy		
5	Lyndsey	Mikaela	Kait	Catie	Brittany M.	Jessie	Stacy	Jessie; Stacy		
6	Dee	April	Dee	Lara	Kait	Stacy	Catie	Kait		
7	Stacy	Lara	Brittany M.	Stacy	Meghan	Mikaela	Meghan			
8	Lisa	Jessie	Meghan	Meghan	Stacy	Kait	Brittany M.			
9	Kait	Stacy	Lisa	Dee	Lisa	Lisa				
10	Mikaela	Kait	Lara	Lyndsey	Lara					
11	Shanti	Brittany M.	Brittany W.	Lisa	Dee					
12	Lara	Ashley	Jessie	April; Brittany W.						
13	Brittany W.	Brittany W.	April	April; Brittany W.						
14	Ashley	Lisa	Ashley							
15	April	Meghan	Shanti							
16	Chelsea	Chelsea; Madelaine; Pricilla; Shaleen; Stephanie								
17	Madelaine	Chelsea; Madelaine; Pricilla; Shaleen; Stephanie								
18	Pricilla	Chelsea; Madelaine; Pricilla; Shaleen; Stephanie								
19	Shaleen	Chelsea; Madelaine; Pricilla; Shaleen; Stephanie								
20	Stephanie	Chelsea; Madelaine; Pricilla; Shaleen; Stephanie								

The contestant received a first impression rose
The contestant received a rose during the date
The contestant was eliminated
The contestant was eliminated during the date
The contestant was eliminated outside the rose ceremony
The contestant quit the competition
The contestant won the competition

== Episodes (dates) ==
=== Week 1 ===
Original airdate: October 11, 2017

Bachelor Chris Leroux meets the bachelorettes. No dates occur this week.

First Impression Rose: Dee.

Rose Ceremony: Chelsea, Madelaine, Pricilla, Shaleen and Stephanie do not receive a rose and are eliminated.

=== Week 2 ===
Original airdate: October 18, 2017

One-on-one: Lyndsey. Chris takes Lyndsey on a plane ride over an active volcano in Costa Rica. Chris' fear of flying brings them closer together. They enjoy drinks in a treetop hut, where Chris expresses concern over the age difference between him and Lyndsey, but she convinces him that she's ready for love. They share the first kiss of the season and she receives a rose.

Group Date One: April, Brittany W., Catie, Lisa, Meghan, Mikaela. Each woman has the chance to pose with Chris for a Costa Rican beach photo shoot. That evening, they enjoy some poolside drinks, where each woman gets some one-on-one time with Chris. Catie receives the date rose.

Group Date Two: Ashley, Brittany M., Dee, Jessie, Kait, Lara, Shanti, Stacy. Due to the extreme Costa Rican heat, Chris decides to forego the beach sports day he had planned, and instead meets the ladies at their villa to enjoy some time with them. Shanti throws the other women under the bus to Chris. Later, Chris meets the group for some champagne and one-on-one time, and surprises them with a fire poi dancer. Chris asks Shanti to leave because she brings too much stress to him and the group. No date rose is given.

Cocktail Party: Chris cancels the cocktail party in favour of going directly into the rose ceremony.

Rose Ceremony: Ashley does not receive a rose and is eliminated.

=== Week 3 ===
Original airdate: October 25, 2017

Group Date One: Catie, Stacy, Meghan, Mikaela. Chris surprises the women with a trip to an eco adventure park. They go zip-lining, and Meghan faces her fear of heights. They finish the date with some champagne, where the women get some one-on-one time with Chris. Mikaela receives the date rose.

Group Date Two: April, Brittany M., Brittany W., Dee, Jessie, Lara, Lisa, Lyndsey. Chris takes the women to a fiesta at a local resort, where they participate in a variety of activities, including a mechanical bull riding competition. The top four longest riders are invited to share the evening with Chris and are each rewarded with some private time with him. Brittany M. receives the date rose.

One-on-one: Kait. Chris invites Kait to join him at the Parque Nacional Marino Las Baulas for a surfing adventure. Since Kait is a novice, Chris spends some time teaching her some surfing basics and helping her develop her skills. Afterward, they share some wine and deep conversation on the beach, focusing primarily on discussing their biggest fears. Kait receives a rose.

Cocktail Party: The remaining bachelorettes are all anxious to get one-on-one time with Chris at the cocktail party in order to make a deeper connection with him. When Mikaela decides to take some private time with Chris, the other women are upset because she already has a rose.

Rose Ceremony: April and Brittany W. do not receive a rose and are eliminated.

=== Week 4 ===
Original airdate: November 1, 2017

Group Date One: Brittany M., Jessie, Kait, Stacy. Chris changes up the tone of the group dates by hosting a relaxing, intimate pool party at his villa, where he hopes to get to know the ladies better. Brittany M's personality dominates the date, but the date rose goes to Jessie.

Group Date Two: Dee, Lara, Lisa, Lyndsey, Meghan, Mikaela. Chris plans a group date at a local school in Costa Rica, where they learn how to write a bomba, a traditional Latin American poem. The ladies are challenged to split into pairs to create their bombas and to then perform them in front of the entire school. Mikaela is declared the winner of the bomba competition, and gets some additional alone time with Chris. They play miniature golf, share some champagne and dancing, and Mikaela gets a rose.

One-on-one: Catie. Chris elects to play to Catie's strengths by inviting her on a sensual yoga date. Afterward, they share some time by the pool. Catie gets a rose.

Cocktail Party: Before the party, Dee is very anxious to get some time with Chris in order to figure out if she and Chris have a real connection. After she talks to Chris, they decide it would be best for her to go home and be with her daughter, so Chris sends Dee home before the Rose Ceremony begins.

Rose Ceremony: Lara does not receive a rose and is eliminated.

=== Week 5 ===
Original airdate: November 8, 2017

One-on-one: Brittany M. The group has moved to the Dominican Republic, so Chris plans an intimate helicopter ride so he and Brittany can check out their new surroundings from the air. Afterward, the pair spend some time poolside at a local resort to get to know each other a little better. Later, they dance the night away while watching the sun set. Brittany gets a rose.

Group Date One: Jessie, Kait, Meghan. The group meets up with Chris on a boat, and they head out on the ocean to go deep sea fishing. Meghan gets sea sick, so Jessie spends some time consoling her, giving Kait more alone time with Chris. Chris decides to cut the fishing expedition short to get Meghan back to shore, where he enjoys some champagne and one-on-one time with the ladies. Meghan gets the date rose.

Group Date Two: Catie, Lisa, Lyndsey, Mikaela, Stacy. The ladies meet Chris at a local baseball diamond, where he is in his element. He has planned for them to all play a game - and are joined by a local kids' team to help them fill out the team. The ladies get the opportunity to show Chris their enthusiasm for a big part of his life. Chris chooses Lyndsey as the MVP of the game, and sends the rest of the group back to their hotel to spend some alone time with Lyndsey. They again talk about the difficulties posed by their 10 year age difference, but ultimately Chris decides to give Lyndsey a rose.

Cocktail Party: Catie is particularly eager to get some time with Chris so they can tell him how they feel. Brittany M attracts some negative attention from the rest of the group by taking alone time with Chris when she already has a rose.

Rose Ceremony: Lisa does not receive a rose and is eliminated.

=== Week 6 ===
Original airdate: November 15, 2017

Group Date One: Brittany M., Jessie, Stacy, Meghan. The group meets Chris at a theatre in Puerto Plata, where they discover that they will be learning how to dance like Dominican showgirls and will later perform in front of a live audience. After the date, Meghan confronts Brittany M about a disrespectful off-camera conversation they had, and Brittany insists that Meghan misunderstood what she said. Chris intervenes to try to get to the bottom of the conflict, but Brittany M decides to leave the show and departs without saying goodbye to Chris.

One-on-one: Mikaela. Chris invites Mikaela to spend a casual day with him walking around Puerto Plata, where they sample rum and learn how to roll cigars. Later that evening, they have dinner at Fortaleza San Felipe and end the night by watching fireworks from the rooftop of the historic fortress. During the fireworks display, Mikaela tells Chris that she is falling in love with him. Mikaela gets a rose.

Group Date Two: Kait, Lyndsey, Catie. The ladies meet Chris at a local spa, where they are given various aphrodisiac ingredients and instructed to mix them into a "love potion" for Chris. Each woman receives one-on-one time to share their potion with Chris, where things get physical as they feed him aphrodisiacs and give him massages with their love potions. Chris is impressed by the new sensual side of Kait that he sees, and gives her the date rose.

Cocktail Party: During her time with Chris, Meghan re-visits her conflict with Brittany M, leaving him wishing that she could let it go and move forward. Catie's high energy during the cocktail party overwhelms Chris, and he asks her to try to calm down, fearing that she might be too intense for him.

Rose Ceremony: Meghan does not receive a rose and is eliminated.

=== Week 7 ===
Original airdate: November 22, 2017

One-on-one: Jessie. Chris takes Jessie on a catamaran trip, where she avoids most of the physical contact Chris tries to initiate with her. Later, during a sunset dinner at Playa Alicia, Chris expresses concern that Jessie is not as physically affectionate as he is, and she promises to be more affectionate moving forward. As this is the week before hometowns, no rose is handed out on the one-on-one date.

Group Date: Mikaela, Lyndsey, Stacy. The ladies meet Chris at the beach, where they compete in a sand sculpture competition. Chris chooses Stacy as the winner of the competition, and the two spend some alone time poolside. Chris expresses his hesitation to potentially meet Stacy's family since she has never brought anyone home before, but she reassures him. As this is the week before hometowns, no rose is handed out on the group date.

Two-on-one: Catie and Kait. Chris and the ladies take a cable-car ride up Mount Isabel de Torres. Once at the top, Chris spends time talking to each woman individually. Kait tells Chris that she is falling in love with him and hopes it is not too late. Catie promises Chris that she will be less intense, saying that his relaxed demeanor will help balance her out. Chris gives the two-on-one rose to Catie, and Kait is sent home.

Cocktail Party: Chris cancels the cocktail party in favour of going directly into the rose ceremony.

Rose Ceremony: Jessie and Stacy do not receive roses and are eliminated.

=== Week 8: Hometowns ===
Original airdate: November 29, 2017

Hometown Date One: Mikaela. Mikaela brings Chris to Winnipeg, and they start their date at the stables where Mikaela learned how to horseback ride when growing up. They have drinks beside the corral, and Mikaela admits that she has fallen in love with Chris. The pair then head to Mikaela's house, where Chris meets her father, step-father, mother, sister, and brother. Although Mikaela's family asks Chris some tough questions, they are happy with his answers and are accepting of him.

Hometown Date Two: Catie. Catie brings Chris to Toronto, where they meet in a downtown coffee shop and she confesses that she has fallen in love with him. Catie also tells him that she believes he is her soulmate - he matches a description she wrote of her ideal husband in an old journal, and a medium once predicted that her future husband's name would be Chris. Chris is unsettled both by the story and the fact that Catie is even more intense than usual. The two then go to Catie's house, where Chris meets her father, mother, brother, and sister-in-law, who immediately take a liking to Chris.

Hometown Date Three: Lyndsey. Lyndsey first brings Chris to meet her grandfather at his farm in Duncan, BC. They spend some time talking to her grandfather and then have a picnic, where Lyndsey tells Chris that she has fallen in love with him. Chris admits in a solo interview that he loves her too and that he is planning on asking her family for permission to marry her. The pair then head to Lyndsey's house on Lake Cowichan, where he meets her father, mother, and two sisters. Her family is immediately hostile to Chris, unsettled by the large age gap between him and Lyndsey and afraid that he will not move to the West Coast if they end up together. Due to the tension during the hometown, Chris does not ask Lyndsey's family for permission to marry her.

Rose Ceremony: Catie does not receive a rose and is eliminated.

=== Week 9: Finale Part 1 ===
Original airdate: December 6, 2017

Overnight Date One: Mikaela. Chris and Mikaela take a ride on a pirate ship in Cancun, Mexico. While on board, Mikaela tells Chris that she is ready for a proposal, but Chris seems unsure. Later, during an oceanfront dinner, Mikaela tells Chris that his confused behaviour earlier in the day made her question how secure their relationship is. Chris admits that he has not been as forthcoming with her as he should have been, and confesses that he is falling in love with her. The two dance to mariachi music on the beach before spending the night in the Fantasy Suite together.

Overnight Date Two: Lyndsey. Chris meets Lyndsey at a Mayan clay spa, where they give each other a mud treatment and participate in a Mayan purification ceremony. Later on, the pair spend time over drinks discussing Lyndsey's hometown date. Lyndsey admits that while her family may be an obstacle they will have to overcome, she will support him and they will face the challenge together. Chris tells Lyndsey that he would consider moving to the West Coast in order to be with her. The couple spend the night in the Fantasy Suite together.

Meeting the Parents: Both bachelorettes get a chance to meet Chris' parents at the villa they are staying at in Mexico. Mikaela goes first, and is well-received by both parents, with Chris' mother noting that Mikaela's communication skills would help Chris open up and be more comfortable expressing his feelings. Chris' parents express more hesitance upon meeting Lyndsey, due to the large age gap and the fact that Chris may move across the country to be with her. However, after getting a chance to talk to her, they agree that they would still be happy if she is the one Chris chooses.

=== Week 10: Women Tell All ===
Original airdate: December 13, 2017

Twelve of the twenty Bachelorettes meet up to discuss the season. Shanti and Brittany M are put in the hot seat as they respond to the conflict they had with other women while on the show, and Catie discusses the heartbreak of being sent home.

=== Week 11: Finale Part 2 ===
Original airdate: December 20, 2017

First One-on-one: Lyndsey. Chris and Lyndsey take a bike ride before spending time by the beach in Tulum. During their date, Chris admits to Lyndsey that after spending time with his parents last week, he realized how important being close to them is, and he is now less willing to move to the West Coast. This causes Lyndsey to begin to doubt the future of their relationship, since for her, living on the West Coast is non-negotiable.

Second One-on-one: Mikaela. Chris and Mikaela meet up for drinks poolside, where Mikaela expresses doubts in their relationship and concern about the strength of Chris' relationship with Lyndsey. Just as Chris begins to successfully reassure Mikaela that everything is fine and that their relationship is just as strong, he accidentally calls her Lyndsey, causing her to leave their date in tears.

Final Rose: Chris awaits the women on the beach in Tulum. Lyndsey arrives first and tells Chris she has realized that there are too many obstacles preventing their relationship from working. Chris agrees with her, and Lyndsey withdraws from the competition. Then Mikaela arrives, and Chris tells her that he loves her and wants to pursue their relationship outside of the show, but that he wants to get engaged on their own terms and is not ready to propose just yet. Mikaela agrees and accepts the final rose Chris offers her.

After the Final Rose: Lyndsey and Chris meet for the first time since their breakup to discuss what happened. Then Mikaela and Chris appear together publicly for the first time, admitting that while they are still in each other's lives, they are no longer together romantically.
