= Bachelor in Paradise (Canadian TV series) season 1 =

Bachelor in Paradise
- Season 1
- Promotional poster
- Starring: Jesse Jones; Kevin Wendt
- No. of episodes: 10

Release
- Original network: CityTv
- Original release: October 10 – December 12, 2021

Season chronology
- Next → Season 2

Season 1 of Bachelor in Paradise Canada premiered on October 10, 2021, on Citytv.

== Casting ==
On April 29, 2021, Jesse Jones was announced as the host of the inaugural season. Kevin Wendt, who previously starred on The Bachelorette Canada, The Bachelor Winter Games, and season 5 of Bachelor in Paradise was announced as the bartender on April 5, 2021.

The 26 contestants were announced on September 14, 2021. It features 12 alumni from the American and Canadian versions of the show. It also features 14 Canadian fans, who have never been featured on the show, from Bachelor Nation. Maria Garcia-Sanchez was a late addition to the cast, making the number of contestants 27.

== Contestants ==
Name	Age	Occupation	Residence	From	Arrived	Eliminated
Angela Amezcua	31	Model	Greenville, South Carolina	The Bachelor – Nick; Bachelor in Paradise – Season 5 & Season 6	Week 1	Relationship Week 5
Brendan Morgan	30	Yoga Instructor	Edmonton, Alberta	Bachelor Nation	Week 1	Relationship Week 5
Caitlin Clemmens	27	Real Estate Agent	Toronto, Ontario	The Bachelor – Colton; Bachelor in Paradise – Season 6	Week 1	Split Week 5
Kamil Nicalek	33	Real Estate Agent	Monroe, New York	The Bachelorette – Becca; Bachelor in Paradise – Season 5	Week 1	Split Week 5
Brendan Scanzano	26	Firefighter Trainee	Toronto, Ontario	The Bachelorette – Katie	Week 1	Split Week 5
Illeana Pennetto	26	Entrepreneur	South Salem, New York	The Bachelor – Matt	Week 1	Split Week 5
Josh Guvi	28	Filmmaker	Vancouver, British Columbia	Bachelor Nation	Week 2	Split Week 5
Maria Garcia-Sanchez	29	Designer	Toronto, Ontario / Cartagena, Colombia	Bachelor Nation	Week 3	Split Week 5
Alex Bordyukov	32	Information Systems Supervisor	Detroit, Michigan	The Bachelorette – Rachel; Bachelor in Paradise Australia – Season 2	Week 2	Split Week 5
Kit Blaiklock	27	Model	Vancouver, British Columbia	Bachelor Nation	Week 1	Split Week 5
Connor Rogers	27	Firefighter in Training	Toronto, Ontario	Bachelor Nation	Week 4	Split Week 5
Lisa Mancini	28	Cosplay Artist	St. Catharines, Ontario	The Bachelor Canada – Chris	Week 1	Split Week 5
Karn Karla	30	Actor	Toronto, Ontario	Bachelor Nation	Week 4	Week 4
Mike Ogilvie	34	Firefighter	Winnipeg, Manitoba	The Bachelorette Canada – Jasmine	Week 2	Split Week 4
Stacy Johnson	29	Interior Designer	Vancouver, British Columbia	The Bachelor Canada – Chris	Week 1	Split Week 4
Joey Kirchner	31	Model	Medicine Hat, Alberta	Bachelor Nation	Week 1	Relationship Week 4
Veronique "Vay" Paquette	31	Real Estate Agent	Sudbury, Ontario	Bachelor Nation	Week 1	Relationship Week 4
Bianka Kamber	37	Content Creator	Toronto, Ontario	The Bachelor Canada – Brad	Week 3	Week 3
Nicole Cregg	25	Flight Attendant	Toronto, Ontario	Bachelor Nation	Week 3	Week 3
Iva Mikulic	27	DJ	Calgary, Alberta	Bachelor Nation	Week 3	Week 3 (Quit)
Sasanet Iassu	26	Real Estate Student	Halifax, Nova Scotia	Bachelor Nation	Week 3	Week 3 (Quit)
Adam Kunder	28	Firefighter	Windsor, Ontario	Bachelor Nation	Week 2	Week 2
Chris Kotelmach	35	Inventor	Calgary, Alberta	The Bachelorette Canada – Jasmine	Week 1	Week 2
David Pinard	32	Actor/Musician	Toronto, Ontario	The Bachelorette Canada – Jasmine	Week 1	Week 2
Jeremy Lohier	28	Law Student	Montreal, Quebec	Bachelor Nation	Week 1	Week 2
Ana Cruz	26	Digital Content Creator	Montreal, Quebec	Bachelor Nation	Week 1	Week 1
Alice Li	27	Accountant	Toronto, Ontario	Bachelor Nation	Week 1	Week 1 (Quit)

=== Future appearances ===
==== Bachelor in Paradise Canada ====
Ana Cruz, Joey Kirchner, Josh Guvi, Lisa Mancini, and Maria Garcia-Sanchez returned for the second season. Guvi and Garcia-Sanchez quit week 3. Mancini and Cruz split from their partners, Connor Brennan and Juan Pablo Osorio, respectively, on week 6. Kirchner got engaged to Tessa Tookes on week 6.

== Elimination table ==
Place	Contestant	Week				
Place	Contestant	1	2	3	4	5
1-2	Angela	Brendan M.	Brendan M.	Brendan M.	Brendan M.	Relationship
1-2	Brendan M.	Angela	Angela	Angela	Angela	Relationship
3-4	Caitlin	Kamil	Kamil	Kamil	Kamil	Split
3-4	Kamil	Caitlin	Caitlin	Caitlin	Caitlin	Split
5-6	Brendan S.	Illeana	Illeana	Illeana	Illeana	Split
5-6	Illeana	Brendan S.	Brendan S.	Brendan S.	Brendan S.	Split
7-12	Josh	Wait	Lisa	Lisa	Maria	Split
7-12	Maria	Wait		Special Rose	Josh	Split
7-12	Alex	Wait	Kit	Kit	Kit	Split
7-12	Kit	Jeremy	Alex	Alex	Alex	Split
7-12	Connor	Wait			Lisa	Split
7-12	Lisa	David	Josh	Josh	Connor	Split
13	Karn	Wait			Out	
14-15	Mike	Wait	Stacy	Stacy	Split	
14-15	Stacy	Chris	Mike	Mike	Split	
16-17	Joey	Vay	Vay	Vay	Quit	
16-17	Vay	Joey	Joey	Joey	Quit	
18-19	Bianka	Wait		Out		
18-19	Nicole	Wait		Out		
20	Iva	Wait		Quit		
21	Sasanet	Wait		Quit		
22-25	Adam	Wait	Out			
22-25	Chris	Stacy	Out			
22-25	David	Lisa	Out			
22-25	Jeremy	Kit	Out			
26	Ana	Out				
27	Alice	Quit				

=== Key ===
The contestant is male
The contestant is female
Date The contestant went on a date and gave out a rose at the rose ceremony
Date The contestant went on a date and got a rose at the rose ceremony
In The contestant gave or received a rose at the rose ceremony, thus remaining in the competition
Last The contestant received the last rose
Last The contestant went on a date and received the last rose
Out The contestant went on a date and was eliminated
Out The contestant was eliminated
Quit The contestant had a date and voluntarily left the show
Quit The couple left together to pursue a relationship
Split The couple broke up and was eliminated
Split The couple had a date, then broke up and was eliminated
Stay The couple decided to stay together and won the competition
Wait The contestant had to wait before appearing in paradise

== Episodes ==
No. overall	No. in season	Title	Original release date
1	1	"Episode 1"	October 10, 2021
Arrivals: Brendan S., Illeana, Kamil, Lisa, Angela, Chris, Caitlin, Stacy, Brendan M., Jeremy, Ana, Kit, Joey, and Alice entered Camp Paradise. Vay is a late arrival. Vay's Date: Kamil After Paradise Canada Hosts: Daryn Jones and Deepa Prashad are joined by bartender Kevin Wendt and his fiancé Astrid Loch
2	2	"Episode 2"	October 17, 2021
Arrivals: David; David's Date: Alice; Departure: Alice After Paradise Canada Hosts: Jones and Prashad joined by Benoît Beauséjour-Savard and Kathleen Newman-Bremang
3	3	"Episode 3"	October 24, 2021
Rose Ceremony: Brendan M. gave his rose to Angela, Brendan S. gave his rose to Illeana, Chris gave his rose to Stacy, Jeremy gave his rose to Kit, Joey gave his rose to Vay, Kamil gave his rose to Caitlin, David gave his rose to Lisa. Ana did not receive a rose and was sent home. Arrivals: Alex, Mike, Josh; Alex's Date: Kit; Mike's Date: Stacy; Josh's Date: Angela After Paradise Canada Hosts: Jones and Prashad joined by Kristina Schulman and Queen Priyanka
4	4	"Episode 4"	October 31, 2021
Arrivals: Adam; Adam's Date: Illeana; Date Card: The group receives a date card that reads Joey gets to pick two campers to go on a date. He picks Adam and Illeana. After Paradise Canada Hosts: Jones and Prashad joined by Michael Yerxa and Sid Seixeiro
5	5	"Episode 5"	November 7, 2021
Rose Ceremony: Vay gave her rose to Joey, Angela gave her rose to Brendan M., Stacy gave her rose to Mike, Illeana gave her rose to Brendan S., Kit gave her rose to Alex, Lisa gave her rose to Josh, Caitlin gave her rose to Kamil. Adam, Chris, David, and Jeremy did not receive a rose and were sent home. Arrivals: Bianka, Nicole After Paradise Canada Hosts: Jones and Prashad joined by Kevin Wendt and Chelsea Vaughn
6	6	"Episode 6"	November 14, 2021
Arrivals: Sasanet, Iva, Maria; Sasanet's Date: Mike; Iva's Date: Josh; Maria's Date: Brendan M. After Paradise Canada Hosts: Jones and Prashad joined by Cabbie Richards and Aaron Clancy
7	7	"Episode 7"	November 21, 2021
Card: The group receives a card for a group talent show hosted by bartender Kevin and his fiancé Astrid. Brendan M. wins and gets to choose someone to bring on a one-on-one date. Brendan M.'s Date: Angela; Departure: Sasanet After Paradise Canada Hosts: Jones and Prashad joined by Donovan Bennett and Jasmine Lorimer
8	8	"Episode 8"	November 28, 2021
Departure: Iva; Rose Ceremony: Kamil gave his rose to Caitlin, Brendan S. gave his rose to Illeana, Brendan M. gave his rose to Angela, Alex gave his rose to Kit, Joey gave his rose to Vay, Mike gave his rose to Stacy, Josh gave his rose to Lisa. Host Jesse Jones gave a special rose out where the men get to decide who stays. Maria gets the rose and accepts. Bianka and Nicole did not receive a rose and were sent home. Arrivals: Connor, Karn; Connor's Date: Lisa; Karn's Date: Maria; Date Card: Kevin reads a date card that Joey gets to bring someone on a one-on-one date. Joey's Date: Vay; Departure: Joey & Vay left paradise as a couple. After Paradise Canada Hosts: Jones and Prashad joined by Devo Brown and Blake Moynes
9	9	"Episode 9"	December 5, 2021
Departure: Stacy & Mike broke up and left paradise Rose Ceremony: Angela gave her rose to Brendan M., Kit gave her rose to Alex, Lisa gave her rose to Connor, Caitlin gave her rose to Kamil, Illeana gave her rose to Brendan S., Maria gave her rose to Josh. Karn did not receive a rose and was sent home. Departure: Lisa & Connor, Kit & Alex, and Maria & Josh broke up and left paradise After Paradise Canada Hosts: Jones and Prashad joined by cast members Stacy Johnson and Lisa Mancini
10	10	"Episode 10"	December 12, 2021
Departure: Illeana & Brendan S. broke up and left paradise Commitment Ceremony #1: Caitlin & Kamil chose to break up Commitment Ceremony #2: Angela & Brendan M. chose to stay together Reunion: Joey & Vay reveal they broke up a few days after leaving paradise together and will not be getting back together in the future. Caitlin revealed she tried to get back with Kamil after paradise, but he officially ended things with her over text. They both shared they will not be getting back together in the future. Illeana & Brendan S. reveal they are currently not together, but are both open to a relationship in the future. Angela & Brendan M. reveal they are still together, moved to Toronto, and live together. Kevin Wendt announces there will be a second season. After Paradise Canada Hosts: Jones and Prashad joined by cast members Angela Amezcua, Brendan Morgan and Joey Kirchner
