= Bachelor in Paradise (Canadian TV series) season 2 =

Bachelor in Paradise
- Season 2
- Promotional poster
- Starring: Sharleen Joynt; Kevin Wendt
- No. of episodes: 10

Release
- Original network: CityTv
- Original release: May 8 – July 9, 2023

Season chronology
- ← Previous; Season 1

Season 2 of Bachelor in Paradise Canada premiered on May 8, 2023, on Citytv.

== Casting ==
On June 7, 2022, it was announced that Sharleen Joynt would be hosting this season, replacing Jesse Jones. Joynt starred on season 18 of The Bachelor. Kevin Wendt will also be returning as the bartender. The season will also feature guest appearances from Bachelor Nation stars Demi Burnett, Abigail Heringer, and Noah Erb, as well Canadian drag superstar The Queen Priyanka.

The 27 contestants were announced on March 20, 2023. It features 13 alumni from the US and Canada versions of the show, including 5 from season 1. It also features 14 Canadian fans, who have never been featured on the show, from Bachelor Nation.

The season also features three contestants who previously appeared on other reality show, Cole Medders previously competed on Heroes vs. Healers vs. Hustlers edition of Survivor, Godfrey Mangwiza and Sam Picco both previously appeared on Big Brother Canada. Mangwiza on season 3 where he finished as the runner-up, and Picco on season 7.

== Contestants ==
Name	Age	Occupation	Residence	From	Arrived	Eliminated
Joey Kirchner	32	Actor / Model	Redcliff, Alberta	Bachelor in Paradise Canada – Season 1	Week 1	Engaged Week 6
Tessa Tookes	27	HR Strategist	Brooklyn, New York	The Bachelor – Clayton	Week 3	Engaged Week 6
Austin Tinsley	26	Real Estate Agent / Personal Trainer	Orange County, California	The Bachelorette – Katie	Week 1	Relationship Week 6
Chelsea Vaughn	29	Model / Content Creator	Brooklyn, New York	The Bachelor – Matt; Bachelor in Paradise – Season 7	Week 1	Relationship Week 6
Garrett Aida	34	Tech CEO	Salt Lake City, Utah	The Bachelorette – Michelle	Week 1	Relationship Week 6
Meagan Morris	28	Interior Designer / Actor	Vancouver, British Columbia	Bachelor Nation	Week 1	Relationship Week 6
Ana Cruz	27	Talent Agent	Montreal, Quebec	Bachelor in Paradise Canada – Season 1	Week 3	Split Week 6
Juan Pablo Osorio	32	Fitness Coach	Toronto, Ontario	Bachelor Nation	Week 4	Split Week 6
Céline Paquette	25	Flight Attendant	Winnipeg, Manitoba	Bachelor Nation	Week 1	Relationship Week 6
Matia Marcantuoni	28	Fitness Coach	Toronto, Ontario / Miami, Florida	Bachelor Nation	Week 1	Relationship Week 6
Connor Brennan	30	Musician	Nashville, Tennessee	The Bachelorette – Katie; Bachelor in Paradise – Season 7	Week 1	Split Week 6
Lisa Mancini	29	Cosplay Artist	St. Catharines, Ontario	The Bachelor Canada – Chris; Bachelor in Paradise Canada – Season 1	Week 1	Split Week 6
Marilyn Smith	26	Executive Assistant	Toronto, Ontario	Bachelor Nation	Week 5	Week 5 (Quit)
Sam Picco	33	Entrepreneur	St. John's, Newfoundland and Labrador	Bachelor Nation	Week 1	Week 5 (Quit)
Krissy Kennedy	27	Model	Vancouver, British Columbia	Bachelor Nation	Week 5	Week 5 (Quit)
Cole Medders	29	Adventure Guide	Los Angeles, California	Bachelor Nation	Week 1	Week 5 (Quit)
Edward Naranjo	28	Fitness Coach	Los Angeles, California	The Bachelorette – Michelle	Week 2	Week 4
Josh Guvi	29	Filmmaker	Vancouver, British Columbia	Bachelor in Paradise Canada – Season 1	Week 3	Week 4 (Quit)
Maria Garcia-Sanchez	30	Designer	Toronto, Ontario / Cartagena, Colombia	Bachelor in Paradise Canada – Season 1	Week 1	Week 4 (Quit)
Nithisha Ketheeswaran	26	Insurance Company Manager	Stouffville, Ontario	Bachelor Nation	Week 1	Week 3
Paige Allen	31	Director of Talent Acquisition	Toronto, Ontario	Bachelor Nation	Week 3	Week 3
Godfrey Mangwiza	29	Boxing Trainer	Toronto, Ontario	Bachelor Nation	Week 2	Week 2
Jake Ondrus	22	Holistic Nutritionist	Toronto, Ontario	Bachelor Nation	Week 2	Week 2
Quartney Mixon	28	Supplement Brand Owner	Dallas, Texas	The Bachelorette – Katie	Week 1	Week 2 (Quit)
Linda Charlie	23	Construction Worker / Model	Yellowknife, Northwest Territories	Bachelor Nation	Week 1	Week 1
Rianna Hockaday	27	Registered Nurse	Mount Pleasant, Texas	The Bachelor – Clayton	Week 1	Week 1
Shaz Gafoor	24	Yoga Instructor / Model	Toronto, Ontario	Bachelor Nation	Week 1	Week 1

=== Future appearances ===
==== Love Island USA ====
Matia Marcantuoni appeared as a Casa Amor bombshell on season 5 of Love Island USA. He was dumped on day 27 after failing to couple up.

==== Bachelor in Paradise USA ====
Sam Picco returned for season 9 of the U.S. version of Bachelor in Paradise. She split from her partner Peter Cappio week 5.

== Elimination table ==
Place	Contestant	Week					
Place	Contestant	1	2	3	4	5	6
1-6	Joey	Céline	Céline	Tessa	Tessa	Tessa	Engaged
1-6	Tessa	Wait		Joey	Joey	Joey	Engaged
1-6	Austin	Chelsea	Chelsea	Chelsea	Chelsea	Chelsea	Relationship
1-6	Chelsea	Austin	Austin	Austin	Austin	Austin	Relationship
1-6	Garrett	Nithisha	Meagan	Meagan	Meagan	Meagan	Relationship
1-6	Meagan	Matia	Garrett	Garrett	Garrett	Garrett	Relationship
7-8	Ana	Wait		Edward	Juan	Juan	Split
7-8	Juan	Wait			Ana	Ana	Split
9-10	Céline	Joey	Joey	Matia	Matia	Matia	Quit
9-10	Matia	Meagan	Maria	Céline	Céline	Céline	Quit
11-12	Connor	Maria	Lisa	Lisa	Lisa	Lisa	Split
11-12	Lisa	Quartney	Connor	Connor	Connor	Connor	Split
13-14	Marilyn	Wait				Quit	
13-14	Sam	Cole	Cole	Cole	Cole	Quit	
15	Krissy	Wait				Quit	
16	Cole	Sam	Sam	Sam	Sam	Quit	
17	Edward	Wait	Nithisha	Ana	Out		
18	Josh	Wait		Maria	Quit		
19	Maria	Connor	Matia	Josh	Quit		
20-21	Nithisha	Garrett	Edward	Out			
20-21	Paige	Wait		Out			
22-24	Godfrey	Wait	Out				
22-24	Jake	Wait	Out				
22-24	Quartney	Lisa	Quit				
25-27	Linda	Out					
25-27	Rianna	Out					
25-27	Shaz	Out					

=== Key ===
The contestant is male
The contestant is female
Date The contestant went on a date and gave out a rose at the rose ceremony
Date The contestant went on a date and got a rose at the rose ceremony
Date The contestant had a date and moved on to the next week by default
In The contestant gave or received a rose at the rose ceremony, thus remaining in the competition
In The contestant moved on to the next week by default
Last The contestant received the last rose
Last The contestant went on a date and received the last rose
Wait The contestant had to wait before appearing in paradise
Out The contestant went on a date and was eliminated
Out The contestant was eliminated
Quit The contestant had a date and voluntarily left the show
Quit The contestant voluntarily left the show
Quit The couple left together to pursue a relationship
Split The couple broke up and was eliminated
Stay The couple decided to stay together and won the competition

== Episodes ==
No. overall	No. in season	Title	Original release date
11	1	"Episode 1"	May 8, 2023
Arrivals: Lisa, Austin, Rianna, Matia, Chelsea, Sam, Quartney, Céline, Garrett, Nithisha, Cole, Linda, Shaz, Meagan, Maria, Connor. Joey was a late arrival. Date Card: Lisa; Lisa's Date: Quartney; Date Card: Joey; Joey's Date: Shaz; Demi Burnett arrives in a guest appearance with a date card.
12	2	"Episode 2"	May 15, 2023
Burnett's date card is revealed to be an invitation to a bonfire. Rose Ceremony: Austin gave his rose to Chelsea, Matia gave his rose to Meagan, Garrett gave his rose to Nithisha, Quartney gave his rose to Lisa, Connor gave his rose to Maria, Cole gave his rose to Sam, Joey gave his rose to Céline. Linda, Rianna, and Shaz did not receive a rose and were sent home. Arrivals: Edward, Godfrey; Edward's Date: Nithisha; Godfrey's Date: Lisa
13	3	"Episode 3"	May 22, 2023
Arrival: Jake; Jake's Date: Sam; Date Card: Everyone has to compete in a competition where the winning couple gets to go on a date Date: Joey and Céline
14	4	"Episode 4"	May 29, 2023
Departure: Quartney; Rose Ceremony: Céline gave her rose to Joey, Chelsea gave her rose to Austin, Meagan gave her rose to Garrett, Sam gave her rose to Cole, Maria gave her rose to Matia, Lisa gave her rose to Connor, Nithisha gave her rose to Edward. Jake and Godfrey did not receive a rose and were sent home. Arrivals: Paige, Ana; Paige's Date: Connor; Ana's Date: Edward
15	5	"Episode 5"	June 5, 2023
Arrival: Tessa; Tessa's Date: Joey
16	6	"Episode 6"	June 12, 2023
Arrival: Josh; Josh's Date: Chelsea; Rose Ceremony: Joey gave his rose to Tessa, Garrett gave his rose to Meagan, Edward gave his rose to Ana, Cole gave his rose to Sam, Austin gave his rose to Chelsea, Matia gave his rose to Céline, Connor gave his rose to Lisa, Josh gave his rose to Maria. Nithisha and Paige did not receive a rose and were sent home.
17	7	"Episode 7"	June 19, 2023
Date Card: Sam; Sam's Date: Cole; Arrival: Juan; Juan's Date: Ana
18	8	"Episode 8"	June 25, 2023
Queen Priyanka hosts a roast, along with Kevin and Sharleen. The MVP of the roast gets a date card. Roast MVP: Chelsea; Chelsea's Date: Austin; Rose Ceremony: Chelsea gave her rose to Austin, Tessa gave her rose to Joey, Meagan gave her rose to Garrett, Sam gave her rose to Cole, Céline gave her rose to Matia, Lisa gave her rose to Connor, Maria gave up her rose and quit, causing Josh to quit as well. Ana gave her rose to Juan. Edward did not receive a rose and was sent home. Departure: Maria & Josh
19	9	"Episode 9"	July 2, 2023
Arrivals: Marilyn, Krissy; Marilyn's Date: Connor; Krissy's Date: Matia; Departure: Céline; Date Card: Meagan; Meagan's Date: Garrett; Departure: Cole. Matia quit to try and pursue a relationship with Céline. He is saying goodbye to everyone at the end of the episode when someone comes to Paradise, but they remain unknown until the next episode.
20	10	"Episode 10"	July 9, 2023
Arrival: Céline returns to Paradise and Matia decides to stay for her. Departure: Krissy, Marilyn, Sam. With an even amount of men and women left, the rose ceremony was cancelled and the 6 remaining couples automatically moved on to week 6. Noah Erb & Abigail Heringer arrive to have a casino night and talk to the remaining couples. Departure: Connor & Lisa broke up. Matia & Céline left as a couple. Juan & Ana broke up. Commitment Ceremony #1: Garrett & Meagan chose to leave in a relationship. Commitment Ceremony #2: Austin & Chelsea chose to leave in a relationship. Commitment Ceremony #3: Tessa proposed to Joey with a string ring before he proposed to her. After Filming: Joey & Tessa revealed on an Instagram live that they are still engaged, moved to Toronto and got a dog together. They are planning their wedding for fall 2024. Austin & Chelsea are still together and moved in together. Garrett & Meagan broke up sometime after filming ended, and Meagan is currently in another relationship. Matia & Céline also broke up with Céline in another relationship as well.
