= Alan Ball (American football) =

American football player (born 1985)

No. 20, 22, 23, 24
- Position: Cornerback

Personal information
- Born: March 29, 1985 (age 41); Detroit, Michigan, U.S.
- Listed height: 6 ft 2 in (1.88 m)
- Listed weight: 195 lb (88 kg)

Career information
- High school: St. Martin de Porres (Detroit)
- College: Illinois
- NFL draft: 2007: 7th round, 237th overall pick

Career history
- Dallas Cowboys (2007–2011); Houston Texans (2012); Jacksonville Jaguars (2013–2014); Chicago Bears (2015); Arizona Cardinals (2016)*
- * Offseason or practice squad member only

Career NFL statistics
- Total tackles: 234
- Sacks: 0.5
- Forced fumbles: 2
- Pass deflections: 37
- Interceptions: 6
- Stats at Pro Football Reference

Alan Sheffield Ball (born March 29, 1985) is an American former professional football player who was a cornerback in the National Football League (NFL) for the Dallas Cowboys, Houston Texans, Jacksonville Jaguars, and Chicago Bears. He was selected by the Cowboys in the seventh round of the 2007 NFL draft. He played college football for the Illinois Fighting Illini. He was a contestant on the 35th season of Survivor (Heroes v. Healers v. Hustlers), where he placed 15th.

== Early life ==
Ball attended Saint Martin de Porres High School in Detroit, Michigan. As a senior, he helped his team win the 2001 state championship in football, by making 15 interceptions 6 in the postseason). He received All-region honors.

Also a standout track & field athlete, he received All-State honors after winning back-to-back 110-meter hurdles state titles as a junior and senior.

== College career ==
Ball accepted a football scholarship from the University of Illinois at Urbana–Champaign. As a redshirt freshman, he appeared in 7 games with 5 starts, making 44 tackles, 4 passes defensed and one forced fumble. He had 11 tackles against the University of Iowa.

He doubled his starts (10) as a sophomore, finishing with 37 tackles (one for loss) and one pass defensed. He had 8 tackles against UCLA and Western Michigan University.

As a junior, he appeared in all 11 games and started the final 7 contests. He registered 55 tackles (fourth on the team), one interception, 5 passes defensed (led the team) and 4 tackles for loss. He had 10 tackles (2 for loss) against the University of Wisconsin. He made 9 tackles (one for loss) against Northwestern University.

His best season came as a senior, when he received honorable-mention All-Big Ten honors, after recording 62 tackles (3 for loss), one interception, and 13 passes defensed (fifth in school history). He finished his college career with 199 tackles (8 for loss), 2 interceptions, 23 passes defensed (tied for eighth in school history), and one forced fumble.

== Professional career ==
=== Dallas Cowboys ===
Ball was selected by the Dallas Cowboys in the seventh round (237th overall) of the 2007 NFL draft. He was waived on September 2 and spent the first 14 games of the season on the practice squad, before being promoted to the active roster on December 11. He made his NFL debut on December 22, against the Carolina Panthers.

In 2008, he appeared in 10 games, playing mainly on special teams. He missed the final two games with an ankle injury. He posted 4 defensive tackles, 5 special teams tackles and one pass defensed.

In 2009, he was third on the team with 16 special teams tackles. He made an appearance in all 16 games (during the 2009 season) for first time in his career, along with the first three starts of his career, collecting 18 tackles and three pass break-ups.

In 2010, with the changes that the NFL was experiencing in the passing game, head coach Wade Phillips thought he could develop into an effective free safety and switched him from his previous cornerback position. He replaced Ken Hamlin and started 16 games, registering 50 tackles, a half sack, two interceptions, five passes defensed, one special teams tackle and two forced fumbles. Ball started all 16 contests for first time in his career.

In 2011, he lost his starter job to Abram Elam and returned to a backup cornerback role, registering 32 tackles, one interception, six passes defensed and 5 special teams tackles. He wasn't re-signed at the end of the season.

=== Houston Texans ===
On June 2, 2012, Ball was signed by the Houston Texans, reuniting with former Cowboys head coach Wade Phillips. He played in 11 games with one start at cornerback. Ball was declared inactive in the last five games with a foot injury. He finished second on the team with 13 special teams tackles. Ball also had seven defensive tackles and three passes defensed. He was not re-signed at the end of the season.

=== Jacksonville Jaguars ===
On March 15, 2013, Ball signed as a free agent by the Jacksonville Jaguars. He was named the starter at right cornerback (15 starts), finishing with career-highs in passes defensed (14), tackles (47) and interceptions (two). The 14 passes defensed were the most by a Jaguars player since Rashean Mathis' 21 in 2006.

In 2014, he started the first seven games, before sustaining a biceps injury against the Cleveland Browns and being placed on the injured reserve list on October 28. He registered 22 tackles (one for loss), one interception, and three passes defensed.

=== Chicago Bears ===
On March 27, 2015, Ball signed with the Chicago Bears on a one-year deal. He struggled with a foot injury in training camp, but still was able to begin the regular season as a starter, losing his job to Tracy Porter in the fourth game, who went on to start the rest of the year. Ball played primarily in dime packages, ending the year with 20 tackles and five pass breakups.

=== Arizona Cardinals ===
On August 4, 2016, Ball signed as a free agent with the Arizona Cardinals. He suffered a quadriceps injury a few days after signing. On August 30, he was released with an injury settlement.

== NFL career statistics ==
Legend
**Bold**	Career high

=== Regular season ===
Year	Team	Games		Tackles					Interceptions					Fumbles			
Year	Team	GP	GS	Cmb	Solo	Ast	Sck	TFL	Int	Yds	TD	Lng	PD	FF	FR	Yds	TD
2007	DAL	2	0	3	3	0	0.0	0	0	0	0	0	0	0	0	0	0
2008	DAL	10	0	9	4	5	0.0	0	0	0	0	0	1	0	0	0	0
2009	DAL	**16**	3	31	26	5	0.0	0	0	0	0	0	3	0	0	0	0
2010	DAL	**16**	**16**	46	**41**	5	**0.5**	0	**2**	**27**	0	**27**	4	**1**	0	0	0
2011	DAL	**16**	2	37	30	**7**	0.0	**1**	1	15	0	15	6	0	**1**	0	0
2012	HOU	11	1	21	18	3	0.0	0	0	0	0	0	3	**1**	0	0	0
2013	JAX	15	15	**47**	**41**	6	0.0	0	**2**	8	0	8	**14**	0	0	0	0
2014	JAX	7	7	22	18	4	0.0	**1**	1	0	0	0	3	0	0	0	0
2015	CHI	15	3	18	13	5	0.0	0	0	0	0	0	3	0	0	0	0
		108	47	234	194	40	0.5	2	6	50	0	27	37	2	1	0	0

=== Playoffs ===
Year	Team	Games		Tackles					Interceptions					Fumbles			
Year	Team	GP	GS	Cmb	Solo	Ast	Sck	TFL	Int	Yds	TD	Lng	PD	FF	FR	Yds	TD
2009	DAL	**2**	0	3	3	0	0.0	0	0	0	0	0	0	0	0	0	0
2012	HOU	**2**	0	**5**	**5**	0	0.0	0	0	0	0	0	0	0	0	0	0
		4	0	8	8	0	0.0	0	0	0	0	0	0	0	0	0	0

== Survivor: Heroes vs. Healers vs. Hustlers ==
On August 30, 2017, CBS announced that Ball would be included in the cast of season 35 of Survivor. He was initially placed on Levu (the Heroes tribe). After losing the first immunity challenge, Levu went to Tribal Council, where Ball caused trouble with fellow players JP Hilsabeck and Ashley Nolan, whom he saw as a power couple. At the tribal switch on Day Nine, he remained on the same tribe as Nolan, and they were forced to work together, to try to vote out Joe Mena of the former Soko (Healers) tribe. However, Mena had an idol, which he used to cancel the votes against him, thus sending Ball home. He was the fourth person voted out of the game, placing 15th.
