= The Bachelorette Canada =

- Promotional poster
- Genre: Reality competition
- Written by: Keely Booth
- Directed by: Michael Margolis
- Presented by: Noah Cappe
- Country of origin: Canada
- Original language: English
- No. of seasons: 1
- No. of episodes: 10

Production
- Executive producer: Claire Freeland
- Production company: Good Human Productions Inc.

Original release
- Network: W Network
- Release: September 13 – November 22, 2016

Related
- The Bachelor Canada; The Bachelor (American TV series); The Bachelor (British TV series)

The Bachelorette Canada is a Canadian reality television dating game show based on the American series of the same name. The series is produced by Good Human Productions Inc. and airs on the women's specialty channel W Network.

== Season 1 ==
The season premiered on September 13, 2016. This season features 28-year-old Jasmine Lorimer, a hairstylist and from Kenora, Ontario. Despite getting engaged during the finale, Wendt and Lorimer announced in April 2017, 11 months after their engagement (5 months after it aired for viewers), that they had amicably parted ways.

=== Contestants ===
The contestants were announced on August 9, 2016.

Biographical information according to W Network's official series site, plus footnoted additions.

Name	Age	Hometown	Job	Eliminated
Kevin Wendt	32	Waterloo, Ontario	Ex-Navy/Firefighter	Winner
Mikhel Sickand	28	Ottawa, Ontario	Aviation Engineer	Runner-Up
Mike Ogilvie	29	Winnipeg, Manitoba	Firefighter Paramedic	Episode 8
Benoit Beauséjour-Savard	29	Montreal, Quebec	Restaurant Manager	Episode 7
Kevin Pattee	35	Vancouver, British Columbia	Deckhand	Episode 7
Drew Classen	32	Toronto, Ontario	VP, Medical Sales	Episode 6
Thomas Perass	30	Regina, Saskatchewan	International model	Episode 6
Chris Kotelmach	30	Calgary, Alberta	Inventor	Episode 5
Andrew Rosen	29	Toronto, Ontario	Management Consultant	Episode 4
David Pinard	26	Windsor, Ontario	Musician	Episode 4
Kyle Andrew Skinner	36	Hamilton, Ontario	Multimedia Producer	Episode 4
JP Fok	27	Whistler, British Columbia	Butler in the Buff	Episode 3
Scott Kolotylo	27	Winnipeg, Manitoba	Carpenter	Episode 3
Seth Oshea	25	Edmonton, Alberta	Bartender	Episode 2
Wale Dauda-Tijani	28	Winnipeg, Manitoba	Occupational Therapist	Episode 2
Dana	30	Gatineau, Quebec	Disaster Search and Rescue	Episode 1
Eddie	32	Saint John, New Brunswick	Oilfield Logistics Coordinator	Episode 1
Ross	31	Halifax, Nova Scotia	Welder	Episode 1
Taylor	31	Collingwood, Ontario	Oilfield Equipment Operator	Episode 1
Tony Williams	27	Calgary, Alberta	Cowboy	Episode 1

=== Future appearances ===
==== The Bachelor Winter Games ====
Benoit Beauséjour-Savard and Kevin Wendt were chosen to compete at The Bachelor Winter Games as Team Canada. Beauséjour-Savard quit episode 2. Wendt and his partner, Ashley Iaconetti won and were in a relationship.

==== Bachelor in Paradise ====
Beauséjour-Savard and Wendt both later returned to compete on the fifth season of Bachelor in Paradise. Beauséjour-Savard was eliminated week 3. Wendt split from Astrid Loch week 6, although they got back together after filming wrapped.

==== Bachelor in Paradise Canada ====
Mike Ogilvie, Chris Kotelmach and David Pinard later competed in the inaugural season of Bachelor in Paradise Canada. Kotelmach and Pinard were eliminated week 2. Ogilvie split from Stacy Johnson week 4. Wendt also returned as the bartender for the show.

=== Call-out order ===
#	Bachelors	Episodes								
#	Bachelors	1	2	3	4	5	6	7	8	10
1	Kevin W.	Mike	Thomas	Kevin W.	Mikhel	Mike	Benoit	Mikhel	Mikhel	Kevin W.
2	Wale	Kevin W.	Kevin P.	Drew	Benoit	Thomas	Mike	Kevin W.	Kevin W.	Mikhel
3	David	Drew	Kevin W.	Kevin P.	Mike	Drew	Mikhel	Mike	Mike	
4	Drew	Thomas	Mikhel	Andrew	Kevin W.	Mikhel	Kevin P.	Benoit; Kevin P.		
5	Benoit	Mikhel	Benoit	Mike	Thomas	Kevin W.	Kevin W.	Benoit; Kevin P.		
6	Mike	Kyle	Kyle	Kyle	Kevin P.	Benoit	Drew; Thomas			
7	Andrew	Seth	Andrew	Mikhel	Chris	Kevin P.	Drew; Thomas			
8	Taylor	Scott	David	Chris	Drew	Chris				
9	Kyle	Andrew	Drew	Thomas	Andrew; David; Kyle					
10	Kevin P.	Chris	JP	David	Andrew; David; Kyle					
11	Chris	Benoit	Scott	Benoit	Andrew; David; Kyle					
12	Dana	Wale	Mike	JP; Scott						
13	Tony	Kevin P.	Chris	JP; Scott						
14	Eddie	JP	Seth; Wale							
15	Scott	David	Seth; Wale							
16	Seth	Dana; Eddie; Ross; Taylor; Tony								
17	Mikhel	Dana; Eddie; Ross; Taylor; Tony								
18	Ross	Dana; Eddie; Ross; Taylor; Tony								
19	Thomas	Dana; Eddie; Ross; Taylor; Tony								
20	JP	Dana; Eddie; Ross; Taylor; Tony								

The contestant received a first impression rose
The contestant received a rose during the date
The contestant was eliminated
The contestant won the competition

=== Episodes (dates) ===
==== Week 1 ====
Original airdate: September 13, 2016

==== Week 2 ====
Original airdate: September 20, 2016

- Located in: Jamaica

One-on-one: Thomas. They take turns driving an ATV to a beach where they have dinner and Thomas talks about how he became a model. Thomas gets the rose.

Group Date: Chris, Benoit, Kevin P, Scott, Seth, Mike, Kyle and Drew. The men go to Tuff Gong studio where they divide into groups of two. Then they must write and perform their original songs to Jasmine. Group 1: Drew, Mike, Benoit, Scott. Group 2: Chris, Seth, Kevin P, Kyle. Group 2 wins and get more time with Jasmine while group 1 goes home. Kevin P gets the rose.

Second Group Date: Andrew, Mikhel, J.P, Wale and Kevin W. The men battle in wrestling matches and J.P is crowned the winner. Afterwards, Jasmine and the men head to a blue hole. Kevin W receives the rose.

David is the only one this week to not get a date. At the cock tail party, Jasmine confronts Seth about their awkward kiss and they question their compatibility. He asks for a second chance.

Rose Ceremony: Wale and Seth are eliminated, with Seth telling Jasmine they had no chemistry upon exit.
