= Bachelor in Paradise Canada =

- Genre: Reality competition
- Presented by: Jesse Jones; Sharleen Joynt
- Opening theme: "We're Here for a Good Time (Not a Long Time)" by Trooper
- Country of origin: Canada
- Original language: English
- No. of seasons: 2
- No. of episodes: 20

Production
- Production location: Ontario
- Running time: 64-86 minutes

Original release
- Network: CityTv
- Release: October 10, 2021 – July 9, 2023

Related
- The Bachelor; The Bachelorette; Bachelor in Paradise; The Bachelor Canada; The Bachelorette Canada

Bachelor in Paradise Canada is a Canadian reality competition television series, which premiered on October 10, 2021, on Citytv. It is a spin-off of the American reality television shows Bachelor in Paradise, The Bachelor, The Bachelorette, and Canadian reality television shows The Bachelor Canada and The Bachelorette Canada. It was originally hosted by Jesse Jones. For season 2, Sharleen Joynt, who starred on season 18 of The Bachelor, became the host.

== Production ==
=== Development and filming ===
Rejected contestants from past American and Canadian seasons of The Bachelor and The Bachelorette are isolated together at "Camp Paradise." It also features contestants who have never been featured on any show. Kevin Wendt from The Bachelorette Canada, The Bachelor Winter Games, and season 5 of Bachelor in Paradise is serving as the bartender.

Camp Paradise was filmed in 2021 through the month of June at a secluded area off of the lakeside, Camp Wahanowin in Orillia off Lake Couchiching, during season 1. The show was renewed for a second season, which premiered on May 8, 2023. It was filmed in 2022 through the month of June at Christie's Mill Inn and Spa and the Muskoka Lakes shorelines in Port Severn, Ontario.

On June 6, 2023, it was revealed that the show would not return for a third season in 2024.

== After Paradise ==
After the show aired during the first season, The Bachelor After Show: After Paradise Canada aired. It was hosted by Daryn Jones and Deepa Prashad. Members of Bachelor Nation or Canadian television joined them each week to recap the recently aired episode.

== Series overview ==
Season	Episodes	Originally released	
Season	Episodes	First released	Last released
1	10	October 10, 2021	December 12, 2021
2	10	May 8, 2023	July 9, 2023

== Season summary ==
Season	Original Run	Couples	Proposal	Still together?	Relationship notes
1	October 10 – December 12, 2021	Brendan Morgan & Angela Amezcua	No	No	Morgan and Amezcua left in a relationship and moved to Toronto together. They broke up in April 2022.
1	October 10 – December 12, 2021	Joey Kirchner & Veronique "Vay" Paquette	No	No	Kirchner and Paquette left together as a couple after their date in week 4. During the finale, it was revealed they broke up a few days after leaving Paradise.
2	May 8 – July 9, 2023	Joey Kirchner & Tessa Tookes	Yes	Yes	Tookes proposed to Kirchner before Kirchner proposed to her. They revealed on an Instagram live they moved to Toronto together, and the couple later moved to New York City together. They married on September 21, 2024.
2	May 8 – July 9, 2023	Austin Tinsley & Chelsea Vaughn	No	No	Tinsley and Vaughn left in a relationship and moved in together in February 2023. They announced their split on September 27, 2023.
2	May 8 – July 9, 2023	Garrett Aida & Meagan Morris	No	No	Aida and Morris left in a relationship, but broke up shortly after leaving Paradise due to distance.
2	May 8 – July 9, 2023	Matia Marcantuoni & Céline Paquette	No	No	Marcantuoni and Paquette left in a relationship before the commitment ceremony, but Paquette revealed they broke up shortly after leaving Paradise, but remain friends.
