= Chris Leroux =

Canadian baseball player (born 1984)

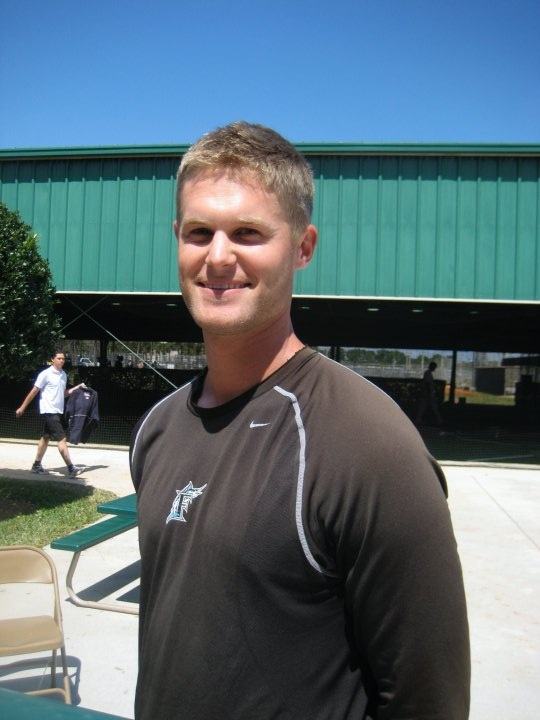
- Leroux at Florida Marlins training camp 2010
- Pitcher
- Born: April 14, 1984 (age 41); Montreal, Quebec, Canada
- Batted: Left Threw: Right

Professional debut
- MLB: May 26, 2009, for the Florida Marlins
- NPB: June 2, 2013, for the Tokyo Yakult Swallows

Last appearance
- NPB: August 11, 2013, for the Tokyo Yakult Swallows
- MLB: May 2, 2014, for the New York Yankees

MLB statistics
- Win–loss record: 1–3
- Earned run average: 6.03
- Strikeouts: 66

NPB statistics
- Win–loss record: 0–2
- Earned run average: 9.00
- Strikeouts: 14
- Stats at Baseball Reference

Teams
- Florida Marlins (2009–2010); Pittsburgh Pirates (2010–2013); Tokyo Yakult Swallows (2013); New York Yankees (2014)
Medals
Men's baseball
Representing Canada
Pan American Games
Gold medal – first place	2015 Toronto	Team
Silver medal – second place	2019 Lima	Team

Christopher Adam Leroux (born April 14, 1984) is a Canadian former professional baseball pitcher and television personality. He played for the Florida Marlins, Pittsburgh Pirates, and New York Yankees in Major League Baseball (MLB) and for the Tokyo Yakult Swallows of Nippon Professional Baseball (NPB). Leroux also competed for the Canadian national baseball team in international competitions.

== Career ==
=== Amateur career ===
Leroux attended St. Joseph Secondary School in Mississauga, Ontario. The Tampa Bay Devil Rays selected Leroux in the ninth round in the 2002 MLB draft, but he did not sign. He attended Winthrop University, where he played college baseball for the Winthrop Eagles baseball team. He also played collegiate summer baseball for the Falmouth Commodores of the Cape Cod League in 2004.

=== Professional career ===
==== Minor leagues ====
The Florida Marlins selected Leroux in the seventh round of the 2005 MLB draft, and he signed. In 2006, Leroux was assigned to the Greensboro Grasshoppers of the Class A South Atlantic League, where he made three starts before being injured. After a rehab assignment with the Gulf Coast Marlins of the Rookie-level Gulf Coast League, he was assigned to the Jamestown Jammers of the Class A-Short Season New York-Penn League. In 11 total starts, he went 0-4 with a 6.06 earned run average (ERA), striking out 22 in 32 2/3 innings pitched. Leroux played 2007 with Greensboro, where in 46 appearances, he went 2-3 with a 4.14 ERA, striking out 76 in 71 2/3 innings.

Leroux played 2008 with the Jupiter Hammerheads of the Class A-Advanced Florida State League, where in 57 games, he went 6-7 with a 3.65 ERA and one save, striking out 78 in 74 innings. Leroux began 2009 with the Jacksonville Suns of the Class AA Southern League, where he played until he was promoted to the major leagues by the Marlins. He had a few stints with Florida, but spent most of his time in Jacksonville, where in 46 games, he went 5-3 with a 2.70 ERA and two saves, striking out 55 in 60 innings.

==== Florida Marlins ====
On May 23, 2009, Leroux was recalled by the Marlins. He made his MLB debut three days later against the Philadelphia Phillies. He was optioned the next day when Brett Carroll was recalled. He rejoined the Marlins when Matt Lindstrom went on the disabled list. In his third appearance, he recorded his first MLB strikeout, which was of Cristian Guzmán. In 5 games with the Marlins, he had a 10.80 ERA with two strikeouts in 6 2/3 innings.

Leroux opened 2010 with the New Orleans Zephyrs of the Class AAA Pacific Coast League (PCL), but was recalled on April 14. Leroux was placed on the 15-day disabled list on May 19 with a right elbow strain. He missed 26 games, and was subsequently assigned to New Orleans. He was recalled on September 3 when the rosters expanded.

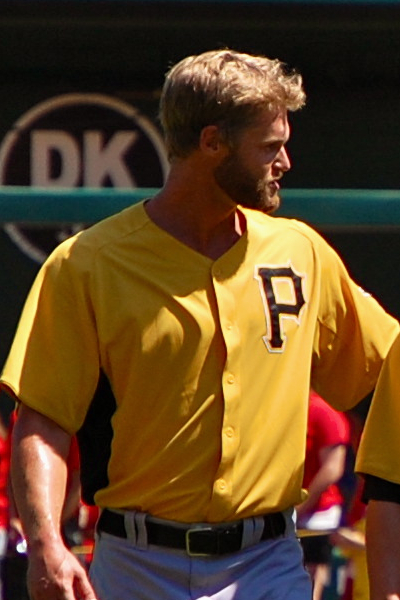
Leroux during his tenure with the Pittsburgh Pirates in 2011

==== Pittsburgh Pirates ====
Leroux was claimed off waivers by the Pittsburgh Pirates on September 13, 2010. In 23 games with both teams, he went 0-1 with a 6.75 ERA with 22 strikeouts in 22 2/3 innings.

Leroux began 2011 with the Indianapolis Indians of the Class AAA International League, but after a poor start, he was demoted to the Altoona Curve of the Class AA Eastern League. After a 5-game stint with Altoona, he returned to Indianapolis. On July 3, Leroux was recalled to Pittsburgh, replacing Brad Lincoln. He was optioned to Indianapolis on July 22, but was recalled 5 days later, only to be placed on the disabled list with a left calf strain 2 days after that. He was activated from the disabled list on August 22, and remained on the roster for the rest of the season. In 23 games with the Pirates, he went 1–1 with a 2.88 ERA.

Prior to the 2012 season, Leroux was placed on the 60-day DL with a right pectoral strain. He rejoined the club as a September call-up after rehab and an assignment to the AAA Indianapolis Indians. In 10 games with the Pirates, he had a 5.56 ERA with 12 strikeouts in 11.2 innings.

Leroux made the 2013 Opening Day roster with the Pirates, but was designated for assignment on April 12 after pitching in 2 games. He elected free agency on April 17, 2013.

==== Tokyo Yakult Swallows ====
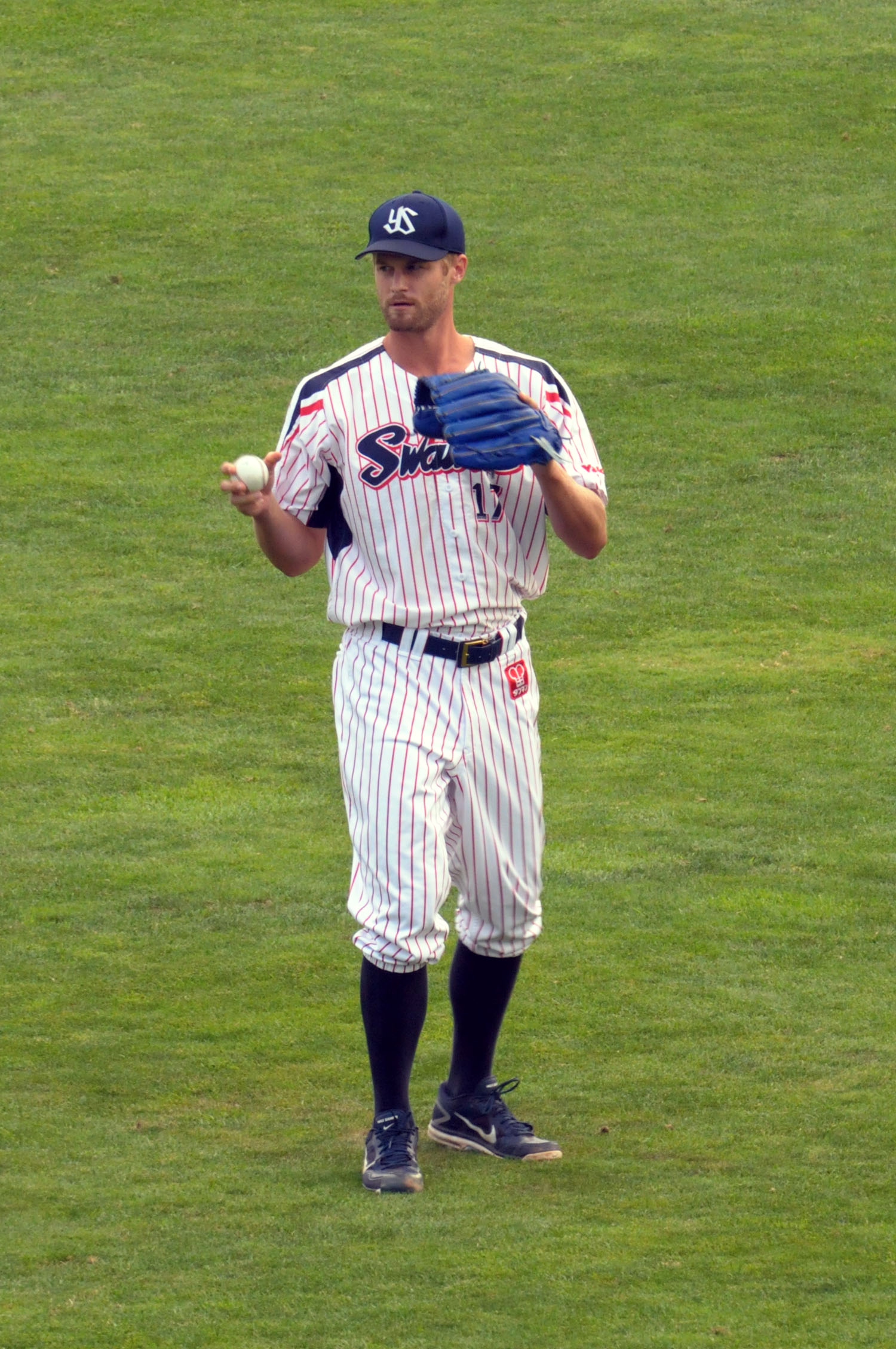
Leroux playing for the Tokyo Yakult Swallows of the Nippon Professional Baseball in 2013

On April 23, 2013, Leroux signed with the Tokyo Yakult Swallows of the Central League of Nippon Professional Baseball.

==== New York Yankees ====
On January 27, 2014, Leroux signed a minor league contract with the New York Yankees. The deal included an invitation to major league spring training. Leroux began the season with the Scranton/Wilkes-Barre RailRiders of the International League. He made his Yankee debut on April 29, 2014. He was designated for assignment on May 3, 2014. He was called back up by the Yankees on July 23, 2014, but was designated for assignment two days later. He was called back up a third time on August 11, 2014 and again designated for assignment two days later. After the 2014 season, he became a free agent. After pitching two innings, he earned a 22.50 ERA, a loss, and didn't earn a win.

==== Later career ====
Leroux signed a minor league deal with the Milwaukee Brewers on January 26, 2015. He began the season with the Colorado Springs Sky Sox of the PCL. On May 18, 2015, he was traded to the Philadelphia Phillies for cash considerations. He spent the rest of the season with the Reading Fightin Phils of the Eastern League and the Lehigh Valley IronPigs of the International League.

On April 3, 2016, Leroux was traded to the Toronto Blue Jays for cash considerations, and assigned to the Buffalo Bisons of the International League. He was released on August 28.

After playing for the Canadian national team in the 2017 World Baseball Classic, Leroux retired from baseball.

== International career ==
He was selected to the Canada national baseball team at the 2009 World Baseball Classic, 2013 World Baseball Classic, 2015 Pan American Games, 2015 WBSC Premier12, 2017 World Baseball Classic, 2019 Pan American Games Qualifier, 2019 Pan American Games and 2019 WBSC Premier12.

== Pitching style ==
Leroux throws three pitches: a four-seam fastball and two-seam fastball in the low-to-mid 90s, and a slider in the low-to-mid 80s. He also used to throw a changeup to left-handed hitters, but he dropped it after the 2011 season to simplify his pitching approach.

== Personal life ==
In 2017, Leroux was cast as the Bachelor on The Bachelor Canada.
