= BAC =

BAC or Bac may refer to:

== Arts and entertainment ==
=== Arts centres and arts councils ===
- Balochistan Arts Council, in Quetta, Pakistan
- Baryshnikov Arts Center, in Manhattan, New York City
- Battersea Arts Centre, London, England
- Beirut Art Center, Lebanon
- Belger Arts Center, Kansas City, Missouri, US
- Benedicta Arts Center, St. Joseph, Minnesota, US
- Berkeley Art Center, California, US
- Black Arts Council, US
- Brampton Arts Council, Ontario, Canada
- Brooklyn Arts Council, New York City, New York, US

=== Other uses in arts and entertainment ===
- André Bac (1905–1989), a French cinematographer
- Ferdinand Bac (1859–1952), a German-French cartoonist, artist, and writer
- BAC Films, a French film production and distribution company
- BAC Inc.
- Batman: Arkham City, a 2011 video game
- Big Apple Chorus, New York–based barbershop chorus
- Big Apple Circus
- Boston Area Crusaders, former name of the Boston Crusaders Drum and Bugle Corps
- Brixton Artists Collective, group of artists in London in the 1980s
- Burma Art Club
- Bac Ishii or Baku Ishii (1886–1962), a Japanese dancer and choreographer

== Businesses ==
=== Aerospace companies ===
- BAC Express Airlines or BAC Aircraft, British cargo airline
- Bahrain Airport Company
- Bangabandhu Aeronautical Centre
- Boeing Airplane Company, the former name of Boeing Commercial Airplanes
- Bristol Aeroplane Company (1920–1956), British aviation company
- British Aircraft Company (1930–1936), British aviation company
- British Aircraft Corporation (1959/1960–1977), British aviation company

=== Other businesses ===
- BAC Credomatic, a Central American financial company
- Bank of America, which trades on the New York Stock Exchange under the stock ticker BAC
- Brandenburg African Company
- Breed Automotive Corporation, now known as Joyson Safety Systems
- Briggs Automotive Company, a British car manufacturing company

== Education ==
=== Colleges ===
- Balochistan Agriculture College, Quetta, Pakistan
- Belmont Abbey College, Belmont, North Carolina, US
- Boston Architectural College, Boston, Massachusetts, US
- Botswana Accountancy College, Gaborone, Botswana
- Broughton Anglican College, a school in Menangle, New South Wales, Australia
- Branch Agricultural College, Cedar City, Utah, US
- Bukalasa Agricultural College, Uganda

=== Other uses in education ===
- Baccalaureate (disambiguation), the name of a number of educational qualifications
- Bangladesh Accreditation Council
- Basic Airborne Course, of the United States Army Airborne School
- British Accreditation Council, a British educational accreditation agency

== Governmental organizations ==
- Bangladesh Accreditation Council
- Bibliothèque et Archives Canada or Library and Archives Canada, in Ottawa
- Brigada Anticrime, Cape Verde
- Brigade ammunition column
- Brigade anti-criminalité, service of the French National Police
- Bureau of Air Commerce
- Bureau of Anti-Corruption, predecessor of the Anti-Corruption Commission in Bangladesh

== Medicine, science, and technology ==
- BACnet, building automation and control
- .BAC, a filetype used by the RSTS/E timesharing system for compiled BASIC-PLUS files
- Bacterial artificial chromosome, a DNA construct used for transforming and cloning in bacteria
- Basic access control, a protocol used to transmit data contained in a passport equipped with RFID chip
- Bead activated carbon
- Benzalkonium chloride, a type of cationic surfactant
- Biological-activated carbon, used in water treatment
- Blood alcohol content or blood alcohol concentration
- Bronchioloalveolar carcinoma, a type of lung cancer often diagnosed in non-smokers
- HP Business Availability Center, software in HP Business Service Management

== Places ==
=== In the Balkans ===
- Bać, Rožaje, a village in Montenegro
- Bač, Ilirska Bistrica, a village in Slovenia
- Bač, North Macedonia, a village and former municipality
- Bač, Serbia, a town and municipality in the South Bačka District
  - Bač Fortress
- Bač pri Materiji, a settlement in the municipality of Hrpelje–Kozina, Slovenia
- Báč, a village in Slovakia
- Bâc or Bîc, a Moldovan river

=== In western Europe ===
- Bac, Western Isles, or Back, a district and village in Scotland
- Bache railway station (station code: BAC), England
- Baile Átha Cliath or Dublin, the capital city of Ireland
- Basque Autonomous Community, Spain
- La Vall del Bac, village in La Vall de Bianya, Catalonia, Spain
- Rue du Bac, Paris, street in France

=== Other places ===
- Baç Bridge, bridge in Turkey
- Barnes County Municipal Airport (FAA airport code: BAC), Valley City, North Dakota, US; see List of airports in North Dakota
- Brisbane Administration Centre, Queensland, Australia

== Sport ==
- BAC Mirande, a French women's basketball club
- Bank Atlantic Center, an indoor arena in Sunrise, Florida, US
- Badminton Asia Confederation, governing body for badminton in Asia
- Bauru Atlético Clube, a Brazilian association football club
- Birmingham Athletic Club
- Belgrano Athletic Club
- British Athletes Commission
- Bulawayo Athletic Club

== Other uses ==
- Bač (name)
- Baduy language
- Bangla Congress, an Indian political party
- Basutoland African Congress or Basutoland Congress Party, a Lesotho political party
- Beijing Arbitration Commission
- Born-again Christian
- Britannia Aquatic Club or Britannia Yacht Club, a private social club in Ottawa, Ontario, Canada
- Brotherhood of the Ascended Christ, an Anglican religious order in India
- Budget at completion
- Burton Addiction Centre
- International Union of Bricklayers and Allied Craftworkers, a North American labour union
- Vương Văn Bắc (1927–2011), the last Minister of Foreign Affairs of South Vietnam

== See also ==
- 1,3-Bis(aminomethyl)cyclohexane
- Bač (disambiguation)
- Bacs (disambiguation)
- CBAC (disambiguation)
- Kbac (disambiguation)
- WBAC 1340 AM
