= Bač =

Bač may refer to:

== Places ==
In Montenegro:

- Bač, Montenegro, in the northeastern part of the country

In North Macedonia:

- Bač, North Macedonia, a village and former municipality

In Serbia:

- Bač, Serbia, a town and municipality in the South Bačka District
- Bač Fortress, a fortress

In Slovakia:

- Báč, a village

In Slovenia:

- Bač, Ilirska Bistrica, a village in the Municipality of Ilirska Bistrica
- Bač pri Materiji, a settlement in the Municipality of Hrpelje–Kozina

== See also ==
- BAC (disambiguation)
