= Bač Municipality =

Bač Municipality may refer to:

- Bač, Serbia, a town and municipality in South Bačka District of Vojvodina, Serbia
- Bač, North Macedonia, a village and a former municipality in the southern part of North Macedonia; the municipality was attached to Novaci municipality in 2003

== See also ==
- Bač (disambiguation)
