= Bač pri Materiji =

- Location in Slovenia
- Coordinates: 45°34′36.46″N 14°0′15.29″E
- Country: Slovenia
- Traditional region: Littoral
- Statistical region: Coastal–Karst
- Municipality: Hrpelje-Kozina

Area
  - Total: 1.62 km^{2} (0.63 sq mi)
- Elevation: 536.5 m (1,760 ft)

Population (2002)
  - Total: 108

Bač pri Materiji (pronounced [ˈbatʃ pɾi matɛˈɾiːji]) is a small settlement in the Municipality of Hrpelje-Kozina in the Littoral region of Slovenia. The settlement includes the hamlet of Gabrk half a kilometer southeast of the village core. It is located in heavily karstified terrain with many sinkholes and caves.

== Name ==
The name Bač pri Materiji literally means 'Bač near Materija'. The name Bač is related to the Slovene common noun beč '(stone- or wood-lined) hollow with a spring' (< *bъťъ), referring to a local geographical feature. The Slavic word *bъťъ was borrowed from Latin buttis 'barrel' and is also the origin of the Slovene toponyms Beč and Buč.

== History ==
A Roman road ran past the settlement of Bač pri Materiji. A stone built into a wall along the road is believed to be a Roman milestone. The ruins of Tabor Castle, of which only part of the tower are preserved, stand next to the road through the settlement. A communal village cistern was built in 1897. Running water was installed in 1935, with a water main from Buzet. Štefak Cave (Slovene: Štefakova pečina) was used by locals as a shelter from Italian fascist troops. During the Second World War, Partisan troops from the Brkini Hills were active in the area. On 14 September 1943, five Partisan soldiers were killed in an engagement with German troops in the village. Until the Second World War, the structure in the hamlet of Gabrk was used as a military barracks. After the war, it was used as a toy factory. During the war, much of the wooded land around the settlement was burned; fire also destroyed extensive woodland in 1958. A civic center was established in 1955.

=== Mass grave ===
Bač pri Materiji is the site of a mass grave associated with the Second World War. The Materija 1 Mass Grave (Slovene: Grobišče Materija 1) is located about 500 m north of the settlement. It is a shaft with an opening measuring 2 × 1.5 m, bounded on two sides by cliffs rising up to a plateau. Spelunkers have found what are believed to be human remains in the shaft.

== Church ==
The small church in Bač pri Materiji is dedicated to Saint George. It has an open belfry and was restored in 1865. It is also referred to as Tabor Church or Holy Spirit Church. The first church at the site was dedicated to the Holy Spirit. That church was burned by the Venetians in 1616, and a new church dedicated to Saint Vitus was built at the same site in 1636. An altar dedicated to the Holy Spirit, in memory of the previous structure, was installed in the church in 1855, but it has since been removed and only the altar painting remains.
