= CBAC =

CBAC may refer to:

- Unicode hex code: CBAC (쮬), see List of modern Hangul characters in ISO/IEC 2022–compliant national character set standards
- CBAC-FM, a radio station (99.9 FM) licensed to Tuktoyaktuk, Northwest Territories, Canada (formerly CBAC (AM))
- Canadian Baptists of Atlantic Canada
- Chinese Benevolent Association of Canada, see Chinese Canadians in Greater Vancouver
- Canadian Breath Analyzer Company, a company providing designated driver services
- Context-based access control, a firewall feature that filters packets
- WJEC (exam board) (Welsh: Cyd-bwyllgor Addysg Cymru; Welsh Joint Education Committee), a Welsh exam board

== See also ==
- BAC (disambiguation)
- Kbac (disambiguation)
- WBAC 1340 AM
