= Kbac =

Kbac or variation, may refer to:

- Kvass (Russian: квас; kBac), a non-alcoholic Slavic fermented rye bread beverage
- KBAC 98.1 FM Santa Fe, New Mexico, USA; a radio station
- Kalamazoo Book Arts Center, Kalamazoo, Michigan, USA; an artists non-profit
- Barnes County Municipal Airport (ICAO airport code: KBAC; FAA airport code: BAC) Valley City, North Dakota, USA; see List of airports in North Dakota
- KBAC TV 3, a fictional TV station found in Astro City, see List of Astro City characters

== See also ==
- The dictionary definition of квас at Wiktionary
- Kindergarten Behaviour and Academic Competency Scale (KBACS) for Kindergarten readiness
- BAC (disambiguation)
- CBAC (disambiguation)
- WBAC 1340 AM, Cleveland, Tennessee, USA; a radio station
