= HP Business Service Automation =

Software family

HP Business Service Automation was a collection of software products for data center automation from the HP Software Division of Hewlett-Packard Company. The products could help Information Technology departments create a common, enterprise-wide view of each business service; enable the automation of change and compliance across all devices that make up a business service; connect IT processes and coordinate teams via common workflows; and integrate with monitoring and ticketing tools to form a complete, integrated business service management solution. HP now provides many of these capabilities as part of HP Business Service Management software and solutions.

== Need for automation ==
IT no longer competes against past practices and cost structures. IT now competes against the costs structures of cloud computing and software as a service (SaaS) providers and hosts. To remain competitive, and to determine what to retain and what to outsource, IT needs to make all of its systems and applications perform better and more efficiently. IT also needs to automate the applications and systems to keep complexity and costs in line. Visibility, automation and management are essential, regardless of the underlying infrastructure. They also allow IT to function as the best broker of services, regardless of where the servers may reside.

The efficiencies of having this type of integration, automation and management have led to the rise of Converged Infrastructure environments. This type of data center environment allows enterprises to get their applications up and running faster, with easier manageability and less maintenance, and enables IT to more rapidly adjust IT resources (such as servers, storage and networking) to meet fluctuating and unpredictable business demand.

== Products ==
HP Business Service Automation consisted of several software products that encompassed both data center automation and client automation with runtime visibility and control over the data center.

HP Server Automation software automates the server lifecycle for physical and virtual servers and automates the deployment of applications.

HP Application Deployment Manager (ADM) software automated the release process to bridge the gap among development, quality assurance and operations teams.

HP Network Automation Software delivers network change and configuration management through real-time visibility, automation and control for network compliance, security and cost savings.

HP Operations Orchestration software is an IT process automation platform that provides a single view for automating IT processes in hybrid IT infrastructures, including cloud computing environments.

HP Storage Essentials software, standards-based storage resource management software, provides visibility into applications, drilling down from host to storage infrastructure.

HP Database and Middleware Automation software, from the acquisition of Stratavia automates the provisioning, patching, compliance and configuration management of heterogeneous databases and application servers.

HP Service Automation Visualizer software presented a global, interactive picture of an IT environment, including all servers, software, network devices, storage, configurations and interdependencies.

HP Business Service Automation (BSA) Essentials provides content, infrastructure and services for users. It includes a portal for security updates, compliance policy checks and content, and application management profiles.

BSA Essentials reporting is a reporting engine for ad hoc and cross-domain analysis and compliance reports.
