= Institute of Advanced Legal Studies =

Law school of the United Kingdom

Coordinates: 51.5223°N 0.1274°W

- Type: Law school
- Established: 1947
- Parent institution: School of Advanced Study, University of London
- Chairman: Lord Lloyd-Jones
- Director: Carl Stychin
- Academic staff: Anat Rosenburg (Professor of Law and the Humanities and Director of LHub); Susan Breau (Professor and Director of Research Students); Constantin Stefanou (Professor in Practice of Legislative Drafting and Director of the Sir William Dale Centre); Nora Ni Loideain (Reader in Law and Director of the Information Law and Policy Centre)
- Administrative staff: Marilyn Clarke (Librarian)
- Location: London, England, United Kingdom
- Campus: Urban
- Website: ials.sas.ac.uk

The Institute of Advanced Legal Studies (IALS) is a member institute of the School of Advanced Study, University of London. Founded in 1947, it is a national academic centre of excellence, serving the legal community and universities across the United Kingdom and the world through legal scholarship, facilities, and its comparative law library.

The mission of the institute is to be "the focal point of legal research for the United Kingdom and the countries of the British Commonwealth."

Since 1976, the institute's home has been Charles Clore House, located in the heart of Bloomsbury, at 17 Russell Square.

== History ==
The Institute of Advanced Legal Studies was established in 1947 in response to recommendations made in 1932 by Lord Atkin that the United Kingdom needed an institution "which would be a headquarters for academic research and would promote the advancement of knowledge of the law in the most general terms." On 11 June 1948, the institute was officially opened by the Lord Chancellor, William Jowitt, 1st Earl Jowitt. The first director was Professor Sir David Hughes Parry, a distinguished Professor of English Law at the London School of Economics and for many years Vice-Chancellor of the University of London. The Librarian, K. Howard Drake also acted as administrative secretary for the institute.

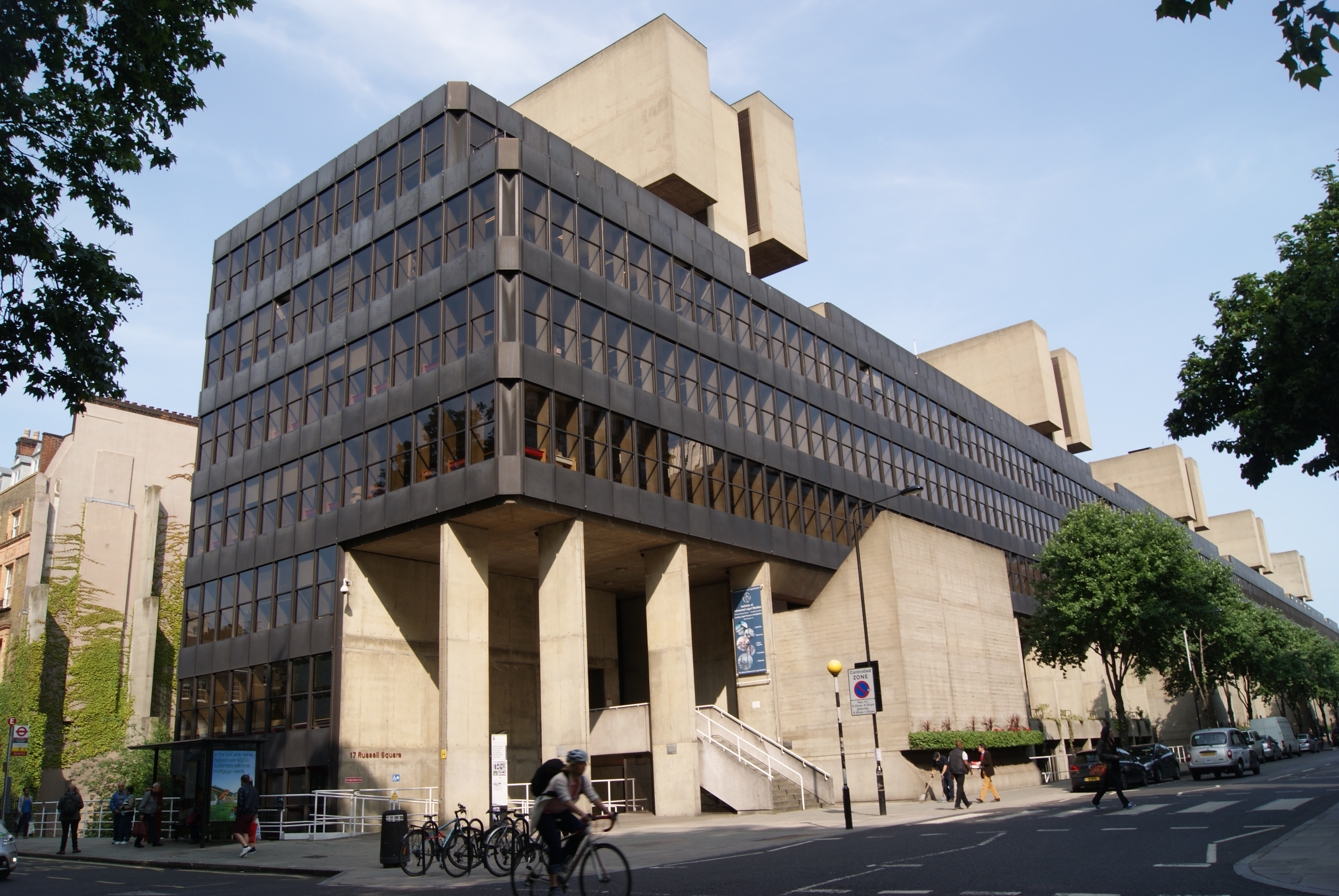
Charles Clore House at 17 Russell Square, London, the present home of the Institute of Advanced Legal Studies

Housed at 25 Russell Square, the institute occupied all floors of the building, the ground and first floors reserved for the library with rooms on the second and third converted into offices or study/seminar rooms. The library held 11,000 books in its first year, a substantial number donated by Dr. Charles Huberich. An internal telephone system connected all the rooms with a hand book lift installed to move books from floor to floor.

By 1949, the institute was running out of space and were given permission to extend into the basement and ground floor 26 Russell Square. Here it remained until 1976, when the institute moved into No. 17 Russell Square, part of the newly built Charles Clore House designed by Sir Denys Lasdun. At the official opening on 1 April 1976, the then Chancellor of the University of London, Queen Elizabeth the Queen Mother, overstayed and her official schedule had to be abandoned.

In 1994, the IALS became a member of the School of Advanced Study.

A five-year refurbishment of Charles Clore House is currently underway, the first phase of which was completed in September 2012, incorporating a larger café and improved lecture facilities on the ground floor.

== Library ==
=== Collections ===
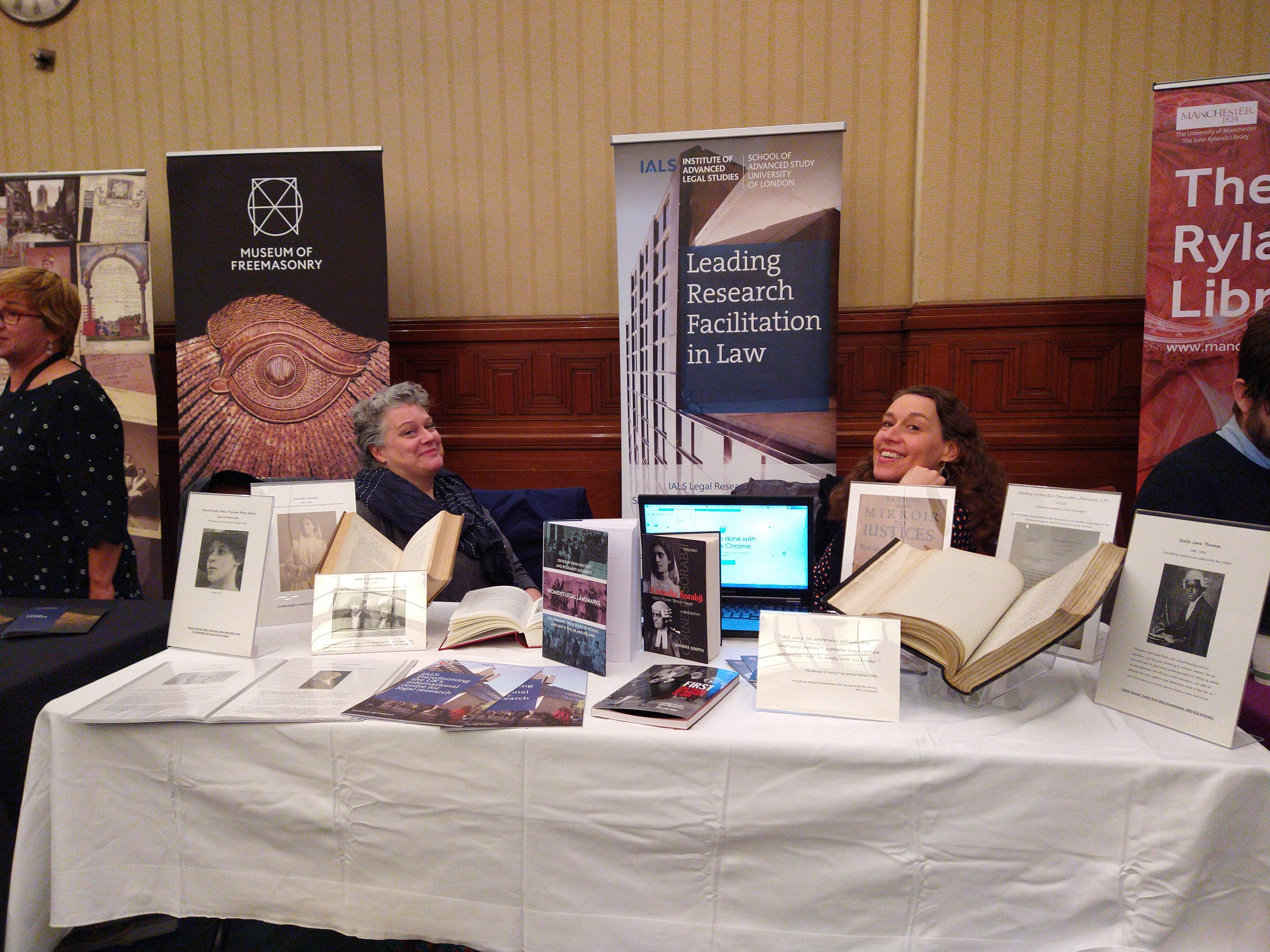
The Institute of Advanced Legal Studies at the Senate House History Day, 2019.

The IALS library holds a collection of over 300,000 legal texts, complemented by over 3,000 current serial titles, reports, and legislative materials. It has been described as the "jewel in the Institute's crown", and is a repository library for legal texts published in the United Kingdom. The library covers five floors of Charles Clore House with the library entrance on the fourth floor. The library catalogue forms part of a shared catalogue with its fellow School of Advanced Study institutes and that of Senate House Library.

The institute library is considered one of the world's leading comparative research libraries, holding significant material not otherwise available in the United Kingdom. Jurisdictions covered include countries in, North America, Latin America, Europe (including the European Union) and the Commonwealth. The library is particularly strong in Public International Law. It has a large collection of United States Federal resources and holdings of State primary resources, focused on California, New York, Pennsylvania, Texas, and Louisiana. Postgraduate law students of the University of London colleges, including University College London, London School of Economics and Political Science, King's College London, and Queen Mary, University of London rely exclusively on the institute's research holdings for coursework.

=== Projects ===
Since the late 1990s, IALS has participated in collaborative and standalone digital projects resulting in a number of searchable databases publicly available via the website. These include FLAG (Foreign Law Guides), FIT (Flare Index to Treaties), and Eagle-I, which builds upon the original Jisc funded Intute: Law project (formerly SOSIG Law).

=== Collaborations ===
The IALS library has partnered with other libraries and organisations in promotions and projects to highlight legal research. The library concentrates on printed and digital resources, often as lead developer for web-based initiatives. Ongoing collaborations with the British Library and BAILII have led to increased web presence for legal research, with IALS hosting BAILII and supporting its role in providing free access to full text British and Irish legal materials. The Concordat with the British Library is a collaboration to map existing holdings in foreign legal materials in both libraries and collate information to form a national collection of foreign official gazettes. In 2003, the library became a charter member of LLCM-Digital, a US-based consortium of libraries dedicated to the preservation of legal documentation for dissemination via a searchable online database.

== Research ==
The institute actively promotes research by its own academic staff and students in conjunction with its role as a national legal research centre. Research centres at the institute contribute to legal research via externally funded projects or study, with the Sir William Dale Centre, and Woolf Chair of Legal Education at the fore. Areas of research conducted by the institute include legislative drafting, human rights, international financial regulation, and transnational taxation law. Notable recent works by Institute faculty includes Thornton's Legislative Drafting, Fifth Edition, by Professor Helen Xanthaki, and Foundations and Future of Financial Regulation and European Comparative Company Law by Professor Mads Andenas.

Through its association with the School of Advanced Study, the institute offers a number of fellowships for legal research to both national and international legal academics and practitioners. Fellows give lectures in their field of expertise during their tenure.

== Postgraduate programmes ==
There are over 70 Ph.D./M.Phil. students studying at the Institute of Advanced Legal Studies, in addition to postgraduate law students registered for LL.M. and M.A. degrees.

The LL.M. in Drafting Legislation, Regulation, and Policy, which the institute claims is "prized by governments around the world as the flagship degree in the subject," trains lawyers from across the common law world in the art of statutory drafting, law reform, and the legislative process. The programme emphasizes a "blend of academic and practitioner concerns in [an] area of critical constitutional importance."

During the summer term, short courses are available on a variety of relevant topics. Courses include the Sir William Dale Centre Course in Legislative Drafting and the Certificate in International Commercial Arbitration.

In 2013, the peer-reviewed IALS Student Law Review was founded, offering both Master's and Ph.D. students the opportunity to publish original research and manage a scholarly journal.

== Lectures and exchange programmes ==
The institute has one main lecture theatre complemented by a number of smaller lecture/seminar rooms. Each year, it arranges workshops and lectures for academics and practitioners. Two annual conferences hosted by the IALS are the W. G. Hart Workshop and the Hamlyn Lectures series.

The institute maintains exchange programmes with foreign legal institutions. A partnership with the Beijing Arbitration Commission, established in 2012, seeks to promote the study of alternative dispute resolution, and deepen Sino-British legal relationships. The IALS has also begun an exchange programme with judges from the Brazilian State of Pernambuco and the School of Advanced Judicial Studies of Pernambuco. This program focuses on comparative common law/civil law features and law reform consequences.
