= Don Reitz =

American ceramic artist (1929–2014)

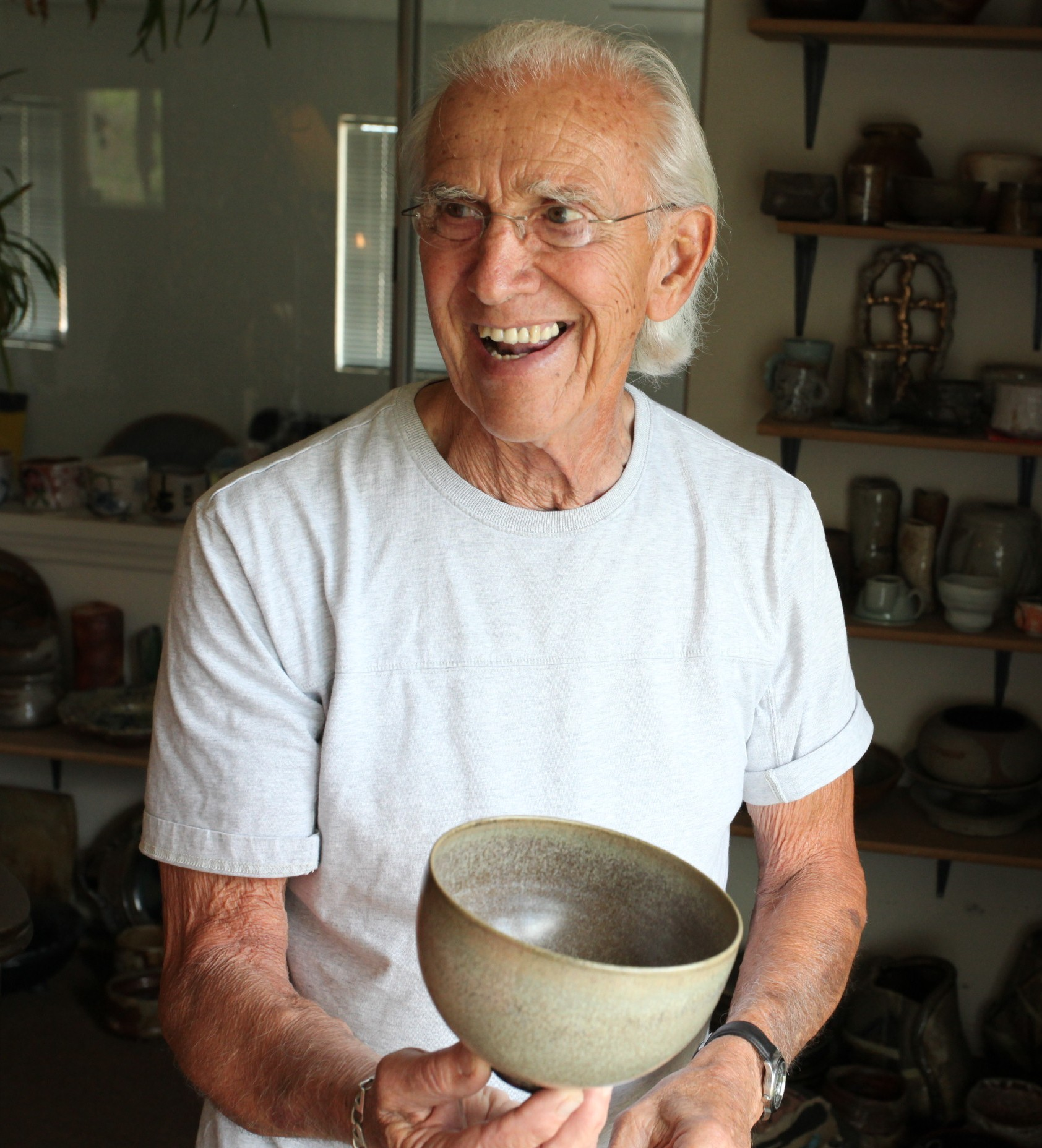
- Don Reitz in 2009
- Born: Donald Lester Reitz; November 7, 1929; Sunbury, Pennsylvania
- Died: March 19, 2014 (aged 84); Clarkdale, Arizona
- Education: Kutztown State Teachers College; Alfred University
- Employer: University of Wisconsin–Madison
- Website: donreitz.com

Donald Lester Reitz (November 7, 1929 – March 19, 2014) was an American ceramic artist, recognized for inspiring a reemergence of salt glaze pottery in United States. He was a teacher of ceramic art at the University of Wisconsin–Madison from 1962 until 1988. During this period, he adapted the pottery firing technique developed in the Middle Ages, which involved pouring salt into the pottery kiln during the firing stage. The method was taught in European ceramic art schools, but largely unknown in United States studio pottery.

In 1982, Reitz was in a serious car accident involving a truck and was hospitalized for several months. While recovering from his injury, he began to create a series of ceramic pieces that came to be known by a collective name, Sara Period. In 2007, Reitz suffered a heart attack and would undergo close to a dozen surgeries, including a valve replacement. He continued producing works with the help of studio assistants.

Reitz died on March 19, 2014, at the age of 84 of heart failure and was eulogized by The New York Times and the American Craft Council. His works are featured in several museums including the Smithsonian Institution, American Museum of Ceramic Art, and Museum of Fine Arts, Boston.

== Early life and education ==
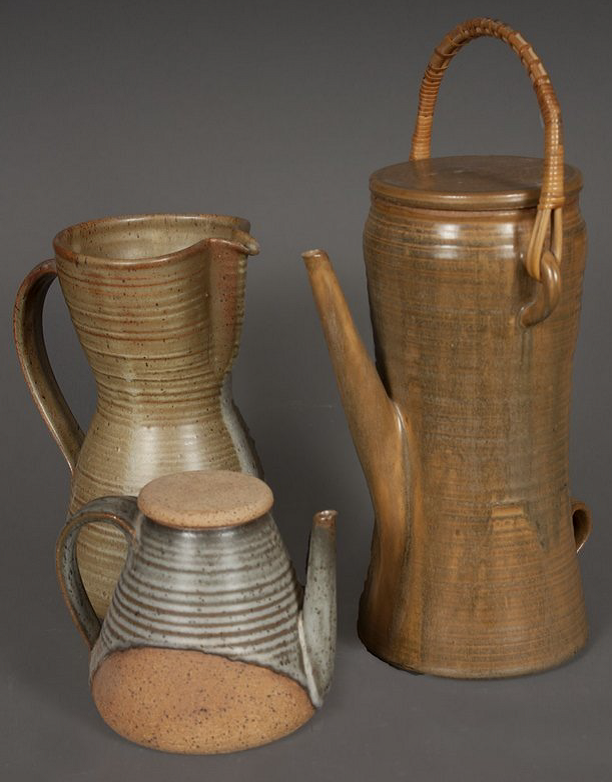
Pitcher, Coffee Pot, and Teapot, 1962 stoneware

Reitz was born on November 7, 1929, in Sunbury, Pennsylvania, just over a week after Black Tuesday. He was raised in Belvidere, New Jersey and graduated from Belvidere High School in 1948.

In 1948, he enlisted in the United States Navy, and served for five years as a diver. He later had several other occupations including working as a butcher. He spent his days as a butcher and would paint at night. He attended college utilizing the G.I. Bill. He went to Kutztown State Teachers College, where he studied abstract expressionism and only discovered his passion for working on the potter's wheel in his last semester. He graduated from the college in 1957 with a bachelor's degree in art education.

Reitz went on to attend New York State College of Ceramics at Alfred University. At first, his work involved functional pieces in the "modernist-style." Reitz graduated from Alfred with a Master of Fine Arts degree in 1962.

== Career ==
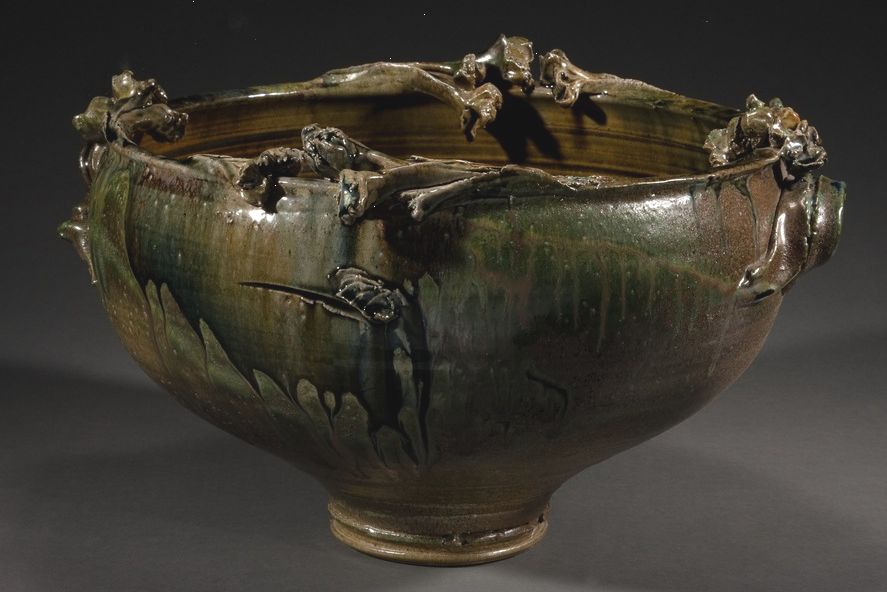
Trophy Bowl, ca. 1962 to 1982. Salt-glazed stoneware

After graduating from the College of Ceramics, Reitz began teaching at the University of Wisconsin–Madison. He took over teaching ceramics, a position that had become available when Harvey Littleton, the previous ceramics teacher, had instead began a glass program at the university.

Early in this period, Reitz began exploring other forms of pottery, moving beyond the functional tableware.

At Alfred University, he was exposed to and began experimenting with salt glaze pottery. The method results in brownish "luminous colors and a sparkling surface." He taught the method at the university and popularized it. Some art historians like Martha Drexler Lynn and fellow potters like Phil Rogers have called him a pioneer of salt glaze in United States studio pottery.

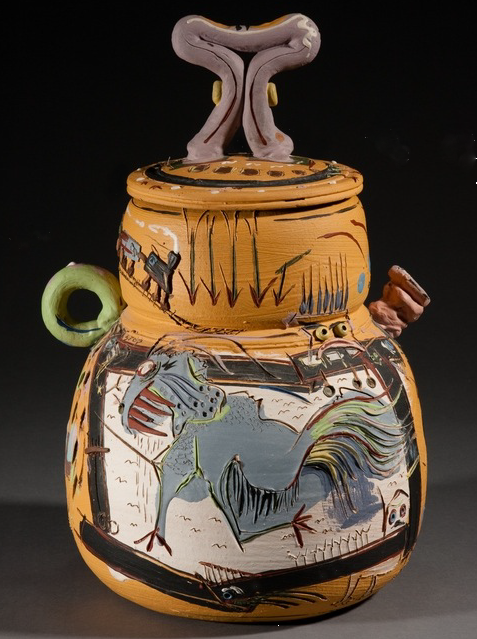
Sara's Dream, 1984. Earthenware, low-fired salt with engobes

In 1977, he was named a Fellow of the American Craft Council. Two salt-glazed pieces, "Tie Down Salt Glazed Covered Jar" (1980) and "Large Pitcher" (no known date) are held by the Smithsonian Institution.

In 1982, Reitz was involved in a serious truck accident. He was hospitalized for several months, at which time, he began a mail correspondence with his niece Sara. His niece, who was receiving treatment for cancer, would send him get-well cards that contained pictures she had drawn. Reitz began incorporating her drawings in his ceramics, "tracing them into large platters of clay" and other ceramic vessels.

His series of works during this time came to be known as the Sara Period. Reitz would say of the series, "The Sara series is very important. It was a healing series, a spiritual series, and we both valued it so much." "I never did any drawings of figures in clay until the Sara series. That, I think, started the drawing, the real drawing, and that was actually by accident when Sara and I were both healing each other." His niece would recover and he would continue to create ceramics well into the 21st century.

Several pieces from this period are held at the Lacoste Gallery in Concord, Massachusetts.

== Later years ==
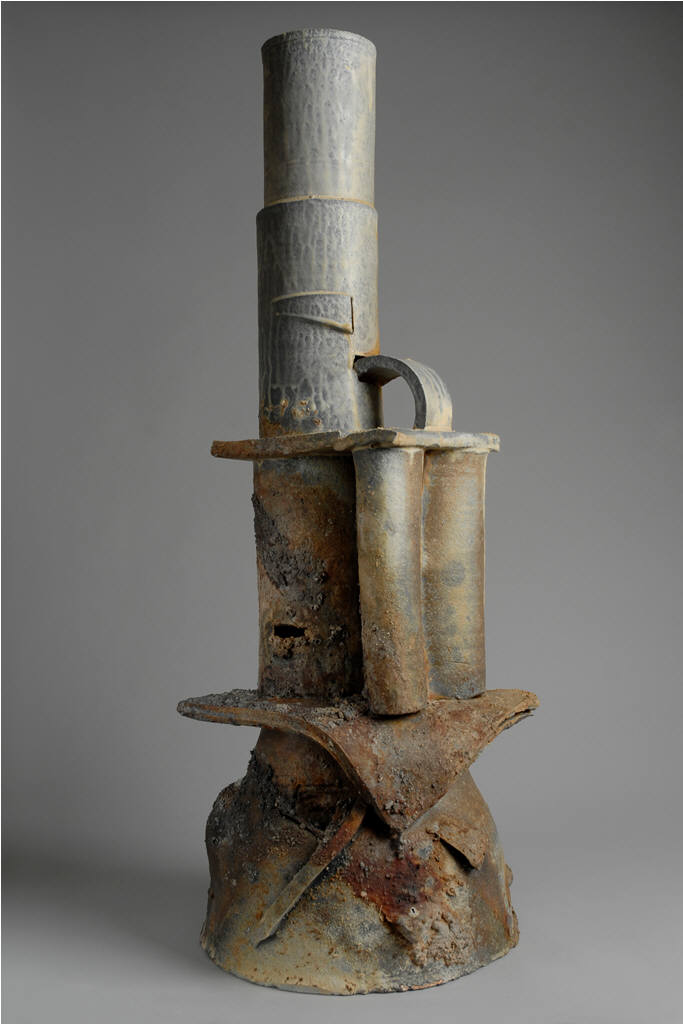
Florida Kachina, 2009. Wood-fired stoneware

Later in the 1980s and 90s, he became involved with wood firing ceramics as a collaboration with several artists, traveling to many ceramics studios to utilize different kilns for their varied effects. In 1988, he retired from the University of Wisconsin, but continued to work at his private studio in Clarkdale, Arizona.

Reitz was named on Ceramics Monthly's list of "greatest living ceramic artists worldwide" in 1988 and 2001. In 2002, he was awarded the American Craft Council's Gold Medal award.

In 2007, he suffered a heart attack and underwent a series of eleven surgeries, including a valve replacement. However, he continued producing works for several more years, this time, with the help of studio assistants and collaborative artists. He would take elements they molded in cylindrical shapes, modify and assemble them into abstract sculptures, statuettes and table top pieces.

Reitz died of heart failure on March 19, 2014, at his residence in Clarkdale; he was 84 years old.

His works are featured in several museums including the Smithsonian Institution's Renwick Gallery in Washington, DC, American Museum of Ceramic Art, Museum of Arts and Design, High Museum of Art in Atlanta, Georgia and Museum of Fine Arts, Boston.

Notable exhibitions during this period include:

- Don Reitz: Clay, Fire, Salt, and Wood, touring exhibition in 2005
- Don Reitz at the Belger Arts Center, Kansas City, Missouri 2012
- Don Reitz:Trial by Fire at American Museum of Ceramic Art, Pomona, California

== Sources ==
- Brandenburg, John (2013-04-17). "Ceramics show's rough expressiveness draws in viewers". The Oklahoman.
- Fox, Margalit (2014-03-29). "Don Reitz, Who Made Dirt and Salt into Art, Dies at 84". The New York Times.
- Held, Peter (2011-08-20). "The Fearless Nature of Being: The Legacy of Don Reitz". Sculpture Objects Functional Art + Design.
- Hernandez, Jo Farb (2009-10-01). "Don Reitz: Out of the Ashes". Ceramics: Art and Perception. 77: 3–7.
- Koplos, Janet; Metcalf, Bruce (2010-07-31). Makers: A History of American Studio Craft. University of North Carolina Press. ISBN 9780807895832.
- Lynn, Martha Drexler (2015). American Studio Ceramics: Innovation and Identity, 1940 to 1979. Yale University Press. ISBN 9780300212730.
- Peterson, Susan; Peterson, Jan (2002). Working with Clay. Laurence King Publishing. ISBN 9781856693172.
- Riedel, Mija (2006-06-06). "Oral history interview with Don Reitz". Smithsonian Archives of American Art.
- Rogers, Phil (2002). Salt Glazing. University of Pennsylvania Press. ISBN 071364821X.
- Shaykett, Jessica (2014-03-25). "Remembering: Don Reitz". American Craft Council.
- Spencer, Laura (2012-10-11). "Artist Don Reitz, Art As Discovery at the Belger Arts Center". KCUR-FM.
- "Donald L Reitz", United States census, 1930; Sunbury, Northumberland, Pennsylvania; page 6A, line 33, enumeration district 75, Family History film 2341825, National Archives film number T626-2091.
- "Tie Down Salt Glazed Covered Jar by Don Reitz". Smithsonian American Art Museum.
- "Large Pitcher by Don Reitz". Smithsonian American Art Museum.
- "Don Reitz artwork". Lacoste Gallery.
- "Milestone: Don Reitz Passes at 84". CFile – Contemporary Ceramic Art + Design. 2014-03-25.
