= Leon Žlebnik =

Slovenian philosopher, pedagogue, and psychologist

Leon Žlebnik (29 January 1918, Materija – 7 September 2004, Ljubljana) was a Slovenian philosopher, pedagogue, and psychologist.

== Biography ==
Žlebnik's academic and professional journey spans various aspects of education, philosophy, and psychology. After completing his classical gymnasium education in Šentvid near Ljubljana between 1929 and 1937, he delved into higher studies at the Faculty of Arts in Ljubljana. From 1937 to 1941, he pursued studies in philosophy and pedagogy, culminating in the completion of his doctorate in 1942 with a dissertation titled "Emocionalna struktura eudajmonije," (The Emotional Structure of Eudaimonia).

During the challenging wartime period, Žlebnik supported himself through various occasional jobs. Notably, from September 1941 onwards, he collaborated with the Liberation Front (OF), an anti-fascist resistance movement. This involvement led to his internment in Gonars from 1942 to 1943.

Following the liberation, Žlebnik contributed to various institutions, including the Propaganda Commission of the Liberation Front and the library of the Department of Health Education at the Ministry of Health in Ljubljana, demonstrating a commitment to educational and public service.

His academic career continued as he became a senior lecturer in pedagogy and psychology at the Higher Pedagogical School in Ljubljana, later renamed the Faculty of Education, where he worked until 1975. Subsequently, he transitioned to the Faculty of Organizational Sciences in Kranj, teaching until 1988, eventually attaining the position of a full professor.

Throughout his extensive career, Žlebnik's research interests encompassed a wide array of topics, including the theory of education, the general history of pedagogy, family education, developmental psychology, and the ethics of interpersonal relationships. His contributions and teachings left a lasting impact on the fields of education and psychology in Slovenia.

== Works ==
- Obča zgodovina pedagogike. 1955 (albanian Prishtina 1959, 1964)
- Ljudje med seboj, I & II (1955),
- Izbrani teksti pedagoških klasikov (1956),
- Psihologija otroka in mladostnika I (1960) & II (1963),
- Da bi se bolje razumeli (1963),
- Vajino ljubezensko zorenje (1966),
- Vzgoja in izobraževanje (1980).

== See also ==
- Pedagogy
- History of Education
- University of Ljubljana
