= Mads Andenæs =

International law scholar

Mads Andenæs KC (also spelt Andenas; born 27 July 1957) is a legal academic and former UN special rapporteur on arbitrary detention and the chair of UN Working Group on Arbitrary Detention. He is a professor at the Faculty of Law of the University of Oslo, the former director of the British Institute of International and Comparative Law, London and the former director of the Centre of European Law at King’s College, University of London.

== Life ==
In 2019, Andenæs was made Queen's Counsel honoris causa. He holds the degrees of Cand. Jur. (University of Oslo), Ph.D. (University of Cambridge) and M.A. and D.Phil. (University of Oxford), the Oxford degrees being awarded ad eundem gradum. Having a doctorate from both Oxford and Cambridge makes Andenas what Ghil'ad Zuckermann calls an "Oxbridge paradox". Andenas belongs to the rare group of people who hold a "pair o' docs" (sounding like "paradox" but meaning "two doctorates"), a D.Phil. (Oxon.) and a Ph.D. (Cantab.), from both Oxford and Cambridge universities (commonly abbreviated as Oxbridge).

Andenæs is a research fellow of the Institute of European and Comparative Law, University of Oxford and a senior research fellow at the Institute of Advanced Legal Studies, University of London.

He was visiting professor at University of Paris I (Sorbonne) in 2006 and University of Rome La Sapienza in 2002–2009. In 2002–2003 he held the Chaire W J Ganshof van der Meersch under the Fondation Philippe Wiener–Maurice Anspach at the Université libre de Bruxelles. In 2005 he was a fellow of Netherlands Institute for Advanced Study in the Humanities and Social Sciences. In 2006 he delivered the Annual Guido Carli Lecture at the University of LUISS Guido Carli, Rome. In 2008–2009 he delivered a series of lectures at l'École normale Supérieure, Paris om human rights and comparative law.

He was general editor of the International and Comparative Law Quarterly (Cambridge University Press), the general editor of European Business Law Review (Kluwer Law International) and on the editorial boards of ten other law journals and book series, including the Nijhoff Series on International Trade Law. He was an advisory editor of the University of Bologna Law Review, a generalist student-edited law journal published by the Department of Legal Studies of the University of Bologna.

He was the Secretary General of the Fédération internationale de droit européen 2000–2002, the Hon Secretary of the UK Association of European Law 1997–2008 and the Hon Secretary of the UK Committee of Comparative Law 1999–2005. He was the Chair, Association of Human Rights Institutes in 2008. Since 2009 Andenas has been a member of the UN Working Group on Arbitrary Detention.

== Honours and decorations ==
- – Grand Officer of the Order of Merit of the Italian Republic (2018)
- – Officier of the National Order of Merit (2022)

== Fellowships ==
- Honorary Fellow, Society of Legal Studies (UK)
- Fellow of the International Academy of Commercial and Consumer Law (where he is a member of the board)
- Honorary Fellow of the British Institute of International and Comparative Law
- Fellow of The Royal Society of the Arts
