= Belger Arts Center =

American nonprofit organization

Coordinates: 39.0877°N 94.5830°W

The Belger Arts Center (BAC) is a non-profit organization located in Kansas City, Missouri. It houses a fine art collection and also holds exhibitions of various art.

== Exhibitions ==
The Center stages three exhibitions a year. Since 2000 the BAC has launched exhibitions of ceramics, painting, sculpture, digital photographic projections, black-and-white photography, and more.

== Collection ==
In addition to the exhibitions, the BAC houses the John and Maxine Belger Family Foundation collection, which includes more than 1,500 pieces of fine art, mainly from American artists of the late 20th century. Extensive holdings of works by Jasper Johns, William Christenberry, Renee Stout, Robert Stackhouse, Terry Winters, Terry Allen, Don Reitz, and William Wiley allow the BAC to loan complete retrospectives of those artists to museums around the country. In the spring of 2006, complete exhibits from the BAC were seen at Texas Tech University, the Untitled [ArtSpace] in Oklahoma City, and the St. Petersburg Arts Center in Florida. In addition, two of the BAC's holdings by William Christenberry were loaned to the Smithsonian American Art Museum for a year-long survey of Mr. Christenberry's career.
