= Materija =

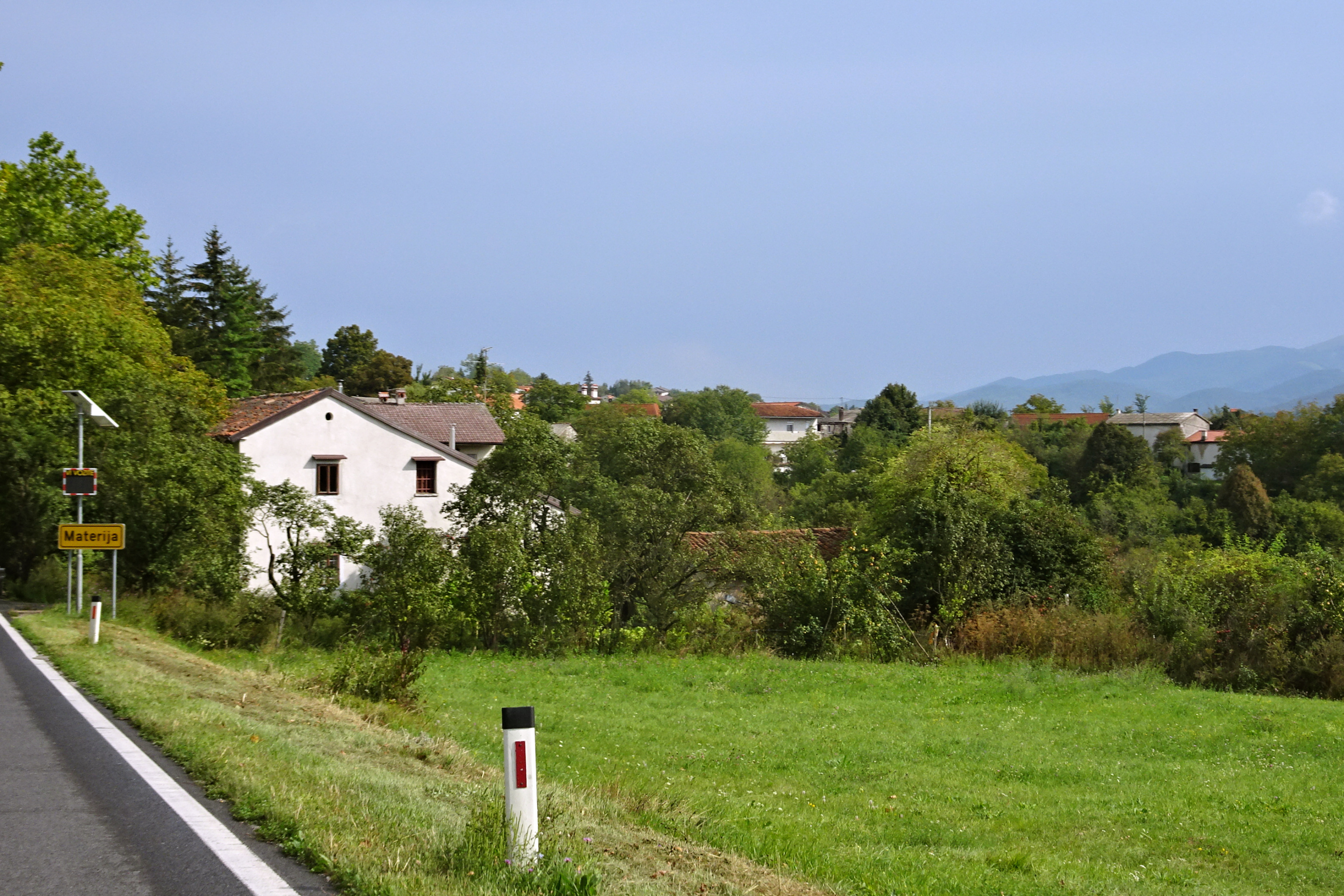

- Location in Slovenia
- Coordinates: 45°34′51.2″N 13°59′46.02″E
- Country: Slovenia
- Traditional region: Littoral
- Statistical region: Coastal–Karst
- Municipality: Hrpelje-Kozina

Area
  - Total: 2.66 km^{2} (1.03 sq mi)
- Elevation: 507.3 m (1,664 ft)

Population (2002)
  - Total: 60

Materija (pronounced [matɛˈɾiːja]; Italian: Matteria) is a small settlement in the Municipality of Hrpelje-Kozina in the Littoral region of Slovenia. It lies between fields and meadows in the Materija Lowland (Slovene: Matarsko podolje), a dry karst valley bottom, along Route 7 from Rijeka to Trieste.

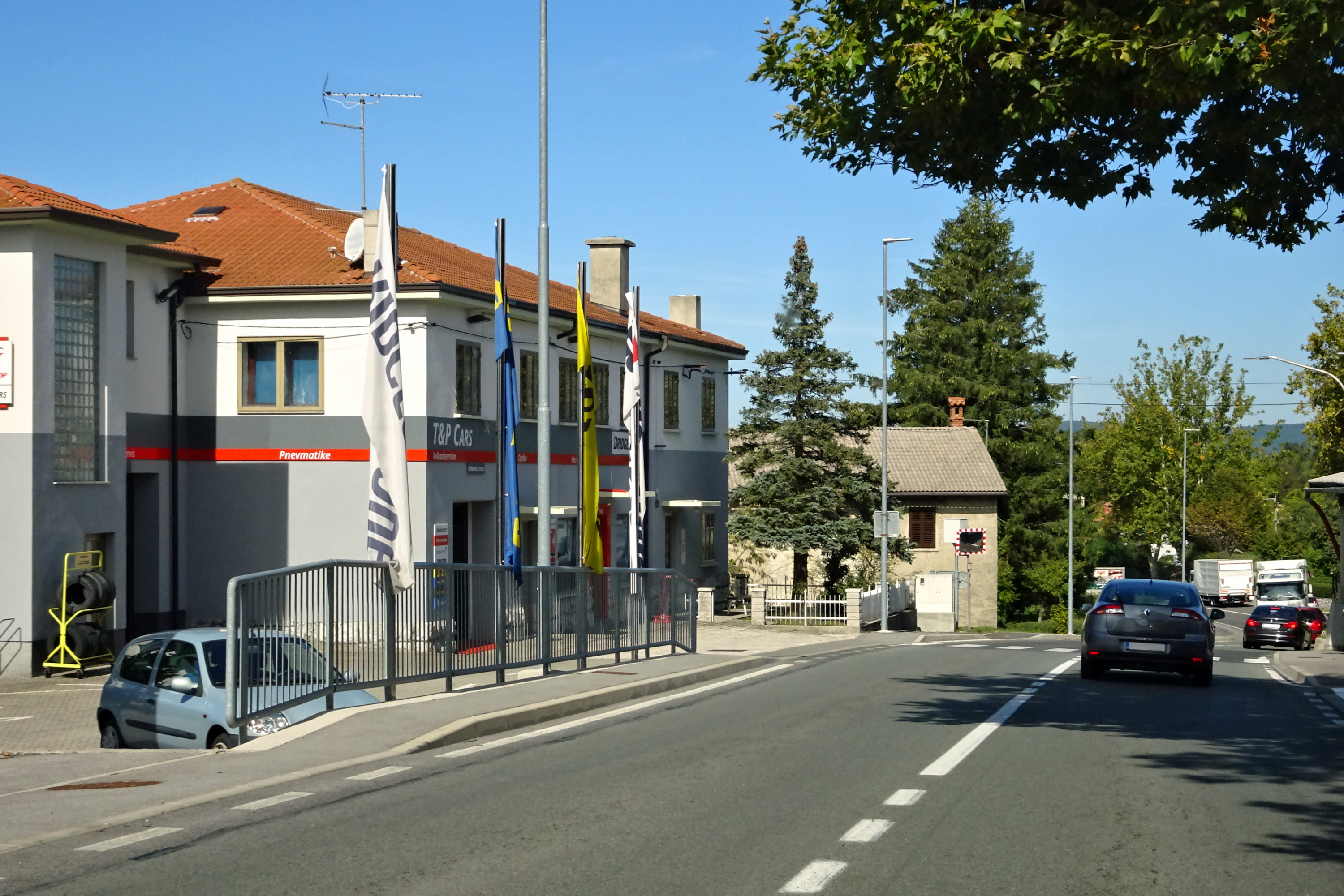
Materija village center

== Notable people ==
- Leon Žlebnik (1918–2004), philosopher
