= Bać, Rožaje =

Bać Баћ
- Village
- Location within Montenegro
- Country: Montenegro
- Municipality: Rožaje

Population (2011)
  - Total: 607
- Time zone: UTC+1 (CET)
  - Summer (DST): UTC+2 (CEST)

Bać (Serbian Cyrillic: Баћ) is a village in the municipality of Rožaje in eastern Montenegro. According to the 2011 census, its population was 607.

== Ethnicity ==
Ethnicity in 2011
| Ethnicity | Number | Percentage |
|---|---|---|
| Bosniaks | 575 | 94.7% |
| Albanians | 10 | 1.6% |
| other/undeclared | 22 | 3.6% |
| Total | 607 | 100% |
