= Baç Bridge =

Bridge in Tarsus, Mersin, Turkey

Baç Bridge (Jüstinyen Bridge)
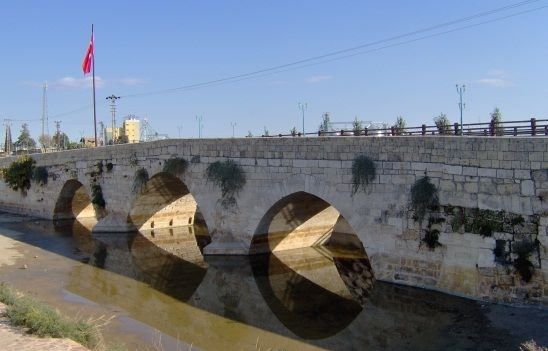
- Baç Bridge (Justinian Bridge)
- Coordinates: 36.9212°N 34.9187°E
- Crosses: Berdan River

Characteristics
- Material: Stone arches
- Total length: 60 m (200 ft)
- No. of spans: 3

History
- Construction start: ca. 550s
- Closed: 1960s

Location
- Interactive map of Baç Bridge (Jüstinyen Bridge)

Baç Bridge (Turkish: Baç Köprüsü also called Justinyen Köprüsü) is a bridge in Tarsus in Mersin Province, Turkey.

== Geography ==
The bridge is situated to the east of the city at about 36°55′17″N 34°55′04″E. Its distance to Tarsus city center is about 2.5 kilometres (1.6 mi) and to the Tarsus Waterfall is about 2 kilometres (1.2 mi). It is over the Berdan River (Latin:Cydnus), and on the former highway connecting Tarsus to Adana.

== History ==
During the ancient ages the course of Berdan River was at the west of the city which was then a Mediterranean Sea port. But because of alluvial deposits from the Berdan River the coastline was continuously moving to south. By the 6th century, the coastline had already been moved away and a small lagoon named Rhegma had been formed which obstructed the river flow in the rainy seasons and caused floods. Byzantine Emperor Justinian I (reigned 527-565) changed the course of the river by constructing a channel at the east of the city to facilitate easier flow. The channel is the present course of the river. Justinian also constructed the bridge bearing his name over the new course.

During the early Turkish (pre Ottoman ) times the caravans had to pay a certain customs duty to use the bridge. The word for customs duty was “baç” (sometimes spelled bac) and the bridge was renamed “baç bridge”. According to an essay by a local historian the baç was cancelled during the Ottoman era.

In 1960s a ring road connecting Mersin to Adana was constructed to the south of Tarsus and Baç Bridge was put out of use. After its active service life now the bridge is conserved in the Kuvai Milliye Park of Tarsus It was restored in 1978.

== Construction ==
The bridge is an arch bridge. There are three arches. Presently the width of the river is about 60 metres (200 ft).
