= Beč, Cerknica =

Beč
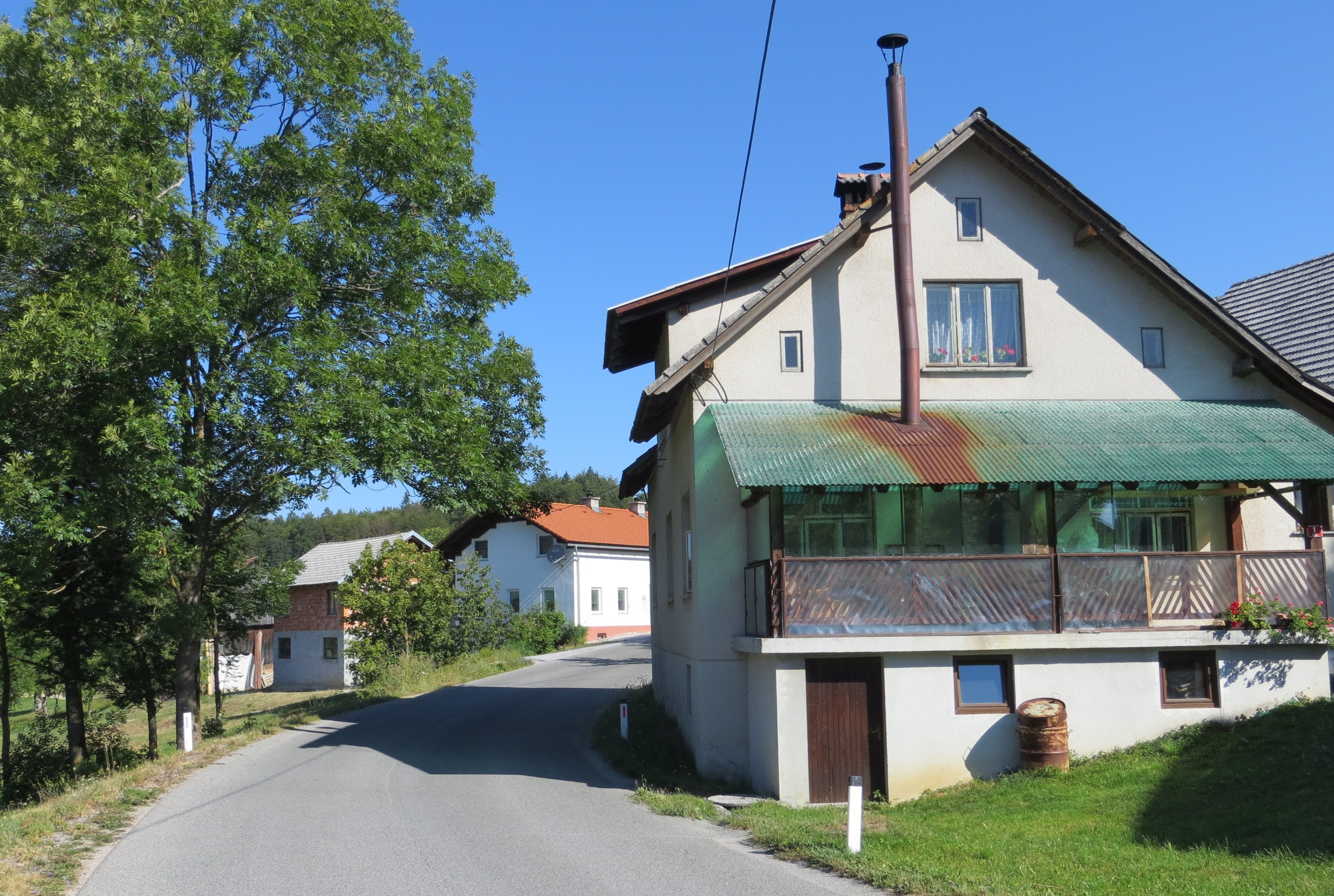

- Location in Slovenia
- Coordinates: 45°51′18.32″N 14°24′58.05″E
- Country: Slovenia
- Traditional region: Inner Carniola
- Statistical region: Littoral–Inner Carniola
- Municipality: Cerknica

Area
  - Total: 0.36 km^{2} (0.14 sq mi)
- Elevation: 807.2 m (2,648 ft)

Population (2020)
  - Total: 10
  - Density: 28/km^{2} (72/sq mi)

Beč (pronounced [ˈbətʃ]) is a small settlement north of Begunje pri Cerknici in the Municipality of Cerknica in the Inner Carniola region of Slovenia.

== Name ==
Beč was attested in written sources as Futsch in 1499. The name Beč is derived from the Slovene common noun beč '(stone- or wood-lined) hollow with a spring' (< *bъťъ), referring to a local geographical feature. The Slavic word *bъťъ was borrowed from Latin buttis 'barrel' and is also the origin of the Slovene toponyms Bač and Buč.
