= Buč =

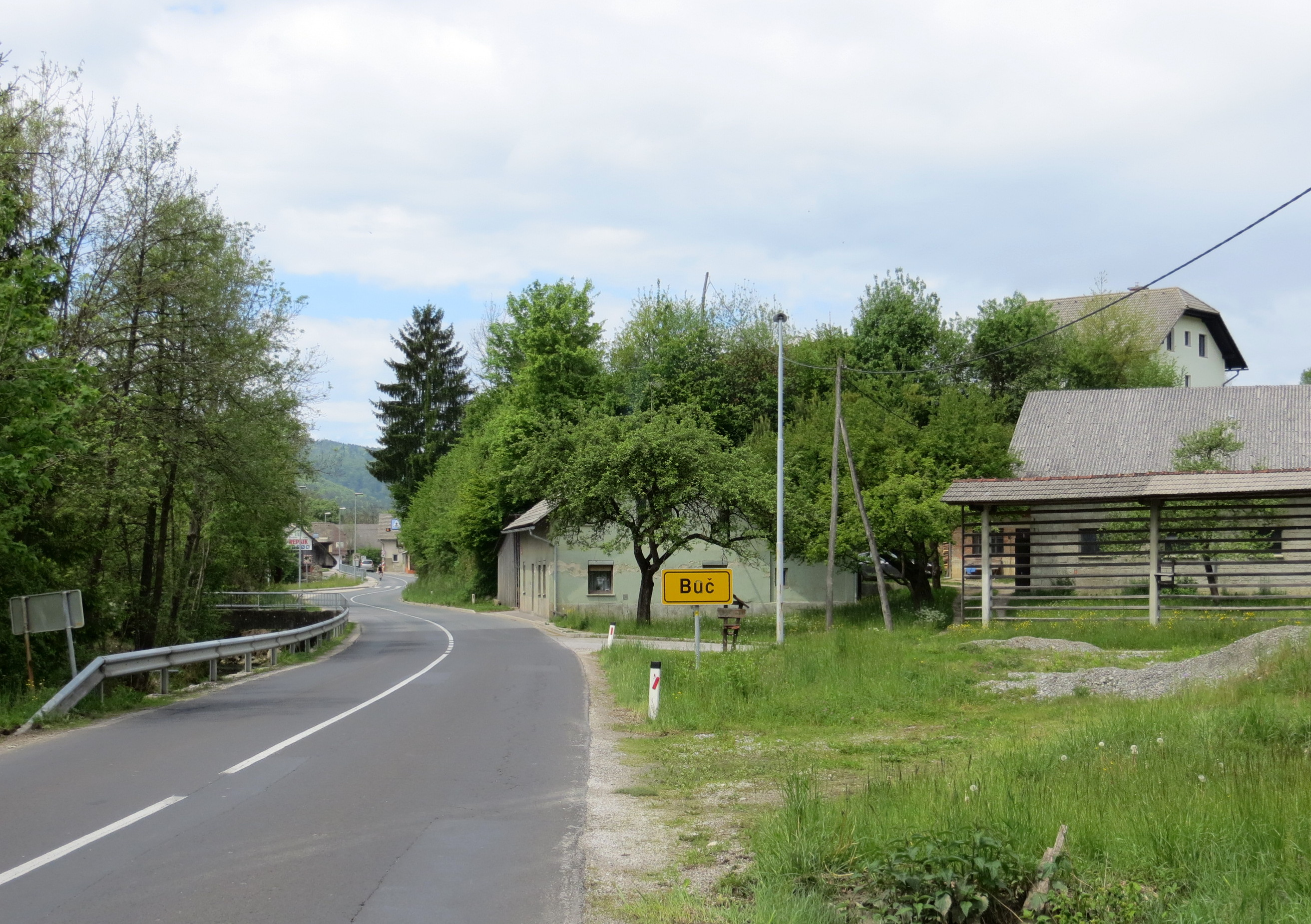

- Location in Slovenia
- Coordinates: 46°12′59.09″N 14°43′18.66″E
- Country: Slovenia
- Traditional region: Upper Carniola
- Statistical region: Central Slovenia
- Municipality: Kamnik
- Elevation: 458.1 m (1,503 ft)

Population (2002)
  - Total: 184

Buč (pronounced [ˈbutʃ]; in older sources also Beč, German: Butsch) is a small settlement on the Nevljica River in the Tuhinj Valley in the Municipality of Kamnik in the Upper Carniola region of Slovenia. It includes the hamlets of Brezovica (German: Bresowitz), Vetrnik, and Smrtna Vas (Slovene: Smrtna vas).

== Name ==
Buč was attested in written sources in 1400 as Futsch (and as Fuczsch in 1444, Zhetsch in 1477, and dorff Watscha in 1495). In the local dialect, the settlement is known as Bəč. The name Buč is related to the Slovene common noun beč '(stone- or wood-lined) hollow with a spring' (< *bъťъ), referring to a local geographical feature. The Slavic word *bъťъ was borrowed from Latin buttis 'barrel' and is also the origin of the Slovene toponyms Beč and Bač. This name form with -u- is based on old attestations and also labialization of the semivowel after initial b-. In the past the German name was Butsch.
