= Benedicta Arts Center =

Performing arts center in St. Joseph, Minnesota, USA

- Interactive map of Benedicta Arts Center
- Address: 37 South College Avenue; St. Joseph, Minnesota; United States
- Coordinates: 45.5597°N 94.3216°W
- Owner: College of Saint Benedict
- Operator: College of Saint Benedict
- Capacity: Escher Auditorium: 974 seats Gorecki Family Theater: 292 seats Coleman Black Box Theater: up to 120 seats
- Type: Performing arts center

Construction
- Opened: 1964
- Architects: Hammel, Green and Abrahamson

Website
- www.csbsju.edu/fine-arts

The Benedicta Arts Center (BAC) is a performing arts center located on the campus of the College of Saint Benedict. Built in 1964 by the Sisters of the Order of Saint Benedict in the city of St. Joseph, MN, the Benedicta Arts Center has remained a powerhouse for the arts in Central Minnesota.

The BAC presents three annual performances by the Minnesota Orchestra and has recently commissioned works by Diavolo and Merce Cunningham Dance Company

The BAC houses the Theater Department, and half of the music and art departments for the College of Saint Benedict/Saint John's University. The building also houses 2 art galleries, a music library and 6 class rooms. The BAC also houses the Arlene Helgeson Dance Studio, the Darnell Amphitheater, the Gold'n'Plump Office Suite, and the Book Arts Studio.

== Escher Auditorium ==
Escher Auditorium functions as both a concert performance hall as well as a 974-seat theater. The back wall of the theater can be raised to reveal a traditional theatrical stage house which is used for dance companies and concerts. The auditorium has 2 balcony levels above the main floor that seat about 100 audience members each. The main stage is equipped with a pair of hydraulic lifts that can also be lowered to pit or house level, allowing space for either an orchestra or additional audience members. The auditorium was previously named Petters Auditorium after Tom Petters gave a large donation for a renovation of the auditorium. After Petters' conviction of running a ponzi scheme in 2009, the College decided to rename the auditorium.

== Gorecki Family Theater ==
The Gorecki Theater shares its stage house with the Escher Auditorium, making it one of the few theaters in the country with this unique design. The space hosts performances of the CSB/SJU theater department in addition to lectures and other performances requiring a smaller venue. It seats 292 patrons and, thanks to a hydraulic elevator and seating system, is capable of featuring both Proscenium and Thrust performances.

== Notable performers ==
These performers have appeared on either the Gorecki Stage or in the Escher Auditorium:

- Cherish the Ladies (2007)
- Bela Fleck & Abigail Washburn (2015)
- In the Heart of the Beast Puppet and Mask Theater (2006)
- Keb' Mo' (2012)
- Kronos Quartet (2006)
- Ladysmith Black Mambazo (2007)
- Luna Negra Dance Theater (2006)
- Mark Morris Dance Group (2005)
- Kathy Mattea
- Natalie MacMaster (2011)
- Merce Cunningham Dance Company (2007, 2005)
- Edgar Meyer (2008)
- Murray Louis Dance Company (1971)
- Michael Moschen 2006
- National Shakespeare Company (1971)
- Preservation Hall Jazz Band (2007)
- Dianne Reeves 2006
- The Seán Curran Company (2008)
- Ricky Skaggs & Kentucky Thunder (2011)
- Soweto Gospel Choir (2014)
- Urban Bush Women (2008)
