= Bangladesh Accreditation Council =

Education accreditation organization in Bangladesh

- BAC logo

Agency overview
- Formed: 2017
- Jurisdiction: Government of Bangladesh
- Headquarters: BSL Office Complex, Building-2 (2nd Floor), 1 Minto Road, Dhaka-1000, Bangladesh
- Motto: Sustainable Socioeconomic Development through Excellence in Higher Education
- Agency executive: Mesbahuddin Ahmed, Chairman
- Parent department: Ministry of Education
- Website: bac.gov.bd

Bangladesh Accreditation Council (BAC) (Bengali: বাংলাদেশ অ্যাক্রেডিটেশন কাউন্সিল) is an autonomous government agency responsible for the accreditation of higher education institutes and academic-program-offering entities for quality assurance, leading to international recognition.

== History ==
The council is established under the Bangladesh Accreditation Council Act, 2017, which was passed by the Jatiya Sangsad (National Parliament) in March 2017. Mesbahuddin Ahmed was appointed the first chairman of the council in August 2018. Education minister Dipu Moni inaugurated the office of Bangladesh Accreditation Council at Mohakhali in May 2019. The appointment of four full-time members of the council was completed in June 2019. The first council meeting was held at the BAC office, Mohakhali on 22 December 2019.

== Objectives ==
- Facilitate the implementation of quality assurance mechanism and national qualifications framework at the higher education institution (HEI) and program levels.
- Provide standards, guidelines and code of best practice to the higher education institutions (HEIs) for self-assessment and developing internal quality assurance culture.
- Provide advisory services to the HEIs or program offering entities to prepare them for accreditation;
- Facilitate the adoption of quality assurance standards by the HEIs and program offering entities.
- Conduct external quality assessment of HEIs and academic programs and provide feedback for further improvement and accreditation.
- Conduct training, workshop, conference to motivate the higher education community towards accreditation and capacity building.
- Conduct or commission research on quality assurance and appropriateness of the standards in higher education.
- Maintain liaison and cooperation with credible international quality assurance networks and accreditation bodies in higher education.
