= Beijing Arbitration Commission =

Non-profit organization

- Founded: 1995
- Type: Legal/ADR services
- Location: 7/F, China Merchants Tower, No/ 118 Jianguo Road, Chaoyang District, Beijing, China
- Website: bjac.org.cn

The Beijing Arbitration Commission (BAC) (Chinese: 北京仲裁委员会; pinyin: Běijīng zhòngcái wěiyuánhuì) is an independent non-profit organization based in Beijing offering services in arbitration, mediation, and other dispute resolution mechanisms. The BAC was established in 1995 following the passage of the Arbitration Law of the People's Republic of China. In accordance with the theories of other ADR channels, the BAC encourages arbitration and mediation forums as "win-win" alternatives to litigation. The BAC serves both domestic and international clients. An article in Business China declared the Beijing Arbitration Commission (BAC) as "the only local arbitration commission which meets or surpasses global standards.”

Any contract containing the following model arbitration clause is referred to the BAC:

"All disputes arising from or in connection with this contract shall be submitted to the Beijing Arbitration Commission for arbitration in accordance with its rules of arbitration in effect at the time of applying for arbitration. The arbitral award is final and binding upon both parties."

The BAC's caseload has seen a dramatic increase since its founding over a decade ago. In 2009, the BAC concluded 1,981 cases involving over 8.8 billion Yuan in dispute.

== History ==
The Beijing Arbitration Commission (BAC) was founded on September 28, 1995, as one of seven pilot local arbitration commissions (LACs) established under the Arbitration Law of the People's Republic of China. The Arbitration Law reformed China's arbitration organizations and applied international arbitration practices in China. The Arbitration Law delegated the establishment of the BAC to the Office of Legislative Affairs of the Beijing Municipal Government (BMG). Ms. Hongsong Wang, then a research fellow in the Legal Affairs Office of the BMG and current Secretary-General of the BAC, took charge of this task.

BAC's annual caseload continues to increase rapidly, as does its compilation of international arbitration cases.

== Organization ==
BAC headquarters is located in the Central Business District (CBD) of Beijing. The office includes multiple international arbitration halls equipped with simultaneous translation systems and videoconferencing for oral hearings or international seminars. The BAC Committee — the BAC's governing body — is composed of one Chairman, four Vice-Chairpersons, and ten Committee Members. Many of the previous and current Vice-Chairpersons and Members are experienced specialists in law, economics, and trade. The Members' responsibilities include formulating and revising the BAC's Constitution and rules, creating a Panel of Arbitrators, and selecting and dismissing arbitrators. In pursuit of fair and unbiased arbitrations, the Commission does not participate in specific arbitral proceedings. The Arbitral Tribunal, a body of arbitrators independent of the Commission, alone determines awards of specific cases. The Commission's involvement only occurs when an arbitral tribunal makes technical and major substantive errors. The Commission members' participation with the organization is pro bono work, as they are unpaid.

=== Secretariat ===
==== Secretarial qualifications ====
The Office of the BAC and its Secretariat manage cases and other day-to-day affairs. The majority of the Secretariat hold master's degrees from renowned universities and many are multilingual, offering convenient services for parties who speak Chinese, English, Korean, or Japanese. New recruits undergo an intensive training program. The Secretariat oversees arbitral tribunals in the case of technical or typographical errors, miscalculations, failures to include matters decided during the arbitration in the award, or decisions inconsistent with how the same dispute was decided in a previous case. Case managers use a comprehensive, computerized case-management system that monitors the entire arbitration procedure, contains a searchable arbitrator database, and allows parties to submit post-arbitration feedback. Parties may use the inquiry system to search arbitration rules and other laws or pull up information regarding a specific arbitrator's background, case data, or feedback.

=== Arbitrators ===
==== Expertise ====
The Arbitration Law requires that domestic arbitration cases be conducted by arbitrators appointed from the BAC's Panel of Arbitrators. The BAC's Panel of Arbitrators consists of over 270 arbitrators from China and around the world, all highly regarded in their respective legal or trade fields of expertise. Arbitrators selected by the Commission for inclusion on the Panel must meet the qualifications set out in Article 13 of the Arbitration Law. Those hoping to join the BAC as an arbitrator must have some knowledge or practical experience in the legal field as a lawyer or engaged in legal education or research.

==== Training ====
Before an arbitrator joins the BAC, the organization requires its arbitrators to pass a professional training course. All arbitral candidates for the BAC Panel of Arbitrators must successfully complete a training course administered by the BAC and the Law School of Tsinghua University, as well as an examination. The training process for arbitrators differs depending on the type of cases the arbitrator will be handling (i.e. purchase, construction, finance, engineering, leases). The Panel of Arbitrators includes arbitrators of Chinese and non-Chinese nationality, including American, Australian, Belgian, British, Canadian, Colombian, French, German, Italian, Korean, Singaporean, Swedish, and Swiss arbitrators. The BAC also permits parties in international arbitrations— including parties from Hong Kong, Macau, and Taiwan— to select arbitrators from outside the Panel. These selections must include the arbitrator's résumé and contact information.

==== Case-specific performance ====
The number of arbitrators used in an arbitration hearing depends on the character of the proceeding.

A Common Procedure case is heard before a presiding arbitrator and two co-arbitrators, creating a three-person Arbitral Tribunal. Each party selects their own arbitrator from the Panel of Arbitrators and submits a list of one to three choices for presiding arbitrator. If only one of the choices from each party's list overlaps, that arbitrator becomes the presiding arbitrator. If more than one candidate between the two lists overlaps, the Chairman of the BAC decides among the overlapping candidates. If the lists contain no overlapping candidates, the Chairman selects a presiding arbitrator outside of both lists. The Arbitral Tribunal's decision is based on majority opinion. Every member of the Arbitral Tribunal has an equal vote. If no majority opinion is reached, the final decision will be made by the presiding arbitrator.

A Summary Procedure case (a case involving a disputed amount of one million Yuan or less) occurs before an Arbitral Tribunal composed of a sole arbitrator. The arbitrator is jointly appointed by the parties. If the parties cannot agree on an arbitrator, the Chairman makes the selection. In cases where the amount in dispute is one million Yuan or less, the parties may jointly select to follow the Common Procedure and the added financial cost it entails.

== Independence, impartiality, and efficiency ==
The Arbitration Law provides that arbitration and arbitration commissions should be independent and free from interference by administration organs, public organizations, or individuals. While the government played an instrumental role in the founding and initial organization of the BAC, and the BMG appoints BAC personnel, the organization is effectively independent. Today, the appointment of personnel by the BMG functions as a formality. First, the stringent qualifications required for personnel set out in the Arbitration Law limits the BMG's discretion in appointing personnel. Only specified departments and organizations may recommend candidates and the BMG never vetoes the recommendations. Second, the Chairman or the Vice-Chairman by designation may hold meetings of the Commission only if two-thirds of the Members are present. Any revisions of the BAC Constitution or dissolution of the BAC require the approval of more than two-thirds of the Commission Members. Other resolutions require the approval of more than two-thirds of the Commission Members present at the meeting. The decision-making process minimizes the ability of a government-appointed Commission Members from compromising the Commission's independence. Third, the BAC achieved financial independence from the government in 1998 and currently operates as a public institution "managed as an enterprise." Within the first three years after its creation, the BAC's caseload increased dramatically, providing the BAC with a stable source of funding from arbitration fees. The BAC has been self-funded since 2002. Fourth, the BMG has taken a "hands-off approach" in its strong support of the BAC. The BMG's involvement is limited to providing the BAC with necessary financial assistance, allowing the BAC to operate independently.

The BAC was the first in China to require its arbitrators to sign a statement declaring their ability to maintain fairness and independence. The BAC also enacted a Code of Ethical Standards for its arbitrators, which includes the disclosure of any connections an arbitrator may have to the arbitrating parties.

Each arbitration institution formulates its own set of procedural rules and the BAC's Arbitration Rules proved visionary for its time. They were the first in China to require individual dissenting opinions from arbitrators who do not sign the award and also the first to allow the parties to play a leading role in selecting a presiding arbitrator. The BAC amended its Rules to prevent BAC arbitrators from participating as advocates or representatives in any other cases before the BAC. According to Article 9 of the BAC's Ethical Standards, "[a]n arbitrator should not act as a representative in any case accepted by the BAC, including the case to which the arbitral award is applied for setting aside or for disallowing, nor should the arbitrator inquire about the case hearing or provide any entertainment, gift or other benefit to the member(s) of the arbitral tribunal for others." Arbitrators must disclose any information that may compromise their impartiality. In addition, upon concluding a hearing, arbitrators must sign a declaration affirming their impartiality and their diligence in conducting the proceedings.

Parties may challenge the impartiality of an arbitrator. Reasons for challenging an arbitrator include: (1) the arbitrator is a party to the arbitration or a close relative to a party to the arbitration; (2) the arbitrator has a personal interest in the dispute; (3) the arbitrator has any type of relationship which can affect his impartiality; or (4) the arbitrator privately met with a party or accepted offers of entertainment or a gift from the party or an authorized representative of the party. A challenge to an arbitrator should be made in writing and include supporting evidence. A challenge must be made before the first hearing; grounds for a challenge arising any time after the initial hearing must be brought before the final hearing. The secretary of the Arbitral Tribunal will distribute the party's challenge to the other party and to the Tribunal members. If the other party agrees to the challenge, the arbitrator must step down. If the other party does not agree to the challenge or the arbitrator does not voluntarily step down, the Chairman decides on the challenge. The Chairman's decision is binding on the arbitrator and the parties.

The average duration for the arbitral process from beginning to end is less than 70 days.

== Publications ==
The Beijing Arbitration Journal, started in 1995 by the BAC, is co-edited by the BAC, the China Association of Private International Law, and the Wuhan University Research Institute of International Law. The BAC has also started arbitration forums in publications such as the People's Court Daily and the Legal Daily to raise awareness about arbitration.
