= Big Apple Chorus =

Chorus based in Manhattan, New York

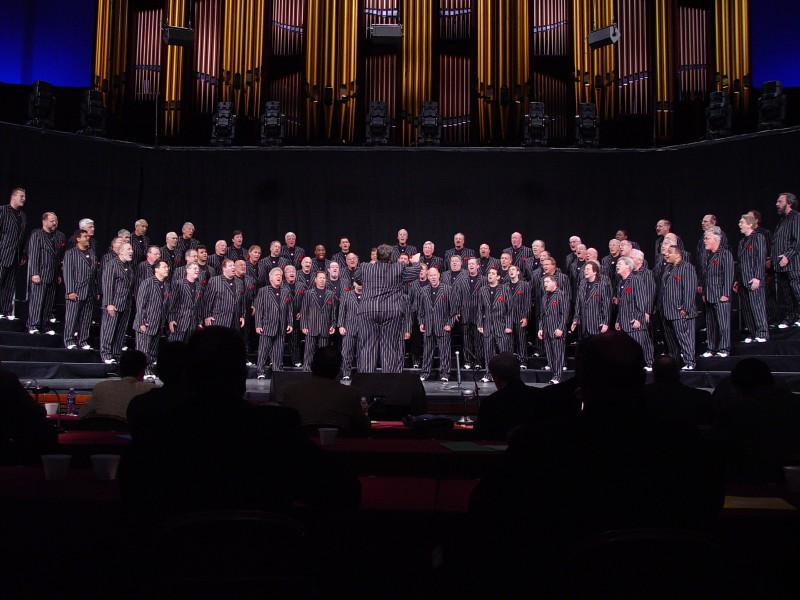
The Big Apple Chorus, 2005

The Big Apple Chorus is a barbershop chorus based in Manhattan, New York. The chorus, directed by Jack Pinto, was founded in 1983 and has close to 100 members. The Big Apple Chorus has competed in the Barbershop Harmony Society's international chorus competition, with a best finish of 2nd in 1987.

For several years, the chorus has regularly participated in the holiday concert series at the South Street Seaport, including the Living Christmas Tree—a group of carolers arranged in a tree, accompanying the first public Christmas tree in the city to be lit during the winter holiday season.

The chorus rehearses at 7pm on Monday nights at Norman Thomas High School, 111 East 33rd Street in Manhattan.

The group's 1997 album, Manhattan Skyline Barbershop Harmony, received a three-star rating from AllMusic.
