= Law enforcement in Cape Verde =

Law enforcement in Cape Verde is carried out by the Judicial Police or National Police.

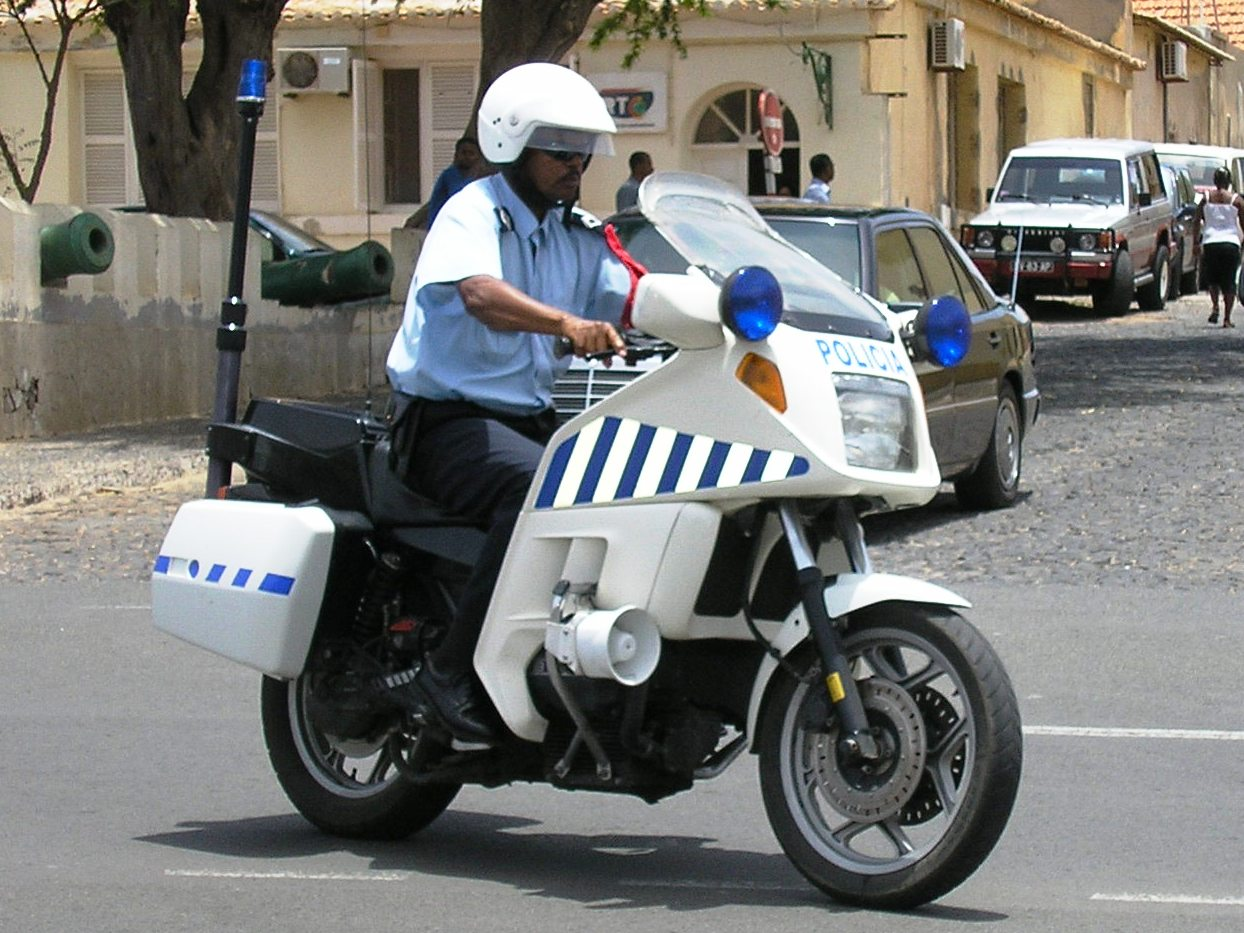
A police motorcycle of the National Police

The captain of the Armed Forces, Abailardo Barbosa Amado, was the first Executive Director of the PJ. The period that followed the creation of legal PJ was tapped to be selected by public tender, the tables, after specific training in criminal investigation techniques and lofoscópicas the country and in Portugal, conducted by the Institute of Judicial and Police Science criminal, would be included in the categories of technical professionals Lofoscopia, Agent, Inspector and Inspectors of the PJ framework.

== History ==
=== Early police force ===
The first police force was created in 1872 and was named the Corpo de Polícia Civil made by the governor Caetano Albuquerque. The police force was organized as part of the Civil Police of the Portuguese Main. Its headquarters was in Praia.

In 1880, the Police Corps was restructured and became the Police Company with a military based organization; the Company was based in Praia and had another station in Mindelo.

In 1962, a new police organization was formed in Cape Verde and transformed into Polícia de Segurança Pública (PSP) of Cape Verde with a newly civil character, modeled after the Polícia de Segurança Pública (Public Security Police) of Portugal.

After Cape Verde became independent in 1975, it became the Polícia de Ordem Pública (Public Order Police, or POP), whose uniforms and colors were different from those of the Portuguese.

Due to its historic relations, several of the officers were trained in Portugal, and the POP continued to maintain close links with the PSP, such as organization and uniforms.

=== Modern police force ===
The current police force was created in May 1993. Since November 14, 2005, it is called the National Police (Policia Nacional).

The first training course was held in 1994 and agents of the Judicial Police attended and completed by 3 and 20 candidates respectively.

According to Interpol, Cape Verde has two parallel police forces. The Judicial Police is under the authority of the Ministry of Justice, while the National Police is under the authority of the Interior Ministry.

In Cape Verde there are 1,947 law enforcement officers of which 13% are women as of April, 2012.

== Organization ==
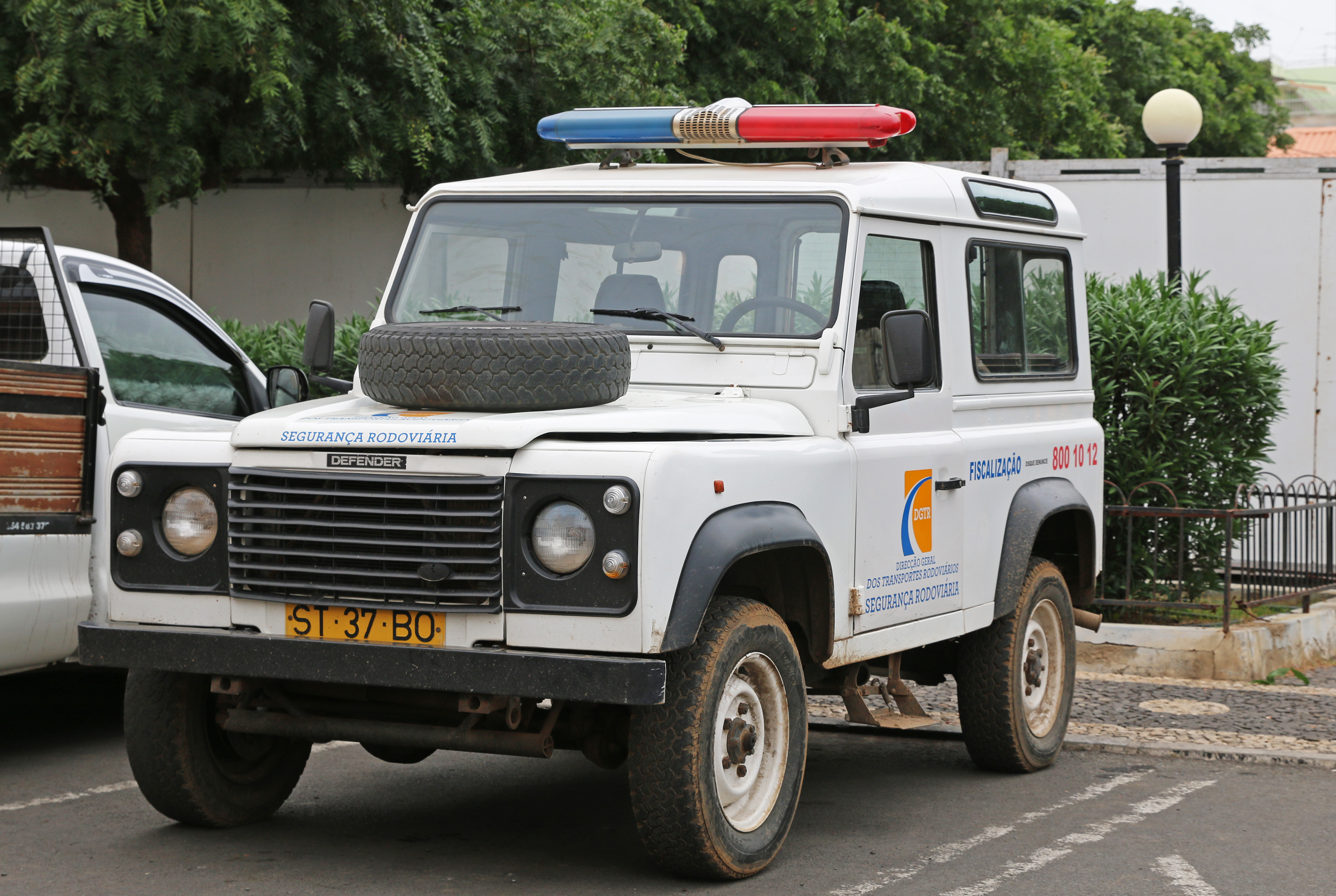
A Land Rover Defender used as a police car in Praia

The National Police includes the National Direction, Special Command Units, Regional Commands (Praia, São Vicente, Santa Catarina, Sal, Fogo and Santo Antão), Police Squad and Police Post, Police School, and Social Services.

According to Interpol The National Police has four sub-commands: the Public Order Police, the Border Police, the Customs Police, and the Maritime Police.

=== Brigada Anticrime ===
The Brigada Anticrime (BAC) is the police tactical unit of Cape Verde. BAC is often deployed during the night in high crime areas, or as part of rescue operations. They are equipped with bulletproof vests, pepper spray, tasers, helmets, long guns, and armored vehicles.

== See also ==
- Crime in Cape Verde
- Cape Verdean Armed Forces
