= Balochistan Arts Council =

Arts centre in Quetta, Pakistan

Balochistan Arts Council (Balochi: شورای هنری بلوچستان) is an arts centre and cultural exhibition centre in Quetta, Pakistan. In March 2013 Baloch Culture Day was held at this venue.
