= Baccalaureate =

Baccalaureate may refer to:

- Baccalauréat, a French national academic qualification
- Bachelor's degree, or baccalaureate, an undergraduate academic degree
- English Baccalaureate, a performance measure to assess secondary schools in England
- European Baccalaureate, a bilingual educational diploma, awarded by a European School
- French-German Baccalaureate, a secondary school diploma awarded by Deutsch-Französisches Gymnasium
- International Baccalaureate, a non-profit foundation
  - IB Diploma Programme
- Romanian Baccalaureate, Romania's national secondary-school diploma
- Spanish Baccalaureate, the post-16 stage of education in Spain
- Tunisian Baccalaureate, a national examination in Tunisia
- Welsh Baccalaureate Qualification, an educational qualification in secondary schools and colleges across Wales

== See also ==
- Baccalaureate service, a Christian celebration that honors a graduating class
