= People's Court Daily =

Simplified Chinese newspaper

People's Court Daily (Chinese: 人民法院报; pinyin: Rénmín Fǎyuàn Bào) is a daily newspaper in China owned by the PRC Supreme People's Court. It was established on 1 October 1992, and is headquartered in Beijing.
