= Báč =

Báč Bacsfa
- Municipality
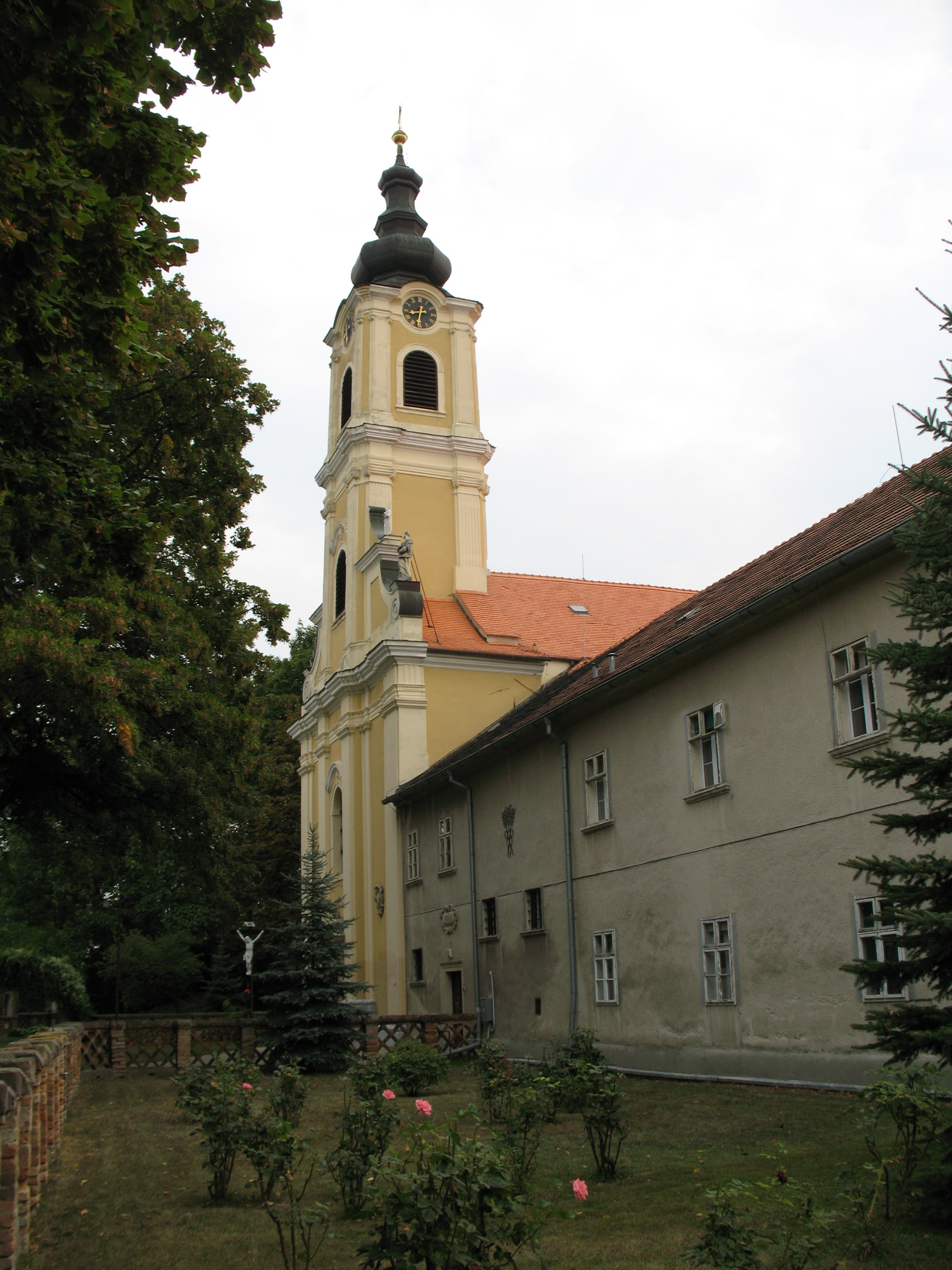

- Flag

- Location of Báč in the Trnava Region Location of Báč in Slovakia
- Coordinates: 48.00°N 17.38°E
- Country: Slovakia
- Region: Trnava Region
- District: Dunajská Streda District
- First mentioned: 1319

Government
  - Mayor: Ildikó Duducz

Area
  - Total: 3.92 km^{2} (1.51 sq mi)
- Elevation: 123 m (404 ft)

Population (2025)
  - Total: 558
- Time zone: UTC+1 (CET)
  - Summer (DST): UTC+2 (CEST)
- Postal code: 931 01
- Area code: +421 31
- Vehicle registration plate (until 2022): DS
- Website: www.obecbac.sk

Báč (Hungarian: Bacsfa, pronounced [ˈbɒtʃfɒ]) is a village and municipality in the Dunajská Streda District of the Trnava Region in south-west Slovakia.

== History ==
In the 9th century, the territory of Báč became part of the Kingdom of Hungary. In historical records the village was first mentioned in 1319. After the Austro-Hungarian army disintegrated in November 1918, Czechoslovak troops occupied the area, later acknowledged internationally by the Treaty of Trianon. Between 1938 and 1945 Báč once more became part of Miklós Horthy's Hungary through the First Vienna Award. From 1945 until the Velvet Divorce, it was part of Czechoslovakia. Since then it has been part of Slovakia.

== Geography ==
The municipality lies at an altitude of 123 metres (404 ft) and covers an area of 3.92 km^{2} (1.51 sq mi) (2025).

== Population ==
Population statistic (10 years)
Year	1995	2005	2015	2025
Count	574	536	558	558
Difference		−6.62%	+4.10%	+0%

Population statistic
Year	2024	2025
Count	553	558
Difference		+0.90%

It has a population of 558 people (31 December 2025).

=== Ethnicity ===
Census 2021 (1+ %)
Ethnicity	Number	Fraction
Hungarian	409	74.9%
Slovak	151	27.65%
Not found out	19	3.47%
Total	546	

In year 2021 was 546 people by ethnicity 409 as Hungarian, 151 as Slovak, 19 as Not found out, 3 as Czech and 2 as Serbian.

Note on population: The difference values of population numbers in the table "Population statistic" and in the sections "Ethnicity" & "Religion" is caused by the use of various statistical methods.

=== Religion ===
Census 2021 (1+ %)
Religion	Number	Fraction
Roman Catholic Church	430	78.75%
None	74	13.55%
Calvinist Church	15	2.75%
Not found out	11	2.01%
Evangelical Church	9	1.65%
Total	546	

In year 2021 was 546 people by religion 430 from Roman Catholic Church, 74 from None, 15 from Calvinist Church, 11 from Not found out, 9 from Evangelical Church, 2 from Christian Congregations in Slovakia, 1 from Old Catholic Church, 1 from Eastern Orthodox Church, 1 from Other, 1 from Greek Catholic Church and 1 from Buddhism.

== Genealogical resources ==
The records for genealogical research are available at the state archive in Bratislava (Slovak: Štátny archív v Bratislave)

- Roman Catholic church records (births/marriages/deaths): 1802-1896 (parish A)
- Lutheran church records (births/marriages/deaths): 1706-1709, 1783-1895 (parish B)
- Reformated church records (births/marriages/deaths): 1783-1895 (parish B)
- Census records 1869 of Bac are not available at the state archive.

== See also ==
- List of municipalities and towns in Slovakia
