= HP Business Service Management =

- Developer(s): Hewlett-Packard, HP Software Division
- Stable release: 9.26
- Operating system: Windows, Linux
- Type: application performance and availability, business service management software tools
- License: Proprietary
- Website: HP Business Service Management Home Page

HP Business Service Management (BSM) is an end-to-end management software tool that integrates network, server, application and business transaction monitoring. HP Business Service Management is developed and marketed by the HP Software Division.

HP introduced HP Business Service Management 9.0 as a common single platform for managing complex applications, including those supported by both private and public cloud computing, outsourced IT, software-as-a-service (Saas) and traditional IT service delivery. The 9.0 release was made generally available in June 2010 and was part of a portfolio of applications developed by HP to aid businesses and government organizations with the management of cloud computing as well as traditional IT service delivery.

Business service management is an area of Information Technology that focuses on management of software tools, methods and processes that help the IT department manage technology in a way that supports the business through the services they provide. The BSM methodology connects key IT components to the goals of the business so that the IT department can forecast how technology will affect the business and how business will impact the IT infrastructure.

== Components ==
HP Business Service Management includes operations intelligence, operations bridge, application performance management, systems and virtualization management, network management and storage management.

== See also ==
- Business service management
- Cloud computing
- Software as a service
