= Bač, Ilirska Bistrica =

Bač
- Location in Slovenia
- Coordinates: 45°37′55.15″N 14°15′26.67″E
- Country: Slovenia
- Traditional region: Inner Carniola
- Statistical region: Littoral–Inner Carniola
- Municipality: Ilirska Bistrica

Area
  - Total: 26.61 km^{2} (10.27 sq mi)
- Elevation: 579.7 m (1,902 ft)

Population (2002)
  - Total: 462

Bač (pronounced [ˈbatʃ]; German: Batsch, Italian: Baccia) is a village northeast of Knežak in the Municipality of Ilirska Bistrica in the Inner Carniola region of Slovenia.

== Name ==
The name Bač is related to the Slovene common noun beč '(stone- or wood-lined) hollow with a spring' (< *bъťъ), referring to a local geographical feature. The Slavic word *bъťъ was borrowed from Latin buttis 'barrel' and is also the origin of the Slovene toponyms Beč and Buč.

== Kalec Castle ==
The ruins of Kalec Castle (also Na Kalcu; German: Steinberg or Stemberg) stand northwest of Bač near the sources of the Pivka River. The castle was built in 1620, and a cylindrical tower and walled courtyard were later added. The property was owned by the Wilicher (Slovene: Vilhar) family. The tower was restored in 1939, and the rest of the structure is in ruins.

== Church ==
The local church in the settlement is dedicated to Saint Anne and belongs to the Parish of Knežak.
