= Bač, North Macedonia =

Bač Бач
- Village
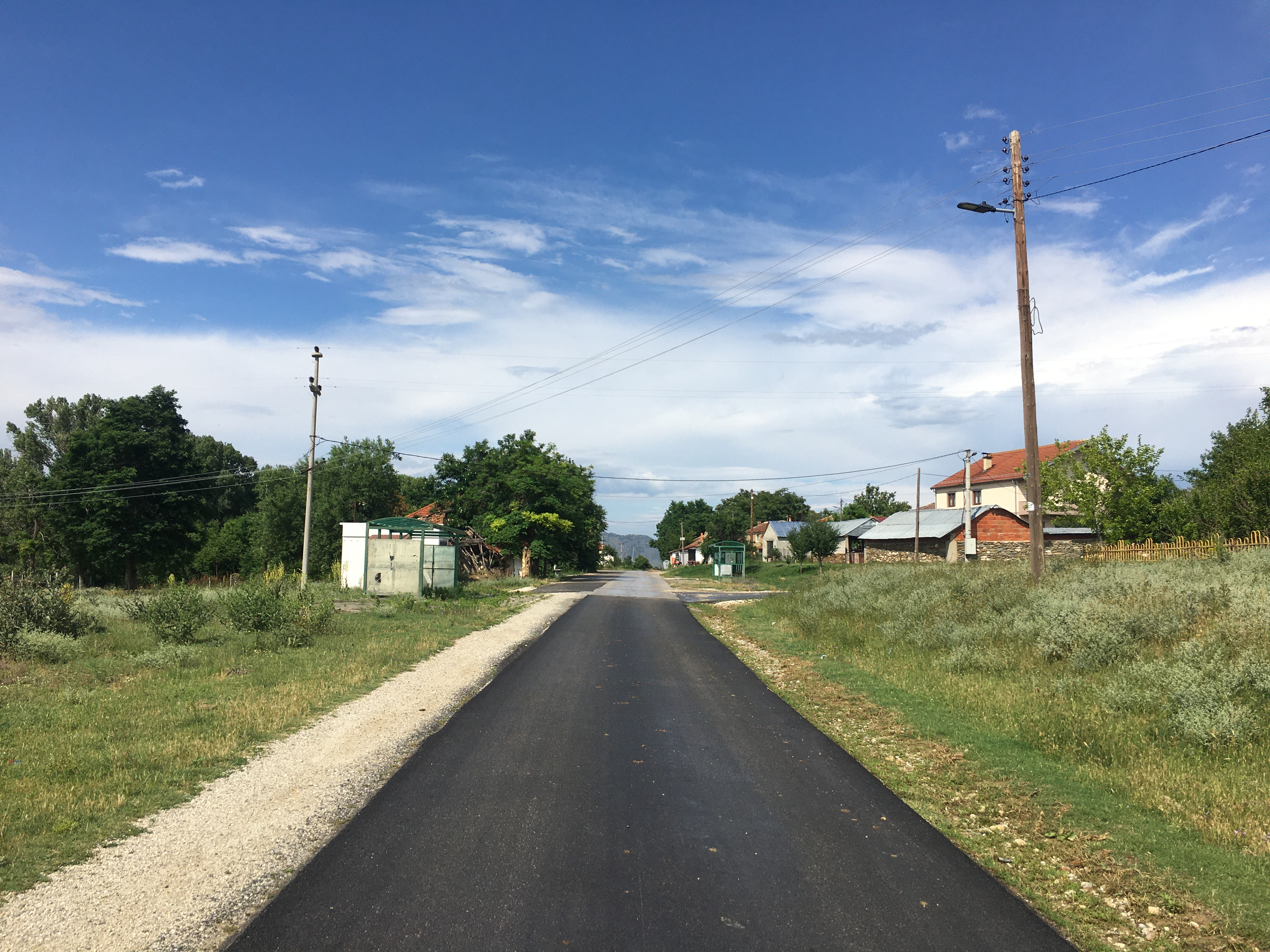
- Regional road R2338 in the village

- Location within North Macedonia
- Country: North Macedonia
- Region: Pelagonia
- Municipality: Novaci

Population (2002)
  - Total: 172
- Time zone: UTC+1 (CET)
  - Summer (DST): UTC+2 (CEST)
- Website: .

Bač (Macedonian: Бач) is a village and a former municipality in the southern part of North Macedonia. By the 2003 territorial division of the country, the rural municipality of Bač was attached to Novaci Municipality.

== Demographics ==
According to the 2002 census, the village had a total of 172 inhabitants. Ethnic groups in the village include:

- Macedonians 171
- Serbs 1
