= WBAC =

Radio station in Tennessee, United States

- Cleveland, Tennessee; United States
- Frequency: 1340 kHz

Ownership
- Owner: East Tennessee Radio Group Iii,

Technical information
- Licensing authority: FCC
- Facility ID: 66955
- Class: C
- Power: 1,000 watts unlimited
- Transmitter coordinates: 35°9′54″N 84°51′13″W

Links
- Public license information: Public file; LMS

WBAC (1340 AM) is a radio station licensed to Cleveland, Tennessee, United States. The station is owned by East Tennessee Radio Group Iii, .
