= Jenna Johnson =

American professional dancer (born 1994)

- Born: Jenna Michelle Johnson; April 12, 1994 (age 32); Los Angeles, California, U.S.
- Other name: Jenna Johnson Chmerkovskiy
- Education: Timpview High School
- Occupations: Dancer; choreographer
- Years active: 2013–present
- Spouse: Valentin Chmerkovskiy (m. 2019)
- Children: 1
- Relatives: Maksim Chmerkovskiy (brother-in-law); Peta Murgatroyd (sister-in-law); Hailey Bills (niece)

Jenna Michelle Johnson Chmerkovskiy (née Johnson; born April 12, 1994) is an American professional Latin and ballroom dancer and choreographer. Born in California and raised in Utah, she was a contestant during the tenth season of the reality competition series So You Think You Can Dance.

Johnson then joined Dancing with the Stars as a member of the troupe, and was promoted to pro in 2016. She won the Athletes season with Olympic figure skater Adam Rippon and season 33 with The Bachelor star Joey Graziadei. Johnson received a Primetime Emmy Award nomination for her work with her husband, Valentin Chmerkovskiy, on the series.

== Early life ==
Jenna Michelle Johnson was born on April 12, 1994, in Los Angeles, California, to Curt and Tamara "Tammy" Johnson. She was raised in Provo, Utah, with her two older sisters Stacy and Jill, who are also dancers and previous contestants on the reality competition series So You Think You Can Dance (SYTYCD).

Johnson was always interested in performing and was enrolled in dance classes at a very early age. She is trained in jazz, contemporary, and Latin ballroom. Johnson idolized her eldest sister Stacy, who was the director of Center Stage Performing Arts Studio in Orem. When she was old enough to join Center Stage's senior company, her sisters became "instrumental" to her progress. She graduated from Timpview High School in 2013.

== Career ==
In dancesport, Johnson is a five-time U.S. National Latin Champion, U.S. National Youth 10 Dance Champion, as well as a three-time National Contemporary Winner. She represented the United States at the World Latin Dance Champions in 2012.

=== So You Think You Can Dance ===
Johnson auditioned for SYTYCD in Memphis, Tennessee, and was named a contestant for season 10. She was paired with contemporary contestant Tucker Knox and was eliminated on August 20, 2013, in the quarter-finals. During So You Think You Can Dance: The Next Generation, Johnson served as ballroom dancer Jake Monreal's all-star mentor. They were eliminated on August 1, 2016, in week 3. Johnson then mentored Latin ballroom contestant Chris "Kiki" Nyemchek for season 14.

=== Dancing with the Stars ===
Johnson was a troupe member on Dancing with the Stars from season 18 to season 22. She became a professional dancer on season 23 and was partnered with actor Jake T. Austin. They were the first couple eliminated on September 20, 2016, finishing in 13th place. Johnson danced with racing driver James Hinchcliffe on Halloween Night and Showstoppers Night after his partner, Sharna Burgess, sustained a knee injury. Johnson was also the couple's trio partner during the semi-finals.

After taking season 24 off, Johnson returned in season 25 as a troupe member. She was promoted to pro for a second time on the Athletes season and was paired with Olympic figure skater Adam Rippon. They won the competition on May 21, 2018, marking Johnson's first Mirrorball Trophy. She is one of the only pros to win in her second season, and the fourth pro to win after being eliminated first in her previous season.

For season 27, Johnson was paired with television personality Joe Amabile. Despite continually receiving low scores and criticism from the judges, the pair was consistently saved by the viewers' votes. They ultimately reached the semifinals and were eliminated alongside Fuller House actor Juan Pablo Di Pace and Cheryl Burke on November 12, 2018, finishing in sixth place. For season 28, Johnson was partnered with Queer Eye star Karamo Brown. They were eliminated during the seventh week of competition on October 28, 2019, finishing in eighth place.

For season 29, Johnson was paired with Catfish host Nev Schulman. They reached the finale and finished as the runner-ups on November 30, 2020, behind The Bachelorette star Kaitlyn Bristowe and Artem Chigvintsev. For season 30, Johnson was paired with YouTube personality JoJo Siwa, marking the first same-sex couple in the show's history. They also reached the finale and finished as the runner-ups on November 22, 2021, behind NBA shooting guard Iman Shumpert and Daniella Karagach.

Johnson returned for season 32 and was paired with supermodel Tyson Beckford. They were eliminated during the third week of competition on October 10, 2023, finishing in twelfth place. Johnson and her husband Valentin Chmerkovskiy earned a nomination for the Primetime Emmy Award for Outstanding Choreography for composing two waltz routines during the season. The first was a tribute performance set to "Moon River" in honor of head judge Len Goodman, who died five months before the season premiered. The second was set to "La Vie En Rose", which Chmerkovskiy performed with his partner Xochitl Gomez during the semifinals.

For season 33, Johnson was partnered with The Bachelor star Joey Graziadei. They won the competition on November 26, 2024, marking Johnson's second Mirrorball Trophy and the first in a standard full-length season.

For season 34, Johnson was partnered with singer and actor Corey Feldman. They were eliminated during the second week of competition on September 23, 2025, in a double elimination alongside Baron Davis and Britt Stewart. Both couples finished in fourteenth place; Johnson's lowest placement to date.

For season 35, Johnson was partnered with actor and dancer Harry Shum Jr. They consistently were at or near the top of the leaderboard until their elimination during the semifinals in the tenth week of competition on November 17, 2026.

Johnson has made appearances on two Dancing with the Stars spin-off shows. She was a mentor during the premiere episode of Dancing with the Stars: Juniors on October 7, 2018. She also appeared as a guest judge and mentor on the episode of Dancing with the Stars: The Next Pro that aired on August 3, 2026.

Season	Partner	Place	Average
23	Jake T. Austin	13th	17.3*
26	Adam Rippon	1st	27.7
27	Joe Amabile	5th	19.5
28	Karamo Brown	8th	21.0
29	Nev Schulman	2nd	26.5
30	JoJo Siwa	2nd	27.7*
32	Tyson Beckford	12th	15.0
33	Joey Graziadei	1st	26.8
34	Corey Feldman	14th	14.3
35	Harry Shum Jr.	6th	26.5

- The average has been adjusted to be out of 30, not 40.

==== Season 23 ====
With celebrity partner Jake T. Austin

Week #	Dance	Song	Judges' score				Total	Result
Week #	Dance	Song	Inaba	Goodman	J. Hough	Tonioli	Total	Result
1	Jive	"Kiss You" — One Direction	5	6	5	6	22	No Elimination
2	Cha-cha-cha	"Go, Diego, Go! Theme" — George Noriega & Joel Someillan	6	6	6	6	24	Eliminated

Because of an injury to Sharna Burgess, Johnson returned to the show as the substitute partner for the IndyCar driver in Weeks 8 and 9, replacing Burgess. The scores listed reflect her weeks as his substitute.

With James Hinchcliffe (Weeks 8 and 9, injury replacement)

Week #	Dance	Song	Judges' score				Total	Result
Week #	Dance	Song	Inaba	Goodman	J. Hough	Tonioli	Total	Result
8	Viennese waltz	Viennese Waltz / "You Don't Own Me"	10	—N/a	10	10	30	Safe
9	Jazz	"A Brand New Day" — Luther Vandross	9	—N/a	9	9	36 (Note: James and Jenna also received a score of 9 from guest judge Idina Menzel, who filled in for Len Goodman.)	Safe
9	Paso doble (Note: James and Jenna were teamed-up with Calvin and Lindsay.)	"No Good" — Kaleo	9	—N/a	9	9	35 (Note: The team-up dance also received a score of 10 from guest judge Idina Menzel, who filled in for Len Goodman.)	Safe

==== Season 26 ====
With celebrity partner Adam Rippon

Week #	Dance	Song	Judges' score			Total	Result
Week #	Dance	Song	Inaba	Goodman	Tonioli	Total	Result
1	Cha-cha-cha	"Sissy That Walk" — RuPaul	8	8	8	24	Safe
2	Quickstep	"Make Way" — Aloe Blacc	9	9	10	37 (Note: Adam and Jenna also received a score of 9 from guest judge Rashad Jennings)	Safe
2	Team Freestyle	"Instant Replay" — Dan Hartman	9	9	9	37 (Note: The team freestyle also received a score of 10 from guest judge Rashad Jennings)	Safe
3	Contemporary	"O" — Coldplay	10	9	10	39 (Note: Adam and Jenna also received a score of 10 from guest judge David Ross)	Safe
3	Jive Dance-off	"Johnny B. Goode" — Chuck Berry	+2			2 (Note: Adam & Jenna received two points from winning the dance-off, which included votes from Carrie Ann and Bruno, plus the public vote (64%).)	Safe
4	Jazz	"Anything You Can Do" — Bernadette Peters & Tom Wopat	10	10	10	30	Winners
4	Freestyle	"Scooby Doo Pa Pa" — DJ Kass	9	9	10	28	Winners

==== Season 27 ====
With celebrity partner Joe Amabile

Week #	Dance	Song	Judges' score			Total	Result
Week #	Dance	Song	Inaba	Goodman	Tonioli	Total	Result
1	Quickstep	"Fish Out of Water" — Leo Soul	5	4	5	14	Safe
2	Foxtrot	"New York State of Mind" — Matt Beilis	5	6	6	17	No Elimination
2	Jazz	"The Gambler" — Kenny Rogers	6	6	6	18	Safe
3	Viennese waltz	"You Are the Reason" — Calum Scott & Leona Lewis	6	6	6	18	Safe
4	Salsa (Note: Performed with Jordan Kimball for Trio Night.)	"I'm Too Sexy" — Right Said Fred	5	5	5	15	Safe
5	Jive	"Zero" — Imagine Dragons	6	5	6	17	No Elimination
6	Argentine tango	"El Tango de Roxanne" — José Feliciano, Ewan McGregor & Jacek Koman	8	7	7	22	Safe
7	Tango	"Burning Man" — Dierks Bentley, feat. Brothers Osborne	7	7	7	21	Safe
7	Team Freestyle	"Country Girl (Shake It for Me)" — Luke Bryan	9	8	9	26	Safe
8	Contemporary	"This Year's Love" — David Gray	8	7	7	22	Eliminated
8	Quickstep	"Check it Out" — Oh the Larceny	8	8	8	24	Eliminated

==== Season 28 ====
With celebrity partner Karamo Brown

Week #	Dance	Song	Judges' score			Total	Result
Week #	Dance	Song	Inaba	Goodman	Tonioli	Total	Result
1	Salsa	"Juice" — Lizzo	6	5	6	17	No Elimination
2	Quickstep	"Let's Go Crazy" — Prince & The Revolution	7	5	7	19	Safe
3	Jive	"I'm Still Standing" — Elton John	5	5	6	16	Safe
4	Tango	"Old Town Road" — Lil Nas X, feat. Billy Ray Cyrus	7	7	7	28 (Note: Karamo and Jenna also received a score of 7 from guest judge Leah Remini)	Bottom two
5	Samba	"I Just Can't Wait to Be King" — JD McCrary, Shahadi Wright Joseph & John Oliver	7	7	7	21	No Elimination
6	Contemporary	"Someone You Loved" — Lewis Capaldi	9	8	8	25	Safe
7	Paso doble	"Survivor" — 2WEI	9	8	8	25	Eliminated
7	Team Freestyle	"Sweet Dreams" — Beyoncé	8	8	8	24	Eliminated

Due to passing of Lindsay Arnold's mother-in-law, Johnson stepped in to dance with former White House Press Secretary Sean Spicer for weeks 8 and 9.

Week #	Dance	Song	Judges' score			Total	Result
Week #	Dance	Song	Inaba	Goodman	Tonioli	Total	Result
8	Jazz	"Come Sail Away" — Styx	7	7	6	20	Safe
8	Cha-cha-cha Dance-off	"Gonna Make You Sweat (Everybody Dance Now)" — C+C Music Factory	Loser			0 (Note: Sean and Jenna did not receive any points for losing the dance-off.)	Safe
9	Argentine tango	"Bills, Bills, Bills" — Destiny's Child	7	6	6	26 (Note: Sean and Jenna also received a score of 7 from guest judge Joey Fatone)	Eliminated
9	Foxtrot	"Story of My Life" — One Direction	6	6	6	24 (Note: Sean and Jenna also received a score of 6 from guest judge Joey Fatone)	Eliminated

==== Season 29 ====
With celebrity partner Nev Schulman

Week #	Dance	Song	Judges' score			Total	Result
Week #	Dance	Song	Inaba	D. Hough	Tonioli	Total	Result
1	Foxtrot	"The Way You Look Tonight" — Frank Sinatra	7	7	6	20	No Elimination
2	Cha-cha-cha	"Dynamite" — BTS	7	7	7	21	Safe
3	Argentine tango	"Angelica" — Rodrigo y Gabriela	8	8	8	24	Safe
4	Rumba	"Because You Loved Me" — Celine Dion	8	8	8	24	Safe
5	Quickstep	"Take On Me" — A-ha	8	9	9	26	Safe
6	Jazz	"Good Vibrations" — Marky Mark and the Funky Bunch	9	9	8	26	Safe
7	Paso doble	"Swan Lake Remix" — District 78	10	10	10	30	Safe
8	Viennese waltz	"Stuck with U" — Ariana Grande & Justin Bieber	9	9	9	27	Safe
8	Cha-cha-cha Relay	"Rain on Me" — Lady Gaga & Ariana Grande	+3			3 (Note: Nev and Jenna received 3 bonus points from the relay round.)	Safe
9	Jive	"Saturday Night's Alright for Fighting" — Elton John	9	9	9	27	Safe
10	Foxtrot	"Sign of the Times" — Harry Styles	10	10	10	30	Safe
10	Contemporary	"If the World Was Ending" — JP Saxe & Julia Michaels	10	10	10	30	Safe
11	Paso doble	"Swan Lake Remix" — District 78	10	10	10	30	Runners-up
11	Freestyle	"Singin' In The Rain" — District 78	10	10	10	30	Runners-up

==== Season 30 ====
With celebrity partner JoJo Siwa

Week #	Dance	Song	Judges' score				Total	Result
Week #	Dance	Song	Inaba	Goodman	D. Hough	Tonioli	Total	Result
1	Quickstep	"Are You Gonna Be My Girl" — Jet	8	7	7	7	29	No Elimination
2	Cha-cha-cha	"Rain on Me" — Lady Gaga & Ariana Grande	8	8	7	8	31	Safe
3	Argentine tango	"...Baby One More Time" — Britney Spears	8	8	—N/a	8	24 (Note: Due to Derek Hough's absence, scores were given on a 30 point scale.)	Safe
4	Viennese waltz	"A Dream Is a Wish Your Heart Makes" — Ilene Woods	9	8	9	9	35	No Elimination
4	Paso doble	"Ways to Be Wicked" — Dove Cameron, Sofia Carson, Cameron Boyce & Booboo Stewart	8	9	9	9	35	Safe
5	Foxtrot	"Look at Me, I'm Sandra Dee (Reprise)" — Olivia Newton-John	10	10	10	10	40	Safe
6	Jazz	"Anything Goes" — District 78, feat. Patrice Covington	10	10	10	10	40	Safe
7	Tango	"Body Language" — Queen	10	9	10	10	39	Bottom Two
7	Foxtrot Relay	"Under Pressure" (with David Bowie) — Queen	+0				0 (Note: JoJo and Jenna did not receive any bonus points from the relay.)	Bottom Two
8	Salsa	"Feedback" — Janet Jackson	10	9	10	10	39	Safe
8	Rumba Dance-off	"That's the Way Love Goes" — Janet Jackson	Winner				2 (Note: JoJo and Jenna received two bonus points for winning the dance-off.)	Safe
9	Argentine tango	"Santa María (del Buen Ayre)" — Gotan Project	10	10	10	10	40	Safe
9	Contemporary	"Before You Go" (piano version) — Lewis Capaldi	10	10	10	10	40	Safe
10	Cha-cha-cha & Tango Fusion	"I Love It" — Icona Pop, featuring Charli XCX	10	10	10	10	40	Runners-up
10	Freestyle	"Born This Way" — Lady Gaga	10	10	10	10	40	Runners-up

==== Season 32 ====
With celebrity partner Tyson Beckford

Week #	Dance	Song	Judges' score			Total	Result
Week #	Dance	Song	Inaba	D. Hough	Tonioli	Total	Result
1	Cha-cha-cha	"Never Too Much" — Luther Vandross	4	4	4	12	Safe
2	Salsa	"Aguanilé" — Willie Colón & Héctor Lavoe	6	6	6	18	Safe
3	Foxtrot	"Master Blaster (Jammin')" — Stevie Wonder	5	5	5	20 (Note: Tyson and Jenna also received a score of 5 from guest judge Michael Strahan)	Eliminated

==== Season 33 ====
With celebrity partner Joey Graziadei

Week #	Dance	Song	Judges' score			Total	Result
Week #	Dance	Song	Inaba	D. Hough	Tonioli	Total	Result
1	Cha-cha-cha	"Dancin' in the Country" — Tyler Hubbard	7	7	7	21	No Elimination
2	Rumba	"Shallow" — Lady Gaga & Bradley Cooper	8	7	7	22	Safe
3	Jive	"Shout" — The Isley Brothers	9	8	8	34 (Note: Joey and Jenna also received a score of 9 from guest judge Rosie Perez)	No Elimination
3	Tango	"Rock You Like a Hurricane" — Scorpions	9	9	9	36 (Note: Joey and Jenna also received a score of 9 from guest judge Gene Simmons)	Safe
4	Viennese waltz	"Lose Control" — Teddy Swims	9	9	9	36 (Note: Joey and Jenna also received a score of 9 from guest judge Mark Ballas)	Safe
5	Samba	"Trashin' the Camp" — Phil Collins and NSYNC	8	8	9	25	Safe
5	Team Freestyle	"I 2 I" — Tevin Campbell & Rosie Gaines	9	9	9	27	Safe
6	Argentine tango	"Ramalama (Bang Bang)" — Róisín Murphy	10	9	10	29	Safe
6	Jive Dance-off	"Time Warp" — Little Nell, Patricia Quinn, & Richard O'Brien	+3			3 (Note: Joey and Jenna received 3 bonus points for winning the dance-off.)	Safe
7	Contemporary	"Work Song" — Hozier	9	10	9	28	Safe
7	Rumba	"Birds of a Feather" — Billie Eilish	9	9	9	27	Safe
8	Foxtrot	"I Won't Dance" — Erin Boheme feat. District 78	10	10	10	30	Safe
8	Paso doble	"Come Together" — Lennon & McCartney	9	10	9	28	Safe
9	Cha-cha-cha	"Can't Stop the Feeling!" — Justin Timberlake	10	10	10	30	Winners
9	Freestyle	"Canned Heat" — District 78 feat. Jake Simpson	9	10	10	29	Winners

Notes

Season 34

With celebrity partner Corey Feldman

Week #	Dance	Song	Judges' score			Total	Result
Week #	Dance	Song	Inaba	D. Hough	Tonioli	Total	Result
1	Tango	"It's Still Rock and Roll to Me" — Billy Joel	—N/a	4	5	9 (Note: Due to Carrie Ann Inaba's absence, scores were given on a 20 point scale.)	No Elimination
2	Cha-cha-cha	"Baby Got Back" — Sir Mix-a-Lot	5	5	5	15	Eliminated

==== Season 35 ====
With celebrity partner Harry Shum Jr.

Week #	Dance	Song	Judges' score			Total	Result
Week #	Dance	Song	Inaba	D. Hough	Tonioli	Total	Result
1	Cha-cha-cha	"Let's Groove" — Earth, Wind & Fire	7	7	7	21	Safe
2	Viennese Waltz	"Iris" — Goo Goo Dolls	6	6	6	18	Safe
3	Jive	"You Make My Dreams (Come True)" — Daryl Hall & John Oates	8	8	8	24	Safe
4	Tango	"It's Like That" — Mariah Carey feat. Jermaine Dupri and Fatman Scoop	8	8	8	24	Safe
5	Samba	"Yeah!" — Usher feat. Lil Jon and Ludacris	8	8	8	33 (Note: Harry and Jenna also received a score of 9 from guest judge Joe Buck)	Safe
6	Foxtrot	"Stop This Train" — John Mayer	9	9	9	36 (Note: Harry and Jenna also received a score of 9 from guest judge Kym Johnson)	No elimination
7	Contemporary	"Toxic" — 2WEI (cover of Britney Spears)	10	10	10	40 (Note: Harry and Jenna also received a score of 10 from guest judge Shirley Ballas)	Safe
8	Jazz	"Supercalifragilisticexpialidocious" — from Mary Poppins	10	10	10	40 (Note: Harry and Jenna also received a score of 10 from guest judge Cynthia Erivo)	Safe
8	Team Freestyle	"We're All In This Together" — from High School Musical	10	10	10	40 (Note: Team Wildcats also received a score of 10 from guest judge Cynthia Erivo)	Safe
9	Salsa	"Die With a Smile" — Lady Gaga & Bruno Mars	10	9	10	29	Safe
10	Paso Doble	"We Found Love" — Rihanna feat. Calvin Harris	10	10	10	30	Eliminated
10	Quickstep	"Valerie" — Mark Ronson feat. Amy Winehouse	10	10	10	30	Eliminated

== Personal life ==
Johnson first met fellow Dancing with the Stars pro Valentin Chmerkovskiy during its eighteenth season. They started dating in 2015, but their relationship was not made public until February 2016. Johnson and Chmerkovskiy separated sometime during the twenty-third season of Dancing with the Stars, and reconciled their romance in June 2017. They announced their engagement on June 14, 2018, during a trip to Venice, Italy.

On April 13, 2019, Johnson married Chmerkovskiy in Rancho Palos Verdes, California. Among her bridesmaids were her former dance partner Adam Rippon and Lindsay Arnold. Johnson openly struggled with fertility and suffered a miscarriage in 2021, which placed her in a deep depression for about eight months. On July 15, 2022, Chmerkovskiy and Johnson announced that they were expecting. Their son was born on January 10, 2023.

Awards and achievements
Preceded by Jordan Fisher & Lindsay Arnold; Xochitl Gomez & Val Chmerkovskiy	Dancing with the Stars (US) winner Season 26 (Spring 2018 with Adam Rippon); Season 33 (Fall 2024 with Joey Graziadei)	Succeeded by Bobby Bones & Sharna Burgess; Robert Irwin & Witney Carson
Preceded by Kel Mitchell & Witney Carson	Dancing with the Stars (US) runner-up Season 29 (Fall 2020 with Nev Schulman); Season 30 (Fall 2021 with JoJo Siwa)	Succeeded by Gabby Windey & Val Chmerkovskiy
Preceded by Mirai Nagasu & Alan Bersten; Chris Mazdzer & Witney Carson; Jennie Finch Daigle & Keo Motsepe	Dancing with the Stars (US) semi-finalist Season 27 (Fall 2018 with Joe Amabile)	Succeeded by James Van Der Beek & Emma Slater
Preceded by Geraldo Rivera & Edyta Śliwińska	Dancing with the Stars (US) last place Season 23 (Fall 2016 with Jake T. Austin)	Succeeded by Chris Kattan & Witney Carson
