= Dancing with the Stars (American TV series) season 26 =

Dancing with the Stars: Athletes
- Season 26
- Promotional poster featuring pro dancers Emma Slater and Keo Motsepe
- Hosted by: Tom Bergeron; Erin Andrews
- Judges: Carrie Ann Inaba; Len Goodman; Bruno Tonioli
- Celebrity winner: Adam Rippon
- Professional winner: Jenna Johnson
- No. of episodes: 4

Release
- Original network: ABC
- Original release: April 30 – May 21, 2018

Season chronology
- ← Previous; Season 25 Next → Season 27

Season twenty-six of Dancing with the Stars, titled Dancing with the Stars: Athletes, premiered on April 30, 2018, on the ABC network. The four-week season, the shortest ever, featured a cast of current and former athletes.

On May 21, Olympic figure skater Adam Rippon and Jenna Johnson were crowned the champions, while Washington Redskins cornerback Josh Norman and Sharna Burgess, and former Olympic figure skater Tonya Harding and Sasha Farber, were both announced as the runners-up during the live finale. It was later revealed that Josh and Sharna had placed second, while Tonya and Sasha had placed third.

== Overview ==
Dancing with the Stars is an American reality dance competition television series that premiered on ABC on June 1, 2005. It is the American version of the British contest program Strictly Come Dancing. The series pairs celebrities with professional dancers to perform a variety of dance styles, primarily ballroom and Latin routines. Each couple competes against the others for judges' points and audience votes. The couple receiving the lowest combined total of judges' points and audience votes is usually eliminated each week until only the champion pair remains.

== Cast ==
=== Couples ===
The professional dancers were announced on April 12, 2018. The eight professionals returning from season 25 were Lindsay Arnold, Alan Bersten, Sharna Burgess, Witney Carson, Artem Chigvintsev, Keo Motsepe, Gleb Savchenko, and Emma Slater. The two remaining professional dancers were both in the troupe last season, and had previously been professional dancers on the show: Sasha Farber and Jenna Johnson. The dance troupe for season 26 consisted of Artur Adamski, Brandon Armstrong, Hayley Erbert, and Britt Stewart. Additionally, professional dancer Morgan Larson, who performed on the Dancing with the Stars: Light Up the Night tour, joined the troupe for season 26.

The cast was announced on April 13 on Good Morning America.

Celebrity	Notability	Professional partner	Status	Ref.
Jamie Anderson	Olympic snowboarder	Artem Chigvintsev	Eliminated 1st & 2nd on April 30, 2018	
Johnny Damon	MLB outfielder	Emma Slater	Eliminated 1st & 2nd on April 30, 2018	
Kareem Abdul-Jabbar	NBA center	Lindsay Arnold	Eliminated 3rd & 4th on May 7, 2018	
Arike Ogunbowale	Women's basketball player	Gleb Savchenko	Eliminated 3rd & 4th on May 7, 2018	
Jennie Finch Daigle	Olympic softball pitcher	Keo Motsepe	Eliminated 5th, 6th & 7th on May 14, 2018	
Chris Mazdzer	Olympic luger	Witney Carson	Eliminated 5th, 6th & 7th on May 14, 2018	
Mirai Nagasu	Olympic figure skater	Alan Bersten	Eliminated 5th, 6th & 7th on May 14, 2018	
Tonya Harding	Olympic figure skater	Sasha Farber	Third place on May 21, 2018	
Josh Norman	NFL cornerback	Sharna Burgess	Runners-up on May 21, 2018	
Adam Rippon	Olympic figure skater	Jenna Johnson	Winners on May 21, 2018	

=== Hosts and judges ===
Tom Bergeron and Erin Andrews returned as hosts, while Carrie Ann Inaba, Len Goodman, and Bruno Tonioli returned as judges. On May 7, season 24 champion Rashad Jennings returned as a guest judge, and on May 14, season 24 runner-up David Ross also appeared as a guest judge.

== Episodes ==
No. overall	No. in season	Title	Rating (18–49)	Original release date	U.S. viewers (millions)
423	1	"First Dances"	1.10	April 30, 2018	8.48
424	2	"Team Dance Night"	1.00	May 7, 2018	7.73
425	3	"MVP Night (Semifinals)"	1.00	May 14, 2018	7.68
426	4	"Finale"	1.10	May 21, 2018	8.77

== Scoring chart ==
The highest score each week is indicated in bold green with a dagger (†), while the lowest score each week is indicated in italicized red with a double-dagger (‡).

Color key:

Winners
Runners-up
Third place
Eliminated

Dancing with the Stars (season 26) - Weekly scores
Couple	Pl.	Week			
Couple	Pl.	1	2 (Note: The couples were scored on a 40-point scale due to the presence of a guest judge.)	3	4
Adam & Jenna	1st	**24**†	37+37=**74**†	39+2=**41**†	30+28=**58**† (Note: This couple finished in first place.)
Josh & Sharna	2nd	**24**†	30+33=63	36+2=38	27+30=57 (Note: This couple finished in second place.)
Tonya & Sasha	3rd	23	33+33=66	33+2=35	26+30=56‡ (Note: This couple finished in third place.)
Jennie & Keo	4th	21	26+37=63	29‡ (Note: This couple was eliminated.)	
Chris & Witney	4th	21	33+33=66	33	
Mirai & Alan	4th	23	37+37=**74**†	35	
Kareem & Lindsay	7th	17‡	26+33=59‡		
Arike & Gleb	7th	20	33+37=70		
Jamie & Artem	9th	19			
Johnny & Emma	9th	18			

== Weekly scores ==
Individual judges' scores in the charts below (given in parentheses) are listed in this order from left to right: Carrie Ann Inaba, Len Goodman, Bruno Tonioli.

=== Week 1: First Dances ===
The couples danced the cha-cha-cha, foxtrot, salsa, or Viennese waltz. Couples are listed in the order they performed.

Viewers were able to vote for the couples online so that the results of the vote could be used to determine the first two eliminations that same evening.

Couple	Scores	Dance	Music	Result
Chris & Witney	21 (7, 7, 7)	Salsa	"Mr. Put It Down" — Ricky Martin, feat. Pitbull	Safe
Kareem & Lindsay	17 (6, 5, 6)	Cha-cha-cha	"Signed, Sealed, Delivered I'm Yours" — Stevie Wonder	Safe
Jennie & Keo	21 (7, 7, 7)	Foxtrot	"All-American Girl" — Carrie Underwood	Safe
Jamie & Artem	19 (6, 7, 6)	Viennese waltz	"Feeling Good" — Avicii, feat. Audra Mae	Eliminated
Mirai & Alan	23 (7, 8, 8)	Salsa	"No Excuses" — Meghan Trainor	Safe
Arike & Gleb	20 (7, 6, 7)	Salsa	"Them Girls" — Whitney Myer	Safe
Adam & Jenna	24 (8, 8, 8)	Cha-cha-cha	"Sissy That Walk" — RuPaul	Safe
Johnny & Emma	18 (6, 6, 6)	Foxtrot	"Centerfield" — John Fogerty	Eliminated
Tonya & Sasha	23 (8, 8, 7)	Foxtrot	"When You Believe" — Whitney Houston & Mariah Carey	Safe
Josh & Sharna	24 (8, 8, 8)	Cha-cha-cha	"Finesse" — Bruno Mars	Safe

=== Week 2: Team Dance Night ===
Individual judges' scores in the chart below (given in parentheses) are listed in this order from left to right: Carrie Ann Inaba, Rashad Jennings, Len Goodman, Bruno Tonioli.

The couples performed one unlearned dance and a team dance celebrating an iconic decade in sports. Couples are listed in the order they performed.

Couple	Scores	Dance	Music	Result
Josh & Sharna	30 (7, 7, 8, 8)	Paso doble	"The Plaza of Execution" — James Horner	Safe
Jennie & Keo	26 (6, 7, 7, 6)	Cha-cha-cha	"Do It Like This" — Daphne Willis	Safe
Kareem & Lindsay	26 (7, 7, 6, 6)	Salsa	"La malanga" — Eddie Palmieri	Eliminated
Chris & Witney	33 (9, 8, 8, 8)	Viennese waltz	"Next to Me" — Imagine Dragons	Safe
Tonya & Sasha	33 (8, 9, 8, 8)	Quickstep	"Redneck Woman" — Gretchen Wilson	Safe
Mirai & Alan	37 (9, 10, 9, 9)	Foxtrot	"It's a Small World" — The O'Neill Brothers	Safe
Arike & Gleb	33 (8, 9, 8, 8)	Foxtrot	"What About Us" — Pink	Eliminated
Adam & Jenna	37 (9, 9, 9, 10)	Quickstep	"Make Way" — Aloe Blacc	Safe
Chris & Witney Josh & Sharna Kareem & Lindsay Tonya & Sasha	33 (8, 9, 8, 8)	Freestyle (Team 1950s Tennis)	"...Baby One More Time" — The Baseballs	
Adam & Jenna Arike & Gleb Jennie & Keo Mirai & Alan	37 (9, 10, 9, 9)	Freestyle (Team 1970s Football)	"Instant Replay" — Dan Hartman	

=== Week 3: MVP Night (Semifinals) ===
Individual judges' scores in the chart below (given in parentheses) are listed in this order from left to right: Carrie Ann Inaba, David Ross, Len Goodman, Bruno Tonioli.

The couples performed one unlearned dance dedicated to the "MVP" in their lives, and participated in paired dance-offs for extra points. Former contestants were brought in to mentor the couples for the dance-offs. Couples are listed in the order they performed.

Couple	Scores	Dance	Music	Result
Mirai & Alan	35 (9, 9, 8, 9)	Quickstep	"BO$$" — Fifth Harmony	Eliminated
Jennie & Keo	29 (7, 8, 7, 7)	Viennese waltz	"The Rest of Our Life" — Tim McGraw & Faith Hill	Eliminated
Chris & Witney	33 (8, 9, 7, 9)	Foxtrot	"I Got Rhythm" — Ray Chew	Eliminated
Tonya & Sasha	33 (8, 9, 8, 8)	Rumba	"See You Again" — Tyler Ward	Safe
Adam & Jenna	39 (10, 10, 9, 10)	Contemporary	"O" — Coldplay	Safe
Josh & Sharna	36 (9, 9, 9, 9)	Contemporary	"Stand by Me" — Bootstraps	Safe

Dance-offs
Couple	Mentor	Dance	Music	Result
Tonya & Sasha (Note: Tonya & Sasha received votes from Carrie Ann, Len, and Bruno.)	Nastia Liukin	Cha-cha-cha	"Dance" — DNCE	Winners
Jennie & Keo (Note: Jennie & Keo received a vote from guest judge David Ross, plus the public vote (60%).)	Nastia Liukin	Cha-cha-cha	"Dance" — DNCE	Losers
Adam & Jenna (Note: Adam & Jenna received votes from Carrie Ann and Bruno, plus the public vote (64%).)	Meryl Davis	Jive	"Johnny B. Goode" — Chuck Berry	Winners
Mirai & Alan (Note: Mirai & Alan received votes from David and Len.)	Meryl Davis	Jive	"Johnny B. Goode" — Chuck Berry	Losers
Josh & Sharna (Note: Josh & Sharna received votes from David, Len, and Bruno.)	Von Miller	Salsa	"WTF (Where They From)" — Missy Elliott, feat. Pharrell Williams	Winners
Chris & Witney (Note: Chris & Witney received a vote from Carrie Ann, plus the public vote (55%).)	Von Miller	Salsa	"WTF (Where They From)" — Missy Elliott, feat. Pharrell Williams	Losers

=== Week 4: Finale ===
The final three couples performed one unlearned dance inspired by their journey on the show and their freestyle routine. Couples are listed in the order they performed.

Couple	Scores	Dance	Music	Result
Tonya & Sasha	26 (8, 9, 9)	Viennese waltz	"The Time of My Life" — David Cook	Third Place
Tonya & Sasha	30 (10, 10, 10)	Freestyle	"I Will Survive" — The Pussycat Dolls	Third Place
Josh & Sharna	27 (9, 9, 9)	Foxtrot	"Conqueror" — from Empire, feat. Estelle & Jussie Smollett	Runners-up
Josh & Sharna	30 (10, 10, 10)	Freestyle	"Walk on Water" — Thirty Seconds to Mars	Runners-up
Adam & Jenna	30 (10, 10, 10)	Jazz	"Anything You Can Do" — Bernadette Peters & Tom Wopat	Winners
Adam & Jenna	28 (9, 9, 10)	Freestyle	"Scooby Doo Pa Pa" — DJ Kass	Winners

== Dance chart ==
The couples performed the following each week:

- Week 1: One unlearned dance
- Week 2: One unlearned dance & team dance
- Week 3: One unlearned dance & ballroom battles
- Week 4 (Finals): One unlearned dance & freestyle

Dancing with the Stars (season 26) - Dance chart
Couple	Week						
Couple	1	2		3		4	
Adam & Jenna	Cha-cha-cha	Quickstep	Team Freestyle	Contemp.	Jive	Jazz	Freestyle
Josh & Sharna	Cha-cha-cha	Paso doble	Team Freestyle	Contemp.	Salsa	Foxtrot	Freestyle
Tonya & Sasha	Foxtrot	Quickstep	Team Freestyle	Rumba	Cha-cha-cha	Viennese waltz	Freestyle
Jennie & Keo	Foxtrot	Cha-cha-cha	Team Freestyle	Viennese waltz	Cha-cha-cha		
Chris & Witney	Salsa	Viennese waltz	Team Freestyle	Foxtrot	Salsa		
Mirai & Alan	Salsa	Foxtrot	Team Freestyle	Quickstep	Jive		
Kareem & Lindsay	Cha-cha-cha	Salsa	Team Freestyle				
Arike & Gleb	Salsa	Foxtrot	Team Freestyle				
Jamie & Artem	Viennese waltz						
Johnny & Emma	Foxtrot						
