= Top-rated United States television programs of 2017–18 =

This table displays the top-rated primetime television series of the 2017–18 season, as measured by Nielsen Media Research.

| Rank | Program | Network | Rating |
|---|---|---|---|
| 1 | The Big Bang Theory | CBS | 11.1 |
| 2 | NCIS | CBS | 10.3 |
| 2 | Sunday Night Football | NBC | 10.3 |
| 4 | This Is Us | NBC | 10.2 |
| 4 | Roseanne | ABC | 10.2 |
| 6 | Young Sheldon | CBS | 9.5 |
| 7 | The Good Doctor | ABC | 9.3 |
| 8 | Bull | CBS | 8.9 |
| 9 | Thursday Night Football | CBS/NBC | 8.5 |
| 10 | Blue Bloods | CBS | 8.2 |
| 11 | NCIS: New Orleans | CBS | 7.8 |
| 12 | The Voice | NBC | 7.1 |
| 12 | 60 Minutes | CBS | 7.1 |
| 12 | Grey's Anatomy | ABC | 7.1 |
| 15 | Dancing with the Stars | ABC | 6.9 |
| 16 | Hawaii Five-0 | CBS | 6.8 |
| 16 | The Voice: Tuesday | NBC | 6.8 |
| 18 | Mom | CBS | 6.7 |
| 19 | Chicago Med | NBC | 6.6 |
| 19 | NCIS: Los Angeles | CBS | 6.6 |
| 21 | Chicago P.D. | NBC | 6.5 |
| 22 | Chicago Fire | NBC | 6.2 |
| 23 | SEAL Team | CBS | 6.1 |
| 23 | Instinct | CBS | 6.1 |
| 25 | Criminal Minds | CBS | 6.0 |
| 25 | 9-1-1 | FOX | 6.0 |
| 25 | Dancing with the Stars: Athletes | ABC | 6.0 |
| 28 | Survivor | CBS | 5.9 |
| 29 | S.W.A.T. | CBS | 5.8 |
| 30 | Madam Secretary | CBS | 5.6 |
| 30 | American Idol - Monday | ABC | 5.6 |
| 30 | Law & Order: Special Victims Unit | NBC | 5.6 |
