= Dancing with the Stars (American TV series) season 27 =

Dancing with the Stars
- Season 27
- Promotional poster featuring pro dancers Witney Carson and Gleb Savchenko
- Hosted by: Tom Bergeron; Erin Andrews
- Judges: Carrie Ann Inaba; Len Goodman; Bruno Tonioli
- Celebrity winner: Bobby Bones
- Professional winner: Sharna Burgess
- No. of episodes: 11

Release
- Original network: ABC
- Original release: September 24 – November 19, 2018

Season chronology
- ← Previous; Season 26 Next → Season 28

Season twenty-seven of Dancing with the Stars premiered on September 24, 2018, on the ABC network.

On November 19, radio personality Bobby Bones and Sharna Burgess were crowned the champions. Disney Channel star Milo Manheim and Witney Carson, actress Evanna Lynch and Keo Motsepe, and model Alexis Ren and Alan Bersten finished originally in second place, but it subsequently revealed that Milo and Witney finished second, Evanna and Keo finished in third, and Alexis and Alan finished in fourth.

== Cast ==
=== Couples ===
This season featured thirteen celebrity contestants. The thirteen professional dancers were revealed on Good Morning America on August 28, 2018. The ten professionals from last season returned, along with Cheryl Burke and Valentin Chmerkovskiy, both of whom had last competed in season 25. Troupe dancer Brandon Armstrong made his debut in the pro lineup. Nancy McKeon was announced as the first celebrity competing for the season, partnered with Chmerkovskiy. On September 12, the rest of the cast was revealed on Good Morning America. The dance troupe for season 27 consisted of season 26 troupe members Artur Adamski, Hayley Erbert, Britt Stewart, and Morgan Larson; along with newcomer Vladislav Kvartin.

Celebrity	Notability	Professional partner	Status	Ref.
Nikki Glaser	Comedian & podcast host	Gleb Savchenko	Eliminated 1st on September 25, 2018	
Danelle Umstead	Paralympic alpine skier	Artem Chigvintsev	Eliminated 2nd on October 2, 2018	
Nancy McKeon	The Facts of Life actress	Valentin Chmerkovskiy	Eliminated 3rd on October 8, 2018	
Tinashe	Singer-songwriter	Brandon Armstrong	Eliminated 4th on October 15, 2018	
Mary Lou Retton	Olympic artistic gymnast	Sasha Farber	Eliminated 5th on October 29, 2018	
John Schneider	Actor & country music singer	Emma Slater	Eliminated 6th & 7th on November 5, 2018	
DeMarcus Ware	NFL linebacker	Lindsay Arnold	Eliminated 6th & 7th on November 5, 2018	
Joe Amabile	Reality television personality	Jenna Johnson	Eliminated 8th & 9th on November 12, 2018	
Juan Pablo Di Pace	Fuller House actor	Cheryl Burke	Eliminated 8th & 9th on November 12, 2018	
Alexis Ren	Model & social media personality	Alan Bersten	Fourth place on November 19, 2018	
Evanna Lynch	Harry Potter actress & activist	Keo Motsepe	Third place on November 19, 2018	
Milo Manheim	Disney Channel actor	Witney Carson	Runners-up on November 19, 2018	
Bobby Bones	Radio personality	Sharna Burgess	Winners on November 19, 2018	

=== Hosts and judges ===
Tom Bergeron and Erin Andrews returned as hosts, while Carrie Ann Inaba, Len Goodman, and Bruno Tonioli returned as judges.

== Episodes ==
No. overall	No. in season	Title	Rating (18–49)	Original release date	U.S. viewers (millions)
427	1	"Premiere Night"	1.00	September 24, 2018	7.68
428	2	"Night 2"	0.89	September 25, 2018	6.55
429	3	"New York City"	0.85	October 1, 2018	7.06
430	4	"Las Vegas"	0.77	October 2, 2018	6.15
431	5	"Most Memorable Year Night"	0.98	October 8, 2018	7.22
432	6	"Trio Night"	0.92	October 15, 2018	6.89
433	7	"Disney Night"	0.96	October 22, 2018	7.25
434	8	"Halloween Night"	0.95	October 29, 2018	7.25
435	9	"Country Night"	0.90	November 5, 2018	7.10
436	10	"Semifinals"	0.90	November 12, 2018	7.29
437	11	"Finals"	1.11	November 19, 2018	7.90

== Scoring chart ==
The highest score each week is indicated in bold green with a dagger (†), while the lowest score each week is indicated in italicized red with a double-dagger (‡).

Color key:

Winners
Runners-up
Third place
Fourth place
Bottom five
Eliminated

Dancing with the Stars (season 27) - Weekly scores
Couple	Pl.	Week												
Couple	Pl.	1		2			3	4	5	6	5+6	7	8	9
Couple	Pl.	Night 1	Night 2	Night 1	Night 2	1+2	3	4	5	6	5+6	7	8	9
Bobby & Sharna	1st	20		20	19	39	23	20	21	22	43	24+29=53	21+24=45‡	24+30=54‡ (Note: This couple finished in first place.)
Milo & Witney	2nd	20		**26**†	**26**†	**52**†	27	**29**†	27	**30**†	57	29+29=58	27+28=55	30+30=**60**† (Note: This couple finished in second place.)
Evanna & Keo	3rd	18		24	24	48	27	24	24	29	53	30+29=**59**†	30+28=58	30+30=**60**† (Note: This couple finished in third place.)
Alexis & Alan	4th	21 (Note: This contestant was in the bottom five after the first night's performance.)	**23**†	25	24	49	26	25	**29**†	27	56	29+26=55	28+30=58	27+30=57 (Note: This couple finished in fourth place.)
Joe & Jenna	5th	14‡		17‡	18‡	35‡	18‡	15‡	17‡	22	39‡	21+26=47‡	22+24=46 (Note: This couple was eliminated.)	
Juan Pablo & Cheryl	5th	22		**26**†	**26**†	**52**†	**30**†	24	**29**†	**30**†	**59**†	30+26=56	30+30=**60**†	
John & Emma	7th	18		23	20	43	21	21	24	19‡	43	25+29=54		
DeMarcus & Lindsay	7th	**23**†		24	23	47	26	22	26	26	52	27+26=53		
Mary Lou & Sasha	9th	19	21	22	24	46	24	26	25	24	49			
Tinashe & Brandon	10th	**23**†		**26**†	**26**†	**52**†	27	26						
Nancy & Val	11th	18	21	21	20	41	22							
Danelle & Artem	12th	18	18‡	18	19	37								
Nikki & Gleb	13th	17	18‡											

== Weekly scores ==
Individual judges' scores in the charts below (given in parentheses) are listed in this order from left to right: Carrie Ann Inaba, Len Goodman, Bruno Tonioli.

=== Week 1: Premiere Night ===
On the first night, all of the couples performed. On the second night, the bottom five couples were given a chance to dance again, in the same dance style as the first night, but with new music and choreography. Couples are listed in the order they performed.

Night 1

Couple	Scores	Dance	Music	Result
Mary Lou & Sasha	19 (6, 7, 6)	Cha-cha-cha	"Treasure" — Bruno Mars	Bottom five
Milo & Witney	20 (7, 6, 7)	Cha-cha-cha	"Free Free Free" — Pitbull, feat. Theron Theron	Safe
Evanna & Keo	18 (7, 5, 6)	Foxtrot	"Do You Believe in Magic" — Aly & AJ	Safe
Danelle & Artem	18 (6, 6, 6)	Foxtrot	"Rise Up" — Andra Day	Bottom five
Bobby & Sharna	20 (7, 6, 7)	Jive	"T-R-O-U-B-L-E" — Travis Tritt	Safe
Juan Pablo & Cheryl	22 (7, 7, 8)	Salsa	"Dinero" — Jennifer Lopez, feat. DJ Khaled & Cardi B	Safe
Nikki & Gleb	17 (6, 5, 6)	Salsa	"YES" — Louisa, feat. 2 Chainz	Bottom five
Alexis & Alan	21 (7, 7, 7)	Jive	"Good Golly, Miss Molly" — Little Richard	Bottom five
John & Emma	18 (7, 5, 6)	Foxtrot	"Theme from The Dukes of Hazzard (Good Ol' Boys)" — Waylon Jennings	Safe
Tinashe & Brandon	23 (8, 7, 8)	Jive	"I'm a Lady" — Meghan Trainor	Safe
Nancy & Val	18 (6, 6, 6)	Quickstep	"It Don't Mean a Thing (If It Ain't Got That Swing)" — Club des Belugas	Bottom five
Joe & Jenna	14 (5, 4, 5)	Quickstep	"Fish Out of Water" — Leo Soul	Safe
DeMarcus & Lindsay	23 (8, 7, 8)	Cha-cha-cha	"Sweet Sensation" — Flo Rida	Safe

Night 2

Couple	Scores	Dance	Music	Result
Mary Lou & Sasha	21 (7, 7, 7)	Cha-cha-cha	"Hot Stuff" — Donna Summer	Safe
Danelle & Artem	18 (6, 6, 6)	Foxtrot	"Strong Ones" — Armin van Buuren, feat. Cimo Fränkel	Safe
Nikki & Gleb	18 (6, 6, 6)	Salsa	"Tres Deseos" — Gloria Estefan	Eliminated
Alexis & Alan	23 (7, 8, 8)	Jive	"Shake the Room" — Gamu	Safe
Nancy & Val	21 (7, 7, 7)	Quickstep	"Walking on Sunshine" — Katrina and the Waves	Safe

=== Week 2: Cities Week ===
The couples performed two different unlearned dances that paid tribute to New York City and Las Vegas. Couples are listed in the order they performed.

Night 1 (New York City)

Couple	Scores	Dance	Music
DeMarcus & Lindsay	24 (8, 8, 8)	Foxtrot	"The Boy from New York City" — The Manhattan Transfer
Danelle & Artem	18 (6, 6, 6)	Cha-cha-cha	"Welcome to New York" — Taylor Swift
John & Emma	23 (8, 7, 8)	Charleston	"New York's My Home" — Sammy Davis Jr.
Nancy & Val	21 (7, 7, 7)	Cha-cha-cha	"Uptown Girl" — Billy Joel
Alexis & Alan	25 (8, 9, 8)	Argentine tango	"Swan Lake Suite" — Ray Chew
Joe & Jenna	17 (5, 6, 6)	Foxtrot	"New York State of Mind" — Matt Beilis
Tinashe & Brandon	26 (9, 8, 9)	Argentine tango	"New Dorp. New York." — SBTRKT, feat. Ezra Koenig
Milo & Witney	26 (9, 8, 9)	Charleston	"Living in New York City" — Robin Thicke
Mary Lou & Sasha	22 (8, 7, 7)	Waltz	"(You Make Me Feel Like) A Natural Woman" — Sarah Bockel
Juan Pablo & Cheryl	26 (9, 8, 9)	Quickstep	"42nd Street" — Cherry Poppin' Daddies
Evanna & Keo	24 (8, 8, 8)	Samba	"Can't Touch It" — Ricki-Lee Coulter
Bobby & Sharna	20 (7, 6, 7)	Foxtrot	"Theme from New York, New York" — Frank Sinatra

Night 2 (Las Vegas)

Couple	Scores	Dance	Music	Result
Juan Pablo & Cheryl	26 (9, 8, 9)	Foxtrot	"Why Don't You Do Right?" — Peggy Lee	Safe
Milo & Witney	26 (9, 8, 9)	Tango	"Ashes" — Celine Dion	Safe
Danelle & Artem	19 (7, 6, 6)	Quickstep	"Luck Be a Lady" — Donny Osmond	Eliminated
Alexis & Alan	24 (8, 8, 8)	Salsa	"Booty" — Jennifer Lopez, feat. Iggy Azalea	Safe
John & Emma	20 (7, 6, 7)	Jive	"King Creole" — Elvis Presley	Safe
DeMarcus & Lindsay	23 (8, 7, 8)	Quickstep	"Ladies Man" — Boyz II Men	Safe
Joe & Jenna	18 (6, 6, 6)	Jazz	"The Gambler" — Kenny Rogers	Safe
Evanna & Keo	24 (8, 8, 8)	Jive	"Heat Wave" — Martha and the Vandellas	Safe
Bobby & Sharna	19 (7, 6, 6)	Quickstep	"That Old Black Magic" — Sammy Davis Jr.	Safe
Nancy & Val	20 (7, 6, 7)	Paso doble	"Storm" (from Kà) — René Dupéré	Safe
Tinashe & Brandon	26 (9, 8, 9)	Cha-cha-cha	"Circus" — Britney Spears	Safe
Mary Lou & Sasha	24 (8, 8, 8)	Samba	"Copacabana" — Barry Manilow	Safe

=== Week 3: Most Memorable Year Night ===
The couples performed one unlearned dance to celebrate the most memorable year of their lives. Couples are listed in the order they performed.

Couple	Scores	Dance	Music	Result
Mary Lou & Sasha	24 (8, 8, 8)	Viennese waltz	"We Are the Champions" — Ray Chew	Safe
Milo & Witney	27 (9, 9, 9)	Jive	"Can You Do This" — Aloe Blacc	Safe
Nancy & Val	22 (8, 7, 7)	Rumba	"Love Someone" — Lukas Graham	Eliminated
Alexis & Alan	26 (9, 8, 9)	Contemporary	"How to Save a Life" — Ray Chew	Safe
Evanna & Keo	27 (9, 9, 9)	Viennese waltz	"Hedwig's Theme" — John Williams	Safe
Joe & Jenna	18 (6, 6, 6)	Viennese waltz	"You Are the Reason" — Calum Scott & Leona Lewis	Safe
Juan Pablo & Cheryl	30 (10, 10, 10)	Samba	"Ni Tú Ni Yo" — Jennifer Lopez, feat. Gente de Zona	Safe
John & Emma	21 (7, 7, 7)	Waltz	"Smile" — Ray Chew	Safe
Bobby & Sharna	23 (8, 7, 8)	Contemporary	"A Million Dreams" — Malachi Barton	Safe
Tinashe & Brandon	27 (9, 9, 9)	Rumba	"2 On" — Tinashe, feat. Schoolboy Q	Safe
DeMarcus & Lindsay	26 (9, 8, 9)	Argentine tango	"Lux Aeterna" — Clint Mansell & Kronos Quartet	Safe

=== Week 4: Trio Night ===
The couples performed a trio dance with a past celebrity contestant or a personal acquaintance. Couples are listed in the order they performed.

Couple	Trio dance partner	Scores	Dance	Music	Result
Juan Pablo & Cheryl	Melissa Rycroft	24 (8, 8, 8)	Cha-cha-cha	"Wavey" — CLiQ, feat. Alika McGillivary	Safe
Tinashe & Brandon	Amy Purdy	26 (9, 8, 9)	Tango	"Hit Me with Your Best Shot" — Pat Benatar	Eliminated
John & Emma	Joey Fatone	21 (7, 7, 7)	Argentine tango	"Torn" — Nathan Lanier	Safe
Evanna & Keo	Scarlett Byrne	24 (8, 8, 8)	Salsa	"Black Magic" — Little Mix	Safe
DeMarcus & Lindsay	Rashad Jennings	22 (7, 7, 8)	Paso doble	"Fire" — Barns Courtney	Safe
Mary Lou & Sasha	Nastia Liukin	26 (9, 8, 9)	Charleston	"V.E.S.P.A." — Dimie Cat	Safe
Milo & Witney	Riker Lynch	29 (10, 9, 10)	Salsa	"Adrenalina" — Wisin, feat. Ricky Martin & Jennifer Lopez	Safe
Joe & Jenna	Jordan Kimball	15 (5, 5, 5)	Salsa	"I'm Too Sexy" — Right Said Fred	Safe
Alexis & Alan	Maddie Ziegler	25 (8, 8, 9)	Tango	"Move Your Body" — Sia	Safe
Bobby & Sharna	Lindsey Stirling	20 (7, 6, 7)	Cha-cha-cha	"U Can't Touch This" — MC Hammer	Safe

=== Week 5: Disney Night ===
The couples performed one unlearned dance to a song from a Disney film, and are listed in the order they performed. There was no elimination at the end of the night.

Couple	Scores	Dance	Music	Disney film
Alexis & Alan	29 (10, 9, 10)	Foxtrot	"Just Around the Riverbend" — Judy Kuhn	Pocahontas
Juan Pablo & Cheryl	29 (10, 9, 10)	Viennese waltz	"Gaston" — Jesse Corti & Richard White	Beauty and the Beast
DeMarcus & Lindsay	26 (9, 8, 9)	Charleston	"A Star Is Born" — Alan Menken & David Zippel	Hercules
Evanna & Keo	24 (8, 8, 8)	Jazz	"When Will My Life Begin?" — Mandy Moore	Tangled
Joe & Jenna	17 (6, 5, 6)	Jive	"Zero" — Imagine Dragons	Ralph Breaks the Internet
Mary Lou & Sasha	25 (9, 8, 8)	Contemporary	"Reflection" — Lea Salonga	Mulan
John & Emma	24 (8, 8, 8)	Quickstep	"I Wan'na Be like You (The Monkey Song)" — Louis Prima	The Jungle Book
Bobby & Sharna	21 (7, 7, 7)	Waltz	"Part of Your World (Reprise)" — Jodi Benson	The Little Mermaid
Milo & Witney	27 (9, 8, 10)	Quickstep	"Incredits 2" — Michael Giacchino	Incredibles 2

=== Week 6: Halloween Night ===
The couples performed one unlearned dance to a Halloween-themed song. Couples are listed in the order they performed.

Couple	Scores	Dance	Music	Result
Milo & Witney	30 (10, 10, 10)	Contemporary	"Toxic" — 2WEI	Safe
John & Emma	19 (6, 7, 6)	Paso doble	"Main Titles" (from Beetlejuice) — Danny Elfman	Safe
DeMarcus & Lindsay	26 (8, 9, 9)	Salsa	"Under Your Spell" — Leo Soul	Safe
Evanna & Keo	29 (10, 9, 10)	Tango	"Disturbia" — Rihanna	Safe
Bobby & Sharna	22 (8, 7, 7)	Argentine tango	"Mr. Sandman" — SYML	Safe
Mary Lou & Sasha	24 (8, 8, 8)	Tango	"Shame" — Elle King	Eliminated
Alexis & Alan	27 (9, 9, 9)	Jazz	"Candyman" — Christina Aguilera	Safe
Joe & Jenna	22 (8, 7, 7)	Argentine tango	"El Tango de Roxanne" — José Feliciano, Ewan McGregor & Jacek Koman	Safe
Juan Pablo & Cheryl	30 (10, 10, 10)	Jive	"Dead Man's Party" — Atwater Men's Club	Safe

=== Week 7: Country Night ===
The couples performed one unlearned dance and a team dance to country songs. Couples are listed in the order they performed. Two couples were sent home at the end of the night in a double elimination.

Couple	Scores	Dance	Country music	Result
John & Emma	25 (8, 9, 8)	Jazz	"Thank God I'm a Country Boy" — John Denver	Eliminated
Evanna & Keo	30 (10, 10, 10)	Rumba	"Every Little Thing" — Carly Pearce	Safe
Juan Pablo & Cheryl	30 (10, 10, 10)	Charleston	"One Shot" — Hunter Hayes	Safe
Joe & Jenna	21 (7, 7, 7)	Tango	"Burning Man" — Dierks Bentley, feat. Brothers Osborne	Safe
Milo & Witney	29 (10, 9, 10)	Foxtrot	"Born to Love You" — LANCO	Safe
DeMarcus & Lindsay	27 (9, 9, 9)	Viennese waltz	"Tennessee Whiskey" — Chris Stapleton	Eliminated
Alexis & Alan	29 (9, 10, 10)	Samba	"Ladies in the ’90s" — Lauren Alaina	Safe
Bobby & Sharna	24 (8, 8, 8)	Viennese waltz	"Can't Help Falling in Love" — Chris Janson	Safe
Bobby & Sharna Evanna & Keo John & Emma Milo & Witney	29 (10, 9, 10)	Freestyle (Team HayNow)	"9 to 5" — Dolly Parton	
Alexis & Alan DeMarcus & Lindsay Joe & Jenna Juan Pablo & Cheryl	26 (9, 8, 9)	Freestyle (Team JoeDown)	"Country Girl (Shake It for Me)" — Luke Bryan	

=== Week 8: Semifinals ===
The couples performed an unlearned dance dedicated to a meaningful person in their life. Afterward, the couples performed their week 1 dance styles to a new song that was coached by one of the three judges. Couples are listed in the order they performed. Two couples were sent home at the end of the night in a double elimination.

Couple	Judge	Scores	Dance	Music	Result
Bobby & Sharna	Len Goodman	21 (7, 7, 7)	Salsa	"G.D.F.R." — Flo Rida	Safe
Bobby & Sharna	Len Goodman	24 (8, 8, 8)	Jive	"Gimme Some Lovin'" — The Spencer Davis Group	Safe
Alexis & Alan	Bruno Tonioli	28 (9, 9, 10)	Waltz	"Water" — Bishop Briggs	Safe
Alexis & Alan	Bruno Tonioli	30 (10, 10, 10)	Jive	"Yes" — Merry Clayton	Safe
Joe & Jenna	Carrie Ann Inaba	22 (8, 7, 7)	Contemporary	"This Year's Love" — David Gray	Eliminated
Joe & Jenna	Carrie Ann Inaba	24 (8, 8, 8)	Quickstep	"Check it Out" — Oh the Larceny	Eliminated
Juan Pablo & Cheryl	Bruno Tonioli	30 (10, 10, 10)	Argentine tango	"Libertango" — from Forever Tango	Eliminated
Juan Pablo & Cheryl	Bruno Tonioli	30 (10, 10, 10)	Salsa	"Tu Sonrisa" — Elvis Crespo	Eliminated
Evanna & Keo	Len Goodman	30 (10, 10, 10)	Contemporary	"Stand Up for Something" — Andra Day & Common	Safe
Evanna & Keo	Len Goodman	28 (10, 9, 9)	Foxtrot	"Rewrite the Stars" — Zac Efron & Zendaya	Safe
Milo & Witney	Carrie Ann Inaba	27 (9, 9, 9)	Argentine tango	"Pray for Me" — The Weeknd & Kendrick Lamar	Safe
Milo & Witney	Carrie Ann Inaba	28 (9, 9, 10)	Cha-cha-cha	"Good Feeling" — Austin French	Safe

=== Week 9: Finals ===
The couples performed their favorite dance of the season and their freestyle routine. Couples are listed in the order they performed.

Couple	Scores	Dance	Music	Result
Alexis & Alan	27 (9, 9, 9)	Argentine tango	"Swan Lake Suite" — Ray Chew	Fourth place
Alexis & Alan	30 (10, 10, 10)	Freestyle	"Head Above Water" — Avril Lavigne	Fourth place
Bobby & Sharna	24 (8, 8, 8)	Cha-cha-cha	"U Can't Touch This" — MC Hammer	Winners
Bobby & Sharna	30 (10, 10, 10)	Freestyle	"The Greatest Show" — Panic! at the Disco	Winners
Evanna & Keo	30 (10, 10, 10)	Tango	"Disturbia" — Rihanna	Third place
Evanna & Keo	30 (10, 10, 10)	Freestyle	"It's Oh So Quiet" — Björk	Third place
Milo & Witney	30 (10, 10, 10)	Charleston	"Living in New York City" — Robin Thicke	Runners-up
Milo & Witney	30 (10, 10, 10)	Freestyle	"Ain't No Sunshine" (Lido remix) — Bill Withers	Runners-up

== Dance chart ==
The couples performed the following each week:

- Week 1: One unlearned dance
- Week 2 (Night 1): One unlearned dance
- Week 2 (Night 2): One unlearned dance
- Week 3: One unlearned dance
- Week 4: One unlearned dance
- Week 5: One unlearned dance
- Week 6: One unlearned dance
- Week 7: One unlearned dance & team dance
- Week 8 (Semifinals): One unlearned dance & judge's choice
- Week 9 (Finals): Favorite dance & freestyle

Color key:

No scores received

Dancing with the Stars (season 27) - Dance chart
Couple	Week													
Couple	1		2		3	4	5	6	7		8		9	
Couple	Night 1	Night 2	Night 1	Night 2	3	4	5	6	7		8		9	
Bobby & Sharna	Jive		Foxtrot	Quickstep	Contemp.	Cha-cha-cha	Waltz	Argentine tango	Viennese waltz	Team Freestyle	Salsa	Jive	Cha-cha-cha	Freestyle
Milo & Witney	Cha-cha-cha		Charleston	Tango	Jive	Salsa	Quickstep	Contemp.	Foxtrot	Team Freestyle	Argentine tango	Cha-cha-cha	Charleston	Freestyle
Evanna & Keo	Foxtrot		Samba	Jive	Viennese waltz	Salsa	Jazz	Tango	Rumba	Team Freestyle	Contemp.	Foxtrot	Tango	Freestyle
Alexis & Alan	Jive	Jive	Argentine tango	Salsa	Contemp.	Tango	Foxtrot	Jazz	Samba	Team Freestyle	Waltz	Jive	Argentine tango	Freestyle
Joe & Jenna	Quickstep		Foxtrot	Jazz	Viennese waltz	Salsa	Jive	Argentine tango	Tango	Team Freestyle	Contemp.	Quickstep		Salsa (Note: No scores were received for this dance.)
Juan Pablo & Cheryl	Salsa		Quickstep	Foxtrot	Samba	Cha-cha-cha	Viennese waltz	Jive	Charleston	Team Freestyle	Argentine tango	Salsa		Argentine tango
John & Emma	Foxtrot		Charleston	Jive	Waltz	Argentine tango	Quickstep	Paso doble	Jazz	Team Freestyle				
DeMarcus & Lindsay	Cha-cha-cha		Foxtrot	Quickstep	Argentine tango	Paso doble	Charleston	Salsa	Viennese waltz	Team Freestyle				
Mary Lou & Sasha	Cha-cha-cha	Cha-cha-cha	Waltz	Samba	Viennese waltz	Charleston	Contemp.	Tango						
Tinashe & Brandon	Jive		Argentine tango	Cha-cha-cha	Rumba	Tango								
Nancy & Val	Quickstep	Quickstep	Cha-cha-cha	Paso doble	Rumba									
Danelle & Artem	Foxtrot	Foxtrot	Cha-cha-cha	Quickstep										
Nikki & Gleb	Salsa	Salsa												
