= Keo Motsepe =

South African dancer (born 1989)

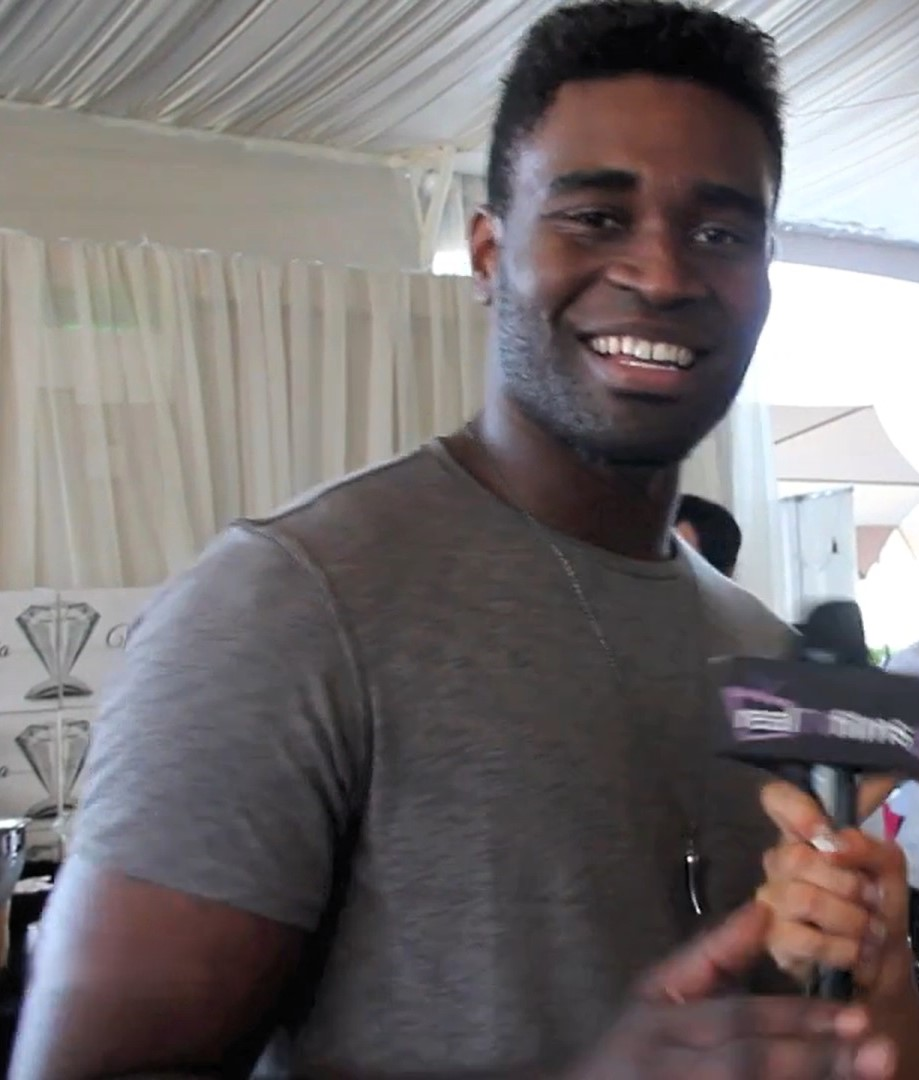
- Motsepe in 2015
- Born: Keoikantse Motsepe; 24 November 1989 (age 36); Pretoria, South Africa
- Occupation: Dancer
- Employer: ABC
- Television: Dancing with the Stars

Keoikantse Motsepe (born 24 November 1989) is a South African dancer. His dancing styles are Latin and Ballroom. He is known for being the first black professional dancer on the ABC show Dancing with the Stars.

== Life and career ==
Motsepe started his career at 11 years of age by entering into a competitive dance scene representing his country. In 2012, Motsepe joined the cast of Burn the Floor. In 2014, it was announced that Motsepe would join the cast of pro dancers on Dancing with the Stars.

=== Dancing with the Stars ===
In season 19, Motsepe was paired up with Olympic athlete Lolo Jones. They were eliminated during the first week of competition, finishing in 13th place.

In season 20, Motsepe was paired up with model Charlotte McKinney. They were eliminated in the third week of competition, finishing in 11th place.

For season 21, he paired with Grammy Award-winning singer Chaka Khan. They were the first couple eliminated on the second week of competition, finishing in 13th place.

For season 22, he was partnered with Full House and Fuller House actress Jodie Sweetin. The couple was eliminated in the eighth week of competition, despite being at the top of the leader board that week. They placed 6th overall. In a surprise challenge, judge Bruno Tonioli worked with Sweetin and eventual-winner Nyle DiMarco and their professional partners. During the sequence, the two celebrities swapped partners, seeing DiMarco and Motsepe dance the tango in ballroom hold, with both men shirtless, and Motsepe lift and twirl DiMarco. This was the first same-sex dancing included in the show's franchise world-wide.

He returned to season 23 but as a troupe member.

For season 24, he returned as a pro dancer and was partnered with actress & comedian Charo. They were eliminated in the third week of competition, finishing in 11th place.

Motsepe returned for season 25 and was paired with Shark Tank panelist, Barbara Corcoran. They were the first couple eliminated on the second week of competition, finishing in 13th place.

For season 26, he was partnered with former Olympic softball pitcher Jennie Finch Daigle. They were eliminated on the third week of competition and finished in 4th place, tying with Chris Mazdzer and Mirai Nagasu and partners Witney Carson and Alan Bersten.

For season 27, he was paired with Harry Potter actress Evanna Lynch. The couple made it to the finals where they finished in 3rd place, marking Motsepe's best so far and also his first time in the finale.

Motsepe appeared in season 28 as a pro dancer, but was not paired with a celebrity. He returned to compete again on season 29 where he is partnered with actress Anne Heche. They were eliminated in the fourth week of competition and finished in 13th place.

Season	Partner	Place	Average Score
19	Lolo Jones	13th	26.0/40
20	Charlotte McKinney	11th	27.3/40
21	Chaka Khan	13th	14.0/30
22	Jodie Sweetin	6th	25.8/30
24	Charo	11th	23.3/40
25	Barbara Corcoran	13th	16.5/30
26	Jennie Finch Daigle	4th	23.0/30
27	Evanna Lynch	3rd	27.1/30
29	Anne Heche	13th	18.8/30

=== With Lolo Jones ===
- Average: 26.0; placed 13th

Week	Dance	Song	Judges' score				Total	Result
Week	Dance	Song	Inaba	Goodman	J. Hough	Tonioli	Total	Result
1	Cha-cha-cha	"Tell Her" — Rizzle Kicks	6	6	7	7	26	Eliminated

=== With Charlotte McKinney ===
- Average: 27.3; placed 11th

Week	Dance	Song	Judges' score				Total	Result
Week	Dance	Song	Inaba	Goodman	J. Hough	Tonioli	Total	Result
1	Jive	"Shake a Tail Feather" — The Blues Brothers	7	7	7	6	27	No Elimination
2	Cha-cha-cha	"California Gurls" — Katy Perry, feat. Snoop Dogg	7	7	7	7	28	Safe
3	Rumba	"Empire" — Shakira	7	7	7	6	27	Eliminated

=== With Chaka Khan ===
- Average: 15.5; placed 13th

Week	Dance	Song	Judges' score			Total	Result
Week	Dance	Song	Inaba	J. Hough	Tonioli	Total	Result
1	Cha-cha-cha	"I Feel for You" — Chaka Khan	5	6	5	16	No Elimination
2	Foxtrot	"Chicago (That Toddlin' Town)" — Frank Sinatra	5	5	5	15	Eliminated

=== With Jodie Sweetin ===
- Average: 25.8; placed 6th

Week	Dance	Song	Judges' score			Total	Result
Week	Dance	Song	Inaba	Goodman	Tonioli	Total	Result
1	Tango	"Confident" — Demi Lovato	7	6	7	20	No Elimination
2	Samba	"Bun Up the Dance" — Dillon Francis & Skrillex	7	7	7	21	Safe
3	Foxtrot	"Rise Up" — Andra Day	8	7	8	23	Safe
4	Cha-cha-cha	"Try Everything" — Shakira	8	8	8	31 (Note: Jodie and Keo also received a score of 7 from guest judge Zendaya.)	Safe
5 (Note: Week 5 was switch-up week. Jodie danced with Val Chmerkovskiy, while Keo danced with Kim Fields. Jodie's scores with Val went towards her overall score with Keo.)	Paso doble	"Under Control" — Calvin Harris & Alesso, feat. Hurts	9	10	9	37 (Note: Jodie and Val also received a score of 9 from guest judge Maksim Chmerkovskiy.)	No Elimination
5	Viennese waltz	"These Arms of Mine" — Otis Redding	8	8	8	30 (Note: Kim and Keo also received a score of 6 from guest judge Maksim Chmerkovskiy.)	No Elimination
6	Contemporary	"Try" — Pink	9	10	10	29	Safe
7	Quickstep	"For Once in My Life" — Stevie Wonder	10	9	9	28	Safe
7	Team Freestyle	"End of Time" "If I Were a Boy" "Crazy in Love" — Beyoncé	10	9	9	28	Safe
8	Jive	"Something's Got a Hold on Me" — Etta James	10	10	10	30	Eliminated
8	Team-up Argentine tango	"Habanera" — Georges Bizet	10	10	9 (Note: Bruno Tonioli was the coach for the team-up dance and therefore did not score it. Instead, the general public gave the dance a score of 9.)	29	Eliminated

=== With Charo ===
- Average: 23.3; placed 11th

Week	Dance	Song	Judges' score				Total	Result
Week	Dance	Song	Inaba	Goodman	J. Hough	Tonioli	Total	Result
1	Salsa	"Cuban Pete" — Mambo Compañeros	6	5	5	5	21	No Elimination
2	Paso doble	"España cañí" — Charo	6	6	7	6	25	Safe
3	Foxtrot	"Chapel of Love" — The Dixie Cups	6	6	6	6	24	Eliminated

=== With Barbara Corcoran ===
- Average: 16.5; placed 13th

Week	Dance	Song	Judges' score			Total	Result
Week	Dance	Song	Inaba	Goodman	Tonioli	Total	Result
1	Salsa	"Money Maker" — Ludacris, feat. Pharrell Williams	5	6	5	16	No Elimination
2	Tango	"Whatever Lola Wants" — Sarah Vaughan	6	5	6	17	Eliminated

=== With Jennie Finch Daigle ===
- Average: 23.0; placed 4th

Week	Dance	Song	Judges' score			Total	Result
Week	Dance	Song	Inaba	Goodman	Tonioli	Total	Result
1	Foxtrot	"All-American Girl" — Carrie Underwood	7	8	7	22	Safe
2	Cha-cha-cha	"Do It Like This" — Daphne Willis	7	7	7	28 (Note: Jennie and Keo also received a score of 7 from guest judge Rashad Jennings.)	Safe
2	Team Freestyle	"Instant Replay" — Dan Hartman	9	9	9	37 (Note: The team dance also received a score of 10 from guest judge Rashad Jennings.)	Safe
3	Viennese waltz	"The Rest of Our Life" — Tim McGraw & Faith Hill	7	8	7	30 (Note: Jennie and Keo also received a score of 8 from guest judge David Ross.)	Eliminated
3	Cha-cha-cha Dance-off	"Dance" — DNCE	Loser			0 (Note: Jennie & Keo received a vote from guest judge David Ross, plus the public vote (60%), but lost the dance-off.)	Eliminated

=== With Evanna Lynch ===
- Average: 27.1; placed 3rd

Week	Dance	Song	Judges' score			Total	Result
Week	Dance	Song	Inaba	Goodman	Tonioli	Total	Result
1	Foxtrot	"Do You Believe in Magic" — Aly & AJ	7	7	6	20	Safe
2	Samba	"Can't Touch It" — Ricki-Lee Coulter	7	8	8	23	No Elimination
2	Jive	"Heat Wave" — Martha and the Vandellas	8	10	9	27	Safe
3	Viennese waltz	"Hedwig's Theme" — John Williams	9	9	9	27	Safe
4	Salsa	"Black Magic" — Little Mix	8	9	8	25	Safe
5	Jazz	"When Will My Life Begin?" — Mandy Moore	8	9	8	25	No Elimination
6	Tango	"Disturbia" — Rihanna	10	9	10	29	Safe
7	Rumba	"Every Little Thing" — Carly Pearce	10	9	10	29	Safe
7	Team Freestyle	"9 to 5" — Dolly Parton	10	9	10	29	Safe
8	Contemporary	"Stand Up for Something" — Andra Day & Common	10	10	10	30	Safe
8	Foxtrot	"Rewrite the Stars" — Zac Efron & Zendaya	10	9	9	28	Safe
9	Tango	"Disturbia" — Rihanna	10	10	10	30	Third Place
9	Freestyle	"It's Oh So Quiet" — Björk	10	10	10	30	Third Place

=== With Anne Heche ===
- Average: 18.8; placed 13th

Week	Dance	Song	Judges' score			Total	Result
Week	Dance	Song	Inaba	D. Hough	Tonioli	Total	Result
1	Cha-cha-cha	"Don't Start Now" — Dua Lipa	4	5	6	15	No Elimination
2	Foxtrot	"Counting Stars" — OneRepublic	6	7	6	19	Safe
3	Quickstep	"Zero to Hero" — Ariana Grande	7	5	7	19	Bottom Two
4	Paso doble	"Rise" — Katy Perry	8	7	7	22	Eliminated

== Notes ==
Awards and achievements
Preceded by Tamar Braxton & Valentin Chmerkovskiy	Dancing with the Stars (US) quarter-finalists Season 22 (Spring 2016 with Jodie Sweetin)	Succeeded by Marilu Henner & Derek Hough
Preceded by Diana Nyad & Henry Byalikov; Redfoo & Emma Slater; Chris Kattan & Witney Carson	Dancing with the Stars (US) last place Season 19 (Fall 2014 with Lolo Jones); Season 21 (Fall 2015 with Chaka Khan); Season 25 (Fall 2017 with Barbara Corcoran)	Succeeded by Redfoo & Emma Slater; Geraldo Rivera & Edyta Śliwińska; Jamie Anderson & Artem Chigvintsev; Johnny Damon & Emma Slater
