= Dancing with the Stars (American TV series) season 24 =

Dancing with the Stars
- Season 24
- Promotional poster featuring pro dancers Witney Carson and Valentin Chmerkovskiy
- Hosted by: Tom Bergeron; Erin Andrews
- Judges: Carrie Ann Inaba; Len Goodman; Bruno Tonioli; Julianne Hough
- Celebrity winner: Rashad Jennings
- Professional winner: Emma Slater
- No. of episodes: 11

Release
- Original network: ABC
- Original release: March 20 – May 23, 2017

Season chronology
- ← Previous; Season 23 Next → Season 25

Season twenty-four of Dancing with the Stars premiered on March 20, 2017, on the ABC network.

On May 23, 2017, former NFL running back Rashad Jennings and Emma Slater were crowned the champions, while former MLB catcher David Ross and Lindsay Arnold finished in second place, and Fifth Harmony singer Normani and Val Chmerkovskiy finished in third.

== Cast ==
=== Couples ===
This season featured twelve celebrity contestants. On February 21, 2017, Maksim Chmerkovskiy and Peta Murgatroyd were announced as the first two professionals returning this season. In the following days, Lindsay Arnold, Sharna Burgess, Witney Carson, Artem Chigvintsev, Valentin Chmerkovskiy, Sasha Farber, Gleb Savchenko, and Emma Slater were all confirmed as professional dancers. In addition, Kym Herjavec (who last competed in season 20) and Keo Motsepe (who last competed in season 22) were also confirmed as returning as professional dancers.

The full cast was announced on Good Morning America on March 1, 2017.

Celebrity	Notability	Professional partner	Status	Ref.
Chris Kattan	Actor & comedian	Witney Carson	Eliminated 1st on March 27, 2017	
Charo	Actress, comedian & musician	Keo Motsepe	Eliminated 2nd on April 3, 2017	
Mr. T	Actor & wrestler	Kym Herjavec	Eliminated 3rd on April 10, 2017	
Erika Jayne	Singer & reality television personality	Gleb Savchenko	Eliminated 4th on April 17, 2017	
Heather Morris	Glee actress & dancer	Maksim Chmerkovskiy; Alan Bersten (Weeks 2-5)	Eliminated 5th on April 24, 2017	
Nancy Kerrigan	Olympic figure skater	Artem Chigvintsev	Eliminated 6th & 7th on May 1, 2017	
Nick Viall	The Bachelor star	Peta Murgatroyd	Eliminated 6th & 7th on May 1, 2017	
Bonner Bolton	Model & bull rider	Sharna Burgess	Eliminated 8th on May 8, 2017	
Simone Biles	Olympic artistic gymnast	Sasha Farber	Eliminated 9th on May 15, 2017	
Normani	Fifth Harmony singer	Valentin Chmerkovskiy	Third place on May 23, 2017	
David Ross	MLB catcher	Lindsay Arnold	Runners-up on May 23, 2017	
Rashad Jennings	NFL running back	Emma Slater	Winners on May 23, 2017	

=== Hosts and judges ===
Tom Bergeron and Erin Andrews returned as hosts, while Carrie Ann Inaba, Len Goodman, Julianne Hough, and Bruno Tonioli returned as judges. On April 24, former contestant Nick Carter joined the panel as a guest judge, filling in for Hough. On May 1, choreographer Mandy Moore also filled in for Hough as a guest judge.

=== Dance troupe ===
The troupe consisted of returning pros Alan Bersten, Brittany Cherry, Hayley Erbert, Britt Stewart, and new pros Artur Adamski and Brandon Armstrong.

== Episodes ==
No. overall	No. in season	Title	Rating (18–49)	Original release date	U.S. viewers (millions)
400	1	"First Dances/400th Episode Week"	2.07	March 20, 2017	12.09
401	2	"First Elimination"	1.68	March 27, 2017	11.12
402	3	"Vegas Night"	1.55	April 3, 2017	10.48
403	4	"Most Memorable Year Night"	1.56	April 10, 2017	10.31
404	5	"Disney Night"	1.77	April 17, 2017	11.18
405	6	"Boy Bands vs. Girl Groups Night"	1.64	April 24, 2017	10.35
406	7	"A Night at the Movies"	1.61	May 1, 2017	10.31
407	8	"Quarterfinals"	1.50	May 8, 2017	9.95
408	9	"Semifinals"	1.46	May 15, 2017	10.07
409	10	"Finals: Night 1"	1.79	May 22, 2017	10.54
410	11	"Finals: Night 2"	1.35	May 23, 2017	8.91

== Scoring chart ==
The highest score each week is indicated in bold green with a dagger (†), while the lowest score each week is indicated in italicized red with a double-dagger (‡).

Color key:

Winners
Runners-up
Third place
Eliminated

Dancing with the Stars (season 24) - Weekly scores
Couple	Pl.	Week											
Couple	Pl.	1	2	1+2	3	4	5	6	7	8	9	10	
Couple	Pl.	1	2	1+2	3	4	5	6	7	8	9	Night 1	Night 2
Rashad & Emma	1st	31	**32**†	**63**†	28	**39**†	32	37+33=70	37+2=39	36+39=75	38+39=77	40+40=**80**†	+39=**119**† (Note: This couple finished in first place.)
David & Lindsay	2nd	28	27	55	31	31	29‡	29+33=62	32	36+29=65	34+36=70‡	33+40=73‡	+36=109‡ (Note: This couple finished in second place.)
Normani & Val	3rd	27	**32**†	59	**34**†	32	**39**†	38+34=72	40+3=**43**†	40+39=**79**†	36+40=76	38+40=78	+40=118 (Note: This couple finished in third place.)
Simone & Sasha	4th	**32**†	29	61	32	36	38	35+34=69	37+2=39	36+36=72	40+40=**80**† (Note: This couple was eliminated.)		
Bonner & Sharna	5th	22	29	51	24‡	32	30	30+33=63	29+2=31‡	30+28=58‡			
Nancy & Artem	6th	28	28	56	33	33	36	33+34=67	36				
Nick & Peta	6th	24	25	49	26	30	34	28+33=61‡	34				
Heather & Maks	8th	28	30	58	33	35	34	40+34=**74**†					
Erika & Gleb	9th	24	28	52	26	30	32						
Mr. T & Kym	10th	20	22‡	42	24‡	28‡							
Charo & Keo	11th	21	25	46	24‡								
Chris & Witney	12th	17‡	22‡	39‡									

== Weekly scores ==
Individual judges' scores in the charts below (given in parentheses) are listed in this order from left to right: Carrie Ann Inaba, Len Goodman, Julianne Hough, Bruno Tonioli.

=== Week 1: First Dances/400th Episode Week ===
Couples are listed in the order they performed.

Couple	Scores	Dance	Music
Normani & Val	27 (7, 6, 7, 7)	Quickstep	"Good Time Good Life" — Erin Bowman
Nancy & Artem	28 (7, 7, 7, 7)	Viennese waltz	"She's Always a Woman" — Billy Joel
Chris & Witney	17 (5, 4, 4, 4)	Cha-cha-cha	"What Is Love" — Haddaway
Bonner & Sharna	22 (6, 5, 5, 6)	Cha-cha-cha	"Move" — Luke Bryan
Charo & Keo	21 (6, 5, 5, 5)	Salsa	"Cuban Pete" — Mambo Compañeros
Nick & Peta	24 (6, 6, 6, 6)	Cha-cha-cha	"Let Me Love You (Tiësto Remix)" — DJ Snake, feat. Justin Bieber
Heather & Maks	28 (7, 7, 7, 7)	Viennese waltz	"Make Something Beautiful" — Ben Rector
David & Lindsay	28 (7, 7, 7, 7)	Quickstep	"Go, Cubs, Go" — Steve Goodman
Erika & Gleb	24 (6, 6, 6, 6)	Salsa	"XXPEN$IVE" — Erika Jayne
Rashad & Emma	31 (8, 7, 8, 8)	Cha-cha-cha	"24K Magic" — Bruno Mars
Mr. T & Kym	20 (5, 5, 5, 5)	Cha-cha-cha	"The A-Team theme" — Mike Post, Pete Carpenter & The Daniel Caine Orchestra
Simone & Sasha	32 (8, 8, 8, 8)	Tango	"Untouchable" — Tritonal & Cash Cash, feat. JHart

=== Week 2: First Elimination ===
The couples performed one unlearned dance, and are listed in the order they performed.

Due to an injury, Maksim Chmerkovskiy was unable to perform, so Heather Morris performed with Alan Bersten instead.

Couple	Scores	Dance	Music	Result
Nancy & Artem	28 (7, 7, 7, 7)	Cha-cha-cha	"No Rights No Wrongs" — Jess Glynne	Safe
Erika & Gleb	28 (7, 7, 7, 7)	Foxtrot	"Bad Intentions" — Niykee Heaton	Safe
Charo & Keo	25 (6, 6, 7, 6)	Paso doble	"España cañí" — Charo	Safe
Nick & Peta	25 (7, 5, 7, 6)	Foxtrot	"Love Me Now" — John Legend	Safe
Heather & Alan	30 (8, 6, 8, 8)	Jive	"Grown" — Little Mix	Safe
Bonner & Sharna	29 (8, 6, 8, 7)	Viennese waltz	"Unlove You" — Jennifer Nettles	Safe
Simone & Sasha	29 (7, 7, 7, 8)	Cha-cha-cha	"Burnin' Up" — Jessie J, feat. 2 Chainz	Safe
Chris & Witney	22 (6, 5, 6, 5)	Jazz	"Hey Ya!" — OutKast	Eliminated
Normani & Val	32 (8, 8, 8, 8)	Cha-cha-cha	"Give Me Your Love" — Sigala, feat. John Newman & Nile Rodgers	Safe
Rashad & Emma	32 (8, 8, 8, 8)	Viennese waltz	"Suffer" — Charlie Puth	Safe
Mr. T & Kym	22 (6, 5, 6, 5)	Paso doble	"Eye of the Tiger" — Survivor	Safe
David & Lindsay	27 (7, 6, 7, 7)	Cha-cha-cha	"Bust a Move" — Young MC	Safe

=== Week 3: Vegas Night ===
The couples performed one unlearned dance that paid tribute to the sights and sounds of Las Vegas. Couples are listed in the order they performed.

For the second consecutive week, Heather Morris performed with Alan Bersten.

Couple	Scores	Dance	Music	Result
Nick & Peta	26 (7, 6, 7, 6)	Tango	"Poker Face" — Lady Gaga	Safe
Mr. T & Kym	24 (6, 6, 6, 6)	Foxtrot	"Ain't That a Kick in the Head?" — Robbie Williams	Safe
Bonner & Sharna	24 (6, 6, 6, 6)	Charleston	"A Little Party Never Killed Nobody" — Fergie, Q-Tip & GoonRock	Safe
Heather & Alan	33 (9, 8, 8, 8)	Tango	"Toxic" — Britney Spears	Safe
Charo & Keo	24 (6, 6, 6, 6)	Foxtrot	"Chapel of Love" — The Dixie Cups	Eliminated
Simone & Sasha	32 (7, 8, 9, 8)	Quickstep	"Viva Las Vegas" — Elvis Presley	Safe
Nancy & Artem	33 (8, 9, 8, 8)	Samba	"Shake Your Bon-Bon" — Ricky Martin	Safe
David & Lindsay	31 (8, 7, 8, 8)	Jazz	"Candy Shop" — 50 Cent, feat. Olivia	Safe
Erika & Gleb	26 (6, 7, 7, 6)	Jive	"Take Me to Heaven" — Alan Menken & Glenn Slater	Safe
Rashad & Emma	28 (7, 7, 7, 7)	Samba	"Swalla" — Jason Derulo, feat. Nicki Minaj & Ty Dolla Sign	Safe
Normani & Val	34 (8, 8, 9, 9)	Foxtrot	"Big Spender" — Shirley Bassey	Safe

=== Week 4: Most Memorable Year Night ===
The couples performed one unlearned dance to celebrate the most memorable year of their lives. Couples are listed in the order they performed.

For the third consecutive week, Heather Morris again danced with Alan Bersten.

Couple	Scores	Dance	Music	Result
Normani & Val	32 (8, 7, 8, 9)	Rumba	"Impossible" — Fifth Harmony	Safe
Nick & Peta	30 (8, 7, 8, 7)	Rumba	"Shape of You" — Ed Sheeran	Safe
Nancy & Artem	33 (8, 9, 8, 8)	Foxtrot	"My Wish" — Rascal Flatts	Safe
Mr. T & Kym	28 (7, 7, 7, 7)	Waltz	"Amazing Grace" — Ray Chew	Eliminated
Heather & Alan	35 (8, 9, 9, 9)	Cha-cha-cha	"Shut Up and Dance" — Walk the Moon	Safe
David & Lindsay	31 (7, 8, 8, 8)	Viennese waltz	"Forever Young" — Youth Group	Safe
Rashad & Emma	39 (10, 9, 10, 10)	Contemporary	"Unconditionally" — Katy Perry	Safe
Erika & Gleb	30 (8, 7, 7, 8)	Cha-cha-cha	"Express Yourself" — Madonna	Safe
Simone & Sasha	36 (9, 9, 9, 9)	Viennese waltz	"Good Good Father" — Chris Tomlin	Safe
Bonner & Sharna	32 (8, 8, 8, 8)	Foxtrot	"Feeling Good" — Michael Bublé	Safe

=== Week 5: Disney Night ===
The couples performed one unlearned dance to a song from a Disney film, and are listed in the order they performed.

This was the fourth and final week that Heather Morris danced with Alan Bersten.

Couple	Scores	Dance	Music	Disney film	Result
Rashad & Emma	32 (7, 8, 9, 8)	Foxtrot	"Evermore" — Josh Groban	Beauty and the Beast	Safe
Nick & Peta	34 (9, 8, 9, 8)	Jazz	"I've Got No Strings" — Dickie Jones	Pinocchio	Safe
Erika & Gleb	32 (8, 8, 8, 8)	Viennese waltz	"Unforgettable" — Sia	Finding Dory	Eliminated
Heather & Alan	34 (8, 8, 9, 9)	Jazz	"For the First Time in Forever" — Kristen Bell & Idina Menzel	Frozen	Safe
Bonner & Sharna	30 (7, 8, 8, 7)	Tango	"When Can I See You Again?" — Owl City	Wreck-It Ralph	Safe
Normani & Val	39 (10, 9, 10, 10)	Paso doble	"I'll Make a Man Out of You" — Donny Osmond (performed live)	Mulan	Safe
David & Lindsay	29 (7, 7, 8, 7)	Jive	"Ride" — ZZ Ward	Cars 3	Safe
Nancy & Artem	36 (9, 9, 9, 9)	Jazz	"That's How You Know" — Amy Adams	Enchanted	Safe
Simone & Sasha	38 (9, 9, 10, 10)	Contemporary	"How Far I'll Go" — Auliʻi Cravalho (performed live)	Moana	Safe

=== Week 6: Boy Bands vs. Girl Groups Night ===
Individual judges' scores in the chart below (given in parentheses) are listed in this order from left to right: Carrie Ann Inaba, Nick Carter, Len Goodman, Bruno Tonioli.

The couples performed one unlearned dance and a team dance to songs from popular boy bands and girl groups. Couples are listed in the order they performed.

Couple	Scores	Dance	Music	Result
Simone & Sasha	35 (9, 8, 9, 9)	Samba	"Survivor" — Destiny's Child	Safe
Bonner & Sharna	30 (8, 8, 7, 7)	Rumba	"I Want It That Way" — Backstreet Boys	Safe
Nancy & Artem	33 (9, 8, 8, 8)	Paso doble	"Free Your Mind" — En Vogue	Safe
Nick & Peta	28 (7, 7, 7, 7)	Jive	"Fun, Fun, Fun" — The Beach Boys	Safe
Normani & Val	38 (10, 10, 8, 10)	Salsa	"When I Grow Up" — The Pussycat Dolls	Safe
David & Lindsay	29 (7, 8, 7, 7)	Argentine tango	"I Want You Back" — NSYNC	Safe
Rashad & Emma	37 (9, 10, 9, 9)	Tango	"Reach Out I'll Be There" — The Four Tops	Safe
Heather & Maks	40 (10, 10, 10, 10)	Rumba	"Waterfalls" — TLC	Eliminated
Bonner & Sharna David & Lindsay Nick & Peta Rashad & Emma	33 (8, 9, 8, 8)	Freestyle (Team Boy Band)	"Dancing Machine" — The Jackson 5, "You Got It (The Right Stuff)" — New Kids on the Block & "Best Song Ever" — One Direction	
Heather & Maks Nancy & Artem Normani & Val Simone & Sasha	34 (8, 9, 8, 9)	Freestyle (Team Girl Group)	"My Boyfriend's Back" — The Chiffons, "No Scrubs" — TLC & "Bo$$" — Fifth Harmony	

=== Week 7: A Night at the Movies ===
Individual judges' scores in the chart below (given in parentheses) are listed in this order from left to right: Carrie Ann Inaba, Len Goodman, Mandy Moore, Bruno Tonioli.

The couples performed one unlearned dance, capturing the spirit of a specific movie genre. The couple with the highest score earned immunity from elimination, while the rest of the couples participated in dance-offs for extra points. Couples are listed in the order they performed. Two couples were eliminated at the end of the night.

Couple	Scores	Dance	Music	Genre	Result
Bonner & Sharna	29 (7, 7, 8, 7)	Paso doble	"Hoedown" — Aaron Copland	Western	Safe
Nancy & Artem	36 (9, 9, 9, 9)	Tango	"Oh, Pretty Woman" — Roy Orbison	Romance	Eliminated
Simone & Sasha	37 (10, 9, 9, 9)	Charleston	"Charleston" — Bob Wilson and his Varsity Rhythm Boys	Silent	Safe
Nick & Peta	34 (8, 8, 9, 9)	Argentine tango	"Dangerous" — David Guetta, feat. Sam Martin	Action	Eliminated
Rashad & Emma	37 (9, 9, 10, 9)	Paso doble	"O Fortuna" — Carl Orff	Horror	Safe
David & Lindsay	32 (8, 8, 8, 8)	Salsa	"Universal Mind Control" — Common, feat. Pharrell Williams	Sci-fi	Safe
Normani & Val	40 (10, 10, 10, 10)	Argentine tango	"Quizás, Quizás, Quizás" — Andrea Bocelli, feat. Jennifer Lopez	Foreign	Immunity

For each dance-off, the couple with the highest remaining score picked the opponent against whom they wanted to dance; the chosen opponent was allowed to pick the dance style (cha-cha-cha, jive, or rumba). The winner of each dance-off earned two points.

Dance-offs
Couple	Dance	Music	Result
Simone & Sasha (Note: Simone & Sasha received votes from all four judges, plus the public vote (63%).)	Cha-cha-cha	"Crave" — Pharrell Williams	Winners
Nancy & Artem	Cha-cha-cha	"Crave" — Pharrell Williams	Losers
Rashad & Emma (Note: Rashad & Emma received votes from all four judges, plus the public vote (54%).)	Jive	"Gimme Some Lovin'" — The Spencer Davis Group	Winners
David & Lindsay	Jive	"Gimme Some Lovin'" — The Spencer Davis Group	Losers
Bonner & Sharna (Note: Bonner & Sharna received votes from Carrie Ann, Len, and Mandy Moore, plus the public vote (62%).)	Rumba	"I Will Always Love You" — Whitney Houston	Winners
Nick & Peta (Note: Nick & Peta received a vote from Bruno.)	Rumba	"I Will Always Love You" — Whitney Houston	Losers

=== Week 8: Quarterfinals ===
The couples performed an unlearned dance to a song chosen by the pro to complement their celebrity partner's personality. Each couple also performed a trio dance involving an eliminated pro or a member of the troupe. Couples are listed in the order they performed.

Couple	Trio partner	Scores	Dance	Music	Result
Rashad & Emma	Witney Carson	36 (9, 9, 9, 9)	Jive	"Shake a Tail Feather" — The Blues Brothers	Safe
Rashad & Emma	Witney Carson	39 (10, 9, 10, 10)	Argentine tango	"Dreams" — Bastille, feat. Gabrielle Aplin	Safe
Normani & Val	Alan Bersten	40 (10, 10, 10, 10)	Contemporary	"Freedom" — Anthony Hamilton & Elayna Boynton	Safe
Normani & Val	Alan Bersten	39 (10, 9, 10, 10)	Jive	"Feeling Alive" — Earl St. Clair	Safe
Bonner & Sharna	Britt Stewart	30 (8, 7, 8, 7)	Argentine tango	"Believer" — Imagine Dragons	Eliminated
Bonner & Sharna	Britt Stewart	28 (7, 7, 7, 7)	Jazz	"That's What I Like" — Bruno Mars	Eliminated
Simone & Sasha	Brittany Cherry	36 (9, 9, 9, 9)	Foxtrot	"What Makes You Beautiful" — One Direction	Safe
Simone & Sasha	Brittany Cherry	36 (9, 9, 9, 9)	Paso doble	"Don't Let Me Down" — The Chainsmokers, feat. Daya	Safe
David & Lindsay	Hayley Erbert	36 (9, 9, 9, 9)	Waltz	"Humble and Kind" — Tim McGraw	Safe
David & Lindsay	Hayley Erbert	29 (7, 7, 8, 7)	Paso doble	"Gangsta's Paradise" — 2WEI	Safe

=== Week 9: Semifinals ===
The couples performed a dance coached by one of the four judges, as well as one unlearned dance. Couples are listed in the order they performed.

Couple	Judge	Scores	Dance	Music	Result
Normani & Val	Len Goodman	36 (9, 9, 9, 9)	Viennese waltz	"Desperado" — Rihanna	Safe
Normani & Val	Len Goodman	40 (10, 10, 10, 10)	Jazz	"What a Wonderful World" — Ray Chew	Safe
David & Lindsay	Julianne Hough	34 (9, 8, 9, 8)	Foxtrot	"You Make Me Feel So Young" — Michael Bublé	Safe
David & Lindsay	Julianne Hough	36 (9, 9, 9, 9)	Tango	"Castle on the Hill" — Ed Sheeran	Safe
Simone & Sasha	Carrie Ann Inaba	40 (10, 10, 10, 10)	Jive	"Faith" — Stevie Wonder, feat. Ariana Grande	Eliminated
Simone & Sasha	Carrie Ann Inaba	40 (10, 10, 10, 10)	Rumba	"Skyscraper" — Demi Lovato	Eliminated
Rashad & Emma	Bruno Tonioli	38 (9, 9, 10, 10)	Rumba	"Say You Won't Let Go" — James Arthur	Safe
Rashad & Emma	Bruno Tonioli	39 (10, 9, 10, 10)	Quickstep	"Yes I Can"—Sammy Davis Jr.	Safe

=== Week 10: Finals ===
On the first night, the couples performed a redemption dance and their freestyle routine. On the second night, the couples danced a fusion dance of two previously learned dance styles. Couples are listed in the order they performed.

Night 1

Couple	Scores	Dance	Music
David & Lindsay	33 (8, 8, 9, 8)	Viennese waltz	"Let's Hurt Tonight" — OneRepublic
David & Lindsay	40 (10, 10, 10, 10)	Freestyle	"It Takes Two" — Rob Base and DJ E-Z Rock "Take Me Out to the Ball Game" — Ronnie Neuman
Normani & Val	38 (10, 9, 9, 10)	Quickstep	"Check It Out" — Oh the Larceny
Normani & Val	40 (10, 10, 10, 10)	Freestyle	"What the World Needs Now Is Love" — Andra Day
Rashad & Emma	40 (10, 10, 10, 10)	Viennese waltz	"Dark Times" — The Weeknd, feat. Ed Sheeran
Rashad & Emma	40 (10, 10, 10, 10)	Freestyle	"Uptown Funk" — Mark Ronson, feat. Bruno Mars "Let's Go" — Trick Daddy, feat. Deuce Poppi, Tre + 6 & Unda Presha

Night 2

Couple	Scores	Dance	Music	Result
David & Lindsay	36 (9, 9, 9, 9)	Foxtrot & Salsa	"Living" —Bakermat, feat. Alex Clare	Runners-up
Normani & Val	40 (10, 10, 10, 10)	Argentine tango & Foxtrot	"There's Nothing Holdin' Me Back" — Shawn Mendes	Third place
Rashad & Emma	39 (10, 9, 10, 10)	Cha-cha-cha & Tango	"I Don't Like It, I Love It" — Flo Rida, feat. Robin Thicke & Verdine White	Winners

== Dance chart ==
The couples performed the following each week:

- Weeks 1–5: One unlearned dance
- Week 6: One unlearned dance & team dance
- Week 7: One unlearned dance & dance-off
- Week 8: One unlearned dance & trio dance
- Week 9 (Semifinals): Judges' challenge & one unlearned dance
- Week 10 (Finals, Night 1): Redemption dance & freestyle
- Week 10 (Finals, Night 2): Fusion dance

Color key:

No scores received

Dancing with the Stars (season 24) - Dance chart
Couple	Week																
Couple	1	2	3	4	5	6		7		8		9		10			
Couple	1	2	3	4	5	6		7		8		9		Night 1		Night 2	
Rashad & Emma	Cha-cha-cha	Viennese waltz	Samba	Contemp.	Foxtrot	Tango	Team Freestyle	Paso doble	Jive	Jive	Argentine tango	Rumba	Quickstep	Viennese waltz	Freestyle	Cha-cha-cha (Note: This couple danced, but received no scores.)	Cha-cha-cha & Tango
David & Lindsay	Quickstep	Cha-cha-cha	Jazz	Viennese waltz	Jive	Argentine tango	Team Freestyle	Salsa	Jive	Waltz	Paso doble	Foxtrot	Tango	Viennese waltz	Freestyle	Jazz	Foxtrot & Salsa
Normani & Val	Quickstep	Cha-cha-cha	Foxtrot	Rumba	Paso doble	Salsa	Team Freestyle	Argentine tango	Immunity	Contemp.	Jive	Viennese waltz	Jazz	Quickstep	Freestyle	Salsa	Argentine tango & Foxtrot
Simone & Sasha	Tango	Cha-cha-cha	Quickstep	Viennese waltz	Contemp.	Samba	Team Freestyle	Charleston	Cha-cha-cha	Foxtrot	Paso doble	Jive	Rumba				Contemp.
Bonner & Sharna	Cha-cha-cha	Viennese waltz	Charleston	Foxtrot	Tango	Rumba	Team Freestyle	Paso doble	Rumba	Argentine tango	Jazz						Cha-cha-cha
Nancy & Artem	Viennese waltz	Cha-cha-cha	Samba	Foxtrot	Jazz	Paso doble	Team Freestyle	Tango	Cha-cha-cha								Samba
Nick & Peta	Cha-cha-cha	Foxtrot	Tango	Rumba	Jazz	Jive	Team Freestyle	Argentine tango	Rumba								Rumba
Heather & Maks	Viennese waltz	Jive	Tango	Cha-cha-cha	Jazz	Rumba	Team Freestyle										Rumba
Erika & Gleb	Salsa	Foxtrot	Jive	Cha-cha-cha	Viennese waltz												
Mr. T & Kym	Cha-cha-cha	Paso doble	Foxtrot	Waltz													
Charo & Keo	Salsa	Paso doble	Foxtrot														
Chris & Witney	Cha-cha-cha	Jazz															
