= Joe Amabile =

American television personality

- Born: Joseph Anthony Amabile; April 12, 1986 (age 40); Chicago, Illinois
- Occupations: Television personality; Podcast host
- Years active: 2018–present
- Known for: The Bachelorette; Bachelor in Paradise
- Spouse: Serena Pitt (m. 2022)

Joseph Anthony Amabile also known as “Grocery Store Joe” (born April 12, 1986) is an American reality television personality. He is best known for his appearances on The Bachelorette and Bachelor in Paradise.

== Early life and education ==
Amabile was born on April 12, 1986, in Chicago, Illinois, to an Italian father and an Italian/Norwegian mother. He attended Holy Cross High School. He has one brother.

== Career ==
Amabile was a co-owner of Eric's Food Center in Chicago, Illinois, which earned him the nickname "Grocery Store Joe" when he appeared on The Bachelorette.

He hosted a podcast with Natasha Parker and Tia Booth called Click Bait with Bachelor Nation until May 2023. He currently hosts the Bachelor Happy Hour podcast with Serena Pitt.

=== The Bachelorette ===
Amabile was a contestant on Becca Kufrin's season of The Bachelorette. He was eliminated night 1.

=== Bachelor in Paradise ===
Amabile appeared on season 5 of Bachelor in Paradise in 2018. He split from his partner Kendall Long week 5. They got back together after filming wrapped and were together until January 2020. He returned for season 7 of Bachelor in Paradise in 2021. He proposed to Serena Pitt in the finale.

=== Dancing with the Stars ===
Amabile was announced as one of the celebrities to compete on season 27 of Dancing with the Stars. He was partnered with professional dancer Jenna Johnson. During week 4, another The Bachelorette cast member, Jordan Kimball, appeared in their dance for Trio's Night. They were eliminated on November 12, 2018, tying for 5th place. They performed their Trio Night routine in the finale with Jenna's husband Valentin Chmerkovskiy taking Jordan's place. Other Bachelor Nation alums danced with them as well including Wells Adams, Nick Viall, Eric Bigger, and Dean Unglert.

== Personal life ==
Amabile was in a relationship with Kendall Long from July 2018 to January 2020.

Amabile got engaged to Serena Pitt on June 26, 2021. They moved to New York City together in April 2022. They got married on October 27, 2022. They had their official wedding ceremony on September 2, 2023, in Charleston, South Carolina.

In July 2026, Amabile revealed that doctors discovered what appears to be an early-stage brain tumor after he underwent a full-body scan at Prenuvo.
