= DJ Kass =

American disc jockey

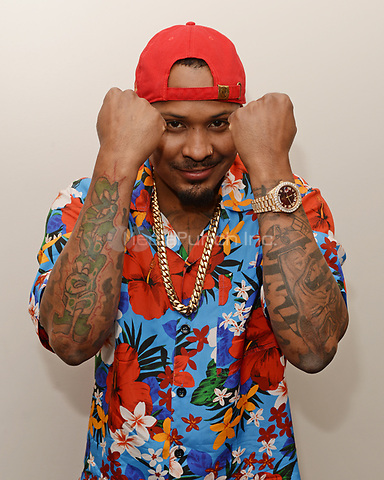
- DJ Kass at Hits 97.3

Background information
- Born: Luis Rosa; August 27, 1987 (age 38)
- Origin: New York City, New York, United States
- Genres: Reggaeton, dembow, hip hop
- Occupations: Disc jockey, recording artist
- Years active: 2017–present

Luis Rosa (born August 28, 1987), professionally known as DJ Kass, is a Dominican-American disc jockey and recording artist from the Bronx. His single “Scooby Doo Pa Pa” was referred to by E! Online as "the new dance craze that you need to know about" in 2018.

== Early life ==
Luis Rosa was born August 28, 1987, in the Dominican Republic and raised in the Bronx. His father was a DJ, and Rosa learned about different forms of music from him.

== Career ==
In 2013, DJ Kass began deejaying in various clubs in the Dyckman area of Inwood, Manhattan. He released his first single titled "Tamo Open Yo" in 2016. The song reached #2 on iTunes in the Dominican Republic and was officially remixed by El Alfa in 2017.

=== Scooby Doo Pa Pa ===
On September 12, 2017, DJ Kass released his single "Scooby Doo Pa Pa", whose lyrics are based on the song "Man's Not Hot" by Big Shaq. The single went viral when Lele Pons and Inanna Sarkis posted Instagram videos of them dancing to it in character as Daphne Blake and Velma Dinkley from the animated TV show.

"Scooby Doo Pa Pa" reached #9 on Billboard's Hot Latin chart the week of March 3, 2018 becoming the first song in the Dembow genre to reach the Top 10 on Billboard Latin.

On April 2, 2018, DJ Kass announced that an official "Scooby Doo Pa Pa" remix featuring Pitbull would be released. On April 19, the remix was performed live by DJ Kass and Pitbull at Alex Sensation's Miami Bash at the American Airlines Arena, being officially released on April 27, 2018.

In early May 2018, DJ Kass was charged with plagiarism by Dominican rapper Shelow Shaq and his producer, Topo, who note that "Scooby Doo Pa Pa" samples the bass line from Shelow Shaq's song "Tu Maldita Madre" (Your Damn Mother). The lawsuit led to the video being taken down from YouTube.

On May 21, 2018, "Scooby Doo Pa Pa" was featured on the finale of ABC's Dancing With The Stars, where Olympic ice skater Adam Rippon and Jenna Johnson performed their freestyle dance to it.
