= Dancing with the Stars (American TV series) season 22 =

Dancing with the Stars
- Season 22
- Promotional poster, featuring pro dancers Witney Carson and Keo Motsepe
- Hosted by: Tom Bergeron; Erin Andrews
- Judges: Carrie Ann Inaba; Len Goodman; Bruno Tonioli
- Celebrity winner: Nyle DiMarco
- Professional winner: Peta Murgatroyd
- No. of episodes: 11

Release
- Original network: ABC
- Original release: March 21 – May 24, 2016

Season chronology
- ← Previous; Season 21 Next → Season 23

Season twenty-two of Dancing with the Stars premiered March 21, 2016, on the ABC network.

On May 24, model Nyle DiMarco and Peta Murgatroyd were crowned champions, while UFC fighter Paige VanZant and Mark Ballas finished in second place, and Good Morning America meteorologist Ginger Zee and Valentin Chmerkovskiy finished third.

== Cast ==
=== Couples ===
This season featured twelve celebrity contestants. Edyta Śliwińska returned as a professional dancer after an eleven-season hiatus. Also returning to the pro roster were Artem Chigvintsev, Peta Murgatroyd, and Sasha Farber. Actress Jodie Sweetin was the first celebrity revealed on Good Morning America on March 2, 2016, while TV meteorologist Ginger Zee was also revealed on that show two days later. The remaining celebrities and professionals dancers were later revealed, also on Good Morning America, on March 8.

Celebrity	Notability	Professional partner	Status	Ref.
Geraldo Rivera	Journalist & talk show host	Edyta Śliwińska	Eliminated 1st on March 28, 2016	
Mischa Barton	Film & television actress	Artem Chigvintsev	Eliminated 2nd on April 4, 2016	
Marla Maples	Actress & television personality	Tony Dovolani	Eliminated 3rd on April 11, 2016	
Doug Flutie	NFL quarterback	Karina Smirnoff; Peta Murgatroyd (Week 5)	Eliminated 4th on April 25, 2016	
Kim Fields	Actress & reality television personality	Sasha Farber; Keo Motsepe (Week 5)	Eliminated 5th & 6th on May 2, 2016	
Von Miller	NFL linebacker	Witney Carson; Lindsay Arnold (Week 5)	Eliminated 5th & 6th on May 2, 2016	
Jodie Sweetin	Full House actress	Keo Motsepe; Valentin Chmerkovskiy (Week 5)	Eliminated 7th on May 9, 2016	
Antonio Brown	NFL wide receiver	Sharna Burgess; Karina Smirnoff (Week 5)	Eliminated 8th & 9th on May 16, 2016	
Wanyá Morris	Boyz II Men singer	Lindsay Arnold; Witney Carson (Week 5)	Eliminated 8th & 9th on May 16, 2016	
Ginger Zee	Good Morning America meteorologist	Valentin Chmerkovskiy; Mark Ballas (Week 5)	Third place on May 24, 2016	
Paige VanZant	UFC fighter & model	Mark Ballas; Alan Bersten (Week 2); Sasha Farber (Week 5)	Runners-up on May 24, 2016	
Nyle DiMarco	Model & actor	Peta Murgatroyd; Sharna Burgess (Week 5)	Winners on May 24, 2016	

=== Hosts and judges ===
Tom Bergeron and Erin Andrews returned as hosts, while judges Carrie Ann Inaba and Bruno Tonioli returned this season. Head judge Len Goodman returned after missing last season, while Julianne Hough, who served as a judge during the previous three seasons, did not. Season 16 runner-up Zendaya returned as a guest judge on April 11, and Maksim Chmerkovskiy returned as a guest judge on April 18.

=== Dance troupe ===
The dance troupe consisted of Jenna Johnson, Hayley Erbert, and Alan Bersten, who were joined by new members Dennis Jauch, Kiril Kulish, and Shannon Holtzapffel.

== Episodes ==
No. overall	No. in season	Title	Rating (18–49)	Original release date	U.S. viewers (millions)
374	1	"First Dances"	1.82	March 21, 2016	12.46
375	2	"Latin Night"	1.71	March 28, 2016	11.97
376	3	"Most Memorable Year Night"	1.75	April 4, 2016	11.97
377	4	"Disney Night"	1.99	April 11, 2016	12.51
378	5	"America's Switch-up"	1.58	April 18, 2016	10.95
379	6	"Famous Dances Night"	1.80	April 25, 2016	11.75
380	7	"Icons Night"	1.79	May 2, 2016	11.81
381	8	"Team-Up Challenge"	1.73	May 9, 2016	11.33
382	9	"Semifinals"	1.73	May 16, 2016	11.64
383	10	"Finals: Night 1"	1.92	May 23, 2016	12.34
384	11	"Finals: Night 2"	1.58	May 24, 2016	10.49

== Scoring chart ==
The highest score each week is indicated in bold green with a dagger (†), while the lowest score each week is indicated in italicized red with a double-dagger (‡).

Color key:

Winners
Runners-up
Third place
Bottom three
Eliminated

Dancing with the Stars (season 22) - Weekly scores
Couple	Pl.	Week												
Couple	Pl.	1	2	1+2	3	4 (Note: The couples were scored on a 40-point scale due to the presence of a guest judge.)	5	6	5+6	7	8	9	10	
Couple	Pl.	1	2	1+2	3	4	5	6	5+6	7	8	9	Night 1	Night 2
Nyle & Peta	1st	**23**†	20	43	**25**†	34	**37**†	25	**62**†	28+28=**56**†	29+29=58	27+30=57	27+30=57‡	+30=87 (Note: This couple finished in first place.)
Paige & Mark	2nd	21	**24**†	45	23	**36**†	31	28	59	30+25=55	28+29=57	30+29=59	29+30=**59**†	+30=**89**† (Note: This couple finished in second place.)
Ginger & Val	3rd	**23**†	21	44	21	**36**†	32	24	56	30+25=55	30+29=**59**†	27+29=56	28+30=58	+27=85‡ (Note: This couple finished in third place.)
Antonio & Sharna	4th	21	19	40	20	35	26‡	27	53	24+28=52	27+29=56	27+28=55‡ (Note: This couple was eliminated.)		
Wanyá & Lindsay	4th	**23**†	**24**†	**47**†	24	35	30	**29**†	59	27+28=55	25+29=54‡	30+30=**60**†		
Jodie & Keo	6th	20	21	41	23	27	35	25	60	26+25=51‡	30+29=**59**†			
Kim & Sasha	7th	20	19	39	22	32	28	24	52	27+25=52				
Von & Witney	7th	21	20	41	20	32	29	24	53	24+28=52				
Doug & Karina	9th	15	20	35 (Note: This couple was in the bottom three, but was not eliminated.)	20	24‡	28	21‡	49‡					
Marla & Tony	10th	21	20	41	21	28								
Mischa & Artem	11th	16	15	31	18‡									
Geraldo & Edyta	12th	13‡	13‡	26‡										

== Weekly scores ==
Individual judges' scores in the charts below (given in parentheses) are listed in this order from left to right: Carrie Ann Inaba, Len Goodman, Bruno Tonioli.

=== Week 1: First Dances ===
Couples are listed in the order they performed.

Couple	Scores	Dance	Music
Kim & Sasha	20 (7, 6, 7)	Cha-cha-cha	"Sax" — Fleur East
Paige & Mark	21 (7, 7, 7)	Foxtrot	"Ain't Got Far to Go" — Jess Glynne
Doug & Karina	15 (5, 5, 5)	Foxtrot	"Sweet Caroline" — Neil Diamond
Jodie & Keo	20 (7, 6, 7)	Tango	"Confident" — Demi Lovato
Geraldo & Edyta	13 (5, 4, 4)	Cha-cha-cha	"Treasure" — Bruno Mars
Marla & Tony	21 (7, 7, 7)	Quickstep	"Sparkling Diamonds" — Nicole Kidman
Wanyá & Lindsay	23 (8, 7, 8)	Cha-cha-cha	"Motownphilly" — Boyz II Men
Ginger & Val	23 (8, 7, 8)	Jive	"Move (You're Steppin' on My Heart)" — Henry Krieger
Mischa & Artem	16 (5, 5, 6)	Tango	"In the Night" — The Weeknd
Nyle & Peta	23 (8, 7, 8)	Cha-cha-cha	"Cake by the Ocean" — DNCE
Antonio & Sharna	21 (8, 6, 7)	Quickstep	"Bad Man" — Pitbull, feat. Robin Thicke, Joe Perry & Travis Barker
Von & Witney	21 (8, 6, 7)	Foxtrot	"My House" — Flo Rida

=== Week 2: Latin Night ===
The couples danced a Latin-inspired routine, and are listed in the order they performed.

Mark Ballas was unable to perform due to an injury, so Paige VanZant performed with Alan Bersten instead.

Couple	Scores	Dance	Music	Result
Jodie & Keo	21 (7, 7, 7)	Samba	"Bun Up the Dance" — Dillon Francis & Skrillex	Safe
Marla & Tony	20 (7, 6, 7)	Argentine tango	"Don't" — Ed Sheeran	Safe
Geraldo & Edyta	13 (5, 4, 4)	Salsa	"Ran Kan Kan" — Tito Puente	Eliminated
Paige & Alan	24 (8, 8, 8)	Salsa	"Danza Kuduro" — Don Omar, feat. Lucenzo	Safe
Antonio & Sharna	19 (6, 6, 7)	Rumba	"Adorn" — Miguel	Safe
Kim & Sasha	19 (7, 6, 6)	Salsa	"Conga" — Miami Sound Machine	Safe
Nyle & Peta	20 (7, 6, 7)	Rumba	"Stole the Show" — Kygo, feat. Parson James	Safe
Mischa & Artem	15 (5, 5, 5)	Cha-cha-cha	"Pata Pata" — Miriam Makeba	Bottom three
Von & Witney	20 (7, 6, 7)	Cha-cha-cha	"Ain't Too Cool" — LunchMoney Lewis	Safe
Wanyá & Lindsay	24 (8, 8, 8)	Salsa	"Echa Pa'lla (Manos Pa'rriba)" — Pitbull	Safe
Doug & Karina	20 (7, 6, 7)	Paso doble	"Buster Voodoo" — Rodrigo y Gabriela	Bottom three
Ginger & Val	21 (7, 7, 7)	Samba	"Sorry (Latino remix)" — Justin Bieber, feat. J. Balvin	Safe

=== Week 3: Most Memorable Year Night ===
The couples performed one unlearned dance to celebrate the most memorable year of their lives. Couples are listed in the order they performed.

Couple	Scores	Dance	Music	Result
Ginger & Val	21 (7, 7, 7)	Contemporary	"Home" — Phillip Phillips	Safe
Doug & Karina	20 (7, 6, 7)	Waltz	"Rainbow Connection" — Kermit the Frog	Safe
Kim & Sasha	22 (8, 7, 7)	Foxtrot	"Theme from The Facts of Life" — Al Burton, Gloria Loring & Alan Thicke	Safe
Von & Witney	20 (7, 6, 7)	Contemporary	"In the Air Tonight" — Phil Collins	Safe
Marla & Tony	21 (7, 7, 7)	Jive	"Happy" — Pharrell Williams	Safe
Antonio & Sharna	20 (7, 6, 7)	Foxtrot	"7 Years" — Lukas Graham	Safe
Paige & Mark	23 (8, 7, 8)	Paso doble	"300 Violin Orchestra" — Jorge Quintero	Safe
Jodie & Keo	23 (8, 7, 8)	Foxtrot	"Rise Up" — Andra Day	Safe
Mischa & Artem	18 (6, 6, 6)	Samba	"Party in the U.S.A." — Miley Cyrus	Eliminated
Wanyá & Lindsay	24 (8, 8, 8)	Waltz	"The Star-Spangled Banner" — Boyz II Men	Safe
Nyle & Peta	25 (8, 8, 9)	Tango	"Verge" — Owl City, feat. Aloe Blacc	Safe

=== Week 4: Disney Night ===
Individual judges scores in the chart below (given in parentheses) are listed in this order from left to right: Carrie Ann Inaba, Len Goodman, Zendaya, Bruno Tonioli.

The couples performed one unlearned dance to a song from a Disney film, and are listed in the order they performed.

Couple	Scores	Dance	Music	Disney film	Result
Antonio & Sharna	35 (9, 8, 9, 9)	Jazz	"Friend Like Me" — Ne-Yo	Aladdin	Safe
Marla & Tony	28 (7, 7, 7, 7)	Waltz	"Part of Your World" — Jodi Benson	The Little Mermaid	Eliminated
Nyle & Peta	34 (8, 8, 9, 9)	Samba	"Trashin' the Camp" — Phil Collins	Tarzan	Safe
Doug & Karina	24 (6, 6, 6, 6)	Jazz	"A Spoonful of Sugar" — Julie Andrews	Mary Poppins	Safe
Kim & Sasha	32 (8, 8, 8, 8)	Quickstep	"I Wan'na Be Like You (The Monkey Song)" — Fall Out Boy	The Jungle Book	Safe
Jodie & Keo	27 (7, 6, 7, 7)	Cha-cha-cha	"Try Everything" — Shakira	Zootopia	Safe
Von & Witney	32 (8, 8, 8, 8)	Viennese waltz	"A Dream Is a Wish Your Heart Makes" — Lily James	Cinderella	Safe
Ginger & Val	36 (9, 9, 9, 9)	Foxtrot	"Belle" — Paige O'Hara	Beauty and the Beast	Safe
Wanyá & Lindsay	35 (8, 9, 9, 9)	Samba	"Circle of Life (District 78 remix)" — District 78	The Lion King	Safe
Paige & Mark	36 (9, 9, 9, 9)	Quickstep	"You've Got a Friend in Me" — Randy Newman	Toy Story	Safe

=== Week 5: Switch-Up Night ===
Individual judges scores in the chart below (given in parentheses) are listed in this order from left to right: Carrie Ann Inaba, Len Goodman, Maksim Chmerkovskiy, Bruno Tonioli.

The celebrities performed one unlearned dance with a different partner selected by the general public. Couples are listed in the order they performed. Due to the nature of the week, no elimination took place this week.

Couple	Scores	Dance	Music
Wanyá & Witney	30 (8, 7, 7, 8)	Tango	"Hold Back the River" — James Bay
Kim & Keo	28 (8, 6, 6, 8)	Viennese waltz	"These Arms of Mine" — Otis Redding
Doug & Peta	28 (7, 7, 7, 7)	Tango	"Black and Gold" — Sam Sparro
Ginger & Mark	32 (8, 8, 8, 8)	Salsa	"La Malanga" — Eddie Palmieri
Antonio & Karina	26 (7, 6, 6, 7)	Cha-cha-cha	"Son of a Preacher Man" — Dusty Springfield
Paige & Sasha	31 (8, 8, 7, 8)	Rumba	"Perfect" — One Direction
Von & Lindsay	29 (8, 7, 7, 7)	Jive	"Hips" — Beans & Fatback
Nyle & Sharna	37 (9, 10, 9, 9) (Note: Official scores are submitted to producers before critiques are given. Though Maksim Chmerkovskiy and Bruno Tonioli announced scores of 10, they submitted 9s.)	Viennese waltz	"I Get to Love You" — Ruelle
Jodie & Val	35 (9, 8, 9, 9)	Paso doble	"Under Control" — Calvin Harris & Alesso, feat. Hurts

=== Week 6: Famous Dances Night ===
The couples performed one unlearned dance that paid tribute to iconic dance performances from films, music videos, or live performances. Couples are listed in the order they performed.

Couple	Scores	Dance	Music	Result
Kim & Sasha	24 (8, 8, 8)	Jive	"You Can't Stop the Beat" — from Hairspray	Safe
Von & Witney	24 (8, 8, 8)	Jazz	"Bad" — Michael Jackson	Safe
Jodie & Keo	25 (9, 8, 8)	Contemporary	"Try" — Pink	Safe
Paige & Mark	28 (9, 10, 9)	Jazz	"Soul Bossa Nova" — Quincy Jones	Safe
Nyle & Peta	25 (8, 8, 9)	Quickstep	"Hey! Pachuco!" — Royal Crown Revue	Safe
Ginger & Val	24 (8, 8, 8)	Jazz	"Nasty" — Janet Jackson	Safe
Doug & Karina	21 (7, 7, 7)	Bollywood	"Jai Ho" — A. R. Rahman	Eliminated
Wanyá & Lindsay	29 (10, 9, 10)	Jazz	"Bye Bye Bye" — NSYNC	Safe
Antonio & Sharna	27 (9, 9, 9)	Jive	"Footloose" — Kenny Loggins	Safe

=== Week 7: Icons Night ===
The couples performed one unlearned dance and a team dance to songs from popular musical icons. Two couples were eliminated at the end of the night. Couples are listed in the order they performed.

Couple	Scores	Dance	Music	Result
Jodie & Keo	26 (8, 9, 9)	Quickstep	"For Once in My Life" — Stevie Wonder	Safe
Kim & Sasha	27 (9, 9, 9)	Samba	"ABC" — The Jackson 5	Eliminated
Nyle & Peta	28 (10, 9, 9) (Note: The official scores are the ones submitted to the producers before critiques are given. Bruno Tonioli submitted a 9, so even though he held up his 10 paddle, the former score was the one that counted.)	Foxtrot	"Beautiful Day" — U2	Safe
Antonio & Sharna	24 (8, 8, 8)	Tango	"Paint It Black" — The Rolling Stones	Safe
Wanyá & Lindsay	27 (9, 9, 9)	Foxtrot	"I Say a Little Prayer" — Aretha Franklin	Safe
Ginger & Val	30 (10, 10, 10)	Viennese waltz	"I Have Nothing" — Whitney Houston	Safe
Von & Witney	24 (8, 8, 8)	Salsa	"A Little Less Conversation" — Elvis Presley	Eliminated
Paige & Mark	30 (10, 10, 10)	Jive	"Proud Mary" — Tina Turner	Safe
Antonio & Sharna Nyle & Peta Von & Witney Wanyá & Lindsay	28 (9, 9, 10)	Freestyle (Team James Brown)	"Super Bad", "Living in America" & "I Got You (I Feel Good)"; All by James Brown	
Ginger & Val Jodie & Keo Kim & Sasha Paige & Mark	25 (8, 8, 9)	Freestyle (Team Beyoncé)	"End of Time", "If I Were a Boy" & "Crazy in Love"; All by Beyoncé	

=== Week 8: Judges' Team-up Challenge ===
The couples performed one unlearned dance and a team-up dance with another couple that was designed and coached by one of the three judges. To avoid favoritism, the judges did not score their own teams, shown by the letter X below. Instead, the general public was able to score the team-up dances on a scale from 1 to 10, with an averaged score counting alongside the remaining judges. The score from the public vote is listed fourth on the scores for the team-up dances. Couples are listed in the order they performed.

Couple	Judge	Scores	Dance	Music	Result
Nyle & Peta		29 (10, 9, 10)	Paso doble	"Victorious" — Panic! at the Disco	Safe
Antonio & Sharna		27 (9, 9, 9)	Viennese waltz	"Love on the Brain" — Rihanna	Safe
Jodie & Keo		30 (10, 10, 10)	Jive	"Something's Got a Hold on Me" — Etta James	Eliminated
Paige & Mark		28 (10, 9, 9)	Viennese waltz	"Stone Cold" — Demi Lovato	Safe
Ginger & Val		30 (10, 10, 10)	Argentine tango	"Telephone" — Martynas Levickis	Safe
Wanyá & Lindsay		25 (8, 8, 9)	Jive	"Can You Do This" — Aloe Blacc	Safe
Jodie & Keo Nyle & Peta	Bruno Tonioli	29 (10, 10, X, 9)	Argentine tango	"Habanera" — Georges Bizet	
Ginger & Val Wanyá & Lindsay	Len Goodman	29 (10, X, 10, 9)	Samba	"Jump in the Line (Shake, Senora)" — Harry Belafonte	
Antonio & Sharna Paige & Mark	Carrie Ann Inaba	29 (X, 10, 10, 9)	Paso doble	"Everybody Wants to Rule the World" — Lorde	

=== Week 9: Semifinals ===
The couples performed one unlearned dance and a trio dance involving an eliminated pro or a member of the troupe. There were two eliminations at the end of the night. Couples are listed in the order they performed.

Couple	Trio partner	Scores	Dance	Music	Result
Paige & Mark	Alan Bersten	30 (10, 10, 10)	Samba	"Hip Hip Chin Chin" — Club des Belugas	Safe
Paige & Mark	Alan Bersten	29 (10, 9, 10)	Argentine tango	"One Time" — Marian Hill	Safe
Antonio & Sharna	Hayley Erbert	27 (9, 9, 9)	Argentine tango	"Mi Confesión" — Gotan Project	Eliminated
Antonio & Sharna	Hayley Erbert	28 (9, 9, 10)	Contemporary	"Hall of Fame" — The Script, feat. will.i.am	Eliminated
Wanyá & Lindsay	Witney Carson	30 (10, 10, 10)	Paso doble	"Explosive" — David Garrett & Royal Philharmonic Orchestra	Eliminated
Wanyá & Lindsay	Witney Carson	30 (10, 10, 10)	Charleston	"Shame on Me" — Avicii, feat. Sterling Fox & Audra Mae	Eliminated
Nyle & Peta	Jenna Johnson	27 (9, 9, 9)	Jive	"Hit the Road Jack" — Hermes House Band	Safe
Nyle & Peta	Jenna Johnson	30 (10, 10, 10)	Argentine tango	"Unsteady" — X Ambassadors	Safe
Ginger & Val	Artem Chigvintsev	27 (9, 9, 9)	Paso doble	"Shot Me Down" — David Guetta, feat. Skylar Grey	Safe
Ginger & Val	Artem Chigvintsev	29 (9, 10, 10)	Quickstep	"Fire Under My Feet" — Leona Lewis	Safe

=== Week 10: Finals ===
On the first night, the couples performed a redemption dance and their freestyle routine. On the second night, the couples danced a fusion dance of two previously learned dance styles. Couples are listed in the order they performed.

Night 1

Couple	Scores	Dance	Music
Ginger & Val	28 (9, 10, 9)	Contemporary	"Adventure of a Lifetime" — Coldplay
Ginger & Val	30 (10, 10, 10)	Freestyle	"Orange Colored Sky" — Nat King Cole
Nyle & Peta	27 (9, 9, 9)	Quickstep	"S.O.B." — Nathaniel Rateliff & the Night Sweats
Nyle & Peta	30 (10, 10, 10)	Freestyle	"The Sound of Silence" — Disturbed
Paige & Mark	29 (10, 9, 10)	Salsa	"Fireball" — Pitbull, feat. John Ryan
Paige & Mark	30 (10, 10, 10)	Freestyle	"Over the Rainbow" — BC Jean

Night 2

Couple	Scores	Dance	Music	Result
Ginger & Val	27 (9, 9, 9)	Argentine tango & Foxtrot	"Just Like Fire" — Pink	Third place
Nyle & Peta	30 (10, 10, 10)	Cha-cha-cha & Tango	"Summer" — Calvin Harris	Winners
Paige & Mark	30 (10, 10, 10)	Jive & Salsa	"Little Bitty Pretty One" — Thurston Harris and the Sharps	Runners-up

== Dance chart ==
The couples performed the following each week:

- Week 1: One unlearned dance
- Week 2: One unlearned Latin dance
- Weeks 3–6: One unlearned dance
- Week 7: One unlearned dance & team dance
- Week 8: One unlearned dance & team-up challenge
- Week 9 (Semifinals): One unlearned dance & trio dance
- Week 10 (Finals, Night 1): Redemption dance & freestyle
- Week 10 (Finals, Night 2): Fusion dance

Color key:

No scores received

Dancing with the Stars (season 22) - Dance chart
Couple	Week														
Couple	1	2	3	4	5	6	7		8		9		10		
Couple	1	2	3	4	5	6	7		8		9		Night 1		Night 2
Nyle & Peta	Cha-cha-cha	Rumba	Tango	Samba	Viennese waltz	Quickstep	Foxtrot	Team Freestyle	Paso doble	Argentine tango	Jive	Argentine tango	Quickstep	Freestyle	Cha-cha-cha & Tango
Paige & Mark	Foxtrot	Salsa	Paso doble	Quickstep	Rumba	Jazz	Jive	Team Freestyle	Viennese waltz	Paso doble	Samba	Argentine tango	Salsa	Freestyle	Jive & Salsa
Ginger & Val	Jive	Samba	Contemp.	Foxtrot	Salsa	Jazz	Viennese waltz	Team Freestyle	Argentine tango	Samba	Paso doble	Quickstep	Contemp.	Freestyle	Argentine tango & Foxtrot
Antonio & Sharna	Quickstep	Rumba	Foxtrot	Jazz	Cha-cha-cha	Jive	Tango	Team Freestyle	Viennese waltz	Paso doble	Argentine tango	Contemp.			Jazz (Note: No scores were received for this dance.)
Wanyá & Lindsay	Cha-cha-cha	Salsa	Waltz	Samba	Tango	Jazz	Foxtrot	Team Freestyle	Jive	Samba	Paso doble	Charleston			Charleston
Jodie & Keo	Tango	Samba	Foxtrot	Cha-cha-cha	Paso doble	Contemp.	Quickstep	Team Freestyle	Jive	Argentine tango					Jive
Kim & Sasha	Cha-cha-cha	Salsa	Foxtrot	Quickstep	Viennese waltz	Jive	Samba	Team Freestyle							Cha-cha-cha
Von & Witney	Foxtrot	Cha-cha-cha	Contemp.	Viennese waltz	Jive	Jazz	Salsa	Team Freestyle							
Doug & Karina	Foxtrot	Paso doble	Waltz	Jazz	Tango	Bollywood									
Marla & Tony	Quickstep	Argentine tango	Jive	Waltz											
Mischa & Artem	Tango	Cha-cha-cha	Samba												
Geraldo & Edyta	Cha-cha-cha	Salsa													
