= Rashad Jennings =

American football player (born 1985)

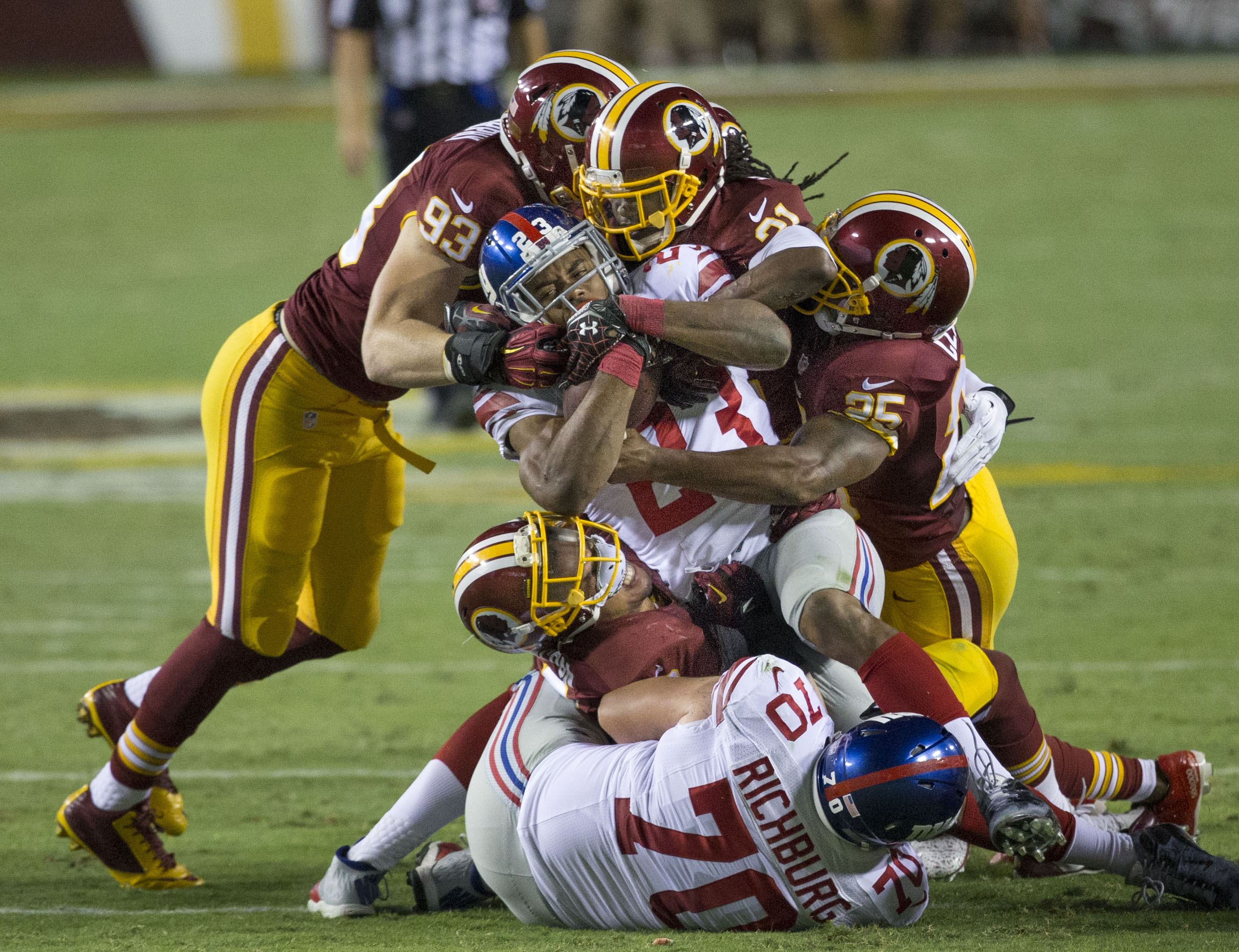
- Jennings (center) with the New York Giants in 2014

No. 23, 27
- Position: Running back

Personal information
- Born: March 26, 1985 (age 41); Forest, Virginia, U.S.
- Listed height: 6 ft 1 in (1.85 m)
- Listed weight: 231 lb (105 kg)

Career information
- High school: Liberty Christian Academy (Lynchburg, Virginia)
- College: Pittsburgh (2005); Liberty (2006–2008)
- NFL draft: 2009: 7th round, 250th overall pick

Career history
- Jacksonville Jaguars (2009–2012); Oakland Raiders (2013); New York Giants (2014–2016); FCF Kingpens (2022)

Awards and highlights
- Consensus I-AA All-American (2008); 2× Big South Offensive Player of the Year (2007, 2008); 2× First-team All-Big South (2007, 2008); Liberty Flames No. 23 retired

Career NFL statistics
- Rushing yards: 3,772
- Rushing average: 4.1
- Rushing touchdowns: 23
- Receptions: 191
- Receiving yards: 1,469
- Receiving touchdowns: 2
- Stats at Pro Football Reference

Rashad Andre Jennings (born March 26, 1985) is an American former professional football player who was a running back in the National Football League (NFL). He played college football for the Pittsburgh Panthers and the Liberty Flames and was selected by the Jacksonville Jaguars in the seventh round of the 2009 NFL draft. Jennings also played for the Oakland Raiders and the New York Giants.

== Early life ==
Jennings began his high school career at Jefferson Forest High School in his hometown, Forest, Virginia. As a fifth string running back, he didn't play in a game until the last game of his junior year. As a self-described "270 lb. chubby kid with asthma and glasses", Jennings finally played after the first four running backs ahead of him on the depth chart went down with injuries and after his coach attempted to play a wide receiver at running back. On his first handoff he ran the ball in for a 30-yard touchdown. After a 40-yard rushing touchdown and scoring 2 more touchdowns on defense, Jennings was approached by a scout from the University of Tennessee who had come to see the starting running back. After inquiring about his grades and discovering Jennings had a 0.6 GPA, the scout said "Son, you have potential... Get your grades right!"

After the encouragement, Rashad transferred to Lynchburg Christian Academy. His older brothers began coaching at the school the year before. Once enrolled both brothers used their coaching stipends to help pay the tuition since Rashad could not afford it. At LCA, he would begin to shed some weight and take to learning after having to repeat his junior year. In his junior and senior year, he was a two-time All-VISAA Division II selection while totaling 3,287 yards and 56 touchdowns, including 1,978 rushing yards and 33 touchdowns as a senior, while also lettering twice in basketball.

== College career ==
Jennings began his college career at Pittsburgh in 2005, only the fourth true freshman running back to start there. However, Jennings transferred to the then Division I-FCS Liberty, in spring 2006, to be closer to his family. Though Jennings was suspended for the first two games of the 2007 season due to an internal violation, he set a Big South Conference record with 3,633 yards, 42 touchdowns, and averaged 5.7 yards per carry.

On October 9, 2021, the Liberty Flames retired his number 23.

== Professional career ==
Pre-draft measurables
Height	Weight	Arm length	Hand span	40-yard dash	10-yard split	20-yard split	20-yard shuttle	Three-cone drill	Vertical jump	Broad jump	Bench press
6 ft 1 in (1.85 m)	231 lb (105 kg)	32 in (0.81 m)	10 3/8 in (0.26 m)	4.52 s	1.53 s	2.62 s	4.20 s	6.79 s	34 in (0.86 m)	10 ft 0 in (3.05 m)	29 reps
All values from NFL Combine/Pro Day

=== Jacksonville Jaguars ===
After being coached by the Jacksonville Jaguars' staff during the 2009 Senior Bowl, Jennings was selected by Jacksonville in the seventh round (250th overall) of the 2009 NFL draft. He scored his first career touchdown in Week 9 against the Kansas City Chiefs, rushing for 29 yards. Jennings finished his rookie season with 39 carries for 202 yards and one touchdown.

In Week 14 of the 2010 season, Jennings had five carries for 109 yards and a touchdown in a victory over the Raiders. In Week 17, he had 22 carries for 108 yards and a touchdown in the loss to the Texans. In the 2010 season, he appeared in 13 games and made three starts. He finished with 84 carries for 459 yards and four touchdowns to go with 26 receptions for 223 yards.

Jennings's 2011 season was cut short by injuries after suffering a concussion in the Jaguars' first preseason game, and his knee injury two weeks later, Jennings was placed in injured reserve before the regular season began.

Due to a contract holdout by starter Maurice Jones-Drew, Jennings was named the starting running back for the team's 2012 regular season opener against the Minnesota Vikings. Jones-Drew returned to the starting lineup the following week Jennings resumed his role as a backup until a shoulder injury on December 24, 2012, landed him on injured reserve for the second consecutive year. He finished the season with 101 carries for 283 yards and two touchdowns in ten games and six starts.

=== Oakland Raiders ===
Jennings was signed by the Oakland Raiders on April 11, 2013. Jennings started the 2013 season backing up starter Darren McFadden. McFadden spent much of the season on the sideline due to injuries, forcing Jennings to start eight games in his place. Jennings, a career backup, exceeded expectations as a starter and saw his best rushing game of the season in Week 11 against the Houston Texans where he rushed 22 times for 150 yards (6.8 ypc) and one touchdown on an 80-yard rush. In Week 15 against the Chiefs, he had 103 scrimmage yards and two rushing touchdowns in the loss. Jennings finished the 2013 season with 733 rushing yards on 163 carries and six touchdowns.

=== New York Giants ===
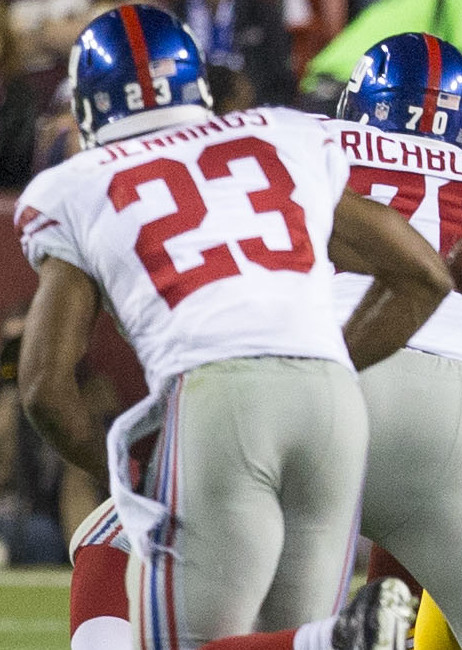
Jennings in 2014

On March 12, 2014, Jennings signed a four-year, $14 million contract including $3 million guaranteed with the New York Giants. Jennings quickly took over as starter, starting nine games out of the 11 that he played. In Week 3 against the Texans, he had 34 carries for 176 yards in the win. Jennings rushed for 639 yards on 167 carries and scored four rushing touchdowns.

Jennings started all 16 games in 2015, and set career highs in carries, rushing yards, receiving yards, and receiving touchdowns. Jennings recorded 863 yards along with three touchdowns on 195 carries, as well as 296 yards and one receiving touchdown on 29 receptions. Jennings played his best football later in the season, besting his previous season highs in both carries and yards in each of his final four games, with 79 carries for 432 yards and 2 touchdowns in that stretch.

Jennings played in 13 games in 2016, rushing for 593 yards, his lowest total since 2013, and scored three touchdowns on 181 carries. He added 35 receptions for 201 receiving yards and one receiving touchdown in 2016.

On February 13, 2017, Jennings was released by the Giants.

On December 8, 2017, Jennings announced his retirement from the NFL.

=== Fan Controlled Football ===
In early 2022, Jennings was a coach for the Fan Controlled Football Kingpens. On May 21, 2022, Jennings played running back with the Fan Controlled Football Kingpens.

== NFL career statistics ==
Year	Team	Games		Rushing					Receiving					Fumbles	
Year	Team	GP	GS	Att	Yds	Avg	Lng	TD	Rec	Yds	Avg	Lng	TD	Fum	Lost
2009	JAX	15	0	39	202	5.2	28	1	16	101	6.3	14	0	0	0
2010	JAX	13	3	84	459	5.5	74	4	26	223	8.6	25	0	0	0
2011	JAX	0	0	Did not play due to injury											
2012	JAX	10	6	101	283	2.8	21	2	19	130	6.8	26	0	3	1
2013	OAK	15	8	163	733	4.5	80	6	36	292	8.1	24	0	0	0
2014	NYG	11	9	167	639	3.8	18	4	30	226	7.5	27	0	1	1
2015	NYG	16	16	195	863	4.4	38	3	29	296	10.2	51	1	3	2
2016	NYG	13	12	181	593	3.3	25	3	35	201	5.7	24	1	1	0
Total		93	54	930	3,772	4.1	80	23	191	1,469	7.7	51	2	8	4

== Dancing with the Stars and Acting ==
On March 1, 2017, Jennings was revealed as one of the contestants who would compete on Season 24 of Dancing with the Stars and was paired with professional dancer Emma Slater. Jennings and Slater went on to win the competition on May 23, 2017. It was Slater's first win on the competition show and Jennings is the fourth NFL player to win the show.

In November 2017, Jennings returned to 25th season in Week eight, to participate in a trio Cha-cha-cha with Drew Scott and his professional partner Emma Slater.

In May 2018, Jennings returned to the ballroom as guest judge for Week 2 of season 26.

Jennings later returned in season 27 as a trio partner once again to DeMarcus Ware and Lindsay Arnold.

To celebrate the twentieth anniversary of the show, Jennings returned to the ballroom again in Dancing with the Stars (American TV series) season 34 as a relay dance partner to Elaine Hendrix (normally paired with Alan Bersten). Former mirrorball champions were paired with contestants to compete in the relay dance portion of the competition.

Week #	Dance/Song	Judges' score				Result
Week #	Dance/Song	Inaba	Goodman	Hough	Tonioli	Result
1	Cha-cha-cha / "24K Magic"	8	7	8	8	No Elimination
2	Viennese Waltz / "Suffer"	8	8	8	8	Safe
3	Samba / "Swalla"	7	7	7	7	Safe
4	Contemporary / "Unconditionally"	10	9	10	10	Safe
5	Foxtrot / "Evermore"	7	8	9	8	Safe
6	Tango / "Reach Out I'll Be There"; Team Freestyle / "Dancing Machine", "You Got It (The Right Stuff)" & "Best Song Ever"	9; 8	9; 8	10^{1} 9^{1}	9; 8	Safe
7	Paso Doble / "O Fortuna"; Jive Dance-Off / "Gimme Some Lovin'"	9 Awarded	9; 2	10^{2} Extra	9 Points	Safe
8	Jive / "Shake a Tail Feather"; Trio Argentine Tango / "Dreams"	9; 10	9; 9	9; 10	9; 10	Last to be called safe
9 Semifinals	Rumba / "Say You Won't Let Go"; Quickstep / "Yes I Can"	9; 10	9; 9	10; 10	10; 10	Safe
10; Finals	Viennese Waltz / "Dark Times"; Freestyle / "Let's Go" & "Uptown Funk"; Cha-cha-cha & Tango Fusion / "I Don't Like It, I Love It"	10; 10; 10	10; 10; 9	10; 10; 10	10; 10; 10	Winner

^{1} Score given by guest judge Nick Carter.
^{2} Score given by guest judge Mandy Moore.

In 2016, Jennings appeared in one episode of the STARZ series, Power, as a guest in the club Truth. Season 3; Episode 10 titled “In My Best Interest”.

In 2017, Jennings appeared as a contestant on Talk Show the Game Show with Guy Branum.

In 2017, Jennings also appeared in one episode of the NBC series Great News as Portia’s fiancé, Carvell.

In January 2019, Rashad appeared as the guest co-host with Nev Schulman in the MTV show Catfish.

In January 2020, Jennings appeared as a contestant on Guy's Grocery Games - Game Day Super Teams with Guy Fieri.

Awards and achievements
Preceded by Laurie Hernandez & Valentin Chmerkovskiy	Dancing with the Stars (US) champion Season 24 (Spring 2017 with Emma Slater)	Succeeded by Jordan Fisher & Lindsay Arnold
