= Ray Chew =

American musician

- Born: September 7, 1958 (age 67)
- Origin: Manhattan, New York City
- Occupations: Music Director and Pianist
- Years active: 1980–present

Ray Chew (born 7 September 1958) is an American musician who plays keyboards and is a contemporary and orchestral arranger. He has been the music director of ABC's Dancing with the Stars since 2014.

== Biography ==
Chew grew up in the Grant Houses in Morningside Heights, and moved to Teaneck, New Jersey, in 2000. He was given a scholarship to study in the children's program at the Juilliard School on the Upper West Side at six years old, and later studied at Harlem School of the Arts. He also studied at Third Street Music School Settlement in the early 1970s for four years.

Chew landed his first professional gig with Tony award winner Melba Moore. At 19, Nick Ashford and Valerie Simpson chose him as their music director. He is credited as arranger and or pianist in recordings for artists including Diana Ross, Luther Vandross, Roberta Flack, and Donny Hathaway.

Chew was a member of the Saturday Night Live Band from 1980 to 1983. During the 1990s and 2000s, he was music director for the syndicated television series Showtime at the Apollo and the bandleader on The Singing Bee. He was the bandleader during the 2008 Democratic National Convention, and the Barack Obama Neighborhood Ball on the night after the first inauguration of Barack Obama in 2009.

Chew was music director for Fox's American Idol from 2011 to 2013. In 2014, he musically directed the Macy's Thanksgiving Day Parade. He has also served as music director for the Miss Universe and Miss USA pageants since 2010.

== Bibliography ==
- "The One And Only Ray Chew". 6 June 2017.
