= Artem Chigvintsev =

American dancer (born 1982)

- Артём Чи́гвинцев
- Born: Artem Vladimirovich Chigvintsev; 12 June 1982 (age 44); Izhevsk, Udmurt ASSR, Russian SFSR, Soviet Union
- Citizenship: United States
- Occupations: Dancer; choreographer; reality television star
- Years active: 2003–present
- Television: So You Think You Can Dance; Strictly Come Dancing (2010–2013); Dancing with the Stars (2014–2018; 2020–2023)
- Height: 1.78 m (5 ft 10 in)
- Spouses: Giselle Peacock (m. 2004; div. 2005) Nikki Bella/Garcia (m. 2022; div. 2024)
- Partner: Kara Tointon (2010–2014)
- Children: 1

YouTube information
- Channel: Artem Chigvintsev
- Years active: 2014–2021
- Genre: Vlog
- Subscribers: 20.1 thousand
- Views: 7.7 million
- Last updated: July 8, 2025
- Website: artemchigvintsev.com

Artem Vladimirovich Chigvintsev (Russian: Артём Влади́мирович Чи́гвинцев; born 12 June 1982) is a Russian-born American professional dancer, specializing in Latin dancing.

Chigvintsev was a cast member of Burn the Floor where he performed both on Broadway and more recently in the West End in 2009. Chigvintsev joined Strictly Come Dancing in 2010 straight from Burn the Floor. He won the show in his first year with his celebrity partner Kara Tointon.

== Early life ==
Chigvintsev was born at Izhevsk, Udmurt Autonomous Soviet Socialist Republic, RSFSR, Soviet Union. He moved to the United States in 2003 and began dancing with champion ballroom dancer Giselle Peacock. Chigvintsev auditioned to appear as a contestant on the first series of So You Think You Can Dance. Chigvintsev was eliminated alongside his fellow contestant Melissa Vella, but returned as a guest choreographer for season two.

== Strictly Come Dancing ==
In September 2010, Chigvintsev joined Strictly Come Dancing series 8 as a professional dancer, where he was partnered with actress Kara Tointon. The pair achieved good scores in the first five weeks of 30, 31, 31, 32, and 37. In week 5, they were awarded the first 10 of the series by Alesha Dixon for their paso doble. In week 6 they were top of the leaderboard with their salsa. They also had good scores for the next five weeks of 37, 38, 35, 33, and 38. In week 11, they got their highest score of 39 for the Viennese Waltz and Rumba and got the maximum 5/5 for the swing-a-thon. Chigvintsev and Tointon made it to the final along with Matt Baker and Pamela Stephenson. The pair went on to win the competition, defeating Matt Baker and his partner Aliona Vilani, and being crowned series champions for 2010. Chigvintsev is one of five professionals to win the series as a first-time Strictly pro.

In 2011's Strictly Come Dancing season 9 Chigvintsev was partnered with Holly Valance. He and Valance made it to Week 11, the semi-finals, before being eliminated.

Chigvintsev's celebrity partner in the 10th series of Strictly Come Dancing was television presenter Fern Britton. They were eliminated in Week 6.

His celebrity partner in the eleventh series of Strictly Come Dancing was former Coronation Street star Natalie Gumede, who played Kirsty Soames. They reached the finals and became one of the runners-up, along with Susanna Reid and Kevin Clifton, losing to model Abbey Clancy.

Series	Celebrity partner	Place	Average Score
8	Kara Tointon	1st	35.7
9	Holly Valance	4th	32.8
10	Fern Britton	10th	23.0
11	Natalie Gumede	2nd	36.9

=== Highest and lowest performances per dance ===
Dance	Partner	Highest	Partner	Lowest
American Smooth	Natalie Gumede	40	Fern Britton	21
Argentine Tango	Kara Tointon; Natalie Gumede	38	Holly Valance	36
Cha-Cha-Cha	Natalie Gumede	39	Fern Britton	19
Charleston	Natalie Gumede	39	Fern Britton	23
Dance a thon	Natalie Gumede	6	Holly Valance	3
Foxtrot	Holly Valance	34	Kara Tointon	31
Jive	Holly Valance	34	Kara Tointon	33
Paso Doble	Holly Valance	38	Fern Britton	24
Quickstep	Natalie Gumede	35	Kara Tointon; Holly Valance	31
Rumba	Kara Tointon x2	39	Holly Valance*	34
Salsa	Natalie Gumede	40	Fern Britton	27
Samba	Natalie Gumede	35		
Freestyle	Natalie Gumede	40	Kara Tointon	36
Tango	Kara Tointon	38	Holly Valance	30
Viennese Waltz	Kara Tointon	39	Fern Britton	24
Waltz	Kara Tointon	38	Natalie Gumede	34

- Chigvintsev was injured, so Brendan Cole performed with Valance.

=== Series 8: with celebrity partner Kara Tointon ===
Week #	Dance/Song	Judges' score				Total	Result
Week #	Dance/Song	Horwood	Goodman	Dixon	Tonioli	Total	Result
1	Cha-Cha-Cha / "I Like It"	7	8	8	7	30	No elimination
2	Foxtrot / "From Russia with Love"	7	8	9	8	32	Safe
3	Quickstep / "Are You Gonna Be My Girl"	8	8	8	7	31	Safe
4	Charleston / "Put a Lid on It"	8	8	8	8	32	Safe
5	Paso Doble / "The Phantom of the Opera"	9	9	10	9	37	Safe
6	Salsa / "Conga"	9	9	9	9	36	Safe
7	Argentine Tango / "Los Vino"	9	9	10	10	38	Safe
8	American Smooth / "Cry Me a River"	9	6	10	10	35	Safe
9	Jive / "Runaround Sue"	7	9	9	9	34	Safe
10	Tango / "El Tango de Roxanne"	9	9	10	10	38	Safe
11	Viennese Waltz / "Stop!"; Swing-a-thon / "In the Mood"; Rumba / "Samba Pa Ti"	9 Awarded; 9	10; 5; 10	10 bonus 10	10 points 10	39; 44; 39	Safe
12	Rumba / "Samba Pa Ti"; Freestyle / "Don't Stop Me Now"; Waltz / "If You Don't Know Me By Now"; American Smooth / "Cry Me a River"	9; 9; 9; 10	10; 9; 9; 7	10; 9; 10; 10	10; 9; 10; 10	39; 36; 38; 37	WON

=== Series 9: with celebrity partner Holly Valance ===
Week #	Dance/Song	Judges' score				Total	Result
Week #	Dance/Song	Horwood	Goodman	Dixon	Tonioli	Total	Result
1	Cha-Cha-Cha/ "Who's That Chick?"	7	7	7	7	28	N/A
2	Salsa/ "Mas Que Nada"	7	7	8	8	30	Safe
3	Tango/ "Cell Block Tango"	7	8	7	8	30	Safe
4	Viennese Waltz/ "Cry Me Out"	7	7	8	8	30	Safe
5	American Smooth/ "Swan Lake"	8	9	9	9	35	Safe
6	Jive/ "Runaway Baby"	8	9^{1}	8	9	34	Safe
7^{2}	Rumba/ "Leave Right Now"	8	8	9	9	34	Safe
8	Quickstep/ "Valerie"	7	8	8	8	31	Bottom two
9	Foxtrot/ "Mamma Knows Best"	8	8	9	9	34	Bottom two
10	Paso Doble/ "The Plaza of Execution"	9	9	10	10	38	Safe
11 (Semi finals)	Argentine Tango/ "Por una Cabeza"; Charleston/ "We No Speak Americano"	9; 8	9; 8	9; 9	9; 9	36; 34	Eliminated
^{1} In week 6, American actress Jennifer Grey replaced Goodman on the judging panel in his absence therefore, Horwood acted as head judge.^{2} Artem injured his back whilst practicing the rumba, therefore he wasn't able to dance with Valance and was replaced by Darren Bennet for that week.

=== Series 10: with celebrity partner Fern Britton ===
Week #	Dance/Song	Judges' score				Total	Result
Week #	Dance/Song	Horwood	Bussell	Goodman	Tonioli	Total	Result
1	Cha-Cha-Cha/ "Signed, Sealed, Delivered I'm Yours"	4	5	5	5	19	N/A
2	Viennese Waltz/ "She's Always a Woman"	6	6	6	6	24	Safe
3	Charleston/ "Supercalifragilisticexpialidocious"	5	6	6	6	23	Safe
4	American Smooth/ "Killer Queen"	4	5	6	6	21	Safe
5	Paso Doble/ "España cañí"	6	6	6	6	24	Safe
6	Salsa/ "You'll Be Mine (Party Time)"	6	7	7	7	27	Eliminated

=== Series 11: with celebrity partner Natalie Gumede ===
Week #	Dance/Song	Judges' score				Total	Result
Week #	Dance/Song	Horwood	Bussell	Goodman	Tonioli	Total	Result
1	Cha-cha-cha / "Rasputin"	8	8	8	7	31	No elimination
2	Waltz / "If I Ain't Got You"	8	9	8	9	34	Safe
3	Rumba / "Love the Way You Lie (Part II)"	9	9	9	9	36	Safe
4	Quickstep / "Yeah!"	9	9	8	9	35	Safe
5	Samba / "Bamboléo"	8	9	9	9	35	Safe
6	Viennese waltz / "Devil in Me"	9	10	9	10	38	Safe
8	Charleston / "Bang Bang"	9	10	10	10	39	Safe
9	Tango / "Where Have You Been"	9	9	9	10	37	Safe
10	American Smooth / "And I'm Telling You I'm Not Going"	9	9	8	10	36	Safe
11	Paso doble / "El Gato Montes"; Swing-a-thon / "Do You Love Me"	9 Awarded	9; 6	8 bonus	9 points	35; 41	Safe
12	Salsa / "Wanna Be Startin' Somethin'"; Argentine tango / "Montserrat"	10; 9	10; 9	10; 10	10; 10	40; 38	Bottom two
13	Cha-cha-cha / "Rasputin"; Freestyle / "Steppin' Out with My Baby"; American Smooth / "And I'm Telling You I'm Not Going"	9; 10; 10	10; 10; 10	10; 10; 10	10; 10; 10	39; 40; 40	Runner-up

- In week 7, Natalie fainted, so was given a bye to the following week.

== Dancing with the Stars ==
In 2014, after competing on the 11th series of Strictly, Chigvintsev appeared in the 18th season of Dancing with the Stars as a member of the Dance Troupe. Later that year, it was announced that Chigvintsev had been promoted to professional dancer for the show's 19th season, marking his exit from Strictly Come Dancing.

He was paired for season 19 with actress Lea Thompson. The couple was eliminated in week 9 (the quarterfinals) and finished in sixth place.

He returned for season 20 and paired with award-winning singer Patti LaBelle. The couple was eliminated on week 6 and finished in eighth place.

On 19 August 2015, Chigvintsev was announced as one of the professional dancers for season 21 of Dancing with the Stars. However, when the full season 21 cast was revealed with their partners, Chigvintsev was not part of the lineup. Chigvintsev wrote on Instagram that he would not be competing on season 21 due to a last-minute casting change, but he would still dance with the pros in the ballroom. It was later revealed that former Bachelorette Kaitlyn Bristowe was meant to compete alongside him that season, but was prevented by Bachelor producer Mike Fleiss. Bristowe would partner with Artem five years later (2020) on season 29.

Chigvintsev returned for season 22 partnering with actress Mischa Barton. They were eliminated on Week 3 of competition and finished in 11th place.

For season 23, he was paired with Brady Bunch actress and author Maureen McCormick. McCormick and Chigvintsev were eliminated in week 7 finishing in 8th place.

For season 24, he was paired with former figure skater Nancy Kerrigan. On 1 May 2017, Kerrigan and Chigvintsev were eliminated in a double elimination along with The Bachelor star Nick Viall and Peta Murgatroyd.

For season 25, he was paired with WWE wrestler Nikki Bella. They were eliminated in week 7 of the competition in a double elimination only announced at the end of the show. This marked the third season in a row where Artem and his partner left in the seventh week of competition and the second in a row where he left as part of a double elimination.

For season 26, he was partnered with Olympic snowboarder Jamie Anderson. They were eliminated in the first week of competition, tying for ninth place with Johnny Damon and Emma Slater. This marked the third season in a row where Chigvintsev left as part of a double elimination.

For season 27, he was paired with Paralympic skier Danelle Umstead. The couple was eliminated in week 2 and finished in 12th place.

Chigvintsev did not appear in season 28, but returned for season 29 with Bristowe. They were announced as the winners of the competition on the season finale. This was Chigvinstev's first win in his nine seasons on the show and made him the only professional dancer to win both DWTS and the original (UK) version of Strictly Come Dancing.

For season 30, he was paired with actress Melora Hardin. They were eliminated in the semifinals and finished in 6th place.

For season 31, he was paired with social media personality Heidi D'Amelio. They were eliminated in the quarterfinals and finished in 8th place.

For season 32, he was paired with The Bachelorette star Charity Lawson. They made it to the final and finished in 4th place.

Season	Partner	Place	Average
19	Lea Thompson	6th	25.6
20	Patti LaBelle	8th	21.4
22	Mischa Barton	11th	16.3
23	Maureen McCormick	8th	22.2
24	Nancy Kerrigan	6th	24.4
25	Nikki Bella	7th	22.9
26	Jamie Anderson	9th	19.0
27	Danelle Umstead	12th	18.3
29	Kaitlyn Bristowe	1st	26.4
30	Melora Hardin	6th	25.6
31	Heidi D'Amelio	8th	24.6
32	Charity Lawson	4th	26.6

=== Season 19 with celebrity partner Lea Thompson ===
Week #	Dance/Song	Judges' score				Result
Week #	Dance/Song	Inaba	Goodman	J. Hough	Tonioli	Result
1	Foxtrot / "This Will Be (An Everlasting Love)"	8	8	8	8	Safe
2	Jive / "Land of a Thousand Dances"	9	8	9	9	Safe
3	Cha-Cha-Cha / "The Power of Love"	7	8^{1}	8	8	Safe
4	Contemporary / "Dance with My Father"	10	9^{2}	10	10	Safe
5^{3}	Broadway / "You Can't Stop the Beat"	9	8^{4}	8	9	No Elimination
6	Salsa / "Sexy People"	8	8^{5}	8	8	Safe
7	Argentine Tango / "Necessary Evil"; Team Freestyle / "Black Widow"	8; 9	8; 9	9; 9	9; 9	Safe
8	Jazz / "Somethin' Bad"; Jive Dance-Off / "Rip It Up"	8 No	8 Extra	8 Points	8 Awarded	Safe
9 Quarter-finals	Samba / "Animals"; Paso Doble (Trio Challenge) / "Black Betty"	8; 9	9; 9	8; 9	9; 9	Eliminated

^{1} Score given by guest judge Kevin Hart in place of Goodman.

^{2} The American public scored the dance in place of Goodman with the averaged score being counted alongside the three other judges.

^{3}This week only, for "Partner Switch-Up" week, Thompson performed with Valentin Chmerkovskiy instead of Chigvinstev. Chigvintsev performed with Janel Parrish.

^{4}Score given by guest judge Jessie J in place of Goodman.

^{5}Score given by guest judge Pitbull in place of Goodman.

=== Season 20 with celebrity partner Patti LaBelle ===
Week #	Dance/Song	Judges' score				Result
Week #	Dance/Song	Inaba	Goodman	J. Hough	Tonioli	Result
1	Foxtrot / "Lady Marmalade"	7	6	6	6	No Elimination
2	Salsa / "In da Club"	7	7	7	7	Safe
3	Cha-cha-cha / "Oye 2014"	6	5	5	6	Safe
4	Jazz / "Dan Swit Me"	8	7	7	8	Safe
5	Waltz / "When You Wish Upon A Star"	7	6	7	7	Safe
6	Quickstep / "Heat Wave"; Team Freestyle / "Trouble"	8; 10	7; 9	7; 10	7; 10	Eliminated

=== Season 22 with celebrity partner Mischa Barton ===
Week #	Dance/Song	Judges' score			Result
Week #	Dance/Song	Inaba	Goodman	Tonioli	Result
1	Tango / "In the Night"	5	5	6	No Elimination
2	Cha-cha-cha / "Pata Pata"	5	5	5	Bottom three
3	Samba / "Party in the U.S.A."	6	6	6	Eliminated

=== Season 23 with celebrity partner Maureen McCormick ===
Week #	Dance/Song	Judges' score				Result
Week #	Dance/Song	Inaba	Goodman	J. Hough	Tonioli	Result
1	Viennese Waltz / "(You Make Me Feel Like) A Natural Woman"	6	5	5	6	No Elimination
2	Quickstep / "The Brady Bunch"	7	6	6	7	Safe
3	Salsa / "Tres Deseos"	7	7	7	7	Safe (Immunity)
4	Argentine Tango / "High Bar"	8	—	8	8	Safe
5	Foxtrot / "From the Ground Up"	8	—	8	8	No Elimination
6	Samba / "Mas que Nada"	8	7^{1}	8	8	Safe
7	Tango / "You Give Love a Bad Name"; Team Freestyle / "The Skye Boat Song"	7; 10	7; 9	7; 9	7; 10	Eliminated

^{1} Score given by guest judge Pitbull.

=== Season 24 with celebrity partner Nancy Kerrigan ===
Week #	Dance/Song	Judges' score				Result
Week #	Dance/Song	Inaba	Goodman	J. Hough	Tonioli	Result
1	Viennese Waltz / "She's Always a Woman"	7	7	7	7	No Elimination
2	Cha-cha-cha / "No Rights No Wrongs"	7	7	7	7	Safe
3	Samba / "Shake Your Bon-Bon"	8	9	8	8	Safe
4	Foxtrot / "My Wish"	8	9	8	8	Safe
5	Jazz / "That's How You Know"	9	9	9	9	Safe
6	Paso Doble / "Free Your Mind"; Team Freestyle / "My Boyfriend's Back", "No Scrubs" & "BO$$"	9; 8	8; 8	8^{1} 9^{1}	8; 9	Last to be called safe
7	Tango / "Oh, Pretty Woman"; Cha-cha-cha Dance-Off / "Crave"	9 No	9 Extra	9^{2} Points	9 Awarded	Eliminated

^{1} Score given by guest judge Nick Carter.
^{2} Score given by guest judge Mandy Moore.

=== Season 25 with celebrity partner Nikki Bella ===
Week #	Dance/Song	Judges' score			Result
Week #	Dance/Song	Inaba	Goodman	Tonioli	Result
1	Tango / "So What"	7	7	6	No Elimination
2	Waltz / "Come Away with Me"; Samba / "Despacito"	7; 6	7; 6	7; 6	Safe
3	Viennese Waltz / "Love on the Brain"	7	7	7	No Elimination
4	Contemporary / "Fight Song"	8	8	8	Safe
5	Jazz / "Remember Me"	9	9	9	Safe
6	Argentine Tango / "Dernière danse"	9	9/9^{1}	9	Safe
7	Jive / "I Put a Spell on You"; Team Freestyle / "Monster Mash"	8; 8	8; 8	8; 8	Eliminated

^{1} Score given by guest judge Shania Twain

=== Season 26 with celebrity partner Jamie Anderson ===
Week #	Dance/Song	Judges' score			Result
Week #	Dance/Song	Inaba	Goodman	Tonioli	Result
1	Viennese Waltz / "Feeling Good"	6	7	6	Eliminated

=== Season 27 with celebrity partner Danelle Umstead ===
Week #	Dance/Song	Judges' score			Result
Week #	Dance/Song	Inaba	Goodman	Tonioli	Result
1	Foxtrot / "Rise Up"; Foxtrot / "Strong Ones"	6; 6	6; 6	6; 6	Safe
2	Cha-cha-cha / "Welcome to New York"; Quickstep / "Luck Be a Lady"	6; 7	6; 6	6; 6	Eliminated

=== Season 29 with celebrity partner Kaitlyn Bristowe ===
Week #	Dance/Song	Judges' score			Result
Week #	Dance/Song	Inaba	D. Hough	Tonioli	Result
1	Cha-cha-cha / "Stupid Love"	7	7	7	No Elimination
2	Foxtrot / "I Hope You Dance"	7	8	7	Safe
3	Rumba / "How Far I'll Go"	8	7	8	Safe
4	Viennese Waltz / "Beautiful Crazy"	8	8	8	Safe
5	Tango / "I Think We're Alone Now"	9	9	9	Safe
6	Samba / "Sorry"	9	9	9	Safe
7	Paso doble / "Disturbia"	7	9	8	Safe
8	Jive / "Don't Stop Me Now"; Samba Relay / "Levitating"	8 Awarded	9; 3	8 points	Safe
9 Quarter-finals	Argentine tango / "Toxic"; Cha-cha-cha Dance-Off / "Telephone"	10; No	10 points	10 given	Safe
10; Semi-finals	Paso doble / "Hanuman"; Contemporary / "Cowboy Take Me Away"	10; 10	10; 10	10; 10	Safe
11; Finals	Argentine tango / "Toxic"; Freestyle / "Sparkling Diamonds" from Moulin Rouge!	10; 10	10; 10	10; 10	Winners

=== Season 30 with celebrity partner Melora Hardin ===
Week #	Dance/Song	Judges' score				Result
Week #	Dance/Song	Inaba	Goodman	D. Hough	Tonioli	Result
1	Tango / "Simply Irresistible"	7	6	7	6	No Elimination
2	Rumba / "All by Myself"	7	6	7	7	Safe
3	Cha-cha-cha / "(You Drive Me) Crazy (The Stop! Remix)"	8	7	8	8	Safe
4	Quickstep / "I Wan'na Be Like You"; Jazz / "Mother Knows Best"	9; 9	9; 10	9; 9	9; 9	Safe
5	Viennese waltz / "Look at Me, I'm Sandra Dee"	9	9	9	9	Safe
6	Jive / "Hound Dog"	8	9	8	9	Safe
7	Foxtrot / "Killer Queen"; Viennese waltz relay / "We Are the Champions"	9 Awarded	9; 2	9 extra	9 points	Safe
8	Paso doble / "If"; Foxtrot dance-off / "Again"	10; Awarded	10; 2	10 extra	10 points	Bottom three
9	Rumba / "I Don't Want to Wait"; Contemporary / "Thunder"	8; 9	10; 9	9; 9	9; 9	Eliminated

=== Season 31 with celebrity partner Heidi D'Amelio ===
Week #	Dance/Song	Judges' score				Result
Week #	Dance/Song	Inaba	Goodman	D. Hough	Tonioli	Result
1	Cha-cha-cha / "Lady Marmalade"	6	6	6	6	No Elimination
2	Foxtrot / "Suspicious Minds"	7	7	7	7	Safe
3	Argentine tango / "Another Way to Die"	8	8	8	8	Safe
4	Viennese Waltz / "Chim Chim Cher-ee"	9	8	8	9	Safe
5	Rumba / "Can't Take My Eyes Off of You (I Love You Baby)"; Jazz / "Girls Just Want To Have Fun"	9; 8	9; 9	9; 8	9; 8	Bottom two
6	Samba / "It had Better Be Tonight (Meglio stasera)"	9	9	10^{1}/9	9	Safe
7	Tango / "I Wanna Be Your Slave"; Team Freestyle / "The Witches Are Back"	9; 8	9; 8	10; 9	9; 8	Bottom two
8	Contemporary / "Ironic"; Samba relay / "Shoop"	9 Awarded	8; 0	9 Extra	9 Points	Eliminated

^{1} Score given by guest judge Michael Buble.

=== Season 32 with celebrity partner Charity Lawson ===
Week #	Dance/Song	Judges' score				Result
Week #	Dance/Song	Inaba	D. Hough	Tonioli	Guest	Result
1	Tango / "Only Girl (In the World)"	7	7	8		Safe
2^{1}	Cha-Cha-Cha / "She Bangs"	7	7	7		Safe
3	Foxtrot / "My Girl"	8	8	8	8^{2}	Safe
4	Waltz / "Part of Your World"	8	8	8		Safe
5	Contemporary / "Lose You to Love Me"	10	9	9		Safe
6	Jive / "Skeleton Sam"; Hustle & Charleston Marathon / "Stayin' Alive" & "Grim Grinning Ghosts"	9 Awarded	9; 3	9 Extra	8^{3} Points	Safe
7	Jazz / "All for You"; Team Freestyle / "Gangnam Style"	8; 10	8; 10	8; 10	8^{4} 10^{4}	Safe
8	Viennese Waltz / "I Will Always Love You"; Cha-Cha-Cha dance-off / "So Emotional"	9 Awarded	9; 3	9 Extra	9^{5} Points	Safe
9 Quarter-finals	Argentine Tango / "Look What You Made Me Do"; Cha-Cha-Cha relay / "Lavender Haze (Felix Jaehn Remix)"	9 Awarded	10; 0	10; Extra	9^{6} Points	Safe
10; Semi-Finals	Rumba / "Love the Way You Lie (Part III)"; Quickstep / "Boss"	10; 10	9; 10	10; 10		No elimination
11; Final	Tango / "Libertango"; Freestyle / "Lose My Breath" & "Suéltate"	9; 10	10; 10	10; 10		Fourth place

^{1} Artem Chigvintsev tested positive for COVID-19, so Charity Lawson performed with Ezra Sosa instead.
^{2} Score given by guest judge Michael Strahan.
^{3} Score given by guest judge Niecy Nash-Betts.
^{4} Score given by guest judge Paula Abdul.
^{5} Score given by guest judge Billy Porter.
^{6} Score given by guest judge Mandy Moore (choreographer).

== So You Think You Can Dance ==
In 2011, Chigvintsev was a choreographer on the British adaptation of So You Think You Can Dance. He choreographed a Viennese Waltz to "She's Always a Woman" by Billy Joel for Katie Love & Luke Jackson. He choreographed a Cha-Cha-Cha to "Judas" by Lady Gaga for Bethany Rose Harrison & Lee Bridgman. For the final, he choreographed a Tango to "I've Seen That Face Before (Libertango)" by Grace Jones for Katie Love & Luke Jackson.

== Other work ==
In 2009, he appeared in the music video for Hush Hush; Hush Hush by The Pussycat Dolls, dancing with Nicole Scherzinger.

In 2011, Chigvintsev acted the part of lead choreographer in the CBeebies Christmas Pantomime, Strictly Cinderella.

Chigvintsev has also appeared in an episode of the TV show The O.C. and in the movie I Now Pronounce You Chuck and Larry.

In October 2020, he made a guest appearance in an episode, “Sister, Sister and a Babymoon” of the American reality TV show, Keeping Up with the Kardashians to teach Kris Jenner and her boyfriend ballroom dancing. He has also made another guest appearance on another American reality TV show, Paris in Love. In an episode, "Too Close for Carter," in January 2022 to teach Paris Hilton and her former fiancé now husband some dance moves for their wedding reception.

Chigvintsev appeared as a main cast member on the E! reality show, Total Bellas, for the show's fifth and sixth season.

== Personal life ==
=== Relationships and family ===
Chigvintsev was married to his dancing partner, Giselle Peacock, from 2004 to 2005. He dated Carrie Ann Inaba from 2006 to 2008.

Chigvintsev and Kara Tointon were paired as partners on Strictly Come Dancing in 2010, which they went on to win. They went on to have a four-year relationship.

Chigvintsev became a naturalized U.S. citizen on September 17, 2014. In November 2019, he got engaged to Total Bellas star, and WWE wrestler, Nikki Bella, who was his celebrity partner on the 25th season of Dancing with the Stars. On January 29, 2020, Nikki and Artem announced they were expecting their first child, just a week and a half after Nikki's twin sister, Brie, announced she was expecting her second child. Bella gave birth to their son Matteo Artemovich Chigvintsev on July 31, 2020. The pair got married on August 26, 2022. However, Bella later filed for divorce in September 2024, citing "irreconcilable differences." Bella also sought "legal and physical custody" of Matteo, but only requested that Chigvintsev be allowed child visitation. Both were granted restraining orders against each other.

=== Legal issues and controversies ===
In 2015, Fern Britton accused Chigvintsev of kicking, shoving and joking about killing her during training sessions they held in 2012 while they were dance partners on Strictly Come Dancing, a claim which he denied. On August 29, 2024, Chigvintsev was booked into Napa County Jail on a felony domestic violence charge. He would be released later that day after posting a $25,000 bail. Police would afterwards publicly release his mugshot. According to arrest records, the incident was subjected to penal code 273.5(a), which relates to domestic violence against either "a spouse, cohabitant or fellow parent." It was later revealed Chigvintsev inflicted "corporal injury to spouse." Nikki, Chigvintsev's spouse, would not publicly discuss the incident, with a rep describing it as a "private matter." On September 11, 2024, Nikki filed for divorce. On September 24, 2024, Napa County District Attorney, Allison Haley, announced that her office has declined to file criminal charges against Artem Chigvintsev. Noting "[T]he decision to not file charges against Mr. Chigvintsev was made after a thorough review of the criminal investigation and careful evaluation of the evidence presented to the DA’s Office." She noted there was not enough evidence to prove that Artem did in fact inflict injury to his then-wife. Nikki sought full custody of the child when she filed for divorce, requesting Artem have supervised visitation with their son and undergo anger management classes. However, after a court hearing in Napa County, it was announced the parents will share joint custody of their child Matteo, as Artem had previously requested when he submitted his divorce response in September.

Awards and achievements
Preceded by Hannah Brown & Alan Bersten	Dancing with the Stars (US) winner Season 29 (Fall 2020 with Kaitlyn Bristowe)	Succeeded by Iman Shumpert & Daniella Karagach
Preceded by Shangela & Gleb Savchenko	Dancing with the Stars (US) fourth place contestant Season 32 (Fall 2023 with Charity Lawson)	Succeeded by Stephen Nedoroscik & Rylee Arnold
Preceded by Skai Jackson & Alan Bersten; Johnny Weir & Britt Stewart	Dancing with the Stars (US) semi-finalist Season 30 (Fall 2021 with Melora Hardin)	Succeeded by Trevor Donovan & Emma Slater; Daniel Durant & Britt Stewart
Preceded by Barbara Corcoran & Keo Motsepe	Dancing with the Stars (US) last place Season 26 (Spring 2018 with Jamie Anderson)	Succeeded by Nikki Glaser & Gleb Savchenko
