= Pasha Pashkov =

Russian-American professional dancer (born 1986)

- Па́ша Пашков
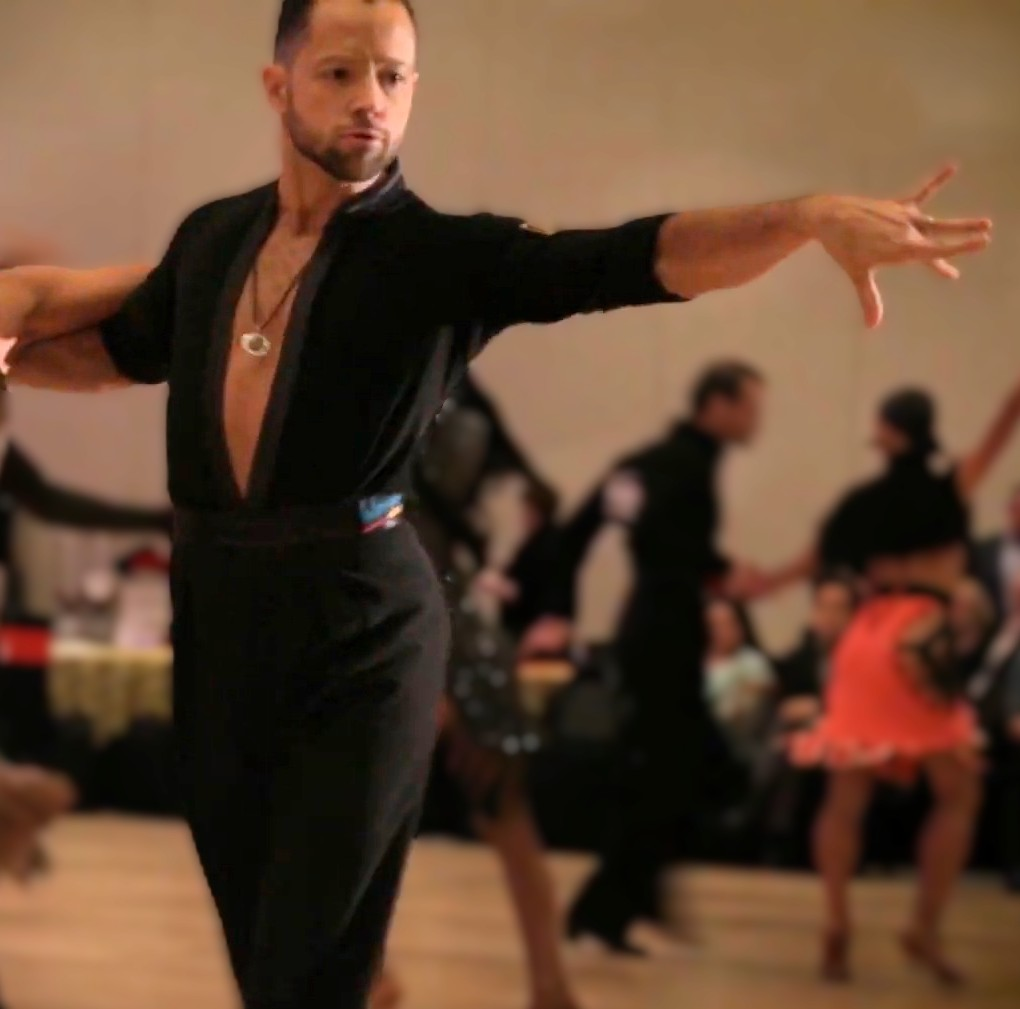
- Pashkov in 2019
- Born: Pavel Valeryevich Pashkov; 28 May 1986 (age 40); Perm, Russian SFSR, Soviet Union (now Russia)
- Education: Baruch College (BBA)
- Occupations: Dancer; choreographer
- Television: America's Ballroom Challenge; World of Dance; Dancing with the Stars
- Spouse: Daniella Karagach (m. 2014)
- Children: 1

Pavel Valeryevich "Pasha" Pashkov (Russian: Па́вел Валерьевич Пашков; born 28 May 1986) is a Russian and American professional Latin and ballroom dancer and choreographer. He began his career in dancesport and rose to prominence as a contestant on the second season of the NBC competition series World of Dance with his wife, Daniella Karagach.

Pashkov continued his competitive dancing career by joining the ABC competition series Dancing with the Stars as a pro in September 2019.

== Early life ==
Pavel Valeryevich Pashkov was born on 28 May 1986 in Perm, Russian SFSR (present-day Russia), to Valeriy Pashkov and Tatiana Pashkova. From a young age, he was involved in sports such as tennis, swimming, and taekwondo. Pashkov first became interested in dance when he was eleven years old, through taking a standard ballroom class in school with his older brother. Their teacher thought that Pashkov had potential and encouraged him to train at her separate dance school. After he performed in his first competition, Pashkov stopped dancing for a while due to scheduling conflicts.

Pashkov immigrated to the United States with his family when he was fifteen years old, after his father won a green card in the visa lottery. They first lived in Ohio, where he struggled to continue his ballroom dance training. "Not that there is no ballroom dancing in Ohio," he clarified. "But in the area we were, there were only social dance clubs so there was no competitive dance studios, no partners, no coaches." Pashkov moved to the New York City borough of Brooklyn on his own after he eventually found a partner. He attended Baruch College in Manhattan, where he earned a bachelor's degree in finance.

== Personal life ==
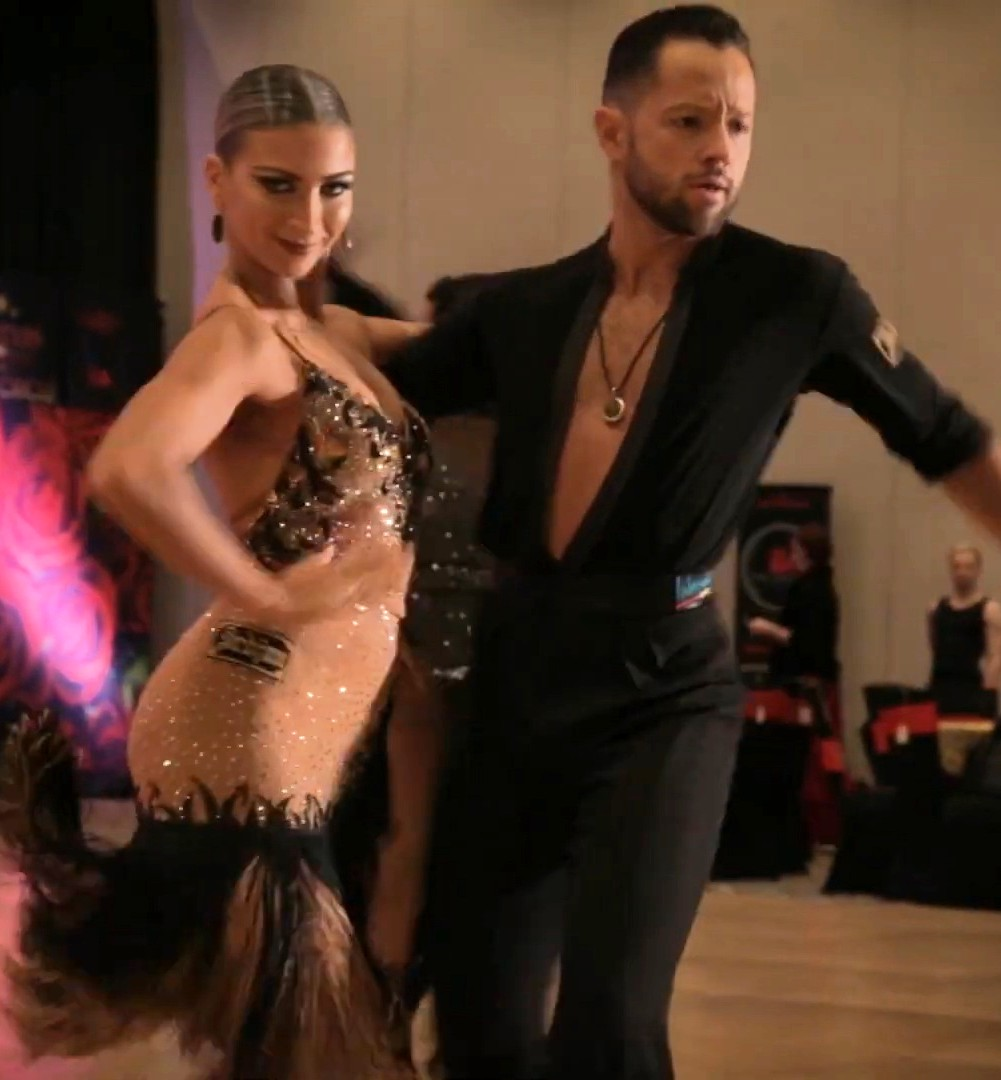
Pashkov performing with his wife, Daniella Karagach, in 2019

Pashkov met American professional dancer Daniella Karagach through their respective coaches; he was 22 years old at the time, and she was 16. They began dating amidst their training in 2011. Pashkov proposed on 1 January 2012, and they were married on 18 July 2014. They launched an online dance program in 2020 to prepare engaged couples for their first dance. On 19 July 2025, to commemorate their eleventh wedding anniversary, Pashkov and Karagach renewed their vows in Cabo San Lucas, Mexico.

In November 2022, Pashkov and Karagach announced that they were expecting a rainbow baby after Karagach suffered a miscarriage at five weeks gestation. Their daughter, Nikita Sofia Pashkova, was born on 30 May 2023.

== Career ==
=== Dancing with the Stars ===
In September 2019, Pashkov joined the ABC competition series Dancing with the Stars as a professional dancer. He was partnered with The Office actress Kate Flannery for the twenty-eighth season. They were unexpectedly eliminated during the eighth week of competition on 4 November 2019, finishing in seventh place. For the twenty-ninth season, Pashkov was partnered with Tiger King cast member Carole Baskin. They were eliminated during the third week of competition on 28 September 2020, finishing in fourteenth place.

For season 30, Pashkov was paired with Bling Empire cast member Christine Chiu. They were eliminated during the third week of competition on 4 October 2021, finishing in fourteenth place. For season 31, Pashkov was partnered with The Real Housewives of New Jersey cast member Teresa Giudice. They were eliminated during the second week of competition, finishing in fifteenth place; Pashkov's lowest placement to date. For season 32, Pashkov was paired with Vanderpump Rules cast member Ariana Madix. The couple made it to the finale, where they finished in third place on 5 December 2023. It marked Pashkov's first appearance in the finale and his highest placement to date.

For season 33, Pashkov was partnered with film and television actress Tori Spelling. They were eliminated during the second week of competition on 24 September 2024 in a double elimination alongside Anna Delvey and Ezra Sosa; both couples finished in twelfth place. For season 34, Pashkov was paired with Boy Meets World actress Danielle Fishel. They were eliminated week 8, finishing in 8th place.

For season 35, he is paired with Olympic figure skater Amber Glenn.

Season	Partner	Place
28	Kate Flannery	7th
29	Carole Baskin	14th
30	Christine Chiu	14th
31	Teresa Giudice	15th
32	Ariana Madix	3rd
33	Tori Spelling	12th
34	Danielle Fishel	8th
35	Amber Glenn	TBD

==== Season 28 ====
Celebrity partner: Kate Flannery

Week	Dance	Music	Judges' scores (Note: Individual judges' scores are listed in the following order: Carrie Ann Inaba, Len Goodman, Bruno Tonioli.)			Total score	Result
1	Cha-cha-cha	"She Works Hard for the Money" — Donna Summer	5	5	5	15	No Elimination
2	Foxtrot	"Fly Me to the Moon" — Frank Sinatra	7	7	7	21	Safe
3	Quickstep	"9 to 5" — Dolly Parton	8	8	8	24	Safe
4	Argentine tango	"Hands to Myself" — Selena Gomez	7	6	6	26 (Note: Kate and Pasha also received a score of 7 from guest judge Leah Remini.)	Safe
5	Jazz	"A Spoonful of Sugar" — Julie Andrews	8	8	8	24	No Elimination
6	Viennese waltz	"I Have Nothing" — Whitney Houston	9	9	9	27	Safe
7	Rumba	"Wicked Game" — Chris Isaak	8	8	8	24	Bottom two
7	Freestyle (Team Treat)	"Sweet Dreams" — Beyoncé	8	8	8	24	Bottom two
8	Jive	"Heat Wave" — Linda Ronstadt	8	8	8	24	Eliminated
8	Cha-cha-cha Dance-off	"Gonna Make You Sweat (Everybody Dance Now)" — C+C Music Factory	+2			2 (Note: Kate and Pasha received 2 extra points for winning the dance-off.)	Eliminated
9 (Quarterfinals)	Paso doble	"Bring Me to Life" — Evanescence	9	9	10	28	Safe
9 (Quarterfinals)	Rumba (Dance-off)	"The Boy Is Mine" — Brandy & Monica	Winners			(28+2=30)	Safe
10 (Semifinals)	Salsa	"Bemba Colorá" — Celia Cruz	10	10	10	30	Safe
10 (Semifinals)	Viennese Waltz	"Dangerous Woman" — Ariana Grande	10	10	10	30	Safe
11 (Finals)	TBA	TBA					TBA
11 (Finals)	TBA	TBA					TBA
11 (Finals)	Freestyle	TBA					TBA

==== Season 29 ====
Celebrity partner: Carole Baskin

Week	Dance	Music	Judges' scores (Note: Individual judges' scores are listed in the following order: Carrie Ann Inaba, Derek Hough, Bruno Tonioli.)			Total score	Result
1	Paso doble	"Eye of the Tiger" — Survivor	4	4	3	11	No Elimination
2	Viennese waltz	"What's New Pussycat?" — Tom Jones	6	5	5	16	Bottom two
3	Samba	"Circle of Life" — Carmen Twillie & Lebo M	5	4	3	12	Eliminated

==== Season 30 ====
Celebrity partner: Christine Chiu

Week	Dance	Music	Judges' scores (Note: Individual judges' scores are listed in the following order: Carrie Ann Inaba, Len Goodman, Derek Hough, Bruno Tonioli.)				Total score	Result
1	Tango	"Glamorous" — Fergie & Ludacris	6	7	6	6	25	No Elimination
2	Salsa	"Despacito" — Daddy Yankee & Luis Fonsi	6	6	6	6	24	Bottom two
3	Paso doble	"Stronger" — Britney Spears	7	7	—N/a	7	21 (Note: Due to Derek Hough's absence, scores were given on a 30 point scale.)	Eliminated

==== Season 31 ====
Celebrity partner: Teresa Giudice

Week	Dance	Music	Judges' scores (Note: Individual judges' scores are listed in the following order: Carrie Ann Inaba, Len Goodman, Derek Hough, Bruno Tonioli.)				Total score	Result
1	Tango	"We Found Love" — Rihanna & Calvin Harris	5	5	5	5	20	Bottom two
2	Jive	"All Shook Up" — Elvis Presley	6	5	6	6	23	Eliminated

==== Season 32 ====
Celebrity partner: Ariana Madix

Week	Dance	Music	Judges' scores (Note: Individual judges' scores are listed in the following order: Carrie Ann Inaba, Derek Hough, Bruno Tonioli.)			Total score	Result
1	Tango	"Love Myself (Riddler Remix)" — Hailee Steinfeld	7	7	7	21	Safe
2	Samba	"Me Porto Bonito" — Bad Bunny & Chencho Corleone	6	7	7	20	Safe
3	Quickstep	"You Can't Hurry Love" — The Supremes	9	8	8	34 (Note: Ariana and Pasha also received a score of 9 from guest judge Michael Strahan.)	Safe
4	Contemporary	"Into the Unknown" — Idina Menzel & Aurora	8	9	8	25	Safe
5	Viennese waltz	"Happier Than Ever" — Billie Eilish	8	8	8	24	Safe
6	Argentine tango	"Bad Guy" — Billie Eilish	9	9	10	37 (Note: Ariana and Pasha also received a score of 9 from guest judge Niecy Nash-Betts.)	Safe
6	Hustle & Charleston Marathon	"Stayin' Alive" — Bee Gees "Grim Grinning Ghosts" — Kris Bowers	—N/a			4 (Note: Ariana and Pasha also received 4 points from the dance marathon.)	Safe
7	Cha-cha-cha	"I'm a Slave 4 U" — Britney Spears	9	9	9	37 (Note: Ariana and Pasha also received a score of 10 from guest judge Paula Abdul.)	Safe
7	Freestyle (Team 4 Everybody)	"Everybody (Backstreet's Back)" — Backstreet Boys	9	9	9	37 (Note: The team dance also received a score of 10 from guest judge Paula Abdul.)	Safe
8	Paso doble	"Queen of the Night" — Whitney Houston	9	10	10	39 (Note: Ariana and Pasha also received a score of 10 from guest judge Billy Porter.)+3 (Note: Ariana and Pasha were exempt from the dance-off, but they automatically received three bonus points for having finished first at the end of the first round the previous week.)	Safe
9	Rumba	"Cruel Summer" — Taylor Swift	9	9	10	37 (Note: Ariana and Pasha also received a score of 9 from guest judge Mandy Moore.)	Safe
9	Viennese waltz (Dance relay)	"Lover" — Taylor Swift	Loser			0 (Note: Ariana and Pasha did not receive any points for losing the relay.)	Safe
10 (Semifinals)	Jive	"Runaway Baby" — Bruno Mars	9	9	10	28	Safe
10 (Semifinals)	Foxtrot	"Trampoline" — Shaed & Zayn	10	10	10	30	Safe
11 (Finals)	Samba	"Spice Up Your Life" — Spice Girls	9	10	10	29	Third place
11 (Finals)	Freestyle	"Run the World (Girls)" — Beyoncé "Level Up" — Ciara	10	10	10	30	Third place

==== Season 33 ====
Celebrity partner: Tori Spelling

Week	Dance	Music	Judges' scores (Note: Individual judges' scores are listed in the following order: Carrie Ann Inaba, Derek Hough, Bruno Tonioli.)			Total score	Result
1	Foxtrot	"Trustfall" — Pink	6	6	5	17	No Elimination
2	Rumba	"This Is Me" — Keala Settle & The Greatest Showman Ensemble	7	6	6	19	Eliminated

==== Season 34 ====
Celebrity partner: Danielle Fishel

Week	Dance	Music	Judges' scores (Note: Individual judges' scores are listed in the following order: Carrie Ann Inaba, Derek Hough, Bruno Tonioli.)			Total score	Result
1	Tango	"Stronger (What Doesn't Kill You)" — Kelly Clarkson	—N/a	6	6	12 (Note: Due to Carrie Ann Inaba's absence, scores were given on a 20 point scale.)	No Elimination
2	Cha-cha-cha	"The Rhythm of the Night" — Corona	7	6	6	19	Safe
3	Foxtrot	"Manchild" — Sabrina Carpenter	7	7	7	21	Safe
4	Quickstep	"I Wan’na Be Like You (The Monkey Song)" — Louis Prima and Phil Harris	7	7	7	21	Safe
5	Jive	"Boy Meets World (Theme)" — Twenty Cent Crush feat. Phil Rosenthal	7	7	8	29 (Note: Danielle and Pasha also received a score of 7 from guest judge Kym Johnson.)	No Elimination
6	Argentine tango	"No Good Deed" — Cynthia Erivo	9	9	9	36 (Note: Danielle and Pasha also received a score of 7 from guest judge Jon M. Chu.)	Safe
7	Viennese waltz	"Die with a Smile" — Lady Gaga & Bruno Mars	8	8	9	33 (Note: Danielle and Pasha also received a score of 8 from guest judge Cheryl Burke.)	Safe
7	Hustle & Lindy Hop Marathon	"Murder on the Dancefloor" — Sophie Ellis-Bextor "A Little Party Never Killed Nobody (All We Got)" — Fergie, Q-Tip, & GoonRock	—N/a			2 (Note: Danielle and Pasha also received 2 bonus points from the dance marathon.)	Safe
8	Contemporary	"Dream On" — Aerosmith	9	8	8	34 (Note: Danielle and Pasha also received a score of 9 from guest judge Flavor Flav.)	Eliminated
8	Freestyle (Team Chicago)	"25 or 6 to 4" — Chicago	10	10	10	40 (Note: The team dance also received a score of 10 from guest judge Flavor Flav.)	Eliminated

==== Season 35 ====
Celebrity partner: Amber Glenn

Week	Dance	Music	Judges' scores (Note: Individual judges' scores are listed in the following order: Carrie Ann Inaba, Derek Hough, Bruno Tonioli.)			Total score	Result
1	Cha-cha-cha	"Smooth" — Santana feat. Rob Thomas	6	6	6	18	Safe
2	Tango	"All the Things She Said" — Harrison	7	7	7	21	Safe
3	Foxtrot	"Hold the Line" – Toto	8	8	8	24	Safe
4	Rumba	"Hero" — Mariah Carey	7	8	8	23	Safe
5	Samba	"Mi Gente" – J Balvin and Willy William	8	9	8	34 (Note: Amber and Pasha also received a score of 9 from guest judge Joe Buck.)	Safe
6	Contemporary	"Breathe Me" — Sia	10	9	9	38 (Note: Amber and Pasha also received a score of 10 from guest judge Kym Johnson.)	Safe
7	Argentine tango	"Perfection" — Clint Mansell	9	9	9	36 (Note: Amber and Pasha also received a score of 9 from guest judge Shirley Ballas.)	Safe
8	Quickstep	"A Star Is Born" (from Hercules)	8	9	9	34 (Note: Amber and Pasha also received a score of 8 from guest judge Cynthia Erivo.)	Safe
8	Freestyle (Team Slaytopia)	"Zoo" (from Zootopia 2)	9	9	9	36 (Note: Team Slaytopia also received a score of 9 from guest judge Cynthia Erivo.)	Safe
9 (Quarterfinals)	Paso doble	"Bring Me to Life" — Evanescence	TBA				TBA
9 (Quarterfinals)	Rumba (Dance-off)	"The Boy Is Mine" — Brandy & Monica	TBA				TBA
