= Dancing with the Stars (American TV series) season 31 =

Dancing with the Stars
- Season 31
- Promotional poster featuring pro dancers Witney Carson, Brandon Armstrong, Artem Chigvintsev, Cheryl Burke, Daniella Karagach, Pasha Pashkov
- Hosted by: Tyra Banks; Alfonso Ribeiro
- Judges: Carrie Ann Inaba; Len Goodman; Bruno Tonioli; Derek Hough
- Celebrity winner: Charli D'Amelio
- Professional winner: Mark Ballas
- No. of episodes: 11

Release
- Original network: Disney+
- Original release: September 19 – November 21, 2022

Season chronology
- ← Previous; Season 30 Next → Season 32

Season thirty-one of Dancing with the Stars premiered on Disney+ on September 19, 2022, and concluded on November 21, 2022. This season marked the first live competition show to air on the streaming platform and the only season to not air on ABC. Tyra Banks returned as host, while season nineteen champion Alfonso Ribeiro joined as co-host.

Social media personality Charli D'Amelio and Mark Ballas were crowned the champions, while The Bachelorette star Gabby Windey and Val Chmerkovskiy finished in second place, comedian Wayne Brady and Witney Carson finished in third place, and drag queen Shangela and Gleb Savchenko finished in fourth.

This marked the last season for host Tyra Banks and longtime judge Len Goodman, who retired at the conclusion of the season, prior to his death five months later.

== Cast ==
=== Couples ===
This season featured sixteen celebrity contestants. On August 25, 2022, it was reported that Charli D'Amelio and her mother Heidi D'Amelio would be competing as celebrity participants. Soon after, Joseph Baena, Wayne Brady, Daniel Durant, Jordin Sparks, Gabby Windey, and Trevor Donovan were all reported as celebrity participants as well. Charli and Heidi D'Amelio were officially announced as part of the season's cast on September 7, with the full roster of celebrity participants and their partnerships officially revealed on Good Morning America the following day. With sixteen couples, this season was tied with season nine as having the largest cast in the show's history.

A promo for the season released on August 18 featured professional dancers Daniella Karagach, Pasha Pashkov, Artem Chigvintsev, Witney Carson, Brandon Armstrong, and Cheryl Burke. Britt Stewart, Peta Murgatroyd, Emma Slater, Koko Iwasaki, Val Chmerkovskiy, Alan Bersten, Gleb Savchenko, and Louis van Amstel were later revealed to be the rest of the professional dancers for the season. Mark Ballas was announced as a pro on September 8. Sasha Farber was initially reported to be a troupe member this season, but was later revealed to also be returning as a pro. Three pro dancers from the previous season did not return, Jenna Johnson, Sharna Burgess, and Lindsay Arnold. Johnson was pregnant with her first child at the time, while Arnold wanted to spend time with her family. Iwasaki, who was the runner-up on season 14 of So You Think You Can Dance and performed as part of the Dancing with the Stars Live! – 2022 Tour, joined the show as a first-time pro.

On September 26, 2022, it was announced that Daniella Karagach had COVID-19 and would miss that night's performance. Alexis Warr replaced her as Joseph Baena's dance partner for two weeks. On October 28, 2022, it was announced that Val Chmerkovskiy had COVID-19 and would miss the October 31 episode. Alan Bersten filled in for him as Gabby Windey's partner for the episode.

On November 20, 2022, professional dancer Cheryl Burke announced her retirement from the show after 26 seasons.

Cast of Dancing with the Stars (season 31)
Celebrity	Notability	Professional partner	Status	Ref.
Jason Lewis	Sex and the City actor	Peta Murgatroyd	Eliminated 1st on September 19, 2022	
Teresa Giudice	The Real Housewives of New Jersey cast member	Pasha Pashkov	Eliminated 2nd on September 26, 2022	
Cheryl Ladd	Charlie's Angels actress & author	Louis van Amstel	Eliminated 3rd on October 3, 2022	
Sam Champion	Good Morning America meteorologist	Cheryl Burke	Eliminated 4th on October 10, 2022	
Selma Blair	Film & television actress	Sasha Farber	Withdrew on October 17, 2022	
Joseph Baena	Professional bodybuilder & actor	Daniella Karagach; Alexis Warr (Weeks 2–3)	Eliminated 5th on October 18, 2022	
Jessie James Decker	Country singer	Alan Bersten	Eliminated 6th on October 24, 2022	
Jordin Sparks	Singer-songwriter & actress	Brandon Armstrong	Eliminated 7th on October 31, 2022	
Heidi D'Amelio	Social media personality	Artem Chigvintsev	Eliminated 8th on November 7, 2022	
Vinny Guadagnino	Jersey Shore cast member	Koko Iwasaki	Eliminated 9th on November 7, 2022	
Trevor Donovan	Actor & model	Emma Slater	Eliminated 10th on November 14, 2022	
Daniel Durant	Film & television actor	Britt Stewart	Eliminated 11th on November 14, 2022	
Shangela	Drag queen & RuPaul's Drag Race contestant	Gleb Savchenko	Fourth place on November 21, 2022	
Wayne Brady	Comedian, actor & television personality	Witney Carson	Third place on November 21, 2022	
Gabby Windey	The Bachelorette star	Val Chmerkovskiy; Alan Bersten (Week 7)	Runners-up on November 21, 2022	
Charli D'Amelio	Social media personality & dancer	Mark Ballas	Winners on November 21, 2022	

=== Host and judges ===
On July 14, 2022, it was announced that Tyra Banks would return as host, with Len Goodman, Derek Hough, Carrie Ann Inaba, and Bruno Tonioli returning as judges. Additionally, it was announced that season nineteen champion Alfonso Ribeiro would be joining the show alongside Banks as co-host. On October 24, Michael Bublé served as a guest judge.

During the semifinals, Goodman announced that this would be his final season as a judge.

=== Dance troupe ===
The dance troupe returned for season 31 after being absent for the previous three seasons and consisted of returning pro Ezra Sosa and new pros Kateryna Klishyna, Alexis Warr, and D'Angelo Castro.

== Episodes ==
No. overall	No. in season	Title	Original release date
471	1	"Premiere Night Party"	September 19, 2022
472	2	"Elvis Night"	September 26, 2022
473	3	"Bond Night"	October 3, 2022
474	4	"Disney+ Night"	October 10, 2022
475	5	"Most Memorable Year"	October 17, 2022
476	6	"Prom Night"	October 18, 2022
477	7	"Michael Bublé Night"	October 24, 2022
478	8	"Halloween Night"	October 31, 2022
479	9	"'90s Night"	November 7, 2022
480	10	"Semifinals"	November 14, 2022
481	11	"Finale"	November 21, 2022

== Scoring chart ==
The highest score each week is indicated in bold green with a dagger (†), while the lowest score each week is indicated in italicized red with a double-dagger (‡).

Color key:

Winners
Runners-up
Third place
Fourth place
Bottom two
Withdrew from competition
Eliminated

Dancing with the Stars (season 31) - Weekly scores
Couple	Pl.	Week											
Couple	Pl.	1	2	3	4	5			6 (Note: The couples were scored on a 50-point scale due to the presence of a guest judge.)	7	8	9	10
Couple	Pl.	1	2	3	4	Night 1	Night 2	1+2	6	7	8	9	10
Charli & Mark	1st	**32**†	**32**†	**33**†	**36**†	39	38+7=45	**84**†	**50**†	39+39=**78**†	40+5=**45**†	40+40=**80**†	40+40=**80**† (Note: This couple finished in first place.)
Gabby & Val	2nd	28	**32**†	**33**†	**36**†	36	40+6=**46**†	82	46	38+33=71	40	40+40=**80**†	40+40=**80**† (Note: This couple finished in second place.)
Wayne & Witney	3rd	29	**32**†	**33**†	**36**†	37	40+5=45	82	44	37+39=76	40+5=**45**†	36+37=73	36+40=76‡ (Note: This couple finished in third place.)
Shangela & Gleb	4th	28	28	30	32	32	35+10=45	77	45	40+33=73	37+5=42	36+37=73 (Note: This couple was in the bottom two, but was not eliminated.)	36+40=76‡ (Note: This couple finished in fourth place.)
Daniel & Britt	5th	27	29	31	29	34	32+1=33	67	43	34+39=73	39	35+34=69 (Note: This couple was eliminated.)	
Trevor & Emma	6th	21	30	27	28	32	32+8=40	72	42	39+39=**78**†	34+5=39	32+33=65‡	
Vinny & Koko	7th	17‡	27	23‡	29	32	28+2=30‡	62‡	36‡	30+33=63‡	29‡		
Heidi & Artem	8th	24	28	32	34	36	33+9=42	78	46	37+33=70	35		
Jordin & Brandon	9th	26	27	29	34	33	35+3=38	71	43	36+33=69			
Jessie & Alan	10th	20	25	26	31	29‡	32+11=43	72	41				
Joseph & Daniella	11th	23	24	29	28	34	32+4=36	70					
Selma & Sasha	12th	28	28	28	32	**40**† (Note: This couple withdrew from the competition.)							
Sam & Cheryl	13th	20	26	25	25‡								
Cheryl & Louis	14th	21	21‡	24									
Teresa & Pasha	15th	20	23										
Jason & Peta	16th	18											

== Weekly scores ==
Individual judges' scores in the charts below (given in parentheses) are listed in this order from left to right: Carrie Ann Inaba, Len Goodman, Derek Hough, Bruno Tonioli.

=== Week 1: Premiere Night Party ===
Couples are listed in the order they performed.

Dancing with the Stars (season 31) - Week 1
Couple	Scores	Dance	Music	Result
Jordin & Brandon	26 (7, 6, 6, 7)	Cha-cha-cha	"I Wanna Dance with Somebody (Who Loves Me)" — Whitney Houston	Safe
Sam & Cheryl	20 (5, 5, 5, 5)	Foxtrot	"Hold Me Closer" — Elton John & Britney Spears	Safe
Heidi & Artem	24 (6, 6, 6, 6)	Cha-cha-cha	"Lady Marmalade" — Christina Aguilera, Lil' Kim, Mýa & Pink	Safe
Daniel & Britt	27 (7, 6, 7, 7)	Tango	"Barbra Streisand" — Duck Sauce	Safe
Jessie & Alan	20 (5, 5, 5, 5)	Cha-cha-cha	"Sweet Home Alabama" — Lynyrd Skynyrd	Safe
Teresa & Pasha	20 (5, 5, 5, 5)	Tango	"We Found Love" — Rihanna & Calvin Harris	Bottom two
Wayne & Witney	29 (7, 7, 7, 8)	Cha-cha-cha	"She's a Bad Mama Jama (She's Built, She's Stacked)" — Carl Carlton	Safe
Cheryl & Louis	21 (6, 5, 5, 5)	Cha-cha-cha	"Got to Give It Up" — Marvin Gaye	Safe
Vinny & Koko	17 (4, 4, 5, 4)	Salsa	"Tití Me Preguntó" — Bad Bunny	Safe
Shangela & Gleb	28 (7, 7, 7, 7)	Salsa	"When I Grow Up" — The Pussycat Dolls	Safe
Trevor & Emma	21 (5, 5, 5, 6)	Quickstep	"Dancing with Myself" — Billy Idol	Safe
Gabby & Val	28 (7, 7, 7, 7)	Jive	"As It Was" — Harry Styles	Safe
Joseph & Daniella	23 (6, 5, 6, 6)	Jive	"Pump It" — Black Eyed Peas	Safe
Jason & Peta	18 (5, 4, 4, 5)	Cha-cha-cha	"Get Lucky" — Daft Punk, Pharrell Williams & Nile Rodgers	Eliminated
Selma & Sasha	28 (7, 7, 7, 7)	Viennese waltz	"The Time of My Life" — David Cook	Safe
Charli & Mark	32 (8, 8, 8, 8)	Cha-cha-cha	"Savage (Major Lazer Remix)" — Megan Thee Stallion	Safe

Judges' votes to save

- Carrie Ann: Teresa & Pasha
- Derek: Teresa & Pasha
- Bruno: Teresa & Pasha
- Len: Did not vote, but would have voted to save Teresa & Pasha

=== Week 2: Elvis Night ===
Each couple performed one unlearned dance to a song by Elvis Presley. Couples are listed in the order they performed.

Daniella Karagach tested positive for COVID-19, so Joseph Baena performed with Alexis Warr instead.

Dancing with the Stars (season 31) - Week 2
Couple	Scores	Dance	Elvis Presley music	Result
Jessie & Alan	25 (7, 6, 6, 6)	Foxtrot	"Trouble"	Safe
Jordin & Brandon	27 (7, 6, 7, 7)	Quickstep	"Hound Dog"	Safe
Sam & Cheryl	26 (6, 6, 7, 7)	Viennese waltz	"Heartbreak Hotel"	Safe
Shangela & Gleb	28 (7, 7, 7, 7)	Quickstep	"Shake, Rattle and Roll"	Safe
Teresa & Pasha	23 (6, 5, 6, 6)	Jive	"All Shook Up"	Eliminated
Daniel & Britt	29 (7, 7, 7, 8)	Jive	"King Creole"	Safe
Gabby & Val	32 (8, 8, 8, 8)	Viennese waltz	"Can't Help Falling in Love"	Safe
Vinny & Koko	27 (7, 6, 7, 7)	Quickstep	"Viva Las Vegas"	Safe
Charli & Mark	32 (8, 8, 8, 8)	Quickstep	"Bossa Nova Baby"	Safe
Selma & Sasha	28 (7, 7, 7, 7)	Jive	"Jailhouse Rock"	Safe
Cheryl & Louis	21 (5, 6, 5, 5)	Tango	"A Little Less Conversation"	Bottom two
Joseph & Alexis	24 (6, 6, 6, 6)	Viennese waltz	"If I Can Dream"	Safe
Heidi & Artem	28 (7, 7, 7, 7)	Foxtrot	"Suspicious Minds"	Safe
Trevor & Emma	30 (7, 7, 8, 8)	Rumba	"Always On My Mind"	Safe
Wayne & Witney	32 (8, 8, 8, 8)	Jive	"Burning Love"	Safe

Judges' votes to save

- Derek: Teresa & Pasha
- Bruno: Teresa & Pasha
- Carrie Ann: Cheryl & Louis
- Len: Cheryl & Louis (Since the other judges were not unanimous, Len, as head judge, made the final decision to save Cheryl & Louis.)

=== Week 3: Bond Night ===
Each couple performed one unlearned dance to a song from a James Bond film. Couples are listed in the order they performed.

Joseph Baena again performed with Alexis Warr due to Daniella Karagach recovering from COVID-19.

Dancing with the Stars (season 31) - Week 3
Couple	Scores	Dance	Music	James Bond film	Result
Charli & Mark	33 (8, 8, 8, 9)	Rumba	"No Time to Die" — Billie Eilish	No Time to Die	Safe
Cheryl & Louis	24 (6, 6, 6, 6)	Rumba	"Diamonds Are Forever" — Shirley Bassey	Diamonds Are Forever	Eliminated
Trevor & Emma	27 (7, 6, 7, 7)	Tango	"You Know My Name" — Chris Cornell	Casino Royale	Safe
Daniel & Britt	31 (8, 7, 8, 8)	Rumba	"The World Is Not Enough" — Garbage	The World Is Not Enough	Safe
Jordin & Brandon	29 (7, 7, 7, 8)	Rumba	"Licence to Kill" — Gladys Knight	Licence to Kill	Safe
Sam & Cheryl	25 (6, 6, 6, 7)	Samba	"Los Muertos Vivos Están" — Thomas Newman, feat. Tambuco	Spectre	Bottom two
Selma & Sasha	28 (7, 7, 7, 7)	Rumba	"For Your Eyes Only" — Sheena Easton	For Your Eyes Only	Safe
Wayne & Witney	33 (8, 8, 8, 9)	Tango	"The Name's Bond... James Bond" — David Arnold & Nicholas Dodd	Casino Royale	Safe
Vinny & Koko	23 (6, 5, 6, 6)	Rumba	"Thunderball" — Tom Jones	Thunderball	Safe
Heidi & Artem	32 (8, 8, 8, 8)	Argentine tango	"Another Way to Die" — Jack White & Alicia Keys	Quantum of Solace	Safe
Shangela & Gleb	30 (8, 7, 7, 8)	Rumba	"GoldenEye" — Tina Turner	GoldenEye	Safe
Jessie & Alan	26 (6, 6, 7, 7)	Rumba	"Goldfinger" — Shirley Bassey	Goldfinger	Safe
Joseph & Alexis	29 (8, 7, 7, 7)	Argentine tango	"Writing's on the Wall" — Sam Smith	Spectre	Safe
Gabby & Val	33 (8, 8, 8, 9)	Cha-cha-cha	"Die Another Day" — Madonna	Die Another Day	Safe

Judges' votes to save

- Bruno: Sam & Cheryl
- Carrie Ann: Sam & Cheryl
- Derek: Sam & Cheryl
- Len: Did not vote, but would have voted to save Sam & Cheryl

=== Week 4: Disney+ Night ===
Each couple performed one unlearned dance to a song from a film or television series featured on Disney+. Couples are listed in the order they performed.

Jenifer Lewis performed "Dig a Little Deeper" live for Shangela's Charleston.

Dancing with the Stars (season 31) - Week 4
Couple	Scores	Dance	Music	Film/Series	Result
Joseph & Daniella	28 (7, 7, 7, 7)	Charleston	"A Star Is Born" — Lillias White, LaChanze, Roz Ryan, Cheryl Freeman & Vanéese Y. Thomas	Hercules	Safe
Sam & Cheryl	25 (7, 6, 6, 6)	Paso doble	"The Greatest Show" — Hugh Jackman, Keala Settle, Zac Efron & Zendaya	The Greatest Showman	Eliminated
Jordin & Brandon	34 (9, 8, 8, 9)	Jazz	"Remember Me" — Benjamin Bratt	Coco	Safe
Wayne & Witney	36 (9, 9, 9, 9)	Jazz	"Wait for It" — Leslie Odom Jr.	Hamilton	Safe
Daniel & Britt	29 (7, 7, 7, 8)	Quickstep	"Finally Free" — Joshua Bassett	High School Musical: The Musical: The Series	Safe
Shangela & Gleb	32 (8, 8, 8, 8)	Charleston	"Dig a Little Deeper" — Jenifer Lewis	The Princess and the Frog	Safe
Heidi & Artem	34 (9, 8, 8, 9)	Viennese waltz	"Chim Chim Cher-ee" — Dick Van Dyke & Julie Andrews	Mary Poppins	Safe
Gabby & Val	36 (9, 9, 9, 9)	Quickstep	"Mr. Blue Sky" — Electric Light Orchestra	Guardians of the Galaxy Vol. 2	Safe
Trevor & Emma	28 (7, 7, 7, 7)	Samba	"Life Is a Highway" — Rascal Flatts	Cars	Bottom two
Vinny & Koko	29 (8, 7, 7, 7)	Samba	"Il gatto e la volpe" — Edoardo Bennato	Luca	Safe
Selma & Sasha	32 (8, 8, 8, 8)	Quickstep	"The Muppet Show Theme" — Jim Henson & Sam Pottle	The Muppet Show	Safe
Jessie & Alan	31 (8, 7, 8, 8)	Jive	"One Way Or Another" — Bette Midler, Sarah Jessica Parker & Kathy Najimy	Hocus Pocus 2	Safe
Charli & Mark	36 (9, 9, 9, 9)	Jazz	"The Simpsons Theme" — Danny Elfman	The Simpsons	Safe

Judges' votes to save

- Carrie Ann: Trevor & Emma
- Bruno: Trevor & Emma
- Derek: Trevor & Emma
- Len: Did not vote, but would have voted to save Trevor & Emma

=== Week 5: Stars' Stories Week ===
Night 1 (Most Memorable Year)

Each couple performed one unlearned dance to celebrate the most memorable year of their lives. Couples are listed in the order they performed.

Selma Blair announced that she had to withdraw from the competition for medical reasons, although she and Sasha Farber still performed their waltz. As a result, no one else was eliminated at the end of the night.

Dancing with the Stars (season 31) - Week 5 (Night 1)
Couple	Scores	Dance	Music	Result
Trevor & Emma	32 (8, 8, 8, 8)	Jazz	"Viva la Vida" — Coldplay	Safe
Shangela & Gleb	32 (8, 8, 8, 8)	Foxtrot	"Roar (Acoustic)" — Katy Perry	Safe
Jessie & Alan	29 (7, 7, 8, 7)	Tango	"Blue Jeans" — Jessie James Decker	Safe
Gabby & Val	36 (9, 9, 9, 9)	Foxtrot	"If the World Should Ever Stop" — JP Cooper	Safe
Joseph & Daniella	34 (9, 8, 9, 8)	Rumba	"My Way" — Frank Sinatra	Safe
Daniel & Britt	34 (8, 8, 9, 9)	Contemporary	"Both Sides, Now" — Joni Mitchell	Safe
Jordin & Brandon	33 (8, 8, 8, 9)	Salsa	"Let's Get Married (ReMarquable Remix)" — Jagged Edge, feat. RUN	Safe
Charli & Mark	39 (10, 9, 10, 10)	Contemporary	"When the Party's Over" — Lewis Capaldi	Safe
Vinny & Koko	32 (8, 8, 8, 8)	Jazz	"Levels" — Avicii	Safe
Heidi & Artem	36 (9, 9, 9, 9)	Rumba	"Can't Take My Eyes Off of You (I Love You Baby)" — Lauryn Hill	Safe
Wayne & Witney	37 (9, 9, 9, 10)	Foxtrot	"Beautiful" — Jim Brickman & Wayne Brady	Safe
Selma & Sasha	40 (10, 10, 10, 10)	Waltz	"What the World Needs Now Is Love" — Andra Day	Withdrew

Night 2 (Prom Night)

Each couple performed one unlearned dance recalling their high school prom nights, and a dance marathon to the hustle and Lindy Hop for bonus points. Couples are listed in the order they performed.

Due to Selma Blair's withdrawal, the judges' scores and viewer votes from both nights were combined.

Dancing with the Stars (season 31) - Week 5 (Night 2)
Couple	Scores	Dance	Music	Result
Daniel & Britt	32 (8, 8, 8, 8)	Cha-cha-cha	"SexyBack" — Justin Timberlake, feat. Timbaland	Safe
Heidi & Artem	33 (8, 9, 8, 8)	Jazz	"Girls Just Want to Have Fun" — Cyndi Lauper	Bottom two
Vinny & Koko	28 (7, 7, 7, 7)	Viennese waltz	"You and Me" — Lifehouse	Safe
Shangela & Gleb	35 (9, 8, 9, 9)	Cha-cha-cha	"Waiting for Tonight" — Jennifer Lopez	Safe
Charli & Mark	38 (9, 10, 9, 10)	Jive	"You Make My Dreams" — Hall & Oates	Safe
Jessie & Alan	32 (8, 8, 8, 8)	Viennese waltz	"Breakaway" — Kelly Clarkson	Safe
Gabby & Val	40 (10, 10, 10, 10)	Tango	"Good Girls Go Bad" — Cobra Starship, feat. Leighton Meester	Safe
Trevor & Emma	32 (8, 8, 8, 8)	Jive	"Basket Case" — Green Day	Safe
Joseph & Daniella	32 (8, 8, 8, 8)	Cha-cha-cha	"Shut Up and Dance" — Walk the Moon	Eliminated
Jordin & Brandon	35 (9, 8, 9, 9)	Contemporary	"No Air" — Jordin Sparks & Chris Brown	Safe
Wayne & Witney	40 (10, 10, 10, 10)	Samba	"It Takes Two" — Rob Base & DJ E-Z Rock	Safe
Daniel & Britt	1	Hustle & Lindy Hop; Marathon	"Hot Stuff" — Donna Summer & "Jump, Jive an' Wail" — The Brian Setzer Orchestra	
Vinny & Koko	2	Hustle & Lindy Hop; Marathon	"Hot Stuff" — Donna Summer & "Jump, Jive an' Wail" — The Brian Setzer Orchestra	
Jordin & Brandon	3	Hustle & Lindy Hop; Marathon	"Hot Stuff" — Donna Summer & "Jump, Jive an' Wail" — The Brian Setzer Orchestra	
Joseph & Daniella	4	Hustle & Lindy Hop; Marathon	"Hot Stuff" — Donna Summer & "Jump, Jive an' Wail" — The Brian Setzer Orchestra	
Wayne & Witney	5	Hustle & Lindy Hop; Marathon	"Hot Stuff" — Donna Summer & "Jump, Jive an' Wail" — The Brian Setzer Orchestra	
Gabby & Val	6	Hustle & Lindy Hop; Marathon	"Hot Stuff" — Donna Summer & "Jump, Jive an' Wail" — The Brian Setzer Orchestra	
Charli & Mark	7	Hustle & Lindy Hop; Marathon	"Hot Stuff" — Donna Summer & "Jump, Jive an' Wail" — The Brian Setzer Orchestra	
Trevor & Emma	8	Hustle & Lindy Hop; Marathon	"Hot Stuff" — Donna Summer & "Jump, Jive an' Wail" — The Brian Setzer Orchestra	
Heidi & Artem	9	Hustle & Lindy Hop; Marathon	"Hot Stuff" — Donna Summer & "Jump, Jive an' Wail" — The Brian Setzer Orchestra	
Shangela & Gleb	10	Hustle & Lindy Hop; Marathon	"Hot Stuff" — Donna Summer & "Jump, Jive an' Wail" — The Brian Setzer Orchestra	
Jessie & Alan	11	Hustle & Lindy Hop; Marathon	"Hot Stuff" — Donna Summer & "Jump, Jive an' Wail" — The Brian Setzer Orchestra	

Judges' votes to save

- Derek: Heidi & Artem
- Carrie Ann: Joseph & Daniella
- Bruno: Heidi & Artem
- Len: Heidi & Artem (Since the other judges were not unanimous, Len, as head judge, made the final decision to save Heidi & Artem.)

=== Week 6: Michael Bublé Night ===
Individual judges' scores are given in this order from left to right: Carrie Ann Inaba, Len Goodman, Michael Bublé, Derek Hough, Bruno Tonioli.

Each couple performed one dance to a song by Michael Bublé, who was also a guest judge. Couples are listed in the order they performed.

Bublé also performed "Sway" for the dance troupe, and "Higher" for Derek Hough and his fiancée, Hayley Erbert, who performed a dance.

Dancing with the Stars (season 31) - Week 6
Couple	Scores	Dance	Michael Bublé music	Result
Shangela & Gleb	45 (9, 9, 9, 9, 9)	Tango	"Hollywood"	Safe
Trevor & Emma	42 (9, 8, 8, 8, 9)	Foxtrot	"Come Fly with Me"	Bottom two
Gabby & Val	46 (9, 9, 9, 9, 10)	Rumba	"Home"	Safe
Vinny & Koko	36 (7, 7, 8, 7, 7)	Cha-cha-cha	"Save the Last Dance for Me"	Safe
Jordin & Brandon	43 (9, 8, 9, 8, 9)	Foxtrot	"You Make Me Feel So Young"	Safe
Charli & Mark	50 (10, 10, 10, 10, 10)	Foxtrot	"Fever"	Safe
Heidi & Artem	46 (9, 9, 10, 9, 9)	Samba	"It Had Better Be Tonight (Meglio stasera)"	Safe
Wayne & Witney	44 (8, 9, 10, 8, 9)	Quickstep	"I Get a Kick Out of You"	Safe
Jessie & Alan	41 (8, 8, 9, 8, 8)	Salsa	"Come Dance with Me"	Eliminated
Daniel & Britt	43 (9, 8, 9, 8, 9)	Foxtrot	"Feeling Good"	Safe

Judges' votes to save

- Bruno: Trevor & Emma
- Derek: Jessie & Alan
- Carrie Ann: Trevor & Emma
- Len: Trevor & Emma (Since the other judges were not unanimous, Len, as head judge, made the final decision to save Trevor & Emma.)

=== Week 7: Halloween Night ===
Each couple performed one unlearned dance and participated in a team dance to Halloween themes. Couples are listed in the order they performed.

Val Chmerkovskiy tested positive for COVID-19, so Gabby Windey performed instead with Alan Bersten.

Dancing with the Stars (season 31) - Week 7
Couple	Scores	Dance	Music	Result
Jordin & Brandon	36 (9, 9, 9, 9)	Tango	"Oogie Boogie's Song" — Ed Ivory & Ken Page	Eliminated
Charli & Mark	39 (9, 10, 10, 10)	Argentine tango	"Tanguera" — Fabio Hager Sexteto	Safe
Daniel & Britt	34 (8, 8, 9, 9)	Paso doble	"Bury a Friend" — Billie Eilish	Safe
Shangela & Gleb	40 (10, 10, 10, 10)	Jazz	"Look What You Made Me Do" — Taylor Swift	Safe
Vinny & Koko	30 (7, 7, 8, 8)	Paso doble	"Get Ghost" — Mark Ronson, Passion Pit & ASAP Ferg	Safe
Heidi & Artem	37 (9, 9, 10, 9)	Tango	"I Wanna Be Your Slave" — Måneskin	Bottom two
Gabby & Alan	38 (10, 9, 9, 10)	Argentine tango	"Shivers" — District 78, feat. Mikayla Lynn	Safe
Wayne & Witney	37 (9, 9, 9, 10)	Contemporary	"Halloween Theme" — District 78	Safe
Trevor & Emma	39 (10, 9, 10, 10)	Contemporary	"Ghost (Acoustic)" — Justin Bieber	Safe
Gabby & Alan Heidi & Artem Jordin & Brandon Shangela & Gleb Vinny & Koko	33 (8, 8, 9, 8)	Freestyle (Team Wicked)	"The Witches Are Back" — Bette Midler, Sarah Jessica Parker & Kathy Najimy	
Charli & Mark Daniel & Britt Trevor & Emma Wayne & Witney	39 (10, 9, 10, 10)	Freestyle (Team Scream)	"Heads Will Roll" — Yeah Yeah Yeahs	

Judges' votes to save

- Carrie Ann: Heidi & Artem
- Derek: Jordin & Brandon
- Bruno: Jordin & Brandon
- Len: Heidi & Artem (Since the other judges were not unanimous, Len, as head judge, made the final decision to save Heidi & Artem.)

=== Week 8: '90s Night ===
Each couple performed one unlearned dance and a dance relay to songs from the 1990s. Couples are listed in the order they performed. Two couples were sent home at the end of the night in a double elimination.

Vanilla Ice, En Vogue, Salt-N-Pepa, and Kid 'n Play performed their respective songs during the dance relays.

Dancing with the Stars (season 31) - Week 8
Couple	Scores	Dance	Music	Result
Trevor & Emma	34 (8, 9, 8, 9)	Salsa	"Barbie Girl" — Aqua	Bottom three
Shangela & Gleb	37 (10, 9, 9, 9)	Samba	"Spice Up Your Life" — Spice Girls	Safe
Wayne & Witney	40 (10, 10, 10, 10)	Salsa	"Motownphilly" — Boyz II Men	Safe
Daniel & Britt	39 (10, 9, 10, 10)	Jazz	"Enjoy the Silence" — Depeche Mode	Safe
Heidi & Artem	35 (9, 8, 9, 9)	Contemporary	"Ironic" — Alanis Morissette	Eliminated immediately
Gabby & Val	40 (10, 10, 10, 10)	Samba	"Livin' La Vida Loca" — Ricky Martin	Safe
Vinny & Koko	29 (8, 7, 7, 7)	Tango	"What Is Love" — Haddaway	Eliminated by judges' votes
Charli & Mark	40 (10, 10, 10, 10)	Tango	"Song 2" — Blur	Safe
Shangela & Gleb	5 (Note: Shangela & Gleb received five points from Len.)	Cha-cha-cha; Relay	"Ice Ice Baby" — Vanilla Ice	
Daniel & Britt	0	Cha-cha-cha; Relay	"Ice Ice Baby" — Vanilla Ice	
Vinny & Koko	0	Samba; Relay	"My Lovin' (You're Never Gonna Get It)" — En Vogue	
Trevor & Emma	5 (Note: Trevor & Emma received five points from Carrie Ann.)	Samba; Relay	"My Lovin' (You're Never Gonna Get It)" — En Vogue	
Heidi & Artem	0	Samba; Relay	"Shoop" — Salt-N-Pepa	
Wayne & Witney	5 (Note: Wayne & Witney received five points from Bruno.)	Samba; Relay	"Shoop" — Salt-N-Pepa	
Charli & Mark	5 (Note: Charli & Mark received five points from Derek.)	Salsa; Relay	"Ain't Gonna Hurt Nobody" — Kid 'n Play	
Gabby & Val	0	Salsa; Relay	"Ain't Gonna Hurt Nobody" — Kid 'n Play	

Notes

Judges' votes to save

- Derek: Trevor & Emma
- Bruno: Trevor & Emma
- Carrie Ann: Trevor & Emma
- Len: Did not vote, but would have voted to save Trevor & Emma

=== Week 9: Semifinals ===
Each couple performed one unlearned ballroom dance and one unlearned Latin dance. Couples are listed in the order they performed. Two couples were eliminated at the end of the night in a double elimination.

Len Goodman announced that he would be retiring from the series at the end of this season.

Dancing with the Stars (season 31) - Week 9
Couple	Scores	Dance	Music	Result
Wayne & Witney	36 (9, 9, 9, 9)	Paso doble	"Beggin'" — Måneskin	Safe
Wayne & Witney	37 (10, 9, 9, 9)	Viennese waltz	"It's a Man's Man's Man's World" — James Brown	Safe
Daniel & Britt	35 (9, 8, 9, 9)	Viennese waltz	"Surprise Yourself" — Jack Garratt	Eliminated by judges' votes
Daniel & Britt	34 (9, 8, 9, 8)	Samba	"Light It Up (Remix)" — Major Lazer, feat. Nyla & Fuse ODG	Eliminated by judges' votes
Shangela & Gleb	36 (9, 9, 9, 9)	Paso doble	"The Edge of Glory" — Lady Gaga	Bottom three
Shangela & Gleb	37 (10, 9, 9, 9)	Viennese waltz	"I Have Nothing" — Whitney Houston	Bottom three
Charli & Mark	40 (10, 10, 10, 10)	Viennese waltz	"Glimpse of Us" —Joji	Safe
Charli & Mark	40 (10, 10, 10, 10)	Paso doble	"España cañí" — Pascual Marquina	Safe
Trevor & Emma	32 (8, 8, 8, 8)	Cha-cha-cha	"Satisfied" — Galantis, feat. MAX	Eliminated immediately
Trevor & Emma	33 (9, 8, 8, 8)	Viennese waltz	"Count On Me" — Judah Kelly	Eliminated immediately
Gabby & Val	40 (10, 10, 10, 10)	Waltz	"I'm Kissing You" — Des'ree	Safe
Gabby & Val	40 (10, 10, 10, 10)	Paso doble	"Malagueña" — Brian Setzer	Safe

Judges' votes to save

- Carrie Ann: Shangela & Gleb
- Derek: Shangela & Gleb
- Bruno: Shangela & Gleb
- Len: Did not vote, but would have voted to save Shangela & Gleb

=== Week 10: Finale ===
Each couple performed one redemption dance coached by one of the judges, and their freestyle routine. Couples are listed in the order they performed.

Dancing with the Stars (season 31) - Week 10
Couple	Judge	Scores	Dance	Music	Result
Shangela & Gleb	Bruno Tonioli	36 (9, 9, 9, 9)	Quickstep	"Queen Bee" — Rochelle Diamante	Fourth place
Shangela & Gleb	Bruno Tonioli	40 (10, 10, 10, 10)	Freestyle	"Survivor" — Destiny's Child & "Call Me Mother" — RuPaul	Fourth place
Wayne & Witney	Len Goodman	36 (9, 9, 9, 9)	Quickstep	"(Your Love Keeps Lifting Me) Higher and Higher" — Jackie Wilson	Third place
Wayne & Witney	Len Goodman	40 (10, 10, 10, 10)	Freestyle	"Get Up" — Ciara, feat. Chamillionaire & "24K Magic" —Bruno Mars	Third place
Charli & Mark	Carrie Ann Inaba	40 (10, 10, 10, 10)	Jive	"Grown" — Little Mix	Winners
Charli & Mark	Carrie Ann Inaba	40 (10, 10, 10, 10)	Freestyle	"Us Again" — Pinar Toprak	Winners
Gabby & Val	Derek Hough	40 (10, 10, 10, 10)	Cha-cha-cha	"I Like It (Like That)" — Pete Rodriguez	Runners-up
Gabby & Val	Derek Hough	40 (10, 10, 10, 10)	Freestyle	"Cell Block Tango" — from Chicago	Runners-up

== Dance chart ==
The couples performed the following each week:

- Weeks 1—4: One unlearned dance
- Week 5 (Night 1): One unlearned dance
- Week 5 (Night 2): One unlearned dance & dance marathon
- Week 6: One unlearned dance
- Week 7: One unlearned dance & team dance
- Week 8: One unlearned dance & dance relay
- Week 9 (Semifinals): One unlearned ballroom dance & one unlearned Latin dance
- Week 10 (Finale): Redemption dance & freestyle

Color key:

Performed in exhibition

Dancing with the Stars (season 31) - Dance chart
Couple	Week															
Couple	1	2	3	4	5			6	7		8		9		10	
Couple	1	2	3	4	Night 1	Night 2		6	7		8		9		10	
Charli & Mark	Cha-cha-cha	Quickstep	Rumba	Jazz	Contemp.	Jive	Hustle & Lindy Hop; Marathon	Foxtrot	Argentine tango	Team Freestyle	Tango	Salsa	Viennese waltz	Paso doble	Jive	Freestyle
Gabby & Val	Jive	Viennese waltz	Cha-cha-cha	Quickstep	Foxtrot	Tango	Hustle & Lindy Hop; Marathon	Rumba	Argentine tango	Team Freestyle	Samba	Salsa	Waltz	Paso doble	Cha-cha-cha	Freestyle
Wayne & Witney	Cha-cha-cha	Jive	Tango	Jazz	Foxtrot	Samba	Hustle & Lindy Hop; Marathon	Quickstep	Contemp.	Team Freestyle	Salsa	Samba	Paso doble	Viennese waltz	Quickstep	Freestyle
Shangela & Gleb	Salsa	Quickstep	Rumba	Charleston	Foxtrot	Cha-cha-cha	Hustle & Lindy Hop; Marathon	Tango	Jazz	Team Freestyle	Samba	Cha-cha-cha	Paso doble	Viennese waltz	Quickstep	Freestyle
Daniel & Britt	Tango	Jive	Rumba	Quickstep	Contemp.	Cha-cha-cha	Hustle & Lindy Hop; Marathon	Foxtrot	Paso doble	Team Freestyle	Jazz	Cha-cha-cha	Viennese waltz	Samba		
Trevor & Emma	Quickstep	Rumba	Tango	Samba	Jazz	Jive	Hustle & Lindy Hop; Marathon	Foxtrot	Contemp.	Team Freestyle	Salsa	Samba	Cha-cha-cha	Viennese waltz		
Vinny & Koko	Salsa	Quickstep	Rumba	Samba	Jazz	Viennese waltz	Hustle & Lindy Hop; Marathon	Cha-cha-cha	Paso doble	Team Freestyle	Tango	Samba				
Heidi & Artem	Cha-cha-cha	Foxtrot	Argentine tango	Viennese waltz	Rumba	Jazz	Hustle & Lindy Hop; Marathon	Samba	Tango	Team; Freestyle	Contemp.	Samba				
Jordin & Brandon	Cha-cha-cha	Quickstep	Rumba	Jazz	Salsa	Contemp.	Hustle & Lindy Hop; Marathon	Foxtrot	Tango	Team Freestyle						
Jessie & Alan	Cha-cha-cha	Foxtrot	Rumba	Jive	Tango	Viennese waltz	Hustle & Lindy Hop; Marathon	Salsa								
Joseph & Daniella	Jive	Viennese waltz	Argentine tango	Charleston	Rumba	Cha-cha-cha	Hustle & Lindy Hop; Marathon									
Selma & Sasha	Viennese waltz	Jive	Rumba	Quickstep	Waltz										Contemporary	
Sam & Cheryl	Foxtrot	Viennese waltz	Samba	Paso doble												
Cheryl & Louis	Cha-cha-cha	Tango	Rumba													
Teresa & Pasha	Tango	Jive														
Jason & Peta	Cha-cha-cha															
