= Dancing with the Stars (American TV series) season 29 =

Dancing with the Stars
- Season 29
- Promotional poster, featuring host Tyra Banks
- Hosted by: Tyra Banks
- Judges: Carrie Ann Inaba; Bruno Tonioli; Derek Hough
- Celebrity winner: Kaitlyn Bristowe
- Professional winner: Artem Chigvintsev
- No. of episodes: 11

Release
- Original network: ABC
- Original release: September 14 – November 23, 2020

Season chronology
- ← Previous; Season 28 Next → Season 30

The twenty-ninth season of the American reality competition series Dancing with the Stars premiered on September 14, 2020 on ABC and streamed on Hulu. Due to the COVID-19 pandemic, the season was filmed without a live studio audience.

On November 23, The Bachelorette star Kaitlyn Bristowe and Artem Chigvintsev were crowned the champions, while Catfish host Nev Schulman and Jenna Johnson finished in second place, rapper and singer Nelly and Daniella Karagach finished in third place, and actress Justina Machado and Sasha Farber finished in fourth.

== Cast ==
=== Couples ===
This season featured fifteen celebrity contestants. Continuing from last season, the couples were not announced in advance and were instead revealed on the season premiere. During The Bachelor: Greatest Seasons - Ever!, season 11's Bachelorette, Kaitlyn Bristowe, was announced as the first celebrity participant. On August 24, 2020, it was reported that AJ McLean, member of Backstreet Boys, would be a celebrity participant as well; McLean was later officially revealed on August 27. On August 29, 2020, it was reported that Anne Heche, Jesse Metcalfe, and Vernon Davis would be celebrity participants in the season. The other celebrity participants were revealed on Good Morning America on September 2.

Fourteen of the professional dancers was announced on Good Morning America on August 18, 2020, with the fifteenth professional announced on August 24. Ten professionals from the previous season returned, along with Sharna Burgess, Artem Chigvintsev, and Keo Motsepe, all of whom last competed in season 27. Two new pros were added: Daniella Karagach, previously a featured dancer, and Britt Stewart, a former troupe member, who is the first black female to become a pro.

Celebrity	Notability	Professional partner	Status	Ref.
Charles Oakley	NBA power forward	Emma Slater	Eliminated 1st on September 22, 2020	
Carole Baskin	Tiger King cast member & animal activist	Pasha Pashkov	Eliminated 2nd on September 28, 2020	
Anne Heche	Film & television actress	Keo Motsepe	Eliminated 3rd on October 5, 2020	
Jesse Metcalfe	Film & television actor	Sharna Burgess	Eliminated 4th on October 12, 2020	
Vernon Davis	NFL tight end	Peta Murgatroyd	Eliminated 5th on October 19, 2020	
Monica Aldama	Cheer cast member & coach	Valentin Chmerkovskiy	Eliminated 6th on October 26, 2020	
Jeannie Mai	Television host & stylist	Brandon Armstrong	Withdrew on November 2, 2020	
Chrishell Stause	Actress & Selling Sunset cast member	Gleb Savchenko	Eliminated 7th on November 2, 2020	
AJ McLean	Backstreet Boys singer	Cheryl Burke	Eliminated 8th on November 9, 2020	
Johnny Weir	Olympic figure skater	Britt Stewart	Eliminated 9th on November 16, 2020	
Skai Jackson	Disney Channel actress	Alan Bersten	Eliminated 10th on November 16, 2020	
Justina Machado	Film & television actress	Sasha Farber	Fourth place on November 23, 2020	
Nelly	Rapper & singer	Daniella Karagach	Third place on November 23, 2020	
Nev Schulman	Catfish host & producer	Jenna Johnson	Runners-up on November 23, 2020	
Kaitlyn Bristowe	The Bachelorette star	Artem Chigvintsev	Winners on November 23, 2020	

=== Hosts and judges ===
On July 13, 2020, it was announced that Tom Bergeron and Erin Andrews would not return as hosts. The next day, it was announced that Tyra Banks was hired as the new host and would also serve as an executive producer. Carrie Ann Inaba and Bruno Tonioli returned as judges for the season.

On September 8, 2020, it was announced that Derek Hough, who appeared as a professional partner in 17 of the show's 29 seasons, would return to the show to fill in for Len Goodman, due to Goodman being unable to travel with COVID-19 pandemic travel restrictions. Goodman still appeared in periodic pre-recorded video segments.

== Episodes ==
No. overall	No. in season	Title	Rating (18–49)	Original release date	U.S. viewers (millions)
449	1	"First Dances"	1.34	September 14, 2020	8.12
450	2	"First Elimination"	1.08	September 22, 2020	6.09
451	3	"Disney Night"	1.10	September 28, 2020	6.87
452	4	"Top 13"	0.89	October 5, 2020	5.84
453	5	"'80s Night"	0.91	October 12, 2020	6.26
454	6	"Top 11"	0.83	October 19, 2020	5.75
455	7	"Villains Night"	0.81	October 26, 2020	5.48
456	8	"Double Elimination Night"	0.80	November 2, 2020	5.55
457	9	"Icons Night"	0.89	November 9, 2020	5.97
458	10	"Semifinals"	0.83	November 16, 2020	5.75
459	11	"Finale"	0.99	November 23, 2020	6.41

== Scoring chart ==
The highest score each week is indicated in bold green with a dagger (†), while the lowest score each week is indicated in italicized red with a double-dagger (‡).

Color key:

Winners
Runners-up
Third place
Fourth place
Bottom two or three
Withdrew from competition
Eliminated

Dancing with the Stars (season 29) - Weekly scores
Couple	Pl.	Week											
Couple	Pl.	1	2	1+2	3	4	5	6	7	8	9	10	11
Kaitlyn & Artem	1st	20	**22**†	**42**†	23	25	27	**27**†	24	25+3=28	**30**†	30+30=**60**†	30+30=**60**† (Note: This couple finished in first place.)
Nev & Jenna	2nd	20	21	41	**24**†	24	26	26	**30**†	27+3=**30**†	27+2=29	30+30=**60**†	30+30=**60**† (Note: This couple finished in second place.)
Nelly & Daniella	3rd	16	18	34	18	21‡	24	24	27	21+2=23‡	24‡	26+30=56‡	27+30=57‡ (Note: This couple finished in third place.)
Justina & Sasha	4th	**21**†	21	**42**†	19	24	24	**27**†	26	27+2=29	24+2=26	28+30=58 (Note: This couple was in the bottom two or three, but was not eliminated.)	30+30=**60**† (Note: This couple finished in fourth place.)
Skai & Alan	5th	**21**†	15‡	36	18	**28**†	24	18‡	27	25+2=27	27+2=29	27+30=57 (Note: This couple was eliminated.)	
Johnny & Britt	6th	18	18	36	**24**†	24	**29**†	22	27	27+3=**30**†	**30**†	27+30=57	
AJ & Cheryl	7th	18	19	37	21	24	24	**27**†	26	24+3=27	23+2=25		
Chrishell & Gleb	8th	13	18	31	22	22	19‡	24	26	24+2=26			
Jeannie & Brandon	9th	18	18	36	22	21‡	24	25	25	(Note: This couple withdrew from the competition.)			
Monica & Val	10th	19	16	35	21	24	26	**27**†	22‡				
Vernon & Peta	11th	17	18	35	22	22	21	21					
Jesse & Sharna	12th	18	20	38	20	21‡	19‡						
Anne & Keo	13th	18	18	36	15	21‡							
Carole & Pasha	14th	11‡	16	27‡	12‡								
Charles & Emma	15th	12	15‡	27‡									

== Weekly scores ==
Individual judges' scores in the charts below (given in parentheses) are listed in this order from left to right: Carrie Ann Inaba, Derek Hough, Bruno Tonioli.

=== Week 1: First Dances ===
For the second time in the show's history, the official partnerships were revealed to the public during the live broadcast.

Couples are listed in the order they performed.

Couple	Scores	Dance	Music
AJ & Cheryl	18 (6, 6, 6)	Jive	"Blinding Lights" — The Weeknd
Chrishell & Gleb	13 (4, 5, 4)	Tango	"Raise Your Glass" — P!nk
Vernon & Peta	17 (5, 6, 6)	Foxtrot	"All of Me" — John Legend
Anne & Keo	18 (6, 6, 6)	Cha-cha-cha	"Don't Start Now" — Dua Lipa
Jeannie & Brandon	18 (6, 6, 6)	Salsa	"Tell It to My Heart" — Taylor Dayne
Jesse & Sharna	18 (6, 6, 6)	Quickstep	"Part-Time Lover" — Stevie Wonder
Skai & Alan	21 (7, 7, 7)	Tango	"Super Bass" — Nicki Minaj
Kaitlyn & Artem	20 (6, 7, 7)	Cha-cha-cha	"Stupid Love" — Lady Gaga
Nev & Jenna	20 (7, 7, 6)	Foxtrot	"The Way You Look Tonight" — Frank Sinatra
Johnny & Britt	18 (6, 6, 6)	Cha-cha-cha	"Buttons" — The Pussycat Dolls
Justina & Sasha	21 (7, 7, 7)	Cha-cha-cha	"Respect" — Aretha Franklin
Charles & Emma	12 (4, 4, 4)	Salsa	"In da Club" — 50 Cent
Monica & Val	19 (6, 7, 6)	Foxtrot	"My Wish" — Rascal Flatts
Nelly & Daniella	16 (5, 5, 6)	Salsa	"Ride wit Me" — Nelly
Carole & Pasha	11 (4, 4, 3)	Paso doble	"Eye of the Tiger" — Survivor

=== Week 2: First Elimination ===
The couples performed one unlearned dance, and are listed in the order they performed.

Couple	Scores	Dance	Music	Result
Nev & Jenna	21 (7, 7, 7)	Cha-cha-cha	"Dynamite" — BTS	Safe
Skai & Alan	15 (5, 5, 5)	Samba	"Miss Independent" — Ne-Yo	Safe
Johnny & Britt	18 (6, 6, 6)	Tango	"Poker Face" — Lady Gaga	Safe
Justina & Sasha	21 (7, 7, 7)	Foxtrot	"When You Believe" — Mariah Carey & Whitney Houston	Safe
Monica & Val	16 (5, 6, 5)	Jive	"Shake It Off" — Taylor Swift	Safe
AJ & Cheryl	19 (7, 6, 6)	Foxtrot	"Ain't That a Kick in the Head?" — Dean Martin	Safe
Anne & Keo	18 (6, 6, 6)	Foxtrot	"Counting Stars" — OneRepublic	Safe
Nelly & Daniella	18 (6, 6, 6)	Cha-cha-cha	"Let's Groove" — Earth, Wind & Fire	Safe
Chrishell & Gleb	18 (6, 6, 6)	Rumba	"This Is Me" — Keala Settle	Safe
Charles & Emma	15 (5, 5, 5)	Cha-cha-cha	"Never Too Much" — Luther Vandross	Eliminated
Jesse & Sharna	20 (7, 7, 6)	Foxtrot	"Dreams" — Fleetwood Mac	Safe
Jeannie & Brandon	18 (6, 6, 6)	Cha-cha-cha	"Roses" — Saint Jhn	Safe
Carole & Pasha	16 (6, 5, 5)	Viennese waltz	"What's New Pussycat?" — Tom Jones	Bottom two
Vernon & Peta	18 (6, 6, 6)	Paso doble	"We Found Love" — Rihanna, feat. Calvin Harris	Safe
Kaitlyn & Artem	22 (7, 8, 7)	Foxtrot	"I Hope You Dance" — Lee Ann Womack, feat. Sons of the Desert	Safe

Judges' votes to save

- Carrie Ann: Carole & Pasha
- Bruno: Charles & Emma
- Derek: Carole & Pasha

=== Week 3: Disney Night ===
The couples performed one unlearned dance to songs from Disney films. Couples are listed in the order they performed.

Couple	Scores	Dance	Music	Disney film	Result
Skai & Alan	18 (6, 6, 6)	Jive	"Almost There" — Anika Noni Rose	The Princess and the Frog	Safe
Monica & Val	21 (7, 7, 7)	Viennese waltz	"Part of Your World" — Ray Chew	The Little Mermaid	Safe
Justina & Sasha	19 (7, 6, 6)	Charleston	"Supercalifragilisticexpialidocious" — Julie Andrews & Dick Van Dyke	Mary Poppins	Safe
AJ & Cheryl	21 (7, 7, 7)	Quickstep	"Prince Ali" — Robin Williams	Aladdin	Safe
Anne & Keo	15 (5, 5, 5)	Quickstep	"Zero to Hero" — Ariana Grande	Hercules	Bottom two
Jeannie & Brandon	22 (7, 7, 8)	Viennese waltz	"Married Life" — Michael Giacchino	Up	Safe
Nelly & Daniella	18 (6, 6, 6)	Foxtrot	"It's All Right" — Jon Batiste	Soul	Safe
Carole & Pasha	12 (5, 4, 3)	Samba	"Circle of Life" — Carmen Twillie & Lebo M	The Lion King	Eliminated
Kaitlyn & Artem	23 (8, 7, 8)	Rumba	"How Far I'll Go" — Auliʻi Cravalho	Moana	Safe
Vernon & Peta	22 (8, 7, 7)	Quickstep	"Be Our Guest" — Jerry Orbach & Angela Lansbury	Beauty and the Beast	Safe
Nev & Jenna	24 (8, 8, 8)	Argentine tango	"Angelica" — Rodrigo y Gabriela	Pirates of the Caribbean: On Stranger Tides	Safe
Johnny & Britt	24 (8, 8, 8)	Rumba	"Reflection" — Christina Aguilera	Mulan	Safe
Jesse & Sharna	20 (7, 6, 7)	Jive	"King of New York" — from Newsies	Newsies	Safe
Chrishell & Gleb	22 (7, 7, 8)	Waltz	"A Dream Is a Wish Your Heart Makes" — Jessie Ware	Cinderella	Safe

Judges' votes to save

- Derek: Anne & Keo
- Bruno: Anne & Keo
- Carrie Ann: Did not vote, but would have voted to save Anne & Keo

=== Week 4: Top 13 ===
The couples performed one unlearned dance. Couples are listed in the order they performed.

Couple	Scores	Dance	Music	Result
Nelly & Daniella	21 (7, 7, 7)	Paso doble	"All I Do Is Win" — DJ Khaled, feat. T-Pain, Ludacris, Rick Ross & Snoop Dogg	Safe
Chrishell & Gleb	22 (7, 8, 7)	Foxtrot	"Adore You" — Harry Styles	Safe
Monica & Val	24 (8, 8, 8)	Samba	"Party in the U.S.A." — Miley Cyrus	Bottom two
Anne & Keo	21 (7, 7, 7)	Paso doble	"Rise" — Katy Perry	Eliminated
Nev & Jenna	24 (8, 8, 8)	Rumba	"Because You Loved Me" — Celine Dion	Safe
Justina & Sasha	24 (8, 8, 8)	Salsa	"Que Viva La Vida" — Wisin	Safe
Kaitlyn & Artem	25 (9, 8, 8)	Viennese waltz	"Beautiful Crazy" — Luke Combs	Safe
Johnny & Britt	24 (8, 8, 8)	Jive	"Crocodile Rock" — Elton John	Safe
Jeannie & Brandon	21 (7, 7, 7)	Tango	"Seven Nation Army" — The White Stripes	Safe
Vernon & Peta	22 (8, 7, 7)	Rumba	"Let's Stay Together" — Al Green	Safe
Jesse & Sharna	21 (7, 7, 7)	Cha-cha-cha	"Smooth" — Santana, feat. Rob Thomas	Safe
Skai & Alan	28 (10, 9, 9)	Foxtrot	"Ordinary People" — John Legend	Safe
AJ & Cheryl	24 (8, 8, 8)	Cha-cha-cha	"Larger Than Life" — Backstreet Boys	Safe

Judges' votes to save

- Carrie Ann: Monica & Val
- Derek: Monica & Val
- Bruno: Did not vote, but would have voted to save Monica & Val

=== Week 5: '80s Night ===
The couples performed one unlearned dance to a song released in the 1980s. Couples are listed in the order they performed.

Couple	Scores	Dance	Music	Result
Justina & Sasha	24 (8, 8, 8)	Jazz	"Maniac" — Michael Sembello	Safe
Jesse & Sharna	19 (7, 6, 6)	Tango	"Everybody Wants to Rule the World" — Tears for Fears	Eliminated
Chrishell & Gleb	19 (6, 6, 7)	Cha-cha-cha	"You Got It (The Right Stuff)" — New Kids on the Block	Safe
Jeannie & Brandon	24 (8, 8, 8)	Jazz	"Like a Virgin" — Madonna	Safe
Monica & Val	26 (9, 9, 8)	Tango	"Tainted Love" — Soft Cell	Safe
AJ & Cheryl	24 (8, 8, 8)	Waltz	"Open Arms" — Journey	Safe
Skai & Alan	24 (8, 8, 8)	Jazz	"The Power of Love" — Huey Lewis and the News	Safe
Vernon & Peta	21 (7, 7, 7)	Tango	"Livin' on a Prayer" — Bon Jovi	Bottom two
Kaitlyn & Artem	27 (9, 9, 9)	Tango	"I Think We're Alone Now" — Tiffany	Safe
Nelly & Daniella	24 (8, 8, 8)	Samba	"Rhythm of the Night" — DeBarge	Safe
Johnny & Britt	29 (10, 10, 9)	Contemporary	"Total Eclipse of the Heart" — Bonnie Tyler	Safe
Nev & Jenna	26 (8, 9, 9)	Quickstep	"Take On Me" — A-ha	Safe

Judges' votes to save

- Bruno: Vernon & Peta
- Carrie Ann: Vernon & Peta
- Derek: Did not vote, but would have voted to save Vernon & Peta

=== Week 6: Top 11 ===
The couples performed one unlearned dance. Couples are listed in the order they performed.

Couple	Scores	Dance	Music	Result
Johnny & Britt	22 (7, 8, 7)	Salsa	"On the Floor" — Jennifer Lopez, feat. Pitbull	Bottom two
Nev & Jenna	26 (9, 9, 8)	Jazz	"Good Vibrations" — Marky Mark and the Funky Bunch	Safe
Monica & Val	27 (9, 9, 9)	Rumba	"Have I Told You Lately" — Rod Stewart	Safe
Skai & Alan	18 (6, 6, 6)	Cha-cha-cha	"Say So" — Doja Cat, feat. Nicki Minaj	Safe
Vernon & Peta	21 (7, 7, 7)	Cha-cha-cha	"Celebration" — Kool & The Gang	Eliminated
Nelly & Daniella	24 (8, 8, 8)	Viennese waltz	"Humble and Kind" — Tim McGraw	Safe
Jeannie & Brandon	25 (8, 8, 9)	Rumba	"You Gotta Be" — Des'ree	Safe
AJ & Cheryl	27 (9, 9, 9)	Samba	"Mi Gente" — J Balvin & Willy William	Safe
Chrishell & Gleb	24 (8, 8, 8)	Contemporary	"Stars" — Grace Potter & The Nocturnals	Safe
Kaitlyn & Artem	27 (9, 9, 9)	Samba	"Sorry" — Justin Bieber	Safe
Justina & Sasha	27 (9, 9, 9)	Viennese waltz	"She's Always a Woman" — Billy Joel	Safe

Judges' votes to save

- Derek: Johnny & Britt
- Carrie Ann: Vernon & Peta
- Bruno: Johnny & Britt

=== Week 7: Villains Night ===
The couples performed one unlearned dance dressed as villains from a movie or television show. Couples are listed in the order they performed.

Couple	Scores	Dance	Villain	Music	Result
Jeannie & Brandon	25 (8, 9, 8)	Paso doble	Hannibal Lecter	"Maneater" — Nelly Furtado	Bottom two
Johnny & Britt	27 (9, 9, 9)	Viennese waltz	Dracula	"Creep" — Vincint	Safe
Chrishell & Gleb	26 (9, 9, 8)	Paso doble	Maleficent	"In the Air Tonight" — Helmut Vonlichten	Safe
Monica & Val	22 (7, 8, 7)	Jazz	Nurse Ratched	"Fever" — Beyoncé	Eliminated
AJ & Cheryl	26 (9, 8, 9)	Tango	Norman Bates	"Psycho" — Intermezzo Orchestra	Safe
Nelly & Daniella	27 (9, 9, 9)	Argentine tango	Freddy Krueger	"Can't Feel My Face" — The Weeknd	Safe
Justina & Sasha	26 (9, 9, 8)	Tango	Carrie White	"Take Me to Church" — MILCK	Safe
Nev & Jenna	30 (10, 10, 10)	Paso doble	Black Swan	"Swan Lake Remix" — District 78	Safe
Skai & Alan	27 (9, 9, 9)	Argentine tango	Tiffany Valentine	"Everything I Wanted" — Billie Eilish	Safe
Kaitlyn & Artem	24 (7, 9, 8)	Paso doble	Cruella de Vil	"Disturbia" — Rihanna	Safe

Judges' votes to save

- Bruno: Jeannie & Brandon
- Derek: Monica & Val
- Carrie Ann: Jeannie & Brandon

=== Week 8: Double Elimination Night ===
The couples performed one unlearned dance and a dance relay with two other couples. Hours before the episode aired, Jeannie Mai had to withdraw from the competition after being hospitalized for epiglottitis. As a result, the originally planned double elimination did not take place; only one other couple was eliminated. Couples are listed in the order they performed.

Couple	Scores	Dance	Music	Result
Kaitlyn & Artem	25 (8, 9, 8)	Jive	"Don't Stop Me Now" — Queen	Safe
Nev & Jenna	27 (9, 9, 9)	Viennese waltz	"Stuck with U" — Ariana Grande & Justin Bieber	Safe
Justina & Sasha	27 (9, 9, 9)	Samba	"Magalenha" — Sérgio Mendes, feat. Carlinhos Brown	Safe
Nelly & Daniella	21 (7, 7, 7)	Rumba	"Nobody Knows" — The Tony Rich Project	Safe
Chrishell & Gleb	24 (8, 8, 8)	Viennese waltz	"Love on the Brain" — Rihanna	Eliminated
Skai & Alan	25 (8, 9, 8)	Salsa	"Work It" — Missy Elliott	Bottom two
Johnny & Britt	27 (9, 9, 9)	Foxtrot	"Wonder" — Shawn Mendes	Safe
AJ & Cheryl	24 (8, 8, 8)	Rumba	"Way Down We Go" — Kaleo	Safe
Nev & Jenna	3	Cha-cha-cha; Relay	"Rain on Me" — Lady Gaga & Ariana Grande	
Chrishell & Gleb	2	Cha-cha-cha; Relay	"Rain on Me" — Lady Gaga & Ariana Grande	
Nelly & Daniella	2	Cha-cha-cha; Relay	"Rain on Me" — Lady Gaga & Ariana Grande	
Justina & Sasha	2	Viennese waltz Relay	"I Have Nothing" — Whitney Houston	
Johnny & Britt	3	Viennese waltz Relay	"I Have Nothing" — Whitney Houston	
AJ & Cheryl	3	Samba Relay	"Levitating" — Dua Lipa, feat. DaBaby	
Kaitlyn & Artem	3	Samba Relay	"Levitating" — Dua Lipa, feat. DaBaby	
Skai & Alan	2	Samba Relay	"Levitating" — Dua Lipa, feat. DaBaby	

Judges' votes to save

- Carrie Ann: Skai & Alan
- Bruno: Skai & Alan
- Derek: Did not vote, but would have voted to save Skai & Alan

=== Week 9: Icons Night ===
The couples performed one unlearned dance dressed as an icon and participated in paired dance-offs for extra points. Nev & Jenna were immune from the dance-off as a result of their week 8 performance and a tie-breaker of having the highest total season score. Couples are listed in the order they performed.

Couple	Scores	Dance	Icon	Music	Result
Justina & Sasha	24 (8, 8, 8)	Rumba	Madonna	"Crazy for You" — Madonna	Safe
Nelly & Daniella	24 (8, 8, 8)	Jazz	Tupac Shakur	"California Love" — Tupac, feat. Dr. Dre & Roger Troutman	Safe
AJ & Cheryl	23 (7, 8, 8)	Viennese waltz	Freddie Mercury	"Somebody to Love" — Queen	Eliminated
Kaitlyn & Artem	30 (10, 10, 10)	Argentine tango	Britney Spears	"Toxic" — Britney Spears	Safe
Johnny & Britt	30 (10, 10, 10)	Quickstep	Amy Winehouse	"Valerie" — Amy Winehouse, feat. Mark Ronson	Bottom two
Skai & Alan	27 (9, 9, 9)	Paso doble	Janet Jackson	"If" — Janet Jackson	Safe
Nev & Jenna	27 (9, 9, 9)	Jive	Elton John	"Saturday Night's Alright for Fighting" — Elton John	Safe

Dance-offs
Couple	Dance	Music	Result
Justina & Sasha	Cha-cha-cha	"Telephone" — Lady Gaga, feat. Beyoncé	Winners
Kaitlyn & Artem	Cha-cha-cha	"Telephone" — Lady Gaga, feat. Beyoncé	Losers
Skai & Alan	Salsa	"The Cup of Life" — Ricky Martin	Winners
Nelly & Daniella	Salsa	"The Cup of Life" — Ricky Martin	Losers
AJ & Cheryl	Jive	"Wake Me Up Before You Go-Go" — Wham!	Winners
Johnny & Britt	Jive	"Wake Me Up Before You Go-Go" — Wham!	Losers

Judges' votes to save

- Bruno: Johnny & Britt
- Derek: AJ & Cheryl
- Carrie Ann: Johnny & Britt

=== Week 10: Semifinals ===
During the first round, the couples performed a redemption dance to a new song that was coached by one of the three judges. In the second round, they performed one unlearned dance. Two couples were sent home at the end of the night in a double elimination. Couples are listed in the order they performed.

Couple	Judge	Scores	Dance	Music	Result
Skai & Alan	Bruno Tonioli	27 (9, 9, 9)	Cha-cha-cha	"Move Your Feet" — Junior Senior	Eliminated by judges' votes
Skai & Alan	Bruno Tonioli	30 (10, 10, 10)	Viennese waltz	"Lonely" — Noah Cyrus	Eliminated by judges' votes
Justina & Sasha	Derek Hough	28 (9, 10, 9)	Tango	"El Tango de Roxanne" — from Moulin Rouge!	Bottom three
Justina & Sasha	Derek Hough	30 (10, 10, 10)	Contemporary	"Holding Out for a Hero" — Ella Mae Bowen & Bonnie Tyler	Bottom three
Johnny & Britt	Carrie Ann Inaba	27 (9, 9, 9)	Salsa	"X" — Jonas Brothers & Karol G	Eliminated immediately
Johnny & Britt	Carrie Ann Inaba	30 (10, 10, 10)	Jazz	"I Lived" — OneRepublic	Eliminated immediately
Nelly & Daniella	Bruno Tonioli	26 (9, 8, 9)	Paso doble	"Run Boy Run" — Woodkid	Safe
Nelly & Daniella	Bruno Tonioli	30 (10, 10, 10)	Jive	"Jump, Jive an' Wail" — The Brian Setzer Orchestra	Safe
Nev & Jenna	Derek Hough	30 (10, 10, 10)	Foxtrot	"Sign of the Times" — Harry Styles	Safe
Nev & Jenna	Derek Hough	30 (10, 10, 10)	Contemporary	"If the World Was Ending" — JP Saxe & Julia Michaels	Safe
Kaitlyn & Artem	Carrie Ann Inaba	30 (10, 10, 10)	Paso doble	"Hanuman" — Rodrigo y Gabriela	Safe
Kaitlyn & Artem	Carrie Ann Inaba	30 (10, 10, 10)	Contemporary	"Cowboy Take Me Away" — The Chicks	Safe

Judges' votes to save

- Derek: Justina & Sasha
- Carrie Ann: Justina & Sasha
- Bruno: Did not vote, but would have voted to save Justina & Sasha

=== Week 11: Finale ===
The couples performed their favorite dance of the season and their freestyle routine. Couples are listed in the order they performed.

Couple	Scores	Dance	Music	Result
Kaitlyn & Artem	30 (10, 10, 10)	Argentine tango	"Toxic" — Britney Spears	Winners
Kaitlyn & Artem	30 (10, 10, 10)	Freestyle	"Sparkling Diamonds" — Nicole Kidman	Winners
Nelly & Daniella	27 (9, 9, 9)	Samba	"Rhythm of the Night" — DeBarge	Third place
Nelly & Daniella	30 (10, 10, 10)	Freestyle	"Savage" — Megan Thee Stallion & "Hypnotize" — The Notorious B.I.G.	Third place
Nev & Jenna	30 (10, 10, 10)	Paso doble	"Swan Lake Remix" — District 78	Runners-up
Nev & Jenna	30 (10, 10, 10)	Freestyle	"Singin' In The Rain" — District 78	Runners-up
Justina & Sasha	30 (10, 10, 10)	Cha-cha-cha	"Respect" — Aretha Franklin	Fourth place
Justina & Sasha	30 (10, 10, 10)	Freestyle	"Let's Get Loud" — Jennifer Lopez & "Bamboleo" — Gipsy Kings	Fourth place

== Dance chart ==
The couples performed the following each week:

- Week 1: One unlearned dance
- Week 2: One unlearned dance
- Week 3: One unlearned dance
- Week 4: One unlearned dance
- Week 5: One unlearned dance
- Week 6: One unlearned dance
- Week 7: One unlearned dance
- Week 8: One unlearned dance & dance relay
- Week 9: One unlearned dance & dance-off
- Week 10 (Semifinals): One unlearned dance & redemption dance
- Week 11 (Finale): Favorite dance & freestyle

Dancing with the Stars (season 29) - Dance chart
Couple	Week														
Couple	1	2	3	4	5	6	7	8		9		10		11	
Kaitlyn & Artem	Cha-cha-cha	Foxtrot	Rumba	Viennese waltz	Tango	Samba	Paso doble	Jive	Samba	Argentine tango	Cha-cha-cha	Paso doble	Contemp.	Argentine tango	Freestyle
Nev & Jenna	Foxtrot	Cha-cha-cha	Argentine tango	Rumba	Quickstep	Jazz	Paso doble	Viennese waltz	Cha-cha-cha	Jive	Immunity	Foxtrot	Contemp.	Paso doble	Freestyle
Nelly & Daniella	Salsa	Cha-cha-cha	Foxtrot	Paso doble	Samba	Viennese waltz	Argentine tango	Rumba	Cha-cha-cha	Jazz	Salsa	Paso doble	Jive	Samba	Freestyle
Justina & Sasha	Cha-cha-cha	Foxtrot	Charleston	Salsa	Jazz	Viennese waltz	Tango	Samba	Viennese waltz	Rumba	Cha-cha-cha	Tango	Contemp.	Cha-cha-cha	Freestyle
Skai & Alan	Tango	Samba	Jive	Foxtrot	Jazz	Cha-cha-cha	Argentine tango	Salsa	Samba	Paso doble	Salsa	Cha-cha-cha	Viennese waltz		
Johnny & Britt	Cha-cha-cha	Tango	Rumba	Jive	Contemp.	Salsa	Viennese waltz	Foxtrot	Viennese waltz	Quickstep	Jive	Salsa	Jazz		
AJ & Cheryl	Jive	Foxtrot	Quickstep	Cha-cha-cha	Waltz	Samba	Tango	Rumba	Samba	Viennese waltz	Jive				
Chrishell & Gleb	Tango	Rumba	Waltz	Foxtrot	Cha-cha-cha	Contemp.	Paso doble	Viennese waltz	Cha-cha-cha						
Jeannie & Brandon	Salsa	Cha-cha-cha	Viennese waltz	Tango	Jazz	Rumba	Paso doble								
Monica & Val	Foxtrot	Jive	Viennese waltz	Samba	Tango	Rumba	Jazz								
Vernon & Peta	Foxtrot	Paso doble	Quickstep	Rumba	Tango	Cha-cha-cha									
Jesse & Sharna	Quickstep	Foxtrot	Jive	Cha-cha-cha	Tango										
Anne & Keo	Cha-cha-cha	Foxtrot	Quickstep	Paso doble											
Carole & Pasha	Paso doble	Viennese waltz	Samba												
Charles & Emma	Salsa	Cha-cha-cha													
