= Daniella Karagach =

American professional dancer (born 1992)

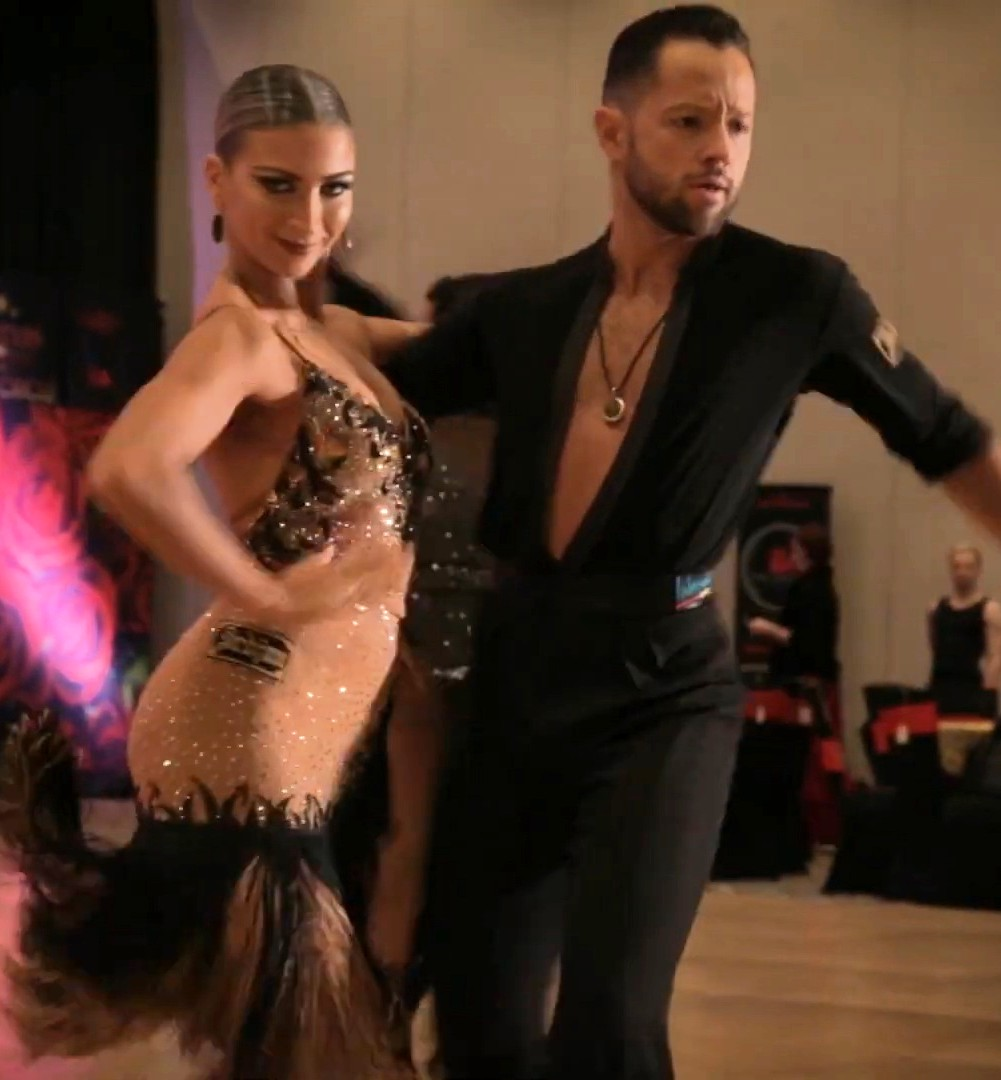
- Daniella Karagach (left) and Pasha Pashkov in 2019
- Born: Daniella Brittany Karagach; December 26, 1992 (age 33); Brooklyn, New York City, U.S.
- Other name: Daniella Karagach Pashkova
- Education: College of Staten Island
- Occupations: Dancer; choreographer
- Television: America's Ballroom Challenge; World of Dance; Dancing with the Stars
- Spouse: Pasha Pashkov (m. 2014)
- Children: 1

Daniella Brittany Karagach Pashkova (née Karagach; born December 26, 1992) is an American professional Latin and ballroom dancer and choreographer. She began her career in dancesport and rose to prominence as a contestant on the second season of the NBC competition series World of Dance with her husband, Pasha Pashkov.

Karagach continued her competitive dancing career by joining the ABC competition series Dancing with the Stars in September 2019. She won the thirtieth season with basketball player Iman Shumpert and received a nomination for the Primetime Emmy Award for Outstanding Choreography.

== Early life ==
Daniella Brittany Karagach was born on December 26, 1992, in Brooklyn, New York. Her parents, Mark Karagach and Regina Yvette Karagach (now Zurinam), are Moldovan immigrants; they divorced one year after her birth. Karagach was primarily raised as an only child by her mother in Forest Hills and Bath Beach; until her mother married her stepfather, Arie Zurinam, and she gained a stepsister, Ariana. She moved to South Beach, Staten Island when she grew older.

Karagach began taking ballet lessons at the age of three, and by age seven was taking Latin dance classes. She had trouble focusing in school and was diagnosed with attention deficit hyperactivity disorder (ADHD) when she was six years old. Her mother refused to give her prescribed medication due to her age and instead enrolled her in ballroom dance classes, which helped her focus and improve her academic performance. Despite her ADHD diagnosis, she was enrolled in honors and advanced placement programs, and went on to graduate from Franklin Delano Roosevelt High School. Karagach studied childhood education at the College of Staten Island.

== Career ==
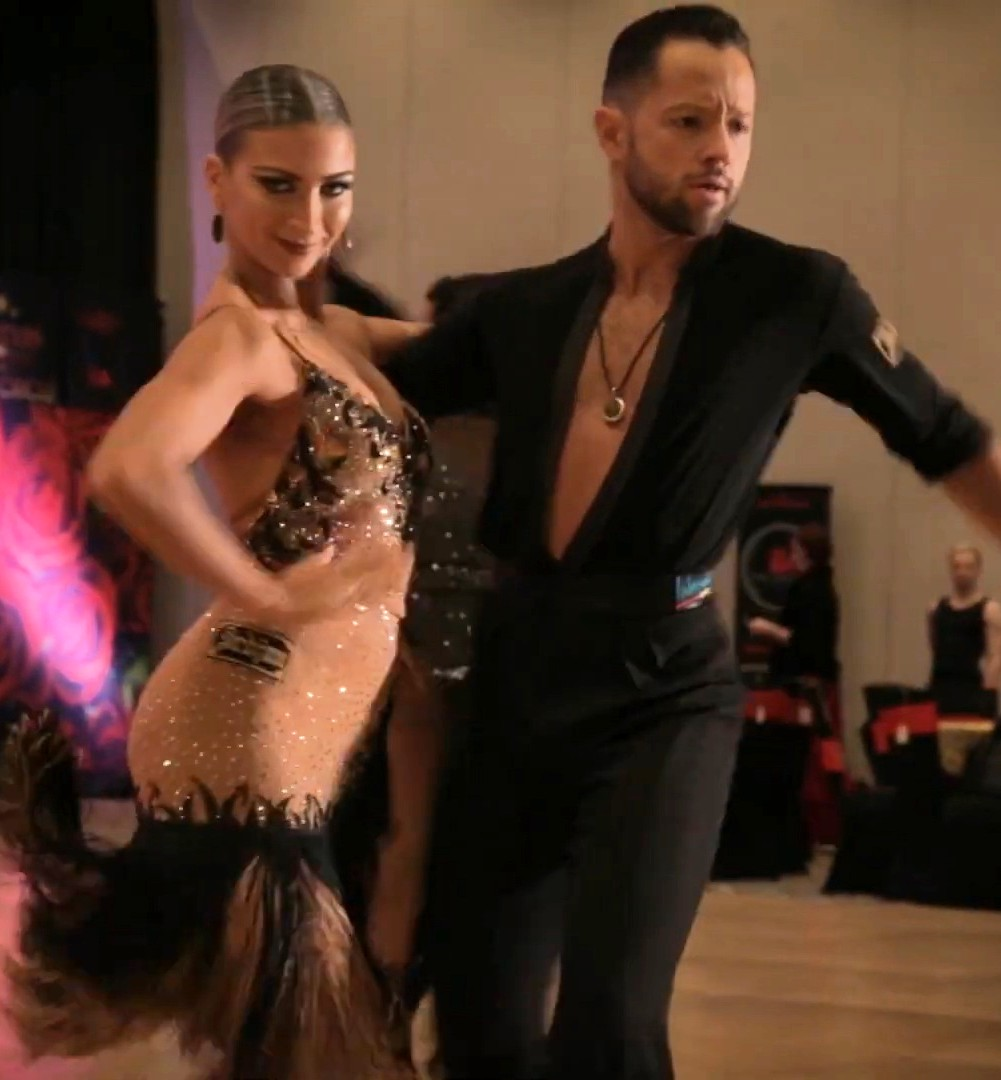
Daniella Karagach on Panache Star Dancesport, 2019

Karagach formed a dance partnership with Leonid Juashkovsky and began her career in dancesport when she was eleven years old. Together, they became three-time USA Dance Junior I and II Latin Champions; represented the U.S. at the IDSF World Championships in Latvia, Russia, and Barcelona; and appeared in the second and third seasons of the competition series America's Ballroom Challenge.

In January 2009, Karagach paired with Pavel "Pasha" Pashkov. They were selected to represent the U.S. at the 2009 World Games in Taiwan and represented the United States in various international competitions and festivals. Karagach and Pashkov are seven-time U.S. 10-Dance Champions and Latin Champions. They also won the Rising Star Professional Championship at the 2017 Blackpool Dance Festival and the 2018 U.S. Latin American Showdance Championship. On television, they competed on the second season of World of Dance (2018) and choreographed for So You Think You Can Dance (2022).

=== Dancing with the Stars ===
Karagach joined the reality competition series Dancing with the Stars as a troupe dancer for season 28; she did not have a celebrity partner. For season 29, Karagach was paired with rapper and singer Nelly. They made it to the finals and placed third on November 23, 2020.

On the 30th season of Dancing with the Stars, Karagach was paired with basketball player Iman Shumpert. Despite a shaky beginning, the couple won the competition on November 22, 2021, making Shumpert the first NBA player to both make the finale and win. Karagach and Shumpert's contemporary piece to "I Got 5 on It (Tethered Mix)", for Halloween week, was hailed by critics and viewers as one of the best dances in the series' history. For her work on the season, Karagach received her first nomination for the Primetime Emmy Award for Outstanding Choreography.

On the 31st season of Dancing with the Stars, Karagach was paired with actor and bodybuilder Joseph Baena. Karagach was unable to compete for the second and third weeks after testing positive for COVID-19; she was temporarily replaced by troupe member Alexis Warr. Karagach and Baena were eliminated on October 18, 2022, finishing in 11th place, Karagach's lowest placement to date.

For season 32, Karagach was paired with singer-songwriter Jason Mraz. They made it to the finals and finished as the runners-up on December 5, 2023, behind actress Xochitl Gomez and Val Chmerkovskiy.

For season 33, Karagach was paired with basketball player Dwight Howard. They were eliminated during the quarterfinals on November 12, 2024, finishing in 6th place.

For season 34, Karagach partnered with The Traitors winner Dylan Efron. The couple made it to the finals, finishing in 4th place.

For season 35, she is paired with Paralympic track & field athlete Ezra Frech.

Season	Partner	Place
29	Nelly	3rd
30	Iman Shumpert	1st
31	Joseph Baena	11th
32	Jason Mraz	2nd
33	Dwight Howard	6th
34	Dylan Efron	4th
35	Ezra Frech	TBD

==== Season 29 ====
Celebrity partner: Nelly
Average score: 23.5/30

Week	Dance	Music	Judges' scores (Note: Individual judges' scores are listed in the following order: Carrie Ann Inaba, Derek Hough, Bruno Tonioli.)			Total score	Result
1	Salsa	"Ride wit Me" — Nelly	5	5	6	16	Safe
2	Cha-cha-cha	"Let's Groove" — Earth, Wind & Fire	6	6	6	18	Safe
3	Foxtrot	"It's All Right" (from Soul)	6	6	6	18	Safe
4	Paso doble	"All I Do Is Win" — DJ Khaled, feat. T-Pain, Ludacris, Rick Ross & Snoop Dogg	7	7	7	21	Safe
5	Samba	"Rhythm of the Night" — DeBarge	8	8	8	24	Safe
6	Viennese waltz	"Humble and Kind" — Tim McGraw	8	8	8	24	Safe
7	Argentine tango	"Can't Feel My Face" — The Weeknd	9	9	9	27	Safe
8	Rumba	"Nobody Knows" — The Tony Rich Project	7	7	7	21	Safe
8	Cha-cha-cha Relay	"Rain on Me" — Lady Gaga & Ariana Grande	—N/a			2 (Note: Nelly and Daniella received two bonus points in this dance relay.)	Safe
9	Jazz	"California Love" — Tupac, feat. Dr. Dre & Roger Troutman	8	8	8	24	Safe
9	Salsa Dance-off	"The Cup of Life" — Ricky Martin	0			0 (Note: Nelly and Daniella received zero bonus points for losing this dance-off.)	Safe
10 (Semifinals)	Paso doble	"Run Boy Run" — Woodkid	9	8	9	26	Safe
10 (Semifinals)	Jive	Jump, Jive an' Wail — The Brian Setzer Orchestra	10	10	10	30	Safe
11 (Finals)	Samba	"Rhythm of the Night" — DeBarge	9	9	9	27	Third place
11 (Finals)	Freestyle	"Savage" — Megan Thee Stallion & "Hypnotize" — The Notorious B.I.G.	10	10	10	30	Third place

==== Season 30 ====
Celebrity partner: Iman Shumpert
Average score: 32.6/40

Week	Dance	Music	Judges' scores (Note: Individual judges' scores are listed in the following order: Carrie Ann Inaba, Len Goodman, Derek Hough, Bruno Tonioli.)				Total score	Result
1	Jive	"Hey Ya!" — Outkast	7	4	5	5	21	Safe
2	Rumba	"U Know What's Up" — Donell Jones	7	6	6	6	25	Safe
3	Tango	"Piece of Me" — Britney Spears	7	6	—N/a (Note: Derek Hough was absent this week out of an "abundance of caution" after he had a "possible" exposure to COVID-19.)	6	19	Safe
4	Foxtrot	"Let It Go" (from Frozen)	8	6	8	8	30	Safe
4	Argentine tango	"Arabian Nights" "(from Aladdin)	9	7	9	8	33	Safe
5	Viennese waltz	"Hopelessly Devoted to You" — Olivia Newton-John	7	7	7	7	28	Safe
6	Contemporary	"I Got 5 on It (Tethered Mix)" (from Us)	10	10	10	10	40	Safe
7	Paso doble	"Another One Bites the Dust" — Queen"	9	7	8	8	32	Safe
7	Jive Relay	"Crazy Little Thing Called Love" — Queen"	—N/a				2 (Note: Iman and Daniella received two bonus points from Carrie Ann Inaba and Derek Hough in this dance relay.)	Safe
8	Cha-cha-cha	"Rhythm Nation" — Janet Jackson	9	8	9	9	35	Safe
8	Foxtrot Dance-off	"Again" — Janet Jackson	0				0 (Note: Iman and Daniella received zero bonus points for losing this dance-off.)	Safe
9 (Semifinals)	Tango	"Telephone" — Martynas	9	9	10	9	37	Safe
9 (Semifinals)	Jazz	"Dark Fantasy" — Kanye West	10	9	10	9	38	Safe
10 (Finals)	Cha-cha-cha & Foxtrot Fusion	"September" — Earth, Wind & Fire	10	10	10 (Note: This score was given by Julianne Hough after her brother, Derek, was diagnosed with COVID-19.)	10	40	Winners
10 (Finals)	Freestyle	"Lose Control" — Missy Elliott, feat. Ciara & Fat Man Scoop & "Bounce" — DJ Clent	10	10	10	10	40	Winners

==== Season 31 ====
Celebrity partner: Joseph Baena
Average score: 28.3/40

Week	Dance	Music	Judges' scores (Note: Individual judges' scores are listed in the following order: Carrie Ann Inaba, Len Goodman, Derek Hough, Bruno Tonioli.)				Total score	Result
1	Jive	"Pump It" — Black Eyed Peas	6	5	6	6	23	Safe
2 (Note: Daniella did not perform this week because she was diagnosed with COVID-19. She was replaced by Alexis Warr.)	Viennese waltz	"If I Can Dream" — Elvis Presley	6	6	6	6	24	Safe
3	Argentine tango	"Writing's on the Wall" (from Spectre)	8	7	7	7	29	Safe
4	Charleston	"A Star Is Born" (from Hercules)	7	7	7	7	28	Safe
5	Rumba	"My Way" — Frank Sinatra	9	8	9	8	34	Safe
5	Cha-cha-cha	"Shut Up and Dance" — Walk the Moon	8	8	8	8	32	Eliminated
5	Hustle & Lindy Hop Marathon	"Hot Stuff" — Donna Summer & "Jump, Jive an' Wail" — The Brian Setzer Orchestra	—N/a				4 (Note: Joseph and Daniella received four bonus points in this dance marathon.)	Eliminated

==== Season 32 ====
Celebrity partner: Jason Mraz
Average score: 26.6/30

Week	Dance	Music	Judges' scores (Note: Individual judges' scores are listed in the following order: Carrie Ann Inaba, Derek Hough, Bruno Tonioli.)			Total score	Result
1	Cha-cha-cha	"I Feel Like Dancing" — Jason Mraz	7	7	7	21	Safe
2	Rumba	"Quizás, Quizás, Quizás" — Andrea Bocelli, feat. Jennifer Lopez	8	8	8	24	Safe
3	Jive	"Do You Love Me" — The Contours	9	8	8	34 (Note: Jason and Daniella also received a score of 9 from guest judge Michael Strahan.)	Safe
4	Foxtrot	"A Whole New World" (from Aladdin)	8	8	8	24	Safe
5	Quickstep	"On the Road Again" — Willie Nelson	9	9	9	27	Safe
6	Contemporary	"Zombie" — The Cranberries	9	9	9	36 (Note: Jason and Daniella also received a score of 9 from guest judge Niecy Nash-Betts.)	Safe
6	Hustle & Charleston; Marathon	"Stayin' Alive" — Bee Gees & "Grim Grinning Ghosts" — Kris Bowers	—N/a			3 (Note: Jason and Daniella received three bonus points in this dance marathon.)	Safe
7	Jazz	"Take On Me" — a-ha	8	8 (Note: Jason and Daniella also received a score of 10 from guest judge Paula Abdul.)	9	72	Safe
7	Team Freestyle	"Everybody (Backstreet's Back)" — Backstreet Boys	9	9 (Note: This team also received a score of 10 from guest judge Paula Abdul.)	9	72	Safe
8	Samba	"Higher Love" — Kygo & Whitney Houston	8	9	8	33 (Note: Jason and Daniella also received a score of 8 from guest judge Billy Porter.)	Safe
8	Salsa Dance-off	"It's Not Right but It's Okay" — Whitney Houston	Lost the event			0 (Note: Jason and Daniella received zero bonus points for losing this dance-off.)	Safe
9	Argentine tango	"Don't Blame Me" — Taylor Swift	10	10	10	40 (Note: Jason and Daniella also received a score of 10 from guest judge Mandy Moore.)	Safe
9	Cha-cha-cha Relay	"Lavender Haze (Felix Jaehn Remix)" — Taylor Swift	Wins this event			3 (Note: Jason and Daniella also received three bonus points for winning this dance relay.)	Safe
10 (Semifinals)	Viennese waltz	"I Won't Give Up" — Jason Mraz	9	9	9	57	Safe
10 (Semifinals)	Paso doble	"Diablo Rojo" — Rodrigo y Gabriela	10	10	10	57	Safe
11 (Finals)	Foxtrot	"Fly Me to the Moon" — Frank Sinatra	10	10	10	60	Runners-up
11 (Finals)	Freestyle	"Happy" — C2C, feat. Derek Martin	10	10	10	60	Runners-up

==== Season 33 ====
Celebrity partner: Dwight Howard
Average score: 23/30

Week	Dance	Music	Judges' scores (Note: Individual judges' scores are listed in the following order: Carrie Ann Inaba, Derek Hough, Bruno Tonioli.)			Total score	Result
1	Salsa	"This Is How We Do It" — Montell Jordan	8	7	7	22	Safe
2	Foxtrot	"City of Stars" (from La La Land)	8	7	7	22	Safe
3	Cha-cha-cha	"Let's Groove" — Earth, Wind & Fire	6	5	6	23 (Note: Dwight and Daniella also received a score of 6 from guest judge Rosie Perez.)	Safe
3	Paso doble	"Walk This Way" — Aerosmith	8	7	7	29 (Note: Dwight and Daniella also received a score of 7 from guest judge Gene Simmons.)	Safe
4	Rumba	"Shoot for the Stars" — Dwight Howard	7	8	7	29 (Note: Dwight and Daniella also received a score of 7 from guest judge Mark Ballas.)	Safe
5	Tango	"When Can I See You Again?" (from Wreck-It Ralph)	8	8	8	48	Safe
5	Team Freestyle	"I Just Can't Wait to Be King" (from The Lion King)	8	8	8	48	Safe
6	Contemporary	"Ring Around the Rosie" — District 78	10	9	9	28	Safe
6	Cha-cha-cha Dance-off	"Ghostbusters" — Ray Parker Jr.	+3			3 (Note: Dwight and Daniella received three bonus points for winning this dance-off.)	Safe
7 (Quarterfinals)	Argentine tango	"Santa María (del Buen Ayre)" — Gotan Project	8	9	9	48	Eliminated
7 (Quarterfinals)	Instant Paso doble	"Victorious" — Panic! at the Disco	8	7	7	48	Eliminated

==== Season 34 ====
Celebrity partner: Dylan Efron
Average score: 25.9/30

Week	Dance	Music	Judges' scores (Note: Individual judges' scores are listed in the following order: Carrie Ann Inaba, Derek Hough, Bruno Tonioli.)			Total score	Result
1	Cha-cha-cha	"Milkshake" — Kelis	—N/a	5	5	10 (Note: Due to Carrie Ann Inaba's absence, scores were given on a 20 point scale.)	No Elimination
2	Samba	"Macarena (Bayside Boys Remix)" — Los del Río	7	6	7	20	Safe
3	Foxtrot	"Yukon" — Justin Bieber	7	8	8	23	Safe
4	Quickstep	"Life Is a Highway" — Tom Cochrane	7	8	8	23	Safe
5	Contemporary	"Rewrite the Stars" — Zac Efron & Zendaya	9	9	9	36 (Note: Dylan and Daniella also received a score of 9 from guest judge Kym Johnson.)	No Elimination
6	Rumba	"I'm Not That Girl" — Cynthia Erivo	8	8	8	32 (Note: Dylan and Daniella also received a score of 8 from guest judge Jon M. Chu.)	Safe
7	Viennese waltz	"Can't Help Falling in Love (Dark)" — Tommee Profitt & Brooke	9	9	9	35 (Note: Dylan and Daniella also received a score of 8 from guest judge Cheryl Burke.)	Safe
7	Hustle & Lindy Hop Marathon	"Murder on the Dancefloor" — Sophie Ellis-Bextor "A Little Party Never Killed Nobody (All We Got)" — Fergie, Q-Tip, & GoonRock	+3			3 (Note: Dylan and Daniella also received 3 extra points from the dance marathon.)	Safe
8	Jive	"I'm Still Standing" — Elton John	8	9	9	36 (Note: Dylan and Daniella also received a score of 10 from guest judge Flavor Flav.)	Safe
8	Team Freestyle	"25 or 6 to 4" — Chicago	10	10	10	40 (Note: The team dance also received a score of 10 from guest judge Flavor Flav.)	Safe
9	Argentine tango	"Ain't No Sunshine" — Bill Withers	10	10	10	40 (Note: Dylan and Daniella also received a score of 10 from guest judge Tom Bergeron.)	Safe
9	Viennese waltz Relay (Note: Dylan danced in the relay round with season 20 winner Rumer Willis.)	"Earned It" — The Weeknd	Winner			2 (Note: Dylan and Daniella also received 2 bonus points for Dylan winning the dance-off with Rumer.)	Safe
10	Tango	"I Would Die 4 U" — Prince	9	9	9	27	Safe
10	Cha-cha-cha	"Kiss" — Prince	9	9	10	28	Safe
11	Paso doble	"Stampede" — Alexander Jean, feat. Lindsey Stirling	9	9	10	28	Fourth Place
11	Foxtrot	"Ordinary" — Alex Warren	10	10	10	30	Fourth Place
11	Freestyle	"Something in the Heavens" — Lewis Capaldi	10	10	10	30	Fourth Place

==== Season 35 ====
Celebrity partner: Ezra Frech
Average score: TBA

Week	Dance	Music	Judges' scores (Note: Individual judges' scores are listed in the following order: Carrie Ann Inaba, Derek Hough, Bruno Tonioli.)			Total score	Result
1	Tango	"Since U Been Gone" — Kelly Clarkson	7	6	7	20	Safe
2	Cha-cha-cha	"Low" — Flo Rida	7	7	7	21	Safe
3	Foxtrot	"Just the Two of Us" — Grover Washington Jr.	7	7	7	21	Safe
4	Rumba	“Anytime You Need a Friend” — Mariah Carey	8	8	8	24	Safe
5	Salsa	“Hot in Herre” — Nelly	9	9	9	36	Safe
6	Contemporary	“Bloodline” — Mon Rovia	9	9	9	37	Safe
7	Jazz	“Madness” — Ruelle	8	9	9	35	Safe
8	Samba	“Under the Sea” from The Little Mermaid	9	10	9	37	Safe
8	Freestyle (Team Dance)	"We're All in This Together" from High School Musical on Stage!	10	10	10	40	Safe
9 (Quarterfinals)	Argentine tango	“Crazy in Love (Remix)” — Beyoncé	9	9	9	27	Safe
9 (Quarterfinals)	Rumba (Dance-off)	"The Boy Is Mine" — Brandy & Monica	Lost against Amber Glenn & Pasha Pashkov			0	Safe
10 (Semifinals)	Quickstep	“Kryptonite” — 3 Doors Down	9	9	9	27	Safe
10 (Semifinals)	Jive	“Footloose” — Kenny Loggins	10	10	10	30	Safe
11 (Finals)	TBA	TBA					TBA
11 (Finals)	TBA	TBA					TBA
11 (Finals)	Freestyle	TBA					TBA

== Personal life ==
Karagach was introduced to Russian professional dancer Pasha Pashkov through their respective coaches; she was 16 years old at the time, and he was 22. They began dating amidst their training in 2011. Pashkov proposed on January 1, 2012, and they were married on July 18, 2014. They launched an online dance program in 2020 to prepare engaged couples for their first dance. On July 19, 2025, to commemorate their eleventh wedding anniversary, Karagach and Pashkov renewed their vows in Cabo San Lucas, Mexico.

After learning that she was pregnant in July 2022, Karagach suffered a miscarriage at five weeks gestation. Four months later, she and Pashkov announced that they were expecting a rainbow baby. Their daughter, Nikita Sofia Pashkova, was born on May 30, 2023.

== Accolades ==
Award	Year (Note: Indicates the year of ceremony. Each year is linked to the article about the awards held that year, wherever possible.)	Recipient(s)	Category	Result	Ref.
Primetime Creative Arts Emmy Awards	2022	Karagach	Outstanding Choreography (for "I Got 5 on It" / "Dark Fantasy" )	Nominated	

=== Dancing with the Stars achievements ===
Awards and achievements
Preceded by Kaitlyn Bristowe & Artem Chigvintsev	Dancing with the Stars (US) winner Season 30 (Fall 2021 with Iman Shumpert)	Succeeded by Charli D'Amelio & Mark Ballas
Preceded by Gabby Windey & Val Chmerkovskiy	Dancing with the Stars (US) runner-up Season 32 (Fall 2023 with Jason Mraz)	Succeeded by Ilona Maher & Alan Bersten
Preceded by Ally Brooke & Sasha Farber	Dancing with the Stars (US) third place contestant Season 29 (Fall 2020 with Nelly)	Succeeded by Cody Rigsby & Cheryl Burke
Preceded by Stephen Nedoroscik & Rylee Arnold	Dancing with the Stars (US) fourth place contestant Season 34 (Fall 2025 with Dylan Efron)	Succeeded by
