= Choreography on Broadway =

Aspect of Broadway theatre

Choreography on Broadway refers to the creation and staging of dance and movement for theatrical productions presented on Broadway. Although Broadway musicals have been extensively documented through scripts, scores, and production histories, their dance traditions have often been less completely preserved.

For the most part, dance movement itself was either the last to be mentioned by critics or ignored altogether, resulting in dance numbers in musicals going unrecorded. The only way to preserve dance movements from generation to generation was by demonstration, imitation, practice, and personal supervision.

Not until 1960, with the musical Bye Bye Birdie, did the permanent notation of a show's complete choreography exist.

== History ==
The integration of dance into a unified stage effect became an important development in Broadway choreography. One of the earliest successful examples of this concept was in Pal Joey. The dancing in the show enhanced the environment and projected character without any reduction in the flashy entertainment values then prized in musical shows.

In 1943, Agnes de Mille choreographed the dream ballet for Oklahoma!. The sequence used dance to advance the plot and illuminate the emotional lives of the characters, helping establish storytelling through choreography as a foundational element of musical theatre.

== Director-choreographers ==
As dance became more closely connected with character development and plot advancement, director-choreographers including Jerome Robbins, Bob Fosse, and Gower Champion became central figures in Broadway choreography.

Robbins integrated choreography with character, dramatic conflict and staging in works including West Side Story. His approach helped establish the director-choreographer as a central creative figure in musical theatre. Bob Fosse further developed this model in productions including Sweet Charity, Pippin, Chicago and Dancin'.

Fosse frequently reworked material from writers to serve his staging and choreography. His use of self-contained acts drawing on vaudeville and burlesque became a distinctive feature of his Broadway work.

Kislan contrasted Champion's approach with those of Robbins and Fosse, describing his choreography as embellishing, extending, and enlarging emotions already present in a musical. Champion's work included Bye Bye Birdie in 1960 and 42nd Street in 1980.

== See also ==
- Dramatic structure
- Tony Award for Best Choreography
- Musical theatre
- Broadway theatre
