= The Bachelor (American TV series) season 29 =

The Bachelor
- Season 29
- Promotional poster
- Starring: Grant Ellis
- Presented by: Jesse Palmer
- No. of contestants: 25
- Winner: Juliana Pasquarosa
- Runner-up: Litia Garr
- No. of episodes: 9

Release
- Original network: ABC
- Original release: January 27 – March 24, 2025

Additional information
- Filming dates: September 18 – October 31, 2024

Season chronology
- ← Previous; Season 28

The twenty-ninth season of The Bachelor premiered on January 27, 2025. This season features 30-year-old Grant Ellis, a day trader from Newark, New Jersey.

Ellis finished in fifth place on the 21st season of The Bachelorette featuring Jenn Tran. He is the second Black male lead in The Bachelor franchise, but the first to have appeared as a contestant on a previous season.

The season concluded on March 24, 2025, with Ellis choosing to propose to 28-year-old client service associate Juliana Pasquarosa. They announced their breakup on June 13, 2025.

== Production ==
=== Casting and contestants ===
On August 12, 2024, Ellis was announced as the Bachelor immediately after his elimination on Tran's season aired.

Notable contestants include Miss California USA 2020 Allyshia Gupta, who placed in the top 10 at Miss USA 2020, Carolina Quixano, who was a contestant on game show We Are Family in February 2024, and Vicky Nyamuswa, who was a member of the Las Vegas Raiderettes from 2020 to 2023.

=== Filming and development ===
Filming began on September 18, 2024, in Agoura Hills, California. On October 7, 2024, filming was reported in Edinburgh, Scotland.

This season also includes visits to Madrid, Spain and the Dominican Republic.

Singers Mario and Emeli Sandé; choreographer Robin Antin; entrepreneur Daniel Lubetzky; comedian Hannah Berner; reality television personality Lisa Vanderpump; The Golden Bachelorette contestants Gary Levingston, Jack Lencioni, Jonathan Rone, and Keith Gordon; previous Bachelor Joey Graziadei; and previous contestants Daisy Kent, Kaity Biggar, and Rachel Nance made guest appearances this season.

== Contestants ==
27 potential contestants were revealed on September 16, 2024.

The final cast of 25 women was announced on January 7, 2025.

| Name | Age | Hometown | Occupation | Outcome | Place | Ref |
|---|---|---|---|---|---|---|
| Juliana Pasquarosa | 28 | Newton, Massachusetts | Client Service Associate | Winner | 1 | |
| Litia Garr | 31 | Star Valley, Wyoming | Venture Capitalist | Week 8 | 2 | |
| Zoe McGrady | 27 | Chester, Virginia | Tech Engineer / Model | Week 7 | 3 | |
| Dina Lupancu | 32 | Willowbrook, Illinois | Attorney | Week 6 | 4 | |
| Alexe Godin | 27 | Néguac, New Brunswick | Pediatric Speech Therapist | Week 5 | 5–7 | |
| Carolina Quixano | 28 | Guaynabo, Puerto Rico (Note: Quixano is originally from Guaynabo, Puerto Rico but was residing in West Hollywood, California at the time of casting and filming.) | Public Relations Producer | Week 5 | 5–7 | |
| Sarafiena Watkins | 29 | Cos Cob, Connecticut | Associate Media Director | Week 5 | 5–7 | |
| Natalie Phillips | 25 | Seattle, Washington | PhD Student | Week 4 | 8–9 | |
| Parisa Shifteh | 29 | Birmingham, Michigan | Pediatric Behavior Analyst | Week 4 | 8–9 | |
| Rose Sombke | 27 | Rockford, Illinois | Registered Nurse | Week 4 | 10 (quit) | |
| Alli Jo Hinkes | 30 | Freehold, New Jersey | Boxing Trainer | Week 3 | 11–13 | |
| Bailey Brown | 27 | Atlanta, Georgia | Social Media Manager | Week 3 | 11–13 | |
| Chloie Costello | 27 | Mission Hills, Kansas | Model | Week 3 | 11–13 | |
| Beverly Ortega | 30 | Howard Beach, New York | Insurance Salesperson | Week 3 | 14 (MD) (Note: Ortega was medically removed in week 3 after being diagnosed with appendicitis.) | |
| Allyshia Gupta | 29 | Wesley Chapel, Florida | Interior Designer | Week 2 | 15–18 | |
| Ella Del Rosario | 25 | Los Angeles, California | Luxury Travel Host | Week 2 | 15–18 | |
| Rebekah Garrett | 31 | Dallas, Texas | ICU Nurse | Week 2 | 15–18 | |
| Vicky Nyamuswa | 28 | Henderson, Nevada | Nightclub Server | Week 2 | 15–18 | |
| Christina Smith | 26 | Kindred, North Dakota | Marketing Director | Week 1 | 19–25 | |
| J'Nae Squires-Horton | 28 | Colorado Springs, Colorado | Account Coordinator | Week 1 | 19–25 | |
| Kelsey Curtis | 26 | Clarksville, Maryland | Interior Designer | Week 1 | 19–25 | |
| Kyleigh Henrich | 26 | Glen Rose, Texas | Retail Manager | Week 1 | 19–25 | |
| Neicey Baxter | 32 | Blythewood, South Carolina | Pediatrician | Week 1 | 19–25 | |
| Radhika Gupta | 28 | Floral Park, New York | Attorney | Week 1 | 19–25 | |
| Savannah Quinn | 27 | Charlottesville, Virginia | Wedding Planner | Week 1 | 19–25 | |

=== Future appearances ===
==== Bachelor in Paradise ====
Season 10

Alexe Godin, Alli Jo Hinkes, Allyshia Gupta, Bailey Brown, Parisa Shifteh and Zoe McGrady returned for season 10 of Bachelor in Paradise. Hinkes and McGrady were eliminated in week 2. Gupta and Shifta were eliminated and left in relationships with Sean McLaughlin and Brian Autz respectively in week 7. Brown was eliminated and left in a relationship with Jeremy Simon in week 9. Godin won $125,000 and left in a relationship with Andrew Spencer in the finale.

== Call-out order ==
| Order | Bachelorettes | Week | | | | | | | |
| Order | Bachelorettes | 1 | 2 | 3 | 4 | 5 | 6 | 7 | 8 |
|---|---|---|---|---|---|---|---|---|---|
| 1 | Rose | Alexe | Natalie | Parisa | Dina | Litia | Litia | Litia | Juliana |
| 2 | Litia | Litia | Alexe | Carolina | Sarafiena | Juliana | Juliana | Juliana | Litia |
| 3 | J'Nae | Rose | Litia | Litia | Litia | Dina | Zoe | Zoe | |
| 4 | Parisa | Zoe | Juliana | Zoe | Juliana | Zoe | Dina | | |
| 5 | Carolina | Ella | Beverly | Juliana | Alexe | Alexe; Carolina; Sarafiena | | | |
| 6 | Alli Jo | Alli Jo | Sarafiena | Alexe | Zoe | Alexe; Carolina; Sarafiena | | | |
| 7 | Dina | Natalie | Carolina | Dina | Carolina | Alexe; Carolina; Sarafiena | | | |
| 8 | Radhika | Juliana | Zoe | Natalie | Natalie; Parisa | | | | |
| 9 | Allyshia | Vicky | Dina | Sarafiena | Natalie; Parisa | | | | |
| 10 | Natalie | Carolina | Rose | Rose | Rose | | | | |
| 11 | Beverly | Beverly | Bailey | Alli Jo; Bailey; Chloie | | | | | |
| 12 | Alexe | Bailey | Parisa | Alli Jo; Bailey; Chloie | | | | | |
| 13 | Juliana | Dina | Alli Jo | Alli Jo; Bailey; Chloie | | | | | |
| 14 | Chloie | Chloie | Chloie | Beverly | | | | | |
| 15 | Bailey | Rebekah | Allyshia; Ella; Rebekah; Vicky | | | | | | |
| 16 | Sarafiena | Sarafiena | Allyshia; Ella; Rebekah; Vicky | | | | | | |
| 17 | Kyleigh | Allyshia | Allyshia; Ella; Rebekah; Vicky | | | | | | |
| 18 | Ella | Parisa | Allyshia; Ella; Rebekah; Vicky | | | | | | |
| 19 | Rebekah | Christina; J'Nae; Kelsey; Kyleigh; Neicey; Radhika; Savannah | | | | | | | |
| 20 | Christina | Christina; J'Nae; Kelsey; Kyleigh; Neicey; Radhika; Savannah | | | | | | | |
| 21 | Neicey | Christina; J'Nae; Kelsey; Kyleigh; Neicey; Radhika; Savannah | | | | | | | |
| 22 | Kelsey | Christina; J'Nae; Kelsey; Kyleigh; Neicey; Radhika; Savannah | | | | | | | |
| 23 | Savannah | Christina; J'Nae; Kelsey; Kyleigh; Neicey; Radhika; Savannah | | | | | | | |
| 24 | Vicky | Christina; J'Nae; Kelsey; Kyleigh; Neicey; Radhika; Savannah | | | | | | | |
| 25 | Zoe | Christina; J'Nae; Kelsey; Kyleigh; Neicey; Radhika; Savannah | | | | | | | |

The contestant received the first impression rose
The contestant received a rose during a date
The contestant received a rose outside of a rose ceremony or date
The contestant was eliminated
The contestant was eliminated during a date
The contestant was eliminated outside the rose ceremony
The contestant was medically removed from the competition
The contestant quit the competition
The contestant won the competition

== Episodes ==
| No. overall | No. in season | Title | Original release date | Prod. code | U.S. viewers (millions) |
|---|---|---|---|---|---|
| 298 | 1 | "Week 1: Season Premiere" | January 27, 2025 | 2901 | 2.72 |
| 299 | 2 | "Week 2" | February 3, 2025 | 2902 | 2.36 |
| 300 | 3 | "Week 3" | February 10, 2025 | 2903 | 2.36 |
| 301 | 4 | "Week 4: Madrid" | February 17, 2025 | 2904 | 2.53 |
| 302 | 5 | "Week 5: Scotland" | February 24, 2025 | 2905 | 2.51 |
| 303 | 6 | "Week 6: Hometowns" | March 3, 2025 | 2906 | 2.86 |
| 304 | 7 | "The Women Tell All" | March 10, 2025 | N/A | 2.39 |
| 305 | 8 | "Week 7: Fantasy Suites" | March 17, 2025 | 2907 | 2.50 |
| 306 | 9 | "Week 8: Season Finale & After the Final Rose" | March 24, 2025 | 2908 | 3.22 |

== Ratings ==
Viewership and ratings per episode of The Bachelor (American TV series) season 29
| No. | Title | Air date | Rating/share (18–49) | Viewers (millions) | DVR (18–49) | DVR viewers (millions) | Total (18–49) | Total viewers (millions) | Ref. |
|---|---|---|---|---|---|---|---|---|---|
| 1 | "Week 1: Season Premiere" | January 27, 2025 | 0.4/6 | 2.72 | 0.1 | 0.62 | 0.6 | 3.41 | |
| 2 | "Week 2" | February 3, 2025 | 0.4/6 | 2.36 | 0.1 | 0.66 | 0.6 | 3.01 | |
| 3 | "Week 3" | February 10, 2025 | 0.4/5 | 2.36 | 0.1 | 0.68 | 0.5 | 3.05 | |
| 4 | "Week 4: Madrid" | February 17, 2025 | 0.5/6 | 2.53 | 0.1 | 0.64 | 0.6 | 3.16 | |
| 5 | "Week 5: Scotland" | February 24, 2025 | 0.5/6 | 2.51 | 0.1 | 0.57 | 0.6 | 3.08 | |
| 6 | "Week 6: Hometowns" | March 3, 2025 | 0.5/7 | 2.86 | 0.1 | 0.55 | 0.6 | 3.42 | |
| 7 | "The Women Tell All" | March 10, 2025 | 0.3/5 | 2.39 | 0.1 | 0.54 | 0.5 | 2.93 | |
| 8 | "Week 7: Fantasy Suites" | March 17, 2025 | 0.4/5 | 2.50 | 0.1 | 0.61 | 0.5 | 3.11 | |
| 9 | "Week 8: Season Finale & After the Final Rose" | March 24, 2025 | 0.6/9 | 3.22 | 0.1 | 0.57 | 0.7 | 3.80 | |
