= Bachelor in Paradise (American TV series) season 10 =

Bachelor in Paradise
- Season 10
- Promotional poster
- No. of episodes: 10

Release
- Original network: ABC
- Original release: July 7 – September 2, 2025

Season chronology
- ← Previous; Season 9

The tenth season of Bachelor in Paradise premiered on July 7, 2025, with Jesse Palmer returning as host.

== Production ==
Filming took place in Costa Rica, making this the first season of Paradise to be filmed somewhere other than Mexico. Wells Adams returned as bartender, and was joined by former Bachelorette Hannah Brown as co-bartender.

For the first time, the season included contestants from The Golden Bachelor and The Golden Bachelorette.

Relationship therapist Laura Berman made a guest appearance this season.

=== Casting ===
On August 27, 2024, Jonathon Johnson and Hakeem Moulton were confirmed as contestants during the Bachelorette season 21 Men Tell All special.

On March 24, 2025, Zoe McGrady, Leslie Fhima, and Gary Levingston were confirmed as contestants during the Bachelor season 29 After the Final Rose special.

The rest of the original cast was announced on June 10, 2025.

The Golden cast was announced on June 16, 2025.

== Contestants ==
Name	Age	Residence	From	Arrived	Eliminated
Spencer Conley	32	Dallas, Texas	The Bachelorette – Jenn	Week 1	Engaged
Jess Edwards	26	San Diego, California	The Bachelor – Joey	Week 1	Engaged
Andrew Spencer	30	Chicago, Illinois	The Bachelorette – Katie; Bachelor in Paradise – Season 8	Week 3	Relationship
Alexe Godin	28	Los Angeles, California	The Bachelor – Grant	Week 1	Relationship
Dale Moss	36	New York City, New York	The Bachelorette – Clare	Week 1	Relationship (Eliminated Week 10)
Kat Izzo	28	San Diego, California	The Bachelor – Zach; Bachelor in Paradise – Season 9	Week 1	Relationship (Eliminated Week 10)
Jeremy Simon	30	New York City, New York	The Bachelorette – Jenn	Week 1	Relationship (Eliminated Week 9)
Bailey Brown	28	Atlanta, Georgia	The Bachelor – Grant	Week 1	Relationship (Eliminated Week 9)
Keith Gordon	63	San Jose, California	The Golden Bachelorette	Week 3	Week 9
Kathy Swarts	72	Austin, Texas	The Golden Bachelor	Week 3	Week 9
Jonathon Johnson	28	Los Angeles, California	The Bachelorette – Jenn	Week 1	Week 8
Lea Cayanan	25	Los Angeles, California	The Bachelor – Joey	Week 4	Week 8
Brian Autz	34	Boynton Beach, Florida	The Bachelorette – Jenn	Week 1	Week 7
Parisa Shifteh	30	Birmingham, Michigan	The Bachelor – Grant	Week 2	Week 7
Sean McLaughlin	28	Tampa, Florida	The Bachelorette – Charity; Bachelor in Paradise – Season 9	Week 3	Week 7 (Quit)
Allyshia Gupta	30	Wesley Chapel, Florida	The Bachelor – Grant	Week 4	Week 7 (Quit)
Kim Buike	70	Seattle, Washington	The Golden Bachelorette	Week 3	Week 6
Faith Martin	62	Benton City, Washington	The Golden Bachelor	Week 4	Week 6
Gary Levingston	66	Palm Desert, California	The Golden Bachelorette	Week 3	Week 5
Leslie Fhima	66	Minneapolis, Minnesota	The Golden Bachelor	Week 3	Week 5
April Kirkwood	67	Port St. Lucie, Florida	The Golden Bachelor	Week 3	Week 4
Nancy Hulkower	62	Alexandria, Virginia	The Golden Bachelor	Week 4	Week 4
Natascha Hardee	62	New York City, New York	The Golden Bachelor	Week 3	Week 4
Jill Chin	29	Newport, Rhode Island	The Bachelor – Clayton; Bachelor in Paradise – Season 8	Week 2	Week 4 (Quit)
Charles "CK" King	63	Rancho Palos Verdes, California	The Golden Bachelorette	Week 3	Week 3
Jack Lencioni	69	Chicago, Illinois	The Golden Bachelorette	Week 3	Week 3
Ralph "RJ" Johnson	67	Irvine, California	The Golden Bachelorette	Week 3	Week 3
Alli Jo Hinkes	31	Fort Lauderdale, Florida	The Bachelor – Grant	Week 2	Week 2
Zoe McGrady	28	New York City, New York	The Bachelor – Grant	Week 1	Week 2
Justin Glaze	30	Los Angeles, California	The Bachelorette – Katie; Bachelor in Paradise – Season 8	Week 1	Week 2 (Quit)
Lexi Young	31	Atlanta, Georgia	The Bachelor – Joey	Week 1	Week 2 (Quit)
Susie Evans	31	Los Angeles, California	The Bachelor – Clayton	Week 2	Week 2 (Quit)
Hakeem Moulton	30	Schaumburg, Illinois	The Bachelorette – Jenn	Week 1	Week 1
Kyle Howard	31	Los Angeles, California	The Bachelorette – Katie	Week 1	Week 1
Ricky Marinez	29	Miami, Florida	The Bachelorette – Jenn	Week 1	Week 1
Sam McKinney	28	Myrtle Beach, South Carolina	The Bachelorette – Jenn	Week 1	Week 1

== Elimination table ==
Place	Contestant	Week									
Place	Contestant	1	2	3	4	5	6	7	8	9	10
1-4	Spencer	In	In	In	In	In	In	Date	In	In	Engaged
1-4	Jess	Date	In	In	In	In	In	Date	In	In	Engaged
1-4	Andrew	Wait		Date	In	In	In	In	In	In	Relationship
1-4	Alexe	In	In	In	In	In	In	In	In	In	Relationship
5-6	Dale	Date	In	In	In	In	In	In	Date	Last	Out
5-6	Kat	Date	In	In	In	In	In	In	Date	Last	Out
7-10	Jeremy	In	Date	In	In	Date	In	In	In	Out	
7-10	Bailey	In	In	Date	In	Date	In	In	In	Out	
7-10	Keith	Wait		In	In	In	In	In	Last	Out	
7-10	Kathy	Wait		In	In	In	In	In	Last	Out	
11-12	Jonathon	Last	Date	Last	Date	In	In	Last	Out		
11-12	Lea	Wait			Date	In	In	Last	Out		
13-14	Brian	In	Date	In	In	Last	Last	Out			
13-14	Parisa	Wait	Date	In	In	Last	Last	Out			
15-16	Sean	Wait		Date	Date	In	In	Quit			
15-16	Allyshia	Wait			Date	In	In	Quit			
17-18	Kim	Wait		In	In	In	Out				
17-18	Faith	Wait			Date	In	Out				
19-20	Gary	Wait		Date	Date	Out					
19-20	Leslie	Wait		Date	Last	Out					
21-23	April	Wait		In	Out						
21-23	Nancy	Wait			Out						
21-23	Natascha	Wait		In	Out						
24	Jill	Wait	Last	Date	Quit						
25-27	CK	Wait		Out							
25-27	Jack	Wait		Out							
25-27	RJ	Wait		Out							
28-29	Alli Jo	Wait	Out								
28-29	Zoe	In	Out								
30	Justin	Date	Quit								
31	Lexi	Date	Quit								
32	Susie	Wait	Quit								
33-36	Hakeem	Out									
33-36	Kyle	Out									
33-36	Ricky	Out									
33-36	Sam	Out									

=== Key ===
The contestant is male
The contestant is female
Date The contestant went on a date and gave out a rose at the rose ceremony
Date The contestant went on a date and got a rose at the rose ceremony
In The contestant gave or received a rose at the rose ceremony, thus remaining in the competition
Last The contestant received the last rose
Last The contestant went on a date and received the last rose
Out The contestant went on a date and was eliminated
Out The contestant was eliminated
Quit The contestant went on a date and rejected a rose
Quit The contestant had a date and voluntarily left the show
Quit The contestant voluntarily left the show
Out The contestant was medically evacuated.
Split The couple broke up and was eliminated
Split The couple had a date, then broke up and was eliminated
Split The contestant split after Bachelor in Paradise ended
Stay The couple decided to stay together
Wait The contestant had to wait before appearing in paradise
Split/Stay The contestant split then started dating again after paradise
Split/Stay The contestant split before a rose ceremony and started dating again after BIP ended

== Episodes ==
No. overall	No. in season	Title	Original release date	Prod. code	U.S. viewers (millions)	Rating/share (18–49)
101	1	"Episode 1: Season Premiere"	July 7, 2025	1001	1.84	0.3/6
Arrivals: Spencer, Alexe, Lexi, Jeremy, Jonathon, Bailey, Hakeem, Jess, Kyle, Zoe, Ricky, Brian, Kat, and Justin. Date Card: Justin; Justin's Date: Lexi; New Arrival: Dale; Dale's Date: Kat; New Arrival: Sam; Sam's Date: Jess; Rose Ceremony: Lexi gave her rose to Justin, Zoe gave her rose to Brian, Kat gave her rose to Dale, Jess gave her rose to Spencer, Bailey gave her rose to Jeremy, and Alexe gave her rose to Jonathon. Hakeem, Kyle, Ricky, and Sam did not receive a rose and were sent home.
102	2	"Episode 2"	July 14, 2025	1002	1.44	0.2/3
New Arrivals: Alli Jo and Parisa; Alli Jo & Parisa's Double Date: Jonathon & Brian; New Arrival: Jill; Jill's Date: Jonathon; New Arrival: Susie; Susie's Date: Jeremy; Rose Ceremony: Spencer gave his rose to Jess, Dale gave his rose to Kat, Jeremy gave his rose to Bailey, Brian gave his rose to Parisa, and Jonathon gave his rose to Alexe. Justin offered his rose to Susie, but she rejected it.
103	3	"Episode 3"	July 15, 2025	1003	1.48	0.2/3
Rose Ceremony (continued): Susie, Lexi, and Justin self-eliminated after Susie rejected Justin's rose, with Justin offering his rose to Jill before departing. Alli Jo and Zoe did not receive a rose and were sent home. New Arrivals: April, CK, Jack, Kathy, Keith, Kim, Leslie, Natascha, and RJ. New Arrival: Andrew; Andrew's Date: Bailey; New Arrival: Sean; Sean's Date: Jill
104	4	"Episode 4"	July 21, 2025	1004	1.82	0.3/5
New Arrival: Gary; Gary's Date: Leslie; Rose Ceremony: Parisa gave her rose to Brian, Bailey gave her rose to Jeremy, Alexe gave her rose to Andrew, Natascha gave her rose to Gary, Leslie gave her rose to Kim, Kathy gave her rose to Keith, Jess gave her rose to Spencer, Jill gave her rose to Sean, Kat gave her rose to Dale, and April gave her rose to Jonathon. CK, Jack, and RJ did not receive a rose and were sent home. New Arrivals: Lea and Nancy
105	5	"Episode 5"	July 28, 2025	1005	1.81	0.3/4
New Arrival: Faith; Lea's Date: Jonathon; Nancy's Date: Gary; New Arrival: Allyshia; Departure: Jill; Faith's Date: Kathy; Allyshia's Date: Sean
106	6	"Episode 6"	August 4, 2025	1006	1.88	0.3/5
Rose Ceremony: Brian gave his rose to Parisa, Andrew gave his rose to Alexe, Jeremy gave his rose to Bailey, Spencer gave his rose to Jess, Dale gave his rose to Kat, Sean gave his rose to Allyshia, Jonathon gave his rose to Lea, Keith gave his rose to Kathy, Kim gave his rose to Faith, and Gary gave his rose to Leslie. April, Nancy, and Natascha did not receive a rose and were sent home. Compatibility Challenge Winners: Jeremy & Bailey; Compatibility Challenge Bottom 3: Brian & Parisa, Gary & Leslie, Kim & Faith; Rose Ceremony: Bailey gave her rose to Jeremy, Alexe gave her rose to Andrew, Kathy gave her rose to Keith, Allyshia gave her rose to Sean, Kat gave her rose to Dale, Jess gave her rose to Spencer, and Lea gave her rose to Jonathon. As the winners of the challenge, Bailey & Jeremy chose to give the two remaining roses to Faith and Parisa, who offered them to Kim and Brian respectively. Gary and Leslie did not receive a rose and were sent home.
107	7	"Episode 7"	August 11, 2025	1007	2.04	0.3/6
Compatibility Challenge Winners: Jonathon & Lea; Rose Ceremony: Jonathon gave his rose to Lea, Spencer gave his rose to Jess, Andrew gave his rose to Alexe, Dale gave his rose to Kat, Sean gave his rose to Allyshia, Jeremy gave his rose to Bailey, Keith gave his rose to Kathy, and Brian gave his rose to Parisa. As there were only 8 roses available, the contestants voted for which man would not get a rose to hand out. Kim got the most votes, so he and Faith did not receive a rose and were sent home.
108	8	"Episode 8"	August 18, 2025	1008	1.98	0.3/5
Compatibility Challenge Winners: Spencer & Jess; Rose Ceremony: Jess gave her rose to Spencer, Alexe gave her rose to Andrew, Bailey gave her rose to Jeremy, Kat gave her rose to Dale, Kathy gave her rose to Keith, and Lea gave her rose to Jonathon. As there were only 6 roses available, the contestants voted for which 2 women would not get a rose to hand out. Allyshia and Parisa got the most votes, but Allyshia and Sean chose to leave before the final rose was announced. Parisa and Brian also did not receive a rose and were sent home.
109	9	"Episode 9"	August 25, 2025	1009	1.93	0.3/5
Compatibility Challenge Winners: Dale & Kat; Rose Ceremony: Dale gave his rose to Kat, Andrew gave his rose to Alexe, Spencer gave his rose to Jess, and Jeremy gave his rose to Bailey. As there were only 5 roses available, the contestants voted for which man would not get a rose to hand out. Jonathon and Keith tied for the most votes, so as the winner of the challenge, Dale cast the deciding vote. He chose to offer the final rose to Keith, who then gave it to Kathy. Jonathon and Lea did not receive a rose and were sent home. Compatibility Challenge Winners: Andrew & Alexe
110	10	"Season Finale"	September 2, 2025	1010	1.78	0.2/4
Rose Ceremony: Alexe gave her rose to Andrew, Jess gave her rose to Spencer, and Kat gave her rose to Dale. As there were only 3roses available, the contestants voted for which 2 women would not get a rose to hand out. Bailey and Kathy got the most votes, so they and their partners Jeremy and Keith did not get a rose and were sent home. Compatibility Challenge Winners: Andrew & Alexe; Jury Vote: The eliminated contestants returned to vote which couple deserved to be in the final alongside Andrew & Alexe. Spencer & Jess received the most votes, so Dale & Kat were eliminated. Commitment Ceremony #1 Andrew & Alexe won $125,000. They left Costa Rica as a couple. Commitment Ceremony #2 Spencer & Jess won $190,000. Spencer proposed to Jess and they left Costa Rica as an engaged couple.
