= The Bachelorette (American TV series) season 21 =

The Bachelorette
- Season 21
- Promotional poster
- Starring: Jenn Tran
- Presented by: Jesse Palmer
- No. of contestants: 25
- No. of episodes: 10

Release
- Original network: ABC
- Original release: July 8 – September 3, 2024

Additional information
- Filming dates: March 28 – May 16, 2024

Season chronology
- ← Previous; Season 20 Next → Season 22

The twenty-first season of The Bachelorette premiered on July 8, 2024. This season features 26-year-old Jennifer "Jenn" Tran, a physician assistant student from Hillsdale, New Jersey.

Tran finished in fifth place on the 28th season of The Bachelor featuring Joey Graziadei. She is the first Asian-American and the first practicing Buddhist in the lead role in the history of the Bachelor franchise.

The season concluded on September 3, 2024, with Tran and her final choice, 28-year-old freight company owner Devin Strader, proposing to each other. However, during the live After the Final Rose special, Tran revealed that Strader broke up with her in August 2024.

It is the most recent season of The Bachelorette that has been aired following the subsequent twenty-second season was pulled out from airing on March 19, 2026, less than two years after this season aired.

== Production ==
=== Casting and contestants ===
On March 25, 2024, Tran was announced as the Bachelorette by previous lead Charity Lawson during the After the Final Rose special of the 28th season of The Bachelor. Her fellow season 28 castmates Daisy Kent and Maria Georgas were also considered for the role.

Notable contestants include Aaron Erb, who is the twin brother of season 16 and Bachelor in Paradise 7 contestant Noah Erb, and Caleb "Moze" Smith, who played for the Iowa Barnstormers in the Indoor Football League.

=== Filming and development ===
Filming began on March 28, 2024, at the Hummingbird Nest Ranch in Santa Susana, California. This was previously the filming location for The Bachelor Presents: Listen to Your Heart, making this is the first season since season 18 that did not start at the traditional Bachelor mansion in Agoura Hills, California. In April 2024, filming was reported at Chihuly Garden and Glass, Pike Place Market, Pioneer Square, and Space Needle in Seattle, Washington.

This season also includes visits to Melbourne, Australia and Auckland, New Zealand, with filming concluding in Kailua-Kona, Hawaii in mid-May.

The Bachelorette Australia season 6 co-leads Becky and Elly Miles, professional rugby players Caleb Clarke, Ofa Tuʻungafasi, and Stacey Fluhler, former Bachelorettes Trista Rehn and Charity Lawson, Tran's Bachelor season 28 castmates Daisy Kent and Kelsey Anderson, and Bachelor season 13 couple Jason and Molly Mesnick made guest appearances this season.

== Contestants ==
28 potential contestants were revealed on March 26, 2024.

The final cast of 25 men was announced on June 3, 2024.

In week 4, Tran's ex-boyfriend Matt Rossi asked to join the cast, but she declined.

Name	Age	Hometown	Occupation	Outcome	Place	Ref
Devin Strader	28	Rosenberg, Texas	Freight Company Owner	Winner	1	
Marcus Shoberg	31	Cloquet, Minnesota	Army Ranger Veteran	Runner-Up	2	
Jonathon Johnson	27	Kansas City, Missouri	Creative Director	Week 8	3	
Jeremy Simon	29	Fairfield, Connecticut	Real Estate Investor	Week 7	4	
Grant Ellis	30	Newark, New Jersey	Day Trader	Week 6	5–6	
Spencer Conley	30	Dallas, Texas	Pet Portrait Entrepreneur	Week 6	5–6	
Sam McKinney	27	Myrtle Beach, South Carolina	Contractor	Week 6	7	
Dylan Buckor	24	Elk Grove, California	Medical Student	Week 5	8	
Austin Ott	28	Vista, California	Sales Executive	Week 5	9 (quit)	
John Mitchell	26	Delray Beach, Florida	Medical Student	Week 4	10–11	
Thomas Nguyen	31	Tucker, Georgia	Retirement Adviser	Week 4	10–11	
Samaun "Sam" Nejad	25	Carlsbad, California	Entrepreneur	Week 4	12	
Hakeem Moulton	29	Schaumburg, Illinois	Medical Device Salesman	Week 3	13–14	
Tomas Azzano	27	Toronto, Ontario	Physiotherapist	Week 3	13–14	
Aaron Erb	29	Tulsa, Oklahoma	Aerospace Engineer	Week 3	15 (quit)	
Brian Autz	33	Northport, New York	Aesthetics Consultant	Week 2	16–18	
Jahaan Ansari	28	Newbury Park, California	Startup Founder	Week 2	16–18	
Marvin Goodly	28	Orangeburg, South Carolina	Luxury Event Planner	Week 2	16–18	
Brendan Barnum	30	Vancouver, British Columbia	Real Estate Broker	Week 1	19–25	
Brett Harris	28	Manheim, Pennsylvania	Health & Safety Manager	Week 1	19–25	
Caleb "Moze" Smith	25	Albany, New York	Algebra Teacher	Week 1	19–25	
Dakota Nobles	27	Paradise Valley, Arizona	Sommelier	Week 1	19–25	
Kevin McDevitt	35	Durango, Colorado	Financial Analyst	Week 1	19–25	
Matt Arnold	27	Louisville, Kentucky	Insurance Executive	Week 1	19–25	
Ricky Marinez	28	Miami, Florida	Pharmaceutical Representative	Week 1	19–25	

=== Future appearances ===
==== The Bachelor ====
Grant Ellis was announced as the lead for season 29 of The Bachelor immediately after his elimination aired.

==== Bachelor in Paradise ====
Season 10

Brian Autz, Hakeem Moulton, Jeremy Simon, Jonathon Johnson, Ricky Marinez, Sam McKinney, and Spencer Conley returned for season 10 of Bachelor in Paradise. Moulton, Marinez, and McKinney were eliminated in week 1. Autz was eliminated and left as a couple with Parisa Shifteh in Week 7. Johnson was eliminated with Lea Cayanan in Week 8. Simon was eliminated and left as a couple with Bailey Brown in Week 9. Conley won $190,000 and proposed to Jess Edwards in the finale.

==== Dancing with the Stars ====
Jenn Tran participated in season 33 of Dancing with the Stars, partnering with Sasha Farber. They finished in 7th place.

== Call-out order ==
Order	Bachelors	Week								
Order	Bachelors	1	2	3	4	5	6	7	8	9
1	Marcus	Sam M.	Grant	Spencer	Sam M.	Jonathon	Marcus	Devin	Devin	Devin
2	Marvin	Dylan	Marcus	Devin	Marcus	Grant	Jeremy	Jonathon	Marcus	Marcus
3	Sam N.	Thomas N.	Dylan	Jeremy	Devin	Sam M.	Devin	Marcus	Jonathon	
4	Grant	Spencer	Austin	Marcus	Grant	Devin	Jonathon	Jeremy		
5	Sam M.	Grant	Hakeem	John	Jeremy	Marcus	Grant; Spencer			
6	Thomas N.	Marcus	Spencer	Jonathon	Jonathon	Jeremy	Grant; Spencer			
7	Brendan	Tomas A.	Jeremy	Austin	Spencer	Spencer	Sam M.			
8	Dakota	John	Jonathon	Grant	Dylan	Dylan				
9	Kevin	Jeremy	John	Sam M.	Austin	Austin				
10	Spencer	Devin	Tomas A.	Thomas N.	John; Thomas N.					
11	Brian	Brian	Sam M.	Dylan	John; Thomas N.					
12	Matt	Aaron	Devin	Sam N.	Sam N.					
13	Austin	Jahaan	Sam N.	Hakeem; Tomas A.						
14	Ricky	Hakeem	Aaron	Hakeem; Tomas A.						
15	Tomas A.	Jonathon	Thomas N.	Aaron						
16	Jonathon	Austin	Brian; Jahaan; Marvin							
17	Aaron	Marvin	Brian; Jahaan; Marvin							
18	Jeremy	Sam N.	Brian; Jahaan; Marvin							
19	Dylan	Brendan; Brett; Dakota; Kevin; Matt; Moze; Ricky								
20	John	Brendan; Brett; Dakota; Kevin; Matt; Moze; Ricky								
21	Brett	Brendan; Brett; Dakota; Kevin; Matt; Moze; Ricky								
22	Moze	Brendan; Brett; Dakota; Kevin; Matt; Moze; Ricky								
23	Jahaan	Brendan; Brett; Dakota; Kevin; Matt; Moze; Ricky								
24	Devin	Brendan; Brett; Dakota; Kevin; Matt; Moze; Ricky								
25	Hakeem	Brendan; Brett; Dakota; Kevin; Matt; Moze; Ricky								

The contestant received the first impression rose
The contestant received a rose during a date
The contestant was eliminated
The contestant was eliminated during a date
The contestant was eliminated outside the rose ceremony
The contestant quit the competition
The contestant won the competition

== Controversy ==
Two weeks after the finale aired, ABC came under fire after it was reported by blogger Reality Steve that winner Devin Strader had a restraining order filed against him by an ex-girlfriend in 2017 while they attended Louisiana State University, and had subsequently been arrested for violating the order and breaking into the ex-girlfriend’s apartment.

Despite the show’s eligibility requirements stating that no applicants can have had a restraining order entered against them, this was not disclosed by Strader, nor discovered during the background checks conducted by a third party hired by production company Warner Bros. This is the second time that a contestant who had previously faced criminal charges pertaining to violence against women was cast on the show, after Lincoln Adim in season 14.

== Episodes ==
No. overall	No. in season	Title	Original release date	Prod. code	U.S. viewers (millions)	Rating (18–49)
225	1	"Week 1: Season Premiere"	July 8, 2024	2101	2.80	0.5
226	2	"Week 2: Melbourne, Australia"	July 15, 2024	2102	2.38	0.4
227	3	"Week 3: Melbourne, Australia"	July 22, 2024	2103	2.43	0.4
228	4	"Week 4: Auckland, New Zealand"	July 29, 2024 (Note: Week 4 and Week 5 were aired during the 2024 Summer Olympics at the same time.)	2104	2.02	0.3
229	5	"Week 5: Auckland, New Zealand"	August 5, 2024	2105	2.26	0.4
230	6	"Week 6: Seattle"	August 12, 2024	2106	2.56	0.4
231	7	"Week 7: Hometowns"	August 19, 2024	2107	2.31	0.3
232	8	"Week 8: Fantasy Suites"	August 26, 2024	2108	2.61	0.4
233	9	"The Men Tell All"	August 27, 2024	N/A	2.38	0.3
234	10	"Week 9: Season Finale & After the Final Rose"	September 3, 2024	2109	2.88	0.5
