= The Golden Bachelor season 1 =

The Golden Bachelor
- Season 1
- Promotional poster
- Starring: Gerry Turner
- Presented by: Jesse Palmer
- No. of contestants: 22
- Winner: Theresa Nist
- Runner-up: Leslie Fhima
- No. of episodes: 10

Release
- Original network: ABC
- Original release: September 28 – November 30, 2023

Season chronology
- Next → Season 2

The first season of The Golden Bachelor — a spin-off of The Bachelor featuring contestants 60 and over — premiered on September 28, 2023 on ABC.

This season features 72-year-old Gerry Turner, a retired restaurateur and widower from Hudson, Indiana. It concluded on November 30, 2023, with Turner choosing to propose to 70-year-old Theresa Nist. ABC aired the wedding as a live special, The Golden Wedding, on January 4, 2024. They divorced three months later.

== Production ==
=== Filming and development ===
Filming began in August 2023 in Los Angeles, and concluded in Costa Rica.

As a result of the 2023 Hollywood labor disputes, the series aired on Thursday nights followed by the ninth season of Bachelor in Paradise instead of on its originally intended Monday-night scheduling, to fill timeslots left vacant by scripted shows.

=== Casting and contestants ===
Notable contestants included Patty James, mother of season 25 Bachelor Matt James, Renee Halverson-Wright, author and former Chicago Honey Bears cheerleader, and Susan Noles, ex-wife of retired baseball player Dickie Noles. Former Bachelorettes Kaitlyn Bristowe and Trista Sutter, and then-incoming season 28 Bachelor Joey Graziadei all made guest appearances this season.

Concetta "Chippy" Potenza—aunt of comedian and ABC late-night host Jimmy Kimmel—made a cameo as comic relief in the first episode, appearing as a fake "23rd contestant" trying to meet Turner, and sleeping through the rose ceremony.

The day before the finale aired, an exposé was published by The Hollywood Reporter claiming that Turner had been in a long-term, live-in relationship after the death of his wife, contrasting with the persona he presented on the show. Additionally, there were discrepancies regarding his employment.

Joan Vassos, who departed the show due to a family emergency, later became the lead for the first season of The Golden Bachelorette in 2024.

== Contestants ==
The 22 contestants were announced on August 30, 2023.

Name	Age	Hometown	Occupation	Outcome	Place	Ref
Theresa Nist	70	Shrewsbury, New Jersey	Financial Services Professional	Winner	1	
Leslie Fhima	64	Golden Valley, Minnesota	Fitness Instructor	Runner-Up	2	
Faith Martin	61	Benton City, Washington	High School Teacher	Week 6	3	
Ellen Goltzer	71	Delray Beach, Florida	Retired Teacher	Week 5	4–6	
Sandra Mason	75	Doraville, Georgia	Retired Executive Assistant	Week 5	4–6	
Susan Noles	66	Aston, Pennsylvania	Wedding Officiant	Week 5	4–6	
April Kirkwood	65	Port St. Lucie, Florida	Therapist	Week 4	7–8	
Kathy Swarts	70	Austin, Texas	Retired Educational Consultant	Week 4	7–8	
Nancy Hulkower	60	Alexandria, Virginia	Retired Interior Designer	Week 4	9	
Christina Kempton	73	Sierra Madre, California	Retired Purchasing Manager	Week 3	10–11	
Edith Aguirre	60	Downey, California	Retired Realtor	Week 3	10–11	
Joan Vassos	60	Rockville, Maryland	Private School Administrator	Week 3	12 (quit)	
Jeanie Howard	65	Estill Springs, Tennessee	Retired Project Manager	Week 2	13–15	
Natascha Hardee	60	New York City, New York	Pro-Aging Coach & Midlife Speaker	Week 2	13–15	
Peggy Dercole	69	East Haven, Connecticut	Dental Hygienist	Week 2	13–15	
Marina Perera	60	Los Angeles, California	Educator	Week 2	16 (quit)	
Anna Zalk	61	Summit, New Jersey	Retired Nutritionist	Week 1	17–22	
Maria Trice	60	Teaneck, New Jersey	Health & Wellness Director	Week 1	17–22	
Pamela Burns	75	Aurora, Illinois	Retired Salon Owner	Week 1	17–22	
Patty James	70	Raleigh, North Carolina	Retired Real Estate Professional	Week 1	17–22	
Renee Halverson-Wright	67	Middleton, Wisconsin	Author	Week 1	17–22	
Sylvia Robledo	64	Los Angeles, California	Public Affairs Consultant	Week 1	17–22	

=== Future appearances ===
==== The Golden Bachelorette ====
Joan Vassos was the lead of the first season of The Golden Bachelorette, in which she got engaged to Chock Chapple.

==== Bachelor in Paradise ====
Season 10

April Kirkwood, Faith Martin, Kathy Swarts, Leslie Fhima, Nancy Hulkower, and Natascha Hardee appeared on season 10 of Bachelor in Paradise. Hardee, Hulkower, and Kirkwood were eliminated week 4. Fhima was eliminated week 5 alongside Gary Levingston. Martin was eliminated week 6 alongside Kim Buike. Swarts was eliminated week 9 alongside Keith Gordon.

==== Got to Get Out ====
Noles appeared on the first season of the Hulu show Got to Get Out.

== Call-out order ==
Order	Bachelorettes	Week						
Order	Bachelorettes	1	2	3	4	5	6	7/8
1	Edith	Faith	Theresa	Ellen	Sandra	Faith	Leslie	Theresa
2	Ellen	Ellen	Nancy	Kathy	Leslie	Leslie	Theresa	Leslie
3	Sandra	Theresa	Leslie	Faith	Ellen	Theresa	Faith	
4	Leslie	Joan	Joan	Sandra	Faith	Ellen; Sandra; Susan		
5	Marina	Natascha	Edith	Leslie	Susan	Ellen; Sandra; Susan		
6	Christina	Leslie	Ellen	Nancy	Theresa	Ellen; Sandra; Susan		
7	Joan	Christina	Sandra	Susan	April; Kathy			
8	Natascha	Edith	Susan	April	April; Kathy			
9	Peggy	Nancy	Christina	Theresa	Nancy			
10	Pamela	April	Faith	Christina; Edith				
11	Kathy	Sandra	April	Christina; Edith				
12	Nancy	Jeanie	Kathy	Joan				
13	Theresa	Kathy	Jeanie; Natascha; Peggy					
14	April	Marina	Jeanie; Natascha; Peggy					
15	Renee	Peggy	Jeanie; Natascha; Peggy					
16	Maria	Susan	Marina					
17	Anna	Anna; Maria; Pamela; Patty; Renee; Sylvia						
18	Susan	Anna; Maria; Pamela; Patty; Renee; Sylvia						
19	Patty	Anna; Maria; Pamela; Patty; Renee; Sylvia						
20	Sylvia	Anna; Maria; Pamela; Patty; Renee; Sylvia						
21	Jeanie	Anna; Maria; Pamela; Patty; Renee; Sylvia						
22	Faith	Anna; Maria; Pamela; Patty; Renee; Sylvia						

The contestant received the first impression rose
The contestant received a rose during a date
The contestant received a rose outside of a rose ceremony or date
The contestant was eliminated
The contestant was eliminated during a date
The contestant was eliminated outside the rose ceremony
The contestant received a rose during a date but quit the competition
The contestant quit the competition
The contestant won the competition

== Ratings ==
The season premiere of The Golden Bachelor was the highest-rated premiere in the Bachelor franchise since 2021. ABC stated that the premiere had the highest Live+3 viewership of any Bachelor episode since The Bachelorette season 16, the highest key demographic (18–49) viewership in the franchise since a Bachelor in Paradise season 7 episode in 2021, and was the network's most-streamed non-scripted program on Hulu. The season finale was seen by an average of 6.1 million viewers, making it the most-watched episode of the Bachelor franchise since the March 2021 finale of The Bachelor season 25 featuring Matt James.

== Episodes ==
No. overall	No. in season	Title	Original release date	Prod. code	U.S. viewers (millions)	Rating (18–49)
1	1	"Week 1"	September 28, 2023	101	4.36	0.6
2	2	"Week 2"	October 5, 2023	102	4.27	0.6
3	3	"Week 3"	October 12, 2023	103	3.93	0.5
4	4	"Week 4"	October 19, 2023	104	4.09	0.5
5	5	"Week 5"	October 26, 2023	105	4.42	0.5
6	6	"Week 6"	November 2, 2023	106	4.77	0.6
7	7	"The Women Tell All"	November 9, 2023	N/A	4.89	0.5
8	8	"Week 7"	November 16, 2023	107	5.26	0.7
9	9	"Week 8: Finale and After the Final Rose"	November 30, 2023	108	6.09	0.8

=== Special ===
Title	Original release date	U.S. viewers (millions)	Rating (18–49)
"The Golden Wedding"	January 4, 2024	5.21	0.6
