= The Bachelor (American TV series) season 28 =

The Bachelor
- Season 28
- Promotional poster
- Starring: Joey Graziadei
- Presented by: Jesse Palmer
- No. of contestants: 32
- Winner: Kelsey Anderson
- Runner-up: Daisy Kent
- No. of episodes: 11

Release
- Original network: ABC
- Original release: January 22 – March 25, 2024

Additional information
- Filming dates: September 19 – November 12, 2023

Season chronology
- ← Previous; Season 27 Next → Season 29

The twenty-eighth season of The Bachelor premiered on January 22, 2024. This season features 28-year-old Joey Graziadei, a teaching tennis pro from Royersford, Pennsylvania.

Graziadei was the runner-up on the 20th season of The Bachelorette featuring Charity Lawson.

The season concluded on March 25, 2024, with Graziadei choosing to propose to 25-year-old junior project manager Kelsey Anderson.

== Production ==
=== Casting and contestants ===
On August 21, 2023, Graziadei was announced as the Bachelor by Jesse Palmer during the After the Final Rose special of the 20th season of The Bachelorette. He then met his first contestant, Lea.

Notable contestants include Miami Dolphins Cheerleader Samantha Washington, who was crowned Miss Nebraska Teen USA 2017 and is the daughter of retired NFL safety Brian Washington, Marlena Haddad, who was previously an aide for president Donald Trump, and Maria Georgas, who appeared in the 2005 Disney movie The Pacifier as one of the fireflies girl scouts.

=== Filming and development ===
Much like the previous season, there was a three-week delay from its standard first week of January start to avoid a potential clash with ABC's coverage of Monday Night Football.

Filming began on September 19, 2023, in Agoura Hills, California. In October 2023, filming was reported at the Fairmont Jasper Park Lodge in Jasper, Alberta. This was previously set to be the filming location of season 17 of The Bachelorette in February 2021, but the season was relocated due to travel restrictions enforced by the Canadian government as a result of the COVID-19 pandemic.

This season also includes visits to Mdina, Malta; Marbella, Spain; and Montreal, Quebec, with filming concluding in Tulum, Mexico in mid-November.

Musicians Michael Bolton, Bahamas, and Feist; former contestants Demi Burnett and Jubilee Sharpe; The Golden Bachelor contestants April Kirkwood, Kathy Swarts, Leslie Fhima, Nancy Hulkower, Sandra Mason, and Susan Noles; and retired professional tennis players James Blake and Pam Shriver made guest appearances this season.

== Contestants ==
32 potential contestants, including a set of sisters, were revealed on September 16, 2023.

The final cast was announced on December 20, 2023. Unlike previous seasons, there were no cuts prior to the start of the filming, and all 32 women made it into the final cast.

| Name | Age | Hometown | Occupation | Outcome | Place | Ref |
|---|---|---|---|---|---|---|
| Kelsey Anderson | 25 | Leesville, Louisiana | Junior Project Manager | Winner | 1 | |
| Daisy Kent | 25 | Becker, Minnesota | Account Executive | Week 10 | 2 (quit) | |
| Rachel Nance | 26 | Honolulu, Hawaii | ICU Nurse | Week 9 | 3 | |
| Maria Georgas | 29 | Kleinburg, Ontario | Executive Assistant | Week 8 | 4 | |
| Jennifer "Jenn" Tran | 25 | Hillsdale, New Jersey | PA Student | Week 7 | 5-6 | |
| Kelsey Toussant | 31 | Inglewood, California | Actress | Week 7 | 5-6 | |
| Katelyn DeBacker | 26 | Santa Fe, New Mexico | Radiochemist | Week 6 | 7-8 | |
| Lea Cayanan | 23 | Waipahu, Hawaii | Account Manager | Week 6 | 7-8 | |
| Lexi Young | 30 | Pataskala, Ohio | Digital Strategist | Week 6 | 9 (quit) | |
| Jessica "Jess" Edwards | 24 | Erwin, Tennessee | Executive Assistant | Week 6 | 10 | |
| Autumn Waggoner | 26 | De Soto, Missouri | Account Executive | Week 5 | 11–12 | |
| Madina Alam | 31 | Charlotte, North Carolina | Mental Health Therapist | Week 5 | 11–12 | |
| Allison Hollinger (Note: Allison and Lauren are sisters. They competed individually.) | 26 | Dover, Delaware | Realtor | Week 4 | 13–14 | |
| Edwina Dorbor | 25 | Maple Grove, Minnesota | Entrepreneur | Week 4 | 13–14 | |
| Sydney Gordon | 28 | Newport, Rhode Island | Vintage Store Owner | Week 4 | 15 | |
| Chrissa Perez | 26 | Abbotsford, British Columbia | Marketing Director | Week 3 | 16–18 | |
| Evalin Clark | 29 | San Antonio, Texas | Nanny | Week 3 | 16–18 | |
| Starr Skyler | 25 | Delray Beach, Florida | Mental Health Counselor | Week 3 | 16–18 | |
| Erika Cardenas | 25 | North Bergen, New Jersey | Leasing Agent | Week 2 | 19–21 | |
| Marlena Haddad | 26 | Waterbury, Connecticut | Finance Writer | Week 2 | 19–21 | |
| Taylor Wiens | 23 | Olathe, Kansas | Recruiter | Week 2 | 19–21 | |
| Lauren Hollinger | 28 | Dover, Delaware | Registered Nurse | Week 2 | 22 (quit) | |
| Chandler Dewgard | 24 | Brooklyn, New York | Graphic Designer | Week 1 | 23–32 | |
| Kayla Rodgers | 27 | Hamilton, Ohio | Guidance Counselor | Week 1 | 23–32 | |
| Kyra Brusch | 26 | Miami, Florida | Paralegal | Week 1 | 23–32 | |
| Lanie Latsios | 27 | Glen Mills, Pennsylvania | Realtor | Week 1 | 23–32 | |
| Natalie "Nat" Crepeau | 26 | Sudbury, Ontario | Nursing Professor | Week 1 | 23–32 | |
| Samantha "Sam" Hale | 31 | Melville, New York | CPA | Week 1 | 23–32 | |
| Samantha Washington | 25 | Lincoln, Nebraska | Miami Dolphins Cheerleader | Week 1 | 23–32 | |
| Sandra Rabadi | 26 | Strongsville, Ohio | Cybersecurity Consultant | Week 1 | 23–32 | |
| Talyah Jackson | 23 | Huntington Beach, California | Esthetician | Week 1 | 23–32 | |
| Zoe Antona | 24 | Roswell, Georgia | Artist | Week 1 | 23–32 | |

=== Future appearances ===
==== The Bachelorette ====
Jenn Tran was chosen as the lead for season 21 of The Bachelorette.

==== Bachelor in Paradise ====
Season 10

Jess Edwards, Lea Cayanan and Lexi Young returned for season 10 of Bachelor in Paradise. Young quit in week 2. Cayanan was eliminated alongside Jonathon Johnson in Week 8. Edwards won $190,000 and became engaged to Spencer Conley in the finale.

==== Dancing with the Stars ====
Graziadei and Tran competed in season 33 of Dancing with the Stars, partnering with Jenna Johnson and Sasha Farber, respectively. Tran finished in 7th place, and Graziadei was the winner.

==== The Traitors ====
In 2026, Graziadei competed on the sixth season of The Traitors.

==== The Mob ====
In 2026, Maria Georgas competed in the Hulu show The Mob.

== Call-out order ==
| Order | Bachelorettes | Week | | | | | | | | | |
| Order | Bachelorettes | 1 | 2 | 3 | 4 | 5 | 6 | 7 | 8 | 9 | 10 |
|---|---|---|---|---|---|---|---|---|---|---|---|
| 1 | Lexi | Lea | Jess | Kelsey A. | Lexi | Kelsey A. | Jenn | Daisy | Daisy | Daisy | Kelsey A. |
| 2 | Rachel | Allison | Daisy | Jenn | Kelsey T. | Maria | Kelsey T. | Kelsey A. | Kelsey A. | Kelsey A. | Daisy |
| 3 | Maria | Daisy | Edwina | Katelyn | Maria | Rachel | Maria | Rachel | Rachel | Rachel | |
| 4 | Erika | Kelsey T. | Rachel | Lexi | Kelsey A. | Jenn | Daisy | Maria | Maria | | |
| 5 | Autumn | Lexi | Lexi | Lea | Katelyn | Kelsey T. | Kelsey A. | Jenn; Kelsey T. | | | |
| 6 | Kelsey A. | Jess | Kelsey A. | Kelsey T. | Daisy | Daisy | Rachel | Jenn; Kelsey T. | | | |
| 7 | Chrissa | Jenn | Kelsey T. | Rachel | Rachel | Lea | Katelyn; Lea | | | | |
| 8 | Chandler | Autumn | Jenn | Madina | Jenn | Lexi | Katelyn; Lea | | | | |
| 9 | Marlena | Chrissa | Evalin | Daisy | Autumn | Katelyn | Lexi | | | | |
| 10 | Starr | Edwina | Autumn | Jess | Jess | Jess | Jess | | | | |
| 11 | Talyah | Kelsey A. | Madina | Edwina | Madina | Autumn; Madina | | | | | |
| 12 | Nat | Katelyn | Lea | Autumn | Lea | Autumn; Madina | | | | | |
| 13 | Sandra | Rachel | Katelyn | Allison | Allison; Edwina | | | | | | |
| 14 | Sam | Erika | Chrissa | Maria | Allison; Edwina | | | | | | |
| 15 | Allison | Madina | Maria | Sydney | Sydney | | | | | | |
| 16 | Lauren | Sydney | Starr | Chrissa; Evalin; Starr | | | | | | | |
| 17 | Katelyn | Starr | Allison | Chrissa; Evalin; Starr | | | | | | | |
| 18 | Kelsey T. | Marlena | Sydney | Chrissa; Evalin; Starr | | | | | | | |
| 19 | Jenn | Maria | Erika; Marlena; Taylor | | | | | | | | |
| 20 | Jess | Taylor | Erika; Marlena; Taylor | | | | | | | | |
| 21 | Lanie | Evalin | Erika; Marlena; Taylor | | | | | | | | |
| 22 | Edwina | Lauren | Lauren | | | | | | | | |
| 23 | Samantha | Chandler; Kayla; Kyra; Lanie; Nat; Sam; Samantha; Sandra; Talyah; Zoe | | | | | | | | | |
| 24 | Taylor | Chandler; Kayla; Kyra; Lanie; Nat; Sam; Samantha; Sandra; Talyah; Zoe | | | | | | | | | |
| 25 | Kyra | Chandler; Kayla; Kyra; Lanie; Nat; Sam; Samantha; Sandra; Talyah; Zoe | | | | | | | | | |
| 26 | Zoe | Chandler; Kayla; Kyra; Lanie; Nat; Sam; Samantha; Sandra; Talyah; Zoe | | | | | | | | | |
| 27 | Kayla | Chandler; Kayla; Kyra; Lanie; Nat; Sam; Samantha; Sandra; Talyah; Zoe | | | | | | | | | |
| 28 | Evalin | Chandler; Kayla; Kyra; Lanie; Nat; Sam; Samantha; Sandra; Talyah; Zoe | | | | | | | | | |
| 29 | Sydney | Chandler; Kayla; Kyra; Lanie; Nat; Sam; Samantha; Sandra; Talyah; Zoe | | | | | | | | | |
| 30 | Madina | Chandler; Kayla; Kyra; Lanie; Nat; Sam; Samantha; Sandra; Talyah; Zoe | | | | | | | | | |
| 31 | Daisy | Chandler; Kayla; Kyra; Lanie; Nat; Sam; Samantha; Sandra; Talyah; Zoe | | | | | | | | | |
| 32 | Lea | Chandler; Kayla; Kyra; Lanie; Nat; Sam; Samantha; Sandra; Talyah; Zoe | | | | | | | | | |

The contestant received the first impression rose
The contestant received a rose during a date
The contestant received a rose outside of a rose ceremony or date
The contestant was eliminated
The contestant was eliminated during a date
The contestant was eliminated outside the rose ceremony
The contestant quit the competition
The contestant won the competition

== Episodes ==
| No. overall | No. in season | Title | Original release date | Prod. code | U.S. viewers (millions) | Rating (18–49) |
|---|---|---|---|---|---|---|
| 287 | 1 | "Week 1: Season Premiere" | January 22, 2024 | 2801 | 3.18 | 0.5 |
| 288 | 2 | "Week 2" | January 29, 2024 | 2802 | 3.16 | 0.6 |
| 289 | 3 | "Week 3" | February 5, 2024 | 2803 | 3.22 | 0.6 |
| 290 | 4 | "Week 4: Malta" | February 12, 2024 | 2804 | 3.49 | 0.6 |
| 291 | 5 | "Week 5: Marbella" | February 13, 2024 | 2805 | 3.21 | 0.6 |
| 292 | 6 | "Week 6: Montreal" | February 19, 2024 | 2806 | 3.43 | 0.6 |
| 293 | 7 | "Week 7: Jasper" | February 26, 2024 | 2807 | 3.60 | 0.6 |
| 294 | 8 | "Week 8: Hometowns" | March 4, 2024 | 2808 | 3.62 | 0.7 |
| 295 | 9 | "Week 9: Fantasy Suites" | March 11, 2024 | 2809 | 3.79 | 0.7 |
| 296 | 10 | "The Women Tell All" | March 18, 2024 | N/A | 3.43 | 0.6 |
| 297 | 11 | "Week 10: Season Finale & After the Final Rose" | March 25, 2024 | 2810 | 4.14 | 0.8 |
