= Daisy Kent =

American television personality

- Born: Daisy Kathryn Rae Kent; September 8, 1998 (age 27); Becker, Minnesota, US
- Education: San Diego State University (BA)
- Occupations: Television personality Children’s book author
- Years active: 2023–present

Daisy Kathryn Rae Kent (born September 8, 1998) is an American television personality, children’s book author, and hearing loss activist who rose to national prominence as a contestant on season 28 of The Bachelor.

== Early life and education ==
Kent was born and raised in Becker, Minnesota, to parents Brandon and Julie. She is the middle of five children, and graduated from Becker High School in 2017.

Throughout her childhood, Kent began to suffer from an array of medical issues, including hearing loss, seizures, fatigue, and migraines. In sixth grade, she was diagnosed with epilepsy – however, this was later confirmed to be a misdiagnosis, and she instead was diagnosed with Ménière's disease.

While studying at San Diego State University, she was diagnosed with Lyme disease as a result of a tick bite from when she was younger. She graduated from San Diego State in 2021 with a degree in communications and digital media.

== Career ==
Prior to appearing on The Bachelor, Kent was working as an account executive at a software company in San Diego, California.

In August 2023, she published her first children’s book, Daisy Doo: All The Sounds She Knew, about a young girl learning to hear again after receiving a cochlear implant.

=== Reality television ===
==== The Bachelor ====
In September 2023, Kent was revealed to be a contestant on season 28 of The Bachelor starring Joey Graziadei. She made it to the final two, but eliminated herself after “she knew Kelsey was the one.” She was offered the position of The Bachelorette, but turned it down to focus on her health. The role instead went to her castmate Jenn Tran from season 28.

== Personal life ==
In March 2023, Kent made the decision to have cochlear implant surgery at UC San Diego Health, and began to document her journey on the social media website TikTok. As a result of this, she began to grow a large following, with over 12 million views on the video of her cochlear implant activation. She then used her platform to launch a non-profit organization, Hear Your Heart, which helps patients pay for cochlear implant surgery.

Kent began dating Thor Herbst in the spring of 2024. Kent and Herbst were engaged in Tuscany in October 2025.

| Preceded by Gabi Elnicki | The Bachelor runner up Season 28 | Succeeded by Incumbent |
