= The Golden Bachelor season 2 =

The Golden Bachelor
- Season 2
- Promotional poster
- Starring: Mel Owens
- Presented by: Jesse Palmer
- No. of contestants: 23
- Winner: Peg Munson
- Runner-up: Cindy Cullers
- No. of episodes: 9

Release
- Original network: ABC
- Original release: September 24 – November 12, 2025

Season chronology
- ← Previous; Season 1

The second season of The Golden Bachelor premiered on September 24, 2025 on ABC.

This season features 66-year-old Mel Owens, a lawyer and retired NFL linebacker from Laguna Hills, California. It concluded on November 12, 2025, with Owens offering a promise ring to 62-year-old Peg Munson.

== Production ==
=== Casting and contestants ===
Owens was announced as the second Golden Bachelor on April 22, 2025, during Hulu's inaugural Get Real House event.

Notable contestants include Andra Wicks, who is the twin sister of season 1 contestant Sandra Mason; Carol Freeman-Branstine, who is the aunt and manager of baseball player Freddie Freeman and mother of professional tennis player Carson Branstine; Debbie Siebers, who was a fitness coach on reality show The Swan in 2004, and Lily Reeves, who is the sister of Rita Wilson and mother of Claim to Fame contestant Carly Reeves.

Dancer and choreographer Paula Abdul, comedian Jared Freid, chef Ludo Lefebvre, season 1 contestants Sandra Mason, Kathy Swarts, and Susan Noles, and musicians KC and the Sunshine Band made guest appearances this season.

=== Filming and development ===
Owens faced controversy in June 2025 over comments he made about his potential cast, stating that he would cut any women aged over 60 and did not want to date women with wigs or artificial hips.

While it was rumored that Owens would be replaced as lead due to the backlash, filming ultimately commenced as planned in July 2025 in Los Angeles, and concluded in Antigua in August. Owens later issued an apology for his comments.

== Contestants ==
25 potential contestants were revealed on July 19, 2025.

The final cast of 23 women was announced on September 4, 2025.

| Name | Age | Hometown | Occupation | Outcome | Place | Ref |
|---|---|---|---|---|---|---|
| Peg Munson | 62 | Las Vegas, Nevada | Retired Firefighter and Bomb Tech | Winner | 1 | |
| Cindy Cullers | 60 | Austin, Texas | Retired Biomedical Engineer | Runner-Up | 2 (quit) | |
| Debbie Siebers | 65 | Little Chute, Wisconsin | Fitness Professional | Week 6 | 3 | |
| Cheryl Steele | 66 | Lakewood, Colorado | Retired IRS Worker | Week 5 | 4–5 | |
| Nicolle Briscoe | 64 | Miami Beach, Florida | Yoga Instructor | Week 5 | 4–5 | |
| Carol Freeman-Branstine | 63 | Villa Park, California | Baseball Family Manager | Week 5 | 6 (quit) | |
| Gerri Flowers | 64 | Rockville, Maryland | Home Care Agency CEO | Week 4 | 7–9 | |
| Robin Rocha | 63 | Napa Valley, California | Wealth Advisor/Vineyard Owner | Week 4 | 7–9 | |
| Roxanne Massey | 62 | Austin, Texas | Longevity Nurse | Week 4 | 7–9 | |
| Amy Kaplan | 63 | Short Hills, New Jersey | Momager | Week 3 | 10–13 | |
| Monica Brewer | 62 | Huntsville, Alabama | Flight Attendant | Week 3 | 10–13 | |
| Monica Parham | 60 | Amory, Mississippi | Cosmetic Dentist | Week 3 | 10–13 | |
| Terri Alani | 71 | Houston, Texas | Cosmetic Dentist | Week 3 | 10–13 | |
| Alexandra Tovar | 67 | Miami, Florida | Luxury Yacht Sales Representative | Week 2 | 14–17 | |
| Carla Kemp | 62 | Los Angeles, California | Former Model | Week 2 | 14–17 | |
| Diane Firmani | 71 | Wasilla, Alaska | Librarian | Week 2 | 14–17 | |
| Mylene Vasilescu | 61 | Las Vegas, Nevada | Casino VIP Host | Week 2 | 14–17 | |
| Andra Wicks | 77 | San Francisco, California | Retired Federal Worker | Week 1 | 18–23 | |
| Lily Reeves | 72 | Pacific Palisades, California | Retired Elementary School Teacher | Week 1 | 18–23 | |
| Lisa Flaherty | 66 | Marion, Ohio | State Park Employee | Week 1 | 18–23 | |
| Maia Dreyer | 58 | Malibu, California | College Sports Consultant | Week 1 | 18–23 | |
| Susie Lampe | 62 | Del Mar, California | Realtor | Week 1 | 18–23 | |
| Tracy Thompson | 62 | Lafayette, Louisiana | Interior Designer | Week 1 | 18–23 | |

== Call-out order ==
| Order | Bachelorettes | Week | | | | | | |
| Order | Bachelorettes | 1 | 2 | 3 | 4 | 5 | 6 | 7/8 |
|---|---|---|---|---|---|---|---|---|
| 1 | Cindy | Gerri | Cheryl | Nicolle | Peg | Cindy | Peg | Peg |
| 2 | Carol | Peg | Cindy | Debbie | Carol | Peg | Cindy | Cindy |
| 3 | Diane | Carla | Roxanne | Cindy | Debbie | Debbie | Debbie | |
| 4 | Terri | Terri | Debbie | Peg | Cindy | Cheryl; Nicolle | | |
| 5 | Carla | Cheryl | Gerri | Roxanne | Cheryl | Cheryl; Nicolle | | |
| 6 | Alexandra | Nicolle | Monica P. | Gerri | Nicolle | Carol | | |
| 7 | Debbie | Cindy | Monica B. | Cheryl | Gerri; Robin; Roxanne | | | |
| 8 | Peg | Amy | Carol | Robin | Gerri; Robin; Roxanne | | | |
| 9 | Gerri | Alexandra | Peg | Carol | Gerri; Robin; Roxanne | | | |
| 10 | Lisa | Monica P. | Nicolle | Amy; Monica B. Monica P. Terri | | | | |
| 11 | Maia | Mylene | Robin | Amy; Monica B. Monica P. Terri | | | | |
| 12 | Nicolle | Carol | Amy | Amy; Monica B. Monica P. Terri | | | | |
| 13 | Monica P. | Roxanne | Terri | Amy; Monica B. Monica P. Terri | | | | |
| 14 | Robin | Monica B. | Alexandra; Carla; Diane; Mylene | | | | | |
| 15 | Andra | Robin | Alexandra; Carla; Diane; Mylene | | | | | |
| 16 | Amy | Diane | Alexandra; Carla; Diane; Mylene | | | | | |
| 17 | Susie | Debbie | Alexandra; Carla; Diane; Mylene | | | | | |
| 18 | Tracy | Andra; Lily; Lisa; Maia; Susie; Tracy | | | | | | |
| 19 | Monica B. | Andra; Lily; Lisa; Maia; Susie; Tracy | | | | | | |
| 20 | Roxanne | Andra; Lily; Lisa; Maia; Susie; Tracy | | | | | | |
| 21 | Lily | Andra; Lily; Lisa; Maia; Susie; Tracy | | | | | | |
| 22 | Mylene | Andra; Lily; Lisa; Maia; Susie; Tracy | | | | | | |
| 23 | Cheryl | Andra; Lily; Lisa; Maia; Susie; Tracy | | | | | | |

The contestant received the first impression rose
The contestant received a rose during a date
The contestant received a rose outside of a rose ceremony or date
The contestant was eliminated
The contestant was eliminated during a date
The contestant was eliminated outside the rose ceremony
The contestant quit the competition
The contestant won the competition

== Episodes ==
| No. overall | No. in season | Title | Original release date | Prod. code | U.S. viewers (millions) | Rating (18–49) |
|---|---|---|---|---|---|---|
| 10 | 1 | "Week 1: Season Premiere" | September 24, 2025 | 201 | 2.60 | 0.3 |
| 11 | 2 | "Week 2" | September 24, 2025 | 202 | 2.60 | 0.3 |
| 12 | 3 | "Week 3" | October 1, 2025 | 203 | 2.05 | 0.2 |
| 13 | 4 | "Week 4" | October 8, 2025 | 204 | 1.93 | 0.2 |
| 14 | 5 | "Week 5" | October 15, 2025 | 205 | 2.18 | 0.2 |
| 15 | 6 | "Week 6" | October 22, 2025 | 206 | 2.27 | 0.2 |
| 16 | 7 | "The Women Tell All" | October 29, 2025 | N/A | 1.99 | 0.2 |
| 17 | 8 | "Week 7" | November 5, 2025 | 207 | 1.93 | 0.2 |
| 18 | 9 | "Week 8: Finale and After the Final Rose" | November 12, 2025 | 208 | 2.51 | 0.2 |
