= Grant Ellis =

American television personality (born 1993)

- Born: Grant Russell Ellis; December 15, 1993 (age 32); Newark, New Jersey, U.S.
- Education: Albertus Magnus College (BS)
- Occupation: Television personality
- Height: 6 ft 5 in (1.96 m)
- Partner: Juliana Pasquarosa (2024–2025)

Grant Russell Ellis (born December 15, 1993) is an American television personality and former professional basketball player for a team in the Dominican Republic who is best known as a contestant on season 21 of The Bachelorette, and as the star of season 29 of The Bachelor.

== Early life and education ==
Ellis was born and raised in Newark, New Jersey, to parents Robert and Renee. He has a sister, Taylor. He was a star basketball player at Hudson Catholic Regional High School, and received a Division I scholarship to play for the Iona Gaels men's basketball team in 2012. He transferred to Albertus Magnus College after two years and graduated in 2017 with a degree in criminal justice.

== Career ==
After graduating college, Ellis played professional basketball in the Liga Nacional de Baloncesto in the Dominican Republic. After retiring from basketball due to an injury, he moved to Houston, Texas and began a career as a day trader.

=== Reality television ===
==== The Bachelorette ====
In March 2024, Ellis was revealed to be a contestant on season 21 of The Bachelorette starring Jenn Tran. He finished in fifth place, with Tran sending him home at the last rose ceremony before hometowns.

==== The Bachelor ====
On August 12, 2024, immediately after his elimination aired, Ellis was announced as the star of season 29 of The Bachelor.

== Personal life ==
On October 31, 2024, Ellis got engaged to Juliana Pasquarosa, whom he chose as the winner on his season of The Bachelor. They announced their breakup on Friday, June 13, 2025.

== Filmography ==
Year	Title	Role	Notes
2024	The Bachelorette	Himself	Contestant; season 21; fifth place
2025	The Bachelor	Himself	Lead; season 29

Preceded by Joey Graziadei	The Bachelor; Season 29 (2025)	Succeeded by Sam Hartman
