= Dancing with the Stars (American TV series) season 33 =

Dancing with the Stars
- Season 33
- Promotional poster for season 33, featuring hosts Alfonso Ribeiro and Julianne Hough, and the celebrity cast
- Hosted by: Alfonso Ribeiro; Julianne Hough
- Judges: Derek Hough; Carrie Ann Inaba; Bruno Tonioli
- Celebrity winner: Joey Graziadei
- Professional winner: Jenna Johnson
- No. of episodes: 10

Release
- Original network: ABC; Disney+
- Original release: September 17 – November 26, 2024

Season chronology
- ← Previous; Season 32 Next → Season 34

Season thirty-three of Dancing with the Stars premiered on ABC and Disney+ on September 17, 2024, and concluded on November 26, 2024. This season was the second to air live on both networks simultaneously. Season nineteen champion Alfonso Ribeiro hosted the installment, while former professional dancer and judge Julianne Hough returned as co-host.

The Bachelor star Joey Graziadei and Jenna Johnson were crowned the champions, while Olympic rugby player Ilona Maher and Alan Bersten finished in second place, actress and singer Chandler Kinney and Brandon Armstrong finished in third place, Olympic artistic gymnast Stephen Nedoroscik and Rylee Arnold finished in fourth place, and NFL wide receiver Danny Amendola and Witney Carson finished in fifth place.

== Cast ==
=== Couples ===
On August 22, 2024, Stephen Nedoroscik was the first celebrity participant announced for the season. Anna Delvey joined the cast on August 30, as initially reported by Page Six; Deadline Hollywood, The Independent, and Vanity Fair confirmed the report the following day. Although Delvey was under house arrest in East Village, Manhattan and facing deportation at the time, she was granted permission from the U.S. Immigration and Customs Enforcement (ICE) to travel to Los Angeles as her confinement terms were relaxed. Jenn Tran joined the cast immediately following the season 21 finale of The Bachelorette. The full roster of celebrity participants and their partnerships was announced on September 4, via Good Morning America. Nedoroscik and Ilona Maher were the first athletes from their respective disciplines, men's artistic gymnastics and rugby sevens, to compete in the series. Delvey was the first to wear an ankle monitor while competing.

Three days after Lindsay Arnold confirmed that she would not be returning as a professional dancer, Witney Carson announced on Good Morning America that she would return to the lineup after taking the previous season off. Television advertisements for the season featured Emma Slater, Sasha Farber, Daniella Karagach, Pasha Pashkov, Britt Stewart, Alan Bersten, Rylee Arnold, and Brandon Armstrong. Former troupe member Ezra Sosa was promoted to pro, as initially reported by entertainment journalist Kristyn Burtt and later confirmed by GLAAD. He is the first Latino professional dancer to be featured on the series in over a decade.

After originally being scheduled to be in the troupe, Farber was announced as a professional dancer on the Good Morning America cast reveal. He and Tran learned that they would be partnered together approximately 45 minutes before they boarded a flight to New York City. Burtt also shared with Cheryl Burke that Jenna Johnson and the reigning champion Valentin Chmerkovskiy were slated to return; while Koko Iwasaki did not. Peta Murgatroyd chose to take the season off following the birth of her third child. Artem Chigvintsev was not set to be a part of the cast when news broke of his arrest in Napa County, California, for felony domestic violence against his wife, Nikki Garcia.

Cast of Dancing with the Stars (season 33)
Celebrity	Notability	Professional partner	Status	Ref.
Anna Delvey	Con artist	Ezra Sosa	Eliminated 1st & 2nd on September 24, 2024	
Tori Spelling	Film & television actress	Pasha Pashkov	Eliminated 1st & 2nd on September 24, 2024	
Eric Roberts	Film & television actor	Britt Stewart	Eliminated 3rd & 4th on October 8, 2024	
Reginald VelJohnson	Film & television actor	Emma Slater	Eliminated 3rd & 4th on October 8, 2024	
Brooks Nader	Model	Gleb Savchenko	Eliminated 5th on October 15, 2024	
Phaedra Parks	Reality television personality	Val Chmerkovskiy	Eliminated 6th on October 22, 2024	
Jenn Tran	The Bachelorette star	Sasha Farber	Eliminated 7th on October 29, 2024	
Dwight Howard	NBA center	Daniella Karagach	Eliminated 8th on November 12, 2024	
Danny Amendola	NFL wide receiver	Witney Carson	Fifth place on November 26, 2024	
Stephen Nedoroscik	Olympic artistic gymnast	Rylee Arnold	Fourth place on November 26, 2024	
Chandler Kinney	Television actress & singer	Brandon Armstrong	Third place on November 26, 2024	
Ilona Maher	Olympic rugby player	Alan Bersten	Runners-up on November 26, 2024	
Joey Graziadei	The Bachelor star	Jenna Johnson	Winners on November 26, 2024	

=== Hosts and judges ===
Alfonso Ribeiro and Julianne Hough returned for this season. Carrie Ann Inaba, Bruno Tonioli and Derek Hough returned as judges. The two-night special hosted two guest judges; Rosie Perez appeared on Soul Train Night and Gene Simmons appeared on Hair Metal Night. Mark Ballas served as the guest judge for Dedication Night.

=== Dance troupe ===
After being eliminated in the previous season, the dance troupe returned with Marcquet Hill, Roman Nevinchanyi, Kailyn Rogers and Stephani Sosa, older sister of Ezra Sosa, joining the show as first-time troupe members.

== Episodes ==
No. overall	No. in season	Title	Rating (18–49) (Note: Ratings are for ABC viewership, does not include Disney+ viewership.)	Original release date	U.S. viewers (millions)
493	1	"Premiere"	0.73	September 17, 2024	4.97
494	2	"Oscars Night"	0.76	September 24, 2024	4.89
495	3	"Soul Train Night"	0.56	October 7, 2024	3.98
496	4	"Hair Metal Night"	0.62	October 8, 2024	4.51
497	5	"Dedication Night"	0.67	October 15, 2024	4.40
498	6	"Disney Night"	0.72	October 22, 2024	4.85
499	7	"Halloween Nightmares Night"	0.67	October 29, 2024	4.47
500	8	"500th Episode"	0.71	November 12, 2024	5.13
501	9	"Semifinals"	0.75	November 19, 2024	5.19
502	10	"Finale"	1.14	November 26, 2024	6.36

== Scoring chart ==
The highest score each week is indicated in bold green with a dagger (†), while the lowest score each week is indicated in italicized red with a double-dagger (‡).

Color key:

Winners
Runners-up
Third place
Fourth place
Fifth place
Eliminated

Dancing with the Stars (season 33) - Weekly scores
Couple	Pl.	Week												
Couple	Pl.	1	2	1+2	3			4 (Note: The couples were scored on a 40-point scale due to the presence of a guest judge.)	5	6	7	8	9	8+9
Couple	Pl.	1	2	1+2	Night 1	Night 2	1+2	4	5	6	7	8	9	8+9
Joey & Jenna	1st	21	22	43	34	**36**†	**70**†	**36**†	25+27=52	29+3=**32**†	28+27=55	30+28=**58**†	30+29=59	117 (Note: This couple finished in first place.)
Ilona & Alan	2nd	18	21	39	30	26	56	32	25+27=52	24‡	28+24=52	28+29=57	27+30=57	114 (Note: This couple finished in second place.)
Chandler & Brandon	3rd	**23**†	**24**†	**47**†	**36**†	33	69	32	27+27=**54**†	29+3=**32**†	30+30=**60**†	29+29=**58**†	30+30=**60**†	**118**† (Note: This couple finished in third place.)
Stephen & Rylee	4th	21	22	43	30	32	62	33	24+24=48‡	28	29+25=54	25+28=53‡	29+30=59	112 (Note: This couple finished in fourth place.)
Danny & Witney	5th	20	21	41	30	30	60	**36**†	27+24=51	28	27+24=51	27+27=54	27+29=56‡	110‡ (Note: This couple finished in fifth place.)
Dwight & Daniella	6th	22	22	44	23	29	52	29‡	24+24=48‡	28+3=31	26+22=48‡ (Note: This couple was eliminated.)			
Jenn & Sasha	7th	19	19	38	31	31	62	32	24+27=51	28+3=31				
Phaedra & Val	8th	19	21	40	30	26	56	32	24+24=48‡					
Brooks & Gleb	9th	18	20	38	28	33	61	32						
Eric & Britt	10th	15‡	15‡	30‡	24	22	46							
Reginald & Emma	10th	16	15‡	31	21‡	21‡	42‡							
Tori & Pasha	12th	17	19	36										
Anna & Ezra	12th	18	17	35										

== Weekly scores ==
Individual judges' scores in the charts below (given in parentheses) are listed in this order from left to right: Carrie Ann Inaba, Derek Hough, Bruno Tonioli.

=== Week 1: Premiere ===
Each couple performed one unlearned dance to a "personal anthem" of the celebrity. There was no elimination this week; all scores carried over to the following week. The opening number, choreographed by Jamal Sims, was set to "Set My Heart On Fire (I’m Alive x And The Beat Goes On)" by Majestic, the Jammin Kid, and Celine Dion.

Couples are listed in the order they performed.

Dancing with the Stars (season 33) - Week 1
Couple	Scores	Dance	Music
Joey & Jenna	21 (7, 7, 7)	Cha-cha-cha	"Dancin' in the Country" — Tyler Hubbard
Brooks & Gleb	18 (6, 6, 6)	Tango	"Piece of Me" — Britney Spears
Ilona & Alan	18 (6, 6, 6)	Cha-cha-cha	"Man! I Feel Like a Woman!" — Shania Twain
Reginald & Emma	16 (6, 5, 5)	Salsa	"Motownphilly" — Boyz II Men
Danny & Witney	20 (7, 6, 7)	Tango	"A Bar Song (Tipsy)" — Shaboozey & David Guetta
Tori & Pasha	17 (6, 6, 5)	Foxtrot	"Trustfall" — Pink
Jenn & Sasha	19 (7, 6, 6)	Cha-cha-cha	"Flowers" — Miley Cyrus
Chandler & Brandon	23 (8, 7, 8)	Tango	"Hot to Go!" — Chappell Roan
Dwight & Daniella	22 (8, 7, 7)	Salsa	"This Is How We Do It" — Montell Jordan
Eric & Britt	15 (5, 5, 5)	Cha-cha-cha	"Old Time Rock and Roll" — Bob Seger
Phaedra & Val	19 (7, 6, 6)	Cha-cha-cha	"I'm Every Woman" — Whitney Houston
Stephen & Rylee	21 (7, 7, 7)	Jive	"Don't Stop Me Now" — Queen
Anna & Ezra	18 (6, 6, 6)	Cha-cha-cha	"Espresso" — Sabrina Carpenter

=== Week 2: Oscars Night ===
Each couple performed one unlearned dance to a song from an Academy Award-nominated film. A double elimination took place this week. This episode received over 14 million fan votes, the second-highest single-episode total in the show's history. The opening number, choreographed by Alan Bersten and Britt Stewart, was set to "Hooray for Hollywood" by Richard A. Whiting, the Boston Pops Orchestra, and John Williams.

Couples are listed in the order they performed.

Dancing with the Stars (season 33) - Week 2
Couple	Scores	Dance	Music	Film	Result
Jenn & Sasha	19 (6, 6, 7)	Tango	"A Little Party Never Killed Nobody (All We Got)" — Fergie, Q-Tip & GoonRock	The Great Gatsby	Safe
Eric & Britt	15 (6, 4, 5)	Waltz	"The Godfather Waltz" — Nino Rota & Carlo Savina	The Godfather	Safe
Danny & Witney	21 (7, 7, 7)	Jive	"Danger Zone" — Kenny Loggins	Top Gun	Safe
Anna & Ezra	17 (6, 5, 6)	Quickstep	"Suddenly I See" — KT Tunstall	The Devil Wears Prada	Eliminated
Chandler & Brandon	24 (8, 8, 8)	Rumba	"What Was I Made For?" — Billie Eilish	Barbie	Safe
Reginald & Emma	15 (6, 4, 5)	Paso doble	"Ode to Joy" — Ludwig van Beethoven	Die Hard	Safe
Stephen & Rylee	22 (8, 7, 7)	Paso doble	"Superman (Main Theme)" — The City of Prague Philharmonic Orchestra	Superman	Safe
Joey & Jenna	22 (8, 7, 7)	Rumba	"Shallow" — Lady Gaga & Bradley Cooper	A Star Is Born	Safe
Phaedra & Val	21 (7, 7, 7)	Foxtrot	"And I Am Telling You I'm Not Going" — Jennifer Hudson	Dreamgirls	Safe
Tori & Pasha	19 (7, 6, 6)	Rumba	"This Is Me" — Keala Settle & The Greatest Showman Ensemble	The Greatest Showman	Eliminated
Dwight & Daniella	22 (8, 7, 7)	Foxtrot	"City of Stars" — Ryan Gosling	La La Land	Safe
Brooks & Gleb	20 (7, 6, 7)	Quickstep	"9 to 5" — Dolly Parton	9 to 5	Safe
Ilona & Alan	21 (7, 7, 7)	Salsa	"(I've Had) The Time of My Life" — Bill Medley & Jennifer Warnes	Dirty Dancing	Safe

=== Week 3: Two-Night Special ===
As ABC tweaked its programming schedule to avoid conflicts with the U.S. vice presidential debate, held on October 1, 2024, Dancing with the Stars preempted an original episode that was set to air on the same date. It returned for a special two-night event the following week—with a pre-recorded broadcast on October 7 and a live airing on October 8. ABC's decision forced the season premieres of Celebrity Wheel of Fortune, Press Your Luck, and What Would You Do? to be pushed back by one week.

Night 1 (Soul Train Night)

Individual judges' scores in the charts below (given in parentheses) are listed in this order from left to right: Carrie Ann Inaba, Rosie Perez, Derek Hough, Bruno Tonioli.

Each couple performed one unlearned dance to a song that was performed on the musical variety program Soul Train (1971–2006). There was no elimination this night; all scores carried over to the following night. Actress and former Soul Train dancer Rosie Perez appeared as a guest judge. The opening number, choreographed by Luam, was set to "TSOP (The Sound of Philadelphia)" by MFSB and the Three Degrees, and featured guest dancer and Soul Train alum Popin' Pete of the Electric Boogaloos. Derek Hough held a master class on Latin dance styles centered on the song "Get Down on It" by Kool & the Gang.

Couples are listed in the order they performed.

Dancing with the Stars (season 33) - Week 3 (Night 1)
Couple	Scores	Dance	Music
Phaedra & Val	30 (8, 8, 7, 7)	Quickstep	"Think" — Aretha Franklin
Ilona & Alan	30 (8, 8, 7, 7)	Foxtrot	"Lady Marmalade" — Labelle
Eric & Britt	24 (7, 6, 5, 6)	Foxtrot	"Let's Stay Together" — Al Green
Stephen & Rylee	30 (8, 8, 7, 7)	Quickstep	"Superstition" — Stevie Wonder
Brooks & Gleb	28 (7, 7, 7, 7)	Rumba	"Sexual Healing" — Marvin Gaye
Joey & Jenna	34 (9, 9, 8, 8)	Jive	"Shout" — The Isley Brothers
Dwight & Daniella	23 (6, 6, 5, 6)	Cha-cha-cha	"Let's Groove" — Earth, Wind & Fire
Danny & Witney	30 (8, 8, 7, 7)	Foxtrot	"Dancing Machine" — The Jackson 5
Reginald & Emma	21 (6, 5, 5, 5)	Foxtrot	"I Can See Clearly Now" — Johnny Nash
Jenn & Sasha	31 (8, 8, 7, 8)	Viennese waltz	"Fallin'" — Alicia Keys
Chandler & Brandon	36 (9, 9, 9, 9)	Cha-cha-cha	"It's Tricky" — Run-DMC

Night 2 (Hair Metal Night)

Individual judges' scores in the charts below (given in parentheses) are listed in this order from left to right: Carrie Ann Inaba, Derek Hough, Gene Simmons, Bruno Tonioli.

Each couple performed one unlearned dance to a rock anthem. Another double elimination took place this night. This episode received 15 million fan votes, the highest single-episode total in the show's history. Gene Simmons, founding member of Kiss, appeared as a guest judge. He was criticized by viewers for making inappropriate and misogynistic remarks towards the female dancers. The opening number, choreographed by Pasha Pashkov, was set to "Rock and Roll All Nite" by Kiss and featured guitarist Joel Hoekstra from Whitesnake. Hoeksta also performed "Here I Go Again" for Stephen Nedoroscik's foxtrot and "The Final Countdown" for Jenn Tran's paso doble. Derek Hough held a second master class centered around lifts and tricks.

Couples are listed in the order they performed.

Dancing with the Stars (season 33) - Week 3 (Night 2)
Couple	Scores	Dance	Music	Result
Danny & Witney	30 (7, 7, 9, 7)	Paso doble	"Livin' on a Prayer" — Bon Jovi	Safe
Reginald & Emma	21 (6, 5, 5, 5)	Cha-cha-cha	"I Wanna Rock" — Twisted Sister	Eliminated
Chandler & Brandon	33 (8, 8, 9, 8)	Jive	"We're Not Gonna Take It" — Twisted Sister	Safe
Brooks & Gleb	33 (8, 8, 9 (Note: Gene officially submitted a score of 9 to Brooks & Gleb, but inexplicably showed a 10 during the judges' reveal.), 8)	Cha-cha-cha	"Nothin' But a Good Time" — Poison	Safe
Stephen & Rylee	32 (8, 8, 8, 8)	Foxtrot	"Here I Go Again" — Whitesnake	Safe
Dwight & Daniella	29 (8, 7, 7, 7)	Paso doble	"Walk This Way" — Aerosmith	Safe
Eric & Britt	22 (6, 5, 6, 5)	Paso doble	"Cherry Pie" — Warrant	Eliminated
Ilona & Alan	26 (7, 6, 7, 6)	Jive	"Cum On Feel the Noize" — Quiet Riot	Safe
Jenn & Sasha	31 (8, 8, 7, 8)	Paso doble	"The Final Countdown" — Europe	Safe
Phaedra & Val	26 (7, 7, 5, 7)	Paso doble	"You Give Love a Bad Name" — Bon Jovi	Safe
Joey & Jenna	36 (9, 9, 9, 9)	Tango	"Rock You Like a Hurricane" — Scorpions	Safe

=== Week 4: Dedication Night ===
Individual judges' scores in the charts below (given in parentheses) are listed in this order from left to right: Carrie Ann Inaba, Derek Hough, Mark Ballas, Bruno Tonioli.

Each couple performed one unlearned dance to honor the most influential figures and institutions in the celebrities' lives. Three-time mirrorball champion Mark Ballas returned as a guest judge. As the competition neared the halfway point, judges visited the couples during rehearsals this week to assess their progress and offer feedback. Derek Hough and his wife Hayley Erbert performed a contemporary piece to "Beautiful Things (Acoustic)" by Benson Boone to commemorate Erbert's return to the ballroom after she was hospitalized for a cranial hematoma and underwent an emergency craniectomy last year.

Couples are listed in the order they performed.

Dancing with the Stars (season 33) - Week 4
Couple	Scores	Dance	Music	Dedicated to	Result
Chandler & Brandon	32 (8, 8, 8, 8)	Contemporary	"I Hope You Dance" — Lee Ann Womack	Taryn Kinney, Chandler's mother	Safe
Stephen & Rylee	33 (8, 9, 8, 8)	Argentine tango	"Seven Nation Army" — The White Stripes	Men's artistic gymnastics	Safe
Danny & Witney	36 (9, 9, 9, 9)	Contemporary	"Unsteady (Erich Lee Gravity Remix)" — X Ambassadors	Mike Leach, Danny's former football coach	Safe
Dwight & Daniella	29 (7, 8, 7, 7)	Rumba	"Shoot for the Stars" — Dwight Howard	Braylon, Layla, Jayde, Trey, and David Howard, Dwight's children	Safe
Phaedra & Val	32 (8, 8, 8, 8)	Rumba	"Because You Loved Me" — Celine Dion	Regina Bell, Phaedra's mother	Safe
Brooks & Gleb	32 (8, 8, 8, 8)	Salsa	"Mi Gente" — J Balvin & Willy William	Mary Holland, Grace Ann, and Sarah Jane Nader, Brooks' younger sisters	Eliminated
Joey & Jenna	36 (9, 9, 9, 9)	Viennese waltz	"Lose Control" — Teddy Swims	Kelsey Anderson, Joey's fiancée	Safe
Ilona & Alan	32 (8, 8, 8, 8)	Rumba	"My Way" — Yseult	The United States women's national rugby sevens team	Safe
Jenn & Sasha	32 (8, 8, 8, 8)	Foxtrot	"The Archer" — Taylor Swift	Taylor Swift, Jenn's favorite music artist	Safe

=== Week 5: Disney Night ===
Each couple performed one unlearned dance and participated in a team dance to a song from a Disney film. The teams were chosen by the celebrities with the lowest combined scores, Ilona and Dwight. The opening number, choreographed by Mandy Moore, was set to "Friend Like Me" from Aladdin (1992) and featured an appearance from Michael James Scott, who stars as the Genie in its accompanying stage musical. This episode also marked the broadcast premiere of the song "We're Back" from Moana 2 (2024) with a routine by the troupe and eliminated pros, choreographed by Britt Stewart.

Couples are listed in the order they performed.

Dancing with the Stars (season 33) - Week 5
Couple	Scores	Dance	Music	Disney film	Result
Stephen & Rylee	24 (8, 8, 8)	Charleston	"A Star Is Born"	Hercules	Safe
Jenn & Sasha	24 (8, 8, 8)	Rumba	"Kiss the Girl"	The Little Mermaid	Safe
Joey & Jenna	25 (8, 8, 9)	Samba	"Trashin' the Camp"	Tarzan	Safe
Chandler & Brandon	27 (9, 9, 9)	Paso doble	"We Own the Night"	Zombies 2	Safe
Phaedra & Val	24 (8, 8, 8)	Jazz	"Cruella De Vil"	One Hundred and One Dalmatians	Eliminated
Danny & Witney	27 (9, 9, 9)	Jazz	"Bye Bye Bye" ― NSYNC	Deadpool & Wolverine	Safe
Dwight & Daniella	24 (8, 8, 8)	Tango	"When Can I See You Again?"	Wreck-It Ralph	Safe
Ilona & Alan	25 (9, 8, 8)	Jazz	"Surface Pressure"	Encanto	Safe
Danny & Witney Dwight & Daniella Phaedra & Val Stephen & Rylee	24 (8, 8, 8)	Freestyle (Team Roar)	"I Just Can't Wait to Be King"	The Lion King	
Chandler & Brandon Ilona & Alan Jenn & Sasha Joey & Jenna	27 (9, 9, 9)	Freestyle (Team Goofs)	"I 2 I"	A Goofy Movie	

=== Week 6: Halloween Nightmares Night ===
Each couple performed one unlearned dance inspired by the celebrities' biggest fears and darkest nightmares. Six couples also participated in a dance-off, featuring the cha-cha-cha, jive, and salsa, for three extra points. For receiving the highest cumulative points in the season so far, Chandler & Brandon earned immunity from the dance-offs and automatically received three bonus points.

There was three numbers in this episode. The opener, choreographed by Emma Slater and Gleb Savchenko, was set to "Murder on the Dancefloor" by Sophie Ellis-Bextor. Daniella Karagach and Pasha Pashkov choreographed the second number to "Aserejé" by Jean Massey. A third routine, choreographed by Britt Stewart and Ezra Sosa, was performed by the pros and troupe to "The Ballad of Witches' Road (Sacred Chant Version)" from the miniseries Agatha All Along. Derek Hough also held a master class focused on wardrobe tips.

Couples are listed in the order they performed.

Dancing with the Stars (season 33) - Week 6
Couple	Scores	Dance	Music	Result
Ilona & Alan	24 (8, 8, 8)	Tango	"Psycho Killer" — Miley Cyrus	Safe
Dwight & Daniella	28 (10, 9, 9)	Contemporary	"Ring Around the Rosie" — District 78	Safe
Danny & Witney	28 (10, 9, 9)	Argentine tango	"Poison" — RAVN	Safe
Jenn & Sasha	28 (10, 9, 9)	Contemporary	"Vampire" — Olivia Rodrigo	Eliminated
Joey & Jenna	29 (10, 9, 10)	Argentine tango	"Ramalama (Bang Bang)" — Róisín Murphy	Safe
Stephen & Rylee	28 (10, 9, 9)	Contemporary	"I Ran (So Far Away)" — Hidden Citizens	Safe
Chandler & Brandon	29 (9, 10, 10)	Viennese waltz	"Secret" — Denmark + Winter	Safe

Dance-offs
Couple	Dance	Music	Result
Dwight & Daniella	Cha-cha-cha	"Ghostbusters" — Ray Parker Jr.	Winners
Ilona & Alan	Cha-cha-cha	"Ghostbusters" — Ray Parker Jr.	Losers
Jenn & Sasha	Salsa	"Jump in the Line" — Harry Belafonte	Winners
Stephen & Rylee	Salsa	"Jump in the Line" — Harry Belafonte	Losers
Joey & Jenna	Jive	"Time Warp" — Little Nell, Patricia Quinn, & Richard O'Brien	Winners
Danny & Witney	Jive	"Time Warp" — Little Nell, Patricia Quinn, & Richard O'Brien	Losers

=== Week 7: 500th Episode ===
ABC preempted a second original episode of Dancing with the Stars to avoid conflicts with the U.S. presidential election and related elections, all held on November 5, 2024. It returned the following week.

To celebrate the 500th episode of Dancing with the Stars, in the first round, each couple reinterpreted a memorable dance from a previous season. The second round was the Instant Dance Challenge, in which they had approximately five minutes to choreograph and learn a new dance before performing it live. Although the assigned dance styles and songs were not known beforehand by the couples, they were told that it would be one of four dance styles they had performed earlier in the season.

The opening number was choreographed by Pasha Pashkov and Daniella Karagach to "Crazy in Love" by Beyoncé featuring Jay-Z, the same song that opened the first season of Dancing with the Stars. It featured special appearances from Derek Hough, Julianne Hough, and Sharna Burgess.

Couples are listed in the order they performed.

Dancing with the Stars (season 33) - Week 7
Couple	Scores	Dance	Music	Inspiration	Result
Joey & Jenna	28 (9, 10, 9)	Contemporary	"Work Song" — Hozier	Riker Lynch & Allison Holker; Season 20	Safe
Joey & Jenna	27 (9, 9, 9)	Rumba	"Birds of a Feather" — Billie Eilish	–	Safe
Danny & Witney	27 (9, 9, 9)	Quickstep	"Hey Pachuco" — Royal Crown Revue	Hélio Castroneves & Julianne Hough; Season 5	Safe
Danny & Witney	24 (8, 8, 8)	Jive	"Good Golly, Miss Molly" — Little Richard	–	Safe
Dwight & Daniella	26 (8, 9, 9)	Argentine tango	"Santa María (del Buen Ayre)" — Gotan Project	James Hinchcliffe & Sharna Burgess; Season 23	Eliminated
Dwight & Daniella	22 (8, 7, 7)	Paso doble	"Victorious" — Panic! at the Disco	–	Eliminated
Stephen & Rylee	29 (10, 10, 9)	Viennese waltz	"Glimpse of Us" — Joji	Charli D'Amelio & Mark Ballas; Season 31	Safe
Stephen & Rylee	25 (9, 8, 8)	Jive	"Love Is Embarrassing" — Olivia Rodrigo	–	Safe
Chandler & Brandon	30 (10, 10, 10)	Argentine tango	"Para Te" — Appart	Kellie Pickler & Derek Hough; Season 16	Safe
Chandler & Brandon	30 (10, 10, 10)	Cha-cha-cha	"Apple" — Charli XCX	–	Safe
Ilona & Alan	28 (10, 9, 9)	Quickstep	"Chuck Berry" — Pharrell Williams	Jordan Fisher & Lindsay Arnold; Season 25	Safe
Ilona & Alan	24 (8, 8, 8)	Salsa	"Da' Dip" — Freak Nasty	–	Safe

=== Week 8: Semifinals ===
Each couple performed two unlearned dances: one ballroom and one Latin. No eliminations took place this week; all scores were carried over to the finale. The opening number was choreographed by Sasha Farber and Ezra Sosa to "Dance the Night" by Dua Lipa. The second routine, choreographed by Mandy Moore to "Greedy (Acoustic)" by Tate McRae, featured some of the professional dancers joining the Dancing With The Stars: Live! tour in 2025. There was also a surprise third number to "Looking for a Man in Finance" by Megan Boni, starring Julianne Hough.

Couples are listed in the order they performed.

Dancing with the Stars (season 33) - Week 8
Couple	Scores	Dance	Music
Chandler & Brandon	29 (10, 9, 10)	Salsa	"Spicy Margarita" — Jason Derulo & Michael Bublé
Chandler & Brandon	29 (9, 10, 10)	Foxtrot	"Too Sweet" — Hozier
Joey & Jenna	30 (10, 10, 10)	Foxtrot	"I Won't Dance" — Erin Boheme feat. District 78
Joey & Jenna	28 (9, 10, 9)	Paso doble	"Come Together" — Lennon & McCartney
Ilona & Alan	28 (9, 10, 9)	Paso doble	"Unholy (Orchestral Version)" — Sam Smith & Kim Petras
Ilona & Alan	29 (10, 9, 10)	Viennese waltz	"Golden Hour" — Jvke
Danny & Witney	27 (9, 9, 9)	Viennese waltz	"Gravity" — John Mayer
Danny & Witney	27 (9, 9, 9)	Salsa	"I Like It" — Cardi B, Bad Bunny & J Balvin
Stephen & Rylee	25 (8, 8, 9)	Cha-cha-cha	"Bailar" — Deorro feat. Elvis Crespo
Stephen & Rylee	28 (10, 9, 9)	Tango	"Sweet Disposition" — The Temper Trap

=== Week 9: Finale ===
For the three-hour finale, each couple performed two dances: a redemption dance selected by one of the judges and their freestyle routine. The opening number, choreographed by Ray Leeper, was set to "Holiday" by Madonna. In addition, the professional dancers joining the Dancing with the Stars: Live! tour in 2025 performed a routine to "Rush" by Troye Sivan, choreographed by Mandy Moore. Mark Ballas and Derek Hough performed an Argentine tango to "Libertango" by Tango Bardo. Season 32 champions Xochitl Gomez and Val Chmerkovskiy returned for a performance to "Pink Pony Club" by Chappell Roan.

Other numbers also included Tori Spelling & Pasha Pashkov and Anna Delvey & Ezra Sosa dancing to "I Have Nothing" by Whitney Houston, Reginald VelJohnson & Emma Slater dancing to "As Days Go By" by Jesse Frederick from Family Matters, and Brooks Nader & Gleb Savchenko and Jenn Tran & Sasha Farber dancing to "Reunited" by Peaches & Herb.

Couples are listed in the order they performed.

Dancing with the Stars (season 33) - Week 9
Couple	Judge	Scores	Dance	Music	Result
Stephen & Rylee	Bruno Tonioli	29 (10, 9, 10)	Quickstep	"I'll Be There for You" — The Rembrandts	Fourth place
Stephen & Rylee	Bruno Tonioli	30 (10, 10, 10)	Freestyle	"Viva la Vida" — Coldplay	Fourth place
Joey & Jenna	Derek Hough	30 (10, 10, 10)	Cha-cha-cha	"Can't Stop the Feeling!" — Justin Timberlake	Winners
Joey & Jenna	Derek Hough	29 (9, 10, 10)	Freestyle	"Canned Heat" — District 78 feat. Jake Simpson	Winners
Danny & Witney	Derek Hough	27 (9, 9, 9)	Tango	"I Had Some Help" — Post Malone feat. Morgan Wallen	Fifth place
Danny & Witney	Derek Hough	29 (9, 10, 10)	Freestyle	"Pink" — Lizzo & "I'm Just Ken" — Ryan Gosling	Fifth place
Ilona & Alan	Bruno Tonioli	27 (9, 9, 9)	Jive	"Shake a Tail Feather" — Ray Charles & the Blues Brothers	Runners-up
Ilona & Alan	Bruno Tonioli	30 (10, 10, 10)	Freestyle	"Femininomenon" — District 78 feat. Mona Rue	Runners-up
Chandler & Brandon	Carrie Ann Inaba	30 (10, 10, 10)	Jive	"Apt." — Rosé & Bruno Mars	Third place
Chandler & Brandon	Carrie Ann Inaba	30 (10, 10, 10)	Freestyle	"Hellzapoppin’" — Eyal Vilner Big Band & "Move On Up" — Curtis Mayfield	Third place

== Dance chart ==
The couples performed the following each week:

- Weeks 1–2: One unlearned dance
- Week 3: Two unlearned dances (one each on two consecutive nights)
- Week 4: One unlearned dance
- Week 5: One unlearned dance & team dance
- Week 6: One unlearned dance & dance-off
- Week 7 (Quarterfinals): One unlearned dance & Instant Dance Challenge
- Week 8 (Semifinals): One unlearned ballroom dance & one unlearned Latin dance
- Week 9 (Finale): Redemption dance & freestyle

Dancing with the Stars (season 33) - Dance chart
Couple	Week														
Couple	1	2	3		4	5		6		7		8		9	
Couple	1	2	Night 1	Night 2	4	5		6		7		8		9	
Joey & Jenna	Cha-cha-cha	Rumba	Jive	Tango	Viennese waltz	Samba	Team; Freestyle	Argentine tango	Jive	Contemp.	Rumba	Foxtrot	Paso doble	Cha-cha-cha	Freestyle
Ilona & Alan	Cha-cha-cha	Salsa	Foxtrot	Jive	Rumba	Jazz	Team; Freestyle	Tango	Cha-cha-cha	Quickstep	Salsa	Paso doble	Viennese waltz	Jive	Freestyle
Chandler & Brandon	Tango	Rumba	Cha-cha-cha	Jive	Contemp.	Paso doble	Team; Freestyle	Viennese waltz	Immunity	Argentine tango	Cha-cha-cha	Salsa	Foxtrot	Jive	Freestyle
Stephen & Rylee	Jive	Paso doble	Quickstep	Foxtrot	Argentine tango	Charleston	Team; Freestyle	Contemp.	Salsa	Viennese waltz	Jive	Cha-cha-cha	Tango	Quickstep	Freestyle
Danny & Witney	Tango	Jive	Foxtrot	Paso doble	Contemp.	Jazz	Team; Freestyle	Argentine tango	Jive	Quickstep	Jive	Viennese waltz	Salsa	Tango	Freestyle
Dwight & Daniella	Salsa	Foxtrot	Cha-cha-cha	Paso doble	Rumba	Tango	Team; Freestyle	Contemp.	Cha-cha-cha	Argentine tango	Paso doble				
Jenn & Sasha	Cha-cha-cha	Tango	Viennese waltz	Paso doble	Foxtrot	Rumba	Team; Freestyle	Contemp.	Salsa						
Phaedra & Val	Cha-cha-cha	Foxtrot	Quickstep	Paso doble	Rumba	Jazz	Team; Freestyle								
Brooks & Gleb	Tango	Quickstep	Rumba	Cha-cha-cha	Salsa										
Eric & Britt	Cha-cha-cha	Waltz	Foxtrot	Paso doble											
Reginald & Emma	Salsa	Paso doble	Foxtrot	Cha-cha-cha											
Tori & Pasha	Foxtrot	Rumba													
Anna & Ezra	Cha-cha-cha	Quickstep													
