= The Golden Bachelorette =

American dating reality television series

- Genre: Dating game show
- Presented by: Jesse Palmer
- Country of origin: United States
- Original language: English
- No. of seasons: 1
- No. of episodes: 9

Production
- Production company: Warner Horizon Unscripted Television

Original release
- Network: ABC
- Release: September 18 – November 13, 2024

Related
- The Bachelorette; The Golden Bachelor

The Golden Bachelorette is an American dating reality television series that premiered on September 18, 2024 on ABC. It is a spin-off of The Bachelorette featuring a cast of senior citizens as the contestants and single woman.

The series stars 61-year-old Joan Vassos, a private school administrator and widow from Rockville, Maryland. Vassos was previously a contestant on The Golden Bachelor, but quit in week 3 due to a family emergency.

It concluded on November 13, 2024, with Vassos accepting a proposal from 60-year-old Charles "Chock" Chapple.

== Production ==
=== Filming and development ===
On February 10, 2024, following the success of The Golden Bachelor, ABC ordered the first season of The Golden Bachelorette. On May 14, 2024, Vassos was announced as the inaugural lead of the series.

Filming began in June 2024 in Los Angeles, and concluded in late July in Tahiti.

Musicians Taylor Dayne, Wayne Newton, and REO Speedwagon; comedian Loni Love; Hall of Fame footballers Andre Reed and Eric Dickerson; and former Bachelorettes Kaitlyn Bristowe and Trista Rehn made guest appearances this season.

=== Casting and contestants ===
Notable contestants include Gary Levingston, who is the godson of Tina Turner, Guy Gansert, who is the ex-husband of Nevada politician Heidi Gansert, and Mark Anderson, who is the father of Bachelor season 28 winner Kelsey Anderson.

== Contestants ==
The 24 contestants were announced on August 13, 2024.

Name	Age	Hometown	Occupation	Outcome	Place	Ref
Charles "Chock" Chapple	60	Wichita, Kansas	Insurance Executive	Winner	1	
Guy Gansert	66	Reno, Nevada	ER Doctor	Runner-Up	2	
Pascal Ibgui	69	Glencoe, Illinois	Salon Owner	Week 7	3 (quit)	
Jordan Heller	61	Riverwoods, Illinois	Sales Manager	Week 6	4	
Jonathan Rone	61	Oakland, Iowa	Shipping Consultant	Week 5	5-6	
Keith Gordon	62	Columbus, Indiana	Girl Dad	Week 5	5-6	
Mark Anderson	57	Leesville, Louisiana	Army Veteran	Week 5	7	
Charles Ling	66	Malvern, Pennsylvania	Retired Financial Analyst	Week 4	8–11	
Dan Roemer	64	Naples, Florida	Private Investor	Week 4	8–11	
Gary Levingston	65	Palm Desert, California	Retired Finance Executive	Week 4	8–11	
Gil Ramirez	60	Mission Viejo, California	Educator	Week 4	8–11	
Charles King	62	Rancho Palos Verdes, California	Portfolio Manager	Week 3	12–14	
Gregg Lassen	64	Longboat Key, Florida	Retired University Vice President	Week 3	12–14	
Kim Buike	69	Seattle, Washington	Retired Navy Captain	Week 3	12–14	
Bob Kilroy	66	Marina del Rey, California	Chiropractor	Week 2	15–18	
Christopher Stallworth	64	West Babylon, New York	Contractor	Week 2	15–18	
Jack Lencioni	68	Schererville, Indiana	Caterer	Week 2	15–18	
Michael Stevens	65	Denver, North Carolina	Retired Banking CEO	Week 2	15–18	
Bill Hernandez	68	Portland, Oregon	Retired Videographer	Week 1	19–24	
David Huff	68	Austin, Texas	Rancher	Week 1	19–24	
Ken O'Brien	60	Peabody, Massachusetts	Property Management Treasurer	Week 1	19–24	
Pablo Gonzalez-Juana	63	Cambridge, Maryland	Retired UN Agency Director	Week 1	19–24	
Ralph "RJ" Johnson	66	Irvine, California	Financial Adviser	Week 1	19–24	
Thomas Haughney	62	New York City, New York	FDNY Chief	Week 1	19–24	

=== Future appearances ===
==== Bachelor in Paradise ====
Season 10

Charles King, Gary Levingston, Jack Lencioni, Keith Gordon, Kim Buike, and Ralph “RJ” Johnson all appeared on season 10 of Bachelor in Paradise. King, Lencioni, and Johnson were eliminated week 3. Levingston was eliminated week 5 alongside Leslie Fhima. Buike was eliminated week 6 alongside Faith Martin. Gordon was eliminated week 9 alongside Kathy Swarts.

== Call-out order ==
Order	Bachelors	Week							
Order	Bachelors	1	2	3	4	5	6	7	8
1	Pascal	Keith	Jonathan	Pascal	Chock (Note: Chock temporarily left the competition after his mother passed away, but returned in time for the rose ceremony.)	Pascal	Chock	Chock; Guy	Chock
2	Kim	Dan	Chock	Gil	Jordan	Chock	Guy	Chock; Guy	Guy
3	Chock	Jonathan	Dan	Jonathan	Guy	Guy	Pascal	Pascal	
4	Jonathan	Mark	Mark	Guy	Pascal	Jordan	Jordan		
5	Jordan	Guy	Gary	Dan	Jonathan	Jonathan; Keith			
6	Michael	Charles K.	Pascal	Gary	Mark	Jonathan; Keith			
7	Thomas	Gil	Jordan	Jordan	Keith	Mark			
8	Gary	Gary	Charles K.	Chock	Charles L. Dan; Gary; Gil				
9	Gregg	Pascal	Keith	Charles L.	Charles L. Dan; Gary; Gil				
10	Pablo	Chock	Gil	Keith	Charles L. Dan; Gary; Gil				
11	Bob	Kim	Charles L.	Mark	Charles L. Dan; Gary; Gil				
12	Jack	Christopher	Kim	Charles K. Gregg; Kim					
13	Charles L.	Gregg	Gregg	Charles K. Gregg; Kim					
14	Guy	Charles L.	Guy	Charles K. Gregg; Kim					
15	Charles K.	Jordan	Bob; Christopher; Jack; Michael						
16	Ken	Bob	Bob; Christopher; Jack; Michael						
17	Dan	Michael	Bob; Christopher; Jack; Michael						
18	Christopher	Jack	Bob; Christopher; Jack; Michael						
19	RJ	Bill; David; Ken; Pablo; RJ; Thomas							
20	Gil	Bill; David; Ken; Pablo; RJ; Thomas							
21	Bill	Bill; David; Ken; Pablo; RJ; Thomas							
22	David	Bill; David; Ken; Pablo; RJ; Thomas							
23	Keith	Bill; David; Ken; Pablo; RJ; Thomas							
24	Mark	Bill; David; Ken; Pablo; RJ; Thomas							

The contestant received the first impression rose
The contestant received a rose during a date
The contestant received a rose outside of a rose ceremony or date
The contestant was eliminated
The contestant was eliminated during a date
The contestant was eliminated outside the rose ceremony
The contestant received a rose during a date but quit the competition
The contestant quit the competition
The contestant moved on to the next week by default
The contestant won the competition

== Episodes ==
No.	Title	Original release date	Prod. code	U.S. viewers (millions)	Rating (18–49)
1	"Week 1"	September 18, 2024	101	2.81	0.3
2	"Week 2"	September 25, 2024	102	2.69	0.3
3	"Week 3"	October 2, 2024	103	2.64	0.3
4	"Week 4"	October 9, 2024	104	2.58	0.3
5	"Week 5"	October 16, 2024	105	2.63	0.3
6	"Week 6"	October 23, 2024	106	2.87	0.3
7	"Week 7: Finale Part 1"	October 30, 2024	107	2.85	0.3
8	"The Men Tell All"	November 6, 2024	N/A	2.80	0.3
9	"Week 8: Finale Part 2 and After the Final Rose"	November 13, 2024	108	3.46	0.4
