= Sasha Farber =

Australian professional dancer

- Born: Aleksandr Mikhailovich Farber; 9 May 1984 (age 42); Byelorussian SSR, Soviet Union
- Occupations: Dancer; choreographer
- Years active: 2000–present
- Spouse: Emma Slater (m. 2018; div. 2024)

Aleksandr Mikhailovich "Sasha" Farber (born 9 May 1984) is an Australian professional dancer and choreographer. He is best known for his appearances on the reality competition series Dancing with the Stars.

== Early life ==
Aleksandr Mikhailovich Farber was born to a Jewish family on 9 May 1984 in Byelorussian SSR (present-day Belarus). The town he was born in was not far from Chernobyl, Ukrainian SSR (present-day Ukraine). After the Chernobyl nuclear disaster in 1986, his family emigrated to Sydney, Australia.

== Career ==
Farber began dancing at the age of 13, while training for his bar mitzvah. By 17, he won the Australian Youth Latin Championships twice and represented Australia at the World Latin Championships. He was also featured in the closing ceremony of the 2000 Summer Olympics and appeared on the Australian version of Dancing with the Stars. In 2009, Farber made his Broadway debut as an original cast member on the theatrical dance production Burn the Floor.

=== 2013–present: Dancing with the Stars ===
Farber's tenure on the American version of Dancing with the Stars began on the fourteenth season as a member of the troupe. He was promoted to pro for season 17, where he was partnered with Jersey Shore cast member Nicole "Snooki" Polizzi. Despite receiving good scores from the judges, the pair were eliminated during the seventh week of competition on 28 October 2013, finishing in eighth place. Farber was placed back in the troupe for the next four seasons.

For season 22, Farber was promoted to pro again and was paired with actress Kim Fields. They were eliminated during the seventh week of competition on 2 May 2016 in a double elimination alongside Von Miller and Witney Carson; both couples finished in seventh place.

For season 23, Farber was partnered with Little Women: LA cast member Terra Jolé. They reached the semi-finals and were eliminated during the tenth week of competition on 14 November 2016, finishing in fifth place despite tying for the top of the leaderboard. The season marked Farber's first appearance in the semi-finals.

For season 24, Farber was partnered with Olympic artistic gymnast Simone Biles. They were shockingly eliminated during the semi-finals on 15 May 2017, finishing in fourth place despite receiving two perfect scores from the judges. Farber returned to the troupe for the following season.

Farber appeared as a pro again for the Athletes season, and was paired with Olympic figure skater Tonya Harding. The couple reached the finals and finished in third place on 21 May 2018. This season marked Farber's first appearance in the finale and his highest placement to-date.

For season 27, he was partnered with Olympic artistic gymnast Mary Lou Retton. They were eliminated during the sixth week of competition on 29 October 2018, finishing in ninth place. During the season, Farber also appeared on the spin-off series Dancing with the Stars: Juniors as a mentor for Scottie Pippen’s daughter, Sophia, and pro dancer Jake Monreal. They were eliminated during the third week of competition on 21 October 2018, finishing in ninth place.

For season 28, Farber was paired with singer Ally Brooke of the girl group Fifth Harmony. They reached the finals and finished in third place on 25 November 2019.

For season 29, Farber was partnered with actress Justina Machado. They also reached the finals and finished in fourth place on 23 November 2020.

For season 30, Farber was partnered with Olympic artistic gymnast Suni Lee. They reached the semi-finals and were eliminated on 15 November 2021 in a double elimination alongside Melora Hardin and Artem Chigvintsev. Farber and Lee ultimately finished in fifth place.

For season 31, he was partnered actress Selma Blair. On 17 October 2022, Blair and Farber were forced to withdraw from the competition due to Blair’s ongoing health condition with multiple sclerosis finishing in 12th place.

For season 32, he was partnered with film & television actress Alyson Hannigan. The couple made it to the finale and finished in fifth place.

For season 33, Farber was partnered with The Bachelorette star Jenn Tran. They were eliminated week 6, and finished in 7th place.

Season	Partner	Place
17	Snooki	8th
22	Kim Fields	7th
23	Terra Jolé	5th
24	Simone Biles	4th
26	Tonya Harding	3rd
27	Mary Lou Retton	9th
28	Ally Brooke	3rd
29	Justina Machado	4th
30	Suni Lee	5th
31	Selma Blair	12th
32	Alyson Hannigan	5th
33	Jenn Tran	7th

==== Season 17 ====
Celebrity partner: Nicole "Snooki" Polizzi

Week	Dance	Music	Judges' scores (Note: Individual judges' scores are listed in the following order: Carrie Ann Inaba, Len Goodman, Bruno Tonioli.)			Total score	Result
1	Cha-cha-cha	"Wild Ones" — Flo Rida, feat. Sia	7	8	7	22	No Elimination
2	Rumba	"Just Give Me a Reason" — P!nk, feat. Nate Ruess	7	7	7	21	Safe
3	Quickstep	"Sparkling Diamonds" — Nicole Kidman	9	8	8	25	Safe
4	Jive	"Mickey" 一 Toni Basil	8	8 (Note: Julianne Hough filled in for Len Goodman.)	8	24	Safe
5	Jazz	"Work Bitch" — Britney Spears	9	9	9	27	Safe
6	Foxtrot	"Build Me Up Buttercup" — The Foundations	9	9	9	27	No Elimination
6	Megamix Switch-Up Challenge	"Hot in Herre" — Nelly "In the Hall of the Mountain King" — Edvard Grieg "Let's Get It On" — Marvin Gaye "Doop" — Doop	+3			3 (Note: Nicole and Sasha received 3 bonus points from the switch-up challenge.)	No Elimination
7	Samba	"Hey Mama" — Black Eyed Peas	9	9	9	27	Eliminated
7	Team Freestyle	"Bom Bom" — Sam and the Womp	9	9	9	27	Eliminated

==== Season 22 ====
Celebrity partner: Kim Fields

Week	Dance	Music	Judges' scores (Note: Individual judges' scores are listed in the following order: Carrie Ann Inaba, Len Goodman, Bruno Tonioli.)			Total score	Result
1	Cha-cha-cha	"Sax" — Fleur East	7	6	7	20	No Elimination
2	Salsa	"Conga" — Miami Sound Machine	7	6	6	19	Safe
3	Foxtrot	"Theme from The Facts of Life" — Al Burton, Gloria Loring & Alan Thicke	8	7	7	22	Safe
4	Quickstep	"I Wan'na Be Like You (The Monkey Song)" — Fall Out Boy	8	8	8	32 (Note: Kim and Sasha received a score of 8 from guest judge Zendaya.)	Safe
5	Viennese waltz (Note: Week 5 was switch-up week. Kim Fields officially danced with Keo Motsepe, but their scores went towards her average with Sasha.)	"These Arms of Mine" — Otis Redding	8	6	8	28 (Note: Kim and Keo received a score of 6 from guest judge Maksim Chmerkovskiy.)	No Elimination
5	Rumba (Note: Week 5 was switch-up week. Sasha officially danced with Paige VanZant, but his score did not contribute to his average with Kim Fields.)	"Perfect" — One Direction	8	8	8	31 (Note: Paige and Sasha received a score of 7 from guest judge Maksim Chmerkovskiy.)	No Elimination
6	Jive	"You Can't Stop the Beat" — from Hairspray	8	8	8	24	Safe
7	Samba	"ABC" — The Jackson 5	9	9	9	27	Eliminated
7	Team Freestyle	"End of Time" "If I Were a Boy" "Crazy in Love" — Beyoncé	8	8	9	25	Eliminated

==== Season 23 ====
Celebrity partner: Terra Jolé

Week	Dance	Music	Judges' scores (Note: Individual judges' scores are listed in the following order: Carrie Ann Inaba, Len Goodman, Julianne Hough, Bruno Tonioli.)				Total score	Result
1	Jive	"Stuff Like That There" — Betty Hutton	7	6	6	6	25	No Elimination
2	Quickstep	"Bewitched Theme" — Howard Greenfield & Jack Keller	8	7	8	8	31	Safe
3	Viennese waltz	"Iris" — Goo Goo Dolls	8	7	8	7	30	Safe
4	Samba	"Tzelma" — Benoît Jutras	9	—N/a	8	8	25 (Note: Due to Len Goodman's absence, scores were given on a 30 point scale.)	Safe
5	Contemporary	"Stand by Me" — Florence + The Machine	9	—N/a	9	9	27 (Note: Due to Len Goodman's absence, scores were given on a 30 point scale.)	No Elimination
6	Paso doble	"Don't Let Me Be Misunderstood" — Santa Esmeralda	7	—N/a	8	7	30 (Note: Terra and Sasha received a score of 8 from guest judge Pitbull.)	Safe
7	Foxtrot	"Cheek to Cheek" — Ella Fitzgerald & Louis Armstrong	9	8	9	8	34	Safe
7	Team Freestyle	"Embrace" — Armin van Buuren, feat. Eric Vloeimans	8	9	9	9	35	Safe
8	Cha-cha-cha	"Day-O (The Banana Boat Song)" — Harry Belafonte	8	—N/a	8	8	24 (Note: Due to Len Goodman's absence, scores were given on a 30 point scale.)	Safe
8	Salsa Dance-off	"Magic" — Robin Thicke	Loser				0 (Note: Terra & Sasha received one vote from Carrie Ann, but lost the dance-off.)	Safe
9	Charleston	"If My Friends Could See Me Now" — Cy Coleman	10	—N/a	9	9	38 (Note: Terra and Sasha received a score of 10 from guest judge Idina Menzel.)	Safe
9	Jazz Team-up (Note: Terra and Sasha were partnered with Marilu and Derek.)	"Big Noise from Winnetka" — Bette Midler	9	—N/a	9	9	36 (Note: The team-up dance received a score of 9 from guest judge Idina Menzel.)	Safe
10	Rumba	"Scars to Your Beautiful" — Alessia Cara	10	—N/a	10	10	30 (Note: Due to Len Goodman's absence, scores were given on a 30 point scale.)	Eliminated
10	Tango	"Hideaway" — Kiesza	10	—N/a	10	10	30 (Note: Due to Len Goodman's absence, scores were given on a 30 point scale.)	Eliminated

==== Season 24 ====
Celebrity partner: Simone Biles

Week	Dance	Music	Judges' scores (Note: Individual judges' scores are listed in the following order: Carrie Ann Inaba, Len Goodman, Julianne Hough, Bruno Tonioli.)				Total score	Result
1	Tango	"Untouchable" — Tritonal & Cash Cash, feat. JHart	8	8	8	8	32	No Elimination
2	Cha-cha-cha	"Burnin' Up" — Jessie J, feat. 2 Chainz	7	7	7	7	28	Safe
3	Quickstep	"Viva Las Vegas" — Elvis Presley	7	8	9	9	33	Safe
4	Viennese waltz	"Good Good Father" — Chris Tomlin	9	9	9	9	36	Safe
5	Contemporary	"How Far I'll Go" — Auliʻi Cravalho	9	9	10	10	38	Safe
6	Samba	"Survivor" — Destiny's Child	9	9	8	9	35	Safe
6	Team Freestyle	"My Boyfriend's Back" — The Chiffons "No Scrubs" — TLC "Bo$$" — Fifth Harmony	8	8	9	9	34	Safe
7	Charleston	"Charleston" — Bob Wilson and his Varsity Rhythm Boys	10	9	9	9	37	Safe
7	Cha-cha-cha Dance-off	"Crave" — Pharrell Williams	Winner				2 (Note: Simone & Sasha also received 2 bonus votes for winning the dance-off. They got votes from all four judges, plus the public vote (63%).)	Safe
8	Foxtrot	"What Makes You Beautiful" — One Direction	9	9	9	9	36	Safe
8	Paso doble	"Don't Let Me Down" — The Chainsmokers, feat. Daya	9	9	9	9	36	Safe
9	Jive	"Faith" — Stevie Wonder, feat. Ariana Grande	10	10	10	10	40	Eliminated
9	Rumba	"Skyscraper" — Demi Lovato	10	10	10	10	40	Eliminated

==== Season 26 ====
Celebrity partner: Tonya Harding

Week	Dance	Music	Judges' scores (Note: Individual judges' scores are listed in the following order: Carrie Ann Inaba, Len Goodman, Bruno Tonioli.)			Total score	Result
1	Foxtrot	"When You Believe" — Whitney Houston & Mariah Carey	8	8	7	23	Safe
2	Quickstep	"Redneck Woman" — Gretchen Wilson	8	8	8	33 (Note: Tonya and Sasha also received a score of 9 from guest judge Rashad Jennings.)	Safe
2	Team Freestyle	"...Baby One More Time" — The Baseballs	8	8	8	33 (Note: The team dance also received a score of 9 from guest judge Rashad Jennings.)	Safe
3	Rumba	"See You Again" — Tyler Ward	8	8	8	33 (Note: Tonya and Sasha also received a score of 9 from guest judge David Ross.)	Safe
3	Cha-cha-cha Dance-off	"Dance" — DNCE	Winner			2 (Note: Tonya and Sasha also received 2 bonus points for winning the dance-off.)	Safe
4	Viennese waltz	"The Time of My Life" — David Cook	8	9	9	26	Third Place
4	Freestyle	"I Will Survive" — The Pussycat Dolls	10	10	10	30	Third Place

==== Season 27 ====
Celebrity partner: Mary Lou Retton

Week	Dance	Music	Judges' scores (Note: Individual judges' scores are listed in the following order: Carrie Ann Inaba, Len Goodman, Bruno Tonioli.)			Total score	Result
1	Cha-cha-cha	"Treasure" — Bruno Mars	6	7	6	19	Bottom Five
1	Cha-cha-cha	"Hot Stuff" — Donna Summer	7	7	7	21	Safe
2	Waltz	"(You Make Me Feel Like) A Natural Woman" — Sarah Bockel	8	7	7	22	No Elimination
2	Samba	"Copacabana" — Barry Manilow	8	8	8	24	Safe
3	Viennese waltz	"We Are the Champions" — Ray Chew	8	8	8	24	Safe
4	Charleston	"V.E.S.P.A." — Dimie Cat	9	8	9	26	Safe
5	Contemporary	"Reflection" — Lea Salonga	9	8	8	25	No Elimination
6	Tango	"Shame" — Elle King	8	8	8	24	Eliminated

==== Season 28 ====
Celebrity partner: Ally Brooke

Week	Dance	Music	Judges' scores (Note: Individual judges' scores are listed in the following order: Carrie Ann Inaba, Len Goodman, Bruno Tonioli.)			Total score	Result
1	Cha-cha-cha	"Work from Home" — Fifth Harmony	5	5	6	16	No Elimination
2	Viennese waltz	"Iris" — Kina Grannis	7	6	7	20	Safe
3	Rumba	"Dreaming of You" — Selena	8	8	8	24	Safe
4	Jive	"Proud Mary" — Tina Turner	8	8	8	32 (Note: Ally and Sasha also received a score of 8 from guest judge Leah Remini.)	Safe
5	Contemporary	"Beauty and the Beast" — Ariana Grande & John Legend	9	9	9	27	No Elimination
6	Quickstep	"Take On Me" — A-ha	8	9	8	25	Bottom Two
7	Tango	"Sweet but Psycho" — Ava Max	9	9	9	27	Safe
7	Team Freestyle	"Somebody's Watching Me" — Rockwell	9	9	9	27	Safe
8	Paso doble	"Higher" — Ally Brooke, feat. Matoma	10	10	10	30	Bottom Two
8	Jive Dance-off	"Don't Stop Me Now" — Queen	Loser			0 (Note: Ally & Sasha did not receive any bonus points for losing the dance-off.)	Bottom Two
9	Samba	"Wannabe" — Spice Girls	10	10	10	40 (Note: Ally and Sasha also received a score of 10 from guest judge Joey Fatone.)	Safe
9	Jazz	"Step by Step" — New Kids on the Block	10	10	10	40 (Note: Ally and Sasha also received a score of 10 from guest judge Joey Fatone.)	Safe
10	Viennese waltz	"Perfect" — Ed Sheeran	10	9	10	29	Bottom Two
10	Charleston	"Sing, Sing, Sing (With a Swing)" — Benny Goodman	10	10	10	30	Bottom Two
11	Jive	"Proud Mary" — Tina Turner	10	10	10	30	Third Place
11	Freestyle	"Conga" — Gloria Estefan & Miami Sound Machine	10	10	10	30	Third Place

==== Season 29 ====
Celebrity partner: Justina Machado

Week	Dance	Music	Judges' scores (Note: Individual judges' scores are listed in the following order: Carrie Ann Inaba, Derek Hough, Bruno Tonioli.)			Total score	Result
1	Cha-cha-cha	"Respect" — Aretha Franklin	7	7	7	21	No Elimination
2	Foxtrot	"When You Believe" — Mariah Carey & Whitney Houston	7	7	7	21	Safe
3	Charleston	"Supercalifragilisticexpialidocious" — Julie Andrews & Dick Van Dyke	7	6	6	19	Safe
4	Salsa	"Que Viva La Vida" — Wisin	8	8	8	24	Safe
5	Jazz	"Maniac" — Michael Sembello	8	8	8	24	Safe
6	Viennese waltz	"She's Always a Woman" — Billy Joel	9	9	9	27	Safe
7	Tango	"Take Me to Church" — MILCK	9	9	8	26	Safe
8	Samba	"Magalenha" — Sérgio Mendes, feat. Carlinhos Brown	9	9	9	27	Safe
8	Viennese waltz Relay	"I Have Nothing" — Whitney Houston	+2			2 (Note: Justina and Sasha were awarded two bonus points from the relay.)	Safe
9	Rumba	"Crazy for You" — Madonna	8	8	8	24	Safe
9	Cha-cha-cha Dance-off	"Telephone" — Lady Gaga, feat. Beyoncé	Winner			2 (Note: Justina & Sasha also received 2 bonus votes for winning the dance-off.)	Safe
10	Tango	"El Tango de Roxanne" — from Moulin Rouge!	9	10	9	28	Bottom Three
10	Contemporary	"Holding Out for a Hero" — Ella Mae Bowen & Bonnie Tyler	10	10	10	30	Bottom Three
11	Cha-cha-cha	"Respect" — Aretha Franklin	10	10	10	30	Fourth Place
11	Freestyle	"Let's Get Loud" — Jennifer Lopez "Bamboleo" — Gipsy Kings	10	10	10	30	Fourth Place

==== Season 30 ====
Celebrity partner: Suni Lee

Week	Dance	Music	Judges' scores (Note: Individual judges' scores are listed in the following order: Carrie Ann Inaba, Len Goodman, Derek Hough, Bruno Tonioli.)				Total score	Result
1	Jive	"Stay" — The Kid Laroi & Justin Bieber	7	7	7	7	28	No Elimination
2	Cha-cha-cha	"I Like It" — Cardi B, Bad Bunny & J Balvin	7	7	7	7	28	Safe
3	Foxtrot	"I'm a Slave 4 U" — Britney Spears	7	7	—N/a	7	21 (Note: Due to Derek Hough's absence, scores were given on a 30 point scale.)	Safe
4	Salsa	"Colombia, Mi Encanto" — Carlos Vives	8	8	9	8	33	No Elimination
4	Viennese waltz	"I Put a Spell on You" — Annie Lennox	9	8	9	9	35	Safe
5	Charleston	"Born to Hand Jive" — Sha Na Na	9	9	9	9	36	Safe
6	Tango	"Bad Habits" — Ed Sheeran	9	9	9	9	36	Bottom Two
7	Paso doble	"We Will Rock You" — Queen	8	8	8	9	33	Safe
7	Viennese waltz Relay	"We Are the Champions" — Queen	+1				1 (Note: Suni and Sasha received one point from Carrie Ann.)	Safe
8	Samba	"All for You" — Janet Jackson	10	10	10	10	40	Safe
8	Salsa Dance-off	"Made for Now" — Janet Jackson featuring Daddy Yankee	Winner				2 (Note: Suni and Sasha were awarded two bonus points for winning the dance-off.)	Safe
9	Foxtrot	"Haven't Met You Yet" — Michael Bublé	10	9	9	9	37	Eliminated
9	Contemporary	"Gravity" — Sara Bareilles	10	9	10	9	38	Eliminated

==== Season 31 ====
Celebrity partner: Selma Blair

Week	Dance	Music	Judges' scores (Note: Individual judges' scores are listed in the following order: Carrie Ann Inaba, Len Goodman, Derek Hough, Bruno Tonioli.)				Total score	Result
1	Viennese waltz	"The Time of My Life" — David Cook	7	7	7	7	28	Safe
2	Jive	"Jailhouse Rock" — Elvis Presley	7	7	7	7	28	Safe
3	Rumba	"For Your Eyes Only" — Sheena Easton	7	7	7	7	28	Safe
4	Quickstep	"The Muppet Show Theme" — Jim Henson & Sam Pottle	8	8	8	8	32	Safe
5	Waltz	"What the World Needs Now Is Love" — Andra Day	10	10	10	10	40	Withdrew

==== Season 32 ====
Celebrity partner: Alyson Hannigan

Week	Dance	Music	Judges' scores (Note: Individual judges' scores are listed in the following order: Carrie Ann Inaba, Derek Hough, Bruno Tonioli.)			Total score	Result
1	Salsa	"Never Gonna Not Dance Again" — Pink	5	4	4	13	Safe
2	Tango	"Can't Remember to Forget You" — Shakira, feat. Rihanna	7	6	6	19	Safe
3	Foxtrot	"Ain't No Mountain High Enough" — Marvin Gaye & Tammi Terrell	6	6	6	24 (Note: Alyson and Sasha also received a score of 6 from guest judge Michael Strahan.)	Safe
4	Jazz	"Be Our Guest" — Jerry Orbach, Angela Lansbury, and Chorus	6	6	6	18	Safe
5	Viennese waltz	"Perfect" — Ed Sheeran	7	7	7	21	Safe
6	Paso doble	"Supermassive Black Hole" — Muse	7	7	8	29 (Note: Alyson and Sasha also received a score of 7 from guest judge Niecy Nash-Betts.)	Safe
6	Hustle & Charleston Marathon	"Stayin' Alive" — Bee Gees "Grim Grinning Ghosts" — Kris Bowers	+2			2 (Note: Alyson and Sasha received 2 bonus points from the dance marathon.)	Safe
7	Quickstep	"Candyman" — Christina Aguilera	8	8	8	33 (Note: Alyson and Sasha also received a score of 9 from guest judge Paula Abdul.)	Safe
7	Team Freestyle	"Everybody (Backstreet's Back)" — Backstreet Boys	9	9	9	37 (Note: The team dance also received a score of 10 from guest judge Paula Abdul.)	Safe
8	Contemporary	"The Greatest Love of All" — Whitney Houston	8	8	8	33 (Note: Alyson and Sasha also received a score of 9 from guest judge Billy Porter.)	Safe
8	Rumba Dance-off	"One Moment in Time" — Whitney Houston	Winner			3 (Note: Alyson and Sasha received 3 bonus points for winning the dance-off.)	Safe
9	Cha-cha-cha	"You Belong with Me" — Taylor Swift	7	7	7	29 (Note: Alyson and Sasha also received a score of 8 from guest judge Mandy Moore.)	Safe
9	Jive Relay	"Shake It Off" — Taylor Swift	Winner			3 (Note: Alyson and Sasha received 3 bonus points for winning the relay.)	Safe
10	Jive	"Footloose" — Kenny Loggins	9	8	8	25	Safe
10	Waltz	"Come Away with Me" — Norah Jones	8	9	9	26	Safe
11	Salsa	"Get on Your Feet" — Gloria Estefan	9	8	8	25	Fifth Place
11	Freestyle	"Enchanted" — Taylor Swift "Papi" — Jennifer Lopez	9	9	10	28	Fifth Place

==== Season 33 ====
Celebrity partner: Jenn Tran

Week	Dance	Music	Judges' scores (Note: Individual judges' scores are listed in the following order: Carrie Ann Inaba, Derek Hough, Bruno Tonioli.)			Total score	Result
1	Cha-cha-cha	"Flowers" — Miley Cyrus	7	6	6	19	No Elimination
2	Tango	"A Little Party Never Killed Nobody (All We Got)" — Fergie, Q-Tip & GoonRock	6	6	7	19	Safe
3	Viennese waltz	"Fallin'" — Alicia Keys	8	7	8	31 (Note: Jenn and Sasha also received a score of 8 from guest judge Rosie Perez.)	No Elimination
3	Paso doble	"The Final Countdown" — Europe	8	8	8	31 (Note: Jenn and Sasha also received a score of 7 from guest judge Gene Simmons.)	Safe
4	Foxtrot	"The Archer" — Taylor Swift	8	8	8	32 (Note: Jenn and Sasha also received a score of 8 from guest judge Mark Ballas)	Safe
5	Rumba	"Kiss the Girl" — Samuel E. Wright	8	8	8	24	Safe
5	Team Freestyle	"I 2 I" — Tevin Campbell & Rosie Gaines	9	9	9	27	Safe
6	Contemporary	"Vampire" — Olivia Rodrigo	10	9	9	28	Eliminated
6	Jive Dance-off	"Time Warp" — Little Nell, Patricia Quinn, & Richard O'Brien	Winner			3 (Note: Jenn and Sasha received 3 bonus points for winning the dance-off.)	Eliminated

== Personal life ==
In 2011, Farber entered a relationship with fellow Dancing with the Stars pro Emma Slater. He proposed to her on 4 October 2016 after they performed a contemporary routine to Bruno Mars' "Just the Way You Are" during a results episode on the twenty-third season. The two married on 25 March 2018 in Los Angeles, California, and gained American citizenship together in December 2020. Farber and Slater separated on 1 April 2022 after four years of marriage. Slater filed for divorce in February 2023, citing "irreconcilable differences". Proceedings were finalised on 16 May 2024.

Farber was in a year-long relationship with television personality Jenn Tran, whom he was partnered with on the thirty-third season of Dancing with the Stars. As of April 2026, Farber is in a relationship with actress and musician Janel Parrish. They broke up in July 2026.

== Awards and achievements ==
Awards and achievements
Preceded by Calvin Johnson Jr. & Lindsay Arnold; Evanna Lynch & Keo Motsepe	Dancing with the Stars (US) third place contestant Season 26 (Spring 2018 with Tonya Harding); Season 28 (Fall 2019 with Ally Brooke)	Succeeded by Evanna Lynch & Keo Motsepe; Nelly & Daniella Karagach
Preceded by Lauren Alaina & Gleb Savchenko	Dancing with the Stars (US) fourth place contestant Season 29 (Fall 2020 with Justina Machado)	Succeeded by Cody Rigsby & Cheryl Burke
Preceded by N/A	Dancing with the Stars (US) fifth place contestant Season 32 (Fall 2023 with Alyson Hannigan)	Succeeded by Danny Amendola & Witney Carson
