= The Golden Bachelor =

- Genre: Dating game show
- Presented by: Jesse Palmer
- Country of origin: United States
- Original language: English
- No. of seasons: 2
- No. of episodes: 19

Production
- Production company: Warner Horizon Unscripted Television

Original release
- Network: ABC
- Release: September 28, 2023 – present

Related
- The Bachelor franchise

The Golden Bachelor is an American dating reality television series that premiered September 28, 2023, on ABC. A spin-off of The Bachelor, it features seniors as contestants. The second season premiered on September 24, 2025.

== History ==
In January 2020, a casting call was issued by the producers of The Bachelor for a new dating show featuring men and women aged 65 and older. In July 2020, Variety reported that production on the series and other Bachelor spin-offs had been paused due to the impact of the COVID-19 pandemic, in order to prioritize production of the next seasons of The Bachelorette and The Bachelor. ABC unscripted executive Rob Mills told Variety that the response to the initial call had been "rabid", and that some of the casting interviews were "touching". He stated that the network planned to prioritize Bachelor in Paradise next, but that "we absolutely want to get [the senior spin-off] done, but we want to do it right, do it safely and not at the expense of the other Bachelor cycles."

On May 16, 2023, ABC ordered The Golden Bachelor to series. On July 17, 2023, ABC announced 72-year-old Gerry Turner as the inaugural lead for season 1. Filming began in August 2023 in Los Angeles, and concluded in Costa Rica. As a result of the 2023 Writers Guild of America strike, the first season aired on Thursday nights followed by the ninth season of Bachelor in Paradise instead of on its originally intended Monday-night scheduling, to fill timeslots left vacant by scripted shows.

The series premiere of The Golden Bachelor was the highest-rated season premiere in the overall Bachelor franchise since 2021, while ABC stated that it was the network's most-streamed non-scripted program on Hulu. Its season finale was the most-watched episode of the Bachelor franchise since The Bachelor's season 25 finale in 2021.

In February 2024, ABC ordered The Golden Bachelorette, an equivalent spin-off for The Bachelorette. On April 22, 2025, ABC renewed The Golden Bachelor for a second season, and announced 66-year-old retired football player Mel Owens as its lead.

== Seasons ==
Season	Original run	Bachelor	Winner	Runner(s)-up	Proposal	Still together?	Relationship status
1	September 28 – November 30, 2023	Gerry Turner	Theresa Nist	Leslie Fhima	Yes	No	Nist married Turner in a live The Golden Wedding special broadcast by ABC on January 4, 2024, but they filed for divorce three months later.
2	September 24 – November 12, 2025	Mel Owens	Peg Munson	Cindy Cullers	No	No	Mel offered Peg a promise ring. They have since broken up.

== International versions ==
=== Australia ===
In late 2024, it was reported that an Australian version has been commissioned for the Nine Network. This is the first Australian iteration of the Bachelor franchise to not be aired on Network 10, who have aired the Australian versions of The Bachelor, The Bachelorette and Bachelor in Paradise. In October 2024, the series was confirmed by Nine at their 2025 Upfronts, with Samantha Armytage to host the series and produced by Warner Bros. International Television Production Australia. In September 2025, Nine announced The Golden Bachelor as 61-year-old Sydneysider Barry ‘Bear’ Myrden along with the 20 women competing on the series.

=== The Netherlands ===
On August 10, 2024, a Dutch version was announced to air early 2025 on Dutch streaming service Videoland, produced by Warner Bros. International TV Productions. Chantal Janzen is set to host the series. The Bachelor is 72-year-old entrepreneur Gerard.
