= Jenn Tran =

American television personality (born 1997)

- Born: Jennifer Tran; November 24, 1997 (age 28); Hillsdale, New Jersey, U.S.
- Education: University of Wisconsin–Madison (BS); Barry University (MS)
- Occupations: Physician assistant; television personality
- Years active: 2015–present
- Height: 5 ft 1 in (1.55 m)

Jennifer Tran (born November 24, 1997) is an American physician assistant and television personality. She first appeared on the twenty-eighth season of the dating reality television series The Bachelor, and was the star of the twenty-first season of its spin-off The Bachelorette. She is the first Asian American to lead the Bachelor franchise.

== Early life and education ==
Jennifer Tran was born on November 24, 1997, in Hillsdale, New Jersey, to Vietnamese immigrants. She was raised Buddhist with her older brother, James. She graduated from Pascack Valley High School in 2016, where she played basketball and lacrosse.

Tran attended the University of Pittsburgh for two years. She transferred to the University of Wisconsin–Madison in 2018, where she joined the Alpha Phi sorority. She received her Bachelor of Science in molecular biology in 2020. After graduating, Tran entered the physician assistant program at Barry University; she temporarily suspended her studies to participate on a variety of television programs. In 2026, she graduated with a master's degree in clinical medical science and earned her physician assistant certification.

== Career ==
In September 2023, Tran was revealed as a contestant on the twenty-eighth season of the dating reality television series The Bachelor, starring teaching tennis pro Joey Graziadei. She finished in fifth place, with Graziadei sending her home at the last rose ceremony before hometowns. Tran was announced as the star of the twenty-first season of the spin-off series The Bachelorette on March 25, 2024, during the After the Final Rose special. She is the first Asian American and first practicing Buddhist to lead the Bachelor franchise. During the finale, Tran became engaged to her final choice, Devin Strader, but he ended the engagement a few months later.

In a last-minute casting, Tran was announced as a contestant on the thirty-third season of the competition series Dancing with the Stars on September 4, 2024. She was partnered with professional dancer Sasha Farber. Despite receiving her first 10 and winning a dance-off, Tran and Farber were eliminated during the sixth week of competition on October 29, 2024, finishing in seventh place.

== Personal life ==
Tran was in a year-long relationship with her Dancing with the Stars partner Sasha Farber.

== Filmography ==
=== Television ===
Year	Title	Role	Notes
2024	The Bachelor	Herself	Contestant; season 28; fifth place
2024	The Bachelorette	Herself	Lead; season 21
2024	Dancing with the Stars	Herself	Contestant; season 33; seventh place

Preceded by Charity Lawson	The Bachelorette; Season 21	Succeeded by Taylor Frankie Paul
