= Joey Graziadei =

American television personality (born 1995)

- Born: Joseph Michael Graziadei; May 24, 1995 (age 31); Boca Raton, Florida, U.S.
- Education: West Chester University (BA)
- Occupations: Television personality; tennis coach
- Height: 5 ft 11 in (1.80 m)
- Partner(s): Kelsey Anderson (2023–present; engaged)

Joseph Michael Graziadei (born May 24, 1995) is an American television personality who is best known as the runner-up on season 20 of The Bachelorette and as the star of season 28 of The Bachelor. He won the 33rd season of Dancing with the Stars and was the host of the official Dancing with the Stars podcast.

== Early life and education ==
Graziadei was born in Boca Raton, Florida, and raised in Royersford, Pennsylvania, to parents Nick and Cathy. He has two sisters: Carly and Ellie. When he was in kindergarten, his parents divorced after his father came out as gay.

Graziadei graduated from Spring-Ford High School in 2013, and then played tennis at West Chester University, where he graduated in 2017 with a degree in communication and media studies. While in college, he was a member of the Pi Kappa Alpha fraternity. After graduating, he moved to Hawaii.

== Career ==
Prior to appearing on The Bachelorette, Graziadei was a teaching tennis pro and Ike Kuluz ambassador at the Club at Kukui'ula in Koloa, Hawaii.

=== Reality television ===
==== The Bachelorette ====
In March 2023, Graziadei was revealed to be a contestant on season 20 of The Bachelorette, starring Charity Lawson. He made it to the final two, but was rejected in favor of fellow contestant Dotun Olubeko.

==== The Bachelor ====
On August 21, 2023, during the live Bachelorette season 20 finale, Graziadei was chosen as the lead of season 28 of The Bachelor.

==== Dancing with the Stars ====
On September 4, 2024, Graziadei was announced as a contestant on season 33 of Dancing with the Stars, partnering with Jenna Johnson. On November 26, they were crowned the winners of the season and were awarded the Len Goodman Mirrorball Trophy, with Graziadei becoming the first man from the Bachelor franchise to win Dancing with the Stars.

Week #	Dance / Song	Judges' scores			Result
Week #	Dance / Song	Inaba	Hough	Tonioli	Result
1	Cha-cha-cha / "Dancin' in the Country"	7	7	7	No elimination
2	Rumba / "Shallow"	8	7	7	Safe
3	Jive / "Shout"; Tango / "Rock You Like a Hurricane"	9; 9	8; 9	8; 9	No elimination Safe
4	Viennese waltz / "Lose Control"	9	9	9	Safe
5	Samba / "Trashin' the Camp"; Team Freestyle / "I 2 I"	8; 9	8; 9	9; 9	Safe
6	Argentine tango / "Ramalama (Bang Bang)"	10	9	10	Safe
7	Contemporary / "Work Song"; Instant Rumba / "Birds of a Feather"	9; 9	10; 9	9; 9	Safe
8 Semi-finals	Foxtrot / "I Won't Dance"; Paso doble / "Come Together"	10; 9	10; 10	10; 9	No elimination
9 Finals	Cha-cha-cha / "Can't Stop the Feeling!"; Freestyle / "Canned Heat"	10; 9	10; 10	10; 10	Winner

== Personal life ==
In high school, Graziadei was diagnosed with Gilbert's syndrome.

On November 12, 2023, Graziadei became engaged to junior project manager Kelsey Anderson, who won his season of The Bachelor. This was chronicled in the season finale, which aired on March 25, 2024. Graziadei proposed to Anderson for the second time with a new engagement ring in May 2026 during a trip to Cabo San Lucas, Mexico.

== Filmography ==
Key
†	Denotes television productions that have not yet been released

Year	Title	Role	Notes
2023	The Bachelorette	Himself	Runner-up; season 20
2023	The Golden Bachelor	Himself	Guest; season 1, episode 4
2024	The Bachelor	Himself	Lead; season 28
2024	9-1-1	Himself	Guest; season 7, episode 4
2024	Celebrity Family Feud	Himself	Contestant; season 11, episode 3
2024	Dancing with the Stars	Himself	Winner; season 33
2025	Celebrity Weakest Link	Contestant	Season 1, episode 3
2026	R.J. Decker	Pickpocket Thief	Season 2, episode 1
2026	The Holiday Spark	Dean	Major acting debut
2027	The Traitors †	Contestant	Season 6

Preceded by Aven Jones	The Bachelorette runner up Season 20	Succeeded by Marcus Shoberg
Preceded by Zach Shallcross	The Bachelor; Season 28 (2024)	Succeeded by Grant Ellis
