= Lindsay Arnold =

American professional dancer (born 1994)

- Born: January 11, 1994 (age 32); Provo, Utah, U.S.
- Education: Timpview High School
- Occupations: Dancer; choreographer; media personality; businesswoman
- Years active: 2002–present
- Height: 5 ft 5.5 in (166 cm)
- Spouse: Samuel Cusick (m. 2015)
- Children: 3
- Relatives: Rylee Arnold (sister)
- Website: www.lindsayarnold.com

Lindsay Arnold Cusick (née Arnold; born January 11, 1994) is an American professional dancer, choreographer, and businesswoman. Specialized in Latin and ballroom dance styles, she was a contestant on the ninth season of the reality competition series So You Think You Can Dance.

Arnold joined Dancing with the Stars as a pro in 2013, as one of the youngest pros in history. She won its twenty-fifth season with singer-actor Jordan Fisher and set the record for the most perfect scores earned in a single season, with nine.

== Early life ==
Lindsay Arnold was born on January 11, 1994, in Provo, Utah, to Joshua Arnold, a physician assistant and former defensive back for the BYU Cougars, and Melinda "Mindy" Arnold (née Peay), a physical therapist. She is the oldest of four daughters; her sisters Jensen (b. 1997), Brynley (b. 2000), and Rylee (b. 2005), are also dancers.

Arnold began dancing when she was four years old. As her sisters followed in her footsteps and dance dominated their household, their mother opened The Vibe, a dance studio in Lindon, Utah that offered a "family environment" for them to perform in. Arnold trained under head director Rick Robinson and other teachers in a variety of mediums, including ballet, jazz, hip hop, contemporary, Latin and ballroom. Most of her training, however, was with her main ballroom coach, Shirley Ballas. After graduating from Timpview High School, Arnold planned to study physical therapy at Utah Valley University on a full academic scholarship.

== Career ==
By the age of eight, Arnold found a ballroom partner and began entering dancesport competitions. She placed first in the U.S Open Youth Latin Championships and the U.S. Open Junior Latin Championships, was a top three finalist in the World Junior Latin Team Match, and was a top five finalist at the World Cup Latin Junior Championships and U.S. Junior National 10 Dance Championships.

=== 2012: So You Think You Can Dance ===
Arnold auditioned for the ninth season of the dance competition series So You Think You Can Dance on February 23, 2012, in Salt Lake City. She was named one of the season's top twenty contestants and was first partnered with martial arts fusion dancer Cole Horibe. As the season progressed, Arnold was paired with contemporary dancer Jakob Karr and ballet dancer Alex Wong. She was ultimately eliminated alongside contemporary dancer Will Thomas on August 29, 2012, finishing within the top eight. Arnold later performed on the series' accompanying tour from October to December 2012.

=== 2013–2021: Dancing with the Stars ===
Arnold became a professional dancer on season 16 of the reality television series Dancing with the Stars; becoming the second-youngest pro dancer in the show's history at the time. She was partnered with professional boxer Victor Ortiz. They were eliminated during the sixth week of competition on April 23, 2013, finishing in eighth place. Arnold was demoted to the dance troupe from season 17 through season 20. She was promoted to pro for a second time for season 21 and was partnered with Legion of Honor recipient Alek Skarlatos. They reached the finale and finished in third place on November 24, 2015.

For season 22, Arnold was paired with Wanya Morris of Boyz II Men. They were eliminated during the semifinals alongside NFL wide receiver Antonio Brown and Sharna Burgess on May 16, 2016, finishing in fourth place. In season 23, Arnold was partnered with NFL wide receiver Calvin Johnson. They reached the finale and finished in third place on November 22, 2016.

The following season, Arnold was paired with former MLB catcher David Ross. They also reached the finale, but were named the runners-up on May 23, 2017, behind former NFL running back Rashad Jennings and Emma Slater. In season 25, Arnold was paired with singer-actor Jordan Fisher. One of the highest-scoring couples in Dancing with the Stars history, they won the competition on November 21, 2017, while setting the record for the most perfect scores earned in a single season, with nine.

For the Athletes season, Arnold was partnered with former NBA center Kareem Abdul-Jabbar. They were eliminated during the second week of competition alongside Notre Dame basketball player Arike Ogunbowale and Gleb Savchenko on May 7, 2018, finishing in seventh place. In season 27, Arnold was paired with former NFL linebacker DeMarcus Ware. They were eliminated during the seventh week of competition alongside actor-singer John Schneider and Emma Slater on November 7, 2018, also finishing in seventh place.

During season 28, Arnold was paired with former White House Press Secretary Sean Spicer. Despite consistently earning low scores and criticism from the judges, home audience votes allowed the pair to stay in the competition until they were eliminated during the quarterfinals on November 11, 2019, finishing in sixth place. Arnold returned to the show in season 30 and was partnered with The Bachelor star Matt James. They were eliminated by judges' votes during the fourth week of competition alongside actor Brian Austin Green and Sharna Burgess on October 12, 2021, finishing in twelfth place; Arnold's lowest placement to date.

Season	Partner	Place
16	Victor Ortiz	8th
21	Alek Skarlatos	3rd
22	Wanya Morris	4th
23	Calvin Johnson Jr.	3rd
24	David Ross	2nd
25	Jordan Fisher	1st
26	Kareem Abdul-Jabbar	8th
27	DeMarcus Ware	7th
28	Sean Spicer	6th
30	Matt James	12th

==== Performances ====
Season 16 with celebrity partner Victor Ortiz

Week	Dance	Music	Judges' score			Total Score	Result
Week	Dance	Music	Inaba	Goodman	Tonioli	Total Score	Result
1	Foxtrot	"Daylight" — Maroon 5	6	6	6	18	No Elimination
2	Jive	"Runaway Baby" — Bruno Mars	6	6	6	18	Bottom Two
3	Contemporary	"Slow Dancing in a Burning Room" — John Mayer	8	7	8	23	Safe
4	Paso doble	"We Will Rock You" — Queen	6	6	6	18	Bottom Two
5	Viennese waltz	"Never Tear Us Apart" — INXS	7	7	7	21	Bottom Two
6	Rumba	"I Just Called to Say I Love You" — Stevie Wonder	6	6	6	18	Eliminated
6	Team Paso doble	"Higher Ground" — Stevie Wonder	7	8	7	22	Eliminated

Season 21 with celebrity partner Alek Skarlatos

Week	Dance	Music	Judges' score			Total Score	Result
Week	Dance	Music	Inaba	J. Hough	Tonioli	Total Score	Result
1	Foxtrot	"Ten Feet Tall" — Afrojack, feat. Wrabel	8	7	7	22	No Elimination
2	Jazz	"Don't Stop Believin'" — Journey	8	7	8	23	Safe
2	Quickstep	"American Girl" — Elle King	7	7	8	22	Safe
3	Tango	"Bad Things" — Jace Everett	8	9	8	33 (Note: Alek and Lindsay also received a score of 8 from guest judge Alfonso Ribeiro.)	No Elimination
4	Paso doble	"Wake Me Up" — Avicii	8	8	8	24	Safe
5 (Note: Week 5 was switch-up week. Alek danced a rumba with Emma Slater, while Lindsay danced a quickstep with Carlos PenaVega. Alek's scores with Emma went towards his overall score with Lindsay.)	Rumba	"Let It Go" — James Bay	8	7	7	29 (Note: Alek and Emma also received a score of 7 from guest judge Maksim Chmerkovskiy.)	No Elimination
5	Quickstep	"Bossa Nova Baby" — Elvis Presley	10	10	10	39 (Note: Carlos and Lindsay also received a score of 9 from guest judge Maksim Chmerkovskiy.)	No Elimination
6	Jive	"Jailhouse Rock" — Elvis Presley	8	8	7	30 (Note: Alek and Lindsay also received a score of 7 from guest judge Olivia Newton-John.)	Safe
7	Viennese waltz	"Haunted" — Beyoncé	9	8	8	25	Safe
7	Team Freestyle	"Ghostbusters" — Ray Parker Jr.	9	10	9	28	Safe
8	Contemporary	"Holding Out for a Hero" — Ella Mae Bowen	9	8	8	25	Safe
8	Samba Dance-off	"Lean On" — Major Lazer & DJ Snake, feat. MØ	Loser			0 (Note: Alek and Lindsay did not receive any bonus points for losing the dance-off.)	Safe
9	Salsa	"Back It Up" — Prince Royce, feat. Jennifer Lopez & Pitbull	8	8	8	24	Safe
9	Team-up Paso doble	"We Will Rock You" — Queen (from We Will Rock You)	8	8	8	24	Safe
10 (Semifinals)	Waltz	"America the Beautiful" — Ray Chew	10	10	10	30	No Elimination
10 (Semifinals)	Argentine tango	"Ex's & Oh's" — Elle King	9	9	9	27	No Elimination
10 (Semifinals)	Cha-cha-cha Dance-off	"Fun" — Pitbull, feat. Chris Brown	Loser			0 (Note: Alek and Lindsay did not receive any bonus points for losing the dance-off.)	No Elimination
11 (Finals)	Rumba	"The Pieces Don't Fit Anymore" — James Morrison	9	9	9	27	Safe
11 (Finals)	Freestyle	"Marchin On" — OneRepublic	10	10	10	30	Safe
11 (Finals)	Rumba & Tango Fusion	"A Sky Full of Stars" — Coldplay	9	9	9	27	Third Place

Notes

Season 22 with celebrity partner Wanya Morris

Week	Dance	Music	Judges' score			Total Score	Result
Week	Dance	Music	Inaba	Goodman	Tonioli	Total Score	Result
1	Cha-cha-cha	"Motownphilly" — Boyz II Men	8	7	8	23	No Elimination
2	Salsa	"Echa Pa'lla (Manos Pa'rriba)" — Pitbull	8	8	8	24	Safe
3	Waltz	"The Star-Spangled Banner" — Boyz II Men	8	8	8	24	Safe
4	Samba	"Circle of Life (District 78 remix)" — District 78	8	9	9	35 (Note: Wanyá and Lindsay also received a score of 9 from guest judge Zendaya.)	Safe
5 (Note: Week 5 was switch-up week. Wanyá danced a tango with Witney Carson, while Lindsay danced a jive with Von Miller. Wanyá's scores with Witney went towards his overall score with Lindsay.)	Tango	"Hold Back the River" — James Bay	8	7	8	30 (Note: Wanyá and Witney also received a score of 7 from guest judge Maksim Chmerkovskiy.)	No Elimination
5	Jive	"Hips" — Beans & Fatback	8	7	7	29 (Note: Von and Lindsay also received a score of 7 from guest judge Maksim Chmerkovskiy.)	No Elimination
6	Jazz	"Bye Bye Bye" — NSYNC	10	9	10	29	Safe
7	Foxtrot	"I Say a Little Prayer" — Aretha Franklin	9	9	9	27	Safe
7	Team Freestyle	"Super Bad" "Living in America" "I Got You (I Feel Good)" — James Brown	9	9	10	28	Safe
8	Jive	"Can You Do This" — Aloe Blacc	8	8	9	25	Safe
8	Samba	"Jump in the Line (Shake, Senora)" — Harry Belafonte	10	—N/a	10	29 (Note: Due to Len Goodman designing the team-up dance, he did not score it. Instead, the general public as able to give a score out of 10. They gave Wanyá and Lindsay a score of 9.)	Safe
9 (Semifinals)	Paso doble	"Explosive" — David Garrett & Royal Philharmonic Orchestra	10	10	10	30	Eliminated
9 (Semifinals)	Charleston	"Shame on Me" — Avicii, feat. Sterling Fox & Audra Mae	10	10	10	30	Eliminated

Notes

Season 23 with celebrity partner Calvin Johnson Jr.

Week	Dance	Music	Judges' score				Total Score	Result
Week	Dance	Music	Inaba	Goodman	J. Hough	Tonioli	Total Score	Result
1	Cha-cha-cha	"That's What I Like" — Flo Rida, feat. Fitz	7	6	6	7	26	No Elimination
2	Foxtrot	"As Days Go By" — Jesse Frederick	7	7	7	7	28	Safe
3	Viennese waltz	"Woman's World" — BJ the Chicago Kid	8	8	8	8	32	Safe
4	Charleston	"Bella Donna Twist" — Raphaël Beau	8	—N/a	7	8	23 (Note: Due to Len Goodman's absence, scores were given on a 30 point scale.)	Safe
5	Jazz	"Ain't No Mountain High Enough" — Marvin Gaye & Tammi Terrell	8	—N/a	8	8	24 (Note: Due to Len Goodman's absence, scores were given on a 30 point scale.)	No Elimination
6	Argentine tango	"Hotel California" — Eagles	9	—N/a	9	9	37 (Note: Calvin and Lindsay also received a score of 10 from guest judge Pitbull.)	Safe
7	Jive	"Good Golly, Miss Molly" — Little Richard	9	9	9	9	36	Safe
7	Team Freestyle	"The Skye Boat Song" — Raya Yarbrough	10	9	9	10	38	Safe
8	Quickstep	"Dr. Bones" — Cherry Poppin' Daddies	10	—N/a	10	10	30 (Note: Due to Len Goodman's absence, scores were given on a 30 point scale.)	Safe
8	Jive Dance-off	"The Purple People Eater" — Sheb Wooley	Loser				0 (Note: Calvin and Lindsay did not receive any bonus points for losing the dance-off.)	Safe
9	Waltz	"Memory" — Leona Lewis	9	—N/a	10	9	37 (Note: Calvin and Lindsay also received a score of 9 from guest judge Idina Menzel.)	Safe
9	Team-up Paso doble	"No Good" — Kaleo	9	—N/a	10	9	37 (Note: The team-up dance also received a score of 9 from guest judge Idina Menzel.)	Safe
10 (Semifinals)	Tango	"Seven Nation Army" — The White Stripes	8	—N/a	9	9	26 (Note: Due to Len Goodman's absence, scores were given on a 30 point scale.)	Safe
10 (Semifinals)	Salsa	"Limbo" — Daddy Yankee	10	—N/a	10	10	30 (Note: Due to Len Goodman's absence, scores were given on a 30 point scale.)	Safe
11 (Finals)	Viennese waltz	"I Am Your Man" — Ryan Shaw	8	9	9	9	35	Safe
11 (Finals)	Freestyle	"I Want You Back" — The Jackson 5 "Please Mr. Postman" — The Marvelettes	10	10	10	10	40	Safe
11 (Finals)	Jive & Quickstep Fusion	"Tutti Frutti" — Little Richard	10	10	10	10	40	Third Place

Notes

Season 24 with celebrity partner David Ross

Week	Dance	Music	Judges' score				Total Score	Result
Week	Dance	Music	Inaba	Goodman	J. Hough	Tonioli	Total Score	Result
1	Quickstep	"Go, Cubs, Go" — Steve Goodman	7	7	7	7	28	No Elimination
2	Cha-cha-cha	"Bust a Move" — Young MC	7	6	7	7	27	Safe
3	Jazz	"Candy Shop" — 50 Cent, feat. Olivia	8	7	8	8	31	Safe
4	Viennese waltz	"Forever Young" — Youth Group	7	8	8	8	31	Safe
5	Jive	"Ride" — ZZ Ward	7	7	8	7	29	Safe
6	Argentine tango	"I Want You Back" — NSYNC	7	8	—N/a	7	29 (Note: David and Lindsay also received a score of 8 from guest judge Nick Carter.)	Safe
6	Team Freestyle	"Dancing Machine" — The Jackson 5 "You Got It (The Right Stuff)" — New Kids on the Block "Best Song Ever" — One Direction	8	9	—N/a	8	33 (Note: The team dance also received a score of 9 from guest judge Nick Carter.)	Safe
7	Salsa	"Universal Mind Control" — Common, feat. Pharrell Williams	8	8	—N/a	8	32 (Note: David and Lindsay also received a score of 8 from guest judge Mandy Moore.)	Safe
7	Jive Dance-off	"Gimme Some Lovin'" — The Spencer Davis Group	Loser				0 (Note: David and Lindsay did not receive any bonus points for losing the dance-off.)	Safe
8	Waltz	"Humble and Kind" — Tim McGraw	9	9	9	9	36	Safe
8	Paso doble	"Gangsta's Paradise" — 2WEI	7	7	8	7	29	Safe
9 (Semifinals)	Foxtrot	"You Make Me Feel So Young" — Michael Bublé	9	8	9	8	34	Safe
9 (Semifinals)	Tango	"Castle on the Hill" — Ed Sheeran	9	9	9	9	36	Safe
10 (Finals)	Viennese waltz	"Let's Hurt Tonight" — OneRepublic	8	8	9	8	33	Safe
10 (Finals)	Freestyle	"It Takes Two" — Rob Base and DJ E-Z Rock "Take Me Out to the Ball Game" — Ronnie Neuman	10	10	10	10	40	Safe
10 (Finals)	Foxtrot & Salsa Fusion	"Living" —Bakermat, feat. Alex Clare	9	9	9	9	36	Runners-up

Notes

Season 25 with celebrity partner Jordan Fisher

Week	Dance	Music	Judges' score			Total Score	Result
Week	Dance	Music	Inaba	Goodman	Tonioli	Total Score	Result
1	Tango	"There's Nothing Holdin' Me Back" — Shawn Mendes	8	7	7	22	No Elimination
2	Viennese waltz	"Count on Me" — Judah Kelly	8	8	8	24	Safe
2	Samba	"Mi Gente" — J Balvin & Willy William	8	8	8	24	Safe
3	Charleston	"The Glory Days" — Michael Giacchino	9	7	9	25	No Elimination
4	Contemporary	"Take Me Home" — Us the Duo	10	9	10	29	Safe
5	Foxtrot	"You're Welcome" — Jordan Fisher, feat. Lin-Manuel Miranda	10	10	10	30	Safe
6	Rumba	"Supermarket Flowers" — Ed Sheeran	10	9	10	39 (Note: Jordan and Lindsay also received a score of 10 from guest judge Shania Twain.)	Safe
7	Paso doble	"Animals" — Martin Garrix	10	10	10	30	Safe
7	Team Freestyle	"Monster Mash" — Atwater Men's Club	8	8	8	24	Safe
8	Quickstep	"Chuck Berry" — Pharrell Williams	10	10	10	30	Safe
8	Salsa	"Que Viva La Vida" — Wisin	10	10	10	30	Safe
9 (Semifinals)	Argentine tango	"Brother" — NEEDTOBREATHE, feat. Gavin DeGraw	9	9	10	28	Safe
9 (Semifinals)	Jive	"Proud Mary" — Tina Turner	10	10	10	30	Safe
10 (Finals)	Charleston	"Bad Man" — Pitbull, feat. Robin Thicke, Joe Perry & Travis Barker	10	10	10	40 (Note: Jordan and Lindsay also received a score of 10 from guest judge Julianne Hough.)	Safe
10 (Finals)	Freestyle	"Puttin' on the Ritz 2017 (Jazzy Radio Mix)" — Taco, feat. tomX	10	10	10	40 (Note: Jordan and Lindsay also received a score of 10 from guest judge Julianne Hough.)	Safe
10 (Finals)	Samba	"Mi Gente" — J Balvin & Willy William	10	10	10	30	Winners
10 (Finals)	Paso doble & Salsa Fusion	"Kill the Lights" — Alex Newell, Jess Glynne & DJ Cassidy with Nile Rodgers	10	10	10	30	Winners

Notes

Season 26 with celebrity partner Kareem Abdul-Jabbar

Week	Dance	Music	Judges' score			Total Score	Result
Week	Dance	Music	Inaba	Goodman	Tonioli	Total Score	Result
1	Cha-cha-cha	"Signed, Sealed, Delivered I'm Yours" — Stevie Wonder	6	5	6	17	Safe
2	Salsa	"La malanga" — Eddie Palmieri	7	6	6	26 (Note: Kareem and Lindsay also received a score of 7 from guest judge Rashad Jennings.)	Eliminated
2	Team Freestyle	"...Baby One More Time" — The Baseballs	8	8	8	33 (Note: The team dance also received a score of 9 from guest judge Rashad Jennings.)	Eliminated

Notes

Season 27 with celebrity partner DeMarcus Ware

Week	Dance	Music	Judges' score			Total Score	Result
Week	Dance	Music	Inaba	Goodman	Tonioli	Total Score	Result
1	Cha-cha-cha	"Sweet Sensation" — Flo Rida	8	7	8	23	Safe
2	Foxtrot	"The Boy from New York City" — The Manhattan Transfer	8	8	8	24	No Elimination
2	Quickstep	"Ladies Man" — Boyz II Men	8	7	8	23	Safe
3	Argentine tango	"Lux Aeterna" — Clint Mansell & Kronos Quartet	9	8	9	26	Safe
4	Paso doble	"Fire" — Barns Courtney	7	7	8	22	Safe
5	Charleston	"A Star Is Born" — Alan Menken & David Zippel	9	8	9	26	No Elimination
6	Salsa	"Under Your Spell" — Leo Soul	8	9	9	26	Safe
7	Viennese waltz	"Tennessee Whiskey" — Chris Stapleton	9	9	9	27	Eliminated
7	Team Freestyle	"Country Girl (Shake It for Me)" — Luke Bryan	9	8	9	26	Eliminated

Season 28 with celebrity partner Sean Spicer

Week	Dance	Music	Judges' score			Total Score	Result
Week	Dance	Music	Inaba	Goodman	Tonioli	Total Score	Result
1	Salsa	"Spice Up Your Life" — Spice Girls	4	4	4	12	No Elimination
2	Tango	"Shut Up and Dance" — Walk the Moon	6	5	5	16	Safe
3	Cha-cha-cha	"Night Fever" — Bee Gees	5	5	5	15	Safe
4	Paso doble	"Bamboléo" — Gipsy Kings	5	5	5	21 (Note: Sean and Lindsay also received a score of 6 from guest judge Leah Remini.)	Safe
5	Quickstep	"You've Got a Friend in Me" — Randy Newman	7	6	6	19	No Elimination
6	Viennese waltz	"Somebody to Love" — Queen	7	7	7	21	Safe
7	Jive	"Monster Mash" — Bobby Pickett	6	6	6	18	Safe
7	Team Freestyle	"Sweet Dreams" — Beyoncé	8	8	8	24	Safe
8 (Note: Due to Lindsay's absence, Sean danced with Jenna Johnson.)	Jazz	"Come Sail Away" — Styx	7	7	6	20	Safe
8	Cha-cha-cha Dance-off	"Gonna Make You Sweat (Everybody Dance Now)" — C+C Music Factory	Loser			0 (Note: Sean and Jenna did not receive any bonus points for losing the dance-off.)	Safe
9 (Note: Due to Lindsay's absence, Sean danced with Jenna Johnson.)	Argentine tango	"Bills, Bills, Bills" — Destiny's Child	7	6	6	26 (Note: Sean and Jenna also received a score of 7 from guest judge Joey Fatone.)	Eliminated
9	Foxtrot	"Story of My Life" — One Direction	6	6	6	24 (Note: Sean and Jenna also received a score of 6 from guest judge Joey Fatone.)	Eliminated

Notes

Season 30 with celebrity partner Matt James

Week	Dance	Music	Judges' score				Total Score	Result
Week	Dance	Music	Inaba	Goodman	D. Hough	Tonioli	Total Score	Result
1	Cha-cha-cha	"Give It to Me Baby" — Rick James	6	6	6	6	24	No Elimination
2	Samba	"Levitating" — Dua Lipa	5	5	6	6	22	Safe
3	Tango	"Scream & Shout" — Britney Spears with Will.i.am	7	6	—N/a	7	20 (Note: Due to Derek Hough's absence, scores were given on a 30 point scale.)	Safe
4	Quickstep	"The Incredits" — Michael Giacchino	6	6	7	7	26	No Elimination
4	Paso doble	"Jungle" — X Ambassadors & Jamie N Commons	8	7	8	8	31	Eliminated

=== 2018–present: Business ventures ===
In 2018, Arnold launched L.A.C, a namesake lifestyle brand of makeup, cosmetics, and accessories. She later became a certified personal trainer and founded The Movement Club, an on-demand fitness and wellness program, in December 2020 during the COVID-19 pandemic.

== Personal life ==
Arnold is a member of the Church of Jesus Christ of Latter-day Saints. She announced her engagement to her high school sweetheart, Samuel Cusick, in December 2014 during a trip to Tanzania. They married on June 18, 2015, in a private ceremony at the Salt Lake Temple. Arnold and Cusick have three children together: two daughters born in November 2020 and May 2023, and a son born in June 2026. All of their children were delivered via Caesarean section.

Awards and achievements
Preceded by Rashad Jennings & Emma Slater	Dancing with the Stars (US) winner Season 25 (Fall 2017 with Jordan Fisher)	Succeeded by Adam Rippon & Jenna Johnson
Preceded by James Hinchcliffe & Sharna Burgess	Dancing with the Stars (US) runner-up Season 24 (Spring 2017 with David Ross)	Succeeded by Lindsey Stirling & Mark Ballas
Preceded by Noah Galloway & Sharna Burgess; Ginger Zee & Valentin Chmerkovskiy	Dancing with the Stars (US) third place contestant Season 21 (Fall 2015 with Alek Skarlatos); Season 23 (Fall 2016 with Calvin Johnson Jr.)	Succeeded by Ginger Zee & Valentin Chmerkovskiy; Normani Kordei & Valentin Chmerkovskiy
Preceded by Carlos PenaVega & Witney Carson	Dancing with the Stars (US) semi-finalist Season 22 (Spring 2016 with Wanya Morris)	Succeeded by Jana Kramer & Gleb Savchenko
