= Noah Galloway =

American former soldier and motivational speaker

- Born: Noah Matthew Galloway; October 28, 1981 (age 45); Birmingham, Alabama, U.S.
- Spouse: Amanda Galloway
- Children: 4
- Military career
- Allegiance: United States
- Branch: United States Army
- Service years: 2001–2006
- Rank: Sergeant
- Units: 1st Battalion; 502nd Infantry; 101st Airborne Division
- Conflicts: Iraq War
- Awards: Purple Heart
- Other work: Motivational speaker; Extreme sports enthusiast
- Website: noahgalloway.com

Noah Matthew Galloway (born October 28, 1981) is a former United States Army soldier, motivational speaker, and extreme sports enthusiast. He was injured during the Iraq War, losing his left arm above the elbow and left leg above the knee. He was a contestant on Dancing with the Stars season 20, paired with Sharna Burgess. The pair finished in third place. He led his team to victory in the first season of the American Grit TV show on FOX. His book Living with No Excuses: The Remarkable Rebirth of an American Soldier was released in August 2016. Made an appearance on the Cross Over with Ted Davis, Dario Melendez and Armen Saryan on May 8, 2020. An Emmy award sports talk radio show based in Milwaukee, WI. He enjoys playing golf and throwing darts at different breweries in and around Birmingham, AL.

== Early life ==
Galloway was born in Birmingham, Alabama, the son of Andy Galloway and Bebe Galloway. When Galloway was young, his father had an accident and lost his hand, but was able to work construction. Galloway said that his father was able to give him advice when he was injured, and understood his depression and mistakes. Galloway's family's background is Scottish. He has competed in sports events wearing a tartan kilt. Galloway said that his family has a history of serving in the military.

== Career ==
=== Military ===
Galloway joined the military in 2001 after 9/11. He was a Sergeant assigned to the 1st Battalion of the 502nd Infantry, 101st Airborne Division at Fort Campbell, Kentucky, during Operation Iraqi Freedom. On December 19, 2005, during his second deployment, he was severely injured in an IED attack in Yusafiah, Iraq. He lost his left arm above the elbow and his left leg above the knee; his right leg and jaw were badly injured, the latter having to be wired shut. He was unconscious for five days, and later was moved to Walter Reed Army Medical Center in Washington, D.C. for further treatment and rehabilitation.

=== Fitness competitions ===
After leaving the Army, and going through an extended period of depression and addictions, first to pills, then to alcohol, with encouragement of his friend Eric Eisenberg who fits prosthetic devices at BioTech Limb & Brace, Galloway began focusing on fitness, reconnecting with his passion for sports that he had from his childhood and before his injury. Galloway eventually became a personal trainer. He participated in a variety of fitness competitions from regular 5K and 10K races to ones such as Tough Mudders, CrossFit competitions and Spartan events. Galloway was part of Operation Enduring Warrior, a non-profit organization that helps veterans via sports. Galloway was part of a team attempting to climb Carstensz Pyramid in Indonesia. Galloway said that social media helped him stay inspired to participate in the competitions and events.

=== Motivational speaker ===
He is also a motivational speaker, addressing audiences of veterans, school children, and others with his message of "no excuses". Galloway appeared on the November 2014 cover of Men's Health magazine, the first reader to be selected for the magazine's cover, and was named the publication's "Ultimate Men's Health Guy". He has been a guest on The Ellen DeGeneres Show and The Today Show. In 2015, Galloway was featured on the cover of U.S. Veterans Magazine Summer issue.

=== Brand sponsorship ===
In October 2014, Galloway became the spokesman and model for Kenneth Cole's new fragrance Mankind Ultimate. More recently, Galloway became a brand ambassador for Armitron Watches. Both he and Armitron champion the No Excuses Charitable Fund which empowers injured veterans through support of physical rehabilitative services.

== Dancing with the Stars ==
In 2015, Galloway was chosen as a contestant on Dancing with the Stars (season 20), and was paired with professional dancer and choreographer Sharna Burgess. While Galloway experimented with a prosthetic arm for his Argentine tango, he and Burgess decided not to use it, ultimately not using it in any of his dances. The producers told him before the competition began that he would not be assigned the jive or quickstep, since the quick, repetitive motions required for those dances would be too painful. On May 19, 2015, Galloway and Burgess finished the competition in third place losing to Riker Lynch and Rumer Willis who took second and first place, respectively.

Week #	Dance/Song	Judges' score				Result
Week #	Dance/Song	Inaba	Goodman	Hough	Tonioli	Result
1	Cha-Cha-Cha/ "I Lived"	7	6	6	7	No Elimination
2	Samba/ "Homegrown Honey"	7	6	7	7	Safe
3	Argentine Tango/"Rather Be"	7	7	8	8	Safe
4	Contemporary/"American Soldier"	8	8	8	8	Safe
5	Foxtrot/"A Whole New World"	7	7	7	7	Safe
6	Rumba/"Waves"; Freestyle: Team YOLO/"Wipe Out"	7; 10	7; 9	7; 10	8; 10	Safe
7	Jazz/Era:1970's "Super Bad"; Cha-Cha-Cha/"Dance with Me"	10; Awarded	8; 2	9 Extra	9 Points	Safe
8	Tango/"Geronimo"; Salsa/"Mr. Put It Down"	8; 8	7; 8	8; 8	8; 8	Safe
9 Semi-Finals	Viennese Waltz/"The Time of My Life"; Paso Doble/"Unstoppable" (E.S. Posthumus)	9 –	9; 10	9; 10	9; 10	Safe
10; Finals	Argentine Tango/"Rather Be"; Freestyle/"Titanium" and "Fix You"; Argentine Tango & Cha-Cha-Cha Fusion / "Surrender"	8; 10; 9	8; 10; 9	8; 10; 9	8; 10; 9	Third Place

== Television appearances ==
List of television appearances and roles
Year	Title	Role	Notes
2013	True Life	Himself	Episode: "I'm Doing A Tough Mudder"
2014, 2015	The Ellen DeGeneres Show	Himself	Aired on: October 24, 2014
2015	Entertainment Tonight	Himself	Aired on: February 24, 2015, March 17, 2015
2015	Dancing with the Stars	Himself/Contestant	Third Place
2015	Good Morning America	Himself	Aired on: March 30, 2015
2015	Extra	Himself	
2015	CMT Music Awards	Himself/Award Presenter	
2015	The Home and Family Show	Himself	
2015	The View	Himself	
2016	American Grit	Himself	He is one of the four Cadre training the contestants. His team won first place.

== Charity work ==
Galloway founded the No Excuses Charitable Fund. The fund, which assists organizations he feels are important, has aided Operation Enduring Warrior and also local programs including those for children at the YMCA of the town where he lives, Alabaster, Alabama.

In June 2016, Galloway accompanied high school students from Alabaster, Alabama's Thompson High School on a mission to Jutiapa, Honduras, to help provide computer labs as well as installing water chlorinators for fresh water.

== Personal life ==
After an eight-month courtship, Galloway married Amanda in June 2021. He is the father of four children. His oldest son, Colston, is from his first marriage. His son Jack and daughter Rian, are from his second marriage in 2007. That marriage also ended in divorce. His youngest, Matthew, was born on November 8, 2022.

During the semi-finals of Dancing with the Stars, Galloway proposed to his girlfriend (later fiancée), Jamie Boyd, on air. On Monday, October 26, 2015, Galloway announced the end of the engagement. In late 2020, Noah began dating Amanda, whom he had met on a trip to New York City some years earlier. The relationship culminated in marriage in June 2021. The couple were wed in Calera, Alabama. On November 8, 2022, Noah and Amanda welcomed a son, Matthew Quin Galloway.

In September 2015, as part of the Homes for Our Troops program and a Specially Adapted Housing Grant from the Veterans Administration, Galloway was given a mortgage-free home that is adaptable to wheelchairs, which he sometimes needs, as well as other features needed for amputees. The organization also provides veterans with financial planning assistance. Galloway had volunteered for the organization as a builder volunteer starting in 2010.

== Works and publications ==
- Galloway, Noah; Baer, Rebecca Angel (2016). Living with No Excuses: The Remarkable Rebirth of an American Soldier. New York: Center Street. ISBN 978-1-45-559693-5. OCLC 932173890.
