= EGC =

EGC may refer to:

== Companies ==
- E. Gluck Corporation, an American watch company
- Electrical Guitar Company, an American guitar company

== Education ==
- Eastern Goldfields Colledge, a high school in Kalgoorlie
- El Nasr Girls' College, in Alexandria, Egypt

== Geography ==
- East Greenland Current

== Law ==
- General Court (European Union)

== Organisations ==
- Ecclesia Gnostica Catholica, a Gnostic church organization
- Église Gnostique Catholique, a French Gnostic church organisation
- European Green Coordination, a predecessor of the European Green Party

== Places ==
- Bergerac Dordogne Périgord Airport, in France

== Science ==
- Embryonic germ cell
- Eosinophilic granuloma complex
- Epigallocatechin

== Sports ==
- European Gliding Championships
- European Go Championship, or European Go Congress

== Other uses ==
- Equipment Ground Conductor, equipment bonding conductor
