= Dancing with the Stars (American TV series) season 25 =

Season of television series

Dancing with the Stars
- Season 25
- Promotional poster featuring pro dancers Sharna Burgess and Alan Bersten
- Hosted by: Tom Bergeron; Erin Andrews
- Judges: Carrie Ann Inaba; Len Goodman; Bruno Tonioli
- Celebrity winner: Jordan Fisher
- Professional winner: Lindsay Arnold
- No. of episodes: 12

Release
- Original network: ABC
- Original release: September 18 – November 21, 2017

Season chronology
- ← Previous; Season 24 Next → Season 26

Season twenty-five of Dancing with the Stars premiered on September 18, 2017, on the ABC network.

On November 21, 2017, actor and singer Jordan Fisher and Lindsay Arnold were crowned the champions, while violinist Lindsey Stirling and Mark Ballas finished in second place, and actor Frankie Muniz and Witney Carson finished in third.

== Cast ==
=== Couples ===
This season featured thirteen celebrity contestants. Good Morning America announced the professional dancers who would be competing in the upcoming season on August 27, 2017. Alan Bersten, a member of the troupe since season 20, was promoted to pro. Drew Scott was announced as the first celebrity competing for the season, partnered with Emma Slater. On September 6, the rest of the cast was revealed on Good Morning America.

Celebrity	Notability	Professional partner	Status	Ref.
Barbara Corcoran	Shark Tank panelist & businesswoman	Keo Motsepe	Eliminated 1st on September 25, 2017	
Debbie Gibson	Singer-songwriter & Broadway actress	Alan Bersten	Eliminated 2nd on September 26, 2017	
Derek Fisher	NBA point guard	Sharna Burgess	Eliminated 3rd on October 9, 2017	
Sasha Pieterse	Pretty Little Liars actress	Gleb Savchenko	Eliminated 4th on October 16, 2017	
Nick Lachey	98 Degrees singer	Peta Murgatroyd	Eliminated 5th on October 23, 2017	
Nikki Bella	WWE Diva Search contestant & WWE wrestler	Artem Chigvintsev	Eliminated 6th & 7th on October 30, 2017	
Vanessa Lachey	Actress & television host	Maksim Chmerkovskiy; Alan Bersten (Week 3)	Eliminated 6th & 7th on October 30, 2017	
Terrell Owens	NFL wide receiver	Cheryl Burke	Eliminated 8th on November 6, 2017	
Victoria Arlen	Paralympic swimmer & ESPN host	Valentin Chmerkovskiy	Eliminated 9th on November 13, 2017	
Drew Scott	Property Brothers co-host	Emma Slater	Eliminated 10th on November 20, 2017	
Frankie Muniz	Actor & race car driver	Witney Carson	Third place on November 21, 2017	
Lindsey Stirling	Violinist & composer	Mark Ballas	Runners-up on November 21, 2017	
Jordan Fisher	Actor & singer	Lindsay Arnold	Winners on November 21, 2017	

=== Hosts and judges ===
Tom Bergeron and Erin Andrews returned as hosts, while Carrie Ann Inaba, Len Goodman, and Bruno Tonioli returned as judges. Julianne Hough did not return as a permanent judge this season, though she did return as a guest judge during the first night of the finals. On October 23, singer Shania Twain joined the panel as a guest judge.

=== Dance troupe ===
The troupe consisted of former pros Sasha Farber and Jenna Johnson, and prior troupe members Artur Adamski, Brandon Armstrong, Hayley Erbert, and Britt Stewart.

== Episodes ==
No. overall	No. in season	Title	Rating (18–49)	Original release date	U.S. viewers (millions)
411	1	"First Dances"	1.63	September 18, 2017	10.71
412	2	"Ballroom"	1.35	September 25, 2017	8.67
413	3	"Latin"	1.17	September 26, 2017	7.22
414	4	"Guilty Pleasures Night"	1.43	October 2, 2017	9.06
415	5	"Most Memorable Year Night"	1.30	October 9, 2017	9.25
416	6	"Disney Night"	1.45	October 16, 2017	9.57
417	7	"A Night at the Movies"	1.27	October 23, 2017	9.15
418	8	"Halloween Night"	1.45	October 30, 2017	9.93
419	9	"Quarterfinals"	1.20	November 6, 2017	9.30
420	10	"Semifinals"	1.45	November 13, 2017	9.88
421	11	"Finals: Night 1"	1.41	November 20, 2017	10.08
422	12	"Finals: Night 2"	1.33	November 21, 2017	9.20

== Scoring chart ==
The highest score each week is indicated in bold green with a dagger (†), while the lowest score each week is indicated in italicized red with a double-dagger (‡).

Color key:

Winners
Runners-up
Third place
Eliminated

Dancing with the Stars (season 25) - Weekly scores
Couple	Pl.	Week												
Couple	Pl.	1	2		3	4	3+4	5	6 (Note: The couples were scored on a 40-point scale due to the presence of a guest judge.)	7	8	9	10	
Couple	Pl.	1	Night 1	Night 2	3	4	3+4	5	6	7	8	9	Night 1	Night 2
Jordan & Lindsay	1st	**22**†	**24**†	24	25	**29**†	**54**†	**30**†	39	30+24=54	30+30=**60**†	28+30=**58**†	40+40=**80**†	+30+30=**140**† (Note: This couple finished in first place.)
Lindsey & Mark	2nd	**22**†	21	24	**27**†	26	53	28	**40**†	27+24=51	26+28=54	29+28=57	40+40=**80**†	+30+30=**140**† (Note: This couple finished in second place.)
Frankie & Witney	3rd	19	23	**25**†	21	24	45	29	31	30+30=**60**†	26+27=53	25+26=51	38+38=76	+30+28=134‡ (Note: This couple finished in third place.)
Drew & Emma	4th	16	20	21	23	24	47	25	30	27+30=57	22+25=47‡	24+24=48‡	36+39=75‡ (Note: This couple was eliminated.)	
Victoria & Val	5th	19	**24**†	20	22	27	49	27	31	27+30=57	24+24=48	27+29=56		
Terrell & Cheryl	6th	15	20	19	21	24	45	25	37	25+24=49	27+24=51			
Nikki & Artem	7th	20	21	18‡	21	24	45	27	36	24+24=48‡				
Vanessa & Maks	7th	21	**24**†	23	23	24	47	24	36	24+30=54				
Nick & Peta	9th	18	19	19	21	22‡	43‡	22‡	26‡					
Sasha & Gleb	10th	18	23	22	19‡	24	43‡	24						
Derek & Sharna	11th	18	19	19	21	23	44							
Debbie & Alan	12th	17	20	21										
Barbara & Keo	13th	14‡	17‡											

== Weekly scores ==
Individual judges' scores in the charts below (given in parentheses) are listed in this order from left to right: Carrie Ann Inaba, Len Goodman, Bruno Tonioli.

=== Week 1: First Dances ===
Couples are listed in the order they performed.

Couple	Scores	Dance	Music
Terrell & Cheryl	15 (5, 5, 5)	Cha-cha-cha	"Ain't Too Proud to Beg" — The Temptations
Debbie & Alan	17 (6, 5, 6)	Foxtrot	"Lost in Your Eyes" — Debbie Gibson
Sasha & Gleb	18 (6, 6, 6)	Cha-cha-cha	"Like That" — Fleur East
Drew & Emma	16 (6, 5, 5)	Foxtrot	"Our House" — Madness
Barbara & Keo	14 (5, 4, 5)	Salsa	"Money Maker" — Ludacris, feat. Pharrell Williams
Jordan & Lindsay	22 (8, 7, 7)	Tango	"There's Nothing Holdin' Me Back" — Shawn Mendes
Nick & Peta	18 (6, 6, 6)	Cha-cha-cha	"Come Get It Bae" — Pharrell Williams
Vanessa & Maks	21 (7, 7, 7)	Cha-cha-cha	"Woman" — Kesha, feat. The Dap-Kings Horns
Frankie & Witney	19 (7, 6, 6)	Foxtrot	"Sign of the Times" — Harry Styles
Nikki & Artem	20 (7, 7, 6)	Tango	"So What" — Pink
Derek & Sharna	18 (6, 6, 6)	Salsa	"Basketball" — Kurtis Blow
Victoria & Val	19 (7, 6, 6)	Cha-cha-cha	"Born Ready" — The Disco Fries, feat. Hope Murphy
Lindsey & Mark	22 (7, 8, 7)	Cha-cha-cha	"Don't Worry" — Madcon, feat. Ray Dalton

=== Week 2: Ballroom Night & Latin Night ===
The couples had to prepare two new dances to be performed on two consecutive nights. On Monday, the couples performed an unlearned ballroom routine, with one couple being eliminated at the end of the show. On Tuesday, the remaining couples performed an unlearned Latin routine, with another couple being eliminated. Couples are listed in the order they performed.

Night 1 (Ballroom)

Couple	Scores	Dance	Music	Result
Debbie & Alan	20 (7, 6, 7)	Quickstep	"This Is My Time" — Amy Stroup	Safe
Nikki & Artem	21 (7, 7, 7)	Waltz	"Come Away with Me" — Norah Jones	Safe
Lindsey & Mark	21 (7, 7, 7)	Quickstep	"Swing Set" — Jurassic 5	Safe
Barbara & Keo	17 (6, 5, 6)	Tango	"Whatever Lola Wants" — Sarah Vaughan	Eliminated
Nick & Peta	19 (7, 6, 6)	Foxtrot	"Mandy" — Barry Manilow	Safe
Drew & Emma	20 (7, 6, 7)	Quickstep	"Sing, Sing, Sing (With a Swing)" — Louis Prima	Safe
Vanessa & Maks	24 (8, 8, 8)	Foxtrot	"Hit Me with a Hot Note" — Tami Tappan Damiano	Safe
Frankie & Witney	23 (8, 7, 8)	Tango	"Whatever It Takes" — Imagine Dragons	Safe
Terrell & Cheryl	20 (7, 6, 7)	Foxtrot	"Pillowtalk" — ZAYN	Safe
Sasha & Gleb	23 (8, 8, 7)	Viennese waltz	"I'm Going Down" — Rose Royce	Safe
Victoria & Val	24 (8, 8, 8)	Tango	"Look What You Made Me Do" — Taylor Swift	Safe
Derek & Sharna	19 (6, 6, 7)	Foxtrot	"Hallelujah I Love Her So" — Ray Charles	Safe
Jordan & Lindsay	24 (8, 8, 8)	Viennese waltz	"Count on Me" — Judah Kelly	Safe

Night 2 (Latin)

Couple	Scores	Dance	Music	Result
Nikki & Artem	18 (6, 6, 6)	Samba	"Despacito" — Luis Fonsi, feat. Daddy Yankee	Safe
Victoria & Val	20 (7, 6, 7)	Rumba	"Easy" — Sky Ferreira	Safe
Derek & Sharna	19 (7, 6, 6)	Paso doble	"Diablo Rojo" — Rodrigo y Gabriela	Safe
Sasha & Gleb	22 (8, 7, 7)	Samba	"Most Girls" — Hailee Steinfeld	Safe
Nick & Peta	19 (7, 6, 6)	Argentine tango	"She's a Lady" — Lion Babe	Safe
Jordan & Lindsay	24 (8, 8, 8)	Samba	"Mi Gente" — J Balvin & Willy William	Safe
Drew & Emma	21 (7, 7, 7)	Rumba	"Lights Down Low" — MAX, feat. gnash	Safe
Debbie & Alan	21 (7, 7, 7)	Argentine tango	"Havana" — Camila Cabello, feat. Young Thug	Eliminated
Vanessa & Maks	23 (8, 8, 7)	Salsa	"Instruction" — Jax Jones, feat. Demi Lovato & Stefflon Don	Safe
Terrell & Cheryl	19 (6, 6, 7)	Samba	"Hot in Herre" — Nelly	Safe
Lindsey & Mark	24 (8, 8, 8)	Salsa	"Mani Picao" — Ricky Campanelli	Safe
Frankie & Witney	25 (8, 8, 9)	Cha-cha-cha	"Perm" — Bruno Mars	Safe

=== Week 3: Guilty Pleasures Night ===
The couples performed one unlearned dance to a song that reminded them of their secret guilty pleasure. Couples are listed in the order they performed.

At the start of the show, a moment of silence was held to honor the victims of the 2017 Las Vegas shooting, which had occurred the previous day. It was announced at the beginning of the show that, due to the tragedy, no elimination would take place.

Vanessa Lachey performed with Alan Bersten this week while Maksim Chmerkovskiy was absent dealing with a "personal matter".

Couple	Scores	Dance	Music
Drew & Emma	23 (8, 7, 8)	Argentine tango	"Red Right Hand" — Nick Cave and the Bad Seeds
Derek & Sharna	21 (7, 7, 7)	Cha-cha-cha	"The Fresh Prince of Bel-Air" — DJ Jazzy Jeff & The Fresh Prince
Victoria & Val	22 (8, 7, 7)	Quickstep	"Tubthumping" — Chumbawamba
Vanessa & Alan	23 (7, 8, 8)	Jazz	"Girls Just Want to Have Fun" — Cyndi Lauper
Nikki & Artem	21 (7, 7, 7)	Viennese waltz	"Love on the Brain" — Rihanna
Frankie & Witney	21 (7, 7, 7)	Samba	"It's Gonna Be Me" — NSYNC
Lindsey & Mark	27 (9, 9, 9)	Jive	"Wake Me Up Before You Go-Go" — Wham!
Sasha & Gleb	19 (7, 6, 6)	Jazz	"I Can't Help Myself (Sugar Pie Honey Bunch)" — The Four Tops
Nick & Peta	21 (7, 7, 7)	Jazz	"Jump (For My Love)" — The Pointer Sisters
Terrell & Cheryl	21 (7, 7, 7)	Salsa	"The Breaks" — Kurtis Blow
Jordan & Lindsay	25 (9, 7, 9)	Charleston	"The Glory Days" — Michael Giacchino

=== Week 4: Most Memorable Year Night ===
The couples danced one unlearned dance to celebrate the most memorable year of their lives. Couples are listed in the order they performed.

Couple	Scores	Dance	Music	Result
Frankie & Witney	24 (8, 8, 8)	Quickstep	"Adventure of a Lifetime" — Coldplay	Safe
Terrell & Cheryl	24 (8, 8, 8)	Viennese waltz	"I Have Nothing" — Whitney Houston	Safe
Nikki & Artem	24 (8, 8, 8)	Contemporary	"Fight Song" — Rachel Platten	Safe
Nick & Peta	22 (8, 7, 7)	Contemporary	"Falling Slowly" — Glen Hansard & Markéta Irglová	Safe
Lindsey & Mark	26 (9, 8, 9)	Viennese waltz	"Anchor" — Mindy Gledhill	Safe
Derek & Sharna	23 (7, 8, 8)	Jazz	"Move On Up" — Curtis Mayfield	Eliminated
Jordan & Lindsay	29 (10, 9, 10)	Contemporary	"Take Me Home" — Us the Duo	Safe
Sasha & Gleb	24 (8, 8, 8)	Foxtrot	"Over My Head (Cable Car)" — The Fray	Safe
Vanessa & Maks	24 (8, 8, 8)	Rumba	"Godspeed (Sweet Dreams)" — Nick Lachey	Safe
Drew & Emma	24 (8, 8, 8)	Jive	"Don't Stop Me Now" — Queen	Safe
Victoria & Val	27 (9, 9, 9)	Foxtrot	"I Lived" — OneRepublic	Safe

=== Week 5: Disney Night ===
The couples performed one unlearned dance to a song from a Disney film. All performances were chronological based on when the films were released.

Couple	Scores	Dance	Music	Disney film	Result
Victoria & Val	27 (9, 9, 9)	Jazz	"Steamboat Willie Suite" — Wilfred Jackson & Bert Lewis	Steamboat Willie	Safe
Vanessa & Maks	24 (8, 8, 8)	Waltz	"Un jour mon prince viendra" — Nikki Yanofsky	Snow White and the Seven Dwarfs	Safe
Lindsey & Mark	28 (9, 10, 9)	Foxtrot	"When You Wish Upon a Star" — Ray Chew	Pinocchio	Safe
Nick & Peta	22 (7, 8, 7)	Quickstep	"The Bare Necessities" — Phil Harris & Bruce Reitherman	The Jungle Book	Safe
Drew & Emma	25 (9, 8, 8)	Viennese waltz	"Rainbow Connection" — Kermit the Frog	The Muppet Movie	Safe
Sasha & Gleb	24 (8, 8, 8)	Rumba	"Kiss the Girl" — Samuel E. Wright	The Little Mermaid	Eliminated
Terrell & Cheryl	25 (9, 8, 8)	Quickstep	"I Just Can't Wait to Be King" — Jason Weaver, Rowan Atkinson & Laura Williams	The Lion King	Safe
Frankie & Witney	29 (10, 9, 10)	Argentine tango	"Angelica" — Rodrigo y Gabriela	Pirates of the Caribbean: On Stranger Tides	Safe
Jordan & Lindsay	30 (10, 10, 10)	Foxtrot	"You're Welcome" — Jordan Fisher, feat. Lin-Manuel Miranda	Moana	Safe
Nikki & Artem	27 (9, 9, 9)	Jazz	"Remember Me" — Benjamin Bratt	Coco	Safe

=== Week 6: A Night at the Movies ===
Individual judges' scores in the chart below (given in parentheses) are listed in this order from left to right: Carrie Ann Inaba, Len Goodman, Shania Twain, Bruno Tonioli.

The couples performed one unlearned dance, capturing the spirit of a specific movie genre. Couples are listed in the order they performed.

Couple	Scores	Dance	Music	Genre	Result
Nikki & Artem	36 (9, 9, 9, 9)	Argentine tango	"Dernière danse" — Indila	Foreign	Safe
Drew & Emma	30 (7, 7, 9, 7)	Paso doble	"Legend" — The Score	Action	Safe
Nick & Peta	26 (7, 6, 7, 6)	Samba	"Wild Wild West" — Will Smith, feat. Dru Hill & Kool Moe Dee	Western	Eliminated
Victoria & Val	31 (8, 8, 7, 8)	Paso doble	"We Will Rock You" — Queen	Sports	Safe
Terrell & Cheryl	37 (9, 9, 10, 9)	Jive	"Feel It Still" — Portugal. The Man	Spy	Safe
Frankie & Witney	31 (7, 8, 8, 8)	Jazz	"Holly Rock" — Sheila E.	Animation	Safe
Vanessa & Maks	36 (9, 9, 9, 9)	Quickstep	"Let's Be Bad" — Smash cast, feat. Megan Hilty	Musical	Safe
Jordan & Lindsay	39 (10, 9, 10, 10)	Rumba	"Supermarket Flowers" — Ed Sheeran	Drama	Safe
Lindsey & Mark	40 (10, 10, 10, 10)	Argentine tango	"Human" — Sevdaliza	Sci-fi	Safe

=== Week 7: Halloween Night ===
The couples performed one unlearned dance and a team dance. Couples are listed in the order they performed. Two couples were eliminated at the end of the night.

Couple	Scores	Dance	Music	Result
Victoria & Val	27 (9, 9, 9)	Viennese waltz	"The Night We Met" — Lord Huron	Safe
Jordan & Lindsay	30 (10, 10, 10)	Paso doble	"Animals" — Martin Garrix	Safe
Nikki & Artem	24 (8, 8, 8)	Jive	"I Put a Spell on You" — Bette Midler	Eliminated
Vanessa & Maks	24 (8, 8, 8)	Paso doble	"Game of Survival" — Ruelle	Eliminated
Terrell & Cheryl	25 (8, 8, 9)	Tango	"Super Freak" — Rick James	Safe
Lindsey & Mark	27 (9, 9, 9)	Paso doble	"Roundtable Rival" — Lindsey Stirling	Safe
Frankie & Witney	30 (10, 10, 10)	Contemporary	"Every Breath You Take" — Chase Holfelder	Safe
Drew & Emma	27 (9, 9, 9)	Charleston	"Remains of the Day" — Danny Elfman	Safe
Jordan & Lindsay Lindsey & Mark Nikki & Artem Terrell & Cheryl	24 (8, 8, 8)	Freestyle (Team Monster Mash)	"Monster Mash" — Atwater Men's Club	
Drew & Emma Frankie & Witney Vanessa & Maks Victoria & Val	30 (10, 10, 10)	Freestyle (Team Phantom of the Ballroom)	"The Phantom of the Opera" — Sarah Brightman & Michael Crawford	

=== Week 8: Quarterfinals ===
The couples performed an unlearned dance and a trio dance. The trio partners were past celebrity winners or finalists. Couples are listed in the order they performed.

Couple	Trio partner	Scores	Dance	Music	Result
Terrell & Cheryl	Kelly Monaco	27 (9, 9, 9)	Charleston	"Bad Boy Good Man" — Tape Five, feat. Henrik Wager	Eliminated
Terrell & Cheryl	Kelly Monaco	24 (8, 8, 8)	Rumba	"Slow Hands" — Niall Horan	Eliminated
Drew & Emma	Rashad Jennings	22 (7, 7, 8)	Waltz	"Both Sides Now (Torch Songs)" — Years & Years	Safe
Drew & Emma	Rashad Jennings	25 (9, 8, 8)	Cha-cha-cha	"Get Up Offa That Thing" — James Brown	Safe
Victoria & Val	Laurie Hernandez	24 (8, 8, 8)	Argentine tango	"Down" — Marian Hill	Safe
Victoria & Val	Laurie Hernandez	24 (8, 8, 8)	Jive	"Magic" — B.o.B, feat. Rivers Cuomo	Safe
Lindsey & Mark	Kristi Yamaguchi	26 (9, 8, 9)	Samba	"Morning Drums" — Gregor Salto	Safe
Lindsey & Mark	Kristi Yamaguchi	28 (10, 9, 9)	Jazz	"Let's Face the Music and Dance" — Seth MacFarlane	Safe
Frankie & Witney	Alfonso Ribeiro	26 (9, 8, 9)	Viennese waltz	"Perfect" — Ed Sheeran	Safe
Frankie & Witney	Alfonso Ribeiro	27 (9, 9, 9)	Jive	"Good Place" — Leo Soul	Safe
Jordan & Lindsay	Corbin Bleu	30 (10, 10, 10)	Quickstep	"Chuck Berry" — Pharrell Williams	Safe
Jordan & Lindsay	Corbin Bleu	30 (10, 10, 10)	Salsa	"Que Viva La Vida" — Wisin	Safe

=== Week 9: Semifinals ===
The couples performed an unlearned dance using music chosen by the pros, as well as a dance that reinterpreted an iconic routine from a previous season. Couples are listed in the order they performed.

Couple	Scores	Dance	Music	Result
Drew & Emma	24 (8, 8, 8)	Tango	"I'm Gonna Be (500 Miles)" — The Proclaimers	Safe
Drew & Emma	24 (8, 8, 8)	Jazz	"Yeah!" — Usher, feat. Lil Jon & Ludacris	Safe
Victoria & Val	27 (9, 9, 9)	Contemporary	"To Build a Home" — The Cinematic Orchestra, feat.g Patrick Watson	Eliminated
Victoria & Val	29 (9, 10, 10)	Charleston	"Bang Bang" — will.i.am	Eliminated
Jordan & Lindsay	28 (9, 9, 10)	Argentine tango	"Brother" — NEEDTOBREATHE, feat. Gavin DeGraw	Safe
Jordan & Lindsay	30 (10, 10, 10)	Jive	"Proud Mary" — Tina Turner	Safe
Lindsey & Mark	29 (10, 9, 10)	Contemporary	"Head High" — Alexander Jean	Safe
Lindsey & Mark	28 (9, 9, 10)	Tango	"Feel So Close" — Calvin Harris	Safe
Frankie & Witney	25 (8, 8, 9)	Salsa	"Shake" — Yin Yang Twins, feat. Pitbull	Safe
Frankie & Witney	26 (9, 8, 9)	Paso doble	"Carnaval de Paris" — Dario G	Safe

=== Week 10: Finals ===
Individual judges' scores in the chart below (given in parentheses) are listed in this order from left to right: Carrie Ann Inaba, Len Goodman, Julianne Hough (Night 1 only), Bruno Tonioli.

On the first night, the couples performed a redemption dance and their freestyle routine. On the second night, the final three couples performed their favorite routine and a fusion dance of two previously-learned dance styles. Couples are listed in the order they performed.

Night 1

Couple	Scores	Dance	Music	Result
Drew & Emma	36 (9, 9, 9, 9)	Paso doble	"Get Ready" — Rayelle	Eliminated
Drew & Emma	39 (9, 10, 10, 10)	Freestyle	"The Ding-Dong Daddy of the D-Car Line" — Cherry Poppin' Daddies	Eliminated
Frankie & Witney	38 (10, 9, 10, 9)	Foxtrot	"I Won't Dance" — Frank Sinatra	Safe
Frankie & Witney	38 (9, 9, 10, 10)	Freestyle	"Run Boy Run" — Woodkid	Safe
Jordan & Lindsay	40 (10, 10, 10, 10)	Charleston	"Bad Man" — Pitbull, feat. Robin Thicke, Joe Perry & Travis Barker	Safe
Jordan & Lindsay	40 (10, 10, 10, 10)	Freestyle	"Puttin' on the Ritz 2017 (Jazzy Radio Mix)" — Taco, feat. tomX	Safe
Lindsey & Mark	40 (10, 10, 10, 10)	Quickstep	"Barflies at the Beach" — Royal Crown Revue	Safe
Lindsey & Mark	40 (10, 10, 10, 10)	Freestyle	"Palladio" — Escala	Safe

Night 2

Couple	Scores	Dance	Music	Result
Lindsey & Mark	30 (10, 10, 10)	Jive	"Wake Me Up Before You Go-Go" — Wham!	Runners-up
Lindsey & Mark	30 (10, 10, 10)	Cha-cha-cha & Tango	"Hot2Touch" — Felix Jaehn, feat. Hight & Alex Aiono	Runners-up
Frankie & Witney	30 (10, 10, 10)	Argentine tango	"Angelica" — Rodrigo y Gabriela	Third place
Frankie & Witney	28 (10, 9, 9)	Foxtrot & Tango	"Without You" — Avicii, feat. Sandro Cavazza	Third place
Jordan & Lindsay	30 (10, 10, 10)	Samba	"Mi Gente" — J Balvin & Willy William	Winners
Jordan & Lindsay	30 (10, 10, 10)	Paso doble & Salsa	"Kill the Lights" — Alex Newell, Jess Glynne & DJ Cassidy with Nile Rodgers	Winners

== Dance chart ==
The celebrities and professional partners danced one of these routines for each corresponding week:

- Weeks 1–6: One unlearned dance
- Week 7: One unlearned dance & team dance
- Week 8: One unlearned dance & trio dance
- Week 9 (Semifinals): Two unlearned dances
- Week 10 (Finals, Night 1): Redemption dance & freestyle
- Week 10 (Finals, Night 2): Favorite dance & fusion dance

Color key:

No scores received

Dancing with the Stars (season 25) - Dance chart
Couple	Week																
Couple	1	2		3	4	5	6	7		8		9		10			
Couple	1	Night 1	Night 2	3	4	5	6	7		8		9		Night 1		Night 2	
Jordan & Lindsay	Tango	Viennese waltz	Samba	Charleston	Contemp.	Foxtrot	Rumba	Paso doble	Team Freestyle	Quickstep	Salsa	Argentine tango	Jive	Charleston	Freestyle	Samba	Paso doble & Salsa
Lindsey & Mark	Cha-cha-cha	Quickstep	Salsa	Jive	Viennese waltz	Foxtrot	Argentine tango	Paso doble	Team Freestyle	Samba	Jazz	Contemp.	Tango	Quickstep	Freestyle	Jive	Cha-cha-cha & Tango
Frankie & Witney	Foxtrot	Tango	Cha-cha-cha	Samba	Quickstep	Argentine tango	Jazz	Contemp.	Team Freestyle	Viennese waltz	Jive	Salsa	Paso doble	Foxtrot	Freestyle	Argentine tango	Foxtrot & Tango
Drew & Emma	Foxtrot	Quickstep	Rumba	Argentine tango	Jive	Viennese waltz	Paso doble	Charleston	Team Freestyle	Waltz	Cha-cha-cha	Tango	Jazz	Paso doble	Freestyle		Jive (Note: This couple danced, but received no scores.)
Victoria & Val	Cha-cha-cha	Tango	Rumba	Quickstep	Foxtrot	Jazz	Paso doble	Viennese waltz	Team Freestyle	Argentine tango	Jive	Contemp.	Charleston				
Terrell & Cheryl	Cha-cha-cha	Foxtrot	Samba	Salsa	Viennese waltz	Quickstep	Jive	Tango	Team Freestyle	Charleston	Rumba						
Nikki & Artem	Tango	Waltz	Samba	Viennese waltz	Contemp.	Jazz	Argentine tango	Jive	Team Freestyle								
Vanessa & Maks	Cha-cha-cha	Foxtrot	Salsa	Jazz	Rumba	Waltz	Quickstep	Paso doble	Team Freestyle								Quickstep
Nick & Peta	Cha-cha-cha	Foxtrot	Argentine tango	Jazz	Contemp.	Quickstep	Samba										
Sasha & Gleb	Cha-cha-cha	Viennese waltz	Samba	Jazz	Foxtrot	Rumba											
Derek & Sharna	Salsa	Foxtrot	Paso doble	Cha-cha-cha	Jazz												Salsa
Debbie & Alan	Foxtrot	Quickstep	Argentine tango														
Barbara & Keo	Salsa	Tango															
