= Dancing with the Stars (American TV series) season 16 =

Dancing with the Stars
- Season 16
- Promotional poster
- Hosted by: Tom Bergeron; Brooke Burke Charvet
- Judges: Carrie Ann Inaba; Len Goodman; Bruno Tonioli
- Celebrity winner: Kellie Pickler
- Professional winner: Derek Hough
- No. of episodes: 20

Release
- Original network: ABC
- Original release: March 18 – May 21, 2013

Season chronology
- ← Previous; Season 15 Next → Season 17

Season sixteen of Dancing with the Stars premiered on March 18, 2013, on the ABC network.

Country music singer and American Idol finalist Kellie Pickler and Derek Hough were crowned the champions, while Disney Channel star Zendaya and Valentin Chmerkovskiy finished in second place, and Baltimore Ravens wide receiver Jacoby Jones and Karina Smirnoff finished third.

== Cast ==
=== Couples ===
This season featured twelve celebrity contestants. Eleven celebrities and their professional partners were announced on February 26, 2013, on Good Morning America, with Jacoby Jones' participation having been confirmed two days earlier during a network promo that aired during the 85th Oscars. Two weeks following the cast announcement, Sean Lowe as revealed as the twelfth contestant. Lindsay Arnold, a contestant from season nine of So You Think You Can Dance, was introduced as a new professional along with Sharna Burgess, who had been a member of the dance troupe. Gleb Savchenko, who had recently participated as a professional on season twelve of the Australian Dancing with the Stars, was also announced as a new professional. The dance troupe consisted of Oksana Dmytrenko, Henry Byalikov, Emma Slater, and Sasha Farber, along with new members Witney Carson and Julian Tocker.

Celebrity	Notability	Professional partner	Status
Dorothy Hamill	Olympic figure skater	Tristan MacManus	Withdrew on March 26, 2013
Wynonna Judd	Country music singer	Tony Dovolani	Eliminated 1st on April 2, 2013
Lisa Vanderpump	Reality television personality	Gleb Savchenko	Eliminated 2nd on April 9, 2013
D.L. Hughley	Comedian & television actor	Cheryl Burke	Eliminated 3rd on April 16, 2013
Victor Ortiz	Professional boxer	Lindsay Arnold	Eliminated 4th on April 23, 2013
Andy Dick	Actor & comedian	Sharna Burgess	Eliminated 5th on April 30, 2013
Sean Lowe	Reality television personality	Peta Murgatroyd	Eliminated 6th on May 7, 2013
Ingo Rademacher	General Hospital actor	Kym Johnson	Eliminated 7th on May 14, 2013
Alexandra Raisman	Olympic artistic gymnast	Mark Ballas	Eliminated 8th on May 21, 2013
Jacoby Jones	NFL wide receiver	Karina Smirnoff	Third place on May 21, 2013
Zendaya	Disney Channel actress	Valentin Chmerkovskiy	Runners-up on May 21, 2013
Kellie Pickler	Country music singer and American Idol finalist	Derek Hough	Winners on May 21, 2013

=== Host and judges ===
Tom Bergeron and Brooke Burke Charvet returned as co-hosts, while Carrie Ann Inaba, Len Goodman, and Bruno Tonioli returned as judges. The Harold Wheeler orchestra and singers also returned to provide the music throughout the season.

== Scoring chart ==
The highest score each week is indicated in bold green with a dagger (†), while the lowest score each week is indicated in italicized red with a double-dagger (‡).

Color key:

Winners
Runners-up
Third place
Bottom two
Withdrew from competition
Eliminated

Dancing with the Stars (season 16) - Weekly scores
Couple	Pl.	Week											
Couple	Pl.	1	2	1+2	3	4	5	6	7	8	9	10	
Couple	Pl.	1	2	1+2	3	4	5	6	7	8	9	Night 1	Night 2
Kellie & Derek	1st	21	**26**†	47	25	26	27	29+25=**54**†	29	28+27=55	30+28=58	30+4+30=64	+30=94 (Note: This couple finished in first place.)
Zendaya & Val	2nd	**24**†	**26**†	**50**†	24+2=**26**†	26	**29**†	29+22=51	27+3=30	28+30=**58**†	25+30=55	30+5+30=**65**†	+30=**95**† (Note: This couple finished in second place.)
Jacoby & Karina	3rd	20	23	43	24+2=**26**†	24	26	23+22=45	27	27+25=52	30+29=**59**†	27+2+27=56‡	+30=86‡ (Note: This couple finished in third place.)
Alexandra & Mark	4th	21	24	45	23	**27**†	25	27+25=52	29+3=**32**†	29+27=56	30+29=**59**†	28+3+30=61 (Note: This couple was eliminated.)	
Ingo & Kym	5th	20	20	40	21	23	21	24+22=46	22+3=25 (Note: This couple was in the bottom two, but was not eliminated.)	24+24=48	24+27=51‡		
Sean & Peta	6th	19	20	39	21	20	24	21+25=46	24	21+21=42‡			
Andy & Sharna	7th	17	20	37	18	21	18‡	18+25=43	17‡				
Victor & Lindsay	8th	18	18	36	23	18‡	21	18+22=40‡					
D.L. & Cheryl	9th	12‡	16	28‡	16	21	18‡						
Lisa & Gleb	10th	18	18	36	21	18‡							
Wynonna & Tony	11th	18	18	36	15‡								
Dorothy & Tristan	12th	21	15‡	36 (Note: This couple withdrew from the competition.)									

== Weekly scores ==
Individual judges' scores in the charts below (given in parentheses) are listed in this order from left to right: Carrie Ann Inaba, Len Goodman, Bruno Tonioli.

=== Week 1: First Dances ===
Couples performed either the cha-cha-cha, contemporary, or the foxtrot, and are listed in the order they performed.

Couple	Scores	Dance	Music
Kellie & Derek	21 (7, 7, 7)	Cha-cha-cha	"Domino" — Jessie J
Victor & Lindsay	18 (6, 6, 6)	Foxtrot	"Daylight" — Maroon 5
Ingo & Kym	20 (7, 6, 7)	Contemporary	"Yellow" — Coldplay
Lisa & Gleb	18 (6, 6, 6)	Foxtrot	"Ac-Cent-Tchu-Ate the Positive" — Aretha Franklin
D.L. & Cheryl	12 (4, 4, 4)	Cha-cha-cha	"Low" — Flo Rida, feat. T-Pain
Zendaya & Val	24 (8, 8, 8)	Contemporary	"Feel Again" — OneRepublic
Sean & Peta	19 (7, 6, 6)	Foxtrot	"The Power of Love" — Huey Lewis and the News
Alexandra & Mark	21 (7, 7, 7)	Cha-cha-cha	"Live While We're Young" — One Direction
Dorothy & Tristan	21 (7, 7, 7)	Contemporary	"Tiny Dancer" — Elton John
Wynonna & Tony	18 (6, 6, 6)	Cha-cha-cha	"I've Got the Music in Me" — Kiki Dee
Andy & Sharna	17 (6, 5, 6)	Foxtrot	"Witchcraft" —Frank Sinatra
Jacoby & Karina	20 (7, 6, 7)	Cha-cha-cha	"Good Feeling" — Flo Rida

=== Week 2: First Elimination ===
Couples performed either jazz, the jive, or the quickstep, and are listed in the order they performed.

At the results show of this week, it was announced that Dorothy Hamill would be withdrawing from the show due to an injury she had suffered from during training prior to this week.

Couple	Scores	Dance	Music	Result
Ingo & Kym	20 (6, 7, 7)	Quickstep	"Billy-A-Dick" — Bette Midler	Safe
Dorothy & Tristan	15 (5, 5, 5)	Jive	"Chantilly Lace" — The Big Bopper	Withdrew
Jacoby & Karina	23 (8, 7, 8)	Jazz	"Five Guys Named Moe" — Louis Jordan	Safe
Victor & Lindsay	18 (6, 6, 6)	Jive	"Runaway Baby" — Bruno Mars	Bottom two
Wynonna & Tony	18 (6, 6, 6)	Quickstep	"Neutron Dance" — The Pointer Sisters	Safe
Zendaya & Val	26 (9, 8, 9)	Jive	"This Head I Hold" — Electric Guest	Safe
Andy & Sharna	20 (7, 6, 7)	Jazz	"Poker Face" — Lady Gaga	Safe
Sean & Peta	20 (7, 6, 7)	Jive	"Into Action" — Tim Armstrong, feat. Skye Sweetnam	Safe
Alexandra & Mark	24 (8, 8, 8)	Quickstep	"Jumpin' Jack" — Big Bad Voodoo Daddy	Safe
Lisa & Gleb	18 (6, 6, 6)	Jive	"One Way or Another (Teenage Kicks)" — One Direction	Bottom two
D.L. & Cheryl	16 (5, 5, 6)	Quickstep	"It Don't Mean a Thing" — Duke Ellington	Safe
Kellie & Derek	26 (9, 8, 9)	Jazz	"Lights" — Ellie Goulding	Safe

=== Week 3: Prom Night ===
All couples participated in a team freestyle, where Jacoby & Karina and Zendaya & Val each received two bonus points, plus one unlearned dance. Couples are listed in the order they performed.

Couple	Scores	Dance	Music	Result
Alexandra & Mark	23 (7, 8, 8)	Viennese waltz	"Give Me Love" — Ed Sheeran	Safe
Andy & Sharna	18 (6, 6, 6)	Cha-cha-cha	"Da Ya Think I'm Sexy?" — Rod Stewart	Bottom two
Ingo & Kym	21 (7, 7, 7)	Paso doble	"Another One Bites the Dust" — Queen	Safe
Lisa & Gleb	21 (7, 7, 7)	Viennese waltz	"I Have Nothing" — Whitney Houston	Safe
Kellie & Derek	25 (8, 9, 8)	Jive	"Footloose" — Kenny Loggins	Safe
Victor & Lindsay	23 (8, 7, 8)	Contemporary	"Slow Dancing in a Burning Room" — John Mayer	Safe
D.L. & Cheryl	16 (6, 5, 5)	Salsa	"Get Up (I Feel Like Being a) Sex Machine" — James Brown	Safe
Jacoby & Karina	24 (8, 8, 8)	Rumba	"Stay" — Rihanna, feat. Mikky Ekko	Safe
Wynonna & Tony	15 (5, 5, 5)	Samba	"Pour Some Sugar on Me" — Def Leppard	Eliminated
Sean & Peta	21 (7, 7, 7)	Cha-cha-cha	"YMCA" — Village People	Safe
Zendaya & Val	24 (8, 8, 8)	Viennese waltz	"Que Sera, Sera (Whatever Will Be, Will Be)" — Doris Day	Safe
Jacoby & Karina	2	Group; Freestyle	"The Rockafeller Skank" — Fatboy Slim	
Zendaya & Val	2	Group; Freestyle	"The Rockafeller Skank" — Fatboy Slim	
Alexandra & Mark Andy & Sharna D.L. & Cheryl Ingo & Kym Kellie & Derek Lisa & Gleb Sean & Peta Victor & Lindsay Wynonna & Tony	No scores received	Group; Freestyle	"The Rockafeller Skank" — Fatboy Slim	

=== Week 4: Best Year of My Life Night ===
Couples performed one unlearned dance celebrating the most memorable year of their lives. Each celebrity included a brief solo during their routines. Kyle Jacobs, Kellie Pickler's husband, performed his own song that he wrote for Kellie. Couples are listed in the order they performed.

Couple	Scores	Dance	Music	Result
Sean & Peta	20 (6, 7, 7)	Viennese waltz	"I Won't Give Up" — Jason Mraz	Safe
Victor & Lindsay	18 (6, 6, 6)	Paso doble	"We Will Rock You" — Queen	Bottom two
Jacoby & Karina	24 (8, 8, 8)	Foxtrot	"Watching You" — Rodney Atkins	Safe
Alexandra & Mark	27 (9, 9, 9)	Contemporary	"Titanium" — David Guetta, feat. Sia	Safe
Andy & Sharna	21 (7, 7, 7)	Viennese waltz	"Hallelujah" — Leonard Cohen	Safe
Zendaya & Val	26 (9, 8, 9)	Samba	"Love On Top" — Beyoncé	Safe
Ingo & Kym	23 (8, 7, 8)	Viennese waltz	"A Thousand Years" — Christina Perri	Safe
D.L. & Cheryl	21 (7, 7, 7)	Foxtrot	"I Just Want to Make Love to You" — Etta James	Safe
Kellie & Derek	26 (9, 8, 9)	Rumba	"Say I Do" — Kyle Jacobs	Safe
Lisa & Gleb	18 (6, 6, 6)	Cha-cha-cha	"Celebration" — Kool & the Gang	Eliminated

=== Week 5: Len's Side-by-Side Challenge ===
Each couple had to select two other professionals that had either been eliminated, participated in previous seasons, or participated in the troupe; and then perform simultaneously with those professional dancers. Couples are listed in the order they performed.

Couple	Professionals	Scores	Dance	Music	Result
Ingo & Kym	Tony Dovolani & Emma Slater	21 (7, 7, 7)	Cha-cha-cha	"Lady Marmalade" — Labelle	Safe
Jacoby & Karina	Maksim Chmerkovskiy & Anna Trebunskaya	26 (9, 8, 9)	Jive	"Long Tall Sally" — Little Richard	Safe
Victor & Lindsay	Tristan MacManus & Emma Slater	21 (7, 7, 7)	Viennese waltz	"Never Tear Us Apart" — INXS	Bottom two
Alexandra & Mark	Witney Carson & Tony Dovolani	25 (8, 8, 9)	Samba	"Misery" — Maroon 5	Safe
Sean & Peta	Chelsie Hightower & Tristan MacManus	24 (8, 8, 8)	Quickstep	"Go Get It" — DJ Sepalot, feat. Ladi6	Safe
Kellie & Derek	Henry Byalikov & Anna Trebunskaya	27 (9, 9, 9)	Foxtrot	"It Had to Be You" — Harry Connick Jr.	Safe
D.L. & Cheryl	Sasha Farber & Chelsie Hightower	18 (6, 6, 6)	Tango	"Love Letter" — Clairy Browne & the Bangin' Rackettes	Eliminated
Zendaya & Val	Maksim Chmerkovskiy & Anna Trebunskaya	29 (10, 9, 10)	Argentine tango	"Discombobulate" — Hans Zimmer	Safe
Andy & Sharna	Sasha Farber & Emma Slater	18 (6, 6, 6)	Paso doble	"The Plaza of Execution" — James Horner	Safe

=== Week 6: Stevie Wonder Night ===
Each couple danced to a song by Stevie Wonder. Each couple also performed a team dance picked by the highest scoring couples: Zendaya & Val (Team Paso doble) and Kellie & Derek (Team Samba). Couples are listed in the order they performed.

Couple	Scores	Dance	Stevie Wonder music	Result
Zendaya & Val	29 (10, 9, 10)	Cha-cha-cha	"Do I Do"	Safe
Andy & Sharna	18 (6, 6, 6)	Samba	"Signed, Sealed, Delivered I'm Yours"	Safe
Sean & Peta	21 (7, 7, 7)	Samba	"I Wish"	Bottom two
Alexandra & Mark	27 (9, 9, 9)	Foxtrot	"Isn't She Lovely"	Safe
Ingo & Kym	24 (8, 8, 8)	Tango	"Uptight (Everything's Alright)"	Safe
Kellie & Derek	29 (9, 10, 10)	Quickstep	"Part-Time Lover"	Safe
Victor & Lindsay	18 (6, 6, 6)	Rumba	"I Just Called to Say I Love You"	Eliminated
Jacoby & Karina	23 (8, 7, 8)	Quickstep	"For Once in My Life"	Safe
Ingo & Kym Jacoby & Karina Victor & Lindsay Zendaya & Val	22 (7, 8, 7)	Team; Paso doble	"Higher Ground"	
Alexandra & Mark Andy & Sharna Kellie & Derek Sean & Peta	25 (8, 9, 8)	Team; Samba	"Superstition"	

=== Week 7: Latin Night ===
Each couple danced to a Latin hit. After having danced, the top scoring couple was saved from elimination that week. The remaining six couples then took part in a dance-off, where they competed against another couple doing the cha-cha-cha, jive, or rumba. For each dance-off, the judges chose a winning couple and added three bonus points to their scores. Couples are listed in the order they performed.

Couple	Scores	Dance	Music	Result
Jacoby & Karina	27 (9, 9, 9)	Salsa	"Danza Kuduro" — Don Omar, feat. Lucenzo	Safe
Ingo & Kym	22 (7, 8, 7)	Rumba	"Maria Maria" — Santana, feat. The Product G&B	Bottom two
Kellie & Derek	29 (9, 10, 10)	Samba	"Shake Your Bon-Bon" — Ricky Martin	Immunity
Andy & Sharna	17 (5, 6, 6)	Rumba	"Cherry Pink (and Apple Blossom White)" — Perez Prado	Eliminated
Alexandra & Mark	29 (10, 9, 10)	Salsa	"Echa Pa'lla (Manos Pa'rriba)" — Pitbull, feat. Papayo	Safe
Sean & Peta	24 (8, 8, 8)	Rumba	"Hero" — Enrique Iglesias	Safe
Zendaya & Val	27 (9, 9, 9)	Paso doble	"Buster Voodoo" — Rodrigo y Gabriela	Safe

Dance-offs
Couple	Dance	Music	Result
Alexandra & Mark	Cha-cha-cha	"Brokenhearted" — Karmin	Winners
Andy & Sharna	Cha-cha-cha	"Brokenhearted" — Karmin	Losers
Zendaya & Val	Jive	"Good Golly Miss Molly" — Little Richard	Winners
Jacoby & Karina	Jive	"Good Golly Miss Molly" — Little Richard	Losers
Ingo & Kym	Rumba	"Apologize" — OneRepublic	Winners
Sean & Peta	Rumba	"Apologize" — OneRepublic	Losers

=== Week 8: Trio Night ===
Each couple performed one unlearned ballroom dance as well as a trio dance. Each couple chose one professional who was either previously eliminated or had participated in the dance troupe to perform with them. Couples are listed in the order they performed.

Couple	Trio partner	Scores	Dance	Music	Result
Zendaya & Val	Gleb Savchenko	28 (9, 10, 9)	Foxtrot	"Don't Worry, Be Happy" — Bobby McFerrin	Safe
Zendaya & Val	Gleb Savchenko	30 (10, 10, 10)	Salsa	"Dança Molengo" — Bonde do Rolê, feat. Rizzle Kicks	Safe
Sean & Peta	Sharna Burgess	21 (7, 7, 7)	Tango	"Hot n Cold" — Katy Perry	Eliminated
Sean & Peta	Sharna Burgess	21 (7, 7, 7)	Jazz	"Magic" — B.o.B, feat. Rivers Cuomo	Eliminated
Jacoby & Karina	Cheryl Burke	27 (9, 9, 9)	Viennese waltz	"It's a Man's, Man's, Man's World" — James Brown	Safe
Jacoby & Karina	Cheryl Burke	25 (8, 9, 8)	Paso doble	"La Virgen de la Macarena" — Canadian Brass	Safe
Ingo & Kym	Lindsay Arnold	24 (8, 8, 8)	Foxtrot	"You Make Me Feel So Young" — Frank Sinatra	Safe
Ingo & Kym	Lindsay Arnold	24 (8, 8, 8)	Jive	"Dance With Me Tonight" — Olly Murs	Safe
Kellie & Derek	Tristan MacManus	28 (9, 9, 10)	Viennese waltz	"Fade Into You" — Mazzy Star	Safe
Kellie & Derek	Tristan MacManus	27 (10, 7, 10)	Paso doble	"Unstoppable" — E.S. Posthumus	Safe
Alexandra & Mark	Henry Byalikov	29 (9, 10, 10)	Argentine tango	"Reflejo de luna" — Alacran	Safe
Alexandra & Mark	Henry Byalikov	27 (9, 9, 9)	Jive	"Hit the Road Jack" — Ray Charles	Safe

=== Week 9: Semifinals ===
Each couple performed two unlearned dances, one of which was chosen by the viewers through Twitter. Couples are listed in the order they performed.

Couple	Scores	Dance	Music	Result
Kellie & Derek	30 (10, 10, 10)	Argentine tango	"Para Te" — Appart	Safe
Kellie & Derek	28 (9, 10, 9)	Flamenco	"The Pirate That Should Not Be" — Rodrigo y Gabriela	Safe
Ingo & Kym	24 (8, 8, 8)	Samba	"One More Night" — Maroon 5	Eliminated
Ingo & Kym	27 (9, 9, 9)	Charleston	"Fat Sam's Grand Slam" — from Bugsy Malone	Eliminated
Alexandra & Mark	30 (10, 10, 10)	Rumba	"When I Was Your Man" — Bruno Mars	Safe
Alexandra & Mark	29 (10, 9, 10)	Afro-jazz	"Azumba" —Gregor Salto	Safe
Jacoby & Karina	30 (10, 10, 10)	Argentine tango	"Concierto para quinteto" — Astor Piazolla	Safe
Jacoby & Karina	29 (10, 9, 10)	Lindy Hop	"The Ding-Dong Daddy of the D-Car Line" — Cherry Poppin' Daddies	Safe
Zendaya & Val	25 (8, 8, 9)	Quickstep	"Don't Give Up" — Noisettes	Safe
Zendaya & Val	30 (10, 10, 10)	Hip-hop	"Fine China" — Chris Brown	Safe

=== Week 10: Finals ===
On night one, each couple performed a dance chosen by one of the judges, a cha-cha-cha relay, and a supersized freestyle routine. On night two, one of the four couples was eliminated, and the remaining three couples then performed an instant dance of a style that they had already learned with music given to them just minutes before. Couples are listed in the order they performed.

Night 1

Couple	Scores	Dance	Music	Result
Jacoby & Karina	27 (9, 9, 9)	Jive	"Shake It" — Metro Station	Safe
Jacoby & Karina	27 (9, 9, 9)	Freestyle	"Can't Hold Us" — Macklemore & Ryan Lewis	Safe
Alexandra & Mark	28 (9, 9, 10)	Samba	"Hips Don't Lie" — Shakira, feat. Wyclef Jean	Eliminated
Alexandra & Mark	30 (10, 10, 10)	Freestyle	"Icarus" — Madeon	Eliminated
Kellie & Derek	30 (10, 10, 10)	Quickstep	"Peppy and George" — Ludovic Bource	Safe
Kellie & Derek	30 (10, 10, 10)	Freestyle	"Beneath Your Beautiful" — Labrinth, feat. Emeli Sandé	Safe
Zendaya & Val	30 (10, 10, 10)	Samba	"Yerbatero" — Juanes	Safe
Zendaya & Val	30 (10, 10, 10)	Freestyle	"Beauty and a Beat" — Justin Bieber, feat. Nicki Minaj	Safe
Jacoby & Karina	2	Cha-cha-cha; Relay	"Treasure" — Bruno Mars	
Alexandra & Mark	3	Cha-cha-cha; Relay	"Treasure" — Bruno Mars	
Kellie & Derek	4	Cha-cha-cha; Relay	"Treasure" — Bruno Mars	
Zendaya & Val	5	Cha-cha-cha; Relay	"Treasure" — Bruno Mars	

Night 2

Couple	Scores	Dance	Music	Result
Jacoby & Karina	30 (10, 10, 10)	Salsa	"Aguanilé" — Héctor Lavoe	Third place
Kellie & Derek	30 (10, 10, 10)	Jive	"Keep A-Knockin'" — Little Richard	Winners
Zendaya & Val	30 (10, 10, 10)	Jive	"Rockin' Robin" — Michael Jackson	Runners-up

== Dance chart ==
The couples performed the following each week:

- Week 1: One unlearned dance (cha-cha-cha, contemporary, or foxtrot)
- Week 2: One unlearned dance (jazz, jive, or quickstep)
- Week 3: Group dance & one unlearned dance
- Week 4: One unlearned dance
- Week 5: One unlearned dance
- Week 6: One unlearned dance & team dance
- Week 7: One unlearned dance & dance-off
- Week 8: One unlearned dance & trio dance
- Week 9 (Semifinals): One unlearned dance & Twitter-chosen dance
- Week 10 (Finals, Night 1): Judge's choice, cha-cha-cha relay & freestyle
- Week 10 (Finals, Night 2): Instant dance

Dancing with the Stars (season 16) - Dance chart
Couple	Week																	
Couple	1	2	3		4	5	6		7		8		9		10			
Couple	1	2	3		4	5	6		7		8		9		Night 1			Night 2
Kellie & Derek	Cha-cha-cha	Jazz	Group; Freestyle	Jive	Rumba	Foxtrot	Quickstep	Team Samba	Samba	Immunity	Viennese waltz	Paso doble	Argentine tango	Flamenco	Quickstep	Cha-cha-cha; Relay	Freestyle	Jive
Zendaya & Val	Contemp.	Jive	Group; Freestyle	Viennese waltz	Samba	Argentine tango	Cha-cha-cha	Team; Paso doble	Paso doble	Jive	Foxtrot	Salsa	Quickstep	Hip-hop	Samba	Cha-cha-cha; Relay	Freestyle	Jive
Jacoby & Karina	Cha-cha-cha	Jazz	Group; Freestyle	Rumba	Foxtrot	Jive	Quickstep	Team; Paso doble	Salsa	Jive	Viennese waltz	Paso doble	Argentine tango	Lindy Hop	Jive	Cha-cha-cha; Relay	Freestyle	Salsa
Alexandra & Mark	Cha-cha-cha	Quickstep	Group; Freestyle	Viennese waltz	Contemp.	Samba	Foxtrot	Team Samba	Salsa	Cha-cha-cha	Argentine tango	Jive	Rumba	Afro-jazz	Samba	Cha-cha-cha; Relay	Freestyle	
Ingo & Kym	Contemp.	Quickstep	Group; Freestyle	Paso doble	Viennese waltz	Cha-cha-cha	Tango	Team; Paso doble	Rumba	Rumba	Foxtrot	Jive	Samba	Charleston				
Sean & Peta	Foxtrot	Jive	Group; Freestyle	Cha-cha-cha	Viennese waltz	Quickstep	Samba	Team Samba	Rumba	Rumba	Tango	Jazz						
Andy & Sharna	Foxtrot	Jazz	Group; Freestyle	Cha-cha-cha	Viennese waltz	Paso doble	Samba	Team Samba	Rumba	Cha-cha-cha								Jazz
Victor & Lindsay	Foxtrot	Jive	Group; Freestyle	Contemp.	Paso doble	Viennese waltz	Rumba	Team; Paso doble										
D.L. & Cheryl	Cha-cha-cha	Quickstep	Group; Freestyle	Salsa	Foxtrot	Tango												
Lisa & Gleb	Foxtrot	Jive	Group; Freestyle	Viennese waltz	Cha-cha-cha													Foxtrot
Wynonna & Tony	Cha-cha-cha	Quickstep	Group; Freestyle	Samba														
Dorothy & Tristan	Contemp.	Jive																Viennese waltz

== Ratings ==
Show	Episode	Air date	Viewers (millions)	Rating/share (adults 18–49)	Rating/share (household)	Note
1	"Performance Show: Week 1"	March 18, 2013	17.06	3.2/8	10.7/16	
2	"Exclusive First Look"	March 19, 2013	9.76	2.1/6	6.2/10	
3	"Performance Show: Week 2"	March 25, 2013	14.47	2.4/6	9.0/14	
4	"Results Show: Week 2"	March 26, 2013	13.43	2.4/6	8.6/13	
5	"Performance Show: Week 3"	April 1, 2013	13.91	2.2/6	8.9/14	
6	"Results Show: Week 3"	April 2, 2013	13.98	2.3/6	8.8/13	
7	"Performance Show: Week 4"	April 8, 2013	13.15	2.1/6	8.7/13	
8	"Results Show: Week 4"	April 9, 2013	12.13	2.0/5	7.9/12	
9	"Performance Show: Week 5"	April 15, 2013	13.40	2.2/6	8.7/13	
10	"Results Show: Week 5"	April 16, 2013	12.73	2.2/6	8.2/12	
11	"Performance Show: Week 6"	April 22, 2013	13.77	2.1/6	8.8/14	
12	"Results Show: Week 6"	April 23, 2013	12.65	2.0/5	8.0/13	
13	"Performance Show: Week 7"	April 29, 2013	13.45	2.1/6	8.7/13	
14	"Results Show: Week 7"	April 30, 2013	10.89	1.5/4	7.0/11	
15	"Performance Show: Week 8"	May 6, 2013	13.12	2.0/5	8.4/13	
16	"Results Show: Week 8"	May 7, 2013	10.79	1.7/4	7.0/11	
17	"Performance Show: Week 9"	May 13, 2013	13.33	2.0/6	8.6/14	
18	"Results Show: Week 9"	May 14, 2013	11.87	1.8/5	7.6/12	
19	"Performance Show: Week 10"	May 20, 2013	14.97	2.6/7	9.5/10	
20	"Season Finale"	May 21, 2013	15.20	2.7/7	9.7/11	
