= Sharna Burgess =

Australian ballroom dancer

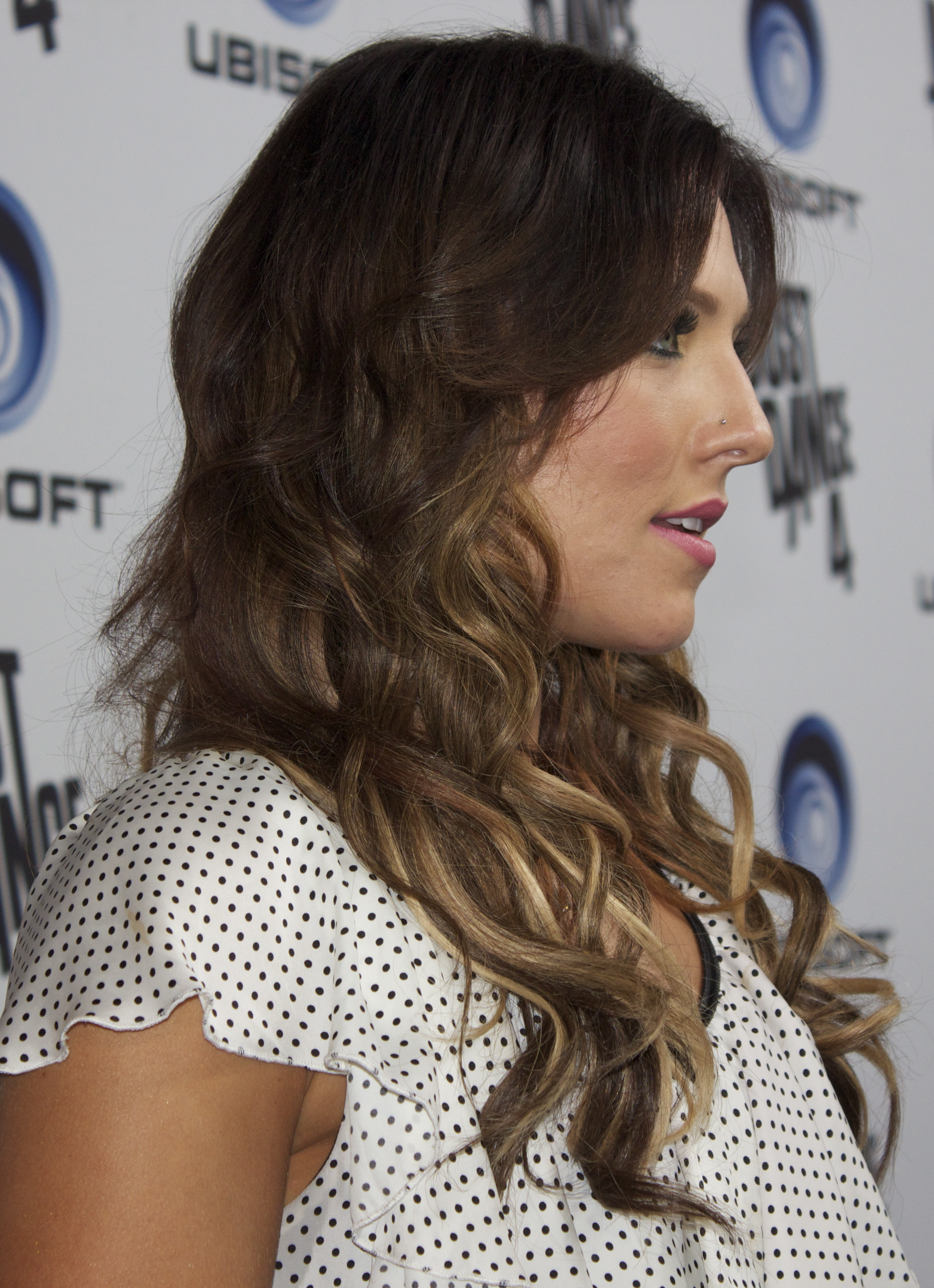
- Burgess in 2012
- Born: Sharna May Burgess; 21 June 1985 (age 41); Wagga Wagga, New South Wales, Australia
- Citizenship: Australia; United States
- Occupations: Dancer; choreographer
- Years active: 2000–present
- Partner(s): Brian Austin Green (2020–present; engaged)
- Children: 1

Sharna May Burgess (born 21 June 1985) is an Australian professional ballroom dancer and choreographer. She first gained recognition on the light entertainment television program Dancing with the Stars and the joint Belgian-Dutch iteration of So You Think You Can Dance.

Burgess relocated to the United States to join the American version of Dancing with the Stars as a member of the troupe. She was promoted to pro in 2013, and won the twenty-seventh season with on-air radio personality Bobby Bones. In 2019, Burgess returned to the Australian iteration of Dancing with the Stars as a judge alongside Craig Revel Horwood and Tristan MacManus.

== Early life ==
Sharna May Burgess was born on 21 June 1985 in Wagga Wagga, New South Wales, to Ray and Lucy Burgess. Growing up, she was involved in several sports and different styles of dance. At the age of five, she began training in ballet, jazz and gymnastics. When she turned eight, her study of ballroom began, and she went on to win many local and national titles. At age 15, she was chosen to represent Australia at the World Championships in both the Standard and Latin styles, and performed in the 2000 Summer Olympics Closing Ceremonies.

== Career ==
At age 18, Burgess moved to London, where she collected numerous titles and appeared in a UK tour with the show, Simply Ballroom. Post Simply Ballroom, choreographer Jason Gilkison gave her a spot on tour with Burn the Floor. She was in the cast for six years. Burgess was a member of the Burn the Floor cast when the show moved to Broadway.

Burgess' first television appearances were on the Australian Dancing with the Stars and So You Think You Can Dance in Belgium and the Netherlands. She joined the cast of season 13 of Dancing with the Stars as a troupe member. While on the troupe, she also assisted So You Think You Can Dance choreographer Jason Gilkison on both the Australian and American versions of the show. She remained on the troupe until the end of season 15. For season 16, Burgess was bumped to regular pro and was partnered with Andy Dick. She returned as a professional for season 17, this time partnered with retired NFL star Keyshawn Johnson. They were the first couple eliminated. For season 18, she was paired with Olympic ice dancer Charlie White. They were eliminated during week 9 (the semi-finals) and ended in 5th place despite raves from the judges and high scores throughout the season. Sharna was then confirmed for season 19 on 27 August. For season 19, she paired with talk-show host Tavis Smiley. They were eliminated on week 2, finishing in 12th place.

For season 20, Burgess was paired with combat veteran and motivational speaker, Noah Galloway. The pair made it to the finals and finished in third place. For season 21, she was paired with Backstreet Boys singer Nick Carter. The couple made it to the finals and ended in second place behind winners Bindi Irwin, and her partner Derek Hough. For season 22, she was paired with NFL player Antonio Brown. The couple made it to the semi-finals but were eliminated and finished in 4th place. For season 23, Burgess was partnered with race car driver James Hinchcliffe. Due to a knee injury from the previous week's dress rehearsal, Burgess had to sit out during week 8–9. Jenna Johnson substituted for her as Hinchcliffe's partner. The couple made it to the finals, and finished in 2nd place behind winners Laurie Hernandez and her partner Valentin Chmerkovskiy.

For season 24, Burgess was partnered with professional bull rider Bonner Bolton. The couple were eliminated on week 8, and finished in fifth place. Burgess returned for season 25 and was paired with former NBA player, Derek Fisher. The couple were eliminated on week 4, and finished in eleventh place. For season 26, she was paired with NFL player Josh Norman. The pair made it to the finals, finishing in second place overall. For season 27, she was partnered with radio personality Bobby Bones. Despite low scores from the judges, they were consistently saved by the viewers' votes and won the competition. On 2 February 2019, it was announced that Burgess was joining the Australian version of the reality dancing competition series as its sole female judge. Burgess did not appear on season 28 of the American version. She returned the following year for season 29 of the American version and was partnered with actor Jesse Metcalfe. The couple was eliminated in the fifth week of competition and finished in 12th place. In Season 30, she returned with real life partner Brian Austin Green and finished 13th.

| Season | Partner | Place |
|---|---|---|
| 16 | Andy Dick | 7th |
| 17 | Keyshawn Johnson | 12th |
| 18 | Charlie White | 5th |
| 19 | Tavis Smiley | 12th |
| 20 | Noah Galloway | 3rd |
| 21 | Nick Carter | 2nd |
| 22 | Antonio Brown | 4th |
| 23 | James Hinchcliffe | 2nd |
| 24 | Bonner Bolton | 5th |
| 25 | Derek Fisher | 11th |
| 26 | Josh Norman | 2nd |
| 27 | Bobby Bones | 1st |
| 29 | Jesse Metcalfe | 12th |
| 30 | Brian Austin Green | 13th |
| 35 | Tyler Cameron | 9th |

=== Performances on Dancing with the Stars ===
==== Season 16: Celebrity partner Andy Dick ====
- Average: 19.3
- Placed: 7th

In an interview with Access Hollywood, Burgess admitted she knew nothing of Dick's tumultuous past, due to the fact that she was living out of the country. Andy and Sharna continually received low scores and harsh criticisms from the judges. However, Burgess was praised for her work with him.

| Week # | Dance/song | Judges' score | | | Result |
|---|---|---|---|---|---|
| Week # | Dance/song | Inaba | Goodman | Tonioli | Result |
| 1 | Foxtrot / "Witchcraft" | 6 | 5 | 6 | No Elimination |
| 2 | Jazz / "Poker Face" | 7 | 6 | 7 | Safe |
| 3 | Cha-cha-cha / "Da Ya Think I'm Sexy?" | 6 | 6 | 6 | Bottom Two |
| 4 | Viennese Waltz / "Hallelujah" | 7 | 7 | 7 | Safe |
| 5 | Paso Doble / "The Plaza of Execution" | 6 | 6 | 6 | Safe |
| 6 | Samba / "Signed, Sealed, Delivered I'm Yours"; Team Samba/ "Superstition" | 6; 8 | 6; 9 | 6; 8 | Safe |
| 7 | Rumba / "Cherry Pink (and Apple Blossom White)"; Cha-cha-cha Dance off / "Brokenhearted" | 5 Lost | 6 This | 6 Event | Eliminated |

==== Season 17: Celebrity partner Keyshawn Johnson ====
- Average: 17.5
- Placed: 12th

| Week # | Dance/song | Judges' score | | | Result |
|---|---|---|---|---|---|
| Week # | Dance/song | Inaba | Goodman | Tonioli | Result |
| 1 | Cha-cha-cha / "Treasure" | 6 | 5 | 6 | No Elimination |
| 2 | Samba/Get Up Offa That Thing | 6 | 6 | 6 | Eliminated |

==== Season 18: Celebrity partner Charlie White ====
- Average: 27.0
- Placed: 5th

| Week # | Dance/song | Judges' score | | | | Result |
|---|---|---|---|---|---|---|
| Week # | Dance/song | Inaba | Goodman | Tonioli | Guest Judge | Result |
| 1 | Contemporary / "Let Her Go" | 9 | 9 | 9 | - | No Elimination |
| 2 | Tango / "Addicted to You" | 9 | 7 | 9 | - | Safe |
| 3 | Jive / "Happy" | 9 | 9 | 9 | 9^{1} | Safe |
| 4^{2} | Rumba / "Wildest Moments" | 7 | 8 | 9 | 9^{3} | No Elimination |
| 5 | Jazz / "Supercalifragilisticexpialidocious" | 9 | 10 | 9 | 9^{4} | Safe |
| 6 | Cha-cha-cha / "Gonna Make You Sweat (Everybody Dance Now)" | 9 | 9 | 9 | 9^{5} | Safe |
| 7 | Paso Doble / "Sail"; Team Freestyle / "The Cup of Life" | 9; 8 | 8; 8 | 9; 9 | 10^{6} 10 | Safe |
| 8 | Quickstep / "My Heart Goes Boom"; Celebrity Dance Duel (Contemporary) / "Stay with Me" | 10; 9 | 10; 9 | 10; 10 | 10^{7} 10 | Safe |
| 9 Semi-Finals | Foxtrot / "New York, New York"; Samba / "Mo Money Mo Problems" | 10; 9 | 10; 9 | 10; 9 | 10^{8} 9 | Eliminated |
^{1}Score from guest judge Robin Roberts^{2}For this week only, as part of the "Partner Switch-Up", White did not perform with Sharna Burgess and instead performed with Peta Murgatroyd.^{3}Score from guest judge Julianne Hough.^{4}Score from guest judge Donny Osmond.^{5}Score from guest judge Redfoo.^{6}Scores from guest judge Ricky Martin.^{7}Score from guest judge Abby Lee Miller.^{8}Score from guest judge Kenny Ortega.

==== Season 19: Celebrity partner Tavis Smiley ====
- Average: 28.5
- Placed: 12th

| Week # | Dance/song | Judges' score | | | | Result |
|---|---|---|---|---|---|---|
| Week # | Dance/song | Inaba | Goodman | Hough | Tonioli | Result |
| 1 | Foxtrot / "Pride and Joy" | 7 | 7 | 8 | 7 | Safe |
| 2 | Cha-cha-cha / "Boogie Wonderland" | 7 | 7 | 7 | 7 | Eliminated |

==== Season 20: Celebrity partner Noah Galloway ====
- Average: 32.9
- Placed: 3rd

| Week # | Dance/song | Judges' score | | | | Result |
|---|---|---|---|---|---|---|
| Week # | Dance/song | Inaba | Goodman | Hough | Tonioli | Result |
| 1 | Cha-cha-cha / "I Lived" | 7 | 6 | 6 | 7 | No Elimination |
| 2 | Samba / "Homegrown Honey" | 7 | 6 | 7 | 7 | Safe |
| 3 | Argentine Tango / "Rather Be" | 7 | 7 | 8 | 8 | Safe |
| 4 | Contemporary / "American Soldier" | 8 | 8 | 8 | 8 | Safe |
| 5 | Foxtrot / "A Whole New World" | 7 | 7 | 7 | 7 | Safe |
| 6 | Rumba / "Waves"; Team Freestyle / "Wipe Out" | 7; 10 | 7; 9 | 7; 10 | 8; 10 | Safe |
| 7 | Jazz / "Super Bad"; Cha-cha-cha Dance-Off / "Dance with Me" | 10; Awarded | 8; 2 | 9 Extra | 9 Points | Safe |
| 8 | Tango / "Geronimo"; Trio Salsa / "Mr. Put It Down" | 8; 8 | 7; 8 | 8; 8 | 8; 8 | Last to be called safe |
| 9 Semi-Finals | Viennese Waltz / "The Time of My Life"; Paso Doble / "Unstoppable" | 9 - | 9; 10 | 9; 10 | 9; 10 | Safe |
| 10; Finals | Argentine Tango / "Rather Be"; Freestyle / "Titanium" & "Fix You"; Argentine Tango & Cha-cha-cha Fusion / "Surrender" | 8; 10; 9 | 8; 10; 9 | 8; 10; 9 | 8; 10; 9 | Third Place |

==== Season 21: Celebrity partner Nick Carter ====
- Average: 27.2
- Placed: 2nd

| Week # | Dance/song | Judges' score | | | Result |
|---|---|---|---|---|---|
| Week # | Dance/song | Inaba | Hough | Tonioli | Result |
| 1 | Cha-cha-cha / "I Don't Like It, I Love It" | 8 | 8 | 8 | No Elimination |
| 2 | Jive / "Boogie Woogie Bugle Boy"; Foxtrot / "Coming Home" | 7; 8 | 7; 8 | 7; 8 | Safe |
| 3 | Viennese Waltz / "Did I Make the Most of Loving You?" | 9 | 9^{1}/9 | 9 | Safe |
| 4 | Jazz / "Everybody (Backstreet's Back)" | 9 | 9 | 9 | Safe |
| 5^{2} | Paso Doble / "Don't Look Down" | 9 | 9/8^{3} | 9 | No Elimination |
| 6 | Samba / "You Should Be Dancing" | 9 | 10/10^{4} | 10 | Safe |
| 7 | Argentine Tango / "Bring Me to Life"; Team Freestyle / "This Is Halloween" | 8; 10 | 8; 10 | 8; 10 | Safe |
| 8 | Contemporary / "Can't Help Falling in Love" | 10 | 10 | 10 | Safe (Immunity) |
| 9 | Quickstep / "A Cool Cat in Town"; Team-Up Dance (Rumba) / "Hey Jude" | 9; 9 | 9; 9 | 10; 9 | Safe |
| 10; Semifinals | Tango / "Scars"; Samba Dance-off / "Lean On"; Trio Salsa / "No Doubt About It" | 8 No; 10 | 8 Extra; 10 | 8 Points; 10 | Last to be called safe |
| 11; Finals | Jive / "Runaway Baby"; Freestyle / "Larger than Life"; Salsa & Tango Fusion / "Turn Up the Music" | 10; 10; 10 | 10; 10; 10 | 10; 10; 10 | Runner-Up |
^{1} Score given by guest judge Alfonso Ribeiro.^{2}This week only, for "Partner Switch-Up" week, Carter performed with Witney Carson instead of Burgess. Burgess performed with Andy Grammer.^{3}Score given by guest judge Maksim Chmerkovskiy^{4}Score given by guest judge Olivia Newton-John.

==== Season 22: Celebrity partner Antonio Brown ====
- Average: 24.7
- Placed: 4th

| Week # | Dance/song | Judges' score | | | Result |
|---|---|---|---|---|---|
| Week # | Dance/song | Inaba | Goodman | Tonioli | Result |
| 1 | Quickstep / "Bad Man" | 8 | 6 | 7 | No Elimination |
| 2 | Rumba / "Adorn" | 6 | 6 | 7 | Safe |
| 3 | Foxtrot / "7 Years" | 7 | 6 | 7 | Safe |
| 4 | Jazz / "Friend Like Me" | 9 | 8/9^{1} | 9 | Safe |
| 5 | Cha-cha-cha / "Son of a Preacher Man" | 7 | 6/6^{2} | 7 | No Elimination |
| 6 | Jive / "Footloose" | 9 | 9 | 9 | Safe |
| 7 | Tango / "Paint It Black"; Team Freestyle / "Super Bad", "Living in America" & "I Got You (I Feel Good)" | 8; 9 | 8; 9 | 8; 10 | Safe |
| 8 | Viennese Waltz / "Love On the Brain"; Team-up Dance (Paso Doble) / "Everybody Wants to Rule the World" | 9; 9^{3} | 9; 10 | 9; 10 | Safe |
| 9 Semifinals | Trio Argentine Tango / "Mi Confesion"; Contemporary / "Hall of Fame" | 9; 9 | 9; 9 | 9; 10 | Eliminated |
^{1} Score given by guest judge Zendaya.^{2} For this week only, as part of "America's Switch Up", Brown performed with Karina Smirnoff instead of Burgess. Burgess performed with Nyle DiMarco.^{3} Score given by guest judge Maksim Chmerkovskiy.^{3} Due to Inaba being the judge coaching Brown's team during the team-up dance, the viewers scored the dance in her place with the averaged score being counted alongside the remaining judges.

==== Season 23: Celebrity partner James Hinchcliffe ====
- Average: 36.6
- Placed: 2nd

| Week # | Dance/song | Judges' score | | | | Result |
|---|---|---|---|---|---|---|
| Week # | Dance/song | Inaba | Goodman | Hough | Tonioli | Result |
| 1 | Foxtrot / "Live Life" | 8 | 8 | 7 | 8 | No Elimination |
| 2 | Paso Doble / "The Walking Dead Theme" | 7 | 7 | 7 | 8 | Safe |
| 3 | Cha-cha-cha / "Big Trouble" | 7 | 7 | 8 | 7 | Safe (Immunity) |
| 4 | Quickstep / "The Hollywood Wiz" | 9 | N/A | 9 | 10 | Safe |
| 5 | Tango / "The Right Time" | 10 | N/A | 9 | 10 | No Elimination |
| 6 | Rumba / "Need the Sun to Break" | 10 | 9^{1} | 9 | 10 | Safe |
| 7 | Jitterbug / "In the Mood"; Team Freestyle / "The Skye Boat Song" | 9; 10 | 9; 9 | 9; 9 | 9; 10 | Safe |
| 8^{2} | Viennese Waltz / "You Don't Own Me" | 10 | N/A | 10 | 10 | Safe (Immunity) |
| 9^{2} | Jazz / "A Brand New Day"; Team-Up Dance (Paso Doble) / "No Good" | 9; 9 | 9^{3} 9^{3} | 9; 10 | 9; 9 | Safe |
| 10; Semifinals | Argentine Tango / "Santa Maria"; Trio Jive / "Gimme Some Lovin'" | 9; 10 | N/A; N/A | 10; 10 | 10; 10 | Safe |
| 11; Finals | Foxtrot / "It Had to Be You"; Freestyle / "Beethoven's 5 Secrets"; Viennese Waltz & Foxtrot Fusion / "Over and Over Again" | 9; 10; 10 | 9; 10; 10 | 9; 10; 10 | 10; 10; 10 | Runner-Up |
^{1} Score given by guest judge Pitbull.^{2}Due to a knee injury, Burgess was unable to perform with Hinchcliffe, but did choreograph the dances. Hinchcliffe instead danced with Jenna Johnson.^{3}Score given by guest judge Idina Menzel

==== Season 24: Celebrity partner Bonner Bolton ====
- Average: 28.9
- Placed: 5th

| Week # | Dance/song | Judges' score | | | | Result |
|---|---|---|---|---|---|---|
| Week # | Dance/song | Inaba | Goodman | Hough | Tonioli | Result |
| 1 | Cha-cha-cha / "Move" | 6 | 5 | 5 | 6 | No Elimination |
| 2 | Viennese Waltz / "Unlove You" | 8 | 6 | 8 | 7 | Safe |
| 3 | Charleston / "A Little Party Never Killed Nobody (All We Got)" | 6 | 6 | 6 | 6 | Safe |
| 4 | Foxtrot / "Feeling Good" | 8 | 8 | 8 | 8 | Safe |
| 5 | Tango / "When Can I See You Again?" | 7 | 8 | 8 | 7 | Safe |
| 6 | Rumba / "I Want It That Way"; Team Freestyle / "Dancing Machine", "You Got It (The Right Stuff)" & "Best Song Ever" | 8; 8 | 7; 8 | 8^{1} 9^{1} | 7; 8 | Safe |
| 7 | Paso Doble / "Rodeo: Four Episodes"; Rumba Dance-Off / "I Will Always Love You" | 7 Awarded | 7; 2 | 8^{2} Extra | 7 Points | Safe |
| 8 | Argentine Tango / "Believer"; Trio Jazz / "That's What I Like" | 8; 7 | 7; 7 | 8; 7 | 7; 7 | Eliminated |
^{1} Score given by guest judge Nick Carter.^{2} Score given by guest judge Mandy Moore.

==== Season 25: Celebrity partner Derek Fisher ====
- Average: 20.0
- Placed: 11th

| Week # | Dance/song | Judges' score | | | Result |
|---|---|---|---|---|---|
| Week # | Dance/song | Inaba | Goodman | Tonioli | Result |
| 1 | Salsa / "Basketball" | 6 | 6 | 6 | No Elimination |
| 2 | Foxtrot / "Hallelujah I Love Her So"; Paso Doble / "Diablo Rojo" | 6; 7 | 6; 6 | 7; 6 | Safe |
| 3 | Cha-cha-cha / "The Fresh Prince of Bel-Air" | 7 | 7 | 7 | No Elimination |
| 4 | Jazz / "Move On Up" | 7 | 8 | 8 | Eliminated |

==== Season 26: Celebrity partner Josh Norman ====
- Average: 25.8
- Placed: 2nd

| Week # | Dance/song | Judges' score | | | Result |
|---|---|---|---|---|---|
| Week # | Dance/song | Inaba | Goodman | Tonioli | Result |
| 1 | Cha-cha-cha / "Finesse" | 8 | 8 | 8 | Safe |
| 2 | Paso Doble / "The Plaza of Execution"; Team Freestyle / "...Baby One More Time" | 7; 8 | 8/7^{1} 8/9^{1} | 8; 8 | Safe |
| 3 | Contemporary / "Stand by Me"; Salsa Dance-Off / "WTF (Where They From)" | 9 Awarded | 9/9^{2} 2 | 9 Points | Last to be called safe |
| 4 Finals | Foxtrot / "Conqueror"; Freestyle / "Walk on Water" | 9; 10 | 9; 10 | 9; 10 | Runner-up |
^{1} Score given by guest judge Rashad Jennings.^{2} Score given by guest judge David Ross.

==== Season 27: Celebrity partner Bobby Bones ====
- Average: 22.8
- Placed: 1st

| Week # | Dance/song | Judges' score | | | Result |
|---|---|---|---|---|---|
| Week # | Dance/song | Inaba | Goodman | Tonioli | Result |
| 1 | Jive / "T-R-O-U-B-L-E" | 7 | 6 | 7 | Safe |
| 2 | Foxtrot / "Theme from New York, New York"; Quickstep / "That Old Black Magic" | 7; 7 | 6; 6 | 7; 6 | Safe |
| 3 | Contemporary / "A Million Dreams" | 8 | 7 | 8 | Safe |
| 4 | Trio Cha-cha-cha / "U Can't Touch This" | 7 | 6 | 7 | Safe |
| 5 | Waltz / "Part of Your World" | 7 | 7 | 7 | No Elimination |
| 6 | Argentine Tango / "Mr. Sandman" | 8 | 7 | 7 | Safe |
| 7 | Viennese Waltz / "Can't Help Falling in Love"; Team Freestyle / "9 to 5" | 8; 10 | 8; 9 | 8; 10 | Safe |
| 8 Semifinals | Salsa / "G.D.F.R."; Jive / "Gimme Some Lovin'" | 7; 8 | 7; 8 | 7; 8 | Safe |
| 9 Finals | Cha-cha-cha / "U Can't Touch This"; Freestyle / "The Greatest Show" | 8; 10 | 8; 10 | 8; 10 | Winner |

==== Season 29: Celebrity partner Jesse Metcalfe ====
- Average: 19.6
- Placed: 12th

| Week # | Dance/song | Judges' score | | | Result |
| Week # | Dance/song | Carrie Ann | Derek | Bruno | Result |
| 1 | Quickstep / "Part-Time Lover" | 6 | 6 | 6 | No Elimination |
| 2 | Foxtrot / "Dreams" | 7 | 7 | 6 | Safe |
| 3 | Jive / "King of New York" | 7 | 6 | 7 | Safe |
| 4 | Cha-cha-cha / "Smooth" | 7 | 7 | 7 | Safe |
| 5 | Tango / "Everybody Wants to Rule the World" | 7 | 6 | 6 | Eliminated |

==== Season 30: Celebrity partner Brian Austin Green ====
- Average: 24.8
- Placed: 13th

| Week # | Dance/song | Judges' score | | | Result | |
|---|---|---|---|---|---|---|
| Week # | Dance/song | Inaba | Goodman | Hough | Result | Tonioli |
| 1 | Foxtrot / "Skate" | 6 | 6 | 6 | 6 | No Elimination |
| 2 | Rumba / "Say You Won't Let Go" | 6 | 5 | 6 | 6 | Safe |
| 3 | Tango / "Till The World Ends" | 7 | 6 | N/A | 6 | Safe |
| 4 | Waltz / "Someday My Prince Will Come" | 6 | 6 | 7 | 6 | Eliminated |

== Personal life ==
After her performance in the World Championships semi-finals, Burgess discovered she had a small tear in her knee ligament. Rather than take immediate action, she insisted on finishing the competition.

She dated choreographer and dancer Paul Kirkland from 2010 to 2015.

On September 22, 2023, Burgess announced via Instagram that she and actor Brian Austin Green were engaged. They met in 2020 after being set up by mutual friends. In February 2022, they announced they were expecting their first child together. Their son was born on June 28, 2022.

On 6 October 2022, Burgess announced that she had become a United States citizen.

== Filmography ==
=== As herself ===
Television
| Year | Title | Role | Notes |
|---|---|---|---|
| 2011–2021, 2026 | Dancing with the Stars | Dancer / Choreographer | American version of Dancing with the Stars; 160 episodes |
| 2017 | Celebrity Family Feud | Contestant | Episode: "Dancing with the Stars vs. Shark Tank and Cynthia Bailey vs. Kandi Burruss-Tucker" |
| 2018 | Country Music Association Awards | Presenter | Television special |
| 2019 | Strictly Come Dancing: It Takes Two | Choreographer | Episode: "Episode #16.59" |
| 2019–2025 | Dancing with the Stars | Judge | Australian version of Dancing with the Stars; 38 episodes |
