= E. Gluck Corporation =

American watch manufacturer

- Company type: Private
- Industry: Watch manufacturing
- Founded: 1956
- Founder: Eugen Gluck
- Fate: Chapter 11 bankruptcy
- Headquarters: Little Neck, NY, New York City, New York, U.S.
- Area served: U.S.
- Owner: Eugen Gluck
- Divisions: Armitron, Torgoen
- Website: E. Gluck Corporation

E. Gluck Corporation is an American watch manufacturer headquartered in Little Neck, New York. It was founded in 1956 by Eugen Gluck. E. Gluck Corporation manufactures watches under two flagship proprietary brands, Armitron and Torgoen. The company also manufactures watches for major fashion brands, including: Anne Klein, Nine West, Juicy Couture, Vince Camuto, Badgley Mischka and Joseph Abboud. As of 1999, Armitron had the fifth largest share of all watch purchases, by brand, in the United States. As of 2005, Armitron ranks as one of the top ten fine and fashion watch brands in the US, along with Timex, Fossil, Seiko, Citizen, Casio, Guess, Bulova, Movado, and Pulsar.

In December 2025, E. Gluck Corporation filed for Chapter 11 bankruptcy protection after a failed attempt at getting into the smartwatch industry.

== Divisions ==
=== Armitron ===
- Men's Dress Watches
- Men's Sport Watches
- Ladies' Dress Watches
  - Themed-dials
- Ladies' Sport Watches

Armitron is a medium-price watch manufacturing company which manufactures and retails watches in the U.S. only.

=== Brands ===
- Anne Klein
- Anne Klein NY
- Armitron
- Badgley Mischka
- JLO By Jennifer Lopez
- Nine West

== Major categories ==
=== Digital watches ===
Armitron started making digital watches in the 1970s with LED displays. The LED displays consumed so much battery life that, in 1977, the company stopped production. Armitron subsequently began manufacturing their digital watches with LCD displays, which eventually became the industry standard.

=== Automatic movements ===
In 2007, Armitron began manufacturing automatic watches.

== Notable marketing efforts ==
- Clock sponsor at Yankee Stadium.
