= Mr. Put It Down =

Single by Ricky Martin featuring Pitbull
- B-side: "Adiós"; "Come with Me"
- Released: March 11, 2015
- Recorded: 2014
- Genre: Dance-pop
- Length: 3:16
- Label: Sony Music Latin
- Songwriters: Ricky Martin; Aaron Pearce; Jeremy Hunter; Keith Ross; Gavriel Avinov; Armando Pérez

Ricky Martin singles chronology
"Disparo al Corazón" (2015)	"Mr. Put It Down" (2015)	"La Mordidita" (2015)

Pitbull singles chronology
"Piensas (Dila la Verdad)" (2014)	"Mr. Put It Down" (2015)	"Fun" (2015)

"Mr. Put It Down" is a song recorded by Puerto Rican singer Ricky Martin. It was written by Martin, Aaron Pearce, Jeremy Hunter, Keith Ross, Gavriel Avinov and Pitbull, who is also featured with a rap verse. "Mr Put It Down" is a dance-pop song with a club and disco influence and elements from the 1970s and 1980s musical styles. Critics compared the song to the works by several music artists such as Michael Jackson, Earth, Wind & Fire and Justin Timberlake. To deliver the lyrics, Martin uses processed vocals and his falsetto. Following its release it charted on the Wallonia Ultratip chart at number 19 and Ultratop Wallonia Dance chart at number 31. In Billboard's July 4, 2015, issue, it reached number one on the Dance Club Songs chart. "Mr. Put It Down" served as the opener on Martin's 2015 One World Tour.

== Release and composition ==
"Mr. Put It Down" was written by Ricky Martin, Aaron Pearce, Jeremy Hunter, Keith Ross, Gavriel Avinov and Armando Pérez. It was digitally released on March 11, 2015, via the iTunes Store. In the United Kingdom, it was released on May 24, 2015.

"Mr. Put It Down"
A 16-second sample of the chorus of "Mr. Put It Down", a "raunchy club-banger" and "disco-flavored jam" on which Martin uses processed vocals and his falsetto to deliver the lyrical content.

"Mr. Put It Down" is a "funky" pop song with a length of three minutes and sixteen seconds. According to Mike Wass of Idolator, the song is a "raunchy club-banger" and "disco-flavored jam" that lasts for three minutes and sixteen seconds. Andrew Le of Renowned for Sound described the single as "unashamedly party song" that channels the music "glory days" of the late 1970s and early 1980s. Le wrote that "Mr. Put It Down" features slick, thick and funky arrangements which according to him are inspired by the works of the band Earth Wind & Fire and singers Prince and Michael Jackson. He also noted that the song contains groovy synthesizers and guitar licks with which help reminiscents of "Working Day and Night" (performed by Jackson, 1979) and "Let's Groove" (performed by Earth Wind & Fire, 1981).

Wass described "Mr. Put It Down" as a musical combination of the 2013 single "Take Back the Night" by American singer Justin Timberlake and the 2014 song by Austin Mahone, "Mmm Yeah" on which Pitbull is featured as well. It begins with a rap verse by Pitbull who brags about his relationship with women. The chorus of the song, features Martin singing the lyrics, "“Who has a lifetime, baby? We've got the night right now. When you see what I’m planning, you're gonna call me Mr. Put It Down.". Martin's vocals in the song are processed and he uses his falsetto to deliver the lyrics. Between Martin's parts, Pitbull talks the lines "Pitbull such a dawg" and "give me that uh!". Le also found "remarkable" that the rapper managed to rhyme, "lust can get tricky" with "Ricky".

== Reception ==
=== Critical ===
Andrew Le of Renowned for Sound gave the song two out of five stars and wrote that Martin and Pitbull are a "mismatch" on "Mr. Put It Down". According to him Martin has a much better party songs such as the 1998 single "The Cup of Life". He wrote that the single "is a warning for listeners not to put down their drinks and get on the dance floor, but for Pitbull and Martin to put down any plans of sequels."

=== Commercial ===
With "Mr. Put It Down", Martin earned his first number one hit on the US Dance Club Songs chart, in June 2015. It became his seventh top 10 and ninth song to chart overall on Billboard's Dance Club Songs.

Following its release, "Mr. Put It Down" also reached number 91 on the Australian Singles Charts and charted in Belgium Wallonia, peaking at number 19 on Ultratip and number 28 on the Ultratop Dance chart.

== Live performances ==
Martin performed the song on the American Idol final on May 12, 2015. He then performed it on Britain's Got Talent on May 25, 2015. Martin used "Mr. Put It Down" as an opener on his 2015 One World Tour set list.

== Formats and track listing ==
- Digital single
1. "Mr. Put It Down" – 3:15
- Digital EP
1. "Mr. Put It Down" (Big Syphe Remix) – 4:30
2. "Mr. Put It Down" (DJ Drew & Mayeda Remix) – 5:05
3. "Mr. Put It Down" (DJ White Shadow Remix) – 4:06
4. "Mr. Put It Down" (Lexo Trap Remix) – 4:05
5. "Mr. Put It Down" (Jump Smokers Remix Extended Version) – 4:28
6. "Mr. Put It Down" (Jump Smokers Remix Radio Edit) – 4:03
- Digital single
1. "Mr. Put It Down" (Noodles Remix) – 4:11
- Digital single
1. "Mr. Put It Down" (Noodles Remix Dub Mix) – 4:04
- Australian CD single
1. "Mr. Put It Down" – 3:15
2. "Adiós" – 3:58
3. "Come with Me" – 3:37
4. "Adiós" (Danny Verde Remix) – 6:47
5. "Adiós" (DJ Riddler Remix [English Version]) – 5:18
- UK Promo Remixes
1. "Mr. Put It Down" (JRMX Edit & Club Remixes)

== Charts ==
=== Weekly charts ===
Chart (2015)	Peak position
Australia (ARIA)	91
Belgium (Ultratip Bubbling Under Wallonia)	19
Belgium Dance (Ultratop Wallonia)	28
US Dance Club Songs (Billboard)	1

=== Year-end charts ===
Chart (2015)	Position
US Dance Club Songs (Billboard)	33

== Release history ==
Country	Date	Format	Label	Ref.
Australia	March 11, 2015	Digital download	Sony Music Latin	
Canada	March 11, 2015	Digital download	Sony Music Latin	
France	March 11, 2015	Digital download	Sony Music Latin	
Germany	March 11, 2015	Digital download	Sony Music Latin	
Italy	March 11, 2015	Digital download	Sony Music Latin	
New Zealand	March 11, 2015	Digital download	Sony Music Latin	
Spain	March 11, 2015	Digital download	Sony Music Latin	
United States	March 11, 2015	Digital download	Sony Music Latin	
Australia	April 28, 2015	Remixes EP	Sony Music Latin	
Canada	April 28, 2015	Remixes EP	Sony Music Latin	
France	April 28, 2015	Remixes EP	Sony Music Latin	
Germany	April 28, 2015	Remixes EP	Sony Music Latin	
Italy	April 28, 2015	Remixes EP	Sony Music Latin	
New Zealand	April 28, 2015	Remixes EP	Sony Music Latin	
Spain	April 28, 2015	Remixes EP	Sony Music Latin	
United States	April 28, 2015	Remixes EP	Sony Music Latin	
United Kingdom	May 24, 2015	Digital download	Sony Music Latin	

== See also ==
- List of number-one dance singles of 2015 (U.S.)
