= The Incredibles (soundtrack) =

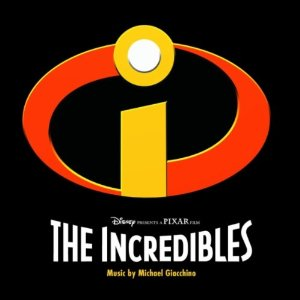

Film score by Michael Giacchino
- Released: November 2, 2004
- Recorded: 2003–2004
- Studios: Sony Pictures Studios; Signet Sound Studios (Los Angeles)
- Genres: Soundtrack; jazz
- Length: 55:12
- Label: Walt Disney
- Producer: Michael Giacchino

Michael Giacchino chronology
| Sin (2003) | The Incredibles (2004) | Sky High (2005) |

Professional ratings
Review scores
| Source | Rating |
|---|---|
| Allmusic | 4/5 stars |
| Empire | 4/5 stars |
| Filmtracks | 4/5 stars |
| Movie Music UK | 4/5 stars |
| Movie Wave | 4/5 stars |
| Soundtrack.net | 4/5 stars |

The Incredibles is the soundtrack album to the 2004 Disney-Pixar film of the same name composed and arranged by Michael Giacchino. The Incredibles is the first Pixar film to be scored by Giacchino. Director Brad Bird was looking for a specific sound as inspired by the film's design — the future as seen from the 1960s. John Barry was the first choice to do the film's score with a trailer of the film given a rerecording of Barry's theme to On Her Majesty's Secret Service. However, Barry did not wish to duplicate the sound of some of his earlier soundtracks; the assignment was instead given to Giacchino.

The soundtrack was released on November 2, 2004 by Walt Disney Records, three days before the film opened in theaters. It won numerous awards for Best Score and was nominated for the Grammy Award for Best Score Soundtrack for Visual Media. Music used for the film's trailers but not available on the soundtrack album includes "On Her Majesty's Secret Service" from the Propellerheads album Decksandrumsandrockandroll as well as excerpts from the David Arnold project Shaken and Stirred: The David Arnold James Bond Project. The animated short Jack-Jack Attack, which accompanied the film's DVD release, also features the "Alla Turca" movement from Mozart's Piano Sonata No. 11, 4th movement of Eine kleine Nachtmusik and Dies irae from Requiem.

== Recording ==
Giacchino noted that recording in the 1960s was largely different than modern day recording and Dan Wallin, the recording engineer, said that Bird wanted an old feel and as such the score was recorded on analogue tapes. Wallin noted that brass instruments which are at the forefront of the score of The Incredibles, generally sound stronger on analog.

== Awards ==
The film's orchestral score was released on November 2, 2004, three days before the film opened in theaters. It won numerous awards for best score including Los Angeles Film Critics Association Award, BMI Film & TV Award, ASCAP Film and Television Music Award, Annie Award, Las Vegas Film Critics Society Award and Online Film Critics Society Award and was nominated for Grammy Award for Best Score Soundtrack for Visual Media, Satellite Award and Broadcast Film Critics Association Award.

== Track listing ==
All music is composed by Michael Giacchino.

| No. | Title | Length |
|---|---|---|
| 1. | "The Glory Days" | 3:32 |
| 2. | "Mr. Huph Will See You Now" | 1:35 |
| 3. | "Adventure Calling" | 2:27 |
| 4. | "Bob vs. the Omnidroid" | 2:53 |
| 5. | "Lava in the Afternoon" | 1:29 |
| 6. | "Life's Incredible Again" | 1:23 |
| 7. | "Off to Work" | 1:59 |
| 8. | "New and Improved" | 2:15 |
| 9. | "Kronos Unveiled" | 3:16 |
| 10. | "Marital Rescue" | 2:19 |
| 11. | "Missile Lock" | 2:07 |
| 12. | "Lithe or Death" | 3:24 |
| 13. | "100 Mile Dash" | 3:07 |
| 14. | "A Whole Family of Supers" | 3:27 |
| 15. | "Escaping Nomanisan" | 1:45 |
| 16. | "Road Trip!" | 2:27 |
| 17. | "Saving Metroville" | 5:03 |
| 18. | "The New Babysitter" | 3:26 |
| 19. | "The Incredits" | 7:21 |
| Total length: | | 55:15 |
