= Armitron =

Watch brand

- Type: Family business
- Industry: Watch manufacturing
- Founded: 1975; 51 years ago
- Headquarters: Little Neck, New York
- Key people: Eugen Gluck, Founder
- Owner: Barbara Weichselbaum
- Parent: E. Gluck Corporation
- Website: www.armitron.com

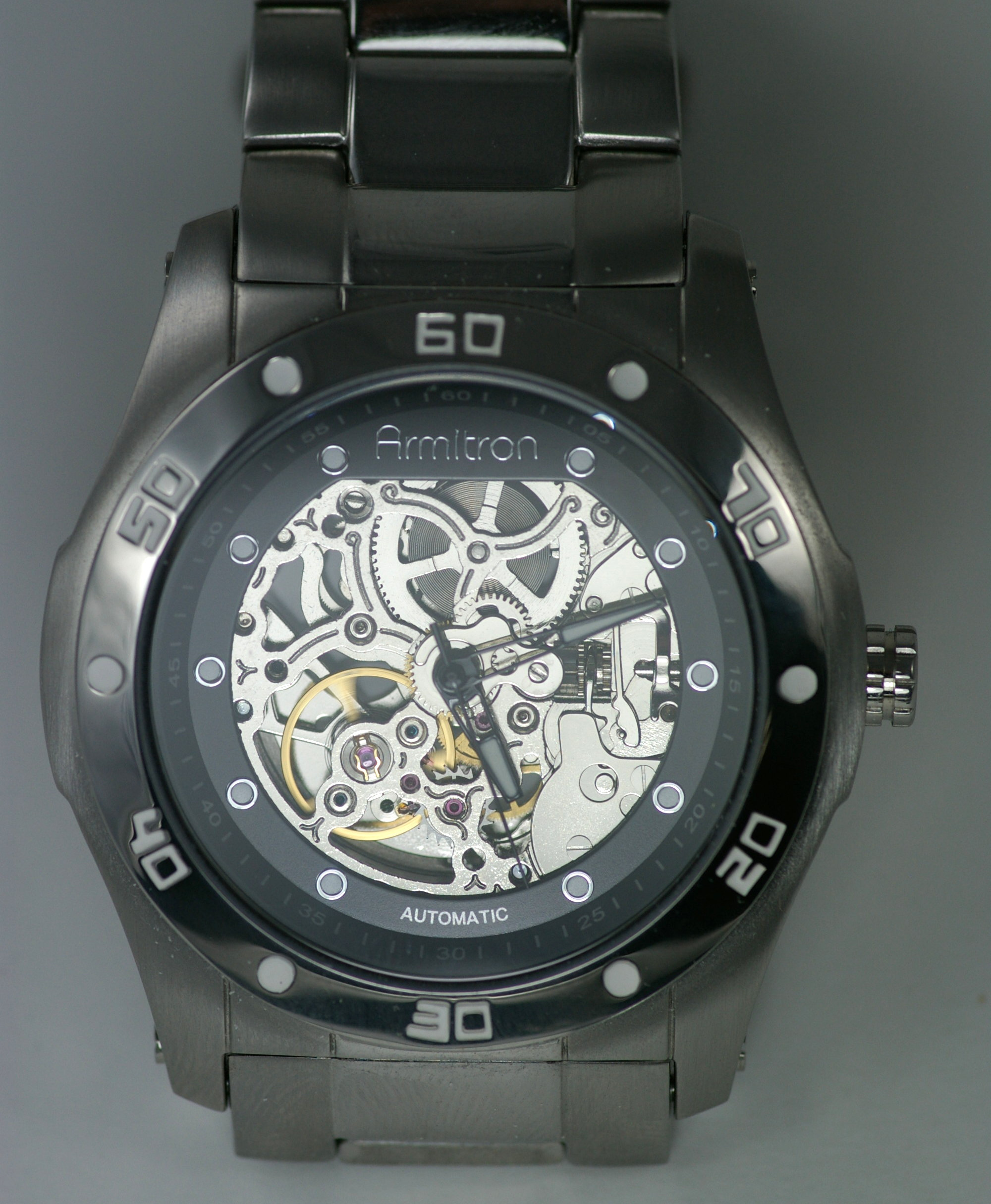
An automatic Armitron watch.

Armitron is an American watch brand and manufacturer headquartered in Little Neck, New York, United States. The brand was founded in 1975 by American immigrant Holocaust survivor, Eugen Gluck.

== History ==
At the time of Armitron's founding, E. Gluck Corporation (then E. Gluck Trading Company) was a subsidiary of Armin Corporation. It specialized in LED-powered, five-function (hour, minutes, second, day and date) digital watches. The Armitron brand name is a combination of “Armin” and “electronics”. Often using cases from Switzerland and bracelets from Hong Kong, Armitron originally used LED watch modules produced by Computed Time Corp. a subsidiary of Armin Corporation in Arlington, Texas. These watches were also sold under other Armin Corporation brands such as Quasar and Saturn Time Corp. Computed Time Corp. later was spun off into Texas Time, Inc which was briefly used by Armitron for LCD watch modules from 1978 to 1979 before switching primarily to foreign manufacturers.

In the late 1970s, E. Gluck Trading Company and Armin Corporation severed ties. E. Gluck Corporation became a privately held company and retained the Armitron brand. As watch technology evolved and LED technology became less practical, LCD (liquid crystal display) displays were integrated into Armitron watches. Combined with Japanese quartz movements, these LCD watches were extremely accurate and durable. Advanced functionality, such as alarms and chronographs were later incorporated to enhance the benefits of this precise timekeeper.

Through the 1980s, Armitron was widely identified by its connection with various professional sports teams and professional athletes. Jerry Rice, Boomer Esiason, Darryl Strawberry, Dwight Gooden, Larry Bird and others were endorsers of the brand. Armitron remains an Official Sponsor of the New York Yankees.

Today, Armitron continues to produce a range of quartz and automatic movement timepieces for men and women.

As of the 2021 season, Armitron is a clock sponsor at Yankee Stadium, and for the original run of American Gladiators.

In December 2025, E. Gluck Corporation filed for Chapter 11 bankruptcy protection after a failed attempt at getting into the smartwatch industry.
