= List of Hulu original programming =

Beginning in 2011, streaming service Hulu began to produce its own original content. The first production released was the web series The Morning After, a light-hearted pop-culture news show. In 2012, Hulu announced that it would begin airing its first original scripted program, titled Battleground.

On October 8, 2025, Hulu replaced Star on Disney+ in all territories outside of United States except Japan, becoming a global brand, with shows labeled 'Star Original' being rebranded as 'Hulu Original' shows. In Japan, the Hulu brand is owned by Nippon Television and is separate from Disney content.

== Original programming ==
=== Drama ===
Title	Genre	Premiere	Seasons	Length	Exclusive region(s)	Status
Reasonable Doubt	Legal drama	September 27, 2022	4 seasons, 39 episodes	46–55 min	All markets (Note: Labeled as a Star Original outside of the US prior to October 8, 2025.)	Season 4 ongoing Renewed
Shōgun (Note: Part of FX on Hulu in North America.)	Historical drama	February 27, 2024	1 season, 10 episodes	53–70 min	All markets	Renewed
Paradise	Political thriller	January 26, 2025	2 seasons, 16 episodes	44–59 min	All markets	Renewed for final season
Good American Family	True crime anthology	March 19, 2025	1 season, 8 episodes	47–62 min	All markets	Renewed
Alien: Earth (Note: Episodes premiere at the same time on FX.)	Science fiction horror	August 12, 2025	1 season, 8 episodes	54–63 min	All markets	Renewed
All's Fair	Legal drama	November 4, 2025	2 seasons, 17 episodes	41–57 min	All markets	Season 2 ongoing
Love Story	Period romance anthology	February 12, 2026	1 season, 9 episodes	42–58 min	All markets	Pending
The Testaments	Dystopian drama	April 8, 2026	1 season, 10 episodes	37–58 min	All markets	Renewed
Furious	Crime thriller	July 27, 2026	1 season, 8 episodes	45–55 min	All markets	Renewed
The Shards	Teen thriller	August 5, 2026	1 season, 9 episodes	24–54 min	All markets	Pending
The Drop: A Snowfall Saga	Crime drama	September 8, 2026	1 season, 8 episodes	42–57 min	All markets	Pending
Awaiting release
The Spot	Drama	January 13, 2027	1 season, 8 episodes	TBA	All markets	Pending
The Land	Sports drama	February 15, 2027	TBA	TBA	All markets	Pending

=== Comedy ===
Title	Genre	Premiere	Seasons	Length	Exclusive region(s)	Status
Only Murders in the Building	Mystery comedy drama	August 31, 2021	5 seasons, 50 episodes	28–40 min	All markets	Season 6 due to premiere on December 8, 2026
Chad Powers	Sports comedy	September 30, 2025	2 seasons, 12 episodes	28–42 min	All markets	Pending
Alice and Steve	Comedy	June 8, 2026	1 season, 6 episodes	26–31	All markets	Renewed
Phony	Coming-of-age mystery comedy	October 20, 2026	1 season, 8 episodes	26–36 min	All markets	Season 1 ongoing

=== Animation ===
Title	Genre	Premiere	Seasons	Length	Exclusive region(s)	Status
The Wonderfully Weird World of Gumball	Comedy	July 28, 2025	2 seasons, 40 episodes	11–13 min	United States	Renewed for seasons 3–4
Adventure Time: Side Quests	Adventure fantasy	June 29, 2026	2 seasons, 40 episodes	10–11 min	United States	Pending

=== Unscripted ===
==== Docuseries ====
Title	Subject	Premiere	Seasons	Length	Exclusive region(s)	Status
Betrayal	True crime	July 11, 2023	4 seasons, 12 episodes	41–45 min	Selected territories	Pending
Impact x Nightline	News magazine	October 6, 2023	5 seasons, 135 episodes (Note: Several "episodes" are listed as separate entries on Hulu, rather than as part of the series.)	24–49 min	United States	Season 5 ongoing
4x20: Quick Hits	Cannabis	April 20, 2026	1 season, 4 episodes	20–22 min	Selected territories	Pending
Squatters: Get the F*** Out of My House	True crime	June 4, 2026	1 season, 6 episodes	21 min	Selected territories	Pending
20/20 Britain's Most Notorious Crime Investigations	True crime	July 30, 2026	1 season, 6 episodes	42 min	Selected territories	Pending

==== Reality ====
Title	Genre	Premiere	Seasons	Length	Exclusive region(s)	Status
The Kardashians	Docu-soap	April 14, 2022	8 seasons, 80 episodes	39–60 min	All markets	Season 8 ongoing
Vanderpump Villa	Docu-soap	April 1, 2024	3 seasons, 33 episodes	41–61 min	Selected territories	Renewed
Dance Moms: A New Era	Docu-reality	August 7, 2024	2 seasons, 20 episodes	42–63 min	United States	Season 3 due to premiere December 3, 2026
The Secret Lives of Mormon Wives	Docu-soap	September 6, 2024	5 seasons, 45 episodes	39–99 min	All markets	Renewed for seasons 6–7
Raising Chelsea	Reality	April 2, 2026	1 season, 3 episodes	42–43 min	Selected territories	Renewed
Designed to Last	Design competition	May 5, 2026	1 season, 4 episodes	43–48 min	Selected territories	Pending
The Girls: A Khloé Kardashian Project	Docu-soap	August 21, 2026	1 season, 6 episodes	39–49 min	Selected territories	Pending
The Real Rooneys	Docu-reality	September 24, 2026	1 season, 10 episodes	26–43 min	Selected territories	Pending
The Mob	Reality competition	October 26, 2026	1 season, 6 episodes	40–44 min	Selected territories	Pending
The Secret Lives of Mormon Wives: Orange County	Reality	November 12, 2026	1 season 10 episodes	46–59 min	Selected territories	Pending

==== Variety ====
Title	Genre	Premiere	Seasons	Length	Exclusive region(s)	Status
Rabbit Hole	Variety show	July 13, 2026	1 season, 10 episodes	26–30 min	United States	Pending

=== Non-English language ===
==== Korean ====
Title	Genre	Premiere	Seasons	Runtime	Exclusive region(s)	Status
Made in Korea	Period political drama	December 24, 2025	2 seasons, 12 episodes	50−82 min	All markets	Pending
Battle of Fates	Reality competition	February 11, 2026	1 season, 10 episodes	37–98 min	All markets	Pending
Deadly Tag	Reality competition	September 30, 2026	1 season, 10 episodes	69–87 min	All markets	Season 1 ongoing
The Remarried Empress	Historical romantic fantasy	November 3, 2026	10 episodes	51–58 min	All markets	Miniseries ongoing
Style Wars	Reality competition	November 11, 2026	1 season, 10 episodes	49–58 min	Selected territories	Season 1 ongoing

==== Spanish ====
Title	Genre	Premiere	Seasons	Runtime	Exclusive region(s)	Status
Olivia	Family comedy	July 1, 2026	1 season, 6 episodes	30−40 min	Selected territories	Pending
Gutiérrez Is Mai Neim	Dark crime comedy	August 26, 2026	1 season, 8 episodes	25–35 min	Selected territories	Pending
Somos así, la serie de Nadie dice nada	Comedy	November 18, 2026	1 season, 8 episodes	20 min	Latin America and Spain	Pending
Awaiting release
Caldas: El último barco	Crime drama	December 2, 2026	6 episodes	TBA	Selected territories	Pending

==== Other ====
Title	Genre	Premiere	Seasons	Runtime	Language	Exclusive region(s)	Status
Minimum Security	Workplace comedy	September 16, 2026	1 season, 8 episodes	24–28 min	French	Select territories	Renewed
Yacht Deals Monaco	Reality	September 30, 2026	1 season, 7 episodes	40–51 min	German	Selected territories	Pending

=== Continuations ===
These shows have been either picked up by Hulu for additional seasons after having aired previous seasons on another network, or were moved to Hulu from another network and premiered on the service without being marketed as Hulu Originals.

Title	Genre	Prev. network(s)	Premiere	Seasons	Length	Language	Exclusive region(s)	Status
Futurama (seasons 8–11)	Animated science-fiction sitcom	Fox (seasons 1–4); Comedy Central (seasons 5–7)	July 24, 2023	4 seasons, 40 episodes	25–26 min	English	All markets	New episode due to premiere in 2027
King of the Hill (seasons 14–15)	Animated sitcom	Fox (season 1–13); First-run syndication (remaining unaired episodes after cancellation)	August 4, 2025	2 seasons, 20 episodes	24–25 min	English	All markets	Renewed for seasons 16–17
A Thousand Blows (season 2)	Historical sports drama	Disney+ (Star Hub)	January 9, 2026	1 season, 6 episodes	43–49 min	English	All markets (Note: In the United States, previous seasons were distributed on Hulu and labeled Hulu Originals.)	Pending
The Artful Dodger (season 2)	Historical heist drama	Disney+ (Star Hub)	February 10, 2026	1 season, 8 episodes	42–51 min	English	All markets	Renewed for final season
The Boss (season 4)	Comedy drama	Star+ (seasons 1–2); Disney+ (Star Hub) (season 3)	April 30, 2026	1 season, 7 episodes	35–39 min	Spanish	Selected territories	Renewed
Impure (season 6)	Crime drama	Fox Premium (seasons 1–2); Star+ (seasons 3–4); Disney+ (Star Hub) (season 5)	May 1, 2026	1 season, 10 episodes	37–66 min	Portuguese	Selected territories	Renewed
Rivals (season 2)	Dark comedy drama	Disney+ (Star Hub)	May 15, 2026	1 season, 12 episodes	49–54 min	English	All markets	Season 2 ongoing Renewed
Welcome to Wrexham (season 5) (Note: Episodes premiere at the same time on FXX.)	Sports docuseries	FX	May 15, 2026	1 season, 8 episodes	42 min	English	All markets	Renewed for seasons 6–8
A Shop for Killers (season 2)	Action thriller	Disney+ (Star Hub)	July 22, 2026	1 season, 8 episodes	52–58 min	Korean	All markets	Season 2 ongoing
It's Always Sunny in Philadelphia (season 18)	Black comedy	FX (seasons 1–8); FXX (seasons 9–17)	August 17, 2026	1 season, 10 episodes	22–23 min	English	Selected territories	Pending
Adults (season 2) (Note: Seasons premiere at the same time on FXX.)	Coming-of-age comedy	FX	August 27, 2026	1 season, 8 episodes	21–26 min	English	All markets	Renewed
American Horror Story (season 13)	Horror anthology	FX	September 24, 2026	1 season, 13 episodes	22–39 min	English	All markets	Renewed
Benefits with Friends (season 2)	Romantic comedy	Disney+ (Star Hub)	October 9, 2026	1 season, 8 episodes	35–55 min	Portuguese	Selected territories	Pending
The Lowdown (season 2)	Crime comedy drama	FX	October 14, 2026	1 season, 8 episodes	52–53 min	English	All markets	Season 2 ongoing
Coppola, The Agent (season 2)	Biopic	Star+	October 23, 2026	1 season, 6 episodes	31–40 min	Spanish	Selected territories	Pending
The Circle (season 8)	Reality competition	Netflix	November 17, 2026	1 season, 16 episodes	50 min	English	Selected territories	Season 1 ongoing

== Upcoming original programming ==
=== Drama ===
Title	Genre	Premiere	Seasons	Length	Status
Count My Lies	Drama miniseries	TBA	TBA	TBA	Post-production
Conviction	Legal drama	TBA	TBA	TBA	Filming
Disinherited	Drama	TBA	TBA	TBA	Filming
Far Cry	Action adventure anthology	TBA	TBA	TBA	Filming
Prison Break: Black Creek	Drama	TBA	TBA	TBA	Filming
Bachelorette Weekend	Thriller	TBA	TBA	TBA	Series order
Durango	Drama	TBA	TBA	TBA	Series order
Heatwave	Drama miniseries	TBA	TBA	TBA	Series order
I'm Not Coming Back	True crime drama	TBA	TBA	TBA	Series order
Legends	Thriller miniseries	TBA	TBA	TBA	Series order
The Marriage Plot	Drama miniseries	TBA	TBA	TBA	Series order
Seven Sisters	Family drama	TBA	TBA	TBA	Series order
Victoria	Erotic thriller miniseries	TBA	TBA	TBA	Series order
The X-Files	Science fiction drama	TBA	TBA	TBA	Series order

=== Comedy ===
Title	Genre	Premiere	Seasons	Length	Status
Mosquito	Dark comedy	TBA	1 season, 6 episodes	TBA	Filming
Very Young Frankenstein	Comedy	TBA	TBA	TBA	Filming
DAD	Crime comedy drama	TBA	TBA	TBA	Series order
Glee (Note: Co-distributing with Disney+.)	Musical comedy drama	TBA	TBA	TBA	Series order
Knighted	Mystery comedy	TBA	1 season, 8 episodes	TBA	Series order
Mad Love	Romantic comedy drama	TBA	1 season, 6 episodes	TBA	Series order
The Satsuma Complex	Comedy thriller	TBA	TBA	TBA	Series order

=== Animation ===
==== Adult animation ====
Title	Genre	Premiere	Seasons	Length	Status
Deano	Comedy	TBA	1 season, 8 episodes	30 min	Series order

=== Unscripted ===
==== Docuseries ====
Title	Subject	Premiere	Seasons	Length	Status
Hunting Whitey Bulger	True crime	TBA	3 episodes	TBA	Series order
Untitled 50 Cent docuseries	Music	TBA	3 episodes	TBA	Series order
Untitled Sundance Institute docuseries	Film	TBA	3 episodes	TBA	Series order

==== Reality ====
Title	Genre	Premiere	Seasons	Length	Exclusive region(s)	Status
Blind Date	Dating show	2027	1 season, 10 episodes	45 min	Selected territories	Series order
Castle Man	Reality	TBA	TBA	TBA	Selected territories	Series order
Ring by Spring Break	Reality	TBA	TBA	TBA	Selected territories	Series order
Untitled Whitney Leavitt series	Reality	TBA	TBA	TBA	Selected territories	Series order

=== Non-English language ===
==== French ====
Title	Genre	Premiere	Seasons	Runtime	Exclusive region(s)	Status
Cancel	Thriller	2027	6 episodes	TBA	Select territories	Filming
Un automne pour te pardonner	Drama	TBA	TBA	TBA	Selected territories	Filming
Bermudes	Thriller	TBA	6 episodes	TBA	Select territories	Series order
The Last Man on Earth	Comedy	TBA	TBA	TBA	Select territories	Series order
Malik	Comedy	TBA	TBA	TBA	Select territories	Series order
Une histoire de la French Touch	Docuseries	TBA	3 episodes	TBA	Select territories	Series order

==== German ====
Title	Genre	Premiere	Seasons	Runtime	Exclusive region(s)	Status
Monster	Crime drama	2027	TBA	TBA	Selected territories	Filming
Under the Ice	Crime thriller	TBA	6 episodes	TBA	Selected territories	Filming
Westwell	Teen drama	TBA	TBA	TBA	Selected territories	Series order

==== Korean ====
Title	Genre	Premiere	Seasons	Runtime	Exclusive region(s)	Status
Portraits of Delusion	Period mystery	Late 2026	TBA	TBA	Selected territories	Filming
The Miracles of the Namiya General Store	Magical realism	2027	TBA	TBA	Selected territories	Filming
The Koreans	Spy thriller	TBA	TBA	TBA	Selected territories	Filming
Knock-Off	Black comedy	TBA	TBA	TBA	Selected territories	Filming
House of Fates	Reality	TBA	TBA	TBA	Selected territories	Series order
The Waking	Science fiction	TBA	TBA	TBA	Selected territories	Series order

==== Polish ====
Title	Genre	Premiere	Seasons	Runtime	Exclusive region(s)	Status
Everything Under Control	Comedy drama	TBA	TBA	TBA	Selected territories	Series order
The Game	Thriller	TBA	TBA	TBA	Selected territories	Series order

==== Portuguese ====
Title	Genre	Premiere	Seasons	Runtime	Exclusive region(s)	Status
Delegacia de Homicídios	Procedural	2027	TBA	TBA	Selected territories	Post-production
Trinta e Tantos	Comedy drama	2027	TBA	TBA	Selected territories	Filming
Virando o Jogo	Drama	2027	TBA	TBA	Selected territories	Series order
Americana	Period drama	TBA	1 season, 6 episodes	TBA	Selected territories	Filming

==== Spanish ====
Title	Genre	Premiere	Seasons	Runtime	Exclusive region(s)	Status
Las reglas del boxeador	Sports drama	January 2027	TBA	TBA	Selected territories	Filming
Zambrano	Dark comedy	2027	TBA	TBA	Latin America	Filming
Camaleón, el pasado no cambia	Psychological drama	TBA	TBA	TBA	Latin America	Filming
La jefa... aunque no quiera	Dark comedy	TBA	TBA	TBA	Latin America	Filming
The Incredible Story of Julia Pastrana	Historical drama	TBA	1 season, 8 episodes	35 min	Latin America	Filming
Operación Baby	True crime drama	TBA	4 episodes	45 min	Selected territories	Filming
Frida	Biographical drama	TBA	TBA	TBA	Latin America	Series order
Un Perfecto Extraño	Thriller	TBA	4 episodes	TBA	Selected territories	Filming

==== Turkish ====
Title	Genre	Premiere	Seasons	Runtime	Exclusive region(s)	Status
Aşk	Romantic drama miniseries	TBA	8 episodes	TBA	Selected territories	Series order
Ayna	Drama miniseries	TBA	8 episodes	TBA	Selected territories	Series order
Pera	Drama miniseries	TBA	8 episodes	TBA	Selected territories	Series order
The Strange Story of Gustav Maier	Supernatural romantic comedy	TBA	1 season, 8 episodes	TBA	Selected territories	Series order

==== Other ====
Title	Genre	Premiere	Seasons	Runtime	Language	Exclusive region(s)	Status
Murder on Lake Garda	Crime thriller	TBA	TBA	TBA	Italian	Selected territories	Series order

=== Co-productions ===
Title	Genre	Partner/Country	Premiere	Seasons	Length	Status
Untitled Jake and Logan Paul series	Reality competition	ESPN/United States	TBA	TBA	TBA	Series order

=== Continuations ===
Title	Genre	Prev. network(s)	Premiere	Language	Exclusive region(s)	Status
Moving (season 2)	Science fiction action thriller	Disney+ (Star Hub)	TBA	Korean	All markets	Filming
The Breslau Murders (season 2)	Historical crime drama	Disney+ (Star Hub)	TBA	Polish	Selected territories	Season order
Vigilante (season 2)	Action thriller	Disney+ (Star Hub)	TBA	Korean	All markets	Season order

=== In development ===
Title	Genre
After the Move to Nevada	Caper crime drama
American Hustlers	Crime drama
Bad Friends	Animated sitcom
Bastards	Drama
Best Offer Wins	Romance drama
Big Fan	Romantic drama
Blood Wedding	Spanish-language drama
C-League	Comedy
Capsized	Teen mystery drama
Chicks	Comedy drama
Close Protection	Romantic thriller
Confessions on the 7:45	Psychological thriller
Cruel Summer (season 3)	Teen drama
Detective Agent Derek	Adult animated comedy
Double or Nothing	Comedy
Everflame	Romantic fantasy
Gaijin	Drama
Hard Feelings	Romantic comedy
The Haunting of Alejandra	Psychological horror
The Hawk	Crime thriller
Hip Hop Cop	Drama
If I Ruled the World	Drama
Journey to the Center of the Internet	Animated comedy
Just One Day	Romance drama
The Kid Detective	Mystery comedy drama
The Kids from S.I.P.P.Y.	Animated comedy
Last Look	Comedy
Last Second Chance	Fantasy comedy
Lex	Comedy
The Mafia Nanny	Crime drama
Music Theories	Mockumentary
My Mom's Murder	Crime drama
Nepo Baby	Comedy
Not a Sound	Drama
The One That Got Away with Murder	Teen thriller
Opposing Counsel	Legal drama
The Parsifal Mosaic	Drama
The Pinnacle	Drama
Please See HR	Workplace comedy
The Poison Daughter	Romantic fantasy
Pretty Ugly	Comedy
RetroActive	Science fiction
Rock City	Comedy
Shifter	Science fiction
A Sociopath's Guide to a Successful Marriage	Dark comedy mystery
Southern Bastards	Crime drama
Stay Tuned	Workplace comedy
The Summer of Songbirds	Drama
Suspect	Crime drama
Swap Meet	Adult animated comedy
This Ain't Our First Rodeo	Teen drama
Thornbird	Teen thriller
Those Summer Storms	Drama
Townhouse	Comedy
Untitled The Cable Guy series	Comedy
Untitled Dewayne Perkins series	Comedy
Untitled Erin Foster series	Romantic comedy
Untitled Hawaiian reality series	Reality
Untitled Tracy Oliver series	Comedy
Vatican City	Drama
What Remains	Thriller
Winter Street	Drama
Wisteria Lane	Dark comedy
You Deserve to Know	Drama
Young Americans	Teen drama
