= Miranda Hope =

American influencer, singer, and reality show cast member (born 1998)

- Born: May 19, 1998 (age 28)

Instagram information
- Page: Miranda Hope
- Genres: Daily life, singing, modelling
- Followers: 1.5 million

TikTok information
- Page: Miranda Hope
- Genres: Daily life, singing, modelling
- Followers: 2.5 million

Miranda Hope, (née McWhorter; born 19 April 1998), is an American influencer, model, singer, and reality show cast member best known for her role as a member of the main cast of The Secret Lives of Mormon Wives.

== Personal Life ==
Hope was born on April 19, 1998 in Pocatello, Idaho and grew up in Rigby, Idaho. During high school, she began modeling and collaborating for photographers. She later went on to move to Utah, where she worked as a freelance model.

Hope met Chase McWhorter in 2016, after he returned from a two-year LDS mission. They married in 2017 and had two children together.

In 2024, she announced her separation from McWhorter after a viral swinging scandal involving her, Paul, McWhorter and others. Later in September 2026, McWhorter and Hope officially filed for divorce.

In 2026, rumors swirled that she had continued having relations with McWhorter, which she stated were false.

== Career ==
She became one of the founding members of "MomTok". Her popularity grew and subsequently Hope was approached to join the first season of The Secret Lives of Mormon Wives, but ultimately declined. At this time she was close friends with Taylor Frankie Paul.

Around the time of her separation from McWhorter, she took a step back from creating content with the original "MomTok" group. Later, Hope joined Mormon Wives in Season 2, with a surprise entrance, and was immediately met with hostility from her cast-mates and fan backlash. Despite this, her popularity online grew. During the show, she maintained a friendship with Layla Taylor, despite Taylor being in a relationship with McWhorter's brother.

In May 2026, Hope set McWhorter's texts to her to an emo song, leading to a reaction considering her to have a potential "future in the music industry".

Following this speculation, in mid-June 2026, Hope announced the release of her first single, "FU4THAT", which was considered a surprise. The song was officially released at the end of June. It is a country song, featured lyrics about choosing yourself, and included "a few pointed lines" towards McWhorter. Following the song release, she revealed she had been interested in being a singer since she was young and gestured towards a future EP or album.

Hope continues to create content, with a focus on beauty and daily life. Recently, Hope walked the runway during Miami Swim Week.

== Television Appearances ==
Year	Title	Notes
2025-2026	The Secret Lives of Mormon Wives	Main cast (season 2-5
