= Jan Ravnik =

Slovenian professional dancer (born 1995)

- Ravnik in 2026
- Born: 13 May 1995 (age 31); Bohinj, Slovenia
- Occupations: Dancer; choreographer
- Television: Dancing with the Stars

Jan Ravnik (Slovene: [ˈjaːn ˈráːʋnik], born 13 May 1995) is a Slovenian professional dancer and choreographer. He is best known for being one of Taylor Swift's backup dancers during the Eras Tour and a professional dancer on the American television program Dancing with the Stars.

== Life and career ==
Jan Ravnik was born on 13 May 1995 at the municipality of Bohinj in Slovenia. He first started dancing at the age of six and engaged in training by the age of eight.

Ravnik was a competitive dancer, winning multiple National, European and World champion titles. In 2015, he won first place in the show dance solo members and modern solo members categories during the IDO World Show Dance Championship held in Mikołajki, Poland and Riesa, Germany, respectively. His talent was recognized by the Slovenian Olympic Committee, which honored him with the Best Trainer/Choreographer award. He was also awarded twice as the Best Dancer of Slovenia. In 2018, he moved to the United States and now lives in Los Angeles.

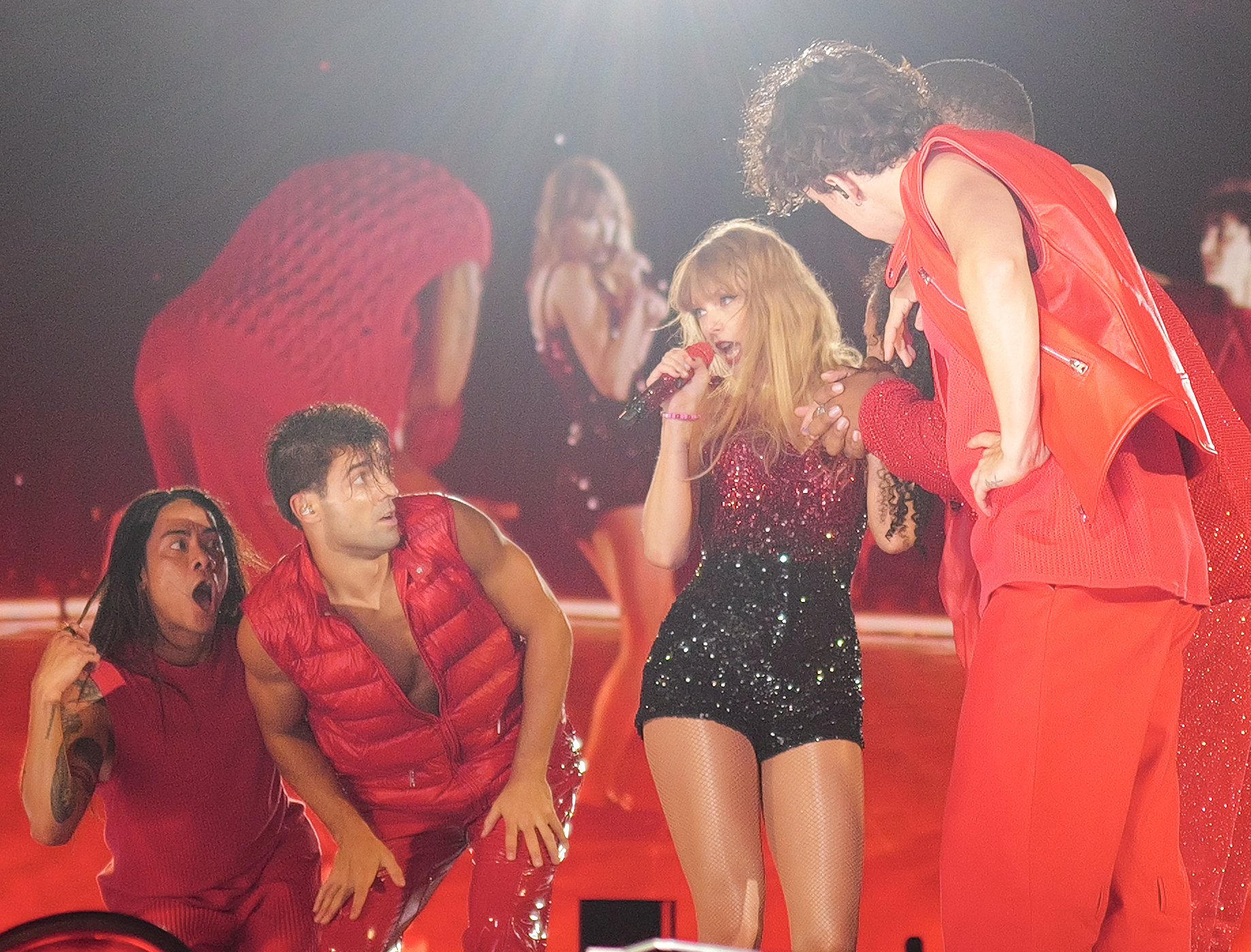
Ravnik (second from the left) performing on stage during the Eras Tour in Inglewood, California, 2023.

Ravnik toured and performed with several musicians, including Paula Abdul, Bruno Mars, Khalid, Lewis Capaldi, Luis Fonsi, Dean Lewis, and Helene Fischer. In 2022, he performed as one of Mariah Carey's backup dancers during her Merry Christmas to All! concert tour and appeared on Mariah Carey Christmas: The Magic Continues. Prior to this, he was chosen to be one of Katy Perry's dancers during her Las Vegas concert residency but later declined since it required him to forgo all his other professional projects during that time. From March 2023 to December 2024, Ravnik was a key member of the dance ensemble for the Eras Tour, Taylor Swift's sixth concert tour, and also appeared in its accompanying concert film, Taylor Swift: The Eras Tour. During this tour, he became viral due to his performance during the song "Lavender Haze".

In addition, he appeared on the 97th Academy Awards and booked shows on Evrovizijska Melodija, Slovenia's Got Talent, America's Got Talent, The X Factor, and Dick Clark's New Year's Rockin' Eve. In July 2025, he was a guest choreographer and hosted masterclasses at the 2025 Dance World Cup which took place in Burgos, Spain.

=== 2025–present: Dancing with the Stars ===
On 28 August 2025, he announced on Good Morning America that he would be joining as a professional partner for the thirty-fourth season of the American dance competition television series Dancing with the Stars, becoming the first Slovenian to become a professional partner in the show. During the full cast announcement on 3 September, Ravnik was paired with The Secret Lives of Mormon Wives star Jen Affleck. They were eliminated on week seven and came in ninth place. In season 35, he is paired with television actress and singer Tatyana Ali.

Season	Partner	Place
34	Jen Affleck	9th
35	Tatyana Ali	TBD

==== Season 34 ====
Celebrity partner: Jen Affleck

Week	Dance	Music	Judges' scores (Note: Individual judges' scores are listed in the following order: Carrie Ann Inaba, Derek Hough, Bruno Tonioli.)			Total score	Result
1	Salsa	"Nuevayol" — Bad Bunny	—N/a (Note: Carrie Ann Inaba was absent.)	6	6	12	No elimination
2	Quickstep	"Take On Me" — a-ha	8	7	7	22	Safe
3	Cha-cha-cha	"She's a Bad Mama Jama (She's Built, She's Stacked)" — Carl Carlton	7	6	6	19	Safe
4	Jazz	"Friend Like Me" from Aladdin	7	8	8	23	Safe
5	Viennese waltz	"Rescue" — Lauren Daigle	8	7	7	29 (Note: Guest judge Kym Johnson gave a score of 7.)	No elimination
6	Foxtrot	"As Long As You're Mine" — Cynthia Erivo & Jonathan Bailey	8	8	8	32 (Note: Guest judge Jon M. Chu gave a score of 8.)	Safe
7	Contemporary	"Look What You Made Me Do" — Taylor Swift	8	8	8	32 (Note: Guest judge Cheryl Burke gave a score of 8.)	Eliminated
7	Hustle & Lindy Hop Marathon	"Murder on the Dancefloor" — Sophie Ellis-Bextor "A Little Party Never Killed Nobody (All We Got)" — Fergie, Q-Tip, & GoonRock	2				Eliminated

==== Season 35 ====
Celebrity partner: Tatyana Ali

Week	Dance	Music	Judges' scores			Total score	Result
1	Jive	"Knock on Wood" — Amii Stewart	4	4	4	12	Safe
2	Foxtrot	"What Was I Made For?" — Billie Eilish	6	6	6	18	Safe
3	Quickstep	"Maneater" – Hall & Oates	7	7	7	21	Safe
4	Jazz	"Fantasy" – Mariah Carey	6	7	7	20	Safe
5	Salsa	"Squabble Up" – Kendrick Lamar	7	7	7	29 (Note: Guest judge Joe Buck gave a score of 8.)	Safe
6	Viennese waltz	"(You Don't Know) How Glad I Am" – Nancy Wilson	8	8	8	32 (Note: Guest judge Kym Johnson gave a score of 8.)	No elimination
7	Paso doble	"I Lied to You" – Miles Caton	8	8	8	28 (Note: Guest judge Shirley Ballas gave a score of 4.)	Safe
8	Contemporary	"Easy as Life" from Aida	9	8	8	33 (Note: Guest judge Cynthia Erivo gave a score of 8.)	Safe
8	Freestyle (Team Slaytopia) (Note: Composed of Alfonso Ribeiro, Amber Glenn & Pasha Pashkov, Julia Stiles & Ezra Sosa, and Maura Higgins & Mark Ballas.)	"Zoo" from Zootopia 2	9	9	9	36 (Note: Guest judge Cynthia Erivo gave a score of 9.)	Safe
9	Tango	"Boom Boom Pow" – Black Eyed Peas	9	9	9	27	Safe
9	Cha-cha-cha dance-off	"The Middle" – Zedd, Maren Morris, and Grey	Lost against Jenna Dewan & Val Chmerkovskiy			0	Safe
10	Waltz	"Open Arms" – Journey	9	9	9	27	Safe
10	Cha-cha-cha	"I Like It Like That" – Pete Rodriguez	10	9	9	28	Safe
11	Salsa	"Jamaican (Bam Bam)" – Hugel and Solto	TBD				
11	Freestyle	"Minnie the Moocher" – Cab Calloway and "Over the Rainbow" – Judy Garland	TBD				
11	Instant dance TBD		TBD				

== Dancing results ==
=== European championships ===
Year	Age division	IDO Dance discipline	Place	Ref.
2007	Junior	Show dance solos	6	
2008	Junior	Show dance solos	7	
2010	Junior	Show dance solos	4	
2010	Junior	Show dance duos	2nd place, silver medalist(s)	
2012	Adult	Show dance duos	1st place, gold medalist(s)	
2013	Adult	Modern duos	5	
2015	Adult	Show dance solos	1st place, gold medalist(s)	

=== World championships ===
Year	Age division	IDO Dance discipline	Place	Ref.
2007	Junior	Show dance solos	8	
2009	Junior	Show dance duos	6	
2010	Junior	Show dance solos	13	
2010	Junior	Show dance duos	13	
2012	Adult	Modern solos	6	
2012	Adult	Modern duos	1st place, gold medalist(s)	
2012	Adult	Show dance duos	1st place, gold medalist(s)	
2013	Adult	Modern duos	1st place, gold medalist(s)	
2014	Adult	Show dance solos	1st place, gold medalist(s)	
2014	Adult	Modern solos	1st place, gold medalist(s)	
2015	Adult	Show dance solos	1st place, gold medalist(s)	
2015	Adult	Modern solos	1st place, gold medalist(s)	
2016	Adult	Modern & contemporary solos	2nd place, silver medalist(s)	
2016	Adult	Show dance solos	2nd place, silver medalist(s)	

== Filmography ==
Year	Title	Role	Notes
2022	Mariah Carey: Merry Christmas to All!	Himself, dancer	
2023	Taylor Swift: The Eras Tour	Himself, dancer	
2025 - present	Dancing with the Stars	Himself, professional dancer	
2025	97th Academy Awards	Himself, professional dancer	
2025	Taylor Swift: The Official Release Party of a Showgirl	Himself, professional dancer	
2025	Taylor Swift: The Eras Tour - The Final Show	Himself, professional dancer	
2025	Taylor Swift: The End of an Era	Himself, professional dancer	
2026	The Secret Lives of Mormon Wives	Himself	Season 4; one episode
