= Layla Taylor =

American influencer, model, and reality show cast member

- Born: March 12, 2001 (age 25); Gilbert, Arizona, U.S.
- Occupations: Influencer, model, reality show cast member

Layla Taylor is an American influencer, model, and reality show cast member best known for being a main character in The Secret Lives of Mormon Wives. She is the youngest main cast member, and the only person of color to be a member of the main cast. In June 2026, she came out as bisexual.

== Biography ==
Taylor was born on March 12, 2001, in Gilbert, Arizona, to a Black father and a white mother. She grew up with what she's described as a "messy home life", as her parents divorced when she was 7. This drove her towards the Mormon church, as she was interested in its focus on family. She began sneaking away from home to attend church services, and eventually became baptized as a Mormon.

She had planned to attend the University of California, Irvine, which she had been accepted to, but ultimately decided to instead move to Utah, where she lived on the campus of Brigham Young University. She worked as a nanny while training to be a dental assistant.

She began using a Mormon dating app. Within a week, she met the man she would go on to marry. After an on-and-off year of dating, she got pregnant, and they got married one month later. Thirteen months after the birth of her first child, she gave birth to a second child. Ultimately, however, she divorced her husband and left her relationship, which she has subsequently described as a "toxic" relationship. She has identified as a survivor of domestic abuse in connection with it. She has discussed her subsequent struggles as a single mother, including skipping eating in order to feed her kids and being unable to work as she couldn't afford daycare.

She eventually started posting to TikTok, and received a few thousand followers. Soon, however, Taylor Frankie Paul invited her to join a group called MomTok. This eventually resulted in her casting in The Secret Lives of Mormon Wives. She is the youngest member of the main cast of the show and the only person of color in the main cast.

She has discussed her grappling with the racial history of the Mormon church and her eventual leaving of the church. She has stated that she identifies as liberal.

She has also discussed her struggles with eating disorders and her biracial identity, including hairstyle. She has stated she believes her biggest moment on the show in Season 3 was going to a Black hairstylist and changing her hairstyle. She has also criticized the show for how little airtime it gave her use of tirzepatide. She recounted her dating life, including with the brother of cast member Miranda Hope's ex-husband.

She appeared on the runway for swimwear brand Oh Polly in 2026.

On June 29, 2026, Taylor came out as bisexual on an episode of Jay Shetty's podcast, revealing that she had dated both men and women in the past. She also announced that she was in a relationship with a woman. After the revelation, most of her fellow cast members expressed support. A week later, she shared a video of her with the arm of her girlfriend in frame.
