= Jennifer Affleck =

Jennifer Affleck may refer to:

- Jennifer Garner (born 1972), American actress married to Ben Affleck from 2005 to 2018
- Jennifer Lopez (born 1969), American musician and actress married to Ben Affleck from 2022 to 2024
- Jennifer Lynn Affleck (born 1999), American media personality and social media influencer
