= The Bachelorette (American TV series) season 22 =

Unaired season of television series

The Bachelorette
- Season 22
- Promotional poster with original date
- Starring: Taylor Frankie Paul
- Presented by: Jesse Palmer
- No. of contestants: 22
- No. of episodes: 10 (planned)

Release
- Original network: ABC
- Original release: March 22, 2026 (unaired)

Additional information
- Filming dates: October 26 – December 19, 2025

Season chronology
- ← Previous; Season 21

The twenty-second season of The Bachelorette was originally set to premiere on March 22, 2026. The season was to feature 31-year-old Taylor Frankie Paul, a reality TV star, influencer, and single mom from Herriman, Utah. Paul, who is one of the stars of The Secret Lives of Mormon Wives, would have been the first ever Bachelorette to have not appeared on a previous season of The Bachelor.

On March 19, three days before the season premiere, TMZ published a video of a 2023 domestic violence incident in which Paul assaulted her ex-boyfriend, Dakota Mortensen. Although the case had been publicly disclosed and reported in the media before Paul's casting and filming, the release of the video prompted Disney Entertainment Television to pull the season from its ABC broadcast schedule.

== Production ==
Paul was announced as the next Bachelorette on September 10, 2025, on Alex Cooper's Call Her Daddy podcast. Among the contestants cast were Lana Del Rey's ex-fiancé Clayton Johnson, and Paralympian Trenten Merrill. Filming began on October 26, 2025, in Agoura Hills, California, and concluded on December 19 in Saint Lucia. The season included visits to Steamboat Springs, Colorado; Las Vegas, Nevada; and Miami, Florida.

A special half-hour preview episode, "Before the First Rose", aired following ABC's telecast of the 98th Academy Awards on March 15, 2026. The special featured an ensemble of 18 Bachelorettes from previous seasons meeting Paul to share their advice, accompanied by retrospectives of notable moments from their respective seasons.

== Domestic violence dispute and cancellation ==
Before she was cast as the Bachelorette, a 2023 domestic violence case involving Paul was publicly known. Paul was arrested on February 17, 2023, after her ex-boyfriend, Dakota Mortensen, called police to report she was assaulting him. She was charged with assault, criminal mischief, and domestic violence in the presence of a child. The Salt Lake Tribune reported that police had viewed a video of the altercation, which showed Paul throwing heavy metal chairs towards Mortensen, one of which hit her five-year-old daughter. Court documents show that she admitted to throwing the chairs. She entered a plea in abeyance in August 2023 to a third-degree felony count of aggravated assault. Four other charges were dismissed without prejudice.

In March 2026, a spokesperson for the Draper City Police Department confirmed reports of an "open domestic assault investigation" concerning Paul and Mortensen. The incident is presumably separate from the 2023 case. Allegations of domestic violence were "made in both directions" and "contact was made with involved parties" in late February. The investigation prompted The Secret Lives of Mormon Wives to halt production for their fifth season. Cinnabon, a baked goods store chain, ended their partnership with both The Bachelorette and The Secret Lives of Mormon Wives in the wake of the allegations. Spokespeople for ABC initially said that The Bachelorette would air as planned. Paul claimed that she would address the investigation "when the time is right" during an appearance on Good Morning America. She was scheduled to appear on The Tonight Show Starring Jimmy Fallon afterwards, but her appearance was canceled by the talk show due to the investigation.

On March 19, three days before the season premiere, TMZ published a video of the 2023 assault incident filmed by Mortensen. That same day, Disney Entertainment Television announced that "in light of the newly released video," they would not broadcast Paul's season of The Bachelorette and wished to focus on "supporting the family."

== Speculation on release ==
Following the reveal that Taylor Frankie Paul faced no new criminal charges, Rob Mills, an executive of ABC is open to airing the season. On May 8, a planned inclusion for the summer schedule was canceled.

It was even later revealed that on June 25, 2026 that editors of the show never stopped the footage during post-production, speculating that ABC would be targeting a mid-July premiere but it did not happen. On August 14, 2026, over 20,000 people signed onto Change.org demanding the release of their season. It is revealed that on September 3, 2026 that the spoilers of the season were unearthed. On September 12, 2026, it is confirmed that she was indeed single and made a chance to release her tapes or else do a second round. As late as October 2026, it is speculated that Taylor Frankie Paul had told ABC that there is a 100% chance to release the season. On November 6, 2026, it is announced that ABC is moving forward with the 30th season of The Bachelor on March 21, 2027.

Taylor had verified after Sam Hartman got cast that stated "I don't think so anymore. I remain hopeful though" and joked about applying for the 30th season of The Bachelor.

== Contestants ==
26 potential contestants were revealed on October 23, 2025. The finalized cast of 22 men was announced on February 23, 2026 prior to its cancellation.

Spoilers from the fifth season of The Secret Lives of Mormon Wives later revealed that Doug Mason was named the winner of the season and was engaged to Paul before Paul decided to call off the engagement.

| Name | Age | Hometown | Occupation | Ref |
|---|---|---|---|---|
| Aaron Kahng | 32 | Bellevue, Washington | Product Manager | |
| Brad Ledford | 29 | Asheville, North Carolina | Cowboy | |
| Brandon Perce | 28 | West Allis, Wisconsin | Loan Officer | |
| Casey Hux | 30 | Midlothian, Virginia | Mechanical Engineer | |
| Christopher Wood | 35 | Rowlett, Texas | Business Owner | |
| Clayton Johnson | 36 | Nashville, Tennessee | Singer/Songwriter | |
| Conrad Ukropina | 32 | Pasadena, California | Startup Founder | |
| Doug Mason | 28 | Hailey, Idaho | Ocean Lifeguard | |
| Johnnie LaRossa | 30 | Massapequa, New York | Former Professional Baseball Player | |
| Josh Harward | 28 | Provo, Utah | Sales Manager | |
| Kevin Montero | 32 | Miami, Florida | Physical Therapist | |
| Lew Evans | 32 | Salt Lake City, Utah | Insurance Tech Founder | |
| Malik Evans | 30 | Brooklyn, New York | Tech Executive | |
| Marcus Richardson | 28 | Elmont, New York | Creative Director | |
| Matt Carroll | 43 | Carmel, Indiana | Real Estate Broker | |
| Michael Baba | 37 | Lake Forest, California | Chiropractic Healer | |
| Mike Turitto | 36 | Lavallette, New Jersey | Brand Protection Manager | |
| Richard Van De Water | 35 | Charleston, South Carolina | Photographer | |
| Rod Strozier | 35 | Apple Valley, Minnesota | Entrepreneur | |
| Ronn Perez | 28 | San Francisco, California | Account Executive | |
| Shane Parton | 28 | Roswell, Georgia | Private Wealth Planner | |
| Trenten Merrill | 35 | Laguna Niguel, California | Pro Athlete | |

=== Future appearances ===
Despite never competing, Shane Parton competed in the Hulu show The Mob.

== See also ==
- Megan Wants a Millionaire, a 2009 dating reality show cancelled mid-season due to the murder of Jasmine Fiore
