= Trenten Merrill =

American Paralympic athlete

Personal information
- Born: May 18, 1990 (age 36) Laguna Niguel, California, U.S.
- Height: 5 ft 11 in (180 cm)

Sport
- Country: United States
- Sport: Paralympic athletics
- Disability class: T64
- Event: long jump
Medal record
Paralympic athletics
Representing the United States
Summer Paralympics
Bronze medal – third place	2020 Tokyo	long jump T64
World Championships
Bronze medal – third place	2024 Kobe	Long jump T64
Parapan American Games
Gold medal – first place	2019 Lima	long jump T64

Trenten Merrill (born May 18, 1990) is an American Paralympic athlete who specializes in long jump. He represented the United States at the 2016 and 2020 Summer Paralympics. Merrill's right foot was amputated after a dirt bike accident.

== Career ==
Merrill attended Azusa Pacific University where he competed on the school's NCAA Division II track and field team.

Merrill represented the United States at the 2016 Summer Paralympics in the men's long jump T44 event and finished in fourth place with an American Record of 6.84-metres.

He represented the United States at the 2019 Parapan American Games where he won a gold medal in the long jump T63/T64 event.

Merrill represented the United States at the 2020 Summer Paralympics in the men's long jump T64 event and won a bronze medal.

He competed in the men's long jump T64 event at the 2023 World Para Athletics Championships held in Paris, France.

== Personal life ==
In March 2005 a bicycle accident caused the amputation of Merril's foot. When not competing in athletics, he is also a model. Merrill was set to compete in season 22 of The Bachelorette in 2026, but the season did not air following the release of a video showing that season's Bachelorette assaulting her ex-boyfriend.
