= Jen Affleck =

American media personality (born 1999)

- Born: May 29, 1999 (age 27); Provo, Utah, U.S.
- Occupations: Media personality; videographer; influencer
- Spouse: Zac Affleck (m. 2019; sep. 2026)
- Children: 3

Instagram information
- Page: jenniferlaffleck
- Years active: 2012–present
- Genres: Motherhood, Reality TV, Lifestyle
- Followers: 1.7 million

TikTok information
- Page: jenniferaffleckk
- Years active: 2019–present
- Genres: Motherhood, Reality TV, Lifestyle, Humour
- Followers: 2.8 million
- Last updated: November 16, 2026

Jennifer Lynn Affleck (born May 29, 1999) is an American media personality and social media influencer. She gained prominence through her appearances on the Hulu reality television series The Secret Lives of Mormon Wives and its spinoff series The Secret Lives of Mormon Wives: Orange County (2024–present). Affleck also competed on season 34 of the ABC competition series Dancing with the Stars.

== Career ==
Affleck began a wedding videography business in January 2021. The same year, she gained popularity on TikTok while posting content about her pregnancy. By 2024, she came to be associated with MomTok, a group of influencers made up of young Mormon mothers. By 2025, Affleck had more than 4 million followers across her Instagram and TikTok accounts.

In July 2024, Affleck was revealed to be a member of the cast of Hulu's The Secret Lives of Mormon Wives. The show premiered on September 6, 2024. While she was a main cast member in the first season, her role in the second season of the show was reduced after she learned she was pregnant with her third child. She returned to the main cast for the third, fourth and fifth seasons. In April 2026, Affleck announced on TikTok that she would join the cast of the spinoff series The Secret Lives of Mormon Wives: Orange County.

On The Secret Lives of Mormon Wives second season reunion special, host Nick Viall announced that Affleck and co-star Whitney Leavitt would join the cast of the thirty-fourth season of the ABC competition series Dancing with the Stars. Affleck was partnered with professional dancer Jan Ravnik. During her appearance on Good Morning America, Affleck mentioned she as was only eight weeks postpartum with her third child when the season premiered in September 2025. Affleck and Ravnik were eliminated on the seventh episode of the season.

== Personal life ==
Affleck was born on May 29, 1999, in Provo, Utah, to an Ecuadorian mother and an American father. She was raised Mormon in San Francisco, California, with two biological siblings, two adoptive siblings, and "over twenty" foster children. She still considers herself to be religious.

She married Zac Affleck on June 28, 2019. They separated in 2025, but later reconciled. The couple have three children together and are currently expecting their fourth child (announced June 2026). Throughout their marriage they lived in Utah, New York City, and California. In November 2026, four months after announcing her fourth pregnancy, Affleck filed for divorce.

== Television Credits ==
Year	Title	Note
2024-present	The Secret Lives of Mormon Wives	Main cast (seasons 1,3-5); recurring (season 2)
2025	Vanderpump Villa	Guest appearance; Season 2 Episode 3: "MomToks and Mormons, Oh My!" and Season 2 Episode 4: "Fireworks and Falling Apart"
2025	Dancing With The Stars	Contestant (season 34): Eliminated 9th
2026-present	The Secret Lives of Mormon Wives: Orange County	Main cast
