= The Mob (TV series) =

American reality competition show

- Genre: Reality; Game show
- Presented by: Parker Posey
- Country of origin: United States
- Original language: English
- No. of seasons: 1
- No. of episodes: 8

Production
- Camera setup: Multi-camera
- Production company: Studio Lambert

Original release
- Network: Hulu
- Release: October 26 – November 16, 2026

The Mob is an American reality competition series that premiered on Hulu on October 26, 2026.

== Format ==
A group of celebrity contestants, "The Family", are sent to an Italian villa where they compete for a cash prize of $100,000 and various other prizes. Each episode, they must complete a series of mob movie-inspired jobs to win cash and power. Following the challenge, they must select one contestant to be the "don", who hold all the power on who receives their cut of the money and who is eliminated or "whacked".

== Contestants ==
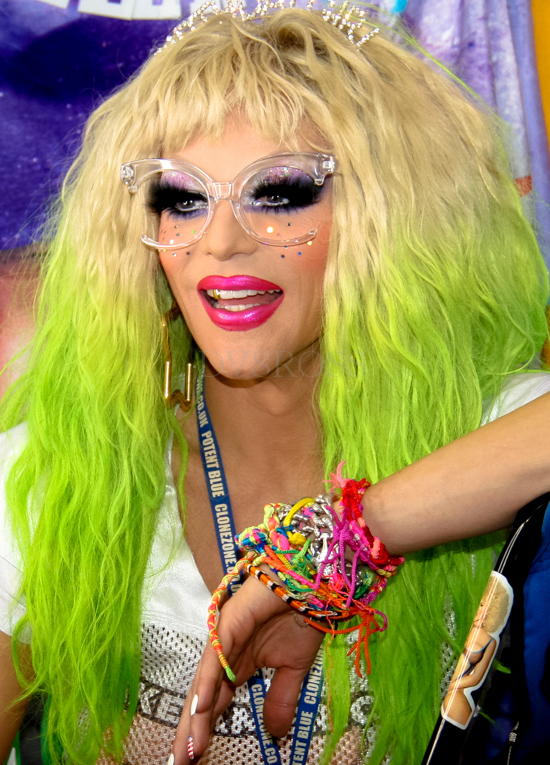
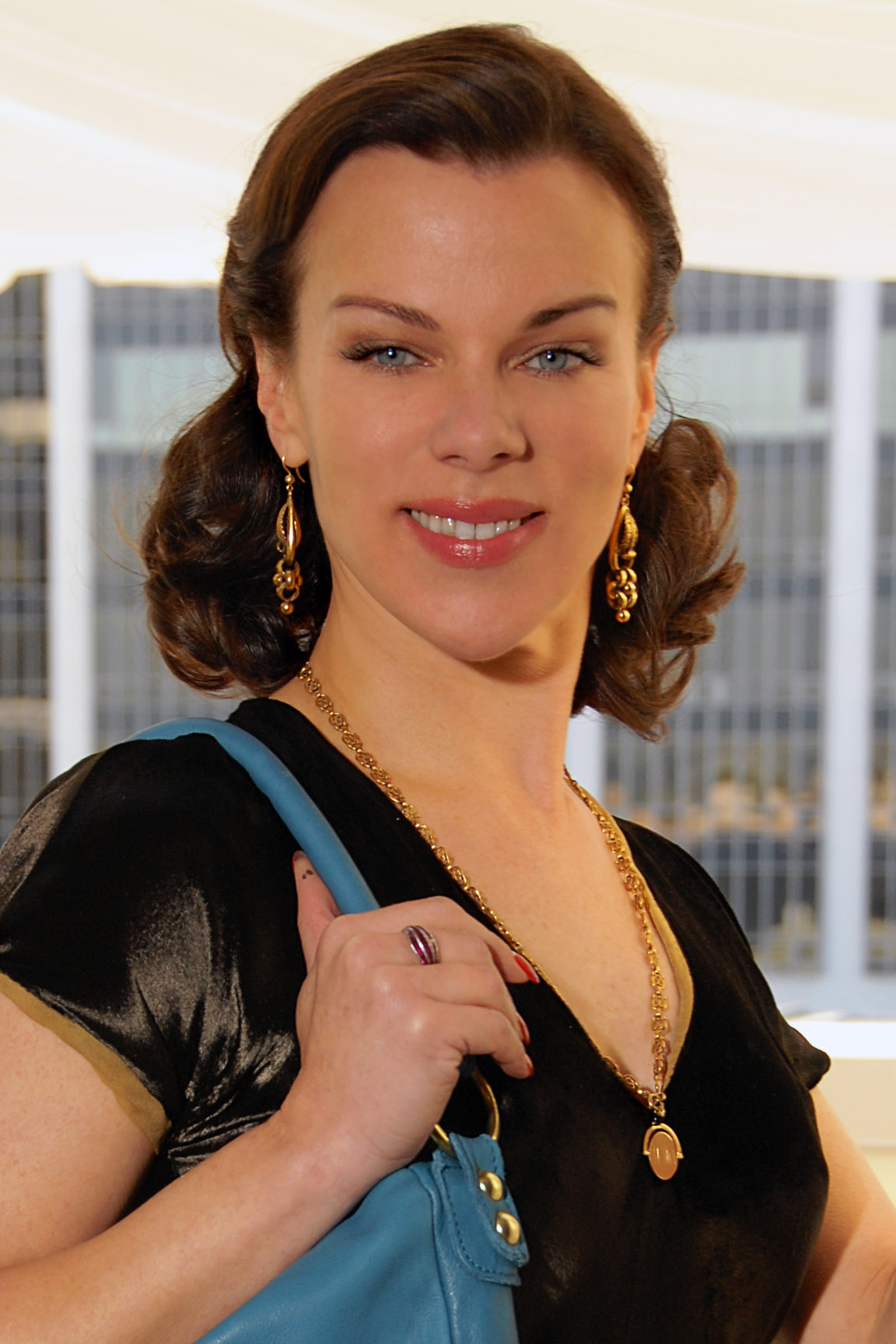
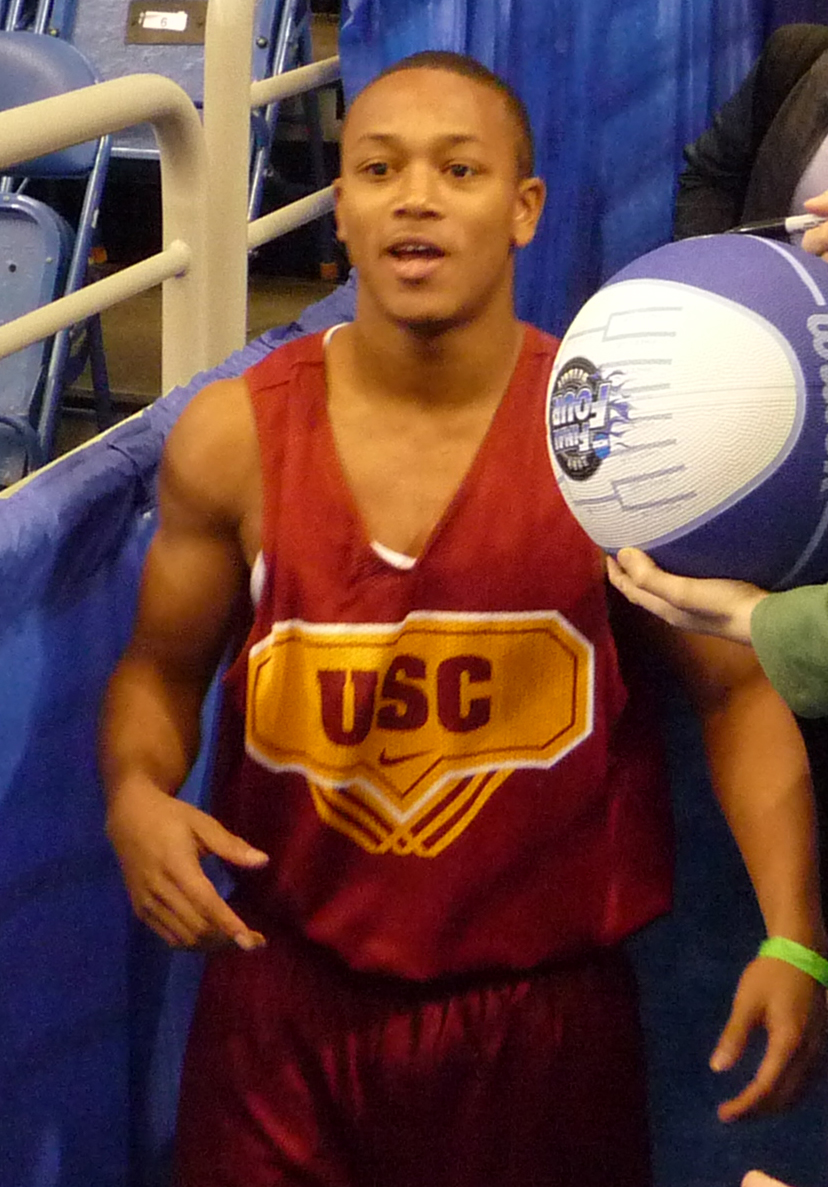
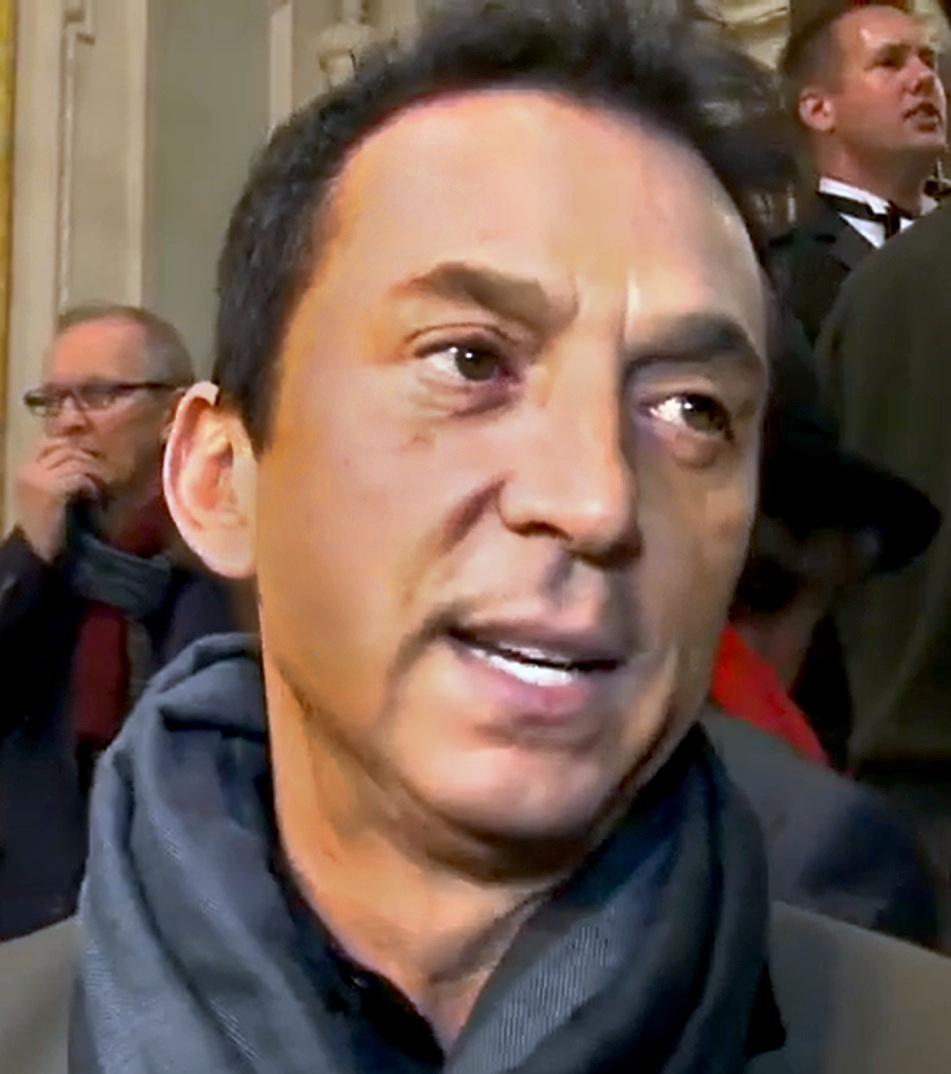
From left to right: Willam Belli, Harry Jowsey, Debi Mazar, Romeo Miller, Bruno Tonioli and Aida Turturro

The cast was composed entirely of reality show participants and public figures - many with an Italian heritage or a connection to depictions of the Mafia in pop culture. The 12 original players were announced on September 10, 2026.

List of The Mob contestants
Contestant	Age	Hometown	Notability/Debut series	Finish
Chelsea Lazkani	33	Los Angeles, California	Selling Sunset	Winners
Maria Georgas	32	Kleinburg, Ontario	The Bachelor 28	Winners
Shane Parton	28	Roswell, Georgia	The Bachelorette 22 (Note: Show did not air due to backlash of Bachelorette's ex-boyfriend.)	Winners
Harry Jowsey	29	Yeppoon, Queensland	Too Hot to Handle 1	Whacked (Episode 8)
Demi Engemann	32	Salt Lake City, Utah	The Secret Lives of Mormon Wives	Whacked (Episode 7)
Willam Belli	44	Philadelphia, Pennsylvania	RuPaul's Drag Race 4	Whacked (Episode 6)
Debi Mazar	62	New York City, New York	Actress	Whacked (Episode 6)
Joe Gorga	52	Paterson, New Jersey	The Real Housewives of New Jersey	Whacked (Episode 4)
Romeo Miller	37	New Orleans, Louisiana	Television personality	Whacked (Episode 4)
Aida Turturro	64	New York City, New York	Actress	Whacked (Episode 4)
Bruno Tonioli	70	New Orleans, Louisiana	Dancing with the Stars	Whacked (Episode 3)
Bella Palk	23	Kansas City, Missouri	Love Overboard	Whacked (Episode 1)

== Episodes ==
The Mob episodes
No.	Title	Original release date
1	"Kiss the Ring"	October 26, 2026
2	"There’s Always a Rat"	October 26, 2026
3	"This Is a Deadly Game"	November 2, 2026
4	"Going to War"	November 2, 2026
5	"Turns Out, I Am That Bitch"	November 9, 2026
6	"I Can Spot a Fake From a Mile Away"	November 9, 2026
7	"You Can Never Be Too Comfortable"	November 16, 2026
8	"What Would Tony Soprano Do?"	November 16, 2026

== Elimination chart ==
Color key:

Winner
Runner-up
The Don
Received a Cut
Whacked

Episode	1	2	3	4	5	6	7	8	
The Don	Joe			Harry	Demi	Maria			
Job money	$15,000	$12,000	$12,000	$18,000	$18,000	$6,000	$30,000	$100,000	
Received a Cut	Chelsea; Debi; Demi; Joe; Willam	Demi; Harry; Joe	Joe; Romeo; Willam	Chelsea; Maria; Romeo; Shane; Willam	Chelsea; Debi; Maria	Harry	Chelsea; Maria; Shane	Chelsea; Maria; Shane	
Chelsea	Cut	Safe	Safe	Cut	Cut	Safe	Cut	Cut	Winners (Episode 8)
Maria	Safe	Safe	Safe	Cut	Cut	The Don	The Don	The Don	Winners (Episode 8)
Shane	Safe	Safe	Safe	Cut	Safe	Safe	Cut	Cut	Winners (Episode 8)
Harry	Safe	Cut	Safe	The Don	Safe	Cut	Safe	Whacked	Eliminated (Episode 8)
Demi	Cut	Cut	Safe	Safe	The Don	Safe	Whacked	Eliminated (Episode 7)	
Willam	Cut	Safe	Cut	Cut	Safe	Whacked	Eliminated (Episode 6)		
Debi	Cut	Safe	Safe	Safe	Whacked	Eliminated (Episode 6)			
Joe	The Don	The Don	The Don	Whacked	Eliminated (Episode 4)				
Romeo	Safe	Safe	Cut	Whacked	Eliminated (Episode 4)				
Aida	Safe	Safe	Whacked	Eliminated (Episode 4)					
Bruno	Safe	Whacked	Eliminated (Episode 3)						
Bella	Whacked	Eliminated (Episode 1)							
Whacked	Bella; Joe's choice to wack	Bruno; Joe's choice to wack	Aida; Joe's choice to wack	Joe; Harry's choice to wack	Debi; Demi's choice to wack	Willam; Maria's choice to wack	Demi; Maria's choice to wack	Harry; Maria's choice to wack	Chelsea; Maria; Shane; Maria's choice to split equally
Whacked	Bella; Joe's choice to wack	Bruno; Joe's choice to wack	Aida; Joe's choice to wack	Romeo; Harry's choice to wack	Debi; Demi's choice to wack	Willam; Maria's choice to wack	Demi; Maria's choice to wack	Harry; Maria's choice to wack	Chelsea; Maria; Shane; Maria's choice to split equally

== Jobs ==
Episode	Title	Money available	Money earned	The Don	Received a Cut
1	"Kiss the Ring"	$18,000	$15,000	Joe	Chelsea ($3,000)
1	"Kiss the Ring"	$18,000	$15,000	Joe	Debi ($3,000)
1	"Kiss the Ring"	$18,000	$15,000	Joe	Demi ($3,000)
1	"Kiss the Ring"	$18,000	$15,000	Joe	Joe ($3,000)
1	"Kiss the Ring"	$18,000	$15,000	Joe	Willam ($3,000)
2	"There’s Always a Rat"	$24,000	$12,000	Joe	Demi ($3,000)
2	"There’s Always a Rat"	$24,000	$12,000	Joe	Harry ($3,000)
2	"There’s Always a Rat"	$24,000	$12,000	Joe	Joe ($6,000)
3		$30,000	$12,000	Joe	TBD

== Production ==
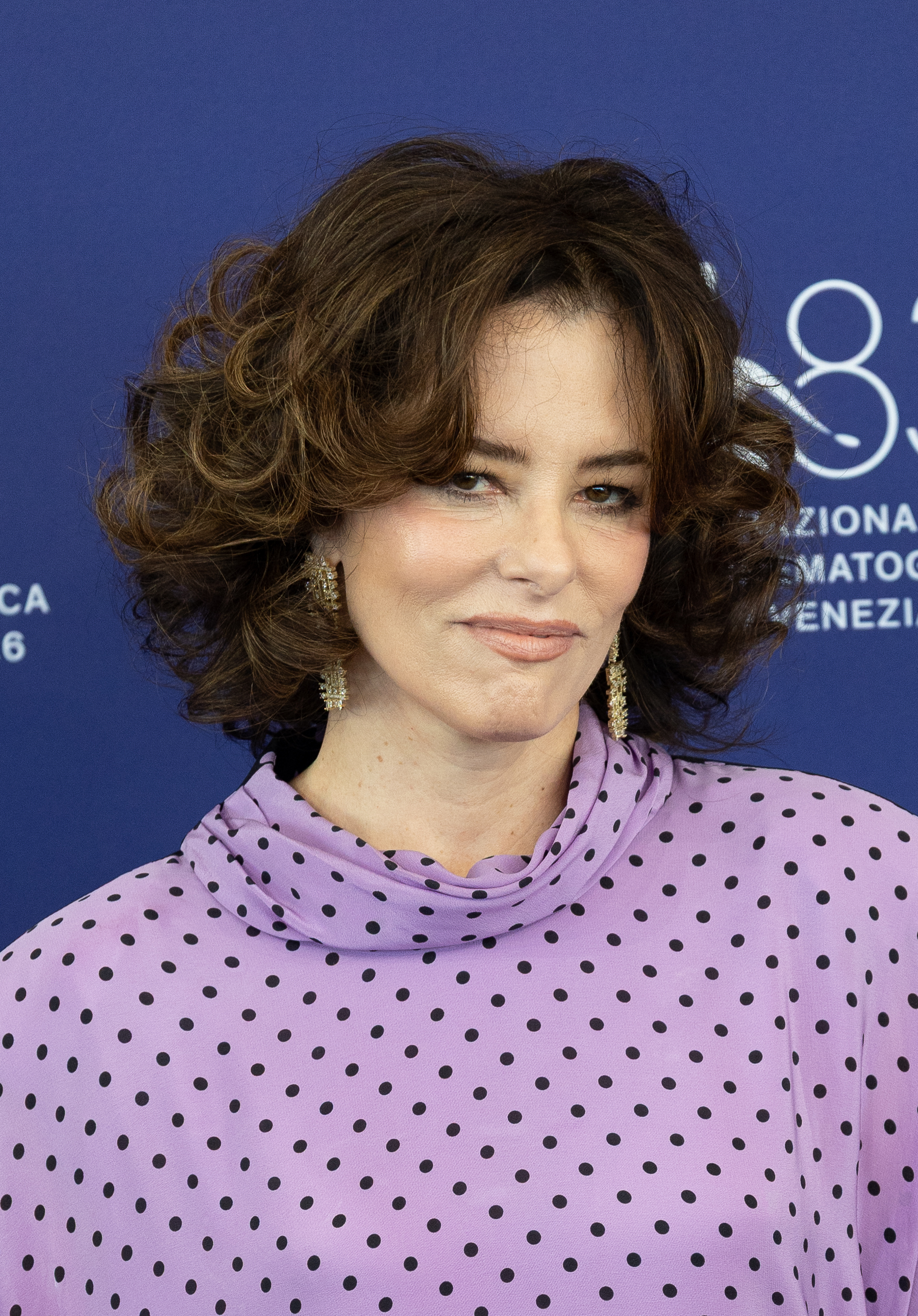
The host of The Mob

The show was produced Primal Media and also by the same company, Studio Lambert, as The Traitors. Parker Posey joined the show host and executive producer while Susan House serves as showrunner.
