= Dancing with the Stars (American TV series) season 34 =

Dancing with the Stars
- Season 34
- Promotional poster for season 34, featuring hosts Alfonso Ribeiro and Julianne Hough, and the celebrity cast
- Hosted by: Alfonso Ribeiro; Julianne Hough
- Judges: Derek Hough; Carrie Ann Inaba; Bruno Tonioli
- Celebrity winner: Robert Irwin
- Professional winner: Witney Carson
- No. of episodes: 12

Release
- Original network: ABC; Disney+
- Original release: September 16 – December 2, 2025

Season chronology
- ← Previous; Season 33 Next → Season 35

Season thirty-four of Dancing with the Stars premiered on ABC and Disney+ on September 16, 2025, and concluded on December 2, 2025. This season, marking the twentieth anniversary of the series, was the third to air live on both networks simultaneously and the first of ABC's unscripted programs to earn an official renewal for their 2025–26 schedule. Season nineteen champion Alfonso Ribeiro returned to host the installment, while former professional dancer and judge Julianne Hough returned as co-host.

Wildlife conservationist Robert Irwin and Witney Carson were crowned the champions, while social media personality Alix Earle and Val Chmerkovskiy finished in second place, Olympic artistic gymnast Jordan Chiles and Ezra Sosa finished third, reality television personality Dylan Efron and Daniella Karagach finished fourth, and actress Elaine Hendrix and Alan Bersten finished fifth. A holiday television special aired following the season finale.

== Cast ==
=== Couples ===
On April 22, 2025, during an upfront for Hulu's unscripted programming, Robert Irwin was announced as the first celebrity participant for the thirty-fourth season. He is the younger brother of season twenty-one winner, Bindi Irwin. Alix Earle joined the cast one month later. On June 30, during The Secret Lives of Mormon Wives' second season reunion special, host Nick Viall revealed that Jen Affleck and Whitney Leavitt were joining Dancing with the Stars. Affleck announced the birth of her third child two days later; she was eight weeks postpartum when the season premiered. On August 25, Entertainment Tonight reported that Hilaria Baldwin joined the cast; People confirmed her appearance the following day. Jordon Hudson was originally cast to compete on the season, but she declined due to conflicts of interest. The full roster of celebrity participants and their partnerships was officially revealed on Good Morning America on September 3.

According to Parade, Artem Chigvintsev was not slated to return as a professional dancer this season. Entertainment journalist Kristyn Burtt announced that Mark Ballas, Britt Stewart, Brandon Armstrong, Rylee Arnold, Ezra Sosa, Emma Slater, Valentin Chmerkovskiy, Daniella Karagach, Pasha Pashkov, Alan Bersten, Witney Carson, Gleb Savchenko, and the reigning champion Jenna Johnson were slated to return. Ballas competed for the first time since winning the thirty-first season with Charli D'Amelio. Before his appearance was confirmed, Savchenko said he was not cast to return to Dancing with the Stars amid cheating allegations from his ex-girlfriend and season thirty-three partner, Brooks Nader. Jan Ravnik, former backup dancer for Taylor Swift's Eras Tour, joined the series as a first-time pro. Although Sasha Farber did not return as a pro this season, he was involved in other capacities.

Cast of Dancing with the Stars (season 34)
Celebrity	Notability	Professional partner	Status	Ref.
Baron Davis	NBA point guard	Britt Stewart	Eliminated 1st & 2nd on September 23, 2025	
Corey Feldman	Film & television actor	Jenna Johnson	Eliminated 1st & 2nd on September 23, 2025	
Lauren Jauregui	Fifth Harmony singer	Brandon Armstrong	Eliminated 3rd on September 30, 2025	
Hilaria Baldwin	Yoga instructor, podcaster & entrepreneur	Gleb Savchenko	Eliminated 4th on October 7, 2025	
Scott Hoying	Pentatonix singer	Rylee Arnold	Eliminated 5th on October 21, 2025	
Jen Affleck	The Secret Lives of Mormon Wives cast member	Jan Ravnik	Eliminated 6th on October 28, 2025	
Danielle Fishel	Boy Meets World actress	Pasha Pashkov	Eliminated 7th on November 4, 2025	
Andy Richter	Actor & comedian	Emma Slater; Kaitlyn Bristowe (Week 9)	Eliminated 8th on November 11, 2025	
Whitney Leavitt	The Secret Lives of Mormon Wives cast member	Mark Ballas	Eliminated 9th on November 18, 2025	
Elaine Hendrix	Film & television actress	Alan Bersten; Rashad Jennings (Week 9)	Fifth place on November 25, 2025	
Dylan Efron	Reality television personality	Daniella Karagach; Rumer Willis (Week 9)	Fourth place on November 25, 2025	
Jordan Chiles	Olympic artistic gymnast	Ezra Sosa; Apolo Anton Ohno (Week 9)	Third place on November 25, 2025	
Alix Earle	Social media personality	Val Chmerkovskiy; Joey Graziadei (Week 9)	Runners-up on November 25, 2025	
Robert Irwin	Wildlife conservationist & television presenter	Witney Carson; Xochitl Gomez (Week 9)	Winners on November 25, 2025	

=== Hosts and judges ===
Alfonso Ribeiro and Julianne Hough returned as hosts for the season. Derek Hough, Carrie Ann Inaba and Bruno Tonioli returned as judges. Inaba missed the season premiere due to an undisclosed illness; there was no replacement judge set in her place. An official Dancing with the Stars podcast, hosted by season thirty-three winner Joey Graziadei, was launched on September 18, 2025. He revealed all of the season's themes during the inaugural episode, and later shared the freestyle songs for the season finale.

Kym Johnson served as the guest judge for Dedication Night. Jon M. Chu served as the guest judge for Wicked Night. Cheryl Burke served as the guest judge for Halloween Night. Flavor Flav served as a guest judge for Rock & Roll Hall of Fame Night. Tom Bergeron served as the guest judge for the 20th Birthday Party.

=== Dance troupe ===
Hailey Bills, Onye Stevenson, Carter Williams, and Jaxon Willard joined the show as first-time troupe members. Bills is the niece of Jenna Johnson and a former pro on Dancing with the Stars: Juniors. Williams was a top six finalist on the seventeenth season of So You Think You Can Dance. Willard was a contestant on the second season of World of Dance.

== Episodes ==
No. overall	No. in season	Title	Rating (18–49) (Note: Ratings are for ABC viewership, does not include Disney+ viewership.)	Original release date	U.S. viewers (millions)
503	1	"Premiere"	1.06	September 16, 2025	5.38
504	2	"One-Hit Wonders Night"	1.02	September 23, 2025	5.46
505	3	"TikTok Night"	1.22	September 30, 2025	5.82
506	4	"Disney Night"	1.26	October 7, 2025	5.88
507	5	"Dedication Night"	1.26	October 14, 2025	5.98
508	6	"Wicked Night"	1.38	October 21, 2025	6.63
509	7	"Halloween Night"	1.36	October 28, 2025	6.74
510	8	"Rock & Roll Hall of Fame Night"	1.22	November 4, 2025	6.33
511	9	"20th Birthday Party"	1.30	November 11, 2025	6.67
512	10	"Prince Night (Semi-Finals)"	1.50	November 18, 2025	7.22
513	11	"Finale"	2.15	November 25, 2025	9.24
514	12	"Dancing with the Holidays"	0.65	December 2, 2025	5.19

== Scoring chart ==
The highest score each week is indicated in bold green with a dagger (†), while the lowest score each week is indicated in italicized red with a double-dagger (‡).

Color key:

Winners
Runners-up
Third place
Fourth place
Fifth place
Eliminated

Dancing with the Stars (season 34) - Weekly scores
Couple	Pl.	Week												
Couple	Pl.	1 (Note: The couples were scored on a 20-point scale due to Carrie Ann Inaba's absence.)	2	1+2	3	4	5 (Note: The couples were scored on a 40-point scale due to the presence of a guest judge.)	6	5+6	7	8	9	10	11
Robert & Witney	1st	**15**†	**22**†	**37**†	22	22	35	36	71	38+3=41	38+38=76	40+2=**42**†	30+29=**59**†	29+30+30=89 (Note: This couple finished in first place.)
Alix & Val	2nd	13	21	34	23	24	35	35	70	39+4=**43**†	39+38=77	40	28+30=58	30+30+30=**90**† (Note: This couple finished in second place.)
Jordan & Ezra	3rd	10	**22**†	32	**24**†	24	32	**39**†	71	34+4=38	38+40=78	37+2=39	27+30=57	29+30+30=89 (Note: This couple finished in third place.)
Dylan & Daniella	4th	10	20	30	23	23	**36**†	32	68	35+3=38	36+40=76	40+2=**42**†	27+28=55‡	28+30+30=88 (Note: This couple finished in fourth place.)
Elaine & Alan	5th	12	21	33	21	24	30	36	66	32+0=32	37+38=75	36	27+30=57	30+27+30=87‡ (Note: This couple finished in fifth place.)
Whitney & Mark	6th	**15**†	**22**†	**37**†	**24**†	**25**†	33	**39**†	**72**†	37+5=42	39+40=**79**†	40+2=**42**†	29+29=58 (Note: This couple was eliminated.)	
Andy & Emma	7th	9‡	16	25	18‡	18‡	24‡	27‡	51‡	28+1=29‡	30+38=68‡	29‡		
Danielle & Pasha	8th	12	19	31	21	21	29	36	65	33+2=35	34+40=74			
Jen & Jan	9th	12	**22**†	34	19	23	29	32	61	32+2=34				
Scott & Rylee	10th	10	18	28	22	21	30	28	58					
Hilaria & Gleb	11th	14	21	35	22	23								
Lauren & Brandon	12th	13	21	34	18‡									
Baron & Britt	13th	10	18	28										
Corey & Jenna	13th	9‡	15‡	24‡										

== Weekly scores ==
Individual judges' scores in the charts below (given in parentheses) are listed in this order from left to right: Carrie Ann Inaba, Derek Hough, Bruno Tonioli.

=== Week 1: Premiere ===
Individual judges' scores in the charts below (given in parentheses) are listed in this order from left to right: Derek Hough, Bruno Tonioli.

Each couple performed one unlearned dance to a "personal anthem" of the celebrity. There was no elimination this week; all scores were carried over to the following week. Carrie Ann Inaba missed this episode due to an undisclosed illness, so the couples were judged on a 20-point scale instead of the usual 30-point scale. The opening number, choreographed by Ray Leeper, was set to "Kill the Lights" by Whitney Myer. The troupe also performed a number to "Just Keep Watching" by Tate McRae.

Couples are listed in the order they performed.

Dancing with the Stars (season 34) - Week 1
Couple	Scores	Dance	Music
Jordan & Ezra	10 (5, 5)	Salsa	"Break My Soul" — Beyoncé
Dylan & Daniella	10 (5, 5)	Cha-cha-cha	"Milkshake" — Kelis
Elaine & Alan	12 (6, 6)	Cha-cha-cha	"Woman" — Kesha, feat. the Dap-Kings Horns
Whitney & Mark	15 (7, 8) (Note: Bruno officially submitted a score of 8 for Whitney & Mark, but showed a 7 during the judges' reveal.)	Tango	"Golden" — Huntrix
Baron & Britt	10 (5, 5)	Cha-cha-cha	"U Can't Touch This" — MC Hammer
Alix & Val	13 (7, 6)	Cha-cha-cha	"Circus" — Britney Spears
Scott & Rylee	10 (5, 5)	Tango	"Abracadabra" — Lady Gaga
Danielle & Pasha	12 (6, 6)	Tango	"Stronger (What Doesn't Kill You)" — Kelly Clarkson
Jen & Jan	12 (6, 6)	Salsa	"Nuevayol" — Bad Bunny
Corey & Jenna	9 (4, 5)	Tango	"It's Still Rock and Roll to Me" — Billy Joel
Lauren & Brandon	13 (7, 6)	Tango	"Yes, And?" — Ariana Grande
Andy & Emma	9 (5, 4)	Cha-cha-cha	"Hold On, I'm Comin'" — Sam & Dave
Hilaria & Gleb	14 (7, 7)	Cha-cha-cha	"Let's Get Loud" — Jennifer Lopez
Robert & Witney	15 (8, 7)	Jive	"Born to be Wild" — Steppenwolf

=== Week 2: One-Hit Wonders Night ===
Each couple performed one unlearned dance to a song by a one-hit wonder. A double elimination took place this week. The opening number, choreographed by Emma Slater, was set to "Gonna Make You Sweat (Everybody Dance Now)" by C+C Music Factory feat. Freedom Williams. The troupe also performed numbers to "I Like to Move It" by Reel 2 Real feat. the Mad Stuntman and "Lady (Hear Me Tonight)" by Modjo.

Couples are listed in the order they performed.

Dancing with the Stars (season 34) - Week 2
Couple	Scores	Dance	Music	Result
Alix & Val	21 (7, 7, 7)	Jive	"Mambo No. 5" — Lou Bega	Safe
Danielle & Pasha	19 (7, 6, 6)	Cha-cha-cha	"The Rhythm of the Night" — Corona	Safe
Andy & Emma	16 (6, 5, 5)	Tango	"It's Raining Men" — The Weather Girls	Safe
Lauren & Brandon	21 (7, 7, 7)	Foxtrot	"Lovefool" — The Cardigans	Safe
Jordan & Ezra	22 (8, 7, 7)	Jive	"Maniac" — Michael Sembello	Safe
Corey & Jenna	15 (5, 5, 5)	Cha-cha-cha	"Baby Got Back" — Sir Mix-a-Lot	Eliminated
Jen & Jan	22 (8, 7, 7)	Quickstep	"Take On Me" — a-ha	Safe
Robert & Witney	22 (8, 7, 7)	Tango	"Move Your Feet" — Junior Senior	Safe
Elaine & Alan	21 (7, 7, 7)	Jive	"Hey Mickey" — Toni Basil	Safe
Baron & Britt	18 (6, 6, 6)	Samba	"Return of the Mack" — Mark Morrison	Eliminated
Whitney & Mark	22 (7, 7, 8)	Cha-cha-cha	"Play That Funky Music" — Wild Cherry	Safe
Hilaria & Gleb	21 (7, 7, 7)	Tango	"What Is Love" — Haddaway	Safe
Dylan & Daniella	20 (7, 6, 7)	Samba	"Macarena (Bayside Boys Remix)" — Los del Río	Safe
Scott & Rylee	18 (6, 6, 6)	Cha-cha-cha	"Blue (Da Ba Dee)" — Eiffel 65	Safe

=== Week 3: TikTok Night ===
Each couple performed one unlearned dance to a song that went viral on the social media platform TikTok. The opening number was set to "Apple" by Charli XCX and featured season 31 champion Charli D'Amelio, with viral moves created by actor and content creator Kelley Heyer. The troupe performed a number to "No Broke Boys" by Disco Lines and Tinashe. They also performed a number with D'Amelio to "Savage" by Megan Thee Stallion, choreographed by Jenna Johnson Chmerkovskiy and Britt Stewart with viral moves created by content creator Keke Janajah. D'Amelio also performed with her season 31 pro partner Mark Ballas to "Assumptions" by Sam Gellaitry.

Couples are listed in the order they performed.

Dancing with the Stars (season 34) - Week 3
Couple	Scores	Dance	Music	Result
Jen & Jan	19 (7, 6, 6)	Cha-cha-cha	"She's a Bad Mama Jama (She's Built, She's Stacked)" — Carl Carlton	Safe
Lauren & Brandon	18 (6, 6, 6)	Cha-cha-cha	"Work from Home" — Fifth Harmony, feat. Ty Dolla Sign	Eliminated
Danielle & Pasha	21 (7, 7, 7)	Foxtrot	"Manchild" — Sabrina Carpenter	Safe
Jordan & Ezra	24 (8, 8, 8)	Tango	"Anxiety" — Doechii	Safe
Dylan & Daniella	23 (7, 8, 8)	Foxtrot	"Yukon" — Justin Bieber	Safe
Elaine & Alan	21 (7, 7, 7)	Tango	"Gnarly" — Katseye	Safe
Whitney & Mark	24 (8, 8, 8)	Samba	"Shake Ya Ass (Radio Edit)" — Mystikal	Safe
Scott & Rylee	22 (8, 7, 7)	Jazz	"Like Jennie" — Jennie	Safe
Hilaria & Gleb	22 (7, 8, 7)	Samba	"Shake It to the Max (Fly) [Remix]" — Moliy, Silent Addy, Skillibeng & Shenseea	Safe
Andy & Emma	18 (6, 6, 6)	Foxtrot	"Northern Attitude" — Noah Kahan & Hozier	Safe
Robert & Witney	22 (8, 7, 7)	Salsa	"Million Dollar Baby" — Tommy Richman	Safe
Alix & Val	23 (8, 7, 8)	Quickstep	"Pop Muzik" — M/Robin Scott	Safe

=== Week 4: Disney Night ===
To celebrate the seventieth anniversary of Disneyland, each couple performed one unlearned dance to a song inspired by a Disney film or attraction. The opening number, choreographed by Mandy Moore, was set to "Be Our Guest" from Beauty and the Beast (1991) and featured a guest appearance from Danny Gardner, who stars as Lumière on the North American tour of its accompanying stage musical. The troupe performed numbers to "As Alive as You Need Me to Be" from Tron: Ares (2025) and "The Tiki Tiki Room" from Walt Disney's Enchanted Tiki Room.

Couples are listed in the order they performed.

Dancing with the Stars (season 34) - Week 4
Couple	Scores	Dance	Music	Disney film/attraction	Result
Dylan & Daniella	23 (7, 8, 8)	Quickstep	"Life Is a Highway"	Cars	Safe
Danielle & Pasha	21 (7, 7, 7)	Quickstep	"I Wan’na Be Like You (The Monkey Song)"	The Jungle Book	Safe
Scott & Rylee	21 (7, 7, 7)	Salsa	"Bop to the Top"	High School Musical	Safe
Alix & Val	24 (8, 8, 8)	Viennese waltz	"Once Upon a Dream"	Maleficent	Safe
Hilaria & Gleb	23 (8, 7, 8)	Quickstep	"Cantina Band"	Star Wars: A New Hope	Eliminated
Andy & Emma	18 (6, 6, 6)	Viennese waltz	"Le Festin"	Ratatouille	Safe
Robert & Witney	22 (7, 7, 8)	Cha-cha-cha	"Try Everything"	Zootopia	Safe
Elaine & Alan	24 (8, 8, 8)	Quickstep	"Space Mountain"	Space Mountain	Safe
Whitney & Mark	25 (9, 8, 8)	Foxtrot	"The Room Where It Happens"	Hamilton	Safe
Jordan & Ezra	24 (8, 8, 8)	Quickstep	"Special Spice"	Tiana's Bayou Adventure	Safe
Jen & Jan	23 (7, 8, 8)	Jazz	"Friend Like Me"	Aladdin	Safe

=== Week 5: Dedication Night ===
Individual judges' scores in the charts below (given in parentheses) are listed in this order from left to right: Carrie Ann Inaba, Derek Hough, Kym Johnson, Bruno Tonioli.

Each couple performed one unlearned dance to honor the most influential figures and institutions in the celebrities' lives. No eliminations took place this week; all scores were carried over to the following week. Two-time mirrorball champion Kym Johnson returned as a guest judge. For the first time on the series, the friends and family members selected by each celebrity contestant joined them on the ballroom floor for their routines. Before performing his foxtrot, Scott Hoying and his husband, Mark Hoying, revealed that they were expecting their first child via surrogacy.

The troupe performed numbers to "Mystical Magical" by Benson Boone and "Man I Need" by Olivia Dean. Additional pro performances were set to "Green Light" by Lorde, choreographed by Jenna Johnson and Britt Stewart featuring a guest appearance from Julianne Hough, and "Back on 74" by Jungle, choreographed by Brandon Armstrong.

Couples are listed in the order they performed.

Dancing with the Stars (season 34) - Week 5
Couple	Scores	Dance	Music	Dedicated to
Andy & Emma	24 (6, 6, 6, 6)	Salsa	"Jump In the Line" — Harry Belafonte	Cornelia, Andy's adoptive daughter
Robert & Witney	35 (8, 9, 9, 9)	Contemporary	"You'll Be in My Heart" — Phil Collins	Terri Irwin, Robert's mother
Elaine & Alan	30 (8, 7, 7, 8)	Foxtrot	"This Will Be (An Everlasting Love)" — Natalie Cole	Lisa Ann Walter, Elaine's best friend and The Parent Trap co-star
Whitney & Mark	33 (9, 8, 8, 8)	Contemporary	"Heal" — Jamal Roberts	Conner Leavitt, Whitney's husband
Jen & Jan	29 (8, 7, 7, 7)	Viennese waltz	"Rescue" — Lauren Daigle	Maria, Jen's mother
Dylan & Daniella	36 (9, 9, 9, 9)	Contemporary	"Rewrite the Stars" — Zac Efron & Zendaya	Olivia Efron, Dylan's younger sister
Jordan & Ezra	32 (8, 8, 8, 8)	Viennese waltz	"Daughters" — John Mayer	Timothy Chiles, Jordan's father
Scott & Rylee	30 (7, 8, 7, 8)	Foxtrot	"Parallel" — Scott Hoying	Mark Hoying, Scott's husband
Danielle & Pasha	29 (7, 7, 7, 8)	Jive	"Boy Meets World (Theme)" — Twenty Cent Crush feat. Phil Rosenthal	William Daniels, Danielle's Boy Meets World co-star
Alix & Val	35 (8, 9, 9, 9)	Contemporary	"Sparks" — Coldplay	Izabel Earle, Alix's younger half-sister

=== Week 6: Wicked Night ===
Individual judges' scores in the charts below (given in parentheses) are listed in this order from left to right: Carrie Ann Inaba, Derek Hough, Jon M. Chu, Bruno Tonioli.

Each couple performed one unlearned dance to a song from either the musical fantasy film Wicked (2024) or its then-upcoming sequel, Wicked: For Good (2025). Jon M. Chu, who directed both films, appeared as a guest judge. The episode featured a never-before-seen clip from Wicked: For Good as well as video messages from its cast, including Cynthia Erivo, Ariana Grande, Jonathan Bailey and Michelle Yeoh. The opening number, choreographed by Christopher Scott, was set to a medley of songs from both films: "No One Mourns the Wicked", "Defying Gravity", "For Good", "Thank Goodness", "Dancing Through Life", and "What Is This Feeling?". The troupe also performed a number to "Wonderful" from Wicked: For Good.

Couples are listed in the order they performed.

Dancing with the Stars (season 34) - Week 6
Couple	Scores	Dance	Wicked / Wicked: For Good music	Result
Scott & Rylee	28 (7, 7, 7, 7)	Contemporary	"The Wizard and I" — Cynthia Erivo, feat. Michelle Yeoh	Eliminated
Alix & Val	35 (9, 9, 8, 9)	Jazz	"What Is This Feeling?" — Ariana Grande & Cynthia Erivo	Safe
Robert & Witney	36 (9, 9, 9, 9)	Jazz	"Dancing Through Life" — Jonathan Bailey, feat. Ariana Grande, Ethan Slater, Marissa Bode & Cynthia Erivo	Safe
Whitney & Mark	39 (10, 9, 10, 10)	Quickstep	"Popular" — Ariana Grande	Safe
Dylan & Daniella	32 (8, 8, 8, 8)	Rumba	"I'm Not That Girl" — Cynthia Erivo	Safe
Andy & Emma	27 (7, 6, 7, 7)	Jazz	"One Short Day" — Cynthia Erivo, Ariana Grande, Kristin Chenoweth & Idina Menzel, feat. Michael McCorry Rose	Safe
Elaine & Alan	36 (9, 9, 9, 9)	Contemporary	"Defying Gravity" — Cynthia Erivo, feat. Ariana Grande	Safe
Jen & Jan	32 (8, 8, 8, 8)	Foxtrot	"As Long As You're Mine" — Cynthia Erivo & Jonathan Bailey	Safe
Danielle & Pasha	36 (9, 9, 9, 9)	Argentine tango	"No Good Deed" — Cynthia Erivo	Safe
Jordan & Ezra	39 (10, 9, 10, 10)	Rumba	"For Good" — Cynthia Erivo & Ariana Grande	Safe

=== Week 7: Halloween Night ===
Individual judges' scores in the charts below (given in parentheses) are listed in this order from left to right: Carrie Ann Inaba, Derek Hough, Cheryl Burke, Bruno Tonioli.

Each couple performed one unlearned dance and then participated in a dance marathon (featuring the hustle and the Lindy Hop) for bonus points. Two-time mirrorball champion Cheryl Burke returned as a guest judge. The episode featured pro performances to "Sympathy is a Knife" by Charli XCX feat. Ariana Grande and "The Dead Dance" by Lady Gaga. Jan Ravnik and Jenna Johnson additionally performed a routine to "Cancelled!" by Taylor Swift.

During dress rehearsals, Elaine Hendrix was injured and was taken to the emergency room. As she was unable to return for her Argentine tango, the judges' scores were based on dress rehearsal footage. She also was excluded from earning bonus points in the dance marathon.

Couples are listed in the order they performed.

Dancing with the Stars (season 34) - Week 7
Couple	Scores	Dance	Music	Result
Whitney & Mark	37 (9, 9, 9, 10)	Jazz	"Brain Stew" — Green Day	Safe
Jordan & Ezra	34 (9, 8, 8, 9)	Contemporary	"Elastic Heart" — Sia	Safe
Andy & Emma	28 (7, 7, 7, 7)	Paso doble	"Symphony No. 5 in C Minor, Op. 67: I. Allegro con brio" — Ludwig van Beethoven	Safe
Elaine & Alan	32 (8, 8, 8, 8)	Argentine tango	"Bad to the Bone" — 2WEI & Bri Bryant	Safe
Danielle & Pasha	33 (8, 8, 8, 9)	Viennese waltz	"Die with a Smile" — Lady Gaga & Bruno Mars	Safe
Robert & Witney	38 (10, 9, 9, 10)	Argentine tango	"Sweet Dreams (Are Made of This)" — Hampton String Quartet	Safe
Jen & Jan	32 (8, 8, 8, 8)	Contemporary	"Look What You Made Me Do" — Taylor Swift	Eliminated
Alix & Val	39 (10, 10, 9, 10)	Tango	"Bury a Friend" — Billie Eilish	Safe
Dylan & Daniella	35 (9, 9, 8, 9)	Viennese waltz	"Can't Help Falling in Love (Dark)" — Tommee Profitt & Brooke	Safe
Elaine & Alan	0	Hustle & Lindy Hop; Marathon	"Murder on the Dancefloor" — Sophie Ellis-Bextor & "A Little Party Never Killed Nobody (All We Got)" — Fergie, Q-Tip, & GoonRock	
Andy & Emma	1	Hustle & Lindy Hop; Marathon	"Murder on the Dancefloor" — Sophie Ellis-Bextor & "A Little Party Never Killed Nobody (All We Got)" — Fergie, Q-Tip, & GoonRock	
Jen & Jan	2	Hustle & Lindy Hop; Marathon	"Murder on the Dancefloor" — Sophie Ellis-Bextor & "A Little Party Never Killed Nobody (All We Got)" — Fergie, Q-Tip, & GoonRock	
Danielle & Pasha	2	Hustle & Lindy Hop; Marathon	"Murder on the Dancefloor" — Sophie Ellis-Bextor & "A Little Party Never Killed Nobody (All We Got)" — Fergie, Q-Tip, & GoonRock	
Dylan & Daniella	3	Hustle & Lindy Hop; Marathon	"Murder on the Dancefloor" — Sophie Ellis-Bextor & "A Little Party Never Killed Nobody (All We Got)" — Fergie, Q-Tip, & GoonRock	
Robert & Witney	3	Hustle & Lindy Hop; Marathon	"Murder on the Dancefloor" — Sophie Ellis-Bextor & "A Little Party Never Killed Nobody (All We Got)" — Fergie, Q-Tip, & GoonRock	
Jordan & Ezra	4	Hustle & Lindy Hop; Marathon	"Murder on the Dancefloor" — Sophie Ellis-Bextor & "A Little Party Never Killed Nobody (All We Got)" — Fergie, Q-Tip, & GoonRock	
Alix & Val	4	Hustle & Lindy Hop; Marathon	"Murder on the Dancefloor" — Sophie Ellis-Bextor & "A Little Party Never Killed Nobody (All We Got)" — Fergie, Q-Tip, & GoonRock	
Whitney & Mark	5	Hustle & Lindy Hop; Marathon	"Murder on the Dancefloor" — Sophie Ellis-Bextor & "A Little Party Never Killed Nobody (All We Got)" — Fergie, Q-Tip, & GoonRock	

=== Week 8: Rock & Roll Hall of Fame Night ===
Individual judges' scores in the charts below (given in parentheses) are listed in this order from left to right: Carrie Ann Inaba, Derek Hough, Flavor Flav, Bruno Tonioli.

Each couple performed one unlearned dance to a song by an artist or group who was either inducted into the Rock and Roll Hall of Fame (RRHOF) or are slated to be. They also participated in a team dance, which featured live performances from RRHOF inductees Kool & the Gang and Chicago. Rapper and television personality Flavor Flav, who is also a RRHOF inductee, appeared as a guest judge.

The teams were chosen by the celebrities with the lowest combined scores, Andy and Danielle. A plot twist was also involved; co-hosts Alfonso Ribeiro and Julianne Hough each joined a team for their dance. The opening number, choreographed by Britt Stewart, was set to "Pour Some Sugar on Me" by Def Leppard and "Fight the Power" by Public Enemy. The professional dancers who joined the Dancing with the Stars: Live! tour in 2026 performed a routine to "Hey Ya!" by Outkast, choreographed by Mandy Moore. The troupe was originally slated to perform a number to "Higher Ground" by Stevie Wonder, but they instead performed to "I Love L.A." by Randy Newman to celebrate the Los Angeles Dodgers winning the 2025 World Series.

Couples are listed in the order they performed.

Dancing with the Stars (season 34) - Week 8
Couple	Scores	Dance	Music	Result
Dylan & Daniella	36 (8, 9, 10, 9)	Jive	"I'm Still Standing" — Elton John	Safe
Alix & Val	39 (10, 10, 9 (Note: Flavor Flav officially submitted a score of 9 for Alix & Val, but he wanted to give them a 10. He said his original score was an accident.), 10)	Paso doble	"Livin' on a Prayer" — Bon Jovi	Safe
Andy & Emma	30 (7, 7, 9, 7)	Contemporary	"God Only Knows" — The Beach Boys	Safe
Whitney & Mark	39 (9, 10, 10, 10)	Paso doble	"No More Tears" — Ozzy Osbourne	Safe
Danielle & Pasha	34 (9, 8, 9, 8)	Contemporary	"Dream On" — Aerosmith	Eliminated
Elaine & Alan	37 (9, 9, 10, 9)	Viennese waltz	"What the World Needs Now is Love" — Dionne Warwick	Safe
Jordan & Ezra	38 (10, 9, 10, 9)	Jazz	"River Deep – Mountain High" — Ike & Tina Turner	Safe
Robert & Witney	38 (9, 9, 10, 10)	Paso doble	"Icky Thump" — The White Stripes	Safe
Alfonso Ribeiro Danielle & Pasha Whitney & Mark Jordan & Ezra Dylan & Daniella	40 (10, 10, 10, 10)	Freestyle (Team Chicago)	"25 or 6 to 4" — Chicago	
Julianne Hough Andy & Emma Robert & Witney Alix & Val Elaine & Alan	38 (9, 10, 10, 9)	Freestyle (Team Kool)	"Celebration" — Kool & the Gang	

=== Week 9: 20th Birthday Party ===
Individual judges' scores in the charts below (given in parentheses) are listed in this order from left to right: Carrie Ann Inaba, Derek Hough, Tom Bergeron, Bruno Tonioli.

In celebration of the twentieth anniversary of Dancing with the Stars, each couple reinterpreted a memorable freestyle performance by showcasing an unlearned dance style. Six couples also participated in a dance relay, featuring the quickstep, Viennese waltz and jive, for two bonus points. The dance relays featured a special twist to commemorate the milestone; for the first time ever, celebrities danced without their professional partners, instead joining forces with a returning mirrorball champion. For receiving the highest cumulative points in the season so far, Whitney & Mark earned immunity from the dance relays and automatically received two bonus points.

Tom Bergeron, who hosted Dancing with the Stars for its first twenty-eight seasons, appeared as a guest judge. The opening number, choreographed by Derek Hough, was set to a reimagined version of the "Dancing with the Stars Theme" by Ray Chew. It featured the current lineup of professional dancers and troupe members, as well as the six original pros from the first season: Alec Mazo, Ashly DelGrosso, Louis van Amstel, Jonathan Roberts, Charlotte Jørgensen, and Edyta Śliwińska. The episode also held an in memoriam segment with a routine to "Always Remember Us This Way" by Lady Gaga, choreographed and performed by Ezra Sosa and Rylee Arnold.

Couples are listed in the order they performed.

Dancing with the Stars (season 34) - Week 9
Couple	Scores	Dance	Music	Inspiration	Result
Elaine & Alan	36 (9, 9, 9, 9)	Salsa	"It Takes Two" — Rob Base & DJ E-Z Rock	Mario Lopez & Karina Smirnoff; Season 3	Safe
Robert & Witney	40 (10, 10, 10, 10)	Foxtrot	"Footprints in the Sand" — Leona Lewis	Bindi Irwin & Derek Hough; Season 21	Safe
Andy & Emma	29 (8, 7, 7, 7)	Quickstep	"Puttin' on the Ritz" — Robbie Williams	Jordan Fisher & Lindsay Arnold; Season 25	Eliminated
Dylan & Daniella	40 (10, 10, 10, 10)	Argentine tango	"Ain't No Sunshine" — Bill Withers	Milo Manheim & Witney Carson; Season 27	Safe
Jordan & Ezra	37 (9, 10, 9, 9)	Cha-cha-cha	"Get Up" — Ciara, feat. Chamillionaire	Wayne Brady & Witney Carson; Season 31	Safe
Alix & Val	40 (10, 10, 10, 10)	Foxtrot	"Singin' in the Rain" — Matthew Morrison	Nev Schulman & Jenna Johnson; Season 29	Safe
Whitney & Mark	40 (10, 10, 10, 10)	Argentine tango	"Cell Block Tango" (from Chicago)	Gabby Windey & Val Chmerkovskiy; Season 31	Safe

Dance relay
Couple	Dance	Music	Result
Jordan & Apolo Anton Ohno (Season 4 winner)	Quickstep; Relay	"I Get a Kick Out of You" — Michael Bublé	Winners
Elaine & Rashad Jennings (Season 24 winner)	Quickstep; Relay	"I Get a Kick Out of You" — Michael Bublé	Losers
Dylan & Rumer Willis (Season 20 winner)	Viennese waltz Relay	"Earned It" — The Weeknd	Winners
Andy & Kaitlyn Bristowe (Season 29 winner)	Viennese waltz Relay	"Earned It" — The Weeknd	Losers
Robert & Xochitl Gomez (Season 32 winner)	Jive; Relay	"Dance with Me Tonight" — Olly Murs	Winners
Alix & Joey Graziadei (Season 33 winner)	Jive; Relay	"Dance with Me Tonight" — Olly Murs	Losers

=== Week 10: Prince Night (Semi-Finals) ===
Each couple performed two dances to songs by Prince: one unlearned style and a repeat style that gave them the chance to showcase their improvement. The opening number, choreographed by Luam Keflezgy, was set to "Let's Go Crazy". The troupe also performed a number to "Musicology".

Couples are listed in the order they performed.

Dancing with the Stars (season 34) - Week 10
Couple	Scores	Dance	Prince music	Result
Elaine & Alan	27 (9, 9, 9)	Foxtrot	"I Wanna Be Your Lover"	Safe
Elaine & Alan	30 (10, 10, 10)	Paso doble	"When Doves Cry"	Safe
Alix & Val	28 (9, 10, 9)	Argentine tango	"Little Red Corvette"	Safe
Alix & Val	30 (10, 10, 10)	Viennese waltz	"Purple Rain"	Safe
Whitney & Mark	29 (9, 10, 10)	Cha-cha-cha	"1999"	Eliminated
Whitney & Mark	29 (9, 10, 10)	Viennese waltz	"Slow Love"	Eliminated
Dylan & Daniella	27 (9, 9, 9)	Tango	"I Would Die 4 U"	Safe
Dylan & Daniella	28 (9, 9, 10)	Cha-cha-cha	"Kiss"	Safe
Jordan & Ezra	27 (9, 9, 9)	Jive	"Raspberry Beret"	Safe
Jordan & Ezra	30 (10, 10, 10)	Argentine tango	"U Got the Look"	Safe
Robert & Witney	30 (10, 10, 10)	Jive	"Baby I'm a Star"	Safe
Robert & Witney	29 (10, 9, 10)	Viennese waltz	"WOW"	Safe

=== Week 11: Finale ===
For the three-hour finale, each couple performed three dances: an unlearned dance selected and coached by one of the judges, an instant dance, and their freestyle routine. For the instant dance round, the couples had approximately five minutes to choreograph and learn a new dance before performing it live. Although the assigned dance styles and songs were not known beforehand by the couples, they were told that it would be one of four dance styles they had performed earlier in the season.

The opening number, choreographed by Joey Pizzi, was set to "Never Can Say Goodbye" by the Communards. All of the eliminated couples returned to the ballroom with additional performances to "Sugar on My Tongue" by Tyler, the Creator, "Applause" by Lady Gaga, and "I Don't Dance" by Alexander Jean. The professional dancers featured on the Dancing with the Stars: Live! tour in 2026 performed a routine to "Sapphire" by Ed Sheeran, choreographed by Mandy Moore. Additional troupe and pro performances were set to "Talk Talk" by Charli XCX featuring Troye Sivan and "The Fate of Ophelia (Alone in My Tower Acoustic Version)" by Taylor Swift. Season 33 champions Joey Graziadei and Jenna Johnson returned for a performance to "Tanguera" by Fabio Hager Sexteto.

Couples are listed in the order they performed.

Dancing with the Stars (season 34) - Week 11
Couple	Judge	Scores	Dance	Music	Result
Alix & Val	Carrie Ann Inaba	30 (10, 10, 10)	Samba	"Hip Hip Chin Chin" — Club des Belugas	Runners-up
Alix & Val	Carrie Ann Inaba	30 (10, 10, 10)	Cha-cha-cha	"Where Is My Husband" — RAYE	Runners-up
Alix & Val	Carrie Ann Inaba	30 (10, 10, 10)	Freestyle	"Maneater" — Nelly Furtado & "Sports Car" — Tate McRae	Runners-up
Dylan & Daniella	Bruno Tonioli	28 (9, 9, 10)	Paso doble	"Stampede" — Alexander Jean, feat. Lindsey Stirling	Fourth place
Dylan & Daniella	Bruno Tonioli	30 (10, 10, 10)	Foxtrot	"Ordinary" — Alex Warren	Fourth place
Dylan & Daniella	Bruno Tonioli	30 (10, 10, 10)	Freestyle	"Something in the Heavens" — Lewis Capaldi	Fourth place
Elaine & Alan	Derek Hough	30 (10, 10, 10)	Rumba	"Take My Breath Away" — Jae Hall	Fifth place
Elaine & Alan	Derek Hough	27 (9, 9, 9)	Quickstep	"You Can't Hurry Love" — The Supremes	Fifth place
Elaine & Alan	Derek Hough	30 (10, 10, 10)	Freestyle	"I Hope I Get It" — District 78 (from A Chorus Line)	Fifth place
Robert & Witney	Derek Hough	29 (9, 10, 10)	Quickstep	"Are You Gonna Be My Girl" — Jet	Winners
Robert & Witney	Derek Hough	30 (10, 10, 10)	Cha-cha-cha	"Cake by the Ocean" — DNCE	Winners
Robert & Witney	Derek Hough	30 (10, 10, 10)	Freestyle	"Black and Gold" — Sam Sparro & "The Nights" — Avicii	Winners
Jordan & Ezra	Carrie Ann Inaba	29 (9, 10, 10)	Paso doble	"Breakin' Dishes" — Rihanna	Third place
Jordan & Ezra	Carrie Ann Inaba	30 (10, 10, 10)	Tango	"I Like It" — Alesso & Nate Smith	Third place
Jordan & Ezra	Carrie Ann Inaba	30 (10, 10, 10)	Freestyle	"Bow Down (Homecoming Live)" — Beyoncé & "Motivation" — Normani	Third place

== Dance chart ==
The couples performed the following each week:

- Weeks 1–6: One unlearned dance
- Week 7: One unlearned dance & dance marathon
- Week 8: One unlearned dance & team dance
- Week 9 (Quarterfinals): One unlearned dance & dance relay
- Week 10 (Semifinals): One unlearned dance & one repeat dance
- Week 11 (Finale): Judges' choice, instant dance & freestyle

Dancing with the Stars (season 34) - Dance chart
Couple	Week																
Couple	1	2	3	4	5	6	7		8		9		10		11		
Robert & Witney	Jive	Tango	Salsa	Cha-cha-cha	Contemp.	Jazz	Argentine tango	Hustle & Lindy Hop; Marathon	Paso doble	Team Freestyle	Foxtrot	Jive	Jive	Viennese waltz	Quickstep	Cha-cha-cha	Freestyle
Alix & Val	Cha-cha-cha	Jive	Quickstep	Viennese waltz	Contemp.	Jazz	Tango	Hustle & Lindy Hop; Marathon	Paso doble	Team Freestyle	Foxtrot	Jive	Argentine tango	Viennese waltz	Samba	Cha-cha-cha	Freestyle
Jordan & Ezra	Salsa	Jive	Tango	Quickstep	Viennese waltz	Rumba	Contemp.	Hustle & Lindy Hop; Marathon	Jazz	Team Freestyle	Cha-cha-cha	Quickstep	Jive	Argentine tango	Paso doble	Tango	Freestyle
Dylan & Daniella	Cha-cha-cha	Samba	Foxtrot	Quickstep	Contemp.	Rumba	Viennese waltz	Hustle & Lindy Hop; Marathon	Jive	Team Freestyle	Argentine tango	Viennese waltz	Tango	Cha-cha-cha	Paso doble	Foxtrot	Freestyle
Elaine & Alan	Cha-cha-cha	Jive	Tango	Quickstep	Foxtrot	Contemp.	Argentine tango	Hustle & Lindy Hop; Marathon	Viennese waltz	Team Freestyle	Salsa	Quickstep	Foxtrot	Paso doble	Rumba	Quickstep	Freestyle
Whitney & Mark	Tango	Cha-cha-cha	Samba	Foxtrot	Contemp.	Quickstep	Jazz	Hustle & Lindy Hop; Marathon	Paso doble	Team Freestyle	Argentine tango	Immunity	Cha-cha-cha	Viennese waltz			
Andy & Emma	Cha-cha-cha	Tango	Foxtrot	Viennese waltz	Salsa	Jazz	Paso doble	Hustle & Lindy Hop; Marathon	Contemp.	Team Freestyle	Quickstep	Viennese waltz					
Danielle & Pasha	Tango	Cha-cha-cha	Foxtrot	Quickstep	Jive	Argentine tango	Viennese waltz	Hustle & Lindy Hop; Marathon	Contemp.	Team Freestyle							
Jen & Jan	Salsa	Quickstep	Cha-cha-cha	Jazz	Viennese waltz	Foxtrot	Contemp.	Hustle & Lindy Hop; Marathon									
Scott & Rylee	Tango	Cha-cha-cha	Jazz	Salsa	Foxtrot	Contemp.											
Hilaria & Gleb	Cha-cha-cha	Tango	Samba	Quickstep													
Lauren & Brandon	Tango	Foxtrot	Cha-cha-cha														
Corey & Jenna	Tango	Cha-cha-cha															
Baron & Britt	Cha-cha-cha	Samba															

== Reception ==
Season thirty-four became the program's most-watched in several years. "TikTok Night" marked the first time in twenty years that Dancing with the Stars saw an increase in viewership for two consecutive weeks since its premiere episode. With "Wicked Night", the series became the first American fall television program in at least 34 years to increase in viewers for five weeks after its premiere episode.

"Prince Night" became the show's most-watched semifinals episode in seven years. The season finale, which crowned Robert Irwin and Witney Carson as champions, became the show's highest-rated finale since Laurie Hernandez and Val Chmerkovskiy won in season twenty-three. It also earned the program's strongest finale demo number since Irwin's older sister, Bindi, won with Derek Hough in season twenty-one.

Season thirty-four ended the 2025–26 schedule as the twelfth most-watched series across network television, and the twenty-fourth most-watched show overall, with an average of 9.8 million viewers. At the 78th Primetime Emmy Awards, season thirty-four became Dancing with the Stars' first installment in ten years to earn a nomination for Outstanding Reality Competition Program.
