= Mayci Neeley =

American television personality (born 1995)

- Born: February 23, 1995 (age 31)
- Education: Brigham Young University
- Occupations: Television personality; influencer; entrepreneur
- Years active: 2022–present
- Spouse: Jacob Neeley (m. 2018)
- Children: 3

Instagram information
- Page: Mayci Neeley
- Followers: 1.7 million

TikTok information
- Page: Mayci Neeley
- Followers: 2.9 million
- Last updated: June 8, 2026

Mayci Neeley (née Jones; born February 23, 1995) is an American television personality and influencer. She is best known as a cast member of the Hulu reality television series The Secret Lives of Mormon Wives, in which she has starred since 2024.

== Early life ==
Neeley was raised in Coto de Caza, California, the youngest of four children. In 2013, she was recruited to play tennis at Brigham Young University (BYU), where she studied communications and media studies.

== Career ==
Neeley worked as a social media operations specialist at Goldman Sachs and a marketing manager at New U Life, before quitting her job to pursue a career as a content creator in 2022. In 2024, she joined the cast of the Hulu reality television series The Secret Lives of Mormon Wives. That year, she also co-founded Babymama, a vitamin company, with Kenton Engel.

Neeley has had numerous 'viral' moment on social media. Most notably, her confession inbox which is published on her Instagram story. It launched her social media following before she joined The Secret Lives of Mormon Wives. She has remained a core cast member of the show through all 5 seasons. Neeley makes a guest appearance in Season 1 of the spinoff The Secret Lives of Mormon Wives: Orange County (released November 2026), which stars her older sister, McCall DaPron.

In October 2025, she published a memoir titled Told You So, published by Simon & Schuster. The book covers Neeley's experiences with domestic abuse, grief of her late college boyfriend, Arik Mack, motherhood and the behind-the-scenes dynamics of the group dubbed "MomTok", which the reality show, The Secret Lives of Mormon Wives follows. The book subsequently became a New York Times Bestseller.

=== Television Appearances ===
Year	Title	Notes
2024-present	The Secret Lives of Mormon Wives	Main cast, seasons 1-5
2025	Vanderpump Villa	Guest appearance; Season 2 Episode 3: "MomToks and Mormons, Oh My!" and Season 2 Episode 4: "Fireworks and Falling Apart
2026	The Secret Lives of Mormon Wives: Orange County	Guest appearance, Season 1

== Personal life ==
Neeley grew up in the Church of Jesus Christ of Latter-day Saints. She married Jacob Neeley in 2018. They have two children. She also has a son from a prior relationship with her late college boyfriend, Arik Mack.

== Bibliography ==
- Neeley, Mayci (2025). Told You So (1 ed.). Simon & Schuster. ISBN 978-1668099926.
