= Whitney Leavitt =

American media personality (born 1993)

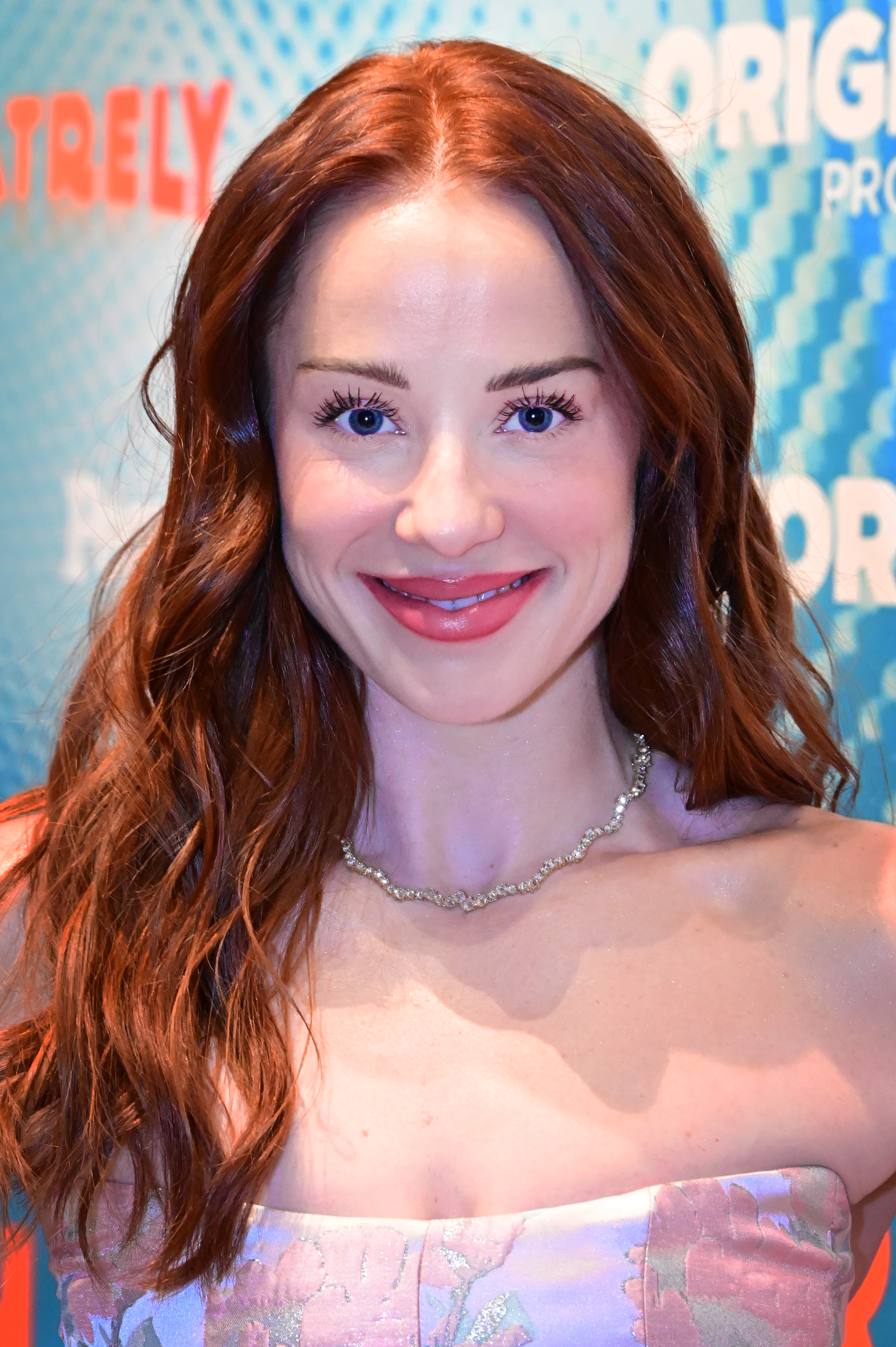
- Leavitt in 2026
- Born: Whitney Marie Ellis; May 12, 1993 (age 33); American Fork, Utah, U.S.
- Education: Brigham Young University (BFA)
- Occupations: Media personality; actress
- Years active: 2020–present
- Spouse: Conner Leavitt (m. 2016)
- Children: 3

Instagram information
- Page: whitleavitt
- Followers: 2 million

TikTok information
- Page: Whitney Leavitt
- Followers: 3.4 million
- Last updated: March 17, 2026

Whitney Marie Leavitt (née Ellis; born May 12, 1993) is an American media personality and actress. She gained prominence through her appearances on the Hulu reality television series The Secret Lives of Mormon Wives (2024–2026) and the ABC competition series Dancing with the Stars.

Leavitt made her Broadway debut playing Roxie Hart in the musical Chicago (2026). Her run grossed over $8 million, and earned the highest weekly box office sales in the show's 29-year history.

== Early life ==
Whitney Marie Ellis was born on May 12, 1993, in American Fork, Utah. She was raised Mormon with four biological siblings; her parents, Brady and Stephanie Ellis, additionally fostered at least a half-dozen other children. Throughout grade school, she was a competitive dancer and trained at the rival studio of professional dancer Witney Carson.

In 2018, Ellis graduated from Brigham Young University with a bachelor's degree in fine arts with an emphasis on dance. She then backpacked across Europe for two months and lived in Uganda for four months.

== Career ==
Leavitt began creating content on the social media platform TikTok in March 2020, in the midst of the COVID-19 pandemic. She quickly joined a community of Utah-based influencers known as "MomTok". In December 2021, Leavitt received significant backlash after she filmed herself dancing while her newborn son was in the neonatal intensive care unit (NICU) recovering from respiratory syncytial virus (RSV) and pneumonia.

In 2024, Leavitt appeared as a main cast member of the Hulu reality television series The Secret Lives of Mormon Wives. She adopted a villainous persona throughout the series, which established her as a breakout star according to Vulture. On June 30, 2025, during the show's second reunion special, host Nick Viall revealed that Leavitt was cast in the thirty-fourth season of the ABC reality competition series Dancing with the Stars. She was paired with professional dancer Mark Ballas, and was the subject of intense criticism from audience viewers on social media. Despite receiving the highest cumulative points in the season at the time, Leavitt and Ballas were eliminated during the semifinals on November 18, 2025, finishing in sixth place.

Following their elimination, Leavitt and Ballas discussed their experience on Dancing with the Stars with Alex Cooper on her podcast Call Her Daddy, through the cooperation of ABC. They also performed their jazz-based freestyle routine to Frank Sinatra's "My Way", which received widespread acclaim. Shortly after the episode was aired, Leavitt announced that she would be making her Broadway debut as Roxie Hart in the musical Chicago at the Ambassador Theatre during a six-week run in 2026. Her run later received a two-week extension due to overwhelming demand. Between March 8 and March 15, 2026, Leavitt's performance raked in $1,457,930.77, the highest weekly box office sales in the show's 29-year history.

During her final Chicago performance on May 3, 2026, Leavitt announced her departure from The Secret Lives of Mormon Wives at the end of Season 5. She will make her film acting debut alongside Jesse Kove in the holiday romantic comedy film All For Love, which she will also executive produce. In December, she will return to Broadway as Sandra Dee in the jukebox musical Just In Time for a six-week run. Leavitt will compete on the sixth season of the Peacock reality competition series The Traitors in early 2027. She will also star and executive produce an untitled reality series centered on her life for Hulu.

== Personal life ==
While serving a mission with the Church of Jesus Christ of Latter-day Saints in Georgia, Ellis became close to the family of technical analyst Conner Leavitt. She officially met him in 2015 when they attended a double date as wingmen for their friends, who later bailed on their plans. They married on August 19, 2016, at the Provo Utah Rock Canyon Temple. They have three children together and reside in St. George, Utah. The Leavitts renewed their vows at the Little White Wedding Chapel in Las Vegas to celebrate their tenth wedding anniversary.

== Filmography ==
=== Film ===
Key
| † | Denotes films that have not yet been released |

| Year | Title | Role | Director(s) | Notes |
|---|---|---|---|---|
| 2023 | An Uncharted Desire | Noori | Abhishek Patel | Short film |
| 2024 | What to Expect When You're Not Expecting | London | Jackson Tropp | Short film |
| 2026 | All For Love † | Winona | Jake Helgren | Feature film debut |

=== Television ===
Key
| † | Denotes television productions that have not yet been released |

| Year | Title | Role | Notes | Ref. |
|---|---|---|---|---|
| 2024–2026 | The Secret Lives of Mormon Wives | Herself | Main role | |
| 2025 | Dancing with the Stars | Herself | Season 34 semi-finalist | |
| 2025 | Vanderpump Villa | Herself | Episodes: "MomToks and Mormons, Oh My!" and "Fireworks and Falling Apart" | |
| 2026 | The Secret Lives of Mormon Wives: Orange County | Herself | Episode: "The Book of Ashleigh Madison" | |
| 2027 | The Traitors † | Herself | Season 6 contestant | |

=== Theater ===
| Year | Production | Role(s) | Venue | Refs. |
|---|---|---|---|---|
| 2026 | Chicago | Roxie Hart | Ambassador Theatre | |
| 2026 | Just in Time | Sandra Dee | Circle in the Square Theatre | |
