= Taylor Frankie Paul =

American reality television personality (born 1994)

- Born: May 23, 1994 (age 32); Pueblo, Colorado, U.S.
- Children: 3

Instagram information
- Page: Taylor Paul
- Genres: Personal life updates, Vlogs
- Followers: 2.5 million

TikTok information
- Page: Taylor Paul
- Years active: 2019-present
- Genres: Personal life updates, Vlogs
- Followers: 6.1 million
- Last updated: November 16, 2026

Taylor Frankie Paul (née Wilkinson; born May 23, 1994) is an American reality television personality and social media influencer. She was a cast member of the Hulu series The Secret Lives of Mormon Wives.

== Life and Career ==
=== Early Life ===
Taylor Frankie Paul was raised in Pueblo, Colorado, and moved to Utah with her mother and step-father at the age of 16. During this time, she attended the Church of Jesus Christ of Latter-day Saints (LDS Church).

=== Personal Life ===
In 2016, Taylor Frankie Paul married Tate Paul and they had two children, but Tate Paul divorced her in early 2022 after Taylor Frankie Paul broke the rules of their "soft-swinging" relationship and fell in love with one of their swinging partners. Following the divorce, Taylor experienced an episode of depression, which caused her to lose weight. Around this time, she went viral for openly revealing that she and her ex-husband had been "soft-swinging" with other couples. According to writers from various news agencies, the swingers were Mormon couples, referring to members of the LDS Church. By August 2022, Taylor started dating Dakota Mortensen, with whom she later had a third child (a son) in 2024. In August 2023, Taylor pleaded guilty to aggravated assault following an incident with Mortensen. She started seeing a therapist in 2024.

Reporting by TMZ released footage of a domestic violence incident in 2023 where Taylor is filmed throwing chairs at Mortenson and accidentally hitting her daughter with one. It was revealed that Taylor had been investigated by law enforcement at least three times previously for domestic violence allegations in 2023 and 2024.

Reportedly, the most recent domestic violence incident occurred in February 2026, resulting in a new police investigation being conducted against her. They ultimately declined to press charges; additionally, Mortensen sought and was granted temporary sole custody of their son by a judge. A follow up hearing was set to occur on April 30, 2026. Due to the ongoing controversy, filming for The Secret Lives of Mormon Wives was paused for a month before restarting without Taylor or Dakota Mortensen. On April 30, 2026, Taylor and Dakota were ordered to stay 100 feet away from each other for the next three years; it was revealed that 11 fights between the pair were under review; In an unrelated revelation, it was disclosed that Taylor had experienced several miscarriages which she believed influenced her behavior toward Mortenson.

Taylor announced that she had chosen to leave the LDS Church in late April, 2026.

On June 1, 2026, the mandatory supervision order against Taylor was officially lifted. On July 9, 2026, she was announced that she was returning to The Secret Lives of Mormon Wives in a limited capacity.

On July 15, 2026, Taylor reached out to Utah's Department of Children and Family Services, who were seeking court protection of her kids. On August 7, 2026, it was revealed that Taylor’s criminal probation was reduced from a felony to a Class A misdemeanor by a judge.

On August 14, 2026, she was granted a continued stalking injunction against Cru Eaton, a friend of Mortenson.

In September 2026, it was reported that Taylor had allegedly failed drug tests and had her parenting time reduced to 8 hours as a result.

=== Career ===
In 2024, Hulu launched the reality television series The Secret Lives of Mormon Wives co-starring Paul and touching on "soft swinging" and her arrest. Following its debut, she was coined a "breakout star" and "the MVP" of season 1 with Hansika Khokhar of Collider writing: "Taylor’s presence was undeniable. She gave what needed to be given. She was raw, she was unpredictable, and she gave zero filtered responses. She managed to turn what could’ve been a short-lived TikTok infamy into long-form storytelling gold... And fans noticed. Reddit threads, TikTok recaps, Instagram lives dissecting every frame; Paul was the center of it all. Whether you loved her, hated her, or fluctuated between the two within the same episode, she ended up winning Season 1." In June 2025, Paul was listed on TIME Magazine's Top 100 Creators of 2025.

In March 2026, Paul was scheduled to be the Bachelorette for its 22nd season and had completed filming. The season was cancelled by ABC following reports of domestic violence by TMZ. As a result of Taylor's actions, filming for The Secret Lives of Mormon Wives was paused for a month before restarting without Taylor or Dakota Mortensen.

On July 9, 2026, it was announced that she was returning to The Secret Lives of Mormon Wives in a limited capacity. Taylor announced in September 2026 that she had permanently left The Secret Lives of Mormon Wives. In November 2026, Jeff Jenkins stated that they wanted to get her back on the show.

=== Television Appearances ===
Year	Title	Notes
2024-2026	The Secret Lives of Mormon Wives	Main cast (seasons 1-5); departed during season 5
2025	Vanderpump Villa	Guest appearance; Season 2 Episode 3: "MomToks and Mormons, Oh My!" and Season 2 Episode 4: "Fireworks and Falling Apart"
