= The Secret Lives of Mormon Wives =

American reality television series (2024–present)

- Genre: Reality television
- Starring: Jen Affleck; Jessi Draper; Demi Engemann; Whitney Leavitt; Mikayla Matthews; Mayci Neeley; Taylor Frankie Paul; Layla Taylor; Miranda Hope
- Opening theme: "Secret Temptation" by ITG Studios
- Country of origin: United States
- Original language: English
- No. of seasons: 5
- No. of episodes: 45

Production
- Executive producers: Jeff Jenkins; Russell Jay-Staglik; Andrea Metz; Brandon Beck; Eric Monsky; Ross Weintraub; Reinout Oerlemans; Lisa Filipelli; Danielle Pistotnik; Georgia Berger; Elise Chung
- Camera setup: Multiple
- Running time: 39–61 minutes
- Production companies: Jeff Jenkins Productions; Select Entertainment; Walt Disney Television Alternative

Original release
- Network: Hulu
- Release: September 6, 2024 – present

Related
- The Secret Lives of Mormon Wives: Orange County

The Secret Lives of Mormon Wives (also abbreviated SLOMW: Utah) is an American reality television series that premiered on September 6, 2024, on Hulu. The series follows a group of Utah-based TikTok influencers, known as "MomTok", as they navigate their personal and professional lives.

== Overview ==
In 2022, Utah influencer Taylor Frankie Paul went viral for revealing that she and her husband had been "soft-swinging" with other couples. The series begins months later as Taylor and her group of influencer friends, dubbed "MomTok", deal with the fallout of the scandal. The show then continues to follow the daily lives of the cast members, including their attendance at influencer events for their own brands and other they represent. Throughout the show, there are 'confessional' segments which give greater insight into the inner thoughts of each cast members in relations to the events unfolding on screen. Over time, the original group dubbed "MomTok" evolves as cast members leave for periods of time or join the show.

== Production ==
=== Development ===
Several months after Paul's "soft-swinging" scandal, the group was approached to star in a reality television series commissioned by Hulu named The Secret Lives of Mormon Wives. In February 2023, Paul was arrested for domestic violence after an argument with her boyfriend, Dakota Mortensen; the incident was featured in the first episode of the series. The series' title sequence was filmed at the Provo Utah Temple. On October 3, 2024, the series was picked up for an additional 20 episodes. Production on the second season began in October 2024. On November 25, 2025, it was announced that the series had been renewed for a fourth season.

In March 2026, filming of the show's fifth season was paused due to an ongoing investigation of another domestic violence allegation against Paul. In March 2026, video footage of the 2023 domestic violence incident was released, showing Paul throwing metal chairs during an altercation with her then-boyfriend, Dakota Mortensen. The footage also appears to show her five-year-old child being struck and crying during the incident.

Later the following month, Hulu announced that the series would resume production at an unspecified date. On May 2026, the fifth season was confirmed to be reduced to five episodes and the cast returned to film confessionals, while full production was rumored to resume directly with the sixth season. Taylor Frankie Paul later returned to the show in a limited capacity, filming intros and opening credits for the fifth season.

On August 6, 2026, the show was renewed for an additional 20 episodes. The same month, Layla Taylor confirmed that production on the show had resume with the filming of the sixth season.

On April 22, 2026, Hulu officially announced the creation of a spinoff series, The Secret Lives of Mormon Wives: Orange County. This was announced at the Hulu: Get Real House event stating the show is to be produced by Jeff Jenkins Productions.

=== Casting ===
On May 2026, Whitney Leavitt announced that she would not be returning for another season if the show is renewed.

On September 2026, it was confirmed that Taylor Frankie Paul was returning for the show's sixth season. Following this announcement, Mikayla Matthews announced her departure from the show later the same month. Prior to her departure, Matthews had already filmed part of the season but stopped participating after learning that Paul would be coming back during the season. Following Matthews's public reaction on social media, Paul reacted by announcing her own departure, stating, "I don’t desire to move forward like this. I originally was willing to be removed to let them all continue on with less stress and I’m back to that point." Two months later, show's producer Jeff Jenkins stated that he's hopeful that she will change her mind.

== Cast ==
Timeline of the cast
Cast member	Seasons				
Cast member	1	2	3	4	5
Jen Affleck	Main	Main	Main	Main	Main
Jessi Draper	Main	Main	Main	Main	Main
Demi Engemann	Main	Main	Main	Recurring	
Whitney Leavitt	Main	Main	Main	Main	Main
Mikayla Matthews	Main	Main	Main	Main	Main
Mayci Neeley	Main	Main	Main	Main	Main
Taylor Frankie Paul	Main	Main	Main	Main	Main
Layla Taylor	Main	Main	Main	Main	Main
Miranda Hope		Main	Main	Main	Main

== Episodes ==
=== Series overview ===
Season	Episodes	Originally released	
Season	Episodes	First released	Last released
1	8	September 6, 2024	
2	11	May 15, 2025	July 1, 2025
3	11	November 13, 2025	December 4, 2025
4	10	March 12, 2026	
5	5	September 10, 2026	

=== Season 1 (2024) ===
No. overall	No. in season	Title	Original release date
1	1	"The First Book of Taylor"	September 6, 2024
In the wake of the "soft-swinging" scandal, Taylor has distanced herself from the MomTok group. Whitney, dealing with her own marital scandal, returns to Utah. Taylor is arrested after a drunken altercation with her new boyfriend, Dakota.
2	2	"The Book of Belonging"	September 6, 2024
One year after Taylor's arrest, she is pregnant with Dakota's baby, though her parents disapprove of the relationship. Whitney, believing her friendship with Taylor is one-sided, does not attend Taylor's baby shower.
3	3	"The Book of Saints & Sinners"	September 6, 2024
After Jen's husband Zac's graduation party, a rift forms between the "saints" and "sinners" of the group. Jen uninvites the "sinners"—Taylor, Demi, Jessi, and Layla—from her baby blessing. Whitney gives Demi a poorly-received joke gift about her sex life.
4	4	"The Book of Truth"	September 6, 2024
The group rents a penthouse for Mayci's birthday. Tensions rise after the women read anonymous questions to each other via a "truth box". Taylor confronts Whitney about missing her baby shower, while Demi accuses Whitney of being two-faced.
5	5	"The Book of Broken Vows"	September 6, 2024
Whitney leaves the group chat, effectively ending her relationship with the other members of MomTok. She later makes an appearance at Layla's divorce party, but leaves after a confrontation with Jessi. Mayci confronts Dakota about his treatment of Taylor.
6	6	"The First Book of Sin"	September 6, 2024
The group travels to Las Vegas for a girls' trip. Dakota and Zac also tag along, much to the dismay of the other women, who believe them to be controlling partners. Jessi surprises the women with Chippendales tickets and backstage passes, sparking a major argument between Jen and Zac.
7	7	"The Book of Trust"	September 6, 2024
Jen, upset about her fight with Zac, leaves Las Vegas. After days of radio silence, she reassures the women that all is well in her marriage, but the women are skeptical. After receiving an anonymous confession, Mayci tells Taylor that Dakota might have cheated on her earlier in their relationship.
8	8	"The Book of Rumors"	September 6, 2024
Taylor confronts Dakota about the cheating rumors, and Dakota confronts Mayci about interfering in his relationship. Whitney severs her last ties with the group by skipping Mayci's brand launch. Taylor gives birth to her and Dakota's son, Ever. Jen leaves MomTok.

=== Season 2 (2025) ===
No. overall	No. in season	Title	Original release date
9	1	"The Book of Revelations"	May 15, 2025
Miranda, an ex-member of MomTok and Taylor's former best friend, is back in town hoping to reconnect with the group, but the others are hesitant. Miranda denies being involved in the swinging scandal beyond kissing, contrary to Taylor's claims. Jen rejoins MomTok amid her marital difficulties, though Zac is determined to mend their relationship. Taylor is devastated when the cheating rumors about Dakota are confirmed.
10	2	"The Book of Accountability"	May 15, 2025
Zac confronts Demi and Jessi about their treatment of Jen and his marriage. Taylor's parents, pushing Taylor to reconcile with Dakota, invite him to their house for a barbecue. Jen and Zac meet with Demi and Jessi in an attempt to settle their differences. Jessi hosts a Halloween party that culminates in an argument between Taylor, Dakota, and Miranda's ex-husband, Chase.
11	3	"The Book of Retribution"	May 15, 2025
The Halloween party, which has descended into chaos, is thrown into further disarray when Demi and Jessi orchestrate a Chippendales routine by their husbands in front of Jen and Zac. Mikayla opens up about her chronic illness and traumatic childhood. Whitney gives birth to her son. Miranda comes clean about her involvement in the swinging scandal, and she and Taylor take the first steps to heal their friendship.
12	4	"The Book of Taboos"	May 15, 2025
Demi hosts a "Break the Taboo" party with a professional sex therapist. Mayci hosts a dinner party to announce her book deal. A confession box causes drama when Jen is accused of being fake. Demi appears jealous and unsupportive of Mayci. Whitney invites everyone to her baby shower.
13	5	"The Book of Divisions"	May 15, 2025
Jessi and Jen fall out over the Chippendales dance at the Halloween party, while Mikayla and Whitney argue over Whitney's previous behavior. Taylor officially breaks up with Dakota. Taylor, Mayci, Miranda and Jen attend Whitney's baby shower, while Jessi and Jordon host Mikayla, Demi, Layla, and their husbands for dinner. Jessi admits to swinging in her previous relationship.
14	6	"The Book of Redemption"	May 15, 2025
The women take a trip to Scottsdale to support Mayci's hosting gig alongside Joey Fatone of NSYNC at the Dinks for a Difference Celebrity Pickleball Match; Jen, suffering from pre-natal depression, does not attend. Mikayla accuses Whitney of being a bad friend. More is revealed about Demi's time in the Vanderpump Villa. It is revealed Demi was willing to cut out Jessi out of the show for more money.
15	7	"The Book of Gratitude"	May 15, 2025
Demi and Bret hash out Bret's cheating rumors. Zac tells Whitney and Conner that Demi sent him and Jen a cease and desist. Dakota decides to give Taylor an ultimatum. Layla and her boyfriend host a Friendsgiving dinner. The boyfriends and husbands encourage Taylor to give herself grace.
16	8	"The Book of Betrayal"	May 15, 2025
Taylor, having presented at the 58th Annual Country Music Association Awards, publicly calls out the other women for not supporting her, causing a split in the group. Mayci goes through IVF treatments and becomes pregnant. At a photoshoot in New York, Layla shows Taylor messages Demi has written about her. At a Saints and Sinners party, Demi and Taylor fight about the CMA Awards, and it is revealed that Demi had previously disparaged Jessi's business. Demi conspires to kick Taylor out of MomTok and become the group's new leader.
17	9	"The Book of Reckoning"	May 15, 2025
The women take a trip to New Orleans, but Jen and Taylor do not attend. Jen sends a video to the women explaining her mental health crisis and apologizes for her previous behavior. A game of pregnancy roulette ends with heartbreak for Demi amid her fertility issues, while Mayci and Mikayla are both revealed to be pregnant. Demi and Jessi argue over Demi's comments on Jessi's business. Demi gives the women an ultimatum: if Taylor stays in MomTok, she is out.
18	10	"The Book of Salvation"	May 15, 2025
Layla tells Taylor about Demi's plan to oust her from the group. The women meet to vote on who remains in the group. Demi's ultimatum backfires and she leaves MomTok, while Whitney is voted back in. Layla meets with Marciano to find out what happened at Vanderpump Villa, and he tells her that he slept with Jessi.
19	11	"The Secret Lives of Mormon Wives Reunion Special"	July 1, 2025
All the women, apart from Demi, gather for a reunion special hosted by Nick Viall. Jen and Zac play a recorded phone call with Demi where she instructed Jen on what to say about Vanderpump Villa, claiming she is a victim. Nick reveals that both Jen and Whitney have been selected for Dancing with the Stars.

=== Season 3 (2025) ===
No. overall	No. in season	Title	Original release date
20	1	"The Book of Doubt"	November 13, 2025
Taylor and Jen are on mental health breaks from MomTok, while Demi and Whitney have distanced themselves from the group entirely. Jessi's affair with Vanderpump Villa cast member Marciano Brunette comes to light, and she and Jordan deal with the fallout. Layla invites Miranda's ex-husband, Chase, to her 24th party, upsetting Mikayla and Mayci. Jordan is frustrated with Jessi's involvement in the argument and leaves Layla's party early.
21	2	"The Book of Fidelity"	November 13, 2025
Jessi and Jordan agree to a 90-day separation. In a confessional, Jessi claims that Jordan has been emotionally abusive. Taylor returns from her therapy retreat and discusses a custody agreement for their son with Dakota. Tensions are high at Mikayla's 25th birthday party, as Jessi and Jordan see each other for the first time since their separation, and Layla brings an uninvited plus-one. Jen and Zac move back to Utah in preparation for Jen's birth. Mayci and Mikayla take a road trip to Beaver, Utah, to meet Marciano and learn the truth about his affair with Jessi.
22	3	"The Book of Demi"	November 13, 2025
After talking with Marciano, Mayci and Mikayla learn that Demi may have encouraged him to expose the affair. Demi makes an unexpected appearance at an influencer event, where she gets into a fight with Layla and threatens to expose Jessi on live. The women take a girls' trip to St. George, Utah, and discuss the future of MomTok. Jessi invites Marciano to come to St. George so they can take a lie detector test and discuss the test results at dinner with the other women.
23	4	"The Book of Deceit"	November 13, 2025
Jordan is upset about Jessi inviting Marciano to dinner. Jessi opens up to the girls about her dynamic with Jordan, while Jordan opens up to DadTok about the lie detector test and his feelings of betrayal, creating tension between MomTok and DadTok. Jen reunites with MomTok at an influencer event, where she and Jessi resolve their issues and agree to move forward. Layla opens up about her hair loss and decides to see a Black stylist rather than continue getting extensions at Jessi's salon.
24	5	"The Book of Resurrection"	November 13, 2025
25	6	"The Book of Confrontation"	November 13, 2025
26	7	"The Book of Broken Hearts"	November 13, 2025
27	8	"The Book of Awakening"	November 13, 2025
28	9	"The Book of Judgement"	November 13, 2025
29	10	"The Book of Enlightenment"	November 13, 2025
30	11	"Season 3 Reunion Special"	December 4, 2025
The women gather for a reunion special hosted by Stassi Schroeder.

=== Season 4 (2026) ===
No. overall	No. in season	Title	Original release date
31	1	"The Book of Taking Flight"	March 12, 2026
32	2	"The Book of Secrets"	March 12, 2026
33	3	"The Book of True Colors"	March 12, 2026
34	4	"The Book of Exodus"	March 12, 2026
35	5	"The Book of Power and Pain"	March 12, 2026
36	6	"The Book of Conceit"	March 12, 2026
37	7	"The Book of Fragile Egos"	March 12, 2026
38	8	"The Book of Unearthing"	March 12, 2026
39	9	"The Book of Coveting"	March 12, 2026
40	10	"The Book of Thorns and Roses"	March 12, 2026

=== Season 5 (2026) ===
No. overall	No. in season	Title	Original release date
41	1	"The Book of More Men"	September 10, 2026
42	2	"The Book of Dead Roses"	September 10, 2026
43	3	"The Book of Broadway"	September 10, 2026
44	4	"The Book of Friendship"	September 10, 2026
45	5	"The Book of Destruction"	September 10, 2026

== Release ==
First season release poster.

The series' premiere date was officially announced on July 26, 2024. On August 14, 2024, the first trailer and official cast photos were released. The Secret Lives of Mormon Wives was released on September 6, 2024, on Hulu in the United States. Internationally, the show was made available to stream simultaneously on Disney+'s Star hub. The first season also aired on ABC, starting January 27, 2025.

The second season was released on May 15, 2025. A reunion special, hosted by Nick Viall, was released on July 1, 2025. The third season was released on November 13, 2025. Internationally, it was the first season released under Disney+'s Hulu hub following the closure of the Star hub, except in Japan. A reunion special, hosted by Stassi Schroeder, was released on December 4, 2025.

The fourth season was released on March 12, 2026. The fifth season was released on September 10, 2026.

== Reception ==
=== Audience viewership ===
Upon its release, the series became Hulu's most-watched unscripted season premiere of 2024.

=== Critical response ===
Monica Hesse of The Washington Post wrote, "The Secret Lives of Mormon Wives is not a good show. If I hadn't been watching for work, I would have given up after two episodes. But it is a good reminder that the stories that social media tells on a daily basis are often incomplete."

David Oliver of USA Today wrote, "It's about friendship, faith, backstabbing, gaslighting, infidelity and vacation – a typical season of Real Housewives. Perhaps that's why the show works so well. It's not reinventing the reality-TV wheel. It's just styling it with a different (very bingeable) bow, and offering a cautionary tale for viewers."

Samantha Nungesser of Decider called the series "the next best reality show on streaming" and wrote, "The Secret Lives of Mormon Wives lives up to its reputation, keeping viewers fully hooked from start to finish."

Kevin Fallon of The Daily Beast stated, "...I just wrote a litany of reasons why this show is a failure. And yet I've become devout. It's awful, but I want more. I don’t know whether MomTok will survive this travesty. But Secret Lives certainly will."

Sarah Stiefvater of PureWow called the series "must-see TV" and wrote, "With eight, 40-ish-minute episodes, The Secret Lives of Mormon Wives is reality TV gold and I cannot wait for the second season...."

Yonni Uribe of SLUG Magazine wrote, "Despite all of the questions and red flags this show raised for me during my initial viewing, it's always fun to sit back and watch drama that isn't your own. Especially when it's excellently produced. I can't wait to glue my eyes to the next trainwreck of a second season and see what the future has in store for MomTok."

=== LDS Church response ===
On August 16, 2024, ahead of the series' release, the Church of Jesus Christ of Latter-day Saints (LDS Church) released the following statement on their website:

The Church of Jesus Christ of Latter-day Saints, like other prominent global faith communities, often finds itself the focus of the attention of the entertainment industry. Some portrayals are fair and accurate, but others resort to stereotypes or gross misrepresentations that are in poor taste and have real-life consequences for people of faith. While this is not new, a number of recent productions depict lifestyles and practices blatantly inconsistent with the teachings of the Church.

They also spoke to the fascination that viewers have with the LDS Church, stating:

We understand the fascination some in the media have with the Church, but regret that portrayals often rely on sensationalism and inaccuracies that do not fairly and fully reflect the lives of our Church members or the sacred beliefs that they hold dear.

A Change.org petition urging Hulu to cancel the series was created prior to the series' premiere.

Along with the LDS Church, several leaders within the faith have spoken against the nature of the show and its virality, specifically what it means for the public perception of its followers. Jennifer Finlayson-Fife, a sex therapist and marriage counselor, stated that the show could "feed the fantasies" of outsiders who believe LDS Church members do not believe in chastity and fidelity.

In an opinion piece for the Deseret News, which is owned by the LDS Church, editor Sarah Jane Weaver stated, "The Secret Lives of Mormon Wives is not a representation of me or my friends or my daughters or their friends or of the women I have met across the globe. It simply is not. My invitation and plea to any media writing about these women is simple. There are millions of Latter-day Saint women who live their faith differently than these outliers being promoted online. They are smart, educated, funny and content. Find them, talk to them and tell their stories."

Dancer and businesswoman Lindsay Arnold, a member of the LDS Church, stated, "I think there's a lot of people out there mad about the show, upset about it. I honestly really don't feel any of those things. I watched. I was entertained."

=== Lawsuit ===
On November 13, 2026, Dakota Mortensen, Taylor Frankie Paul's ex, sued Hulu and Jeff Jenkins Productions, claiming they staged scenes and faked storylines to make him appear as a cheater and abuser.

== Spin-offs ==
A spin-off, titled The Secret Lives of Mormon Wives: Orange County, was released on November 12, 2026 on Hulu. The cast includes Jen Affleck from the original show, and influencers Bobbi Althoff, Aspyn Ovard, Avery Woods, McCall DaPron, Madison Bontempo, Salomé Andrea, Ashleigh Pease and Jordan McClanahan. McCanahan is replacing the previously announced cast member Chandler Higginson. In connection to the flagship series, it is notable that McCall DaPron is the older sister of original cast member Mayci Neeley.

The Secret Lives of Mormon Wives: Orange County's first season consists of 8 episodes, which were released in one batch on Hulu (and Disney+ internationally) on November 12, 2026. The series begins in Utah and then shifts to Orange County, Southern California. In this season, the focus shifts from strictly practicing members of the Church of Latter-Day Saints to featuring mothers with varying connections to the LDS Church.

Another series focusing on Whitney Leavitt and her family was ordered by Hulu in November 2026.

== Awards and nominations ==
Award	Year	Category	Result	Ref.
Astra TV Awards	2025	Best Reality Series	Nominated	
Primetime Emmy Awards	2025	Outstanding Unstructured Reality Program	Nominated	

== Bibliography ==
- Neeley, Mayci (October 7, 2025). Told You So. Simon and Schuster. ISBN 978-1-6680-9994-0.
