= List of Dancing with the Stars (American TV series) competitors =

Dancing with the Stars is an American reality television show in which celebrity contestants and professional dance partners compete to be the best dancers, as determined by the show's judges and public voting. The series first broadcast in 2005, and thirty-four complete seasons have aired. During each season, competitors are progressively eliminated on the basis of public voting and scores received from the judges until only a few contestants remain. These finalists participate in a finale, from which a winner is determined. Celebrities appearing on Dancing with the Stars include "actors, singers, comedians, musicians, entrepreneurs, athletes, reality stars, journalists, TV presenters, internet personalities, newsmakers, and where-are-they-now personalities".

As of season 35, 424 celebrities have competed. Eleven of those withdrew from the competition: Sara Evans of season 3 left the show to "give her family full attention" after filing for divorce; Misty May-Treanor of season 7 was forced to pull out after an ankle injury; Tom DeLay of season 9 reportedly withdrew "due to stress fractures in both of his feet"; Dorothy Hamill of season 16 withdrew due to a previous injury that was unrelated to the competition; Billy Dee Williams of season 18 quit due to a back injury; Kim Zolciak-Biermann of season 21 was forced to withdraw after suffering a mini-stroke, which although cleared her to dance, prevented her from flying to California from Atlanta; Tamar Braxton, also of season twenty-one, withdrew due to pulmonary embolisms in her lungs; Christie Brinkley of season twenty-eight withdrew on the day of the season premiere due to an injury to her arm that required surgery; she was replaced by her daughter Sailor; Ray Lewis, also of season twenty-eight, withdrew due to a toe injury sustained during rehearsals; Jeannie Mai of season 29 withdrew due to being hospitalized for epiglottitis; and Selma Blair of season 31 withdrew when it became too risky to continue dancing due to her multiple sclerosis.

Fifty-four professional dancers have partnered with the celebrities. The thirty-four winners of the show, in chronological order, are Kelly Monaco, Drew Lachey, Emmitt Smith, Apolo Anton Ohno, Hélio Castroneves, Kristi Yamaguchi, Brooke Burke, Shawn Johnson, Donny Osmond, Nicole Scherzinger, Jennifer Grey, Hines Ward, J. R. Martinez, Donald Driver, Melissa Rycroft, Kellie Pickler, Amber Riley, Meryl Davis, Alfonso Ribeiro, Rumer Willis, Bindi Irwin, Nyle DiMarco, Laurie Hernandez, Rashad Jennings, Jordan Fisher, Adam Rippon, Bobby Bones, Hannah Brown, Kaitlyn Bristowe, Iman Shumpert, Charli D'Amelio, Xochitl Gomez, Joey Graziadei, and Robert Irwin. The nineteen professional partners who have won, in chronological order by first win, are Alec Mazo, Cheryl Burke (twice), Julianne Hough (twice), Mark Ballas (three times), Derek Hough (six times), Kym Johnson (twice), Karina Smirnoff, Peta Murgatroyd (twice), Tony Dovolani, Maksim Chmerkovskiy, Witney Carson (twice), Valentin Chmerkovskiy (three times), Emma Slater, Lindsay Arnold, Jenna Johnson (twice), Sharna Burgess, Alan Bersten, Artem Chigvintsev and Daniella Karagach.

== Competitors ==
Key
Winners
Runners-up
Third place
Fourth place (beginning with season 27)
Fifth place (beginning with season 32)
Withdrew from competition

=== Seasons 1–10 (2005–2010) ===
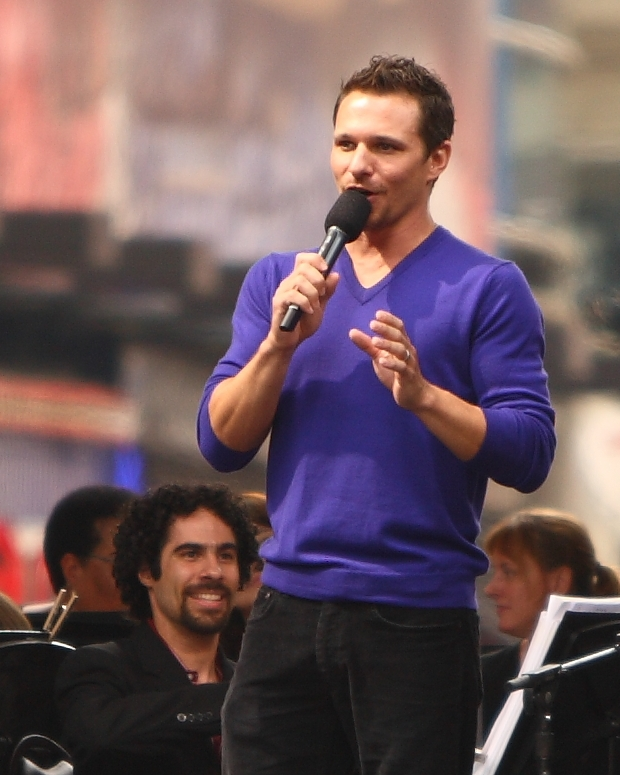
Drew Lachey, winner of season 2 and contestant on season 15

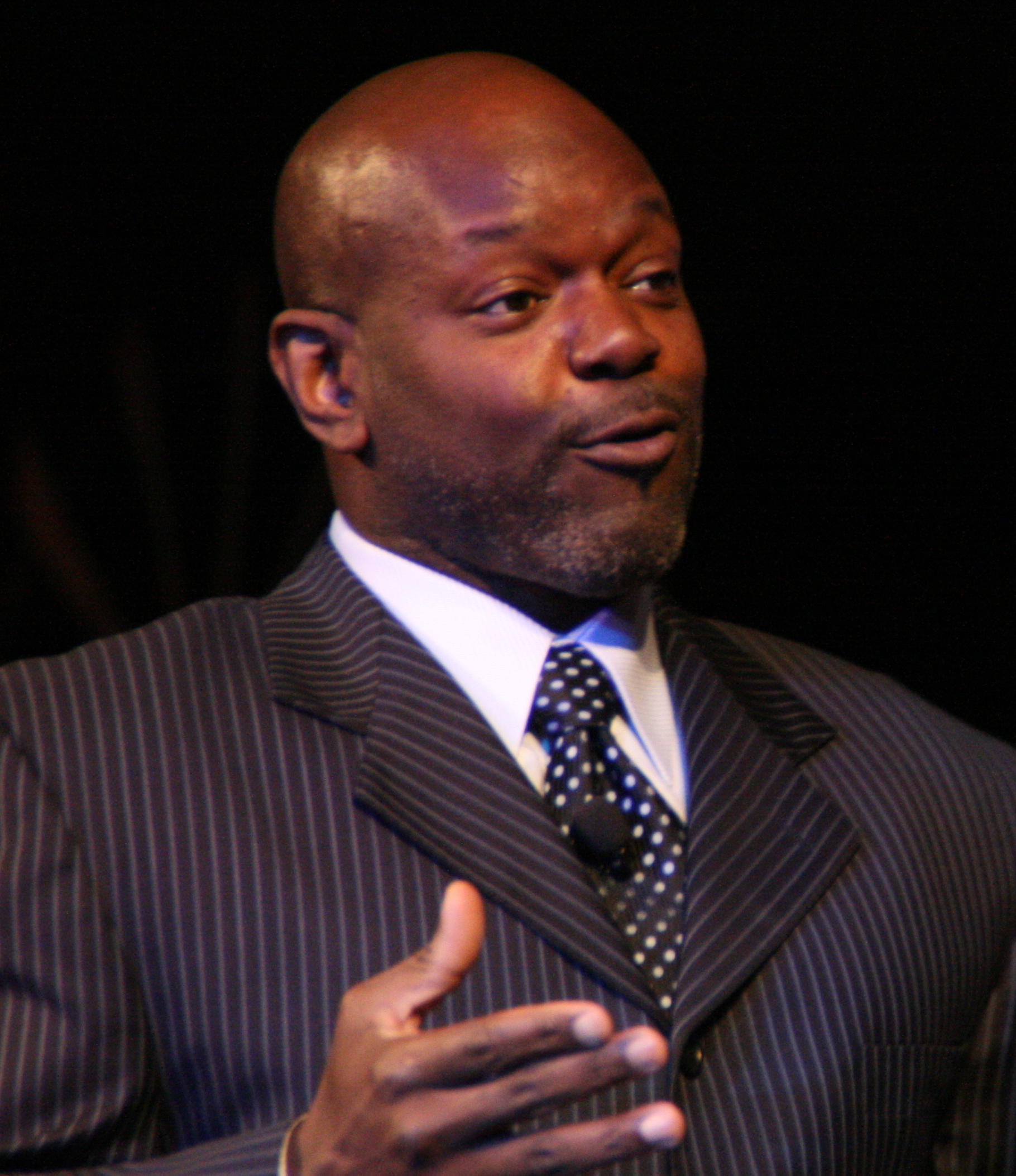
Emmitt Smith, winner of season 3 and contestant on season 15

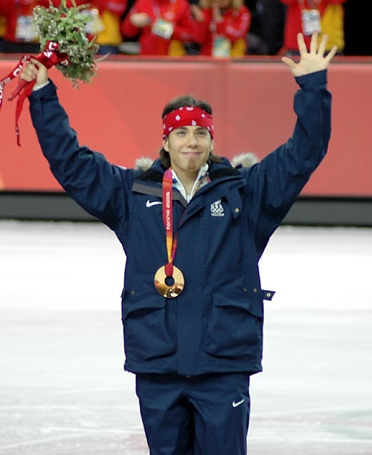
Apolo Anton Ohno, winner of season 4 and contestant on season 15

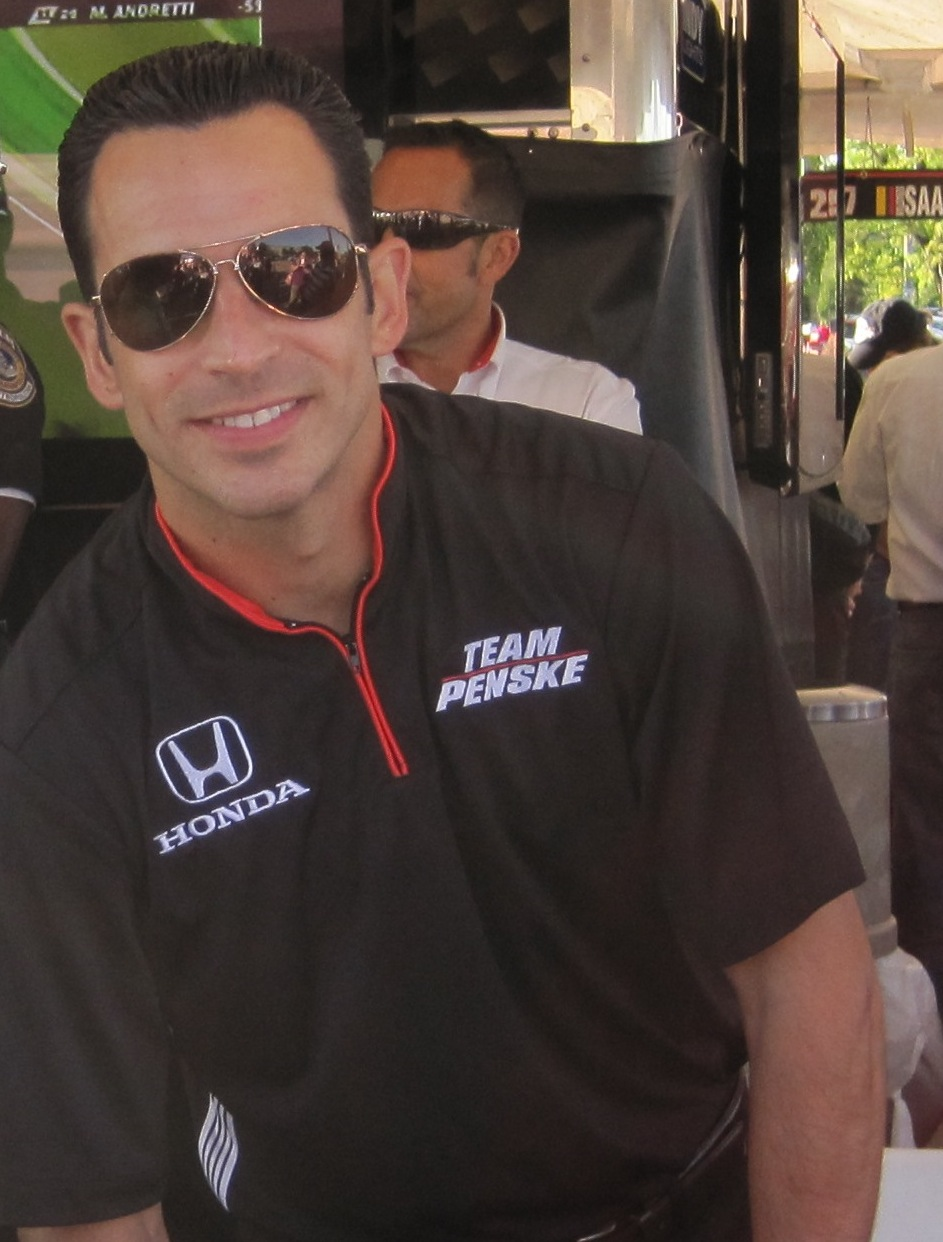
Hélio Castroneves, winner of season 5 and contestant on season 15

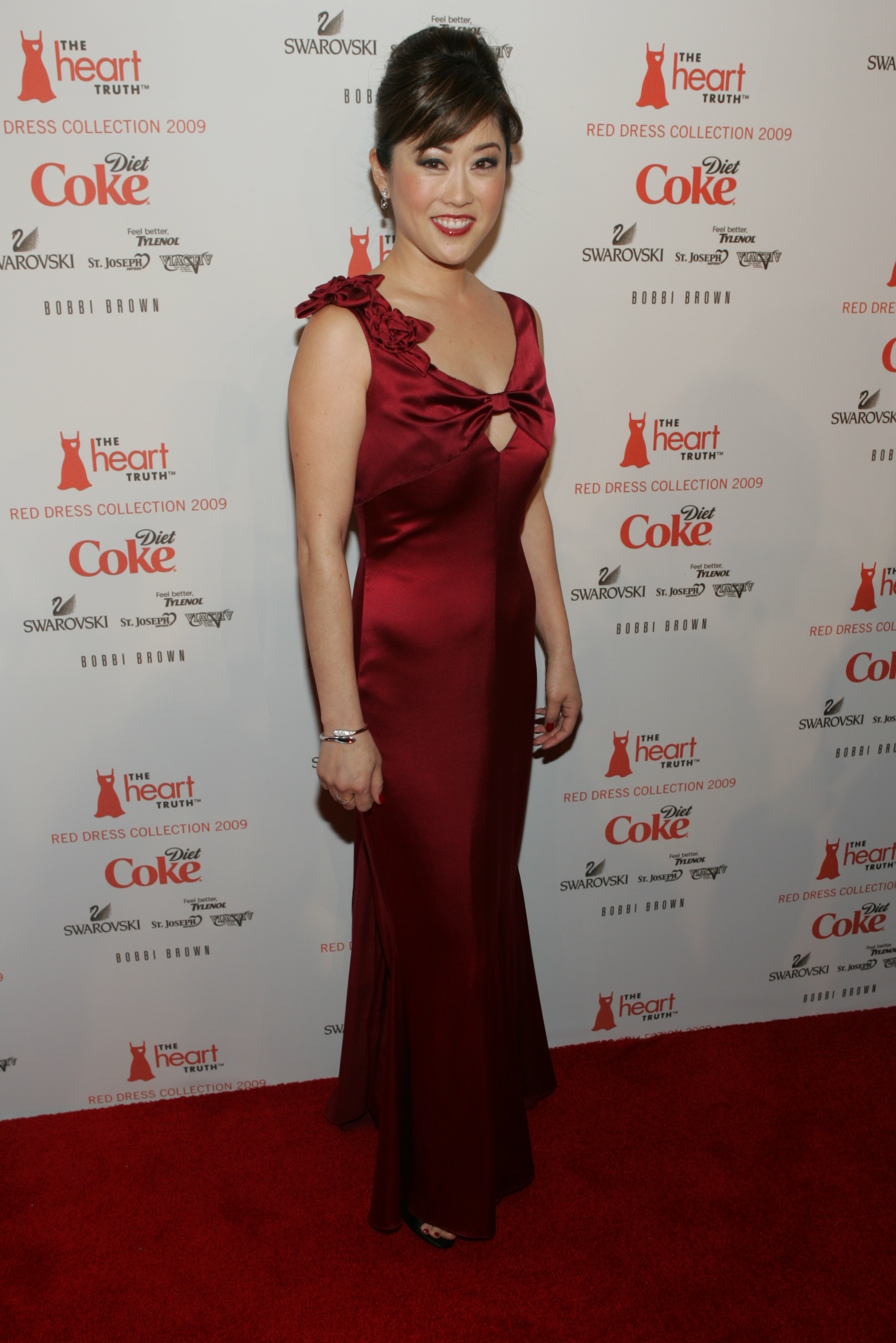
Kristi Yamaguchi, winner of season 6

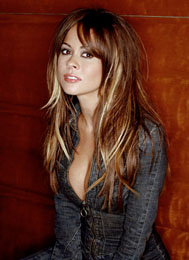
Brooke Burke, winner of season 7 and co-host from seasons 10-17

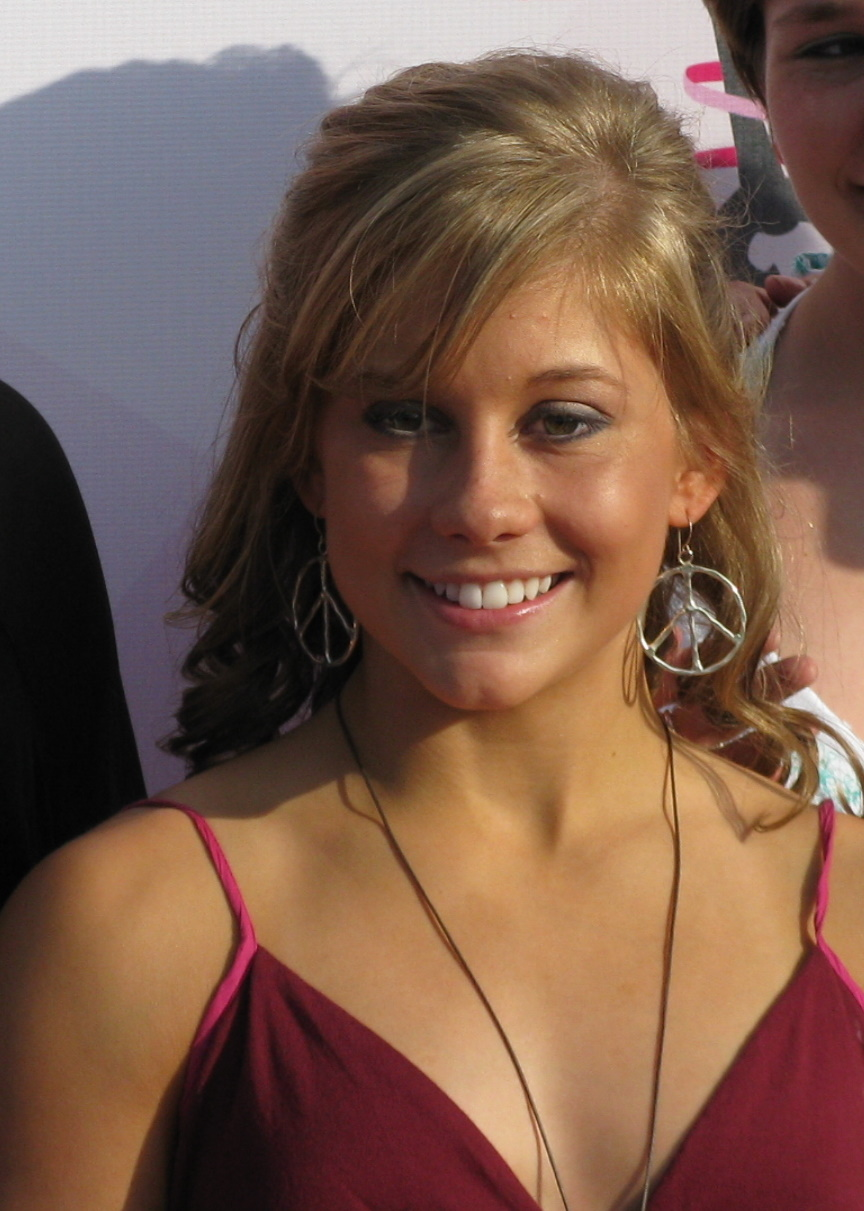
Shawn Johnson, winner of season 8 and runner-up of season 15

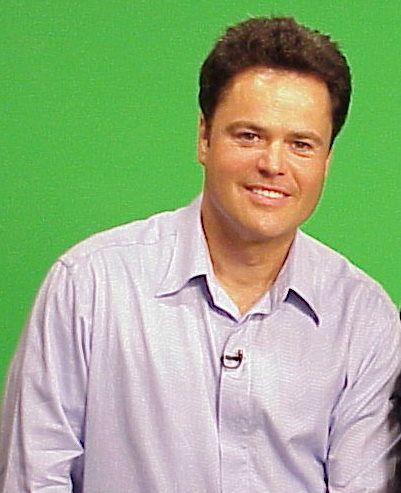
Donny Osmond, winner of season 9

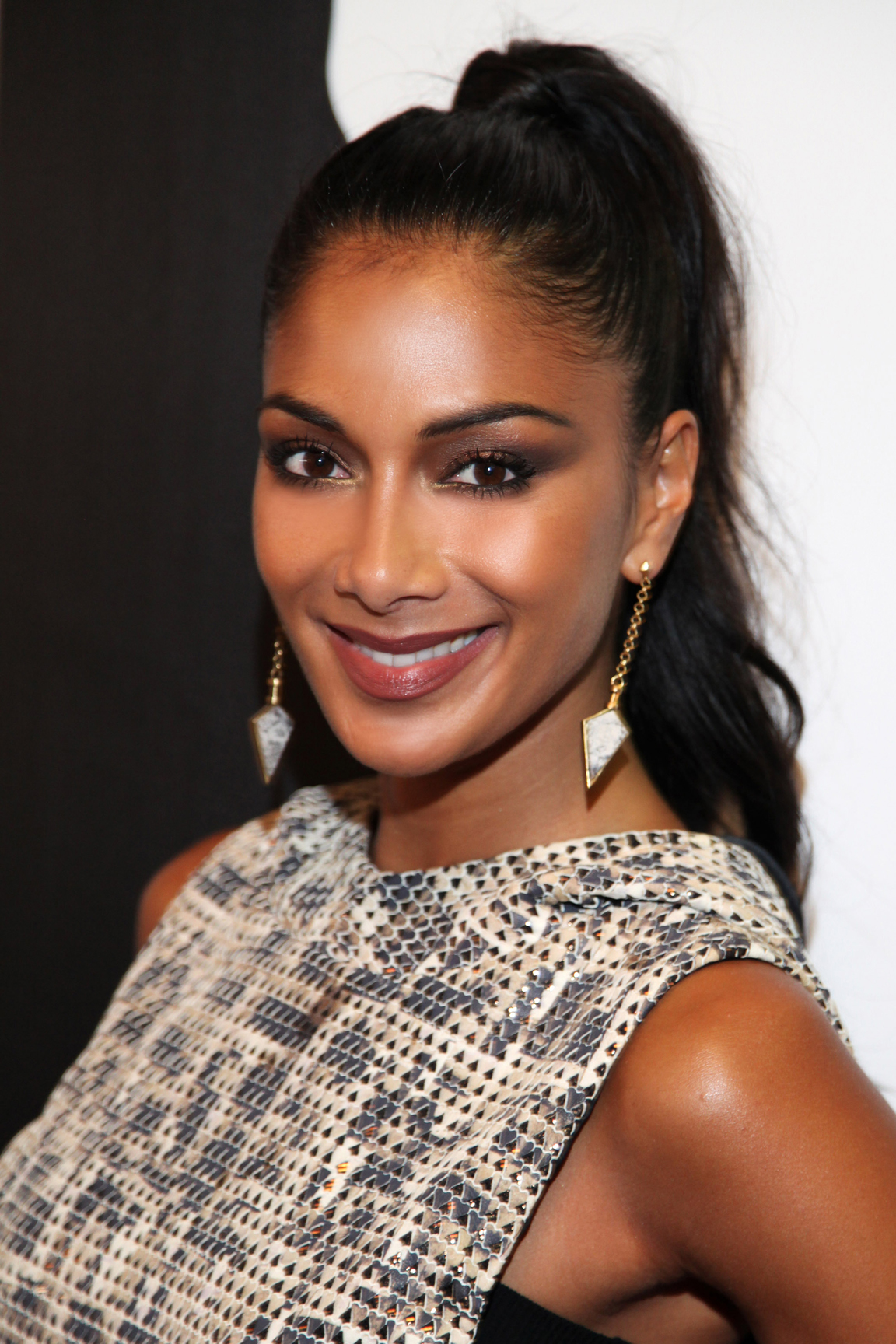
Nicole Scherzinger, winner of season 10

Celebrity	Notability	Professional partner	Season	Finish
Trista Sutter	The Bachelorette star	Louis van Amstel	Season 1	6th
Evander Holyfield	Heavyweight boxer	Edyta Śliwińska	Season 1	5th
Rachel Hunter	Supermodel	Jonathan Roberts	Season 1	4th
Joey McIntyre	New Kids on the Block singer	Ashly DelGrosso	Season 1	3rd
John O'Hurley	Television actor & game show host	Charlotte Jørgensen	Season 1	2nd
Kelly Monaco	General Hospital actress	Alec Mazo	Season 1	1st
Kenny Mayne	ESPN anchorman	Andrea Hale	Season 2	10th
Tatum O'Neal	Film actress	Nick Kosovich	Season 2	9th
Giselle Fernandez	Television journalist	Jonathan Roberts	Season 2	8th
Master P	Rapper & entrepreneur	Ashly DelGrosso	Season 2	7th
Tia Carrere	Actress & model	Maksim Chmerkovskiy	Season 2	6th
George Hamilton	Actor	Edyta Śliwińska	Season 2	5th
Lisa Rinna	Television actress & host	Louis van Amstel	Season 2	4th
Stacy Keibler	WWE Diva	Tony Dovolani	Season 2	3rd
Jerry Rice	NFL wide receiver	Anna Trebunskaya	Season 2	2nd
Drew Lachey	98 Degrees singer	Cheryl Burke	Season 2	1st
Tucker Carlson	News anchor & commentator	Elena Grinenko	Season 3	11th
Shanna Moakler	Model, actress & reality television personality	Jesse DeSoto	Season 3	10th
Harry Hamlin	Film & television actor	Ashly DelGrosso	Season 3	9th
Vivica A. Fox	Film actress & producer	Nick Kosovich	Season 3	8th
Willa Ford	Pop singer & actress	Maksim Chmerkovskiy	Season 3	7th
Sara Evans	Country music singer	Tony Dovolani	Season 3	WD
Jerry Springer	Talk show host	Kym Johnson	Season 3	5th
Monique Coleman	High School Musical actress	Louis van Amstel	Season 3	4th
Joey Lawrence	Television actor	Edyta Śliwińska	Season 3	3rd
Mario Lopez	Television actor & host	Karina Smirnoff	Season 3	2nd
Emmitt Smith	NFL running back	Cheryl Burke	Season 3	1st
Paulina Porizkova	Supermodel	Alec Mazo	Season 4	11th
Shandi Finnessey	Miss USA 2004	Brian Fortuna	Season 4	10th
Leeza Gibbons	Talk-show host	Tony Dovolani	Season 4	9th
Clyde Drexler	NBA player	Elena Grinenko	Season 4	8th
Heather Mills	Model & charity campaigner	Jonathan Roberts	Season 4	7th
John Ratzenberger	Film & television actor & author	Edyta Śliwińska	Season 4	6th
Billy Ray Cyrus	Country music singer & actor	Karina Smirnoff	Season 4	5th
Ian Ziering	Television actor	Cheryl Burke	Season 4	4th
Laila Ali	Professional boxer	Maksim Chmerkovskiy	Season 4	3rd
Joey Fatone	NSYNC singer & actor	Kym Johnson	Season 4	2nd
Apolo Anton Ohno	Olympic speed skater	Julianne Hough	Season 4	1st
Josie Maran	Model & actress	Alec Mazo	Season 5	12th
Albert Reed	Supermodel	Anna Trebunskaya	Season 5	11th
Wayne Newton	Las Vegas entertainer	Cheryl Burke	Season 5	10th
Floyd Mayweather Jr.	Professional boxer	Karina Smirnoff	Season 5	9th
Mark Cuban	Dallas Mavericks owner & entrepreneur	Kym Johnson	Season 5	8th
Sabrina Bryan	The Cheetah Girls singer & actress	Mark Ballas	Season 5	7th
Jane Seymour	Film & television actress	Tony Dovolani	Season 5	6th
Cameron Mathison	All My Children actor & TV host	Edyta Śliwińska	Season 5	5th
Jennie Garth	Television actress	Derek Hough	Season 5	4th
Marie Osmond	Entertainer	Jonathan Roberts	Season 5	3rd
Mel B	Spice Girls singer	Maksim Chmerkovskiy	Season 5	2nd
Hélio Castroneves	Indy 500 champion	Julianne Hough	Season 5	1st
Penn Jillette	Magician	Kym Johnson	Season 6	12th
Monica Seles	Professional tennis player	Jonathan Roberts	Season 6	11th
Steve Guttenberg	Film actor	Anna Trebunskaya	Season 6	10th
Adam Carolla	Comedian & radio host	Julianne Hough	Season 6	9th
Priscilla Presley	Actress & businesswoman	Louis van Amstel	Season 6	8th
Marlee Matlin	Film & television actress	Fabian Sanchez	Season 6	7th
Shannon Elizabeth	American Pie actress	Derek Hough	Season 6	6th
Mario	R&B singer	Karina Smirnoff	Season 6	5th
Marissa Jaret Winokur	Broadway actress	Tony Dovolani	Season 6	4th
Cristián de la Fuente	Film & television actor	Cheryl Burke	Season 6	3rd
Jason Taylor	NFL defensive end	Edyta Śliwińska	Season 6	2nd
Kristi Yamaguchi	Olympic figure skater	Mark Ballas	Season 6	1st
Jeffrey Ross	Stand-up comedian	Edyta Śliwińska	Season 7	13th
Ted McGinley	Film & television actor	Inna Brayer	Season 7	12th
Kim Kardashian	Reality television personality	Mark Ballas	Season 7	11th
Misty May-Treanor	Olympic beach volleyball player	Maksim Chmerkovskiy	Season 7	WD
Rocco DiSpirito	Celebrity chef & author	Karina Smirnoff	Season 7	9th
Toni Braxton	Singer-songwriter	Alec Mazo	Season 7	8th
Cloris Leachman	Film & television actress	Corky Ballas	Season 7	7th
Susan Lucci	All My Children actress	Tony Dovolani	Season 7	6th
Maurice Greene	Olympic sprinter	Cheryl Burke	Season 7	5th
Cody Linley	Hannah Montana actor	Julianne Hough	Season 7	4th
Lance Bass	NSYNC singer	Lacey Schwimmer	Season 7	3rd
Warren Sapp	NFL defensive tackle	Kym Johnson	Season 7	2nd
Brooke Burke	Model & television host	Derek Hough	Season 7	1st
Belinda Carlisle	Singer-songwriter	Jonathan Roberts	Season 8	13th
Denise Richards	Actress	Maksim Chmerkovskiy	Season 8	12th
Holly Madison	Playboy model & reality television personality	Dmitry Chaplin	Season 8	11th
Steve Wozniak	Apple co-founder	Karina Smirnoff	Season 8	10th
David Alan Grier	Actor & comedian	Kym Johnson	Season 8	9th
Steve-O	Jackass star	Lacey Schwimmer	Season 8	8th
Lawrence Taylor	NFL linebacker	Edyta Śliwińska	Season 8	7th
Chuck Wicks	Country singer	Julianne Hough	Season 8	6th
Lil' Kim	Rapper	Derek Hough	Season 8	5th
Ty Murray	Rodeo cowboy	Chelsie Hightower	Season 8	4th
Melissa Rycroft	The Bachelor contestant	Tony Dovolani	Season 8	3rd
Gilles Marini	Actor	Cheryl Burke	Season 8	2nd
Shawn Johnson	Olympic artistic gymnast	Mark Ballas	Season 8	1st
Ashley Hamilton	Actor & comedian	Edyta Śliwińska	Season 9	16th
Macy Gray	R&B singer	Jonathan Roberts	Season 9	15th
Kathy Ireland	Model & entrepreneur	Tony Dovolani	Season 9	14th
Tom DeLay	U.S. House Majority Leader	Cheryl Burke	Season 9	WD
Debi Mazar	Film & television actress	Maksim Chmerkovskiy	Season 9	12th
Chuck Liddell	UFC fighter	Anna Trebunskaya	Season 9	11th
Natalie Coughlin	Olympic swimmer	Alec Mazo	Season 9	10th
Melissa Joan Hart	Television actress	Mark Ballas	Season 9	9th
Louie Vito	Snowboarder	Chelsie Hightower	Season 9	8th
Michael Irvin	NFL player	Anna Demidova	Season 9	7th
Mark Dacascos	Iron Chef America chairman	Lacey Schwimmer	Season 9	6th
Aaron Carter	Singer & actor	Karina Smirnoff	Season 9	5th
Joanna Krupa	Model & actress	Derek Hough	Season 9	4th
Kelly Osbourne	Reality television personality & singer	Louis van Amstel	Season 9	3rd
Mýa	Singer-songwriter & actress	Dmitry Chaplin	Season 9	2nd
Donny Osmond	Singer & actor	Kym Johnson	Season 9	1st
Shannen Doherty	Film & television actress	Mark Ballas	Season 10	11th
Buzz Aldrin	Apollo 11 astronaut	Ashly Costa	Season 10	10th
Aiden Turner	All My Children actor	Edyta Śliwińska	Season 10	9th
Kate Gosselin	Reality television personality	Tony Dovolani	Season 10	8th
Jake Pavelka	The Bachelor star	Chelsie Hightower	Season 10	7th
Pamela Anderson	Playboy model & actress	Damian Whitewood	Season 10	6th
Niecy Nash	Comedian, actress & host	Louis van Amstel	Season 10	5th
Chad Ochocinco	NFL wide receiver	Cheryl Burke	Season 10	4th
Erin Andrews	ESPN sportscaster	Maksim Chmerkovskiy	Season 10	3rd
Evan Lysacek	Olympic figure skater	Anna Trebunskaya	Season 10	2nd
Nicole Scherzinger	Pussycat Dolls singer	Derek Hough	Season 10	1st

=== Seasons 11–20 (2010–2015) ===
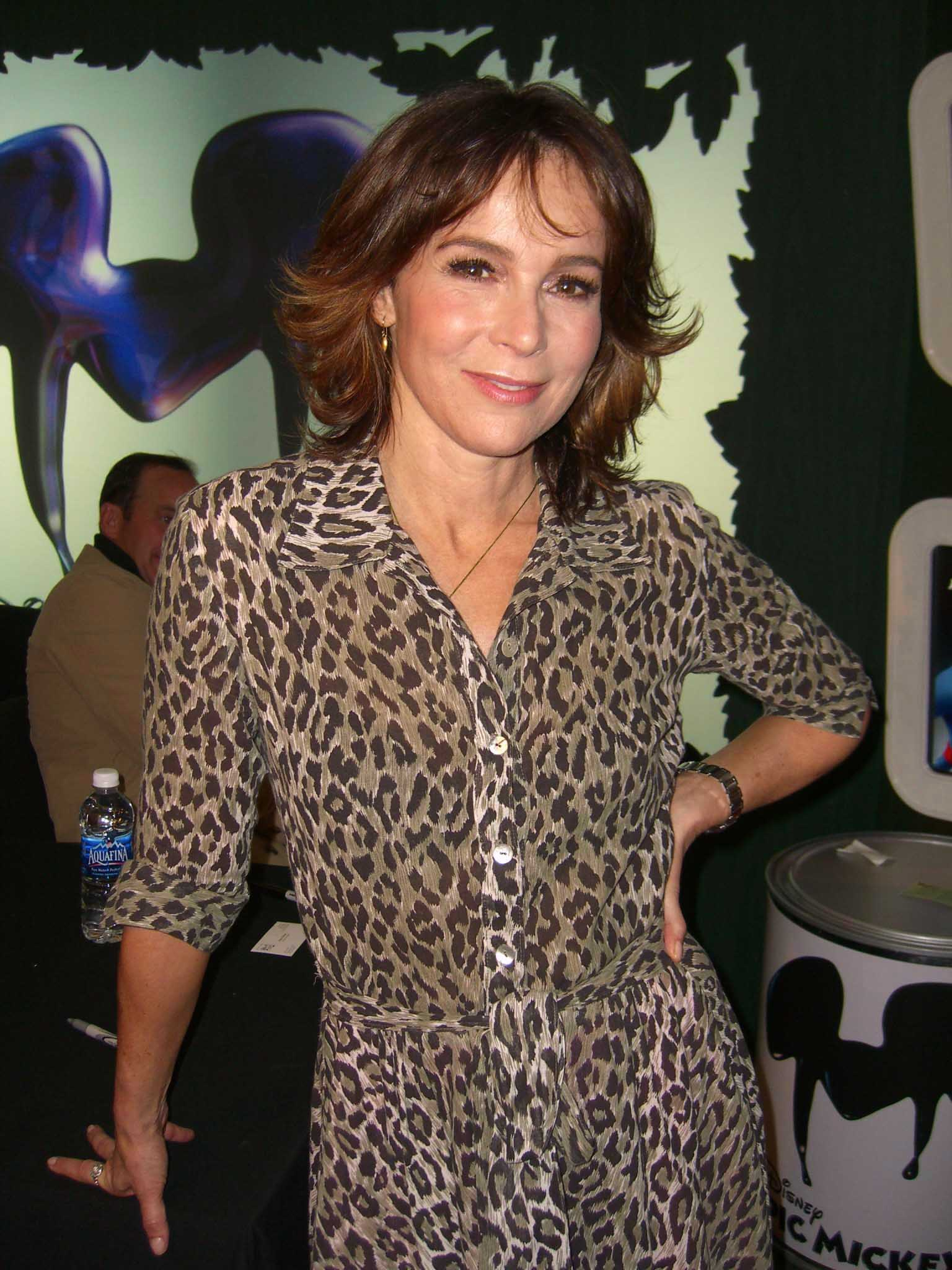
Jennifer Grey, winner of season 11

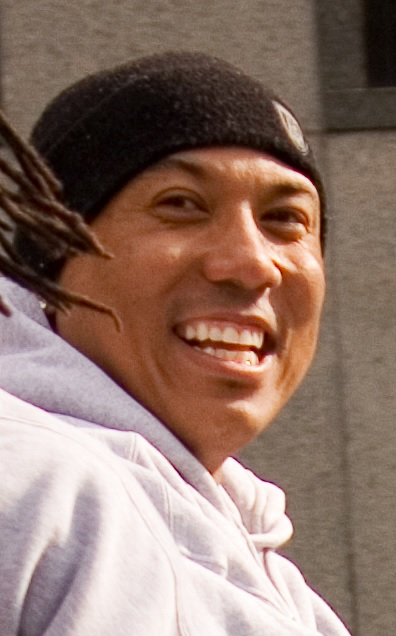
Hines Ward, winner of season 12

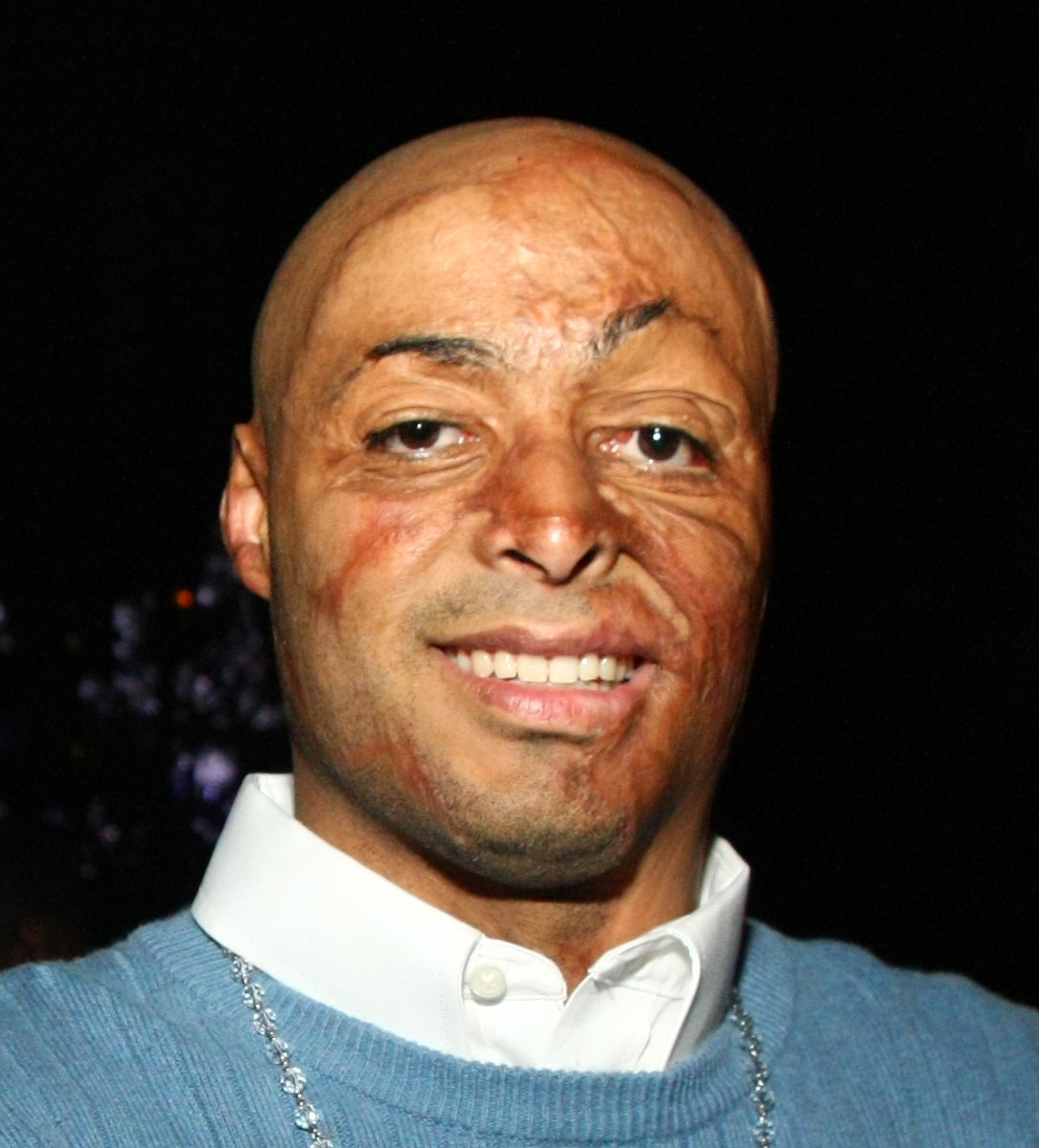
J.R. Martinez, winner of season 13

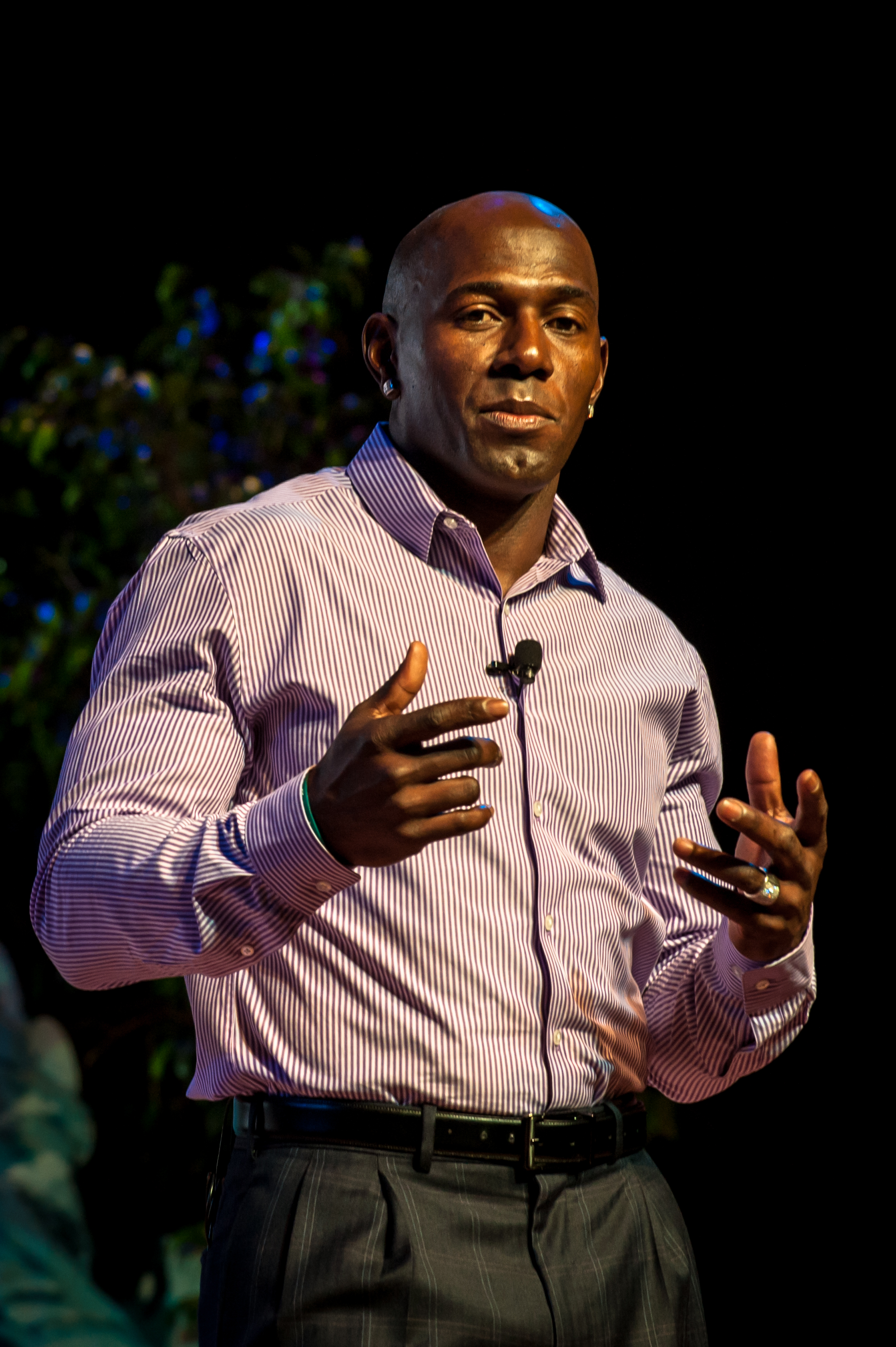
Donald Driver, winner of season 14

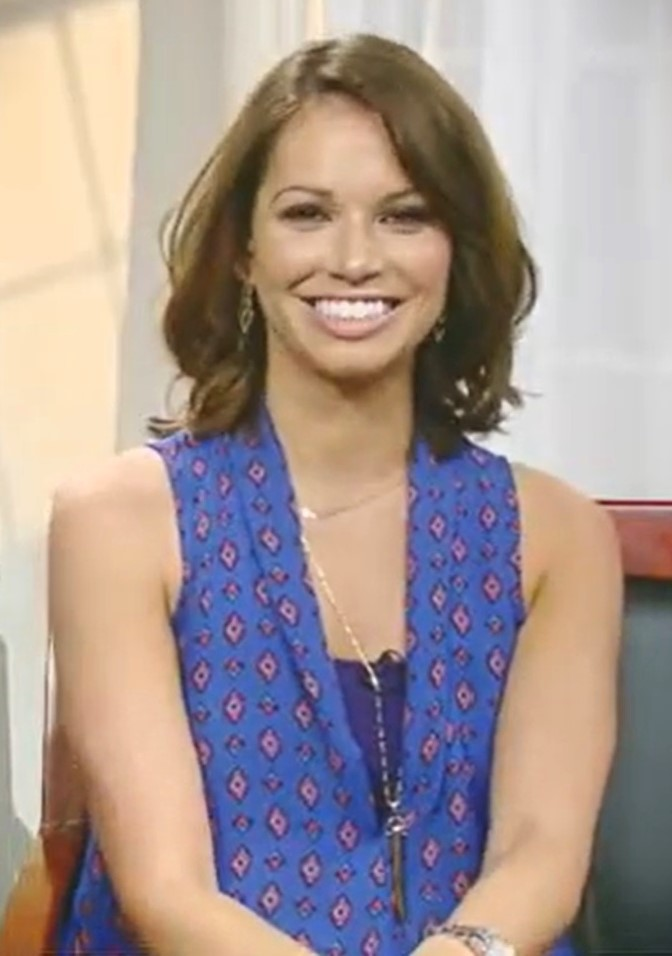
Melissa Rycroft, winner of season 15 and third place of season 8

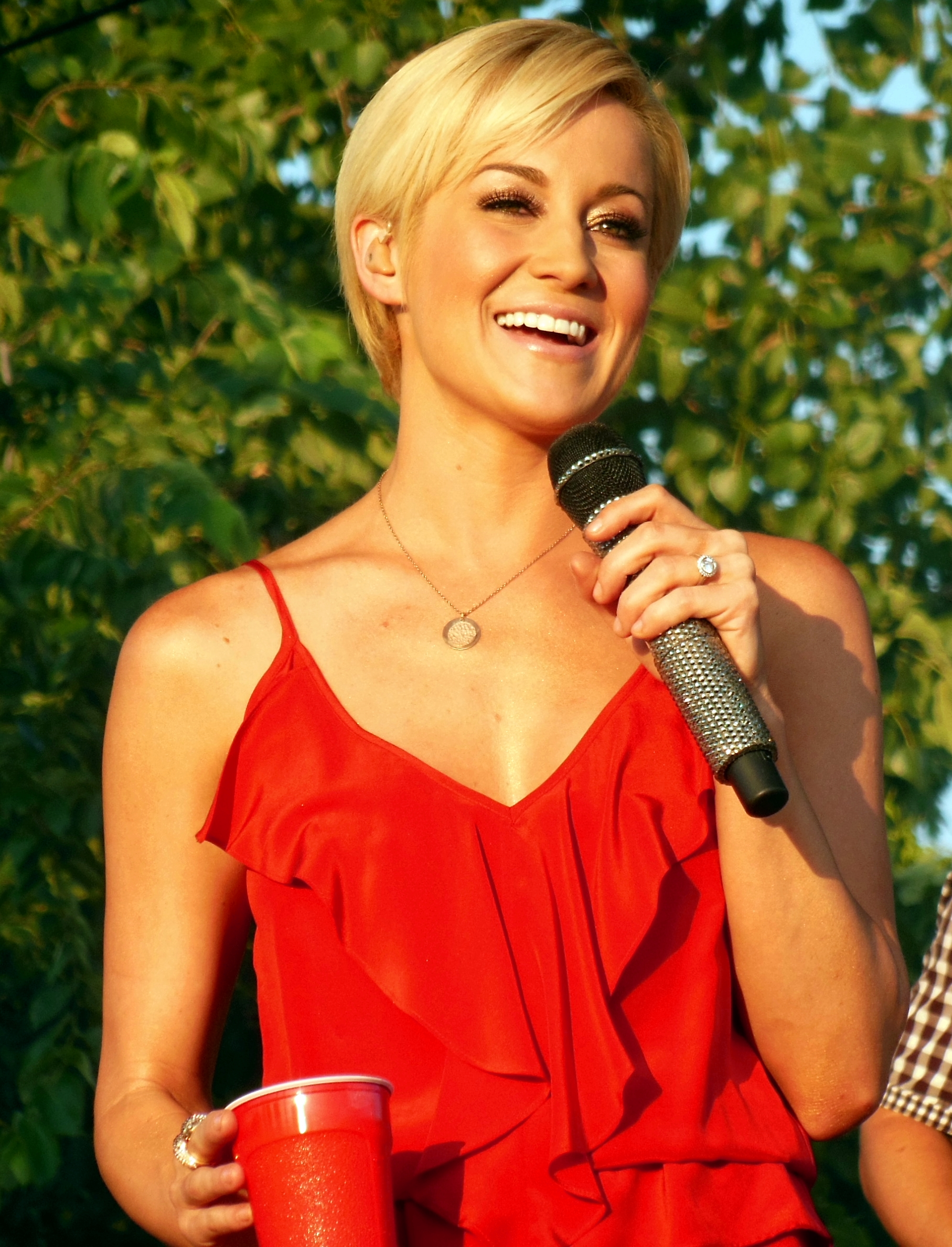
Kellie Pickler, winner of season 16

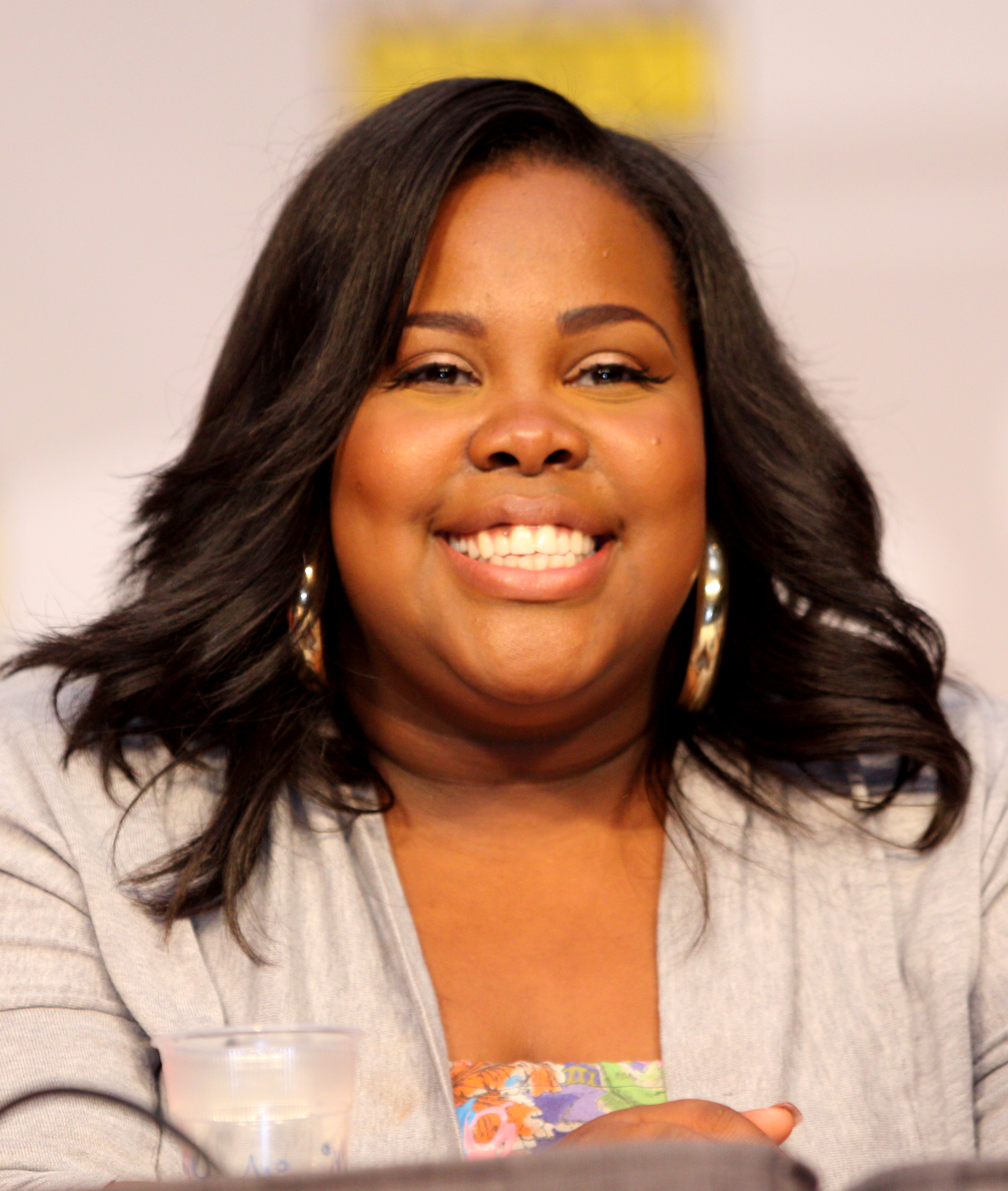
Amber Riley, winner of season 17

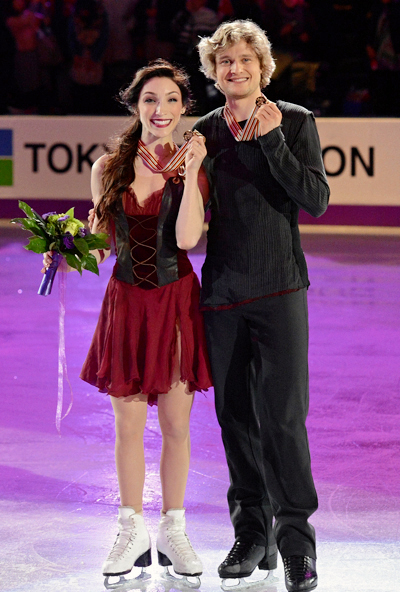
Meryl Davis (winner) and Charlie White (5th place) from season 18

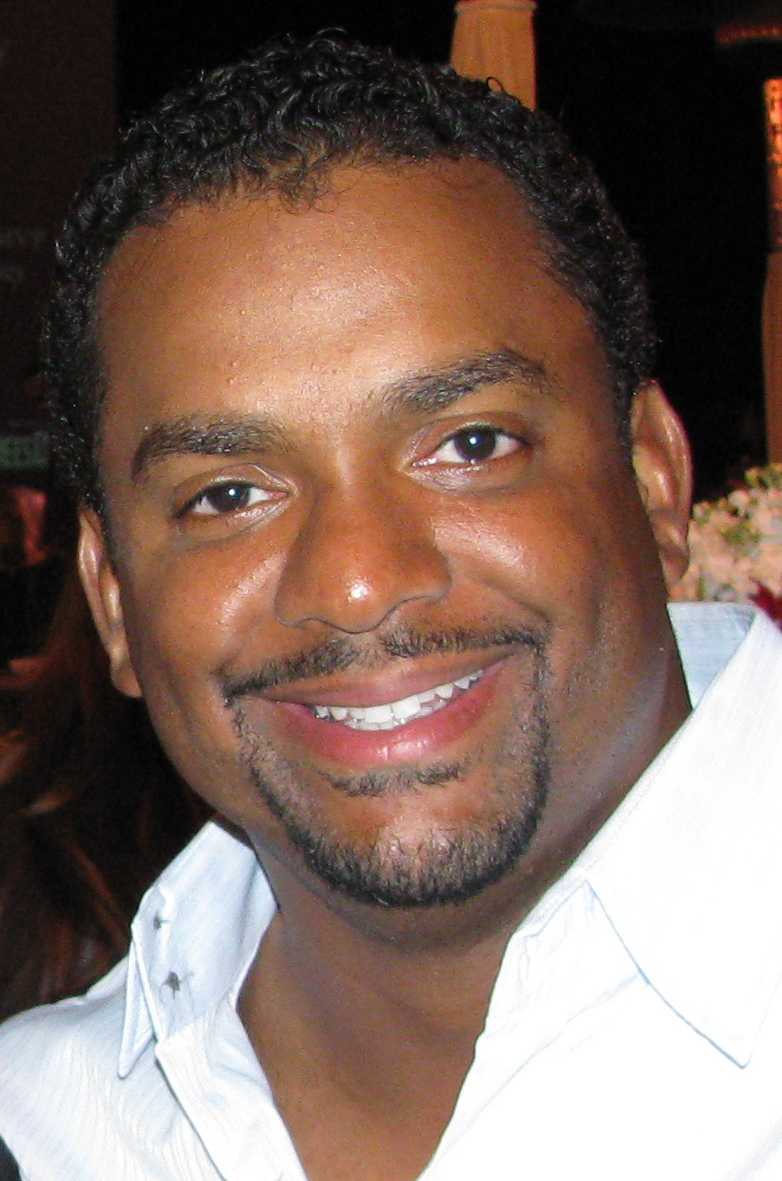
Alfonso Ribeiro, winner of season 19 and co-host since season 31

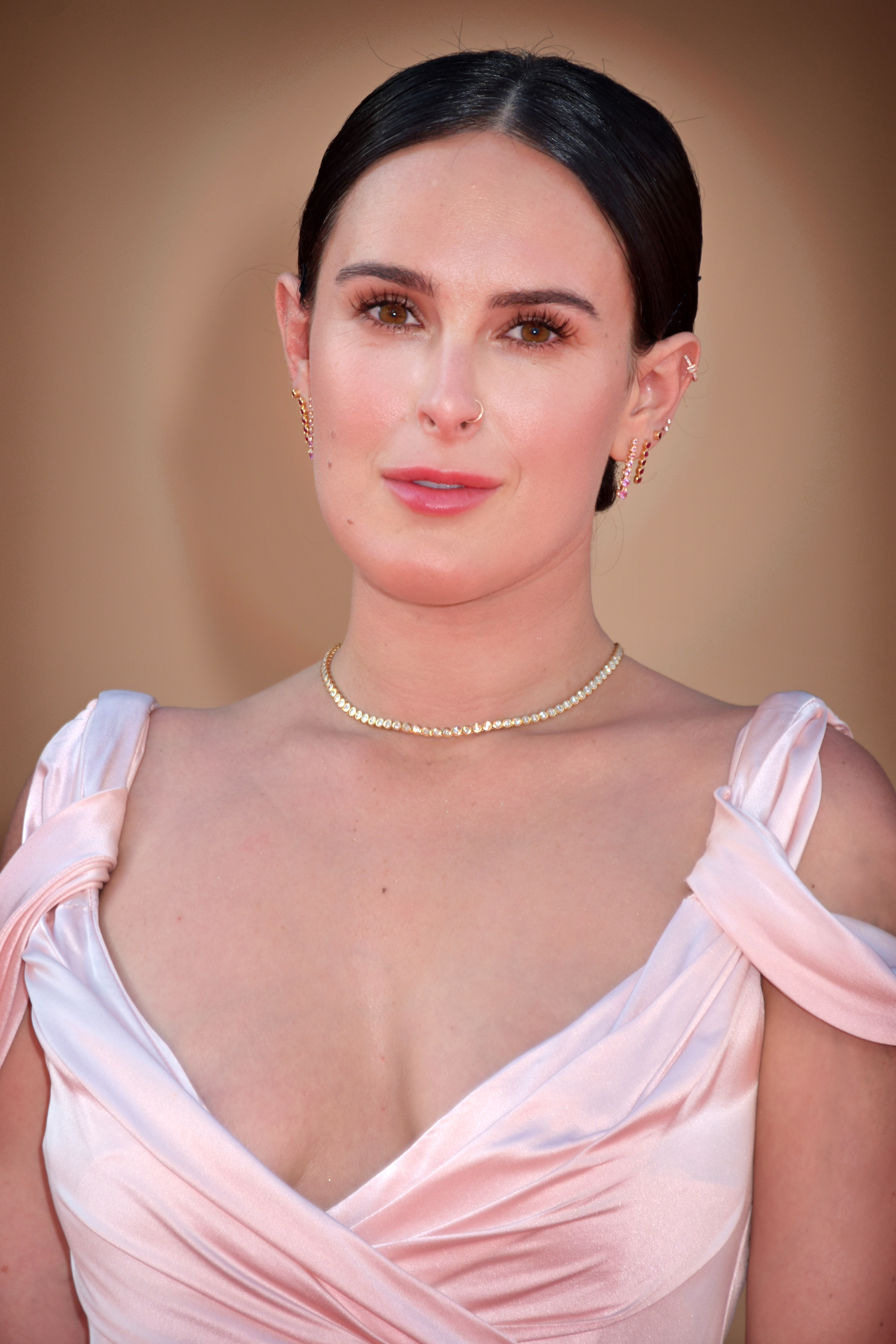
Rumer Willis, winner of season 20

Celebrity	Notability	Professional partner	Season	Finish
David Hasselhoff	Actor & singer	Kym Johnson	Season 11	12th
Michael Bolton	Singer-songwriter	Chelsie Hightower	Season 11	11th
Margaret Cho	Stand-up comedian	Louis van Amstel	Season 11	10th
The Situation	Jersey Shore cast member	Karina Smirnoff	Season 11	9th
Florence Henderson	The Brady Bunch actress	Corky Ballas	Season 11	8th
Audrina Patridge	The Hills cast member	Tony Dovolani	Season 11	7th
Rick Fox	NBA small forward	Cheryl Burke	Season 11	6th
Kurt Warner	NFL quarterback	Anna Trebunskaya	Season 11	5th
Brandy	Singer & actress	Maksim Chmerkovskiy	Season 11	4th
Bristol Palin	Activist, author & daughter of Sarah Palin	Mark Ballas	Season 11	3rd
Kyle Massey	Disney Channel actor & rapper	Lacey Schwimmer	Season 11	2nd
Jennifer Grey	Film & television actress	Derek Hough	Season 11	1st
Mike Catherwood	Radio personality	Lacey Schwimmer	Season 12	11th
Wendy Williams	Talk show host & author	Tony Dovolani	Season 12	10th
Sugar Ray Leonard	Professional boxer	Anna Trebunskaya	Season 12	9th
Petra Němcová	Supermodel	Dmitry Chaplin	Season 12	8th
Chris Jericho	WWE wrestler	Cheryl Burke	Season 12	7th
Kendra Wilkinson	Model & reality television personality	Louis van Amstel	Season 12	6th
Romeo	Rapper & actor	Chelsie Hightower	Season 12	5th
Ralph Macchio	Film actor	Karina Smirnoff	Season 12	4th
Chelsea Kane	Disney Channel actress	Mark Ballas	Season 12	3rd
Kirstie Alley	Film & television actress	Maksim Chmerkovskiy	Season 12	2nd
Hines Ward	NFL wide receiver	Kym Johnson	Season 12	1st
Metta World Peace	NBA small forward	Peta Murgatroyd	Season 13	12th
Elisabetta Canalis	Model & actress	Valentin Chmerkovskiy	Season 13	11th
Kristin Cavallari	Reality television personality	Mark Ballas	Season 13	10th
Chynna Phillips	Wilson Phillips singer & solo artist	Tony Dovolani	Season 13	9th
Carson Kressley	Television host	Anna Trebunskaya	Season 13	8th
Chaz Bono	Transgender activist & author	Lacey Schwimmer	Season 13	7th
David Arquette	Actor	Kym Johnson	Season 13	6th
Nancy Grace	HLN host & prosecutor	Tristan MacManus	Season 13	5th
Hope Solo	U.S. national soccer team goalkeeper	Maksim Chmerkovskiy	Season 13	4th
Ricki Lake	Actress & talk show host	Derek Hough	Season 13	3rd
Rob Kardashian	Reality television personality	Cheryl Burke	Season 13	2nd
J.R. Martinez	Actor & Army veteran	Karina Smirnoff	Season 13	1st
Martina Navratilova	Professional tennis player	Tony Dovolani	Season 14	12th
Jack Wagner	Actor & singer	Anna Trebunskaya	Season 14	11th
Sherri Shepherd	The View panelist & actress	Valentin Chmerkovskiy	Season 14	10th
Gavin DeGraw	Singer-songwriter	Karina Smirnoff	Season 14	9th
Gladys Knight	Soul singer	Tristan MacManus	Season 14	8th
Jaleel White	Television actor	Kym Johnson	Season 14	7th
Roshon Fegan	Disney Channel actor & rapper	Chelsie Hightower	Season 14	6th
Melissa Gilbert	Actress	Maksim Chmerkovskiy	Season 14	5th
Maria Menounos	Television host	Derek Hough	Season 14	4th
William Levy	Telenovela actor	Cheryl Burke	Season 14	3rd
Katherine Jenkins	Classical singer	Mark Ballas	Season 14	2nd
Donald Driver	NFL wide receiver	Peta Murgatroyd	Season 14	1st
Pamela Anderson	Season 10	Tristan MacManus	Season 15 (All-Stars)	13th
Joey Fatone	Season 4	Kym Johnson	Season 15 (All-Stars)	12th
Drew Lachey	Season 2	Anna Trebunskaya	Season 15 (All-Stars)	11th
Hélio Castroneves	Season 5	Chelsie Hightower	Season 15 (All-Stars)	10th
Bristol Palin	Season 11	Mark Ballas	Season 15 (All-Stars)	9th
Sabrina Bryan	Season 5	Louis van Amstel	Season 15 (All-Stars)	8th
Kirstie Alley	Season 12	Maksim Chmerkovskiy	Season 15 (All-Stars)	7th
Gilles Marini	Season 8	Peta Murgatroyd	Season 15 (All-Stars)	6th
Apolo Anton Ohno	Season 4	Karina Smirnoff	Season 15 (All-Stars)	5th
Emmitt Smith	Season 3	Cheryl Burke	Season 15 (All-Stars)	4th
Kelly Monaco	Season 1	Valentin Chmerkovskiy	Season 15 (All-Stars)	3rd
Shawn Johnson	Season 8	Derek Hough	Season 15 (All-Stars)	2nd
Melissa Rycroft	Season 8	Tony Dovolani	Season 15 (All-Stars)	1st
Dorothy Hamill	Olympic figure skater	Tristan MacManus	Season 16	WD
Wynonna Judd	Country music singer	Tony Dovolani	Season 16	11th
Lisa Vanderpump	Reality television personality	Gleb Savchenko	Season 16	10th
D.L. Hughley	Comedian & television actor	Cheryl Burke	Season 16	9th
Victor Ortiz	Professional boxer	Lindsay Arnold	Season 16	8th
Andy Dick	Actor & comedian	Sharna Burgess	Season 16	7th
Sean Lowe	Reality television personality	Peta Murgatroyd	Season 16	6th
Ingo Rademacher	General Hospital actor	Kym Johnson	Season 16	5th
Alexandra Raisman	Olympic artistic gymnast	Mark Ballas	Season 16	4th
Jacoby Jones	NFL wide receiver	Karina Smirnoff	Season 16	3rd
Zendaya	Disney Channel actress	Valentin Chmerkovskiy	Season 16	2nd
Kellie Pickler	Country music singer	Derek Hough	Season 16	1st
Keyshawn Johnson	NFL wide receiver	Sharna Burgess	Season 17	12th
Bill Nye	Science education host	Tyne Stecklein	Season 17	11th
Valerie Harper	Television actress	Tristan MacManus	Season 17	10th
Christina Milian	Singer & actress	Mark Ballas	Season 17	9th
Nicole "Snooki" Polizzi	Jersey Shore cast member	Sasha Farber	Season 17	8th
Brant Daugherty	Pretty Little Liars actor	Peta Murgatroyd	Season 17	7th
Elizabeth Berkley Lauren	Film & television actress	Valentin Chmerkovskiy	Season 17	6th
Leah Remini	Television actress	Tony Dovolani	Season 17	5th
Bill Engvall	Stand-up comedian & actor	Emma Slater	Season 17	4th
Jack Osbourne	Reality television personality	Cheryl Burke	Season 17	3rd
Corbin Bleu	High School Musical actor	Karina Smirnoff	Season 17	2nd
Amber Riley	Glee actress	Derek Hough	Season 17	1st
Diana Nyad	Long-distance swimmer	Henry Byalikov	Season 18	12th
Sean Avery	NHL player	Karina Smirnoff	Season 18	11th
Billy Dee Williams	Film actor	Emma Slater	Season 18	WD
Cody Simpson	Singer-songwriter	Witney Carson	Season 18	9th
Drew Carey	Television host, actor & comedian	Cheryl Burke	Season 18	8th
NeNe Leakes	Reality television personality & actress	Tony Dovolani	Season 18	7th
Danica McKellar	The Wonder Years actress & author	Valentin Chmerkovskiy	Season 18	6th
Charlie White	Olympic ice dancer	Sharna Burgess	Season 18	5th
James Maslow	Big Time Rush singer & actor	Peta Murgatroyd	Season 18	4th
Candace Cameron Bure	Full House actress & author	Mark Ballas	Season 18	3rd
Amy Purdy	Paralympic snowboarder	Derek Hough	Season 18	2nd
Meryl Davis	Olympic ice dancer	Maksim Chmerkovskiy	Season 18	1st
Lolo Jones	Olympic athlete	Keo Motsepe	Season 19	13th
Tavis Smiley	Television & radio broadcaster	Sharna Burgess	Season 19	12th
Randy Couture	UFC mixed martial artist	Karina Smirnoff	Season 19	11th
Betsey Johnson	Fashion designer	Tony Dovolani	Season 19	10th
Jonathan Bennett	Mean Girls actor	Allison Holker	Season 19	9th
Antonio Sabàto Jr.	General Hospital actor & model	Cheryl Burke	Season 19	8th
Michael Waltrip	NASCAR racer	Emma Slater	Season 19	7th
Lea Thompson	Film & television actress	Artem Chigvintsev	Season 19	6th
Tommy Chong	Comedian & actor	Peta Murgatroyd	Season 19	5th
Bethany Mota	YouTube personality	Derek Hough	Season 19	4th
Janel Parrish	Pretty Little Liars actress	Valentin Chmerkovskiy	Season 19	3rd
Sadie Robertson	Duck Dynasty cast member	Mark Ballas	Season 19	2nd
Alfonso Ribeiro	Television actor	Witney Carson	Season 19	1st
Redfoo	LMFAO singer, producer & rapper	Emma Slater	Season 20	12th
Charlotte McKinney	Model & actress	Keo Motsepe	Season 20	11th
Michael Sam	NFL defensive end	Peta Murgatroyd	Season 20	10th
Suzanne Somers	Television actress & author	Tony Dovolani	Season 20	9th
Patti LaBelle	Soul singer	Artem Chigvintsev	Season 20	8th
Willow Shields	The Hunger Games actress	Mark Ballas	Season 20	7th
Robert Herjavec	Shark Tank panelist & businessman	Kym Johnson	Season 20	6th
Chris Soules	The Bachelor star	Witney Carson	Season 20	5th
Nastia Liukin	Olympic artistic gymnast	Derek Hough	Season 20	4th
Noah Galloway	Soldier & personal trainer	Sharna Burgess	Season 20	3rd
Riker Lynch	R5 singer & actor	Allison Holker	Season 20	2nd
Rumer Willis	Film & television actress	Valentin Chmerkovskiy	Season 20	1st

=== Seasons 21–30 (2015–2021) ===
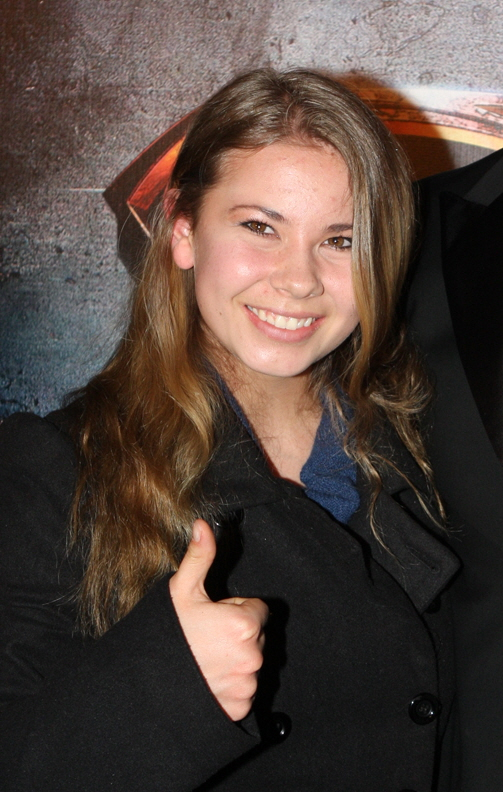
Bindi Irwin, winner of season 21

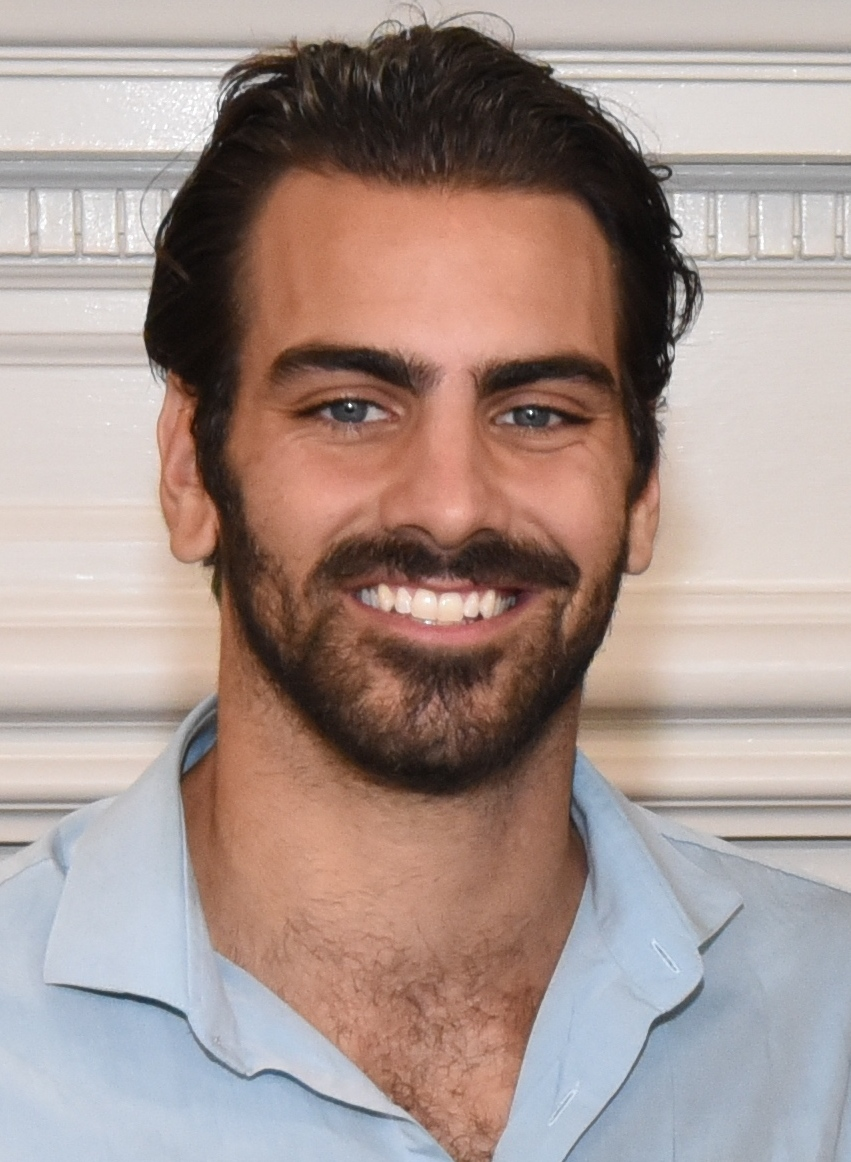
Nyle DiMarco, winner of season 22

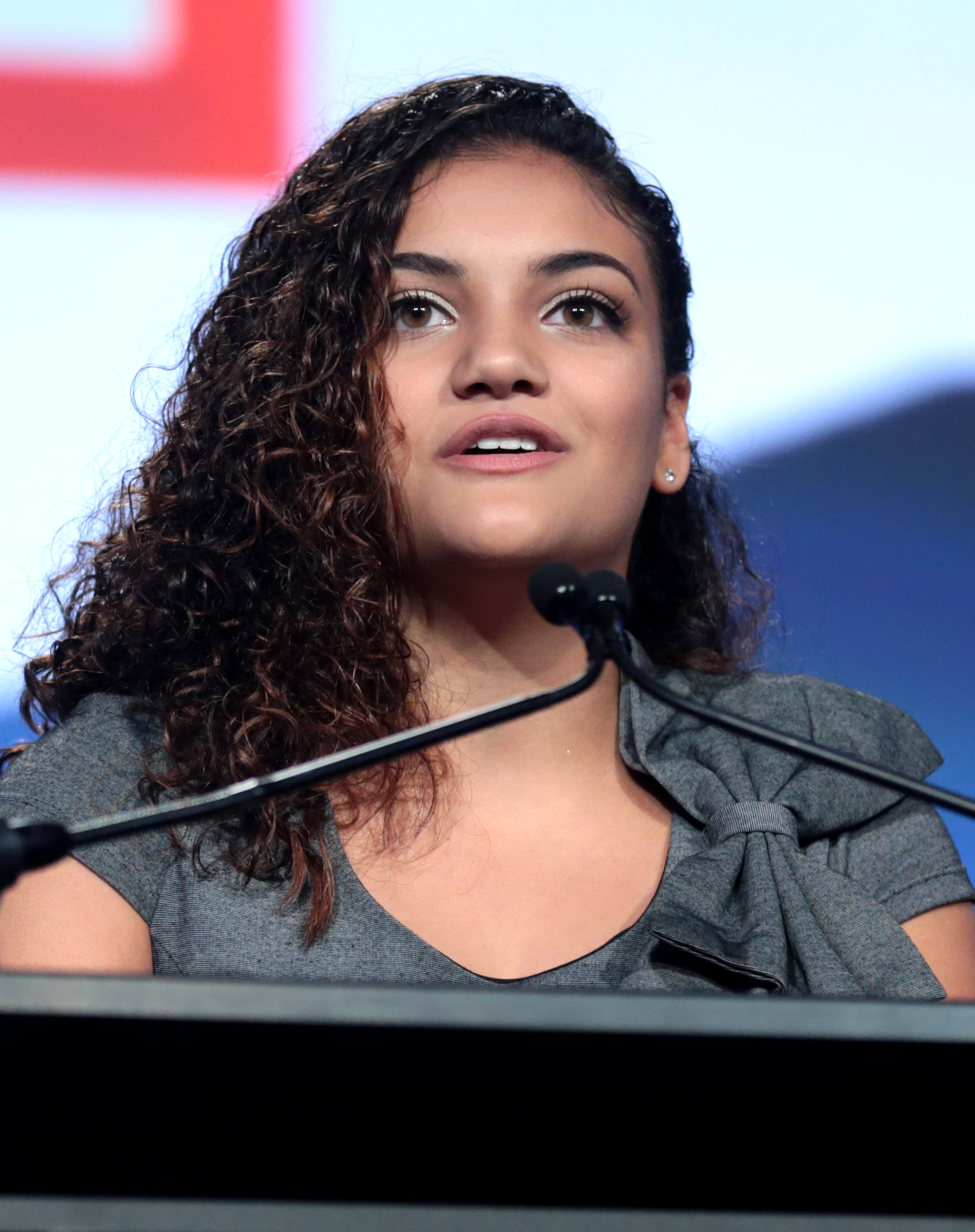
Laurie Hernandez, winner of season 23

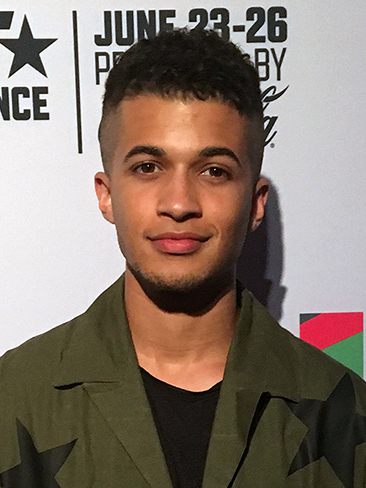
Jordan Fisher, winner of season 25 and host of Dancing with the Stars: Juniors

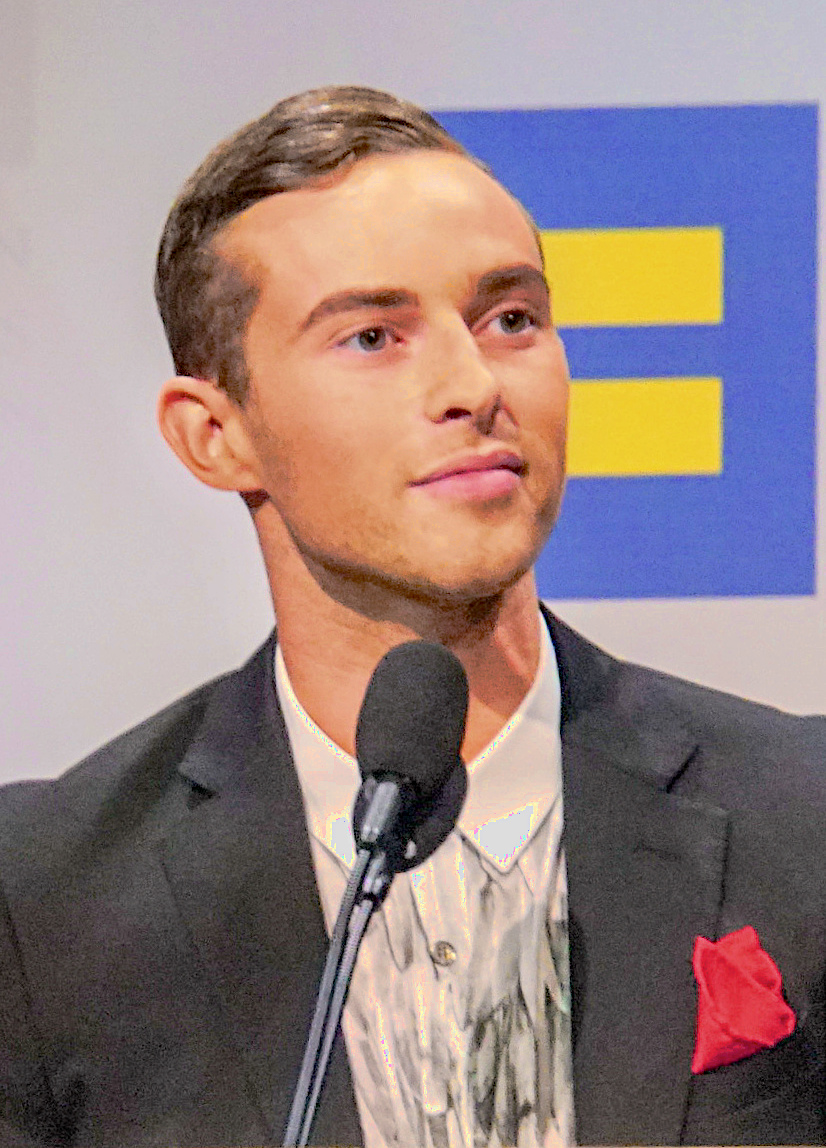
Adam Rippon, winner of season 26

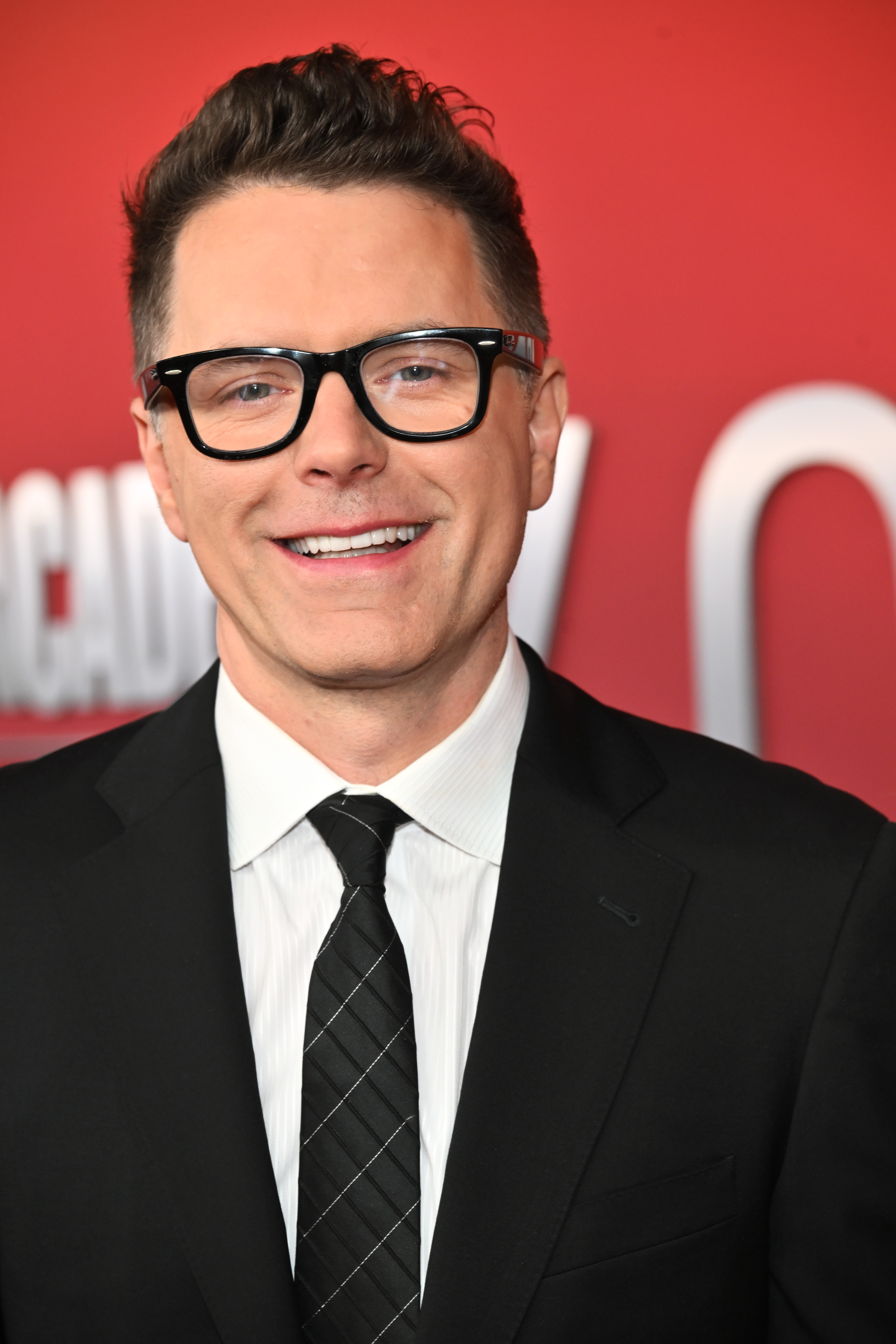
Bobby Bones, winner of season 27

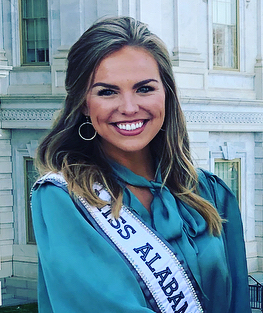
Hannah Brown, winner of season 28

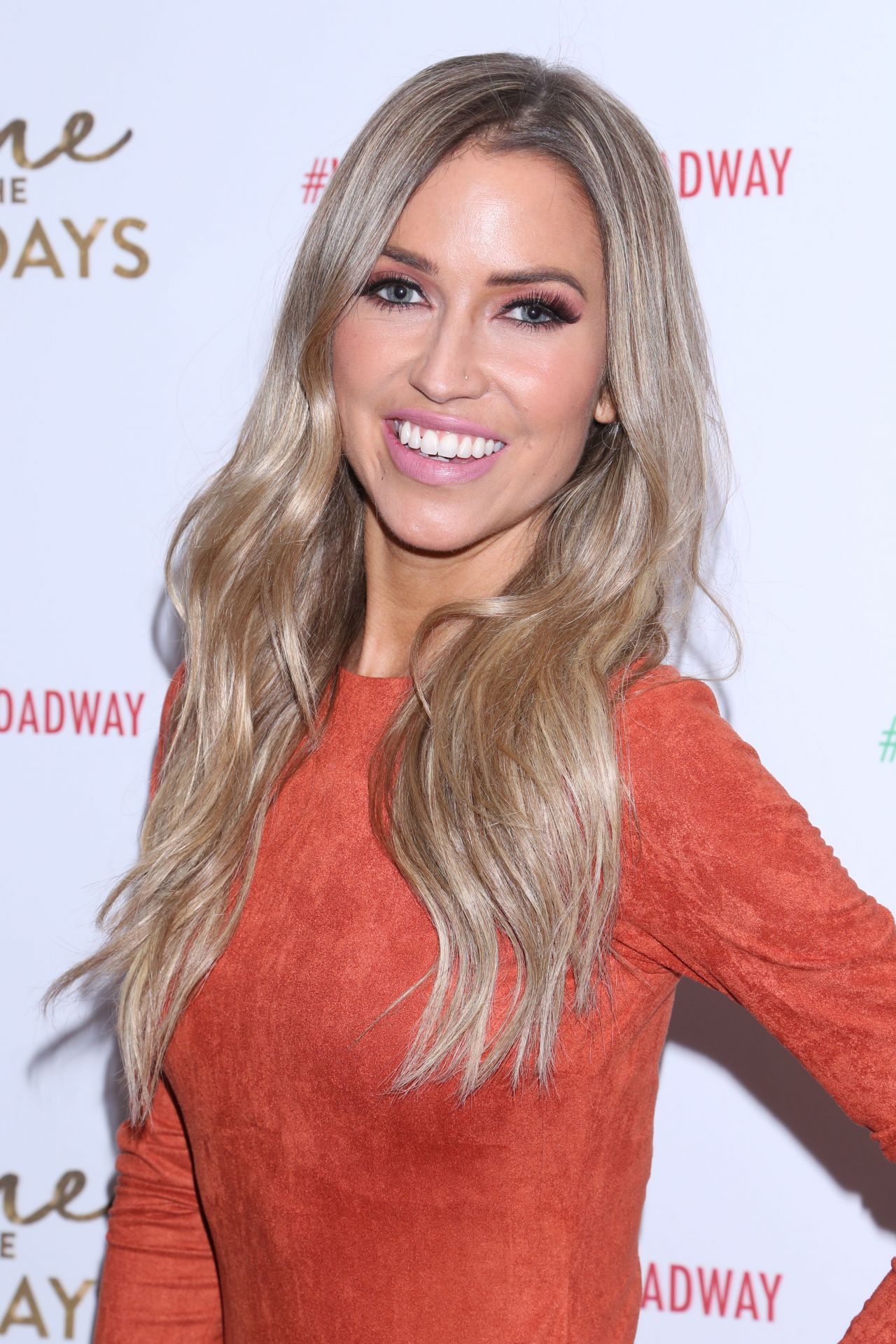
Kaitlyn Bristowe, winner of season 29

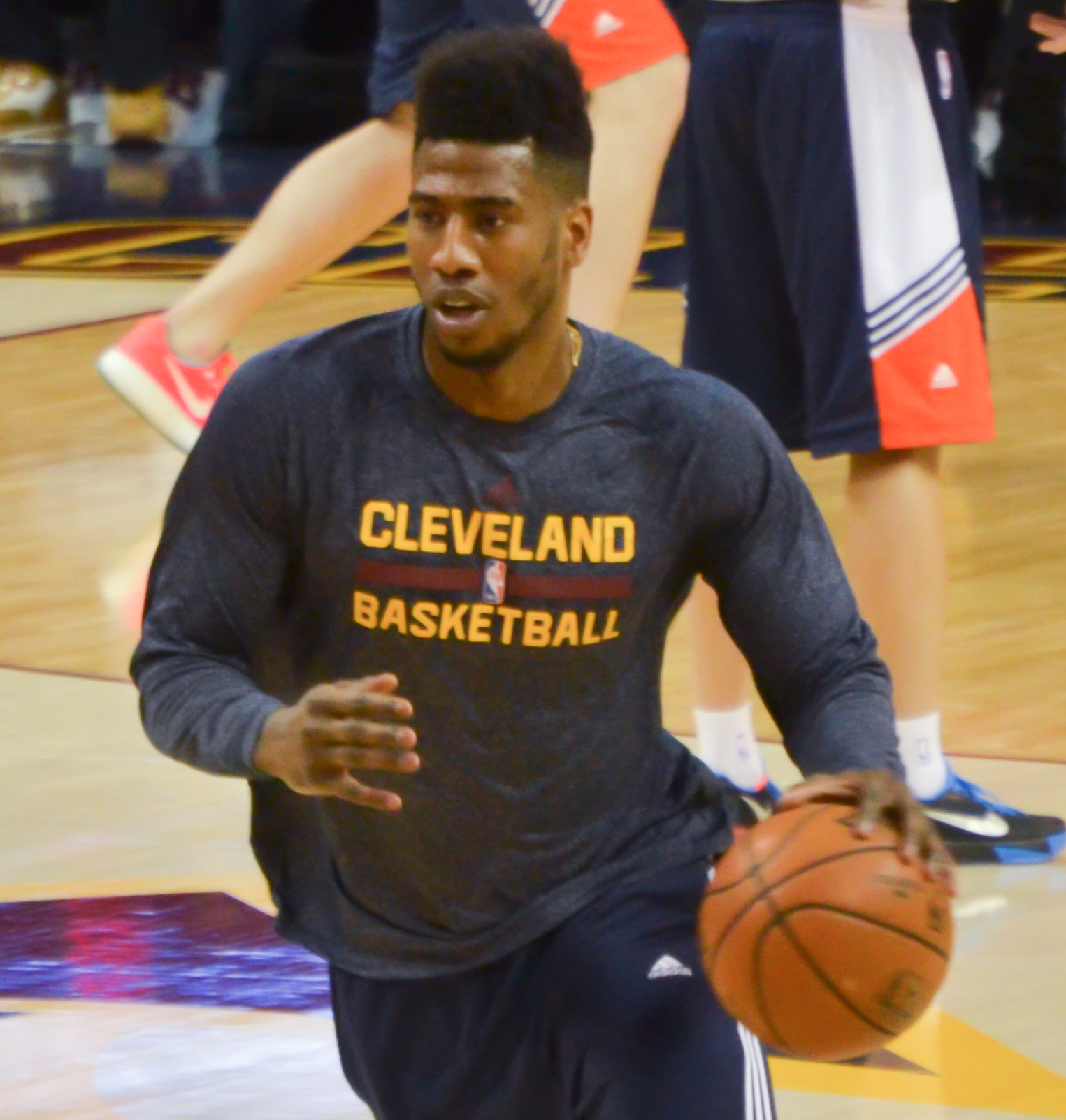
Iman Shumpert, winner of season 30

Celebrity	Notability	Professional partner	Season	Finish
Chaka Khan	Funk & R&B singer	Keo Motsepe	Season 21	13th
Victor Espinoza	Jockey	Karina Smirnoff	Season 21	12th
Kim Zolciak-Biermann	Reality television personality	Tony Dovolani	Season 21	WD
Gary Busey	Film actor	Anna Trebunskaya	Season 21	10th
Paula Deen	Celebrity chef & businesswoman	Louis van Amstel	Season 21	9th
Hayes Grier	Vine & social media personality	Emma Slater	Season 21	8th
Andy Grammer	Singer-songwriter	Allison Holker	Season 21	7th
Alexa PenaVega	Film & television actress	Mark Ballas	Season 21	6th
Tamar Braxton	R&B singer & reality television personality	Valentin Chmerkovskiy	Season 21	WD
Carlos PenaVega	Big Time Rush singer & actor	Witney Carson	Season 21	4th
Alek Skarlatos	Legion of Honor recipient & soldier	Lindsay Arnold	Season 21	3rd
Nick Carter	Backstreet Boys singer	Sharna Burgess	Season 21	2nd
Bindi Irwin	Wildlife conservationist & actress	Derek Hough	Season 21	1st
Geraldo Rivera	Journalist & talk show host	Edyta Śliwińska	Season 22	12th
Mischa Barton	Film & television actress	Artem Chigvintsev	Season 22	11th
Marla Maples	Actress & television personality	Tony Dovolani	Season 22	10th
Doug Flutie	NFL quarterback	Karina Smirnoff	Season 22	9th
Kim Fields	Actress & reality television personality	Sasha Farber	Season 22	7th
Von Miller	NFL linebacker	Witney Carson	Season 22	7th
Jodie Sweetin	Full House actress	Keo Motsepe	Season 22	6th
Antonio Brown	NFL wide receiver	Sharna Burgess	Season 22	4th
Wanyá Morris	Boyz II Men singer	Lindsay Arnold	Season 22	4th
Ginger Zee	Good Morning America meteorologist	Valentin Chmerkovskiy	Season 22	3rd
Paige VanZant	UFC fighter & model	Mark Ballas	Season 22	2nd
Nyle DiMarco	Model & actor	Peta Murgatroyd	Season 22	1st
Jake T. Austin	Actor	Jenna Johnson	Season 23	13th
Rick Perry	Governor of Texas	Emma Slater	Season 23	12th
Babyface	Singer-songwriter & record producer	Allison Holker	Season 23	10th
Vanilla Ice	Rapper & actor	Witney Carson	Season 23	10th
Amber Rose	Model & actress	Maksim Chmerkovskiy	Season 23	9th
Maureen McCormick	Actress & author	Artem Chigvintsev	Season 23	8th
Ryan Lochte	Olympic swimmer	Cheryl Burke	Season 23	7th
Marilu Henner	Actress, broadcaster & author	Derek Hough	Season 23	6th
Terra Jolé	Reality television personality	Sasha Farber	Season 23	5th
Jana Kramer	Country music singer & actress	Gleb Savchenko	Season 23	4th
Calvin Johnson Jr.	NFL wide receiver	Lindsay Arnold	Season 23	3rd
James Hinchcliffe	IndyCar driver	Sharna Burgess	Season 23	2nd
Laurie Hernandez	Olympic artistic gymnast	Valentin Chmerkovskiy	Season 23	1st
Chris Kattan	Actor & comedian	Witney Carson	Season 24	12th
Charo	Actress, comedian & musician	Keo Motsepe	Season 24	11th
Mr. T	Actor & wrestler	Kym Herjavec	Season 24	10th
Erika Jayne	Singer & reality television personality	Gleb Savchenko	Season 24	9th
Heather Morris	Glee actress & dancer	Maksim Chmerkovskiy	Season 24	8th
Nancy Kerrigan	Olympic figure skater	Artem Chigvintsev	Season 24	6th
Nick Viall	The Bachelor star	Peta Murgatroyd	Season 24	6th
Bonner Bolton	Model & bull rider	Sharna Burgess	Season 24	5th
Simone Biles	Olympic artistic gymnast	Sasha Farber	Season 24	4th
Normani	Fifth Harmony singer	Valentin Chmerkovskiy	Season 24	3rd
David Ross	MLB catcher	Lindsay Arnold	Season 24	2nd
Rashad Jennings	NFL running back	Emma Slater	Season 24	1st
Barbara Corcoran	Shark Tank panelist & businesswoman	Keo Motsepe	Season 25	13th
Debbie Gibson	Singer-songwriter & Broadway actress	Alan Bersten	Season 25	12th
Derek Fisher	NBA point guard	Sharna Burgess	Season 25	11th
Sasha Pieterse	Pretty Little Liars actress	Gleb Savchenko	Season 25	10th
Nick Lachey	98 Degrees singer	Peta Murgatroyd	Season 25	9th
Nikki Bella	WWE wrestler	Artem Chigvintsev	Season 25	7th
Vanessa Lachey	Actress & television host	Maksim Chmerkovskiy	Season 25	7th
Terrell Owens	NFL wide receiver	Cheryl Burke	Season 25	6th
Victoria Arlen	Paralympic swimmer & ESPN host	Valentin Chmerkovskiy	Season 25	5th
Drew Scott	Property Brothers co-host	Emma Slater	Season 25	4th
Frankie Muniz	Actor & race car driver	Witney Carson	Season 25	3rd
Lindsey Stirling	Violinist & composer	Mark Ballas	Season 25	2nd
Jordan Fisher	Actor & singer	Lindsay Arnold	Season 25	1st
Jamie Anderson	Olympic snowboarder	Artem Chigvintsev	Season 26	9th
Johnny Damon	MLB outfielder	Emma Slater	Season 26	9th
Kareem Abdul-Jabbar	NBA center	Lindsay Arnold	Season 26	7th
Arike Ogunbowale	Women's basketball player	Gleb Savchenko	Season 26	7th
Jennie Finch Daigle	Olympic softball pitcher	Keo Motsepe	Season 26	4th
Chris Mazdzer	Olympic luger	Witney Carson	Season 26	4th
Mirai Nagasu	Olympic figure skater	Alan Bersten	Season 26	4th
Tonya Harding	Olympic figure skater	Sasha Farber	Season 26	3rd
Josh Norman	NFL cornerback	Sharna Burgess	Season 26	2nd
Adam Rippon	Olympic figure skater	Jenna Johnson	Season 26	1st
Nikki Glaser	Comedian & podcast host	Gleb Savchenko	Season 27	13th
Danelle Umstead	Paralympic alpine skier	Artem Chigvintsev	Season 27	12th
Nancy McKeon	The Facts of Life actress	Valentin Chmerkovskiy	Season 27	11th
Tinashe	Singer-songwriter	Brandon Armstrong	Season 27	10th
Mary Lou Retton	Olympic artistic gymnast	Sasha Farber	Season 27	9th
John Schneider	Actor & country music singer	Emma Slater	Season 27	7th
DeMarcus Ware	NFL linebacker	Lindsay Arnold	Season 27	7th
Joe Amabile	Reality television personality	Jenna Johnson	Season 27	5th
Juan Pablo Di Pace	Fuller House actor	Cheryl Burke	Season 27	5th
Alexis Ren	Model & social media personality	Alan Bersten	Season 27	4th
Evanna Lynch	Harry Potter actress & activist	Keo Motsepe	Season 27	3rd
Milo Manheim	Disney Channel actor	Witney Carson	Season 27	2nd
Bobby Bones	Radio personality	Sharna Burgess	Season 27	1st
Mary Wilson	The Supremes singer	Brandon Armstrong	Season 28	12th
Ray Lewis	NFL linebacker	Cheryl Burke	Season 28	WD
Lamar Odom	NBA forward	Peta Murgatroyd	Season 28	10th
Sailor Brinkley-Cook	Model & daughter of Christie Brinkley	Valentin Chmerkovskiy	Season 28	9th
Karamo Brown	Queer Eye cast member & activist	Jenna Johnson	Season 28	8th
Kate Flannery	The Office actress	Pasha Pashkov	Season 28	7th
Sean Spicer	White House Press Secretary	Lindsay Arnold	Season 28	6th
James Van Der Beek	Dawson's Creek actor	Emma Slater	Season 28	5th
Lauren Alaina	Country singer	Gleb Savchenko	Season 28	4th
Ally Brooke	Fifth Harmony singer	Sasha Farber	Season 28	3rd
Kel Mitchell	Actor & comedian	Witney Carson	Season 28	2nd
Hannah Brown	The Bachelorette star	Alan Bersten	Season 28	1st
Charles Oakley	NBA power forward	Emma Slater	Season 29	15th
Carole Baskin	Tiger King cast member & animal activist	Pasha Pashkov	Season 29	14th
Anne Heche	Film & television actress	Keo Motsepe	Season 29	13th
Jesse Metcalfe	Film & television actor	Sharna Burgess	Season 29	12th
Vernon Davis	NFL tight end	Peta Murgatroyd	Season 29	11th
Monica Aldama	Cheer cast member & coach	Valentin Chmerkovskiy	Season 29	10th
Jeannie Mai	Television host & stylist	Brandon Armstrong	Season 29	WD
Chrishell Stause	Actress & Selling Sunset cast member	Gleb Savchenko	Season 29	8th
AJ McLean	Backstreet Boys singer	Cheryl Burke	Season 29	7th
Johnny Weir	Olympic figure skater	Britt Stewart	Season 29	6th
Skai Jackson	Disney Channel actress	Alan Bersten	Season 29	5th
Justina Machado	Film & television actress	Sasha Farber	Season 29	4th
Nelly	Rapper & singer	Daniella Karagach	Season 29	3rd
Nev Schulman	Catfish host & producer	Jenna Johnson	Season 29	2nd
Kaitlyn Bristowe	The Bachelorette star	Artem Chigvintsev	Season 29	1st
Martin Kove	Film & television actor	Britt Stewart	Season 30	15th
Christine Chiu	Bling Empire cast member	Pasha Pashkov	Season 30	14th
Brian Austin Green	Television actor	Sharna Burgess	Season 30	13th
Matt James	The Bachelor star	Lindsay Arnold	Season 30	12th
Melanie C	Spice Girls singer	Gleb Savchenko	Season 30	11th
Kenya Moore	The Real Housewives of Atlanta cast member	Brandon Armstrong	Season 30	10th
Mike "The Miz" Mizanin	WWE wrestler	Witney Carson	Season 30	9th
Olivia Jade	Social media personality	Valentin Chmerkovskiy	Season 30	8th
Jimmie Allen	Country singer	Emma Slater	Season 30	7th
Melora Hardin	Film & television actress	Artem Chigvintsev	Season 30	6th
Suni Lee	Olympic artistic gymnast	Sasha Farber	Season 30	5th
Amanda Kloots	The Talk co-host	Alan Bersten	Season 30	4th
Cody Rigsby	Peloton instructor & fitness personality	Cheryl Burke	Season 30	3rd
JoJo Siwa	YouTube personality, dancer & singer	Jenna Johnson	Season 30	2nd
Iman Shumpert	NBA shooting guard	Daniella Karagach	Season 30	1st

=== Seasons 31–35 (2022–present) ===
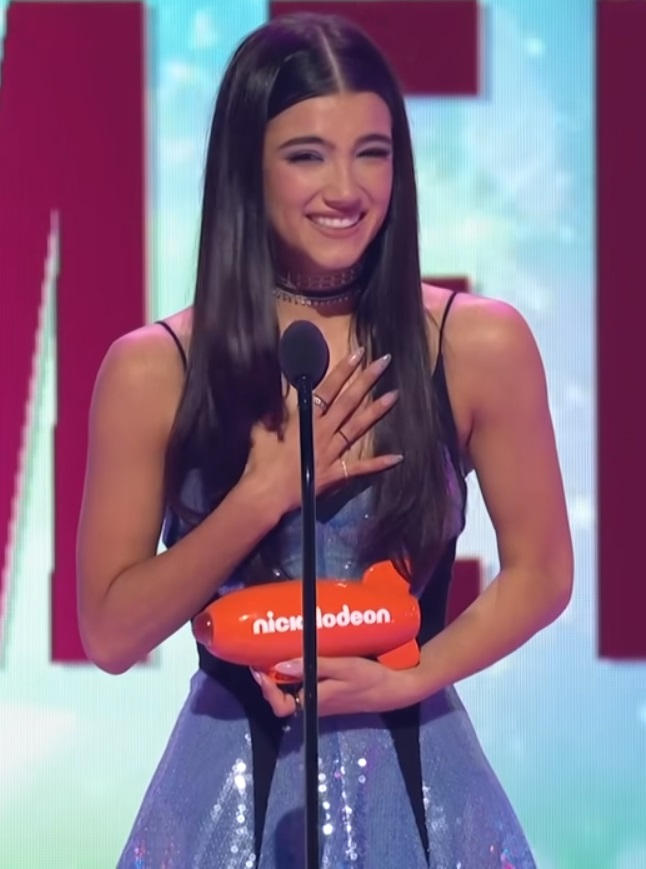
Charli D'Amelio, winner of season 31

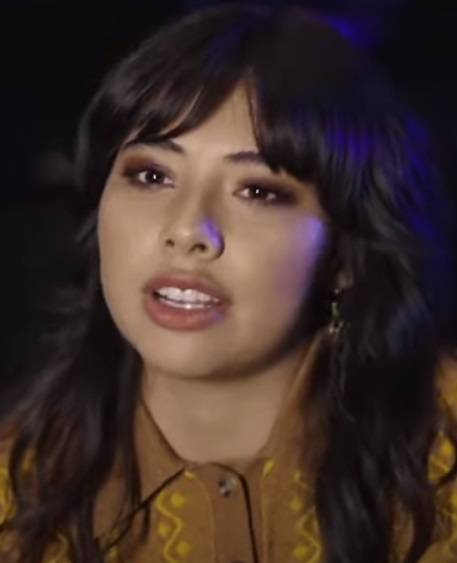
Xochitl Gomez, winner of season 32

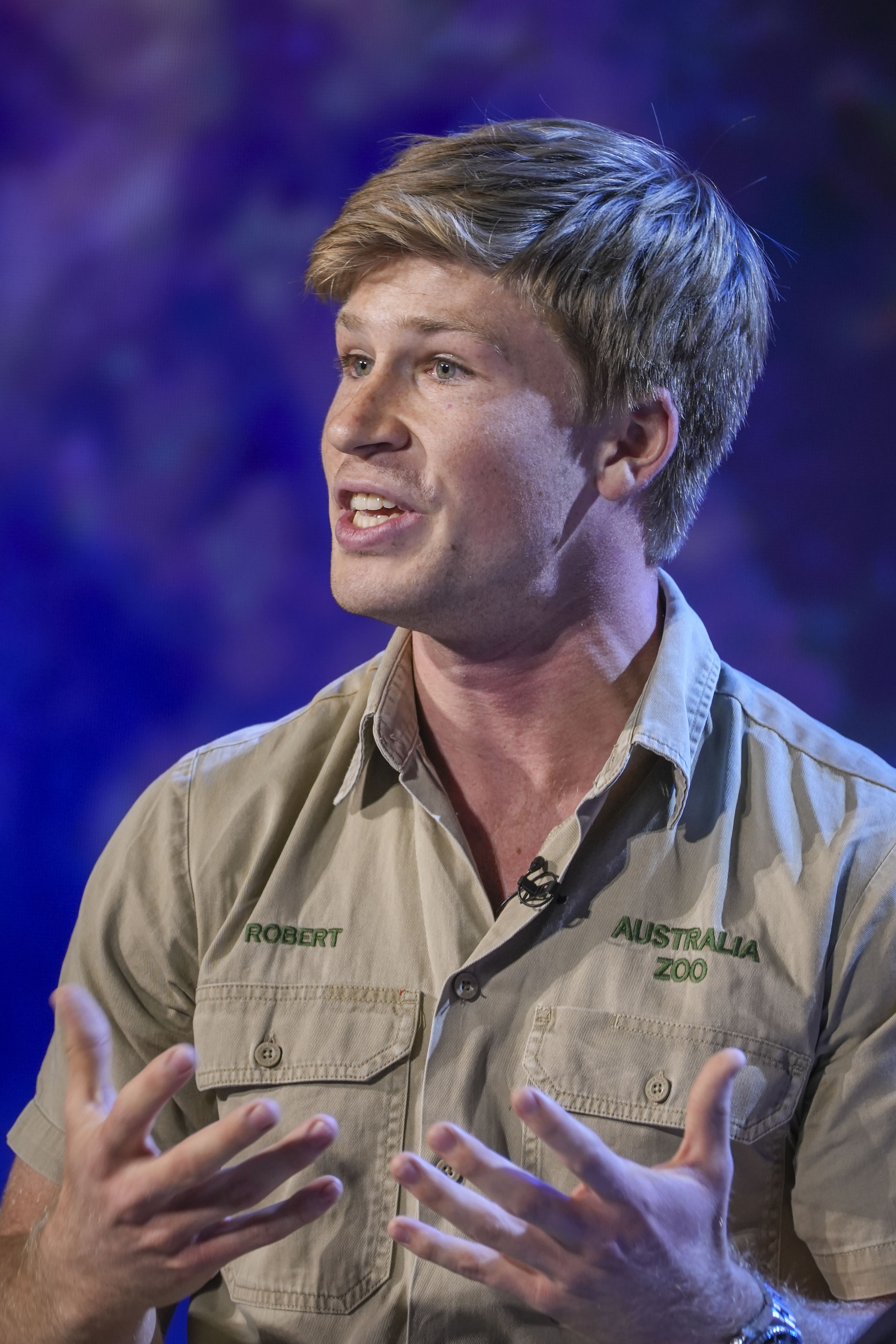
Robert Irwin, winner of season 34

Celebrity	Notability	Professional partner	Season	Finish
Jason Lewis	Sex and the City actor	Peta Murgatroyd	Season 31	16th
Teresa Giudice	The Real Housewives of New Jersey cast member	Pasha Pashkov	Season 31	15th
Cheryl Ladd	Charlie's Angels actress & author	Louis van Amstel	Season 31	14th
Sam Champion	Good Morning America meteorologist	Cheryl Burke	Season 31	13th
Selma Blair	Film & television actress	Sasha Farber	Season 31	WD
Joseph Baena	Professional bodybuilder & actor	Daniella Karagach	Season 31	11th
Jessie James Decker	Country singer	Alan Bersten	Season 31	10th
Jordin Sparks	Singer-songwriter & actress	Brandon Armstrong	Season 31	9th
Heidi D'Amelio	Social media personality	Artem Chigvintsev	Season 31	8th
Vinny Guadagnino	Jersey Shore cast member	Koko Iwasaki	Season 31	7th
Trevor Donovan	Actor & model	Emma Slater	Season 31	6th
Daniel Durant	Film & television actor	Britt Stewart	Season 31	5th
Shangela	Drag queen & RuPaul's Drag Race contestant	Gleb Savchenko	Season 31	4th
Wayne Brady	Comedian, actor & television personality	Witney Carson	Season 31	3rd
Gabby Windey	The Bachelorette star	Valentin Chmerkovskiy	Season 31	2nd
Charli D'Amelio	Social media personality & dancer	Mark Ballas	Season 31	1st
Matt Walsh	Comedian & actor	Koko Iwasaki	Season 32	14th
Jamie Lynn Spears	Zoey 101 actress & singer	Alan Bersten	Season 32	13th
Tyson Beckford	Model & actor	Jenna Johnson	Season 32	12th
Adrian Peterson	NFL running back	Britt Stewart	Season 32	11th
Mira Sorvino	Film & television actress	Gleb Savchenko	Season 32	10th
Mauricio Umansky	The Real Housewives of Beverly Hills cast member	Emma Slater	Season 32	9th
Lele Pons	Social media personality	Brandon Armstrong	Season 32	8th
Barry Williams	The Brady Bunch actor	Peta Murgatroyd	Season 32	7th
Harry Jowsey	Too Hot to Handle contestant	Rylee Arnold	Season 32	6th
Alyson Hannigan	Film & television actress	Sasha Farber	Season 32	5th
Charity Lawson	The Bachelorette star	Artem Chigvintsev	Season 32	4th
Ariana Madix	Vanderpump Rules cast member	Pasha Pashkov	Season 32	3rd
Jason Mraz	Singer-songwriter	Daniella Karagach	Season 32	2nd
Xochitl Gomez	Film & television actress	Valentin Chmerkovskiy	Season 32	1st
Anna Delvey	Con artist	Ezra Sosa	Season 33	12th
Tori Spelling	Film & television actress	Pasha Pashkov	Season 33	12th
Eric Roberts	Film & television actor	Britt Stewart	Season 33	10th
Reginald VelJohnson	Film & television actor	Emma Slater	Season 33	10th
Brooks Nader	Model	Gleb Savchenko	Season 33	9th
Phaedra Parks	Reality television personality	Valentin Chmerkovskiy	Season 33	8th
Jenn Tran	The Bachelorette star	Sasha Farber	Season 33	7th
Dwight Howard	NBA center	Daniella Karagach	Season 33	6th
Danny Amendola	NFL wide receiver	Witney Carson	Season 33	5th
Stephen Nedoroscik	Olympic artistic gymnast	Rylee Arnold	Season 33	4th
Chandler Kinney	Television actress	Brandon Armstrong	Season 33	3rd
Ilona Maher	Olympic rugby player	Alan Bersten	Season 33	2nd
Joey Graziadei	The Bachelor star	Jenna Johnson	Season 33	1st
Baron Davis	NBA point guard	Britt Stewart	Season 34	13th
Corey Feldman	Film actor	Jenna Johnson	Season 34	13th
Lauren Jauregui	Fifth Harmony singer	Brandon Armstrong	Season 34	12th
Hilaria Baldwin	Yoga instructor, podcaster & entrepreneur	Gleb Savchenko	Season 34	11th
Scott Hoying	Pentatonix singer	Rylee Arnold	Season 34	10th
Jen Affleck	The Secret Lives of Mormon Wives cast member	Jan Ravnik	Season 34	9th
Danielle Fishel	Boy Meets World actress	Pasha Pashkov	Season 34	8th
Andy Richter	Actor & comedian	Emma Slater	Season 34	7th
Whitney Leavitt	The Secret Lives of Mormon Wives cast member	Mark Ballas	Season 34	6th
Elaine Hendrix	Film & television actress	Alan Bersten	Season 34	5th
Dylan Efron	Reality television personality	Daniella Karagach	Season 34	4th
Jordan Chiles	Olympic artistic gymnast	Ezra Sosa	Season 34	3rd
Alix Earle	Social media personality	Valentin Chmerkovskiy	Season 34	2nd
Robert Irwin	Wildlife conservationist & television personality	Witney Carson	Season 34	1st
Conner Leavitt	The Secret Lives of Mormon Wives cast member	Adele Zaikman	Season 35	16th
Sarah Jane Nader	Love Thy Nader star	Hailey Bills	Season 35	15th
Giada De Laurentiis	Celebrity chef & entrepreneur	Alan Bersten	Season 35	14th
Taylor Hanson	Hanson frontman	Britt Stewart	Season 35	13th
Ciara Miller	Summer House cast member	Brandon Armstrong	Season 35	12th
Guillermo Rodriguez	Jimmy Kimmel Live! sidekick	Witney Carson	Season 35	11th
Tyler Cameron	The Bachelorette runner-up	Sharna Burgess	Season 35	9th
Jackson Olson	Savannah Bananas second baseman	Emma Slater	Season 35	9th
Julia Stiles	Actress & director	Ezra Sosa	Season 35	8th
Jenna Dewan	Actress & dancer	Valentin Chmerkovskiy	Season 35	7th
Harry Shum Jr.	Actor & dancer	Jenna Johnson	Season 35	6th
Tatyana Ali	Television actress & singer	Jan Ravnik	Season 35	Participating
Ezra Frech	Paralympic track & field athlete	Daniella Karagach	Season 35	Participating
Amber Glenn	Olympic figure skater	Pasha Pashkov	Season 35	Participating
Maura Higgins	Reality television personality	Mark Ballas	Season 35	Participating
Connor Wood	Stand-up comedian & podcaster	Rylee Arnold	Season 35	Participating
