= Maggie Winters =

Maggie Winters may refer to:

- Maggie Winters (comedian), American comedian
- Maggie Winters (TV series), American sitcom television series
