= Maggie Winters (comedian) =

American comedian, actress, and internet personality

- Born: Chicago, Illinois, U.S.
- Occupations: Comedian; actress; podcaster; internet personality
- Years active: 2018–present

Maggie Winters is an American comedian, actress, and internet personality based in Chicago. Known online as @saggiesplinters, she creates character-driven comedy content and performs stand-up. In 2023, she was named a Stand-Up New Face at the Just for Laughs Festival and was included on Vulture's annual "Comedians You Should and Will Know" list. She has a recurring role as Taryn in Season 3 of the HBO series The Righteous Gemstones.

== Early life and education ==
Winters grew up in the Beverly neighborhood on the South Side of Chicago. She attended Mother McAuley Liberal Arts High School and participated in summer programs at the Beverly Arts Center, where she developed an interest in theater. She attended Illinois State University before returning to Chicago to pursue comedy.

Her brothers, Bart and Liam Winters, are members of the Chicago noise rock band Melkbelly.

== Career ==
=== Stand-up and online presence ===
After college, Winters trained in improvisation at The Second City and iO Chicago for approximately five years. In 2019, she enrolled in FemCom, a stand-up comedy course for women taught by Alex Kumin at the Lincoln Lodge in Chicago, which she has credited with giving her the confidence to pursue stand-up. During the COVID-19 pandemic, she began creating character-driven comedy videos online, building a following under the handle @saggiesplinters on TikTok and Instagram.

In a 2023 interview with Block Club Chicago, Winters described her comedy as rooted in personal experience and Chicago culture, noting that she frequently collaborates with her brothers on characters and material.

=== Marguerite ===
In March 2023, Winters debuted her solo show Marguerite at Sleeping Village in Chicago, performing to sold-out audiences. The show was directed by her brothers Bart and Liam Winters.

In the summer of 2024, Winters performed Marguerite in a monthlong run at the Edinburgh Festival Fringe, appearing at the Pleasance Dome. The show received mixed reviews. Broadway Baby gave it four stars, calling Winters "one to watch", while Chortle described her as "engaging and likeable" but found the show's content lacking substance, and Fest gave it two stars, calling it "an earnest yet disjointed performance".

=== Television ===
In 2023, Winters appeared in a recurring role as Taryn in Season 3 of The Righteous Gemstones, an HBO comedy-drama created by Danny McBride, appearing opposite Adam DeVine and Tony Cavalero.

=== Touring ===
Winters has toured as a featured performer on comedian Connor Wood's Fibs & Friends tour, which Deadline reported had sold over 34,500 tickets across more than 100 shows nationwide.
