= Brooke Averick =

American internet personality, podcaster, and author

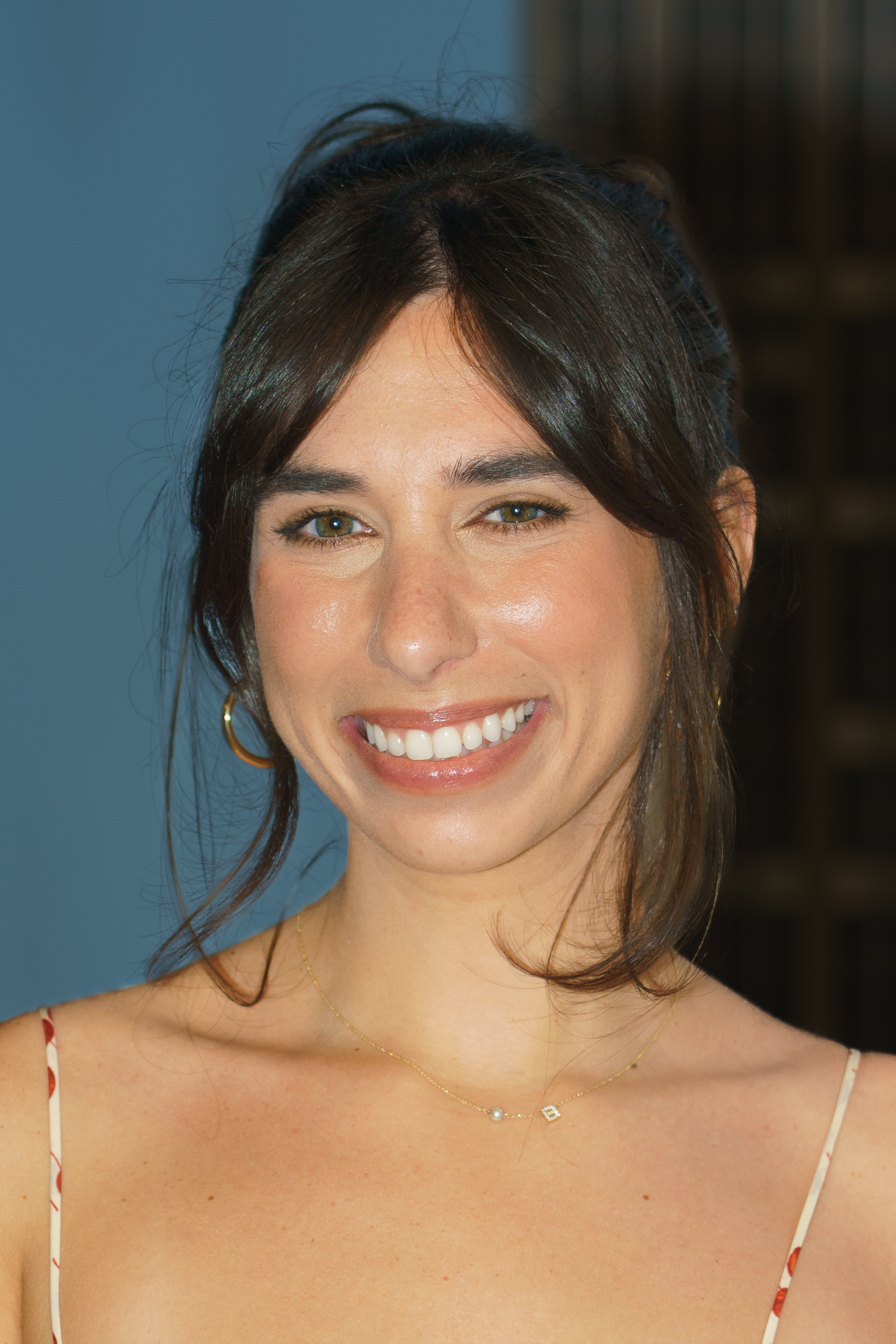
- Born: June 18, 1996 (age 30); Main Line, Pennsylvania, U.S.
- Other name: LadyEfron
- Occupations: Internet personality; podcaster; author
- Years active: 2020-present

Brooke Averick (born June 18, 1996), also known online as LadyEfron, is an American internet personality, podcaster, and author based in Los Angeles. She co-hosts Brooke and Connor Make a Podcast with Connor Wood on TMG Studios and formerly hosted the solo podcast Obsessed with Brooke Averick. Her debut novel, Phoebe Berman's Gonna Lose It, was published by Crown in May 2026 as part of a multi-book deal. It debuted at #2 on the New York Times Best Sellers list.

== Early life and education ==
Averick grew up in the Main Line area of suburban Philadelphia. She attended Boston University, where she earned a degree in early childhood education, and subsequently worked as a preschool teacher in Pennsylvania.

== Career ==
=== Social media ===
In April 2020, during the COVID-19 pandemic, Averick began posting comedy videos on TikTok under the handle @ladyefron, a childhood screen name inspired by her admiration for actor Zac Efron. Her first video, in which she read from her childhood diary, went viral, and she left her teaching job shortly afterward. Later that year, Paper magazine named Averick one of its 20 "Paper People" of 2020, a list focused on notable TikTok creators.

In 2021, Averick moved to Los Angeles and briefly lived in Common Room L.A., a TikTok content house, which disbanded after several months.

=== Podcasting ===
In early 2022, Averick and fellow internet personality Connor Wood, a former housemate from Common Room L.A., launched Brooke and Connor Make a Podcast, a weekly pop-culture and comedy podcast produced by TMG Studios, the podcast network co-founded by Cody Ko and Noel Miller. The show was part of a slate of seven podcasts at the network.

In January 2024, Averick launched a solo podcast on TMG Studios titled Obsessed with Brooke Averick, in which she explores personal fandoms and pop-culture fixations. The premiere episode featured fellow internet personality Brittany Broski as a guest.

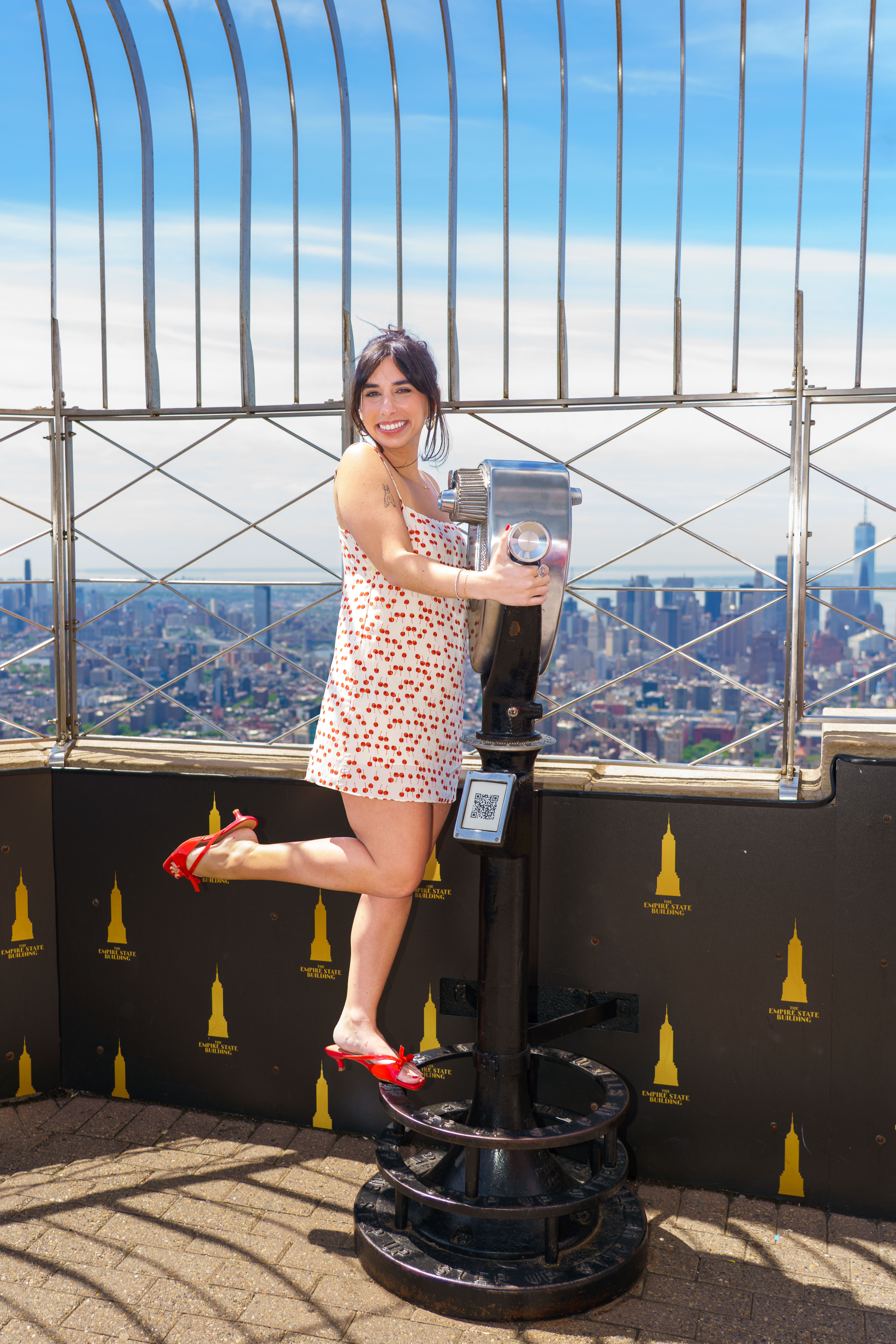
Averick at the Empire State Building May 2026

=== Writing ===
Averick's debut novel, Phoebe Berman's Gonna Lose It, a romantic comedy about a woman navigating intimacy anxiety, was published by Crown, an imprint of Penguin Random House, on May 26, 2026. The book is part of a multi-book deal with Crown. Netflix has reportedly acquired film rights to the novel, adapting it as a romantic comedy with Averick executive producing.
