= Rylee Arnold =

American dancer (born 2005)

- Arnold in 2026
- Born: June 5, 2005 (age 21); Provo, Utah, U.S.
- Education: Timpview High School
- Occupations: Dancer; choreographer; media personality
- Years active: 2014–present
- Television: Dancing with the Stars; Dancing with the Stars: Juniors
- Relatives: Lindsay Arnold (sister)

Instagram information
- Page: ryleearnold1
- Followers: 1.4 million (Jan 10, 2025)

TikTok information
- Page: ryleearnold
- Followers: 1.8 million (June 5, 2026)

Rylee Arnold (born June 5, 2005) is an American Latin and ballroom dancer. She first gained recognition for her appearances on the children's television series Dancing with the Stars: Juniors (2018), where she finished as a runner-up with actor Miles Brown. After the program was cancelled, Arnold joined the main competition series in 2023.

== Early life ==
Rylee Arnold was born on June 5, 2005, in Provo, Utah. She is the youngest daughter of Melinda "Mindy" Arnold (née Peay), a physical therapist, and Joshua Arnold, a physician assistant and former defensive back for the BYU Cougars. She was raised Mormon with her three older sisters: Lindsay, Jensen, and Brynley.

Arnold was inspired to follow in the footsteps of her eldest sister, Lindsay, after watching her perform on the reality competition series Dancing with the Stars. She graduated from Timpview High School in May 2023.

== Career ==
Arnold began training and competing in ballroom dance competitions at a young age. When she was nine, she placed third at the 2014 World DanceSport Championships in Paris. She ranked fifth at the 2019 WDC World Championships in Dublin.

=== Dancing with the Stars: Juniors ===
On August 1, 2018, Arnold was announced as a professional dancer for the children's competition series Dancing with the Stars: Juniors; a spin-off of the main celebrity talent show franchise. She was paired with actor Miles Brown under the mentorship of her sister, Lindsay Arnold. The couple made it to the finals and finished as one of three runners-up; tying with Ariana Greenblatt and Artyon Celestine (with mentor Brandon Armstrong) and Mackenzie Ziegler and Sage Rosen (with mentor Gleb Savchenko).

| Week | Dance | Music | Judges' scores (Note: Individual judges' scores are listed in the following order: Mandy Moore, Valentin Chmerkovskiy, Adam Rippon.) | | | Total score | Result |
|---|---|---|---|---|---|---|---|
| 1 | Salsa | "Who Let the Dogs Out" — Baha Men | 7 | 8 | 7 | 22 | Safe |
| 2 | Argentine tango | "I Don't Want to Be" — Gavin DeGraw | 8 | 8 | 8 | 24 | Safe |
| 3 | Charleston | "One Jump Ahead" (from Aladdin) | 9 | 9 | 9 | 27 | Safe |
| 4 | Samba | "I Want Candy" — The Strangeloves | 9 | 9 | 9 | 27 | Safe |
| 5 | Jazz | "Space Jam" — Quad City DJ's | 9 | 9 | 9 | 27 | Safe |
| 6 | Foxtrot | "Ain't No Mountain High Enough" — Marvin Gaye | 9 | 9 | 8 | 26 | Safe |
| 7 | Jive | "Rock Around the Clock" — Bill Haley & His Comets | 9 | 9 | 10 | 28 | Safe |
| 8 (Semifinals) | Cha-cha-cha | "Shake Señora" — Pitbull feat. T-Pain & Sean Paul | 9 | 10 | 9 | 28 | Safe |
| 8 (Semifinals) | Jazz & Samba (Team fusion) | "Party in the U.S.A." — Miley Cyrus | 10 | 10 | 10 | 30 | Safe |
| 9 (Finals) | Salsa | "Who Let the Dogs Out" — Baha Men | 10 | 9 | 9 | 28 | Runners-up |
| 9 (Finals) | Freestyle | "Sleigh Ride" — District 78 | 10 | 10 | 10 | 30 | Runners-up |

=== Dancing with the Stars ===
Arnold was the first pro from Dancing with the Stars: Juniors to be cast in the main competition series following its cancellation. She was announced as a professional dancer for season 32 and was partnered with media personality Harry Jowsey. Despite consistently earning low scores and criticism from the judges, audience voters allowed the couple to stay in the competition until they were eliminated during the quarterfinals on November 21, 2023, finishing in sixth place.

For season 33, Arnold was paired with Olympic artistic gymnast Stephen Nedoroscik. They reached the finals and finished in fourth place on November 26, 2024, making Arnold the first Dancing with the Stars pro born in the 21st century to advance to the finale. Arnold and Nedoroscik's contemporary-based freestyle routine to Coldplay's "Viva la Vida" was acclaimed by critics and viewers. Rebecca Iannucci from TVLine named it the best dance number of the year.

For season 34, Arnold was paired with Scott Hoying of the a cappella group Pentatonix. They were eliminated during the sixth week of competition on October 21, 2025, finishing in tenth place; Arnold's lowest placement to date.

For season 35, she is paired with stand-up comedian and podcaster Connor Wood.

| Season | Partner | Place |
|---|---|---|
| 32 | Harry Jowsey | 6th |
| 33 | Stephen Nedoroscik | 4th |
| 34 | Scott Hoying | 10th |
| 35 | Connor Wood | TBD |

==== Season 32 ====
Celebrity partner: Harry Jowsey

| Week | Dance | Music | Judges' scores (Note: Individual judges' scores are listed in the following order: Carrie Ann Inaba, Derek Hough, Bruno Tonioli.) | | | Total score | Result |
|---|---|---|---|---|---|---|---|
| 1 | Cha-cha-cha | "Rock Your Body" — Justin Timberlake | 4 | 4 | 4 | 12 | Safe |
| 2 | Salsa | "Arranca" — Becky G, feat. Omega | 5 | 5 | 5 | 15 | Safe |
| 3 | Foxtrot | "Easy" — Commodores | 6 | 5 | 6 | 24 (Note: Harry and Rylee also received a score of 7 from guest judge Michael Strahan.) | Safe |
| 4 | Quickstep | "You've Got a Friend in Me" (from Toy Story) | 7 | 7 | 7 | 21 | Safe |
| 5 | Contemporary | "Keep Your Head Up" — Andy Grammer | 6 | 6 | 6 | 18 | Safe |
| 6 | Argentine tango | "Blinding Lights" — District 78 | 7 | 7 | 7 | 28 (Note: Harry and Rylee also received a score of 7 from guest judge Niecy Nash-Betts.) | Safe |
| 6 | Hustle & Charleston; Marathon | "Stayin' Alive" — Bee Gees & "Grim Grinning Ghosts" — Kris Bowers | —N/a | | | 1 (Note: Harry and Rylee received one bonus point in this dance marathon.) | Safe |
| 7 | Jazz | "It's Gonna Be Me" — NSYNC | 6 | 6 (Note: Harry and Rylee also received a score of 6 from guest judge Paula Abdul.) | 6 | 64 | Safe |
| 7 | Freestyle (Team Young'n Style) | "Gangnam Style" — Psy | 10 | 10 (Note: This team also received a score of 10 from guest judge Paula Abdul.) | 10 | 64 | Safe |
| 8 | Viennese waltz | "I Have Nothing" — Whitney Houston | 7 | 7 | 7 | 28 (Note: Harry and Rylee also received a score of 7 from guest judge Billy Porter.) | Safe |
| 8 | Rumba (Dance-off) | "One Moment in Time" — Whitney Houston | Loser | | | 0 (Note: Harry and Rylee received zero bonus points for losing this dance-off.) | Safe |
| 9 (Quarterfinals) | Rumba | "August" — Taylor Swift | 8 | 7 | 7 | 30 (Note: Harry and Rylee also received a score of 8 from guest judge Mandy Moore.) | Eliminated |
| 9 (Quarterfinals) | Jive (Dance relay) | "Shake It Off" — Taylor Swift | Loser | | | 0 (Note: Harry and Rylee received zero bonus points for losing this dance relay.) | Eliminated |

==== Season 33 ====
Celebrity partner: Stephen Nedoroscik

| Week | Dance | Music | Judges' scores (Note: Individual judges' scores are listed in the following order: Carrie Ann Inaba, Derek Hough, Bruno Tonioli.) | | | Total score | Result |
|---|---|---|---|---|---|---|---|
| 1 | Jive | "Don't Stop Me Now" — Queen | 7 | 7 | 7 | 21 | Safe |
| 2 | Paso doble | "Superman — Main Theme" (from Superman) | 8 | 7 | 7 | 22 | Safe |
| 3 | Quickstep | "Superstition" — Stevie Wonder | 8 | 7 | 7 | 30 (Note: Stephen and Rylee also received a score of 8 from guest judge Rosie Perez.) | Safe |
| 3 | Foxtrot | "Here I Go Again" — Whitesnake | 8 | 8 | 8 | 32 (Note: Stephen and Rylee also received a score of 8 from guest judge Gene Simmons.) | Safe |
| 4 | Argentine tango | "Seven Nation Army" — The White Stripes | 8 | 9 | 8 | 33 (Note: Stephen and Rylee also received a score of 8 from guest judge Mark Ballas.) | Safe |
| 5 | Charleston | "A Star Is Born" (from Hercules) | 8 | 8 | 8 | 48 | Safe |
| 5 | Freestyle (Team Roar) | "I Just Can't Wait to Be King" (from The Lion King) | 8 | 8 | 8 | 48 | Safe |
| 6 | Contemporary | "I Ran (So Far Away)" — Hidden Citizens | 10 | 9 | 9 | 28 | Safe |
| 6 | Salsa (Dance-off) | "Jump in the Line" — Harry Belafonte | Loser | | | 0 (Note: Stephen and Rylee received zero bonus points for losing this dance-off.) | Safe |
| 7 (Quarterfinals) | Viennese waltz | "Glimpse of Us" — Joji | 10 | 10 | 9 | 54 | Safe |
| 7 (Quarterfinals) | Jive (Instant Dance) | "Love Is Embarrassing" — Olivia Rodrigo | 9 | 8 | 8 | 54 | Safe |
| 8 (Semifinals) | Cha-cha-cha | "Bailar" — Deorro feat. Elvis Crespo | 8 | 8 | 9 | 53 | Safe |
| 8 (Semifinals) | Tango | "Sweet Disposition" — The Temper Trap | 10 | 9 | 9 | 53 | Safe |
| 9 (Finals) | Quickstep (Redemption Dance) | "I'll Be There for You" (from Friends) | 10 | 9 | 10 | 59 | Fourth place |
| 9 (Finals) | Freestyle | "Viva la Vida" — Coldplay | 10 | 10 | 10 | 59 | Fourth place |

==== Season 34 ====
Celebrity partner: Scott Hoying

| Week | Dance | Music | Judges' scores (Note: Individual judges' scores are listed in the following order: Carrie Ann Inaba, Derek Hough, Bruno Tonioli.) | | | Total score | Result |
|---|---|---|---|---|---|---|---|
| 1 | Tango | "Abracadaba" — Lady Gaga | —N/a | 5 | 5 | 10 (Note: Scott and Rylee only received two judges's scores, as Carrie Ann Inaba was absent.) | Safe |
| 2 | Cha-cha-cha | "Blue (Da Ba Dee)" — Eiffel 65 | 6 | 6 | 6 | 18 | Safe |
| 3 | Jazz | "Like Jennie" — Jennie | 8 | 7 | 7 | 22 | Safe |
| 4 | Salsa | "Bop to the Top" (from High School Musical) | 7 | 7 | 7 | 21 | Safe |
| 5 | Foxtrot | "Parallel" — Scott Hoying | 7 | 8 | 8 | 30 (Note: Scott and Rylee also received a score of 7 from guest judge Kym Johnson.) | Safe |
| 6 | Contemporary | "The Wizard and I" — Cynthia Erivo feat. Michelle Yeoh | 7 | 7 | 7 | 28 (Note: Scott and Rylee also received a score of 7 from guest judge Jon M. Chu.) | Eliminated |

==== Season 35 ====
Celebrity partner: Connor Wood

| Week | Dance | Music | Judges' scores (Note: Individual judges' scores are listed in the following order: Carrie Ann Inaba, Derek Hough, Bruno Tonioli.) | | | Total score | Result |
|---|---|---|---|---|---|---|---|
| 1 | Cha-cha-cha | "I Like It, I Love It" — Tim McGraw | 6 | 5 | 5 | 16 | Safe |
| 2 | Tango | "12 to 12" — sombr | 5 | 5 | 5 | 15 | Safe |
| 3 | Foxtrot | “Everywhere” — Fleetwood Mac | 7 | 6 | 7 | 20 | Safe |
| 4 | Rumba | "Touch My Body" — Mariah Carey | 6 | 6 | 7 | 19 | Safe |
| 5 | Samba | "Hips Don't Lie" — Shakira feat. Wyclef Jean | 6 | 6 | 6 | 25 (Note: Connor and Rylee also received a score of 7 from guest judge Joe Buck.) | Safe |
| 6 | Viennese waltz | "Piano Man" — Billy Joel | 8 | 8 | 8 | 32 (Note: Connor and Rylee also received a score of 8 from guest judge Kym Johnson.) | Safe |
| 7 | Contemporary | "You Are My Sunshine" — Charles McDonald | 10 | 10 | 9 | 37 (Note: Connor and Rylee also received a score of 8 from guest judge Shirley Ballas.) | Safe |
| 8 | Waltz | "I See the Light" from Tangled | 8 | 8 | 8 | 37 (Note: Connor and Rylee also received a score of 8 from guest judge Cynthia Erivo.) | Safe |
| 8 | Freestyle (Team Dance) | "We're All in This Together" from High School Musical on Stage! | 10 | 10 | 10 | 40 | Safe |
| 9 | Argentine Tango | "SexyBack" — Justin Timberlake feat. Timbaland | 9 | 9 | 9 | 27 | Safe |
| 9 | Cha-cha-cha (Dance Off) | "All I Wanna Do" — Sheryl Crow | Loser | | | 0 | Safe |
| 10 | Jive | "Blue Suede Shoes" — Elvis Presley | 8 | 8 | 8 | 24 | Safe |
| 10 | Quickstep | "Dance, Dance" — Fall Out Boy | 8 | 8 | 8 | 24 | Safe |

== Reception ==
Arnold has been credited with "revitalizing" Dancing with the Stars by utilizing social media platforms such as Instagram and TikTok to generate audience engagement. Conrad Green, its showrunner, noted that Arnold's ability to draw her own audience, especially among Generation Z, has turned her into a social media consultant to other celebrities and pros.

== Personal life ==
Arnold is a member of the Church of Jesus Christ of Latter-day Saints. In order to compete on Dancing with the Stars, she splits her time between Utah and Los Angeles. She was diagnosed with type 1 diabetes when she was 15 years of age, after nearly falling into a diabetic coma. Arnold began dating American football player Walker Lyons on October 20, 2024.

Awards and achievements}
| Preceded by Charity Lawson & Artem Chigvintsev | Dancing with the Stars (US) fourth place contestant Season 33 (Fall 2024 with Stephen Nedoroscik) | Succeeded by Dylan Efron & Daniella Karagach |
| Preceded by N/A | Dancing with the Stars: Juniors (US) runner-up Season 1 (Fall 2018 with Miles Brown & Lindsay Arnold) | Succeeded by N/A |
