= Connor Wood (comedian) =

American stand-up comedian and podcaster

- Born: Connor Masich; September 11, 1995 (age 31); Austin, Texas, U.S.
- Other name: Fibula
- Education: University of Texas at Austin
- Occupations: Comedian; podcaster
- Years active: 2020–present

Connor Wood (born Connor Masich), also known online as Fibula, is an American stand-up comedian and podcaster. He gained a following on TikTok during the COVID-19 pandemic with comedy videos about unemployment and everyday life, and has since transitioned to live stand-up. He co-hosts Brooke and Connor Make a Podcast with Brooke Averick, which was named Best Comedy Podcast of 2024 by Adweek.

== Early life and education ==
Wood grew up in Austin, Texas, in a military family and moved frequently during childhood. He attended the University of Texas at Austin, where he studied advertising. After graduating, he moved to Los Angeles and worked in marketing for the dating app Bumble and the scooter company Bird.

== Career ==
=== Social media beginnings ===
After being laid off at the onset of the COVID-19 pandemic in 2020, Wood began posting videos on TikTok about his experiences with unemployment and everyday life. His relatable, off-the-cuff style attracted a predominantly female audience, a dynamic he has described as unintentional. He has amassed over 900,000 followers on TikTok.

=== Podcast ===
In January 2022, Wood and fellow content creator Brooke Averick launched Brooke and Connor Make a Podcast, distributed through TMG Studios, the podcast network founded by Cody Ko and Noel Miller. The podcast, in which the co-hosts discuss pop culture and share personal anecdotes, reached number one on Spotify's comedy podcast chart. Adweek named it Best Comedy Podcast of 2024, and Variety included Wood and Averick in its 2025 Comedy Impact Report.

=== Stand-up comedy ===
Wood began performing stand-up in 2023 with a show called Fibs & Friends. He was named a Comic to Watch at the 2023 New York Comedy Festival, where he performed sold-out shows at the Gramercy Theatre. In December 2023, he announced his first nationwide Fibs & Friends tour, initially covering 11 cities beginning in February 2024. The tour sold out over 70 shows during its first year, including dates in London and Dublin. In July 2025, Deadline reported that Wood had sold 34,500 tickets across 103 shows and was extending the tour with dates in 12 additional cities through 2026.

Wood has shared the stage with comedians Tiffany Haddish and Bill Burr, and appeared as a special guest on Jake Shane's Live With Jake Shane tour, including a show at Radio City Music Hall in June 2025. He is represented by UTA, Framework Entertainment, and Yorn, Levine, Barnes.

Wood is a celebrity contestant on Season 35 of Dancing with the Stars on ABC and has made it to the finals. His partner is professional dancer Rylee Arnold.

== Personal life ==
In 2024, Wood was charged and convicted of driving under the influence of alcohol. Wood relocated from Los Angeles to New York City in early 2025.
