= Dancing with the Stars: Juniors =

2018 American television series

- Genre: Reality competition
- Based on: Dancing with the Stars
- Presented by: Jordan Fisher; Frankie Muniz
- Judges: Valentin Chmerkovskiy; Mandy Moore; Adam Rippon
- Narrated by: Alan Dedicoat
- Country of origin: United States
- Original language: English
- No. of seasons: 1
- No. of episodes: 9

Production
- Executive producers: Andrew Llinares; Ashley Edens-Shaffer
- Production locations: CBS Television City; Los Angeles, California
- Running time: 40–86 minutes
- Production company: BBC Studios

Original release
- Network: ABC
- Release: October 7 – December 9, 2018

Related
- Dancing with the Stars

Dancing with the Stars: Juniors is an American children's dance competition television series that premiered on October 7, 2018, on ABC. It was a spin-off of the Dancing with the Stars series, which is based on the British reality TV competition Strictly Come Dancing. The format of the show featured celebrity children (either in their own right or having celebrity parentage) paired with professional junior ballroom dancers and mentored by an adult professional dancer. The couples competed against each other by performing choreographed dance routines in front of a panel of judges. In September 2019, ABC cancelled the series after one season.

== Format ==
Like Dancing with the Stars, the scores used for eliminations were based 50% on the judges' scores and 50% on audience voting. Unlike the parent series, only studio audience members who are not family members during each week's episode were able to vote; there is no at-home voting. The team with the lowest total score after combining votes and judges' scores is eliminated.

== Cast ==
=== Couples and mentors ===
On August 1, 2018, the junior professional dancers and adult mentors were revealed. On September 25, during the second episode of season 27 of Dancing with the Stars, the junior celebrities were announced.

Cast of Dancing with the Stars: Juniors
Celebrity	Notability	Professional partner	Coach	Status	Ref.
Tripp Johnston Palin	Son of Bristol Palin & grandson of Sarah Palin	Hailey Bills	Jenna Johnson	Eliminated 1st on October 7, 2018	
Addison Osta Smith	MasterChef Junior winner	Lev Cameron Khmelev	Keo Motsepe	Eliminated 1st on October 7, 2018	
Hudson West	General Hospital actor	Kameron Couch	Hayley Erbert	Eliminated 3rd on October 14, 2018	
Sophia Pippen	Daughter of Scottie & Larsa Pippen	Jake Monreal	Sasha Farber	Eliminated 4th on October 21, 2018	
Alana "Honey Boo Boo" Thompson	Here Comes Honey Boo Boo star	Tristan Ianiero	Artem Chigvintsev	Eliminated 5th on October 28, 2018	
Jason Maybaum	Raven's Home & Freaky Friday actor	Elliana Walmsley	Emma Slater	Eliminated 6th on November 11, 2018	
Akash Vukoti	Scripps National Spelling Bee participant	Kamri Peterson	Witney Carson	Eliminated 7th on November 18, 2018	
Mandla Morris	Son of Stevie Wonder & fashion designer	Brightyn Brems	Cheryl Burke	Eliminated 8th on November 25, 2018	
Miles Brown	Black-ish actor	Rylee Arnold	Lindsay Arnold	Runners-up on December 9, 2018	
Ariana Greenblatt	Stuck in the Middle actress	Artyon Celestine	Brandon Armstrong	Runners-up on December 9, 2018	
Mackenzie Ziegler	Dance Moms alum, singer & actress	Sage Rosen	Gleb Savchenko	Runners-up on December 9, 2018	
Sky Brown	Professional skateboarder	JT Church	Alan Bersten	Winners on December 9, 2018	

=== Hosts and judges ===
Dancing with the Stars season 25 winner Jordan Fisher and finalist Frankie Muniz served as the hosts. Two-time professional champion Valentin Chmerkovskiy, Emmy winning choreographer Mandy Moore, and season 26 celebrity champion Adam Rippon served as the judges.

=== Dance troupe ===
The Dancing with the Stars: Juniors troupe consisted of Makeila Lawrence, Cody Bingham, Reese Hatala, Sebastian Jozuka, and Daniel Novikov. They were mentored by Dancing with the Stars troupe member Morgan Larson.

=== Future appearances ===
Rylee Arnold became a professional dancer on season 32 of Dancing with the Stars.

Hailey Bills became a professional dancer as a member of the troupe on season 34., then promoted to a professional dancer on the main cast for season 35.

Jake Monreal competed on Dancing with the Stars: The Next Pro.

Kamri Peterson was announced as a first-time troupe member for season 35 on August 2, 2026, during the series' inaugural fan convention.

== Episodes ==
No.	Title	Rating (18–49)	Original release date	U.S. viewers (millions)
1	"Premiere"	0.7/3	October 7, 2018	5.03
2	"Song From The Year I Was Born"	0.8/3	October 14, 2018	4.66
3	"Disney Night"	0.8/3	October 21, 2018	4.87
4	"Halloween Night"	0.7/3	October 28, 2018	4.06
5	"Juniors Choice"	0.6/3	November 11, 2018	4.02
6	"Giving Thanks"	0.7/3	November 18, 2018	4.28
7	"Time Machine"	0.6/3	November 25, 2018	4.03
8	"The Semi-Finals"	0.6/3	December 2, 2018	3.81
9	"The Finale (Holiday Special)"	0.6/3	December 9, 2018	4.12

== Scoring charts ==
The highest score each week is indicated in bold green with a dagger (†). The lowest score each week is indicated in italicized red with a double-dagger (‡).

Couple	Place	1	2	3	4	5	6	7	8	9	8+9
Sky & JT	1	22	22	24	26	23	**29**†	27	29+28=57	30+30=**60**†	117 (Note: This couple finished in first place.)
Miles & Rylee	2	22	**24**†	**27**†	**27**†	27	26	**28**†	28+30=58	28+30=58‡	116 (Note: This couple finished in second place.)
Ariana & Artyon	2	**24**†	**24**†	25	22	**28**†	27	27	28+28=56‡	30+28=58‡	114‡
Mackenzie & Sage	2	22	**24**†	**27**†	25	27	27	26	30+30=**60**†	28+30=58‡	**118**†
Mandla & Brightyn	5	**24**†	22	21	23	25	27	24‡ (Note: This couple was eliminated.)			
Akash & Kamri	6	21	21	21	21‡	20‡	23‡				
Jason & Elliana	7	18	21	22	25	25					
Honey Boo Boo & Tristan	8	19	19‡	21	21‡						
Sophia & Jake	9	21	20	19‡							
Hudson & Kameron	10	22	22								
Tripp & Hailey	11	17									
Addison & Lev	11	15‡									

== Weekly scores ==
Individual judges' scores in the chart below (given in parentheses) are listed in this order from left to right: Valentin Chmerkovskiy, Mandy Moore, Adam Rippon.

=== Week 1: First Dances ===
Each couple performed the cha-cha-cha, foxtrot, jive or salsa. Couples are listed in the order they performed.

Couple	Scores	Dance	Music	Result
Jason & Elliana	18 (6, 6, 6)	Cha-cha-cha	"Bills" — LunchMoney Lewis	Safe
Tripp & Hailey	17 (6, 5, 6)	Foxtrot	"Mama Said" — The Shirelles	Eliminated
Addison & Lev	15 (5, 5, 5)	Cha-cha-cha	"Burnin' Up" — Jessie J, featuring 2 Chainz	Eliminated
Miles & Rylee	22 (7, 8, 7)	Salsa	"Who Let the Dogs Out?" — Baha Men	Safe
Sophia & Jake	21 (7, 7, 7)	Jive	"Do You Love Me" — The Contours	Safe
Hudson & Kameron	22 (7, 7, 8)	Cha-cha-cha	"There's Nothing Holdin' Me Back" — Shawn Mendes	Safe
Ariana & Artyon	24 (8, 8, 8)	Cha-cha-cha	"Cut to the Feeling" — Carly Rae Jepsen	Safe
Mackenzie & Sage	22 (7, 7, 8)	Foxtrot	"New York, New York" — Ray Quinn, featuring Ultra Love	Safe
Honey Boo Boo & Tristan	19 (6, 6, 7)	Salsa	"Conga" — Gloria Estefan & Miami Sound Machine	Safe
Mandla & Brightyn	24 (8, 8, 8)	Jive	"Land of a Thousand Dances" — Chris Kenner	Safe
Akash & Kamri	21 (7, 7, 7)	Foxtrot	"L-O-V-E" — Nat King Cole	Safe
Sky & JT	22 (8, 7, 7)	Salsa	"Light It Up" — Major Lazer, featuring Nyla & Fuse ODG	Safe

=== Week 2: Song from the Year I Was Born ===
Each couple performed one unlearned dance to a song that came out the year the celebrities were born. The Argentine tango, paso doble, and quickstep were introduced. Couples are listed in the order they performed.

Couple	Scores	Dance	Music	Result
Mackenzie & Sage	24 (8, 8, 8)	Quickstep	"Are You Gonna Be My Girl" — Jet	Safe
Sky & JT	22 (7, 7, 8)	Cha-cha-cha	"Just Dance" — Lady Gaga, featuring Colby O'Donis	Safe
Sophia & Jake	20 (7, 6, 7)	Foxtrot	"Love Story" — Taylor Swift	Safe
Jason & Elliana	21 (7, 7, 7)	Jive	"Shake It" — Metro Station	Safe
Mandla & Brightyn	22 (7, 7, 8)	Salsa	"Pump It" — The Black Eyed Peas	Safe
Hudson & Kameron	22 (7, 8, 7)	Paso doble	"4 Minutes" — Madonna, featuring Justin Timberlake & Timbaland	Eliminated
Miles & Rylee	24 (8, 8, 8)	Argentine tango	"I Don't Want to Be" — Gavin DeGraw	Safe
Honey Boo Boo & Tristan	19 (6, 6, 7)	Cha-cha-cha	"Don't Cha" — The Pussycat Dolls	Safe
Akash & Kamri	21 (7, 7, 7)	Cha-cha-cha	"Dynamite" — Taio Cruz	Safe
Ariana & Artyon	24 (8, 8, 8)	Jive	"Girlfriend" — Avril Lavigne	Safe

=== Week 3: Disney Night ===
Each couple performed one unlearned dance to a song from a Disney film. The Charleston, contemporary, jazz, and samba were introduced. Couples are listed in the order they performed.

Couple	Scores	Dance	Music	Disney film	Result
Sophia & Jake	19 (7, 6, 6)	Samba	"Poor Unfortunate Souls" — Pat Carroll	The Little Mermaid	Eliminated
Mackenzie & Sage	27 (9, 9, 9)	Contemporary	"Colors of the Wind" — Tori Kelly	Pocahontas	Safe
Ariana & Artyon	25 (9, 8, 8)	Samba	"Hawaiian Roller Coaster Ride" — Mark Kealiʻi Hoʻomalu	Lilo & Stitch	Safe
Mandla & Brightyn	21 (7, 7, 7)	Jazz	"Un Poco Loco" — Gael García Bernal & Anthony Gonzalez	Coco	Safe
Miles & Rylee	27 (9, 9, 9)	Charleston	"One Jump Ahead" — Brad Kane	Aladdin	Safe
Honey Boo Boo & Tristan	21 (7, 7, 7)	Foxtrot	"Something There" — Howard Ashman & Alan Menken	Beauty and the Beast	Safe
Sky & JT	24 (8, 8, 8)	Contemporary	"How Far I'll Go" — Auliʻi Cravalho	Moana	Safe
Jason & Elliana	22 (8, 7, 7)	Foxtrot	"You've Got a Friend in Me" — Jordan Fisher, featuring Olivia Holt	Toy Story	Safe
Akash & Kamri	21 (7, 7, 7)	Jive	"Zero to Hero" — Ariana Grande	Hercules	Safe

=== Week 4: Halloween Night ===
Each couple performed one unlearned dance to Halloween themes and songs. Couples are listed in the order they performed.

Couple	Scores	Dance	Music	Result
Akash & Kamri	21 (7, 7, 7)	Argentine tango	"Weird Science" — Oingo Boingo	Safe
Mandla & Brightyn	23 (8, 8, 7)	Charleston	"Witch Doctor" — Cartoons	Safe
Mackenzie & Sage	25 (8, 8, 9)	Jive	"Monster Mash" — Atwater Men's Club	Safe
Jason & Elliana	25 (8, 9, 8)	Argentine tango	"Youngblood" — 5 Seconds of Summer	Safe
Ariana & Artyon	22 (7, 8, 7)	Paso doble	"Ways to be Wicked" — from Descendants 2	Safe
Honey Boo Boo & Tristan	21 (7, 7, 7)	Jazz	"Ghostbusters" — Ray Parker Jr.	Eliminated
Sky & JT	26 (9, 9, 8)	Jive	"Little Shop of Horrors" — Kidz Bop	Safe
Miles & Rylee	27 (9, 9, 9)	Samba	"I Want Candy" — Bow Wow Wow	Safe

=== Week 5: Juniors' Choice ===
Each couple performed one unlearned dance to a song of their choice. Couples are listed in the order they performed.

Couple	Scores	Dance	Music	Result
Miles & Rylee	27 (9, 9, 9)	Jazz	"Space Jam" — Quad City DJ's	Safe
Mackenzie & Sage	27 (9, 9, 9)	Cha-cha-cha	"What If" — Johnny Orlando & Mackenzie Ziegler	Safe
Jason & Elliana	25 (9, 8, 8)	Jazz	"It's Tricky" — Run-DMC	Eliminated
Akash & Kamri	20 (7, 7, 6)	Charleston	"Do Your Thing" — Basement Jaxx	Safe
Sky & JT	23 (8, 8, 7)	Samba	"The Greatest" — Sia	Safe
Mandla & Brightyn	25 (8, 9, 8)	Cha-cha-cha	"Perm" — Bruno Mars	Safe
Ariana & Artyon	28 (9, 9, 10)	Jazz	"Rolex" — Ayo & Teo	Safe

=== Week 6: Giving Thanks ===
Each couple performed one unlearned dance dedicated to someone important in their lives. Couples are listed in the order they performed.

Couple	Scores	Dance	Music	Result
Ariana & Artyon	27 (9, 9, 9)	Salsa	"Píntame" — Elvis Crespo	Safe
Mandla & Brightyn	27 (9, 9, 9)	Foxtrot	"Isn't She Lovely" — Stevie Wonder	Safe
Akash & Kamri	23 (8, 8, 7)	Jazz	"Jai Ho! (You Are My Destiny)" — A. R. Rahman & The Pussycat Dolls	Eliminated
Miles & Rylee	26 (9, 9, 8)	Foxtrot	"Ain't No Mountain High Enough" — Marvin Gaye	Safe
Sky & JT	29 (9, 10, 10)	Foxtrot	"Unconditionally" – Katy Perry	Safe
Mackenzie & Sage	27 (9, 9, 9)	Samba	"Cheap Thrills" – Sia, featuring Sean Paul	Safe

=== Week 7: Time Machine ===
Each couple performed one unlearned dance to an era of their choice. Couples are listed in the order they performed.

Couple	Scores	Dance	Era	Music	Result
Miles & Rylee	28 (9, 9, 10)	Jive	1950s	"Rock Around the Clock" — Bill Haley & His Comets	Safe
Mackenzie & Sage	26 (9, 8, 9)	Jazz	1980s	"Call Me Maybe" — Carly Rae Jepsen	Safe
Mandla & Brightyn	24 (8, 8, 8)	Paso doble	Future	"Gangsta's Paradise" — 2WEI	Eliminated
Ariana & Artyon	27 (9, 9, 9)	Quickstep	1940s	"Classic" — MKTO	Safe
Sky & JT	27 (9, 9, 9)	Charleston	1920s	"A Little Party Never Killed Nobody (All We Got)" — Fergie, featuring Q-Tip & GoonRock	Safe

=== Week 8: Semi-Finals ===
Each couple performed one unlearned dance and a team fusion dance. No elimination took place. Couples are listed in the order they performed.

Couple	Scores	Dance	Music
Mackenzie & Sage	30 (10, 10, 10)	Paso doble	"The Edge of Glory" — Lady Gaga
Sky & JT	29 (10, 9, 10)	Argentine tango	"Thunder" — Imagine Dragons
Miles & Rylee	28 (9, 10, 9)	Cha-cha-cha	"Shake Señora" — Pitbull, featuring T-Pain & Sean Paul
Ariana & Artyon	28 (9, 9, 10)	Foxtrot	"We're All in This Together" — from High School Musical
Mackenzie & Sage Miles & Rylee	30 (10, 10, 10)	Jazz/Samba (Team U.S.A.)	"Party in the U.S.A." — Miley Cyrus
Ariana & Artyon Sky & JT	28 (10, 9, 9)	Foxtrot/Jive (Team Smalls)	"369" — Rhett George

=== Week 9: Finale ===
Each couple performed their favorite dance during the competition with their mentor and a holiday-themed freestyle. Couples are listed in the order they performed.

Couple	Mentor	Scores	Dance	Music	Result
Mackenzie & Sage	Gleb Savchenko	28 (9, 9, 10)	Cha-cha-cha	"What If" — Johnny Orlando & Mackenzie Ziegler	Runners-up
Mackenzie & Sage	Gleb Savchenko	30 (10, 10, 10)	Freestyle	"Drummer Boy" — Justin Bieber, featuring Busta Rhymes	Runners-up
Ariana & Artyon	Brandon Armstrong	30 (10, 10, 10)	Jazz	"Rolex" — Ayo & Teo	Runners-up
Ariana & Artyon	Brandon Armstrong	28 (9, 10, 9)	Freestyle	"You're a Mean One, Mr. Grinch" — Lindsey Stirling, featuring Sabrina Carpenter	Runners-up
Miles & Rylee	Lindsay Arnold	28 (10, 9, 9)	Salsa	"Who Let the Dogs Out" — Baha Men	Runners-up
Miles & Rylee	Lindsay Arnold	30 (10, 10, 10)	Freestyle	"Sleigh Ride" — District 78	Runners-up
Sky & JT	Alan Bersten	30 (10, 10, 10)	Salsa	"Light it Up" — Major Lazer, featuring Nyla & Fuse ODG	Winners
Sky & JT	Alan Bersten	30 (10, 10, 10)	Freestyle	"Underneath the Tree" — Kelly Clarkson	Winners

== Dance chart ==
The celebrities and professional partners danced one of these routines for each corresponding week:

- Week 1 (First Dances): One unlearned dance
- Week 2 (Song From the Year I Was Born): One unlearned dance
- Week 3 (Disney Night): One unlearned dance
- Week 4 (Halloween Night): One unlearned dance
- Week 5 (Juniors' Choice): One unlearned dance
- Week 6 (Giving Thanks): One unlearned dance
- Week 7 (Time Machine): One unlearned dance
- Week 8 (Semifinals): One unlearned dance & team fusion dance
- Week 9 (Finale): Favorite dance & freestyle

Couple	1	2	3	4	5	6	7	8		9	
Sky & JT	Salsa	Cha-cha-cha	Contemporary	Jive	Samba	Foxtrot	Charleston	Argentine tango	Foxtrot/Jive (Team Smalls)	Salsa	Freestyle
Miles & Rylee	Salsa	Argentine tango	Charleston	Samba	Jazz	Foxtrot	Jive	Cha-cha-cha	Jazz/Samba (Team U.S.A.)	Salsa	Freestyle
Ariana & Artyon	Cha-cha-cha	Jive	Samba	Paso doble	Jazz	Salsa	Quickstep	Foxtrot	Foxtrot/Jive (Team Smalls)	Jazz	Freestyle
Mackenzie & Sage	Foxtrot	Quickstep	Contemporary	Jive	Cha-cha-cha	Samba	Jazz	Paso doble	Jazz/Samba (Team U.S.A.)	Cha-cha-cha	Freestyle
Mandla & Brightyn	Jive	Salsa	Jazz	Charleston	Cha-cha-cha	Foxtrot	Paso doble				
Akash & Kamri	Foxtrot	Cha-cha-cha	Jive	Argentine tango	Charleston	Jazz					
Jason & Elliana	Cha-cha-cha	Jive	Foxtrot	Argentine tango	Jazz						
Honey Boo Boo & Tristan	Salsa	Cha-cha-cha	Foxtrot	Jazz							
Sophia & Jake	Jive	Foxtrot	Samba								
Hudson & Kameron	Cha-cha-cha	Paso doble									
Tripp & Hailey	Foxtrot										
Addison & Lev	Cha-cha-cha										
