= Emma Slater =

British and American dancer born (1988)

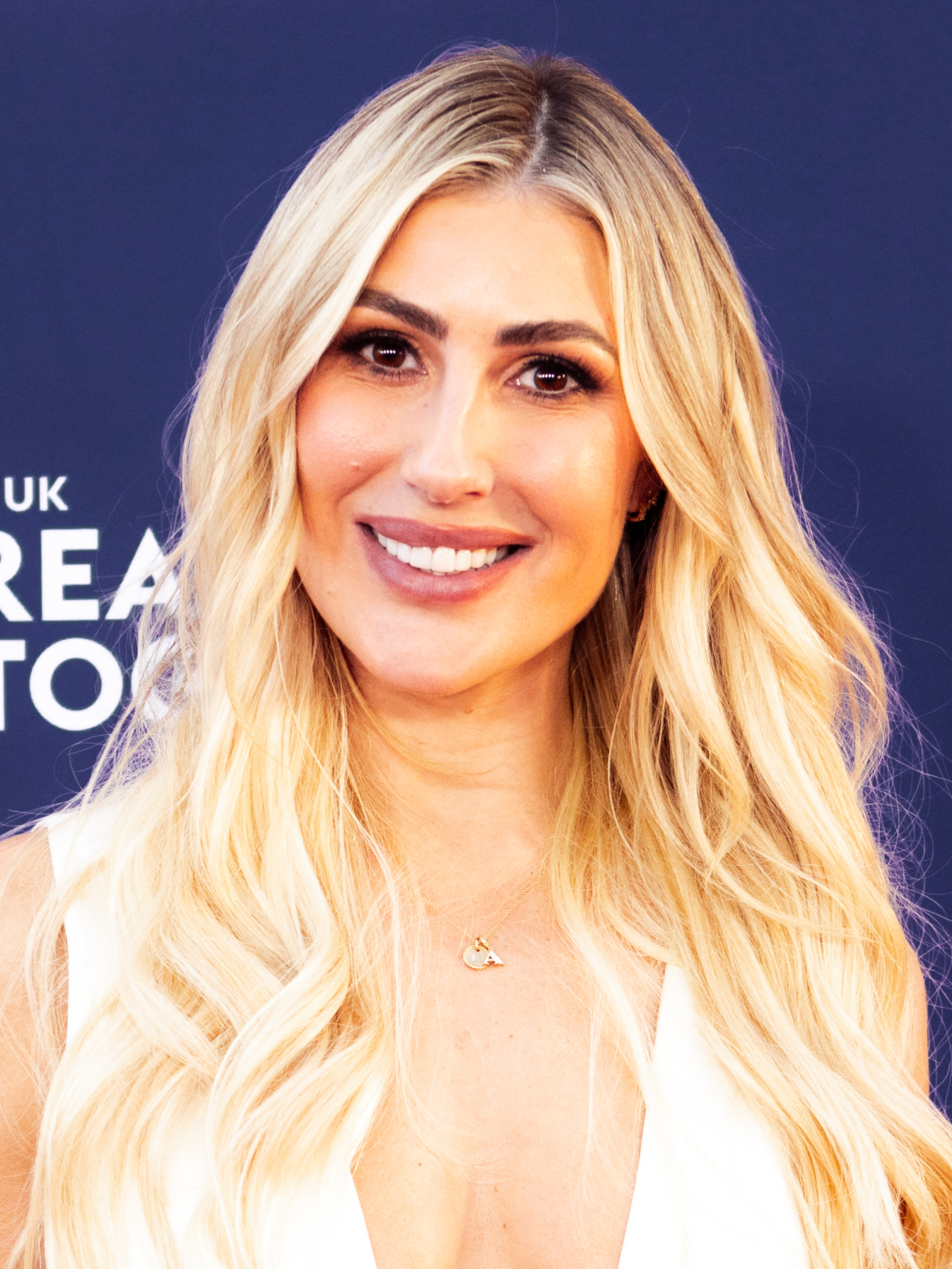
- Slater in 2026
- Born: Emma Louise Slater; 25 December 1988 (age 37); Sutton Coldfield, Birmingham, England
- Citizenship: United Kingdom; United States
- Occupations: Dancer; choreographer
- Years active: 2006–present
- Spouse: Sasha Farber (m. 2018; div. 2024)
- Website: www.emmaslater.com

Emma Louise Slater (born 25 December 1988) is a British and American professional dancer and choreographer best known for her appearances on the reality competition program Dancing with the Stars.

== Early life ==
Emma Louise Slater was born on 25 December 1988 in Sutton Coldfield, Birmingham, England. She has a twin sister, Kelly, who is a costume designer and stylist. Slater was raised in Tamworth, Staffordshire, and began taking dance classes at an early age. At age 10, Slater started her training in ballroom and Latin dance. In the early years of competing, she won a number of competitions in England. At 15, she appeared in a George Michael music video "Round Here" produced by Bikini Films on location in London. Later that year, Slater took part in the fitness video "Latinasize" again filmed at the Pinewood Studios in London.

== Personal life ==
She dated fellow Dancing with the Stars member Sasha Farber from 2011 to 2014. In December 2015, Farber made a post on his Instagram account confirming that he and Slater were back together. He proposed to Slater during a broadcast of Dancing with the Stars on 4 October 2016. They married on 25 March 2018, with fellow Dancing with the Stars pros Lindsay Arnold, Witney Carson and Jenna Johnson serving as bridesmaids, and Derek Hough serving as one of Farber's groomsmen. Slater became an American citizen in December 2020. The couple separated in April 2022. Slater filed for divorce in February 2023. She is now in a relationship with fellow Dancing with the Stars professional dancer Alan Bersten.

== Competitive dancing ==
Slater has numerous titles to her name. In 2005, at the age of 16, she won the British Under 21 Latin American Championships at the Blackpool Closed 2005. She won the 2006 United Kingdom Under 21 Latin American Championships at the Bournemouth Pavilions, England. Ranked in the world's top 10, Slater went on to represent the UK in competitions around the world.

== Stage, film and television ==
At 16, Slater joined the Simply Ballroom theatre show touring UK, including Theatre Royal, Drury Lane in London's West End, United Arab Emirates and South Africa. While in South Africa, Slater appeared on Dancing with the South African Stars with her celebrity partner TV Host Dalen Lance. Following Simply Ballroom, Slater had an extended run in London's West End with theatre shows; Dirty Dancing at the Aldwych Theatre where she was the Principal Latin Dancer/Ballroom Supervisor, but also understudied and played the principal role of Lisa Houseman, ‘Cheek to Cheek’ at The Coliseum and ‘Latin Fever’ at the Peacock Theatre.

Year	Title	Role	Notes
2005	Simply Ballroom	Principal Dancer	UK & World Tour
2005	George Michael Music Video	Feature Dancer	Round Here
2006	Cuban Groove	Dance Captain	Europe Tour
2007	Dirty Dancing	Principal Dancer Ballroom Supervisor	Aldwych Theatre
2008	Cheek to Cheek	Lead Latin/Ballroom Dancer	DuBeke/Boag Coliseum Theatre
2008	Latin Fever	Principal Dancer	Bennett/Kopylova Peacock Theatre
2009–2011	Burn the Floor	Lead Dancer	London's West End, Broadway and World Tour

In 2009, Slater joined the stage show Burn the Floor for the China tour initially, but later joined the cast for an extended run at the Longacre Theatre on Broadway New York City and a world tour covering: Belgium, Holland, Australia, Japan, South Korea, Canada, New Zealand, West End London, a nine-month US multi-city tour. She also danced and advised on UK's ITV Popstar to Opera Star on a number of occasions.

In 2008, Slater was included in the Universal Pictures movie Mamma Mia!. This included singing on the soundtrack. The movie was shot in part on the Greek island of Skopelos but primarily inside Pinewood Studios London.

In November 2026, Slater appeared as a minor character in an episode of the tv show Murdoch Mysteries.

== Dancing with the Stars ==
In March 2012, Slater joined the fourteenth season on the American edition of Dancing with the Stars as a troupe dancer, where she danced and choreographed all of the opening dance numbers including the finale. Later that year, she choreographed Usher at the Billboard Music Awards in Las Vegas including partner work with co-choreographer and also troupe member, Sasha Farber.

After three seasons of being a troupe member, she was announced as one of the new female professional dancers for the seventeenth season of the show in September 2013. Her celebrity partner was award-winning comedian, singer and actor, Bill Engvall. Despite receiving low scores from the judges for most of the season, they were able to reach the finals but were eliminated at the end of the first night, landing them in 4th place. For season 18, she returned as a professional dancer partnered with movie actor Billy Dee Williams. Due to a back injury on Billy Dee, they withdrew from the competition on Week 3. For season 19, she was paired with race-car driver Michael Waltrip and they finished in 7th place. For season 20, she paired with LMFAO singer Redfoo but on week 2, they were the first couple eliminated. For season 21 she paired with Vine star Hayes Grier. They were eliminated on Week 7 and finished in 8th place. Slater did not participate in Season 22 of the reality show.

Slater returned for season 23 and was paired with former Texas governor and two-time presidential candidate Rick Perry. They were eliminated on week 3 of competition and finished in 12th place. She returned for season 24 and was paired with NFL running back Rashad Jennings; Jennings and Slater won the competition on 23 May 2017, marking Slater's first win.

For season 25, Slater was partnered with realtor, and Property Brothers co-host, Drew Scott. They made the finals of the competition but were eliminated on night one, finishing in 4th place.

For season 26, Slater was paired with former MLB outfielder Johnny Damon. They were eliminated on the first week of competition, tying in 9th place with Jamie Anderson and Artem Chigvintsev.

For season 27, she was partnered with actor & country music singer John Schneider. The couple was eliminated on week 7 of competition and finished in joint 7th place with DeMarcus Ware and Lindsay Arnold.

For season 28, Slater was paired with actor James Van Der Beek. Despite earning high scores from the judges throughout the season and being considered frontrunners to win, the couple was eliminated during the semi-finals of the competition where they finished in 5th place.

For season 29, Slater was paired with former NBA player Charles Oakley. They were the first couple to be eliminated and finished in 15th place.

For season 30, Slater was paired with country singer Jimmie Allen. They finished in 7th place.

For season 31, Slater was paired with actor & model Trevor Donovan. They reached the semi-finals and finished in 6th place.

For season 33, Slater was partnered with actor Reginald VelJohnson. They reached the third week of competition and finished in 10th place in a double elimination.

For season 34, Slater was paired with actor & comedian Andy Richter. The pair finished in 7th place.

For season 35, Slater was paired with Savannah Bananas player and social media personality Jackson Olson. The pair finished in 8th place.

Season	Partner	Place	Average
17	Bill Engvall	4th	22.5
18	Billy Dee Williams	10th	15
19	Michael Waltrip	7th	18.4
20	Redfoo	12th	20
21	Hayes Grier	8th	24.2
23	Rick Perry	12th	16
24	Rashad Jennings	1st	27
25	Drew Scott	4th	23.8
26	Johnny Damon	9th	18
27	John Schneider	7th	22.2
28	James Van Der Beek	5th	25.1
29	Charles Oakley	15th	13.5
30	Jimmie Allen	7th	23.2
31	Trevor Donovan	6th	23.8
32	Mauricio Umansky	9th	18.5
33	Reginald VelJohnson	10th	15.8
34	Andy Richter	7th	19.6
35	Jackson Olson	9th	TBD

*Scores out of 40 are adjusted to be out of 30.

=== Season 17: with celebrity partner: Bill Engvall ===
Week #	Dance	Song	Judges' score				Result
Week #	Dance	Song	Inaba	Goodman	Tonioli	Guest judge	Result
1	Foxtrot	"Hot Stuff"	6	6	6	—N/a	No Elimination
2	Jive	"Crocodile Rock"	7	7	7	—N/a	Safe
3	Paso Doble	"William Tell Overture"	8	8	8	—N/a	Safe
4	Samba	"Cuban Pete"	7	—N/a	7	7	Safe
5	Viennese waltz	"She's Always a Woman"	8	8	8	—N/a	Safe
6	Tango	"Cheeseburger in Paradise"; Switch-Up Challenge	8 Awarded	8; 1	7 Point	—N/a	No Elimination
7	Quickstep; Team Freestyle	"Viva Las Vegas" "Bom Bom"	8; 9	7; 9	8; 9	—N/a	Safe
8	Disco; Dance Off	"Strong Enough" "Song for the Lonely"	8 Lost	—N/a	8 The	8 Event	Safe
9 Quarter-Finals	Charleston; Salsa	"Yakety Yak" "Candy"	7; 7	7; 7	7; 7	—N/a	Safe
10; Semi-Finals	Cha-cha-cha & Argentine tango	"Sexy and I Know It"	7; 8	7; 8	7; 8	7; 8	Safe
11; Finals	Viennese waltz Samba; Freestyle	"She's Always a Woman" "No Scrubs" "The Raiders March"	8 Awarded; 8	8; 2; 9	8 Points; 8	—N/a	Eliminated

=== Season 18: with celebrity partner: Billy Dee Williams ===
Week #	Dance	Song	Judges' score			Result
Week #	Dance	Song	Inaba	Goodman	Tonioli	Result
1	Cha-cha-cha	"Star Wars Theme"	5	5	5	No elimination
2	Tango	"Peter Gunn Theme"	5	5	5	Safe
3	Waltz	—N/a	—N/a	—N/a	—N/a	Withdrew

=== Season 19: with celebrity partner: Michael Waltrip ===
Week #	Dance	Song	Judges' score					Result
Week #	Dance	Song	Inaba	Goodman	Hough	Tonioli	Guest judge	Result
1	Cha-cha-cha	"Born to Be Wild"	7	6	6	6	—N/a	Safe
2	Samba	"Girls in Bikinis"	6	6	6	6	—N/a	Safe
3	Waltz	"(Everything I Do) I Do It for You"	7	—N/a	7	7	7	Safe
4	Quickstep	"Givin' It Up for Your Love"	6	—N/a	6	6	7	Safe
5 (Note: This week only, for "Partner Switch-Up" week, Waltrip performed with Witney Carson instead of Slater. Slater performed with Tommy Chong.)	Disco	"Car Wash"	5	—N/a	5	5	5	No elimination
6	Argentine Tango	"Give Me Everything"	8	—N/a	8	7	7	Safe
7	Jive; Team Freestyle	"The Devil Went Down to Georgia" "Black Widow"	5; 9	5; 9	5; 9	5; 9	—N/a	Safe
8	Foxtrot; Rumba	"You'll Be in My Heart" "I'm Not the Only One"	6 No	7 Extra	6 Points	6 Awarded	—N/a	Eliminated

=== Season 20: with celebrity partner: Redfoo ===
Week #	Dance	Song	Judges' score				Result
Week #	Dance	Song	Inaba	Goodman	Hough	Tonioli	Result
1	Cha-cha-cha	"Juicy Wiggle"	6	5	5	6	No elimination
2	Jive	"My Sharona"	8	7	8	8	Eliminated

=== Season 21: with celebrity partner: Hayes Grier ===
Week #	Dance	Song	Judges' score				Result
Week #	Dance	Song	Inaba	Hough	Tonioli	Guest judge	Result
1	Cha-cha-cha	"Cheerleader"	7	7	7	—N/a	No elimination
2	Foxtrot; Quickstep	"This Is How We Roll" "Are You Gonna Be My Girl"	8; 8	7; 7	7; 8	—N/a	Safe
3	Jive	"Teenage Mutant Ninja Turtles Theme"	7	7	8	8	Safe
4	Contemporary	"Stitches"	9	9	9	—N/a	Safe
5 (Note: This week only, for "Partner Switch-Up" week, Grier performed with Allison Holker instead of Slater. Slater performed with Alek Skarlatos.)	Viennese Waltz	"Like I'm Gonna Lose You"	8	8	7	7	No elimination
6	Jazz	"You're the One That I Want"	8	8	8	8	Safe
7	Waltz; Team Freestyle	"Once Upon a Dream" "This Is Halloween"	8; 10	9; 10	9; 10	—N/a	Eliminated

=== Season 23: with celebrity partner: Rick Perry ===
Week #	Dance	Song	Judges' score				Result
Week #	Dance	Song	Inaba	Goodman	Hough	Tonioli	Result
1	Cha-cha-cha	"God Blessed Texas"	5	5	5	5	No elimination
2	Quickstep	"Green Acres Theme"	6	5	6	5	Safe
3	Paso Doble	"Tamacun"	6	5	6	6	Eliminated

=== Season 24: with celebrity partner: Rashad Jennings ===
Week #	Dance	Song	Judges' score					Result
Week #	Dance	Song	Inaba	Goodman	Hough	Tonioli	Guest judge	Result
1	Cha-cha-cha	"24K Magic"	8	7	8	8	—N/a	No elimination
2	Viennese Waltz	"Suffer"	8	8	8	8	—N/a	Safe
3	Samba	"Swalla"	7	7	7	7	—N/a	Safe
4	Contemporary	"Unconditionally"	10	9	10	10	—N/a	Safe
5	Foxtrot	"Evermore"	7	8	9	8	—N/a	Safe
6	Tango; Team Freestyle	"Reach Out I'll Be There" "Dancing Machine", "You Got It (The Right Stuff)" & "Best Song Ever"	9; 8	9; 8	—N/a	9; 8	10; 9	Safe
7	Paso Doble; Jive	"O Fortuna" "Gimme Some Lovin'"	9 Awarded	9; 2	—N/a	9 Extra	10; Points	Safe
8	Jive; Argentine Tango	"Shake a Tail Feather" "Dreams"	9; 10	9; 9	9; 10	9; 10	—N/a	Safe
9 Semifinals	Rumba; Quickstep	"Say You Won't Let Go" "Yes I Can"	9; 10	9; 9	10; 10	10; 10	—N/a	Safe
10; Finals	Viennese Waltz; Freestyle; Cha-cha-cha & Tango Fusion	"Dark Times" "Let's Go" & "Uptown Funk" "I Don't Like It, I Love It"	10; 10; 10	10; 10; 9	10; 10; 10	10; 10; 10	—N/a	Winner

=== Season 25: with celebrity partner: Drew Scott ===
Week #	Dance	Song	Judges' score				Result
Week #	Dance	Song	Inaba	Goodman	Tonioli	Guest judge	Result
1	Foxtrot	"Our House"	6	5	5	—N/a	No elimination
2	Quickstep; Rumba	"Sing, Sing, Sing (With a Swing)" "Lights Down Low"	7; 7	6; 7	7; 7	—N/a	Safe
3	Argentine Tango	"Red Right Hand"	8	7	8	—N/a	No elimination
4	Jive	"Don't Stop Me Now"	8	8	8	—N/a	Safe
5	Viennese Waltz	"The Rainbow Connection"	9	8	8	—N/a	Safe
6	Paso Doble	"Legend"	7	7	7	9	Safe
7	Charleston; Team Freestyle	"Remains of the Day" "The Phantom of the Opera"	9; 10	9; 10	9; 10	—N/a	Safe
8	Waltz; Cha-Cha-Cha	"Both Sides, Now" "Get Up Offa That Thing"	7; 9	7; 8	8; 8	—N/a	Safe
9	Tango; Jazz	"I'm Gonna Be (500 Miles)" "Yeah!"	8; 8	8; 8	8; 8	—N/a	Safe
10	Paso Doble; Freestyle	"Get Ready" "The Ding-dong Daddy of the D-Car Line"	9; 9	9; 10	9; 10	9; 10	Eliminated

=== Season 26: with celebrity partner: Johnny Damon ===
Week #	Dance	Song	Judges' score			Result
Week #	Dance	Song	Inaba	Goodman	Tonioli	Result
1	Foxtrot	"Centerfield"	6	6	6	Eliminated

=== Season 27: with celebrity partner: John Schneider ===
Week #	Dance	Song	Judges' score			Result
Week #	Dance	Song	Inaba	Goodman	Tonioli	Result
1	Foxtrot	"Theme from The Dukes of Hazzard (Good Ol' Boys)"	7	5	6	Safe
2	Charleston; Jive	"New York's My Home" "King Creole"	8; 7	7; 6	8; 7	Safe
3	Waltz	"Smile"	7	7	7	Safe
4	Argentine Tango	"Torn"	7	7	7	Safe
5	Quickstep	"I Wan'na Be Like You"	8	8	8	No elimination
6	Paso Doble	"Main Titles (from Beetlejuice)"	6	7	6	Safe
7	Jazz; Team Freestyle	"Thank God I'm a Country Boy" "9 to 5"	8; 10	9; 9	8; 10	Eliminated

=== Season 28: with celebrity partner: James Van Der Beek ===
Week #	Dance	Song	Judges' score				Result
Week #	Dance	Song	Inaba	Goodman	Tonioli	Guest judge	Result
1	Tango	"Whatever It Takes"	7	7	7	—N/a	No elimination
2	Cha-cha-cha	"Dancing on the Ceiling"	7	6	7	—N/a	Safe
3	Rumba	"Shallow"	8	7	8	—N/a	Safe
4	Quickstep	"Walking on Sunshine"	7	7	7	7	Safe
5	Paso Doble	"He's a Pirate"	9	8	9	—N/a	No elimination
6	Samba	"Light It Up"	9	9	9	—N/a	Safe
7	Viennese Waltz; Team Freestyle	"I Put a Spell on You" "Somebody's Watching Me"	9; 9	9; 9	9; 9	—N/a	Safe
8	Contemporary	"Don't Stop Believin'"	10	10	10	—N/a	Immune
9	Jive; Jazz	"I'm So Excited" "Bye Bye Bye"	9; 9	9; 8	9; 9	9; 10	Safe
10; Semifinals	Cha-cha-cha; Foxtrot	"Canned Heat" "Take Me to Church"	8; 9	8; 9	8; 9	—N/a	Eliminated

^{1} Score given by guest judge Leah Remini. ^{2} Score given by guest judge Joey Fatone.

=== Season 29: with celebrity partner: Charles Oakley ===
Week #	Dance	Song	Judges' score			Result
Week #	Dance	Song	Inaba	Hough	Tonioli	Result
1	Salsa	"In da Club"	4	4	4	No elimination
2	Cha-cha-cha	"Never Too Much"	5	5	5	Eliminated

=== Season 30: with celebrity partner: Jimmie Allen ===
Week #	Dance	Song	Judges' score				Result
Week #	Dance	Song	Inaba	Goodman	Hough	Tonioli	Result
1	Tango	"The Way I Are"	6	5	6	5	No elimination
2	Rumba	"Make Me Want To"	7	6	7	7	Safe
3	Salsa	"Outrageous"	6	6	—N/a	8	Safe
4	Paso Doble; Mickey Dance Challenge; Jazz	"I'll Make a Man Out of You" "Bad Guy"	8 Awarded; 9	7; 2; 8	8 Extra; 9	7 Points; 9	Safe
5	Foxtrot	"Sandy"	8	8	9	9	Safe
6	Contemporary	"Say Something"	10	9	10	9	Safe
7	Viennese Waltz; Foxtrot	"Somebody to Love"; Under Pressure"	9 Awarded	9; 0	10; Extra	10; Points	Safe
8	Cha-cha-cha; Salsa	"Escapade" "Made for Now"	8 Awarded	8; 0	8 Extra	8 Points	Eliminated

=== Season 31: with celebrity partner: Trevor Donovan ===
Week #	Dance	Song	Judges' score					Result
Week #	Dance	Song	Inaba	Goodman	Hough	Tonioli	Guest judge	Result
1	Quickstep	"Dancing with Myself"	5	5	5	6	—N/a	Safe
2	Rumba	"Always On My Mind"	7	7	8	8	—N/a	Safe
3	Tango	"You Know My Name"	7	6	7	7	—N/a	Safe
4	Samba	"Life Is a Hughway"	7	7	7	7	—N/a	Bottom two
5	Jazz; Jive	"Viva la Vida" "Basket Case"	8; 8	8; 8	8; 8	8; 8	—N/a	Safe
6	Foxtrot	"Come Fly with Me"	9	8	8	9	8	Bottom two
7	Contemporary; Team Freestyle	"Ghost" "Heads Will Roll"	10; 10	9; 9	10; 10	10; 10	—N/a	Safe
8	Salsa; Samba	"Barbie Girl" "My Lovin' (You're Never Gonna Get It)"	8 Awarded	9; 5	8 Extra	9 Points	—N/a	Bottom three
9 Semifinals	Cha-cha-cha; Viennese Waltz	"Satisfied" "Count On Me"	8; 9	8; 8	8; 8	8; 8	—N/a	Eliminated

=== Season 32: with celebrity partner: Mauricio Umansky ===
Week #	Dance	Song	Judges' score				Result
Week #	Dance	Song	Inaba	Hough	Tonioli	Guest judge	Result
1	Jive	"I Ain't Worried"	5	5	5	—N/a	Bottom two
2	Salsa	"Quimbara"	4	4	4	—N/a	Safe
3	Foxtrot	"Working My Way Back to You"	7	5	5	6	Safe
4	Paso Doble	"The Sorcerer's Apprentice"	7	6	6	—N/a	Safe
5	Contemporary	"Rise Up"	8	8	8	—N/a	Safe
6	Argentine Tango; Hustle & Charleston Marathon	"Somebody's Watching Me" "Stayin' Alive" & "Grim Grinning Ghosts"	8 Awarded	8; 2	8 Extra	7 Points	Eliminated

=== Season 33: with celebrity partner: Reginald VelJohnson ===
Week #	Dance	Song	Judges' score				Result
Week #	Dance	Song	Inaba	Hough	Tonioli	Guest judge	Result
1	Salsa	"Motownphilly"	6	5	5	—N/a	No elimination
2	Paso Doble	"Ode to Joy"	6	4	5	—N/a	Safe
3	Foxtrot; Cha-cha-cha	"I Can See Clearly Now" "I Wanna Rock"	6; 6	5; 5	5; 5	5; 5	Eliminated

=== Season 34: with celebrity partner: Andy Richter ===
Week #	Dance	Song	Judges' score				Result
Week #	Dance	Song	Inaba	Hough	Tonioli	Guest judge	Result
1	Cha-cha-cha	"Hold On, I'm Comin'"	—N/a	5	4	—N/a	No elimination
2	Tango	"It's Raining Men"	6	5	5	—N/a	Safe
3	Foxtrot	"Northern Attitude"	6	6	6	—N/a	Safe
4	Viennese Waltz	"Le Festin"	6	6	6	—N/a	Safe
5	Samba	"Jump in The Line"	6	6	6	6	No elimination
6	Jazz	"One Short Day"	7	6	7	7	Safe
7	Paso Doble; Dance Marathon	"Symphony No. 5 (Beethoven)" "Murder on the Dancefloor" & "A Little Party Never Killed Nobody (All We Got)"	7; 1	7 Bonus	7 Point	7 Awarded	Safe
8	Contemporary; Team Dance	"God Only Knows" "Celebration"	7; 9	7; 10	7; 10	9; 9	Safe
9	Quickstep; Viennese Waltz	"Puttin' on the Ritz"	8	7	7	7	Eliminated

=== Season 35: with celebrity partner: Jackson Olson ===
Week #	Dance	Song	Judges' score				Result
Week #	Dance	Song	Inaba	Hough	Tonioli	Guest judge	Result
1	Cha-cha-cha	"Wannabe"	5	5	5	—N/a	Safe
2	Foxtrot	"That's So True"	6	6	6	—N/a	Safe
3	Paso doble	"Easy Lover"	6	6	6	—N/a	Safe
4	Waltz	"Without You"	7	7	7	—N/a	Safe
5	Salsa	"Uptown Funk"	8	8	7	8	Safe
6	Quickstep	L-O-V-E	8	8	8	8	No elimination
7	Paso Doble	"That's Life (song)"	9	9	9	8	Eliminated

== Notes ==
Awards and achievements
Preceded by Laurie Hernandez & Valentin Chmerkovskiy	Dancing with the Stars (US) champion Season 24 (Spring 2017 with Rashad Jennings)	Succeeded by Jordan Fisher & Lindsay Arnold
Preceded by Juan Pablo Di Pace & Cheryl Burke; Joe Amabile & Jenna Johnson; Suni Lee & Sasha Farber; Melora Hardin & Artem Chigvintsev	Dancing with the Stars (US) semi finalist Season 28 (Fall 2019 with James Van Der Beek); Season 31 (Fall 2022 with Trevor Donovan)	Succeeded by Skai Jackson & Alan Bersten; Johnny Weir & Britt Stewart; TBD
Preceded by Dorothy Hamill & Tristan MacManus	Dancing with the Stars (US) withdrew Season 18 (Spring 2014 with Billy Dee Williams)	Succeeded by Kim Zolciak-Biermann & Tony Dovolani
Preceded by Lolo Jones & Keo Motsepe; Barbara Corcoran & Keo Motsepe; Mary Wilson & Brandon Armstrong	Dancing with the Stars (US) last place Season 20 (Spring 2015 with Redfoo); Season 26 (Spring 2018 with Johnny Damon); Season 29 (Fall 2020 with Charles Oakley)	Succeeded by Chaka Khan & Keo Motsepe; Nikki Glaser & Gleb Savchenko; Martin Kove & Britt Stewart
