= Dancing with the Stars (American TV series) season 35 =

Dancing with the Stars
- Season 35
- Promotional poster for season 35, featuring hosts Alfonso Ribeiro and Julianne Hough, and the celebrity cast
- Hosted by: Alfonso Ribeiro; Julianne Hough
- Judges: Derek Hough; Carrie Ann Inaba; Bruno Tonioli
- No. of episodes: 12 (including After Party)

Release
- Original network: ABC; Disney+
- Original release: September 15, 2026 – present

Season chronology
- ← Previous; Season 34

Season thirty-five of Dancing with the Stars premiered on ABC and Disney+ on September 15, 2026, and is scheduled to conclude on November 24, 2026. This season was the fourth to air live on both networks simultaneously. Season nineteen champion Alfonso Ribeiro returned to host the installment, while former professional dancer and judge Julianne Hough returned as co-host. A holiday television special will air following the season finale.

== Cast ==
=== Couples ===
On April 22, 2026, during an upfront for Hulu's unscripted programming, Ciara Miller and Maura Higgins were announced as the first celebrity participants for the thirty-fifth season. Jackson Olson joined the cast three weeks later during an upfront for Disney's original programming. On June 17, TMZ reported that Guillermo Rodriguez joined the cast; Jimmy Kimmel confirmed Rodriguez's appearance later that day. Throughout August, Tyler Cameron, Jenna Dewan, Julia Stiles, Tatyana Ali, Sarah Jane Nader and Conner Leavitt were named to the cast. Nader is the younger sister of season thirty-three contestant Brooks Nader, and Leavitt is the husband of season thirty-four semi-finalist Whitney Leavitt. Amber Glenn and Ezra Frech became the first Olympic and Paralympic champions to compete during the same season.

The first celebrity-professional dancer pairing, Rodriguez and the reigning champion Witney Carson, was announced on Good Morning America on August 17, 2026. At the time of the announcement, Carson was four months pregnant with her third child. She became the first pro to enter an installment of Dancing with the Stars while pregnant, and the first to compete that far into her second trimester. Gleb Savchenko and Sasha Farber did not return as pros this season, although Farber was still involved in other capacities. After a five-year hiatus, Sharna Burgess returned to the lineup on August 24. Adele Zaikman, winner of Dancing with the Stars: The Next Pro, joined the series as a first-time pro on August 31. She is the first Israeli professional dancer to be featured on the series. Season thirty-four troupe member Hailey Bills was promoted to a first-time pro. Her pairing with Nader marked the third same-sex partnership in the series' history, following JoJo Siwa and Jenna Johnson from season thirty and Shangela and Savchenko from season thirty-one.

The full roster of celebrity participants and their partnerships was revealed on Good Morning America on September 2. With sixteen couples, this season is tied with season nine and season thirty-one as having the largest cast in the show's history.

Cast of Dancing with the Stars (season 35)
| Celebrity | Notability | Professional partner | Status | Ref. |
|---|---|---|---|---|
| Conner Leavitt | The Secret Lives of Mormon Wives cast member | Adele Zaikman | Eliminated 1st on September 15, 2026 | |
| Sarah Jane Nader | Love Thy Nader star | Hailey Bills | Eliminated 2nd on September 16, 2026 | |
| Giada De Laurentiis | Celebrity chef & entrepreneur | Alan Bersten | Eliminated 3rd on September 22, 2026 | |
| Taylor Hanson | Hanson frontman | Britt Stewart | Eliminated 4th on September 29, 2026 | |
| Ciara Miller | Summer House cast member | Brandon Armstrong | Eliminated 5th on October 6, 2026 | |
| Guillermo Rodriguez | Jimmy Kimmel Live! sidekick | Witney Carson | Eliminated 6th on October 13, 2026 | |
| Tyler Cameron | The Bachelorette runner-up | Sharna Burgess | Eliminated 7th & 8th on October 27, 2026 | |
| Jackson Olson | Savannah Bananas second baseman | Emma Slater | Eliminated 7th & 8th on October 27, 2026 | |
| Julia Stiles | Actress & director | Ezra Sosa | Eliminated 9th on November 2, 2026 | |
| Jenna Dewan | Actress & dancer | Val Chmerkovskiy; Alan Bersten (Week 6) | Eliminated 10th on November 10, 2026 | |
| Harry Shum Jr. | Actor & dancer | Jenna Johnson | Eliminated 11th on November 17, 2026 | |
| Tatyana Ali | Television actress & singer | Jan Ravnik | Finalist | |
| Ezra Frech | Paralympic track & field athlete | Daniella Karagach | Finalist | |
| Amber Glenn | Olympic figure skater | Pasha Pashkov | Finalist | |
| Maura Higgins | Television personality & model | Mark Ballas | Finalist | |
| Connor Wood | Stand-up comedian & podcaster | Rylee Arnold | Finalist | |

=== Hosts and judges ===
The hosts and judges for the season were announced on Good Morning America on September 1, 2026, one day before the cast reveal. Alfonso Ribeiro and Julianne Hough returned as hosts, while Derek Hough, Carrie Ann Inaba, and Bruno Tonioli returned as judges. Joe Buck served as the guest judge for Super Bowl Night. Kym Johnson served as the guest judge for Dedication Night. Shirley Ballas served as the guest judge for Horror Movie Night. Cynthia Erivo served as the guest judge for Disney Night.

The second season of the Dancing with the Stars podcast, hosted by season thirty-four quarter-finalist Andy Richter, launched on September 10. An official Dancing with the Stars aftershow, hosted by season thirty-four champion Robert Irwin, aired live immediately after the second night premiere episode on September 16.

Richter revealed the majority of the season's themes during the second episode of the Dancing with the Stars podcast. He did not not reveal the theme for the fifth week of competition; Super Bowl Night was announced on Good Morning America on September 30. Throughout the season, Richter shared the songs and dance styles for the upcoming week. The songs and dance styles for Dedication Night were exclusively revealed by People magazine on October 14.

=== Dance troupe ===
Kamri Peterson, a former pro on Dancing with the Stars: Juniors, was announced as a first-time troupe member on August 2, 2026, during the series' inaugural fan convention. Jaxon Willard, Carter Williams, and Onye Stevenson were announced as second-year troupe members on September 4.

== Episodes ==
| No. overall | No. in season | Title | Rating (18–49) (Note: Ratings are for ABC viewership, does not include Disney+ viewership.) | Original release date | U.S. viewers (millions) |
|---|---|---|---|---|---|
| 515 | 1 | "Premiere: Night One" | 1.44 | September 15, 2026 | 6.77 |
| 516 | 2 | "Premiere: Night Two" | 1.32 | September 16, 2026 | 6.44 |
| 517 | 3 | "Viral Hits Night" | 1.35 | September 22, 2026 | 6.45 |
| 518 | 4 | "Yacht Rock Night" | 1.40 | September 29, 2026 | 7.32 |
| 519 | 5 | "Mariah Carey Night" | TBA | October 6, 2026 | N/A |
| 520 | 6 | "Super Bowl Night" | 1.56 | October 13, 2026 | 6.59 |
| 521 | 7 | "Dedication Night" | 1.51 | October 20, 2026 | 7.36 |
| 522 | 8 | "Horror Movie Night" | TBA | October 27, 2026 | TBD |
| 523 | 9 | "Disney Night" | TBA | November 2, 2026 | TBD |
| 524 | 10 | "Grammy Night" | 1.59 | November 10, 2026 | 7.39 |
| 525 | 11 | "Semi-Finals" | TBA | November 17, 2026 | TBD |
| 526 | 12 | "Finale" | TBA | November 24, 2026 | TBD |
| 527 | 13 | "Dancing with the Holidays" | TBA | December 1, 2026 | TBD |

=== Special ===
| Title | Rating (18–49) | Original release date | U.S. viewers (millions) |
|---|---|---|---|
| "DWTS After Party" | 0.48 | September 16, 2026 | 6.44 |

== Scoring chart ==
The highest score each week is indicated in bold green with a dagger (†), while the lowest score each week is indicated in italicized red with a double-dagger (‡).

Color key:

Winners
Runners-up
Third place
Fourth place
Fifth place
Eliminated

Dancing with the Stars (season 35) — Weekly scores
| Couple | Pl. | Week | | | | | | | | | | | |
| Couple | Pl. | 1 | 2 | 3 | 4 | 5 (Note: The couples were scored on a 40-point scale due to the presence of a guest judge.) | 6 | 7 | 6+7 | 8 | 9 | 10 | 11 |
|---|---|---|---|---|---|---|---|---|---|---|---|---|---|
| Amber & Pasha | TBA | 18 | **21**† | **24**† | 23 | 34 | **38**† | 36 | 74 | 34+36=70 | 28+2=30 | 30+30=**60**† | |
| Connor W. & Rylee | TBA | 16 | 15 | 20 | 19 | 25 | 32‡ | 37 | 69 | 32+40=72 | 27‡ | 24+24=48‡ | |
| Ezra & Daniella | TBA | 20 | **21**† | 21 | 24 | **36**† | 37 | 35 | 72 | 37+40=77 | 27‡ | 27+30=57 | |
| Maura & Mark | TBA | **21**† | 19 | 22 | **25**† | 33 | 35 | 32 | 67 | 32+36=68‡ | 27+2=29 | 30+29=59 | |
| Tatyana & Jan | TBA | 12 | 18 | 21 | 20 | 29 | 32‡ | 28 | 60 | 33+36=69 | 27‡ | 27+28=55 | |
| Harry & Jenna | 6th | **21**† | 18 | **24**† | 24 | 33 | 36 | **40**† | **76**† | 40+40=**80**† | 29+2=**31**† | 30+30=**60**† (Note: This couple was eliminated.) | |
| Jenna & Val | 7th | 19 | **21**† | 21 | 24 | **36**† | 37 | 37 | 74 | 40+40=**80**† | 28+2=30 | | |
| Julia & Ezra | 8th | 18 | 16 | 19 | 21 | 33 | 36 | 26‡ | 62 | 33+36=69 | | | |
| Jackson & Emma | 9th | 15 | 18 | 18 | 21 | 31 | 32‡ | 35 | 67 | | | | |
| Tyler & Sharna | 9th | 17 | 16 | 17 | 21 | 30 | 32‡ | 26‡ | 58‡ | | | | |
| Guillermo & Witney | 11th | 10‡ | 12‡ | 15‡ | 13‡ | 22‡ | | | | | | | |
| Ciara & Brandon | 12th | 15 | 18 | 18 | 21 | | | | | | | | |
| Taylor & Britt | 13th | 16 | 15 | 18 | | | | | | | | | |
| Giada & Alan | 14th | 16 | 12‡ | | | | | | | | | | |
| Sarah Jane & Hailey | 15th | 14 | | | | | | | | | | | |
| Conner L. & Adele | 16th | 12 | | | | | | | | | | | |

== Weekly scores ==
Unless otherwise noted, individual judges' scores in the charts below (given in parentheses) are listed in this order from left to right: Carrie Ann Inaba, Derek Hough, Bruno Tonioli.

=== Week 1: Premiere ===
For the two-night season premiere, each couple performed one unlearned dance to a song that topped one of Billboard magazine's music charts during the year each celebrity was born. The male celebrities performed on the first night and the female celebrities performed on the second night. One couple was eliminated at the end of each night.

Night 1 (Men)

The opening number, choreographed by Jamal Sims, was set to "Dancing on My Own" by Robyn. The troupe performed a bumper to "Bangaranga" by Dara. Due to technical difficulties, online voting for the night was excluded and only votes cast via text messaging were accepted. The female celebrities and their professional partners performed a routine to "Cha Cha Cha" by Bruno Mars, choreographed by Brandon Armstrong and Jan Ravnik. Adele Zaikman, Allen Genkin, Erik Linder, and Selena Hamilton from Dancing with the Stars: The Next Pro performed a salsa bumper to "Dai Dai" by Shakira and Burna Boy. Inspired by Paris Baguette, one of the season's sponsors, co-host Julianne Hough and Tessandra Chavez choreographed a number to "I Love Paris" by Tatiana Eva-Marie and the Avalon Band; Hough additionally performed the routine with the pros.

Couples are listed in the order they performed.

Dancing with the Stars (season 35) – Week 1 (Night 1)
| Couple | Scores | Dance | Music | Result |
|---|---|---|---|---|
| Jackson & Emma | 15 (5, 5, 5) | Cha-cha-cha | "Wannabe" — Spice Girls | Safe |
| Tyler & Sharna | 17 (6, 5, 6) | Tango | "Are You Gonna Go My Way" — Lenny Kravitz | Safe |
| Conner L. & Adele (Note: During this episode, viewers were told to include the first letter of Connor Wood and Conner Leavitt's last names when they were voting via text messaging. The rule was abolished after Leavitt was eliminated.) | 12 (4, 4, 4) | Salsa | "Whoomp! (There It Is)" — Tag Team | Eliminated |
| Guillermo & Witney | 10 (4, 3, 3) | Cha-cha-cha | "Mr. Big Stuff" — Jean Knight | Safe |
| Ezra & Daniella | 20 (7, 6, 7) | Tango | "Since U Been Gone" — Kelly Clarkson | Safe |
| Connor W. & Rylee | 16 (6, 5, 5) | Cha-cha-cha | "I Like It, I Love It" — Tim McGraw | Safe |
| Taylor & Britt | 16 (6, 5, 5) | Quickstep | "Tell Her About It" — Billy Joel | Safe |
| Harry & Jenna | 21 (7, 7, 7) | Cha-cha-cha | "Let's Groove" — Earth, Wind & Fire | Safe |

Notes

Night 2 (Women)

The opening number, choreographed by Mandy Moore, was set to "Love Sensation" by Madonna. The troupe performed a number to "Danceteria" by Madonna and a tango bumper to "Pinky Up" by Katseye. Singer-songwriter BC Jean performed "Black Velvet" by Alannah Myles for Maura Higgins' foxtrot. Inspired by Google Gemini, one of the season's sponsors, judge Derek Hough and Tessandra Chavez choreographed a number to "Asturias Variations" by Isaac Albéniz and "Hanuman" by Rodrigo y Gabriela. Hough additionally performed the routine with his wife Hayley Erbert and dancers who were featured in their Symphony of Dance stage tour.

Couples are listed in the order they performed.

Dancing with the Stars (season 35) – Week 1 (Night 2)
| Couple | Scores | Dance | Music | Result |
|---|---|---|---|---|
| Tatyana & Jan | 12 (4, 4, 4) | Jive | "Knock on Wood" — Amii Stewart | Safe |
| Amber & Pasha | 18 (6, 6, 6) | Cha-cha-cha | "Smooth" — Santana feat. Rob Thomas | Safe |
| Ciara & Brandon | 15 (5, 5, 5) | Foxtrot | "Exhale (Shoop Shoop)" — Whitney Houston | Safe |
| Giada & Alan | 16 (6, 5, 5) | Tango | "Venus" — Shocking Blue | Safe |
| Julia & Ezra | 18 (6, 6, 6) | Quickstep | "9 to 5" — Dolly Parton | Safe |
| Maura & Mark | 21 (7, 7, 7) | Foxtrot | "Black Velvet" — Alannah Myles | Safe |
| Sarah Jane & Hailey | 14 (5, 4, 5) | Jive | "Sk8er Boi" — Avril Lavigne | Eliminated |
| Jenna & Val | 19 (6, 6, 7) | Tango | "Call Me" — Blondie | Safe |

=== Week 2: Viral Hits Night ===
Each couple performed one unlearned dance to a song that went viral on social media. The opening number, choreographed and performed by the troupe, was set to "Lush Life" by Zara Larsson. Adele Zaikman and Hailey Bills performed a samba bumper to "Mi Chico" by DJ Goja. Music producer Harrison performed his cover of "All the Things She Said" for Amber Glenn's tango. The troupe later performed a tango routine to "Talking Body" by Tove Lo.

Couples are listed in the order they performed.

Dancing with the Stars (season 35) – Week 2
| Couple | Scores | Dance | Music | Result |
|---|---|---|---|---|
| Jenna & Val | 21 (7, 7, 7) | Jive | "Animal" — Katseye | Safe |
| Ciara & Brandon | 18 (6, 6, 6) | Tango | "No Broke Boys" — Disco Lines & Tinashe | Safe |
| Tyler & Sharna | 16 (6, 5, 5) | Salsa | "Girls" — The Kid Laroi | Safe |
| Julia & Ezra | 16 (5, 6, 5) | Tango | "The Door" — Teddy Swims | Safe |
| Jackson & Emma | 18 (6, 6, 6) | Foxtrot | "That's So True" — Gracie Abrams | Safe |
| Giada & Alan | 12 (4, 4, 4) | Salsa | "Bella Ciao" — Becky G | Eliminated |
| Connor & Rylee | 15 (5, 5, 5) | Tango | "12 to 12" — Sombr | Safe |
| Ezra & Daniella | 21 (7, 7, 7) | Cha-cha-cha | "Low" — Flo Rida | Safe |
| Tatyana & Jan | 18 (6, 6, 6) | Foxtrot | "What Was I Made For?" — Billie Eilish | Safe |
| Amber & Pasha | 21 (7, 7, 7) | Tango | "All the Things She Said" — Harrison | Safe |
| Guillermo & Witney | 12 (4, 4, 4) | Paso doble | "Where Have You Been" — Rihanna | Safe |
| Taylor & Britt | 15 (5, 5, 5) | Cha-cha-cha | "Cake by the Ocean" — DNCE | Safe |
| Harry & Jenna | 18 (6, 6, 6) | Viennese waltz | "Iris" — Goo Goo Dolls | Safe |
| Maura & Mark | 19 (6, 6, 7) | Cha-cha-cha | "September" — Earth, Wind & Fire | Safe |

=== Week 3: Yacht Rock Night ===
Each couple performed one unlearned dance to a yacht rock song. The opening number, performed by the eliminated pros and the troupe, was set to "This Is It" by Kenny Loggins. The eliminated pros also performed a routine to "Baby Come Back" by Player. The troupe performed a bumper to "Love Will Keep Us Together" by Captain & Tennille.

Couples are listed in the order they performed.

Dancing with the Stars (season 35) – Week 3
| Couple | Scores | Dance | Music | Result |
|---|---|---|---|---|
| Amber & Pasha | 24 (8, 8, 8) | Foxtrot | "Hold the Line" — Toto | Safe |
| Julia & Ezra | 19 (6, 7, 6) | Salsa | "I Can't Go for That (No Can Do)" — Hall & Oates | Safe |
| Guillermo & Witney | 15 (5, 5, 5) | Foxtrot | "Escape (The Piña Colada Song)" — Rupert Holmes | Safe |
| Tatyana & Jan | 21 (7, 7, 7) | Quickstep | "Maneater" — Hall & Oates | Safe |
| Harry & Jenna | 24 (8, 8, 8) | Jive | "You Make My Dreams (Come True)" — Hall & Oates | Safe |
| Taylor & Britt | 18 (6, 6, 6) | Foxtrot | "What a Fool Believes" — The Doobie Brothers | Eliminated |
| Maura & Mark | 22 (7, 7, 8) | Quickstep | "Turn Your Love Around" — George Benson | Safe |
| Ciara & Brandon | 18 (6, 6, 6) | Cha-cha-cha | "Never Too Much" — Luther Vandross | Safe |
| Jackson & Emma | 18 (6, 6, 6) | Paso doble | "Easy Lover" — Philip Bailey & Phil Collins | Safe |
| Connor & Rylee | 20 (7, 6, 7) | Foxtrot | "Everywhere" — Fleetwood Mac | Safe |
| Jenna & Val | 21 (7, 7, 7) | Samba | "Africa" — Toto | Safe |
| Tyler & Sharna | 17 (5, 6, 6) | Jive | "Still the One" — Orleans | Safe |
| Ezra & Daniella | 21 (7, 7, 7) | Foxtrot | "Just the Two of Us" — Grover Washington Jr. feat. Bill Withers | Safe |

=== Week 4: Mariah Carey Night ===
Each couple performed one unlearned dance to songs by Mariah Carey, who sent a message to the cast before the episode began. The opening number, choreographed by Luam Keflezgy, was set to "Heartbreaker" (featuring Jay-Z). Season seventeen champion Amber Riley returned to perform "It's Like That" for Harry Shum Jr.'s tango. Adele Zaikman, Hailey Bills and the troupe performed a bumper to "Loverboy". The eliminated pros performed a routine to "Always Be My Baby".

Couples are listed in the order they performed.

Dancing with the Stars (season 35) – Week 4
| Couple | Scores | Dance | Mariah Carey music | Result |
|---|---|---|---|---|
| Ciara & Brandon | 21 (7, 7, 7) | Jazz | "Emotions" | Eliminated |
| Ezra & Daniella | 24 (8, 8, 8) | Rumba | "Anytime You Need a Friend" | Safe |
| Harry & Jenna | 24 (8, 8, 8) | Tango | "It's Like That" | Safe |
| Jenna & Val | 24 (8, 8, 8) | Rumba | "My All" | Safe |
| Tyler & Sharna | 21 (7, 7, 7) | Foxtrot | "#Beautiful" (feat. Miguel) | Safe |
| Maura & Mark | 25 (9, 8, 8) | Waltz | "If It's Over" | Safe |
| Guillermo & Witney | 13 (4, 4, 5) | Samba | "Obsessed" | Safe |
| Jackson & Emma | 21 (7, 7, 7) | Waltz | "Without You" | Safe |
| Tatyana & Jan | 20 (6, 7, 7) | Jazz | "Fantasy" | Safe |
| Connor & Rylee | 19 (6, 6, 7) | Rumba | "Touch My Body" | Safe |
| Julia & Ezra | 21 (7, 7, 7) | Viennese waltz | "Vision of Love" | Safe |
| Amber & Pasha | 23 (7, 8, 8) | Rumba | "Hero" | Safe |

=== Week 5: Super Bowl Night ===
Individual judges' scores in the charts below (given in parentheses) are listed in this order from left to right: Carrie Ann Inaba, Derek Hough, Joe Buck, Bruno Tonioli.

To commemorate Super Bowl LXI, each couple performed one unlearned dance to songs that were performed in various Super Bowl halftime shows. Monday Night Football play-by-play commentator Joe Buck appeared as a guest judge. The opening number, choreographed by Jamal Sims, was set to "Nuevayol" by Bad Bunny, "Rude Boy" by Rihanna, and "Humble" by Kendrick Lamar. It featured appearances from season three champion Emmitt Smith and season fourteen champion Donald Driver.

Britt Stewart and Brandon Armstrong performed a bumper to "Bootylicious" by Destiny's Child. Smith and Driver joined season twenty-seven contestant DeMarcus Ware and season thirty-three finalist Danny Amendola in a number to "Heavy Action" (the Monday Night Football theme music) and "In the Air Tonight" by Chris Stapleton. It was choreographed by Sims and the Super Bowl champions performed with Hailey Bills, Onye Stevenson, Britt Stewart, and Adele Zaikman. Julia Stiles' jazz routine featured a cameo appearance from her Save the Last Dance (2001) co-star Sean Patrick Thomas.

Couples are listed in the order they performed.

Dancing with the Stars (season 35) – Week 5
| Couple | Scores | Dance | Music | Super Bowl halftime show | Result |
|---|---|---|---|---|---|
| Maura & Mark | 33 (8, 8, 9, 8) | Tango | "Only Girl (In the World)" — Rihanna | LVII | Safe |
| Jackson & Emma | 31 (8, 8, 8, 7) | Salsa | "Uptown Funk" — Mark Ronson feat. Bruno Mars | 50 | Safe |
| Amber & Pasha | 34 (8, 9, 9, 8) | Samba | "Mi Gente" — J Balvin & Willy William | LIV | Safe |
| Tyler & Sharna | 30 (8, 7, 8, 7) | Jazz | "The Time (Dirty Bit)" — Black Eyed Peas | XLV | Safe |
| Connor & Rylee | 25 (6, 6, 7, 6) | Samba | "Hips Don't Lie" — Shakira feat. Wyclef Jean | LIV | Safe |
| Julia & Ezra | 33 (8, 8, 9, 8) | Jazz | "Jenny from the Block (Trackmasters Remix)" — Jennifer Lopez feat. Jadakiss & Styles P | LIV | Safe |
| Tatyana & Jan | 29 (7, 7, 8, 7) | Salsa | "Squabble Up" — Kendrick Lamar | LIX | Safe |
| Guillermo & Witney | 22 (6, 5, 6, 5) | Salsa | "Tití Me Preguntó" — Bad Bunny | LX | Eliminated |
| Jenna & Val | 36 (9, 9, 9, 9) | Paso doble | "Bad Romance" — Lady Gaga | LI | Safe |
| Harry & Jenna | 33 (8, 8, 9, 8) | Samba | "Yeah!" — Usher feat. Lil Jon & Ludacris | LVIII | Safe |
| Ezra & Daniella | 36 (9, 9, 9, 9) | Salsa | "Hot in Herre" — Nelly | XXXVIII | Safe |

=== Week 6: Dedication Night ===
Individual judges' scores in the charts below (given in parentheses) are listed in this order from left to right: Carrie Ann Inaba, Derek Hough, Kym Johnson, Bruno Tonioli.

Each couple performed one unlearned dance to honor the most influential figures and institutions in the celebrities' lives. There was no elimination this week; all scores were carried over to the following week. Two-time mirrorball champion Kym Johnson returned as a guest judge for the second consecutive year. Val Chmerkovskiy was suspended from participating in this episode after he made inappropriate remarks on social media against judge Carrie Ann Inaba that referenced actor Will Smith slapping comedian Chris Rock during the 94th Academy Awards. It marked the first time a professional dancer had been suspended in Dancing with the Stars history. As a result, Jenna Dewan performed her Viennese waltz with Alan Bersten.

For the second consecutive year, the friends, family members, and special guests selected by each celebrity contestant were incorporated into their routines. For her Viennese waltz, Tatyana Ali was joined by her The Fresh Prince of Bel-Air (1990–1996) co-star Alfonso Ribeiro. She also performed "(You Don't Know) How Glad I Am" by Nancy Wilson. Maura Higgins was joined by professional Irish stepdancer Lochlan "Lucky" Howard for her paso doble. Tyler Cameron was joined by his fiancée Tate Madden for his contemporary routine. During the performance, the couple revealed that Madden was pregnant with their first child, a daughter. At the end of her contemporary routine, Julia Stiles was joined by her 10 Things I Hate About You (1999) co-stars Joseph Gordon-Levitt, Larisa Oleynik, Andrew Keegan, Gabrielle Union, and Susan May Pratt.

The troupe performed a bumper to "Stay (If You Wanna Dance)" by Myles Smith. Hailey Bills and Brandon Armstrong performed a bumper to "Fever Dream" by Alex Warren. Adele Zaikman and Allen Genkin honored Dolly Parton with a performance to "Here You Come Again" by Parton and Willa Amai. Genkin, the eliminated pros, and the troupe performed a number to "CATastrophe" by Hilary Duff from The Cat in the Hat (2026). It was choreographed by Bills and Bersten and featured an appearance from season thirty-two champion Xochitl Gomez.

Couples are listed in the order they performed.

Dancing with the Stars (season 35) – Week 6
| Couple | Scores | Dance | Music | Dedicated to |
|---|---|---|---|---|
| Ezra & Daniella | 37 (9, 9, 10, 9) | Contemporary | "Bloodline" — Mon Rovîa | Bahar Soomekh, Ezra's mother |
| Tatyana & Jan | 32 (8, 8, 8, 8) | Viennese waltz | "(You Don't Know) How Glad I Am" — Nancy Wilson | James Avery, Tatyana's deceased The Fresh Prince of Bel-Air co-star |
| Maura & Mark | 35 (8, 9, 9, 9) | Paso doble | "I'm Shipping Up to Boston" — Dropkick Murphys | Ireland, Maura's home country |
| Jackson & Emma | 32 (8, 8, 8, 8) | Quickstep | "L-O-V-E" — Nat King Cole | Laura Olson, Jackson's mother |
| Amber & Pasha | 38 (10, 9, 10, 9) | Contemporary | "Breathe Me" — Sia | Brooke Glenn, Amber's younger sister |
| Jenna & Alan | 37 (10, 9, 9, 9) | Viennese waltz | "Unchained Melody" — The Righteous Brothers | Nancy Bursch, Jenna's mother |
| Harry & Jenna | 36 (9, 9, 9, 9) | Foxtrot | "Stop This Train" — John Mayer | Shelby Rabara, Harry's wife |
| Connor & Rylee | 32 (8, 8, 8, 8) | Viennese waltz | "Piano Man" — Billy Joel | Pete Masich, Connor's father |
| Tyler & Sharna | 32 (8, 8, 8, 8) | Contemporary | "Supermarket Flowers" — Ed Sheeran | Mothers, in honor of Tyler's deceased mother, Andrea Hermann Cameron |
| Julia & Ezra | 36 (9, 9, 9, 9) | Contemporary | "Can't Take My Eyes Off You" — Frankie Valli | Heath Ledger, Julia's deceased 10 Things I Hate About You co-star |

=== Week 7: Horror Movie Night ===
Individual judges' scores in the charts below (given in parentheses) are listed in this order from left to right: Carrie Ann Inaba, Derek Hough, Shirley Ballas, Bruno Tonioli.

Each couple performed one unlearned dance inspired by horror films. There was a double elimination this week. Strictly Come Dancing and Dancing with the Stars: The Next Pro head judge Shirley Ballas appeared as a guest judge. Val Chmerkovskiy returned to compete with Jenna Dewan after he was suspended last week. The opening number, performed by the eliminated pros and the troupe, was set to "Tubular Bells" by Mike Oldfield. The troupe performed bumpers to "Main Title Theme (from Beetlejuice Beetlejuice)" by Danny Elfman and "Magic" by Hailee Steinfeld; the latter was choreographed by Brandon Armstrong. Singer-songwriter BC Jean performed "Madness" by Ruelle for Ezra Frech's jazz routine and "Cry Little Sister" by Gerard McMahon for Maura Higgins' contemporary routine. Britt Stewart and Alan Bersten performed a bumper to "Dying for You" by Charli XCX.

Couples are listed in the order they performed.

Dancing with the Stars (season 35) – Week 7
| Couple | Scores | Dance | Music | Film | Result |
|---|---|---|---|---|---|
| Julia & Ezra | 26 (7, 7, 4, 8) | Argentine tango | "The Dogs Attack" — Jerry Goldsmith | The Omen | Safe |
| Harry & Jenna | 40 (10, 10, 10, 10) | Contemporary | "Toxic" — 2WEI | Saw | Safe |
| Tatyana & Jan | 28 (8, 8, 4, 8) | Paso doble | "I Lied to You" — Miles Caton | Sinners | Safe |
| Jenna & Val | 37 (9, 10, 9, 9) | Argentine tango | "Uninvited" — Damned Anthem & Kendra Dantes | 28 Weeks Later | Safe |
| Connor & Rylee | 37 (10, 10, 8, 9) | Contemporary | "You Are My Sunshine" — Charles McDonald | Annabelle: Creation | Safe |
| Ezra & Daniella | 35 (8, 9, 9, 9) | Jazz | "Madness" — Ruelle | The Invisible Man | Safe |
| Jackson & Emma | 35 (9, 9, 8, 9) | Contemporary | "That's Life" — Frank Sinatra | Joker | Eliminated |
| Tyler & Sharna | 26 (7, 7, 5, 7) | Viennese waltz | "Love Song for a Vampire" — Annie Lennox | Bram Stoker's Dracula | Eliminated |
| Amber & Pasha | 36 (9, 9, 9, 9) | Argentine tango | "Perfection" — Clint Mansell | Black Swan | Safe |
| Maura & Mark | 32 (9, 8, 7, 8) | Contemporary | "Cry Little Sister" — Gerard McMahon | The Lost Boys | Safe |

=== Week 8: Disney Night ===
Individual judges' scores in the charts below (given in parentheses) are listed in this order from left to right: Carrie Ann Inaba, Derek Hough, Cynthia Erivo, Bruno Tonioli.

To avoid conflicts with the U.S. midterm elections, held on November 3, 2026, Dancing with the Stars moved the air date of this episode to Monday, one day earlier. Each couple performed one unlearned dance and participated in a team dance to songs from the Disney on Broadway series of musicals and stage plays. Actress and singer Cynthia Erivo appeared as a guest judge. The teams were chosen by the celebrities with the lowest combined scores, Tatyana Ali and Connor Wood. For the second consecutive year, co-hosts Alfonso Ribeiro and Julianne Hough each joined a team.

The opening number, choreographed by Joey Pizzi, was set to a medley of four musicals and featured appearances from several vocalists: "Circle of Life/Nants Ingonyama" from The Lion King featuring Heather Headley, Selloane Nkhela, and the musical's cast; "Belle" from Beauty and the Beast featuring Kyra Belle Johnson; "Seize the Day" from Newsies; and "The Greatest Show" from The Greatest Showman. Additionally, Headley performed "Easy as Life" for Ali's contemporary routine and "I See the Light" for Wood's waltz; Johnson performed "Supercalifragilisticexpialidocious" for Harry Shum Jr.'s jazz routine; Michael James Scott performed "Under the Sea" for Ezra Frech's samba; and Rodney Ingram performed "Be Our Guest" for Jenna Dewan's quickstep. Season fourteen contestant Sherri Shepherd and Ingram joined Britt Stewart, Brandon Armstrong, the troupe for a performance to "Friend Like Me" from Aladdin, choreographed by Stewart.

Couples are listed in the order they performed.

Dancing with the Stars (season 35) – Week 8
| Couple | Scores | Dance | Music | Disney theatrical production | Result |
|---|---|---|---|---|---|
| Amber & Pasha | 34 (8, 9, 8, 9) | Quickstep | "A Star is Born" | Hercules | Safe |
| Maura & Mark | 32 (8, 8, 8, 8) | Jive | "You Can Fly! You Can Fly! You Can Fly!" | Peter Pan | Safe |
| Tatyana & Jan | 33 (9, 8, 8, 8) | Contemporary | "Easy as Life" | Aida | Safe |
| Harry & Jenna | 40 (10, 10, 10, 10) | Jazz | "Supercalifragilisticexpialidocious" | Mary Poppins | Safe |
| Ezra & Daniella | 37 (9, 10, 9, 9) | Samba | "Under the Sea" | The Little Mermaid | Safe |
| Julia & Ezra | 33 (8, 8, 8, 9) | Paso doble | "Satisfied" | Hamilton | Eliminated |
| Jenna & Val | 40 (10, 10, 10, 10) | Quickstep | "Be Our Guest" | Beauty and the Beast | Safe |
| Connor & Rylee | 32 (8, 8, 8, 8) | Waltz | "I See the Light" | Tangled | Safe |
| Alfonso Ribeiro Amber & Pasha Julia & Ezra Maura & Mark Tatyana & Jan | 36 (9, 9, 9, 9) | Freestyle (Team Slaytopia) | "Zoo" | Zootopia 2 | |
| Julianne Hough Connor & Rylee Ezra & Daniella Harry & Jenna Jenna & Val | 40 (10, 10, 10, 10) | Freestyle (Team Wildcats) | "We're All in This Together" | High School Musical on Stage! | |

=== Week 9: Grammy Night ===
To commemorate the 69th Annual Grammy Awards, each couple performed one unlearned dance to songs that either won or were nominated for a Grammy Award. Six couples also participated in a dance-off for two extra points, which featured live performances from season eleven semi-finalist Brandy, Monica, Maren Morris, and Sheryl Crow. Harry Shum Jr. & Jenna Johnson, who had the highest cumulative point total so far, earned immunity from the dance-offs and automatically received two bonus points.

The opening number was set to "Just Keep Watching" by Tate McRae. Emma Slater and Alan Bersten performed a jive bumper to "As It Was" by Harry Styles, and Sharna Burgess and Brandon Armstrong performed an Argentine tango bumper to "Radioactive" by Imagine Dragons. The pros and troupe members that will be joining the 2027 Dancing with the Stars: Live tour performed a number to "Good Luck, Babe!" by Chappell Roan, choreographed by Britt Stewart and Brandon Armstrong.

Couples are listed in the order they performed.

Dancing with the Stars (season 35) – Week 9
| Couple | Scores | Dance | Music | Result |
|---|---|---|---|---|
| Ezra & Daniella | 27 (9, 9, 9) | Argentine tango | "Crazy in Love (The Remix)" — Beyoncé | Safe |
| Amber & Pasha | 28 (9, 9, 10) | Paso doble | "Bring Me to Life" — Evanescence | Safe |
| Maura & Mark | 27 (9, 9, 9) | Argentine tango | "Thong Song" — Sisqó | Safe |
| Jenna & Val | 28 (10, 9, 9) | Jazz | "All for You" — Janet Jackson | Eliminated |
| Tatyana & Jan | 27 (9, 9, 9) | Tango | "Boom Boom Pow" — Black Eyed Peas | Safe |
| Connor & Rylee | 27 (9, 9, 9) | Argentine tango | "SexyBack" — Justin Timberlake feat. Timbaland | Safe |
| Harry & Jenna | 29 (10, 9, 10) | Salsa | "Die with a Smile" — Lady Gaga & Bruno Mars | Safe |

Dance-offs
| Couple | Dance | Music | Result |
|---|---|---|---|
| Amber & Pasha | Rumba | "The Boy Is Mine" — Brandy & Monica | Winners |
| Ezra & Daniella | Rumba | "The Boy Is Mine" — Brandy & Monica | Losers |
| Jenna & Val | Cha-cha-cha | "The Middle" — Zedd, Maren Morris & Grey | Winners |
| Tatyana & Jan | Cha-cha-cha | "The Middle" — Zedd, Maren Morris & Grey | Losers |
| Connor & Rylee | Cha-cha-cha | "All I Wanna Do" — Sheryl Crow | Losers |
| Maura & Mark | Cha-cha-cha | "All I Wanna Do" — Sheryl Crow | Winners |

=== Week 10: Semi-Finals ===
Each couple performed two routines, one unlearned ballroom dance and one unlearned Latin dance, for a chance to compete in the season finale. Adele Zaikman, Ezra Sosa, and Valentin Chmerkovskiy performed a number set to "Edamame" by Bbno$ featuring Rich Brian.

Couples are listed in the order they performed.

Dancing with the Stars (season 35) – Week 10
| Couple | Scores | Dance | Music | Result |
|---|---|---|---|---|
| Connor & Rylee | 24 (8, 8, 8) | Jive | "Blue Suede Shoes" — Elvis Presley | Safe |
| Connor & Rylee | 24 (8, 8, 8) | Quickstep | "Dance, Dance" — Fall Out Boy | Safe |
| Harry & Jenna | 30 (10, 10, 10) | Paso doble | "We Found Love" — Rihanna feat. Calvin Harris | Eliminated |
| Harry & Jenna | 30 (10, 10, 10) | Quickstep | "Valerie" — Mark Ronson feat. Amy Winehouse | Eliminated |
| Maura & Mark | 30 (10, 10, 10) | Samba | "Samba Vocalizado" — Luciano Perrone | Safe |
| Maura & Mark | 29 (9, 10, 10) | Viennese waltz | "Shrike" — Hozier | Safe |
| Ezra & Daniella | 27 (9, 9, 9) | Quickstep | "Kryptonite" — 3 Doors Down | Safe |
| Ezra & Daniella | 30 (10, 10, 10) | Jive | "Footloose" — Kenny Loggins | Safe |
| Amber & Pasha | 30 (10, 10, 10) | Salsa | "Bemba Colorá" — Celia Cruz | Safe |
| Amber & Pasha | 30 (10, 10, 10) | Viennese waltz | "Dangerous Woman" — Ariana Grande | Safe |
| Tatyana & Jan | 27 (9, 9, 9) | Waltz | "Open Arms" — Journey | Safe |
| Tatyana & Jan | 28 (10, 9, 9) | Cha-cha-cha | "I Like It Like That" — Pete Rodriguez | Safe |

=== Week 11: Finale ===
For the three-hour season finale, each couple will perform three dances: a redemption dance selected and coached by one of the judges, an instant dance, and their freestyle routine. It will air live across the United States for the first time in the series' history, allowing viewers living in the Western States to watch and vote in real time. For the instant dance round, the couples will have approximately five minutes to choreograph and learn a new dance before performing it live.

The opening number will be set to "One More Time" by Daft Punk. The pros and troupe members that will be joining the 2027 Dancing with the Stars: Live tour will perform a number to "It's Not Right but It's Okay (Thunderpuss Mix)" by Whitney Houston. All of the couples from the season will return for additional performances to "Fame Is a Gun" by Addison Rae, "Electricity" by Silk City & Dua Lipa feat. Mark Ronson & Diplo, "Lil Boo Thang" by Paul Russell, and "Sunshine" by Jungle. Season thirty-four champions Robert Irwin and Witney Carson will return for a performance to "Free Bird" by Lynyrd Skynyrd and will present the Len Goodman Mirrorball Trophy to the new champions. Additional pro and troupe performances will be set to "Make You Feel My Love" by Adele and "Melatonin" by Tinashe. The Eras Tour dancers Tori Evans and Raphael Thomas will perform during Tatyana's Freestyle.

Couples are listed in the order they performed.

Dancing with the Stars (season 35) – Week 11
| Couple | Judge | Scores | Dance | Music | Result |
|---|---|---|---|---|---|
| Amber & Pasha | Derek Hough | | Quickstep | "Sing, Sing, Sing" — Louis Prima | |
| Amber & Pasha | Derek Hough | | TBA | TBA | |
| Amber & Pasha | Derek Hough | | Freestyle | "Like a Prayer" & "Music" — Madonna | |
| Connor & Rylee | Carrie Ann Inaba | | Viennese waltz | "Willing and Able" — Noah Kahan | |
| Connor & Rylee | Carrie Ann Inaba | | TBA | TBA | |
| Connor & Rylee | Carrie Ann Inaba | | Freestyle | "Singin' in the Rain" — Gene Kelly & "Umbrella" — Rihanna | |
| Ezra & Daniella | Bruno Tonioli | | Salsa | "Danza Kuduro" — Don Omar feat. Lucenzo | |
| Ezra & Daniella | Bruno Tonioli | | TBA | TBA | |
| Ezra & Daniella | Bruno Tonioli | | Freestyle | "Numb" — Linkin Park | |
| Maura & Mark | Bruno Tonioli | | Tango | "Gallo Ciego" — Orquesta Color Tango | |
| Maura & Mark | Bruno Tonioli | | TBA | TBA | |
| Maura & Mark | Bruno Tonioli | | Freestyle | "Diamonds Are a Girl's Best Friend" — Marilyn Monroe & "The Parting Glass" / "Flowers of Red Hill" | |
| Tatyana & Jan | Carrie Ann Inaba | | Salsa | "Jamaican (Bam Bam)" — Hugel & Solto | |
| Tatyana & Jan | Carrie Ann Inaba | | TBA | TBA | |
| Tatyana & Jan | Carrie Ann Inaba | | Freestyle | "Minnie the Moocher" — Cab Calloway & "Over the Rainbow" — Judy Garland | |

== Dance chart ==
The couples performed the following each week:

- Weeks 1–7: One unlearned dance
- Week 8: One unlearned dance & team dance
- Week 9 (Quarterfinals): One unlearned dance & dance-off
- Week 10 (Semifinals): One unlearned ballroom dance & one unlearned Latin dance
- Week 11 (Finale): Judges' choice, instant dance & freestyle

Dancing with the Stars (season 35) — Dance chart
| Couple | Week | | | | | | | | | | | | | | | |
| Couple | 1 | 2 | 3 | 4 | 5 | 6 | 7 | 8 | | 9 | | 10 | | 11 | | |
|---|---|---|---|---|---|---|---|---|---|---|---|---|---|---|---|---|
| Amber & Pasha | Cha-cha-cha | Tango | Foxtrot | Rumba | Samba | Contemp. | Argentine tango | Quickstep | Team Freestyle | Paso doble | Rumba | Salsa | Viennese waltz | Quickstep | TBA | Freestyle |
| Connor W. & Rylee | Cha-cha-cha | Tango | Foxtrot | Rumba | Samba | Viennese waltz | Contemp. | Waltz | Team Freestyle | Argentine tango | Cha-cha-cha | Jive | Quickstep | Viennese waltz | TBA | Freestyle |
| Ezra & Daniella | Tango | Cha-cha-cha | Foxtrot | Rumba | Salsa | Contemp. | Jazz | Samba | Team Freestyle | Argentine tango | Rumba | Quickstep | Jive | Salsa | TBA | Freestyle |
| Maura & Mark | Foxtrot | Cha-cha-cha | Quickstep | Waltz | Tango | Paso doble | Contemp. | Jive | Team Freestyle | Argentine tango | Cha-cha-cha | Samba | Viennese waltz | Tango | TBA | Freestyle |
| Tatyana & Jan | Jive | Foxtrot | Quickstep | Jazz | Salsa | Viennese waltz | Paso doble | Contemp. | Team Freestyle | Tango | Cha-cha-cha | Waltz | Cha-cha-cha | Salsa | TBA | Freestyle |
| Harry & Jenna | Cha-cha-cha | Viennese waltz | Jive | Tango | Samba | Foxtrot | Contemp. | Jazz | Team Freestyle | Salsa | Immunity | Paso doble | Quickstep | | | |
| Jenna & Val | Tango | Jive | Samba | Rumba | Paso doble | Viennese waltz | Argentine tango | Quickstep | Team Freestyle | Jazz | Cha-cha-cha | | | | | |
| Julia & Ezra | Quickstep | Tango | Salsa | Viennese waltz | Jazz | Contemp. | Argentine tango | Paso doble | Team Freestyle | | | | | | | |
| Jackson & Emma | Cha-cha-cha | Foxtrot | Paso doble | Waltz | Salsa | Quickstep | Contemp. | | | | | | | | | |
| Tyler & Sharna | Tango | Salsa | Jive | Foxtrot | Jazz | Contemp. | Viennese waltz | | | | | | | | | |
| Guillermo & Witney | Cha-cha-cha | Paso doble | Foxtrot | Samba | Salsa | | | | | | | | | | | |
| Ciara & Brandon | Foxtrot | Tango | Cha-cha-cha | Jazz | | | | | | | | | | | | |
| Taylor & Britt | Quickstep | Cha-cha-cha | Foxtrot | | | | | | | | | | | | | |
| Giada & Alan | Tango | Salsa | | | | | | | | | | | | | | |
| Sarah Jane & Hailey | Jive | | | | | | | | | | | | | | | |
| Conner L. & Adele | Salsa | | | | | | | | | | | | | | | |
