= Britt Stewart =

American professional dancer (born 1989)

- Stewart in 2026
- Born: Britt Benae Stewart; September 21, 1989 (age 37); Aurora, Colorado, U.S.
- Other name: Britt Stewart Durant
- Education: Denver School of the Arts; Loyola Marymount University
- Occupations: Dancer; choreographer; teacher
- Years active: 2006–present
- Television: Dancing with the Stars
- Spouse: Daniel Durant (m. 2025)

Britt Benae Stewart Durant (née Stewart; born September 21, 1989) is an American professional dancer, choreographer, and teacher. Best known for her appearances on the reality competition program Dancing with the Stars, she is the first African American woman to be cast on the series as a pro.

== Early life ==
Britt Benae Durant was born on September 21, 1989, in Aurora, Colorado, and lived in Seattle, Washington for some time after her birth. Both of her parents worked in business and were unfamiliar with dance, but they enrolled her in classes when she was three after a stranger at an outdoor music festival noticed her moving to the music. Stewart's training began with ballet and tap at a local school in Seattle. After her family moved back to Colorado, she continued training at the Artistic Fusion Dance Academy, a competition studio. As a result of her studies, Stewart is also trained in jazz, contemporary, and hip-hop.

Despite her extensive dance education, Stewart originally aspired to become a pediatric surgeon. She studied modern and cultural dance styles at the Denver School of the Arts, where she graduated in 2007. She then attended Loyola Marymount University as a double major in dance and science, but she suspended her studies halfway through her second semester.

== Career ==
Stewart appeared in Kenny Ortega's trilogy of High School Musical films as a principal dancer (2006–2008). She later performed in Fame (2009), No Strings Attached (2011), Teen Beach Movie (2013), and La La Land (2016). On television, Stewart booked shows such as American Idol, Bunheads, A Capitol Fourth, Dancing Fools, Gilmore Girls, Glee, Grey's Anatomy, and The Voice. She toured and performed with several musicians, including Janet Jackson, Rihanna, Annie Lennox, Katy Perry, Selena Gomez, Florence and the Machine, Demi Lovato, and Nick Jonas.

=== 2016–present: Dancing with the Stars ===
Producers from the reality competition series Dancing with the Stars watched Stewart perform as she was rehearsing for The Wonderful World of Disney: Disneyland 60 (2016) and asked her to audition for their troupe. Six months later, she made her series debut on season 23 without any formal training in ballroom dance. Stewart became a full-time troupe member the following season, and remained in that role until the troupe was cut for season 28. On August 18, 2020, she was named the first Black female pro in Dancing with the Stars history.

For season 29, Stewart was partnered with Olympic figure skater Johnny Weir. They reached the semi-finals and were eliminated on November 16, 2020, in a double elimination alongside Skai Jackson and Alan Bersten. Weir and Stewart finished in sixth place.

For season 30, Stewart was partnered with film and television actor Martin Kove. They were the first couple eliminated from the competition, finishing in fifteenth place on September 27, 2021; Stewart's lowest placement to date.

For season 31, Stewart was partnered with deaf film and television actor Daniel Durant. They reached the semi-finals and were eliminated on November 14, 2022, in a double elimination alongside Trevor Donovan and Emma Slater. Durant and Stewart finished in fifth place; Stewart's highest placement to date.

For season 32, Stewart was partnered with NFL running back Adrian Peterson. His casting was panned by audience viewers due to his history of legal issues, which includes arrests for child abuse and domestic violence. Peterson and Stewart were ultimately eliminated on October 17, 2023, during the fourth week of competition, finishing in eleventh place.

For season 33, Stewart was partnered with film and television actor Eric Roberts. They were eliminated during the third week of competition on October 8, 2024, in a double elimination alongside Reginald VelJohnson and Emma Slater. Both couples finished in tenth place.

For season 34, Stewart was partnered with NBA point guard Baron Davis. They were eliminated during the second week of competition on September 23, 2025, in a double elimination alongside Corey Feldman and Jenna Johnson. Both couples finished in thirteenth place.

For season 35, Stewart was partnered with musician Taylor Hanson of the pop rock band Hanson. Despite receiving their best score, the couple were unexpectedly eliminated during the third week of competition on September 30, 2026, finishing in thirteenth place.

Season	Partner	Place	Average
29	Johnny Weir	6th	25.1
30	Martin Kove	15th	14.0*
31	Daniel Durant	5th	24.8*
32	Adrian Peterson	11th	17.5
33	Eric Roberts	10th	16.0
34	Baron Davis	13th	16.5*
35	Taylor Hanson	13th	16.3

- Scores out of 40 are adjusted to be out of 30.*

==== Season 29 ====
Celebrity partner: Johnny Weir

Week	Dance	Music	Judges' scores (Note: Individual judges' scores are listed in the following order: Carrie Ann Inaba, Derek Hough, Bruno Tonioli.)			Total score	Result
1	Cha-cha-cha	"Buttons" — The Pussycat Dolls	6	6	6	18	Safe
2	Tango	"Poker Face" — Lady Gaga	6	6	6	18	Safe
3	Rumba	"Reflection" — Christina Aguilera	8	8	8	24	Safe
4	Jive	"Crocodile Rock" — Elton John	8	8	8	24	Safe
5	Contemporary	"Total Eclipse of the Heart" — Bonnie Tyler	10	10	9	29	Safe
6	Salsa	"On the Floor" — Jennifer Lopez, feat. Pitbull	7	8	7	22	Bottom two
7	Viennese waltz	"Creep" — Vincint	9	9	9	27	Safe
8	Foxtrot	"Wonder" — Shawn Mendes	9	9	9	27	Safe
8	Viennese waltz (Dance relay)	"I Have Nothing" — Whitney Houston	—N/a			3 (Note: Johnny and Britt received three bonus points for this dance relay.)	Safe
9	Quickstep	"Valerie" — Amy Winehouse, feat. Mark Ronson	10	10	10	30	Bottom two
9	Jive (Dance-off)	"Wake Me Up Before You Go-Go" — Wham!	Loser			0 (Note: Johnny and Britt received zero bonus points for losing this dance-off.)	Bottom two
10	Salsa	"X" — Jonas Brothers & Karol G	9	9	9	27	Eliminated
10	Jazz	"I Lived" — OneRepublic	10	10	10	30	Eliminated

==== Season 30 ====
Celebrity partner: Martin Kove

Week	Dance	Music	Judges' scores (Note: Individual judges' scores are listed in the following order: Carrie Ann Inaba, Len Goodman, Derek Hough, Bruno Tonioli.)				Total score	Result
1	Paso doble	"You're the Best" — Joe Esposito	4	3	3	3	13	Safe
2	Cha-cha-cha	"Twist and Shout" — The Isley Brothers	4	3	4	4	15	Eliminated

==== Season 31 ====
Celebrity partner: Daniel Durant

Week	Dance	Music	Judges' scores (Note: Individual judges' scores are listed in the following order: Carrie Ann Inaba, Len Goodman, Derek Hough, Bruno Tonioli.)				Total score	Result
1	Tango	"Barbra Streisand" — Duck Sauce	7	6	7	7	27	Safe
2	Jive	"King Creole" — Elvis Presley	7	7	7	8	29	Safe
3	Rumba	"The World Is Not Enough" — Garbage	8	7	8	8	31	Safe
4	Quickstep	"Finally Free" — Joshua Bassett	7	7	7	8	29	Safe
5 (Night 1)	Contemporary	"Both Sides, Now" — Joni Mitchell	8	8	9	9	34	Safe
5 (Night 2)	Cha-cha-cha	"SexyBack" — Justin Timberlake, feat. Timbaland	8	8	8	8	32	Safe
5 (Night 2)	Hustle & Lindy Hop; Marathon	"Hot Stuff" — Donna Summer & "Jump, Jive an' Wail" — The Brian Setzer Orchestra	—N/a				1 (Note: Daniel and Britt received one point in this dance marathon.)	Safe
6	Foxtrot	"Feeling Good" — Michael Bublé	9	8	8	9	43 (Note: Daniel and Britt also received a score of 9 from guest judge Michael Bublé.)	Safe
7	Paso doble	"Bury a Friend" — Billie Eilish	8	8	9	9	34	Safe
7	Freestyle (Team Scream)	"Heads Will Roll" — Yeah Yeah Yeahs	10	9	10	10	39	Safe
8	Jazz	"Enjoy the Silence" — Depeche Mode	10	9	10	10	39	Safe
8	Cha-cha-cha (Dance relay)	"Ice Ice Baby" — Vanilla Ice	Loser				0 (Note: Daniel and Britt received zero points for losing this dance relay.)	Safe
9	Viennese waltz	"Surprise Yourself" — Jack Garratt	9	8	9	9	35	Eliminated
9	Samba	"Light It Up (Remix)" — Major Lazer, feat. Nyla & Fuse ODG	9	8	9	8	34	Eliminated

==== Season 32 ====
Celebrity partner: Adrian Peterson

Week	Dance	Music	Judges' scores (Note: Individual judges' scores are listed in the following order: Carrie Ann Inaba, Derek Hough, Bruno Tonioli.)			Total score	Result
1	Salsa	"Yeah!" — Usher	6	6	6	18	Safe
2	Samba	"Taki Taki" — DJ Snake, feat. Selena Gomez, Ozuna & Cardi B	5	5	5	15	Bottom two
3	Quickstep	"You Can't Hurry Love" — The Supremes	5	5	6	22 (Note: Adrian and Britt also received a score of 6 from guest judge Michael Strahan.)	Safe
4	Viennese waltz	"Baby Mine" (from Dumbo)	7	7	7	21	Eliminated

==== Season 33 ====
Celebrity partner: Eric Roberts

Week	Dance	Music	Judges' scores (Note: Individual judges' scores are listed in the following order: Carrie Ann Inaba, Derek Hough, Bruno Tonioli.)			Total score	Result
1	Cha-cha-cha	"Old Time Rock and Roll" — Bob Seger	5	5	5	15	Safe
2	Waltz	"Main Title (The Godfather Waltz)" — Nino Rota & Carlo Savina	6	4	5	15	Safe
3	Foxtrot	"Let's Stay Together" — Al Green	7	5	6	24 (Note: Eric and Britt also received a score of 6 from guest judge Rosie Perez.)	Safe
4	Paso Doble	"Cherry Pie" — Warrant	6	5	5	22 (Note: Eric and Britt also received a score of 6 from guest judge Gene Simmons.)	Eliminated

==== Season 34 ====
Celebrity partner: Baron Davis

Week	Dance	Music	Judges' scores (Note: Individual judges' scores are listed in the following order: Carrie Ann Inaba, Derek Hough, Bruno Tonioli.)			Total score	Result
1	Cha-cha-cha	"U Can't Touch This" — MC Hammer	(Note: Carrie Ann Inaba was absent due to being sick and there was no replacement for her.)	5	5	10	Safe
2	Samba	"Return of the Mack" — Mark Morrison	6	6	6	18	Eliminated

==== Season 35 ====
Celebrity partner: Taylor Hanson

Week	Dance	Music	Judges' scores			Total score	Result
1	Quickstep	"Tell Her About It" — Billy Joel	6	5	5	16	Safe
2	Cha-cha-cha	"Cake by the Ocean" — DNCE	5	5	5	15	Safe
3	Foxtrot	"What a Fool Believes" — The Doobie Brothers	6	6	6	18	Eliminated

== Personal life ==
Stewart entered a romantic relationship with her Dancing with the Stars partner Daniel Durant in November 2022, shortly after his stint on the competition series ended. As Durant has been deaf since birth, she made the decision to learn American Sign Language to communicate with him. They got engaged on Christmas Eve 2023 during a hike in Lake Arrowhead, California.

Stewart and Durant were married on August 23, 2025, in Santa Margarita, California. A number of their friends from the entertainment industry attended the ceremony; Johnny Weir, Stewart's first Dancing with the Stars partner, served as one of her bridesmaids.

=== Philanthropy and advocacy ===
Stewart is the president and mentor of Share The Movement, a nonprofit organization dedicated to increasing diversity in the professional dance community by providing financial, educational, and inspirational support to promising young BIPOC dancers. Since launching in 2021, Share The Movement has provided over $30,000 in summer scholarships to BIPOC students from around the world to various elite training programs. These scholarships provide opportunities to train at prestigious dance schools and participate in workshops and performances. In addition, their mentorship program connects dancers with industry leaders, fostering growth and professional development.

== Filmography ==
=== Film ===
Year	Title	Role	Notes
2008	High School Musical 3: Senior Year	Principal Dancer	
2009	Fame	Dancer	
2011	No Strings Attached	Secret High Dancer	
2011	Girl Walks into a Bar	Dancer	
2012	Silver Linings Playbook	Lottie - Bald Man's Girl	Uncredited extra
2014	Let's Be Cops	Woman with Broken Arm	Uncredited extra
2015	The Prismatic World Tour Live	Backup Dancer	Concert film
2016	La La Land	Traffic Dancer	
2021	Being the Ricardos	Ciro's Dancer	

=== Television ===
Year	Title	Role	Notes
2006	High School Musical	Cheerleader Dancer	TV Movie
2007	High School Musical 2	Principal Dancer	TV Movie
2012	Fred 3: Camp Fred	Geometry Kid #2	TV Movie
2012	Glee	Dancer	Season 4, episode 1; "The New Rachel"
2013	Teen Beach Movie	Dancer	TV Movie
2016–present	Dancing with the Stars	Herself	Troupe Member; Seasons 23-27 Professional Dancer/Choreographer; Seasons 29-present
2018	Hit the Floor	Dancer	Season 4, episode 8; "Final Seconds"
2019	The Little Mermaid Live!	Cast	Television Special
2020	Zoey's Extraordinary Playlist	Crowd Dancer #5	Uncredited extra
2024	A Capitol Fourth	Herself	Television Special
2026	Dancing with the Stars: The Next Pro	Guest Judge/Mentor	Season 1, episode 3; "You're Only as Strong as Your Weakest Link: Group Work with Britt Stewart"
2026	Project Runway	Herself	Season 22, episode 8; "Designing with the Stars"

=== Music videos ===
Year	Title	Artist(s)	Ref.
2008	"Sneakernight"	Vanessa Hudgens	
2011	"All I Want Is Everything"	Victoria Justice	
2014	"Dark Horse"	Katy Perry & Juicy J	
