= Dancing with the Stars: The Next Pro =

American reality competition television series

- Genre: Reality competition
- Based on: Dancing with the Stars
- Directed by: Justin Mabardi
- Presented by: Robert Irwin; Witney Carson
- Judges: Mark Ballas; Shirley Ballas
- Country of origin: United States
- Original language: English
- No. of seasons: 1
- No. of episodes: 8

Production
- Executive producers: Conrad Green; Ryan O'Dowd; Krystal Whitney; Alex Cross; Jenny Groom
- Production locations: Brisbane, Queensland, Australia
- Production company: BBC Studios

Original release
- Network: ABC
- Release: July 13, 2026 – present

Related
- Dancing with the Stars; Strictly Come Dancing

Dancing with the Stars: The Next Pro (also colloquially known as The Next Pro) is an American reality dance competition television series that premiered on ABC on July 13, 2026, with next-day streaming available on Hulu and Disney+. It is a spin-off of the competition series Dancing with the Stars, which is based on the British contest show Strictly Come Dancing, and an expansion of its international franchise.

The series featured twelve up-and-coming professional dancers who lived and trained together in Brisbane. Over the season's eight episodes, contestants were challenged on technique, teamwork, choreography, chemistry, storytelling, and teaching ability. With eliminations each week, they competed against each other to ultimately determine who would join the flagship series as a pro. The series was presented by Robert Irwin, who won the thirty-fourth season of Dancing with the Stars. Three-time mirrorball champion Mark Ballas and Strictly Come Dancing head judge Shirley Ballas served as main judges; a third judges slot was filled by a rotating guest each week.

The series premiere reached 5.33 million viewers over three days across ABC, Hulu, and Disney+ platforms, marking ABC's best summer debut in six years. A second season of The Next Pro is currently in early development.

== Contestants ==
Television advertisements featuring the twelve contestants were released on April 22, 2026.

Cast of Dancing with the Stars: The Next Pro
Dancer	Age	Residence	Dance style(s)	Status	Ref.
Briar Nolet	27	Los Angeles, California	Commercial	Eliminated 1st & 2nd on July 13, 2026	
Jake Monreal	22	Miami, Florida	Latin	Eliminated 1st & 2nd on July 13, 2026	
Benjamin "Benji" Castro	25	Miami, Florida	Latin / Commercial	Eliminated 3rd on July 20, 2026	
Natalie Jolley	20	New York, New York	Ballroom	Withdrew on July 27, 2026	
Tristen Sanders	28	Atlanta, Georgia	Ballroom / Hip-hop	Eliminated 4th & 5th on August 3, 2026	
Stephani Sosa	26	Los Angeles, California	Ballroom / Commercial	Eliminated 4th & 5th on August 3, 2026	
Erik Linder	26	Tampa, Florida	Latin	Eliminated 6th on August 10, 2026	
Nina Mayster	28	Philadelphia, Pennsylvania	Latin	Eliminated 7th on August 17, 2026	
Allen Genkin	36	San Jose, California	Latin	Eliminated 8th on August 24, 2026	
Selena Hamilton	21	Los Angeles, California	Commercial	Third place on August 31, 2026	
AJ Pritchard	31	London, United Kingdom	Ballroom / Latin	Runner-up on August 31, 2026	
Adele Zaikman	24	Los Angeles, California	Latin	Winner on August 31, 2026	

== Episodes ==
No. overall	No. in season	Title	Rating (18–49)	Original release date	U.S. viewers (millions)
1	1	"The Journey Begins: Technique with Derek Hough"	TBA	July 13, 2026	N/A
2	2	"Stories Without Words: Storytelling with Brandon Armstrong"	TBA	July 20, 2026	N/A
3	3	"You're Only as Strong as Your Weakest Link: Group Work with Britt Stewart"	TBA	July 27, 2026	N/A
4	4	"Bring on the Intensity: Chemistry with Jenna Johnson"	TBA	August 3, 2026	N/A
5	5	""Wow" Moments with Daniella Karagach"	TBA	August 10, 2026	N/A
6	6	"But Can You Teach? Coaching Superfans with Witney Carson"	TBA	August 17, 2026	N/A
7	7	"Paired with the Pros: Semi-Finals with Kym Johnson"	TBA	August 24, 2026	N/A
8	8	"The Final Step: Finale with Derek Hough and Witney Carson"	TBA	August 31, 2026	N/A

== Elimination chart ==
Color key:

Winner
Runner-up
Third place
In Jeopardy
Withdrew from competition
Eliminated

Dancing with the Stars: The Next Pro - Elimination chart
Contestant	Pl.	Week								
Contestant	Pl.	1	2	3		4	5	6	7	8
Adele	1st	Safe	Safe	Safe	Safe	Safe	Safe	Safe	Safe	Winner
AJ	2nd	Safe	Safe	Safe	Safe	Safe	Safe	Safe	Safe	Runner-up
Selena	3rd	Safe	Safe	Safe	In Jeopardy	Safe	In Jeopardy	In Jeopardy	Safe	Third place
Allen	4th	Safe	Safe	Safe	Safe	In Jeopardy	Safe	Safe	Eliminated	
Nina	5th	Safe	In Jeopardy	In Jeopardy	Safe	In Jeopardy	Safe	Eliminated		
Erik	6th	Safe	Safe	Safe	Safe	Safe	Eliminated			
Stephani	7th	Safe	Safe	Safe	Safe	Eliminated				
Tristen	7th	In Jeopardy	Safe	In Jeopardy	In Jeopardy	Eliminated				
Natalie	9th	In Jeopardy	Safe	Withdrew (Note: Natalie suffered an injury during rehearsals and was not medically cleared to compete.)						
Benji	10th	Safe	Eliminated							
Briar	11th	Eliminated								
Jake	11th	Eliminated								

== Weekly results ==
=== Week 1: The Journey Begins: Technique with Derek Hough ===
Contestants were placed in same-sex couples at random and tested on basic technique. Six-time mirrorball champion and current Dancing with the Stars judge Derek Hough appeared as a guest judge and mentor. He performed a demonstration routine set to "Baianá" by Barbatuques with professional dancer Lily Cornish, who won the Australian iteration of Dancing with the Stars twice.

The male couples performed the jive, while the female couples performed the samba. Each performance featured a solo section choreographed by the contestants, and a side-by-side section choreographed and taught by Hough. The contestants were judged individually; the worst-performing male and female dancers, as chosen by the judges, were eliminated.

Couples are listed in the order they performed.

Dancing with the Stars: The Next Pro – Week 1
Dancer	Dance	Music	Result
Erik	Jive	"APT." – Rosé & Bruno Mars	Safe
Tristen	Jive	"APT." – Rosé & Bruno Mars	In Jeopardy
Jake	Jive	"What I Like About You" – 5 Seconds of Summer	Eliminated
AJ	Jive	"What I Like About You" – 5 Seconds of Summer	Safe
Benji	Jive	"Blinding Lights" – The Weeknd	Safe
Allen	Jive	"Blinding Lights" – The Weeknd	Safe
Selena	Samba	"Bzrp Music Sessions, Vol. 0/66" – Bizarrap & Daddy Yankee	Safe
Natalie	Samba	"Bzrp Music Sessions, Vol. 0/66" – Bizarrap & Daddy Yankee	In Jeopardy
Briar	Samba	"Mi Gente" – J Balvin & Willy William	Eliminated
Stephani	Samba	"Mi Gente" – J Balvin & Willy William	Safe
Adele	Samba	"Hips Don't Lie" – Shakira feat. Wyclef Jean	Safe
Nina	Samba	"Hips Don't Lie" – Shakira feat. Wyclef Jean	Safe

=== Week 2: Stories Without Words: Storytelling with Brandon Armstrong ===
Contestants were placed in opposite-sex couples at random and were tasked to share a personal story through dance. Dancing with the Stars finalist Brandon Armstrong appeared as a guest judge and mentor. He performed a demonstration routine with Lily Cornish set to "Rescue" by Lauren Daigle, which was based on his experience being adopted into a white family.

After deciding whose story to tell, the couples selected a dance style and choreographed the routine together. On the day before the performance, host Robert Irwin had a heart-to-heart conversation with Allen to help him emotionally process his and Adele's routine. The couple with the least compelling performance, as chosen by the judges, were placed in jeopardy; one dancer from that couple was eliminated.

Couples are listed in the order they performed.

Dancing with the Stars: The Next Pro – Week 2
Dancer	Dance	Music	Result
Erik	Viennese waltz	"Hold My Hand" – Lady Gaga (Note: This routine was inspired by Natalie's story of finding her voice through dance after moving from Hong Kong to the United States as a child.)	Safe
Natalie	Viennese waltz	"Hold My Hand" – Lady Gaga	Safe
Benji	Rumba	"Sign of the Times" – Harry Styles (Note: This routine was inspired by Nina's story of perseverance in her professional and personal lives.)	Eliminated
Nina	Rumba	"Sign of the Times" – Harry Styles	In Jeopardy
Tristen	Rumba	"Dreaming of You" – Selena (Note: This routine was inspired by Stephani's story of embracing her Latina heritage during her childhood in a predominately white community.)	Safe
Stephani	Rumba	"Dreaming of You" – Selena	Safe
AJ	Jive	"Runaway Baby" – Bruno Mars (Note: This routine was inspired by AJ's story of winning the 2015 British Open Dance Championships.)	Safe
Selena	Jive	"Runaway Baby" – Bruno Mars	Safe
Allen	Rumba	"See You Again (Piano)" – Charlie Puth (Note: This routine was inspired by Allen's story of the death of his mother, who inspired him to pursue dance, when he was 15 years old.)	Safe
Adele	Rumba	"See You Again (Piano)" – Charlie Puth	Safe

=== Week 3: You're Only as Strong as Your Weakest Link: Group Work with Britt Stewart ===
Contestants were tested on their teamwork skills with group dances. Two-time Dancing with the Stars semi-finalist Britt Stewart appeared as a guest judge and mentor. She performed a demonstration routine to "All Shook Up" by Whissell with an assortment of professional dancers. For their first challenge, contestants worked together to learn the choreography to Stewart's routine in three hours; which is also the amount of time Dancing with the Stars pros have to learn and perform an opening number during every live episode. They performed on-the-spot for the judges, who singled out the two worst-performing dancers.

Because Nina and Tristen were declared the weakest performers, they served as team captains for the second challenge: creating their own group performance. They were allowed to choose their team members and were given a dance style to choreograph: either the paso doble or the tango. The team that impressed the judges the most were safe from elimination. Natalie suffered a black eye and a concussion during rehearsals for the first challenge. She was not medically cleared to return to the competition, forcing her to be eliminated by default.

Groups are listed in the order they performed.

Dancing with the Stars: The Next Pro – Week 3
Dancer	Dance	Music	Result
Adele	Paso doble	"All Shook Up" – Whissell	Safe
AJ	Paso doble	"All Shook Up" – Whissell	Safe
Allen	Paso doble	"All Shook Up" – Whissell	Safe
Erik	Paso doble	"All Shook Up" – Whissell	Safe
Nina	Paso doble	"All Shook Up" – Whissell	In Jeopardy
Selena	Paso doble	"All Shook Up" – Whissell	Safe
Stephani	Paso doble	"All Shook Up" – Whissell	Safe
Tristen	Paso doble	"All Shook Up" – Whissell	In Jeopardy
Natalie	—N/a		Withdrew (Note: Natalie suffered an injury during rehearsals and was not medically cleared to compete.)
Erik	Paso doble	"Are You Gonna Go My Way" – Lenny Kravitz	Safe
Selena	Paso doble	"Are You Gonna Go My Way" – Lenny Kravitz	In Jeopardy
Stephani	Paso doble	"Are You Gonna Go My Way" – Lenny Kravitz	Safe
Tristen	Paso doble	"Are You Gonna Go My Way" – Lenny Kravitz	In Jeopardy
Adele	Tango	"Into You (3lau Remix)" – Ariana Grande	Safe
AJ	Tango	"Into You (3lau Remix)" – Ariana Grande	Safe
Allen	Tango	"Into You (3lau Remix)" – Ariana Grande	Safe
Nina	Tango	"Into You (3lau Remix)" – Ariana Grande	Safe

=== Week 4: Bring on the Intensity: Chemistry with Jenna Johnson ===
Contestants were tested on their trust and chemistry with intimate performances. Two-time mirrorball champion Jenna Johnson appeared as a guest judge and mentor. She performed a demonstration routine to "You Don't Own Me" by Nikki Williams with professional dancer Jarryd Byrne, who won the Australian iteration of Dancing with the Stars once.

Johnson instructed the contestants to dance with each other in a form of speed dating to see who had the most natural chemistry. She then asked the female dancers to select the male dancer they wanted to work with. If more than one woman chose the same man, he was allowed to choose his partner; the other woman was given the chance to reselect. Nina and Stephani both selected Allen and no one selected Tristen. Allen ultimately chose Nina as his partner, and Stephani chose Tristen. From there, the couples randomly drew a dance style, either the rumba or the Argentine tango, and accompanying music. They choreographed the routines and were also allowed to spend time together outside of rehearsals. The couple who presented the weakest performance was eliminated from the competition.

Couples are listed in the order they performed.

Dancing with the Stars: The Next Pro – Week 4
Couple	Dance	Music	Result
Adele & AJ	Rumba	"You've Got Another Thing Coming" – Teddy Swims	Safe
Erik & Selena	Argentine tango	"Human" – Rag'n'Bone Man	Safe
Stephani & Tristen	Rumba	"Back to Friends" – Sombr	Eliminated
Allen & Nina	Argentine tango	"Down" – Marian Hill	In Jeopardy

=== Week 5: "Wow" Moments with Daniella Karagach ===
Contestants were challenged to impress the judges with contemporary routines that incorporated a viral move from Dancing with the Stars and featured an original "wow" moment. Mirrorball champion Daniella Karagach appeared as a guest judge and mentor. She performed a demonstration routine with Jarryd Byrne set to "Everybody Wants to Rule the World" by Lorde.

Host Robert Irwin took the contestants to Australia Zoo before rehearsals started to gain choreography inspiration from animals. In a spin from the previous week, Karagach asked the male dancers to select the female dancer they wanted to work with. If more than one man chose the same woman, she was allowed to select her partner. Erik and AJ both selected Selena and no one selected Nina. Selena ultimately chose Erik as her partner, and AJ was then paired with Nina. The couple who failed to deliver a "wow" moment, as chosen by the judges, was placed in jeopardy; one dancer from that couple was eliminated.

Couples are listed in the order they performed.

Dancing with the Stars: The Next Pro – Week 5
Dancer	Dance	Music	Result
AJ	Contemporary	"Human" – Christina Perri	Safe
Nina	Contemporary	"Human" – Christina Perri	Safe
Adele	Contemporary	"All That Really Matters" – Illenium & Teddy Swims	Safe
Allen	Contemporary	"All That Really Matters" – Illenium & Teddy Swims	Safe
Erik	Contemporary	"You Stole the Show" – Sienna Spiro	Eliminated
Selena	Contemporary	"You Stole the Show" – Sienna Spiro	In Jeopardy

=== Week 6: But Can You Teach? Coaching Superfans with Witney Carson ===
The five quarter-finalists were given two days to teach an amateur celebrity dancer a ballroom routine for a spot in the semi-finals. Two-time mirrorball champion Witney Carson appeared as a guest judge and mentor. She performed a demonstration routine with Jarryd Byrne set to "She Wants to Move" by N.E.R.D.

Host Robert Irwin introduced the contestants to five superfans of Dancing with the Stars who had some dance experience, but not in ballroom. The pairings were decided at random and each couple were assigned one of the five standard ballroom styles to coach and perform. On the night before the performance, Carson met with each superfan to learn their progress, their relationships with the contestants, and their confidence levels going into show night. The contestant who presented the weakest choreography and teaching abilities was eliminated.

Couples are listed in the order they performed.

Celebrity fans of Dancing with the Stars: The Next Pro
Celebrity	Notability	Professional partner	Ref.
Zaira Ladisla	Social media personality	Allen Genkin	
Bailey McKnight	YouTuber	AJ Pritchard	
Anthony Riccardo	Social media personality	Adele Zaikman	
Jeremy Urann	Actor and model	Selena Hamilton	
Jay Wyson	Social media personality	Nina Mayster	

Dancing with the Stars: The Next Pro – Week 6
Couple	Dance	Music	Result
Nina & Jay	Foxtrot	"Man I Need" – Olivia Dean	Eliminated
Adele & Anthony	Tango	"Just Keep Watching" – Tate McRae	Safe
AJ & Bailey	Viennese waltz	"Die for Me" – Zayn	Safe
Allen & Zaira	Waltz	"Consequences (Orchestra)" – Camila Cabello	Safe
Selena & Jeremy	Quickstep	"Such a Night" – Michael Bublé	In Jeopardy

=== Week 7: Paired with the Pros: Semi-Finals with Kym Johnson ===
The four semi-finalists were tasked to choreograph and perform two routines in the span of two days for a spot in the finale. They first performed a Latin routine with a pro on Dancing with the Stars, and later performed a ballroom routine with each other. Rylee Arnold, Gleb Savchenko, Jan Ravnik and Witney Carson appeared to perform with the contestants. The quartet performed a demonstration routine set to "Talk To Me" by Robyn.

Two-time mirrorball champion Kym Johnson appeared as a guest judge and mentor. The semi-finalists randomly drew their partners and dance styles for each routine. In the first round, the contestants were given full creative control of the performance, and the pros were tasked to observe them and report their thoughts and critiques to the judges. No one was placed in jeopardy this week; the contestant who presented the weakest performance was immediately eliminated.

Couples are listed in the order they performed.

Dancing with the Stars: The Next Pro – Week 7 (Round 1)
Couple	Dance	Music
Allen & Witney	Jive	"Shake" – Stephen Sanchez
Selena & Jan	Salsa	"La Mudanza" – Bad Bunny
Adele & Gleb	Samba	"Magalenha" – Sérgio Mendes
AJ & Rylee	Cha-cha-cha	"Lil Boo Thang" – Paul Rusell

Dancing with the Stars: The Next Pro – Week 7 (Round 2)
Dancer	Dance	Music	Result
Allen	Quickstep	"Valerie" – Mark Ronson feat. Amy Winehouse	Eliminated
Selena	Quickstep	"Valerie" – Mark Ronson feat. Amy Winehouse	Safe
AJ	Foxtrot	"Too Sweet" – Hozier	Safe
Adele	Foxtrot	"Too Sweet" – Hozier	Safe

=== Week 8: The Final Step: Finale with Derek Hough and Witney Carson ===
For the title of "Next Pro," the three finalists were given three days to choreograph, teach, and perform two routines with a Dancing with the Stars celebrity finalist in front of a live studio audience. They first performed a routine based on their favorite dance style, and later performed their freestyle routine. Season thirty-one champion Charli D'Amelio, season twenty-nine runner-up Nev Schulman, and season twenty-six champion Adam Rippon appeared to perform with the contestants.

Six-time mirrorball champion Derek Hough appeared as a guest judge, and two-time mirrorball champion Witney Carson co-hosted with Robert Irwin, and was also a guest performer and a guest judge/mentor. The opening number, choreographed by Carson, was set to "Free Yourself (The Alias Remix)" by Jessie Ware.

Couples are listed in the order they performed.

Dancing with the Stars: The Next Pro – Week 8
Couple	Dance	Music	Result
Selena & Adam	Jive	"Candyman" – Christina Aguilera	Third place
Selena & Adam	Freestyle	"Cry Me a River" – Justin Timberlake	Third place
AJ & Charli	Viennese waltz	"Golden Hour" – Jvke	Runner-up
AJ & Charli	Freestyle	"Bad Man" – Pitbull feat. Robin Thicke, Joe Perry & Travis Barker	Runner-up
Adele & Nev	Samba	"Bun Up the Dance" – Dillon Francis & Skrillex	Winner
Adele & Nev	Freestyle	"Natural" – Imagine Dragons	Winner

== Production ==
=== Development ===
The Next Pro was produced by BBC Studios. Conrad Green, the showrunner and executive producer of Dancing with the Stars, reprised his role for the series. Ryan O'Dowd, Krystal Whitney, Alex Cross, and Jenny Groom additionally served as executive producers. Deena Katz, the casting director of Dancing with the Stars, and Quinn Lipton were co-executive producers.

Creating The Next Pro was a priority for Green and Katz, as they wanted to refocus the franchise's energy on "making the [professional] dancer the center of this, because they are the creative hub of the show. There's a huge creative team around them who are super talented, but it's them at the core of it with their choreography, with their passion, with their patience, that drive the whole enterprise." BBC Studios was planning for a second season of The Next Pro by October 2026. Green told TheWrap that discussions with ABC would be required before the series is potentially offered a renewal.

=== Casting ===
A casting call for BBC Studios, who were searching for "standout dancers with world-class technique, star quality, and the ability to light up a stage," was published on social media by The Voice's casting manager Lissette Pinon in October 2025.

Robert Irwin was first approached to host The Next Pro while he was competing on the thirty-fourth season of Dancing with the Stars, which he ultimately won. Three-time mirrorball champion Mark Ballas and his mother Shirley Ballas, the head judge of the British competition program Strictly Come Dancing, were cast to judge the series. A third judges slot was filled with a rotating judge each week. Guest judges include Derek Hough, Witney Carson, Kym Johnson, Britt Stewart, Jenna Johnson, Brandon Armstrong, and Daniella Karagach. The last four guests were performing on the Dancing with the Stars: Live! tour at the time and missed select performances on rotating schedules to participate in The Next Pro. Rylee Arnold, who did not perform as a full-time member in the tour for health reasons, filled in for the pros and also participated in the series.

=== Filming ===
Production for The Next Pro commenced in Brisbane, the capital city of Queensland, Australia, in February 2026, which allowed Irwin to maintain his commitments to Australia Zoo. Filming locations included the Thomas Dixon Centre, home of Queensland Ballet. John-Paul Langbroek, Queensland's Minister for the Arts, reported that The Next Pro contributed A$7.2 million to the state's economy and employed around 110 local cast and crew members. Its release would "showcase Brisbane to an international audience," as it prepared to host the 2032 Summer Olympics and Summer Paralympics.

On October 29, 2026, Peter White of Deadline Hollywood reported that BBC Studios filed the paperwork for a California tax credit to bring production for The Next Pro to Los Angeles, where the flagship series is filmed.

== Dance chart ==
The contestants performed the following each week:

- Week 1: Jive or Samba
- Week 2: Rumba, Jive or Viennese waltz
- Week 3: Two team dances
- Week 4: Rumba or Argentine tango
- Week 5: Contemporary dance
- Week 6 (Quarterfinals): One ballroom dance
- Week 7 (Semifinals): One Latin dance and one ballroom dance
- Week 8 (Finale): Favorite dance and freestyle

Dancing with the Stars: The Next Pro - Dance chart
Contestant	Week										
Contestant	1	2	3		4	5	6	7		8	
Adele	Samba	Rumba	Team; Paso doble	Team; Tango	Rumba	Contemp.	Tango	Samba	Foxtrot	Samba	Freestyle
AJ	Jive	Jive	Team; Paso doble	Team; Tango	Rumba	Contemp.	Viennese waltz	Cha-cha-cha	Foxtrot	Viennese waltz	Freestyle
Selena	Samba	Jive	Team; Paso doble	Team; Paso doble	Argentine tango	Contemp.	Quickstep	Salsa	Quickstep	Jive	Freestyle
Allen	Jive	Rumba	Team; Paso doble	Team; Tango	Argentine tango	Contemp.	Waltz	Jive	Quickstep		
Nina	Samba	Rumba	Team; Paso doble	Team; Tango	Argentine tango	Contemp.	Foxtrot				
Erik	Jive	Viennese waltz	Team; Paso doble	Team; Paso doble	Argentine tango	Contemp.					
Stephani	Samba	Rumba	Team; Paso doble	Team; Paso doble	Rumba						
Tristen	Jive	Rumba	Team; Paso doble	Team; Paso doble	Rumba						
Natalie	Samba	Viennese waltz									
Benji	Jive	Rumba									
Briar	Samba										
Jake	Jive										

== Reception ==
Josef Adalian of Vulture described The Next Pro as a "win-win-win situation for Disney. Not only does ABC get new programming for its reality-centric summer schedule, but the spinoff itself will serve as months-long promo for the fall season of Dancing with the Stars while also extending the footprint of one of the network's most popular programs beyond the fall."

The series premiere of The Next Pro marked ABC's strongest summer debut across all genres since July 2020, receiving a total of 5.33 million viewers across ABC, Disney+, and Hulu platforms three days after its debut. At the time, it stood as the best alternative series premiere of the 2025–2026 television season across broadcast and cable, excluding lead-ins from the National Football League.
