= Jackson Olson =

American baseball player and social media personality (born 1997)

- Olson in 2025

Savannah Bananas – No. 8
- Infielder
- Born: October 6, 1997 (age 29); New Milford, Connecticut, U.S.
- Bats: Left Throws: Right

Banana Ball (BBCL) debut
- 2022, for the Savannah Bananas
- Stats at Baseball Reference

Jackson Daniel Olson (born October 6, 1997) is an American baseball player, entertainer, and social media personality. He is best known as a second baseman for the Savannah Bananas, a BBCL baseball team.

== Early life and education ==
Olson was born and raised in New Milford, Connecticut, where he attended New Milford High School. He was a three-sport athlete, participating in baseball, football, and basketball. As a senior, he batted .464 with 23 RBIs and 14 extra-base hits, leading his team to the 2016 conference championship game and the Class LL state semifinals. He earned First Team Class LL All-State honors and was named to the Connecticut Hearst Media Super 15 All-Star team.

Olson began his collegiate baseball career at the University of Hartford, where he played for four seasons. During his tenure, he appeared in 161 games, posting a .288 career batting average. He was a key contributor to the 2018 team that captured the America East Championship for the first time in program history. Academically, Olson was a three-time America East All-Academic Team member. He was included among America East Commissioner's Honor Roll accolades, and won the America East Baseball Scholar-Athlete of the Year in 2020. He graduated the University of Hartford, with a Bachelor of Science in Business Administration (BSBA) in 2020.

After completing his undergraduate studies, Olson pursued a Master of Business Administration at Stetson University, where he also played for the Hatters baseball team during the 2021 season.

== Career ==
=== Savannah Bananas ===
In 2022, Olson joined the Savannah Bananas. Olson has been featured in various media outlets highlighting "Banana Ball", which combines traditional baseball with entertainment elements like choreographed dances and fan interaction.

=== Dancing with the Stars ===
On May 12, 2026, Olson was announced to be joining the Dancing with the Stars cast for season thirty-five. He was eliminated during Week 7: Horror Movie Night on October 27th, 2026.

== Personal life ==
Olson resides in Savannah, Georgia. In April 2026, he announced on his Instagram account that he was dating Maggie Sajak.

== Filmography ==
=== Television ===
As himself
Year	Title	Notes	Ref.
2026	Dancing with the Stars	Season 35; Contestant	
