= Brandon Armstrong (dancer) =

American professional dancer (born 1994)

- Born: Brandon Kelly Armstrong; June 5, 1994 (age 32); Martinez, California, U.S.
- Occupations: Dancer; choreographer
- Years active: 2006–present
- Television: Dancing with the Stars
- Spouse: Brylee Ivers (m. 2022)

Brandon Kelly Armstrong (born June 5, 1994) is an American professional Latin and ballroom dancer best known for his appearances on the reality competition series Dancing with the Stars.

== Early life ==
Brandon Kelly Armstrong was born on June 5, 1994, in Martinez, California. He identifies as mixed race; he is half African American and half Polynesian. Armstrong was adopted at birth by a white military family and was raised Mormon in Napa, California. He moved to Lehi, Utah and began dancing when he was twelve years old; he trained with Corky Ballas, Shirley Ballas, and Mark Ballas. After graduating from high school, Armstrong served a two-year mission for the Church of Jesus Christ of Latter-day Saints in Little Rock, Arkansas and Memphis, Tennessee.

== Dancing with the Stars ==
Armstrong started working on the reality competition series Dancing with the Stars as a troupe member on season 24, and remained in that role until season 26. He was promoted to pro in season 27 and was partnered with singer-songwriter Tinashe. Despite consistently receiving high scores and praise from the judges, they were eliminated during the fourth week of competition on October 15, 2018, finishing in tenth place.

In season 28, Armstrong was partnered with Mary Wilson of the girl group the Supremes. They were the first couple to be eliminated from the season, finishing in twelfth place; Armstrong's lowest placement to date. In season 29, Armstrong was partnered with television host Jeannie Mai. They withdrew from the competition on November 2, 2020, after Mai was hospitalized for epiglottitis. In season 30, Armstrong was partnered with actress Kenya Moore. They were eliminated during the sixth week of competition on October 25, 2021, finishing in tenth place.

In season 31, Armstrong was partnered with singer-songwriter and actress Jordin Sparks. They were eliminated during the seventh week of competition on October 31, 2022, finishing in ninth place. For season 32, Armstrong was partnered with social media personality and singer Lele Pons. They were eliminated during the seventh week of competition on November 7, 2023, finishing in eighth place.

Armstrong had a breakthrough performance in season 33 with his partner, television actress and singer Chandler Kinney. Despite inconsistent remarks from the judges, especially from Carrie Ann Inaba and Derek Hough, the couple earned both the highest cumulative points and the first perfect score, of the season. Armstrong and Kinney are the first Black couple in Dancing with the Stars history to advance to the finale. Their freestyle routine to "Hellzapoppin'" and "Move On Up" was the show's first performance to feature an ensemble cast of all-Black dancers. Armstrong and Kinney ultimately finished in third place on November 26, 2024; Armstrong's highest placement to date.

For season 34, Armstrong was partnered with Lauren Jauregui of the girl group Fifth Harmony. They were unexpectedly eliminated during the third week of competition on September 30, 2025, finishing in twelfth place. For season 35, Armstrong was partnered with Summer House star Ciara Miller. Despite receiving their highest score, they were unexpectedly eliminated during the fourth week of competition on October 6, 2026, finishing in twelfth place.

=== Performances ===
Season	Partner	Place
27	Tinashe	10th
28	Mary Wilson	12th
29	Jeannie Mai	9th
30	Kenya Moore	10th
31	Jordin Sparks	9th
32	Lele Pons	8th
33	Chandler Kinney	3rd
34	Lauren Jauregui	12th
35	Ciara Miller	12th

Highest and lowest scoring per dance
Dance	Partner	Highest	Partner	Lowest
Argentine tango	Chandler Kinney	30	Kenya Moore	24
Cha-cha-cha	Chandler Kinney	30	Mary Wilson	15
Contemporary	Jordin Sparks	27	Kenya Moore	21
Foxtrot	Chandler Kinney	29	Ciara Miller	15
Freestyle	Chandler Kinney	30		
Jazz	Jordin Sparks	26	Ciara Miller	21
Jive	Chandler Kinney	30	Tinashe	23
Marathon	Lele Pons	4	Jordin Sparks	3
Paso doble	Chandler Kinney	27	Jeannie Mai; Lele Pons	25
Quickstep	Jordin Sparks	21		
Rumba	Tinashe; Kenya Moore	27	Jordin Sparks	21
Salsa	Chandler Kinney	29	Jeannie Mai	18
Samba	Lele Pons	21		
Tango	Jordin Sparks	27	Ciara Miller	18
Viennese waltz	Chandler Kinney	29	Jeannie Mai; Kenya Moore	22

Scores out of 40 are adjusted to a 30-point scale

Season 27 with celebrity partner Tinashe

Week	Dance	Song	Judges' score			Total	Result
Week	Dance	Song	Inaba	Goodman	Tonioli	Total	Result
1	Jive	"I'm a Lady" — Meghan Trainor	8	7	8	23	Safe
2	Argentine tango	"New Dorp. New York." — SBTRKT, feat. Ezra Koenig	9	8	9	26	No Elimination
2	Cha-cha-cha	"Circus" — Britney Spears	9	8	9	26	Safe
3	Rumba	"2 On" — Tinashe, feat. Schoolboy Q	9	9	9	27	Safe
4	Tango	"Hit Me with Your Best Shot" — Pat Benatar	9	8	9	26	Eliminated

Season 28 with celebrity partner Mary Wilson

Week	Dance	Song	Judges' score			Total	Result
Week	Dance	Song	Inaba	Goodman	Tonioli	Total	Result
1	Foxtrot	"Baby Love" — The Supremes	6	5	6	17	No Elimination
2	Cha-cha-cha	"Think" — Aretha Franklin	5	5	5	15	Eliminated

Season 29 with celebrity partner Jeannie Mai

Week	Dance	Song	Judges' score			Total	Result
Week	Dance	Song	Inaba	Hough	Tonioli	Total	Result
1	Salsa	"Tell It to My Heart" — Taylor Dayne	6	6	6	18	No Elimination
2	Cha-cha-cha	"Roses" — Saint Jhn	6	6	6	18	Safe
3	Viennese waltz	"Married Life" — Michael Giacchino	7	7	8	22	Safe
4	Tango	"Seven Nation Army" — The White Stripes	7	7	7	21	Safe
5	Jazz	"Like a Virgin" — Madonna	8	8	8	24	Safe
6	Rumba	"You Gotta Be" — Des'ree	8	8	9	25	Safe
7	Paso doble	"Maneater" — Nelly Furtado	8	9	8	25	Bottom Two (Note: Despite originally being saved by the judges, Jeannie and Brandon withdrew before week 8 due to her being hospitalized for epiglottitis.)

Notes

Season 30 with celebrity partner Kenya Moore

Week	Dance	Dance / Song	Judges' score				Total	Result
Week	Dance	Dance / Song	Inaba	Goodman	Hough	Tonioli	Total	Result
1	Foxtrot	"Kiss Me More" — Doja Cat, feat. SZA	7	6	6	7	26	No Elimination
2	Cha-cha-cha	"Hot Stuff" — Donna Summer	6	6	6	6	24	Safe
3	Tango	"Womanizer" — Britney Spears	7	7	—N/a	7	21 (Note: Due to Derek Hough's absence, scores were given on a 30 point scale.)	Bottom Two
4	Contemporary	"How Far I'll Go" — Auliʻi Cravalho	7	7	8	7	29	No Elimination
4	Viennese waltz	"Dangerous Woman" — Ariana Grande	7	7	8	8	30	Bottom Three
5	Rumba	"There Are Worse Things I Could Do" — Stockard Channing	9	9	9	9	36	Safe
6	Argentine tango	"Take My Breath" — The Weeknd	8	8	8	8	32	Eliminated

Notes

Season 31 with celebrity partner Jordin Sparks

Week	Dance	Song	Judges' score				Total	Result
Week	Dance	Song	Inaba	Goodman	Hough	Tonioli	Total	Result
1	Cha-cha-cha	"I Wanna Dance with Somebody (Who Loves Me)" — Whitney Houston	7	6	6	7	26	Safe
2	Quickstep	"Hound Dog" — Elvis Presley	7	6	7	7	27	Safe
3	Rumba	"Licence to Kill" — Gladys Knight	7	7	7	8	29	Safe
4	Jazz	"Remember Me" — Benjamin Bratt	9	8	8	9	34	Safe
5	Salsa	"Let's Get Married (ReMarquable Remix)" — Jagged Edge, feat. RUN	8	8	8	9	33	Safe
5	Contemporary	"No Air" — Jordin Sparks & Chris Brown	9	8	9	9	35	Safe
5	Hustle & Lindy Hop Marathon	"Hot Stuff" — Donna Summer "Jump, Jive an' Wail" — The Brian Setzer Orchestra	—N/a	—N/a	—N/a	—N/a	3 (Note: Jordin and Brandon received 3 bonus points from the dance marathon.)	Safe
6	Foxtrot	"You Make Me Feel So Young" — Michael Bublé	9	8	8	9	43 (Note: Jordin and Brandon also received a score of 9 from guest judge Michael Bublé.)	Safe
7	Tango	"Oogie Boogie's Song" — Ed Ivory & Ken Page	9	9	9	9	36	Eliminated
7	Team Freestyle	"The Witches Are Back" — Bette Midler, Sarah Jessica Parker & Kathy Najimy	8	8	9	8	33	Eliminated

Notes

Season 32 with celebrity partner Lele Pons

Week	Dance	Song	Judges' score			Total	Result
Week	Dance	Song	Inaba	Hough	Tonioli	Total	Result
1	Tango	"El Tango de Roxanne" — from Moulin Rouge!	6	7	6	19	Safe
2	Samba	"Gasolina" — Daddy Yankee	7	7	7	21	Safe
3	Cha-cha-cha	"Super Freak" — Rick James	7	6	7	27 (Note: Lele and Brandon also received a score of 7 from guest judge Michael Strahan.)	Safe
4	Rumba	"Can You Feel the Love Tonight" — Elton John	7	7	8	22	Safe
5	Contemporary	"I'll Stand by You" — The Pretenders	8	8	8	24	Safe
6	Paso doble	"Bloody Mary" (TikTok Remix) — Lady Gaga	8	8	9	33 (Note: Lele and Brandon also received a score of 8 from guest judge Niecy Nash-Betts.)	Safe
6	Hustle & Charleston Marathon	"Stayin' Alive" — Bee Gees "Grim Grinning Ghosts" — Kris Bowers	—N/a	—N/a	—N/a	4 (Note: Lele and Brandon received 4 bonus points from the dance marathon.)	Safe
7	Salsa	"Whenever, Wherever" — Shakira	9	8	8	33 (Note: Lele and Brandon also received a score of 8 from guest judge Paula Abdul.)	Eliminated
7	Team Freestyle	"Gangnam Style" — Psy	10	10	10	40 (Note: The team dance also received a score of 10 from guest judge Paula Abdul.)	Eliminated

Notes

Season 33 with celebrity partner Chandler Kinney

Week	Dance	Song	Judges' score			Total	Result
Week	Dance	Song	Inaba	Hough	Tonioli	Total	Result
1	Tango	"Hot to Go!" — Chappell Roan	8	7	8	23	No Elimination
2	Rumba	"What Was I Made For?" — Billie Eilish	8	8	8	24	Safe
3	Cha-cha-cha	"It's Tricky" — Run-DMC	9	9	9	36 (Note: Chandler and Brandon also received a score of 9 from guest judge Rosie Perez.)	No Elimination
3	Jive	"We're Not Gonna Take It" — Twisted Sister	8	8	8	33 (Note: Chandler and Brandon also received a score of 9 from guest judge Gene Simmons.)	Safe
4	Contemporary	"I Hope You Dance" — Lee Ann Womack	8	8	8	32 (Note: Chandler and Brandon also received a score of 8 from guest judge Mark Ballas.)	Safe
5	Paso doble	"We Own the Night" — Cast of Zombies	9	9	9	27	Safe
5	Team Freestyle	"I 2 I" — Tevin Campbell & Rosie Gaines	9	9	9	27	Safe
6	Viennese waltz	"Secret" — Denmark + Winter	9	10	10	29	Safe
7	Argentine tango	"Para Te" — Appart	10	10	10	30	Safe
7	Instant Cha-cha-cha	"Apple" — Charli XCX	10	10	10	30	Safe
8	Salsa	"Spicy Margarita" — Jason Derulo & Michael Bublé	10	9	10	29	No Elimination
8	Foxtrot	"Too Sweet" — Hozier	9	10	10	29	No Elimination
9	Jive	"Apt." — Rosé & Bruno Mars	10	10	10	30	Third Place
9	Freestyle	"Hellzapoppin’" — Eyal Vilner Big Band "Move On Up" — Curtis Mayfield	10	10	10	30	Third Place

Notes

Season 34 with celebrity partner Lauren Jauregui

Week	Dance	Song	Judges' score			Total	Result
Week	Dance	Song	Inaba	Hough	Tonioli	Total	Result
1	Tango	"Yes, And?" — Ariana Grande	—N/a	7	6	13 (Note: Due to Carrie Ann Inaba's absence, scores were given on a 20 point scale.)	No Elimination
2	Foxtrot	"Lovefool" — The Cardigans	7	7	7	21	Safe
3	Cha-cha-cha	"Work from Home" — Fifth Harmony, feat. Ty Dolla Sign	6	6	6	18	Eliminated

Notes

Season 35 with celebrity partner Ciara Miller

Week	Dance	Song	Judges' score			Total	Result
Week	Dance	Song	Inaba	Hough	Tonioli	Total	Result
1	Foxtrot	"Exhale (Shoop Shoop)" — Whitney Houston	5	5	5	15	Safe
2	Tango	"No Broke Boys" — Disco Lines & Tinashe	6	6	6	18	Safe
3	Cha-cha-cha	"Never Too Much" — Luther Vandross	6	6	6	18	Safe
4	Jazz	"Emotions" — Mariah Carey	7	7	7	21	Eliminated

== Personal life ==
Armstrong began dating social media manager Brylee Ivers in 2021 after meeting through Instagram. They got engaged on March 7, 2022, and were married on July 30, 2022, in the mountains of Draper, Utah.

Awards and achievements}
Preceded by Ariana Madix & Pasha Pashkov	Dancing with the Stars (US) third place contestant Season 33 (Fall 2024 with Chandler Kinney)	Succeeded by Jordan Chiles & Ezra Sosa
