= Ashly DelGrosso =

American dancer

Ashly Costa
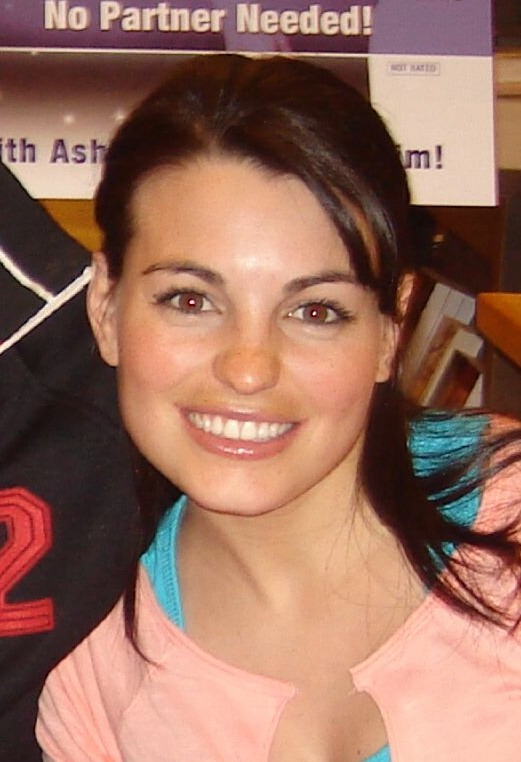
- Born: Ashly DelGrosso; July 9, 1982 (age 44); Denver, Colorado
- Occupation: Professional dancer
- Children: 5

Ashly DelGrosso-Costa (born July 9, 1982), known professionally as Ashly Costa, is an American professional dancer from Highland, Utah who starred on the ABC television series Dancing with the Stars for the first three seasons and returned March 22, 2010 for season 10.

== Early life ==
DelGrosso was born in Denver, Colorado. A self-described "Utah County Mormon", she was introduced to dance by her mother, Kim, who co-owns a dance studio with Alex and Robin Murillo 'Center Stage Performing Arts Studio" in Orem, Utah where DelGrosso has worked as an instructor for six years.

DelGrosso is the fourth of eight children. She has two older brothers, one older sister, and four younger sisters. Her five sisters are also dancers. She performed with her sisters, Averie Michelle, Afton Skye, Autumn, Amber and Abrea Danielle, as a troupe in a third season results show the week after DelGrosso and partner Harry Hamlin were eliminated. Afton competed on the eighth season of Dancing with the Stars in a pro dancer competition to win a spot as a professional in the show's ninth season but did not make past the third week of competition (four weeks in total).

== Career ==
With Jonathan Gulledge, amateur dance partner, DelGrosso has won several Amateur Ten Dance titles.

She partnered professionally with Rick Robinson- her coach from the age of eleven, on the professional Latin circuit before retiring shortly before Dancing with the Stars.

In 2006, DelGrosso guest starred on The Suite Life of Zack & Cody as Lori, one of the character's dance partners. She is part of a DVD titled Dancing with the Stars: Cardio Dance along with Kym Johnson and Maksim Chmerkovskiy.

== Personal life ==
A bio on ABC's website during Season 1 of Dancing with the Stars stated that DelGrosso's height is 5'3".

On October 21, 2006, DelGrosso married Mike Costa, a field producer for Dancing with the Stars.

On February 20, 2007, DelGrosso announced that she and her husband were expecting their first child. As a result, she would not be able to perform on the fourth season of Dancing with the Stars. On July 27, 2007, DelGrosso gave birth to a son. On July 24, 2009, DelGrosso gave birth to son Enoch Daniel at 6:11 pm. In November 2011, DelGrosso gave birth to a daughter. On December 20, 2014, DelGrosso gave birth to son Samuel. On June 22, 2023, DelGrosso gave birth to daughter Emma.

Ashly comes from the same dance studio as Jaymz Tuaileva, Julianne Hough, Derek Hough, Chelsie Hightower, and Jared Murillo.

== Dancing accolades ==
- Champion, Professional Rising Star Latin - Holiday Dance Classic, Las Vegas, Nevada
- Semi-Finalist, World Professional Rising Star Latin Championships
- Finalist, Professional Rising Star Latin - U.S. DanceSport Championships
- Two-Time Champion, U.S. Youth International Ten Dance
- Amateur Ten Dance Champion
- U.S. Youth Standard Champion

== Track record on Dancing with the Stars ==
- In Season 1, DelGrosso partnered with musician and New Kids on the Block singer Joey McIntyre, coming in third place.
- In Season 2, she and rap star Master P came in seventh. The pair received the lowest scores ever given on the show and were at the bottom of the leader board every week of competition.
- Also on Season 2, she and host Tom Bergeron danced a Quickstep, though it was not for scores or votes. Len Goodman said part of the dance could have been on America's Funniest Home Videos.
- DelGrosso and celebrity partner Harry Hamlin were eliminated on third week of Season 3 of Dancing with the Stars, coming in ninth.
- She was on the 100th episode of Dancing with the Stars.
- Her sister Afton participated in a competition held during Season 8 to be a professional on the following season.
- In Season 10, DelGrosso appeared with astronaut Buzz Aldrin. She returned for her fourth season after being absent for the previous six seasons. She and Aldrin were eliminated on April 6, 2010, coming in tenth.

=== Celebrity partners ===
Season	Partner	Place	Average Score
1	Joey McIntyre	3rd	21.33
2	Master P	7th	12.50
3	Harry Hamlin	9th	20.00
10	Buzz Aldrin	10th	13.00

=== Performances ===
==== Season 1 ====
With celebrity partner Joey McIntyre

Week #	Dance/Song	Judges' score			Total	Result
Week #	Dance/Song	Inaba	Goodman	Tonioli	Total	Result
1	Cha-cha-cha/"Crazy in Love"	7	7	6	20	No Eliminations
2	Quickstep/"You're the One That I Want"	8	7	6	21	Safe
3	Jive/"I'm Still Standing"	7	7	8	22	Bottom 2
4	Samba/"Tequila"; Group Viennese Waltz/ "I Got You Babe"	7 No	6 Scores	7 Given	20	Safe
5	Foxtrot/"Big Spender"; Paso Doble/"Eye of the Tiger"	8; 9	6; 8	6; 8	45 (20 + 25)	Third Place

==== Season 2 ====
With celebrity partner Master P

Week #	Dance/Song	Judges' score			Total	Result
Week #	Dance/Song	Inaba	Goodman	Tonioli	Total	Result
1	Cha-cha-cha/"I Want You Back"	4	4	4	12	Safe
2	Quickstep/"Zoot Suit Riot"	6	5	5	16	Bottom 2
3	Jive/"Saturday Night's Alright for Fighting"	6	4	4	14	Safe
4	Paso Doble/"Don't Let Me Be Misunderstood"	4	2	2	8	Eliminated

==== Season 3 ====
With celebrity partner Harry Hamlin

Week #	Dance/Song	Judges' score			Total	Result
Week #	Dance/Song	Inaba	Goodman	Tonioli	Total	Result
1	Cha-cha-cha/"Disco Inferno"	5	6	6	17	Safe
2	Quickstep/"Lust for Life"	7	7	7	21	Safe
3	Tango/"Santa Maria"	7	8	7	22	Eliminated

==== Season 10 ====
With celebrity partner Buzz Aldrin

Week #	Dance/Song	Judges' score			Total	Result
Week #	Dance/Song	Inaba	Goodman	Tonioli	Total	Result
1	Cha-cha-cha/"Cupid"	5	4	5	14	No Eliminations
2	Foxtrot/"Fly Me to the Moon"	4	4	4	12	Safe
3	Waltz/"What a Wonderful World"	5	4	4	13	Eliminated
