= Dancing with the Stars (American TV series) =

American reality dance competition television series

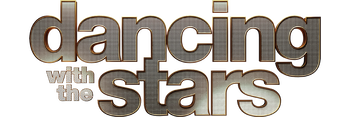
- Genre: Reality competition
- Based on: Strictly Come Dancing by: Fenia Vardanis; Richard Hopkins; Karen Smith
- Directed by: Alex Rudzinski (2005–2016); Phil Heyes (2016–present)
- Presented by: Tom Bergeron; Lisa Canning; Samantha Harris; Brooke Burke-Charvet; Erin Andrews; Tyra Banks; Alfonso Ribeiro; Julianne Hough
- Starring: Dancing with the Stars competitors
- Judges: Len Goodman; Carrie Ann Inaba; Bruno Tonioli; Julianne Hough; Derek Hough
- Narrated by: Alan Dedicoat
- Country of origin: United States
- Original language: English
- No. of seasons: 35
- No. of episodes: 525 (list of episodes)

Production
- Executive producers: Ashley Edens-Shaffer; Joe Sungkur; Rob Wade (2014–2017); Andrew Llinares (2018–2021); David Ruskey; Tyra Banks (2020–2022); Conrad Green (2005–2014; 2022–present); Ryan O'Dowd (2024–present)
- Production locations: Television City Studios, Los Angeles, California
- Running time: 40–86 minutes (ABC); 120 minutes (Disney+)
- Production company: BBC Studios Los Angeles

Original release
- Network: ABC
- Release: June 1, 2005 – November 22, 2021
- Release: September 26, 2023 – present
- Network: Disney+
- Release: September 19, 2022 – present

Related
- Dancing with the Stars: Juniors; Dancing with the Stars: The Next Pro

Dancing with the Stars is an American reality dance competition television series that premiered on ABC on June 1, 2005. It is the American version of the British contest program Strictly Come Dancing and is part of the Dancing with the Stars franchise. The series pairs celebrities with professional dancers to perform primarily ballroom and Latin routines. Each couple competes against the others for judges' points and audience votes. The couple receiving the lowest combined total of judges' points and audience votes is usually eliminated each week until only the champion dance pair remains. Since the thirty-second season in 2023, the series has been hosted by Alfonso Ribeiro and Julianne Hough, with Carrie Ann Inaba, Derek Hough, and Bruno Tonioli serving as judges.

In April 2022, it was announced that, beginning with the thirty-first season, Dancing with the Stars would move from ABC to Disney+. However, for season thirty-two, the series returned to ABC while continuing to be streamed simultaneously on Disney+. The thirty-fifth season premiered in September 2026.

== Cast ==
=== Hosts ===
Logo used from 2007 to 2018 which was used in promotional posters. This logo is still being used on international versions.

Tom Bergeron (who was also hosting America's Funniest Home Videos, also on ABC, at the time of the show's premiere) was the host for the show's first 28 seasons, beginning with its premiere in 2005. In season 1, his co-host was Lisa Canning. She was subsequently replaced by Samantha Harris for seasons 2 through 9 (2006–2009), who was then replaced by Brooke Burke-Charvet from seasons 10 through 17 (2010–2013). Erin Andrews served as co-host from season 18 through 28 (2014–2019).

On July 13, 2020, Bergeron announced in a tweet that he had been dismissed from the series. ABC and BBC Studios made an official announcement shortly afterward saying Andrews would also be leaving the program. The following day, model and host Tyra Banks was announced to be joining the show as host in addition to serving as an executive producer for the twenty-ninth season. On July 14, 2022, it was announced that Alfonso Ribeiro would join Banks as co-host for the thirty-first season. On March 17, 2023, it was revealed that Banks would be leaving the show prior to the thirty-second season. Three days later, it was announced that Julianne Hough would be joining as co-host for season 32, while Ribeiro was elevated to main host.

=== Judges ===
The regular judges included Len Goodman, who served as head judge, Carrie Ann Inaba, and Bruno Tonioli. Goodman was absent for much of season 19, the entirety of season 21, much of season 23, and the entirety of season 29. Julianne Hough, who had been a professional dancing partner for seasons 4 through 8, was added as a full-time judge for seasons 19 through 21, after having been a guest judge in the previous two seasons. She did not return for season 22, but she did return as a full-time judge for seasons 23 and 24, but did not return subsequently. Julianne's brother, Derek Hough, replaced Len Goodman for season 29, as Goodman was unable to travel from London to Los Angeles due to COVID-19 travel restrictions, though he was able to "share his ballroom expertise" during the season via pre-taped clips. Goodman announced during the season 31 semifinals that he would be retiring from the show at the end of the season.

Following Goodman's death in April 2023, the Mirrorball Trophy was renamed the Len Goodman Mirrorball Trophy beginning in season 32.

=== Cast timeline ===
Color key

Host
Co-host
Contestant
Professional dancer
Judge
Guest judge

Cast member	Seasons																																		
Cast member	1	2	3	4	5	6	7	8	9	10	11	12	13	14	15	16	17	18	19	20	21	22	23	24	25	26	27	28	29	30	31	32	33	34	35
Tom Bergeron	●	●	●	●	●	●	●	●	●	●	●	●	●	●	●	●	●	●	●	●	●	●	●	●	●	●	●	●						●	
Tyra Banks																													●	●	●				
Alfonso Ribeiro																			●		●										●	●	●	●	●
Lisa Canning	●																																		
Samantha Harris		●	●	●	●	●	●	●	●																										
Brooke Burke							●			●	●	●	●	●	●	●	●																		
Erin Andrews										●								●	●	●	●	●	●	●	●	●	●	●							
Julianne Hough				●	●	●	●	●									●	●	●	●	●		●	●	●					●		●	●	●	●
Len Goodman	●	●	●	●	●	●	●	●	●	●	●	●	●	●	●	●	●	●	●	●		●	●	●	●	●	●	●		●	●				
Carrie Ann Inaba	●	●	●	●	●	●	●	●	●	●	●	●	●	●	●	●	●	●	●	●	●	●	●	●	●	●	●	●	●	●	●	●	●	●	●
Bruno Tonioli	●	●	●	●	●	●	●	●	●	●	●	●	●	●	●	●	●	●	●	●	●	●	●	●	●	●	●	●	●	●	●	●	●	●	●
Derek Hough					●	●	●	●	●	●	●		●	●	●	●	●	●	●	●	●		●						●	●	●	●	●	●	●

=== Gallery ===
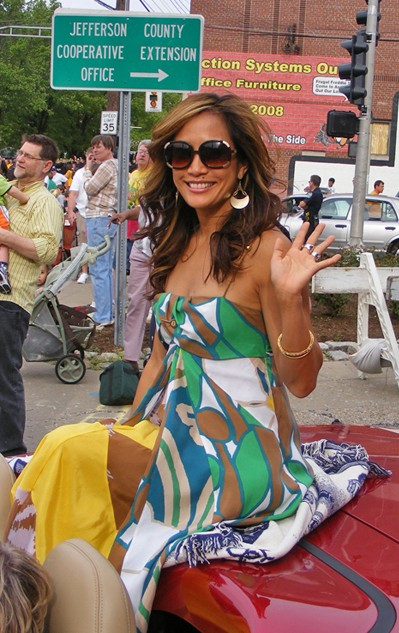
Carrie Ann Inaba (Judge: 1–present)

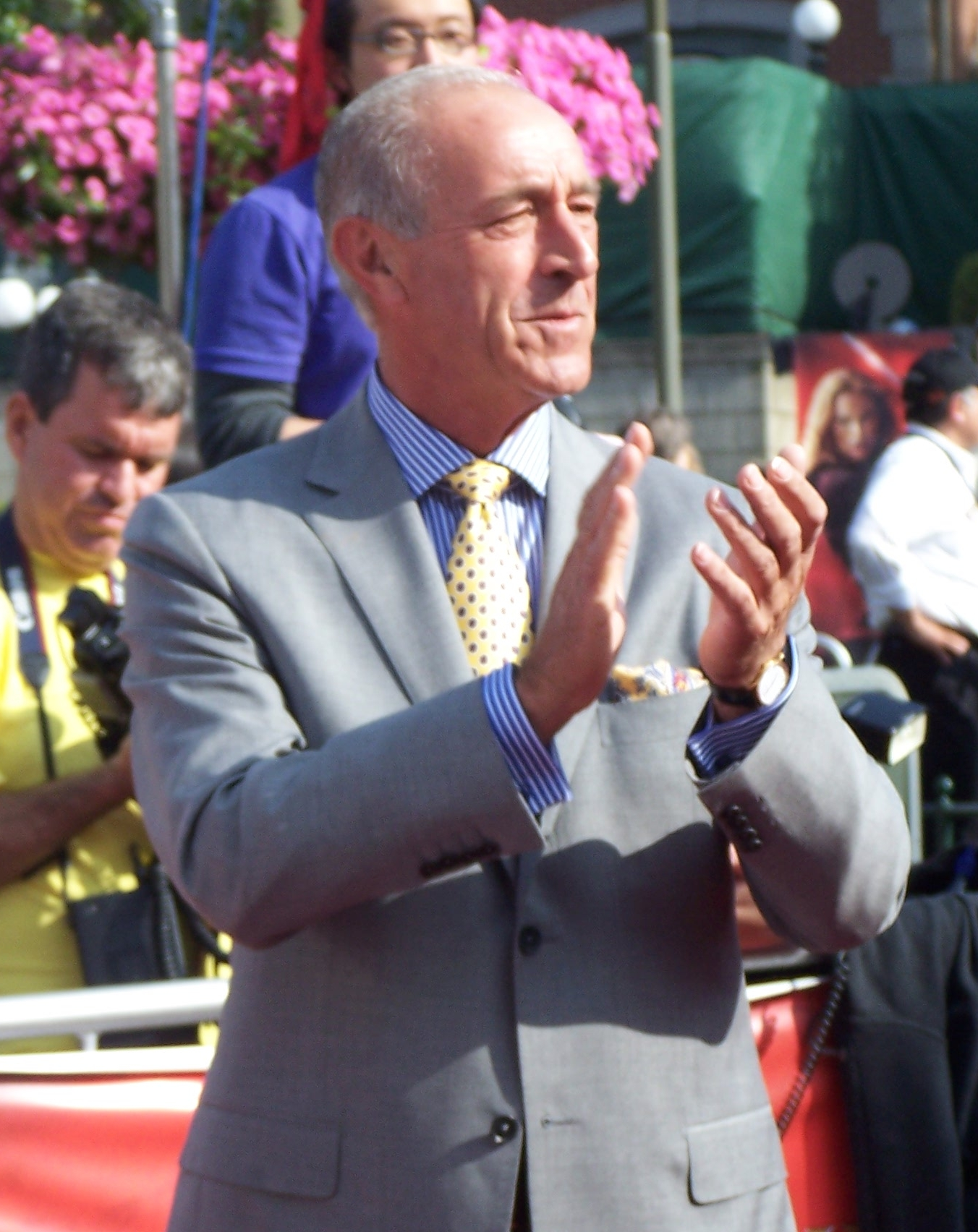
Len Goodman (Judge: 1–20, 22–28, 30–31)

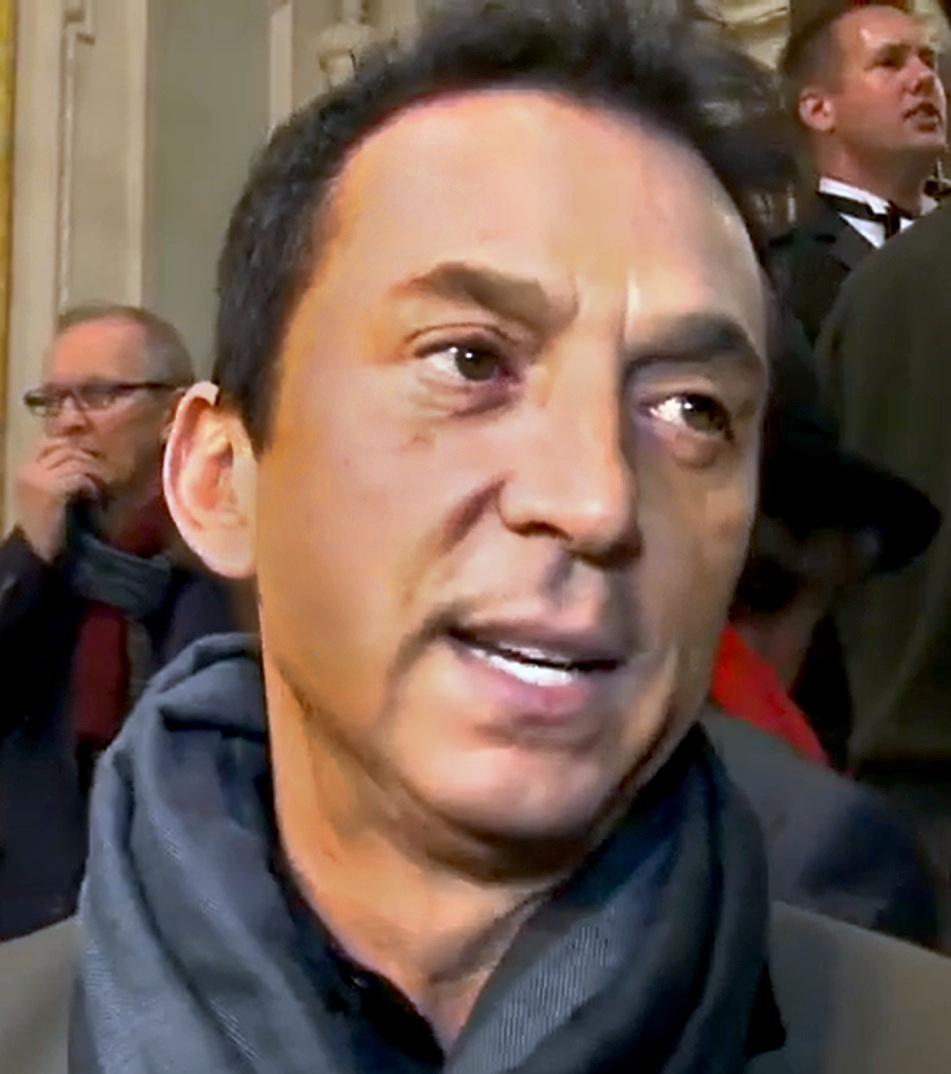
Bruno Tonioli (Judge: 1–present)

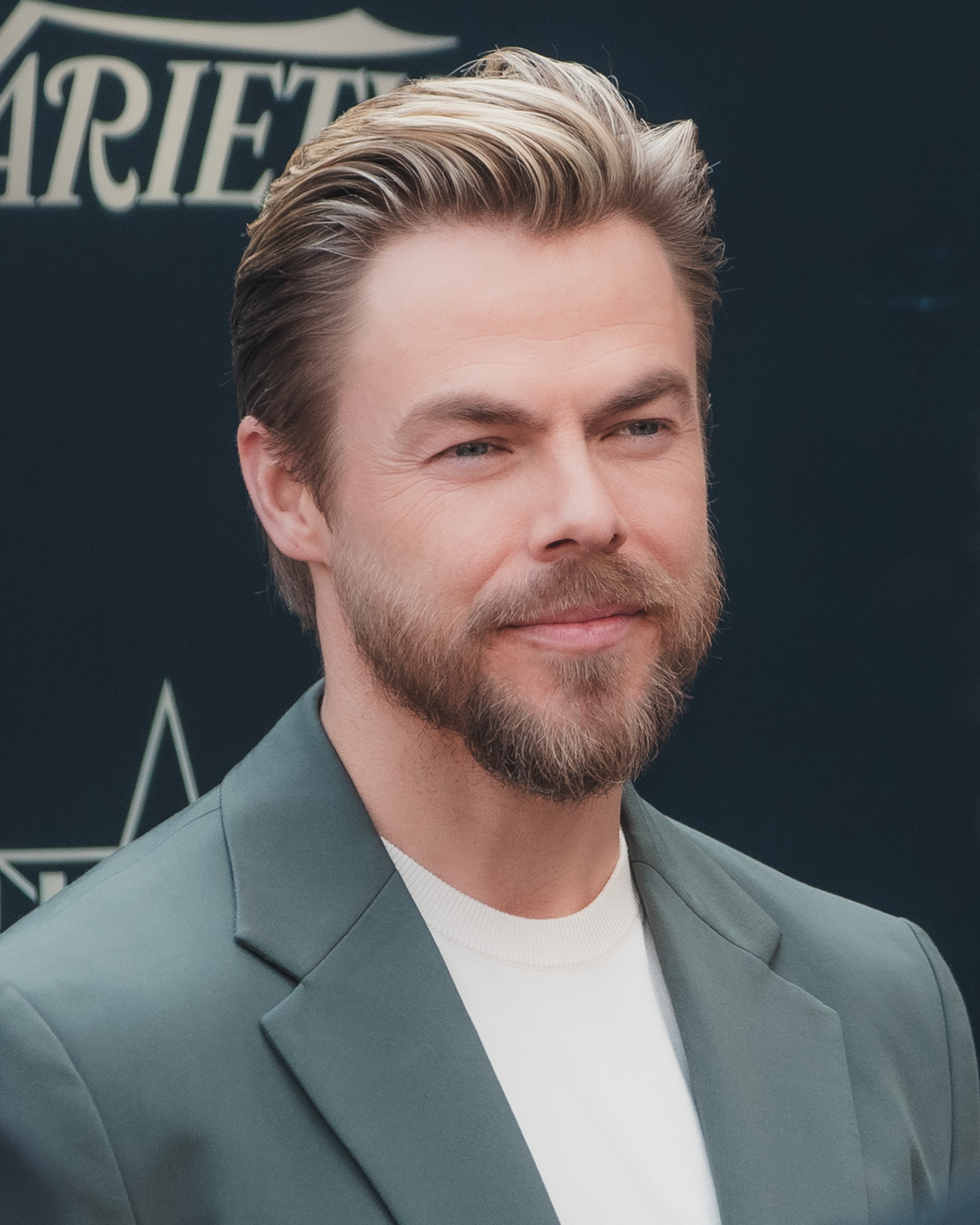
Derek Hough (Judge: 29–present)

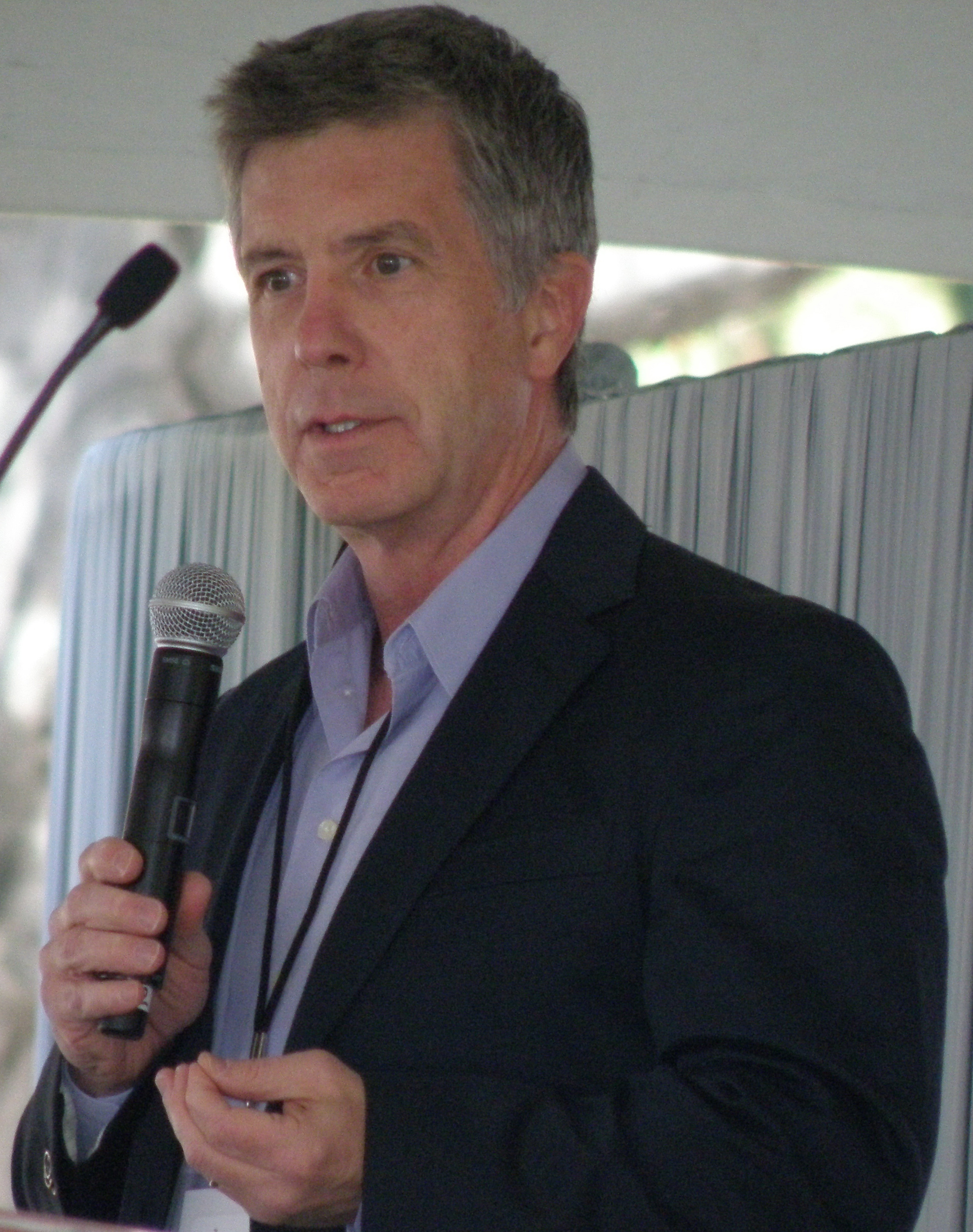
Tom Bergeron Host: (1–28) Guest Judge: (34)

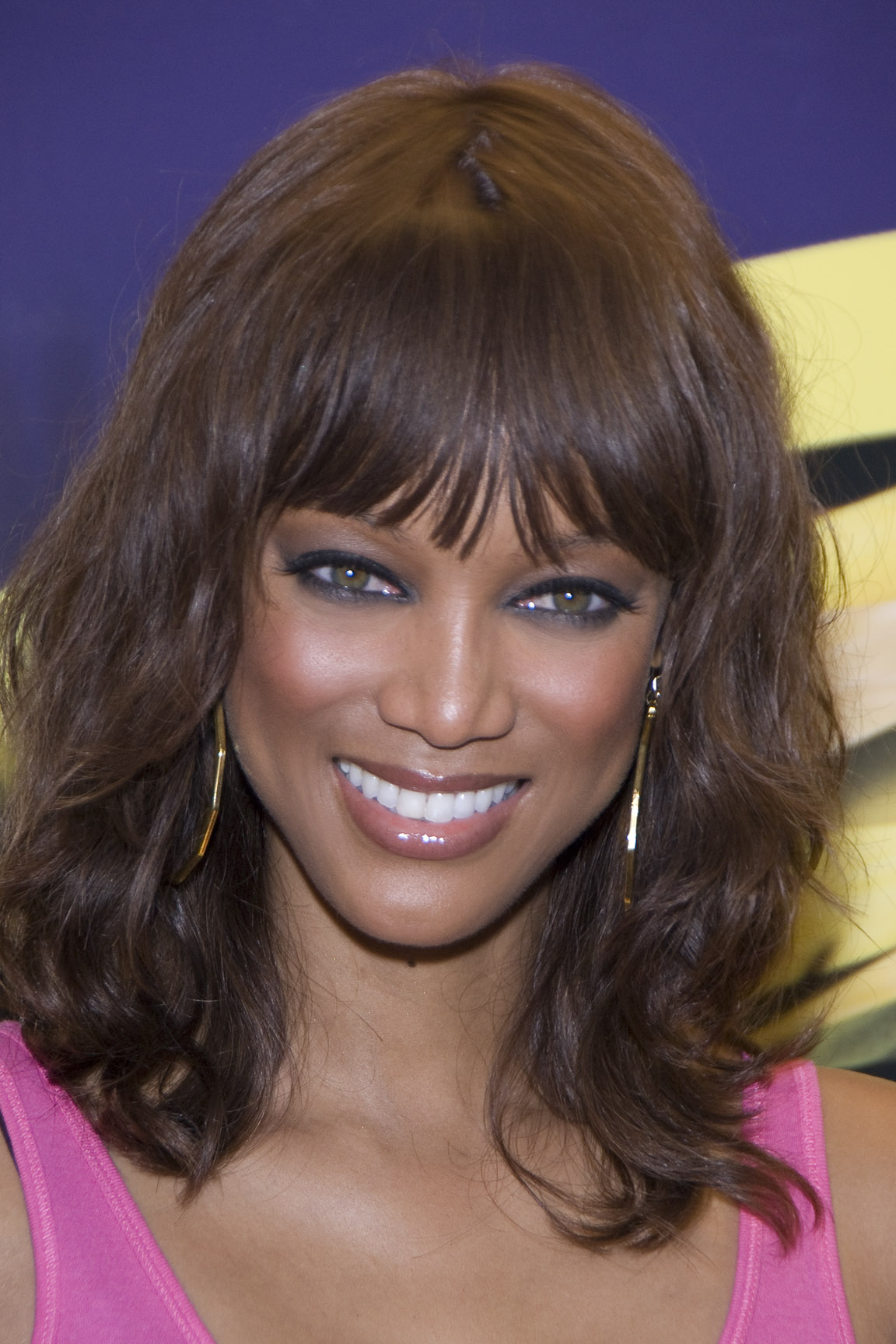
Tyra Banks Host: (29–31)

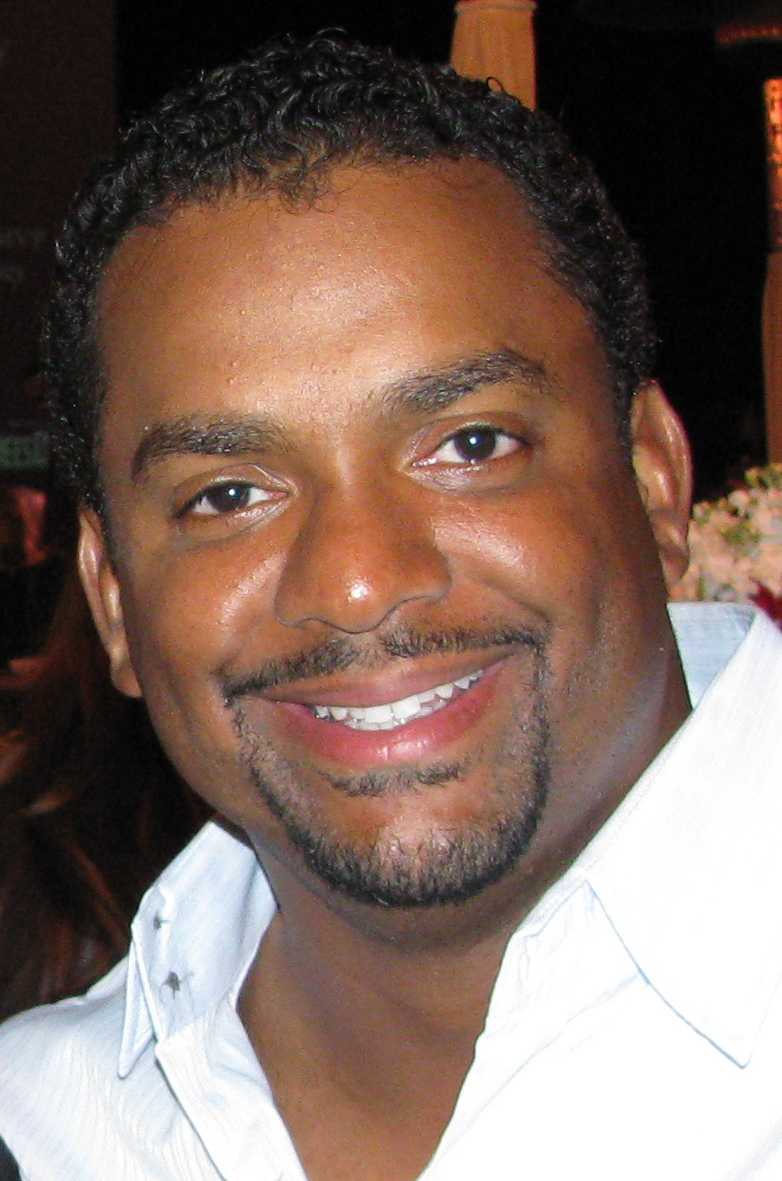
Alfonso Ribeiro Host: (32–present), Co-Host: (31) Guest Judge: (21)

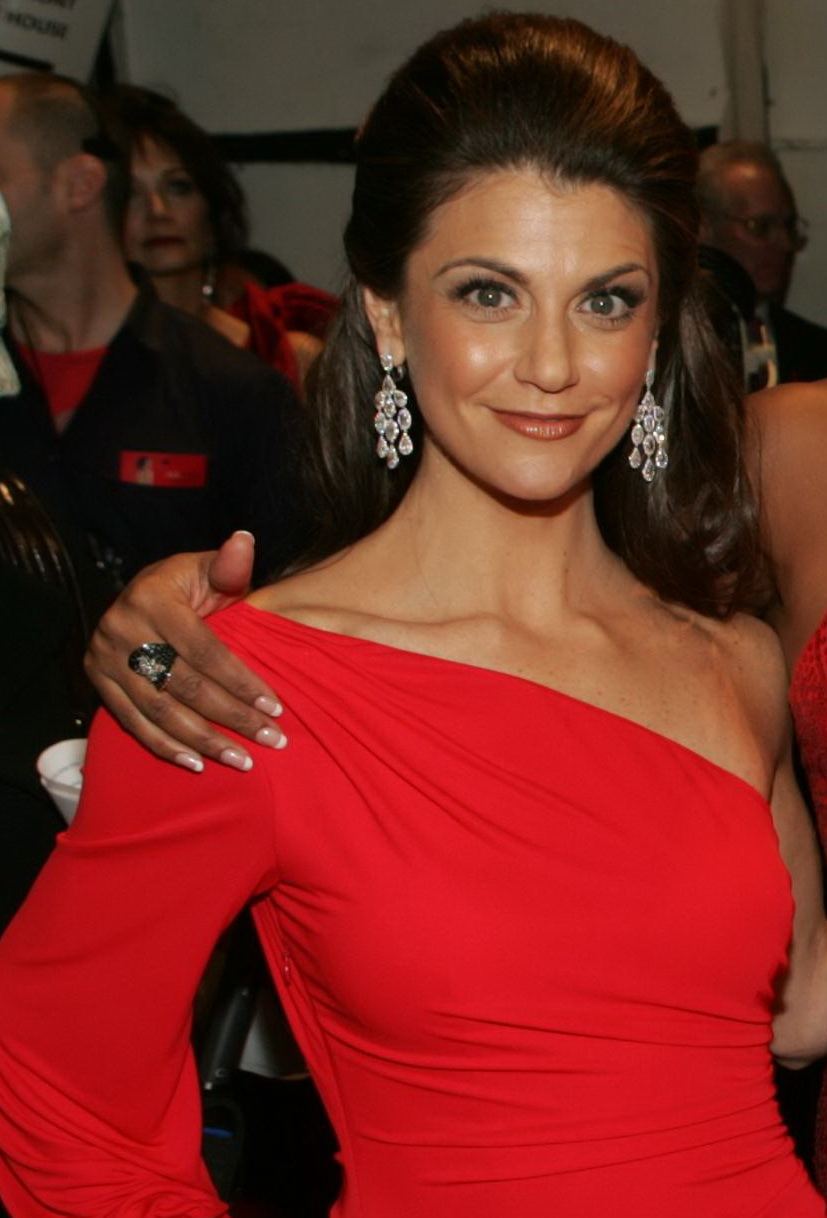
Samantha Harris Co-Host: (2–9)

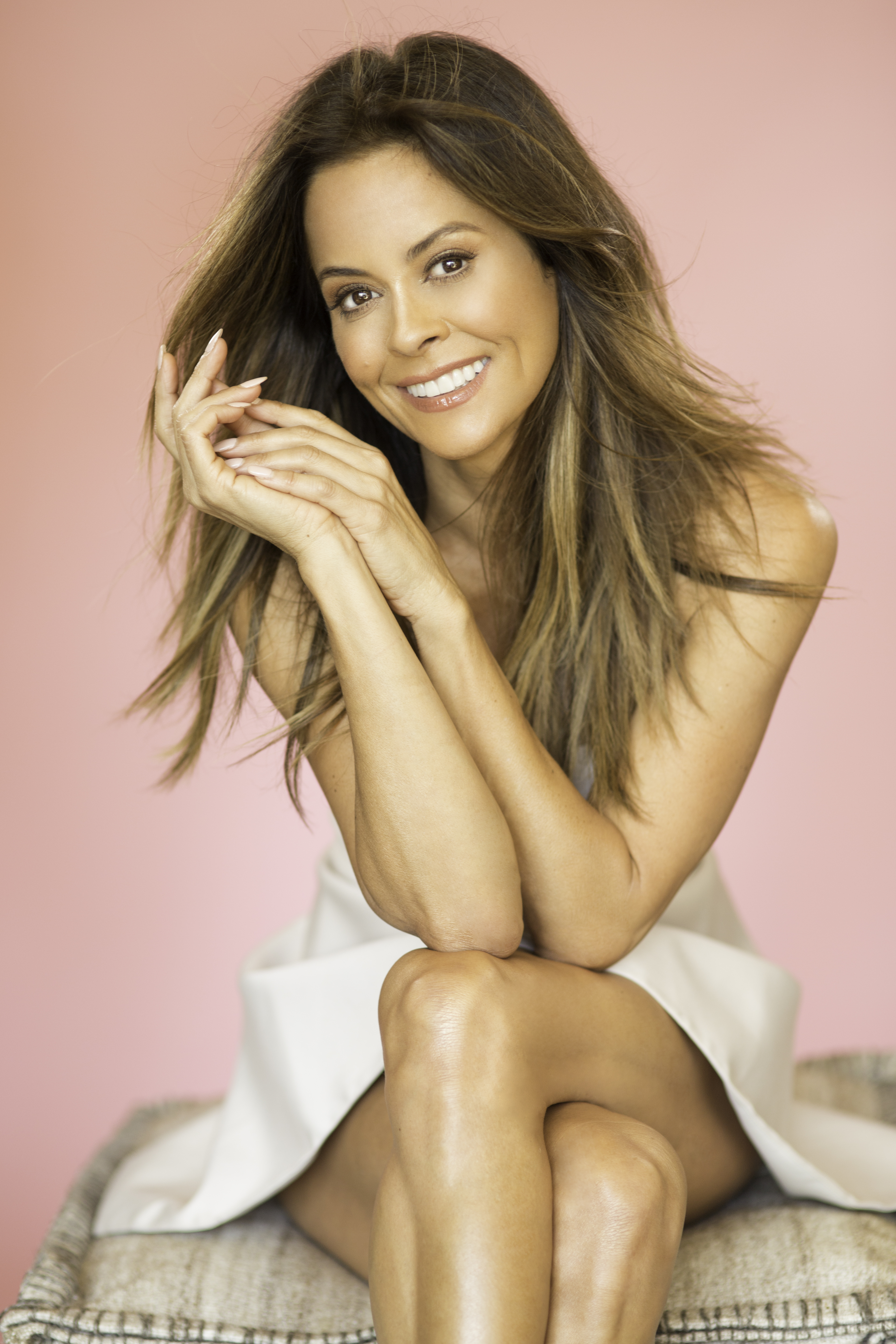
Brooke Burke Co-Host: (10–17)

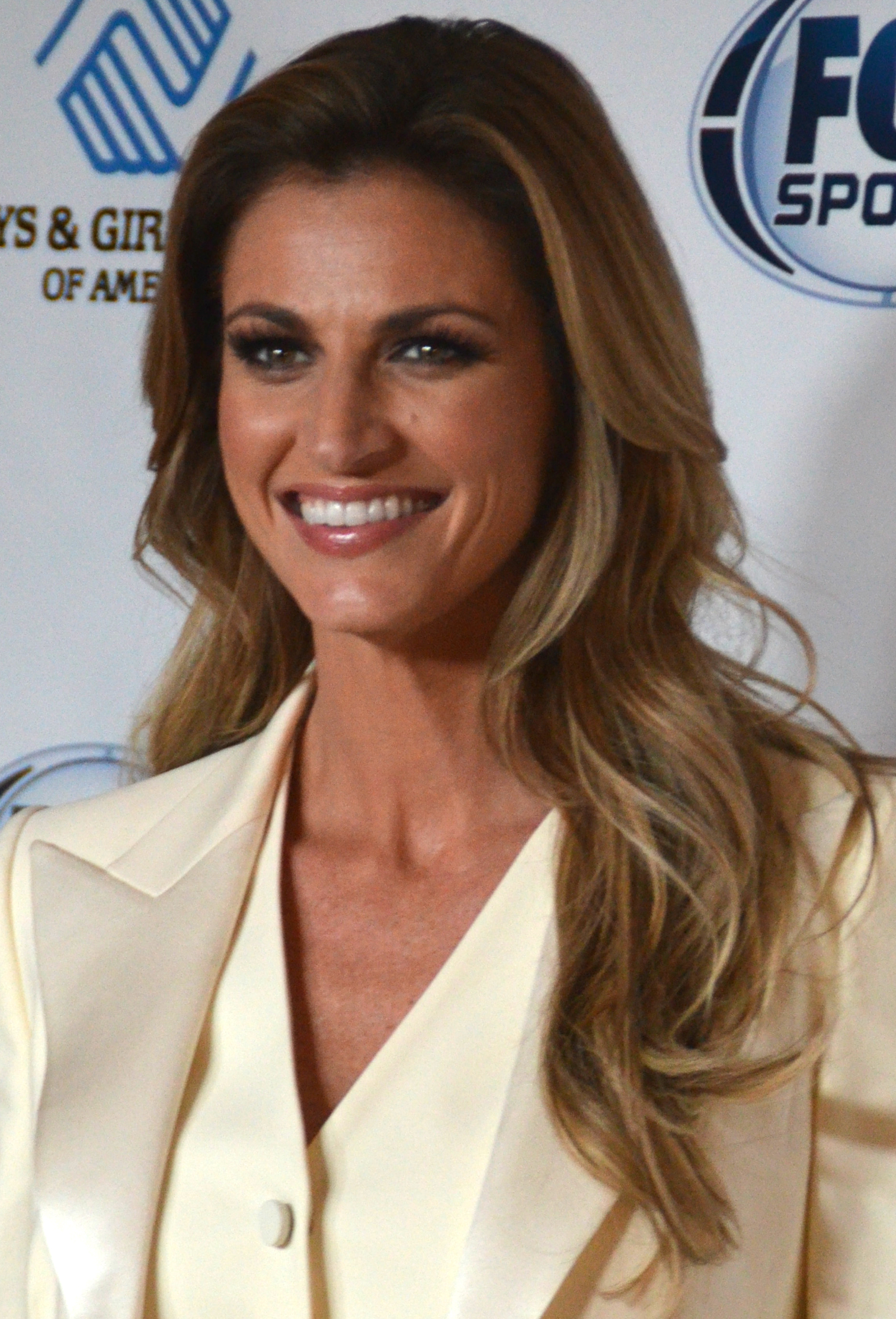
Erin Andrews Co-Host: (18–28)

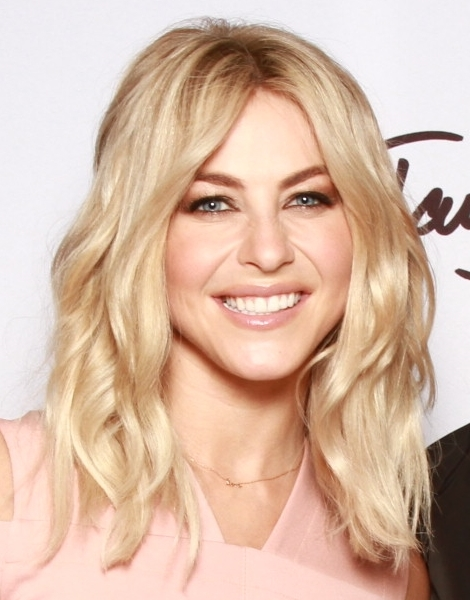
Julianne Hough Co-Host: (32–present), Judge: (19–21, 23–24) Guest Judge: (17–18, 25, 30)

=== Guest judges ===
Guest judges are listed as they appeared during the season.

Dancing with the Stars guest judges
Season	Guest Judge(s)
1	—N/a
2	—N/a
3	—N/a
4	—N/a
5	—N/a
6	—N/a
7	Michael Flatley
8	—N/a
9	Baz Luhrmann
10	—N/a
11	Mel B, Emmitt Smith, Kelly Osbourne, Hélio Castroneves, Gilles Marini and Drew Lachey
12	—N/a
13	—N/a
14	—N/a
15	Paula Abdul
16	—N/a
17	Julianne Hough
18	Robin Roberts, Julianne Hough, Donny Osmond, Redfoo, Ricky Martin, Abby Lee Miller and Kenny Ortega
19	Kevin Hart, Jessie J and Pitbull
20	—N/a
21	Alfonso Ribeiro, Maksim Chmerkovskiy and Olivia Newton-John
22	Zendaya and Maksim Chmerkovskiy
23	Pitbull and Idina Menzel
24	Nick Carter and Mandy Moore
25	Shania Twain and Julianne Hough
26	Rashad Jennings and David Ross
27	—N/a
28	Leah Remini and Joey Fatone
29	—N/a
30	Julianne Hough
31	Michael Bublé
32	Michael Strahan, Billy Porter, Niecy Nash-Betts, Paula Abdul and Mandy Moore
33	Rosie Perez, Gene Simmons and Mark Ballas
34	Kym Johnson, Jon M. Chu, Cheryl Burke, Flavor Flav and Tom Bergeron
35	Joe Buck, Kym Johnson, Shirley Ballas and Cynthia Erivo

=== Musicians ===
For 17 seasons, the Harold Wheeler orchestra and singers provided the live music for the show. Starting in season 18, Ray Chew replaced Wheeler as the new band leader, bringing with him a new group of instrumentalists and singers.

=== Professional dancers ===
Each season, celebrities are paired with professional dance partners who instruct them in the various dance styles, design their choreography, and perform with them each week in the competition.

Color key

Professional
Finalist
Winner

Professional dancer	Season																																		
Professional dancer	1	2	3	4	5	6	7	8	9	10	11	12	13	14	15	16	17	18	19	20	21	22	23	24	25	26	27	28	29	30	31	32	33	34	35
Ashly DelGrosso	●	●	●							●																									
Charlotte Jørgensen	●																																		
Alec Mazo	●			●	●		●		●																										
Jonathan Roberts	●	●		●	●	●		●	●																										
Edyta Śliwińska	●	●	●	●	●	●	●	●	●	●												●													
Louis van Amstel	●	●	●			●			●	●	●	●			●						●										●				
Cheryl Burke		●	●	●	●	●	●	●	●	●	●	●	●	●	●	●	●	●	●				●		●		●	●	●	●	●				
Maksim Chmerkovskiy		●	●	●	●		●	●	●	●	●	●	●	●	●			●					●	●	●										
Tony Dovolani		●	●	●	●	●	●	●	●	●	●	●	●	●	●	●	●	●	●	●	●	●													
Andrea Hale		●																																	
Nick Kosovich		●	●																																
Anna Trebunskaya		●			●	●			●	●	●	●	●	●	●						●														
Jesse DeSoto			●																																
Elena Grinenko			●	●																															
Kym Johnson			●	●	●	●	●	●	●		●	●	●	●	●	●				●				●											
Karina Smirnoff			●	●	●	●	●	●	●		●	●	●	●	●	●	●	●	●		●	●													
Brian Fortuna				●																															
Julianne Hough				●	●	●	●	●																											
Mark Ballas					●	●	●	●	●	●	●	●	●	●	●	●	●	●	●	●	●	●			●						●			●	●
Derek Hough					●	●	●	●	●	●	●		●	●	●	●	●	●	●	●	●		●												
Fabian Sanchez						●																													
Corky Ballas							●				●																								
Inna Brayer							●																												
Lacey Schwimmer							●	●	●		●	●	●																						
Dmitry Chaplin								●	●			●																							
Chelsie Hightower								●	●	●	●	●		●	●																				
Anna Demidova									●																										
Damian Whitewood										●																									
Valentin Chmerkovskiy													●	●	●	●	●	●	●	●	●	●	●	●	●		●	●	●	●	●	●	●	●	●
Tristan MacManus													●	●	●	●	●																		
Peta Murgatroyd													●	●	●	●	●	●	●	●		●		●	●			●	●		●	●			
Lindsay Arnold																●					●	●	●	●	●	●	●	●		●					
Sharna Burgess																●	●	●	●	●	●	●	●	●	●	●	●		●	●					●
Gleb Savchenko																●							●	●	●	●	●	●	●	●	●	●	●	●	
Sasha Farber																	●					●	●	●		●	●	●	●	●	●	●	●		
Emma Slater																	●	●	●	●	●		●	●	●	●	●	●	●	●	●	●	●	●	●
Tyne Stecklein																	●																		
Henry Byalikov																		●																	
Witney Carson																		●	●	●	●	●	●	●	●	●	●	●		●	●		●	●	●
Artem Chigvintsev																			●	●		●	●	●	●	●	●		●	●	●	●			
Allison Holker																			●	●	●		●												
Keo Motsepe																			●	●	●	●		●	●	●	●		●						
Jenna Johnson																							●			●	●	●	●	●		●	●	●	●
Alan Bersten																									●	●	●	●	●	●	●	●	●	●	●
Brandon Armstrong																											●	●	●	●	●	●	●	●	●
Pasha Pashkov																												●	●	●	●	●	●	●	●
Daniella Karagach																													●	●	●	●	●	●	●
Britt Stewart																													●	●	●	●	●	●	●
Koko Iwasaki																															●	●			
Rylee Arnold																																●	●	●	●
Ezra Sosa																																	●	●	●
Jan Ravnik																																		●	●
Hailey Bills																																			●
Adele Zaikman																																			●

=== Dance troupe ===
In season 12, the show introduced the dance troupe, which consisted of professional dancers who performed on the show but were not paired with celebrity partners. The first troupe in season 12 included Oksana Dmytrenko, Tristan MacManus, Peta Murgatroyd, Kiki Nyemchek, Nicole Volynets, and Ted Volynets.

The troupe was eliminated in seasons 28, 29, 30 and 32. For season 33, Marcquet Hill, Roman Nevinchanyi, Kailyn Rogers, and Stephani Sosa joined the show as first time troupe members. For season 34, Hailey Bills, Onye Stevenson, Carter Williams, and Jaxon Willard joined the show as first-time troupe members. For season 35, Kamri Peterson, a former pro on Dancing with the Stars: Juniors, joined the troupe as a first-time member. In addition, Jaxon Willard, Carter Williams, and Onye Stevenson returned as second-year troupe members.

Other former troupe members include Brandon Armstrong, Lindsay Arnold, Alan Bersten, Sharna Burgess, Henry Byalikov, Witney Carson, Brittany Cherry, Daria Chesnokova, Artem Chigvintsev, Sasha Farber, Shannon Holtzapffel, Dennis Jauch, Jenna Johnson, Kiril Kulish, Tristan MacManus, Keo Motsepe, Sonny Fredie-Pedersen, Gleb Savchenko, Emma Slater, Julz Tocker, Artur Adamski, Hayley Erbert, Britt Stewart, Morgan Larson, Vladislav Kvartin, D'Angelo Castro, Kateryna Klishyna, Ezra Sosa, and Alexis Warr.

== Series overview ==
Season	Contestants	Episodes	Originally released		Winners	Runners-up
Season	Contestants	Episodes	First released	Last released	Winners	Runners-up
1	6	8	June 1, 2005	September 22, 2005	Kelly Monaco & Alec Mazo	John O'Hurley & Charlotte Jørgensen
2	10	16	January 5, 2006	February 24, 2006	Drew Lachey & Cheryl Burke	Jerry Rice & Anna Trebunskaya
3	11	20	September 12, 2006	November 15, 2006	Emmitt Smith & Cheryl Burke	Mario Lopez & Karina Smirnoff
4	11	19	March 19, 2007	May 22, 2007	Apolo Anton Ohno & Julianne Hough	Joey Fatone & Kym Johnson
5	12	21	September 24, 2007	November 27, 2007	Hélio Castroneves & Julianne Hough	Mel B & Maksim Chmerkovskiy
6	12	20	March 17, 2008	May 20, 2008	Kristi Yamaguchi & Mark Ballas	Jason Taylor & Edyta Śliwińska
7	13	21	September 22, 2008	November 25, 2008	Brooke Burke & Derek Hough	Warren Sapp & Kym Johnson
8	13	21	March 9, 2009	May 19, 2009	Shawn Johnson & Mark Ballas	Gilles Marini & Cheryl Burke
9	16	21	September 21, 2009	November 24, 2009	Donny Osmond & Kym Johnson	Mýa & Dmitry Chaplin
10	11	19	March 22, 2010	May 25, 2010	Nicole Scherzinger & Derek Hough	Evan Lysacek & Anna Trebunskaya
11	12	20	September 20, 2010	November 23, 2010	Jennifer Grey & Derek Hough	Kyle Massey & Lacey Schwimmer
12	11	19	March 21, 2011	May 24, 2011	Hines Ward & Kym Johnson	Kirstie Alley & Maksim Chmerkovskiy
13	12	20	September 19, 2011	November 22, 2011	J. R. Martinez & Karina Smirnoff	Rob Kardashian & Cheryl Burke
14	12	19	March 19, 2012	May 22, 2012	Donald Driver & Peta Murgatroyd	Katherine Jenkins & Mark Ballas
15	13	19	September 24, 2012	November 27, 2012	Melissa Rycroft & Tony Dovolani	Shawn Johnson & Derek Hough
16	12	20	March 18, 2013	May 21, 2013	Kellie Pickler & Derek Hough	Zendaya & Valentin Chmerkovskiy
17	12	12	September 16, 2013	November 26, 2013	Amber Riley & Derek Hough	Corbin Bleu & Karina Smirnoff
18	12	12	March 17, 2014	May 20, 2014	Meryl Davis & Maksim Chmerkovskiy	Amy Purdy & Derek Hough
19	13	15	September 15, 2014	November 25, 2014	Alfonso Ribeiro & Witney Carson	Sadie Robertson & Mark Ballas
20	12	14	March 16, 2015	May 19, 2015	Rumer Willis & Valentin Chmerkovskiy	Riker Lynch & Allison Holker
21	13	14	September 14, 2015	November 24, 2015	Bindi Irwin & Derek Hough	Nick Carter & Sharna Burgess
22	12	11	March 21, 2016	May 24, 2016	Nyle DiMarco & Peta Murgatroyd	Paige VanZant & Mark Ballas
23	13	15	September 12, 2016	November 22, 2016	Laurie Hernandez & Valentin Chmerkovskiy	James Hinchcliffe & Sharna Burgess
24	12	11	March 20, 2017	May 23, 2017	Rashad Jennings & Emma Slater	David Ross & Lindsay Arnold
25	13	12	September 18, 2017	November 21, 2017	Jordan Fisher & Lindsay Arnold	Lindsey Stirling & Mark Ballas
26	10	4	April 30, 2018	May 21, 2018	Adam Rippon & Jenna Johnson	Josh Norman & Sharna Burgess
27	13	11	September 24, 2018	November 19, 2018	Bobby Bones & Sharna Burgess	Milo Manheim & Witney Carson
28	12	11	September 16, 2019	November 25, 2019	Hannah Brown & Alan Bersten	Kel Mitchell & Witney Carson
29	15	11	September 14, 2020	November 23, 2020	Kaitlyn Bristowe & Artem Chigvintsev	Nev Schulman & Jenna Johnson
30	15	11	September 20, 2021	November 22, 2021	Iman Shumpert & Daniella Karagach	JoJo Siwa & Jenna Johnson
31	16	11	September 19, 2022	November 21, 2022	Charli D'Amelio & Mark Ballas	Gabby Windey & Val Chmerkovskiy
32	14	11	September 26, 2023	December 5, 2023	Xochitl Gomez & Val Chmerkovskiy	Jason Mraz & Daniella Karagach
33	13	10	September 17, 2024	November 26, 2024	Joey Graziadei & Jenna Johnson	Ilona Maher & Alan Bersten
34	14	12	September 16, 2025	December 2, 2025 (Note: A holiday television special aired following the season finale.)	Robert Irwin & Witney Carson	Alix Earle & Val Chmerkovskiy
35	16	13	September 15, 2026	December 1, 2026	TBA	TBA

== Scoring and voting procedure ==
In the first two seasons, only the overall ranking between competitors by the judges and the public was relevant. In the third and subsequent seasons, the scoring system has also made the exact scores relevant.

The scoring begins with the judges' marks. Each judge gives a numeric score from 1 to 10, for a total score of 3 to 30 or 40. The scoring was altered for the "all-star" season 15, during which judges could give scores at 1/2-point intervals from 0.5 to 10, for a total score of 1.5 to 30. When multiple performances are scored, only the cumulative total counts. The contestants' judges' shares are calculated as the percentage of the total number of points awarded to all contestants that evening. (For example, if a team earned 20 points on a night when the judges awarded 200 points, their judges' share would be 20/200 = 10%.) This percentage is then added to the percentage of North American votes received by each contestant. The two couples with the lowest scores are identified at the end of the show, and the couple with the lowest combined total gets eliminated. Season 8 added an occasional "dance-off", in which contestants could re-perform one of their dances, to improve their judges' score. This was later discontinued.

Public voting is conducted via a toll-free number, the ABC website, and, most recently, text messages and Facebook; contestants can vote during and immediately after each performance show. The maximum number of votes per voter per medium is equal to the number of couples performing that night, or five votes, whichever is larger. In April 2010, it was revealed that former contestant Kate Gosselin had e-mailed friends and family asking them to vote as many as 10 times each. In November 2010, The Washington Post reported that online voting appeared not to require a valid email address, and accordingly that numerous votes apparently could be cast by one person.

In several cases where ESPN coverage of Monday Night Football airs instead on an ABC affiliate in an NFL team's home market, the program is delayed to air immediately after that station's local news, Jimmy Kimmel Live!, and Nightline, and a voting window confined only to the area codes of the pre-empted market is opened up to allow affected viewers to still put their votes in for the competition, though this is on a market-by-market basis (in some markets, an alternate sister station or digital subchannel carries the program live as scheduled).

Seasons 1 and 3 featured only two couples in the final week instead of three. Starting with season 16, four couples made it into the final week, although the top three finalists proceeded to dance one more time for the judges the next night after the fourth-place couple was announced. In seasons 20, 22, 24, and 26 there were three couples in the final week, but in seasons 21, 23, 25, 27–31 there were four, however in season 32, there was a change and five couples made it to the final.

Starting in season 28, the two couples with the lowest combined total of judges' scores and viewer voting percentages are in the bottom two and in jeopardy of being eliminated. The judges can save one of the bottom two couples from elimination in these seasons so that more talented competitors are kept. In situations of a double elimination in which three teams are at risk of elimination, the couple with the lowest combined total of judges' scores and viewer votes is eliminated, and the other two couples will face the judges' decision, who have to vote to save one couple from elimination. However, for season 32, this was removed and reverted to the original rules used in the first 27 seasons.

== General information ==
=== Payment ===
On the April 18, 2006, episode of the Howard Stern Radio Show, Stern's wife Beth said that she was guaranteed to earn $125,000 for just appearing on DWTS (in season 3) and could earn up to more than double the original sum, depending on how long she lasted on the program.

In season 21, Bindi Irwin had her payments withheld by a Los Angeles County Superior Court judge because she was a minor, which therefore required her parents to sign-off on the contract. But although her mother signed, the contract lacked her father's signature, so the judge refused to validate the contract, despite Irwin's father being naturalist and television personality Steve Irwin, who died in a stingray incident in 2006. The judge later validated the contract once Steve Irwin's death certificate was presented to the court, resulting in Bindi receiving a $350,000 paycheck from the show.

=== Withdrawals ===
The first person to withdraw from competition was Romeo in season 2. His father, Master P, replaced him in the competition before the beginning of broadcasts, being partnered with Ashly DelGrosso. However, Romeo later competed in season 12 and finished in 5th place. He was partnered with Chelsie Hightower.

On week six in season three, Sara Evans withdrew during the competition, citing her divorce as the reason for her departure. No one was eliminated that week. Another withdrawal occurred during preparations for season four on February 28, when Vincent Pastore withdrew from the competition after only one week of training. Pastore said he did not realize how much work was needed during a ten-week period, and that he was not up to the physical demands of the show. He was replaced on March 2 by actor John Ratzenberger who was partnered with Edyta Śliwińska.

In season seven, Misty May-Treanor withdrew from the competition in week three, after rupturing her Achilles tendon when rehearsing her jive with her partner, Maksim Chmerkovskiy. She did not perform the routine at all nor was she scored for it; no one else was eliminated that week.

In season eight, Jewel and Nancy O'Dell were injured before the season began and could not compete. Jewel was diagnosed with fractured tibias in both legs; she would perform "Somewhere Over the Rainbow" on a results show. O'Dell suffered from a torn knee cartilage. They were replaced by Holly Madison and Melissa Rycroft who would be dancing with their partners for the rest of the season (Dmitry Chaplin and Tony Dovolani).

Tom DeLay, in season nine, withdrew in week three of competition due to a full stress fracture that had developed in both feet from an earlier pre-stress fracture in one foot. DeLay was declared safe before he announced his withdrawal during the October 6, 2009, results show. Debi Mazar was still eliminated that night despite DeLay's departure.

In season sixteen, Olympic figure skating champion Dorothy Hamill had to withdraw from the competition due to doctor's orders for a spinal injury. A cyst had developed near her lower spine, and was pinching off the nerve in that area. Either boxing champion Victor Ortiz or reality television star Lisa Vanderpump would have been eliminated, but Hamill withdrew before the results could be announced, meaning that no one was eliminated that week.

In season eighteen, week three, actor Billy Dee Williams withdrew, by advice from a doctor, due to a chronic back problem, which resulted in no elimination that week.

In season twenty-one, week three, reality television star Kim Zolciak-Biermann was forced to withdraw from the competition after suffering a blood clot which resulted in a mini stroke, which resulted in no elimination that week. Tamar Braxton also withdrew from the season due to blood clots in her lungs making it the first season to have two withdrawals in it.

In season twenty eight, Christie Brinkley withdrew from the competition a week before the season premiere, due to injuring her arm during rehearsal and needing sudden surgery. She was replaced by her daughter, Sailor, with only a few days to practice prior to the season premiere. Later that season, Ray Lewis withdrew from the competition in the third week due to a toe injury he sustained during rehearsal that needed surgery.

In Season 29 during the 8th week, television host Jeannie Mai withdrew from the show after being hospitalized for epiglottitis. As a result, the double elimination that was supposed to happen did not take place. Only one couple, Chrishell Stause and Gleb Savchenko, were eliminated that night.

In Season 31 during the 5th week, movie star Selma Blair withdrew from the show to prevent her health from further deteriorating due to her multiple sclerosis. This marks the first time where a celebrity got the first perfect score of the season and withdrew on the same episode. As a result, there was no elimination that first night of the 5th week.

== Special episodes ==
=== Season 1 Dance Off ===
Following controversy over Kelly Monaco surging from behind to win the first mirror ball trophy over the consistently strong John O'Hurley, ABC arranged for a "Dance Off" episode for a rematch on September 20, 2005. Both contestants were reunited with their professional dance partners, Alec Mazo (Monaco) and Charlotte Jørgensen (O'Hurley). Judges Len Goodman, Carrie Ann Inaba, and Bruno Tonioli awarded O'Hurley and Jørgensen with 77 points and Monaco and Mazo with 74, but for this specific competition only the audience vote counted. As announced by Tom Bergeron on September 22, the audience vote gave the rematch victory to O'Hurley with a slim 1% edge.

Many considered this rematch a mistake and Kelly Monaco retains her title as the winner of season 1. A rematch episode was never staged again.

=== 100th episode ===
The show celebrated its 100th episode on May 6, 2008, during week 8 of season 6. More than 30 former cast members and pros returned, with interviews with Stacy Keibler, Lisa Rinna, Jerry Springer, Vivica A. Fox, Joey Fatone, Kenny Mayne, Sabrina Bryan, and former winners Kelly Monaco, Drew Lachey, and Apolo Anton Ohno. Other appearances, besides the season 6 cast, included Paula Abdul (in a video introduction), Jane Seymour, Ian Ziering, Mark Cuban, Wayne Newton, Leeza Gibbons, Harry Hamlin, Shandi Finnessey, and Hélio Castroneves. New routines were performed by Apolo Anton Ohno and Julianne Hough, Mel B and Maksim Chmerkovskiy, and by Mario Lopez with the cast of A Chorus Line, in which he was starring on Broadway. The musical guest was country group Rascal Flatts.

Judges' top 10 dances

The judges also presented a countdown of their choices for the top 10 perfect-scoring dances of the first five seasons. Their choices were:

No.	Celebrity	Professional	Season	Week	Dance
1	Mario Lopez	Karina Smirnoff	3	9	Tango
2	Mel B	Maksim Chmerkovskiy	5	7	Paso doble
3	Stacy Keibler	Tony Dovolani	2	8	Samba
4	Drew Lachey	Cheryl Burke	2	8	Freestyle
5	Helio Castroneves	Julianne Hough	5	8	Quickstep
6	Joey Fatone	Kym Johnson	4	7	Jive
7	Apolo Anton Ohno	Julianne Hough	4	9	Quickstep
8	Emmitt Smith	Cheryl Burke	3	9	Cha-cha-cha
9	Sabrina Bryan	Mark Ballas	5	4	Paso doble
10	Kelly Monaco	Alec Mazo	1	6	Freestyle

=== 200th episode ===
In season 11, viewers were allowed two votes per day on the DWTS website to vote for their favorite out of 30 given choices. On October 25, 2010, a countdown of the Top 10 voted-for dances on the show was reported to celebrate the following week when the 200th show would be.

No.	Celebrity	Professional	Season	Week	Dance
1	Drew Lachey	Cheryl Burke	2	8	Freestyle
2	Gilles Marini	Cheryl Burke	8	4	Argentine tango
3	Apolo Anton Ohno	Julianne Hough	4	5	Samba
4	Nicole Scherzinger	Derek Hough	10	8	1950s Paso doble
5	Mel B	Maksim Chmerkovskiy	5	7	Paso doble
6	Joanna Krupa	Derek Hough	9	8	Futuristic Paso doble
7	Apolo Anton Ohno	Julianne Hough	4	10	Freestyle
8	Helio Castroneves	Julianne Hough	5	8	Quickstep
9	Donny Osmond	Kym Johnson	9	5	Argentine tango
10	Shawn Johnson	Mark Ballas	8	11	Freestyle

On the actual 200th show, several dances were performed again on the show and six of the fan favorites return to judge; including Helio Castroneves, Emmitt Smith, Drew Lachey, Kelly Osbourne, Gilles Marini, and Mel B. The couples re-created their most memorable routines on the 200th episode; Kristi Yamaguchi and Apolo Ohno served as team captains for the team dances. Yamaguchi's team consisted of Rick & Cheryl, Kyle & Lacey and Bristol & Mark, while Brandy & Maksim, Jennifer & Derek and Kurt & Anna were on Ohno's team. On the results show of November 2, some awards were given out to former celebrity contestants and professionals.

Category	Winner
Most Dramatic Moment	Marie Osmond
Worst Dancer	Kenny Mayne
Biggest Dancer Transformation	Louis van Amstel

=== 300th episode ===
The show's 300th episode was on the week 9 results show of season 16. Twenty-two professional dancers who had appeared on the show, both past and present, performed an opening number choreographed by Jason Gilkinson. Former pros who performed were Chelsie Hightower, Dmitry Chaplin, Louis Van Amstel, and Anna Trebunskaya. Kellie Pickler and Derek Hough danced their "Argentine tango" as the week's encore. However, the top 10 dances were not revealed, nor were the achievements.

=== 400th episode ===
The 400th episode was the season premiere of the twenty-fourth season. Tom Bergeron did mention the milestone, although no special dances took place.

=== 10th anniversary special ===
On April 28, 2015, during season 20, a special pre-recorded episode aired as a 10th anniversary special with many former stars and professional dancers returning to the ballroom. Many former stars performed and reflected on their time on the show. Patti LaBelle, Amber Riley, and Lil' Kim performed LaBelle's "Lady Marmalade". The show closed with the largest number of people dancing in the show's history as stars, pros, hosts, and judges were all out on the dance floor.

=== Dancing with the Stars: The Pros' Most Memorable Dances ===
Brandon Armstrong, Cheryl Burke, Kym Herjavec, and Derek Hough hosted the Dancing with the Stars: The Pros' Most Memorable Dances where they showed the 20 most memorable dances in the history of the show's thirty seasons. It premiered on Disney+ on September 8, 2022.

No.	Couple	Dance	Season
1	Drew Lachey & Cheryl Burke	Freestyle	2
2	Iman Shumpert & Daniella Karagach	Contemporary	30
3	Alfonso Ribeiro & Witney Carson	Jazz	19
4	Hélio Castroneves & Julianne Hough	Quickstep	5
5	Derek Hough & Hayley Erbert	Paso doble	29
6	Kaitlyn Bristowe & Artem Chigvintsev	Argentine tango	29
7	JoJo Siwa & Jenna Johnson	Freestyle	30
8	Meryl Davis & Maksim Chmerkovskiy	Tango	18
9	Jordan Fisher & Lindsay Arnold	Paso doble	25
10	Kellie Pickler & Derek Hough	Freestyle	16
11	Nyle DiMarco & Peta Murgatroyd	Freestyle	22
12	Disney Night Opening Number		28
13	Nev Schulman & Jenna Johnson	Paso doble	29
14	Amy Purdy & Derek Hough	Quickstep	18
15	Joey Fatone & Kym Johnson	Jive	4
16	Shawn Johnson & Mark Ballas	Lindy Hop	8
17	Zendaya & Val Chmerkovskiy	Cha-cha	16
18	NFL Supergroup	Paso doble	20
19	Kim Kardashian & Mark Ballas	Mambo	7
20	Emmitt Smith & Cheryl Burke	Freestyle	3

=== 500th episode ===
The show celebrated its 500th episode on November 12, 2024, during week 7 of season 33. In the first round, each couple reinterpreted a memorable dance from a previous season. The second round was the Instant Dance Challenge, in which they had approximately five minutes to choreograph and learn a new dance before performing it live. Although the assigned dance styles and songs were not known beforehand by the couples, they were told that it would be one of four dance styles they had performed earlier in the season.

The opening number was choreographed by Pasha Pashkov and Daniella Karagach to "Crazy in Love" by Beyoncé featuring Jay-Z, the same song that opened the first season of Dancing with the Stars. It featured special appearances from Derek Hough, Julianne Hough, and Sharna Burgess.

More than 20 former pros and cast members returned, with appearances by Allison Holker, Mark Ballas, Lindsay Arnold, Anna Trebunskaya, Elena Grinenko, Maksim Chmerkovskiy, Peta Murgatroyd, Artem Chigvintsev, Kristi Yamaguchi, Cody Linley, Melissa Rycroft, Amy Purdy, Ginger Zee, Terra Jolé, Lindsey Stirling, Adam Rippon, Kate Flannery, AJ McLean, Kaitlyn Bristowe, Brian Austin Green, Amanda Kloots, and Alyson Hannigan.

=== 20th anniversary special ===
On November 11, 2025, during season 34, the show celebrated its 20th anniversary with the "20th birthday party". Each couple reinterpreted a memorable freestyle performance by showcasing an unlearned dance style. The celebrities danced in the relay round with a returning mirrorball champion. This included Apolo Anton Ohno, Joey Graziadei, Kaitlyn Bristowe, Rashad Jennings, Rumer Willis, and Xochitl Gomez. Former host Tom Bergeron returned as a guest judge.

The opening number featured the current lineup of professional dancers and troupe members, as well as the six original pros from the first season: Alec Mazo, Ashly DelGrosso, Louis van Amstel, Jonathan Roberts, Charlotte Jørgensen, and Edyta Śliwińska. The episode also honored deceased Dancing with the Stars performers with an in memoriam tribute.

Multiple former professional dancers returned, including Lindsay Arnold, Corky Ballas, Sharna Burgess, Cheryl Burke, Brittany Cherry, Artem Chigvintsev, Maksim Chmerkovskiy, Ashly DelGrosso, Anna Demidova, Hayley Erbert, Sasha Farber, Brian Fortuna, Elena Grinenko, Chelsie Hightower, Marcquet Hill, Allison Holker, Koko Iwasaki, Charlotte Jørgensen, Alec Mazo, Keo Motsepe, Peta Murgatroyd, Kiki Nyemchek, Jonathan Roberts, Kailyn Rogers, Edyta Śliwińska, Stephani Sosa, Tyne Stecklein, Anna Trebunskaya, Louis van Amstel, and Damian Whitewood.

In addition to the former cast members, mentioned above, who danced in the second round, numerous former cast members also returned: Monica Aldama, Victoria Arlen, Joseph Baena, Mischa Barton, Bonner Bolton, Sailor Brinkley Cook, Sabrina Bryan, Candace Cameron Bure, Charo, Christine Chiu, Margaret Cho, Heidi D'Amelio, Juan Pablo Di Pace, Donald Driver, Daniel Durant, Danielle Fishel, Kate Flannery, Noah Galloway, Debbie Gibson, Brian Austin Green, Alyson Hannigan, Melora Hardin, Melissa Joan Hart, Marilu Henner, Scott Hoying, Bindi Irwin, Skai Jackson, Matt James, Jessie James Decker, Shawn Johnson, Terra Jolé, Harry Jowsey, Chandler Kinney, Amanda Kloots, Ricki Lake, Joey Lawrence, Charity Lawson, Cody Linley, Nastia Liukin, Ariana Madix, Ilona Maher, Jeannie Mai, Gilles Marini, Cameron Mathison, Marlee Matlin, Chris Mazdzer, Danica McKellar, Kelly Monaco, Kenya Moore, Bethany Mota, Ty Murray, Mirai Nagasu, Stephen Nedoroscik, Wayne Newton, Bill Nye, John O'Hurley, Jake Pavelka, Lele Pons, Amy Purdy, Alexis Ren, Lisa Rinna, Adam Rippon, Eric Roberts, Sadie Robertson, Melissa Rycroft, Shangela, Nev Schulman, Emmitt Smith, Chris Soules, Tori Spelling, Chrishell Stause, Lindsey Stirling, Sean Spicer, Trista Sutter, Jenn Tran, Aiden Turner, Mauricio Umansky, Danelle Umstead, Reginald VelJohnson, Louie Vito, Jaleel White, Chuck Wicks, Kristi Yamaguchi, Ginger Zee, and Ian Ziering.

== Merchandise, tours, and spin-offs ==
=== Cardio dance DVDs ===
A DVD titled Dancing with the Stars: Cardio Dance was released on April 3, 2007, featuring Kym Johnson, Maksim Chmerkovskiy and Ashly DelGrosso. The program contains cardiovascular workouts adapted from cha-cha, paso doble, samba, and jive dance routines.

A second DVD titled Dancing with the Stars: Latin Cardio Dance was released on September 13, 2008, featuring Maksim Chmerkovskiy and Cheryl Burke. The program contains cardiovascular workouts adapted from cha-cha, Merengue, samba and mambo dance routines.

=== Companion book ===
A companion book written by Guy Phillips was released in September 2007. Titled Dancing with the Stars: Jive, Samba and Tango Your Way into the Best Shape of Your Life, the book includes fitness routines modeled by Alec Mazo and Edyta Śliwińska, as well as original costume designs, lists of performed songs during a dance, and a complete list of song-and-dance routine performed since the first season of the show.

=== Spin-offs ===
The first Dancing spin-off, Dance War: Bruno vs. Carrie Ann, premiered on January 7, 2008, on ABC. The show's format was similar to the BBC Television series, DanceX. The show was canceled after one season.

A figure skating spin-off similar to ITV's Dancing on Ice called Skating with the Stars aired on ABC on November 22, 2010. The series was canceled after one season.

On May 16, 2017, another spin-off, Dancing with the Stars: Juniors, was announced. The dance competition spin-off was originally set to premiere on ABC in spring 2018. The format of the show featured celebrity children and the children of celebrities paired with professional junior ballroom dancers. In January 2018, ABC said that Dancing with the Stars: Juniors was still in development, but did not progress as quickly as planned. Instead, Dancing with the Stars: Athletes aired in its place, while Juniors had initially been scheduled for a summer release. In May 2018, it was announced that the show would premiere on October 7, 2018, with the episodes filmed in August 2018. Professional skateboarder Sky Brown, junior pro JT Church and pro mentor Alan Bersten were announced as the winners on December 9, 2018. The show was canceled after one season.

A fourth spin-off, Dancing with the Stars: The Next Pro, premiered on July 13, 2026. It featured up-and-coming professional dancers living in a house together who competed in an audition process to determine who would join the main series as a pro, beginning with season 35. The sixth episode of the series marked the first time that fans of the series participated as partners for a potential Dancing with the Stars professional dancer. The five fans who participated were notable social media influencers, Jeremy Urann, Zaira Yzabelle, Jay Wyson, Bailey McKnight and Anthony Riccardo.

=== Dancing with the Stars: The Game ===
In 2016, ABC, together with BBC Worldwide, commissioned a companion mobile game. The match-3 game, published by Donut Publishing and developed by Exient, uses a mix of hand animation and motion-captured data for the dances in the game. The game uses pro dancers from Strictly Come Dancing, and features nine dances: Quickstep, Jive, Tango, Salsa, Charleston, Viennese Waltz, Rumba, Cha Cha Cha, and Paso Doble.

=== Tours ===
An unofficial live tour show called Dancing Pros: Live! toured with several Dancing pros since 2010. A Dancing with the Stars: Live! official tour was announced on November 3, 2014, for the 2014–2015 season starting on December 27, 2014, in Niagara Falls, New York, and ending February 15, 2015, performing in 33 cities. A second tour, Dancing with the Stars Live!: Dance All Night, was announced. A third tour, Dancing with the Stars: Live! – We Came to Dance, was announced on October 3, 2016, for 43 cities from December 16, 2016, to February 14, 2017. A fourth tour, Dancing with the Stars: Light Up the Night, was announced in October 2017 and began on December 30, 2017, in Charlotte, North Carolina, performing 71 shows and ending in Los Angeles. A fifth tour, Dancing with the Stars: A Night to Remember, was announced on October 1, 2018. The tour began on December 15, 2018, in Columbia, South Carolina, and ended on March 9, 2019, in Thousand Oaks, California.

The 2020 tour, Dancing with the Stars Live! – 2020 Tour, began on January 9, 2020, in Richmond, Virginia and was originally supposed to run until April 7, 2020. However, beginning with the show scheduled for March 13, 2020, in Rockford, Illinois, the remaining tour dates were postponed due to the COVID-19 pandemic before eventually being canceled altogether. The 2022 tour, Dancing with the Stars Live! – 2022 Tour, began on January 7, 2022, in Richmond, Virginia, and ended on March 27, 2022, in Modesto, California. The 2023 tour, Dancing with the Stars Live 2023, began on January 6, 2023, in National Harbor, Maryland, and ended on March 12, 2023, in Las Vegas, Nevada. The 2024 tour, Dancing with the Stars Live 2024, started on January 11, 2024, in Richmond, Virginia, and ended on March 26, 2024, in Los Angeles, California. The 2025 tour, Dancing with the Stars: Live! 2025 Tour, began on January 9, 2025, in Baltimore, Maryland, and ended on April 19, 2025 in Rosemont, Illinois. The 2026 tour, DWTS: Live!, began on January 22, 2026, in Akron, Ohio, and ended on May 13, 2026, also in Akron, Ohio. The 2027 tour, Dancing with the Stars: Live, will begin on January 21, 2027 in Manchester, New Hampshire and end on April 11, 2027 in Duluth, Georgia.

Tour name	Running dates	Companion season	Participating professional dancers	Participating celebrity dancers/hosts
Dancing with the Stars: Live!	December 27, 2014 – February 15, 2015	Season 19	Mark Ballas, Witney Carson, Brittany Cherry, Valentin Chmerkovskiy, Sasha Farber, Brooklyn Fullmer, Kym Johnson, Paul Karmiryan, Keo Motsepe, and Emma Slater	Alfonso Ribeiro
Dancing with the Stars Live!: Perfect Ten Tour	June 13, 2015 – August 11, 2015	Season 20	Witney Carson, Alan Bersten, Brittany Cherry, Artem Chigvintsev, Valentin Chmerkovskiy, Sasha Farber, Jenna Johnson, Peta Murgatroyd, and Emma Slater	Melissa Rycroft
Dancing with the Stars Live!: Dance All Night	December 15, 2015 – February 14, 2016	Season 21	Lindsay Arnold, Sharna Burgess, Alan Bersten, Brittany Cherry, Artem Chigvintsev, Valentin Chmerkovskiy, Jenna Johnson, Keo Motsepe, Peta Murgatroyd and Emma Slater	Alek Skarlatos
Dancing with the Stars Live!: We Came to Dance	December 16, 2016 – February 14, 2017	Season 23	Lindsay Arnold, Alan Bersten, Sharna Burgess, Artem Chigvintsev, Valentin Chmerkovskiy, Hayley Erbert, Jenna Johnson, Keo Motsepe, Gleb Savchenko, and Emma Slater	Laurie Hernandez
Dancing with the Stars Live!: Hot Summer Nights	June 16, 2017 – August 13, 2017	Season 24	Lindsay Arnold, Alan Bersten, Sharna Burgess, Artem Chigvintsev, Hayley Erbert, Sasha Farber, Keo Motsepe, Gleb Savchenko, Emma Slater, and Britt Stewart	Rashad Jennings and Heather Morris
Dancing with the Stars: Live – Light Up the Night	December 30, 2017 – March 2018	Season 25	Brandon Armstrong, Lindsay Arnold, Alan Bersten, Sharna Burgess, Artem Chigvintsev, Hayley Erbert, Sasha Farber, Jenna Johnson, Morgan Larson, Keo Motsepe, Gleb Savchenko, and Emma Slater	Jordan Fisher and Frankie Muniz
Dancing with the Stars: A Night to Remember	December 15, 2018 – March 9, 2019	Season 27	Brandon Armstrong, Alan Bersten, Witney Carson, Artem Chigvintsev, Valentin Chmerkovskiy, Hayley Erbert, Sasha Farber, Jenna Johnson, Gleb Savchenko, Emma Slater, and Britt Stewart	Joe Amabile, Bobby Bones, Rashad Jennings, Juan Pablo di Pace and Milo Manheim
Dancing with the Stars Live! – 2020 Tour	January 9, 2020 – March 12, 2020	Season 28	Brandon Armstrong, Lindsay Arnold, Alan Bersten, Witney Carson, Valentin Chmerkovskiy, Sasha Farber, Jenna Johnson, Daniella Karagach, Pasha Pashkov, Gleb Savchenko and Emma Slater	Ally Brooke, Hannah Brown, Kel Mitchell, Lauren Alaina, Kate Flannery, and Sailor Brinkley-Cook
Dancing with the Stars Live! – 2022 Tour	January 7, 2022 – March 27, 2022	Season 30	Brandon Armstrong, Alan Bersten, Artem Chigvintsev, Sasha Farber, Sofia Ghavami, Koko Iwasaki, Daniella Karagach, Kiki Nyemchek, Pasha Pashkov, Gleb Savchenko, Emma Slater, Britt Stewart, and Alexis Warr Burton	Jimmie Allen, Kaitlyn Bristowe, Amanda Kloots, and Iman Shumpert
Dancing with the Stars Live 2023	January 6, 2023 – March 12, 2023	Season 31	Brandon Armstrong, Mark Ballas, Alan Bersten, Sasha Farber, Kateryna Klishyna, Gleb Savchenko, Emma Slater, Britt Stewart, and Alexis Warr Burton	Charli D'Amelio, Heidi D'Amelio, Daniel Durant, Vinny Guadagnino, and Gabby Windey
Dancing with the Stars Live 2024	January 11, 2024 – March 26, 2024	Season 32	Brandon Armstrong, Rylee Arnold, Alan Bersten, Artem Chigvintsev, Valentin Chmerkovskiy, Jenna Johnson, Daniella Karagach, Pasha Pashkov, Gleb Savchenko, Emma Slater, and Britt Stewart	Xochitl Gomez, Harry Jowsey, and Charity Lawson
Dancing with the Stars: Live! 2025 Tour	January 9, 2025 – April 19, 2025	Season 33	Brandon Armstrong, Rylee Arnold / Kailyn Rogers, Alan Bersten, Jenna Johnson, Daniella Karagach, Pasha Pashkov, Gleb Savchenko, Emma Slater, Ezra Sosa, and Britt Stewart	Joey Graziadei, Chandler Kinney, Ilona Maher, and Stephen Nedoroscik
DWTS: Live!	January 22, 2026 – May 13, 2026	Season 34	Brandon Armstrong, Alan Bersten, Hailey Bills, Witney Carson, Jenna Johnson, Valentin Chmerkovskiy, Daniella Karagach, Pasha Pashkov, Emma Slater, Ezra Sosa, and Britt Stewart	Jordan Chiles, Alix Earle, Dylan Efron, Danielle Fishel, Elaine Hendrix, Robert Irwin, and Andy Richter
Dancing with the Stars: Live	January 21, 2027 – April 11, 2027	Season 35	Brandon Armstrong, Rylee Arnold, Alan Bersten, Hailey Bills, Sharna Burgess, Valentin Chmerkovskiy, Jenna Johnson, Kamri Peterson, Emma Slater, Ezra Sosa, Onye Stevenson, Britt Stewart, Jaxon Willard, Carter Williams, and Adele Zaikman	TBA

=== Fan convention ===
A three-day fan convention, featuring appearances from professional dancers and former celebrity contestants, was held at Acrisure Arena in Palm Springs, California from July 31 to August 2, 2026. The convention featured two live dance performances, a game show, interactive live panels, Q&A sessions, photo experiences, and exhibits.

No.	Dates	Attendance	Participating professional dancers	Participating celebrity contestants
1	July 31–August 2, 2026	TBA	Brandon Armstrong, Lindsay Arnold, Rylee Arnold, Alan Bersten, Hailey Bills, Sharna Burgess, Kym Johnson, Val Chmerkovskiy, Sasha Farber, Jenna Johnson, Daniella Karagach, Pasha Pashkov, Jan Ravnik, Gleb Savchenko, Emma Slater, Ezra Sosa and Britt Stewart	Hannah Brown, Danielle Fishel, Joey Graziadei, Elaine Hendrix, Rashad Jennings, Amanda Kloots, Chandler Kinney, Kate Flannery, Andy Richter, Phaedra Parks, Jojo Siwa, Johnny Weir, Rumer Willis, Kristi Yamaguchi and Ginger Zee

== Reception ==
In 2016, a New York Times study of the 50 television shows with the most Facebook Likes found that "unlike So You Think You Can Dance, which is generally more of a city show, Dancing with the Stars is most popular in the countryside. It also has a higher share of 'likes' from viewers aged 65 and up than any other show."

Coverage has noted the evolving reception of Dancing with the Stars among younger audiences, particularly Generation Z. The New York Times reported that the show has gained visibility on platforms such as TikTok, where performance clips attract younger viewers. Coverage has also emphasized its continued cross-generational appeal, combining renewed interest from long-time viewers with attention from younger audiences through challenging stereotypes, entry to dance, trends in dance styles, iconic choreography, and lasting impact.

The mid-2020s brought on a resurgence in viewership and popularity for Dancing with the Stars. The season 34 finale drew in 9.24 million viewers, which is a 45% increase from the previous season's finale and the series' largest finale audience in nine years. Social media coverage, such as on TikTok, attributed to the show's renewed popularity among younger viewers. The casting of contestants with established younger online audiences was also cited as a factor in the increase in viewership.

=== U.S. Nielsen ratings ===
Season	Timeslot (ET)	No. of episodes	Season premiere		Season finale		Television season	Viewership ranking	Viewers (in millions)
Season	Timeslot (ET)	No. of episodes	Date	Viewers (in millions)	Date	Viewers (in millions)	Television season	Viewership ranking	Viewers (in millions)
1	Wednesday 9:00pm	6	June 1, 2005	13.48	July 6, 2005	22.36	2004–05	—N/a	
2	Thursday 8:00pm Friday 8:00pm	16	January 5, 2006	17.46	February 26, 2006	27.23	2005–06	7; 15	18.64; 16.67
3	Tuesday 8:00pm Wednesday 8:00pm	20	September 12, 2006	20.22	November 15, 2006	27.51	2006–07	3; 7	20.70; 19.40
4	Monday 8:00pm Tuesday 9:00pm	19	March 19, 2007	21.80	May 22, 2007	22.96	2006–07	5; 9	20.00; 18.20
5	Monday 8:00pm Tuesday 9:00pm	21	September 24, 2007	21.25	November 27, 2007	24.87	2007–08	3; 5	21.67; 19.56
6	Monday 8:00pm Tuesday 9:00pm	20	March 17, 2008	21.15	May 20, 2008	20.12	2007–08	4; 8	19.58; 18.03
7	Monday 8:00pm Tuesday 9:00pm	21	September 22, 2008	21.34	November 25, 2008	20.65	2008–09	3; 7	19.77; 16.31
8	Monday 8:00pm Tuesday 9:00pm	21	March 9, 2009	22.83	May 19, 2009	20.31	2008–09	3; 7	19.77; 16.31
9	Monday 8:00pm Tuesday 9:00pm	21	September 21, 2009	17.79	November 24, 2009	19.29	2009–10	3; 10	19.73; 15.30
10	Monday 8:00pm Tuesday 8:00pm	19	March 22, 2010	24.19	May 25, 2010	18.40	2009–10	3; 10	19.73; 15.30
11	Monday 8:00pm Tuesday 9:00pm	20	September 20, 2010	21.30	November 23, 2010	24.13	2010–11	3; 6	21.93; 18.61
12	Monday 8:00pm Tuesday 9:00pm	19	March 21, 2011	22.65	May 24, 2011	21.42	2010–11	3; 6	21.93; 18.61
13	Monday 8:00pm Tuesday 9:00pm	20	September 19, 2011	19.03	November 22, 2011	19.45	2011–12	5; 6	18.24; 16.08
14	Monday 8:00pm Tuesday 9:00pm	19	March 19, 2012	18.79	May 22, 2012	17.75	2011–12	5; 6	18.24; 16.08
15	Monday 8:00pm Tuesday 8:00pm	19	September 24, 2012	14.11	November 27, 2012	16.73	2012–13	7; 11	14.85; 13.78
16	Monday 8:00pm Tuesday 8:00pm	20	March 18, 2013	17.06	May 21, 2013	15.20	2012–13	7; 11	14.85; 13.78
17	Monday 8:00pm	12	September 16, 2013	16.04	November 26, 2013	14.75	2013–14	5	15.20
18	Monday 8:00pm	12	March 17, 2014	15.44	May 20, 2014	15.07	2013–14	5	15.20
19	Monday 8:00pm Tuesday 8:00pm	15	September 15, 2014	13.64	November 25, 2014	15.98	2014–15	9; 38	14.73; 10.82
20	Monday 8:00pm Tuesday 8:00pm	14	March 16, 2015	14.16	May 19, 2015	13.49	2014–15	9; 38	14.73; 10.82
21	Monday 8:00pm Tuesday 8:00pm	14	September 14, 2015	13.13	November 24, 2015	13.49	2015–16	8	13.44
22	Monday 8:00pm	11	March 21, 2016	12.46	May 24, 2016	10.49	2015–16	8	13.44
23	Monday 8:00pm Tuesday 8:00pm	15	September 12, 2016	12.19	November 22, 2016	10.97	2016–17	14	12.38
24	Monday 8:00pm	11	March 20, 2017	12.09	May 23, 2017	8.91	2016–17	14	12.38
25	Monday 8:00pm Tuesday 9:00pm	12	September 18, 2017	10.71	November 21, 2017	9.20	2017–18	22	10.60
26	Monday 8:00pm	4	April 30, 2018	8.48	May 21, 2018	8.77	2017–18	22	10.60
27	Monday 8:00pm	11	September 24, 2018	7.68	November 19, 2018	7.90	2018–19	35	8.68
28	Monday 8:00pm	11	September 16, 2019	8.07	November 25, 2019	7.79	2019–20	36	7.84
29	Monday 8:00pm	11	September 14, 2020	8.12	November 23, 2020	6.41	2020–21	31	7.09
30	Monday 8:00pm	11	September 20, 2021	5.47	November 22, 2021	5.64	2021–22	38	6.36
32	Tuesday 8:00pm	11	September 26, 2023	4.78	December 5, 2023	5.50	2023–24	34	5.89
33	Tuesday 8:00pm	10	September 17, 2024	4.97	November 26, 2024	6.36	2024–25	33	5.94
34	Tuesday 8:00pm	11	September 16, 2025	5.28	November 25, 2025	9.43	2025–26	11	7.50
35	Tuesday 8:00pm		September 15, 2026	6.77	November 24, 2026		2026–27		

== See also ==
- Strictly Come Dancing, the original British version of the program
- Dancing with the Stars, list of international versions
