= Koko Iwasaki =

Japanese-born American dancer

Koko Iwasaki is a dancer based in Los Angeles, California in the US. She was born in Kanagawa, Japan, and raised in South Florida. She has performed alongside artists including Rihanna and Shakira.

She is known for being a professional partner on the television series Dancing with the Stars.

Iwasaki was a co-choreographer of the 2026 Geffen Playhouse production of the play "Master Harold"...and the Boys.
