= Dancing with the Stars (American TV series) season 3 =

Dancing with the Stars
- Season 3
- Promotional poster, featuring pro dancer Anna Trebunskaya
- Hosted by: Tom Bergeron; Samantha Harris
- Judges: Carrie Ann Inaba; Len Goodman; Bruno Tonioli
- Celebrity winner: Emmitt Smith
- Professional winner: Cheryl Burke
- No. of episodes: 20

Release
- Original network: ABC
- Original release: September 12 – November 15, 2006

Season chronology
- ← Previous; Season 2 Next → Season 4

Season three of Dancing with the Stars premiered on September 12, 2006, on the ABC network.

For this season, the scoring system was changed. Fan vote only counted for 25% of the total score and scoring was now translated directly from percentages rather than into ordinals. The judges scores were added up, and each performer was given points based on the percentage of the total points distributed among all performers. (For example, a team received a score of 25. A total of 207 points were awarded to all nine performers. The team received 12.08% of that total, so that team earned 12.08 points. The couple happens to be Sara & Tony.) The fan vote was handled the same way, with the points based on how much of the total fan vote the star received. (So, in the same example, if the team earned 15% of the total fan vote, their grand total is 27.08 points.)

On November 15, Dallas Cowboys running back Emmitt Smith and Cheryl Burke were crowned the champions, while actor Mario Lopez and Karina Smirnoff finished in second place, and actor Joey Lawrence and Edyta Śliwińska finished in third.

== Cast ==
=== Couples ===
This season featured eleven celebrity contestants. On October 12, 2006, Sara Evans announced her withdrawal from the competition to be with her children after filing for divorce from her husband. In a "final appearance", a pre-taped interview with Evans about her decision was shown on October 17. Willa Ford stated on Headline News' Robin & Company that ABC had invited her to return to the competition, but she declined. At the end of the October 18 results show, it was revealed that there would be no elimination for the week due to Evans' departure. The scores from week 6 carried over to week 7.

Celebrity	Notability	Professional partner	Status
Tucker Carlson	News anchor & commentator	Elena Grinenko	Eliminated 1st on September 13, 2006
Shanna Moakler	Model, actress & reality television personality	Jesse DeSoto	Eliminated 2nd on September 20, 2006
Harry Hamlin	Film & television actor	Ashly DelGrosso	Eliminated 3rd on September 27, 2006
Vivica A. Fox	Film actress & producer	Nick Kosovich	Eliminated 4th on October 4, 2006
Willa Ford	Pop singer & actress	Maksim Chmerkovskiy	Eliminated 5th on October 11, 2006
Sara Evans	Country music singer	Tony Dovolani	Withdrew on October 13, 2006
Jerry Springer	Talk show host	Kym Johnson	Eliminated 6th on October 25, 2006
Monique Coleman	High School Musical actress	Louis van Amstel	Eliminated 7th on November 1, 2006
Joey Lawrence	Television actor	Edyta Śliwińska	Eliminated 8th on November 8, 2006
Mario Lopez	Television actor & host	Karina Smirnoff	Runners-up on November 15, 2006
Emmitt Smith	NFL running back	Cheryl Burke	Winners on November 15, 2006

Future appearances

Emmitt Smith returned for the All-Stars season, where he was again paired with Cheryl Burke.

=== Hosts and judges ===
Tom Bergeron and Samantha Harris returned as co-hosts, while Carrie Ann Inaba, Len Goodman, and Bruno Tonioli returned as judges.

== Episodes ==
No. overall	No. in season	Title	Rating (18–49)	Original release date	U.S. viewers (millions)
25	1	"Round 1"	5.7/15	September 12, 2006	20.22
26	2	"Round 1 Results"	4.1/13	September 13, 2006	16.30
27	3	"Round 2"	5.2/14	September 19, 2006	17.92
28	4	"Round 2 Results"	3.7/11	September 20, 2006	14.79
29	5	"Round 3"	5.2/14	September 26, 2006	17.91
30	6	"Round 3 Results"	4.1/12	September 27, 2006	15.81
31	7	"Round 4"	5.2/14	October 3, 2006	18.38
32	8	"Round 4 Results"	4.5/13	October 4, 2006	17.49
33	9	"Round 5"	5.6/15	October 10, 2006	20.10
34	10	"Round 5 Results"	4.6/13	October 11, 2006	18.21
35	11	"Round 6"	6.0/16	October 17, 2006	21.25
36	12	"Round 6 Results"	5.0/14	October 18, 2006	19.23
37	13	"Round 7"	5.4/14	October 24, 2006	20.69
38	14	"Round 7 Results"	5.1/14	October 25, 2006	20.02
39	15	"Round 8"	5.3/15	October 31, 2006	20.51
40	16	"Round 8 Results"	4.8/13	November 1, 2006	19.22
41	17	"Semifinals"	5.9/14	November 7, 2006	21.98
42	18	"Semifinals Results"	5.2/14	November 8, 2006	20.68
43	19	"Finals"	7.5/20	November 14, 2006	26.80
44	20	"Finals Results"	7.1/19	November 15, 2006	27.51

== Scoring chart ==
The highest score each week is indicated in bold green with a dagger (†), while the lowest score each week is indicated in italicized red with a double-dagger (‡).

Color key:

Winners
Runners-up
Third place
Bottom two or three
Withdrew from competition
Eliminated

Dancing with the Stars (season 3) - Weekly scores
Couple	Pl.	Week											
Couple	Pl.	1	2	3	4	5	6	7	6+7	8	9	10	
Couple	Pl.	1	2	3	4	5	6	7	6+7	8	9	Night 1	Night 2
Emmitt & Cheryl	1st	24	24	19‡	24	**27**†	25	28+29=**57**†	82	25+29=54	29+30=**59**†	30+30=**60**†	+29=**89**† (Note: This couple finished in first place.)
Mario & Karina	2nd	**26**†	21	22	**29**†	**27**†	**28**†	29+27=56	**84**†	28+29=**57**†	30+29=**59**†	29+30=59‡	+30=**89**† (Note: This couple finished in second place.)
Joey & Edyta	3rd	21	**29**†	22	27	25	24 (Note: This couple was in the bottom two or three, but was not eliminated.)	29+28=**57**†	81	28+26=54	29+30=**59**† (Note: This couple was eliminated.)		
Monique & Louis	4th	19	26	**27**†	24	**27**†	23	27+27=54	77	24+29=53‡			
Jerry & Kym	5th	16	19‡	21	22	24‡	18‡	24+22=46‡	64‡				
Sara & Tony	6th	15	21	25	20‡	24‡	(Note: This couple withdrew from the competition.)						
Willa & Maks	7th	22	23	22	28	**27**†							
Vivica & Nick	8th	22	24	**27**†	24								
Harry & Ashly	9th	17	21	22									
Shanna & Jesse	10th	18	22										
Tucker & Elena	11th	12‡											

== Weekly scores ==
Individual judges' scores in the charts below (given in parentheses) are listed in this order from left to right: Carrie Ann Inaba, Len Goodman, Bruno Tonioli.

=== Week 1 ===
Each couple performed either the cha-cha-cha or the foxtrot. Couples are listed in the order they performed.

Couple	Scores	Dance	Music	Result
Joey & Edyta	21 (7, 7, 7)	Cha-cha-cha	"I Like The Way (You Move)" — Body Rockers	Safe
Sara & Tony	15 (5, 5, 5)	Foxtrot	"Mandy" — Barry Manilow	Safe
Tucker & Elena	12 (5, 4, 3)	Cha-cha-cha	"Dancing In The Street" — David Bowie & Mick Jagger	Eliminated
Monique & Louis	19 (6, 6, 7)	Foxtrot	"Baby Love" — The Supremes	Safe
Emmitt & Cheryl	24 (8, 8, 8)	Cha-cha-cha	"Son of a Preacher Man" — Dusty Springfield	Safe
Willa & Maks	22 (7, 7, 8)	Foxtrot	"True" — Spandau Ballet	Bottom three
Mario & Karina	26 (9, 8, 9)	Cha-cha-cha	"Walkin' on the Sun" — Smash Mouth	Safe
Shanna & Jesse	18 (7, 5, 6)	Foxtrot	"Saving All My Love For You" — Whitney Houston	Bottom three
Harry & Ashly	17 (5, 6, 6)	Cha-cha-cha	"Disco Inferno" — The Trammps	Safe
Vivica & Nick	22 (6, 8, 8)	Foxtrot	"I Just Wanna Make Love to You" — Etta James	Safe
Jerry & Kym	16 (5, 5, 6)	Cha-cha-cha	"Daddy" — Della Reese	Safe

=== Week 2 ===
Each couple performed either the mambo or the quickstep. Couples are listed in the order they performed.

Couple	Scores	Dance	Music	Result
Willa & Maks	23 (7, 8, 8)	Mambo	"Get Busy" — Sean Paul	Bottom two
Harry & Ashly	21 (7, 7, 7)	Quickstep	"Lust for Life" — Iggy Pop	Safe
Monique & Louis	26 (9, 8, 9)	Mambo	"Bop to the Top" — Ashley Tisdale & Lucas Grabeel	Safe
Mario & Karina	21 (7, 6, 8)	Quickstep	"Do Your Thing" — Basement Jaxx	Safe
Shanna & Jesse	22 (8, 7, 7)	Mambo	"Jump" — Kris Kross	Eliminated
Jerry & Kym	19 (7, 6, 6)	Quickstep	"Sing, Sing, Sing" — The Andrews Sisters	Safe
Vivica & Nick	24 (8, 8, 8)	Mambo	"Betece" — Africando All Stars	Safe
Joey & Edyta	29 (10, 9, 10)	Quickstep	"I Got Rhythm" — Ella Fitzgerald	Safe
Sara & Tony	21 (7, 7, 7)	Mambo	"Papa Loves Mambo" — Perry Como	Safe
Emmitt & Cheryl	24 (8, 8, 8)	Quickstep	"Black Horse and the Cherry Tree" — KT Tunstall	Safe

=== Week 3 ===
Each couple performed either the jive or the tango. Couples are listed in the order they performed.

Couple	Scores	Dance	Music	Result
Emmitt & Cheryl	19 (7, 6, 6)	Tango	"Simply Irresistible" — Robert Palmer	Safe
Monique & Louis	27 (9, 9, 9)	Jive	"The Heat Is On" — Glenn Frey	Safe
Harry & Ashly	22 (7, 8, 7)	Tango	"Santa Maria (Del Buen Ayre)" — Gotan Project	Eliminated
Willa & Maks	22 (7, 7, 8)	Jive	"SOS" — Rihanna	Safe
Jerry & Kym	21 (7, 7, 7)	Tango	"Hernando's Hideaway" — Ella Fitzgerald	Bottom two
Sara & Tony	25 (8, 9, 8)	Jive	"These Boots Are Made For Walkin'" — Nancy Sinatra	Safe
Mario & Karina	22 (8, 6, 8)	Tango	"What You Waiting For" — Gwen Stefani	Safe
Vivica & Nick	27 (9, 9, 9)	Tango	"Hey Sexy Lady" — Shaggy	Safe
Joey & Edyta	22 (8, 6, 8)	Jive	"Blue Suede Shoes" — Elvis Presley	Safe

=== Week 4 ===
Each couple performed either the paso doble or the waltz. Couples are listed in the order they performed.

Couple	Scores	Dance	Music	Result
Monique & Louis	24 (8, 8, 8)	Waltz	"If I Were A Painting" — Kenny Rogers	Bottom two
Emmitt & Cheryl	24 (8, 8, 8)	Paso doble	"España cañí" — Erich Kunzel	Safe
Willa & Maks	28 (9, 9, 10)	Waltz	"You Light Up My Life" — Debby Boone	Safe
Sara & Tony	20 (6, 7, 7)	Paso doble	"The Phantom of the Opera" — from The Phantom of the Opera	Safe
Jerry & Kym	22 (7, 7, 8)	Waltz	"Tennessee Waltz" — Patti Page	Safe
Vivica & Nick	24 (8, 8, 8)	Paso doble	"It's My Life" — Bon Jovi	Eliminated
Joey & Edyta	27 (9, 9, 9)	Waltz	"Take It to the Limit" — The Eagles	Safe
Mario & Karina	29 (10, 9, 10)	Paso doble	"Canción del Mariachi" — Los Lobos & Antonio Banderas	Safe

=== Week 5 ===
Each couple performed either the rumba or the samba. Couples are listed in the order they performed.

Couple	Scores	Dance	Music	Result
Joey & Edyta	25 (8, 8, 9)	Samba	"Freedom! '90" — George Michael	Safe
Willa & Maks	27 (9, 9, 9)	Rumba	"Every Breath You Take" — The Police	Eliminated
Sara & Tony	24 (8, 8, 8)	Samba	"I Wish" — Stevie Wonder	Safe
Mario & Karina	27 (9, 9, 9)	Rumba	"The Way You Look Tonight" — Michael Bublé	Safe
Jerry & Kym	24 (8, 8, 8)	Samba	"Eso Beso" — Paul Anka	Bottom two
Monique & Louis	27 (9, 9, 9)	Rumba	"So Nice" — Bebel Gilberto	Safe
Emmitt & Cheryl	27 (9, 9, 9)	Samba	"Cha Cha" — Chelo	Safe

=== Week 6 ===
Each couple performed one unlearned dance, plus a group disco dance. Due to Sara Evans' withdraw from the competition, there was no elimination at the end of the night. Couples are listed in the order they performed.

Couple	Scores	Dance	Music	Result
Mario & Karina	28 (9, 9, 10)	Mambo	"Ran Kan Kan" — Tito Puente	Safe
Monique & Louis	23 (9, 7, 7)	Samba	"ABC" — The Jackson 5	Safe
Joey & Edyta	24 (8, 8, 8)	Rumba	"Father Figure" — George Michael	Bottom two
Emmitt & Cheryl	25 (8, 8, 9)	Jive	"Lewis Boogie Blues" — T-Bone Burnett	Safe
Jerry & Kym	18 (7, 6, 5)	Paso doble	"Habañera" — Charlotte Church	Bottom two
Emmitt & Cheryl Jerry & Kym Joey & Edyta Mario & Karina Monique & Louis	No scores received	Group; Disco	"Don't Stop 'til You Get Enough" — Michael Jackson	

=== Week 7 ===
Each couple performed two unlearned dances. Couples are listed in the order they performed.

Couple	Scores	Dance	Music	Result
Jerry & Kym	24 (8, 8, 8)	Foxtrot	"My Way" — Frank Sinatra	Eliminated
Jerry & Kym	22 (7, 8, 7)	Mambo	"Annie, I'm Not Your Daddy" — Kid Creole and the Coconuts	Eliminated
Monique & Louis	27 (9, 9, 9)	Quickstep	"Luck Be a Lady" — Frank Sinatra	Bottom two
Monique & Louis	27 (9, 9, 9)	Paso doble	"The Reflex" — Duran Duran	Bottom two
Emmitt & Cheryl	28 (10, 9, 9)	Waltz	"Hushabye Mountain" — from Chitty Chitty Bang Bang	Safe
Emmitt & Cheryl	29 (10, 10, 9)	Mambo	"Que Bueno Baila Usted" — Oscar D'León	Safe
Mario & Karina	29 (10, 9, 10)	Foxtrot	"I Wanna Be Loved By You" — Marilyn Monroe	Safe
Mario & Karina	27 (9, 9, 9)	Jive	"Shake a Tail Feather" — Ray Charles & The Blues Brothers	Safe
Joey & Edyta	29 (10, 9, 10)	Foxtrot	"Singin' in the Rain" — Gene Kelly	Safe
Joey & Edyta	28 (9, 9, 10)	Mambo	"Mambo No. 5" — Lou Bega	Safe

=== Week 8: Halloween Week ===
Each couple performed two dances. Couples are listed in the order they performed.

Couple	Scores	Dance	Music	Result
Joey & Edyta	28 (10, 9, 9)	Tango	"The Addams Family Theme" — from The Addams Family	Safe
Joey & Edyta	26 (9, 8, 9)	Paso doble	"Sympathy for the Devil" — The Rolling Stones	Safe
Mario & Karina	28 (9, 9, 10)	Waltz	"Dark Waltz" — Hayley Westenra	Safe
Mario & Karina	29 (10, 9, 10)	Samba	"Superstition" — Stevie Wonder	Safe
Monique & Louis	24 (8, 8, 8)	Tango	"Somebody's Watching Me" — Rockwell	Eliminated
Monique & Louis	29 (9, 10, 10)	Cha-cha-cha	"Ghostbusters" — Ray Parker Jr.	Eliminated
Emmitt & Cheryl	25 (8, 8, 9)	Foxtrot	"Witchcraft" — Frank Sinatra	Safe
Emmitt & Cheryl	29 (9, 10, 10)	Rumba	"Spooky" — Dusty Springfield	Safe

=== Week 9 ===
Each couple performed two dances. Couples are listed in the order they performed.

Couple	Scores	Dance	Music	Result
Mario & Karina	30 (10, 10, 10)	Tango	"Whatever Lola Wants" — Gwen Verdon	Safe
Mario & Karina	29 (10, 9, 10)	Cha-cha-cha	"Bad" — Michael Jackson	Safe
Emmitt & Cheryl	29 (9, 10, 10)	Waltz	"At This Moment" — Billy Vera & The Beaters	Safe
Emmitt & Cheryl	30 (10, 10, 10)	Cha-cha-cha	"Dance to the Music" — Sly & The Family Stone	Safe
Joey & Edyta	29 (9, 10, 10)	Quickstep	"42nd Street" — Lee Roy Reams	Eliminated
Joey & Edyta	30 (10, 10, 10)	Rumba	"Eternal Flame" — The Bangles	Eliminated

=== Week 10 ===
Each couple performed three dances: the samba, their favorite dance of the season, and their freestyle routine. Couples are listed in the order they performed.

Couple	Scores	Dance	Music	Result
Emmitt & Cheryl	30 (10, 10, 10)	Samba	"Sir Duke" — Stevie Wonder	Winners
Emmitt & Cheryl	30 (10, 10, 10)	Mambo	"Que Bueno Baila Usted" — Oscar D'León	Winners
Emmitt & Cheryl	29 (10, 10, 9)	Freestyle	"U Can't Touch This" — MC Hammer	Winners
Mario & Karina	29 (10, 9, 10)	Samba	"Sir Duke" — Stevie Wonder	Runners-up
Mario & Karina	30 (10, 10, 10)	Paso doble	"Canción del Mariachi" — Los Lobos & Antonio Banderas	Runners-up
Mario & Karina	30 (10, 10, 10)	Freestyle	"It Takes Two" — Rob Base and DJ E-Z Rock	Runners-up

== Dance chart ==
The couples performed the following each week:

- Week 1: One unlearned dance (cha-cha-cha or foxtrot)
- Week 2: One unlearned dance (mambo or quickstep)
- Week 3: One unlearned dance (jive or tango)
- Week 4: One unlearned dance (paso doble or waltz)
- Week 5: One unlearned dance (rumba or samba)
- Week 6: One unlearned dance & disco group dance
- Week 7: Two unlearned dances
- Week 8: Two unlearned dances
- Week 9: One unlearned dance & redemption dance
- Week 10 (Night 1): Samba & favorite dance of the season
- Week 10 (Night 2): Freestyle

Color key:

No scores received

Dancing with the Stars (season 3) - Dance chart
Couple	Week															
Couple	1	2	3	4	5	6		7		8		9		10		
Couple	1	2	3	4	5	6		7		8		9		Night 1		Night 2
Emmitt & Cheryl	Cha-cha-cha	Quickstep	Tango	Paso doble	Samba	Jive	Group; Disco (Note: No scores were received for this dance.)	Waltz	Mambo	Foxtrot	Rumba	Waltz	Cha-cha-cha	Samba	Mambo	Freestyle
Mario & Karina	Cha-cha-cha	Quickstep	Tango	Paso doble	Rumba	Mambo	Group; Disco	Foxtrot	Jive	Waltz	Samba	Tango	Cha-cha-cha	Samba	Paso doble	Freestyle
Joey & Edyta	Cha-cha-cha	Quickstep	Jive	Waltz	Samba	Rumba	Group; Disco	Foxtrot	Mambo	Tango	Paso doble	Quickstep	Rumba			
Monique & Louis	Foxtrot	Mambo	Jive	Waltz	Rumba	Samba	Group; Disco	Quickstep	Paso doble	Tango	Cha-cha-cha					
Jerry & Kym	Cha-cha-cha	Quickstep	Tango	Waltz	Samba	Paso doble	Group; Disco	Foxtrot	Mambo							
Sara & Tony	Foxtrot	Mambo	Jive	Paso doble	Samba											
Willa & Maks	Foxtrot	Mambo	Jive	Waltz	Rumba											
Vivica & Nick	Foxtrot	Mambo	Tango	Paso doble												
Harry & Ashly	Cha-cha-cha	Quickstep	Tango													
Shanna & Jesse	Foxtrot	Mambo														
Tucker & Elena	Cha-cha-cha															
