= Witney Carson =

American dancer and choreographer (born 1993)

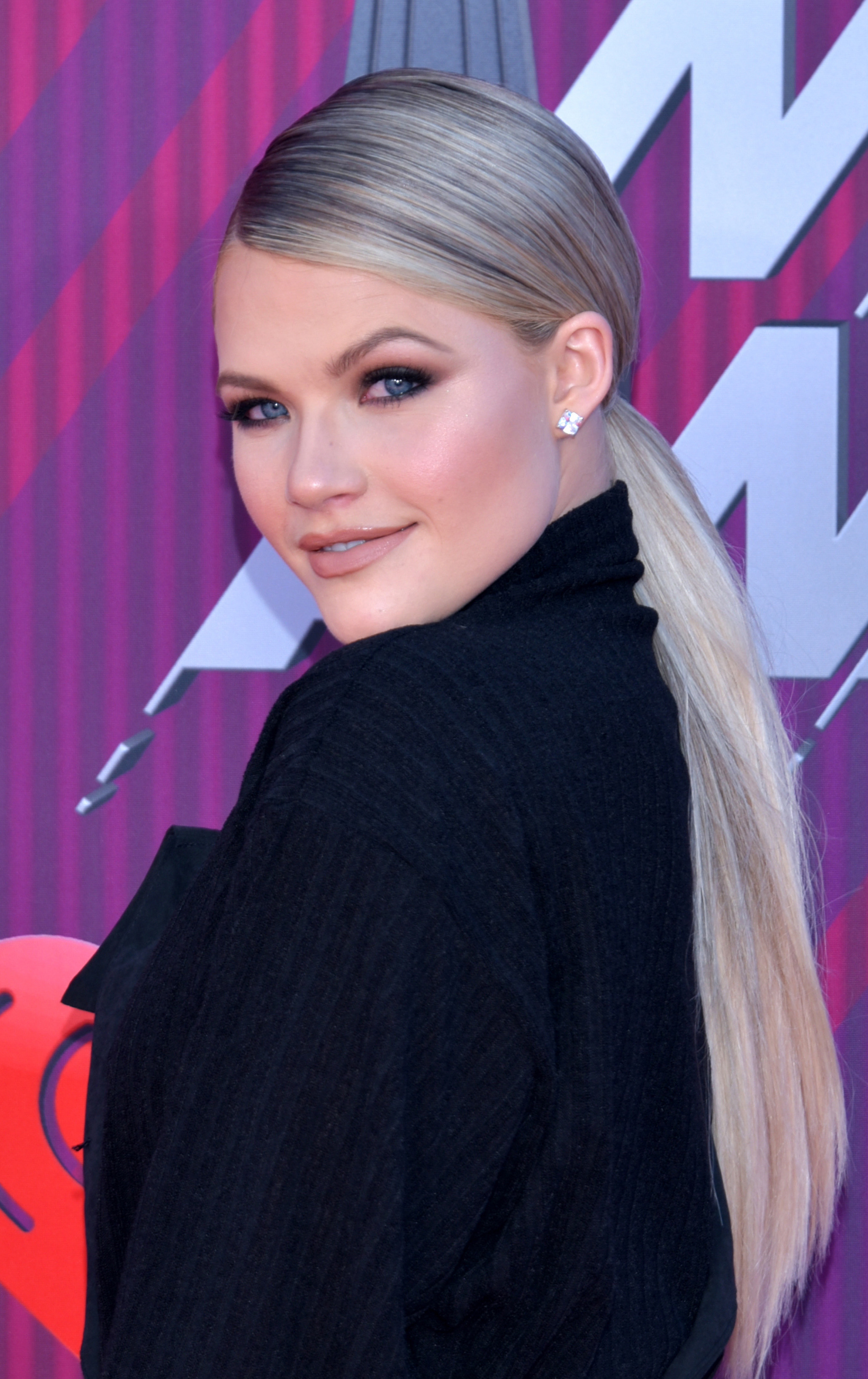
- Carson at the 2019 iHeartRadio Music Awards
- Born: Witney Capri Carson; October 17, 1993 (age 33); American Fork, Utah, U.S.
- Education: American Fork High School; Utah Valley University
- Occupations: Dancer; choreographer; television personality; actress
- Years active: 1996–present
- Spouse: Carson McAllister (m. 2015)
- Children: 2
- Website: www.witneycarson.com

Witney Capri Carson McAllister (née Carson; born October 17, 1993) is an American professional Latin and ballroom dancer and choreographer. She first gained recognition as a contestant on the ninth season of the reality competition series So You Think You Can Dance.

Carson then joined Dancing with the Stars as a troupe member, and was promoted to pro in 2014. She won the nineteenth season with actor and comedian Alfonso Ribeiro, and the thirty-fourth season with wildlife conservationist Robert Irwin. For her work on the series, Carson earned a Primetime Emmy Award nomination for Outstanding Choreography.

== Early life and education ==
Witney Capri Carson was born on October 17, 1993, in American Fork, Utah. She is the first child of Jill Carson (née Johnson), a travel agent, and Tyler Carson, a software developer. She was raised in the Church of Jesus Christ of Latter-day Saints with two younger brothers and a younger sister. Carson began her dancing career at the age of three and was trained in a variety of dance styles, such as ballet, jazz, contemporary, hip hop, lyrical, tap, Latin and standard ballroom. After graduating from American Fork High School, she briefly studied ballroom dance at Utah Valley University.

== Career ==
=== 2012–2013: So You Think You Can Dance ===
On February 23, 2012, Carson auditioned for the ninth season of the Fox competition series So You Think You Can Dance in Salt Lake City. She was one of the top twenty contestants and was paired with ballet dancer Chehon Wespi-Tschopp. As she progressed in the competition, Carson partnered with Nick Lazzarini, Stephen "tWitch" Boss, and Marko Germar. She was ultimately eliminated during the semi-finals on September 5, 2012. Carson returned the following season as an all-star and partnered with contestants Paul Karmiryan and Du-Shaunt "Fik-Shun" Stegall.

==== Results ====
Week	Pair(s) / type	Style	Music	Choreographer	Result
Meet the Top 20 (June 27)	Lindsay Arnold, Nick Bloxsom-Carter	Cha-cha-cha	"Dance Again" — Jennifer Lopez feat. Pitbull	Jason Gilkison	No elimination
Meet the Top 20 (June 27)	Top 10 Girls	Contemporary	"Where the Light Gets In" — Sennen	Travis Wall	No elimination
Meet the Top 20 (June 27)	Top 20	Contemporary	"Eyes (Coachella Live 2012 version)" — Kaskade	Mia Michaels	No elimination
Week 1 (July 11)	Group Dance	Modern	"Architect of the Mind" — Kerry Muzzey	Christopher Scott	No elimination
Week 1 (July 11)	Chehon Wespi-Tschopp	Samba	"Jump" — The Cube Guys & Luciana	Louis van Amstel	No elimination
Week 2 (July 18)	Group Dance	Jazz	"The Beautiful People (District 78 remix)" — Marilyn Manson	Nappytabs	Bottom 6
Week 2 (July 18)	Chehon Wespi-Tschopp	Bollywood	"Tandav Music" — Aatish Kapadia	Nakul Dev Mahajan	Bottom 6
Week 3 (July 25)	Group Dance	Contemporary	"The Here and After" — Jun Miyake	Tyce Diorio	Safe
Week 3 (July 25)	Chehon Wespi- Tschopp	Contemporary	"I Will Always Love You" — Whitney Houston	Stacey Tookey	Safe
Week 4 (August 15)	Group Dance	Contemporary	"Hanging On" — Active Child	Mia Michaels	Safe
Week 4 (August 15)	Chehon Wespi-Tschopp	Contemporary	"Calling You" — Celine Dion	Mia Michaels	Safe
Week 5 (August 22)	Group Dance	Broadway	"The Cool World Stomp" — Mark Isham	Tyce Diorio	Bottom 4
Week 5 (August 22)	Nick Lazzarini	Jazz	"Sing It Back" — Moloko	Travis Wall	Bottom 4
Week 5 (August 22)	Solo	Samba	"You'll Find a Way (Switch & Sinden remix)" — Santigold	—N/a	Bottom 4
Week 6 (August 29)	Group Dance	Contemporary	"Run Boy Run" — Woodkid	Peter Chao	Bottom 4
Week 6 (August 29)	Stephen "tWitch" Boss	Hip-hop	"My Homies Still" — Lil Wayne feat. Big Sean	Luther Brown	Bottom 4
Week 6 (August 29)	Solo	Cha-cha-cha	"Where Have You Been" — Rihanna	—N/a	Bottom 4
Week 7 (September 5)	Group Dance	Jazz	"Scream" — Kelis	Sonya Tayeh	Eliminated
Week 7 (September 5)	Marko Germar	Lyrical Jazz	"No Nothing" — Curtis & Reinhard feat. Blaire	Ray Leeper	Eliminated
Week 7 (September 5)	Solo	Paso doble	"Malagueña" — Brian Setzer '68 Comeback Special	—N/a	Eliminated

=== 2013–present: Dancing with the Stars and other projects ===
In March 2013, Carson joined the reality competition series Dancing with the Stars as a member of the troupe for the sixteenth season. She remained in the troupe for the following season and was promoted to pro on season 18, partnering with singer Cody Simpson. They were eliminated during the fifth week of competition on April 14, 2014, finishing in ninth place. For season 19, Carson was partnered with actor and comedian Alfonso Ribeiro. They won the competition on November 25, 2014, making Carson one of six professional dancers to win the Mirrorball Trophy within their first two seasons.

For season 20, Carson was partnered with The Bachelor star Chris Soules. They were eliminated during the eighth week of competition on May 5, 2015, alongside Robert Herjavec and Kym Johnson; the former couple finished in fifth place. Carson later starred in David Winters's musical film Dancin': It's On! opposite Gary Daniels. For season 21, Carson was paired with Big Time Rush singer and actor Carlos PenaVega. They reached the finale, but were eliminated during its first night on November 23, 2015, finishing in fourth place.

For season 22, Carson was paired with NFL linebacker Von Miller. They were eliminated during the seventh week of competition on May 2, 2016, alongside Kim Fields and Sasha Farber; the former couple finished in eighth place. For season 23, Carson was paired with rapper Vanilla Ice. They were eliminated during the fourth week of competition alongside Babyface and Allison Holker; both couples finished in tenth place. For season 24, Carson was partnered with comedian Chris Kattan. They were the first couple to be eliminated from the competition, finishing in twelfth place on March 27, 2017; Carson's lowest placement and earliest exit to date.

For season 25, Carson was partnered with Malcolm in the Middle actor Frankie Muniz. They reached the finale and ultimately finished in third place on November 21, 2017. For the Athletes season, Carson was paired with Olympic luger Chris Mazdzer. They were eliminated during the third week of competition on May 14, 2018, tying in fourth place with Jennie Finch Daigle and Mirai Nagasu and their partners Keo Motsepe and Alan Bersten. For season 27, Carson was partnered with actor Milo Manheim. They reached the finale and finished as the runner-ups on November 19, 2018, behind Bobby Bones and Sharna Burgess. For season 28, Carson was partnered with Nickelodeon actor and comedian Kel Mitchell. They also reached the finale and finished as the runner-ups on November 25, 2019, behind Hannah Brown and Alan Bersten. During the season, Carson served as the card dealer of the GSN game show Catch 21, which reunited her with Alfonso Ribeiro.

For season 30, Carson returned to the show and was partnered with WWE wrestler Mike "The Miz" Mizanin. They were eliminated during the seventh week of competition on November 1, 2021, finishing in ninth place. For season 31, Carson was partnered with comedian, actor and television personality Wayne Brady. They reached the finale and finished in third place on November 21, 2022. Carson did not return for season 32, but came back for season 33 and was partnered with NFL wide receiver Danny Amendola. They reached the finale and finished in fifth place on November 26, 2024. For season 34, Carson was partnered with wildlife conservationist and television presenter Robert Irwin. They won the competition on November 25, 2025, exactly eleven years after Carson won her first Mirrorball Trophy.

For season 35, Carson was partnered with Jimmy Kimmel Live! sidekick Guillermo Rodriguez. She was four months pregnant when she announced her return, becoming the first professional dancer to enter an installment of Dancing with the Stars while pregnant, and the first to compete that far in her second trimester. Their first dance, a cha-cha-cha to "Mr. Big Stuff" by Jean Knight, earned one of the lowest scores in the series' history. Although they earned the lowest cumulative points of the season, audience votes allowed Rodriguez and Carson to advance to the halfway point of the competition. They were eliminated on October 13, 2026, finishing in eleventh place.

==== Performances ====
* The average has been adjusted to be out of 30, not 40

Season	Partner	Place	Average
18	Cody Simpson	9th	23.80
19	Alfonso Ribeiro	1st	27.70*
20	Chris Soules	5th	22.05*
21	Carlos PenaVega	4th	26.63
22	Von Miller	7th	22.88
23	Vanilla Ice	10th	19.69*
24	Chris Kattan	12th	14.63*
25	Frankie Muniz	3rd	26.00*
26	Chris Mazdzer	4th	23.50
27	Milo Manheim	2nd	27.54
28	Kel Mitchell	2nd	25.47
30	The Miz	9th	22.69*
31	Wayne Brady	3rd	27.11*
33	Danny Amendola	5th	25.07
34	Robert Irwin	1st	26.97
35	Guillermo Rodriguez	11th	13.20

Highest and lowest scoring per dance
Dance	Partner	Highest	Partner	Lowest
Argentine tango	Robert Irwin	38	Carlos PenaVega; Milo Manheim	27
Cha-cha-cha	Alfonso Ribeiro	38	Guillermo Rodriguez	10
Contemporary	Milo Manheim	40	Von Miller	20
Foxtrot	Robert Irwin	40	Guillermo Rodriguez	15
Freestyle	Alfonso Ribeiro; Wayne Brady	40	Danny Amendola	29
Instant dance	Robert Irwin	30	Danny Amendola	24
Jazz	Alfonso Ribeiro	40	Von Miller	24
Jive	Alfonso Ribeiro	40	Danny Amendola	21
Paso doble	Robert Irwin	38	Guillermo Rodriguez	12
Quickstep	Carlos PenaVega	39	Frankie Muniz	24
Rumba	Carlos PenaVega	38	Kel Mitchell	20
Salsa	Alfonso Ribeiro	39	Chris Mazdzer	21
Samba	Wayne Brady	40	Guillermo Rodriguez	13
Tango	Wayne Brady	33	Kel Mitchell	16
Trio dance	Alfonso Ribeiro (with Lindsay Arnold)	40	Frankie Muniz (with Alfonso Ribeiro); Milo Manheim (with Riker Lynch)	29
Viennese waltz	Kel Mitchell	40	Vanilla Ice	23

Season 18 with celebrity partner Cody Simpson

Week	Dance	Music	Judges' scores (Note: Individual judges' scores are listed in the following order: Carrie Ann Inaba, Len Goodman, Bruno Tonioli.)			Total score	Result
1	Cha-cha-cha	"Timber" — Pitbull feat. Kesha	7	7	8	22	Safe
2	Tango	"Yeah 3x" — Chris Brown	7	7	8	22	Safe (Note: Cody and Witney were the last couple to be called safe.)
3	Jazz	"Surfboard" — Cody Simpson	9	8	9	35 (Note: Cody and Witney also received a score of 9 from guest judge Robin Roberts.)	Safe
4 (Note: This was Switch-Up Week, so Cody performed with Sharna Burgess and Witney performed with Drew Carey.)	Foxtrot	"I'm Yours" — Jason Mraz	8	7	8	31 (Note: Cody and Sharna also received a score of 8 from guest judge Julianne Hough.)	Safe
5	Samba	"I Just Can't Wait to Be King" (from The Lion King)	9	8	9	34 (Note: Cody and Witney also received a score of 8 from guest judge Donny Osmond.)	Eliminated

Notes

Season 19 with celebrity partner Alfonso Ribeiro

Week	Dance	Music	Judges' scores (Note: Individual judges' scores are listed in the following order: Carrie Ann Inaba, Len Goodman, Julianne Hough, Bruno Tonioli.)				Total score	Result
1	Jive	"3-6-9" — Cupid feat. B.o.B	9	9	9	9	36	Safe
2	Samba	"Gettin' Jiggy wit It" — Will Smith	8	8	8	8	32	Safe
3	Quickstep	"Hey Goldmember" (from Austin Powers in Goldmember)	8	8 (Note: This score was given by guest judge Kevin Hart in place of Goodman.)	8	8	32	Safe
4	Jazz	"It's Not Unusual" — Tom Jones	10	10 (Note: This score was given by the general public in place of Goodman, with an averaged score counting alongside the scores given by the three judges.)	10	10	40	Safe
5 (Note: This was Switch-Up Week, so Alfonso performed with Cheryl Burke and Witney performed with Michael Waltrip.)	Flamenco	"Angelica" — Hans Zimmer	8	9 (Note: This score was given by guest judge Jessie J in place of Goodman.)	9	8	34	Safe
6	Salsa	"Booty" — Jennifer Lopez feat. Pitbull	10	10 (Note: This score was given by guest judge Pitbull in place of Goodman.)	9	10	39	Safe
7	Rumba	"Ghost" — Ella Henderson	9	9	9	9	68	Safe
7	Freestyle (Team "Creepy")	"Time Warp" (from Glee)	8	8	8	8	68	Safe
8	Cha-cha-cha	"Trust" — Prince	10	9	9	10	38	Safe
8	Jive (Dance-off)	"Rip It Up" — Little Richard	Winner				3 (Note: Alfonso and Witney received three bonus points for winning this dance-off.)	Safe
9	Foxtrot	"Ain't That a Kick in the Head?" — Robbie Williams	9	9	9	10	77	Safe
9	Paso doble (Trio dance) (Note: For this trio dance, Alfonso and Witney performed with Lindsay Arnold.)	"Turn Down for What" — DJ Snake & Lil Jon	10	10	10	10	77	Safe
10 (Semifinals)	Argentine tango	"Love Runs Out" — OneRepublic	9	9	9	9	75	Safe
10 (Semifinals)	Contemporary	"Love Runs Out" — OneRepublic	10	9	10	10	75	Safe
11 (Finals)	Jive	"3-6-9" — Cupid feat. B.o.B	10	10	10	10	120	Winners
11 (Finals)	Freestyle	"Sing, Sing, Sing (With a Swing)" — Benny Goodman "Apache" — The Sugarhill Gang	10	10	10	10	120	Winners
11 (Finals)	Argentine tango & Cha-cha-cha (Fusion dance)	"Shut Up and Dance" — Walk the Moon	10	10	10	10	120	Winners

Notes

Season 20 with celebrity partner Chris Soules

Week	Dance	Music	Judges' scores (Note: Individual judges' scores are listed in the following order: Carrie Ann Inaba, Len Goodman, Julianne Hough, Bruno Tonioli.)				Total score	Result
1	Jive	"Footloose" — Kenny Loggins	7	6	6	7	26	Safe
2	Cha-cha-cha	"Time of Our Lives" ― Pitbull & Ne-Yo	5	6	5	5	21	Safe
3	Argentine tango	"Dangerous" — David Guetta feat. Sam Martin	7	7	7	7	28	Safe (Note: Chris and Witney were the last couple to be called safe.)
4	Rumba	"The Book of Love" — Gavin James	7	6	7	7	27	Safe
5	Quickstep	"Zero to Hero" (from Hercules)	7	6	7	7	27	Safe
6	Viennese waltz	"Hopelessly Devoted to You" — Olivia Newton-John	8	7	8	8	31	Safe
6	Freestyle (Team Trouble)	"Trouble" — Iggy Azalea feat. Jennifer Hudson	10	9	10	10	39	Safe
7	Foxtrot	"Five Minutes More" — Frank Sinatra	8	7	8	8	31	Safe
7	Foxtrot (Dance-off)	"Orange Colored Sky" — Nat King Cole	Loser				0 (Note: Chris and Witney received zero bonus points for losing this dance-off.)	Safe
8	Contemporary	"Lay Me Down" — Sam Smith	9	8	9	8	34	Eliminated
8	Paso doble (Trio dance) (Note: For this trio dance, Chris and Witney performed with Lindsay Arnold.)	"Outside" — Calvin Harris feat. Ellie Goulding	7	7	8	8	30	Eliminated

Notes

Season 21 with celebrity partner Carlos PenaVega

Week	Dance	Music	Judges' scores (Note: Individual judges' scores are listed in the following order: Carrie Ann Inaba, Julianne Hough, Bruno Tonioli.)			Total score	Result
1	Jive	"I Got You (I Feel Good)" — James Brown	8	8	7	23	Safe
2	Foxtrot	"Home" — Blake Shelton	8	8	8	24	Safe
2	Cha-cha-cha	"Hound Dog" — Big Mama Thornton	7	7	7	21	Safe
3	Jazz	"Thank You for Being a Friend" (from The Golden Girls)	7	8	8	31 (Note: Carlos and Witney also received a score of 8 from guest judge Alfonso Ribeiro.)	Safe
4	Waltz	"Amazing Grace" — Ray Chew	9	8	8	25	Safe (Note: Carlos and Witney were the last couple to be called safe.)
5 (Note: This was Switch-Up Week, so Carlos performed with Lindsay Arnold and Witney performed with Nick Carter.)	Quickstep	"Bossa Nova Baby" — Elvis Presley	10	10	10	39 (Note: Carlos and Lindsay also received a score of 9 from guest judge Maksim Chmerkovskiy.)	Safe
6	Rumba	"Pony" — Ginuwine	10	9	10	38 (Note: Carlos and Witney also received a score of 9 from guest judge Olivia Newton-John.)	Safe
7	Paso doble	"O Fortuna" — Carl Orff	9	10	9	28	Safe
7	Freestyle (Team Who You Gonna Call?)	"Ghostbusters" — Ray Parker Jr.	9	10	9	28	Safe
8	Salsa	Valió la Pena" — Marc Anthony	9	9	9	27	Safe
8	Jive (Dance-off)	"Travelin' Band" — Creedence Clearwater Revival	Winner			2 (Note: Carlos and Witney received two bonus points for winning this dance-off. They received votes from all three judges.)	Safe
9	Argentine tango	"What Do You Mean?" — Justin Bieber	9	9	9	27	Safe
9	Paso doble (Team-up) (Note: For this team-up dance, Carlos and Witney performed with Alek Skarlatos and Lindsay Arnold.)	"We Will Rock You" — Queen (from We Will Rock You)	8	8	8	24	Safe
10 (Semifinals)	Contemporary	"Drag Me Down" — One Direction	9	9	10	28	Safe (Note: Tamar Braxton unexpectedly withdrew from the competition, all the remaining couples directly advanced to the finale.)
10 (Semifinals)	Cha-cha-cha (Dance-off)	"Fun" — Pitbull feat. Chris Brown	Winner			3 (Note: Carlos and Witney received three bonus points for winning this dance-off.)	Safe
10 (Semifinals)	Charleston (Trio dance) (Note: For this trio dance, Carlos and Witney performed with Karina Smirnoff.)	"Booty Swing" — Parov Stelar	9	10	10	29	Safe
11 (Finals)	Foxtrot	"The Hills" — The Weeknd	10	10	10	30	Eliminated
11 (Finals)	Freestyle	"WTF (Where They From)" — Missy Elliott feat. Pharrell Williams	10	10	10	30	Eliminated

Notes

Season 22 with celebrity partner Von Miller

Week	Dance	Music	Judges' scores (Note: Individual judges' scores are listed in the following order: Carrie Ann Inaba, Len Goodman, Bruno Tonioli.)			Total score	Result
1	Foxtrot	"My House" — Flo Rida	8	6	7	21	Safe
2	Cha-cha-cha	"Ain't Too Cool" — LunchMoney Lewis	7	6	7	20	Safe
3	Contemporary	"In the Air Tonight" — Phil Collins	7	6	7	20	Safe
4	Viennese waltz	"A Dream Is a Wish Your Heart Makes" (from Cinderella)	8	8	8	32 (Note: Von and Witney also received a score of 8 from guest judge Zendaya.)	Safe
5 (Note: This was Switch-Up Night, so Von performed with Lindsay Arnold and Witney performed with Wanyá Morris.)	Jive	"Hips" — Beans & Fatback	8	7	7	29 (Note: Von and Lindsay also received a score of 7 from guest judge Maksim Chmerkovskiy.)	Safe
6	Jazz	"Bad" — Michael Jackson	8	8	8	24	Safe (Note: Von and Witney were the last couple to be called safe.)
7	Salsa	"A Little Less Conversation" — Elvis Presley	8	8	8	24	Eliminated
7	Freestyle (Team James Brown)	"Super Bad", "Living in America" & "I Got You (I Feel Good)"; All by James Brown	9	9	10	28	Eliminated

Notes

Season 23 with celebrity partner Vanilla Ice

Week	Dance	Music	Judges' scores (Note: Individual judges' scores are listed in the following order: Carrie Ann Inaba, Len Goodman, Julianne Hough, Bruno Tonioli.)				Total score	Result
1	Cha-cha-cha	"Ice Ice Baby" — Vanilla Ice	7	5	6	7	25	Safe
2	Foxtrot	"Love and Marriage" (from Married... with Children)	6	7	6	7	26	Safe
3	Paso doble	"Save Tonight" — Zayde Wølf	6	6	5	6	23	Immunity (Note: Vanilla Ice and Witney were immune from elimination for winning their face-off.)
4	Viennese waltz	"La Nouba" — Benoît Jutras	8	—N/a	7	8	23 (Note: Len Goodman was absent for this episode.)	Eliminated

Notes

Season 24 with celebrity partner Chris Kattan

Week	Dance	Music	Judges' scores (Note: Individual judges' scores are listed in the following order: Carrie Ann Inaba, Len Goodman, Julianne Hough, Bruno Tonioli.)				Total score	Result
1	Cha-cha-cha	"What Is Love" — Haddaway	5	4	4	4	17	Safe
2	Jazz	"Hey Ya!" — OutKast	6	5	6	5	22	Eliminated

Notes

Season 25 with celebrity partner Frankie Muniz

Week	Dance	Music	Judges' scores (Note: Individual judges' scores are listed in the following order: Carrie Ann Inaba, Len Goodman, Bruno Tonioli.)			Total score	Result
1	Foxtrot	"Sign of the Times" — Harry Styles	7	6	6	19	Safe
2	Tango	"Whatever It Takes" — Imagine Dragons	8	7	8	23	Safe
2	Cha-cha-cha	"Perm" — Bruno Mars	8	8	9	25	Safe
3	Samba	"It's Gonna Be Me" — NSYNC	7	7	7	21	Safe
4	Quickstep	"Adventure of a Lifetime" — Coldplay	8	8	8	24	Safe
5	Argentine tango	"Angelica" (from Pirates of the Caribbean: On Stranger Tides)	10	9	10	29	Safe (Note: Frankie and Witney were the last couple to be called safe.)
6	Jazz	"Holly Rock" — Sheila E.	7	8	8	31 (Note: Frankie and Witney also received a score of 8 from guest judge Shania Twain.)	Safe
7	Contemporary	"Every Breath You Take" — Chase Holfelder	10	10	10	30	Safe
7	Freestyle (Team Phantom of the Ballroom)	"The Phantom of the Opera" — Sarah Brightman & Michael Crawford	10	10	10	30	Safe
8 (Quarterfinals)	Viennese waltz	"Perfect" — Ed Sheeran	9	8	9	26	Safe
8 (Quarterfinals)	Jive (Trio dance) (Note: For this trio dance, Frankie and Witney performed with Alfonso Ribeiro.)	"Good Place" — Leo Soul	9	9	9	27	Safe
9 (Semifinals)	Salsa	"Shake" — Yin Yang Twins feat. Pitbull	8	8	9	25	Safe
9 (Semifinals)	Paso doble	"Carnaval de Paris" — Dario G	9	8	9	26	Safe
10 (Finals)	Foxtrot	"I Won't Dance" — Frank Sinatra	10	9	10	39 (Note: Frankie and Witney also received a score of 10 from guest judge Julianne Hough.)	Third place
10 (Finals)	Freestyle	"Run Boy Run" — Woodkid	9	9	10	38	Third place
10 (Finals)	Argentine tango	"Angelica" (from Pirates of the Caribbean: On Stranger Tides)	10	10	10	30	Third place
10 (Finals)	Foxtrot and Tango (Fusion dance)	"Without You" — Avicii feat. Sandro Cavazza	10	9	9	28	Third place

Notes

Season 26 with celebrity partner Chris Mazdzer

Week	Dance	Music	Judges' scores (Note: Individual judges' scores are listed in the following order: Carrie Ann Inaba, Len Goodman, Bruno Tonioli.)			Total score	Result
1	Salsa	"Mr. Put It Down" — Ricky Martin feat. Pitbull	7	7	7	21	Safe
2	Viennese waltz	"Next to Me" — Imagine Dragons	9	8	8	33 (Note: Chris and Witney also received a score of 8 from guest judge Rashad Jennings.)	Safe (Note: Chris and Witney were the last couple to be called safe.)
2	Freestyle (Team 1950s Tennis)	"...Baby One More Time" — The Baseballs	8	8	8	37	Safe
3 (Semifinals)	Foxtrot	"I Got Rhythm" — Ray Chew	8	7	9	33 (Note: Chris and Witney also received a score of 9 from guest judge David Ross.)	Eliminated
3 (Semifinals)	Salsa (Dance-off)	"WTF (Where They From)" — Missy Elliott feat. Pharrell Williams	Loser			0 (Note: Chris and Witney received zero bonus points for losing this dance-off. They received a vote from Carrie Ann Inaba, plus the public vote (55%).)	Eliminated

Notes

Season 27 with celebrity partner Milo Manheim

Week	Dance	Music	Judges' scores (Note: Individual judges' scores are listed in the following order: Carrie Ann Inaba, Len Goodman, Bruno Tonioli.)			Total score	Result
1	Cha-cha-cha	"Free Free Free" — Pitbull feat. Theron Theron	7	6	7	20	Safe
2	Charleston	"Living in New York City" — Robin Thicke	9	8	9	26	Safe
2	Tango	"Ashes" — Celine Dion	9	8	9	26	Safe
3	Jive	"Can You Do This" — Aloe Blacc	9	9	9	27	Safe
4	Salsa (Trio dance) (Note: For this trio dance, Milo and Witney performed with Riker Lynch.)	"Adrenalina" — Wisin, feat. Ricky Martin & Jennifer Lopez	10	9	10	29	Safe
5	Quickstep	"Incredits 2" (from Incredibles 2)	9	8	10	27	Safe
6	Contemporary	"Toxic" — 2WEI	10	10	10	30	Safe
7	Foxtrot	"Born to Love You" — LANCO	10	9	10	29	Safe
7	Freestyle (Team HayNow)	"9 to 5" — Dolly Parton	10	9	10	29	Safe
8 (Semifinals)	Argentine tango	"Pray for Me" — The Weeknd & Kendrick Lamar	9	9	9	27	Safe
8 (Semifinals)	Cha-cha-cha	"Good Feeling" — Austin French	9	9	10	28	Safe
9 (Finals)	Charleston	"Living in New York City" — Robin Thicke	10	10	10	30	Runners-up
9 (Finals)	Freestyle	"Ain't No Sunshine" (Lido remix) — Bill Withers	10	10	10	30	Runners-up

Notes

Season 28 with celebrity partner Kel Mitchell

Week	Dance	Music	Judges' scores (Note: Individual judges' scores are listed in the following order: Carrie Ann Inaba, Len Goodman, Bruno Tonioli.)			Total score	Result
1	Tango	"Sucker" — Jonas Brothers	6	5	5	16	Safe
2	Samba	"Every Little Step" — Bobby Brown	7	6	7	20	Safe
3	Rumba	"My Heart Will Go On" (from Titanic)	7	6	7	20	Bottom two
4	Cha-cha-cha	"If I Can't Have You" — Shawn Mendes	8	8	8	32 (Note: Kel and Witney also received a score of 8 from guest judge Leah Remini.)	Safe
5	Jazz	"We're All in This Together" (from High School Musical)	9	8	9	26	Safe
6	Quickstep	"Part-Time Lover" — Stevie Wonder	9	8	9	26	Safe
7	Jive	"Time Warp" (from The Rocky Horror Picture Show)	9	9	9	27	Safe
7	Freestyle (Team Treat)	"Sweet Dreams" — Beyoncé	8	8	8	24	Safe
8	Salsa	"This Is How We Do It" — Montell Jordan	9	9	10	28	Safe
8	Jive (Dance-off)	"Don't Stop Me Now" — Queen	Winner			2 (Note: Kel and Witney received two bonus points for winning this dance-off.)	Safe
9	Paso doble	"Free Your Mind" — En Vogue	8	8	8	34 (Note: Kel and Witney also received a score of 9 from guest judge Joey Fatone.)	Safe
9	Viennese waltz	"I'll Make Love to You" — Boyz II Men	10	10	10	40 (Note: Kel and Witney also received a score of 10 from guest judge Joey Fatone.)	Safe
10 (Semifinals)	Tango	"Get Ready" — The Temptations	9	9	9	27	Safe
10 (Semifinals)	Contemporary	"I Will Always Love You" — Whitney Houston	10	10	10	30	Safe
11 (Finals)	Jazz	"We're All in This Together" (from High School Musical)	10	10	10	30	Runners-up
11 (Finals)	Freestyle	"Jump" — Kris Kross	10	9	10	29	Runners-up

Notes

Season 30 with celebrity partner Mike "The Miz" Mizanin

Week	Dance	Music	Judges' scores (Note: Individual judges' scores are listed in the following order: Carrie Ann Inaba, Len Goodman, Derek Hough, Bruno Tonioli.)				Total score	Result
1	Cha-cha-cha	"Butter" — BTS	6	6	6	6	24	Safe
2	Tango	"Nothin' but a Good Time" — Poison	7	5	7	7	26	Safe
3	Salsa	"Oops!... I Did It Again"	7	7	—N/a (Note: Derek Hough missed this episode due to a possible exposure to COVID-19.)	8	22	Safe
4	Quickstep	"Friend Like Me" (from Aladdin)	8	7	8	8	31	Safe
4	Argentine tango	"Be Prepared" (from The Lion King)	9	8	9	8	34	Safe
5	Jive	"Greased Lightnin'" — John Travolta & Jeff Conaway	8	8	8	8	32	Safe
6	Paso doble	"Wicked Games" — RAIGN (inspired by Hellraiser)	9	8	9	8	34	Safe
7	Foxtrot	"Radio Ga Ga" — Queen	8	8	8	8	32	Eliminated
7	Jive (Dance-off)	"Crazy Little Thing Called Love" — Queen	Loser				0 (Note: The Miz and Witney received zero bonus points for losing this dance-off.)	Eliminated

Notes

Season 31 with celebrity partner Wayne Brady

Week	Dance	Music	Judges' scores (Note: Individual judges' scores are listed in the following order: Carrie Ann Inaba, Len Goodman, Derek Hough, Bruno Tonioli.)				Total score	Result
1	Cha-cha-cha	"She's a Bad Mama Jama (She's Built, She's Stacked)" — Carl Carlton	7	7	7	7	28	Safe
2	Jive	"Burning Love" — Elvis Presley	8	8	8	8	32	Safe
3	Tango	"The Name's Bond... James Bond" (from Casino Royale)	8	8	8	9	33	Safe
4	Jazz	"Wait for It" (from Hamilton)	9	9	9	9	36	Safe
5	Foxtrot	"Beautiful" — Jim Brickman & Wayne Brady	9	9	9	10	37	Safe
5	Samba	"It Takes Two" — Rob Base & DJ E-Z Rock	10	10	10	10	40	Safe
5	Hustle & Lindy Hop Marathon	"Hot Stuff" — Donna Summer & "Jump, Jive an' Wail" — The Brian Setzer Orchestra	—N/a				5 (Note: Wayne and Witney received five bonus points in this dance marathon.)	Safe
6	Quickstep	"I Get a Kick Out of You" — Michael Bublé	8	9	8	9	44 (Note: Wayne and Witney also received a score of 10 from guest judge Michael Bublé.)	Safe
7	Contemporary	"Halloween Theme" — District 78	9	9	9	10	37	Safe
7	Freestyle (Team Scream)	"Heads Will Roll" — Yeah Yeah Yeahs	10	9	10	10	39	Safe
8	Salsa	"Motownphilly" — Boyz II Men	10	10	10	10	40	Safe
8	Samba (Relay)	"Shoop" — Salt-N-Pepa	Winner				5 (Note: Wayne and Witney received five bonus points from Bruno Tonioli for winning this dance relay.)	Safe
9 (Semifinals)	Paso doble	"Beggin'" — Måneskin	9	9	9	9	36	Safe
9 (Semifinals)	Viennese waltz	"It's a Man's Man's Man's World" — James Brown	10	9	9	9	37	Safe
10 (Finals)	Quickstep (Redemption Dance)	"(Your Love Keeps Lifting Me) Higher and Higher" — Jackie Wilson	9	9	9	9	36	Third place
10 (Finals)	Freestyle	"Get Up" — Ciara, feat. Chamillionaire & "24K Magic" — Bruno Mars	10	10	10	10	40	Third place

Notes

Season 33 with celebrity partner Danny Amendola

Week	Dance	Music	Judges' scores (Note: Individual judges' scores are listed in the following order: Carrie Ann Inaba, Derek Hough, Bruno Tonioli.)			Total score	Result
1	Tango	"A Bar Song (Tipsy)" — Shaboozey & David Guetta	7	6	7	20	Safe
2	Jive	"Danger Zone" (from Top Gun)	7	7	7	21	Safe
3	Foxtrot	"Dancing Machine" — The Jackson 5	8	7	7	30 (Note: Danny and Witney also received a score of 8 from guest judge Rosie Perez.)	Safe
3	Paso doble	"Livin' on a Prayer" — Bon Jovi	7	7	7	30 (Note: Danny and Witney also received a score of 9 from guest judge Gene Simmons.)	Safe
4	Contemporary	"Unsteady (Erich Lee Gravity Remix)" — X Ambassadors	9	9	9	36 (Note: Danny and Witney also received a score of 9 from guest judge Mark Ballas.)	Safe
5	Jazz	"Bye Bye Bye"(from Deadpool & Wolverine)	9	9	9	51	Safe
5	Freestyle (Team Roar)	"I Just Can't Wait to Be King" (from The Lion King)	8	8	8	51	Safe
6	Argentine tango	"Poison" — RAVN	10	9	9	28	Safe
6	Jive (Dance-off)	"Time Warp" — Little Nell, Patricia Quinn & Richard O'Brien	Loser			0 (Note: Danny and Witney received zero bonus points for losing this dance-off.)	Safe
7 (Quarterfinals)	Quickstep	"Hey Pachuco" — Royal Crown Revue	9	9	9	51	Safe
7 (Quarterfinals)	Jive (Instant Dance)	"Good Golly, Miss Molly" — Little Richard	8	8	8	51	Safe
8 (Semifinals)	Viennese waltz	"Gravity" — John Mayer	9	9	9	54	Safe
8 (Semifinals)	Salsa	"I Like It" — Cardi B, Bad Bunny & J Balvin	9	9	9	54	Safe
9 (Finals)	Tango (Redemption Dance)	"I Had Some Help" — Post Malone feat. Morgan Wallen	9	9	9	56	Fifth place
9 (Finals)	Freestyle	"Pink" — Lizzo & "I'm Just Ken" — Ryan Gosling	9	10	10	56	Fifth place

Notes

Season 34 with celebrity partner Robert Irwin

Week	Dance	Music	Judges' scores (Note: Individual judges' scores are listed in the following order: Carrie Ann Inaba, Derek Hough, Bruno Tonioli.)			Total score	Result
1	Jive	"Born to be Wild" — Steppenwolf	—N/a (Note: Robert and Witney only received two judges's scores, as Carrie Ann Inaba was absent.)	8	7	15	Safe
2	Tango	"Move Your Feet" — Junior Senior	8	7	7	22	Safe
3	Salsa	"Million Dollar Baby" — Tommy Richman	8	7	7	22	Safe
4	Cha-cha-cha	"Try Everything" (from Zootopia)	7	7	8	22	Safe
5	Contemporary	"You'll Be in My Heart" — Phil Collins	8	9	9	35 (Note: Robert and Witney also received a score of 9 from guest judge Kym Johnson.)	Safe
6	Jazz	"Dancing Through Life" — Jonathan Bailey feat. Ariana Grande, Ethan Slater, Marissa Bode and Cynthia Erivo	9	9	9	36 (Note: Robert and Witney also received a score of 9 from guest judge Jon M. Chu.)	Safe
7	Argentine tango	"Sweet Dreams (Are Made of This)" — Hampton String Quartet	10	9	10	38 (Note: Robert and Witney also received a score of 9 from guest judge Cheryl Burke.)	Safe
7	Hustle & Lindy Hop; Marathon	"Murder on the Dancefloor" — Sophie Ellis-Bextor & "A Little Party Never Killed Nobody (All We Got)" — Fergie, Q-Tip, & GoonRock	—N/a			3 (Note: Robert and Witney received three bonus points in this dance marathon.)	Safe
8	Paso doble	"Icky Thump" — The White Stripes	9	9	10	38 (Note: Robert and Witney also received a score of 10 from guest judge Flavor Flav.)	Safe
8	Freestyle (Team Kool)	"Celebration" — Kool & the Gang	9	10	9	38 (Note: Team Kool also received a score of 10 from guest judge Flavor Flav.)	Safe
9 (Quarterfinals)	Foxtrot	"Footprints in the Sand" — Leona Lewis	10	10	10	40 (Note: Robert and Witney also received a score of 10 from guest judge Tom Bergeron.)	Safe
9 (Quarterfinals)	Jive (Dance relay)	"Dance with Me Tonight" — Olly Murs	Winners			2 (Note: Robert received two bonus points for winning this dance relay with celebrity partner Xochitl Gomez.)	Safe
10 (Semifinals)	Jive	"Baby I'm a Star" — Prince	10	10	10	30	Safe
10 (Semifinals)	Viennese waltz	"WOW" — Prince	10	9	10	29	Safe
11 (Finals)	Quickstep	"Are You Gonna Be My Girl" — Jet	9	10	10	29	Winners
11 (Finals)	Cha-cha-cha (Instant dance)	"Cake by the Ocean" — DNCE	10	10	10	30	Winners
11 (Finals)	Freestyle	"Black and Gold" — Sam Sparro & "The Nights" — Avicii	10	10	10	30	Winners

Notes

Season 35 with celebrity partner Guillermo Rodriguez

Week	Dance	Music	Judges' scores (Note: Individual judges' scores are listed in the following order: Carrie Ann Inaba, Derek Hough, Bruno Tonioli.)			Total score	Result
1	Cha-cha-cha	"Mr. Big Stuff" — Jean Knight	4	3	3	10	Safe
2	Paso doble	"Where Have You Been" — Rihanna	4	4	4	12	Safe
3	Foxtrot	"Escape (The Piña Colada Song)" — Rupert Holmes	5	5	5	15	Safe
4	Samba	"Obsessed" — Mariah Carey	4	4	5	13	Safe
5	Salsa	"Tití Me Preguntó" — Bad Bunny	6	5	5	22 (Note: Guillermo and Witney also received a score of 6 from guest judge Joe Buck.)	Eliminated

== Personal life ==
Carson is a member of the Church of Jesus Christ of Latter-day Saints. She was diagnosed with melanoma before her debut appearance of Dancing with the Stars. She underwent two successful surgeries to remove the cancer and hid her diagnosis from the producers, due to fear that it would cost her the season.

On October 3, 2015, Carson announced her engagement to mechanical engineer Carson McAllister, her high school sweetheart, after four years of dating. They were married on December 31, 2015, through a civil ceremony in Salt Lake City, and held a religious ceremony the following day at the Salt Lake Temple. Carson and McAllister have two sons together, and are currently expecting their third son. The family resides in Orlando, Florida.

== Accolades ==
Award	Year (Note: Indicates the year of ceremony. Each year is linked to the article about the awards held that year, wherever possible.)	Recipient(s)	Category	Result	Ref.
Primetime Creative Arts Emmy Awards	2015	Carson	Outstanding Choreography (for "369", "It's Not Unusual" and "Sing with a Swing-Apache")	Nominated	

Awards and achievements
Preceded by Meryl Davis & Maksim Chmerkovskiy; Joey Graziadei & Jenna Johnson	Dancing with the Stars (US) winner Season 19 (Fall 2014 with Alfonso Ribeiro); Season 34 (Fall 2025 with Robert Irwin)	Succeeded by Rumer Willis & Valentin Chmerkovskiy; TBD
Preceded by Josh Norman & Sharna Burgess	Dancing with the Stars (US) runner-up Season 27 (Fall 2018 with Milo Manheim); Season 28 (Fall 2019 with Kel Mitchell)	Succeeded by Nev Schulman & Jenna Johnson
Preceded by Normani Kordei & Valentin Chmerkovskiy; Cody Rigsby & Cheryl Burke	Dancing with the Stars (US) third place contestant Season 25 (Fall 2017 with Frankie Muniz); Season 31 (Fall 2022 with Wayne Brady)	Succeeded by Tonya Harding & Sasha Farber; Ariana Madix & Pasha Pashkov
Preceded by Alyson Hannigan & Sasha Farber	Dancing with the Stars (US) fifth place contestant Season 33 (Fall 2024 with Danny Amendola)	Succeeded by Elaine Hendrix & Alan Bersten
