= Dancing with the Stars (American TV series) season 19 =

Dancing with the Stars
- Season 19
- Promotional poster, featuring former pro dancers Kym Johnson and Tristan MacManus
- Hosted by: Tom Bergeron; Erin Andrews
- Judges: Carrie Ann Inaba; Len Goodman; Bruno Tonioli; Julianne Hough
- Celebrity winner: Alfonso Ribeiro
- Professional winner: Witney Carson
- No. of episodes: 15

Release
- Original network: ABC
- Original release: September 15 – November 25, 2014

Season chronology
- ← Previous; Season 18 Next → Season 20

Season nineteen of Dancing with the Stars premiered on September 15, 2014.

On November 25, actor Alfonso Ribeiro and Witney Carson were crowned the champions, while Duck Dynasty star Sadie Robertson and Mark Ballas finished in second place, and Pretty Little Liars actress Janel Parrish and Valentin Chmerkovskiy finished in third.

Cheryl Burke, who was featured on every season of the show except the first, decided to leave when her contract expired at the end of this season. She would later return in season 23.

== Cast ==
=== Couples ===
This season featured thirteen celebrity contestants. Twelve professional partners were revealed on August 13, 2014, on Good Morning America by Cheryl Burke, Tony Dovolani, Karina Smirnoff, and Valentin Chmerkovskiy. Sharna Burgess was announced as the thirteenth pro on August 27, 2014. The celebrity partners were revealed on Good Morning America on September 4, 2014.

Henry Byalikov returned to the show's dance troupe alongside Lindsay Arnold, Sasha Farber, Gleb Savchenko, and Jenna Johnson. Allison Holker, a contestant on season two of So You Think You Can Dance and a nominee for a Primetime Emmy Award for Outstanding Choreography in 2013, made her debut as a professional this season, along with season 18 troupe member and former Strictly Come Dancing champion pro Artem Chigvintsev and South African Latin American ballroom champion Keo Motsepe.

Celebrity	Notability	Professional partner	Status	Ref.
Lolo Jones	Olympic athlete	Keo Motsepe	Eliminated 1st on September 16, 2014	
Tavis Smiley	Television & radio broadcaster	Sharna Burgess	Eliminated 2nd on September 23, 2014	
Randy Couture	UFC mixed martial artist	Karina Smirnoff	Eliminated 3rd on September 29, 2014	
Betsey Johnson	Fashion designer	Tony Dovolani	Eliminated 4th on October 6, 2014	
Jonathan Bennett	Mean Girls actor	Allison Holker; Peta Murgatroyd (Week 5)	Eliminated 5th on October 20, 2014	
Antonio Sabàto Jr.	General Hospital actor & model	Cheryl Burke; Allison Holker (Week 5)	Eliminated 6th on October 27, 2014	
Michael Waltrip	NASCAR racer	Emma Slater; Witney Carson (Week 5)	Eliminated 7th on November 3, 2014	
Lea Thompson	Film & television actress	Artem Chigvintsev; Valentin Chmerkovskiy (Week 5)	Eliminated 8th on November 10, 2014	
Tommy Chong	Comedian & actor	Peta Murgatroyd; Emma Slater (Week 5)	Eliminated 9th on November 17, 2014	
Bethany Mota	YouTube personality	Derek Hough; Mark Ballas (Week 5)	Eliminated 10th on November 24, 2014	
Janel Parrish	Pretty Little Liars actress	Valentin Chmerkovskiy; Artem Chigvintsev (Week 5)	Third place on November 25, 2014	
Sadie Robertson	Duck Dynasty cast member	Mark Ballas; Derek Hough (Week 5)	Runners-up on November 25, 2014	
Alfonso Ribeiro	Television actor	Witney Carson; Cheryl Burke (Week 5)	Winners on November 25, 2014	

=== Host and judges ===
Tom Bergeron returned as host alongside Erin Andrews. Len Goodman, Carrie Ann Inaba, and Bruno Tonioli all returned as judges, while former professional and two-time champion Julianne Hough joined the panel as a permanent fourth judge. Ray Chew also returned as bandleader. Leah Remini filled in as co-host on October 20, due to Erin Andrews' commitment with Fox to cover the 2014 World Series. Comedian and actor Kevin Hart filled in as a celebrity guest judge on September 29. On October 13, singer Jessie J was a guest judge, and on October 20, rapper Pitbull was also a guest judge.

== Episodes ==
No. overall	No. in season	Title	Rating (18–49)	Original release date	U.S. viewers (millions)
331	1	"Premiere Night"	2.40	September 15, 2014	13.64
332	2	"Premiere Night: Results"	2.20	September 16, 2014	12.68
333	3	"My Jam Monday"	2.00	September 22, 2014	12.13
334	4	"My Jam Monday: Results"	1.60	September 23, 2014	9.68
335	5	"Movie Night"	1.84	September 29, 2014	12.50
336	6	"Most Memorable Year"	1.80	October 6, 2014	12.32
337	7	"Switch-Up Night"	1.98	October 13, 2014	12.74
338	8	"Pitbull Joins the Party"	1.99	October 20, 2014	12.58
339	9	"Halloween Night"	1.89	October 27, 2014	12.62
340	10	"Dynamic Duos Night"	2.00	November 3, 2014	13.09
341	11	"America's Choice Night"	1.99	November 10, 2014	13.31
342	12	"Plugged/Unplugged Night"	2.30	November 11, 2014	14.30
343	13	"Finals: Night 1"	2.47	November 24, 2014	14.35
344	14	"The Road to the Finals"	1.90	November 25, 2014	11.31
345	15	"Finals: Night 2"	2.95	November 25, 2014	15.98

== Scoring chart ==
The highest score each week is indicated in bold green with a dagger (†), while the lowest score each week is indicated in italicized red with a double-dagger (‡).

Color key:

Winners
Runners-up
Third place
Bottom two
Eliminated

Dancing with the Stars (season 19) - Weekly scores
Couple	Pl.													
Couple	Pl.	1	2	3	4	5	6	5+6	7	8	9	10	Night 1	Night 2
Alfonso & Witney	1st	**36**†	32	32	**40**†	34	**39**†	**73**†	36+32=68	38+3=41	37+40=**77**†	36+39=75	40+40=**80**†	+40=**120**† (Note: This couple finished in first place.)
Sadie & Mark	2nd	34	31	32	37	**36**†	35	71	30+32=62	38	33+40=73	37+37=74	38+40=78	+40=118 (Note: This couple finished in second place.)
Janel & Val	3rd	29	34	**40**†	36	33	33	66	31+36=67	40+3=**43**†	38+39=**77**†	40+38=**78**†	37+40=77 (Note: This couple was in the bottom two, but was not eliminated.)	+40=117‡ (Note: This couple finished in third place.)
Bethany & Derek	4th	32	33	**40**†	33	32	36	68	39+36=**75**†	37+3=40	36+38=74	36+40=76	36+40=76‡ (Note: This couple was eliminated.)	
Tommy & Peta	5th	27	28	34	28	23	28‡	51	28+32=60	26+3=29	29+28=57‡	28+34=62‡		
Lea & Artem	6th	32	**35**†	31	39	34	32	66	34+36=70	32	34+36=70			
Michael & Emma	7th	25	24‡	28	25	20‡	30	50	20+36=56‡	25‡				
Antonio & Cheryl	8th	25	31	29	29	28	28‡	56	27+32=59					
Jonathan & Allison	9th	30	30	32	24‡	24	32	56						
Betsey & Tony	10th	20‡	28	29	29									
Randy & Karina	11th	31	28	26‡										
Tavis & Sharna	12th	29	28											
Lolo & Keo	13th	22												

== Weekly scores ==
Individual judges' scores in the charts below (given in parentheses) are listed in this order from left to right: Carrie Ann Inaba, Len Goodman, Julianne Hough, Bruno Tonioli.

=== Week 1: Premiere Night ===
Couples performed the cha-cha-cha, foxtrot, or jive. Couples are listed in the order they performed.

Couple	Scores	Dance	Music	Result
Antonio & Cheryl	25 (6, 6, 6, 7)	Cha-cha-cha	"Tonight (I'm Lovin' You)" — Enrique Iglesias, feat. Ludacris & DJ Frank E	Safe
Lea & Artem	32 (8, 8, 8, 8)	Foxtrot	"This Will Be (An Everlasting Love)" — Natalie Cole	Safe
Janel & Val	29 (7, 7, 7, 8)	Jive	"Bang Bang" — Jessie J, Ariana Grande & Nicki Minaj	Safe
Lolo & Keo	22 (6, 6, 5, 5)	Cha-cha-cha	"Tell Her" — Rizzle Kicks	Eliminated
Betsey & Tony	20 (5, 5, 5, 5)	Cha-cha-cha	"Material Girl" — Madonna	Bottom two
Tavis & Sharna	29 (7, 7, 8, 7)	Foxtrot	"Pride and Joy" — Marvin Gaye	Safe
Sadie & Mark	34 (8, 8, 9, 9)	Cha-cha-cha	"Birthday" — Katy Perry	Safe
Michael & Emma	25 (7, 6, 6, 6)	Cha-cha-cha	"Born to Be Wild" — Steppenwolf	Safe
Jonathan & Allison	30 (8, 7, 7, 8)	Jive	"Dance with Me Tonight" — Olly Murs	Safe
Tommy & Peta	27 (7, 6, 7, 7)	Cha-cha-cha	"Drop It Like It's Hot" — Snoop Dogg, feat. Pharrell	Safe
Randy & Karina	31 (8, 7, 8, 8)	Foxtrot	"The Way You Look Tonight" — Frank Sinatra	Safe
Bethany & Derek	32 (8, 8, 8, 8)	Jive	"Shake It Off" — Taylor Swift	Safe
Alfonso & Witney	36 (9, 9, 9, 9)	Jive	"3-6-9" — Cupid, feat. B.o.B	Safe

=== Week 2: My Jam Monday ===
Couples performed one unlearned dance to some of their favorite songs. Couples are listed in the order they performed.

Couple	Scores	Dance	Music	Result
Randy & Karina	28 (7, 7, 7, 7)	Cha-cha-cha	"(I Can't Get No) Satisfaction" — Otis Redding	Safe
Janel & Val	34 (9, 8, 8, 9)	Foxtrot	"Call Me Maybe" — Carly Rae Jepsen	Safe
Lea & Artem	35 (9, 8, 9, 9)	Jive	"Land of a Thousand Dances" — Wilson Pickett	Safe
Michael & Emma	24 (6, 6, 6, 6)	Samba	"Girls in Bikinis" — Lee Brice	Safe
Tavis & Sharna	28 (7, 7, 7, 7)	Cha-cha-cha	"Boogie Wonderland" — Earth, Wind & Fire	Eliminated
Alfonso & Witney	32 (8, 8, 8, 8)	Samba	"Gettin' Jiggy wit It" — Will Smith	Safe
Bethany & Derek	33 (8, 9, 8, 8)	Foxtrot	"All About That Bass" — Meghan Trainor	Safe
Betsey & Tony	28 (7, 7, 7, 7)	Foxtrot	"Girls Just Want to Have Fun" — Cyndi Lauper	Safe
Antonio & Cheryl	31 (8, 7, 8, 8)	Rumba	"Adorn" — Miguel	Safe
Tommy & Peta	28 (7, 7, 7, 7)	Salsa	"Higher" — Gloria Estefan	Safe
Jonathan & Allison	30 (7, 7, 8, 8)	Cha-cha-cha	"Sing" — Ed Sheeran	Safe
Sadie & Mark	31 (8, 7, 8, 8)	Jazz	"She's Country" — Jason Aldean	Safe

=== Week 3: Movie Night ===
Individual judges scores in the chart below (given in parentheses) are listed in this order from left to right: Carrie Ann Inaba, Kevin Hart, Julianne Hough, Bruno Tonioli.

Couples performed one unlearned dance to famous film songs, and are listed in the order they performed.

Couple	Scores	Dance	Music	Film	Result
Randy & Karina	26 (7, 7, 6, 6)	Paso doble	"Eye of the Tiger" — Survivor	Rocky III	Eliminated
Alfonso & Witney	32 (8, 8, 8, 8)	Quickstep	"Hey Goldmember" — Beyoncé, feat. Devin & Solange	Austin Powers in Goldmember	Safe
Betsey & Tony	29 (7, 9, 6, 7)	Contemporary	"Unchained Melody" — The Righteous Brothers	Ghost	Safe
Lea & Artem	31 (7, 8, 8, 8)	Cha-cha-cha	"The Power of Love" — Huey Lewis and the News	Back to the Future	Safe
Michael & Emma	28 (7, 7, 7, 7)	Waltz	"(Everything I Do) I Do It for You" — Bryan Adams	Robin Hood: Prince of Thieves	Safe
Antonio & Cheryl	29 (7, 7, 7, 8)	Foxtrot	"Ain't No Mountain High Enough" — Marvin Gaye & Tammi Terrell	Guardians of the Galaxy	Safe
Sadie & Mark	32 (8, 8, 8, 8)	Viennese waltz	"Married Life" — Michael Giacchino	Up	Safe
Jonathan & Allison	32 (8, 8, 8, 8)	Tango	"Back to Black" — Beyoncé & André 3000	The Great Gatsby	Safe
Janel & Val	40 (10, 10, 10, 10)	Jazz	"America" — Leonard Bernstein	West Side Story	Safe
Tommy & Peta	34 (8, 10, 8, 8)	Argentine tango	"Por una Cabeza" — The Tango Project	Scent of a Woman	Safe
Bethany & Derek	40 (10, 10, 10, 10)	Jazz	"Singin' in the Rain" — Gene Kelly	Singin' in the Rain	Safe

=== Week 4: Most Memorable Year Night ===
Individual judges scores in the chart below (given in parentheses) are listed in this order from left to right: Carrie Ann Inaba, Julianne Hough, Bruno Tonioli, America's Score.

Couples performed one unlearned dance to celebrate the most memorable year of their lives. For the first time in the show's history, the general public was able to score each dance on a scale from 1 to 10, with an averaged score counting alongside the scores given by the three judges. Couples are listed in the order they performed.

Couple	Scores	Dance	Music	Result
Janel & Val	36 (9, 9, 9, 9)	Rumba	"How Will I Know" — Sam Smith	Safe
Jonathan & Allison	24 (6, 6, 6, 6)	Samba	"Milkshake" — Kelis	Safe
Betsey & Tony	29 (8, 7, 7, 7)	Jive	"Love Will Keep Us Together" — Captain & Tennille	Eliminated
Bethany & Derek	33 (8, 8, 8, 9)	Rumba	"Try" — Colbie Caillat	Safe
Michael & Emma	25 (6, 6, 6, 7)	Quickstep	"Giving It Up for Your Love" — Delbert McClinton	Safe
Lea & Artem	39 (10, 10, 10, 9)	Contemporary	"Dance with My Father" — Luther Vandross	Safe
Antonio & Cheryl	29 (7, 7, 7, 8)	Samba	"Love Will Never Do (Without You)" — Janet Jackson	Safe
Tommy & Peta	28 (7, 7, 7, 7)	Jive	"Jailhouse Rock" — Elvis Presley	Safe
Sadie & Mark	37 (9, 10, 9, 9)	Samba	"Hunter" — Pharrell Williams	Safe
Alfonso & Witney	40 (10, 10, 10, 10)	Jazz	"It's Not Unusual" — Tom Jones	Safe

=== Week 5: Switch-Up Night ===
Individual judges scores in the chart below (given in parentheses) are listed in this order from left to right: Carrie Ann Inaba, Jessie J, Julianne Hough, Bruno Tonioli.

Couples performed one unlearned dance with a different partner selected by the general public. All dance styles were new to the season. Couples are listed in the order they performed. No elimination took place at the end of the night.

Couple	Scores	Dance	Music
Antonio & Allison	28 (8, 6, 7, 7)	Bollywood	"One Two Three Four (Get On The Dance Floor)" — Vishal Dadlani, Hamsika Iyer & Sricharan
Bethany & Mark	32 (8, 8, 8, 8)	Hip-hop	"She Came to Give It to You" —Usher, feat. Nicki Minaj
Jonathan & Peta	24 (6, 6, 6, 6)	Jitterbug	"Rock This Town" — Joey Fatone
Alfonso & Cheryl	34 (8, 9, 9, 8)	Flamenco	"Angelica" — Hans Zimmer
Janel & Artem	33 (8, 8, 8, 9)	Burlesque	"Mamma Knows Best" — Jessie J
Michael & Witney	20 (5, 5, 5, 5)	Disco	"Car Wash" — Rose Royce
Tommy & Emma	23 (6, 6, 5, 6)	Mambo	"Pass the Dutchie" — Musical Youth
Sadie & Derek	36 (9, 9, 9, 9)	Charleston	"Crazy Stupid Love" — Cheryl, feat. Tinie Tempah
Lea & Val	34 (9, 8, 8, 9)	Broadway	"You Can't Stop the Beat" — from Hairspray

=== Week 6: Pitbull Joins the Party ===
Individual judges scores in the chart below (given in parentheses) are listed in this order from left to right: Carrie Ann Inaba, Pitbull, Julianne Hough, Bruno Tonioli.

Couples performed one unlearned dance to guest judge Pitbull's favorite tracks. Couples are listed in the order they performed.

Leah Remini filled in as co-host for Erin Andrews.

Couple	Scores	Dance	Music	Result
Jonathan & Allison	32 (8, 8, 8, 8)	Jazz	"Back in Time" — Pitbull	Eliminated
Janel & Val	33 (8, 7, 9, 9)	Samba	"La Vida Es Un Carnaval" — Celia Cruz	Safe
Tommy & Peta	28 (7, 7, 7, 7)	Foxtrot	"September" — Earth, Wind & Fire	Safe
Antonio & Cheryl	28 (7, 7, 7, 7)	Salsa	"Bailando" — Enrique Iglesias, feat. Gente de Zona, Descemer Bueno & Sean Paul	Safe
Sadie & Mark	35 (9, 10, 8, 8)	Rumba	"Diamonds" — Rihanna	Safe
Lea & Artem	32 (8, 8, 8, 8)	Salsa	"Sexy People (The Fiat Song)" — Arianna, feat. Pitbull	Safe
Michael & Emma	30 (8, 7, 8, 7)	Argentine tango	"Give Me Everything" — Ray Chew	Safe
Bethany & Derek	36 (9, 9, 9, 9)	Tango	"Jealous (I Ain't with It)" — Chromeo	Safe
Alfonso & Witney	39 (10, 10, 9, 10)	Salsa	"Booty" — Jennifer Lopez, feat. Pitbull	Safe

=== Week 7: Halloween Night ===
Couples performed one unlearned dance and a team dance to Halloween themes and songs. Couples are listed in the order they performed.

Len Goodman returned to the judging panel after a four-week absence.

Couple	Scores	Dance	Music	Result
Tommy & Peta	28 (7, 7, 7, 7)	Quickstep	"That Old Black Magic" — Louis Prima & Keely Smith	Safe
Lea & Artem	34 (8, 8, 9, 9)	Argentine tango	"Necessary Evil" — Nikki Yanofsky	Safe
Bethany & Derek	39 (10, 9, 10, 10)	Paso doble	"Run Boy Run" — Woodkid	Safe
Antonio & Cheryl	27 (6, 7, 7, 7)	Viennese waltz	"I Put a Spell on You" — Nina Simone	Eliminated
Michael & Emma	20 (5, 5, 5, 5)	Jive	"The Devil Went Down to Georgia" — Charlie Daniels Band	Safe
Janel & Val	31 (8, 7, 8, 8)	Viennese waltz	"Secret" — The Pierces	Safe
Alfonso & Witney	36 (9, 9, 9, 9)	Rumba	"Ghost" — Ella Henderson	Safe
Sadie & Mark	30 (7, 7, 8, 8)	Paso doble	"Come with Me Now" — Kongos	Safe
Bethany & Derek Janel & Val Lea & Artem Michael & Emma	36 (9, 9, 9, 9)	Freestyle (Team "Itsy Bitsy")	"Black Widow" — Iggy Azalea, feat. Rita Ora	
Alfonso & Witney Antonio & Cheryl Sadie & Mark Tommy & Peta	32 (8, 8, 8, 8)	Freestyle (Team "Creepy")	"Time Warp" — from Glee	

=== Week 8: Dynamic Duos Night ===
Couples performed one unlearned dance honoring famous popular culture pairings. The couple with the highest score earned an immunity from elimination, while the rest of the couples participated in dance-offs for extra points. Couples are listed in the order they performed.

Couple	Scores	Dance	Music	Dynamic duo	Result
Lea & Artem	32 (8, 8, 8, 8)	Jazz	"Somethin' Bad" — Miranda Lambert & Carrie Underwood	Bonnie & Clyde	Safe
Michael & Emma	25 (6, 7, 6, 6)	Foxtrot	"You'll Be in My Heart" — Phil Collins	Tarzan & Jane Porter	Eliminated
Janel & Val	40 (10, 10, 10, 10)	Contemporary	"Everybody's Free (To Feel Good)" — Quindon Tarver	Romeo & Juliet	Immunity
Tommy & Peta	26 (6, 7, 7, 6)	Paso doble	"Ring of Fire" — Johnny Cash	Johnny & June Cash	Safe
Sadie & Mark	38 (9, 9, 10, 10)	Contemporary	"Uninvited" — BC Jean	Adam & Eve	Safe
Alfonso & Witney	38 (10, 9, 9, 10)	Cha-cha-cha	"Trust" — Prince	Batman & Robin	Safe
Bethany & Derek	37 (9, 9, 9, 10)	Salsa	"Babalu" — Desi Arnaz	Lucy & Ricky Ricardo	Safe

Dance-offs
Couple	Dance	Music	Result
Alfonso & Witney	Jive	"Rip It Up" — Little Richard	Winners
Lea & Artem	Jive	"Rip It Up" — Little Richard	Losers
Bethany & Derek	Cha-cha-cha	"Really Don't Care" — Demi Lovato, feat. Cher Lloyd	Winners
Sadie & Mark	Cha-cha-cha	"Really Don't Care" — Demi Lovato, feat. Cher Lloyd	Losers
Tommy & Peta	Rumba	"I'm Not the Only One" — Sam Smith	Winners
Michael & Emma	Rumba	"I'm Not the Only One" — Sam Smith	Losers

=== Week 9: America's Choice Night ===
Couples performed a routine to an unlearned dance and song that was chosen by the public, as well as a trio dance involving an eliminated pro or a member of the dance troupe. Couples are listed in the order they performed.

Couple	Trio partner	Scores	Dance	Music	Result
Alfonso & Witney	Lindsay Arnold	37 (9, 9, 9, 10)	Foxtrot	"Ain't That a Kick in the Head?" — Robbie Williams	Safe
Alfonso & Witney	Lindsay Arnold	40 (10, 10, 10, 10)	Paso doble	"Turn Down for What" — DJ Snake & Lil Jon	Safe
Tommy & Peta	Sharna Burgess	29 (7, 8, 7, 7)	Viennese waltz	"Trouble" — Ray LaMontagne	Safe
Tommy & Peta	Sharna Burgess	28 (7, 7, 7, 7)	Samba	"Talk Dirty" — Jason Derulo, feat. 2 Chainz	Safe
Lea & Artem	Henry Byalikov	34 (8, 9, 8, 9)	Samba	"Animals" — Maroon 5	Eliminated
Lea & Artem	Henry Byalikov	36 (9, 9, 9, 9)	Paso doble	"Black Betty" — Ram Jam	Eliminated
Bethany & Derek	Tony Dovolani	36 (9, 9, 9, 9)	Viennese waltz	"Say You Love Me" — Jessie Ware	Safe
Bethany & Derek	Tony Dovolani	38 (9, 10, 10, 9)	Argentine tango	"Jungle" — X Ambassadors & Jamie N Commons, feat. Jay-Z	Safe
Sadie & Mark	Emma Slater	33 (8, 9, 8, 8)	Jive	"1, 2, 3 Turnaround" — Christian TV	Safe
Sadie & Mark	Emma Slater	40 (10, 10, 10, 10)	Foxtrot	"Can't Take My Eyes Off You" — Frankie Valli	Safe
Janel & Val	Keo Motsepe	38 (9, 10, 10, 9)	Quickstep	"Hey Boy! Hey Girl!" — Louis Prima & Keely Smith	Safe
Janel & Val	Keo Motsepe	39 (10, 9, 10, 10)	Salsa	"Morning Drums" — Gregor Salto	Safe

=== Week 10: Plugged/Unplugged Night ===
Couples performed two unlearned dances to the same song, with one version being the original track, and the other being an acoustic version. Couples are listed in the order they performed.

Couple	Scores	Dance	Music	Result
Sadie & Mark	37 (9, 10, 9, 9)	Quickstep	"Problem" —Ariana Grande, feat. Iggy Azalea	Safe
Sadie & Mark	37 (9, 9, 10, 9)	Argentine tango	"Problem" —Ariana Grande, feat. Iggy Azalea	Safe
Tommy & Peta	28 (7, 7, 7, 7)	Jazz	"Tainted Love" — Soft Cell	Eliminated
Tommy & Peta	34 (9, 8, 9, 8)	Rumba	"Tainted Love" — Soft Cell	Eliminated
Bethany & Derek	36 (9, 9, 9, 9)	Samba	"I Want You Back" — The Jackson 5	Safe
Bethany & Derek	40 (10, 10, 10, 10)	Contemporary	"I Want You Back" — The Jackson 5	Safe
Janel & Val	40 (10, 10, 10, 10)	Paso doble	"Blame" — Calvin Harris, feat. John Newman	Safe
Janel & Val	38 (9, 9, 10, 10)	Argentine tango	"Blame" — Calvin Harris, feat. John Newman	Safe
Alfonso & Witney	36 (9, 9, 9, 9)	Argentine tango	"Love Runs Out" — OneRepublic	Safe
Alfonso & Witney	39 (10, 9, 10, 10)	Contemporary	"Love Runs Out" — OneRepublic	Safe

=== Week 11: Finals ===
On the first night, the finalists performed a previous routine chosen by the judges and a freestyle dance. On the second night, the couples danced a fusion dance of two previously learned dance styles. Couples are listed in the order they performed.

Night 1

Couple	Scores	Dance	Music	Result
Bethany & Derek	36 (9, 9, 9, 9)	Jive	"Shake It Off" — Taylor Swift	Eliminated
Bethany & Derek	40 (10, 10, 10, 10)	Freestyle	"Revolution (District 78 Remix)" — Diplo, feat. Faustix & Imanos and Kai	Eliminated
Sadie & Mark	38 (10, 9, 10, 9)	Samba	"Hunter" — Pharrell Williams	Safe
Sadie & Mark	40 (10, 10, 10, 10)	Freestyle	"Super Mario Bros. Theme" — Koji Kondo	Safe
Janel & Val	37 (9, 10, 9, 9)	Samba	"La Vida Es Un Carnaval" — Celia Cruz	Bottom two
Janel & Val	40 (10, 10, 10, 10)	Freestyle	"I'm Gonna Be (500 Miles)" — Sleeping at Last	Bottom two
Alfonso & Witney	40 (10, 10, 10, 10)	Jive	"3-6-9" — Cupid, feat. B.o.B	Safe
Alfonso & Witney	40 (10, 10, 10, 10)	Freestyle	"Sing, Sing, Sing (With a Swing)" — Benny Goodman "Apache" — The Sugarhill Gang	Safe

Night 2

Couple	Scores	Dance	Music	Result
Sadie & Mark	40 (10, 10, 10, 10)	Quickstep & Samba	"Nitty Gritty" — Kimberly Cole	Runners-up
Janel & Val	40 (10, 10, 10, 10)	Foxtrot & Paso doble	"Hideaway" — Kiesza	Third place
Alfonso & Witney	40 (10, 10, 10, 10)	Argentine tango & Cha-cha-cha	"Shut Up and Dance" — Walk the Moon	Winners

== Dance chart ==
The couples performed the following each week:

- Week 1: One unlearned dance (cha-cha-cha, foxtrot, or jive)
- Week 2: One unlearned dance
- Week 3: One unlearned dance
- Week 4: One unlearned dance
- Week 5: One new dance style
- Week 6: One unlearned dance
- Week 7: One unlearned dance & team dance
- Week 8: One unlearned dance & dance-offs
- Week 9: One unlearned dance & trio dance
- Week 10: Two unlearned dances
- Week 11 (Finals, Night 1): Judge's choice & freestyle
- Week 11 (Finals, Night 2): Fusion dance

Color key:

No scores received

Dancing with the Stars (season 19) - Dance chart
Couple	Week																
Couple	1	2	3	4	5	6	7		8		9		10		11		
Couple	1	2	3	4	5	6	7		8		9		10		Night 1		Night 2
Alfonso & Witney	Jive	Samba	Quickstep	Jazz	Flamenco	Salsa	Rumba	Team Freestyle	Cha-cha-cha	Jive	Foxtrot	Paso doble	Argentine tango	Contemp.	Jive	Freestyle	Argentine tango & Cha-cha-cha
Sadie & Mark	Cha-cha-cha	Jazz	Viennese waltz	Samba	Charleston	Rumba	Paso doble	Team Freestyle	Contemp.	Cha-cha-cha	Jive	Foxtrot	Quickstep	Argentine tango	Samba	Freestyle	Quickstep & Samba
Janel & Val	Jive	Foxtrot	Jazz	Rumba	Burlesque	Samba	Viennese waltz	Team Freestyle	Contemp.	Immunity	Quickstep	Salsa	Paso doble	Argentine tango	Samba	Freestyle	Foxtrot & Paso doble
Bethany & Derek	Jive	Foxtrot	Jazz	Rumba	Hip-hop	Tango	Paso doble	Team Freestyle	Salsa	Cha-cha-cha	Viennese waltz	Argentine tango	Samba	Contemp.	Jive	Freestyle	Freestyle & Paso doble (Note: No scores were received for this dance.)
Tommy & Peta	Cha-cha-cha	Salsa	Argentine tango	Jive	Mambo	Foxtrot	Quickstep	Team Freestyle	Paso doble	Rumba	Viennese waltz	Samba	Jazz	Rumba			Cha-cha-cha
Lea & Artem	Foxtrot	Jive	Cha-cha-cha	Contemp.	Broadway	Salsa	Argentine tango	Team Freestyle	Jazz	Jive	Samba	Paso doble					Jive
Michael & Emma	Cha-cha-cha	Samba	Waltz	Quickstep	Disco	Argentine tango	Jive	Team Freestyle	Foxtrot	Rumba							Cha-cha-cha
Antonio & Cheryl	Cha-cha-cha	Rumba	Foxtrot	Samba	Bollywood	Salsa	Viennese waltz	Team Freestyle									Cha-cha-cha
Jonathan & Allison	Jive	Cha-cha-cha	Tango	Samba	Jitterbug	Jazz											Jazz
Betsey & Tony	Cha-cha-cha	Foxtrot	Contemp.	Jive													Cha-cha-cha
Randy & Karina	Foxtrot	Cha-cha-cha	Paso doble														Foxtrot
Tavis & Sharna	Foxtrot	Cha-cha-cha															
Lolo & Keo	Cha-cha-cha																
