= Dance Central 3 =

2012 video game

- Developers: Harmonix; Backbone Entertainment
- Publisher: Microsoft Studios
- Director: Matt Boch
- Producer: Jon Carter
- Designers: Jim Toepel; Marcus Montgomery
- Programmers: Ryan Challinor; Isaac Bender
- Artists: Matt Perlot; Lisette Titre
- Writer: Helen McWilliams
- Series: Dance Central
- Platform: Xbox 360
- Release: NA: October 16, 2012; AU: October 18, 2012; EU: October 19, 2012
- Genre: Rhythm
- Modes: Single-player, multiplayer

Dance Central 3 is a 2012 rhythm game developed by Harmonix and Backbone Entertainment and published by Microsoft Studios for the Xbox 360 Kinect. It is the sequel to Dance Central 2 (2011) and the third installment in the Dance Central series. It was released on October 16, 2012, in the Americas, and October 19 everywhere else.

A sequel to the game, titled Dance Central Spotlight, was released for the Xbox One Kinect on September 2, 2014.

== Gameplay ==
Two teams of three people posing for crew photos in Crew Throwdown, a gameplay mode in Dance Central 3

The core gameplay for Dance Central 3 follows the same formula as the previous installments. One or two players must mimic the on-screen dancer with Flashcards for guidance. Players gain points depending on how well they perform each move, and their score determines the amount of Stars they earn.

Dance Central 3 features a new mode called Crew Throwdown. In this mode, 2–8 players compete against each other. After each team poses for a crew photo, the game will choose a song and one of the four types of modes to play it in. Those modes are:

- Perform: A standard mode where players dance to the routine. The game will occasionally stop counting points for one player and focus on the other. A minigame called "Free For All", in which players are given random moves and compete to perform them first, can appear during a routine, and "Strike A Pose" can appear after routines.
- Keep The Beat: A freestyle minigame where players stay in beat to the song for points. Consecutive positive ratings and more unique moves will give the players extra points.
- Strike A Pose: A minigame where players mimic the poses the characters are doing for points. Performing more moves in a row increases the number of points players can get. If a player misses a pose, they have to wait for a short amount of time before they can start posing again.
- Showdown: This mode functions the same way as Perform with the exception of who plays against who. In this final round, as opposed to the game choosing someone from each team, any player can face off against one another.

The game also has a new Live Challenge feature. In this mode, players can compete to beat scores set by other players connected to Xbox Live.

Additionally, the game features a new level system. Points are given based on number of Stars earned in a song. Players can also earn bonus points by playing harder songs and routines, playing new songs, passing gold moves, passing 100% of the routine's moves, and completing story milestones. Leveling up rewards the player with unlockables, specifically outfits and new characters.

== Plot ==
The player is recruited into Dance Central Intelligence (DCI) by Rasa and Lima to stop Dr. Tan's plans of world domination. Having received intel that he is using dance moves from the last five decades as a part of his plans, DCI has sent dance crews back in time to learn these moves to use them against him. As part of their mission, the player time travels to find these crews and return them back to the present by learning the dance craze of their decade. This is done by collecting Power Moves found in routines and putting them together to unlock a new routine based on the craze. Additionally, they must dance enough to power Boomy, a boombox enabling them to time travel, to go back to the present. Dr. Tan's armies have spread to the point where the DCI headquarters are the only safe place left, so it is imperative that the crews are brought back as soon as possible.

The player travels to the seventies to meet Lu$h Crew and learn the Hustle, the eighties to meet Hi-Def and learn the Electric Slide, the nineties to meet Flash4wrd and learn the Macarena, and the 2000s to meet Riptide and learn the Cupid Shuffle. In the meantime, DCI investigated the head devices that members of Dr. Tan's army are wearing in search of countermeasures. Additionally, Dare and MacCoy, two DCI agents who had gone missing, were found, albeit as a part of Dr. Tan's army via mind control. While the player is in the 2000s, DCI is attacked by Dr. Tan's army, and when they come back, Emilia and Bodie are forcefully taken away. They, along with all the other crews brought to DCI HQ, were revealed to have been sent to the prehistoric era by Dr. Tan. After freeing Rasa and Lima from his mind control, the analysis on their head devices finishes and reveals their weakness: creative expression. After learning that the craze of the 2010s is the Scream, the player then time travels to the future, where Dr. Tan seeks to dominate the world by controlling everyone's dance moves. He, his new robots, and his mind-controlled son Oblio are defeated by the player in a dance battle using the crazes they previously learned. With the encouragement of a now liberated Oblio, they trap Dr. Tan in the time stream with freestyle dancing and return to DCI HQ.

While the player was battling Dr. Tan in the future, all the dance crews were rescued and brought back to the present, including Dare and MacCoy.

=== Master Quests ===
Once the player completes the Story mode, Master Quests become available. These quests contain all the songs each crew is defaulted for in Dance Central 3, and once the player earns every Star within the quests, they unlock a QR code, that could be scanned to view art of the in-game characters. This feature is no longer available; scanning the code now redirects the player to the main Dance Central website.

== Characters ==
Dance Central 3 features returning characters from previous Dance Central games as well as new characters. Like in Dance Central 2, characters are divided into pairs as crews. Each crew featured in the story campaign also has a venue associated with them. There are 20 characters total, with 10 being available from the start and 10 being unlockables.

- Dance Central Intelligence (DCI): Includes Rasa and Lima, two new characters. Their associated venue is DCI HQ.
- Lu$h Crew: Includes Miss Aubrey and Angel. Their associated venue is Free Skate.
- Hi-Def: Includes Mo and Glitch. Their associated venue is Toprock Ave.
- Flash4wrd: Includes Taye and Li'l T. Their associated venue is Invite Only.
- Riptide: Includes Emilia and Bodie. Their associated venue is Studio 675.
- D-Coy: Includes Dare and MacCoy. Unlockable by completing story mode.
- The Glitterati: Includes Kerith and Jaryn. Unlockable by leveling up.
- Murder of Crows (M.O.C.): Includes Dr. Tan and Oblio. Their associated venue is Crow's Nest. Unlockable by leveling up.
- Icon Crew: Includes Marcos and Frenchy. Unlockable by leveling up.
- Ninja Crew: Includes Shinju and Kichi. Unlockable by leveling up.
- D-Cypher: Includes CYPH-56 and CYPH-78. Unlockable by leveling up

Most characters have two alternative outfits that can be unlocked by leveling up, one being their Crew Look from their appearances in previous Dance Central games and the other being their DCI Agent outfit. Additionally, most characters who appeared in the first Dance Central game have an extra DC Classic outfit based on their appearances in that game.

== Soundtrack ==
=== Songs ===
The following 46 songs appear on the Dance Central 3 disc.

Song	Artist	Year	Choreographer	Difficulty (Out of 7)	Crew	Default character & outfit	Default venue
"1, 2 Step"	Ciara ft. Missy Elliott	2004	Chanel Thompson	2	Riptide	Emilia – Retro Fitted	Studio 675
"Ain't 2 Proud 2 Beg"	TLC	1991	Frenchy Hernandez	4	Flash4wrd	Taye – Retro Fitted	Invite Only
"Around the World"	Daft Punk	1997	Kunle Oladehin	6	Hi-Def	Mo – DCI Agent	DCI HQ
"Bass Down Low"	Dev ft. The Cataracs	2010	Nick DeMoura	5	DCI	Rasa – DCI Agent	DCI HQ
"Better Off Alone"	Alice DeeJay	1998	Marcos Aguirre	1	Lu$h Crew	Angel – DCI Agent	DCI HQ
"Beware of the Boys (Mundian To Bach Ke)"	Panjabi MC	1997	Ricardo Foster Jr.	5	Hi-Def	Glitch – DCI Agent	Toprock Ave.
"Boom Boom Pow"	Black Eyed Peas	2009	Marcos Aguirre	3	Flash4wrd	Li'l T. – DCI Agent	Studio 675
"Boyfriend"	Justin Bieber	2012	Torey Nelson	3	DCI	Rasa – DCI Agent	DCI HQ
"Calabria (2008)"	Enur ft. Natasja	2008	Chanel Thompson	5	Riptide	Emilia – Retro Fitted	Studio 675
"Ching-a-Ling"	Missy Elliott	2008	Frenchy Hernandez	5	Lu$h Crew	Miss Aubrey – DCI Agent	DCI HQ
"Cupid Shuffle"	Cupid	2007	Devin Woolridge	3	Riptide	Bodie – Retro Fitted	Studio 675
"Da Butt"	E.U.	1988	Ricardo Foster Jr.	3	Hi-Def	Mo – Retro Fitted	Toprock Ave.
"Disco Inferno"	The Trammps	1976	Frenchy Hernandez	3	Lu$h Crew	Miss Aubrey – Retro Fitted	Free Skate
"Electric Boogie"	Marcia Griffiths	1982	Kunle Oledehin	4	Hi-Def	Mo – Retro Fitted	Toprock Ave.
"Everybody (Backstreet's Back)"	Backstreet Boys	1997	Spikey Soria	4	Flash4wrd	Li'l T. – Retro Fitted	Invite Only
"Firework"	Katy Perry	2010	Chanel Thompson	3	Riptide	Emilia – DCI Agent	Studio 675
"Get Low"	Lil Jon & The East Side Boyz ft. Ying Yang Twins	2003	Devin Woolridge	5	Riptide	Bodie – Retro Fitted	Studio 675
"Hello"	Martin Solveig ft. Dragonette	2010	Marcos Aguirre	5	Lu$h Crew	Miss Aubrey – DCI Agent	Crow's Nest
"I Am the Best"	2NE1	2011	Frenchy Hernandez	5	Flash4wrd	Taye – DCI Agent	Crow's Nest
"I Will Survive"	Gloria Gaynor	1978	Frenchy Hernandez	3	Lu$h Crew	Miss Aubrey – Retro Fitted	Free Skate
"Ice Ice Baby"	Vanilla Ice	1990	Marcos Aguirre	3	Flash4wrd	Li'l T. – Retro Fitted	Toprock Ave.
"In Da Club"	50 Cent	2003	Devin Woolridge	2	Riptide	Bodie – Retro Fitted	Studio 675
"Let the Music Play"	Shannon	1983	Ricardo Foster Jr.	4	Hi-Def	Glitch – Retro Fitted	Toprock Ave.
"Macarena (Bayside Boys Mix)"	Los Del Rio	1996	Frenchy Hernandez	2	Flash4wrd	Taye – Retro Fitted	Invite Only
"Moves Like Jagger"	Maroon 5 ft. Christina Aguilera	2011	Devin Woolridge	6	Riptide	Bodie – DCI Agent	Toprock Ave.
"Mr. Saxobeat"	Alexandra Stan	2011	Marcos Aguirre	4	DCI	Lima – DCI Agent	DCI HQ
"Now That We Found Love"	Heavy D & The Boyz	1991	Chanel Thompson	6	Flash4wrd	Taye – Retro Fitted	Invite Only
"OMG"	Usher ft. will.i.am	2010	Aakomon "AJ" Jones and Usher	7	DCI	Rasa – DCI Agent	DCI HQ
"On The Floor"	Jennifer Lopez ft. Pitbull	2011	Chanel Thompson	5	Riptide	Emilia – DCI Agent	DCI HQ
"Samba de Janeiro"	Bellini	1999	Devin Woolridge	5	Riptide	Bodie – Crew Look	Toprock Ave.
"Scream"	Usher	2012	Aakomon "AJ" Jones and Usher	5	DCI	Rasa – DCI Agent	DCI HQ
"Sexy and I Know It"	LMFAO	2011	Torey Nelson	6	DCI	Lima – DCI Agent	DCI HQ
"Starships"	Nicki Minaj	2012	Torey Nelson	2	DCI	Rasa – DCI Agent	DCI HQ
"Stereo Love"	Edward Maya & Vika Jigulina	2009	Marcos Aguirre	4	Lu$h Crew	Angel – DC Classic	Studio 675
"Stronger (What Doesn't Kill You)"	Kelly Clarkson	2012	Spikey Soria	7	Flash4wrd	Li'l T. – DCI Agent	Invite Only
"Supersonic"	J.J. Fad	1988	Ricardo Foster Jr.	6	Hi-Def	Glitch – Retro Fitted	Toprock Ave.
"Tan-Step"	M-Cue	2012	Ricardo Foster Jr.	5	Murder of Crows	Oblio – Crew Look	Crow's Nest
"Take Over Control"	Afrojack ft. Eva Simons	2010	Spikey Soria	5	Flash4wrd	Taye – DCI Agent	Crow's Nest
"Teach Me How to Dougie"	Cali Swag District	2010	Torey Nelson	5	DCI	Lima – DCI Agent	DCI HQ
"The Hustle"	Van McCoy	1975	Marcos Aguirre	1	Lu$h Crew	Angel – Retro Fitted	Free Skate
"Turn the Beat Around"	Vicki Sue Robinson	1976	Marcos Aguirre	3	Lu$h Crew	Angel – Retro Fitted	Free Skate
"(When You Gonna) Give It Up to Me"	Sean Paul ft. Keyshia Cole	2006	Marcos Aguirre	2	Hi-Def	Glitch – DCI Agent	Studio 675
"Wild Ones"	Flo Rida	2011	Kunle Oladehin	5	Hi-Def	Mo – DCI Agent	Studio 675
"Y.M.C.A."	Village People	1978	Marcos Aguirre	1	Lu$h Crew	Angel – Retro Fitted	Free Skate
"You Got It (The Right Stuff)"	New Kids on the Block	1988	Kunle Oladehin	3	Hi-Def	Mo – Retro Fitted	Toprock Ave.
"You Make Me Feel..."	Cobra Starship ft. Sabi	2011	Torey Nelson	7	DCI	Lima – DCI Agent	DCI HQ

=== Importable content ===
Players can import songs from Dance Central 2 for a set price. If a physical disc is used to perform the import function, the player will also need the unique code from the manual. However, if a Games on Demand version of Dance Central 2 is used, then no export code is required.

The import of the original Dance Central songs was previously possible with the same method and price as for Dance Central 2. Since October 25, 2016, new import purchases are no longer possible (old purchases remain intact). If the player has previously imported the original Dance Central into Dance Central 2, it is also available in Dance Central 3.

=== Downloadable content ===
All previous downloadable songs are forward compatible with Dance Central 3. However, any new content released on or after October 16, 2012, is only compatible with Dance Central 3.

On March 8, 2013, Harmonix announced that new DLC releases for Dance Central 3 would end after March due to the company shifting its resources to next generation projects.

Song	Artists	Decade	Choreographer	Difficulty (Out of 7)	Crew	Default character & outfit	Default venue	Release date	Dance Pack
"Euphoria"	Usher	2012	Aakomon "AJ" Jones and Usher	5	DCI	Rasa – DCI Agent	DCI HQ	November 20, 2012	13
"Twisted"	Usher ft. Pharrell	2012	Aakomon "AJ" Jones and Usher	6	DCI	Rasa – DCI Agent	DCI HQ	November 20, 2012	13
"Gangnam Style" (Note: This song features the full version, unlike the other tracks in to the Dance Central series, which has the short version.)	PSY	2012	Devin Woolridge	5	Riptide	Bodie – Retro Fitted	DCI HQ	November 27, 2012	12
"Call Me Maybe"	Carly Rae Jepsen	2012	Spikey Soria	7	Flash4wrd	Li'l T. – DCI Agent	Studio 675	December 4, 2012	12
"Alejandro"	Lady Gaga	2010	Marcos Aguirre	3	Lu$h Crew	Angel – Street Style	DCI HQ	December 25, 2012	12
"Paparazzi"	Lady Gaga	2009	Marcos Aguirre	4	Flash4wrd	Taye – Crew Look	Invite Only	December 25, 2012	12
"Sorry for Party Rocking"	LMFAO	2012	Kunle Oladehin	5	Hi-Def	Mo – Street Style	DCI HQ	December 31, 2012	12
"Whip It"	Nicki Minaj	2012	Marcos Aguirre	5	DCI	Lima – DCI Agent	Studio 675	January 8, 2013	12
"International Love"	Pitbull ft. Chris Brown	2011	Kunle Oladehin	5	Hi-Def	Mo – Street Style	Studio 675	January 15, 2013	13
"Hey Baby (Drop It to the Floor)"	Pitbull ft. T-Pain	2010	Torey Nelson	7	Riptide	Bodie – Retro Fitted	DCI HQ	January 15, 2013	13
"Glad You Came"	The Wanted	2011	Marcos Aguirre	2	Lu$h Crew	Angel – Street Style	Studio 675	January 22, 2013	12
"Let It Roll"	Flo Rida	2012	Ricardo Foster Jr.	5	D-Coy	MacCoy – DC Classic	DCI HQ	January 29, 2013	
"What Makes You Beautiful"	One Direction	2011	Marcos Aguirre	2	Lu$h Crew	Miss Aubrey – DC Classic	Invite Only	February 5, 2013	13
"Beauty and a Beat"	Justin Bieber ft. Nicki Minaj	2012	Marcos Aguirre	5	Lu$h Crew	Angel – DC Classic	Studio 675	February 12, 2013	12
"All Around the World"	Justin Bieber ft. Ludacris	2012	Chanel Thompson	6	Riptide	Emilia – DCI Agent	DCI HQ	February 12, 2013	12
"Lights"	Ellie Goulding	2011	Ricardo Foster Jr.	6	Hi-Def	Glitch – DCI Agent	Toprock Ave.	February 19, 2013	12
"Airplanes"	B.o.B ft. Hayley Williams	2010	Torey Nelson	4	DCI	Rasa – DCI Agent	DCI HQ	February 26, 2013	
"Take Care"	Drake ft. Rihanna	2012	Devin Woolridge	1	Riptide	Bodie – DCI Agent	Studio 675	March 5, 2013	12
"Umbrella"	Rihanna ft. Jay-Z	2007	Chanel Thompson	4	Riptide	Emilia – DCI Agent	Toprock Ave.	March 12, 2013	12
"SOS"	Rihanna	2006	Spikey Soria	5	Flash4wrd	Li'l T. – DCI Agent	Crow's Nest	March 12, 2013	12
"London Bridge"	Fergie	2006	Marcos Aguirre	3	Lu$h Crew	Miss Aubrey – Street Style	Invite Only	March 19, 2013	12

== Awards and nominations ==
During the 16th Annual D.I.C.E. Awards, the Academy of Interactive Arts & Sciences nominated Dance Central 3 for "Family Game of the Year".
