= Aubrey O'Day =

American singer and reality television personality (born 1984)

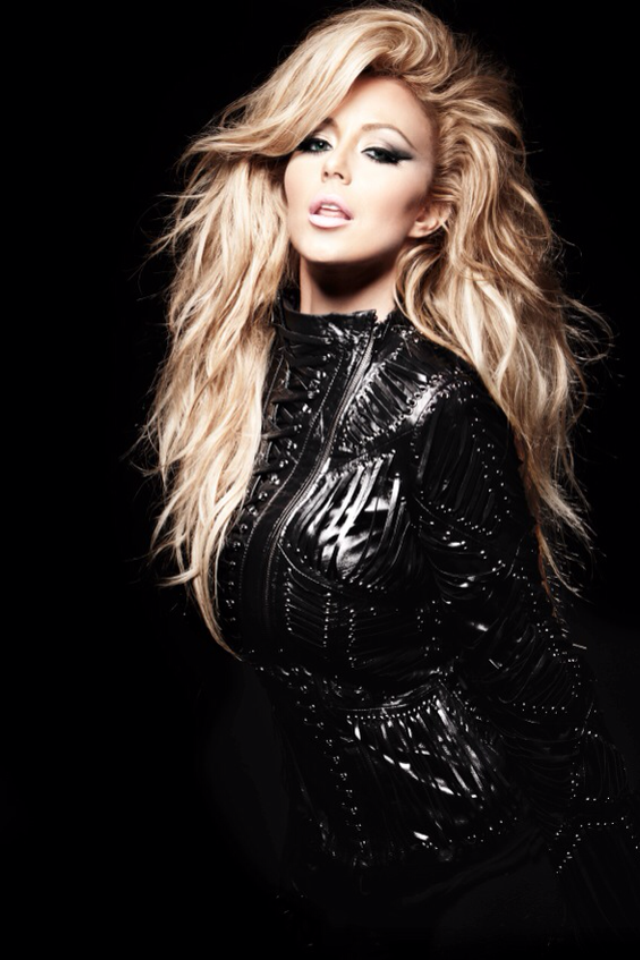
- O'Day in 2013

Background information
- Born: Aubrey Morgan O'Day; February 11, 1984 (age 42); Irvine, California, U.S.
- Genres: R&B; pop; hip hop; blue-eyed soul; dance
- Occupations: Singer; television personality; actress; model
- Years active: 2004–present
- Labels: Universal Republic; Bad Boy; SRC-Epic Records
- Formerly of: Dumblonde; Danity Kane

Aubrey Morgan O'Day (born February 11, 1984) is an American singer and television personality best known for her time as a member of the girl group Danity Kane, which was formed by Sean "P. Diddy" Combs for the third season of his reality series Making the Band, where O'Day first rose to promincence.

In 2011, she signed a solo record deal with SRC/Universal Motown Records and released her debut EP Between Two Evils in 2013. From 2015 to 2019, O'Day performed in the duo Dumblonde with former DK bandmate Shannon Bex, as well as former DK bandmate Dawn Richards, whom she released music with in 2020 as Aubrey x Dawn.

O'Day has modeled for magazines such as Blender and Playboy and performed on Broadway in Hairspray. Additionally, O'Day has made appearances on reality television shows, including her own show All About Aubrey, the fifth season of The Celebrity Apprentice, Famously Single, Marriage Boot Camp, Ex on the Beach, Celebrity Big Brother, and The Masked Singer.

== Early life ==
O'Day began performing at age five. "I lived on the stage, and even at six, slept behind the seats of the theatre", she stated in an interview. According to her mother, when O'Day was four, she was at a performance of The Nutcracker and started to cry. Her mother asked her what was wrong and O'Day replied, "I'm sad that I'm sitting here and not up on stage." O'Day recalls that moment as the one in which she "officially" realized her love for entertainment.

O'Day played lead characters in various musical productions, including Dorothy in The Wizard of Oz, Carmen in Fame, Sandy in Grease, Liesl in The Sound of Music, Tzeitel in Fiddler on the Roof, and Mimi in Rent. She also appeared in Annie. O'Day's childhood leaned heavily toward auditions and acting gigs more than school.

O'Day attended La Quinta High School. She later majored in political science and drama and graduated with a degree in political science from University of California, Irvine, and is a member of the Alpha Chi Omega sorority. While attending the University of California, Irvine, O'Day studied abroad on Semester at Sea.

== Career ==
=== 2004–08: Making the Band 3 and Danity Kane ===
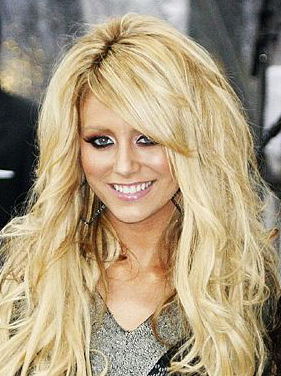
O'Day in 2006

O'Day was discovered in 2004 when she was cast on the MTV reality show Making the Band 3, founded by Sean "Diddy" Combs, and emerged as the show's breakout star. During Season 2 of Making the Band 3 while the competition was still ongoing, Blender magazine contacted O'Day to pose for their September 2005 issue. The magazine described her as the contestant "who bared calm resolve and tanned hip bones in beating out almost 10,000 girls for the chance at singing and strutting in a P. Diddy–steered girl group". O'Day expressed anxiety about competing to be in the group. "I've been in the 'cut' situation several times", she stated. "It's hard to stand in a room and know that the dream I want is all in [Combs's] hands."

After seeing her dance, Combs was convinced that O'Day had "Black in her family" and further expressed this sentiment after watching her sing a version of "At Last" at a club during Season 1 of the show. This, along with what viewers saw as natural charisma, helped endear her to become a consistent favorite among judges and fans. Former Backstreet Boys and 'N Sync manager Johnny Wright, who served as one of the judges on the show, stated from her first audition in Los Angeles they knew that she was "a star".

O'Day was eventually chosen to be in the group, and was the first member included. The band became known as Danity Kane, and their first album debuted on August 22, 2006, at #1 on the Billboard 200 charts. The group was the opening act for Christina Aguilera on the U.S. leg of her Back to Basics Tour with the Pussycat Dolls.

In 2007, O'Day recorded the song "Do Yo Dance" with R&B singer Cupid which was the released as a single from Cupid's album Time for a Change.

O'Day's fame and physical features found appealing by magazines helped her broaden her career beyond the group. In addition to other musical projects, she posed for several "sexy" magazine spreads. On the August 28, 2008, episode of Making the Band, due to being consistently frustrated with O'Day's "oversexed" new image, Combs called O'Day "one of the worst dancers" in Danity Kane. He told O'Day that she no longer looked like the girl he signed and that she used to be one of the best. Combs bluntly accused O'Day of trying to expand her fame at the expense of the entire group, and that she liked flaunting her breasts and wearing big hair, referring to an incident where she had rubbed her cleavage on the arm of a television host. He asked himself why he was keeping O'Day in the group.

On the October 7, 2008, episode of Making the Band, after continued debate with O'Day about the well-being of the group, Combs declared O'Day no longer a member of Danity Kane. An official announcement, however, had not been made from Bad Boy Records. When asked by Boston Herald whether she was still in the group, O'Day was reluctant to answer and stated, "I can't comment on anything, I'm sorry."

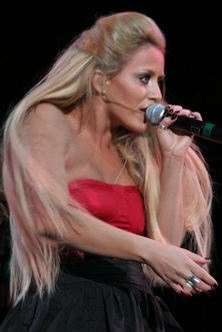
O'Day performing "Damaged" in 2008

Speculation arose that Combs firing O'Day was a ratings ploy and that he had no intention of truly dismissing her. When discussing her career, O'Day would still refer to herself as a "member of a girl band" and "the official party girl of Danity Kane". On the October 14, 2008, episode of Making the Band, however, O'Day's departure from the group was confirmed, as well as bandmate and then-best friend D. Woods. In the live section of the episode, Combs explained that the reason he let O'Day go was that she was not the same person he signed, that the fame had changed her. When O'Day came on to reply, she stated: "I would rather be hated every damn day of my life for being real than loved for being something I'm not." In a backstage interview before the finale, she said:

Tonight is a representation of the end of a chapter in my life; it's not the end of the book. I will do everything possible to make my mark on this industry, and Danity Kane and [Combs] provided me with this amazing opportunity to go out and really touch people's hearts. I think the way that we were able to inspire people was something that I will never be able to achieve in that way again in my life.

MTV News gauged fan reactions to the dismissals of O'Day and Woods. Fans left impassioned, long and detailed comments on the MTV News site about their discontent regarding the group's breakup. The 2009 season of Making the Band was expected to include new members auditioning as "replacements" for O'Day and Woods in Danity Kane, but instead showed the official end of the group. The complete breakup of the group was originally thought to be the result of O'Day and Woods, along with group member Shannon Bex, declining the offer to return to the series and the group. This was later argued by O'Day, who stated that while she was unsure if Woods was asked back, she herself was not asked to return. O'Day said that if offered, she would have returned and is not against returning. She was officially released from her Bad Boy Records contract by Combs in the April 16, 2009, episode of Making the Band.

On the April 23, 2009, finale of the show, O'Day returned with three former members of the group to clear up any misconceptions about the group's breakup. She said that she has forgiven being released from the group, and people who blamed her for the group's demise. Combs said that if he ever puts the group back together, O'Day and the group's other four members would be returning as Danity Kane.

=== 2008–12: Broadway, reality television, and Between Two Evils ===
O'Day began the role of Amber Von Tussle in the Broadway musical Hairspray on July 18, 2008. She appeared in the 2009 comedy American High School costarring Nikki Ziering, and also joined the cast of Jerry Mitchell's musical Peepshow in the role of "Peep Diva" at the Planet Hollywood Resort & Casino in Las Vegas, Nevada from September 2009 to late December 2009. Additionally, O'Day was featured on the Donnie Wahlberg single "I Got It". She recorded a remastered version of Sharam's remix hit "Party All the Time" and released a track titled "Never Fallin".

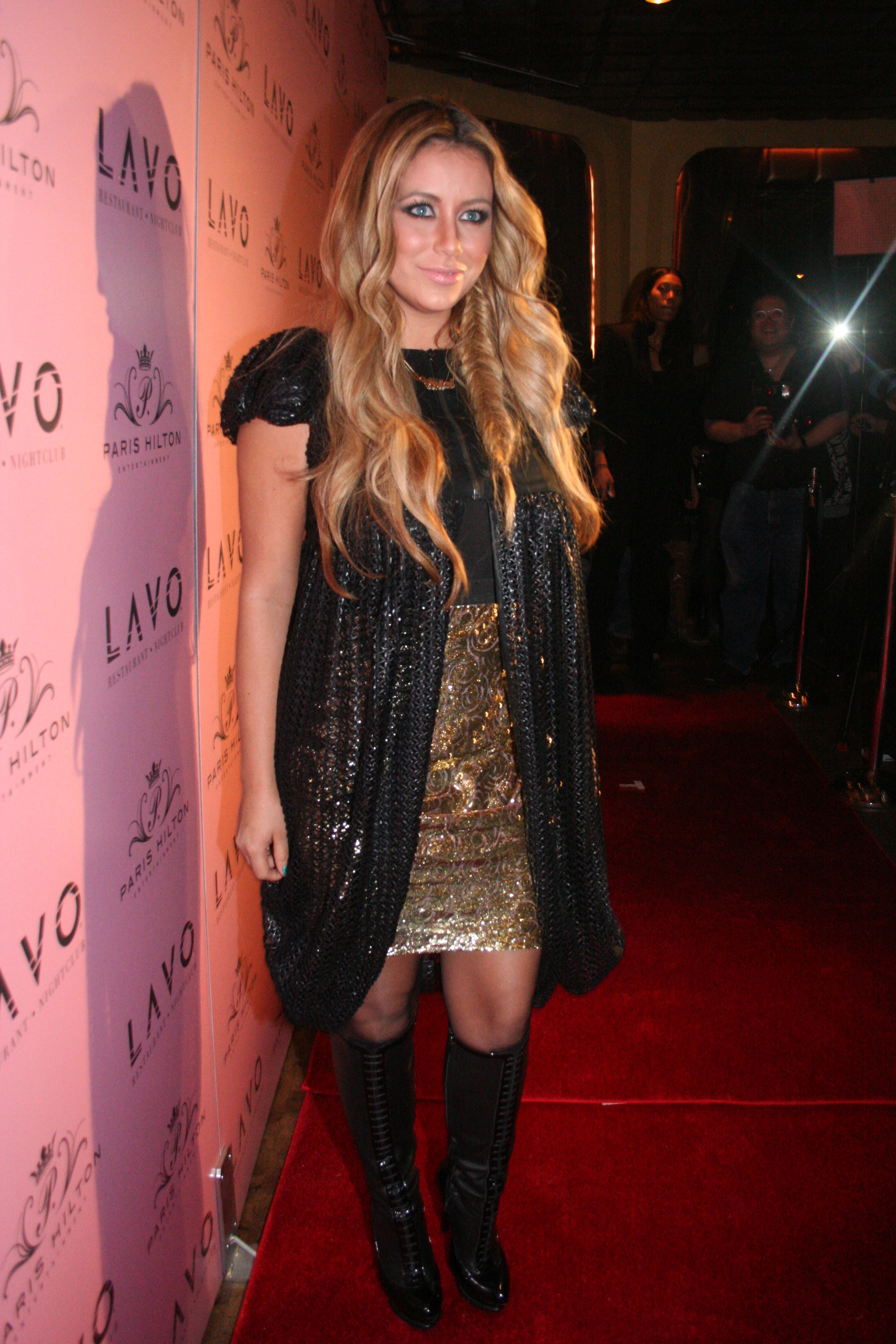
O'Day in February 2011

On the April 23, 2009, finale of Making the Band, O'Day revealed that she would have her own reality television show for which she would be filming in the spring of 2010. The show entitled All About Aubrey premiered on March 7, 2011, on the Oxygen Network. O'Day's debut single, the Adonis-produced "Automatic" was released on April 12, 2011 & has sold 50,000 copies to date hitting the top 20 on iTunes pop charts in less than 2 hours. O'Day recorded over 50 songs for her debut album on SRC/Universal Motown, which was supposed to come out in late 2012.

O'Day was also fired from NBC's The Celebrity Apprentice 5, which premiered on February 19, 2012. Before being fired, O'Day received a significant amount of criticism for her conduct while competing on the show, being described as "narcissistic, self-centered, evil, and vicious" by the media and viewers of the show, and as "transparent" by Trump's judges. It eventually caused Arsenio Hall to lash out on her in the show's boardroom segment, berating her with the unanimous support of his team, particularly Clay Aiken. This left O'Day in tears and contemplating quitting the show before eventually being fired by Trump. O'Day ultimately decided not to quit, but was fired shortly thereafter. Although she accepted an apology from Hall, she has expressed her dislike of him in multiple confessionals, labeling him and Aiken as "bullies". However, the contestants praised her creativity and business skills, and she ended up finishing in 3rd place, being the last female contestant standing. The reason for her firing was that she was too young and inexperienced, and also was seen as transparent by John Rich and Marlee Matlin, who served as Trump's viceroys.

On April 23, 2012, a new self-released single "Wrecking Ball", co-written and co-produced by American Idol alumni Pia Toscano was released on iTunes and sold 3,000 downloads in the first week. She shot a video for the track with music director Rage in June 2012 and was released on September 26, 2012, on Vevo. Also that year, O'Day announced she would be recording her debut solo EP. On December 31, 2012, she performed previously released material, as well as three new songs from her EP Between Two Evils, "Love Me When You Leave", "Let Me Lay" and "Before I Drown" in Las Vegas.

=== 2013–present: Solo career, Danity Kane reunions, Dumblonde, and continued television appearances ===
In 2013, she was a guest judge for episode eight in season five of RuPaul's Drag Race. In June 2013, O'Day performed her singles "Automatic" and "Before I Drown" on The CW's Oh Sit! and also performed at Chicago's Pride Fest. "Between Two Evils" was released on iTunes on August 13, 2013, after topping the iTunes US Dance Chart on pre-order sales alone, and reaching #5 on the iTunes US Pop Chart. In mid-2013, there were rumors that Danity Kane would be reuniting. On August 25, 2013, Danity Kane appeared at the 2013 MTV Video Music Awards (without D. Woods, who did not return to the group), announcing they were back together. They soon split again, and O'Day and Shannon Bex announced the release of the band's third and final album, "DK3".

In early 2015, choosing to continue making music together, O'Day and Bex announced their duo music project, Dumblonde with the same manager as the Danity Kane band, Johnny Wright. In May, O'Day began appearing on We TV's Marriage Boot Camp: Reality Stars with then-boyfriend and singer Travis Garland. In September, Dumblonde released their debut self-entitled album. Within the first two weeks of the album's release, Dumblonde reached Top 20 of Billboard's Top Dance/Electronic Albums, Heatseekers, and Independent Albums charts.

In June 2016, O'Day appeared on E! Network's reality dating series Famously Single for its first season. In August, she competed in the eighteenth series of the British reality show Celebrity Big Brother, where she made it through to the finals, after never facing the public vote and finished in fifth place. In 2018, O'Day returned to Marriage Boot Camp for its thirteenth season, this time with then-boyfriend Pauly D. In March 2019, Dumblonde released their second studio album, "bianca". In July, O'Day was announced as a main cast member on MTV's reality dating series Ex on the Beach for its third season. In August, O'Day, along with Danity Kane members Richard and Bex, announced the DK3 reunion tour entitled "The Universe Is Undefeated", which began September 7.

In February 2021, O'Day began filming for the BET reality series The Encore, which recruited former girl-group members in attempt to form a group and create an album within a month. The show premiered in June the same year; O'Day was the first to leave the group on episode six. On July 7, 2021, O'Day released a single, "Body Love High". On November 21, 2022, O'Day released her single "Couple Goals", which was inspired by her contentious relationship with ex-boyfriend Pauly D. The explicit music video premiered on Onlyfans.

In 2025, O'Day competed on season thirteen of The Masked Singer as "Ant". She made references in her clue packages about being groomed and controlled. O'Day was eliminated in the "Group A Finals: Rat Pack Tribute Night".

== Influences ==
O'Day has cited The Notorious B.I.G., Sean "Puffy" Combs, Lauryn Hill, Janet Jackson and Christina Aguilera as her primary influences growing up.

== Other work ==
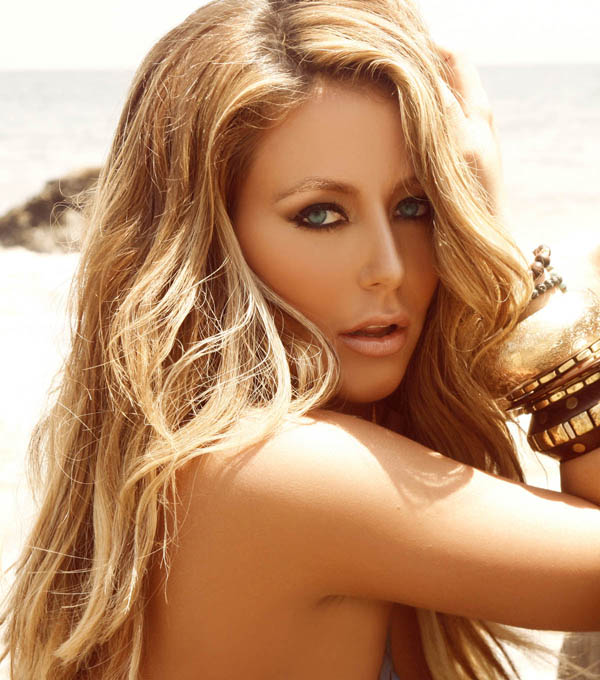
O'Day in 2009

In February 2007, O'Day walked the catwalk of Heatherette's Fall 2007 runway show at Mercedes-Benz Fashion Week held on February 6. In 2008, O'Day briefly became the face of Travis Barker's clothing line Famous Stars and Straps. She also started her own clothing line called Heart on My Sleeve, which features T-shirts and accessories available only online.

In August 2008, she made a cameo appearance in Estelle's music video for "Pretty Please". In October, O'Day ranked #86 on Maxim's Hot 100 list, #81 on Blender's 100 Hottest People list, and posed for the magazines. She posed topless in the November 2008 issue of men's magazine Complex. She later agreed to be the covergirl for Playboy for the March 2009 issue. Additionally, she has been featured on the covers of Jadore, Image, Palm Springs Life, King, Right On!, Dub and Envy. She has done features for GQ, In Touch Weekly and Us Weekly. In late 2008, O'Day made a guest appearance on the reality show 50 Cent: The Money and the Power.

== Personal life ==
During the 2008 presidential election campaign in the United States, O'Day supported Barack Obama for President.

=== Relationships ===
On August 12, 2008, during an appearance on The Wendy Williams Show, O'Day stated that she previously dated DJ Cassidy. In 2019, O'Day alleged that from 2011–2012 she had an affair with then-married Donald Trump Jr., whom she met in late 2011 when she filmed The Celebrity Apprentice, saying that they thought of themselves as soulmates at the time. Her song "DJT", from her 2013 album Between Two Evils, is highly speculated to be about her relationship with Trump. O'Day met DJ Pauly D in 2015 when the two participated on Famously Single. They continued their relationship after filming and confirmed they were dating in February 2016. After breaking up in July 2017, O'Day was celibate for three years, and during that time, disappeared from the public eye while she lived in Bali. Due to the toxicity of the relationship, O'Day did not date for five years, first joining Hinge in 2022.

==== P. Diddy ====
In 2025, while involved in a Netflix documentary about Combs, O'Day alleged that he pursued her after her appearance on Making the Band, describing his behavior as "predatory". She shared an email from Combs where he detailed wanting to orchestrate a sexual experience between O'Day and "some motherfucker". She claimed to decline Combs' sexual advances, which she believes is why she was fired from Danity Kane in 2008. Additionally, an affidavit from an anonymous third party claimed that O'Day was sexually assaulted by Combs and another man in 2005, while at Bad Boy Records' studios in Manhattan.

=== Sexuality ===
In an August 2008 interview with Broadway.com, she said she was increasingly irritated with people pigeonholing her sexuality, stating that she looks for "incredible passion and honest love" and not at gender. When questioned by Us Weekly regarding rumors that she is a lesbian, O'Day did not confirm nor deny the speculation about her sexuality, and once again said that she could not say "one way or another" what her sexual orientation is at this point in her life. In 2019, she came out as sapiosexual. In 2009, while on the show Chelsea Lately, when asked about being bisexual, she replied, "Generally, I don't like to label myself... I want to find someone I'm passionate about, and I don't want to limit myself to one segment of the population."

=== Activism ===
She worked with service organizations while touring in different countries, as well as refugee centers, orphanages, and mostly with children with AIDS. She volunteered for The Pink Project (a charity photobook supporting RAINN and the Los Angeles Breast Cancer Alliance), and helped victims of the Hurricane Katrina devastation. O'Day soon created her own organization, called F*A*N (Fighting Aids Now). The charity's goal is to give therapy and art to children in hospitals. She is also a supporter of LGBT rights and chose GLSEN as her charity for Celebrity Apprentice.

== Filmography and theatre ==
=== Television ===
Year	Show	Note
2005–2006	Making the Band 3	Herself – Winner (28 episodes)
2007–2009	Making the Band 4	Herself (20 episodes)
2009	The Aubrey O'Day Show	Herself
2009	American High School	Hilary Weiss
2011	All About Aubrey	Herself
2012	The Celebrity Apprentice 5	Contestant – 3rd Place
2013	RuPaul's Drag Race	Guest Judge (3 episodes)
2013	Total Blackout	Herself (1 episode)
2014	E!'s Worst Thing I Ever Posted	Herself
2014	E!'s Worst Thing I Ever Bought	Herself
2014	E!'s Worst Thing I Ever Wore	Herself
2014–2015	Fashion News Live	Herself (14 episodes)
2015	Dance Moms	Herself (4 episodes)
2015	Marriage Bootcamp: Reality Stars 3	Herself (12 episodes)
2015	Todrick	Herself
2016	Famously Single	Herself (8 episodes)
2016	Celebrity Big Brother 18	Housemate – 5th place
2018	Marriage Bootcamp: Reality Stars 11	Herself
2019	Ex on the Beach 3	Herself
2021	BET Presents: The Encore	Herself
2024	Baddies Caribbean	Herself
2025	The Masked Singer	Ant

=== Theatre ===
Year	Title	Role	Details
2008	Hairspray	Amber Von Tussle	Broadway, Neil Simon Theatre

== Discography ==
=== Extended plays ===
List of extended plays, with selected chart positions
Title	Album details	Peak chart positions			Sales
Title	Album details	US	US Heat.	US Independent	Sales
Between Two Evils	Released: August 13, 2013; Label: Heart on My Sleeve, Inc.; Formats: digital download	131	3	25	US: 15,000

=== Singles ===
==== As lead artist ====
Year	Title	Peak chart positions	Album
Year	Title	US Heat.	Album
2011	"Automatic"	25	non-album singles
2012	"Wrecking Ball"	—	non-album singles
2021	"Body Love High"	—	non-album singles
2022	"Emface Nation Theme"	—	non-album singles
2022	"Couple Goals"	—	non-album singles

==== As featured artist ====
Title	Year	Album
"Do Your Dance" (Cupid featuring Aubrey O'Day)	2007	Time for a Change
"Take You There (Part 2)" (Donnie Klang featuring Aubrey O'Day)	2010	Just a Rolling Stone
"I Got It" (Donnie Wahlberg featuring Aubrey O'Day)	2010	non-album single
"Stamina" (Todrick Hall featuring Aubrey O'Day)	2023	Jim

== Music videos ==
Year	Title	Director
2012	"Wrecking Ball"	Rage
