= Between Two Evils =

EP by Aubrey O'Day
- Released: August 13, 2013
- Recorded: 2012–2013
- Genre: R&B
- Length: 32:33
- Label: Heart on My Sleeve, Inc.
- Producer: Z Musik, Jaiden The Cure, Freshman III

Between Two Evils is the debut extended play (EP) by American singer and Danity Kane member Aubrey O'Day. It was released on August 13, 2013.

The track "DJT" is believed to be about O'Day's affair with Donald Trump Jr. In 2013, O'Day stated that "DJT" was based on a real conversation and was named for the man she wrote the album about.

== Commercial performance ==
The album debuted at number 131 on the Billboard 200 chart, with first-week sales of 5,000 copies in the United States. The album also peaked at number three on the Billboard Heatseekers chart and number twenty-five on the Billboard Independent Albums chart.

== Track listing ==
No.	Title	Length
1.	"DJT"	3:04
2.	"Unchoose You"	4:16
3.	"Love Me When You Leave"	4:16
4.	"Let Me Lay"	4:07
5.	"Hurts So Good"	4:03
6.	"Before I Drown"	3:46
7.	"Second Call"	3:27
8.	"Devil & Me"	3:44
9.	"Outro"	1:43
Total length:		32:33

== Charts ==
Chart (2013)	Peak position
U.S. Billboard 200	131
U.S. Billboard Heatseekers	3
U.S. Billboard Independent Albums	25
