= Take the Stage =

- Genre: Reality television
- Created by: Dianne Victor
- Directed by: Joshua David Evans
- Starring: Johnny Wright; Rodney "Darkchild" Jerkins
- Country of origin: United States
- Original language: English
- No. of episodes: 18

Production
- Producer: YOBI.tv

Original release
- Release: June 5 – October 7, 2012

Take The Stage is a non-scripted singing competition starring Johnny Wright and Rodney "Darkchild" Jerkins, and produced by YOBI.tv.

Take The Stage has been likened to shows such as American Idol, The Voice, and X Factor in that the contestants are put through a variety of challenges to see who has what it takes to be the next musical sensation. It has also, however, been noted as different from these shows for its non-reliance on professional or celebrity judges and the absence of progressive eliminations, as well as for its focus on original music.

The winner of Take The Stage will be determined solely by viewer votes and will get $20,000 and a music management contract with Johnny Wright and YOBI.tv. Take The Stage was seen on YOBI.tv and on Myspace.

== Stars and Guest Stars ==
Take The Stage stars a number of music industry, media, and visual arts experts.

- Johnny Wright - Music Manager
- Rodney "Darkchild" Jerkins - Songwriter and Producer
- Michael McCoy - Program Director, Clear Channel Communications
- Adrienne Williams - Marketing Manager, Live Nation
- LeeAundra Keany - Professional Media Trainer, Keany Communications
- Abrey Adams Watterson - Professional Photographer
- Tim Smith - Recording, Mixing Engineer - The Soundscape Recording Studio

== Featured Musicians ==
The nine musicians featured on Take The Stage earned their way onto the show by winning the YOBI.tv Season 4 YOBISing contest.

- Ashlyn Metheny
- Brooklynn Jayde
- Gabrielle Taryn
- Katelyn Krapf
- Luke James
- Marquisa DeShawn
- Mykell
- Teri "Lyric" Green
- Tyler Howe

== Production ==
Take The Stage was filmed in late March and early June 2012 at a number of locations around the Detroit metropolitan area.

== Episodes ==
Episode titles, descriptions, and release dates are from the Take The Stage IMDb page.

Episode 1 - Meet the Finalists. Release date, 5 June 2012

Episode 2 - Fitness 101 Challenge. Release date, 12 June 2012

Episode 3 - Here's Johnny! Release date, 19 June 2012

Episode 4 - Wright Moves. Release date, 26 June 2012

Episode 5 - Star Spangled. Release date, 3 July 2012

Episode 6 - Style and Image Challenge. Release date, 10 July 2012

Episode 7 - Sell It ~ Record Producer Meeting. Release date, 17 July 2012

Episode 8 - Jingles ~ Overnight Challenge. Release date, 24 July 2012

Episode 9 - Strike a Pose. Release date, 31 July 2012

Episode 10 - Radio Ready Challenge. Release date, 7 August 2012

Episode 11 - Sold Out!. Release date, 14 August 2012

Episode 12 - Meet the Press. Release date, 21 August 2012

Episode 13 - Live, from the Green Tile! Release date, 28 August 2012

Episode 14 - Rodney "Darkchild" Jerkins Original Song Challenge ~ Part One. Release date, 4 September 2012

Episode 15 - Rodney "Darkchild" Jerkins Original Song Challenge ~ Part Two. Release date, 11 September 2012

Episode 16 - Dress Rehearsal. Release date, 18 September 2012

Episode 17 - Final Performances. Release date, 25 September 2012

Episode 18 - Live Results Finale. Release date, 7 October 2012

== Original songs ==
Each Take The Stage artist has five original songs on the official series websites.

== Results and Prizes ==
The series finale was broadcast live via Ustream on October 7, 2012. The show featured Johnny Wright and all nine of the Take The Stage artists, as well as special guest Rodney "Darkchild" Jerkins. Those results and the prizes won by each artist are as follows:

First Place - Katelyn Krapf
$20,000 and a music management contract with Johnny Wright's Wright Entertainment Group and YOBI.tv

Second Place - Gabrielle Taryn
$8,000 and "Scars" (a collaboration with Teri "Lyric" Green) will be shopped around to record labels

Third Place - Luke James
$7,000 and studio time with Rodney "Darkchild" Jerkins

Fourth Place - Teri "Lyric" Green
$5,000 and Scars" (a collaboration with Gabrielle Taryn) will be shopped around to record labels

Fifth Place - Ashlyn Metheny
$4,000

Sixth Place - Mykell
$3,000

Seventh Place - Brooklynn Jayde
$2,000

Eighth Place - Tyler Howe
$2,000

Ninth Place - Marquisa DeShawn
$2,000
