= All About Aubrey =

- Starring: Aubrey O'Day; Stephanie Spiropoulos; DJ Eque; Johnny Wright; Gil; Adonis Shropshire; Tiffany Palladine; Krystal Bronson
- Opening theme: "Automatic" performed by Aubrey O'Day
- No. of seasons: 1
- No. of episodes: 6

Production
- Executive producers: Michael Hirschorn; Madison Merritt; Wendy Roth; Perry Dance; Ted Iredell
- Production company: Ish Entertainment

Original release
- Network: Oxygen
- Release: March 7 – April 11, 2011

All About Aubrey is a reality television series from Oxygen that premiered on March 7, 2011. The show follows pop star Aubrey O'Day as she mounts a solo comeback after being fired from multi-platinum girl group Danity Kane by Sean Combs on MTV's Making the Band. The show was not renewed for a second season due to low ratings.

== Cast ==
- Aubrey O'Day – a multi-platinum singer, dancer, actress, songwriter, and former member of the girl group Danity Kane.
- Stephanie Spiropoulos – one of Aubrey's childhood best friends.
- Tiffany Palladine – Aubrey's best friend since the 5th grade.
- Krystal Bronson – Aubrey's roommate and assistant.
- DJ Eque – Aubrey's friend and a celebrity DJ.
- Johnny Wright – Aubrey's manager. Johnny has helped build the careers of stars such as Justin Timberlake, Britney Spears and the Jonas Brothers.
- Adonis Shropshire – Aubrey's record producer.
- Gil – Aubrey's choreographer.

== Episodes ==
No.	Title	Original release date	U.S. viewers (millions)
1	"Brand New O'Day"	March 7, 2011	0.72
2	"Fans and Foes"	March 14, 2011	N/A
3	"Aubrey vs. Perez"	March 21, 2011	N/A
Guest Star: Perez Hilton
4	"Single White Roommate"	March 28, 2011	0.55
5	"Goodbye Heartbreak"	April 4, 2011	N/A
Guest Star: Russell Simmons
6	"Show Stoppin' Solo"	April 11, 2011	N/A
Guest Star: Aundrea Fimbres
