= Johnny Wright (music manager) =

American music manager (born 1960)

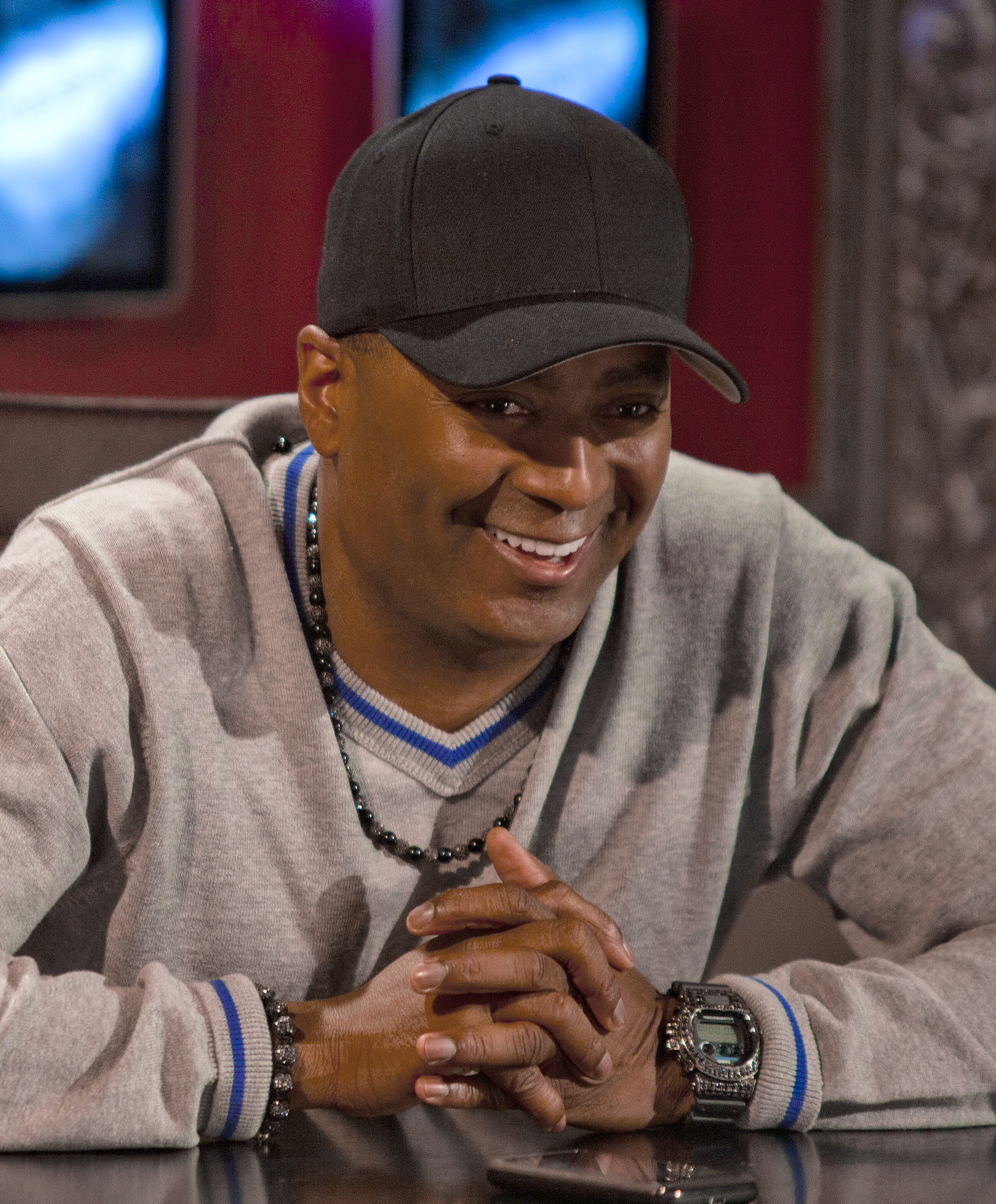

Background information
- Born: August 17, 1960 (age 65); Hyannis, Massachusetts, U.S.
- Occupations: Record executive; talent agent; television producer; entrepreneur
- Years active: 1993–present

Johnny Wright (born August 17, 1960) is an American talent agent and media proprietor. He has managed groups including New Kids on the Block, the Backstreet Boys, *NSYNC, the Jonas Brothers, Menudo, Triple Image, and solo acts such as Janet Jackson, Justin Timberlake, Britney Spears, Stevie Brock, and Ciara. In 2022, he formed the boy band NoLonelyHearts.

== Early life ==
Wright was born in Hyannis, Massachusetts and grew up on Cape Cod. While working in radio, he befriended Maurice Starr, who went on to discover New Edition. In 1988, when Starr was managing group New Kids on the Block, Starr hired Wright as a driver for the band, and Wright became the group's road manager for four years.

== Career ==
In the early 1990s, Wright relocated to Orlando and began working as a manager for the Backstreet Boys, a vocal group put together by Lou Pearlman. To help break the group, Wright decided the Boys should first develop their act in continental Europe before making an American debut. The band achieved success in pop music-friendly Europe, eventually breaking through internationally and selling 30 million copies worldwide of their second album Backstreet Boys. While the Backstreet Boys were establishing themselves in Europe, Pearlman signed another vocal group gaining buzz in Orlando, NSYNC, at Wright's suggestion. NSYNC, duplicating Wright's European strategy, would go on to match Backstreet Boys' success with their debut record reaching the number 2 position on the Billboard 200 chart. In September 1998, the Backstreet Boys parted ways with Wright, but later re-signed with him in 2004.

Wright managed Britney Spears from 1998 to 2003. He became the manager for Justin Timberlake's solo career in 2002.

During 2000, Wright's management roster included eleven acts.

=== 2000–2010 ===
In 2003, he appeared as a judge on the NBC talent/reality show, Fame, hosted by one of his own managed talents, Joey Fatone of *NSYNC.

In 2004, Wright teamed up with Sean "Diddy" Combs for the third season of Making the Band. After an unsuccessful first attempt, band Danity Kane was finally chosen in 2005. Wright served as the group's (which included singer Shannon Bex, whom he met on Fame) manager. In 2008, he quit managing Danity Kane via text message.

In 2007, Wright was selected to be the manager of the new version of the Latino boy band Menudo. The new group would be a fusion of urban, pop and rock music in English and Spanish under the label of Sony BMG and Epic Records. Several auditions were held in different cities such as Los Angeles, Dallas, Miami, New York, among others. In New York, 15 youngsters were selected from 25 contestants during a one-week mini-competition: José Monti Montañez, JC Gonzalez, Carlos Pena, Jr., Anthony, Carlos Olivero, Chris Moy, Dennis, Eric, Hansel, Henry, Jorge Jorge, Jorge Negron, José Bordonada, José Monti Montañez, Thomas and Trevor. Wright, along with choreographer Anibal Marrero and voice coach David Coury, met with the 15 semifinalists in South Beach, Florida to continue the band's development, a process that was documented through a reality show on MTV called Making Menudo.

In 2009, Wright announced the formation of a new boy band group, which was ultimately named One Call. The group consisted of two former members of Menudo, Chris Moy and José Bordonada Collazo; former member of NLT, Justin Thorne; and newcomer Anthony Gamlieli.

=== 2011–2012 ===
Wright was also the manager of Aubrey O'Day of Danity Kane and was featured on the Oxygen docu-reality series All About Aubrey.

In 2011, Wright partnered with AT&T and Cambio to create a new web-reality show series called On the Spot: Johnny Wright's Quest to Form the Next Supergroup.

==== Web reality series: On the Spot (2011) ====
Wright joined the web reality series On the Spot on the Cambio website in 2011. The show documented the talent community's search of participants all over the world to form the next supergroup. The competition was narrowed to 20 participants, who were then placed in a series of challenges that tested each contestant's artistic prowess, business savvy, and passion. The winners of the competition would be flown to LA to participate in Wright's famous “Boot Camp”, an intense workshop of rehearsals, dance choreography, vocal lessons, and media training.

==== Web series: Take the Stage (2012) ====
In 2012, Wright starred in the YOBI.tv singing competition web series Take The Stage. Along with Rodney "Darkchild" Jerkins and a number of other music and media industry professionals, Wright mentored and challenged contestants Katelyn, Mykell, Brooklynn, Marquisa, Tyler, Gabrielle, Lyric, Ashlynn, and Luke, to see who had what it took to be the next breakout star. The winner of Take The Stage won $20,000 and a management contract with Wright Entertainment Group and YOBI.tv.

In 2012, Wright took on a new Orlando-based group, known as 89, and helped them launch their first single, "Give Me Some More (GMSM)", and its accompanying music video. During this year, he also signed British singer-songwriter Luke Potter.

=== 2013–present ===
In August 2014 Wright began to handle the career of Indonesian singer Agnez Mo to help her break the US music market.

In early 2015, Johnny Wright managed Dumblonde, the new music duo consisting of former Danity Kane members Aubrey O' Day and Shannon Bex.

Wright is currently president/CEO of the Wright Entertainment Group (WEG). In 2015, he was included in the annual Billboard Power 100 list as No. 83. The Wright Entertainment Group (WEG) management roster includes Justin Timberlake, 98 Degrees, AJ McLean, Asher Angel, and Incubus.

== Personal life ==
Wright was previously married to Donna Wright. From 2001 to 2016, Wright was married to Erika Schwarz, a sports agent, attorney and first runner-up for the 1997 Miss America pageant.
