= Cupid Shuffle =

Single by Cupid

from the album Time for a Change
- Released: February 13, 2007
- Genre: Dance; hip hop
- Length: 3:50
- Label: Asylum Atlantic
- Songwriter: Cupid
- Producer: Cupid

Cupid singles chronology
"Say Yes" (2007)	"Cupid Shuffle" (2007)	"Happy Dance" (2008)

"Cupid Shuffle" is a song by Cupid from his 2007 studio album Time for a Change. It has spawned a popular line dance and has drawn comparisons to DJ Casper's "Cha Cha Slide".

In the United States, the song peaked at number 66 on the Billboard Hot 100 and number 19 on the Hot R&B/Hip-Hop Songs the chart, both in the August 18, 2007 issue.

== The Voice ==
In 2012, Cupid chose the song for his audition to the third season of the American music competition show The Voice, broadcast on NBC. Although he gave a different version of the hit, none of the four judges pressed their "I Want You" button and he was automatically eliminated from further competition in the show. But after turning their chairs, judge CeeLo Green recognized Cupid and asked him to perform another song to prove that "he can sing".

== In popular culture ==
- The song and dance are featured in a scene at the end of the film Jumping the Broom.
- In Week 5 of the 2008 NFL season, three Miami Dolphins, including running back Ronnie Brown, used the "Cupid Shuffle" dance as a celebratory dance after scoring a touchdown against the San Diego Chargers. The three were later fined as the celebration was deemed premeditated.
- This song appears in Dance Central 3.
- This song was used in the Philippine talent search Protégé: The Battle for the Big Artista Break in 2012.
- The song appears in the opening scene of season six, episode 16 of New Girl.
- The song appears in a party scene in season one, episode three of Ginny and Georgia.

== Charts and certifications ==
=== Weekly charts ===
Chart (2007)	Peak position
US Billboard Hot 100	66
US Hot R&B/Hip-Hop Songs (Billboard)	19
US Pop 100 (Billboard)	86
US Rhythmic Airplay (Billboard)	35

=== Year-end charts ===
Chart (2007)	Position
US Hot R&B/Hip-Hop Songs (Billboard)	74

=== Certifications ===
Region	Certification	Certified units/sales
United States (RIAA)	5× Platinum	5,000,000^{‡}
^{‡} Sales+streaming figures based on certification alone.
