= Mel Waiters =

American singer (1956–2015)

Mel Waiters (June 25, 1956 – May 28, 2015) was an American southern soul singer born and raised in San Antonio, Texas. In the early 1970s, he began singing in the church choir and nightclubs. Additionally, he was a radio DJ and entertainer on military bases around this time. In the mid-1990s, he achieved national fame with his first single "Hit It and Quit It." He gave the only copy of his new CD, the soon-to-be Got My Whiskey, to Tommy Couch Jr. at Malaco Records in Jackson, Mississippi, and was subsequently brought onto the label.

Waiters became popular on the blues festival and touring circuit in the South, and was known for songs about partying and romance. In 1999, his fourth album Material Things made it to the Billboard Top R&B/Hip-Hop Albums chart. He claimed that Teddy Pendergrass was the main influence on his singing style. Waiters was featured in a cover story of the February 2007 issue of Living Blues magazine.

Waiters died of cancer on May 28, 2015.
