= Cupid (singer) =

American rapper from Louisiana

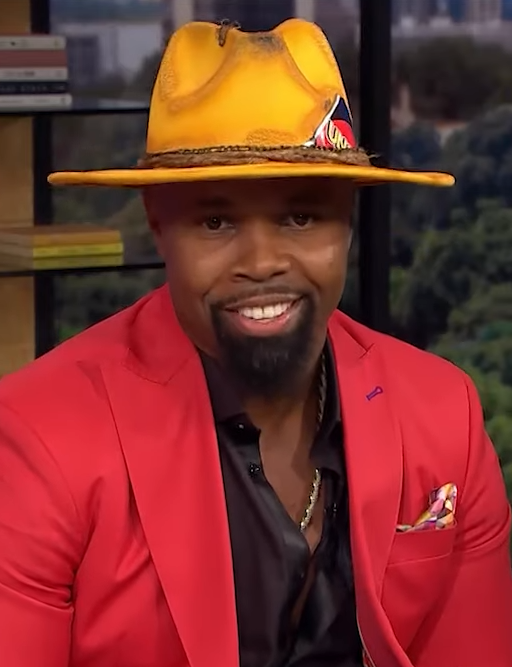
- Bernard in 2020

Background information
- Born: Bryson Bernard; October 10, 1982 (age 44); Lafayette, Louisiana, U.S.
- Genre: R&B
- Occupations: Singer, rapper, songwriter
- Years active: 2000–present
- Labels: Atlantic, Asylum
- Website: https://newcupidonline.com/

Bryson Bernard (born October 10, 1982) better known by his stage name Cupid, is an American singer and songwriter from Lafayette, Louisiana. He is best known for the 2007 line dance single "Cupid Shuffle", which peaked at number 68 on the Billboard Hot 100.

== History ==
Bernard started singing in his church's choir, encouraged by his pastor father. He initially enrolled at the University of Louisiana at Lafayette with a full athletic scholarship in track and field. He left the track team to form a singing group known as Fasho, which later changed its name to Fifth Element. After Fifth Element was dissolved, Bernard pursued a solo career. He sang at venues such as talent shows, weddings and funerals. With a five-octave vocal range, Bernard earned the nickname "Cupid" for an impressive performance of the late-1990s 112 hit single "Cupid".

== Music career ==
=== 2001–2005: Independent roots and birth of Swingout ===
Cupid's music career began with the release of Are You Ready in 2001, followed by his 2003 self-titled album, Cupid, which featured local hits like "Do Ya Thang" and a remix with New Orleans rapper Hotboy Ronald. These early projects blended smooth R&B with regional bounce and helped establish his name across Louisiana and the Gulf Coast.

In 2005, he released 2 Sides to Every Story, an experimental project that merged classic soul with fresh energy—setting the foundation for what he would later coin as Swingout music. Tracks like "Swing Around the Rosey" became local dance staples. That same year, he dropped The King of Down South R&B, with Southern Soul bangers such as "At the BBQ", which was later covered by Mel Waiters.

=== 2006–2009: "Cupid Shuffle" and mainstream breakthrough ===
In 2006, Cupid began performing and touring within the Southern Soul circuit, sharing stages with established blues artists such as Mel Waiters, Marvin Sease, and Big Cynthia. That same year, in August 2006, he wrote and recorded "Cupid Shuffle", a line dance track that quickly gained popularity in clubs and dance halls across the Southern United States.

The song's viral rise led to a major deal with Atlantic Records in 2007. His major-label debut, Time for a Change, included features from T-Pain, B.o.B., and Aubrey O’Day. "Cupid Shuffle", the first single from the album, peaked at No. 66 on the Billboard Hot 100 and No. 21 on the Billboard Hot R&B/Hip-Hop Songs chart. It went on to become a double-platinum cultural phenomenon—played at weddings, school dances, and sporting events worldwide.

In 2008, Cupid set a Guinness World Record for the largest line dance, with over 17,000 participants in Atlanta, Georgia at Ebony's Black Family Reunion Tour. Despite the success of "Cupid Shuffle", Atlantic Records faced challenges marketing line dance culture to a broader commercial audience, and Cupid was released from the label in 2009.

=== 2010–2017: Independent work and personal challenges ===
Following his departure from Atlantic Records, Cupid continued to pursue his career independently. In 2010, he partnered with McDonald's to release the "McCafé Shuffle", leveraging brand collaborations to expand the reach of his music. In 2012, he appeared on Season 3 of The Voice on NBC, though producers asked him to perform "Cupid Shuffle" rather than the original song he preferred. None of the four judges—Adam Levine, Cee Lo Green, Christina Aguilera, or Blake Shelton—turned their chairs. Cupid later revealed that the experience was emotionally difficult, a story he explores in his 2023 book Trust Your Gift.

During this period, he released Feel Good Music (2012), Positopia (2013), Dance Fever (2015), and Dance Party King (2016), continuing to build his catalog and inspire dancers worldwide.

In 2017, Cupid suffered a stroke that temporarily impaired his speech. The experience deepened his spiritual connection to music and reshaped his outlook on life and artistry.

=== 2018–present: Resurgence, legacy, and global reach ===
Cupid returned to music with the release of Capricorn in 2018, followed by a partnership with Walmart for the "Walmart Shuffle" in 2019. He followed up with Capricorn 2 in 2021, featuring tracks like "Flex", which garnered significant attention in the Southern Soul and line dance scenes.

In 2024, Cupid embarked on his first international tour, performing in countries including Kuwait, Qatar, Bahrain, Saudi Arabia, and Djibouti. In 2025, he launched his independent label, TOC (The Official Cupid), signed a distribution deal with Sparta Distribution, and partnered with After Dark Digital for public relations and digital marketing. These moves marked a new phase of global reach and artistic independence, reaffirming his role as a key figure in dance music and Southern Soul.

== Discography ==
=== Albums ===
- Cupid (2002)
- The King of Down South R&B (2005)
- Time for a Change (2007)
- Feel Good Music (2012)
- Positopia (2013)
- Dance Party King (2016)
- Capricorn (2018)

=== Singles ===
- "Do Ya Thing" (2001)
- "Do Yo Dance" (2007)
- "Say Yes" (2007)
- "Cupid Shuffle" (2007)
- "Happy Dance" (2008)
- "Love Slide" (2008)
- "Do My Ladies Run This Party" (2010)
- “Dance Fever”
- ”I Killed Lil Saint” (2013)
- "FLEX" (2020)
- "Bus Stop Please" (2024)
- "Dance in Yo Chair" (2024)
- "Pop That Fan" (2024)

=== Album appearances ===
- "All I Need" – Nancy Drew soundtrack
- "369" (featuring B.o.B) – Step Up 2: The Streets (soundtrack)

== Filmography ==
- The Voice (2012)
