= Time for a Change (album) =

Studio album by Cupid
- Released: September 11, 2007
- Recorded: 2006–2007
- Genre: R&B
- Label: Asylum; Atlantic

Cupid chronology
The King of Down South R&B (2005)	Time for a Change (2007)	Feel Good Music (2012)

Singles from Time for a Change
- 1. "Do Ya Dance" Released: 2007; 2. "Say Yes" Released: 2007; 3. "Cupid Shuffle" Released: February 13, 2007

Professional ratings
Review scores
Source	Rating
Allmusic	3/5 stars

Time for a Change is the third studio album by R&B singer Cupid. The album is known for its single, "Cupid Shuffle", which peaked at #66 on the Billboard Hot 100 and #19 on the Hot R&B/Hip Hop Songs chart. The album peaked at #9 on the R&B chart and #58 on the Billboard 200.

== Track listing ==
1. "Work" (Produced by K. Shelton a.k.a. Severe Garcia & S. Turner a.k.a. Black Vegah for Family Biz Ent.) - 3:21
2. "Closer" - 3:30
3. "Do Yo Dance" (Prod. By P-NO The Matrikks)(featuring Cristal) - 3:30
4. "The Let Out" (featuring Tay Dizm) - 3:33
5. "Cupid Shuffle" - 3:51
6. "3-6-9" (featuring B.o.B) - ( written by T.Thomas, James Werner, Larry Werner & Lincoln Chase ) - 3:32
7. "Spin The Bottle" (featuring Shorty Da Kid) - 4:05
8. "Someone Like You" - 3:33
9. "Say Yes" - 3:30
10. "Don't Love Her to Death" - ( Written by B. Berand, Brandon Nezey & Bryson Bernard ) - 4:58
11. "Cupid Shot You" Written by Andre Merritt (produced by Stereotypes) - 3:45
12. "I Love Me" (featuring Foxx) - 4:18
