= Day26 discography =

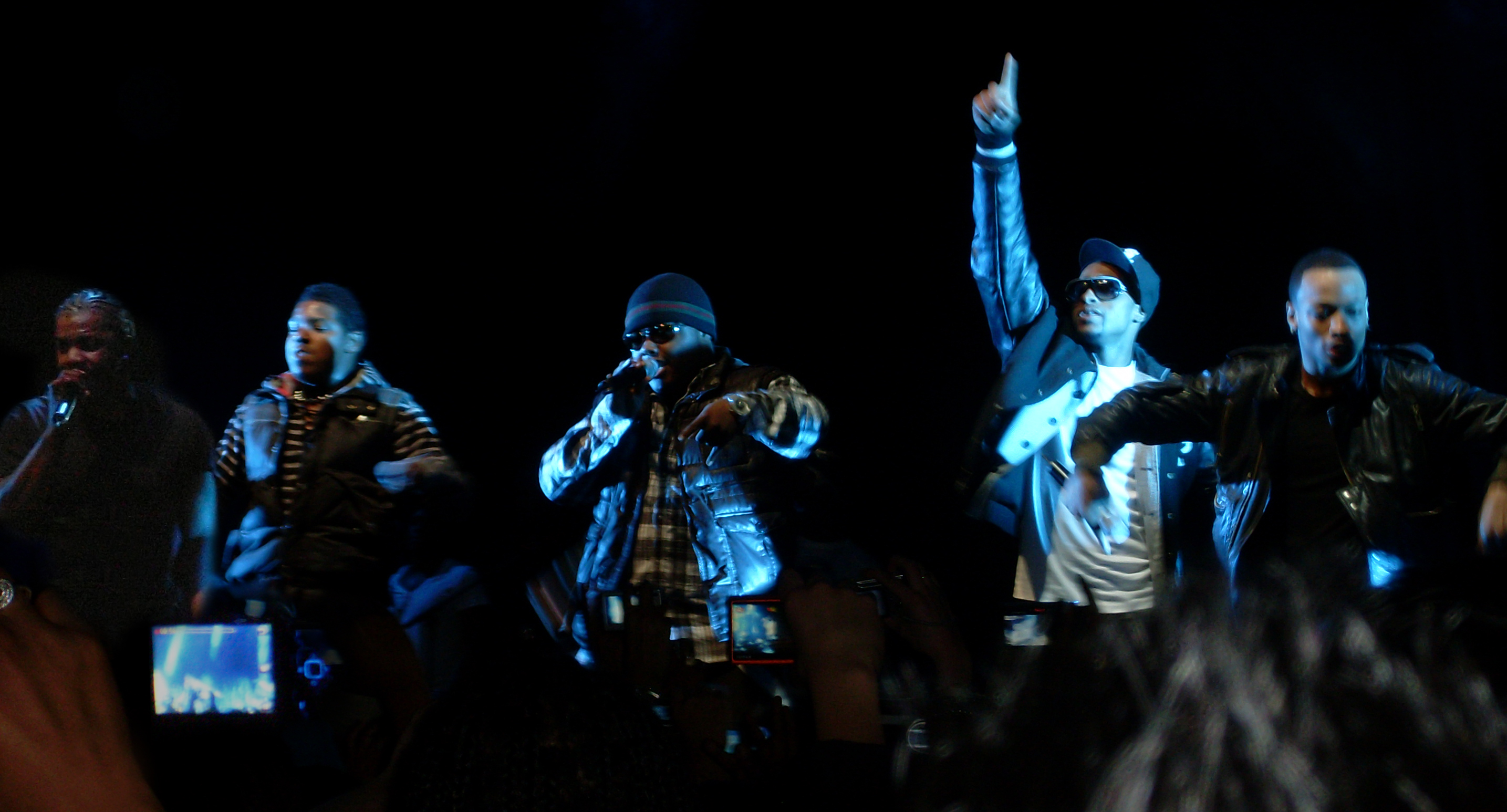
- Day26 in 2009.
- Studio albums: 3
- EPs: 2
- Singles: 10

American boy band Day26 has released three studio albums and two extended plays.

== Studio albums ==
List of albums, with selected chart positions and certifications
Title	Details	Peak chart positions	
Title	Details	US	US R&B
Day26	Released: March 25, 2008; Label: Bad Boy, Atlantic; Formats: CD, digital download	1	1
Forever in a Day	Released: April 14, 2009; Label: Bad Boy, Atlantic; Formats: CD, digital download	2	1
Day Ones	Released: August 26, 2024; Label: ByUs; Formats: Digital download	—	—

== Extended plays ==
List of extended plays, with selected details
Title	Details
The Return	Released: June 26, 2014; Label: Day26, BMG; Formats: Digital download
A New Day	Released: October 3, 2018; Label: 826 Boyz; Formats: Digital download

== Singles ==
List of singles, with selected chart positions
Title	Year	Peak chart positions		Album
Title	Year	US	US R&B	Album
"Got Me Going"	2008	79	30	Day26
"Since You've Been Gone"	2008	—	52	Day26
"This Christmas"	2008	—	—	Non-album single
"Imma Put It on Her" (featuring Diddy & Yung Joc)	2009	79	29	Forever in a Day
"So Good"	2009	—	76	Forever in a Day
"Let It Go"	2011	—	—	Non-album singles
"Made Love Lately"	2011	—	75	Non-album singles
"Bullshit"	2014	—	—	The Return
"4 Shots"	2017	—	—	A New Day
"All I Want"	2018	—	—	A New Day
"—" denotes releases that did not chart or were not released in that territory.

=== Promotional singles ===
List of other charted songs, with selected chart positions
Title	Year	Peak	Album
Title	Year	US Bub.	Album
"Exclusive (No Excuses)"	2008	23	Day26
"Stadium Music"	2009	—	Forever in a Day

== Video albums ==
List of video albums, with selected details
Title	Details
Forever in Your Eyes	Released: April 14, 2009; Label: Bad Boy, Atlantic; Formats: Digital download

== Music videos ==
List of music videos
Title	Year	Director(s)
"Got Me Going"	2008	Syndrome
"Since You’ve Been Gone"	2008	Erik White
"Imma Put It on Her"	2009	Rage
"So Good"	2009	—N/a
"Stadium Music"	2009	—N/a
"Girlfriend"	2009	—N/a
"Then There’s You"	2009	—N/a
"Truth Is a Lie"	2009	—N/a
"Just Getting Started"	2009	—N/a
"Perfectly Blind"	2009	—N/a
"Made Love Lately"	2012	Sequoia

Preceded by Danity Kane	Making the Band winners 2007	Most recent
