= Junior's =

American restaurant

Junior's Restaurant

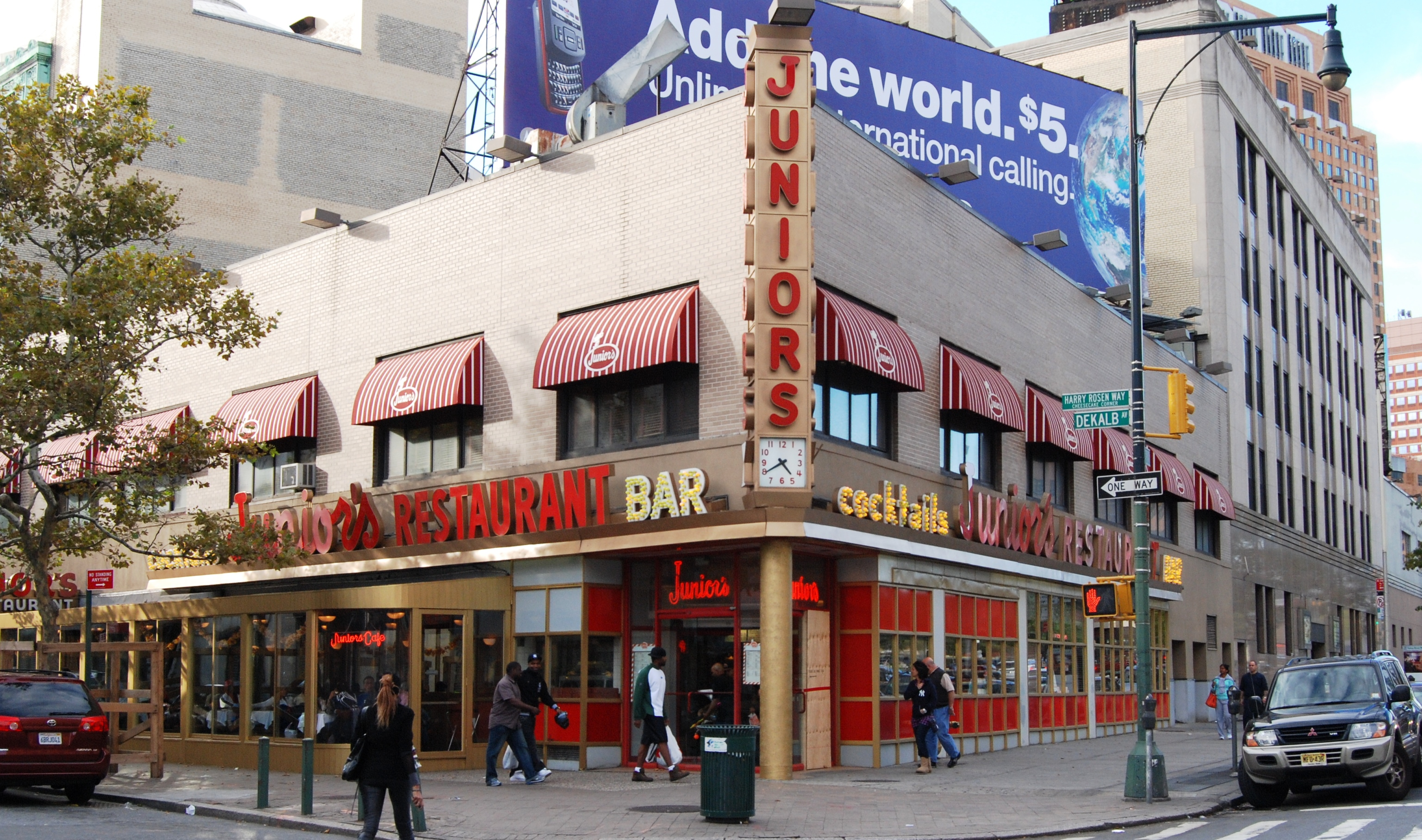
- Junior's in Brooklyn (2009)
- Type: Family restaurant
- Founded: 1950; 76 years ago in Brooklyn, New York City
- Founder: Harry Rosen
- Headquarters: Downtown Brooklyn, New York City
- Products: Cheesecakes, desserts, drinks
- Revenue: $200 million (2005)
- Owner: Alan Rosen
- Website: www.juniorscheesecake.com

Junior's is a restaurant chain with the original location at 386 Flatbush Avenue Extension at the corner of DeKalb Avenue in Downtown Brooklyn, New York City. Other locations include the Times Square area and the lobby of the Fox Tower in the Foxwoods Resort in Ledyard, Connecticut. The restaurant was founded by Harry Rosen in 1950, although his family had run a diner in that location, albeit not under the Junior's name, since 1929. It is now owned and run by his grandson Alan Rosen. The restaurant is known for iconic New York-style cheesecake. According to the restaurant, it was named Junior's after Rosen's two sons, Walter and Marvin.

== History ==
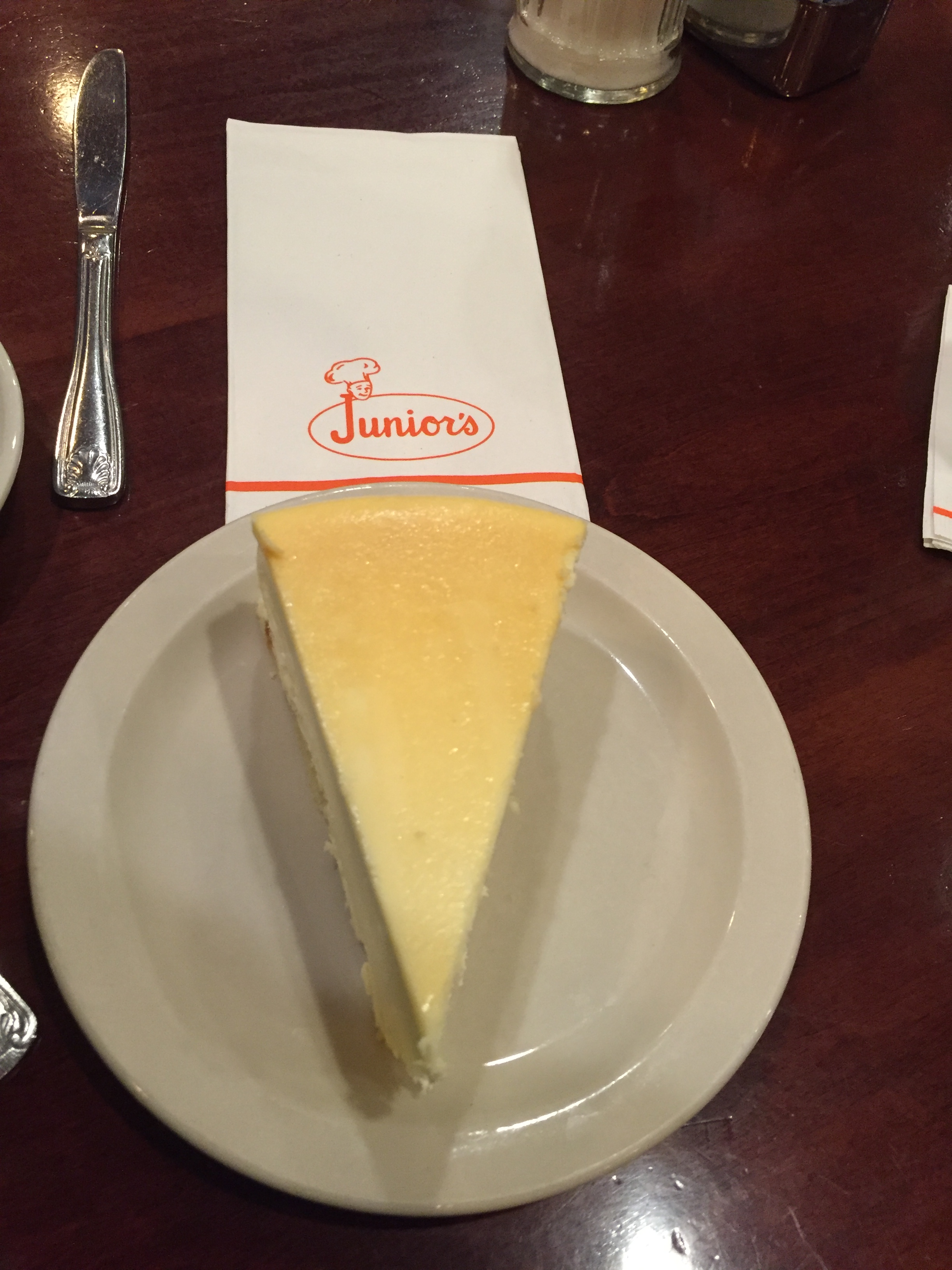
Famous No. 1 Original Cheesecake

According to GO Brooklyn, "At the corner of Flatbush and DeKalb avenues in Downtown Brooklyn, there has been a diner run by the Rosen family since 1929. In 1950, the name was changed to Junior's, and it has been serving its famous cheesecake and other goodies ever since." Current owner Alan Rosen identifies the roots of the cheesecake in Ashkenazi Jewish cuisine.

Rosen worked with master baker Eigel Peterson to create the cheesecake known today as "The World's Most Fabulous Cheesecake", based on a recipe that was in the Rosen family for three generations, a recipe that calls for sponge cake instead of graham cracker crust. In addition to cheesecake, Junior's features deli sandwiches (particularly corned beef and pastrami), ten ounce steakburgers, cheese blintzes, and unique onion rings.

Fans of the restaurant are not limited to Brooklynites. A Kuwaiti prince was known to have taken several Junior's cheesecakes back with him. A shrine to the Brooklyn of old, Junior's has become a must-visit for politicians from borough presidents to President Barack Obama, who bought two cheesecakes and a couple of black-and-white cookies during an October 2013 visit with Bill de Blasio, who was soon to be elected mayor. In 2020, after reviewing the Federal Election Commission (FEC) filings of Senator Chuck Schumer, the New York Post revealed that the Senate Minority Leader had spent US$8,600 on Junior's cheesecakes in a decade of purchases. Schumer admitted that he had spent a bundle over the years on Junior's cheesecakes, calling them his "guilty pleasure". Holding a platter of the famous dessert at a news conference, he quipped: "Guilty as charged. I love Junior's cheesecake so much. It's the best cheesecake in the world. It is made in Brooklyn. I've been going to Junior's since I've been a little boy. And it's my guilty pleasure."

In 1981, when the restaurant caught on fire, a crowd of people watching the firefighters started chanting "Save the Cheesecake!" The interior of the restaurant was modernized after the fire.

== Building and future plans ==
The building, at the corner of DeKalb Avenue and Flatbush Avenue Extension, is 17,000 square feet (1,600 m^{2}) of red-and-white-striped menus, flashbulb-adorned signs, rust-colored booths and a wooden bar.

In February 2014 the third generation owner Alan Rosen put the building on the market for development as an apartment tower with the hope of striking a deal with a developer to allow Junior's to return as a ground floor tenant. Rosen received offers up to $45M, but that offer wouldn't accommodate Junior's on the ground floor. In September 2014 Rosen took the building off the market after deciding the existing building is Junior's identity.

In April 2015, Junior's announced it would move its baking operations from Queens to Burlington, New Jersey.

In 2016, the location inside Grand Central Terminal in Midtown Manhattan was closed.

== In popular culture ==
- Junior's cheesecakes have been sold nationwide through various outlets, including the television shopping network, QVC.
- The diner was featured in the Brooklyn Public Library's children's book of Brooklyn landmarks, Brooklyn Pops Up.
- In Tom Robbins' 1980 novel Still Life with Woodpecker, Junior's cheesecake is referred to in "How to make love stay".
- In a 2003 Making the Band 2 episode, "Da Band" was assigned to walk to Brooklyn and get a slice of cheesecake from Junior's for Sean "P. Diddy" Combs. They also filmed their single "Tonight" from their 2003 album Too Hot for TV in front of the restaurant.
- In 2010, Junior's defeated fellow New York City cheesecake shop Eileen's Special on an episode of Food Feuds as chef Michael Symon's choice for best cheesecake in New York City.
- Junior's featured as an impromptu gathering location in the 2014 movie The Angriest Man in Brooklyn starring Robin Williams and Mila Kunis.
- Did collab in the 90’s with shoe brand, Lugz.

== See also ==
- List of Ashkenazi Jewish restaurants
- List of restaurants in New York City
