= Adonis Shropshire =

American songwriter and record producer

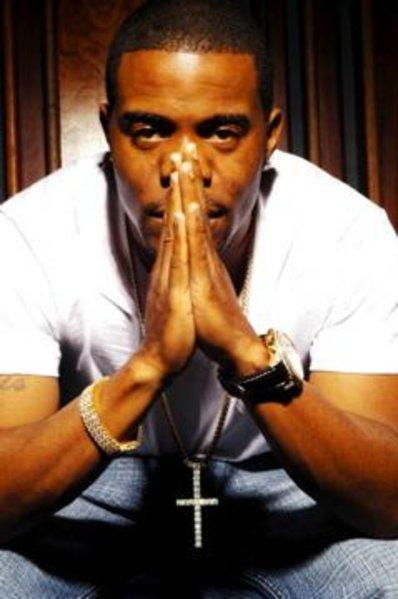
- Undated headshot of Shropshire

Background information
- Also known as: Adonis
- Born: Taurian Adonis Shropshire; Atlanta, Georgia, U.S.
- Origin: Chattanooga, Tennessee, U.S.
- Genres: R&B; hip hop; pop
- Occupations: Record producer; songwriter
- Years active: 2001–present
- Labels: Phoenix Ave; BeatStreet; Bad Boy

Taurian Adonis Shropshire is an American songwriter and record producer.

Beginning his career in 2001, Shropshire has written or produced hit singles for various artists, including Mariah Carey's "I Stay In Love", Usher's "My Boo", P. Diddy's "I Need a Girl (Part One)", "I Need a Girl (Part Two)", Chris Brown's "Say Goodbye", Ciara's "And I", Marques Houston's "Circle", Day26's "Since You've Been Gone", Enrique Iglesias's "Push", Ginuwine's "Last Chance", Beyoncé's "Summertime", and Lee Taemin's "Play Me". He received his first formal credit on Jennifer Lopez's 2001 single "Walking On Sunshine". He has won three Grammy Awards from 17 nominations.

== History ==
Adonis Shropshire was born in Atlanta, Georgia, and grew up in Chattanooga, Tennessee, where he attended the Chattanooga Phoenix III High School for the Performing Arts. While in middle school, he met Usher Raymond IV (the two would later form a group before Raymond's move to Atlanta). While frequenting a local studio he learned the art of creating songs, music production, using audio equipment, recording, as well as structuring and writing lyric melody. Currently Adonis is the CEO, and Founder of Beatstreet, Inc.

While having a friendship with R&B trio Blaque, he would travel to various recording sessions with them. Natina Reed and her former Blaque group member Shamari Fears, noticed a particular talent he had for producing vocals and allowed him to contribute in the studio. These sessions were his first "real" recording sessions, which consisted of helping vocal produce three songs for the group's debut album.

In 1997, he moved back to Atlanta to pursue his dream of breaking into the music industry. While in a local singing group he was introduced to Rowdy Records executive Kirk Woods, who would later become his manager. When the group disbanded in 2000, he started writing songs for other recording artists. This prompted his manager to set up a meeting with producer Sean Combs. While in New York, Shropshire worked on Jennifer Lopez's 2001 album J.Lo. This was Shropshire' first songwriting credit. Soon after Combs signed Shropshire to his publishing venture with EMI as part of his in-house production team the Hitmen." He then began working on songs for Faith Evans, Carl Thomas, 112, Cheri Dennis, Beyoncé, Usher, B2K, and Ciara.

His affiliation with Bad Boy led to him working with Noontime (which had a co-management deal with Bad Boy). This work resulted in him meeting Bryan-Michael Cox. Adonis's relationship with Cox soon had him producing and writing for Chris Brown, Nicole Scherzinger, Mariah Carey and Gwen Stefani. Although prior to working with Cox, Adonis had written and produced an extensive body of work (including Hot 100 #1 hits such as Usher's "My Boo") in addition to Combs's "I Need a Girl (Part One)" and "I Need a Girl (Part Two)" and two Grammy Awards (for work on albums by Carey and Usher), Chris Brown's "Say Goodbye" marked his first Hot R&B Chart #1 hit with Cox.

In 2014 Adonis began working with Kristinia DeBarge on her third studio album. On January 5, 2015, he and DeBarge started releasing new music exclusively through YouTube. She entitled the project "New Music Mondays".

== Selected production and writing credits ==
Date	Artist	Song	Album	Label
2001	Jennifer Lopez	"Walking on Sunshine"	J. Lo	Epic Records
2001	P. Diddy & the Bad Boy Family	"Ride wit Me"	The Saga Continues...	Bad Boy Records
2001	Faith Evans	"Don't Cry"	Faithfully	Bad Boy Records
2001	Jennifer Lopez	"Walking on Sunshine (Metro Remix)"	J to tha L-O! The Remixes	Epic Records
2001	Dream	"This Is Me (Remix)"	Totally Hits	Arista
2002	Keith Sweat	"Trust Me"	Rebirth	Elektra Records
2002	P. Diddy	"I Need a Girl (Part One)" (featuring Usher and Loon)	We Invented The Remix: Volume 1	Bad Boy Records
2002	P. Diddy	"I Need a Girl (Part Two)" (featuring Ginuwine, Loon and Mario Winans)	We Invented The Remix: Volume 1	Bad Boy Records
2002	Nivea	"U Don't Even Know" (featuring Nick Cannon)	Nivea	Jive Records
2002	B2K	"One Kiss"	Pandemonium!	Epic Records
2003	Latif	"My Man's Girl"	Love In The First	Motown Records
2003	Latif	"Love in the First"	Love In The First	Motown Records
2003	Latif	"Put Me On"	Love In The First	Motown Records
2003	Beyoncé	"Keep Giving Your Love to Me"	Bad Boys II	Bad Boy Records
2003	Nelly	Shake Ya Tailfeather	Bad Boys II	Bad Boy Records
2003	Nick Cannon	"Whenever You Need Me"	Nick Cannon	Jive Records
2003	Loon	"Like a Movie"	Loon	Bad Boy Records
2003	B2K	"Out The Hood"	You Got Served Soundtrack	Epic Records
2003	B2K	"Sprung"	You Got Served Soundtrack	Epic Records
2003	112	"Say Yes"	Hot & Wet	Bad Boy Records
2003	Beyoncé	"Summertime"	The Fighting Temptations (Soundtrack)	Columbia Records
2004	8Ball & MJG	"Tryna Get at You"	Living Legends	Bad Boy Records
2004	Carl Thomas	"She Is" (featuring LL Cool J)	Let's Talk About It	Bad Boy Records
2004	Carl Thomas	"Let Me Know"	Let's Talk About It	Bad Boy Records
2004	Carl Thomas	"But Me"	Let's Talk About It	Bad Boy Records
2004	Usher	"My Boo" (with Alicia Keys)	Confessions	LaFace Records
2004	Mario Winans	"Never Really Was"	Hurt No More	Bad Boy Records
2004	Mario Winans	"Can"t Judge Me"	Hurt No More	Bad Boy Records
2004	Mario Winans	"You Knew"	Hurt No More	Bad Boy Records
2004	Mario Winans	"Turn Around"	Hurt No More	Bad Boy Records
2004	Mario Winans	"What's Wrong wit Me"	Hurt No More	Bad Boy Records
2004	Ciara	"And I"	Goodies	Jive Records
2004	O'Ryan	"Take It Slow"	O'Ryan	Universal Records
2004	O'Ryan	"Anything"	O'Ryan	Universal Records
2004	O'Ryan	"Introducing"	O'Ryan	Universal Records
2004	New Edition	"Love Again"	One Love	Bad Boy Records
2004	New Edition	"Sexy Lady"	One Love	Bad Boy Records
2004	New Edition	"Love Again"	One Love	Bad Boy Records
2005	Chris Brown	"Say Goodbye"	Chris Brown	Jive Records
2005	Chris Brown	"Winner"	Chris Brown	Jive Records
2005	Chris Brown	"One Mo 'Gin"	Chris Brown	Jive Records
2005	Mariah Carey	"So Lonely(One and Only Pt. 2)"	The Emancipation of Mimi	Island
2005	Marques Houston	"Do You Mind"	Naked	Universal Records
2005	Teairra Mari	"Act Right"	Roc-A-Fella Presents: Teairra Mari	Roc-A-Fella
2005	Twista	"So Lonely(One and Only Pt. 3)"	The Day After	Atlantic Records
2005	Usher	"What You Need"	Rhythm City Volume One: Caught Up	LaFace Records
2005	The Notorious B.I.G.	"Nasty Girl" with Diddy, Nelly, Jagged Edge and Avery Storm	Duets: The Final Chapter	Bad Boy Records
2006	Danity Kane	"Ride for You"	Danity Kane	Bad Boy Records
2006	Danity Kane	"One Shot"	Danity Kane	Bad Boy Records
2006	Danity Kane	"Touching My Body"	Danity Kane	Bad Boy Records
2006	Marques Houston	"Circle"	Veteran	Universal Records
2006	Marques Houston	"Exclusively"	Veteran	Universal Records
2006	Kenny Lattimore & Chante Moore	"Figure It Out"	Uncovered/Covered	LaFace Records
2006	Lloyd	"Lloyd"	Street Love	Motown Records
2006	Sammie	"Another Last Chance"	Sammie	Motown Records
2006	Sammie	"Come with Me"	Sammie	Motown Records
2006	Sammie	"Back to Love"	Sammie	Motown Records
2006	Ciara	"C.R.U.S.H."	Ciara: The Evolution	Jive Records
2006	Frankie J	"Priceless"	Priceless	Columbia Records
2006	Cherish	"Show and Tell"	Unappreciated	Capitol Records
2006	Cherish	"Oooh"	Unappreciated	Capitol Records
2006	Cherish	"Moment in time"	Unappreciated	Capitol Records
2006	Cherish	"Chevy"	Unappreciated	Capitol Records
2006	Omarion	"Made for T.V."	21	Sony Records
2006	Omarion	"Just Can't Let You Go"	21	Sony Records
2006	Avant	"Mr. Dream"	Director	Geffen Records
2006	Avant	"Grown Ass Man"	Director	Geffen Records
2006	Tamia	"Too Grown for That"	Between Friends	Image Records
2007	J Holiday	"Be with Me"	Back of My Lac'	Jive Records
2007	J Holiday	"Without You"	Back of My Lac'	Jive Records
2007	J Holiday	"Thank You"	Back of My Lac'	Jive Records
2007	B5	"Erica Kane"	Don't Talk, Just Listen	Bad Boy Records
2007	B5	"Right to Left"	Don't Talk, Just Listen	Bad Boy Records
2007	Keyshia Cole	"Was It Worth It"	Just like You	Geffen Records
2007	Enrique Iglesias	"Push"	Insomniac	Interscope Records
2007	Chris Brown	"Throwed"	Exclusive	Jive Records
2007	Brick & Lace	"BoyFriend"	Love Is Wicked	Interscope Records
2008	Day26	"Since You've Been Gone"	Day26	Bad Boy Records
2008	Cheri Dennis	"Remind You"	In and Out of Love	Bad Boy Records
2008	Cheri Dennis	"Dropping Out of Love"	In and Out of Love	Bad Boy Records
2008	Danity Kane	"2 of You"	Welcome to the Dollhouse	Bad Boy Records
2008	Algebra	"Tug of War"	Purpose	Universal Records
2008	Mariah Carey	"I Stay in Love"	E=MC²	Island/DefJam
2008	Mariah Carey	"For the Record"	E=MC²	Island/DefJam
2008	Mariah Carey	"4Real 4Real"	E=MC²	Island/DefJam
2008	Lloyd	"Heart Attack"	Lessons in Love	Universal Records
2008	Lloyd	"Love Making 101"	Lessons in Love	Universal Records
2008	Sterling Simms	"Best Friend"	Yours, Mine & The Truth	Def Jam Records
2008	Sterling Simms	"I Know"	Yours, Mine & The Truth	Def Jam Records
2009	Pleasure P	"I'm a Beast"	The Introduction of Marcus Cooper	Atlantic Records
2009	Ginuwine	"Last Chance"	A Man's Thoughts	Warner Bros. Records
2009	Ginuwine	"One Time for Love"	A Man's Thoughts	Warner Bros. Records
2009	Ginuwine	"Bridge to Love (featuring Brandy)"	A Man's Thoughts	Warner Bros. Records
2009	Day26	"Stadium Music"	Forever in a Day	Bad Boy Records
2009	Day26	"Baby Maker"	Forever in a Day	
2009	Kristinia DeBarge	"Goodbye"	Exposed	Def Jam Records
2010	Justin Bieber	"Overboard"	My World 2.0	Def Jam Records
2010	Monica	"Still Standing" (featuring Ludacris)	Still Standing	J Records
2010	Monica	"Lesson Learned"	Still Standing	J Records
2010	Toni Braxton	"Wardrobe"	"Pulse"	LaFace Records
2010	Bertel	"I'm Tryin"	"Goin Hard"	Capitol Records
2011	Aubrey O'Day	"Automatic"		SRC Records
2011	Joe Jonas	"Kleptomaniac"	Fastlife	Hollywood Records
2011	Ginuwine	"Drink of Choice"	Elgin	Universal Records
2011	Bobby V	"Outfit"	Fly on the Wall	Capitol Records
2011	Justin Bieber (feat. Boyz II Men)	"Fa La La"	Under the Mistletoe	Def Jam Records
2011	Isaac Carree	"As-Is"	Uncommon Me	Universal Records
2011	Isaac Carree	"Putcha One Hand Up"	Uncommon Me	Universal Records
2011	Mary J. Blige	"Miss Me with That"	My Life II... The Journey Continues (Act 1)	Geffen Records
2011	Mary J. Blige	"You Want This"	My Life II... The Journey Continues (Act 1)	Geffen Records
2012	Jin Akanishi	"Sun Burns Down"	Japonicana	Warner Bros. Records
2012	Jon B.	"Goin Down"	Comfortable Swagg	Vibezelect
2012	Chris Brown	"2012"	Fortune	RCA Records
2012	Lonny Bereal	"Thrilla"	The Love Train	Universal Records
2013	Fantasia Barrino	"Supernatural Love"	Side Effects of You	RCA Records
2013	TGT	"All For You"	Three Kings	Atlantic Records
2013	Tamar Braxton	"No Gift"	Winter Loversland	Epic Records
2013	Isaac Carree	"I Got You"	Reset	Door 6 Ent.
2013	Raheem DeVaughn	"Cry Baby"	A Place Called Love Land	Fontana Distribution
2015	Super Junior-D&E	"The Beat goes On"	The Beat Goes On	SM Entertainment
2015	Exo	"시선 둘, 시선 하나 (What If...)"	Exodus	SM Entertainment
2015	Chris Brown	"Right To You"	Royalty	RCA Records
2016	P. Diddy	"I Need a Girl (Part One)" (featuring Usher and Loon)	Bad Boy 20th Anniversary Box Set Edition	Bad Boy Records
2016	Day26	"Since You've Been Gone"	Bad Boy 20th Anniversary Box Set Edition	Bad Boy Records
2016	Nelly	"Shake Ya Tailfeather"	Bad Boy 20th Anniversary Box Set Edition	Bad Boy Records
2016	Usher	"Stronger"	Hard II Love	RCA Records
2016	Kristinia DeBarge	"Hol' On Boy"	Thinkin Out Loud	Beatstreet INC.
2016	Kristinia DeBarge	"Problem"	Thinkin Out Loud	Beatstreet INC.
2016	Kristinia DeBarge	"Afternoon Cigarette"	Thinkin Out Loud	Beatstreet INC.
2016	Kristinia DeBarge	"I Don't Giva"	Thinkin Out Loud	Beatstreet INC.
2016	Kristinia DeBarge	"Amnesia"	Thinkin Out Loud	Beatstreet INC.
2016	Kristinia DeBarge	"Ricky Bobby"	Thinkin Out Loud	Beatstreet INC.
2016	Kristinia DeBarge	"Church"	Thinkin Out Loud	Beatstreet INC.
2016	Kristinia DeBarge	"Fadeout"	Thinkin Out Loud	Beatstreet INC.
2017	LeToya Luckett	"My Love"	Back 2 Life	Eone Music
2017	LeToya Luckett	"In The Name Of Love"	Back 2 Life	Eone Music
2017	Fifth Harmony	"Por Favor" (with Pitbull)	Fifth Harmony	Epic Records
2018	Kristinia DeBarge	"Alright"	Single	Bane Ent.
2019	Kristinia DeBarge	"Breathe"	Single	Bane Ent.
2019	Kristinia DeBarge	"Back In The Day"	Single	Bane Ent.

== Grammy Awards and nominations ==
The Grammy Awards are awarded annually by the National Academy of Recording Arts and Sciences of the United States. Adonis has received 3 awards from 17 nominations.

Year	Nominee / work	Award	Result
2003	Faithfully	Best Contemporary R&B Album	Nominated
2005	Confessions	Best Contemporary R&B Album	Won
2005	My Boo	Best R&B Song	Nominated
2005	Confessions	Album Of The Year	Nominated
2005	Hurt No More	Best Contemporary R&B Album	Nominated
2005	My Boo	Best R&B Performance by a Duo or Group with Vocal	Won
2006	The Emancipation of Mimi	Best Contemporary R&B Album	Won
2006	The Emancipation of Mimi	Album Of The Year	Nominated
2007	Chris Brown	Best Contemporary R&B Album	Nominated
2008	Just like You	Best Contemporary R&B Album	Nominated
2009	Back of My Lac'	Best Contemporary R&B Album	Nominated
2010	The Introduction of Marcus Cooper	Best Contemporary R&B Album	Nominated
2011	Still Standing	Best R&B Album	Nominated
2011	My World 2.0	Best Pop Vocal Album	Nominated
2013	Fortune	Best Urban Contemporary Album	Nominated
2014	TGT	Best R&B Album	Nominated
2014	Side Effects of You	Best Urban Contemporary Album	Nominated
