= Taquita + Kaui =

- Genre: Reality
- Starring: Taquita Thorns; Kaui Beamer
- Country of origin: United States
- No. of seasons: 1
- No. of episodes: 8 (4 unaired)

Production
- Executive producers: Perry Dance; Sean "Diddy" Combs; Ted Iredell
- Production companies: Bad Boy World Wide Entertainment Group; Ted & Perry Company

Original release
- Network: MTV
- Release: April 2 – April 23, 2007

Taquita & Kaui is an American reality television series on MTV. The series premiered on April 2, 2007. The series follows Taquita Thorns and Kaui Beamer, former contestants on Making the Band 3, as they work on jump starting their new lives together as roommates in Las Vegas. The theme song is "Proud Mary" in the Tina Turner style and each episode has different ending introductions, à la Muppet Show, such as the K on the marquee dropping down into Kaui's hands.

== Production and cancellation ==
MTV originally ordered eight episodes of the series but on April 23, 2007, the series was pulled off the air with reruns in its place. The four unaired episodes were never shown.

Kaui posted on her Myspace that MTV had planned to finish the series off but executives decided against it due to the low number of viewers watching the series.

== Episodes ==
No.	Title	Original release date
1	"Viva Las Vegas"	April 2, 2007
2	"Legends in the Making"	April 9, 2007
3	"Wild Wild West"	April 16, 2007
4	"Ring Girls"	April 23, 2007
