= Alan Rosen (restaurant owner) =

American restaurant owner and author (born 1969)

- Born: 1969 (age 56–57); New York City, U.S.
- Education: Cornell University School of Hotel Administration (1991)
- Occupations: Restaurant and bakery owner, and author
- Years active: 1993–present
- Employer: Junior's Restaurants and Bakery
- Board member of: Fulton Mall Improvements Association; Cornell University School of Hotel Administration Dean's Advisory Board; Romacorp
- Children: 3

Alan Rosen (born 1969) is an American restaurant and bakery owner and an author. He is the third-generation owner of Junior's Restaurants and Bakery, which is known for its cheesecakes. The company, founded with an initial restaurant in Brooklyn, New York, in 1950 by his grandfather, has six restaurants and outposts, a mail order business, a wholesale business, and a licensing operation.

== Early and personal life ==
Rosen was born and initially raised in New York City, and is Jewish. He is the son of Walter Rosen and Sandy Puro, and the grandson of Harry Rosen and the former Ruth Jacobson. He later grew up in Great Neck, New York, and lived in the town of Harrison, New York, and is a member of Temple Emanu-El in Harrison. He now lives in Purchase, New York.

He attended the Cornell University School of Hotel Administration, as the first in his family to go to college, graduating in 1991. Rosen is now on the Dean's Advisory Board of the school. In January 1998 he married Leslie Beth Finkelstein, and he and his now-ex-wife have three children.

== Career ==
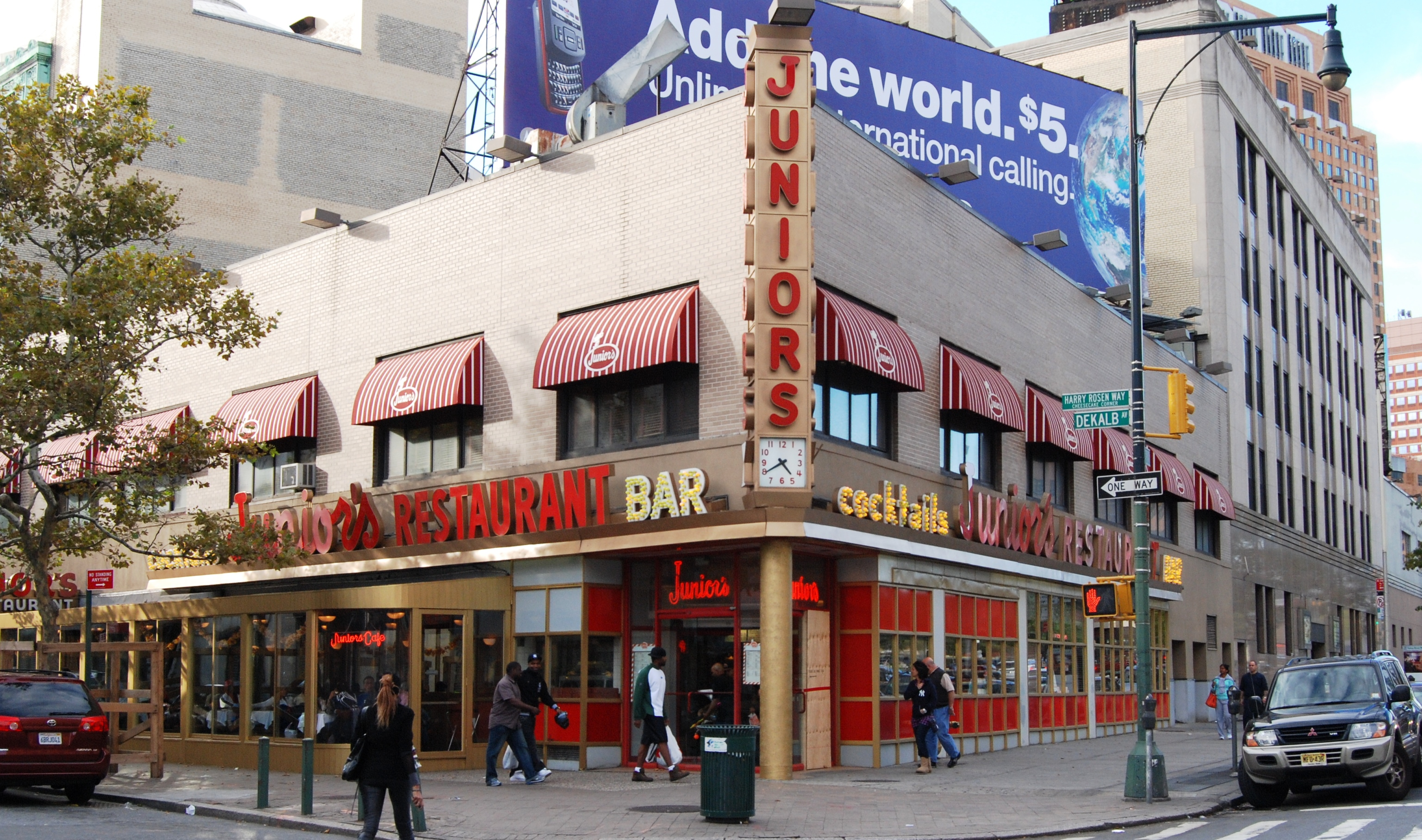
Junior's Restaurants and Bakery in Brooklyn, 2009

Rosen is the owner of Junior's Restaurants and Bakery, initially with his brother Kevin, since the 1990s. He is the third generation of his family to run the company. His grandfather, Harry, the Jewish son of immigrants from Ukraine and born on the Lower East Side, founded the original restaurant in November 1950. His father, Walter, started running it in the 1970s with Walter's brother Marvin. Rosen oversees the restaurants and operations, which as of 2023 generated over $100 million in sales annually, served over 5,000 customers daily, and sold five million cheesecakes every year ranging in weight from 4 ounces to 14 pounds. It is known for its cheesecakes, for which it uses the same recipe created in 1960 by Rosen's grandfather and by baker Eigel Peterson. In 1997, The New York Times reported that critics had called it "the best cheesecake in the material world," and "edible ivory, like some new element on the atomic chart." Rosen has promised never to change the recipe.

While in high school and college, Rosen worked as a manager at the restaurant's original Brooklyn location. After graduating from university, Rosen worked for three years at other restaurants and at nightclubs. He then returned to Junior's in 1993, first as a floor manager and then as its director of marketing.

The company has six restaurants and outposts, a mail order business, a wholesale business, and a licensing operation. It has locations that include its original and now flagship storefront on the corner of Flatbush Avenue and DeKalb Avenue in Brooklyn, in Grand Central Terminal and Times Square (in the Theater District) in Manhattan (Rosen said that when the location opened, its "Brooklyn NY" sign confused subway riders who thought that they had exited at the wrong subway stop), in the Foxwoods Resort Casino in Connecticut, and in Barclays Center in Downtown Brooklyn. It also has a baking facility in Burlington in South Jersey; Rosen moved from a baking facility in Maspeth, Queens, when the owners sold that space. In November 2023, Rosen opened up a restaurant in Resorts World Las Vegas. Junior's cheesecake is also sold in Japan, France, and South Korea.

Rosen appears on QVC 50 times every year, and has also appeared on national television shows, including ABC's Good Morning America, The Chew, NBC's Today, Food Network's Throwdown! with Bobby Flay, and Emeril Live.

In September 1996, he sold 2,400 cheesecakes in four minutes on QVC. He was named to the Crain's New York "40 Under 40 Class of 2002" when Rosen was 32 years old.

In 2014, Rosen turned down a $45 million offer ($450-per-buildable-square-foot) from JDS Development Group to buy the two-story Brooklyn building of the flagship Juniors restaurant. He said his family's business was too important to him and to the community.

In 2020, he joined Romacorp's (Tony Roma's) board of directors.

In December 2021, Rosen said that a cream cheese shortage was badly hurting his business. He said it was a major ingredient in his cheesecake, and demand had increased 43% while at the same time there was a labor crisis at some dairy plants.

In August 2022, Rosen announced a partnership with candle company Literie on a strawberry cheesecake-scented candle. He said that "With this partnership ... our fans from all over can still be enticed by our famous scent – but without the calories!"

== Civic activities ==
In May 2021, Rosen sponsored a program that bought back guns in Brooklyn; the program yielded 69 weapons. Rosen said he thought the buyback program was a success, and that "It may not be the most efficient way to solve gun violence issues, but it's what I can do right now." In 2023 he sponsored his third gun buyback, partnering with the Brooklyn District Attorney's Office.

Rosen is on the board of the Fulton Mall Improvements Association as part of the Downtown Brooklyn Partnership.

In June 2024, Rosen said that he was considering running in the 2025 New York City mayoral election, and was gauging political and public interest in him running for mayor. He describes himself as a fiscally conservative and socially liberal moderate Republican. The election is scheduled for November 4, 2025. He is hoping to attract the backing of the Republican Party, as he said: "I don't have the kind of bread or cheesecake to do this on my own". His concerns about New York City have included shoplifting at pharmacies, safety of residents, cashless bail, quality of life, and the cost of living.

== Author ==
Rosen is the co-author of three books: Junior's Cheesecake Cookbook: 50 To-Die-For Recipes for New York-Style Cheesecake (Taunton Press, 2007), Junior's Dessert Cookbook: 75 Recipes for Cheesecakes, Pies, Cookies, Cakes and More (Taunton Press, 2011), and Junior's Home Cooking: Over 100 Recipes for Classic Comfort Food (Taunton Press, 2013).
