= Da Band =

American hip hop group

Bad Boy's Da Band
- Origin: New York City, U.S.
- Genres: Hip hop; R&B
- Years active: 2002–2004
- Labels: Universal; Bad Boy
- Formed by: P. Diddy
- Members: Sara Rivers; Dylan Dilinjah; Chopper "Young City"; Babs; Ness; Freddy P

Bad Boy's Da Band was an American hip hop group put together by Sean "P. Diddy" Combs and signed to his label, Bad Boy Entertainment. The group's formation was documented for three seasons of MTV's reality television series, Making the Band 2.

== Career ==
During the preliminary period, 40,000 participants auditioned for a place in the group but Diddy narrowed it down to six artists. For several weeks the group was subjected to vigorous and sometimes demeaning tasks, including walking from midtown Manhattan to Brooklyn to purchase a Junior's cheesecake for Diddy, and Ness's battle with the Harlem rapper Jae Millz. Their first album, Too Hot for TV, was released in September 2003.

=== After Da Band ===
On the season three finale, the group effectively ended when Diddy dissolved them and chose to keep Ness and Babs. Though not chosen to be kept on the season three finale, Diddy later brought Chopper "Young City" back on the label. Ness and Babs were to be a duo and Chopper was to be a solo artist on Bad Boy South. Chopper eventually left the label and was followed by Babs some time later, leaving Ness the group's only member still signed to Bad Boy. Ness has worked as a songwriter for Diddy on albums such as Press Play (2006). Ness cut ties with the label the following year. The group (minus Freddy P and Dylan, who was played by Chappelle and appeared via footage) parodied their experience during the filming of Making the Band 2 on Dave Chappelle's sketch comedy show Chappelle's Show. The group members have since been working on solo projects and have maintained good relationships with each other. Sara Rivers previously Sara Stokes has since been remarried to new husband Fashun Rivers and also now share a newborn together that goes by the moniker "Baby" Fashun. Sara is now very involved in her entrepreneurial endeavors with her company SaraFina Co. an apparel and skincare collection. Chopper and Ness were involved in a long-standing dispute but that seems to have been settled. According to Dylan in a 2014 interview, the group was talking about reuniting but Chopper is apparently not yet on board.

In 2022, it was revealed that Chopper was facing a felony sex trafficking charge in Las Vegas in an ongoing criminal investigation alleging that he used his large social media following to recruit women as prostitutes, according to police.

== Band members ==
- Sara Rivers (born June 1, 1977) – a Port Huron R&B singer
- Dylan Dilinjah (born Dylan John on February 8, 1980) – a Brooklyn dancehall deejay
- Chopper "Young City" (born Kevin Barnes on January 12, 1988) – a rapper from the 3rd Ward of Uptown New Orleans, Louisiana (Chopper recorded under the alias of Rodney Hill in an attempt to avoid prosecution by the law.)
- Babs (born Lynese Wiley in 1979) – an MC from Brooklyn, New York
- E. Ness (born Lloyd Mathis in 1977) – an MC & battle rapper from Philadelphia
- Freddy P (born Freddrick Watson on November 23, 1981) – a Liberty City, Miami, Florida MC

== Discography ==
=== Studio albums ===
Year	Album	Peak chart positions		Certifications
Year	Album	U.S.	U.S. R&B	Certifications
2003	Too Hot for TV: Released: September 30, 2003; Label: Universal, Bad Boy	2	1	RIAA: Gold

=== Singles ===
Year	Title	Chart positions			Album
Year	Title	Billboard Hot 100	Hot R&B/Hip-Hop Songs	Hot Rap Tracks	Album
2003	"Bad Boy This, Bad Boy That"	50	15	13	Too Hot for TV

Preceded by O-Town	Making the Band winners 2002	Succeeded by Danity Kane
