= TaQuita Thorns =

American singer-songwriter

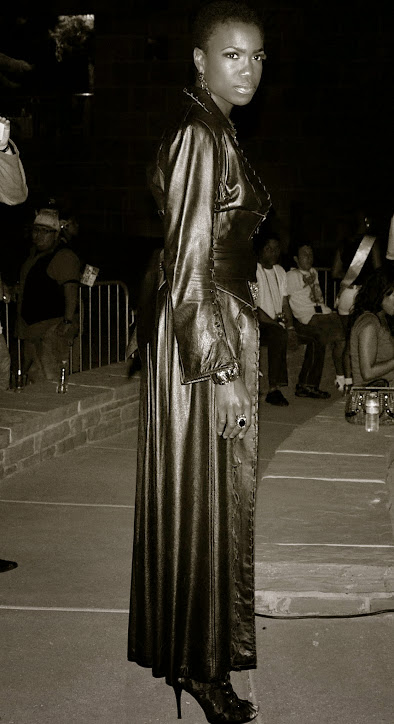

Background information
- Born: August 24, 1986 (age 39); Detroit, Michigan, United States
- Genres: Rock, Soul
- Occupations: Singer, songwriter
- Instrument: Vocals
- Years active: 2004–present
- Label: On Orbit Records
- Website: http://www.taquitathorns.com

TaQuita Thorns (August 24, 1986) is an American singer-songwriter and MTV star from Detroit, Michigan.

== Early life ==
TaQuita's list of influences includes Aretha Franklin, Diana Ross, Cher, The Temptations, James Brown, Little Richard, Whitney Houston, and Michael Jackson.

TaQuita began to write music and perform as a child. Her first experience performing was singing at a family gathering at age two. When she wrote songs she would also pair them with illustrations. She was recognized for her talent and allowed to sing over the school public address system in kindergarten. At 10-year-old she joined the Diamonds in the Rough, a girl group. TaQuita also enjoyed athletics and got involved in sports at Denby Tech High School. She ran cross-country, and joined the cheer team, JROTC and the marching band.

In high school, TaQuita earned the position of lead vocalist in the school choir, and captain of the dance team. She performed on the "All City" dance team, which represented the top dancers at each of Detroit's high schools. TaQuita graduated from high school in 2004.

== Early career and MTV ==
While studying dance and music at Wayne State University, TaQuita auditioned for Sean "P. Diddy" Combs and was selected to be on MTV's Making the Band 3. She moved to New York City where the filming took place. MTV later decided to feature TaQuita in a separate series, The TaQuita & Kaui Show. Between filming "Making the Band" and "Taquita & Kaui", TaQuita performed as a principal singer with the Velocity group at Detroit's Greektown Casino, where she opened for acts such as Busta Rhymes, India.Irie and Howie Mandel.

"The TaQuita & Kaui Show" went on air in 2007. The show focused on TaQuita and Making the Band co-star, Kaui Beamer, while they auditioned for jobs in the Vegas entertainment industry. The show was staged in a tiny apartment at the Happi Inn, and various locations around Las Vegas. The cast included Rita, the manager of the Happi Inn, and other residents.

== Solo career ==
After the filming of "The TaQuita & Kaui Show", Thorns pursued a solo career as a professional singer and songwriter. On February 11, 2012, TaQuita performed her first show as a solo act at the Peacock Lounge in Sunnyvale, California. On April 13, 2012, she opened for San Jose-based rapper Kung Fu Vampire at his 8th Annual Masquerade Party at the Blank Club in San Jose. TaQuita also performed live in Las Vegas in September at the PURE House Music Festival and, in December 2012, she appeared as a guest presenter at the OUTMusic Awards and featured performer at its official after party.

TaQuita Thorns released two singles and music videos in anticipation of her first album titled, Rough & Fancy Vol. 1. In November 2012, TaQuita released the music video "Believe (Power of Love)". In March 2013, TaQuita released the music video "Nobody But You".

TaQuita Thorns released her debut album, Rough & Fancy Vol. 1, on May 21, 2013. She debuted several songs from the album at her Los Angeles Premiere at The Mint LA on May 5, 2013, where she was backed by many of the acclaimed musicians who play on the record. Ms. Thorns and her 11-piece band also performed as the special guest at DIVA’Lation, a concert series for independent female artists, held on June 13, 2013, at The Joint in West Los Angeles.
