= If I Ruled the World (Imagine That) =

1996 single by Nas

Single by Nas

from the album It Was Written
- Released: June 11, 1996
- Genre: Hip-hop; R&B
- Length: 4:42
- Label: Columbia
- Songwriters: Nasir Jones; Samuel Barnes; Jean-Claude Olivier; Kurtis Walker; David Reeves; Lawrence Smith; Aaron O'Bryant; Jalil Hutchins; Norman Harris; Allan Felder
- Producer: Trackmasters

Nas singles chronology
"Gimme Yours" (1995)	"If I Ruled the World (Imagine That)" (1996)	"Street Dreams" (1996)

Lauryn Hill singles chronology
"If I Ruled the World" (1996)	"All My Time" (1997)

Music video
- "If I Ruled the World (Imagine That)" on YouTube

"If I Ruled the World (Imagine That)", often shortened to "If I Ruled the World", is a song by American rapper Nas featuring vocals from American singer Lauryn Hill. It was released as the lead single from Nas' second studio album It Was Written on June 4, 1996, by Columbia Records. Produced by Trackmasters, with some uncredited input by Rashad Smith, it is based on the 1985 hit of the same name by Kurtis Blow and samples the beat of "Friends" by Whodini. Hill's verse interpolates the song "Walk Right Up to the Sun" by the Delfonics. The single marked Hill's first musical appearance outside of the Fugees.

"If I Ruled the World", bolstered by a high-budget music video directed by Hype Williams and designed by visual artist and designer Ron Norsworthy, became a commercial success, reaching the top ten in eight countries. In the United States, the song entered both the Billboard Hot 100 and Cash Box Top 100 charts, peaking at numbers 19 and 53. It also peaked in the top 20 of the Billboard Hot R&B Singles chart. It earned Nas his first Grammy Award nomination for Best Rap Solo Performance at the 39th Annual Grammy Awards. Various publications have referred to it as one of the greatest rap songs of all time. In June 2021, "If I Ruled the World" was certified platinum by the Recording Industry Association of America (RIAA), becoming Nas' first single to achieve this and Hill's fourth.

== Background ==
"If I Ruled the World (Imagine That)" was by production duo Poke and Tone, consisting of Samuel Barnes and Jean-Claude Olivier, for Nas. The track was part of a strategy to broaden Nas' appeal while maintaining his hip-hop credibility. Initially resistant, Nas was eased into crossover material that combined harder tracks with singable hooks for mainstream radio. Barnes and Olivier selected Lauryn Hill for the chorus; R. Kelly, though considered, was not yet involved. They described the process as a modern adaptation of the block party tradition—rapping over instrumental R&B tracks—translated into recorded form. Despite criticism that the track was "sell-out," the producers emphasized it followed historic hip-hop practices, blending R&B instrumentation with rap to create accessible yet authentic records.

== Critical reception ==
In a retrospective review, Daryl McIntosh of Albumism noted "If I Ruled the World (Imagine That)" as "an example of the album's ambition", complimenting it for having "one of the most memorable choruses of the era." Daisy & Havoc from Music Week's RM Dance Update gave it a full score of five out of five, commenting, "This one should do well right now for a handful of reasons — it features Lauryn Hill from Fugees, it's not dissimilar to Fugees and, most importantly of all, it's a really appealing track with an addictive chorus, some great vocals and a laid-back but still serious rap. Just hope it doesn't get forgotten in the rush." David Fricke from Rolling Stone wrote that "New Yorker Nas beat hip-hop's sophomore jinx with the jaunty step and dead-sexy female chorus of 'If I Ruled the World', this summer's cruisin' smash." He added, "To suggest that the world would be a better place if cocaine came uncut [...] hardly qualifies as social enlightenment."

== Music video ==
The accompanying music video for "If I Ruled the World (Imagine That)" was directed by American director Hype Williams and designed by visual artist and designer Ron Norsworthy. It was released for the week ending on June 16, 1996. The video features cameos from Mobb Deep, AZ, Cormega and the Fugees.

== Live performances ==
Nas and Lauryn Hill performed the song live at the 1996 MTV Video Music Awards on September 4, 1996. He performed the song live at the American Music Awards of 1997 on January 27, 1997.

== Track listings ==
- US 12-inch vinyl

A1. "If I Ruled the World" (Main Mix) (4:42)
A2. "If I Ruled the World" (Instrumental) (4:34)
B1. "If I Ruled the World" (Clean Mix) (4:42)
B2. "If I Ruled the World" (A Cappella) (4:42)

- Europe maxi-CD (COL 663296 2)
1. "If I Ruled the World (Imagine That) (Main Mix)" (4:45)
2. "If I Ruled the World (Imagine That) (Instrumental)" (4:36)
3. "If I Ruled the World (Imagine That) (Clean Mix)" (4:45)
4. "If I Ruled the World (Imagine That) (A Cappella)" (4:42)
- Europe CD (COL 663296 1)
1. "If I Ruled the World (Imagine That) (Main Mix)"
2. "If I Ruled the World (Imagine That) (Instrumental)"

== Charts ==
=== Weekly charts ===
Chart (1996)	Peak position
Australia (ARIA)	100
Austria (Ö3 Austria Top 40)	30
Belgium (Ultratop 50 Flanders)	21
Belgium (Ultratop 50 Wallonia)	11
Canada (Nielsen SoundScan)	16
Europe (Eurochart Hot 100)	5
Europe (European Dance Radio)	6
France (SNEP)	4
Germany (GfK)	4
Iceland (Íslenski Listinn Topp 40)	2
Israel (Israeli Singles Chart)	2
Netherlands (Dutch Top 40)	9
Netherlands (Single Top 100)	9
New Zealand (Recorded Music NZ)	2
Norway (VG-lista)	5
Scottish Singles Sales (Official Charts)	35
Sweden (Sverigetopplistan)	3
Switzerland (Schweizer Hitparade)	7
UK Singles (Official Charts)	12
UK Dance (Official Charts)	2
UK Hip Hop/R&B (Official Charts)	1
US Billboard Hot 100	53
US Hot R&B/Hip-Hop Songs (Billboard)	17
US Rhythmic Airplay (Billboard)	8
US Cash Box Top 100	19

=== Year-end charts ===
Chart (1996)	Position
Belgium (Ultratop 50 Wallonia)	65
France (SNEP)	18
Germany (Media Control)	26
Iceland (Íslenski Listinn Topp 40)	27
Israel (Israeli Singles Chart)	44
Netherlands (Dutch Top 40)	83
Netherlands (Single Top 100)	99
New Zealand (RIANZ)	12
Sweden (Topplistan)	27
Switzerland (Schweizer Hitparade)	37
US Hot R&B Singles (Billboard)	69
US Maxi-Singles Sales (Billboard)	40

== Certifications ==
Region	Certification	Certified units/sales
France (SNEP)	Gold	250,000^{*}
Germany (BVMI)	Gold	250,000^{^}
New Zealand (RMNZ)	Platinum	30,000^{‡}
United Kingdom (BPI) Sales since 2004	Gold	400,000^{‡}
United States (RIAA)	Platinum	1,000,000^{‡}
^{*} Sales figures based on certification alone.^{^} Shipments figures based on certification alone.^{‡} Sales+streaming figures based on certification alone.

== Release history ==
Region	Date	Format(s)	Label(s)	Ref.
United States	June 11, 1996	Rhythmic contemporary radio	Columbia	
United Kingdom	August 5, 1996	12-inch vinyl; CD; cassette	Columbia	
