= Imma Put It on Her =

Single by Day26 featuring Diddy and Yung Joc

from the album Forever in a Day
- Released: March 31, 2009 (digital download)
- Genre: R&B, hip hop
- Length: 4:25 (album version); 3:45 (radio version)
- Label: Bad Boy; Atlantic
- Songwriters: Angel; Fred "Blaze the Champ" Crawford; Jasiel Robinson; McCluney; Mosely; Curry; Taylor; Young
- Producer: Blaze "The Champ"

Day26 singles chronology
"Since You've Been Gone" (2008)	"Imma Put It on Her" (2009)	"Stadium Music" (2009)

Diddy singles chronology
"Take You There" (2008)	"Imma Put It on Her" (2009)	"Must Be Love" (2009)

Yung Joc singles chronology
"Beep" (2008)	"Imma Put It on Her" (2009)	"Yeah Boy" (2010)

"Imma Put It on Her" is the first single from the American R&B boy band Day26's second studio album, Forever in a Day. It features Diddy and Yung Joc. Willie Taylor, Robert Curry, & Que share lead vocals, with Brian Angel and Big Mike providing ad libs.

== Song information ==
The song was produced by Blaze "The Champ" and was released digitally on iTunes on March 31, 2009, with a pre-order of the album Forever in a Day. Though a leaked version of the song containing only Day26 had been leaked in late February 2009, the updated album version features Diddy and Yung Joc. The song was written by Day26.

== Music video ==
A video for the song was shot in early March 2009 in Miami, Florida, with director Rage and was released on April 2, 2009, on Day-26.com and Mtv.com. It ranked at #77 on BET's Notarized: Top 100 Videos of 2009 countdown.

== Official versions ==
- Album version
- Radio Edit
- Instrumental
- Capo Decina Remix

== Chart information ==
Since its release on the iTunes Store, the song has reached #5 on the R&B/Soul chart and #55 on the Top 100 Songs chart.

The single entered the Billboard Hot R&B/Hip-Hop Songs chart at number 98 on the issue date of April 11, 2009. The following week it entered on the Billboard Bubbling Under Hot 100 Singles chart at number 11 which equates to 111 on the Billboard Hot 100.

The song went on to peak at #79 on the Billboard Hot 100 and #29 on the Billboard R&B/Hip-Hop Songs and Airplay charts.

=== Weekly charts ===
Chart (2009)	Peak position
U.S. Billboard Hot 100	79
U.S. Billboard Hot R&B/Hip-Hop Songs	29
U.S. Billboard Hot R&B/Hip-Hop Airplay	29

=== Year-end charts ===
Chart (2009)	Position
US Hot R&B/Hip-Hop Songs (Billboard)	98
