= Ramon Del Barrio =

American actor

Ramon Del Barrio (née Ramon G. del Barrio, May 9, 1964 in New York); also known as Raymond Del Barrio, is an American performer, choreographer, dancer and singer.

== Career ==
Barrio has worked as a director and a choreographer for an American boy-band O-Town (J Records) on ABC’s primetime hit Making the Band.

Barrio has performed in Chita Rivera’s A Legendary Celebration on Broadway for BC/EFA, creating the role of Damon Runyon in the Broadway revival of Guys and Dolls. He also performed in the Las Vegas production of Jersey Boys. Among his tours are Chita Rivera: The Dancer’s Life and the 30th-anniversary tour of West Side Story, in which he played Chino, and Whitney Houston’s Moment of Truth World Tour. His film and television appearances include co-star on Rob Schneider’s CBS sitcom Rob, The Mambo Kings, Sister Act 2, Robin Hood: Men in Tights, Footloose, Solid Gold Hits, the Academy, Grammy, and American Music awards shows. He also appeared on NBC Palm Springs for NBCare tapings.
