= Ron Norsworthy =

American visual artist and designer

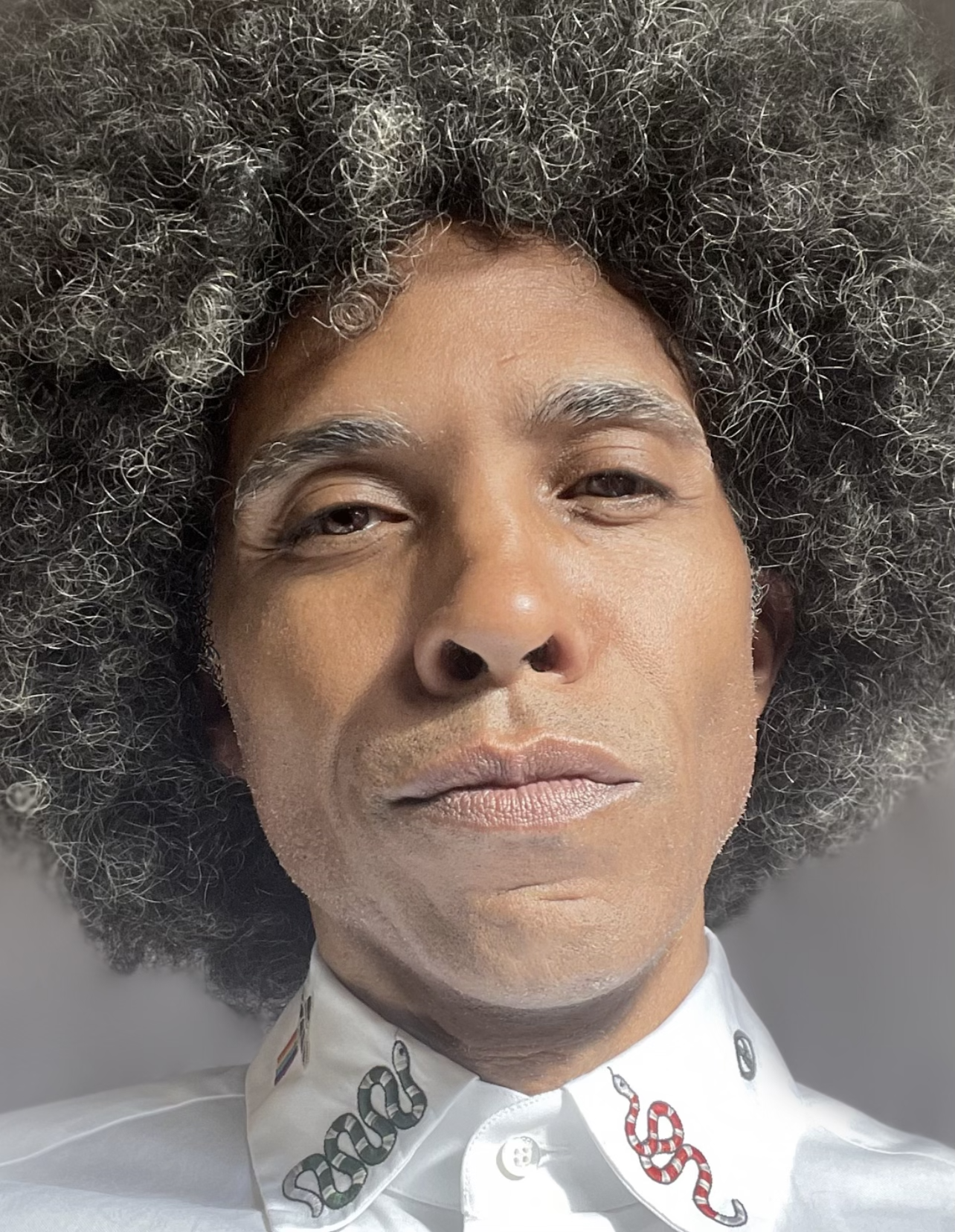
- Norsworthy in 2022
- Born: South Bend, Indiana, U.S.
- Education: Princeton University
- Known for: Visual art & design, Production design
- Website: ronnorsworthy.com

Ron Norsworthy is an American visual artist and designer. He previously worked in art direction and production design for film, television, music videos, and commercial projects. Norsworthy's work employs notions of spaces and decoration of space as narratives about his lived experience as a queer person of color as well as that of his community/communities. In addition to his solo practice, Norsworthy is part of DARNstudio, an art collaboration with his husband and fellow artist, David Anthone. His work is included in the collections of the Newark Museum of Art, New-York Historical Society, the International Quilt Museum, and Museum of Contemporary Photography.

His visual art includes layered relief collages, textiles, decorative objects, and installations that address architecture, domestic space, memory, identity, design, and Black and queer experience.

== Early life ==
Norsworthy was born in South Bend, Indiana and was raised in Iowa and Illinois. He earned a Bachelor of Arts in Architecture, cum laude, from Princeton University. He began his career working as a designer for the architect Michael Graves.

== Career ==
=== Production design ===
Norsworthy worked professionally in art direction and production design art direction and production design for film, television, music videos, commercials, and live performances.

He was production designer for music videos and televised performances for artists such as Britney Spears, Missy Elliott, Salt-N-Pepa, Erykah Badu, Madonna, Destiny's Child, Busta Rhymes, Aretha Franklin, Jay-Z, Mariah Carey, Sean Combs (P. Diddy), and the Fugees. These projects encompass a two decade span in which Norsworthy designed films, videos, and commercials, working with directors Matthew Rolston, Hype Williams, Spike Lee, Joseph Kahn, Paul Hunter, Gina Prince-Bythewood, and Millicent Shelton. He was elected and served on the New York Chapter Board of Governors for the Grammy Awards from 1999 to 2000.

Norsworthy's art has been exhibited in galleries and institutions. His work was shown at the Studio Museum in Harlem as part of the exhibition "Harlemworld: Metropolis as Metaphor" organized by curator Thelma Golden in 2004. His piece, entitled "Reparation Tower, Harlem", was a full-scaled sales office for a luxury high-rise in the form of an upraised fist. The installation and exhibition were favorably reviewed by architecture critic Herbert Mitchell Muschamp in The New York Times who described the work as "... a symbol of defiance aimed at indifference. But the symbol is handsomely fitted with interiors that signify bourgeois complacency... the views from within must be fabulous."

He was the CEO and founder of The Norsworthy Fund (2005–2010), a multidisciplinary design studio whose work included residential interiors, experiential design, product design, and creative direction. His interior-design work included projects featured on The Tyra Banks Show.

In 2011, he launched N Home, a home furnishings collection developed in partnership with television shopping channel QVC (UK). Norsworthy also appeared as an on-air presenter for the collection, which was sold through QVC UK until 2014.

=== Visual art ===
Norsworthy creates layered relief collages combining photography, sculpture, digital painting, and architectural construction. His works are developed from digitally composed images that are cut, layered, and assembled onto plywood supports, giving the compositions both photographic and sculptural qualities.

His work examines domestic and constructed spaces as sites of memory, performance, belonging, and cultural narrative.

Critic Seph Rodney, writing in The New York Times, described Norsworthy's approach in terms of identity-centered placemaking, examining how different aspects of identity can coexist within constructed spaces. Reviews in The Brooklyn Rail and Musée Magazine have discussed his use of layered domestic interiors to explore memory, aspiration, cultural identity, and ideas of permanence and belonging.

=== Collaborative projects ===
Norsworthy is part of DARNstudio, an art collaboration with his husband and fellow artist, David Anthone. Together, they have produced collaborative works including, Another Country: A Quilt Cycle (2018), Heirlooms: Works from the Another Country Quilt Cycle (2020), and G.O.A.T. The Art Game, a permanent installation, Newark Museum of Art in 2023.

His work has been reviewed or featured in publications, including Hyperallergic, The Brooklyn Rail, and Surface Magazine. He has appeared in interviews, including CBS Saturday Morning.

Norsworthy's work has also appeared in documentary productions, including The 1619 Project and Wu-Tang Clan: Of Mics and Men.

=== Exhibitions ===
==== Solo exhibitions ====
- American Dream, Edwynn Houk Gallery, New York, 2025
- I, Narcissus, Edwynn Houk Gallery, New York, 2024
- Interior Dialogue, Long Gallery Harlem, New York, 2021
- Tell a Lie About Me, I'll Tell the Truth About You, Project for Empty Space, Newark, 2021

=== Selected group exhibitions ===
His work has also been exhibited at institutions including the New-York Historical Society, Visual Arts Center of New Jersey, Bemis Center for Contemporary Arts, Hudson River Museum, Mattatuck Museum, Newark Museum of Art, Tang Teaching Museum, and International Quilt Museum.

=== Public Art ===
Norsworthy has also completed public art commissions, including:

- Ceiling mural, United Airlines Lounge, Newark Liberty International Airport, 2023
- Immersive mural and light installation, Audible headquarters, Newark, 2022

== Work ==
=== TV shows & specials ===
- BET Spring Bling 2006 (Miami)
- ‘Making The Band', TV Show, MTV Networks
- That's What I'm Talking About, TV Land Networks
- “Spring Break” 2004 Miami, Florida, MTV Networks
- “Madonna Live and On The Record”, MTV Networks
- Summer Beach House Kick Off Party, MTV Networks
- MTV Spring Break 2005 Cancun, MTV Networks
- Like a Virgin/Hollywood Medley, 2003 MTV Music Video Awards, MTV Networks
- “Direct Effect Presents: Fashionably Loud”, MTV Networks
- TRL @ Your School, TV Special, MTV Networks
- Toni Braxton "You're Makin' Me High", 1997 American Music Awards
- National Christmas Tree Lighting Ceremony, 2009

=== Selected films ===
- Dead Presidents (1995), art director
- Crooklyn (1994/1995), assistant art director
- John Henrik Clarke: A Great and Mighty Walk (1996), production designer

=== Music videos ===
- "Sinkin' In", Lisa Marie Presley, director: Barnabus
- "Sexual (Li Da Di)", Amber, director: Ron Norsworthy
- "Supernatural", Wild Orchid, director: Ron Norsworthy
- "(Shorty) Swing My Way", K.P. & Envyi, director: Ron Norsworthy
- "All I Need", Fat Joe, director: Gina Prince Bythewood
- "Woo Hah!! Got You All in Check", Busta Rhymes, Director: Hype Williams
- "Bag Lady", Erykah Badu, director: Erykah Badu
- "Through the Rain", Mariah Carey, director: Joseph Kahn
- "Put Your Hands Where My Eyes Can See", Busta Rhymes, director: Hype Williams
- "Mo' Money Mo' Problems", Notorious B.I.G. f/ P. Diddy & Mase, director: Hype Williams
- "I Believe I Can Fly", R Kelly, director: Hype Williams
- "It's All About the Benjamins", P Diddy featuring Lil' Kim and The Lox, director: Paul Hunter
- "The Rain (Supa Dupa Fly)", Missy Elliott, director: Hype Williams
- "Loungin'", LL Cool J, director: Hype Williams
- "A Rose is Still a Rose", Aretha Franklin, director: Lauryn Hill
- "Phone Tap", The Firm, director: Nick Quested
- "Take it to the Streets", Rampage, director: Darren Grant
- "If I Ruled the World", Nas featuring Lauryn Hill, director: Hype Williams
- "Killing Me Softly", The Fugees, director: Earle Sebastian
- "1nce Again", A Tribe Called Quest, director: Hype Williams
- "Jazzybelle", Outkast, director: Bille Woodruff
- "I'll Be", Foxy Brown featuring Jay-Z, director: Brett Ratner
- "I Don't Want To Lose You", Toni Braxton, director: Bille Woodruff
- "That Girl", Maxi Priest featuring Shaggy, director: Hype Williams
- "Let's Talk About Sex", Salt ‘n Pepa, director: Millicent Shelton
- "The Weakness In Me", Melissa Etheridge, director: Maria Maggenti
- "You Sang To Me", Marc Anthony, director: Jeff Richter

=== Awards and residencies ===
- Artistic Excellence Fellowship Grant, Connecticut Office of the Arts, 2018
- Artist residency, Project for Empty Space, 2020
- Newark Artist Accelerator Grant (Project for Empty Space / Andy Warhol Foundation support), 2021
- Artist residency, Bemis Center for Contemporary Arts, 2022
- Changemaker Award, Visual Arts Center of New Jersey, 2022
- MacDowell Fellowship, 2023

=== Critical reception ===
Critics have discussed Norsworthy's work in relation to his background in architecture, production design, and contemporary visual art. In a 2025 profile for Essence, Killian Wright-Jackson described the interdisciplinary character of his practice and its development from his earlier work in design and creative direction.

Norsworthy has also been associated with Afrofuturist approaches in contemporary art. In 2025, L'Officiel USA included him in its selection of Afrofuturist artists, while Whitehot Magazine discussed Afrofuturist and Afropessimist elements in his work.

== Personal life ==
He is married to David Anthone and lives and works between Connecticut and Mexico.
