= Since You've Been Gone (Day26 song) =

Single by Day26

from the album Day26
- Released: June 9, 2008
- Genre: R&B
- Length: 4:10
- Label: Bad Boy; Atlantic
- Songwriters: Kendrick Dean, Bryan-Michael Cox, Adonis Shropshire
- Producers: Bryan-Michael Cox, Adonis Shropshire

Day26 singles chronology
| "Got Me Going" (2008) | "Since You've Been Gone" (2008) | "Imma Put It on Her" (2009) |

"Since You've Been Gone" is the second single by American R&B boy-band Day26 from their debut album. The song was produced by Bryan-Michael Cox. Willie Taylor, Brian Angel, Robert Curry, and Big Mike share lead vocals.

== Music video ==
The video was directed by Erik White and takes place in a hotel. It begins with the group entering the hotel and on top of the roof of the hotel in the daytime. The first solo scene is Willie on a couch in his hotel room singing a verse with a chain in his hand which was from his ex-girlfriend. The chorus takes place on the roof and the lobby of the hotel where they are all singing together. The second solo scene contains Brian in a vacant bar with only the bartender. In Qwanell's solo scene he is on his bed where Dawn Richard of Danity Kane plays his love interest. She is behind him rubbing him and teasing him. The last verse is where Robert is inside his hotel room playing the piano by himself. Lastly, Mike is sitting beside a pool where his ex is in the pool. The video continues with the group on the roof of the hotel but it is now nighttime. The video ends with the group coming off the elevator and seeing their ex-girlfriends. The video premiered on June 27, 2008, on FNMTV. It was added on YouTube on June 27, 2008, and has so far received over 500,000 views.

== Charts ==
The single made some progress on the Hot R&B/Hip Hop Singles chart peaking at number 52 but was still 22 places lower than the group's debut single Got Me Going. The song also failed to enter the Billboard Hot 100 or the Bubbling Under Hot 100 charts.

| Chart (2008) | Peak position |
|---|---|
| US Hot R&B/Hip-Hop Songs (Billboard) | 52 |
