= Making the Band =

American reality television series

- Created by: Lou Pearlman; Mary-Ellis Bunim; Jonathan Murray; Andrew Marek
- No. of seasons: 12
- No. of episodes: 142

Production
- Executive producers: Lou Pearlman (ABC version); Sean Combs (MTV version); Jonathan Murray; Mary-Ellis Bunim
- Running time: 60 min
- Production companies: Bunim/Murray Productions (2000–2003); Trans Continental Pictures (2000–2004); Bad Boy Films (2002–2009); The Ted & Perry Company (2009); MTV Productions (2000-2001); MTV Series Entertainment (2002–2009)

Original release
- Network: ABC (2000–2001); MTV (2001–2009)
- Release: March 24, 2000 – October 10, 2009

Making the Band is an ABC/MTV reality television series that exists in separate iterations, each focusing on a specific music act. It spawned musical acts O-Town, Da Band, Danity Kane, Day26, and Donnie Klang. Except for the first iteration of the series featuring O-Town, all seasons of Making the Band have been overseen by Diddy, acting as the man of the house who makes the final decision on who will be in the band. MTV announced on July 15, 2019, that the series was revived and would premiere in 2020, which was then postponed to 2021 due to the global COVID-19 pandemic. However, this never materialized.

The company was originally conceived for ABC and it was produced by MTV, but ABC later cancelled the series.

== Making the Band: O-Town ==
The first iteration of Making the Band started on March 24, 2000, and aired for three seasons, finishing on March 30, 2002. It centered around the musical group O-Town.

The first season aired on ABC. Making the Band was the last new series, and the only series that was not a sitcom, to air during the original run of the TGIF block. The block ended its run upon the end of the series' first season in 2000. Making the Band was then relocated to cable television network MTV, where two additional seasons aired. Future iterations of the show also aired on MTV. O-Town's return for additional seasons marked the first time the main cast of a reality show returned for a second season.

=== Season 1 ===
In 1999, Lou Pearlman, the man responsible for the formation of the Backstreet Boys and NSYNC, embarked on a nationwide talent search, cutting auditions in eight cities down to 25 young men, and eventually to eight finalists. These eight young men would compete for five spots in Pearlman's newest boy band creation, to be signed to his record label, Transcontinental Records.

The season chronicled the competition between the men in typical reality-show fashion. It featured on screen choreography by Ramon Del Barrio. Midway through the first season, three of the eight men (Paul Martin, Mike Miller and Bryan Chan) were eliminated, leaving Ashley Parker Angel, Jacob Underwood, Erik-Michael Estrada (not to be confused with American actor Erik Estrada), Trevor Penick, and Ikaika Kahoano. These five were set to become O-Town and the process of producing their first CD began. Several episodes later, however, Kahoano left for reasons that weren't exactly clear. Kahoano later stated that he "did not respect the other members on a musical or personal level" and described the experience as "wack". He later joined Making the Band semi-finalist Mike Miller and Bryan Chan to form the boy-band LMNT. Selecting from the original group of 25 semi-finalists, the remaining four members of the band chose Dan Miller to be Kahoano's replacement. With the final member of O-Town in place, the remainder of the first season tracked the development and struggles with the new band.

=== Seasons 2–3 ===
The second and third seasons continued to track the development of O-Town as a pop group, following tours, performances, and other seminal events in the band's history. Such events included the development of their second CD, O2, their transition to a new record label, Clive Davis' J Records, and an ongoing struggle to "prove themselves" as legitimate artists.

== Making the Band 2: Da Band ==
The second iteration of Making the Band started on October 19, 2002, and aired for three seasons, finishing on April 29, 2004. It centered around the musical group Da Band and was filmed in various spaces around Manhattan all designed by noted visual artist and designer Ron Norsworthy.

=== Season 1 ===
In 2002, a new talent search had begun, this time by P. Diddy. Diddy sought to find the best rappers and singers from which to assemble a new hip-hop group. After weeks of selection and training P. Diddy chose the members of the band (Sara Rivers, Dylan Dilinjah, Frederick (Freddy P) Watson, Rodney (Chopper) Hill, Lloyd (Ness) Mathis and Lynese (Babs) Wiley) on the first season of Making the Band 2.

Orlando (OG) Goodman, Walter (Hammin) Anderson, Kimberly (Mysterious) Bert now known as Misty Blanco, Belinda (Pocahantas) Carter, Damone Coleman, Jamie Huy, Yazmin Mendez, Jonessa Monique, Mina Monroe, Allah Ricks and Jamirah Turner did not make the cut.

=== Season 2 ===
For several weeks, the contestants lived together and were subjected to difficult tasks, including walking from Midtown Manhattan to Brooklyn to purchase cheesecake for Diddy and reciting the Notorious B.I.G.'s Juicy and the Sugarhill Gang's Rapper's Delight out loud in the Bad Boy Records office. Many altercations between members also took place throughout the season. The finalists were then named Da Band.

Their debut album, Too Hot for TV, was released in September 2003. Their first single was "Bad Boy This, Bad Boy That", and their second was "Tonight". The album was certified gold, selling 600,000 copies.

=== Season 3 ===
Da Band effectively ended its career at the end of the third season of the show, when P. Diddy dissolved the group during the season finale. However, he still wanted to work with Babs and Ness, calling them hip hop's next "Bonnie and Clyde". Babs went on the promote the underground rap battle "Queen of the Ring" featured on YouTube and Ness was able to release a song called "My Hood" under the name E. Ness, though it did not chart. Though not selected to be chosen to stay at the end of season 3, Diddy also kept Chopper, now known as Young City. Chopper was then signed to Bad Boy South. Sara Stokes, Frederick and Dylan John were the remaining three members of Da Band to be dropped completely from Bad Boy.

== Making the Band 3: Danity Kane ==
The third iteration of Making the Band started on March 3, 2005, and aired for three seasons, finishing on August 10, 2006. It centered on the musical group Danity Kane. Home base interiors were again designed by Ron Norsworthy.

=== Season 1 ===
After the failure of Bad Boy's Da Band, P. Diddy returned with Making the Band 3 in 2004. This time, he was on the look for the next girl group. With the help of Laurieann Gibson, Doc and Johnny, he set out on a multi city search to find girls who had everything: a great voice, dancing ability and most importantly the looks. The theme song "Oh La La" was recorded by Bad Boy singer Cheri Dennis.

==== Results ====
Competitors	Result
Tyra, Paschan, Celeste	Eliminated in episode 2 for failing to satisfy in terms of dancing
Leslie	Eliminated in episode 2 as the judges felt that her solo aspirations and attitude would interfere with the chemistry of the future group
Michelle	Left in episode 7 to go back to school
Lavantae, Patty	Eliminated in episode 8 for failing to satisfy in terms of dancing and performing
Roxanne^{1}, Erika (Bunny), Kristen, Leche, Bethany	Eliminated in episode 9 for failing to satisfy in terms of dancing
Yahaira, Shantee	Eliminated in episode 10 for failing to satisfy in terms of singing to a crowd
Mylah, Aileen, Martii, Francesca	Were not considered good enough for the group on Season 2
Aundrea, Aubrey, Malika	Kept by Diddy after episode 10 to continue for a second season. They didn't make the band but were considered good enough to have another shot at Making the Band.

^1 Roxanne was cut by Laurie Ann.

=== Season 2 ===
The band performed at the Backstreet Boys concert at the Nissan Pavilion on August 6, 2005. There were two groups. Group one, named "SHE (She Has Everything)", included Aubrey, Melissa, Denosh, Jasmine, and Kelli. Group two, named "Chain 6", included Aundrea, Dawn, Shannon, Wanita, Dominique, and Taquita. During dress rehearsal, group one was the favorite according to Dave, Laurie Anne and Doc. However, the first group was booed as they gave their performance because Denosh started off key on the a cappella which led Aubrey to go off key in the beginning of the song. The second group won, as many screaming girls yelled for them.

The song that each contestant sang in the studio "Tell Me" was actually used by Diddy on his album Press Play. Instead of one of the members of the group who originally sang the song on the show appearing on the track, the vocals are done by Christina Aguilera.

==== Results ====
Competitors	Result
Nicole Palmeri, Sammy, Tokiko	Eliminated in episode 2 for failing to satisfy in terms of singing
Amber, Malika, Jennifer	Eliminated in episode 3 for failing to satisfy in terms of dancing
Tiffany	Withdrew in episode 4 due to a hip injury; it was later revealed that she lied about her age, using a cousin's driver's license to audition for the show. Her real name is Dav'rielle Smith
Chelsea	Eliminated in episode 4 for failing to satisfy in terms of performance
Cindy, Kaui	Eliminated in episode 6 for failing in terms of being able to upkeep a good level of dancing at an unprepared time
Jasmine Burke, Melissa Smith, Kelli Maria, Dominique Young, Denosh Bennet, TaQuita Thorns	Failed to make it into the band in Episode 10
Aubrey, Wanita, Shannon, Dawn, Aundrea	Made it into the band in Episode 10

The finale took place on Tuesday, November 15, 2005, where the 11 contestants left competed for five spots in the band. The 11 finalists; Aundrea, Aubrey, Dawn, Jasmine, TaQuita Thorns, Denosh, Wanita, Shannon, Melissa, Kelli, and Dominique, were sent home for three months, told to polish up, and return for the final stretch. When the girls returned after their three-month hiatus, they had to perform numerous acts such as radio interviews, a photo shoot, and dance all of their old dance routines. As Diddy's crew chooses the group, all of the girls went on a last dinner.

They decided on the name Danity Kane. The band's self-titled debut album was released in stores on August 22, 2006, and peaked at #1 on the Billboard charts within its first three weeks of release.

=== Season 3 ===
==== Episodes ====
No.	Description
1	The band goes to Dawn's hometown New Orleans. They see the destruction Hurricane Katrina did to New Orleans and Debbie Richard's (Dawn Richard's mother) Dance Studio. They visit Dawn's old high school and donate $5,000. They also make the Mardi Gras parades, where they ride one of the floats, throwing out Mardi Gras beads.
2	The band prepares for their first performance, at the Mercury Room during NBA All-Star Weekend in Houston, Texas. They perform a 20-minute set consisting of three songs, but only two are shown: "She Has Everything" and "Ooh La, La". Their first performance was not well received by the crowd or Diddy.
3	The girls work with vocal coach Betty Wright doing different voice training sessions. Diddy decides that Shannon needs the most work vocally. Towards the end of the show, Diddy tells Shannon that she needs to show that she can sing and not hold back. Shannon starts crying as she sings and ends up showing that she really can sing. On the other hand, Aundrea and Shannon discover a mouse in a pile of clothes. Dawn calls an exterminator to fix the "mouse problem".
4	The girls do more dance training, meet with Atlantic records staff, do more vocal training, and meet with Ms. Jones. The girls take a minute to give her a live performance, but the interview turns sour when Ms. Jones says that only Dawn, Wanita, and Aundrea can sing. Aubrey takes this to heart, and is hurt by the comment. Diddy wants to send Aubrey home because she has a cold he doesn't want the other girls to catch. Aubrey wants to stay, saying the group needs her. Later, she doesn't get to help the girls write a song Diddy wants them to make.
5	The girls finally initiated the recording sessions for their album. Diddy said that he was "Proud of the progress" that the girls had made and that they were ready to begin recording. Once in the studio they worked with Producer Scott Storch and vocal producer, Pooh Bear. The girls started on the song entitled, "Sleep On It". Dawn doesn't shine during the recording session. Her voice range is low and the song requires higher notes to be sung. She works through it and with a little encouragement form the rest of the group and Pooh Bear, she manages to sound great by the end of the episode. The girls are well on their way.
6	The band goes into the studio to record two brand new songs with Brian Cox. "One Shot" and "Ride For You". Aubrey's part of one of the verses for "Ride For You" was cut. She was very upset and thought she didn't sound bad. Diddy told her she didn't have enough emotion for the song. He said he wanted to cry when he heard the song and Aubrey's emotion on the record didn't cut it. They went to record a second song and everyone noticed that Aubrey wasn't on that song either. Dawn was very concerned with Aubrey so she goes to Johnny and tells him about the problem. Johnny says he can't do anything about it, that it's the producers song. The girls record some more parts for "Sleep On It". They meet back up with Pooh Bear and Scott Storch and recorded great music. Aundrea is having boyfriend issues.
7	While working in the studio, the girls work on a new song. A new leader rises from the group, Aundrea, when the girls choose her to lead "Hold Me Down". Also, the girls perform at Village Underground where they perform "Ride For You". But, Aundrea's boyfriend, Rudy, then breaks up with her because she did not call him the night before. All the girls are shocked to hear about this, while Aundrea gets very upset with this but the girls give their support.
8	First, the girls move into a beautiful house in Los Angeles. Then, they go and do a lot of radio interviews. They reveal their name, which is Danity Kane. Some look to be shocked by this name, and all ask what it means. Then, the girls are working on their choreography for their video. But, Laurie Ann, their choreographer, get very mad at the girls because they do not know the real version of the song for "Show Stopper". The girls then go to film their first music video which is "Show Stopper". They have to try to get the video done in one day, but they fall behind schedule. They do manage to get the video done in one day, and the video turns out great.
9	The girls must reschedule their first concert as Danity Kane after disastrous weather strikes their location. The girls have their concert the following day and perform songs from their album, including "One Shot", "Want It", "Right Now", and "Show Stopper".

== Making the Band 4: Day26 and Donnie Klang ==
The fourth iteration of Making the Band started on June 18, 2007, and aired for three seasons, finishing on April 23, 2009. It focused on the musical acts Day26 and Donnie Klang. Season 1 was filmed in a midtown Manhattan with interiors designed by noted visual artist and designer Ron Norsworthy.

=== Season 1 ===
Diddy begins his search for an all-male super group. This all-male band is widely believed to be the new version of 112 or New Edition as reported earlier in the season. The season began on June 18, 2007, at 9:00 p.m. The band was finally made on August 26, 2007, consisting of five males from their late teens to their early-to-mid-20s.

==== Episodes ====
No.	Description
1	A panel of judges travel across the country to find men with the most potential of being in a successful men's performing group. Diddy picks 20 men and eliminates the other 38.
2	The men are split up into five groups of four and choose a song to perform for Diddy and the other judges. During an intense work out session, Dyshon gets sick and is taken to the hospital. Mike is chastised by Diddy for his lack of commitment to getting in shape, while Dan is praised for hiring a personal trainer and losing 16 lbs since the first audition. Also, Chris is told from Diddy that he is in fact the weakest singer. During a vocal session, the guys open up to each other and learns, Chris' grandfather died and he never had the chance to say goodbye and that his grandfather would have been proud of his accomplishments. Also we learn Dan is in love and Donnie has a soulful passion in his music, which he describes as "strong love".
3	Diddy gives the contestants a grueling series of tasks to take place around New York, including buying cheesecake, that must be completed as a team. The majority of the contestants complete most of the tasks, earning Diddy's congratulations. After their performances, an impressed Diddy decides to cut only four of the guys rather than ten, including men who did not participate in the tasks and men who failed to perform well.
4	Diddy surprises the contestants by revealing he will continue searching for new talent, namely four new performers. Eleven applicants impress Diddy and his team, earning a spot on the team. The new contestants are given a tour of the house, where the established competitors are caught napping. Angered at their lack of motivation, Diddy initiates a competition on the spot to determine who will remain on the show. The result is the release of a few originals.
5	The guys get off to a rocky start, as the old guys don't trust the new guys right away. They soon "warm up" to each other as they engage in a 5-mile run issued by Diddy. Robert's girlfriend calls and the conversation ends in a hostile break-up. Michael loses an amazing 11 pounds at a workout session and seems to be keeping it off with his eating habits. Ankh Ra splits the boys into groups and has them perform a song for him, and later Diddy. The main conflict is Robert losing rehearsal time due to spending an hour mending his relationship on the phone. Diddy is stumped at elimination and does not cut anyone due to the excellent performances, to the surprise of all. He then turns the tables and chooses Dan, Donnie, Robert, Dyshon, DeAngelo, and Willie to choose who goes. Only two guys, not surprisingly, both new leave, Jeremic and Devin.
6	The guys are tested in a series of physical tests including basketball and boxing (Coach Jason Strout). Jonathan has a hard time keeping up with the rest during the "losers' run", only to get his nose busted from his "brother" Qwanell. During a difficult dance routine with Laurie Ann, Jonathan realizes that maybe joining this competition wasn't his calling. So during their routine, he tells his fellow members that he will no longer be continuing on with them on their journey. While dancing solo, Julius hears a pop. He is taken to the hospital and told he has a sprained ligament. At eliminations, Donnie questions Diddy's decision on putting him in the "can't dance group", but surprisingly makes the cut. Diddy gets upset when he has to make his cut because he realizes that Laurie Ann didn't follow his orders to have the guys rehearse all weekend instead of just for eight hours the day of the cut. In the end, Diddy cuts a total of five guys: Armando, Dan, Andrae, Eric, and Curtiss. There are 12 guys left.
7	It's almost the finale & the guys are being tested on their dancing, singing, and overall performance—the total package. The boys get a new choreographer named Jamal, and they seem to like him better than Laurie Ann because he actually breaks the dance steps down slowly until each guy gets it. Julius is still frustrated about his leg injury, because there is an upcoming elimination that will include dancing, and he is forced to sit in the dance studio while the other guys learn new choreography. Donnie is also stressed about his dancing because last week Diddy stated that he can't dance at all, but Jamal says it's just in his head; don't let what other people say about white boys get to your head, and he appreciates the support from his new dance coach. He later receives dance tips from Qwanell and Carlos, which seems to have helped him boost his confidence immensely. We learn Carlos' fiancée is pregnant, but he later receives news that their baby may be born with down syndrome. As the guys get ready for elimination night, Donnie puts on an outfit, asking one of the other guys if this outfit made him look like more of a dancer. They go to Spotlight to perform for Diddy, who will be basing tonight's information on dancing, singing, performance, improvement, determination, and their past weeks here in New York. Carlos' group is first to perform, and Diddy quickly stops the dancing performance and asks the group to sing again because he doesn't think Carlos gave his best. They dance again, and he still doesn't look satisfied. Carlos can't balance his personal problems with the competition, even though he says he wants this more than anything. When Julius's group performs their dance routine, Julius is having trouble with the dance because he hasn't practiced nearly enough as his group members, and Diddy again asks his group to redo it. When Donnie performs his choreography with his group, he states that he believes what Diddy said was just a test, because if Diddy thought he couldn't dance at all, why wouldn't he have just cut him right away? He believes Diddy did it to get him to work twice as hard as his bandmates, and wants to prove him better than the guys that already left and the guys still here. Diddy seems to like his group's performance, especially Big Mike because he looks like he's enjoying dancing for Diddy. When it is time to individually perform vocally, Carlos and Julius both struggle; Diddy asked Carlos if he even knew the words of the song, and Julius began to fumble more and more as he performed. In the end, only Julius and Carlos were cut. The guys were then told to go home for two months and come back looking like superstars. Choice of Group (when looking over head shots, in episode 7) Diddy tells each judge to pick their group. This is the result: Bivins: Robert, Willie, Michael, Donnie Cox (producer): Robert, Willie, Brian A., Donnie Slam: Robert, Jeremy, Brian A., Qwanell Ankh Ra (Vocal coach): Robert, Jeremy, Brian A., Qwanell Jamal (choreographer): Robert, Willie, Donnie, Qwanell
8	After all the contestants arrive back from their long break at home they are immediately reunited together at the airport with all 10 members. DeAngelo comes back with his braces fully removed, and Mike "Big Mike" comes back with a brand new look and in much better shape. The guys reveal what they did over their break as some reveal they performed, worked on their voices, and took dance classes. The guys meet back up in the same park where they are informed that they will be performing at the Beacon Theatre where they will open up for New Edition in front of a sold-out crowd. The guys go to meet Ankah to practice their songs and work on their voices and are put into two groups. One group is called 5th City and the second group is called Flo. The guys are introduced at the concert by Slam and immediately the show begins. After the performance the groups are rated by the crowd with the crowd cheering the loudest for Flo. The remaining 10 people receive information that they will receive makeovers and be featured in a Sean John photo shoot. After the photo shoot the guys leave to meet Diddy for the final cut. Diddy and his entourage meet in a room to deliberate on people who could possibly make the band and he reveals his feelings towards certain people and his ideas, until he tells the camera man to turn the camera off. At the final meeting place where the guys meet Diddy who has surprisingly arrived before them are told to stand in line against the wall. Diddy begins by calling people out and making them stand in line and sending people back and forth rearranging the group until he calls for music. He tells them to sing. After all the guys sing they are immediately shocked by Diddys walking out of the room without saying anything. The episode comes to a close with a message from Diddy telling everyone he needs help deciding who the group should be. He encouraged all viewers to log onto the MTV website and vote for their favorite finalist, with the results to be revealed on the live finale.
9	On the live finale, the finalists performed a snippet of "If It Isn't Love" and a ballad version of their theme song "I Want You Exclusive". Yung Joc performed and Danity Kane made a special appearance. Dyshon was the first to leave, followed by Brian Harris. Afterwards the band was finally made and Robert, Willie, Qwanell, Brian Andrews, and Mike were called to be in the band. Donnie, who came in first, followed by Willie and Mike in the voting ballots, was offered a solo artist contract on the Bad Boy label by Diddy because he showed such persistence throughout the show.

==== Diddy's Call-Out ====
Order	Episodes							
Order	1&2	3	4	5	6	7	8	9
1	Donnie	Donnie	Donnie	Donnie	Donnie	Donnie	Donnie	Donnie
2	DeAngelo	DeAngelo	DeAngelo	DeAngelo	DeAngelo	DeAngelo	DeAngelo	DeAngelo
3	Willie	Willie	Willie	Willie	Willie	Willie	Willie	Willie
4	Qwanell	Qwanell	Qwanell	Qwanell	Qwanell	Qwanell	Qwanell	Qwanell
5	Brian A.	Brian A.	Brian A.	Brian A.	Brian A.	Brian A.	Brian A.	Brian A.
6	Michael	Michael	Michael	Michael	Michael	Michael	Michael	Michael
7	Robert	Robert	Robert	Robert	Robert	Robert	Robert	Robert
8			Jeremy	Jeremy	Jeremy	Jeremy	Jeremy	Jeremy
9	Brian H.	Brian H.	Brian H.	Brian H.	Brian H.	Brian H.	Brian H.	Brian H.
10	Dyshon	Dyshon	Dyshon	Dyshon	Dyshon	Dyshon	Dyshon	Dyshon
11	Carlos	Carlos	Carlos	Carlos	Carlos	Carlos		
12	Julius	Julius	Julius	Julius	Julius	Julius		
13	Jonathan	Jonathan	Jonathan	Jonathan	Jonathan			
14	Armando	Armando	Armando	Armando	Armando			
15	Dan	Dan	Dan	Dan	Dan			
16			Andrae	Andrae	Andrae			
17			Curtiss	Curtiss	Curtiss			
18			Eric	Eric	Eric			
19			Devin	Devin				
20			Jeremic	Jeremic				
21	Lewis	Lewis	Lewis					
22	Chris	Chris	Chris					
23	Makio	Makio						
24	Tyrice	Tyrice						
25	Maurice	Maurice						
26	Anzeo	Anzeo						

Given Solo Contract with Bad Boy
Made the Band
Eliminated
Entered the House
Safe
Finalists
Quit

=== Season 2 ===
Season 2 showed the Making the Band 4 winners and Donnie's debut albums along with Danity Kane's second album coming together. There was a "Making the Band" tour with Danity Kane, the Making the Band 4 winners, and Donnie. They all moved into the same house and record their new albums and got to know each other a lot more. This was the debut of Danity Kane's second album and Making the Band 4 winners.

The Making the Band 4 boys have a song out called "Got Me Going" (lead single off their debut album). Danity Kane has a confirmed lead single called "Damaged". Fans voted between it and another song, "Pretty Boy". Donnie Klang also has out a song called "Take You There". Both "Damaged" and "Got Me Going" were released to all digital music stores on January 29, 2008.

The group's official name was revealed as Day26 On the February 4, 2008 episode of TRL the boys explained that Day 26 is the band name because August 26, 2007 was the day that they became a band.

==== Episodes ====
No.	Name	Original airdate	Description
1	The Battle of the Sexes	01/28/08	The new Band and solo artist Donnie meet in New York as they prepare to start their albums, unaware Diddy is also bringing Danity Kane into the mix.
2	B@#$%assness	02/04/08	The Band struggles to work together, Robert clashes with D. Woods, and Dawn and Que discover they have a lot in common.
3	The Battle Track	02/11/08	Diddy forces Danity Kane and the Band to square off in a competition for a new track, but the outcome surprises everyone. Meanwhile, Danity Kane celebrates their second birthday.
4	The Dating Game	02/18/08	Aubrey and Donnie go on a romantic date, but things sour when she sees him on a second date later that night. Diddy moves the groups to Miami where they move into a house together.
5	Danity Kane Attack	02/25/08	Danity Kane grows unhappy with the tracks they are being given, and they plan to confront Diddy. At home, a new den mother arrives, and the boys quickly plot to get rid of him.
6	A New Dawn	03/03/08	Dawn and Que grow closer, prompting emotions from Dawn's past to surface. Aubrey befriends Donnie, who worries his album is not going to get made.
7	Fight Club	03/10/08	Brian & Robert lash out at each other during the final week of recording and the guys worry that all of this is not meant to be.
8	Beautiful Girls	03/17/08	With Danity Kane's album photo shoot on the horizon, Diddy grows displeased with their current look, and launches a massive makeover. Later, Day26 struggles during a club performance.
9	Hitting the Road	03/23/08	With their new albums just on the horizon, the drama heats up when the acts pile on a tour bus to embark on a promotional tour where Danity Kane whips up a bet with the guys live on the radio.
10	Making the Band 4 Reunion	03/24/08	Day26, Danity Kane, & Donnie all come together to discuss their experiences and perform at the Times Square MTV Studio, plus Diddy announces all 3 acts will embark on a nationwide tour to close the show out.

=== Season 3 ===
The third season premiered on August 19, 2008, and the series finale aired on April 23, 2009. Season 3 would feature the shows stars on a U.S. Tour, the Making the Band Tour. On August 12, 2008, there was a 1-hour special that aired on MTV called "Making the Band's Greatest Hits". The special was hosted by Aubrey from Danity Kane, Donnie Klang and Robert from Day26, looking back on past events throughout the seasons of Making the Band 3 and 4.

Instead of "making a band" the show's focus turned into a The Real World-type show, focusing on friendships, relationships, and drama in and out of the studio and the industry.

==== Episodes ====
No.	Name	Original airdate
1	The Notorious LAG	8/22/08
2	I Want My Money Back	8/29/08
3	Breakdown	9/05/08
4	Showtime NYC	9/12/08
5	Hit the Road	9/19/08
6	Three-way Split	9/26/08
7	Sex and the Diddy	10/03/08
8	Damaged	10/10/08
9	Live Finale	10/17/08
10	London Bridges Falling Down	2/13/09
11	Start Spreading the News	2/20/09
12	How You Gonna Fix It	2/26/09
13	Everyday I'm Hustling	3/05/09
14	Leader of the Pack	3/13/09
15	The Curse	3/19/09
16	Spiral	3/27/09
17	Fight Night	4/02/09
18	Judgement Day	4/09/09
19	Lows on the High Seas	4/16/09
20	The Finale Chapter	4/23/09

== Making His Band ==
Diddy announced that he was searching for musicians for a Making the Band spin-off titled Making His Band, where he would be searching for guitarists, drummers, backup singers, etc. to form his own personal live band. This new season premiered on July 27, 2009.

On September 2, 2009, this series was placed on hiatus. On September 12, 2009, the show returned and aired the last five episodes on a new Saturday time slot. Reasoning for this included a delay in Diddy's album release date as well as generally low ratings overall for the program.

=== Awards ===
In 2010, Making His Band was nominated for a GLAAD Media Award for "Outstanding Reality Program" during the 21st GLAAD Media Awards.
