= Forever in a Day =

Studio album by Day26
- Released: April 14, 2009
- Length: 57:56
- Labels: Bad Boy; Atlantic
- Producers: Diddy (exec.), Tim & Bob, Bryan-Michael Cox, Jermaine Dupri, Dirk Pate, Jazze Pha, Ne-Yo, Tank, T-Pain, Qwanell Mosley, Blaze The Champ, Allstar the Big Beat Maker, Rob Holladay, C-Major

Day26 chronology
Day26 (2008)	Forever in a Day (2009)	A New Day (2014)

Singles from Day26
- 1. "Imma Put It on Her" Released: March 31, 2009; 2. "So Good" Released: August 4, 2009

Forever in a Day is the second studio album by American R&B group Day26, released on April 14, 2009.

== Background and promotion ==
This album was recorded while the band was filming their popular reality show, Making the Band 4, Season 3. During the process of recording the album, Qwanell "Que" Mosley, had frequent arguments and disagreements with the other members of the group, leading the public to think he was "crazy", and even "bipolar". However, the group worked out their issues and recorded their sophomore effort. Que of the group stated in a Twitter message that they had filmed a music video for "Perfectly Blind". Will of the group also stated in a video message that they were on the set of the video for "So Good" on June 2. On June 24, the "Truth Is a Lie video" premiered. On the same day the "Girlfriend" video premiered. Following the album's release, Que went on hiatus from the group in late 2009.

=== Singles ===
The first official single, titled "Imma Put It on Her" was released for digital download on March 31, 2009. The first and only promotional single was "Stadium Music". It was released onto iTunes before the album was released and a music video for the song premiered on the 29 May 2009. The second single, "So Good" was sent to urban radio on August 4, 2009, and its music video was released on August 21, 2009.

== Critical reception ==
Professional ratings
Review scores
Source	Rating
About.com	2.5/5 stars
AllMusic	3/5 stars
DJBooth.net	4/5 stars
Metromix	3.5/5 stars

AllMusic editor Andy Kellman found "even though the members had a hand in co-writing roughly half the material, there's not much to differentiate this set from the first, apart from a slight increase in material best suited for clubs, which plays to the group's strengths. That said, three of the album's highlights are the typically midtempo and dreamily romantic Tim & Bob cuts, and the surprisingly effective Dream/Tricky Stewart knock-off ballad." Mark Edward Nero from About.com found that Forever in a Day was "sort of like a cake; it's topped by some sticky-sweet frosting, in this case radio-friendly pop songs that sit at the top of the album. But the real goodness isn't in the empty, calorie-rich stuff at the top, but in the cake's inner layers. To put it another way, the first handful of tracks on the album are disposable Auto Tune-heavy songs uptempo club that chase trends, while it's some of the latter, mid-tempo tracks that properly showcase the group's singing and rely less on studio gimmicks."

== Chart performance ==
Forever in a Day debuted at number two on the US Billboard 200, selling 113,000 copies in its first-week of release, becoming the group's second top five album on the chart. It slipped to number eight in its second week on the chart, selling further 37,000 copies.

== Track listing ==
Forever in a Day track listing
No.	Title	Writer(s)	Producer(s)	Length
1.	"Just Getting Started"	Brian Angel; Michael McClunney; Qwanell Mosley; Robert CurryJohn Ho; Christian "Davis" Stalnecker; Willie Taylor	Stalnecker; Taylor^{[a]}	3:49
2.	"Imma Put It on Her" (featuring Diddy and Yung Joc)	B. Andrews; Fred "Blaze the Champ" Crawford; Jasiel Robinson; K. Johnson; McCluney; Mosely; Curry; Taylor; Young	Crawford	4:24
3.	"Shawty Wats Up" (featuring T-Pain)	Derryck Thorton; Donald Page; Emmanuel Frayer; Michael Danyell Cole, Jr.; Faheem Najm	Thorton; T-Pain^{[a]}	3:15
4.	"Think of Me"	Bob Robinson; Harve Pierre; Steve Jordan; Tim Kelley	Tim & Bob	3:51
5.	"Stadium Music"	Adonis Shropshire; Brian Andrews; Bryan-Michael Cox; Craig Love; McCluney; Mosley; Curry; Wells; Taylor	Cox	4:05
6.	"Bipolar"	Andrews; C-Major; Devin Johnson; McCluney; Mosley; Taylor	Johnson; C-Major	3:55
7.	"Perfectly Blind"	Andrews; Dawn Richard; Dirk Pate; McCluney; Mosley; Curry; Taylor	Dig of Timeless Music	3:42
8.	"So Good"	Aion David Clarke; Andrews; Cox; Clarence Kage Holmes; McCluney; Mosley; Curry; Taylor	Cox; Holmes	4:18
9.	"Girlfriend"	Durrell Babbs; Antonio Dixon; Lonny Bereal; Jerry "Texx" Franklin; Kristina Stephens; Robert Newt; Thai Jones	Tank	3:44
10.	"Babymaker"	Shropshire; Andrews; Cox; Kendrick Dean; McCluney; Mosley; Curry; Taylor	Cox	4:24
11.	"Then There's You"	Shaffer Smith; David D. Gough	Gough; Ne-Yo^{[a]}	3:36
12.	"Need That" (featuring Jermaine Dupri)	Cox; Dupri; Bryant	Cox; Dupri; Bryant^{[a]}	2:37
13.	"Reminds Me of You"	Robinson; Kelley	Tim & Bob	4:13
14.	"Your Heels"	Jevon Simms; Larry "Detroit" Nix; Phalon Alexander; Ricco Barrino	Jazze Pha; Barrino^{[a]}	3:51
15.	"Truth Is a Lie"	Robert Watson; Allen Potridge; Kenneth Pratt III; Takeya Rideout	Watson; Rideout^{[a]}	4:11

Notes

- ^{^[a]} denotes co-producer

== Forever in Your Eyes ==
Forever in Your Eyes is a video album only released onto iTunes. It contains 8 music videos from Forever in a Day. The track list is:

1. "Just Getting Started"
2. "Imma Put It On Her" (featuring P. Diddy and Yung Joc)
3. "Stadium Music"
4. "Perfectly Blind"
5. "So Good"
6. "Girlfriend"
7. "Then There's You"
8. "Truth Is a Lie"

== Charts ==
=== Weekly charts ===
Weekly chart performance for Forever in a Day
Chart (2009)	Peak position
US Billboard 200	2
US Top R&B/Hip-Hop Albums (Billboard)	1

=== Year-end charts ===
Year-end chart performance for Forever in a Day
Chart (2009)	Position
US Billboard 200	150
US Top R&B/Hip-Hop Albums (Billboard)	38

== Release details ==
Release dates and formats for Forever in a Day
Region	Date	Label	Format
United States	April 14, 2009	Bad Boy Records	CD; digital download
