= Got Me Going =

Single by Day26

from the album Day26
- Released: January 2008
- Genre: R&B, dance-pop
- Length: 4:50 (album version); 3:20 (radio edit)
- Label: Bad Boy; Atlantic
- Songwriters: Sean Combs, Mario Winans, Bryan Michael Cox, Mary Brown, Aion Clarke
- Producers: Diddy, Mario Winans

Day26 singles chronology
| "Got Me Going" (2008) | "Since You've Been Gone" (2008) |

Music video
- "Got Me Going" on YouTube

"Got Me Going" is the debut single from the Making the Band group Day26. It is the first single from their debut album Day26. The song was released digitally in January. Brian Angel, Willie Taylor, Robert Curry, and Big Mike sing lead on the album version. Que has additional ad libs on the single version.

== Music video ==
The music video starts with an appearance by Diddy dressed in black. The camera then switches to the guys walking into a room to find a note left by Diddy on top of 5 black notebooks. They have to write lyrics to a song that they would be recording. As their turns come up each one has a setting with a beautiful model either in a luxurious bedroom or living room. The video also includes choreography with all members dressed in black. As the song comes to an end they finish their lyrics, close their notebooks, smile, get up, and walk out with their notebooks in hand. While walking out to the right of the door there is a calendar set to August. The camera zooms in on the 26th circling it with "Got Me Going" written on that date.

The video, which was directed by Syndrome, premiered on BET's 106 & Park on March 24, 2008, the day before the album's release. The video debuted on 106 & Park on April 3, 2008 at the tenth position and bested at the third position.

== Chart performance ==
The single entered the Billboard Hot R&B/Hip-Hop Songs chart at number 72 and climbed as high as number 30. The single entered the Billboard Hot 100 at number 79 on the week of April 12, 2008 and dropped to 87 the following week and 98 for the last week. "Got Me Going" did not live up to the success of Danity Kanes' first single "Show Stopper" which peaked at number 8 on the Billboard Hot 100.

== Charts ==
| Chart (2008) | Peak position |
|---|---|
| US Billboard Hot 100 | 79 |
| US Digital Song Sales (Billboard) | 59 |
| US Hot R&B/Hip-Hop Songs (Billboard) | 30 |
| US Pop 100 (Billboard) | 75 |

== Remix ==
- Official Remix featuring Fat Joe & Rick Ross
