= Too Hot for TV =

Too Hot for T.V.

Studio album by Bad Boy's Da Band
- Released: September 30, 2003
- Genre: Hip hop
- Length: 60:28
- Labels: Universal; Bad Boy
- Producers: Sean "P. Diddy" Combs; Deric "D Dot" Angelettie; Harve Pierre; Tony Dofat; Phil Robinson; The Natural AKA D-Nat; Stevie J; Poke and Tone; Wyclef Jean; Nisan; Craig Brockman

Singles from Too Hot for TV
- 1. "Bad Boy This, Bad Boy That" Released: 2003; 2. "Tonight" Released: 2003

Too Hot for TV is the only studio album by hip hop group Bad Boy's Da Band. It was released on September 30, 2003 through Universal Records and Bad Boy Entertainment. The album was certified Gold by the RIAA for shipments figures of over 500,000 copies. Two tracks, "Tonight" and "Bad Boy This, Bad Boy That", were released as singles from the album.

== Critical reception ==
Professional ratings
Review scores
Source	Rating
AllMusic	2.5/5 stars
Blender	1/5 stars
HipHopDX	3.5/5
Slant Magazine	2/5 stars

The album earned mixed to negative reviews from music critic. K.B. Tindal from HipHopDX gave the album a 3.5 out of 5 rating. He wote that "after listening to the disc I've come to the conclusion that it really is just another average release by an average band [...] Overall, for a first outing Da Band is not bad and I'm sure under the tutelage of Mister P Diddy himself we will see more greatness to come from these young artists." Alexa Camp, writing for Slant Magazine found that Too Hot For TV "sounds a hell of a lot like your typical hip-hop album. There are a few catchy joints, and the mish-mash of styles works occasionally, but it's just simply not as much fun as watching how far Puff's minions will go for cheesecake, er, fame."

Blender editor Andy Greenwald wrote that "onscreen, Puffy's Making the Band 2 is addictive [but] on record, there's no drama or personality. Every track (aside from the boisterous hit "Bad Boy This, Bad Boy That") is constructed so no one outshines the others — so no one shines at all. Result? Too cold for your stereo. Andy Kellman from AllMusic called Too Hot for TV a "middle-of-the-road and forgettable debut." He concluded: "As a saving grace, at least half of the members prove to have a future well beyond this disc, including Freddrick, whose rasp is probably gruff enough to make The D.O.C. wince." Billboard found that "Da Band really shines its debut set."

== Commercial performance ==
Too Hot for TV debuted at number two on the US Billboard 200 and atop the Top R&B/Hip-Hop Albums chart, with first-week sales of 204,000 copies. The album topped the self-titled debut of the previous Making the Band act, O-Town, by more than 50,000 units.

== Track listing ==
#	Title	Time	Performer(s)
1	"We Here" (Intro)	0:45	Performed by Da Band
2	"My Life"	4:57	Chorus: Sara; First verse: Ness; Second verse: Freddy P; Third verse: Babs
3	"Living Legends"	4:20	Chorus, first verse, & outro: Dylan; Second & sixth verses: Babs; Third verse & eighth verses: Ness; Fourth verse: Freddy P; Fifth & seventh verses: Chopper Young City
4	"Tonight"	4:31	Chorus: Babs, Sara, & Ness; First verse & bridge: Sara; Second verse: Babs; Third verse: Chopper Young City; Fourth verse: Freddy P; Fifth verse: Ness; Sixth verse: Dylan
5	"How U Like Me Now"	4:28	Chorus: Sara; First verse: Ness; Second verse: Chopper Young City; Bridge: Mysterious (Uncredited); Third verse: Freddy P
6	"I Like Your Style"	4:41	Chorus: Babs & Dylan; First verse: Babs; Second verse: Chopper Young City; Bridge: Sara; Third verse: Ness; Fourth verse: Freddy P
7	"What We Gonna Do"	2:57	Chorus: Babs, Sara, & Freddy P; First verse: Ness; Second verse: Chopper Young City; Third verse: Babs; Fourth verse: Freddy P
8	"Why"	4:40	Intro: Dylan; Chorus: Freddy P & Sara; First verse: Chopper Young City; Second verse: Freddy P; Third & fifth verses: Ness; Fourth verse: Babs
9	"Stick Up"	2:57	Performed by: Ness & Freddy P
10	"Whatchu Be Doin'" (Interlude)	0:12	Performed by: Da Band
11	"Chopped Up"	4:31	Performed by: Chopper Young City
12	"Bad Boy This, Bad Boy That"	3:16	Intro: P.Diddy; First verse: Babs; Second verse: Ness; Third verse: Chopper Young City; Fourth verse: Freddy P
13*	"Do You Know" (featuring Wyclef Jean)	3:48	Performed by Da Band (featuring Wyclef Jean)
14	"Hold Me Down"	4:20	First verse: Babs; Second verse: Freddy P; Third verse: Chopper Young City; Fourth verse: Ness; Fifth verse: Dylan
15	"Cheers to Me, Mr. Bentley" (Interlude) (featuring The Madd Rapper& Fonzworth Bentley)	3:02	Performed by: The Madd Rapper & Fonzworth Bentley
16	"They Know"	4:30	Chorus: Chopper Young City; First & third verses: Chopper Young City; Second & fourth verses: Freddy P
17	"Go Steady"	4:50	Chorus, first verse, second verse, & bridge: Sara; Third verse: Ness
18	"Holla" (Outro)	1:03	Performed by: Da Band

== Charts ==
=== Weekly charts ===
Weekly chart performance for Too Hot for TV
Chart (2003)	Peak position
US Billboard 200	2
US Top R&B/Hip-Hop Albums (Billboard)	1

=== Year-end charts ===
Year-end chart performance for Too Hot for TV
Chart (2003)	Position
US Billboard 200	158
US Top R&B/Hip-Hop Albums (Billboard)	53

== Certifications ==
Certifications for Too Hot for TV
Region	Certification	Certified units/sales
United States (RIAA)	Gold	500,000^{^}
^{^} Shipments figures based on certification alone.
