= Day26 (album) =

Studio album by Day26
- Released: March 25, 2008
- Studio: Daddy's House (New York City); Circle House (Miami); The Hit Factory (Miami); Roc the Mic (New York City); Silent Sound (Atlanta); The Boom Boom Room (California)
- Genre: R&B
- Length: 59:44
- Label: Bad Boy; Atlantic
- Producer: Sean Combs; Bryan-Michael Cox; Danja; Kwamé; Malay; Bernard Malik; Marvelous J; Mocheddar; James Poyser; The Runners; Adonis Shropshire; Soul Diggaz; Mario Winans

Day26 chronology
Day26 (2008)	Forever in a Day (2009)

Singles from Day26
- 1. "Got Me Going" Released: February 19, 2008; 2. "Since You've Been Gone" Released: June 9, 2008

Day26 is the debut studio album by American R&B group Day26. It was released by Bad Boy Records and Atlantic Records on March 25, 2008. The album debuted atop the Billboard 200 and Top R&B/Hip-Hop Albums charts and spawned two singles: "Got Me Going" and "Since You've Been Gone".

== Singles ==
The first promotional single is "Exclusive (No Excuses)", which was only released for digital promo-only. The lead single is "Got Me Going", which peaked at number 79 on the Billboard Hot 100. The second single is "Since You've Been Gone".

== Critical reception ==
Professional ratings
Review scores
Source	Rating
AllMusic	3/5 stars
DJBooth	3.5/5 stars
USA Today	2/4 stars

AllMusic's Stephen Thomas Erlewine praised the contributions from Mario Winans ("Got Me Going", "Co-Star"), Danja ("In My Bed") and Malay ("I'm the Reason") and the group's vocal performance throughout the track listing feeling more at ease than "the stiff, labored Danity Kane," despite lacking a distinct "on-record personality," concluding that: "Day26 are indeed a vocal group for their time: they serve the production as much as the production serves them." DJBooth's Nathan Slavik commended the Bad Boy team for allowing the group's performance to be "largely effects-free" and highlighted "Come In" and "Exclusive" as standouts but critiqued that their "still on the teenage side" when it comes to slow jams, concluding with: "[I]s this album truly the second coming of the Age of the Black Male Super Group? Not really, but it's close enough to make me hopeful, and that's going to have to be enough – for now."

== Commercial performance ==
Day26 debuted at number one on the US Billboard 200, with first week sales of about 190,000 copies, making it the third number one album from Making The Band winners. The album also debuted at the top of Top R&B/Hip-Hop Albums and Top Comprehensive Albums charts. As of October 11, 2008, the album has re-entered at number 192 on the Billboard 200 in the US. Day26 landed at number 119 on the year end Billboard 2008.

== Track listing ==
No.	Title	Writer(s)	Producer(s)	Length
1.	"I'm the Reason"	James Ho; Mario Winans; Sean Combs; Tiff Starr; Devin Parker	Malay; Mario Winans^{[a]}; Sean Combs^{[a]}	3:10
2.	"Got Me Going"	Winans; Combs; Aion Clarke; Bryan-Michael Cox; Mary Brown	Winans; Combs	4:42
3.	"In My Bed"	Nathaniel Hills; Shannon Jones; Michael Jones	Danja	3:43
4.	"Silly Love"	Lenton Hutton; Torrey Allen; Mike Winans; Mario Winans; Combs	Marvelous J; Winans^{[a]}; Combs^{[a]}	2:47
5.	"Come with Me"	Kwamé Holland; James Poyser; David Goode; Adonis Shropshire; Mario Winans; Combs	Kwamé; James Poyser^{[b]}; Winans^{[a]}; Combs^{[a]}	3:35
6.	"Co Star"	Mario Winans; Mike Winans; Shay Winans; Combs	Winans; Combs	4:17
7.	"Come In (My Door's Open)"	Jermaine Jackson; Andrew Harr; Brown	The Runners	5:50
8.	"Are We in This Together"	Cox; Clarke	Bryan-Michael Cox; Adonis Shropshire^{[a]}	4:22
9.	"What It Feels Like"	LaShaun Owens; Maurice Wade; Karriem Mack; Nigel Talley; S. Jones; M. Jones; Combs	Mocheddar; Soul Diggaz; Combs^{[a]}	4:10
10.	"Since You've Been Gone"	Cox; Kendrick Dean; Shropshire	Cox; WyldCard^{[a]}; Shropshire^{[a]}	4:11
11.	"If It Wasn't for You"	Ho; Starr; Parker; Winans; Combs	Malay; Winans^{[a]}; Combs^{[a]}	3:30
12.	"Don't Fight the Feeling"	Cox; Clarke	Cox	4:53

Bonus track
No.	Title	Producer(s)	Length
13.	"Just Should've Told You"	Cox	3:50

Hidden tracks
No.	Title	Writer(s)	Producer(s)	Length
14.	"Ain't Going" (featuring Danity Kane and Donnie Klang)	Iyanna Dean; Dawn Richard; Wanita Woodgett; Bernard Malik	Bernard Malik	3:13
15.	"Exclusive (No Excuses)" (Bryan-Michael Cox Uptempo Version)		Cox	3:52

Notes

- ^{^a} denotes co-producer
- ^{^b} denotes additional producer

== Personnel ==
Credits adapted from the album's liner notes.

- Ken Lewis – mixing (2, 4, 5, 9, 11)
- "You Can Ask" Giz – mixing (1, 6, 13)
- Sam Thomas – mixing (8, 10, 12)
- Marcella Araica – mixing (3)
- Fabian Marasciullo – mixing (7)
- Brian Gardner – mastering (Bernie Grundman)
- Mark Obriski – art direction
- Chris Woehrle – package design
- Rob Gold – art manager
- Carolyn Tracey – packaging production
- Mark Mann – photographer

== Charts ==
=== Weekly charts ===
Weekly chart performance for Day26
Chart (2008)	Peak position
US Billboard 200	1
US Top R&B/Hip-Hop Albums (Billboard)	1

=== Year-end charts ===
Year-end chart performance for Forever in a Day
Chart (2008)	Position
US Billboard 200	119
US Top R&B/Hip-Hop Albums (Billboard)	30
