= Day26 =

American male R&B group

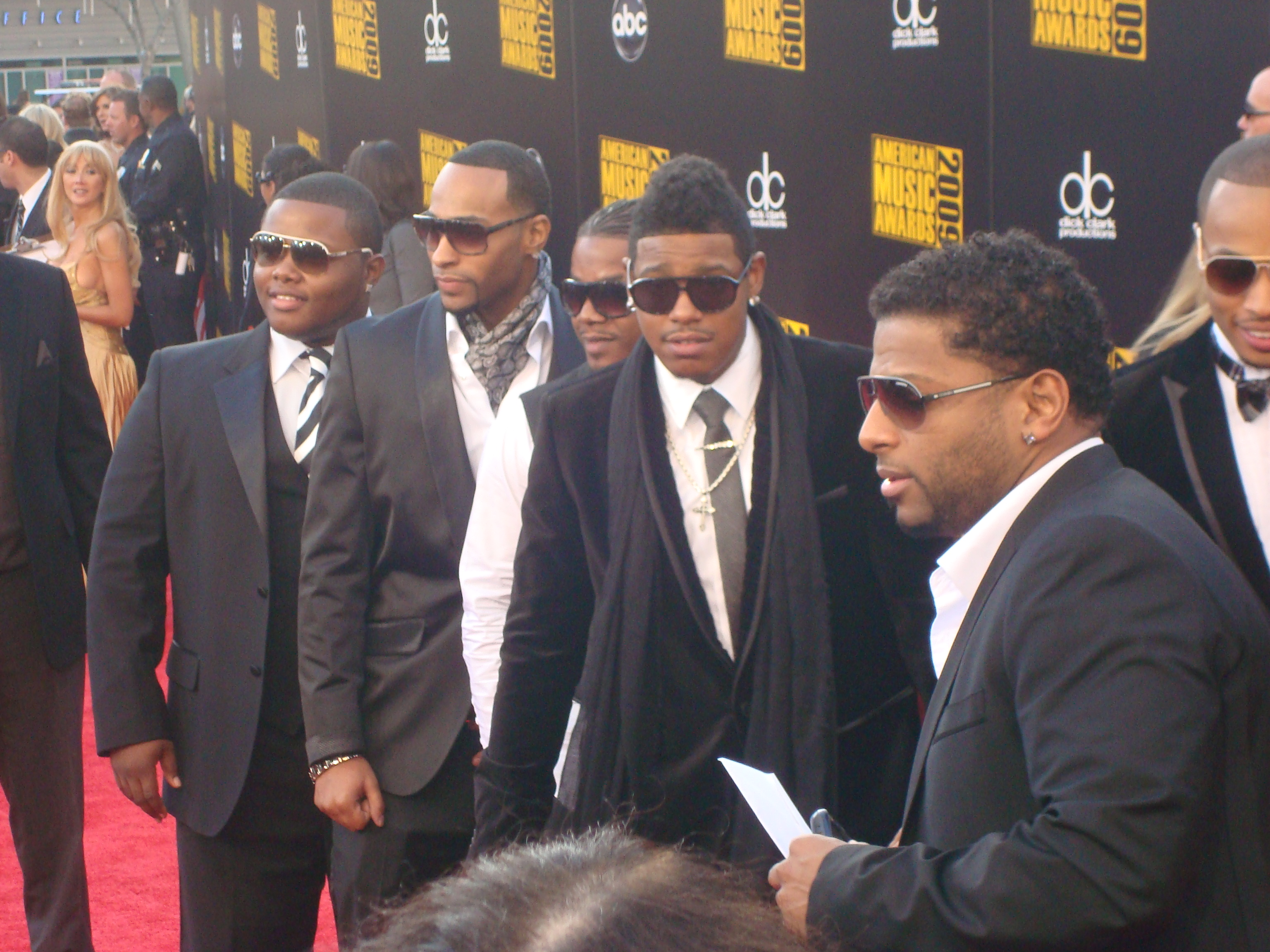
- Day26 at the 2009 American Music Awards

Background information
- Origin: New York City, U.S.
- Genre: R&B
- Years active: 2007–present
- Labels: Bad Boy (2007–12); Atlantic (2007–12); BMG Rights Management (2014–present)
- Members: Robert Curry; Willie Taylor; Michael "Big Mike" McCluney; Qwanell "Que" Mosley; Brian Andrews
- Website: www.day26experience.com

Day26 is an American male R&B music group formed in August 2007 by Sean "Diddy" Combs in a handpicked selection at the end of MTV's Making the Band 4. The group consists of Robert Curry, Brian Angel, Willie Taylor, Qwanell Mosley and Michael McCluney. The moniker is a tribute to the day when Angel, McCluney, Mosely, Curry, and Taylor went from unknowns to stars. The group released their first album, Day26, on March 25, 2008, one week after their then labelmates and Making the Band 3 winners Danity Kane released Welcome to the Dollhouse. The album's first single, "Got Me Going", was released on the finale of Making the Band 4. The album went on to debut at number one on the billboard charts. Subsequent seasons of Making the Band 4 featured the group on tour and making their second album Forever in a Day which also topped the Billboard charts.

== Career ==
Making the Band 4 returned to MTV for another season and followed Day26, Danity Kane and Donnie Klang on the Making the Band 4 - The Tour. Season 3, Part 2 of Making the Band 4 debuted on February 12, 2009. The season followed Day26 as they recorded their second album, Forever in a Day, which was released April 14, 2009.

=== 2007–2008: Formation of group and Day26 ===
Day26 was founded on the Making the Band 4 Season 1 finale on August 26, 2007. Brian Andrews, Michael McCluney, Qwanell Mosley, Robert Curry, and Willie Taylor were chosen to be a part of Diddy's brand new all-male R&B music group, while fellow cast member Donnie Klang was chosen as a solo artist for Bad Boy Records. The name Day 26 was selected from the day that they were picked which was August 26, 2007.

After being signed as a group to Bad Boy, Day 26 began another season of Making the Band with label mates Danity Kane and Donnie Klang. Upon this season, Day 26's debut single "Got Me Going" was released to download in January 2008. "Got Me Going" eventually peaked at #79 on the Billboard Hot 100. Day 26 later released their self-titled album Day26 on March 25, 2008. The next week, the album debuted at #1 on Billboard 200 selling 190,000 copies. This is the third feat. at #1 for Bad Boy winners. Album production includes Mario Winans, Danja, Bryan-Michael Cox, The Runners, and upon many others. The second single "Since You've Been Gone" was released on June 9, 2008. The song failed to reach Billboard Hot 100, but peaked at #52 on Billboard Hot R&B/Hip-Hop Songs. A third single was planned, but was scrapped due to low album sales, and production on their next album. Overall, the album sold 387,000 copies.

On August 19, 2008, Day26 returned with another season of Making the Band. This season involved in Making the Band 4 - The Tour, which resolved to the break-up of Danity Kane.

=== 2009–2011: Forever in a Day and new lineup ===
Making the Band 4 returned to MTV for another season and followed Day26, Danity Kane and Donnie Klang on the Making the Band tour. Season 3, Part 2 of Making the Band 4 debuted on February 12, 2009.

MTV aired part II of the final season of Making the Band 4. The season followed Day26 as they recorded their second album, Forever in a Day, which was released April 14, 2009. It also featured past Danity Kane members Dawn Richard and Aundrea Fimbres trying to move forward with their group. During the season, Que had multiple disagreements with Screwface, the group's new manager, and multiple members of the group.

In December 2009, after differences with their new management team, especially their manager Screwface, Que parted ways with the group. Que has made several videos talking about the split. On his UStream, he read an excerpt of the letter he received announcing him that he was dropped from the group.

Dear Qwanell,

I have been instructed by the members of Day26 copied here to formally advise you that the group members no longer desire to work with you. The members request that no longer you nor any of our representatives contact on behalf or concerning Day26. You may have your attorneys, also copied here, direct any inquiries to my attention.

Brian, Willie, Robert and Michael wish you the best in your future endeavors

Que appeared in the Imma Put It on Her music video and subsequent music videos for the album.

=== 2011–2012: A New Day and break-up ===
In November 2011, the group released the single Made Love Lately. The music video was released in January 2012. They also announced that they were working on a new album to be titled A New Day. On July 16, 2012, news hit the media that Day26 had officially announced their breakup and plans to continue on with their solo careers.

It is with great sadness and deep pain that we regret to inform you that effective immediately, Atlantic Records Platinum recording group, DAY26 have decided to take a break from the group and focus on their own individual projects. On behalf of all the members; Willie, Mike, Rob, Brian and even Que, we would like to thank all of the “fams” aka fans, dj’s across the world, promoters, radio programmers, Bad Boy Entertainment, Starstruck Management, BET, VH1 and FUSE and all DAY26 supporters in general, for your unending support throughout these years.

We would also like to acknowledge that this journey would have not been made possible without the vision and mastermind of Sean “Diddy” Combs and of course MTV Networks for making a group of unknown men, the stars that they are today.

We simply thank you from the bottom of our hearts and really want you to know that the journey does not end here. We continue to wish each other the very best and continued success in all of our individual endeavors, and all we ask of you is to please give each member a chance and the opportunity to shine in whatever they do.

... And as the saying goes, this is not a goodbye, but a simply see you later.

God bless you all,

Much Love, Day26.

=== 2013–18: Reunion and The Return Tour ===
On Thursday, November 21, 2013, fans received word through Twitter from several group members that the group would reunite and be planning a tour for the next year. Several videos have hit the web showing the group recording material for an upcoming new album. The group planned to release the album before the tour kicked off and in doing so, signed with BMG Rights Management. On May 26, 2014, Day26 releases their first single called "Bullshit" off their upcoming EP entitled "The Return", that was set to release on June 26, 2014.

In Spring 2017, all members of Day26 announced over social media they would hold a "10 Year Anniversary Experience" concert that would take place at the Highline Ballroom in New York City on August 26, to commemorate the day they were formed in 2007. Due to the venue being sold out and overwhelming fans demanding more tickets, the band decided add an encore concert for August 27. Joining the concerts' roster of performances is the bands' fellow reality show Making The Band 4/label mate Donnie Klang, who will also celebrate his 10-year solo reunion of the day he was chosen by P. Diddy, which kick-started their careers.

In a 2017 interview with radio personality Sway on his radio show, Sways Universe, Willie announced that the group was recording their third studio album, while also discussing what fame has done for the group in their 10-year run as well as opening up about the controversy with Diddy not allowing the band to appear in the Bad Boy Family Reunion Tour.

On June 29, 2018, Brian Angel leaves Day 26. The singer announced his departure via an Instagram post. "To all the Day26 fans. It saddens me to announce that i am no longer part of Day 26 no there's no problems amongst us, no anger or anything to that nature. this was a decision that i made solely myself. as you guys know we just recently celebrated our 10th year anniversary. they are currently on tour. and yes, I've been absent from the tour dealing with a lot of personal issues. i wish the guys of Day 26 nothing but the best (of course im forever Day 26 its tattooed in my skin) but this a chapter in my life i must close. I am focused on Brian Angel and all my solo endeavors. I look forward to all your future support... God Bless You All"

=== 2022–present: 15th anniversary, Brian's return, The Millennium Tour: Turned Up! and Day Ones ===
On July 19, 2022, all members of Day26 announced the group's fifteenth anniversary on their social medias, which coincided the return of Brian Angel. Following the announcement, Day26 was added to The Millennium Tour: Turned Up! with other artists.

In late 2024, Day26 announced and released their official independently released 3rd album Day Ones and went on a multiple radio and podcast press release in early 2025 promoting the album, while discussing their journey in the music business. Notable interviews on their return was their appearance on The Breakfast Club, VladTV and Tap In with TT, where the group opened up about forming back together after multiple breakups, the discrepancies surrounding managements, opinions on Bad Boy Records and the criminal allegations against P. Diddy as well as personal dealings with him. In a standout moment on VladTV interview in February 2025, Que Mosely expressed how he was able to cope after many traumatic experiences within the music industry, which he later began to receive psychological treatment through therapy after being diagnosed with Schizophrenia and bipolar disorder. He further discussed about his personal interactions with P. Diddy as well opened up about a disturbing undisclosed email sent by P. Diddy, that he later shared with his band members privately, fearing for his life. His public transparency during the interview led to an emotional break, causing each member of the band to cry and walk off camera while filming on-air.

== Pre-Day26 careers ==
Respectively, three of the band members were seasoned artists prior to auditioning for the series Making the Band. Their developing careers would eventually lead them to their path of success.

Robert Curry

Robert was part of a vocal/hip hop teen duo from Detroit in the late 1990s called "Antuan & Ray Ray" which had 3 song collaborations and features on New Edition/BBD member Mike Bivins record label BIV 10 The Adventures of the BIV 10 Pee Wee All Stars Album. Robert performed under the stage name 'Antuan', and his other half of the group 'Ray Ray' is Rashad Morgan who went on to become an R&B artist on Rapper T.I. Grand Hustle Records. Their best known song and video from the album was "Feelin It", which was also part of the animated film "Our Friend, Martin" soundtrack. Another well received track on the album the duo recorded was "The Rain", a remake cover version of the 1974 classic song "Remember the Rain" by the 21st Century. After his contribution with BIV 10, Curry became a songwriter, contributing lyrics for many artist of the industry. He was also part of a vocal group named "Trilogy", who were signed under Wyclef Jean and had to sign out of his contract once he reached a deal with Bad Boy Records after winning Making the Band 4. He also had a songwriting and production deal under Refugee Camp and networked with the likes of Jerry Wonder.

Willie Taylor

Willie was formerly part of an R&B vocal group from his hometown of Chicago called "Kwiet Storm" in the late 1990s. Their band, who was signed under Universal Music Group, released a music video "Leave Me Alone", which circulated on BET music video playlists and shows including 106 & Park. Taylor left the band after a few years later to begin a solo career and become a songwriter for many artists such as Jagged Edge and Ginuwine.The group Kwiet Storm would eventually sign with Island Def Jam a few years after Willie became part of Day 26.

Brian Andrews

Brian was in a group years prior to Day 26 named "Mason Row" and worked closely under Matthew Knowles part of MusicWorld Music/Columbia Records, unfortunately the group disbanded after they were released from their contracts. Which led him to his next career move auditioning for Making the Band 4.

== Post-Day26 solo careers ==
=== Music ===
During the hiatus split of Day26 and after reuniting, each member embarked on their independent solo projects along with other endeavors they pursued:

Band Member	Mixtape / EP	Year released
Qwanell "Que" Mosley	The Q Files	2010
Qwanell "Que" Mosley	Guitar-Her: The Mixtape	2010
Robert "Magnum" Curry	Swagnum: The Mixtape	2010
Willie Taylor	SexTape	2010
Willie Taylor	The Re-introduction of Willie Taylor	2012
Willie Taylor	SexTape 2	2014
Mike "Butta" McCluney	Bonus Track (My Time)	2016
Brian Angel	Daybreak: The Appetizer	2017
Brian Angel	multiple digital music releases	2018–present

Each member released various singles that is not associated with the Mixtapes/EPs, and they also appeared as features on many artists projects.

=== Television/Film & Theater ===
Willie Taylor is most known for displaying his relationship with his wife for the 2nd and 3rd season of the VH1's popular reality show Love & Hip Hop Hollywood, and later sought out relationship counseling through Divorce Court previous presiding judge Lynn Toler on the WE tv reality show Marriage Boot Camp: Reality Stars season (Season 17, Hip-Hop Edition season 3). He also co-starred in the Chocolate City films: Chocolate City: Vegas Strip and Chocolate City: Live Tour. Will joined the off-off Broadway circuit appearing in David E. Talbert's stage play "A Fool and His Money" in 2012 and starred with singer Monifah in the play "Man of the House". He closely worked with Talbert in various of his stage productions up to the present day.

Robert Curry made a guest appearance in an Atlanta urban stage play "Let It Burn" in 2016 and starred in the 2017 stage play "I Cheated, So What!" alongside American Idol winner Fantasia Barrino brother Ricco Barrino. Christopher Williams & Jessica Reedy. He later joined with the New York Black Arts Festival, and appeared with the company on the production of The Wiz, where he played "Tin Man".

Mike McCluney appeared in the film "Conumdrum: Secrets Among Friends" which starred Cameron Bright, Kristina DeBarge & Jo Marie Payton.

== Discography ==
Studio albums

- Day26 (2008)
- Forever in a Day (2009)
- Day Ones (2024)

== Awards and nominations ==
- American Music Awards
  - 2009, Favorite R&B/Hip-Hop Band Duo or Group (Nominated)
- BET Awards
  - 2009, Best Group (Won)
  - 2008, Best Group (Nominated)
- Image Awards
  - 2010, Outstanding Duo or Group (Nominated)
- Teen Choice Awards
  - 2008, Choice Breakout Group (Nominated)
- Online Hip Hop Awards
  - 2008, Digital Download of the Year (R&B) for "Got Me Going" (Won)
- Urban Music Awards
  - 2009, Best Music Video: Imma Put It On Her (Nominated)
  - 2009, Best Male Act (Nominated)

Preceded by Danity Kane	Making the Band winners 2007	Most recent
