= Danity Kane discography =

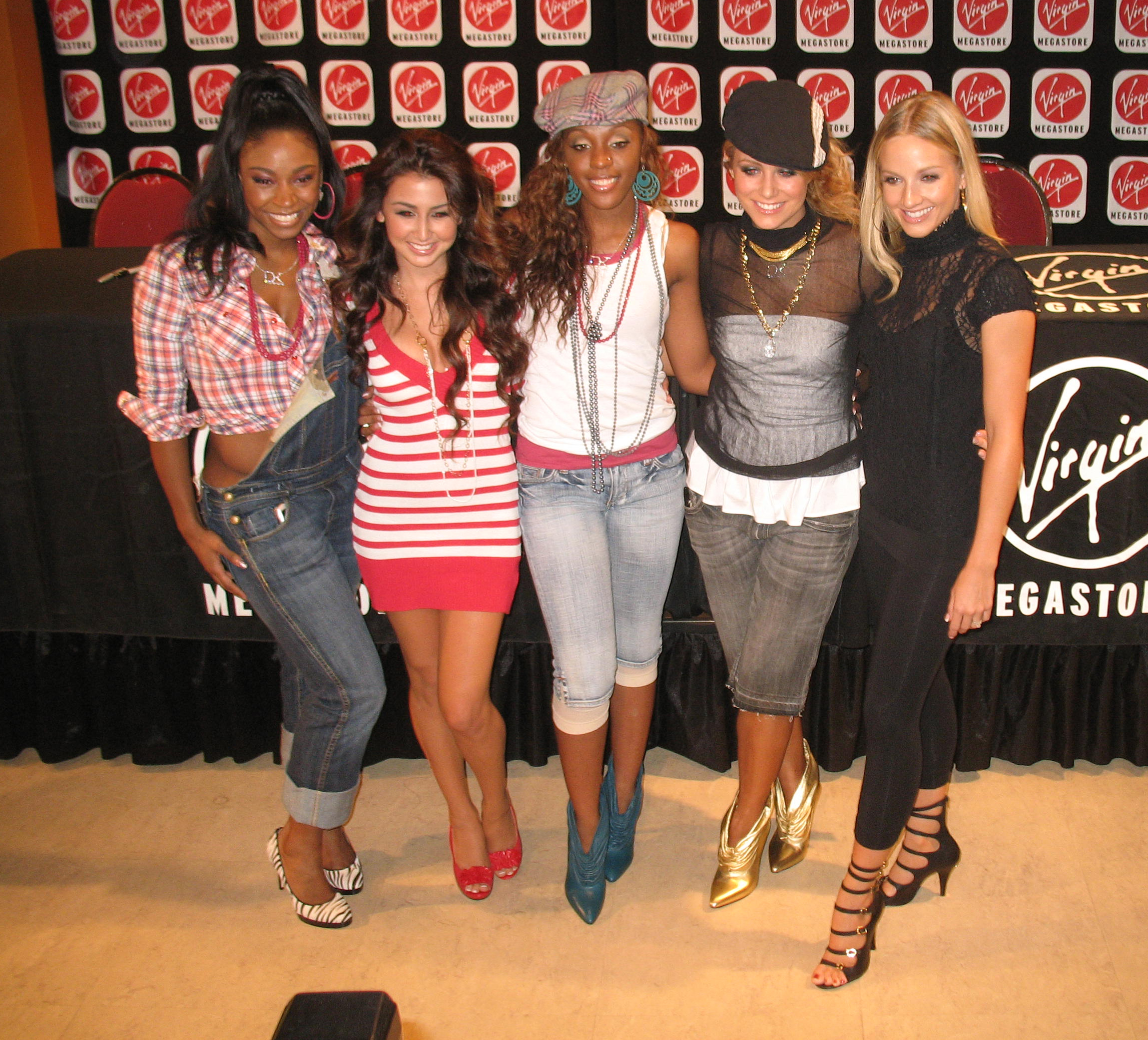
- Studio albums: 3
- Singles: 9
- Music videos: 4
- Other charted songs: 4

The discography of Danity Kane, an American R&B/pop girl group, consists of three studio albums, nine singles, and four music videos. Danity Kane were formed in 2005 during the third season of the reality television series Making the Band, and consisted of Aubrey O'Day, Wanita "D. Woods" Woodgett, Shannon Bex, Dawn Richard, and Aundrea Fimbres. The group disbanded in January 2009 during the fourth season of Making the Band. The group released their self titled debut album in August 2006. The album reached number one on the United States Billboard 200 and was certified platinum by the Recording Industry Association of America (RIAA). Danity Kane's debut single, "Show Stopper", which featured rapper Yung Joc, reached number eight on the US Billboard Hot 100. "Ride for You", their second single, reached number 78 on the Billboard Hot 100. Welcome to the Dollhouse, Danity Kane's second album, was released in March 2008. It reached number one on the Billboard 200 and was certified gold by the RIAA. The album's lead single, "Damaged", reached number ten on the Billboard Hot 100 and was certified platinum by the RIAA. The group's fifth single, "Bad Girl", featured Missy Elliott and reached number 10 on the Bubbling Under Hot 100 chart.

== Studio albums ==
List of studio albums, with selected chart positions and certifications
Title	Album details	Peak chart positions				Certifications
Title	Album details	US	US R&B	GER	SWI	Certifications
Danity Kane	Released: August 22, 2006; Label: Bad Boy; Formats: CD, digital download	1	2	50	83	RIAA: Platinum
Welcome to the Dollhouse	Released: March 18, 2008; Label: Bad Boy; Formats: CD, digital download	1	1	—	—	RIAA: Gold
DK3	Released: October 28, 2014; Label: BMG, Mass Appeal; Formats: CD, digital download	44	7	—	—	
"—" denotes releases that did not chart or were not released in that territory.

== Extended plays ==
List of extended plays
Title	EP details
Strawberry Milk	Released: March 5, 2020; Label: Our Dawn Entertainment / Double Platinum; Format: Digital download

== Singles ==
List of singles, with selected chart positions and certifications
Title	Year	Peak chart positions					Certifications	Album
Title	Year	US	AUS	AUT	CAN	GER	Certifications	Album
"Show Stopper" (featuring Yung Joc)	2006	8	—	60	—	27	RIAA: Gold	Danity Kane
"Ride for You"	2006	78	—	—	—	—		Danity Kane
"Home for Christmas"	2006	—	—	—	—	—		Non-album single
"Damaged"	2008	10	51	—	26	—	RIAA: Platinum	Welcome to the Dollhouse
"Bad Girl" (featuring Missy Elliott)	2008	— (Note: "Bad Girl" did not enter the Billboard Hot 100, but peaked at number 10 on the Bubbling Under Hot 100 chart.)	—	—	—	—		Welcome to the Dollhouse
"Lemonade" (featuring Tyga)	2014	—	—	—	—	—		DK3
"Rhythm of Love"	2014	—	—	—	—	—		DK3
"Neon Lights"	2019	—	—	—	—	—		Non-album singles
"New Kings"	2020	—	—	—	—	—		Non-album singles
"—" denotes releases that did not chart or were not released in that territory.

== Other charted songs ==
List of other charted songs, with selected chart positions
Title	Year	Peak	Album
Title	Year	US	Album
"One Shot"	2006	— (Note: "One Shot" did not enter the Billboard Hot 100, but peaked at number 11 on the Bubbling Under Hot 100 chart.)	Danity Kane
"Touching My Body"	2006	— (Note: "Touching My Body" did not enter the Billboard Hot 100, but peaked at number nine on the Bubbling Under Hot 100 chart.)	Danity Kane
"Sleep On It"	2006	64	Danity Kane
"Lights Out"	2008	— (Note: "Lights Out" did not enter the Billboard Hot 100, but peaked at number one on the Bubbling Under Hot 100 chart.)	Welcome to the Dollhouse

== Music videos ==
List of music videos
Title	Year	Director(s)	Ref.
"Show Stopper"	2006	Jessy Terrero	
"Ride for You"	2006	Marcus Raboy	
"Damaged"	2008	Syndrome	
"Bad Girl"	2008	Erik White	
