= Welcome to the Dollhouse (album) =

Studio album by Danity Kane
- Released: March 18, 2008
- Recorded: April 2007 – January 2008
- Genres: Pop; R&B
- Length: 48:42
- Labels: Bad Boy; Atlantic
- Producers: Diddy (also exec.); The Clutch; Bryan-Michael Cox; Danja; Nard & B; Rockwilder; Chris N Teeb; Flex&Hated; The Runners; Harve "Joe Hooker" Pierre; Fridolin Nordsoe; Stereotypes; Mario Winans; Syience; WyldCard

Danity Kane chronology
Danity Kane (2006)	Welcome to the Dollhouse (2008)	DK3 (2014)

Singles from Welcome to the Dollhouse
- 1. "Damaged" Released: January 29, 2008; 2. "Bad Girl" Released: July 1, 2008

Welcome to the Dollhouse is the second studio album by American girl group Danity Kane. It was released by Bad Boy Records and Atlantic Records on March 18, 2008 in the US and March 25, 2008 in Canada. Danity Kane recorded much of the album in under five weeks, while filming the second season of Making the Band 4 with fellow label mates Day26 and Donnie Klang first in New York City, New York, then in Miami, Florida. As with their self-titled debut album, Bad Boy consulted a wide range of producers to work with the band on the album, including The Stereotypes, The Runners and Flex & Hated as well as previous collaborators such as Bryan Michael Cox, Danja, and inhouse producer Mario Winans.

The album earned a largely mixed reception by music critics, many of whom were divided on the question whether Welcome to the Dollhouse was superior to 2006's Danity Kane. It became the band's second consecutive album to debut atop the US Billboard 200, with first weeks sales of 236,000 copies. Spawning the US top ten single "Damaged," the album was eventually certified Gold by Recording Industry Association of America (RIAA). The group intended to open for Janet Jackson's Rock Witchu Tour for promotion, but label conflicts forced them to withdraw. Welcome to the Dollhouse was Danity Kane's last album released before the group broke up in early 2009, and it was also their final album to be released as a quintet.

== Background ==
While serving as the opening act of Christina Aguilera's Back to Basics Tour, the group announced that they were beginning work on their second album. For Welcome to the Dollhouse, all of the girls had written and/or produced some kind of song, that they thought was suitable for their second effort. As mentioned in interviews, Danity Kane has stated that they came up with the name of the album when they all had brought in their own material into the studio to see which tracks would make the cut. They also expressed, that it felt as if they were in a music box, hence getting the name, Welcome to the Dollhouse. Each of the girls, also, were given chances to co-write a handful of the tracks that are on the record.

== Singles ==
The album's lead single, "Damaged," was chosen through an online fan poll. In January 2008, Danity Kane had posted a bulletin on their respective MySpace page, expressing that they were giving their fans the chance to choose their newest single. Fans were given two choices, "Damaged" and "Pretty Boy". Of the two choices, "Damaged" dominated the poll by a vast majority, and thus, became the lead single from Welcome to the Dollhouse. The song debuted on the US Billboard Hot 100 at number 64, and eventually peaked at number 10, becoming their second and final top ten in the United States. Elsewhere, it reached top thirty of the Canadian Hot 100, peaking at number 26, and the top twenty of Billboard's Global Dance Songs, becoming Danity Kane's highest-charting international single.

Erik White directed and Gil Duldulao choreographed the music video for "Bad Girl." The video featured cameos from Missy Elliott, Qwanell Mosley from their fellow Bad Boy Records band Day26, and Talan Torriero of the MTV show Laguna Beach. The concept of the video is a graphic novel and stays true to the line in the song "When the red light comes on, I transform" as each member transforms into an alter ego of theirs after a flash of red light. "Bad Girl" marked Danity Kane's last single as a group before their early 2009 breakup. It peaked at number 85 on the US Billboard Pop 100.

== Critical reception ==
Professional ratings
Aggregate scores
Source	Rating
Metacritic	59/100
Review scores
Source	Rating
AllMusic	2/5 stars
Artistdirect	3.5/5 stars
Entertainment Weekly	C
Slant Magazine	3/5 stars
USA Today	2/4 stars

Welcome to the Dollhouse received mostly mixed reviews from critics. At Metacritic, which assigns a normalized rating out of 100 to reviews from mainstream critics, the album has an average score of 59 based on 8 reviews. The Village Voice editor Clover Hope wrote that "these gals are older, more cohesive, and more enchanting than before". She found that while the "made-for-Idol ballads "Poetry" and "Is Anybody Listening" impress, Danity's better at cock-teasing over mid-tempo-to-jumpy rhythms. Curiously strong, theirs is more Altoids than bubble-gum pop." Sal Cinquemani from Slant Magazine called the album "a solid collection of appropriately vacant party jams, slinky come-ons, and modern, urban balladry." In another positive review, Vibe remarked that "while DK's quest for pop domination falls short, the club-friendly Dollhouse cements their posh appeal." Billboard's Mariel Concepcion remarked that "unlikely the quintet's self-titled debut, which took a slightly more hip-hop soul approach, Welcome to the Dollhouse features more mid- and uptempo pop tracks."

Prefix found that the tracks on Welcome to the Dollhouse "are pretty effective R&B/pop numbers with a strong roster of producers, such as Danja and the Dream [...] Danity Kane has what it needs in serving up radio-ready R&B: good singers with a hot look and some of the best beats around." Entertainment Weekly journalist Simon Vozick-Levinson felt that with Welcome to the Dollhouse "the group continues to show us precious little in the way of actual personality or soul. On one song after another, they sing about sex with all the feeling of fresh-from-the-factory mannequins." AllMusic editor Stephen Thomas Erlewine called the album "a paler, plainer recycling of their debut. All five of the DK girls are blandly, conventionally pretty in their voices (not to mention their looks), and no amount of melisma can lend them personality [...] Maybe hearing the end results would be interesting if you've witnessed the labors on Making the Band, but anybody else will wonder why it takes so much work to sound so bland... and why we are bothering thinking about them anyway." The Boston Globe wrote that "unlike their modestly appealing and tuneful debut, this disc [...] is generic and vapid, seemingly geared more for the strip mall than the strip club."

== Commercial performance ==
Welcome to the Dollhouse debuted on top of the US Billboard 200, with first week sales of 236,000 copies, making it the band's second consecutive number-one album. This made Danity Kane the first female group in Billboard history to have both their debut and second albums enter the main charts at the top of the chart. Less than a month after its release, Welcome to the Dollhouse was certified gold by the Recording Industry Association of America (RIAA). By October 2008, the album had sold over 546,000 copies in the US, according to Nielsen SoundScan. Billboard ranked Welcome to the Dollhouse at number 75 on its Billboard 200 year-end listing.

== Track listing ==
Standard edition
No.	Title	Writer(s)	Producer(s)	Length
1.	"Welcome to the Dollhouse" (featuring P. Diddy)	Harve Pierre; Sean Combs	Antwan "Amadeus" Thompson; Joe Hooker	0:46
2.	"Bad Girl" (featuring Missy Elliott)	Mary Brown; James Washington; Devin Parker; Nathanial Hill; Melissa Elliott	Danja; Brown^{[A]}	4:01
3.	"Damaged"	Jonathan Yip; Jeremy Reeves; Micayle McKinney; Ray Romulus; Shannon Lawrence; Rose Marie Tan; James Smith; Justin Walker; Combs; Mario Winans	Stereotypes; Combs^{[B]}; Winans^{[B]}	4:06
4.	"Pretty Boy"	Balewa Muhammad; Candace Nelson; Ezekiel Lewis; Patrick Smith; Hill	Danja	3:59
5.	"Strip Tease"	Wanita Woodgett; Dawn Richard; Aundrea Fimbres; Shannon Bex; Aubrey O'Day; Hill; Washington	Danja	3:15
6.	"Sucka for Love"	Bryan-Michael Cox; Kendrick Dean; Muhammad; Lewis; Smith; Nelson	Cox; Wyldcard^{[B]}; The Clutch^{[B]}	2:55
7.	"Secret Place" (Interlude)	Winans; Richard; W. Woodgett; Fimbres; Bex; O'Day	Winans	1:16
8.	"Ecstasy" (featuring Rick Ross)	Andrew Harr; Jermaine Jackson; Brown; William Roberts	The Runners; Brown^{[A]}; Pierre^{[C]}	4:36
9.	"2 of You"	Cox; Darnley Scantlebury; Adonis Shropshire; Dean; Aian David Clarke; Wynter Gordon	Cox; State of Emergency; Wyldcard^{[B]}; Adonis ^{[C]}; Voyce Alexander^{[C]}	3:53
10.	"Lights Out"	Richard; Neil Betz; Craig Betz; Winans; Combs	Flex & Hated; Akeem Lee; Combs^{[B]}; Winans^{[B]}	3:25
11.	"Picture This" (Interlude)	O'Day; W. Woodgett; Winans	Winans	1:14
12.	"Poetry"	Remington-Christopher Dambach; James Hoe; Tiffany Star Kumar; Winans; Combs	Bernard Malik Doss	4:42
13.	"Key to My Heart"	Shanell Woodgett; Reggie Perry	Syience	2:29
14.	"Flashback" (Interlude)	Romeo IX; W. Woodgett; Richard	Romeo IX	1:13
15.	"Is Anybody Listening..."	Niara Scarlet; Fridolin Nordsoe; Winans; Combs	Nordsoe; Winans; Hooker	3:27
16.	"Ain't Going" (featuring Day26 and Donnie Klang)	Iyanna Dean; Richard; W. Woodgett; Rackley; Rosser; Malik	Doss	3:12
Total length:				48:40

Target edition bonus track
No.	Title	Writer(s)	Producer(s)	Length
17.	"Make Me Sick"	Anesha Birchett; Antea Joy Birchett; Chris Grayson; Kateeb Muhammad	Chris N Teeb; Rockwilder	3:40

US iTunes edition bonus tracks
No.	Title	Writer(s)	Producer(s)	Length
16.	"Show Stopper" (Dave Audé Club remix)	Angela Hunte; Kristal Oliver; Calvin Puckett; Frank Romano; James Scheffer	Jim Jonsin; Dave Audé^{[D]}	7:26
17.	"Show Stopper" (Solitaire Club remix)	Hunte; Oliver; Puckett; Romano; Scheffer	Jonsin; Albert Castillo^{[D]}; Lewis Dene^{[D]}; Solitaire^{[D]}	7:29
18.	"Damaged" (Acapella)	Yip; Reeves; McKinney; Romulos; Lawrence; Tan; J. Smith; Walker; Combs; Winans	Stereotypes; Combs^{[B]}; Winans^{[B]}	4:06
19.	"Ain't Going" (featuring Day26 and Donnie Klang)	I. Dean; Richard; Woodgett; Rackley; Rosser; Malik	Doss	3:12
20.	"Damaged" (Music video)

Notes

- ^{^[A]} denotes vocal producer
- ^{^[B]} denotes co-producer
- ^{^[C]} denotes additional vocal producer
- ^{^[D]} denotes additional producer

== Personnel ==
Credits adapted from the liner notes of Welcome to the Dollhouse

Technical and production

- Victor Abijaudi – engineer
- Voyce Alexander – vocal producer
- Marcella Araica – mixing engineer
- Shannon Bex – vocalist
- Mary Brown – backing vocals on "Bad Girl", vocal producer
- Jim Beanz – vocal Producer
- The Clutch – producer ("Sucka for Love")
- Bryan-Michael Cox – arranger, bass guitar, drums, keyboards, programming, strings ("Sucka for Love" and "2 of You"), producer ("Sucka For Love" and "2 of You")
- Sean Combs – producer ("Damaged", "Lights Out" and "Is Anybody Listening")
- Danja – producer ("Bad Girl", "Pretty Boy" and "Strip Tease")
- Steve Dickey – engineer, mixing assistant
- Paul J. Falcone – engineer
- Aundrea Fimbres – vocalist
- Flex & Hated – producer ("Lights Out")
- Fridolin – producer ("Is Anybody Listening")
- Brian Gardner – mastering
- Andy Geel – engineer
- Giz – mixing engineer
- Koil – engineer
- Shannon Lawrence – vocal producer
- Akeem Lee – producer ("Lights Out")
- Ken Lewis – mixing engineer
- Bernard Malik – mixing engineer, producer ("Ain't Going")
- Fabian Marasciullo – mixing engineer
- Daniel Mitchell – assistant engineer
- Aubrey O'Day – vocalist
- Harve Pierre – vocal producer, producer ("Welcome to the Dollhouse")
- Dawn Richard – vocalist
- Rockwilder – producer ("Make Me Sick")
- Romeo IX – producer ("Flashback Interlude")
- The Runners – producer ("Ecstasy")
- Donnie Scantz – bass guitar, drum programming, keyboards ("2 of You")
- Scyience – producer ("Key to My Heart")
- Adonis Shropshire – vocal producer
- Tiff Starr – vocal producer
- Jahi Sundance – bass guitar, drum programming, keyboards ("2 of You")
- Stereotypes – producer ("Damaged")
- Matthew Testa – mixing engineer
- Sam Thomas – mixing engineer
- Antwan Thompson – producer ("Welcome to the Dollhouse")
- Jeff Villanueva – engineer
- Kevin Wilson – engineer
- Mario Winans – arranger ("Secret Place", "Picture This" and "Is Anybody Listening"), producer ("Damaged", "Secret Place (Interlude)", "Lights Out", "Picture This (Interlude)", "Poetry" and "Is Anybody Listening")7
- D. Woods – vocalist
- Wyldcard – keyboard, strings, producer ("Sucka for Love" and "2 of You")

Managerial and imagery

- Sean Combs – executive producer
- Conrad Dimanche – associate executive producer, A&R
- Rodger Erickson – photographer
- Julius Erving – management
- Hughes Felizor – A&R coordinator
- Rod Gold – art manager
- Shannon Lawrence – A&R
- Kenneth Meiselas – legal representation
- Daniel Mitchell – A&R coordinator
- Gwendolyn Niles – A&R administration
- Mark Obriski – art direction and design
- Harve Pierre – co-executive producer
- Ed Shapiro – legal representation
- Kamala Salmon – marketing
- Marni Senofonte – styling
- Francesca Spero – Bad Boy Films/Making the Band 4 executive
- Carolyn Tracey – packaging production
- Sharon Tucker – A&R administration
- Eric Wong – marketing

== Charts ==
=== Weekly charts ===
Weekly performance for Welcome to the Dollhouse
Chart (2008)	Peak position
US Billboard 200	1
US Top R&B/Hip-Hop Albums (Billboard)	1

=== Year-end charts ===
Year-end performance for Welcome to the Dollhouse
Chart (2008)	Position
US Billboard 200	75
US Top R&B/Hip-Hop Albums (Billboard)	24

== Certifications ==
Certifications for Welcome to the Dollhouse
Region	Certification	Certified units/sales
United States (RIAA)	Gold	500,000^{^}
^{^} Shipments figures based on certification alone.

== Release history ==
Welcome to the Dollhouse release history
Region	Date	Format	Label	Ref(s)
United States	March 18, 2008	CD; digital download	Bad Boy; Atlantic	
France	March 18, 2008	CD; digital download	Bad Boy; Atlantic	
United Kingdom	April 21, 2008	CD; digital download	Bad Boy; Atlantic	
Canada	March 25, 2008	CD; digital download	Bad Boy; Atlantic	
Germany	May 9, 2008	CD; digital download	Bad Boy; Atlantic	
Australia	September 13, 2008	CD; digital download	Bad Boy; Atlantic	
