= Dumblonde (album) =

dumblonde

Studio album by Dumblonde
- Released: September 25, 2015
- Recorded: 2014–2015
- Genres: Pop, electropop, alternative dance
- Length: 39:24
- Label: Double Platinum
- Producers: R8DIO, Dem Jointz

Dumblonde chronology
dumblonde (2015)	Bianca (2019)

Singles from dumblonde
- 1. "White Lightning" Released: August 14, 2015; 2. "Tender Green Life" Released: August 14, 2015; 3. "Remember Me" Released: August 14, 2015; 4. "Eyes On Horizon" Released: August 14, 2015; 5. "Dreamsicle" Released: August 14, 2015

dumblonde is the debut studio album by American duo Dumblonde, consisting of Aubrey O'Day and Shannon Bex. It was released on September 25, 2015, by Double Platinum, Inc, and is their first musical project since the split of their original girl group Danity Kane in 2014.

== Music videos ==
List of music videos, showing director
Title	Year	Director
"White Lightning"	2015	Justin Jones & Aubrey O'Day
"Dreamsicle"	2015	Alfredo Flores & Aubrey O'Day
"Tender Green Life"	2015	Aubrey O'Day
"Carry On"	2015	Justin Jones & Aubrey O'Day

== Commercial performance ==
The album was a modest success. It debuted at number 129 on the Billboard 200 chart, with first-week sales of 5,031 copies in the United States.

== Critical reception ==
Professional ratings
Review scores
Source	Rating
Spin	7/10
VH1	(favorable)

== Track listing ==
No.	Title	Writer(s)	Producer(s)	Length
1.	"White Lightning"	Shannon Bex, Aubrey O'Day, Candice Pillay	Dem Jointz, R8DIO	4:03
2.	"Eyes On Horizon"	O'Day, Bex, Pillay		3:21
3.	"Love Blind"	Bex, O'Day, Pillay		4:00
4.	"Tender Green Life"	O'Day, Pillay, Bex		3:07
5.	"Remember Me"	O'Day, Pillay, Bex		4:01
6.	"You Got Me"	Bex, O'Day, Pillay		3:38
7.	"Waiting On You"	Bex, O'Day, Pillay		2:50
8.	"Yellow Canary"	Bex, O'Day, Pillay	Dem Jointz	3:33
9.	"Dreamsicle"	Julian Lowe, Travis Garland, Troy "R8DIO" Johnson, Hayley Steele		3:51
10.	"Take Away"	Bex, O'Day, Pillay		4:13
11.	"Carry On"	Bex, O'Day, Pillay		2:47
Total length:				39:24

== Charts ==
Chart (2014)	Peak position
US Billboard 200	129
US Top Album Sales	59
US Digital Albums	26
US Heatseekers Albums	1
US Top Dance/Electronic Albums	3
US Independent Albums	14

== Release history ==
Region	Date	Label	Format
United States	September 25, 2015	Double Platinum	Digital download
