= DK3 =

Studio album by Danity Kane
- Released: October 27, 2014
- Recorded: May 2013 – August 2014
- Genres: Pop; R&B
- Length: 37:19
- Labels: Stereotypes Music; BMG; Mass Appeal
- Producers: The Stereotypes; Dem Jointz

Danity Kane chronology
Welcome to the Dollhouse (2008)	DK3 (2014)	Strawberry Milk (2020)

Singles from DK3
- 1. "Lemonade" Released: May 28, 2014; 2. "Rhythm of Love" Released: September 24, 2014

DK3 is the third and final studio album by American girl-group Danity Kane. It was released on October 27, 2014, by Stereotypes Music and Mass Appeal, in association with BMG Rights Management. It was the group's first album in six years following their first disbandment, as well as their first album without original group members D. Woods, who left the group in 2008, and Aundrea Fimbres, who left five months prior to the album's release, leading to the removal of her vocals on much of the material for DK3. Danity Kane reunited with production team the Stereotypes to work on the majority of the album, with producer Dem Jointz contributing the song "All in a Day's Work".

Upon its release, DK3 was very well received by critics, who praised the album's diversity and commercial appeal, as well as Danity Kane's vocals. Their first independent release following their departure from Bad Boy Records, DK3 debuted and peaked at number 44 on the US Billboard 200 and became their third studio album to reach the top ten on the Top R&B/Hip-Hop Albums chart. The album was preceded by two singles: "Lemonade" and "Rhythm of Love", it was their final album before going on an indefinite hiatus.

== Background ==
Following Aubrey O'Day and D. Woods departures from the group in 2008, the remaining members, Shannon Bex, Aundrea Fimbres, and Dawn Richard, split up. In 2013, Bex, Fimbres, O'Day, and Richard reunited with plans to release a new album. The group later initiated the No Filter Tour in the US to promote their comeback and new music. Following a few promotional performances, Fimbres announced in May 2014 that she would be permantely leaving the group due to being engaged by husband and her desire to start a family, despite already having had recorded vocals for the album. Bex, O'Day, and Richard revealed that they would stay a trio and continue to perform together. However, tensions between O'Day and Richard lead to a fight in early August 2014, and the group split a few days later. On September 24, 2014, O'Day and Bex announced that the album would still be released as a thank you to their fans.

== Critical reception ==
Professional ratings
Review scores
Source	Rating
Fact	positive
FDRMX	4.6/5 stars
Los Angeles Times	positive
PressPlay	3/5 stars
SoSoGay	4.8/5 stars
AllMusic	3/5 stars

Upon release, DK3 generally well received by critics. Gerrick Kennedy of The Los Angeles Times stated the album "captures Danity Kane's essence" despite murky origins, "DK3 is effervescent and completely primed for dance floors – even if the ladies have long left the party." Nicole Tucker of FDRMX notice the album "overall sound is very diverse and commercial. Though it doesn’t exactly FIT the R’n’B genre it’s listed under, the urban lyrics and brilliant engineering make a definitive sound for the collective. DK3 is a great album that’s simply an inevitable result of one of this year’s biggest music comebacks."

PressPlay lauded the production, drawn praising to tracks "Lemonade" and "All in a Day's Work": "The glorious “here’s to the haters” rip-up of "Lemonade," Danity Kane sound more alive as a trio than ever before. The harmonies sound effortless – you can practically picture the shoulder brush when they sing about making it look easy on "All in a Day's Work" – and there's zero reflection of discord in the music. Danity Kane clearly still have a lot to offer us so, girls, a message: sort your shit out before we call Oprah to intervene. Ya heard." Elliot Robinson of SoSoGay praised the songs' harmonies and hooks, writing: "DK3 serves as a decisive reminder of Danity Kane's short-lived brilliance, full of tight harmonies and killer hooks."

== Commercial performance ==
DK3 debuted and peaked at number 44 on the US Billboard 200. This marked Danity Kane's lowest opening up to then and was a considerable decline from their previous efforts Danity Kane (2006) and Welcome to the Dollhouse (2008), both of which had opened at number one on the chart. DK3 became their band's consecutive album to reach the US Top R&B/Hip-Hop Albums, peaking at number seven, It also was their first entry on the US Independent Albums chart, reaching number six.

== Track listing ==
DK3 track listing
No.	Title	Writer(s)	Producer(s)	Length
1.	"Rhythm of Love"	Jonathan Yip; Jeremy Reeves; Ray Romulus; Ray McCullough; Candice Nelson; Patrick "J. Que" Smith	The Stereotypes; Nelson^{[A]}; Smith^{[A]}	3:36
2.	"Lemonade" (featuring Tyga)	Yip; Reeves; Romulus; McCullough; Mike Lloyd; Rosina "Soaky" Russell; Michael Ray Nguyen-Stevenson	The Stereotypes; Travis Garland^{[B]}	4:24
3.	"All in a Day's Work"	Dwayne Abernathy; Taylor Parks; Paris Jones	Dem Jointz; Taylor Parks^{[A]}	3:14
4.	"Rage"	Yip; Reeves; Romulus; McCullough; Kessington Kross	The Stereotypes; Danity Kane^{[A]}	3:26
5.	"Tell Me"	Dawn Angelique Richard; Yip; Reeves; Romulus; McCullough; Russell	The Stereotypes; Soaky^{[A]}	3:39
6.	"Two Sides"	Yip; Reeves; Romulus; McCullough; Malcolm "Three" McDaniel	The Stereotypes; Danity Kane^{[A]}	3:43
7.	"Secret Lover"	Yip; Reeves; Romulus; McCullough; Kross	The Stereotypes; Kross^{[A]}	3:59
8.	"Roulette"	Yip; Reeves; Romulus; McCullough; Clarence Coffee, Jr.	The Stereotypes; Coffee^{[A]}	3:53
9.	"Pieces"	Yip; Reeves; Romulus; McCullough; McDaniel	The Stereotypes; Danity Kane^{[A]}	3:09
10.	"Bye Baby"	Yip; Reeves; Romulus; McCullough; Parks; Kameron Glasper	The Stereotypes; Parks^{[A]}; Kam Parker^{[A]}	4:16

Notes

- ^{^[A]} denotes vocal producer
- ^{^[B]} denotes additional vocal producer

== Charts ==
Chart (2014)	Peak position
US Billboard 200	44
US Independent Albums (Billboard)	6
US Top R&B/Hip-Hop Albums (Billboard)	7

== Release history ==
DK3 release history
Region	Date	Format	Label	Ref(s)
Various	October 27, 2014	CD; digital download	Stereotypes Music; Mass Appeal; BMG Rights	
