= Vooks =

American educational streaming platform

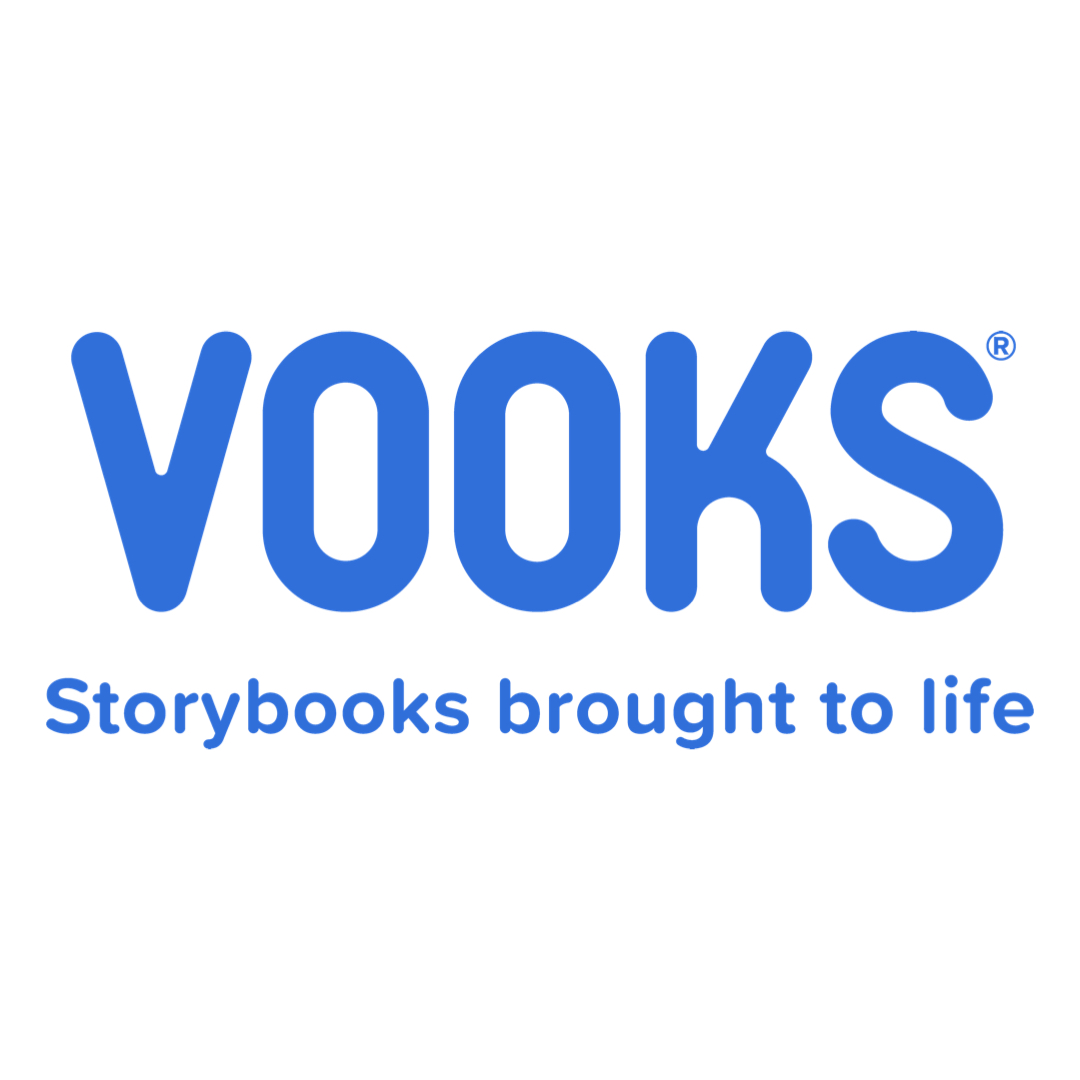
- Type: Private company
- Industry: Educational technology / Streaming media
- Founder: Shannon Bex, Russell Hirtzel, and Marshall Bex
- Headquarters: Portland, Oregon, United States
- Area served: Worldwide
- Products: Streaming platform for animated children's storybooks
- Services: Subscription video on demand (SVOD)
- Website: https://www.vooks.com

Vooks is an American educational streaming platform that produces and distributes animated storybooks for children. The service combines illustrated picture books with animation, voice narration, read-along text highlighting, and accompanying music and sound effects. Vooks is based in Portland, Oregon, and operates on a subscription model.

The platform’s content is intended to support early literacy by integrating visual and auditory storytelling elements.

== History ==
Vooks was founded in 2018 by Marshall Bex, Russell Hirtzel, and Shannon Bex. They established the company with the goal of adapting picture books into animated, narrated digital formats.

Since its launch, Vooks has expanded its catalog to include Spanish Hindi titles. The company has formed partnerships with Amazon Prime Video, Discovery Education, Kanopy, and several international airlines.

During the COVID-19 pandemic, Vooks was cited by publications such as Barron for its role in providing digital reading resources amid increased demand for online educational tools.

== Awards and recognition ==
Vooks has received recognition from Academics' Choice, an organization that evaluates educational media and products. The platform has also been covered by media outlets including GeekDad, Cool Mom Tech, and Smarter Learning Guide for its development of animated digital storybook adaptations.

Vooks has received the following awards and industry recognitions:

- Parent’s Picks Awards
- Global Tech Awards
- EdTech Breakthrough Award
- Family Choice Award
- National Parenting Product Awards
