= Ride for You =

Single by Danity Kane

from the album Danity Kane
- Released: December 11, 2006
- Recorded: 2006
- Studio: The Hit Factory (New York City)
- Length: 4:11
- Label: Bad Boy; Atlantic
- Songwriters: Bryan Michael Cox; Kendrick Dean; Adonis Shropshire
- Producer: Bryan Michael Cox

Danity Kane singles chronology
"Show Stopper" (2006)	"Ride for You" (2006)	"Damaged" (2008)

Music video
- "Ride for You" on YouTube

"Ride for You" is a song by American girl group Danity Kane, written by Bryan Michael Cox, Kendrick "Wyldcard" Dean, and Adonis Shropshire for the group's 2006 self-titled debut album, and produced by Cox, with Wyldcard and Shropshire serving as additional producers. Recorded during the production of the third season of the MTV television series Making the Band, the downtempo song was released as the album's second and final single in winter 2006 and peaked at number 78 on the US Billboard Hot 100.

== Background ==
"Ride for You" was written and produced by Bryan Michael Cox along with frequent partners Kendrick "Wyldcard" Dean, and Adonis Shropshire. The recording of the song was tracked while filming the third season of Making the Band. When asked about the process, band member Shannon Bex explained, "We went to the studio and he sat us down and played the track he got the vibe for us and figured out what our style was and he came back with an amazing song. It's just about being in love being in that relationship and being in those wearing times and just not giving up on each other, riding for each other."

== Chart performance ==
"Ride for You" debuted and peaked at number 78 on the US Billboard Hot 100 in the week of September 9, 2006 – the same week that parent album Danity Kane was released. After being released as a single, it peaked at #37 on the Rhythmic chart in January 2007.

== Music video ==
A music video for "Ride for You" was directed by Marcus Raboy, and filmed in various locations throughout Los Angeles, California on November 3, 2006. The edited video debuted on MTV's countdown show Total Request Live on December 5, 2006.

Thematically, the video deals with the four seasons. It begins with Aundrea Fimbres leaving her home in a summer vignette. After singing her verse, Fimbres enters fall and joins Aubrey O'Day for a walk through the chorus. During Dawn Richard's verse, Fimbres and O'Day leave fall behind and join Richard under an umbrella on a late fall/early winter city street. The three of them then enter winter where they find Bex and D. Woods. The five of them sing the chorus and enter spring right as D. Wood's verse starts. At the end of the video, when D. Woods does her final note, the five women of Danity Kane meet up with their men and the video ends with beauty shots of each of the girls.

== Track listing ==
All tracks written by Bryan Michael Cox, Kendrick Dean, and Adonis Shropshire.

Promo CD single
No.	Title	Length
1.	"Ride for You" (radio edit)	3:58
2.	"Ride for You" (album version)	4:11
3.	"Ride for You" (instrumental)	4:11

== Credits and personnel ==
- Shannon Bex – vocals
- Bryan Michael Cox – instruments, producer, writer
- Kendrick Dean – co-producer, writer
- Aundrea Fimbres – vocals
- Kev-O – assistant engineer
- Aubrey O'Day – vocals
- Dawn Richard – vocals
- Adonis Shropshire – vocal producer, writer
- Sam Thomas – engineer
- D. Woods – vocals

== Charts ==
Chart performance for "Ride for You"
Chart (2006)	Peak position
US Billboard Hot 100	78
US Rhythmic Airplay (Billboard)	37
