= Danity Kane (album) =

Studio album by Danity Kane
- Released: August 22, 2006
- Recorded: February–May 2006
- Studios: The Hit Factory (Miami, Florida)
- Genres: R&B; pop
- Length: 49:28
- Labels: Bad Boy; Atlantic
- Producers: Arnthor Birgisson; Timbaland; Bryan Michael Cox; Mario Winans; Danja; D-Dot; Rodney Jerkins; Jim Jonsin; Ryan Leslie; Scott Storch; WyldCard; Rami Yacoub

Danity Kane chronology
Danity Kane (2006)	Welcome to the Dollhouse (2008)

Singles from Danity Kane
- 1. "Show Stopper" Released: August 22, 2006; 2. "Ride for You" Released: December 11, 2006

Danity Kane is the debut album by the American girl group Danity Kane. It was released by Bad Boy Records and Atlantic Records on August 22, 2006, in the United States.

After Danity Kane won the third installment of the reality talent contest Making the Band in late 2005, Sean "Diddy" Combs and Bad Boy vice president Harve Pierre consulted a wide range of high-profile hip-hop and R&B musicians to work with the quintet, including Timbaland, Danja, Bryan Michael Cox, Rami, Ryan Leslie, Rodney "Darkchild" Jerkins, Scott Storch, and Jim Jonsin, as well as Bad Boy inhouse producers Mario Winans and D-Dot. Recorded mainly within five weeks, the making of the album was tracked by the second half of Making the Band 3's third season.

Upon its release, the album earned mixed reviews from music critics, many of whom considered the album confident but found the material uneven or generic. A commercial success, Danity Kane sold over 109,000 copies in its first day of release, placing it at number 1 on the US Billboard 200. Having surpassed sales in excess of 935,000 copies by 2008, it was eventually certified Platinum by Recording Industry Association of America (RIAA) for over one million copies shipped domestically. In support of the album, Danity Kane released two singles, including the top ten hit "Show Stopper," and served as the singer Christina Aguilera's opening act during the North American leg of her Back to Basics Tour (2007).

== Background ==
Much of Danity Kane was recorded between February and May 2006 at The Hit Factory in Miami, Florida. "I Wish," a previously unreleased song that the band had worked on with Shannon Jones and Jack Knight during the production of the album, was released digitally in February 2021. In May 2023, band member Aubrey O'Day disclosed that several songs that they had recorded were left unused and instead re-recorded with other artists for Combs' fourth studio album Press Play (2006), including "Come to Me" featuring Nicole Scherzinger, "Tell Me" featuring Christina Aguilera and "After Love" featuring Keri Hilson.

== Singles ==
Jim Jonsin-produced "Show Stopper" featuring rapper Yung Joc was released as the album's lead single. It debuted at number 17 US Billboard Hot 100 in the week of September 2, 2006 and eventually peaked at number eight the following week. In Germany, the song debuted and peaked at number 27 on the German Singles Chart in November 2006, becoming the band's only top 40 hit there. "Show Stopper" was followed by the moderately successful single "Ride for You" which peaked at number 78 on the US Billboard Hot 100 only.

== Critical reception ==
Professional ratings
Review scores
Source	Rating
About.com	3/5 stars
AllMusic	3/5 stars
Rolling Stone	3/5 stars
USA Today	2.5/4 stars

Danity Kane earned generally mixed reviews from music critics. Deepti Hajela from CBS News wrote that "Diddy's taking no chances [...] And it pretty much pays off. While there are a few clunkers, and some clear filler, there are also some standouts." AllMusic rated the album three stars out of five and found that the band members "easily display enough sensuality and confidence to position themselves for competition in the pop diva big leagues." Rolling Stone critic Rob Sheffield praised Danity Kane for its polished production and confident attitude, highlighting "Show Stopper" as a stylish R&B anthem. He noted the group's potential as the latest reality-show-formed pop act to achieve mainstream success.

John Bergstrom, writing for PopMatters, argued that "instead of being eclectic or even disparate, Danity Kane is full of the clattering, mid-tempo, bass-heavy, spaced-out grooves that currently dominate mainstream hip-hop and "R&B." It sounds good as far as this type of thing goes. Every so often, the production is even interesting [...] But most of the rest runs from undistinguished to intolerable." Steve Jones of USA Today gave the album a two-and-a-half-star rating, noting that the group followed a familiar pop formula of polished production, harmonies, and catchy hooks. He praised their vocal ability and radio potential, highlighting "Show Stopper" as a standout. Bill Lamb of About.com found Danity Kane to be a strong commercial concept but criticized the album for lacking memorable hooks. He praised the group's vocal and performance abilities, as well as the high-profile production team, while arguing that the songwriting failed to match their potential.

== Commercial performance ==
Danity Kane debuted and peaked at number 1 on the US Billboard 200, selling 234,000 copies in its first week. This marked the highest chart opening as well as the biggest first week sales for any Making the Band season winner. On Billboard's component charts, the album debuted and peaked number two on both the Top R&B/Hip-Hop Albums chart and the Tastemaker Albums chart – only behind Outkast's Idlewild (2006). On October 24, 2006, it was certified gold by the Recording Industry Association of America (RIAA), followed by a platinum certification a month later for the shipment of over 1,000,000 copies in the United States. In total, Danity Kane had sold 935,000 copies domestically by 2008. Elsewhere, Danity Kane entered the charts in Germany and Switzerland, peaking as number 50 on the German Albums Chart and number 95 on the Swiss Albums Chart.

== Track listing ==
Danity Kane track listing
No.	Title	Writer(s)	Producer(s)	Length
1.	"One Shot"	Bryan Michael Cox; Kendrick Dean; Adonis Shropshire	Cox	3:41
2.	"Heartbreaker"	Angela Hunte; Kristal Oliver; Calvin Puckett; Frank Romano; James Scheffer	Jim Jonsin	3:03
3.	"Want It"	Nathaniel Hills; Keri Hilson; Timothy Mosley; James Washington	Timbaland; Danja	3:22
4.	"Right Now"	Hills; Hilson; Mosley; Washington	Timbaland; Danja	3:32
5.	"Show Stopper" (featuring Yung Joc)	Hunte; Oliver; Puckett; Romano; Scheffer	Jonsin	3:49
6.	"Hold Me Down"	Rodney Jerkins; Delisha Thomas; LaShawn Daniels; Keli Nicole Price; Antea Birchett	Jerkins	3:57
7.	"Come Over" (Interlude)	Mike Winans; Mario Winans	Mario Winans	1:44
8.	"Ooh Ahh"	Ryan Leslie	Leslie	2:51
9.	"Press Pause"	Deric Angelettie; Michael Carlos Jones; Mike Winans; Mario Winans	D-Dot; Mario Winans	3:12
10.	"Ain't True" (Interlude)	Mike Winans; Mario Winans	Mario Winans	1:34
11.	"Ride for You"	Cox; Dean; Shropshire	Cox; WyldCard^{[A]}	4:11
12.	"Touching My Body"	Leslie; Makeba Riddick; Shropshire	Leslie	3:42
13.	"Back Up"	Cox; Dean; Cheri Dennis	Cox	3:59
14.	"Stay with Me"	Rami Yacoub; Arnthor Birgisson; Riddick	Rami; Arnthor	3:54

Bonus track
No.	Title	Writer(s)	Producer(s)	Length
15.	"Sleep On It"	Scott Storch; Jason Boyd	Storch	3:23
Total length:				49:28

Notes

^{^[A]} denotes co-producer

== Personnel and credits ==
Musicians

- Shannon Bex – lead vocalist
- Aundrea Fimbres – lead vocalist
- Aubrey O'Day – lead vocalist
- Dawn Richard – lead vocalist
- Yung Joc – guest vocalist
- Shay Winans – background vocalist
- D. Woods – lead vocalist

Technical and production

- Marcella Araica – engineer
- Chris Athens – mastering engineer
- Chapman Baehler – photography
- Jim Beanz – vocal producer
- Arnthor Birgisson – producer
- Cornell "Nell" Brown – recording engineer
- Noel Burdick – recording engineer
- Demacio Castellon – mixing engineer
- Candice Childress – production coordinator
- Sean Combs – executive producer
- Harve Pierre – executive producer
- Bryan-Michael Cox – producer, vocal producer
- D–Dot – producer
- Danja – producer
- Conrad Dimanche – vocal producer
- Mike "Daddy" Evans – production coordinator
- Jan Fairchild – engineering assistant
- Andy Geel – vocal producer
- Joe Gonzales – engineering assistant
- Andrew Haller – recording engineer
- Rodney Jerkins – mixing engineer, producer
- Jim Jonsin – producer
- Rich Keller – mixing engineer
- Ryan Kennedy – engineering assistant
- Kev–O – engineering assistant
- Kevin Krouse – mixing engineer
- Ryan Leslie – producer
- Rob Marks – engineer
- Gwendolyn Niles – A&R
- Mark Obriski – art direction, design
- Bill Pettaway – production coordinator
- Makeba Riddick – vocal producer
- Adonis Shropshire – vocal producer
- Sean Tallman – recording engineer
- Timbaland – producer
- Sam Thomas – engineer
- Scott Storch – producer
- Supa And Tight Writer – vocal producer
- Rami Yacoub – producer
- Jeff Villanueva – engineer
- Kevin Wilson – engineering assistant
- Mario Winans – producer
- WyldCard – co–producer, vocal producer

== Charts ==
=== Weekly charts ===
Weekly performance for Danity Kane
Chart (2006)	Peak position
German Albums (Offizielle Top 100)	50
Swiss Albums (Schweizer Hitparade)	83
US Billboard 200	1
US Top R&B/Hip-Hop Albums (Billboard)	2

=== Year-end charts ===
Year-end performance for Danity Kane
Chart (2006)	Position
US Billboard 200 (Billboard)	76
US Top R&B/Hip-Hop Albums (Billboard)	41

== Certifications ==
Certifications for Danity Kane
Region	Certification	Certified units/sales
United States (RIAA)	Platinum	1,000,000^{^}
^{^} Shipments figures based on certification alone.

== Release history ==
Danity Kane release history
Region	Date	Format	Label	Ref(s)
United States	August 22, 2006	CD; digital download	Bad Boy; Atlantic	
United Kingdom	August 29, 2006	CD; digital download	Bad Boy; Atlantic	
Germany	November 10, 2006	CD; digital download	Bad Boy; Atlantic	
Switzerland	November 10, 2006	CD; digital download	Bad Boy; Atlantic	
Philippines	January 5, 2007	CD; digital download	Bad Boy; Atlantic	
