= Dumblonde =

American singing duo (formed 2015)

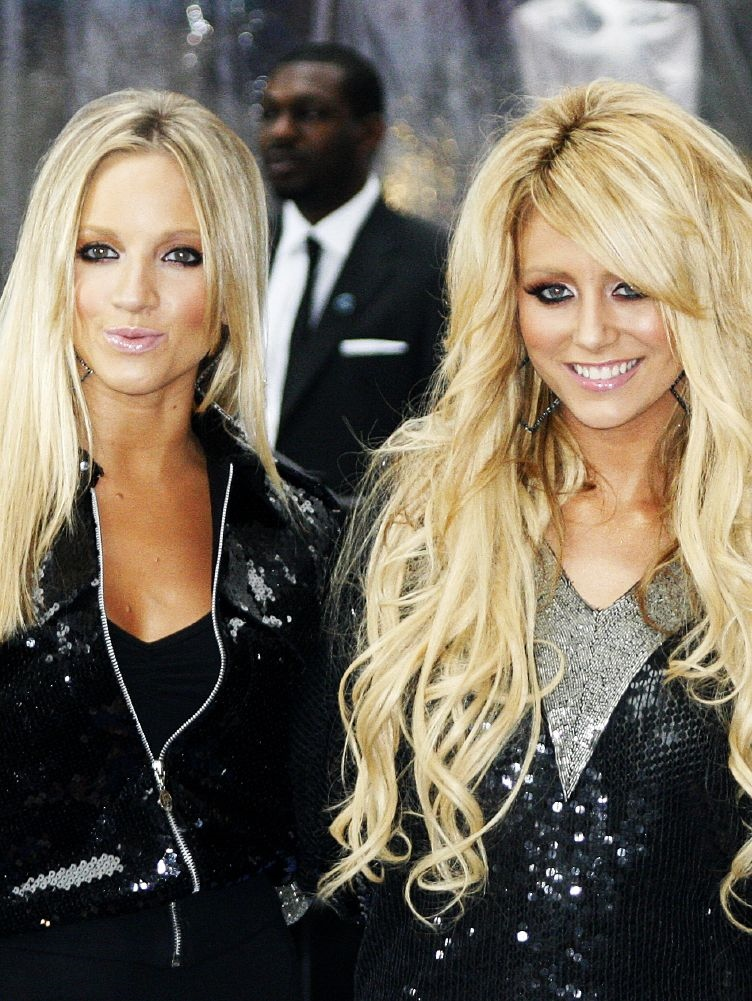
- Dumblonde as Danity Kane members in October 2006. (L–R) Shannon Bex and Aubrey O'Day.

Background information
- Origin: Los Angeles, California, U.S.
- Genres: Alternative dance; dance-pop; electropop; synth-pop
- Years active: 2015–2019
- Labels: Double Platinum Inc.; Caroline Records
- Spinoff of: Danity Kane
- Past members: Shannon Bex; Aubrey O'Day
- Website: www.dumblondeofficial.com

Dumblonde (stylized dumblonde) was an American alternative dance pop duo consisting of Danity Kane members Shannon Bex and Aubrey O'Day.

== History ==
=== 2014–2016: Danity Kane split, formation of Dumblonde and debut album ===
On August 4, 2014, while in a Los Angeles recording studio, a fight ensued in which fellow Danity Kane member Dawn Richard allegedly punched O'Day. After days of speculation, O'Day and Bex released a public statement on August 8 announcing the group's second disbandment.

On September 24, 2014, O'Day and Bex announced that despite the group's break-up, their third album, DK3, would be released on October 28, 2014.

After the split of Danity Kane, Aubrey O'Day and Shannon Bex decided to make alternative dance pop music as a duo. On March 29, 2015, O'Day and Bex announced the name of their group: Dumblonde. The group's self-entitled album was released on September 25, 2015. Peaking at #1 on the Billboard U.S. Heatseekers Chart. To promote the album, they performed at small venues and gay pride festivals across the United States.

=== 2017–2019: White Hot Lies and reuniting with Danity Kane ===
In 2018, Bex and O'Day announced the lead single from their untitled second album entitled White Hot Lies to be released July 4, 2018. After releasing White Hot Lies in the summer of 2018 the ladies announced that they would be touring with Danity Kane again to promote the new album's from both dumblonde and Dawn Richard. The tour would include music from Dawn's solo work, Dumblonde's album as well as music from Danity Kane the tour began September 28, 2018 in Stamford, Connecticut and ended on March 2, 2019, in Seattle Washington. The second dumblonde album bianca was released on March 4, 2019.

== Discography ==
=== Albums ===
List of extended plays, with selected chart positions
Title	Album details	Peak chart positions						Sales
Title	Album details	US	US Dance	US Heat	US Indie	US Digital	US Sales	Sales
dumblonde	Released: September 25, 2015; Label: Double Platinum, Inc.; Formats: Digital download	129	3	1	14	59	26	US: 10,000
Bianca	Released: March 4, 2019; Label: Double Platinum Inc.; Formats: Digital download	—	— (Note: "Bianca" did not enter the Top Electronic Albums, but peaked at number 1 on the Dance/Electronic Album Sales chart.)	—	—	—	—	

== Singles ==
List of official singles
Title	Single details
White Hot Lies	Released: July 4, 2018; Label: Double Platinum Inc.; Formats: Digital Download

== Music videos ==
List of music videos, showing director
Title	Year	Director
"White Lightning"	2015	Justin Jones & Aubrey O’Day
"Dreamsicle"	2015	Alfredo Flores & Aubrey O’Day
"Tender Green Life"	2015	Aubrey O’Day
"Carry On"	2015	Aubrey O’Day
"Remember Me"	2016	Shannon Bex & Aubrey O'Day
''White Hot Lies''	2019	Aubrey O'Day
"Waiting on you"	2019	Shannon Bex & Aubrey O'Day
