= Flex & Hated =

Flex&Hated (C. Betz & N. Betz)
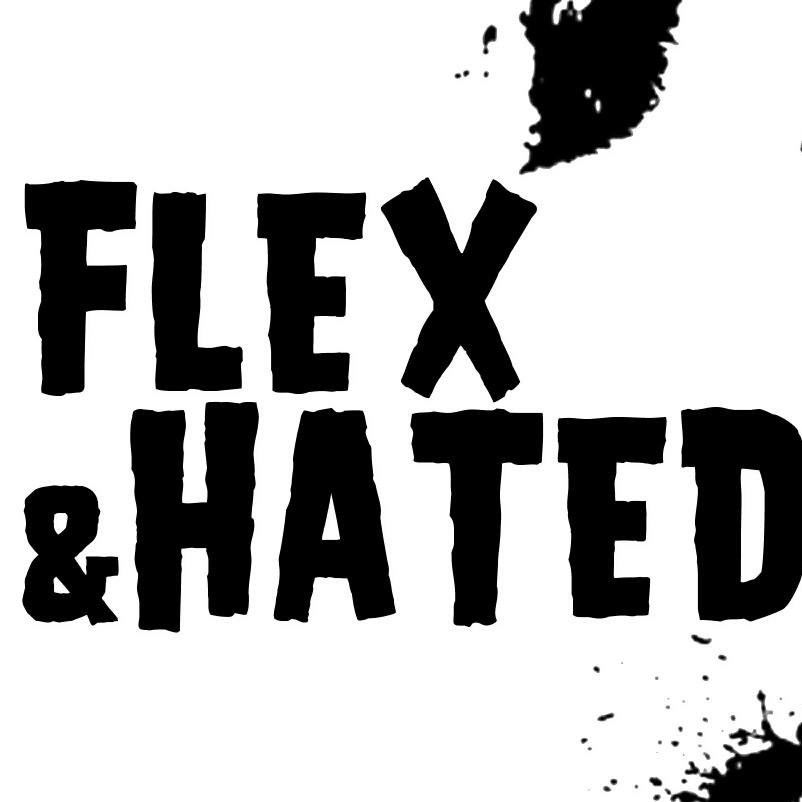

Background information
- Birth name: Neil Betz and Craig Betz
- Origin: Wilmington, Delaware
- Genres: Pop; R&B; Hip hop Alternative hip hop Hip pop
- Occupation(s): Music Impresario, Executive Producer, Record Producer, Musical arranger, Composer, Production Studio owner, Musician
- Instrument(s): Piano, Guitar, Digital Workstations, Reasons Propellerhead
- Years active: 1992 – present

Flex & Hated is an American pop music production team consisting of members Flex and Hated, both born in Wilmington, Delaware. The duo, who are also brothers, started as a rap group known as Cipha in the mid-90s; they released several local records, which caught the attention of Vibe magazine, "40 Acres and Mule" Records, Def Jam, and Violator management. When a chance meeting with a member of the group Prophet Jones led to Flex&Hated's first placement (referred to as 456 Music at the time) on the 2001 Motown-released album Prophet Jones, the duo's focus changed from rapping–writing to music production.

Flex&Hated were fortunate enough to learn under producers, such as DJ Clark Kent, who managed the group early on, to Grammy Award-winning producer Rockwilder, whom the group met in 2003. Before placing records, Flex&Hated paid dues, by being in the studio and working with or submitting tracks for many artists, including 50 Cent, Lil' Kim, Onyx, Black Rob, Carl Thomas, and many more.

The production team's biggest break came in 2007; after meeting Dawn Richard of Danity Kane, the duo began to compile a catalog of songs with Dawn over their pop club style tracks, the result, "Lights Out" a track off the No. 1 Billboard debuting album Welcome to the Dollhouse, by Danity Kane. "Lights Out" was the third highest downloaded song from the Welcome to the Dollhouse LP and charted as No. 1 on Billboard's hot bubbling under 100 singles chart on April 5, 2008. "Lights Out" also reached No. 26 on Billboard's Hot Digital chart and No. 78 on Billboard's Pop 100 chart in 2008.

During the fourth quarter of 2008, Flex & Hated submitted a song/demo for Jamie Foxx's Intuition LP titled "Turn This T.V. Off" which featured rapper Twista. The song was written and referenced by songwriter–artist D. Goode. The demo version of the song was leaked on the internet and was featured on several large music websites. "Turn This T.V. Off" gained much popularity with media and underground DJ's sites so much so that it appeared as track No. 9 on the unofficial advanced street version of Jamie Foxx's Intuition album.

On May 9, 2009. the song "Train Wreck", written by Dawn Richard and produced by Flex&Hated and Eric Price, was leaked on the internet and has been featured on many online music and gossip websites. The production duo continue to work and submit songs for major label acts.

== Discography and credits ==
=== Credits ===
Year	Album/Song	Artist	Credit
2010	Last Train to Paris (Unreleased ) /"Before"	P.Diddy/Dirty Money	Producer
2009	GoldenHeart (single)/"Trainwreck"	Dawn Richard	Producer
2008	Intuition (Demo)/ "Turn This T.V. Off"	Jamie Foxx feat. Twista	Producer
2008	Welcome to the Dollhouse /"Lights Out"	Danity Kane	Writer, Producer
2001	Prophet Jones/"Prophet Jones (Track 06)"	Prophet Jones	Producer (listed as Sharp for 456Music)

== Awards and nominations ==
Year	Album/Artist/Song	Award/Nomination
2008	Welcome To The Dollhouse/Danity Kane/"Lights Out"	Gold Certification Award from RIAA
