= Aundrea Fimbres =

American singer (born 1983)

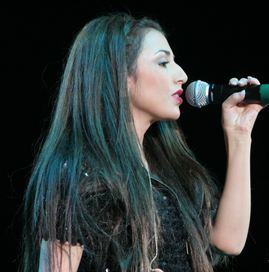
- Fimbres performing in 2006

Background information
- Born: Aundrea Aurora Fimbres; June 29, 1983 (age 43); Upland, California, U.S.
- Genres: R&B, pop
- Occupation: Singer
- Years active: 2004–2014, 2025-present
- Label: Bad Boy (2005–2009)
- Member of: Danity Kane

Aundrea Aurora Fimbres (born June 29, 1983) is an American singer. She was a former member of the pop music group Danity Kane. She is a soprano and was known for her melismatic vocal runs, and falsetto registered harmonies and also for having the highest vocal range of her fellow band members.

On December 9, 2025, Fimbres reunited with Danity Kane and returned to the industry for the first time since 2014.

== Early life ==
Fimbres was born in Upland, California, to Mexican-American parents. The youngest child in her family, Fimbres first attended Claremont High School then transferred to Upland High School.

Fimbres was singing from an early age. During her high school years she was a member of a pop ensemble, Intrigue.

Before Fimbres auditioned for Making the Band 3 she was three semesters short of completing a degree in education, with the intention of becoming a kindergarten teacher — a back-up plan to singing that she had promised her parents she would have.

== Career ==
=== 2004–2005: Making the Band ===
In 2004, Fimbres auditioned in Los Angeles for the first season of Making the Band 3 – the same audition as fellow band member Aubrey O'Day. They met at the audition, which subsequently led to their friendship. At the final audition, not only was Fimbres successful but she was the first contestant to make it into the house.

Fimbres was one of the "standouts" during the competition. She excelled in dancing and her vocals set her apart from the other contestants. She experienced significant personal struggles while competing, which helped to further endear her to the audience. Their "den mother" Jason was viewed as rude to the women in the house. In one episode, Jason criticized Fimbres for not having a well-toned abdomen. Despite this, Fimbres continued to display good vocal and dance performances.

During the first-season finale of Making the Band 3, Sean Combs decided against forming a group, but chose Fimbres as one of the contestants from the first season, along with O'Day, to participate in the second season. During the second season, Fimbres' dance performance declined. Her vocals remained favorable to judges and fellow contestants, but her dancing ability was in question. Fimbres later improved the quality of her dancing. On the season finale of the series, she was picked to be in the group, which soon became known as Danity Kane.

=== 2005–2009: Danity Kane and group disbandment ===
Danity Kane's first studio album, Danity Kane was released in 2006 and achieved success in the United States, shipping a million copies domestically,. Two singles from the album were top 10 hits, "Show Stopper", and the ballad, "Ride for You". Their second studio album, Welcome to the Dollhouse, was released on March 18, 2008, following the release of their second top 10 hit single "Damaged". The band became the first female group in Billboard history to have their first two albums open at the top of the charts.

The season finale of Making the Band October 14, 2008, confirmed the departure of O'Day and D. Woods. With bandmate Shannon Bex deciding not to continue within the group and declining to return to film the show's 2009 season, Fimbres and Dawn Richard were the only two returning members for the group and the series. The group's break up was confirmed in January 2009. However, they were shown on air as being completely over in April 2009, where Fimbres was "officially" released from her Bad Boy Records contract by Combs in the April 16, 2009, episode of the series.

Fimbres had initially formed a strong connection with O'Day while competing to be in the band. The two made it through two seasons together, and gained a large and loyal fanbase before Combs chose them to be in the group. Viewers named the two "the AUs" and "Aubrea" (portmanteau of their first names put together), and O'Day declared Fimbres her best friend in the season 2 finale of the series. Fimbres' friendship with O'Day, however, later became distant, which has been suggested as one of the reasons for Danity Kane's demise.

=== 2010–2012: Solo activities and Soto band ===
In June 2010, an original Fimbres song was leaked on the Internet titled "Brush You Off". Later, this song was revealed to be a demo that Fimbres had made in 2006. In August 2010, with former Danity Kane bandmate, Aubrey O'Day, she revealed via Ustream that both had recorded a track titled "Ego Trip" to be included on Aubrey O'Day's solo album, but was later taken off the album before it was released. They also answered some fan questions about the band's split.

In 2010, Fimbres began performing and touring with Soto, a Latin/funk/R&B band from Norwalk, California.

In 2012, Fimbres was named executive producer of J-Live Entertainment's Next Big Thing Talent Show.

=== 2013–2014: Danity Kane reunion and retirement from entertainment industry ===
In mid-2013, there were rumors that Danity Kane would be reuniting. On August 25, 2013, Danity Kane appeared at the 2013 MTV Video Music Awards (without D. Woods, who did not return to the group), announcing they were back together.

On May 15, 2014, the band's first official reunion single "Lemonade" was released on the internet via Official Danity Kane Soundcloud. The single was produced by The Stereotypes, and features rapper Tyga over a production sampled from Grindin', the 2002 hit song by Clipse

On May 16, 2014, on the first night of their #NOFilterTour at The Fillmore in San Francisco after performing several songs with Danity Kane, Fimbres announced that she would be leaving the group at the end of their tour in desire for engagement and focus on her new family and Aubrey O'Day, Shannon Bex, and Dawn Richard would be continuing on as a trio.

=== Guest appearances ===
Fimbres' sings in a song called "Dip With You" on Baby Bash's album, Cyclone. She also appeared as Dorothy in Oz: The Musical, alongside Nathaniel Flatt of V-Factory, from December 4–13, 2009. On December 30, 2010, a snippet of the O'Day and Fimbres' collaboration, "Ego Trip", was leaked on the Internet, but the track was never finished.

On March 11, 2011, Fimbres made an appearance on O'Day's reality show, All About Aubrey, where they recorded a song titled "Ego Trip" for O'Day's solo album to be released in 2011, although their single was never released. In the episode, according to O'Day, Fimbres drops out of a show she would do with O'Day, telling O'Day that she did not want to be in the business anymore.

In 2015, Fimbres appeared on her former band member Dawn Richard's third studio album Blackheart on a song entitled "Phoenix". The record was previously written and recorded for their then-upcoming album DK3 but soon after completion Danity Kane reportedly passed on the song. Richard has stated that she was about to sell the record to another artist when Aundrea convinced Richard to not only keep the record for her album Blackheart but also keep Fimbres' verse on the song because they had both always loved the song from the beginning.

== Discography ==
Danity Kane albums

- Danity Kane (2006)
- Welcome to the Dollhouse (2008)
