= Show Stopper (Danity Kane song) =

Single by Danity Kane featuring Yung Joc

from the album Danity Kane
- Released: August 2006
- Studio: The Hit Factory (New York City)
- Length: 3:51
- Label: Bad Boy; Atlantic
- Songwriters: Angela Hunte; Krystal Oliver; Calvin Puckett; Frank Romano; James Scheffer
- Producer: Jim Jonsin

Danity Kane singles chronology
"Show Stopper" (2006)	"Ride for You" (2006)

Yung Joc singles chronology
"I Love You" (2006)	"Show Stopper" (2006)	"1st Time" (2006)

Music video
- "Show Stopper" on YouTube

"Show Stopper" is the debut single by American girl group Danity Kane. It was written by Angela Hunte, Krystal Oliver, Calvin Puckett, Frank Romano, and Jim Jonsin for their self-titled debut album (2006), while production was helmed by the latter. The song features guest vocals by Atlanta-based rapper Yung Joc. "Show Stopper" was released as the album's lead single in 2006 in the United States and in October 2006 in Europe. It peaked at number 8 on the US Billboard Hot 100 chart and also entered the top 30 in Germany, becoming their highest-charting single to date.

== Background ==
"Show Stopper" written by Angela Hunte, Krystal Oliver, Calvin Puckett, Frank Romano, and Jim Jonsin, and produced by the latter. The recording of the song was tracked while filming the third season of Making the Band. Band member Aundrea Fimbres cited the song as her favorite Danity Kane track to perform, telling The News-Times in 2007: "'Show Stopper' is fun to play because people, as soon as they hear the beginning of it, they're like (Yeaaahhh!). And everyone's dancing. Everyone's up in their seats. So I think that you really feed off the energy. You see them doing that, so you go even more nuts on stage."

== Chart performance ==
"Show Stopper" debuted at number 17 on the US Billboard Hot 100 in the week of September 2, 2006, being the highest-charting new entry that week. While the song reached its peak position of number 8 in its second week, popularity declined soon and it eventually fell out of the top 25. However, about five weeks after the radio release, it started re-gathering airplay and subsequently moved back up the Hot 100, again peaking at number 12. "Show Stopper" also entered the top 40 of the Hot R&B/Hip-Hop Songs chart and peaked at number four on the Rhythmic chart. Beyond that, the song had attracted six million streams on the group's Myspace page and 1.5 million viewings on YouTube by September 2006.

== Music video ==
The music video for "Show Stopper" was directed by Dominican film maker Jessy Terrero and was filmed in various locations throughout Los Angeles, California between June 27 and 28, 2006. The final version of the video premiered at the end of Making the Video on MTV on August 4, 2006. It reached a peak position of number two on MTV's countdown show Total Request Live on September 8, 2006.

Thematically, the video starts with the band members in the recording studio listening to their album cut "Want It" with Diddy as he tells them to go straight to bed and not go out and club hop. Then the girls go into a van, get "made up", and then head out partying during a night out on the town in expensive cars looking for boys to flirt with. The video ends with the girls dancing on the Hollywood Boulevard. Apart from rapper Yung Joc whose part was filmed inside his van while he was on his way back to the airport due to a lack of time, Diddy also recorded a sequence with his verse in the song which appears in the remix version of the music video and features only the girl's full dance portion of the original version.

== Track listings ==
All tracks written by Angela Hunte, Krystal Oliver, Calvin Puckett, Frank Romano, and Jim Jonsin.

CD, maxi single
No.	Title	Length
1.	"Show Stopper" (main version)	3:51
2.	"Show Stopper" (remix)	4:41
3.	"Show Stopper" (instrumental)	3:51
4.	"Show Stopper" (a cappella)	3:50

== Credits and personnel ==
- Sean "Diddy" Combs – executive producer
- Joe Gonzalez – recording assistant
- Angela Hunte – writer
- Rob Marks – recording engineer
- Krystal Oliver – writer
- Harve Pierre – co-executive producer
- Calvin Puckett – writer
- Frank Romano – writer
- Jim Jonsin – producer, writer

== Charts ==
=== Weekly charts ===
Weekly performance for "Show Stopper"
Chart (2006)	Peak position
Austria (Ö3 Austria Top 40)	60
Canada CHR/Top 40 (Billboard)	37
Germany (GfK)	27
US Billboard Hot 100	8
US Hot R&B/Hip-Hop Songs (Billboard)	33
US Pop Airplay (Billboard)	12
US Rhythmic Airplay (Billboard)	4

=== Year-end charts ===
Year-end performance for "Show Stopper"
Chart (2006)	Position
US Billboard Hot 100	79

== Certifications ==
Certifications and sales for "Show Stopper"
Region	Certification	Certified units/sales
United States (RIAA)	Gold	500,000^{^}
^{^} Shipments figures based on certification alone.

== Release history ==
Release dates and formats for "Show Stopper"
Region	Date	Format	Label(s)	Ref.
United States	September 12, 2006	Mainstream airplay	Bad Boy; Atlantic	
