= Damaged (Danity Kane song) =

2008 single by Danity Kane

Single by Danity Kane

from the album Welcome to the Dollhouse
- Released: January 29, 2008
- Studio: Circle House Recording (Miami, Florida)
- Length: 4:06 (album version); 3:38 (radio edit)
- Label: Bad Boy
- Songwriters: Justin Walker; Sean Combs; Mario Winans; Jonathan Yip; Jeremy Reeves; Micayle McKinney; Ray Romulos; Shannon "Slam" Lawrence; Rose Marie Tan; James Smith
- Producers: Stereotypes; Diddy (co.); Mario Winans (add.)

Danity Kane singles chronology
"Ride for You" (2006)	"Damaged" (2008)	"Bad Girl" (2008)

Music video
- "Damaged" on YouTube

"Damaged" is a song by American girl group Danity Kane. It was written by Justin Walker, Sean Combs, Mario Winans, Jonathan Yip, Edward Logan, Jeremy Reeves, Micayle McKinney, Ray Romulos, Shannon "Slam" Lawrence, Rose Marie Tan, and James Smith. The song was produced by the Stereotypes, with additional production from Combs and Winans, for the band's second studio album, Welcome to the Dollhouse (2008).

Released as the album's lead single on January 29, 2008, in the United States, the song reached number 10 on the US Billboard Hot 100, where it became the band's second top-10 hit. In addition, "Damaged" reached the top 30 on the Canadian Hot 100, their first song to chart there. In 2017, Billboard ranked the song number 38 on their list of the "100 Greatest Girl Group Songs of All Time".

== Background ==
Originally intended for Beyoncé to record for her third studio album, I Am... Sasha Fierce (2008), the song was passed to Danity Kane due to Beyoncé's extended recording period. Yip recalled that the track had been placed on hold for I Am... Sasha Fierce, but when the album’s release was delayed, the team decided it made little sense to wait, and within five days, they flew to a recording session in Miami with Diddy and Danity Kane to record the song.

== Commercial performance ==
The song was released to legal digital download sites on January 29, 2008, in the United States. It reached the top ten in the US and Ukraine.

== Music video ==
The music video for "Damaged" was directed by Syndrome and premiered on March 11, 2008, on MTV's TRL, where it peaked at number 3 on its countdown. In its entirety it premiered on MTV.com. The video also premiered as the 'New Joint' on BET's 106 & Park on March 20, 2008. The song peaked at No. 6.

The video features the members of Danity Kane in a futuristic theme. The pink special effects are used to represent the setting of being within an actual heart. Throughout the video, choreography is done along with the music and the girls are shown in a futuristic room with screens of them performing the choreography, which they see while laying down on a futuristic bed. Towards the end of the music video, the beds that the girls are lying on close to form a heart, which happens to be the heart of a man on a stretcher in a hospital. Medical staff, who turn out to be the members of Danity Kane, try to revive him. The music video then transitions to a setting where the man is in his bedroom with a note on him saying "Tired of the damage – DK".

== Awards ==
Year	Awards	Award	Results	Ref.
2008	MTV Video Music Awards	Best Dancing in a Video	Nominated	
2008	MTV Video Music Awards	Best Pop Video	Nominated	

== Formats and track listings ==
Australian single

1. "Damaged" (album version) – 4:06
2. "Damaged" (Global Factory Radio Edit) – 3:25
3. "Damaged" (DJ Richie Rich X-Mix Remix) – 4:21

US "Dance Mixes" digital release

1. "Damaged" (Friscia & Lamboy Club Mix) – 9:05
2. "Damaged" (Global Factory Mix Club Mix) – 7:49
3. "Damaged" (DJ Richie Rich X-Mix Remix) – 4:21
4. "Damaged" (Friscia & Lamboy Radio Edit) – 4:44
5. "Damaged" (Global Factory Radio Edit) – 3:25
6. "Damaged" (Friscia & Lamboy Dub) – 8:55
7. "Damaged" (Friscia & Lamboy Club Mix No. 2) – 6:33

US "Urban Remixes" digital release

1. "Damaged" (Remix featuring Fabolous) – 4:07
2. "Damaged" (Remix featuring Gorilla Zoe) – 4:08
3. "Damaged" (Remix featuring Fabolous) (clean version) – 4:07
4. "Damaged" (Remix featuring Gorilla Zoe) (clean version) – 4:08

== Charts ==
=== Weekly charts ===
Chart (2008)	Peak position
Australia (ARIA)	51
Australian Urban (ARIA)	10
Canada (Canadian Hot 100)	26
Canada CHR/Top 40 (Billboard)	11
Canada Hot AC (Billboard)	25
Global Dance Songs (Billboard)	20
US Billboard Hot 100	10
US Dance Club Songs (Billboard)	24
US Dance/Mix Show Airplay (Billboard)	3
US Pop Airplay (Billboard)	6
US Rhythmic Airplay (Billboard)	9

=== Year-end charts ===
Chart (2008)	Rank
US Billboard Hot 100	42
US Mainstream Top 40 (Billboard)	32

== Certifications ==
Region	Certification	Certified units/sales
United States (RIAA)	Platinum	1,000,000^{*}
^{*} Sales figures based on certification alone.

== Release history ==
Release dates for "Damaged"
Region	Date	Label	Ref.
United States	January 29, 2008	Bad Boy	
Canada	April 15, 2008	Bad Boy	
United Kingdom	August 18, 2008	Bad Boy	
Australia	August 25, 2008	Bad Boy	
