= Frank Romano =

American producer, songwriter and musician

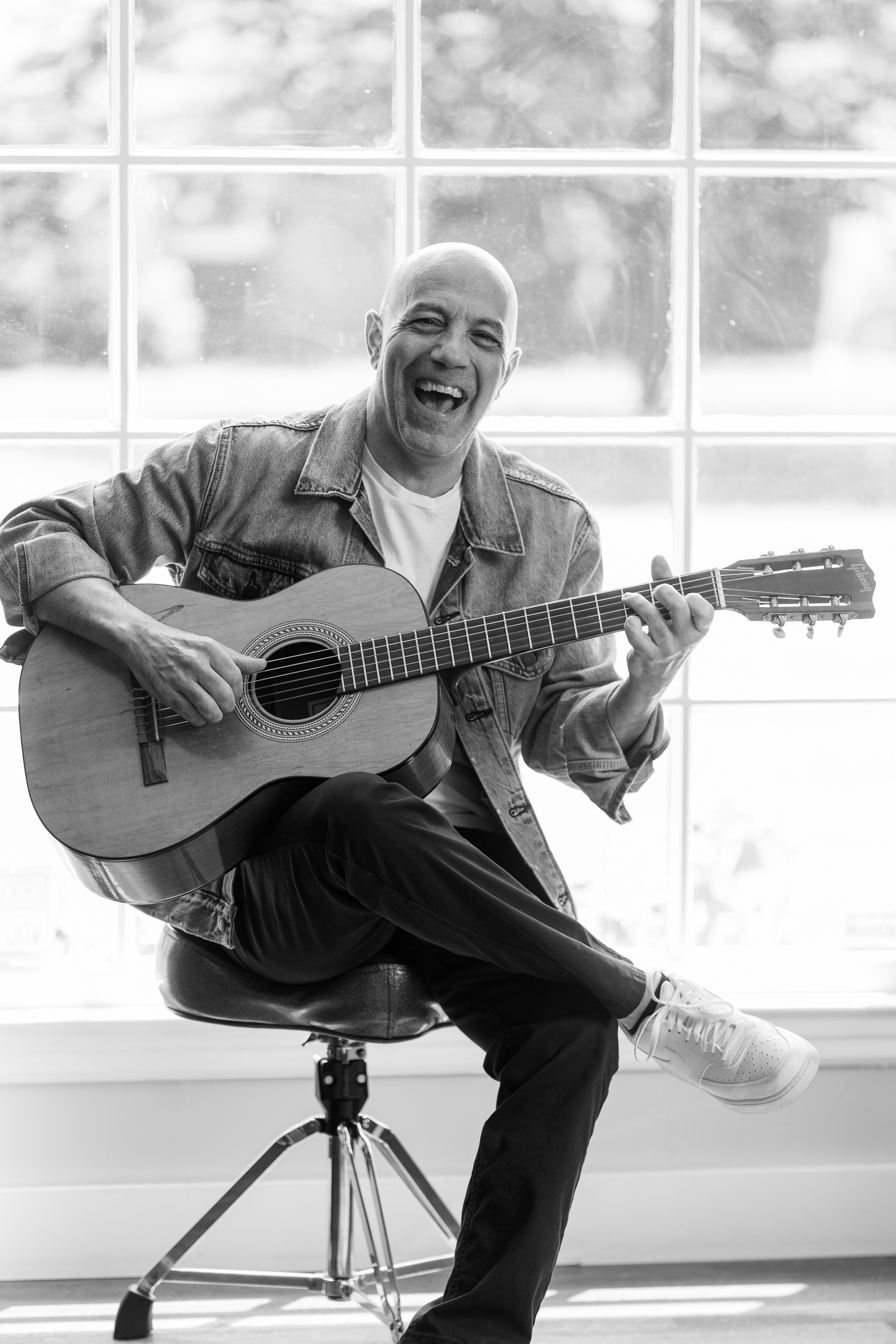

Background information
- Origin: Cleveland, Ohio, U.S.
- Genres: Hip hop, R&B, electronica
- Occupations: Songwriter, record producer, musician
- Instruments: Guitar, bass

Frank Romano is an American songwriter, record producer and guitarist.

== Career ==
Currently based in Nashville, Tennessee, Romano grew up in a musical family in the suburbs of Cleveland, Ohio, where he was the guitarist for the Cincinnati funk band, Freebass (now known as Freekbass), a group produced by Bootsy Collins.

Romano has toured and performed internationally with Rob Thomas, Mary J. Blige, Toni Braxton, and Kanye West, among others. He has appeared alongside many of these artists on numerous national television shows, performing on Jay Leno, the Late Show with David Letterman, The View, The Ellen DeGeneres Show, MTV, The Today Show, and Good Morning America. In 2005, he performed with Rob Thomas at the Live-8 Concert, in Philadelphia, Pennsylvania, and can also be seen on Rob Thomas's DVD, Live At Red Rocks, contributing in his backing band on guitar.

Aside from touring, Romano continues to work in the studio as a songwriter, producer and session guitarist. He has worked on recordings with Justin Timberlake, Kanye West, Akon, Usher, and Rob Thomas, and has collaborated with some prominent music producers.

Romano is represented by the worldwide publishing company, Reach Music, and has signed a joint venture with Reach Music and BMG. He has been recognized with eight ASCAP songwriter awards for his work on the songs, "I Need a Girl" (Part 2) by P. Diddy. "Don't Change" by Musiq Soulchild, Usher's, "There Goes My Baby", two awards (2011 and 2012) for Nelly's hit, "Just A Dream". and his most recent award in 2023 for Bailey Zimmerman's country music hit, "Religiously".

== Discography: single, DVD and studio album credits ==
Year	Title	Format	Artist	Credit
2000	Aijuswanaseing	Album	Musiq Soulchild	Guitar
2001	Mars/Venus	Album	Koffee Brown	Composer/Guitar
2001	Sunny Days	Album	Allure	Guitar
2001	JLO	Album	Jennifer Lopez	Guitar
2001	Isley Brother's Eternal 1	Album	Isley Brothers	Composer/Guitar
2001	Paradigm	Album (Vinyl)	Osunlade	Composer/Guitar
2001	Rader Du/Blackman	Album (Vinyl)	Osunlade	Composer/Guitar
2001	Dr. Dolittle 2	Album (Original Soundtrack)	Various Artists	Guitar
2001	Rush Hour II	Album (Original Soundtrack)	Various Artists	Guitar
2001	Mahogany Stone	Album	Angie Stone	Guitar
2001	8 Days Of Christmas	Album	Destiny's Child	Guitar
2001	Child of the Ghetto	Album (Vinyl)	G. Dep	Guitar
2001	Diamant	Album (Vinyl)	Osunlade	Composer/Guitar
2001	Special Place	Single	Kim Burrell	Composer/Guitar
2002	Worthy Of	Album: Justified+ (UK)	Justin Timberlake	Composer/Guitar
2002	Dawn	Album	Dawn Robinson	Composer/Guitar
2002	Star Kitty Revenge	Album	Joi	Composer/Guitar
2002	International Affairs v2.0	Album	Vikter Duplaix	Guitar (Rhythm)
2002	DJ-Kicks	Album	Vikter Duplaix	Guitar
2002	Montell Jordan	Album	Montell Jordan	Guitar
2002	No Half Steppin	Album	Sharissa	Guitar
2002	Hold It Down	Album (Vinyl)	4 Hero feat. Lady Alma	Composer/Guitar
2002	Home and Garden An Invitation – Osunlade Remix	Album (Vinyl)	Osunlade Yoruba Soul Remixes	Guitar
2002	Juslisen	Album	Musiq Soulchild	Arranger/Composer/Guitar
2002	Don't Change	Single	Musiq Soulchild	Composer/Guitar
2002	Half Crazy	Single	Musiq Soulchild	Composer/Guitar
2002	Juslisen (Special Edition)	Album	Musiq Soulchild	Arranger/Composer/Guitar
2002	Something Wikid This Way Comes	Album	Midwikid	Guitar
2002	We Invented The Remix	Album	P-Diddy	Producer/Composer/Guitar
2002	I Need A Girl (Part 2)	Single	P-Diddy	Producer/Composer/Guitar
2002	Kiss	Album	Trin-i-tee 5:7	Guitar
2002	Chapter 2: The Voice	Album	Syleena Johnson	Composer/Guitar
2002	Transporter	Album (Original Soundtrack)	Various Artists	Guitar
2002	Redemption	Album	Benzino	Guitar
2002	Floetic	Album	Floetry	Guitar
2002	Offering	Album	Osunlade	Guitar
2002	This Is Who I Am	Album	Heather Headley	Guitar
2002	Love Story	Album	Vivian Green	Guitar
2002	Drumline	Album (Original Soundtrack)	Various Artists	Guitar
2002	Source Presents: Hip Hop Hits, Vol. 6	Album	Various Artists	Producer/Composer/Guitar
2003	"Live In London"	DVD	Justin Timberlake	Composer/Guitar
2003	"Soulstar"	Album	Musiq	Composer/Guitar
2003	"And Then..."	Album	Joe	Producer/Composer/Guitar/Engineer
2003	"Ride With U feat. G-Unit"	Single	Joe	Producer/Composer/Guitar/Engineer
2003	"Conception: An Interpretation of Stevie Wonder's Songs"	Album	Various Artists	Guitar
2003	"Guess What/Guess Again"	Album	Syleena Johnson	Guitar
2003	"Swatch Together"	Album	Various Artists	Guitar
2003	"Excursions"	Album	Modaji	Guitar
2003	"Bone Deep"	Album	Jeff Bradshaw	Guitar (Acoustic)
2003	"Bone Deep (Japan Bonus Track)"	Album	Jeff Bradshaw	Guitar (Acoustic)
2004	"Bad Boy's 10th Anniversary...The Hits"	Album/DVD	Various Artists	Producer/Composer/Guitar
2004	"Hurt No More"	Album	Mario Winans	Composer/Guitar
2004	"Power of Soul (Tribute to Jimi Hendrix)"	Album	Musiq Soulchild	Guitar
2004	"Johnson Family Reunion"	Album (Original Soundtrack)	Patti LaBelle	Guitar
2004	"Introducing Tortured Soul"	Album (Vinyl)	Tortured Soul	Guitar
2004	"Beautifully Human: Words and Sounds, Vol. 2"	Album	Jill Scott	Composer/Guitar
2004	"Time To Share"	Album	Toshi Kubota	Guitar
2004	"Turning Point"	Album	Mario	Composer/Guitar
2005	"The First Lady"	Album	Faith Evans	Composer/Guitar
2005	"Live-Aid"	DVD	Rob Thomas	Guitar
2005	"Bedda At Home"	Single (Shadowboxer Original Soundtrack)	Jill Scott	Composer
2006	"Uncovered/Covered"	Album	Kenny Lattimore & Chante Moore	Composer/Guitar
2006	"The Breakthrough"	Album	Mary J. Blige	Composer/Guitar
2006	"Left of Center"	Album	Javier	Producer/Composer/Guitar
2006	"Danity Kane"	Album	Danity Kane	Composer/Guitar
2006	"Showstopper"	Single	Danity Kane	Composer/Guitar
2006	"All I Got Is Love"	Album	J. Shin	Composer/Guitar/Bass
2006	"Mario Vazquez"	Album	Mario Vazquez	Composer/Guitar
2006	"The Return"	Album	Ruben Studdard	Composer/Guitar
2006	"Only Hits"	Album	Danity Kane	Composer/Guitar
2007	"Saturday Night Special"	Album	Pretty Ricky	Composer/Guitar
2007	"Holla: The Best of Trin-I-Tee 5:7"	Album	Trin-i-tee 5:7	Guitar
2007	"Nickelodeon Kids Choice"	Album	Danity Kane	Composer/Guitar
2007	"Rockstar Mentality"	Album	Shop Boyz	Guitar
2007	"Smooth Jazz Tribute"	Album	Musiq Soulchild/Smooth Jazz All Stars	Composer
2007	"Cyclone"	Album	Baby Bash	Composer/Guitar/Sitar
2007	"Nana"	Single	Baby Bash	Composer/Guitar/Sitar
2007	"Face Off"	Album/DVD	Bow Wow & Omarion	Composer/Guitar
2007	"Epiphany"	Album	T-Pain	Composer/Guitar
2007	"Church"	Single	T-Pain	Composer/Guitar
2008	"Something To Be Tour: Live at Red Rocks"	DVD	Rob Thomas	Guitar
2008	"Live In Paris"	Album/DVD	Jill Scott	Composer
2008	"Colby O"	Album	Colby O'Donis	Guitar
2008	"Unexpected"	Album	Michelle Williams	Guitar/Bass
2008	"Death of Adam"	Album	88-Keys	Guitar
2008	David Archuleta	Album	David Archuleta	Guitar
2008	"Thr33 Ringz"	Album	T-Pain	Composer/Guitar
2008	"Thr33 Ringz (Deluxe Addition)"	Album	T-Pain	Composer/Guitar
2008	"Freedom"	Album	Akon	Composer/Guitar
2008	"Freedom: Asian Tour Addition"	Bonus DVD	Akon	Composer/Guitar
2008	"Step Up 2"	Album (Original Soundtrack)	T-Pain	Guitar
2009	"Guilt"	Album	MIMS	Guitar
2009	"This Is Us"	Album	Backstreet Boys	Composer/Guitar
2009	"This Is Us"	Bonus DVD	Backstreet Boys	Composer/Guitar
2009	"Remembered Well"	Bonus Track (From Cradlesong)	Rob Thomas	Composer
2010	"Raymond v Raymond"	Album	Usher	Composer/Guitar
2010	"There Goes My Baby"	Single	Usher	Composer/Guitar
2010	"Versus"	Album	Usher	Composer/Guitar
2010	"Rise Up"	Album	Cypress Hill	Composer/Guitar/Bass
2010	"Armada Latina feat. Marc Anthony"	Single	Cypress Hill	Guitar/Bass
2010	"Sex and the City 2"	Album (Original Soundtrack)	Cee-lo	Guitar
2010	"Ladykiller"	Album	Cee-lo	Guitar
2010	"Suddenly Yours"	Album	Allstar Weekend	Producer/Composer/Guitar
2010	"Just a Dream"	Single	Nelly	Composer/Guitar
2010	"5.0"	Album	Nelly	Composer/Guitar
2010	"Nelly Smooth Jazz Tribute, Vol. 2"	Album	Nelly	Composer
2010	"Erase Me feat. Kanye West"	Single	Kid Cudi	Composer/Guitar/Bass
2010	"Southern Hospitality"	Single	Hal Linton	Composer/Guitar
2010	"Now 36: That's What I Call Music"	Album (Single)	Various (Nelly "Just A Dream")	Composer/Guitar
2011	"Gone" (From Album, "Where You At")	Single	Jennifer Hudson	Guitar
2011	"Castle's Made of Sand" (From Album, "Planet Pit" )	Single	Pitbull	Bass/Guitar
2011	"Right There" ft 50 Cent (From Album, "Killer Love")	Single	Nicole Scherzinger	Composer/Guitar/Bass
2011	"Maybe I'm Amazed"	American Idol: iTunes Singles	James Durbin	Guitar/Bass
2011	"I Could Fall In Love"	American Idol: iTunes Singles	Karen Rodreiquez	Guitar/Bass
2011	"I'm The Only One"	American Idol: iTunes Singles	Lauren Alaina	Guitar/Bass
2011	"Alone"	American Idol: iTunes Singles	Jacob Lusk	Guitar/Bass
2011	"Tracks Of My Tears"	American Idol: iTunes Singles	Paul McDonald	Guitar/Bass
2011	"For Once In My Life"	American Idol: iTunes Singles	Scotty McCreery	Guitar/Bass
2011	"Daniel"	American Idol: iTunes Singles	Theia	Guitar/Bass
2011	"Bennie and the Jets"	American Idol: iTunes Singles	Haley Reinhart	Guitar/Bass
2011	"While My Guitar Gently Weeps"	American Idol: iTunes Singles	James Durbin	Guitar/Bass
2011	"Have You Ever Seen The Rain"	American Idol: iTunes Singles	Casey Abrams	Guitars/Bass
2011	"Rolling in the deep"	American Idol: iTunes Singles	Haley Reinhart	Guitars/Bass
2011	"Harder to Breathe"	American Idol: iTunes Singles	Casey Abrams	Guitar
2011	"Will You Still Love Me Tomorrow"	American Idol: iTunes Singles	James Durbin	Guitars/Bass
2011	"Tonight you mine"	American Idol: iTunes Singles	(Duet) James Durbin & Jacob Lusk	Guitars/Bass
2011	"You've Got A Friend"	American Idol: iTunes Singles	Scott Mecreedy	Guitars
2011	"I Feel The Earth Move"	American Idol: iTunes Singles	(Duet) Haley Reinhart & Casey Abrams	Guitars
2011	"Can't Live"	American Idol: iTunes Singles	James Durbin	Guitars
2011	"Unchained Melody"	American Idol: iTunes Singles	Lauren Alaina	Guitars
2011	"The Earth Song"	American Idol: iTunes Singles	Haley Reinhart	Guitars
2011	"I Who Have Nothing" Shirley Bassey	American Idol: iTunes Singles	Haley Reinhart	Guitars
2011	"Young Blood"	American Idol: iTunes Singles	Scotty McCreery	Guitars
2011	"Where Were You (When The World Stopped Turning)	American Idol: iTunes Singles	Scotty McCreery	Guitars
2011	"What is and what should never be"	American Idol: iTunes Singles	Haley Reinhart	Guitars
2011	"You Outta Know"	American Idol: iTunes Singles	Haley Reinhart	Guitars/Bass
2011	"Future vs. History"	Album	Jason Derulo	Producer/Composer/Guitar
2011	"4am"	Single	Melanie Fiona	Guitar
2011	"Role Model" ft. Justin Timberlake	Single	Freesol	Composer
2011	"No More" ft. Neyo	Single	LL Cool J	Composer/Guitar
2011	"Right There" ft. 50 Cent	The Remixes, iTunes Single	Nicole Scherzinger	Composer
2011	"Joe, Live from Japan"	Album	Joe	Composer/Producer
2011	"The Remedy"	Album	Jagged Edge	Composer/Guitar
2012	"Hold On"	Album: Tomahawk Technique	Sean Paul	Guitars
2012	"Hardly breathing"	Album: Two Eleven	Brandy	Guitars
2012	"Paint This House"	Album: Two Eleven	Brandy	Guitars
2012	"Daddy's Good Girl"	Album: My Life	Monica	Guitars
2012	"A Man Who Has Everything"	Album: My Life	Monica	Guitars
2012	"It All Belongs To me"	Album: My Life	Brandy & Monica	Guitars
2012	"What Are We Doing Here"	Album: Strange Clouds 'Deluxe Edition'	B.O.B	Composer/Guitars
2012	"Dive"	Album: Looking 4 Myself	Usher	Producer/Composer/Guitars
2012	"Representin"	Album: Ludaversal (release date: 2013)	Ludacris feat. Kelly Rowland	Composer/Guitars
2012	"Long Live A$ap"	Album: Long Live A$AP	A$AP Rocky	Producer/Composer/Guitars
2013	"Just The Way You Are/Just A Dream" (Mash-Up)	Album: 2012 Pitch Perfect Soundtrack	Various	Composer
2013	"M.O"	Album	Nelly feat. Florida Georgia Line	Guitars
2013	"Drink Freely"	Album: Excuse My French	French Montana	Guitars
2013	"Hell of a Morning"	Album: Purple Heart	Plies	Guitars
2013	"Gang Signs"	Album: Dear Sallie Mae	Tiara Thomas	Guitars
2013	"Popular"	Album: Dear Sallie Mae	Tiara Thomas	Composer/Bass/Guitars
2013	"Tell Me Something"	Album: Dear Sallie Mae	Tiara Thomas	Guitars
2013	"Little Dancer"	Single	Leroy Sanchez	Producer/Guitars/Bass/Drums
2013	"Beautiful Life"	Single	Sebastian Mikael	Guitars/Bass
2013	"Dive"	Soundtrack: Baggage Claim	Usher	Producer/Composer/Guitars
2014	"A Million"	Soundtrack: About Last Night	John Legend	Production/Composer/Guitars
2014	"Cadillactia"	Album	Big Krit	Guitars
2014	"Aloha"	Album	Cisco Adler	Guitars
2015	"Fool For You"	Single	Curtis Fields	Composer/Guitars
2015	"TTLO"	Album	Rico Love	Guitars
2015	"Golden Moments"	Album	Jill Scott	Composer/Guitars
2015	"I Adore You"	Single	Jill Scott	Composer/Guitars
2015	"Lie to Me"	Album: The Great Unknown	Rob Thomas	Composer
2015	"Merry Go Round"	Album: General Admission	Machine Gun Kelly (Interscope/Bad Boy)	Guitars, Composer
2017	"Quit"	Single	Cashmere Cat ft. Ariana Grande	Composer
2017	"Damn Good Lover"	Album: Buffalo	Shelly Fairchild	Composer
2017	"Bandit Queen"	Album: Bandit Queen (title track)	Hannah Blaylock	Composer
2017	I Love R&B [Ministry of Sound]	Album	Various	Composer
2018	Coloured	Album	Priscilla Renea	Composer

== Awards ==
- 2002 ASCAP Rhythm and Soul Award for work on: "Don't Change" by Musiq Soulchild
- 2003 ASCAP Rhythm and Soul Award in the R&B/Hip-Hop Category for work on: "I Need A Girl (Part 2) by P. Diddy & Ginuwine feat. Loon, Mario Winans & Tami Ruggeri
- 2003 ASCAP Rhythm and Soul Award in the Rap Category for work on: "I Need A Girl (Part 2) by P. Diddy & Ginuwine feat. Loon, Mario Winans & Tami Ruggeri
- 2004 ASCAP Pop Music Award for work on: "I Need A Girl (Part 2) by P. Diddy & Ginuwine feat. Loon, Mario Winans & Tami Ruggeri
- 2010 ASCAP Rhythm and Soul Award in the R&B/Hip-Hop Category for work on: "There Goes My Baby" by Usher
- 2011 ASCAP Pop Music Award for work on: "Just A Dream" by Nelly
- 2012 ASCAP Pop Music Award for work on: "Just A Dream" by Nelly
- 2023 ASCAP Country Music Award for work on: "Religiously" by Bailey Zimmerman
