= Danity Kane =

American music group

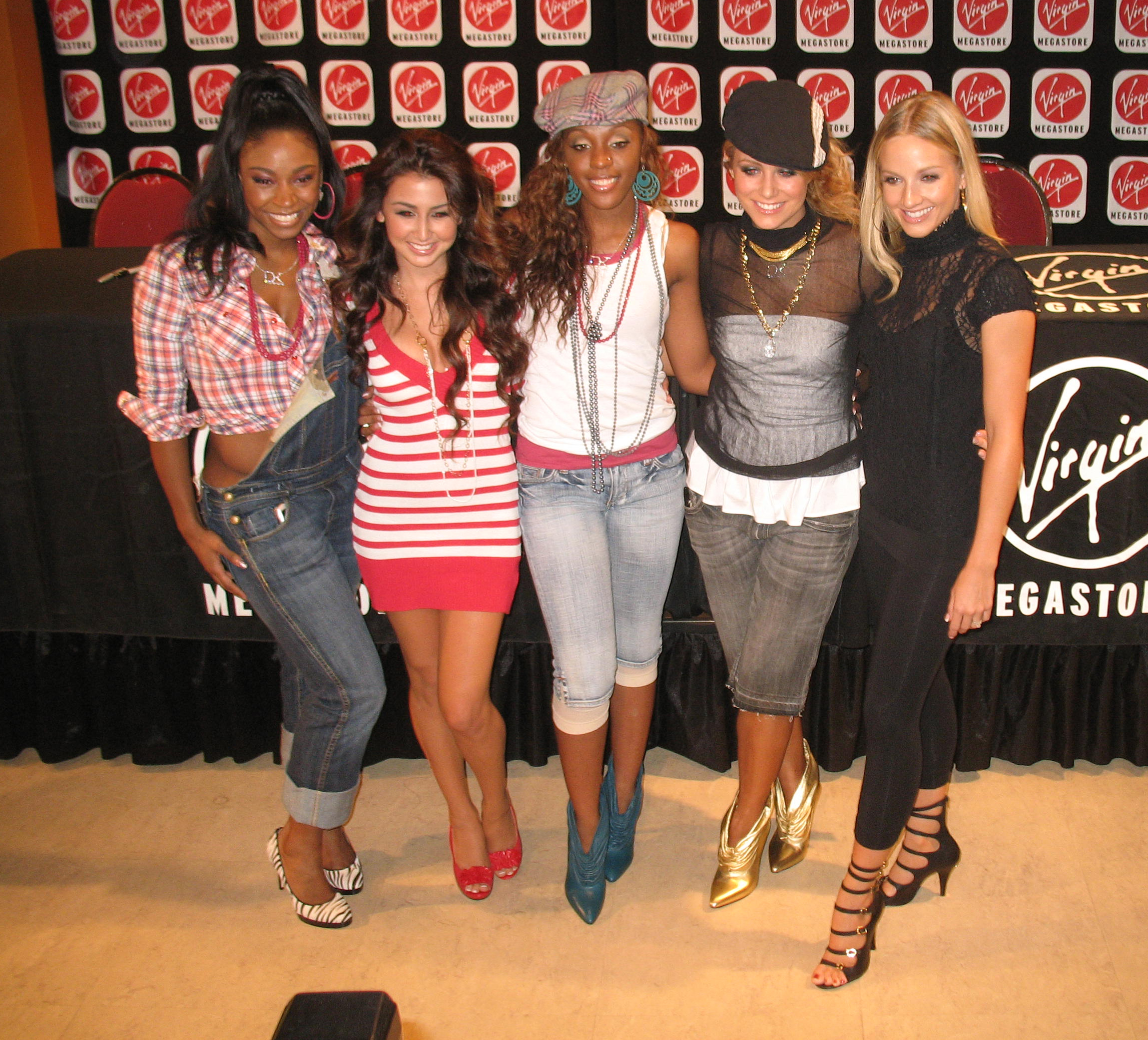
- The original line-up of Danity Kane in September 2006. (L-R) Wanita "D. Woods" Woodgett, Aundrea Fimbres, Dawn Richard, Aubrey O'Day and Shannon Bex.

Background information
- Also known as: DK
- Origin: New York City, U.S.
- Genres: R&B; hip hop; pop; dance
- Works: Danity Kane discography
- Years active: 2005–2009; 2013–2014; 2018–2020; 2025–present
- Labels: BMG; Stereotypes; Bad Boy; Atlantic; Warner
- Spinoffs: Dirty Money; Dumblonde
- Members: Aubrey O'Day; Aundrea Fimbres; D. Woods
- Past members: Shannon Bex; Dawn Richard
- Website: danitykane.com

Danity Kane are an American music group composed of Aubrey O'Day, D. Woods, Shannon Bex, Dawn Richard and Aundrea Fimbres. Formed on the third iteration of MTV's Making the Band reality television series in 2005, they were signed to Bad Boy Records by Sean Combs. Danity Kane's self-titled debut studio album was released in 2006 and achieved success in the United States, shipping a million copies domestically, while spawning two singles with top 10 single "Show Stopper" and the ballad "Ride for You". Their second studio album, Welcome to the Dollhouse, was released in 2008 following the release of their second top 10 single "Damaged". The band became the first female group in Billboard history to debut their first two albums at the top of the charts.

Despite initial success, tension in the group led to a meeting with Diddy where, in the October 2008 finale episode of Making the Band 4, he removed O'Day and Woodgett from the group. The three remaining members of the group carried on with previously scheduled promotional events before officially disbanding in early 2009. All group members were ultimately released from their contracts with Bad Boy Records later within the year. In 2013, four of the five group members (O'Day, Bex, Richard and Fimbres) made an official announcement regarding their reunion at the 2013 MTV Video Music Awards; however, on May 16, 2014, the first night of their reunion tour in San Francisco, Fimbres announced her departure from the group due to wanting to start her family, leaving O'Day, Bex and Richard to continue as a trio.

On August 8, 2014, after a fight in the recording studio between members O'Day and Richard, O'Day and Bex announced publicly that Danity Kane had disbanded again. Although they disbanded, their third studio album, DK3, was released in October 2014. Following the second disbandment, Richard continued to release solo music while O'Day and Bex formed the duo Dumblonde. In August 2018, the trio announced that they would reunite and tour together. O'Day and Richard released new music as a duo under the Danity Kane name in 2020. The group stopped posting on their official Instagram account in March 2020, leaving the group on an unofficial hiatus until 2025 when they announced the Untold Chapter Tour, featuring the return of O'Day, Woodgett and Fimbres. Shortly after the conclusion of the tour, O'Day announced she would no longer work with the group, leaving Woodgett and Fimbres to continue as a duo.

== History ==
=== 2004–2005: Making the Band 3 ===
In 2004, producer Sean Combs returned with Making the Band 3, the third iteration of the Making the Band television series, in search of the next female supergroup. With the help of choreographer Laurie Ann Gibson, vocal trainer Doc Holiday and talent manager Johnny Wright, he set out on a multi-city search and invited 20 young singers out of almost 10,000 young women to live and compete for positions in the group in New York City. When seven women remained, Combs became discontented with the level of talent remaining in the competition and decided not to form a band. He did, however, feel three contestants deserved another chance, including then-best friends Aubrey O'Day and Aundrea Fimbres, whose close bond originally formed early in the season. The three contestants became the first to appear in season 2 of the show.

At the start of the second season, Combs once again pressed his team to audition new young women for the group. Finally, 20 young women were chosen and moved into a loft in New York City. Viewers had become invested in O'Day and Fimbres's friendship, naming them "the AUs" and "Aubrea" (portmanteaus of their first names), as they watched the two compete all over again for positions in the group. As the competition's challenges increased, their friendship seemed to become the foundation upon which the group was being built. In addition, O'Day emerged as the show's breakout star. After weeks of dance and singing lessons, promotional appearances, and a performance in front of 10,000 at a Backstreet Boys concert at Nissan Pavilion in Bristow, Virginia, 11 contestants remained, including O'Day and Fimbres. The finalists were sent home for three months, told to polish up, and return for the final stretch in November 2005.

On the second season's finale, on Tuesday, November 15, 2005, the show's ratings broke MTV records as millions of viewers watched to see the group officially formed. Five of the 11 remaining contestants were chosen: O'Day first, Wanita "D. Woods" Woodgett second, Shannon Bex third, Dawn Richard fourth, and Fimbres last. The third season of Making the Band 3 tracked the development and struggles of the new band — from then on known as "Danity Kane" (a name taken from a female anime superhero created and drawn by Richard). The group would later be featured on the second and third seasons of Making the Band 4 with new male R&B group Day26, as well as new solo artist Donnie Klang.

=== 2006–2007: Danity Kane ===
After months of recording, the band's self-titled debut album was released to mixed reviews on August 22, 2006, in the United States. Produced by Timbaland, Scott Storch, Rodney Jerkins, Mario Winans and Ryan Leslie among others, the album sold over 90,000 copies in the first day of release, and over 234,000 in the first week of release. It debuted at number one on the U.S. Billboard 200 albums chart. The album received a platinum certification from the RIAA in November 2006. The album's lead single "Show Stopper", produced by Jim Jonsin, was serviced to radio on August 4, 2006, and subsequently debuted at number 17 on the Billboard Hot 100 and later peaked at number 8. Outside the United States, the song became a top-30 hit in Germany and Lithuania. The album's second single, the Bryan Michael Cox-produced "Ride for You", was influenced by a fan poll. The music video for the song premiered on MTV's Total Request Live on December 5, 2006, the same day the band released the holiday song "Home for Christmas", which was written by Richard.

From February to May 2007, Danity Kane performed as an opening act along with The Pussycat Dolls on Christina Aguilera's Back to Basics Tour. Concurrently, the band worked on their second album, which was initially scheduled for a late 2007 release but was pushed back to 2008. In the summer of 2007, speculation concerning a disbandment circulated entertainment news outlets. The rumors were fueled by quotes taken out of context (most notably when Aubrey O'Day was questioned by TMZ about her relationship to the pop girl group the Pussycat Dolls) and by work the group members had done outside of Danity Kane. D. Woods's association with another girl group, The Girl's Club, was specifically cited as adding credibility to breakup rumors. Members of Danity Kane published personal online responses to the breakup speculation. On July 25, 2007, Danity Kane released an official statement on their group MySpace page stating that they were still together and working on their second album.

=== 2007–2009: Welcome to the Dollhouse, legal troubles and disbandment ===
While making several solo appearances on other artists' albums during fall 2007, Danity Kane was featured on the second season of the fourth iteration of Making the Band which debuted January 28, 2008, on MTV, where solo singer Donnie Klang, Day26, and the girls, lived and recorded their albums together. "Damaged", the band's poll-voted lead single from their second album Welcome to the Dollhouse, was officially released as a digital single on January 29, 2008, and became the band's second top ten hit on the Billboard Hot 100. Its music video was nominated for an MTV Video Music Award for "Best Pop Video" and "Best Dancing in a Video". Welcome to the Dollhouse, was eventually released on March 18, 2008, in the United States, where it debuted at number one on the Billboard 200, with first week sales of 236,000 copies. The album eventually received a gold certification from the RIAA in April 2008. By September 28, 2008, the album had sold a total of 546,790 copies. In a May 2008 interview with Kiwibox.com, Danity Kane revealed that the follow-up single to "Damaged" would be "Bad Girl". On the second-season finale of Making the Band 4, it was announced that Danity Kane would be headlining a tour in 2008 and be featured on the next season of Making the Band. The third season of Making the Band 4 premiered on MTV August 19, 2008. A week later, the girls were featured in an interview with Z100 at the Beatstock Dance Festival, where they stated they were planning to release another single after "Bad Girl".

After Making the Band 4 – The Tour and the release of the single "Damaged", Danity Kane once again encountered rumors of a breakup, largely spurred by scenes from the Making the Band series featuring their mentor Sean Combs sparring with O'Day. On the August 28, 2008, episode of Making the Band, Combs expressed his frustratation with the "oversexed" image he felt O'Day now showcased. O'Day was absent from promotional appearances with the group to appear as Amber Von Tussle on Broadway's Hairspray. On September 7, 2008, however, the group appeared together at the MTV Video Music Awards to help present the Best New Artist Award. Speculation of a break-up were also developing because of rumors that Richard would launch her own solo career with Bad Boy Records. Combs introduced Richard in a solo performance in early September. An Atlantic Records spokesperson responded, "The girls are still very much together. [...] They're promoting their album Welcome to the Dollhouse and working on their third." The group intended to open for Janet Jackson's Rock Witchu Tour, but had to withdraw due to label conflicts. Danity Kane planned to start pre-production for their third studio album, which would have begun in October 2008. In the meantime, Danity Kane released a line of denim jeans through Dollhouse. Under Russell Simmons Plastic Cash International, the decision was made to feature Danity Kane's image on Visa debit cards. The group had also been a part of an ad campaign for PETA. Collectively, as a group, there were plans for a fragrance, clothing and makeup line. Richard had developed a comic book based on the superhero that the group based its name on, which was intended for release sometime in 2009.

In Season 3, Episode 8 of Making the Band, Combs stated that Richard recorded three demos for his new album. On the same episode of the show, which was filmed on September 12, 2008, after continued debate with O'Day, he stated that O'Day was no longer in the group. The season finale, which took place Tuesday, October 14, 2008, confirmed the departure of both O'Day and Woods. Combs removed Woods due to feeling that she was unhappy with the group and that she had gotten "caught up in the wrath" of close friend O'Day. In the live section of the episode, Combs explained that the reason he let O'Day go was that she was not the same person he signed, that the fame had changed her. MTV News reported that Woods planned to work with another group, the Girls Club, and that O'Day was working on a solo album. In an October 15, 2008, interview with Us Weekly, Richard explained that O'Day's increasingly "sexy look" was alienating young fans. Referring specifically to O'Day's topless pictures for Complex magazine just a month before, Richard stated, "We had just did a signing with Dollhouse Teen, which is for 13, 14-year-old young girls... So we can't do that one day and then the next day do an obnoxious cover."

In a January 28, 2009, interview with MTV News, Richard announced that the group had split up. Richard explained that Combs had invited all the women to come back to the 2009 season of Making the Band and that only two of them, Richard and Fimbres, showed up. Combs later told Richard and Fimbres during a meeting that he released O'Day and Woods, along with Bex, from their contracts, and would be releasing Fimbres as well. He told Richard that she would remain on the label. O'Day conveyed her hope that fans continue to honor the group that "made her a star". O'Day said that though she is pursuing her own career as a solo artist, she would never turn down the chance to get onstage with her former bandmates. On April 30, 2009, a special titled "The Rise and Fall of Danity Kane" aired on MTV. The special was an in-depth story showcasing how the group came together and broke apart.

=== 2013–2014: Reunion, DK3, and second disbandment ===
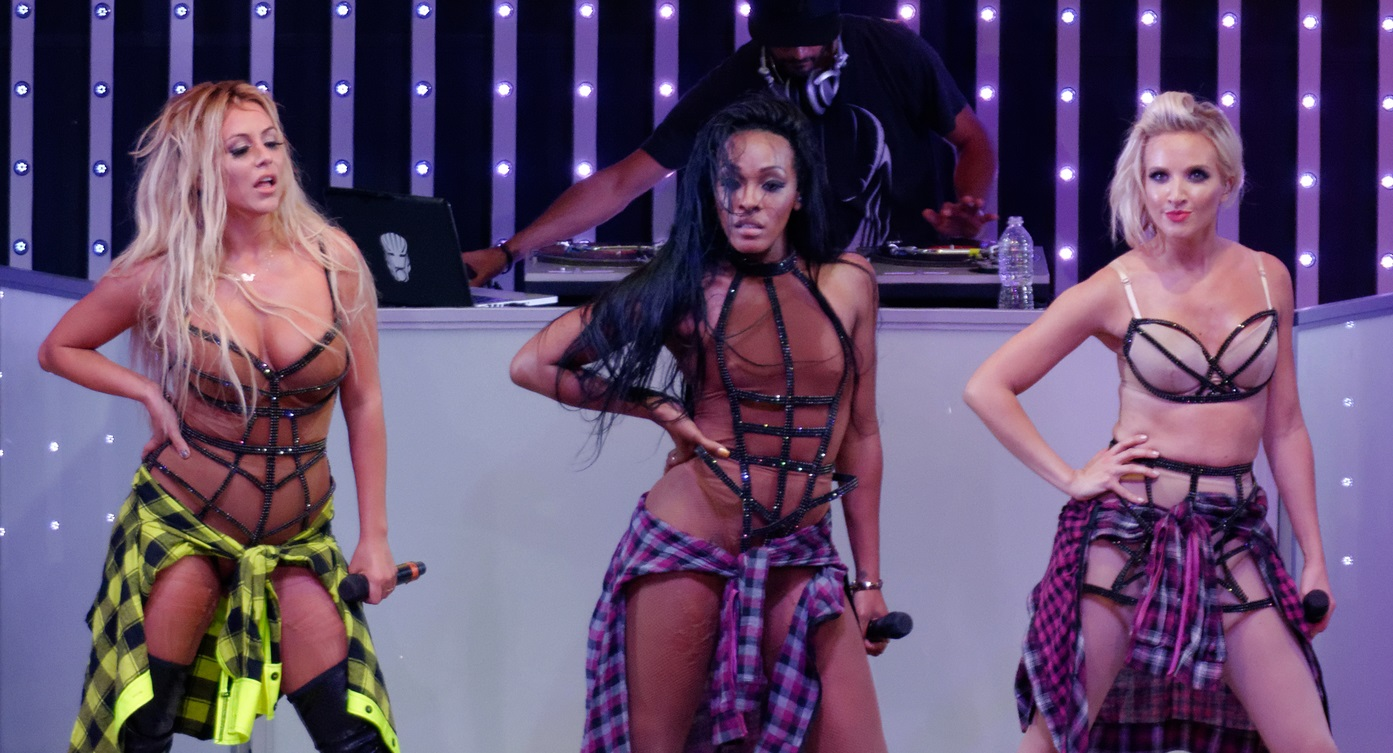
Danity Kane performing in Los Angeles as a trio in July 2014. (L-R) Aubrey O'Day, Dawn Richard and Shannon Bex.

In May 2013, O'Day, Bex, Richard and Fimbres began talks about a possible reunion and posted photos of the group in the recording studio. An announcement with regard to their reunion was made at the 2013 Video Music Awards on MTV. During the 2013 MTV VMAs pre-show, the four remaining members of Danity Kane announced that they were reuniting, returning on their own terms without Diddy. They announced that a single would be released soon titled "Rage", produced by The Stereotypes, the same producers who produced "Damaged". Original group member D. Woods did not take part in the reunion and she stated: "It has been brought to my attention that my former group members of Danity Kane will be reuniting and while I will not be a part of the reunion, I wish the ladies blessings and much success on their endeavors."

The band had their first performance in more than five years on September 21, 2013, at iHeartRadio Music Festival's Village in Las Vegas and performed an a cappella version of "Damaged". They confirmed in an interview that they were working with James Fauntleroy, Dem Jointz, Rodney "Darkchild" Jerkins, Timbaland, Da Internz, and The Stereotypes for the new album. They had their first reunion concert in December 2013. On March 15, 2014, Danity Kane performed their second concert since reuniting at Fort Cheyenne in Las Vegas, performing the new track "Bye Baby". On March 24, 2014, it was announced that the group would be hitting the road in May to begin their new tour entitled "No Filter".

On May 15, 2014, the band's first official reunion single, "Lemonade", was released on the Internet via SoundCloud. The single was produced by The Stereotypes, and features rapper Tyga over a production sampled from "Grindin'", the 2002 hit song by Clipse. On May 16, 2014, on the first night of their #NOFilter Tour at The Fillmore in San Francisco, after performing several songs with Danity Kane, Fimbres announced that she would be leaving the group at the end of their tour, and O'Day, Bex, and Richard would be continuing on as a trio. On May 28, 2014, "Lemonade" was released for purchase on iTunes, and on May 29, 2014, a lyric video for the song featuring three child impersonations of the trio was released to Vevo on YouTube.

On August 4, 2014, while in a Los Angeles recording studio, a fight ensued in which Richard allegedly punched O'Day. After days of speculation, O'Day and Bex released a public statement on August 8 announcing the group's second disbandment. On September 24, 2014, O'Day and Bex announced that despite the group's break-up, their third album, DK3, would be released on October 28, 2014. Following the group's break-up, Bex and O'Day began to release music under the name Dumblonde, while Richard continued to pursue her solo career.

=== 2018–2020: Second reunion and hiatus ===
In August 2018, O'Day, Bex and Richard announced The Universe Is Undefeated Tour, with O'Day and Richard stating that they had made amends. The set list for the tour would be split into three parts. The first part to focus on promoting the sophomore material from Bex and O'Day's duo, Dumblonde, followed by a second part showcasing Richard's solo efforts, while the finale part would include songs by the group. In January 2019 during their tour stop in Houston and a few weeks later on Instagram, O'Day announced that Danity Kane would work on new music. After touring for close to a year performing Danity Kane's, Dumblonde's and Richard's solo music, the trio released a new song under the Danity Kane moniker called "Neon Lights" on June 24, 2019. To promote the new single, Danity Kane had a two-day interactive event, entitled "Choose Your Own Adventure," where fans decided which songs they performed for the first half of the show.

In 2020, O'Day and Richard released an EP entitled Strawberry Milk containing two singles: "Fly" and "Boy Down" under the Danity Kane name. Although the tracks were released under Danity Kane, the EP was also promoted as Aubrey X Dawn. On Instagram Live, O'Day addressed Bex's absence from the group. She stated "Shan is building a company right now called Vooks." O'Day said, "Danity Kane is so much bigger than five girls. It can be one girl, it can be two, it can be five. It's a voice for women and you got two of us right now giving you that voice and who knows what the future will have ahead of us. Things can evolve, things move in different directions. Everyone is always invited back." On March 19, 2020, Danity Kane released their third single as the O'Day and Richard duo entitled, "New Kings". The group stopped posting to their official Instagram shortly after, signaling an indefinite hiatus.

=== 2025–present: Third reunion and The Untold Chapter Tour ===
On October 5, 2025, almost six years after their last Instagram post, Danity Kane would release nine tour dates for their "Untold Chapter Tour," with Jules Liesl as the opening act. The tour consisted of O'Day, D. Woods and Fimbres. This marked the return of D. Woods to the group for the first time since being fired by Diddy in 2008 as well as the return of Fimbres, who last performed with the group in 2014.

In early 2026, O'Day was in discussions to organize further USA shows, as well as a co-headlining tour with the newly reformed Pussycat Dolls. However, discussions fell apart due to financial concerns expressed by D. Woods & Fimbres. The two then decided to continue as a duo, performing over the Summer of 2026 at the LA Block Party. They will also open for Day26 in Washington D.C. in September 2026. O'Day and the official Danity Kane Instagram released statements to express disappointment at these appearances.

== Discography ==
Studio albums

- Danity Kane (2006)
- Welcome to the Dollhouse (2008)
- DK3 (2014)

== Tours ==
Headlining

- Jingle Ball Tour (2006)
- Making the Band 4 – The Tour (2008)
- #NoFilterTour (2014)
- The Universe Is Undefeated Tour (2018–19)
- The Untold Chapter Tour (2025-2026)

Supporting act

- Never Gone Tour (2005)
- The Monkey Business Tour (2006)
- Back to Basics Tour (2006–07)

=== #NoFilterTour (2014) ===
Date	City	Country	Venue
May 16	San Francisco	United States	The Fillmore
May 18	Anaheim	United States	The City National Grove of Anaheim
May 21	Chicago	United States	House of Blues
May 22	St. Louis	United States	The Pageant
May 23	Cincinnati	United States	Bogart’s
May 24	Detroit	United States	The Fillmore
May 25	Cleveland	United States	House of Blues
May 28	Charlotte	United States	The Fillmore
May 30	Boston	United States	House of Blues
May 31	Silver Spring	United States	The Fillmore
June 1	Philadelphia	United States	Theater of The Living Arts
June 3	New York City	United States	Irving Plaza
June 5	San Diego	United States	Humphrey’s by The Bay

== Awards and nominations ==
Year	Award	Category	Work	Result
2006	Urban Music Award	"Best Group – Female"	Danity Kane	Won
2007	Poptastic Awards	"Best Ringtone"	"Show Stopper"	Nominated
2007	Soul Train Music Award	"Best R&B/ Album Group, Band or Duo"	Danity Kane	Nominated
2008	BET Award	"Best Group"	Danity Kane	Nominated
2008	Teen Choice Award	"Best R&B Track"	"Damaged"	Nominated
2008	MTV Video Music Award	"Best Pop Video"	"Damaged"	Nominated
2008	MTV Video Music Award	"Best Dancing in a Video"	"Damaged"	Nominated
2008	Starshine Magazine	"Best Dance Song"	"Damaged"	Nominated
2008	Starshine Magazine	"Best R&B / Hip-Hop Song"	"Damaged"	Nominated
2008	Starshine Magazine	"Favorite Group / Band"	Danity Kane	Nominated
2008	Online Hip Hop Awards	"Breakout Girl Group Of The Year(R&B)"	Danity Kane	Won
2008	Online Hip Hop Awards	"Album of the Year (R&B)"	Welcome to the Dollhouse	Won
2008	Online Hip Hop Awards	"Off the Hook Award (R&B)"	"Damaged"	Won
2009	Guinness World Records	"First female group in Billboard history to debut their first two albums at the top of the charts."	Danity Kane	Won
2025	Billboard	"Top 100 Women Artists of the 21st Century" at #100	Danity Kane	Won
2025	Las Culturistas Culture Awards	"Best Way To Ride With Your B*tches"	"Show Stopper"	Nominated
2026	Billboard	"100 Best Songs Of 2006" at #69	"Show Stopper"	Won

Preceded by Da Band	Making the Band winners 2005	Succeeded by Day26; Donnie Klang
