= Shannon Bex =

American singer and television personality

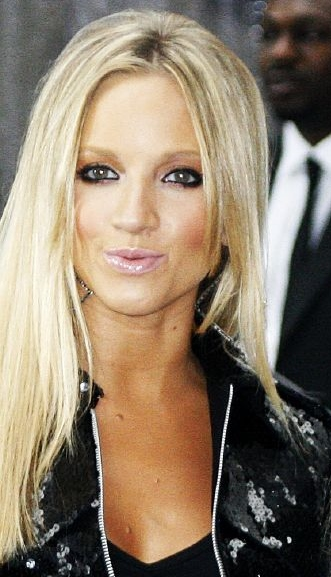
- Shannon in 2006

Background information
- Born: Shannon Rae Bex; March 22, 1980 (age 46)
- Origin: Bend, Oregon, U.S.
- Genres: Pop; electropop; country; R&B
- Occupations: Singer; dancer
- Years active: 2002–2019
- Label: Bad Boy (2005–2008)
- Formerly of: Dumblonde; Danity Kane
- Website: shannonbexofficial.com

Shannon Rae Bex is an American singer, dancer, and reality show personality. She was also a member of girl group Danity Kane and duo with Aubrey O'Day called Dumblonde

== Early life ==
Bex was born in Gresham, Oregon, to parents Pamela and Marshall. She has an older brother, Marshall Lee, who owned a video production company working with companies like Nike, Gatorade and Verizon. She started dancing at the age of six and began training in ballet. A year later, she danced in The Nutcracker under James Canfield for the Oregon Ballet Theatre. It was not until the age of twelve that Bex started to train in other styles of dance like lyrical, modern, hip hop and jazz. Her family moved to Bend, Oregon for her high school years, where she attended Mountain View High School. In school, Bex was involved in drama, dance team, and choir. At 19, Bex learned more about performing with a group when she was a Portland Trail Blazers cheerleader. At age 22, Bex joined a cover band, and this was her first paid musical engagement.

== Career ==
=== 2003–2009: Making The Band and debut with Danity Kane ===
Bex danced and sang for five seasons with the Portland Trail Blazers. She appeared on the 2003 series Fame, finishing as the runner-up to Harlemm Lee. During the finale, Johnny Wright said he would sign her. In 2005, she was featured as a potential "band" member on MTV's Making the Band 3, Season 2, before finally making the group. Danity Kane's debut album debuted at No. 1 on August 22, 2006, as did their second album Welcome to the Dollhouse on March 18, 2008. Shannon was also a member of the duo Dumblonde with fellow Danity Kane group member. Bex was the only married member of Danity Kane. Being the oldest member of the band, she was sometimes referred to as "the mother of the group".

In January 2009, bandmate Dawn Richard confirmed Danity Kane's demise. She stated that the remaining girls were all invited back to the Making the Band series and the group, but that only she and fellow band member Aundrea Fimbres showed up. Bex had already explicitly voiced her discontent about the dismissal of bandmates Aubrey O'Day and D. Woods from the group. Richard stated that she was not sure of Bex's reason for not returning. Bex was "officially" released from her Bad Boy recording contract by Bad Boy Records founder and president Sean "Diddy" Combs in the April 16, 2009, episode of Making the Band. During the April 23, 2009, finale of the series, Bex said that her not showing up for the 2009 season of the show was a "personal choice" and was nothing against the fans. In addition, she hinted at pursuing a country music solo career.

=== 2011–2019: Solo activities, solo career, group reunion and other endeavors ===
In March 2011, Shannon announced the formation of her new band, Bex, with several of the members of the pop-rock group Elliot. She showcased her band Bex at the Dance Track Magazine's 2011 Artist Awards gala, honoring dancers and choreographers for their work with major artists such as Beyoncé, Lady Gaga and Christina Aguilera, as well as with major films and small screen art. It drew a full house of talented artists to club "King King" in Hollywood, California, on March 27, 2011. As of April 2012, Shannon announced she was releasing a country solo album instead of an album as the group called Bex, which disbanded before releasing any music. Shannon's solo album was due for a 2012 release and being released independently.

In May 2012, Shannon started a fundraising campaign to raise money for her debut solo album, which she hopes to produce herself, independently. The funds contributed so far helped to bring Shannon's song, "I'm Out", to life. Shannon released her first solo single, "I'm Out", on May 14 on iTunes. She released her debut EP, via PledgeMusic on September 18, 2012.

In 2013, Danity Kane reunited consisting of members: Shannon Bex, Aubrey O'Day, Dawn Richard, and Aundrea Fimbres. In 2014, Aundrea Fimbres departed from the group, thus making Danity Kane continue as a trio. Danity Kane came to its second disbandment when member Dawn Richard punched Aubrey O'Day. Despite their disbandment, Danity Kane still released their third and final album, DK3, on October 27, 2014. Shannon Bex and ex- Danity Kane member, Aubrey O'Day, have come together and created a new alternative dance/pop duo under the name Dumblonde.

In 2019, Bex transitioned out of touring to pursue her role as co-founder and Chief Communications Officer at Vooks, a streaming platform bringing storybooks to life for children around the world.

== Discography ==
=== Albums ===
List of albums, with selected chart positions
Title	Album details	Peak chart positions		
Title	Album details	US	US R&B/HH	US R&B
Shannon Bex	Released: September 18, 2012; Label: PledgeMusic; Formats: digital download		77	

=== Singles ===
Year	Title	Peak chart positions		Album
Year	Title	US	US R&B	Album
2012	"I'm Out"	44	—	Shannon Bex
2012	"I'm a Woman"	—	—	Shannon Bex

== Music videos ==
Year	Title	Director
2012	"I'm Out"	Mode Adjust
