= D. Woods =

American singer (born 1983)

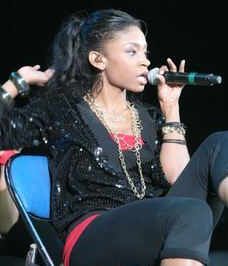
- D. Woods in 2006

Background information
- Also known as: D. Woods
- Born: Wanita Denise Woodgett; July 6, 1983 (age 43); Anaheim, California, U.S.
- Origin: Springfield, Massachusetts Atlanta, Georgia, U.S.
- Genres: Pop; hip hop; R&B
- Occupations: Singer, songwriter
- Years active: 2005–present
- Labels: Bad Boy Records (2005–2008), Woodgrane Entertainment (2009–present)
- Member of: Danity Kane
- Website: missdwoods.com

Wanita Denise Woodgett (born July 6, 1983), better known by her nickname D. Woods, is an American singer and songwriter. Woods is the founder and CEO of Woodgrane Entertainment but best known for her efforts on MTV's Making the Band 3 as a finalist on season two. She is also a member of pop girl group Danity Kane.

== Career ==
Before joining Danity Kane, Woods toured with several major recording artists such as Bow Wow, Lloyd, Avant, Snoop Dogg and Letoya Luckett as a background dancer, performed in theater festivals such as the National Black Theater Festival and Windybrow Festival in Johannesburg, South Africa off-Broadway theater productions, and interned with Spike Lee's 40 Acres and a Mule Production Company. She was hand-picked by director Chris Robinson to appear in the video "Change Clothes" by Jay-Z, where she was one of the models. D. Woods auditioned in 2005 on the second season of the MTV reality television program Making the Band 3 by Sean "Diddy" Combs. Danity Kane's first album debuted August 22, 2006, at No. 1. Danity Kane, along with the Pussycat Dolls, toured as the opening act for Christina Aguilera.

In December 2006, Woods was the lead girl in Lloyd's video "You". In 2007, she made an appearance in Gorilla Zoe's album Welcome to the Zoo, on the track "You Don't Know Me". That same year, she was also featured in the film Stomp the Yard. Her writing credits include multiple tracks on the platinum-selling Danity Kane album Welcome to the Dollhouse.

On September 12, 2008, Combs declared Woods no longer a member of Danity Kane, as well as bandmate and then-best friend Aubrey O'Day, following a heated discussion with Combs. MTV News gauged fan reactions to the dismissals of Woods and O'Day. Fans left impassioned, long and detailed comments on the MTV News site about their discontent at the group's breakup. They cited what they felt was a lack of individuality and excitement left within the group. New members were expected to be chosen for Danity Kane as "replacements" for Woods and O'Day, but the group broke up completely early 2009 when it was reported Woods and O'Day, along with group member Shannon Bex, declined the offer to return to the series and the group. O'Day stated that she was unsure if Woods was asked back, but that she herself was not asked to return. Although Woods was fired in 2008, she was "officially" released from her Bad Boy Records contract by Combs February 26, 2009 before the final episode of Making the Band the following April. Despite this, in the April 23, 2009, finale of the series, Combs stated that all five original members would be returning if he ever decided to reunite the group. Woods said she was going to release a full-length album later in the year, in addition to a single that will be released early summer 2009.

In an interview conducted after the finale show, Woods spoke with BE Entertained Magazine journalist Phonz L. Thomas. Woods was asked about an alleged rivalry between her and ex-Danity Kane member Dawn Richard. Woods replied, "I don't know if she has a problem with me per se [sic]. I don't know why she would have a problem. I was very disappointed by a lot of the things that she did say in the media and her different interviews. People are kind of aware of her comments and then also of course on the show, those comments were definitely going to get back to me. I was really disappointed and I don't know why she would go that route. And if it was to depict her as the victim and everybody else is the bad guy… I don't really know where all that stems from, but to me it's like she has her situation. And as you guys saw, I congratulated her as I was walking out the door! So it was like I don't have a problem and I don't know why she would have a problem… but she might, I'm not sure." Woods went on during this interview to comment, "I don't have any animosity towards any of the girls. Like things happen for a reason, it's time to move on you know, chapter ends. People are in each other's lives for a reason and a season, as they say! So there's no reason to hold any grudges. Um, however – the way that you present yourself, the actions you take, the comments that you make can lend themselves to having a 'beef' or having animosity."

Woods has had two photo spreads with King Magazine. She recorded songs for a possible solo album that can be heard via her MySpace, and appeared in Ludacris's music video "One More Drink". She appeared in Lil Wayne's new video "Prom Queen" and Young Money video "Every Girl". She also is working on film/television projects. She filmed a music video for her single "Legalize Me". It was later revealed that "On My Side" is the lead single with her filming the video in Los Angeles in June 2009. However, "Legalize Me" is released as a digital single, along with a music video, under Woods' own label Woodgrane Entertainment on iTunes. Woods was a featuring artist for Canadian rapper DY (Die Young) for his second single "That's My Spot", which a music video was filmed right before Dy disappeared in Mexico in early September 2010, and was confirmed as missing as of November 18, 2010. On November 20, 2010, Woods took to her Twitter account after learning about the disappearance of Schab: "I'm so hurt and worried learning about DY. This news effects me no matter how long I knew him. I'm praying for DY." She went on to say...,"Last time I saw DY we were joking on set of his video (That's My Spot). The director said it's a wrap and we said our 'see ya later' to each other."

In 2011, D. Woods was featured on Ray Garrison's single "Forever Gone", alongside Kyle Lucas. Later that year, she also released a "part 2" version of her song "Lady in the Street" on iTunes. The Gray Area EP that was supposed to come out in 2009 is now coming out on July 12, 2011, digitally on iTunes. In April 2012, D. Woods released a new single called "2 The Bottom". She also released the My Favorite Color EP, Volume 1 in December 2012.

in 2025, she spoke her experiences with Diddy who emotionally abused her and Aubrey O'day.

== Discography ==
=== Mixtapes ===
- Independence Day, Volume 1 (2009)
- Independence Day, Volume 2 (2010)
- Lady in the Street (2011)

=== EPs ===
- The Gray Area (2011)
- My Favorite Color (2012)
- Yasss (2024)

== Acting ==
=== Film ===
Year	Title	Role	Notes
2014	Blackbird	Leslie Crandall	Film nominated for the Black Reel Awards
2017	We Are Family	Broweena	Independent comedy film directed by Trey Haley
2022	Don't Be Desperate	Aliyah Stanbeck	Short film: Official selection, Detroit Black Film Festival

=== Television ===
Year	Title	Role	Notes
2005	Making the Band 3	Herself/Contestant	1/5 selected winner for group 'Danity Kane'
2007-2009	Making the Band 4	Herself/Celebrity	11 episodes (disbanded by P. Diddy, Woods independently exited after given ultimatum)
2015	Life Goes On	Robin Brown	Television movie
2015	For the Love of Ruth	Chloe	TV One original movie
2017	Star	Chantal	3 episodes
2020-2021	Stuck with You	Mora	UMC/ALLBLK original series, Daytime Emmy nominated (writing)
2022	A Mother's Love	Rae	2014 live musical stage production recording (re-released on BET+)
2023	Harlem	Karla	Guest appearance (season 2)
2023	Immortal City Records	Sapphire	Tubi original movie

=== Theater ===
Year	Title	Role	Notes
2013-2015	A Mother's Love	Rae	US Tour Musical production Produced by Kandi Burrus & Todd Tucker
2015	Jar the Floor	Venne	Off-Broadway (regional), Southwest Arts Center Theater, Atlanta
2016	ILLA: Hip-Hop Musical	Morgan, Ensemble cast	Cobbs County Center for Excellent in the Performing Arts, Atlanta
2017	Let's Make a Slave	Performer/Contemporary choreographer	production contributor for Emory University Theater
2017	Holler If Ya Hear Me	Corinne	Off-Broadway (regional), Southwest Arts Center Theater, Atlanta
2022	For Colored Girls	Lady in Yellow	Off-Broadway Revival nominated for 7 Tony Awards
2023	Black Odyssey	Nella P. Lincoln	Off-Broadway production, Classic Stage Company, NYC (Playwright, Marcus Gardley)

== See also ==
- Bad Boy Records
