= Dawn Richard discography =

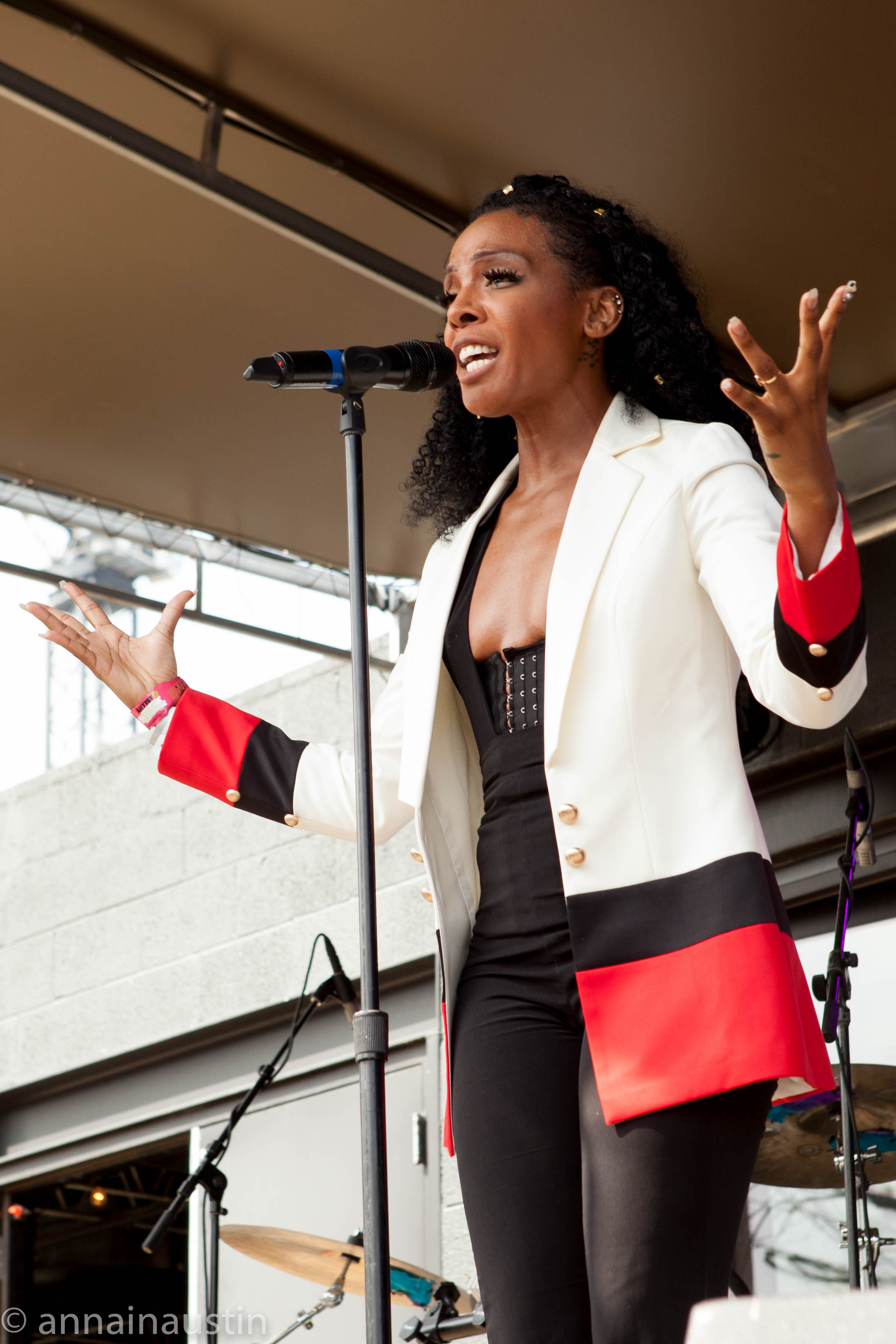
Richard in 2016

This is a discography for the American singer Dawn Richard.

== Albums ==
=== Studio albums ===
List of albums, with selected chart positions, sales figures and certifications
Title	Album details	Peak chart positions					Sales
Title	Album details	US	US R&B	US Dance	US Heat	US Indie	Sales
Been a While (as Dawn Angeliqué)	Released: October 18, 2005; Label: Yeah Brother! Records; Formats: CD, digital download	—	—	—	—	—	
Goldenheart	Released: January 15, 2013; Label: Our Dawn; Formats: CD, digital download	137	10	—	2	21	US: 9,000
Blackheart	Released: January 15, 2015; Label: Our Dawn; Format: Digital download, Vinyl	—	—	2	4	21	
Redemptionheart	Released: November 18, 2016; Re-released: March 10, 2017; Label: Our Dawn / Local Action; Format: Digital download, USB Necklace, CD, Vinyl	—	—	4	6	37	
New Breed	Released: January 25, 2019; Label: Our Dawn / Local Action; Format: Digital download, CD, Vinyl	—	—	—	—	—	
Second Line	Released: April 30, 2021; Label: Merge Records; Format: Digital download, CD, Vinyl	—	—	25	—	—	
Pigments (with Spencer Zahn)	Released: October 21, 2022; Label: Merge Records; Format: Digital download, CD, Vinyl	—	—	—	—	—	
Quiet in a World Full of Noise (with Spencer Zahn)	Released: October 4, 2024; Label: Merge Records; Format: Digital download, CD, Vinyl	—	—	—	—	—	
creole culture	Released: October 9, 2026; Label: Merge Records; Format: Digital download, CD, Vinyl						

=== Mixtapes ===
List of mixtapes
Title	Album details	Free downloads
The Prelude to A Tell Tale Heart	Released: April 21, 2011; Label: Our Dawn; Format: Digital download	1,000,000

== Extended plays ==
List of extended plays, with selected chart positions, sales figures and certifications
Title	Details	Peak chart positions					Sales
Title	Details	US	US R&B	US Heat	US Indie	US Elec.	Sales
Armor On	Released: March 25, 2012; Format: Digital download; Label: Our Dawn	145	28	4	25	—	US: 30,000
Whiteout	Released: December 1, 2012; Format: Digital download; Label: Our Dawn	—	—	—	—	—	
Infrared	Released: May 6, 2016; Format: Digital download, CD, vinyl; Label: Fade to Mind	—	—	—	—	12	
Psyflo | Risqué	Released: April 24, 2020; Format: Digital download; Label: InvadeAdvision	—	—	—	—	—	
The Architect	Released: October 18, 2023; Format: Digital download; Label: Merge Records	—	—	—	—	—	

== Singles ==
List of singles, with selected chart positions and certifications, showing year released and album name
Title	Year	Album
"December Sky"	2011	Whiteout
"SMFU (Save Me From You)"	2012	Armor On
"Bombs"	2012	Armor On
"Automatic"	2012	Armor On
"Pretty Wicked Things"	2012	Goldenheart
"'86"	2012	Goldenheart
"'Riot" (DJ Tomekk Remix)		Goldenheart
"'Meteors	2013	Non-album singles
"'Valkyrie" (Feat. Deonte)	2013	Non-album singles
"Judith"	2013	Non-album singles
"Levitate"	2014	Non-album singles
"Tide" (video single)	2015	Blackheart
"Blow"	2015	Blackheart
"'Choices: The Interlude" (video single)	2015	Blackheart
"Projection"	2015	Blackheart
"Calypso"	2015	Blackheart
"Projection"	2015	Blackheart
"Titans X James Dean"	2015	Blackheart
"Billie Jean"	2015	Blackheart
"Dance"	2015	Non-album singles
"Not Above That"	2016	Non-album singles
"Honest"	2016	Non-album singles
"Wake Up"	2016	Non-album singles
"Cali Sun"	2016	Non-album singles
"Renegades"	2016	Redemption
"Vines" (Feat. PJ Morton)	2017	Redemption
"LA" (Feat. Trombone Shorty)	2017	Redemption
"Lazarus/Love Under Lights"	2017	Redemption
"Stopwatch"	2017	Non-album singles
"Pynk"	2018	Non-album singles
"Jealousy"	2018	New Breed
"Maybe" (From "Kinky" Soundtrack)	2018	Non-album single
"New Breed"	2019	New Breed
"In My Feelings"	2019	Non-album singles
"Forget About Me | Visions"	2019	Non-album singles
"Spaces" (Remix)	2019	Non-album singles
"Ay Papi" (Feat. Brooke Candy)	2019	Non-album singles
"Slim Thicc" (Feat. Trakgirl)	2019	Non-album singles
"Die Without You"	2020	Non-album singles
"Buttah"	2020	Non-album singles
"F.U."	2020	Non-album singles
"Hold My Hand"	2020	Non-album singles
"RunLolaRun"	2020	Non-album singles
"Bussifame"	2021	Second Line
"Jacuzzi"	2021	Second Line
"Mornin | Streetlights"	2021	Second Line
"Boomerang"	2021	Second Line
"Loose Your Mind"	2021	Non-album single
"Bubblegum"	2023	The Architect

== Guest appearances ==
Title	Year	Other artist(s)	Album
"Already Know"	2010	Rotimi	—N/a
"Hate/Love"	2010	Guy Gerber	Hate/Love EP
"Free Fallin"	2010	Que Mosley	—N/a
"Fantasy"	2011	T-Pain	PrEVOLVEr
"TMS"	2011	Lil' Mo	P.S. I love Me
"Hate Love" (Kate Simko's Liquid Disco Remix)	2011	Guy Gerber	Heart Beats
"Marvin's Room" (Remix)	2011	Chris Brown, J. Valentine, Sevyn Streeter, Kevin McCall	Boy in Detention
"Where Were You"	2012	Drake	—N/a
"Keep Me From You"	2013	Eve	Lip Lock
"Di Di"	2014	Bo	—N/a
"Sober" (featured originally as D△WN)	2016	et aliae	Rose EP
"Hush"	2016	Paul Adey	—N/a
"Do It 4 U"	2016	Machinedrum	Human Energy
"We Could Be More"	2016	Star Slinger	We Could Be More EP
"Cool Your Heart"	2017	Dirty Projectors	Dirty Projectors
"Version of Me"	2018	Kimbra	Primal Heart
"Slow Down"	2021	AlanMichael	Saint Avenue
"sweetFACES"	2021	SADBOYMUSIC	planète des larmes
"Walk In"	2022	Gianni Lee	—
"Love You"	2022	Luuk Van Dijik	First Contact
"Slow Down" (SADBOYMUSIC Remix)	2023	AlanMichael	—
"Walk In" (Club Mix)	2023	Gianni Lee	—
"Deliver Me"	2023	Diddy, Busta Rhymes, Kalenna	The Love Album: Off the Grid
"Do Dat Baby"	2024	Cakes da killa	Blacksheep +
"Hold On"	2024	Kaytranada	Timeless
"Broken Hearted Sade"	2025	Joseph Shabason	—
"Psalm"	2025	KATALYST	Speakeasy
"Go Crazy"	2025	Pell	—
"Play"	2026	S. Fidelity	I Guess I'll Never Learn

== Songwriting credits ==
Year	Song	Artist(s)	Album
2009	"Perfectly Blind"	Day26	Forever in a Day
2010	"One More Drink"	Heidi Montag	Superficial
2013	"Fireflies"	Zendaya	Zendaya

== Music videos ==
Music video	Year	Director(s)
"#SMFU (Save Me From You)"	2012	Ev Salomon
"Bombs"	2012	Tallie L. Brinson
"Automatic"	2012	Michael Johnson
"Wild N Faith"	2012	ELY
"'86"	2013	ELY
"Riot / Northern Lights"	2013	Monty Marsh
"Blow"	2014	Monty Marsh
"Tide: The Paradox Effect"	2015	We Were Monkeys
"Choices: The Interlude"	2015	Jayson Carter
"Projection"	2015	Monty Marsh
"Calypso"	2015	kyttenjanae
"Titans x James Dean"	2015	Monty Marsh
"Billie Jean x Dance"	2015	Monty Marsh
"Wake Up"	2016	Monty Marsh
"Not Above That (VR Video)"	2016	Monty Marsh
"Not Above That (2D Video)"	2016	Monty Marsh
"Cali Sun (Animation Video)"	2016	DAWN
"Redemption (VR Experience)"	2016	SNAKE Productions
"LA"	2017	Monty Marsh
"Lazarus (Choreography Video)"	2017	Monty Marsh
"Renegades (A Fashion Story)"	2017	Randy D. Rosario
"Renegades (A Dance Story)"	2017	Q Burdette, Dawn Richard, Oththan Burnside
"Stopwatch"	2017	Mikhail Mehra
Jealousy	2018	Monty Marsh
Sauce	2018	Monty Marsh
Slim Thicc / Ay Papi	2019	Monty Marsh
Bussifame	2021	Dawn Richard
Pilot (A Lude)	2021	Zebretta Johnson
Jacuzzi	2021	Zebretta Johnson
FiveOhFour (A Lude)	2021	Zebretta Johnson
Boomerang	2021	Monty Marsh
VooDoo (Intermission)	2021	Buttercup
Mornin' | Streetlights	2021	Zebretta Johnson
Vantablack	2022	Dawn Richard
Saffron	2022	Dawn Richard
Crimson	2022	Dawn Richard
Bubblegum	2023	Dawn Richard
