= Josh Record =

- Born: Joshua Peter Record; 20 November 1987 (age 38); Stroud, Gloucestershire, England
- Genres: Acoustic rock, alternative rock
- Years active: 2012–present
- Labels: National Anthem, Virgin
- Website: joshrecord.com

Joshua Peter Record (born 20 November 1987) is an English singer-songwriter who has released one album, Pillars, and one EP. He has also had various success as a songwriter and producer for many artists including Avicii, Wyclef Jean, Sigala, Paloma Faith, Becky Hill, Tom Grennan, Dua Lipa, Tiesto, Merk & Kremont, Joe Jonas, DNCE, TWICE, Kaskade, Ella Henderson, Galantis, Felix Jaen, Anne Marie, Calum Scott, Alok, Armin Van Burren, Gorgon City, Wilkinson, Anyma, MNEK and LP.

== Early life ==
Josh Record was born in stroud, Gloucestershire, England, the son of a BFBS DJ, whom he cites as "my greatest influence". At the age of 16 he moved to London to study music at the BRIT School. He became involved in local charities on the Alton Estate teaching music and participating in related projects, working with young people involved in gangs. Subsequently, starting his own charity called The Root, helping communities in Kenya.

== Music career ==
His first release on indie label National Anthem in 2012 made it to number 2 in the Singer Songwriter charts on iTunes in the UK. The lead track "For Your Love" was heralded by everyone from Steve Lamacq to Zane Lowe to The Sunday Times who said "His keening falsetto invites comparisons to Bon Iver's Justin Vernon... Record has a sensational debut album in him".

His next self produced EP "The War" received critical acclaim and Zane Lowe made the title track his "Hottest Record of 2013" on BBC Radio 1, as well as live performances on BBC Radio 2, and BBC Radio 6 Music.

In 2013 Josh Record signed a deal with Virgin Records and in late November 2013 went on to release his EP "Bones", that has been play listed on BBC Radio 1. "Bones" EP also features remixes from Alt-J, Fryars, and FTSE. Bones was also the featured song to close the winter finale episode of the tenth season of Grey's Anatomy.

In March 2014, Josh Record re-released "For Your Love" on Virgin Records. Zane Lowe of BBC Radio 1 made it his "Hottest Record in The World" on 26 February 2014. The song was remixed by London Grammar.

Josh Record's debut album Pillars was released on 14 July 2014, receiving 5-star reviews from the Sunday Times and Daily Mail. This was followed by a sold-out headline tour in October.

He has written and produced for many artists and signed a publishing deal with Warner Chappell in 2017. He has been working with Sigala, Paloma Faith, Dua Lipa, Becky Hill, Tom Grennan, Tiësto, Merk & Kremont, Joe Jonas, DNCE, Anne Marie, Ella Henderson, MNEK, David Guetta, Calum Scott, Wilkinson, Mr. Probz, Steve Aoki, Don Diablo, Tim Hughes, Jones and Jorja Smith as well as many others.

In 2014 he co wrote and produced the Official UK Top 20 Single Yours, by Ella Henderson.

In 2016 he co wrote and produced LP's Muddy Waters that received international recognition after closing Season 4 of Orange Is The New Black.

In 2018 he co wrote the Top 10 UK single 'Lullaby' for Sigala and Paloma Faith.

In 2018 he co wrote and produced Merk & Kremont's track Hands Up featuring DNCE and the vocals of Joe Jonas.

== Discography ==
=== Albums ===
- 14 July 2014 - Pillars

=== EPs ===
- June 2013 - The War

=== Singles ===
- July 2013 - The War
- November 2013 - Bones
- January 2014 - Wonder
- March 2014 - For Your Love
- July 2014 - Wide Awake
- June 2017 - Do
- July 2021 - All of You
- August 2021 - Where the Wind Blows

=== Music videos published on YouTube & Vevo ===
- 2 July 2013 - The War
- 29 October 2013 - Bones
- 12 March 2014 - For Your Love
- 14 June 2014 - Wide Awake

=== Songwriting Credits ===
indicates a background vocal contribution.

indicates an un-credited vocal contribution.

Year	Artist	Album	Song	Co-written with
2014	Ella Henderson	Chapter One	"Yours"	Gabriella Henderson
2015	MNEK	Small Talk EP	"More Than a Miracle"	Uzoechi Emenike, Laura Dockrill, Hobbie Stuart, Ryan Cecil Campbell
2015	Anne-Marie	Karate EP	"Stole"	Anne-Marie Nicholson, Laura Dockrill
2015	Tim Hughes	Pocketful of Faith	"Hallelujah (Friend and King)"	Timothy Hughes, Jacob Atwooll
2015	LP	Lost on You	"Muddy Waters"	Laura Pergolizzi, Michael Francis Gonzalez
2016	Don Diablo	Non-album single	"What We Started" (with Steve Aoki and Lush & Simon featuring BullySongs)	Don Schipper, Steven Aoki, Alessandro "Lush" Miselli, Simone "Simon" Privitera, Jason Walker, Andrew Bullimore
2016	Jones	New Skin	"Hoops"	Cherie Jones-Mattis, Laura Dockrill
2016	Mans Zelmerlow	Chameleon	"Round Round" (featuring Nabiha)	Moh Debehi, Ellen Tollbom
2017	Dan Owen	Stay Awake with Me	"Made to Love You"	Daniel Owen
2017	Dan Owen	Open Hands and Enemies EP	"Home"	Daniel Owen, Jacob Atwooll
2017	Jones	Acoustic	"Becoming"	Cherie Jones-Mattis, Laura Dockrill
2017	Wilkinson	Hypnotic	"We Will Be" (featuring Matt Wills)	Mark Wilkinson, Adam Brown
2017	Matrix & Futurebound	Non-album single	"Light Us Up" (featuring Calum Scott)	Brendan Collins, Jamie Quinn, David Gibson, Edvard Forre Erfjord, Henrik Barman Michelsen
2018	Don Diablo	Future	"Everybody's Somebody" (featuring BullySongs)	Don Schipper, Andrew Bullimore
2018	Don Diablo	Future	"Found You" (featuring BullySongs)	Don Schipper, Thomas Troelsen, Joshua Wilkinson, Andrew Bullimore
2018	Sango	In the Comfort Of	"Comfortable" (featuring Ryan Ashley)	Sango, Ryan Cecil Campbell
2018	Merk & Kremont	Non-album single	"Hands Up" (featuring DNCE)	Federico Mercuri, Giordano Cremona, Simone "Simon" Privitera, Eugenio Maimone, Joseph Jonas, Andrew Bullimore, Emily Philips, Ant Whiting
2018	Icarus	In the Dark EP	"Flowers"	Ian Griffiths, Thomas Griffiths, George Adapoe, Ryan Hurley, Jack McManus, Andrew Bullimore
2018	MOTi	Non-album single	"Just Don't Know It Yet" (featuring BullySongs)	Timotheua Romme, OHYES, Bruce Fielder, Andrew Bullimore
2018	Wilkinson	Non-album single	"I Need" (featuring Hayla)	Mark Wilkinson, Andrew Bullimore, Eduardo "Rrotik" Nascimento, Jacob Atwooll
2018	LP	Heart to Mouth	"One Night in the Sun"	Laura Pergolizzi, Nathaniel Campany, Michael Francis Gonzalez
2018	Dawn Richard	New Breed	"New Breed"	Dawn Richard, Derek Bergheimer
2018	Sigala & Paloma Faith	Brighter Days / The Architect: Zeitgeist Edition	"Lullaby"	Jessica Glynne, Janée Bennett, Bruce Felder, Andrew Bullimore, Paloma Faith, Joakim Jarl
2018	Armin van Buuren	Balance	"Blah Blah Blah"	Andrew Bullimore, Armin Van Buuren
2019	Lvndscape	Hanging On EP	"Hanging On"	Galen Behr, Jack McManus, Andrew Bullimore
2019	Lvndscape	Hanging On EP	"Matterhorn"	Galen Behr, Jack McManus, Andrew Bullimore
2019	Lvndscape	Hanging On EP	"Cassiopeia"	Galen Behr, Jack Mcmanus, Andrew Bullimore
2019	Courage	Non-album single	"Let Me Let You Down"	Joseph Carson, Kaity Dunstall, Laura Dockrill
2019	Winnie Raeder	From Here	"Still"	Winnie Raeder, Jacob Attwool
2019	Felix Jaehn	Non-album single	"Love On Myself" (featuring Calum Scott)	Andrew Bullimore, Felix Jaehn, Tom Mann, Vincent Kottkamp
2019	Anna Of The North	Dream Girl	"Playing Games"	Anna Lotterud, Barney Lister
2019	Anna Of The North	Dream Girl	"Dream Girl"	Anna Lotterud, Barney Lister
2019	LUME	Edge Of My Seat EP	"Something Sweeter"	Zara Kershaw, Daniel Holloway
2019	Armin van Buuren	Balance	"Million Voices"	Andrew Bullimore, Alastair Lloyd-Webber, Armin van Buuren, Benno De Goeij
2019	Winnie Raeder	Non-album single	"She"	Winnie Raeder, Jacob Attwool
2019	Monsta X	All About Luv	"MISBEHAVE"	Andrew Bullimore, Derrick Milano, The Invisible Men
2019	Conor Maynard	Non-album single	"Hate How Much I Love You"	Andrew Bullimore, Conor Maynard, Jake Torrey, Noah Conrad
2019	Lily Moore	More Moore Mixtape	"Breakfast"	Lily Rendle-Moore
2020	ITZY	IT'z Me	"Nobody Like You"	Yubin, Andrew Bullimore, 이우민 ‘Collapsedone’
2020	Tiesto & Becky Hill	The London Sessions	"Nothing Really Matters"	Ollie Green, Karen Poole, Kye Gibbon, Matt Robson-Scott, Becky Hill, Ryan Ashley, Tijs Verwest
2020	Becky Hill	Only Honest on the Weekend	"Space"	David Whelan, Mark Ralph, Michael Di Scala, Becky Hill
2020	Tom Grennan	Evering Road	"Amen"	Wayne Hector, Tinashe Fazakerley, Lucian Nagy, Tom Grennan
2020	Paloma Faith	Infinite Things	"Last Night On Earth"	Paloma Faith, Patrick Wimberley
2020	TWICE	Eyes Wide Open	"Do What We Like"	Rod Radwagon, Grace Barker, Sana Minatazoki
2020	TWICE	Eyes Wide Open	"Behind The Mask"	Sam Klepmner, Dua Lipa, Jacob Attwooll, Jang Da-hye
2021	Enhypen	Non-album single	"10 months"	Josh Record, Tom Mann, Lostboy, Andrew Bullimore
2021	Armin van Buuren	Non-album single	"Should Be Loving You"	Josh Record, Andrew Bullimore
2021	Armin van Buuren	Non-album single	"Anita"	Josh Record, Andrew Bullimore
2021	YOU	Non-album single	"Find U"	Josh Record, Andrew Bullimore
2022	Galantis & Navos	Non-album single	"What It Feels Like"	Josh Record, Andrew Bullimore

== Live performance ==
Josh Record played throughout the summer of 2013 and 2014 at music festivals including Glastonbury Festival, Hard Rock Calling, Latitude Festival, and T in The Park Festival.

Josh Record has supported the likes of The 1975, London Grammar, Bastille, Lorde, Rodriguez, Michael Kiwanuka and touring across UK and Europe with Sam Smith in February 2014.
