= Believe Me =

Believe Me may refer to:

== Film and television ==
- Believe Me (film), a 2014 American comedy-drama film
- Believe Me: The Abduction of Lisa McVey, a 2018 Canadian-American crime film
- Believe Me, a 2026 British four-part true-crime television series

== Music ==
- Believe Me, an album by Deathray, 2005
- "Believe Me" (Fort Minor song), 2005
- Believe Me (Greczula song), 2025
- "Believe Me" (The Guess Who song), 1966
- "Believe Me" (Lil Wayne song), 2014
- "Believe Me" (Melody song), 2004
- "Believe Me" (Navos song)! 2021
- "Believe Me" (Usher song), 2014
- "Believe Me", a song by the Beastie Boys from Aglio e Olio, 1995
- "Believe Me", a song by Ellie Goulding from Bright Lights, 2010
- "Believe Me", a song by Rod Wave from SoulFly, 2021
- "Believe Me", a song by the Royal Teens, 1959
- "Believe Me", a song by Seabird from Rocks into Rivers, 2009
- "Believe Me", a song by Yulia Savicheva, representing Russia in the Eurovision Song Contest 2004
