= Colors (Ken Nordine album) =

Studio album by Ken Nordine
- Released: 1966
- Studio: Universal Studio A, Chicago, Illinois, United States
- Genre: Jazz
- Length: 53:47
- Label: Philips
- Producer: James C. Cunningham

Ken Nordine chronology
Presenting The Hammond Grand 100 Organ (1964)	Colors (1966)	Ken Nordine Does Robert Shure – Twink (1967)

Colors is a "word jazz" album by voice-over and recording artist Ken Nordine. The Fuller Paint Company commissioned ten songs for radio advertisements. Because listeners enjoyed the recordings and requested the radio play them again, the project expanded into an album of 34 songs. Each track personifies a different color or hue.

== Reception ==
A review from All About Jazz calls this release "brilliant" and states that "Nordine breathes baritoned life into hues that often pass our eyes but which can now color our ears as well". Editors at AllMusic rated this album 4.5 out of 5 stars, with critic Lindsay Planer writing that "there aren't many artists who could get away with creating an album of short eclectic odes to the various relatives and extended kinfolk of Roy G. Biv (aka the primary color continuum of red, orange, yellow, green, blue, indigo, and violet). But then again, there are few (if any) like word-jazz architect Ken Nordine."

The album was re-released in 1995 by Asphodel Records, bringing it renewed attention in Billboard, where it was highlighted as part of a trend of easy listening and vocal jazz albums coming out on compact disc. This re-release was chosen by CMJ New Music Monthly as Weird Record of the Month, with the review stating that "there's no other record like it".

== Track listing ==
All songs composed by Dick Campbell and Ken Nordine, except where noted.

1. "Olive" – 1:33
2. "Lavender" – 1:32
3. "Burgundy" – 1:31
4. "Yellow" (Campbell, Palle Mikkelborg, and Nordine) – 1:35
5. "Green" – 1:34
6. "Beige" (Campbell, Duke Ellington, and Nordine) – 1:34
7. "Maroon" – 1:39
8. "Ecru" – 1:40
9. "Chartreuse" – 1:33
10. "Turquoise" – 1:34
11. "White" – 1:41
12. "Flesh" – 1:33
13. "Azure" – 1:35
14. "Puce" – 1:34
15. "Magenta" – 1:34
16. "Orange" (Campbell, Nordine, and Nelson Riddle) – 1:29
17. "Purple" (Campbell, Billy May, and Nordine) – 1:35
18. "Muddy" – 1:35
19. "Russet" – 1:39
20. "Amber" – 1:37
21. "Blue" – 1:38
22. "Black" (Campbell, Ellington, and Nordine) – 1:39
23. "Gold" (Campbell, Ellington, and Andy Partridge) – 1:34
24. "Crimson" – 1:34
25. "Brown" – 1:35
26. "Rosey" – 1:36
27. "Hazel" – 1:37
28. "Mauve" – 1:34
29. "Fuschia" – 1:33
30. "Sepia" – 1:34
31. "Nutria" – 1:33
32. "Cerise" – 1:36
33. "Grey" – 1:40
34. "Coral" – 1:27

== Album details ==
The backside of the album describes a game that can be played while listening to the album.

The first 24 colors in the album have a playing tip associated with the color.

Olive	is overused
Lavender	needs delicate handling
Burgundy	moves slowly
Yellow	works well for paranoia
Green	is deceiving
Beige	demands caution
Maroon	makes it
Ecru	decisions take time
Chartreuse	you use freely
Turquoise	takes over
White	is a little off
Flesh	is complicated
Azure	is narcissistic
Puce	fills depressions
Magenta	makes marvelous nonsense
Orange	is good fun in streaks
Purple	doesn't mix easily
Muddy	is hope
Russet	always fits in
Amber	is for the middle
Blue	can change things
Black	is a family problem
Gold	can be holy
Crimson	gets out of control

== Personnel ==
- Ken Nordine – vocals, artwork
- Richard Campbell – flute, vibraphone, marimba, harpsichord, drums
- James C. Cunningham – engineering, production
- Dan Czubak – cover, design
- Bill Idol – liner notes

== See also ==
- List of 1960 albums
- Pigments, a 2022 album by Dawn Richard and Spencer Zahn
