= New Skin (Jones album) =

Studio album by JONES
- Released: 7 October 2016
- Recorded: 2015–16
- Genre: Alternative pop, soul, R&B, jazz
- Length: 42:00
- Label: 37 Adventures
- Producer: Honne; Rodaidh McDonald; Alex Davies; Raffertie; Josh Record; XO; Ollie Green; Tourist; Tom Skyrme; Digital Farm Animals; Josh Crocker; Oceaan

JONES chronology
Indulge EP (2015)	New Skin (2016)

Singles from New Skin
- 1. "Indulge" Released: 17 October 2015; 2. "Hoops" Released: 30 October 2015; 3. "Melt" Released: 14 June 2016; 4. "Wild" Released: 16 September 2016

New Skin is the debut studio album written and conducted by alternative pop singer and songwriter JONES. It was released on 7 October 2016 through 37 Adventures Records as the succeeding project to her debut extended play, entitled Indulge. The lead single from the album, entitled "Indulge", was released as a digital download on 17 April 2015 as her debut single. It was done so through her debut extended play which was released on the same day. The song gave her instant success on popular digital streaming platforms Spotify and SoundCloud and was considered as one of the biggest breakthrough internet successes. It was then released officially onto YouTube on 17 October 2015.

Not long after the release of the song, her second single "Hoops" was released days after on 30 October 2015. The song was her first ever song outside of her debut extended play and, therefore, sparked much interest about JONES conducting her debut studio album. After a few months into mid-2016, she released her third single "Melt". The album's first promotional single, entitled "Wild", was released on 16 September 2016 as a digital stream.

Upon release, the album was revealed to have been produced by big names, such as Rodaidh McDonald, Two Inch Punch and Tourist, who have been renowned for creating breakthrough hits for Sam Smith and Låpsley. It also gained recognition from big musicians and singers in the music industry, such as MNEK.

== Track listing ==
No.	Title	Writer(s)	Producer(s)	Length
1.	"Rainbow"	Cherie Jones-Mattis; Benjamin Francis Leftwich; Alexander James Davies	Davies	2:31
2.	"Indulge"	Jones-Mattis; Ollie Green	Raffertie	3:15
3.	"Hoops"	Jones-Mattis; Laura Dockrill; Joshua Peter Record	Record; XO	3:48
4.	"Melt"	Jones-Mattis; Andrew Clutterback; James Hatcher	Honne	3:34
5.	"Out of This World"	Jones-Mattis; Green	Green	3:30
6.	"Waterloo"	Jones-Mattis; William Phillips	Tourist; Tom Skyrme	3:49
7.	"Wild"	Jones-Mattis; Leftwich; Davies; Nicholas Gale	Digital Farm Animals	3:52
8.	"Walk My Way"	Jones-Mattis; Clutterbuck; Hatcher	Honne	3:48
9.	"Tomorrow Is New"	Jones-Mattis; Leftwich; Davies	Josh Crocker	2:48
10.	"Bring Me Down"	Jones-Mattis; Justin Parker	Rodaidh McDonald	3:41
11.	"Lonely Cry"	Jones-Mattis; Parker	McDonald	4:12
12.	"New Skin"	Jones-Mattis; Green	Oceaan	3:15
Total length:				42:00

== Charts ==
Chart (2016)	Peak position
Belgian Albums (Ultratop Wallonia)	189
