= Good Together =

Good Together may refer to:

== Music ==
- Good Together (A Certain Ratio album), a 1989 album
- Good Together (Lake Street Dive album), a 2024 album
- "Good Together" (song), a 2018 song by James Barker Band
- "Good Together", a song by Tom Aspaul from the EP Revelation
- "Good Together", a song by Honne from the album Warm on a Cold Night
- "Good Together", a song by Shy Martin
- "Good Together", a song by Scarlet Pleasure from the album Lagune
- "Good Together", a song by Kelvin Jones from the album Stop the Moment
