= Redemption (Dawn Richard album) =

Studio album by Dawn Richard
- Released: November 18, 2016
- Genres: Electronic, experimental, art pop, alternative dance, R&B
- Length: 47:24
- Label: Local Action / Our Dawn Entertainment
- Producers: Machinedrum & Noisecastle III

Dawn Richard chronology
Infrared (2016)	Redemption (2016)	New Breed (2019)

Singles from Redemption
- 1. "Renegades" Released: October 7, 2016; 2. "Vines" Released: November 4, 2016; 3. "LA" Released: April 4, 2017; 4. "Lazarus/Love Under Lights" Released: June 6, 2017

Redemption (Redemptionheart on physical editions) is the fourth studio album by American singer Dawn Richard, which was released on November 18, 2016, by Local Action / Our Dawn Entertainment.

Redemption serves as the final chapter in a trilogy, following 2013's Goldenheart and 2015's Blackheart. The album features contributions from Noisecastle III as well as New Orleans natives Trombone Shorty and PJ Morton.

== Background ==
I wanted to create a vibrant atmosphere. The Red Era is about moving on, redeeming yourself, and finding redemption.

— Dawn Richard

REDEMPTION is the final installment in a planned trilogy of albums by Richard, referred to as The Heart Trilogy, about love, loss, and redemption. The album is preceded by 2013's Goldenheart and 2015's Blackheart.

Richard describes the album as a "self-realization" album that is for all people. She says, "The Red Era is for everybody. Every gay, every fluid, every black, every white. Because my fan base has been through a lot of shit."

None of the previously released singles "Dance", "Not Above That", "Wake Up" and "Cali Sun" can be found on the final track-listing.

== Promotion ==
On March 12, 2016 D∆WN started her REDEMPTION Live show tour. In that same year, she was also chosen to perform the first ever YouTube live 360 performance.

== Critical reception ==
Professional ratings
Review scores
Source	Rating
AllMusic	4/5 stars
NME	4/5
Pitchfork	8.0/10
PressPlayOK	4/5
Pretty Much Amazing	B+
Tom Hull – on the Web	B+

Upon its release, Redemption received widespread acclaim from critics. Tara Joshi of The Quietus stated, "It's orchestral, it's odd, it's experimental, it's ornate, it makes you want to dance, it makes you want to swoon - at its heart Redemption is reflective of so many touchstones of black music from the past 30 years or so. It feels odd to say what Richard is doing is still perhaps too niche to get her a place in the R&B 'Hot 100', given her sound is so broad and all-encompassing, but its true. Richard has carved out an ambitiously futuristic place for herself that the mainstream hasn't quite caught up with yet."

=== Accolades ===
Publication	Accolade	Year	Rank
PopMatters	15 Best R&B/Soul Albums of 2016	2016	3
The Quietus	The 100 Best Albums of 2016	2016	9
Vulture	The 15 Best Albums of 2016	2016	14
Paste	The 50 Best Albums of 2016	2016	40
Pitchfork	The 20 Best Pop and R&B Albums of 2016	2016	*

== Track listing ==
No.	Title	Producer(s)	Length
1.	"Redemption (Intro)"	Dawn Richard, Machinedrum	1:27
2.	"Love Under Lights"	Machinedrum, Noisecastle III	4:21
3.	"Black Crimes"	Machinedrum, Noisecastle III	4:03
4.	"Voices"	Dawn Richard, Machinedrum	4:08
5.	"LA" (featuring Trombone Shorty)	Machinedrum, Noisecastle III, Kaveh Rastegar, Mike Iveson	5:44
6.	"Interim (Interlude)"	Dawn Richard, Derek Bergheimer	0:37
7.	"Renegades"	Dawn Richard, Machinedrum	3:30
8.	"Lazarus"	Dawn Richard, Machinedrum	3:35
9.	"Tyrants"	Dawn Richard, Machinedrum	2:56
10.	"Vines (Interlude)" (featuring PJ Morton)	Dawn Richard, PJ Morton	2:29
11.	"Hey Nikki"	Kaveh Rastegar	3:37
12.	"Sands"	Dawn Richard, Machinedrum	3:22
13.	"Lilies (Interlude)"	Dawn Richard, Machinedrum	2:36
14.	"The Louvre"	Dawn Richard, Noisecastle III, Kaveh Rastegar	4:12
15.	"Valhalla (Outro)"	Dawn Richard, Derek Bergheimer	0:42

== Release history ==
Region	Date	Label	Format
Various	November 18, 2016	Local Action / Our Dawn Entertainment	Digital download
