= Indulge (EP) =

EP by JONES
- Released: April 17, 2015
- Recorded: 2015
- Genre: Alternative pop, soul, R&B
- Length: 15:00
- Label: 37 Adventures
- Producer: Ollie Green; Brunelle; A. K. Paul

JONES chronology
Indulge (2015)	New Skin (2016)

Singles from Indulge
- 1. "Indulge" Released: October 17, 2015

Indulge is the debut extended play written and conducted by alternative pop singer and songwriter JONES. It was released on 17 April 2015 through 37 Adventures Records. The lead single and JONES' debut single "Indulge" was released on the day of the EPs release and was re-released officially on 17 October 2015. The song, along with the extended play, was the main project that sparked JONES' major breakthrough into the music industry. It even caught the attention of big music stars, such as Sam Smith, when he commented on the EP as being "f**king beautiful".

The extended play was produced by musicians Ollie Green, who previously worked with Alex Newell, and A. K. Paul, who frequently worked with NAO.

== Track listing ==
Indulge EP
No.	Title	Writer(s)	Producer(s)	Length
1.	"Indulge"	Cherie Jones; Ollie Green	Green	3:16
2.	"Deep"	Shane Tremlin; Thomas Foley; Jones	Brunelle	3:50
3.	"You"	Anup K Paul; Jones	A. K. Paul	4:28
4.	"Indulge" (Jam City Alt Mix)	Jones; Green	Green	3:43
