= Dick Campbell (singer-songwriter) =

American singer-songwriter

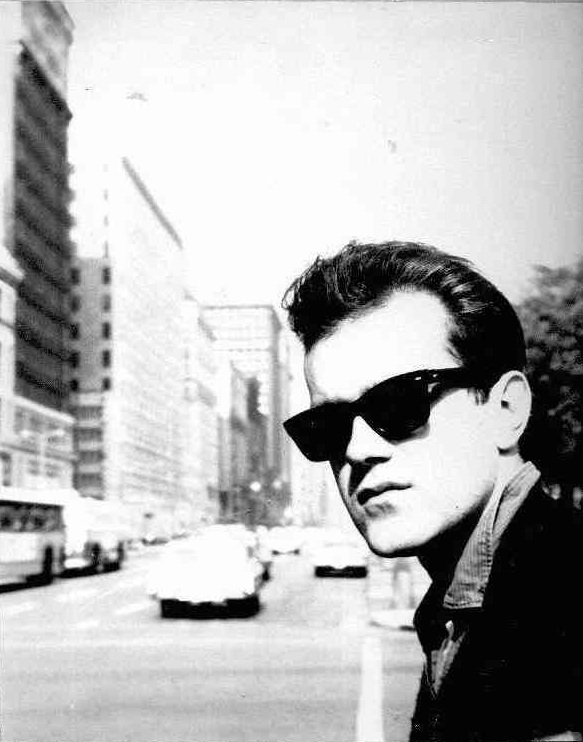
- Dick Campbell in Chicago, Illinois, in 1966

Background information
- Born: Richard S. Campbell; January 25, 1944
- Origin: Boston Massachusetts
- Died: April 25, 2002 (aged 58)
- Genres: Rock, folk rock
- Occupation: Singer-songwriter
- Instrument: Vocals
- Years active: 1964–2002
- Label: Mercury Records
- Website: Dick Campbell tribute page

Richard S. Campbell (January 25, 1944 – April 25, 2002), was a US folk rock singer-songwriter and film producer. He is best known for his 1966 album Dick Campbell Sings Where It's At, rated as "the sole masterpiece of the fake-Dylan field".

== Early career ==
Born in Boston Massachusetts and raised in Monroe, Wisconsin, Campbell was a relatively obscure singer-songwriter, who had released a couple of singles and composed for others including Artie Sullivan and all 34 tracks on Ken Nordine's album Colors. In 1965 he sent "a couple of Dylan-esque songs" to Mercury Records. Mercury was looking for an artist to compete with Bob Dylan who was signed to Columbia Records, so Mercury asked Campbell "to write ten more, come back in two weeks, and make an album."

Mercury teamed Campbell up with the then unknown producer Lou Reizner, who used Mike Bloomfield and the Paul Butterfield Blues Band, who had previously backed Bob Dylan, to ensure the style was very similar to Dylan's sound. Artists appearing on the album include Mike Bloomfield (guitar), Paul Butterfield (harmonica), Sam Lay (drums), Mark Naftalin (organ) and Peter Cetera (bass).

A single "Blues Peddlers"/"The People Planners" was released in 1965; with the album, entitled Dick Campbell Sings Where It's At, released in 1966. The album includes 12 tracks, all written by Campbell. As admitted in the sleeve notes, the album is heavily informed by his volatile relationship with his girlfriend, Sandi; with lines such as "I won't be capitulating / You're going to lose a few points in your ratings" and tracks including "You've Got to Be Kidding", "Approximately Four Minutes of Feeling Sorry for Dick Campbell", "Girls Named Misery" and "Ask Me If I Care".

The LP has been out of print for several years, and has yet to be released on compact disc in the US, although there has been a CD release in Japan.

== Critical reception ==
Although popular at the time, in retrospect, critical reception for Dick Campbell Sings Where It's At has not been great.

Richie Unterberger's AllMusic review gives it *** despite comments such as "Although this LP approximated the instrumental sound of Dylan's early rock records ... [Dylan's] was far superior." before finally conceding "As a curio of the early folk-rock era, though, this rare record definitely has its interest."

Conversely, Gene Sculatti's "Top 10 'Next Dylans'" described it as "the sole masterpiece of the fake-Dylan field", particularly rating "The People Planners (proudly waving their propaganda banners)" where:

"Mike Bloomfield, Paul Butterfield and support staff kick up an electrical storm as DC spits fire at the enemies of us all:

Hey there, don’t you scream
‘Cause I didn’t eat up all my ice cream
Or turn off the light when I came downstairs
Forgot to burn the rubbish or comb my hair
Just shut up!"

as being "worth any effort it takes to find. Never has thievery sounded so sweet."

== Later writings ==
Despite the success of Dick Campbell Sings Where It’s At Mercury Records dropped him, and his next album Demo Songs was released on Andrea Dawn in 1968. He continued writing and also recorded as 'Dick Campbell and the Scarlets', although the album was not released until 2009. One track, "Patty Girl", was extensively covered, and was used by Lou Reizner for another of his acts, Gary and the Hornets.

Dick Campbell wrote 398 songs as well as many poems, short stories, and screen plays.

Campbell became an A&R manager at RCA Records. Working with Gary Usher, he was involved with numerous artists, including unknown writer Jim Weatherly who wrote "Midnight Plane To Houston". Originally recorded by Cissy Houston, Gladys Knight and the Pips later changed the title to "Midnight Train To Georgia" and it became a major hit.

With Gary Usher, Campbell co-wrote "Good Ole Rock & Roll Song" which appears on the Cowsills' 1970 LP On My Side. The Cowsills also sang it on Dick Clark's American Bandstand. Campbell also co-wrote all 21 tracks on Usher's posthumously released 2001 album Beyond a Shadow of a Doubt.

== Later years ==
In the early 1970s Campbell started a film production business, producing films such as Glitter Goddess of the Sunset Strip starring Angela Bowie and Llana Lloyd. Campbell ran his film production business until the late 1980s when he retired for health reasons, having discovered he had Alpha-1 antitrypsin deficiency; an inherited genetic disorder, which leads to lung damage due to the lack of the protective protein, Alpha-1 antitrypsin.

Campbell lived in Los Angeles, California and later in Mission Viejo, California until 2000 when he moved to Wisconsin. In February 2002, he received a lung transplant, but due to complications, he did not recover consciousness and died on April 25, 2002. He was survived by his mother, three children, and 10 grandchildren and was buried in his family cemetery in Oakley, Wisconsin, about 10 miles north of the Illinois border.

A posthumous Dick Campbell CD called Blue Winds Only Know was released in 2003.

== Discography ==
- "Greatest Girl"/"Happy-Go-Lucky" – (1960) – Performer (With Roger Hesseling) and composer
- "Debbie Darling"/"She's My Girl" – (1962) – Performer & composer
- "It's Time"/"Suzanne" – Artie Sullivan (1963) – Composer
- "Blues Peddlers"/"The People Planners" – (1965) – Performer & composer
- Colors – Ken Nordine (1966) – Composer
- Dick Campbell Sings Where It's At – (1966) – Performer & composer
- Demo Songs – (1968) – Performer & composer
- "Goin' to Hollywood Tomorrow"/"Sugar River Blues" – (1969) – Performer & composer
- On My Side – The Cowsills (1971) – Composer
- Beyond a Shadow of Doubt – Gary Usher (2001) Performer & composer
- Blue Winds Only Know – (2003) – Performer & composer
- You're Getting Better: The Word Jazz Dot Masters – Ken Nordine (2007) – Performer & composer
