= Infrared (EP) =

- Cover to the standard edition; the 2017 re-release features similar photography of Richard in black body paint

EP by Dawn Richard
- Released: May 6, 2016
- Genre: Electronic music; rhythm and blues
- Length: 14:26
- Language: English
- Label: Fade to Mind
- Producer: Kingdom

Dawn Richard chronology
Blackheart (2015)	Infrared (2016)	Redemption (2016)

Singles from Infrared
- 1. "How I Get It" Released: May 6, 2016

Infrared is a 2016 extended play by American singer Dawn Richard.

== Reception ==
Kevin Lozano of Pitchfork Media rated this EP a 7.7 out of 10, concluding, "in the 14 minutes of Dawn’s brief blue period, she and Kingdom did what few can do—build a diorama for love’s life cycle, encompassing everything from death defying adoration and righteous anger to, best of all, forgiveness". In Resident Advisor, Andrew Ryce wrote that this album is "naked both musically and lyrically" showing the strength of Richard as a musician who does not need "to embellish her songwriting with production wizardry and experimental beats". TinyMixTapes's Birkut gave this work a 3.5 out of 5 for maintaining a "feeling of multifaceted and expressive response throughout".

== Track listing ==
1. "Honest" – 3:35
2. "How I Get It" – 3:31
3. "Paint It Blue" – 3:50
4. "Baptize" – 3:30

Bonus tracks from the deluxe edition

5. "Baptize (Kingdom's Honest VTX) – 4:18
6. "How I Get It (Helix Remix) – 3:50
7. "Paint It Blue (Rizzla Remix) – 4:01
8. "How I Get It (Leonce Remix) – 4:05
9. "Honest (Helix Remix) – 3:53
10. "Honest (Helix Remix) – 4:20
11. "How I Get It (Byrell The Great Remix) – 4:01
12. "Honest (Divoli S'vere Remix) – 3:56
13. "How I Get It (Divoli S'vere Remix) – 3:56
14. "Baptize (Leonce Remix) – 4:46

== See also ==
- List of 2016 albums
