= Whiteout (EP) =

EP by Dawn Richard
- Released: December 1, 2012
- Genres: Pop, R&B, soul, electronica
- Length: 18:47
- Label: Our Dawn
- Producer: Druski

Dawn Richard chronology
Armor On (2012)	Whiteout (2012)	Goldenheart (2013)

Whiteout is the second EP by American recording artist Dawn Richard. It was released on December 1, 2012.

== Track listing ==
No.	Title	Writer(s)	Producer(s)	Length
1.	"Whiteout"	Dawn Richard, Andrew Scott, Carla Carter	Druski	3:49
2.	"And the Bells"	Richard, Scott	Druski	4:04
3.	"Miles"	Richard, Scott, Carter	Druski	3:23
4.	"Wynter"	Richard, Scott, Carter	Druski	3:15
5.	"December Sky (EDM Remix)"	Richard, Scott	Druski	4:16
Total length:				18:47
