= Believe Me (Usher song) =

Song by Usher

from the album Flawed
- Genre: R&B; pop
- Length: 4:04
- Label: RCA
- Songwriters: Usher & unknown writer
- Producer: Mike Will Made It

"Believe Me" is a song recorded by American singer-songwriter Usher for his eighth studio album, Flawed. It was produced by Mike Will Made It, and released on September 5, 2014, through SoundCloud and the singer's VEVO channel. "Believe Me" is an "emotional" uptempo ballad, where the lyrics revolve around Usher betraying his lover's trust and being left with the guilt.

== Production and release ==
On August 24, 2014 Usher performed "She Came to Give It to You" during the 2014 MTV Video Music Awards, with rapper Nicki Minaj. The same day, "Believe Me" was released on MTV as a track from his eighth studio album Flawed (2016). It was later released through SoundCloud and the singer's VEVO channel on September 5.

"Believe Me" was produced by Mike Will Made It, and has a running duration of four minutes and four seconds. It is an "emotional" uptempo ballad, where Usher sings about "betraying his girl’s trust and being left with the guilt." The song combines the genres of EDM and pop, with R&B over-tones through Usher's falsetto. The song utilities synthesizers which "punctuates" and a "thumping" bass.

== Critical reception ==
Critics praised "Believe Me" for its production and Usher's vocal delivery. Billboard Music Awards described it as a "melancholic yet infectious" track that balances raw emotion with club-ready production. Complex noted that Mike Will Made It's beat gave the song a contemporary edge while allowing Usher's vocals to remain the focal point.

Some critics compared the track's themes to Usher's earlier confessional ballads like "Confessions Part II", noting its introspective lyrics and smooth delivery. However, others felt the song was overshadowed by the more commercially driven singles from Flawed and did not receive the promotional push it deserved.
