= Jones (singer) =

British-based singer and songwriter

- Birth name: Cherie Jones-Mattis
- Genres: Alternative pop, soul, R&B, jazz, indie
- Occupation(s): Singer, songwriter
- Years active: 2015–present
- Labels: 37 Adventures Records

Cherie Jones (also known by her stage name JONES) is a British-based alternative pop singer and songwriter. She came into the music scene in 2015, with her debut extended play, entitled Indulge, and was so called after her debut single of the same name. Her debut album, entitled New Skin, was released on 7 October 2016. She said in a recent interview that she recognises herself to be similar to musicians Lykke Li and Yukimi Nagano.

== Discography ==
=== Studio albums ===
Title	Album details
New Skin	Released: 7 October 2016; Label: 37 Adventures; Format: Vinyl, CD, LP, digital download

=== EPs ===
Title	Album details
Indulge	Released: 17 April 2015; Label: 37 Adventures; Format: digital download
Acoustic	Released: 17 February 2017; Label: 37 Adventures; Format: digital download
London	Released: 10 April 2018; Label: 37 Adventures; Format: digital download
New York	Released: 26 June 2018; Label: 37 Adventures; Format: digital download
Blue Sunshine	Released: 10 September 2021; Label: BMG Rights Management; Format: digital download
Magic in My Head	Released: 5 May 2023; Label: Jones; Format: digital download

=== Singles ===
==== As lead artist ====
- "Indulge" (2015)
- "Hoops" (2015)
- "Melt" (2016)
- "Indulge" (2016) (re-release)
- "Wild" (2016)
- "Whole" (2017)
- "Solid Gold" (2017) (with Tom Chaplin)
- "Simple" (2017) (with Joe Hertz)
- "Something Bout Our Love" (2017)
- "Tender" (2018)
- "Giving It Up" (2020)
- "Around" (2021) (featuring Nardeydey)

==== As featured artist ====
- "No Place Like Home" (2015) (Honne featuring Jones)
- "Solid Gold" (2016) (Tom Chaplin featuring Jones)
- "Shock Horror" (2017) (Shy Luv featuring Jones)
- "Handful of Gold" (2017) (Cazzette featuring Jones)
- "Apart" (2018) (Tourist featuring Jones)
- "Ain't a Bad Thing" (2018) (Claptone featuring Jones)
