= The Prelude to A Tell Tale Heart =

Mixtape by Dawn Richard
- Released: April 21, 2011
- Recorded: 2009–11
- Genres: R&B, pop, soul
- Language: English
- Label: Independent

Dawn Richard chronology
Been a While (2005)	The Prelude to A Tell Tale Heart (2011)	Armor On (2012)

Singles from The Prelude to A Tell Tale Heart
- 1. "December Sky" Released: June 24, 2011

The Prelude to A Tell Tale Heart is the first, full-length studio mixtape released by Dawn Richard.

Before the full studio album release Richard has released a few songs, one of them being "Me Myself & Y" which was released as a promotional single on globalgrind.com. Others are "These Tears", a heavy ballad with amazing vocals from Richard, and "Let Love In", another rock ballad with heavy vocal harmonies. She has also remixed a few of her earlier leaked songs, like "Trip City" and "Superhero", with "Trip City" being remixed into "Intro (The Fall)" and "Superhero" being put on the mixtape as an a cappella.

The album was released Monday, February 7, 2011 on her official website. There are 15 tracks. The album was titled "the prelude to..." because there was to be an official debut studio album by Dawn Richard entitled A Tell Tale Heart, which she had been working on for three years; however, it was later titled Goldenheart and released in 2013.

To promote the release of her mixtape, Richard organized several club events. On April 21, 2011 an event titled "Nightclub Mixtape Party Release" was held at PHX, and earlier on February 7, 2011 at the Milan club in Baltimore.

== Track listing ==
No.	Title	Producer(s)	Length
1.	"Intro (The Fall)"		2:23
2.	"Superman"		1:49
3.	"Biggest Fan"		3:36
4.	"Hey"	BLAQSMURPH	3:18
5.	"Me Myself & Y"	The B-Boyz	3:22
6.	"Broken Record"	AnonXmous	3:14
7.	"I Know" (featuring Kalenna)	AnonXmous	3:30
8.	"Let Love In"		3:18
9.	"I'm Just Saying"		3:59
10.	"Superhero (Acepella)"		3:04
11.	"Runway"	Honorable C.N.O.T.E	3:12
12.	"These Tears"	Phillip Bryant	4:48
13.	"Vibrate"	Da Internz	2:12
14.	"Champion"		1:58
15.	"Bulletproof"	AnonXmous	4:06
16.	"December Sky" (Bonus Track)	Andrew "Druski" Scott	4:00
