= Pigments (album) =

Studio album by Dawn Richard and Spencer Zahn
- Released: October 21, 2022
- Genre: Avant-garde
- Length: 36:10
- Language: English
- Label: Merge
- Producer: Spencer Zahn

Dawn Richard chronology
Pigments (2022)	Quiet in a World Full of Noise (2024)

Dawn Richard chronology
Second Line (2021)	Pigments (2023)	The Architect (2023)

Spencer Zahn chronology
Sunday Painter (2020)	Pigments (2022)	Statues I (2023)

Pigments is a collaborative studio album by experimental musicians Dawn Richard and Spencer Zahn, released by Merge Records on October 21, 2022. The album has received positive reviews from critics, writing that it has pushed Richard into new musical territory and that the composition successfully blends multiple musical genres and styles.

== Recording and release ==
I wanted my voice to be moss surrounding the roots of Spencer's compositions, never forcing the moment to fill every space but rather reveling in the openness of thought and breath.

—Richard on collaborating with Zahn

Dawn Richard and Spencer Zahn first met touring with Kimbra and collaborated on the Zahn's "Cyanotype" from People of the Dawn in 2018, leading to recording this album-length composition named after colors. The music was inspired by New Orleans and was built around Richard adding vocals to Zahn's songs, with lyrics about catharsis and healing. The songs are experimental music and a third stream blend of electronic music genres like ambient along with art music styles of jazz and Western classical, written from the perspective of a young black girl who is painting scenes of the future. The album was previewed with four tracks that make up movement one on August 30, 2022.

The music was adapted to a live show in 2024.

== Reception ==
Professional ratings
Aggregate scores
Source	Rating
Metacritic	87/100 (5 reviews)
Review scores
Source	Rating
AllMusic	4/5 stars
Clash Music	8/10
Financial Times	4/5 stars
Pitchfork	8.3/10
Uncut	9/10

Pigments received positive reviews from critics noted at review aggregator Metacritic. It has a weighted average score of 87 out of 100, based on five reviews.

Editors at AllMusic rated this album 4 out of 5 stars, with critic Andy Kellman writing that "it's as moving as any of Richard's previous output" and "no other album is quite like it". Online music retailer Bandcamp chose this as Album of the Day, with Ted Davis praising the instrumentation but also writing that the "most gripping elements come from Richard's vocals". Writing for Clash Music, Ana Lamond rated Pigments 8 out of 10, summing up, "From start to finish, Dawn Richard and Spencer Zahn have created a truly refreshing body of work, a seamless experience. 'Pigments' encourages one to reach outside of their comfort zone, to listen more closely, more openly." This release was shortlisted in The Fader for being "exciting and natural". In The Financial Times, Ludovic Hunter-Tilney gave this release 4 out of 5 stars, characterizing the collaboration as a "rewarding act of synthesis". NPR's Tarisai Ngangura calls this music "a flip side to day-dreaming" and "a dynamic collaboration intersecting both artists' discographies".

Editors at Pitchfork chose this as Best New Music, with critic Sam Goldner rating it an 8.3 out of 10, writing that the two musicians complement and challenge one another: "where Zahn's instrumentals are often measured and gentle, Richard's performance is dynamic, regularly growing from a soft quiver to a mighty, all-encompassing wail and back again... the two musicians push each other into an atmospheric zone that's new for both". In Relix, Richard Gehr called this work "an immersive experiment in what used to be called "third stream" (neither quite jazz nor classical) music". Editors at Stereogum chose this to be Album of the Week and Chris DeVille writing that this music will "radically revise listeners' understanding of Dawn Richard and her art". In Uncut, John Lewis rated this album 9 out of 10, calling the music "a blissful spiritual balm".

== Track listing ==
All lyrics written by Dawn Richard, all music written by Spencer Zahn.

1. "Coral" – 3:10
2. "Sandstone" – 3:36
3. "Indigo" – 2:05
4. "Vantablack" – 3:55
5. "Sienna" – 4:52
6. "Cerulean" – 3:32
7. "Opal" – 1:35
8. "Saffron" – 3:53
9. "Crimson" – 3:36
10. "Cobalt" – 1:25
11. "Umber" – 4:31

== Personnel ==
- Dawn Richard – vocals
- Spencer Zahn – upright bass, fretless bass, piano, vibraphone, synthesizer, arrangement, production

Additional musicians

- Stuart Bogie – clarinet, bass clarinet
- Mike Haldeman – electric guitar, acoustic guitar, sampled electronic instruments
- Malcolm Parson – cello, violin, viola
- Dawn Richard – vocals
- Dave Scalia – drums
- Kirk Schoenherr – electric guitar
- Jas Walton – tenor saxophone, flute
- Doug Wieselman – clarinet, bass clarinet

Technical personnel

- Jake Aron – vocal engineering
- Eli Crews – mixing
- Shawn Hatfield – mastering
- Alex Komlos – vocal engineering
- Monty Marsh – cover photography
- Clifford Usher – inside photography
- Lily Wen – clarinet engineering

== See also ==
- Colors, a 1966 Ken Nordine album
- 2022 in American music
- Lists of 2022 albums
