= New Breed (Dawn Richard album) =

Studio album by Dawn Richard
- Released: January 25, 2019
- Genre: Alternative R&B
- Length: 32:28
- Label: Local Action
- Producer: Dawn Richard; Derek Bergheimer; Young & Sick; Kaveh Rastegar; Cole M.G.N.; Hudson Mohawke; PRGRSHN

Dawn Richard chronology
Redemption (2016)	New Breed (2019)	Second Line (2021)

Singles from New Breed
- 1. "Jealousy" Released: September 3, 2018; 2. "New Breed" Released: November 7, 2018

Professional ratings
Aggregate scores
Source	Rating
AnyDecentMusic?	7.7/10
Metacritic	81/100
Review scores
Source	Rating
AllMusic	4/5 stars
Exclaim!	8/10
Pitchfork	7/10
PopMatters	8/10

New Breed (stylized in all lowercase) is the fifth studio album by American singer-songwriter Dawn Richard. It was released on January 25, 2019 through Local Action Records.

== Track listing ==
Credits adapted from Bandcamp.

All tracks are written by Dawn Richard, except where noted.

No.	Title	Writer(s)	Producer(s)	Length
1.	"The Nine (Intro)"	Dawn Richard; Josh Record	Dawn Richard; Derek Bergheimer	1:24
2.	"New Breed"		Richard; Bergheimer	3:34
3.	"Spaces"		Richard; Bergheimer	3:09
4.	"Dreams and Converse"		Richard; Bergheimer; Young & Sick	3:17
5.	"Shades"		Richard; Bergheimer; Kaveh Rastegar	3:41
6.	"Jealousy"		Cole M.G.N.	3:40
7.	"Sauce"		Cole M.G.N.; Hudson Mohawke	3:20
8.	"Vultures / Wolves"		Richard; Bergheimer	5:42
9.	"We, Diamonds"	Richard; Jin Jin	PRGRSHN	3:27
10.	"Ketchup and Po'boys (Outro)"		Richard; Bergheimer	1:14
Total length:				32:28

- All track titles are stylized in all lowercase.
