= The Architect (EP) =

EP by Dawn Richard
- Released: October 18, 2023
- Genre: Experimental pop
- Length: 14:02
- Language: English
- Label: Merge
- Producer: Bubbs; Taylor Dexter; The Idiot; Gina Jeanz; Andy McCauley; Connor McElwain; Wesley Singerman

Dawn Richard chronology
| Pigments (2022) | The Architect (2023) |

Singles from The Architect
- 1. "Bubblegum" Released: April 12, 2023; 2. "Babe Ruth" Released: October 18, 2023

The Architect is a 2023 extended play by American experimental pop musician Dawn Richard.

== Reception ==
The Architect was preceded by the single "Bubblegum" in April 2023, when Robin Murray of Clash Music called it "a zesty slice of electronic-saturated R&B bedlam that evades standard genre descriptors". Editors at Stereogum chose it as the best song of the week, with critic Tom Breihan calling it "a hard-slamming booty-shake anthem" that sounds like Richard's previous group Danity Kane. It was also listed among the 22 best songs of the past two weeks by Mark Redfern of Under the Radar.

This EP was shortlisted by BrooklynVegan among the best songs of the week. Shahzaib Hussain of Clash Music called this release "a dose of exquisite experimental-pop alchemy". In Rolling Stone, Charisma Madarang praised "Babe Ruth"'s music video for its color and choreography and called the song "hard-hitting". Mark Redfern of Under the Radar included "Babe Ruth" among the 12 best songs of the week. Grant Sharples of Uproxx also included this among the best new indie music of the week, calling "further evidence of Richard’s undeniable artistic prowess".

Jon Pareles of The New York Times chose "Babe Ruth" as one of the best songs of the week, characterizing it as "a blurry, glitchy intro [that] segues into an electro thump, a house bounce and a jazz-rock guitar solo that ends as if awaiting another metamorphosis".

At Stereogum, James Rettig included this among the best EPs of 2023. Editors at Spin chose this as the second best EP of 2023.

== Track listing ==
All lyrics written by Dawn Richard.

1. "Your Love / Legends" (Taylor Dexter, Connor McElwain, Richard, and Wesley Singerman) – 6:41
2. "Bubblegum" (Dexter, Andy McCauley, Richard, Gabe Steiner, and Singerman) – 2:43
3. "Babe Ruth" (Dexter, Gina Jeanz, Richard, Singerman, and Kieran Watters) – 4:38

== Personnel ==
- Dawn Richard – instrumentation, vocals
- Chris Athens – mastering
- Bubbs – production on "Bubblegum"
- Taylor Dexter – production
- The Idiot – production on "Babe Ruth"
- Gina Jeanz – production on "Babe Ruth"
- Alex Komlos – mixing
- Andy McCauley – production on "Bubblegum"
- Connor McElwain – production on "Your Love / Legends"
- Wesley Singerman – production

== See also ==
- 2023 in American music
- List of 2023 albums
