= Goldenheart =

Studio album by Dawn Richard
- Released: January 15, 2013
- Genres: Alternative R&B; contemporary R&B; pop
- Length: 62:35
- Label: Our Dawn
- Producers: Andrew "Druski" Scott; Deonte; The Fisticuffs

Dawn Richard chronology
Whiteout (2012)	Goldenheart (2013)	Blackheart (2015)

Singles from Goldenheart
- 1. "'86" Released: January 15, 2013; 2. "Northern Lights" Released: April 8, 2013

Goldenheart is the second studio album by American singer and songwriter Dawn Richard. It was released on January 15, 2013, by Our Dawn Entertainment. After her group Diddy – Dirty Money disbanded in 2012, Richard continued to develop her musical identity and worked with creative partner and manager Andrew "Druski" Scott, who co-wrote Goldenheart with her. It is the first in a trilogy of albums by Richard about love, loss, and redemption.

Goldenheart is an eccentric R&B album that draws on dream pop, alternative, and dance genres. Its mostly midtempo songs have strong grooves and feature synthesizers, string settings, vintage keyboards, and an array of percussive sounds. A post-breakup concept album, Richard's songwriting poses relationships and personal subjects as epic tales through magical, medieval imagery and allusions to high fantasy and science fiction tropes.

The album was released independently by Richard and promoted with the lead single "'86". It debuted at number 137 on the Billboard 200 chart and sold 3,000 copies in its first week. Upon its release, Goldenheart received universal acclaim from music critics, who praised its grand musical scope and Richard's theatrical personality.

== Background ==
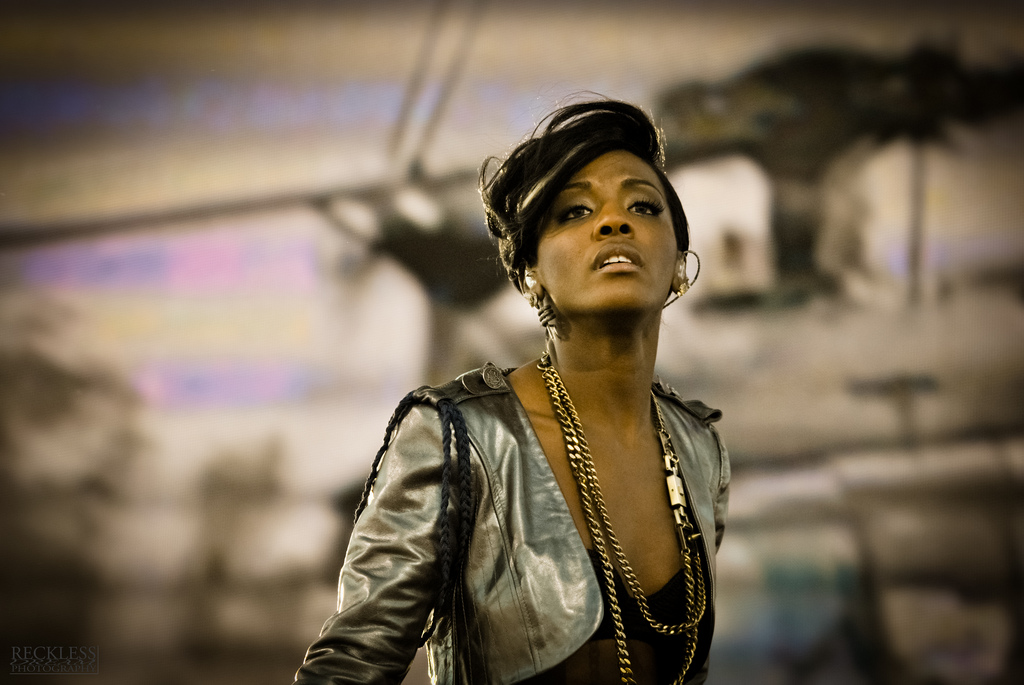
Richard in 2010

During stints in different musical groups, Dawn Richard wanted to develop her musical identity and pursue a solo recording career. In 2011, Richard was promoting the album Last Train to Paris (2010) as a member of Sean Combs' musical project Diddy – Dirty Money and released a free mixtape, The Prelude to A Tell Tale Heart, which registered one million downloads within a month. After the group disbanded in 2012, she worked with producer, manager, and creative partner Andrew "Druski" Scott and released her EP Armor On, which sold 30,000 copies. Richard also marketed herself through social media and self-funded music videos on YouTube.

Goldenheart is the first release in a trilogy of albums by Richard about love, loss, and redemption, followed by Blackheart (2015) and Redemption (2016). She wrote songs for the albums over the course of six years. Some were written as ten-minute songs and instrumentals, but Richard edited them down to avoid being "long-winded" and "overwhelming".

== Music ==
"Gleaux"
The song's electronic beat exhibits several shifts in key and time signature. Its slightly staggered handclaps typify the music's rhythmic, second line influence.

Goldenheart has an eccentric, dreamy musical style that incorporates spare, reverberating beats, icy synthesizers, and dream pop textures. Allmusic's Andy Kellman characterizes its music as "largely pop-oriented contemporary R&B", while Jesse Cataldo from Slant Magazine finds it to be "aligned with an intensifying style of alternative R&B ... in which albums are intricately structured and thematic." Marcus Holmlund of Interview observes an "atmospheric aesthetic" that blends "alternative listens like Björk and Imogen Heap with 80s pop (à la Phil Collins and Prince)". Richard, who grew up listening to Collins, Prince, Genesis, Cyndi Lauper, and Peter Gabriel, cites the song "'86" as most exemplary of those influences on the album. Goldenheart also draws heavily on dance music. Its melodic urban contemporary sound incorporates elements of electro, house, and European dance-pop. The ambient, 2-step "In Your Eyes" and "Riot" both have euphoric house climaxes. "Pretty Wicked Things" features an industrialized, dubstep production, with jerky basslines and pitch-shifted vocals.

Andrew "Druski" Scott's production on Goldenheart incorporates synth pads, string settings, vintage keyboards, and varied beats. Music writers compare Scott's partnership with Richard on the album to producer Brian Eno's work with David Bowie during the latter's "Berlin" period; Jonathan Bogart of The Atlantic writes that Scott serves a similar role by "creating dense soundscapes for [Richard's] often electronically altered voice to glide over, wash through, soar in, and pierce with sudden emotion." The maximalist production of the opening song "In the Hearts Tonight" begins with 45 seconds of both staccato and tremolo strings, solo flute, and a ringing harpsichord line that coalesce with various self-harmonising voices. The album's closing title track, a meditation on nostalgia built around Claude Debussy's "Clair de Lune", is solely performed with electronically altered voice and piano. Richard's singing veers from restraint to expressions of yearning, with a quavering timbre. "Return of the Queen" posits Richard's virtuosic vocal undulations against trip hop and operatic flourishes.

The songs are mostly midtempo, have strong grooves, and occasionally emphasize drums, with various percussive sounds that include bass drums, handclaps, and timpanis. Beginning with an eerie music box loop, "Northern Lights" builds gradually over a drum machine beat and layered, stereo-panning handclaps. The handclaps and drum loop that are buried in the mix of "Gleaux" yield an urgent half-time tremor and obscure chamber strings. The drumming on Goldenheart has a tribal, African-influenced sound, which Richard attributes to the music of her native New Orleans: "It's that marching band, second-line music, that Creole-influence in the kick, and the snare that drives everything for me." The album is bookended by stately marches in "Return of a Queen" and "[300]". "In Your Eyes" was inspired by the Peter Gabriel song of the same name, which Richard felt had a calypso and South African vibe. Steven Hyden observes several "hallmarks of '70s prog and '80s soft rock" other than the influence of Gabriel's "art-school deconstructions of classic '60s soul", including Goldenheart's Roxy Music-esque album cover.

=== Lyrics ===
Goldenheart is like a modern-day Joan of Arc. Think of it like medieval times-cum-2045 or Lancelot and Guinevere in 3025. It's a new version of these battles—age-old stories for the now. They're stories that have always been relatable.

— Dawn Richard, Interview

Goldenheart is a post-breakup concept album that explores themes of imagination and dreams. In discussing trials of relationships, it portrays personal subjects as epic tales of battle and salvation. Gerrick D. Kennedy of the Los Angeles Times writes that its stories of romantic and professional heartbreak are "tightly intertwined through Richard's imagery". Her lyrics employ religious imagery, battle motifs, and allusions to high fantasy and science fiction tropes, including heroic last stands, world-dominating empires, parted oceans, starflights, vampiric lovers, and military deployment, all used as metaphors for internal landscape and personal conflict. "Northern Lights" and "Frequency" feature space travel and cybernetic imagery, respectively, with the latter song featuring bandwidth references such as "your signal's found a home" and "stimulation makes it flow". Jesse Cataldo from Slant Magazine observes "a kind of feverish mysticism" on the album, which he views is "concerned with magical imagery and the self-restorative properties of the human heart." "'86" is titled after the slang term and is about ridding oneself of barriers.

Richard views the album as her take on medieval literature, but calls her lyrics less "literal" than contemporary pop music. Lyrically, she portrays herself as an embattled queen in acts of guarding, fighting, surrendering, and conquering. She murmurs in the intro to "Warfaire", "I fight a battle every day, against discouragement and fear ... I must forever be on guard." The track's misspelled title is taken from the television series Game of Thrones. On "Goliath", she declares, "I faced the Beast with my bare hands". "Gleaux" is an eccentric spelling of "glow", referring to what the narrator wants to do with her lover to see each other in the night. "Tug of War" concludes a conflicted quest for dominance at the expense of a lover's power. On the power ballad "Break of Dawn", Richard promises herself and a love interest that he will "never see the break of dawn". Richard, who wanted the album to end on a "hopeful" note, said that the title track "speaks of the fairytale. That naïveté. That moment where you felt anything is possible." According to Laurie Tuffrey of The Quietus, the song concludes Goldenheart's lyrical arc with a "wistful retrospect" on a relationship that began with Richard's declaring her "champion" on "In the Hearts Tonight" and shifted to "Tug of War", where she became "her own champion".

== Marketing and sales ==
Originally intended for release in October 2012, Richard delayed Goldenheart's release after signing a distribution deal with independent company Altavoz Distribution, which would release physical copies to retailers, and provide a wider marketing reach. The album's lead single, "'86", was released as a digital download on September 26. "Northern Lights" was released as the next single on April 8, 2013.

Goldenheart was released in the United States on January 15, 2013. Richard released the album independently, as she felt record labels were "taking a bit longer than we want". It sold 3,000 copies in its first week and debuted at number 137 on the Billboard 200, number 2 on the Top Heatseekers Albums, and number 68 on the Top R&B/Hip-Hop Albums. The album also reached the top of the iTunes Store's R&B chart, which prompted music retailer f.y.e. to preemptively release its physical CD.

== Critical reception ==
Professional ratings
Aggregate scores
Source	Rating
AnyDecentMusic?	7.9/10
Metacritic	81/100
Review scores
Source	Rating
AllMusic	4.5/5 stars
Exclaim!	6/10
The Guardian	5/5 stars
Newsday	B−
Now	4/5
Pitchfork	7.3/10
RedEye	3.5/4 stars
Slant Magazine	3/5 stars
Spin	9/10
Tom Hull – on the Web	B+

Goldenheart was met with widespread acclaim from critics, some of whom hailed Richard as one of the best new acts in pop and R&B. At Metacritic, which assigns a normalized rating out of 100 to reviews from mainstream publications, the album received an average score of 81, based on nine reviews.

Reviewing for The Guardian in January 2013, Alex Macpherson found Goldenheart "dazzling and imperious" because of how Richard's "array of sonic weapons matches her epic, elemental vision". Jason Gubbels of Spin praised her eclectic music and versatile singing, which he credited for "springing finely placed surprises on listeners lulled into reverie, navigating tricky spots just effortlessly enough to mask her mastery". Writing for NPR, Ann Powers found it altogether contemplative, joyful, and mythological. Jonathan Bogart of The Atlantic wrote that, with her Tolkien-inspired lyrics, Richard "remains true to the oldest and most important standards of R&B, which, more than any other musical genre, charts the uncountable intricacies of the human heart." Grantland critic Steven Hyden felt that the album blurs R&B conventions like Frank Ocean's Channel Orange (2012) and Janelle Monáe's The ArchAndroid (2010), and as "an ambitious, singular work", it demands repeated listens. AllMusic's Andy Kellman called Goldenheart "sumptuous and grand" with enough exceptional songs to compensate for its intensity and indulgence. Laurie Tuffrey from The Quietus said that Richard distinguishes herself from her R&B contemporaries with her exceptional creativity, while Pitchfork critic Andrew Ryce called her aptitude for theatricality "unparalleled" and wrote that her slightly "hammy" but "earnest personality both endears and empowers her work".

Goldenheart has all the trappings of the most appetizing critic bait currently on the market ... [It] might very well become the latest big-ideas record to influence the course of contemporary R&B, but Richard seems concerned only with the shape and sound of her own rapidly evolving music.

— Steven Hyden

Some reviewers were more critical. Slant Magazine's Jesse Cataldo wrote that, despite its interesting "musical palette and tenacious personality", Richard "falls back on the same tired tropes that have made many conventional R&B acts feel so exhaustingly familiar." Ryan B. Patrick of Exclaim! found the album's lyrics uninspired and wrote that it "functions as a hypnotic aural distraction, but little more." Ben Ratliff of The New York Times characterized Goldenheart as "oddball R&B ... at times mawkish, plodding, self-obsessed, gothy, campy, filmic", and mused, "Is it good? I don't know about that. But it has the dissonant attraction of something ventured. And it's confident enough to sound normal." Critic Tom Hull said, "People I respect love this and hate this, but it's so even-keeled I can't do either."

== Track listing ==
All songs were produced by Andrew "Druski" Scott, except where noted.

No.	Title	Lyrics	Music	Length
1.	"Intro (In the Hearts Tonight)"	Dawn Richard, Andrew "Druski" Scott	Scott	3:12
2.	"Return of a Queen"	Richard, Scott	Scott	4:27
3.	"Goliath"	Richard, Scott	Scott	2:30
4.	"Riot"	Richard, Scott	Scott	3:32
5.	"Gleaux" (produced by Andrew "Druski" Scott and Deonte)	Richard	Deonte Rogers, Scott	4:43
6.	"Pretty Wicked Things"	Richard, Scott	Scott	4:32
7.	"Northern Lights"	Scott	Scott	3:43
8.	"Frequency"	Richard, Scott	Scott	3:15
9.	"Warfaire"	Carla Carter, Richard, Scott	Scott	3:19
10.	"Tug of War" (produced by The Fisticuffs)	Richard	Mac Robinson, Brian Warfield	3:58
11.	"Ode to You"	Carter, Richard	Scott	4:14
12.	"'86"	Carter, Richard, Scott	Scott	3:22
13.	"In Your Eyes"	Richard, Scott	Scott	3:30
14.	"Break of Dawn"	Rosina Russell, Scott	Scott	6:00
15.	"[300]"	Carter, Scott	Scott	4:15
16.	"Goldenheart"	Richard	Claude Debussy,^{[A]} Scott	5:15

- ^{^[A]} "Goldenheart" samples "Clair de lune", composed by Claude Debussy.

== Personnel ==
Credits adapted from Metacritic.

- Andrew "Druski" Scott – producer
- Dawn Richard – vocals
- Deonte – producer
- The Fisticuffs – producer

== Charts ==
Chart (2013)	Peak position
UK Independent Albums Breakers	16
US Billboard 200	137
US Independent Albums	21
US Top Heatseekers Albums	2
US Top R&B/Hip-Hop Albums	7

== Release history ==
Region	Date	Label	Format
United Kingdom	January 15, 2013	Our Dawn Entertainment	digital download
United States	January 15, 2013	Our Dawn Entertainment	digital download
United States	January 22, 2013	Our Dawn Entertainment	CD
United Kingdom	February 11, 2013	Altavoz c/o Planetworks	CD
