= Second Line (album) =

Studio album by Dawn Richard
- Released: April 30, 2021
- Genres: Alternative R&B; electronic; house
- Length: 51:07
- Label: Merge Records
- Producers: Dawn Richard; Ila Orbis; Joe Beats; Kaveh Rastegar; J-Rick; Sam O.B

Dawn Richard chronology
New Breed (2019)	Second Line (2021)	Pigments (2022)

Singles from New Breed
- 1. "Bussifame" Released: February 16, 2021; 2. "Jacuzzi" Released: March 22, 2021; 3. "Mornin / Streetlights" Released: April 22, 2021; 4. "Boomerang" Released: April 30, 2021

Second Line (alternatively titled Second Line: An Electro Revival) is the sixth studio album by American singer-songwriter Dawn Richard. It was released on April 30, 2021 through Merge Records. The title refers to the parade tradition of the same name practiced in Richard's hometown of New Orleans.

== Reception ==
Professional ratings
Aggregate scores
Source	Rating
AnyDecentMusic?	7.1/10
Metacritic	80/100
Review scores
Source	Rating
AllMusic	4/5 stars
Beats Per Minute	7.8/10
Clash	3.5/5 stars
Exclaim!	3/5 stars
The Guardian	3/5 stars
The Line of Best Fit	9/10
Loud and Quiet	3/5 stars
Paste	7.2/10
Pitchfork	8.0/10
Rolling Stone	4/5 stars

Second Line received exceedingly excellent reviews from music critics, and holds a rating of 80 out of 100 on the review aggregator Metacritic.

=== Accolades ===
Second Line on year-end lists
Publication	List	Rank	Ref.
Paste	The 50 Best Albums of 2021	47	
Pitchfork	The 50 Best Albums of 2021	22	
Rolling Stone	The 50 Best Albums of 2021	22	

== Track listing ==
Second Line track listing

No.	Title	Length
1.	"King Creole (Intro)"	1:20
2.	"Nostalgia"	3:01
3.	"Boomerang"	3:05
4.	"Bussifame"	3:05
5.	"Pressure"	4:10
6.	"Pilot (a lude)"	0:58
7.	"Jacuzzi"	3:20
8.	"FiveOhFour (a lude)"	5:42
9.	"Voodoo (Intermission)"	1:37
10.	"Mornin / Streetlights"	6:46
11.	"Le Petit Morte (a lude)"	1:14
12.	"Radio Free"	2:01
13.	"The Potter"	2:54
14.	"Perfect Storm"	5:38
15.	"Voodoo (Outermission)"	2:13
16.	"SELFish (Outro)"	7:00
Total length:		51:07
