= Warm on a Cold Night =

Studio album by Honne
- Released: 22 July 2016; 9 December 2016 (Remixed version)
- Genre: Electro-soul
- Length: 51:02
- Labels: Tatemae; Atlantic
- Producers: Richard Wilkinson; Honne; Mark Ralph

Honne chronology
Gone Are the Days (2016)	Warm on a Cold Night (2016)	Love Me / Love Me Not (2018)

Singles from Warm on a Cold Night
- 1. "Warm on a Cold Night" Released: 1 September 2014; 2. "All in the Value" Released: 24 November 2014; 3. "Coastal Love" Released: 1 May 2015; 4. "Someone That Loves You" Released: 8 April 2016; 5. "Good Together" Released: 12 July 2016

Warm on a Cold Night is the debut studio album by British electronic music duo Honne. It was released on 22 July 2016 by Tatemae and Atlantic Records. The album features guest appearance by British singer-songwriter Izzy Bizu.

== Critical reception ==
Professional ratings
Aggregate scores
Source	Rating
Metacritic	69/100
Review scores
Source	Rating
AllMusic	4/5 stars
Clash	8/10
DIY Magazine	2/5 stars
The Guardian	3/5 stars
NOW Magazine	3/5 stars
The Observer	4/5 stars

Upon its release, Warm on a Cold Night received generally positive reviews from music critics. Writing for AllMusic, Liam Martin gave the album 4 out of 5 stars and highlighted the tracks, "Warm on a Cold Night", "Someone That Loves You" and "Treat You Right". Lisa Henderson from Clash magazine called the album as "an irresistible piece of steamy electro-soul" and gave the album an 8 out of 10, while Kitty Empire from The Observer called it "danceable, but not braindead". Writing for NOW Magazine, Paula Reid gave the album 3 out of 5 stars, saying, "Andy and James stepped deeper into their own sound, with more inventive lyrics and dynamic melodies." Reid also noted the 1970s and 1980s soul and funk influences in the album. The Guardian gave a mixed review of the album, saying, "a studied sort of soul that belongs more in a Spotify aggregated playlist than on a sleazy late-night radio show."

Liam McNeilly from DIY Magazine gave the album 2 out of 5 stars, saying, "Honne’s debut could be a triumph, but finds itself prone to mumbling and shallowness."

== Commercial performance ==
Warm on a Cold Night made its debut in United Kingdom at number thirty-seven. The album sold 2,227 copies in its first week.

== Track listing ==
Credits adapted from Tidal.
All tracks written by Andy Clutterbuck and James Hatcher, except where noted. All tracks produced by Honne, except where noted.

Warm on a Cold Night – Standard edition
No.	Title	Writer(s)	Producer(s)	Length
1.	"Warm on a Cold Night"	Andy Clutterbuck; James Hatcher; William Coutts	Richard Wilkinson	4:21
2.	"Til the Evening"			4:40
3.	"Someone That Loves You" (featuring Izzy Bizu)	Clutterbuck; Hatcher; Isobel Bizu Beardshaw		4:04
4.	"All in the Value"		Wilkinson	3:42
5.	"Treat You Right"			4:02
6.	"Out of My Control"			4:54
7.	"Coastal Love"			4:05
8.	"It Ain't Wrong Loving You"			3:16
9.	"The Night"		Honne; Wilkinson	5:02
10.	"Good Together"			3:48
11.	"One at a Time Please"			4:39
12.	"FHKD"			4:29
Total length:				51:02

Warm on a Cold Night – Deluxe edition bonus tracks
No.	Title	Producer(s)	Length
13.	"Take You High"		4:08
14.	"Baby You're Bad"	Mark Ralph	3:48
15.	"Gone Are the Days"		4:42
16.	"3AM"		3:48
Total length:			58:58

Warm on a Cold Night (Remixed)
No.	Title	Length
1.	"FHKD" (Pat Lok Remix)	5:06
2.	"Treat You Right" (Sivey Remix)	4:01
3.	"Coastal Love" (Klaves Remix)	3:51
4.	"Warm on a Cold Night" (Embody Remix)	3:26
5.	"Gone Are the Days" (SOHN Remix)	4:17
6.	"Good Together" (Jarami Remix)	3:50
7.	"Gone Are the Days" (MXXWLL Remix)	3:40
8.	"All in the Value" (Filip Remix)	3:00
9.	"Someone That Loves You" (Joe Goddard Remix)	5:13
10.	"Gone Are the Days" (Riton Remix)	3:53
11.	"Warm on a Cold Night (The Lonely Players Club)" (Gnash & 4e Remix)	3:25
12.	"FHKD" (featuring Kill J)	4:09
Total length:		46:25

Notes

- "Warm on a Cold Night" features voice-over by William Coutts.
- "Coastal Love" features additional vocals by Tamsin Wilson.
- "It Ain't Wrong Loving You", "Good Together" and "Take You High" feature additional vocals by House Gospel Choir.

== Personnel ==
Credits adapted from Tidal.

=== Performers and musicians ===
- Andy Clutterbuck – vocals, songwriting, keyboard, bass guitar, drums, guitar, programming, synthesizer
- James Hatcher – vocals, songwriting, keyboard, bass guitar, drums, guitar, programming, synthesizer
- William Coutts – songwriting, voice-over
- Izzy Bizu – vocals, songwriting
- Tamsin Wilson – vocals
- House Gospel Choir – vocals
- Alex Reeves – drums
- Hal Ritson – programming
- Richard Adlam – programming
- Richard Wilkinson – programming

=== Production ===
- Richard Wilkinson – production
- Andy Clutterbuck – production
- James Hatcher – production
- Mark 'Spike' Stent – mixing
- Wez Clarke – mixing
- Manny Marroquin – mixing
- Chris Galland – mixing
- Stuart Hawkes – mastering engineer
- Robin Florent – engineering
- Richard Adlam – engineering
- Hal Ritson – engineering
- Steve Honest – engineering
- Jett Jackson – engineering

== Charts ==
Chart (2016)	Peak position
Belgian Albums (Ultratop Flanders)	117
Belgian Albums (Ultratop Wallonia)	121
Dutch Albums (Album Top 100)	128
German Albums (Offizielle Top 100)	52
UK Albums (Official Charts)	37

== Release history ==
List of release dates, formats, label, editions and reference
Date	Format(s)	Label	Edition(s)	Ref.
22 July 2016	CD; digital download	Tatemae; Atlantic	Standard; deluxe	
9 December 2016	Digital download	Tatemae; Atlantic	Remixed version	
