= Been a While =

Studio album by Dawn Angeliqué
- Released: October 18, 2005
- Genre: R&B, soul
- Length: 44:35
- Label: Yeah Brother! Records

Dawn Angeliqué chronology
Been a While (2005)	The Prelude to A Tell Tale Heart (2011)

Been a While is the debut studio album by American recording artist and songwriter Dawn Richard, under the name of Dawn Angeliqué. The album was released in the fall 2005 through the independent label Yeah!Brother. The album features production and vocals by American singer B'Shipe as well as rapper Pooh Bear, as well as songwriting and co-production by American singer Ne-Yo. Musically the album has been categorized as soul and contemporary R&B.

== Background ==
Richard was first discovered as a solo artist by Kemic A. Smothers during a 2004 live performance at Tipitina's Uptown in New Orleans, which led to her being signed under the pseudonym "Dawn Angelique" to an exclusive recording contract with Octarve Anderson, Jr. and his Atlanta-based independent music label, Yeah! Brother Records. The album was then finalized via recording sessions in Los Angeles, Atlanta and New Orleans with the production by The NexMen, Rochad Holiday and Curtis "Sauce" Wilson. According to Billboard the album was recorded while the singer was attending the University of New Orleans and working as a cheerleader for the NBA's New Orleans Hornets, around the time she made her first appearance on MTV's Making The Band 3.

== Track listing ==
Confirmed by Amazon.com and Discogs.com.

No.	Title	Length
1.	"So What"	4:08
2.	"Been a While"	3:34
3.	"Still in Love"	3:34
4.	"Callin' Me" (featuring Jon Jon)	3:44
5.	"Make It Hot" (featuring Pooh Bear)	4:09
6.	"All I Need" (featuring B'Shipe)	5:23
7.	"Booty in Da Pants" (featuring Jon Jon)	4:19
8.	"U Don't Know"	3:48
9.	"I Need You" (featuring Pooh Bear)	3:38
10.	"New"	3:34
Total length:		42:00
