= Blackheart (album) =

Studio album by Dawn Richard
- Released: January 15, 2015
- Genres: Electronica, alternative R&B, dance-pop
- Length: 63:42
- Label: Our Dawn
- Producers: Noisecastle III (Scott Bruzenak) & Swagg R'celious

Dawn Richard chronology
| Goldenheart (2013) | Blackheart (2015) | Infrared (2016) |

Singles from Blackheart
- 1. "Blow" Released: October 26, 2014; 2. "Tide (The Paradox Effect)" Released: January 15, 2015; 3. "Choices" Released: February 1, 2015; 4. "Projection" Released: March 16, 2015; 5. "Calypso" Released: April 29, 2015; 6. "Titans X James Dean" Released: May 27, 2015; 7. "Billie Jean" Released: October 5, 2015

Blackheart is the third studio album by the American singer Dawn Richard, which was released on January 15, 2015, by Our Dawn Entertainment. The album was originally scheduled for an October 2013 release, but was pushed back for the production of the third Danity Kane album DK3. None of the previously released singles ("Judith", "Meteors", "Levitate" and "Valkyrie") can be found on the final track listing.

== Background ==
Goldenheart put you on a battlefield in medieval times. Blackheart will put you in a place where you're stuck in a rainforest by yourself, and you realize that you have all this armor, but you have this blood on you as well.

— Dawn Richard, Billboard

The release of the album was initially announced in May 2011 in Rap-Up magazine as part of an upcoming trilogy of albums. By July 2013, after the self-funded January released Goldenheart had sold a total of 9,000 copies domestically, Richard found herself lacking sufficient funds to produce her next album, leading to her starting a campaign via Kickstarter in which she asked her fans to donate a total of 25,000 dollars. With 133 backers lending 2,854 dollars, Richard was not able to reach her goal, however, and the campaign was unsuccessful. At that time, the album was intended to be released by October 7, 2013, and to include 11 or 12 songs. The logos and art work were to be chosen interactively by her fans, like the choice of the second single between two songs "Judith" and "Valkyrie". The latter was later remixed with the singer JoJo.

By early September 2013, the album was eventually postponed due to Richard, Aubrey O'Day, Aundrea Fimbres and Shannon Bex deciding to reunite as Danity Kane. In an interview with Billboard magazine on March 13, 2014, when asked about the status of Blackheart, Richard explained that it was still in production, and was the second installment of three albums to be ended with Redemptionheart. She elaborated on how it continues the story of the first part of the trilogy, while it would exist with a slightly dissimilar atmosphere, saying, "Goldenheart put you on a battlefield in medieval times. Blackheart will put you in a place where you're stuck in a rainforest by yourself, and you realize that you have all this armor, but you have this blood on you as well." Next to the digitally released singles "Valkyrie", "Levitate", "Judith" and "Meteors", a song called "Tide", described as ""Judith"'s step-sister" was not added to the regular track list of the album. The latter song, however, can be found as a bonus track on the vinyl edition of the album. Richard explained in an interview with Billboard in October that her grandmother's death and her father's diagnosis with cancer inspired her to prove that she had a story to tell as well as wanting to make the people she had lost proud. And with her two member team — consisting of herself and her business partner Kyle Cabrol — Richard again flouted the odds with her new project. She grabbed the No. 1 spot on iTunes’ Top 100 Electronic Albums chart and the No. 2 spot on Billboard’s Top Dance/Electronic Albums chart without any dramatic promo, conventional album marketing or even a label.

== Promotion ==
On the release day of Blackheart Richard visited the New York City Apple Store to tape an episode of its "Meet The Musician" podcasts. The first interview of her addressing the Danity Kane break-up was released in Rap-Up on the same day. Next to that Richard released a music video for the vinyl edition bonus track, "Tide". Other promotional appearances during the release week included the Power 105.1's The Breakfast Club, and the radio show Sway in the Morning.

== Critical reception ==
Professional ratings
Aggregate scores
| Source | Rating |
|---|---|
| Metacritic | 85/100 |
Review scores
| Source | Rating |
| Fact | 4.5/5 |
| Now | 4/5 |
| Pitchfork | 8.0/10 |
| Spin | 8/10 |
| Tiny Mix Tapes | 4/5 |
| Tom Hull – on the Web | B |

Blackheart received widespread acclaim from critics, who noted the darker subject material compared to previous work. In reference to the album, Spin described Richard as a "prefab non-headliner gone rogue as a weirdo genius". Pitchfork lauded the album for its personal content and vision and described the project as "heaving, apocalyptic dance-pop, somewhere between Björk and Brandy". Fact welcomed the change in direction of this album compared to Richard's other work, Armor On and Goldenheart. The non-traditional pop aspects of the album, such as the electronic and synthesizer production and verse structure were also welcomed.

British newspaperThe Guardian described Richard as "too good to ignore" in its review of Blackheart, stating:

The most ambitious and revelatory album of the year might be the lowest-profile, despite (or perhaps because of) its creator's mainstream connections. Dawn Richard's Blackheart is a wild ride through the kind of constantly shapeshifting electronics that make everyone else's so-called "innovation" sound timid – and the emotional peaks and troughs give a sense of purpose to her experimentation. It starts with a piercing [a capella] cry – "I thought I lost it all" – and its twists and turns thereafter take in Greek mythology and feminist retellings of the Billie Jean groupie archetype, as Richard tells a tale of failure, loss and ultimate triumph. Co-produced by Richard and the relative unknown Noisecastle III, Blackheart sounds like little else. There are brief reminders of Björk's Medúlla in the amphibious vocal layering of "Titans", Moby's "Go" in the frantic rhythms of "Calypso"[,] or Aaliyah's "What If" in "Adderall/Sold"'s lurch into rock, but they are only the barest hints.

Tom Hull was less receptive, noting "some interesting beat production here", but ultimately finding the album "cluttered and cranky" overall.

=== Accolades ===
| Publication | Accolade | Year | Rank |
|---|---|---|---|
| Fact | The 50 Best Albums of 2015 | 2015 | 1 |
| Spin | The 25 Best Albums of 2015 (Dan Weiss List) | 2015 | 3 |
| Rolling Stone | 20 Best R&B Albums of 2015 | 2015 | 6 |
| Tiny Mix Tapes | The 50 Best Albums of 2015 | 2015 | 20 |
| Pitchfork | The 50 Best Albums of 2015 | 2015 | 50 |
| Los Angeles Times | 2015's Must-Hear Albums | 2015 | * |

== Track listing ==
From Discogs.

| No. | Title | Length |
|---|---|---|
| 1. | "Noir" (intro) | 1:23 |
| 2. | "Calypso" | 4:25 |
| 3. | "Blow" | 4:29 |
| 4. | "Billie Jean" | 4:37 |
| 5. | "Adderall / Sold" (outerlude) | 7:28 |
| 6. | "Swim Free" | 3:59 |
| 7. | "Titans" (interlude) | 2:06 |
| 8. | "Warriors" | 5:40 |
| 9. | "Projection" | 5:59 |
| 10. | "Castles" | 4:42 |
| 11. | "Phoenix" (featuring Aundrea Fimbres) | 4:04 |
| 12. | "Choices" (interlude) | 2:58 |
| 13. | "The Deep" | 5:07 |
| 14. | "Blackheart" (outro) | 4:30 |
| 15. | "Tide" (vinyl edition bonus track) | 4:30 |

== Charts ==
| Chart (2015) | Peak position |
|---|---|
| US Dance/Electronic Albums | 2 |
| US Top Heatseekers Albums | 2 |
| US Top Independent Albums | 1 |

== Release history ==
| Region | Date | Label | Format |
|---|---|---|---|
| Worldwide | January 15, 2015 | Our Dawn Entertainment | Digital download |
