= Honne (band) =

English electronic music duo

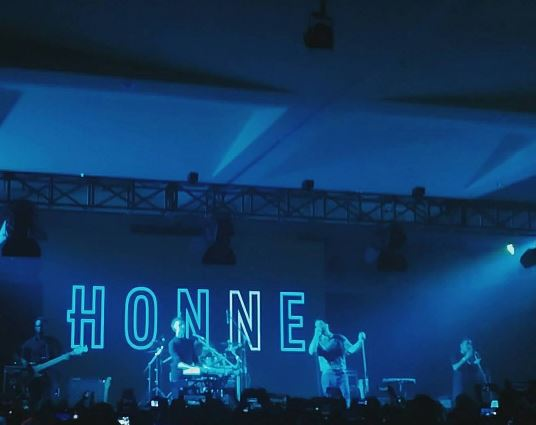
- Andy and James of Honne, performing in Music Gallery at Jakarta, 2017

Background information
- Origin: Bow, London, England
- Genres: Synthpop; R&B; dance-pop; sophisti-pop; soul
- Years active: 2014–present
- Labels: Tatemae; Atlantic; AWAL
- Members: Andy Clutterbuck; James Hatcher
- Website: hellohonne.com

Honne (stylised as HONNE) are an English electronic music duo formed in 2014 in Bow, London, consisting of James Hatcher (producer) and Andy Clutterbuck (singer, producer). Honne's debut studio album, Warm on a Cold Night, was released 22 July 2016. Their second album, Love Me/Love Me Not, followed on 28 August 2018. The duo then released their first mixtape, No Song Without You, on 3 July 2020. Across these albums the band have achieved gold, platinum and multiplatinum certifications in multiple countries around the world. Their third album, Let's Just Say the World Ended a Week from Now, What Would You Do?, was released on 22 October 2021.

== Music career ==
=== 2014: Early career and first EPs ===
Clutterbuck and Hatcher met while at university and started making music together under the name of Honne—a Japanese word (本音) meaning "true feelings"—in late 2014. Honne's musical style has been described as "futuristic soul destined to re-invent babymaking music" by The Telegraph. The band released their debut single "Warm on a Cold Night" in September 2014 via Super Recordings. They followed up with their second EP, All in the Value, in November 2014, and made their live debut at the Sebright Arms on the same day.

=== 2015: Coastal Love EP and live performances ===
Honne started 2015 with a sold out show at Electrowerkz in London in February before announcing the release of their EP Coastal Love on their own label Tatemae Recordings, which they have released all of their works under since. Following the release of Coastal Love on 1 May, the band played a sold out headline gig at The Laundry in London on 13 May and performed on the BBC Introducing stage at BBC Radio 1's Big Weekend 2015 in Norwich. From early to mid-2015, the band performed at various festivals in the UK and across Europe, including The Great Escape Festival, Field Day, Calvi on the Rocks, and Latitude.

=== 2016: Warm on a Cold Night ===
On 22 July 2016, Honne released their first full-length album, Warm on a Cold Night. The album cover features an image taken on the night of one of their London shows. The album achieved huge popularity and success internationally, particularly in Asia, where the album has gone multi-platinum in South Korea, Thailand and Indonesia.

From late-2016 to mid-2017, the band toured extensively, performing at various festivals around Asia, Europe and North America, including Coachella, Lollapalooza, Osheaga, Wanderland, WayHome Festival and Summerwell.

On 7 April 2017, Honne released a new version of "Warm on a Cold Night" featuring American rapper Aminé. Honne released a single titled "Just Dance" on 7 July 2017.

=== 2018: Love Me/Love Me Not ===
Honne released their second album, Love Me/Love Me Not on 24 August 2018. The album features Tom Misch, Georgia, Anna of the North, Beka, and Nana Rogues. The album continued to build on their success, again going multi-platinum or gold in multiple territories.

On 27 March 2019, the band released a new version of "Crying Over You" featuring RM of BTS. On 3 November 2018, the duo released a stripped back live performance of "Location Unknown" featuring Beka. This version of the track was particularly well received, gaining over 126 million views on YouTube and over 92 million streams on Spotify, and later got synced to the film Ali & Ratu Ratu Queens.

The album campaign saw the band touring in many parts of the world, as well as playing several festivals including All Points East, Corona Capital, NOS Alive, Shaky Knees, Lollapalooza Stockholm, and Sziget Festival.

=== 2020: No Song Without You ===
On 3 July 2020, during the global coronavirus pandemic, Honne released the mixtape No Song Without You.

=== 2021: Let's Just Say the World Ended a Week from Now, What Would You Do? ===
Honne released their third studio album, Let's Just Say the World Ended a Week from Now, What Would You Do?, on 22 October 2021. Singles from the album include features from Khalid, Griff, Niki, Pink Sweats, and Sofía Valdés. Other non-featuring collaborators on the album include Sam Smith and Arlo Parks.

=== 2024: OUCH ===
Honne's fourth studio album was released on 6 September 2024. The pre-release single Backseat Driver was released on 12 July.

== Discography ==
=== Studio albums ===
Title	Details	Peak chart positions					
Title	Details	UK	BEL (FL)	BEL (WA)	GER	NED	SCO
Warm on a Cold Night	Released: 22 July 2016; Label: Tatemae, Atlantic; Format: CD, LP, digital download	37	117	121	52	128	70
Love Me/Love Me Not	Released: 24 August 2018; Label: Atlantic; Format: CD, LP, digital download	—	—	—	—	—	—
Let's Just Say the World Ended a Week from Now, What Would You Do?	Released: 22 October 2021; Label: Tatemae, Atlantic; Format: CD, LP, digital download	—	—	—	—	—	—
Ouch	Released: 6 September 2024; Label: Tatemae, Atlantic/AWAL; Format: CD, LP, digital download	—	—	—	—	—	—

=== Mixtapes ===
Title	Details
No Song Without You	Released: 3 July 2020; Label: Tatemae, Atlantic; Format: CD, LP, digital download

=== Extended plays ===
Title	Details
Warm on a Cold Night	Released: 1 September 2014; Re-released: 10 April 2015; Label: Super, Tatemae; Format: Digital download
All in the Value	Released: 24 November 2014; Re-released: 10 April 2015; Label: Super, Tatemae; Format: Digital download
Coastal Love	Released: 1 May 2015; Label: Tatemae, Atlantic; Format: CD-R, digital download
Over Lover	Released: 2 September 2015; Label: Tatemae, Atlantic; Format: Digital download
Gone Are the Days	Released: 22 January 2016; Label: Tatemae, Atlantic; Format: CD, LP, digital download

=== Songwriting and production credits ===
Title	Year	Artist	Production	Writing
Melt	2016	JONES	check	check
Walk My Way	2016	JONES	check	check
Painkiller	2017	Liv Dawson	check	check
Radar (feat. HONNE)	2018	Whethan	check	check
Nothing On You	2019	Lily Moore	check	check
Someone That Loves You '19	2019	Izzy Bizu (w/ Chris Martin)	check	check
Overdose (with HONNE)	2019	SG Lewis	check	check
More Than Friends (feat. HONNE)	2020	Beka	check	check
My One	2020	Beka	check	check
I'll Be There	2020	Beka	check	check
1,000,000 X Better (feat. HONNE)	2020	Griff	check	check
Seoul (prod. HONNE)	2020	RM of BTS	check	check
Green Lights	2021	Beka	check	
Spaceman	2021	Suppasit Jongcheveevat	check	check
Closer (with Paul Blanco, Mahalia)	2022	RM of BTS	check	check

=== Remixes ===
Title	Year	Artist
Eyes Shut (Honne Remix)	2015	Years & Years
Shivers (Honne Remix)	2015	SG Lewis
Just Once (Honne Remix)	2015	Shura
Under The Shadows (HONNE Remix)	2015	Rae Morris
Concrete (HONNE Remix)	2016	Tom Odell
Lost - HONNE Remix	2016	The Temper Trap
Indulge - Honne Remix	2016	JONES
Miss You (HONNE Remix)	2016	James Hersey
Cry Baby - HONNE Remix	2016	Fickle Friends
Beach (HONNE Remix)	2017	Will Joseph Cook
Pretty Shining People - HONNE Remix	2018	George Ezra
Nights Like This (feat. Ty Dolla $ign) (HONNE Remix)	2019	Kehlani
Maybe Don't (feat. JP Saxe) (HONNE Remix)	2020	Maisie Peters
A Million Times (HONNE remix)	2020	Cosmo's Midnight
Never Gonna Be Alone (Honne Remix)	2022	Jacob Collier
My Baby Just Cares For Me (HONNE Remix)	2022	Nina Simone
