= Armor On =

EP by Dawn Richard
- Released: March 27, 2012
- Recorded: 2011–12
- Genres: Alternative R&B, experimental
- Length: 45:00
- Labels: Our Dawn Entertainment, Cheartbreaker Music Group
- Producers: Andrew Scott, Dawn Richard (Exec.)

Dawn Richard chronology
The Prelude to A Tell Tale Heart (2011)	Armor On (2012)	Whiteout (2012)

Singles from Armor On
- 1. "Bombs" Released: March 27, 2012; 2. "Automatic" Released: June 18, 2012

Armor On is the first EP and second major release by American recording artist Dawn Richard as a solo act. Dawn Richard is best known for being a part of Diddy – Dirty Money and Danity Kane. The album and track listing for Armor On was revealed on March 7, 2012. The album serves as a prelude to her upcoming album Goldenheart Trilogy, the first of which was released in January 2013. Armor On was released exclusively on iTunes.

Richard released several songs before the release of the album. "S.M.F.U (Save Me from You)" was the first. A black-and-white video for "S.M.F.U" was released online. "Change" was released as the second promotional single from Armor On, while "Black Lipstick" was chosen as the third promotional single.

The lead single "Bombs" debuted March 27 and Richard appeared on 106 & Park to premiere the video. On June 25, the video for the second single "Automatic" premiered on 106 & Park.

== Background ==
Following what Dawn said was an amicable split with Dirty Money, Diddy told her that she would have to wait a year or two to release a solo project if she stuck around, but after requesting a release, he granted it. "It was a choice and I needed to go where the best place was for me," said Dawn. "As an artist, you can't wait two years. People forget about you in three seconds, so you have to grind like no other to stay relevant. He was gracious enough to say, 'I'll let you do that.' Labels don't do that. They'll shelve you. [...] I was so thankful that he didn't do what everybody said he was gonna do. He was like, 'You gave me six years, so here's your chance.'"

In an interview Richard said "You're gonna hear R&B taken to a whole 'nother level." She worked with Druski on nine of the EP's 10 tracks. The EP serves as a prelude to her album Goldenheart. Richard released several songs before the anticipated release date ("Change", "Black Lipstick", "Fly", and the bass-driven "Bombs") though "Fly" is not on the final track listing. This EP serves as an opening to the sound of Goldenheart. Dawn Richard presented Armor On at a listening session in Beverly Hills on March 21, 2012. In an interview Richard spoke on her feelings about Armor On, saying "We are pushing the limits. [...] R&B is really linear and it's not a bad thing. I just think being with Danity Kane and being with Dirty Money, I've experienced so many things sonically and lyrically that I want ya'll to be moved. It's time for something a little bit more refreshing. I want to be that person for you guys."

== Reception ==
=== Critical response ===
Professional ratings
Review scores
Source	Rating
About.com	3.5/5 stars
Allmusic	4/5 stars
Pitchfork Media	(8.2/10)
The Guardian	4/5 stars
Rap-Up	favorable
The Uptown Lounge	favorable
Muso's Guide	favorable
The A.V. Club	favorable

Armor On received considerable acclaim from critics.

== Track listing ==
No.	Title	Writer(s)	Length
1.	"Call to Hearts (Intro)"	Dawn Richard	2:53
2.	"Black Lipstick"	Richard, Andrew Scott	4:08
3.	"Bombs"	Scott	3:38
4.	"Automatic"	Scott, Carla Carter	4:26
5.	"Change"	Richard	3:17
6.	"Heaven" (featuring Druski)	Richard, Scott	3:55
7.	"Faith"	Richard, Lewis	3:43
8.	"Scripture"	Richard, Scott	4:24
9.	"Save Me from U (Remix)"	Richard, Scott	3:16
10.	"The Battle (Outro)"	Richard	2:32
Total length:			45:00

Notes:

- "Wild 'N' Young" is not featured for purchase in the iTunes Store. A video for this song was released in August 2012, but under the name Wild 'N' Faith.

== Personnel ==
=== Musicians ===
- Dawn Richard – vocals

=== Productions ===
- Druski – producer
- Ricky "Ric Rude" Lewis – producer
- Carla Carter – songwriter
- Stan Greene – engineer

=== Staff ===
- Kyle Cabrol – Executive Assistant

== Charts ==
Chart (2012)	Peak position
US Billboard 200	145
US R&B/Hip-Hop Albums	28
US Independent Albums	25
US Top Heatseekers	4

== Release history ==
Region	Date	Format(s)
Worldwide	March 27, 2012	Digital download
