= Believe Me (Navos song) =

2021 debut single by Navos

Single by Navos
- Released: 22 January 2021
- Genre: Deep house
- Length: 3:08
- Label: Island
- Songwriter: Ross Harrington
- Producers: Ross Harrington; Tom Demac

Navos singles chronology
"Believe Me" (2021)	"You & I" (2021)

Music video
- "Believe Me" on YouTube

"Believe Me" is a song by British producer Navos. It was released on 22 January 2021, via Island Records. The song went viral on TikTok and reached number 23 on the UK Singles Chart.

== Music video ==
An accompanying music video was released on 19 March 2021.

== Charts ==
=== Weekly charts ===
Weekly chart performance for "Believe Me"
Chart (2021)	Peak position
Ireland (IRMA)	27
Poland (Polish Airplay Top 100)	33
UK Dance (OCC)	8
UK Singles (OCC)	23
US Hot Dance/Electronic Songs (Billboard)	15

=== Year-end charts ===
Year-end chart performance for "Believe Me"
Chart (2021)	Position
UK Singles (OCC)	72
US Hot Dance/Electronic Songs (Billboard)	76

== Certifications ==
Certifications for "Believe Me"
Region	Certification	Certified units/sales
Poland (ZPAV)	Gold	25,000^{‡}
United Kingdom (BPI)	Platinum	600,000^{‡}
^{‡} Sales+streaming figures based on certification alone.
