= Dawn Richard =

American singer (born 1983)

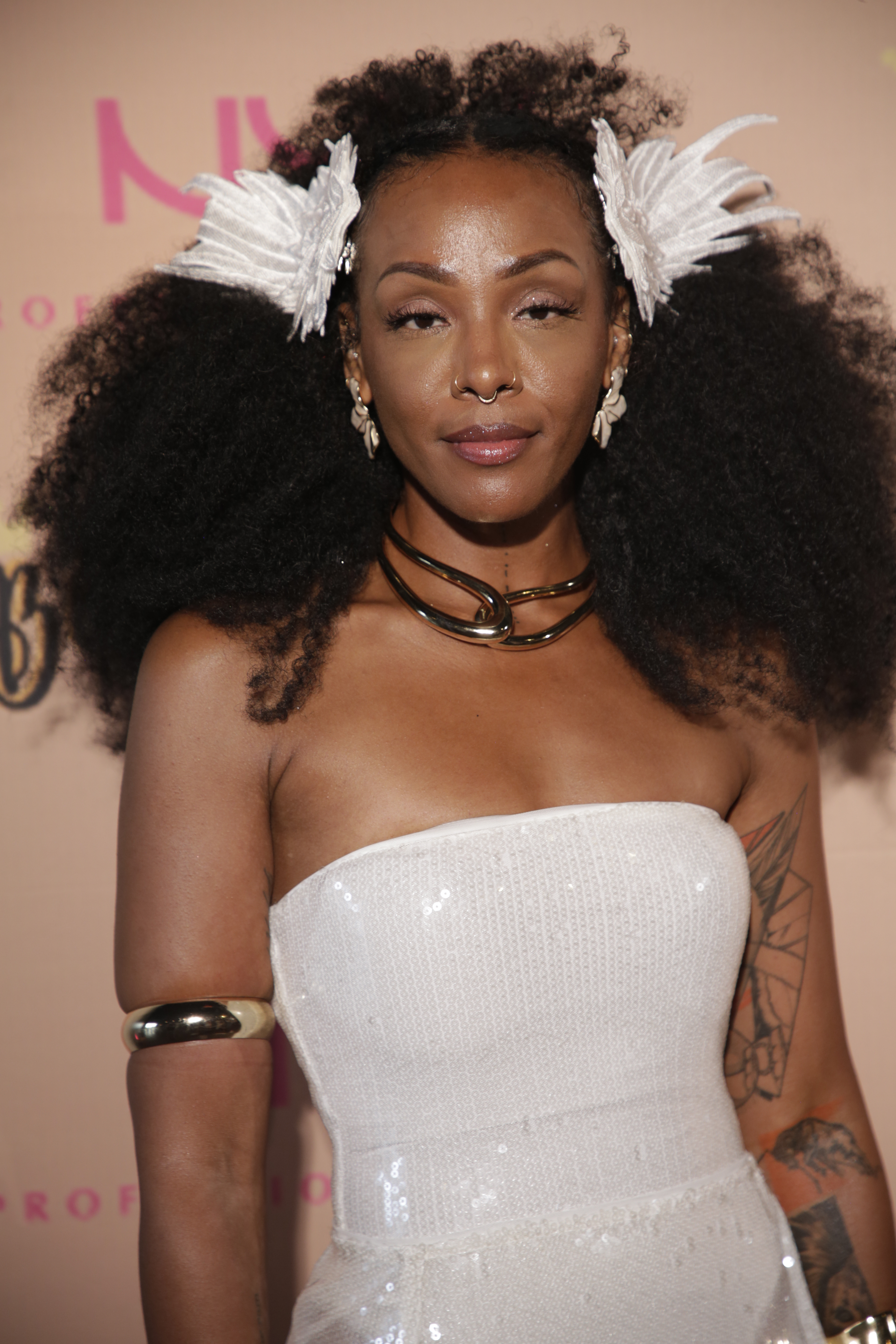
- Richard at Black Excellence Brunch in 2026

Background information
- Born: Dawn Angeliqué Richard; August 5, 1983 (age 43); New Orleans, Louisiana, U.S.
- Genres: R&B; pop; art pop; electronic
- Occupations: Singer; songwriter; dancer; actress
- Works: Dawn Richard discography
- Years active: 2005–present
- Labels: Local Action; Our Dawn; MBK; Creative Artists Agency; RED; Merge; Bad Boy
- Formerly of: Danity Kane; Dirty Money

Dawn Angeliqué Richard (born August 5, 1983) is an American singer from New Orleans, Louisiana. She began her career auditioning for MTV's Making the Band 3 in 2004, during which she formed the girl group Danity Kane.

The group signed with Sean "Diddy" Combs's Bad Boy Records to release three studio albums until their temporary disbandment in 2009. In July of that same year, Richard formed the musical trio Diddy – Dirty Money with label boss Combs and fellow R&B singer Kalenna Harper. The group released their only album, Last Train to Paris (2010) to critical and commercial success; it was preceded and followed by two mixtapes until their 2012 disbandment. The following year, she reformed Danity Kane with three of its five original members to release one further album–DK3 (2013).

During her first year with Danity Kane, she pursued a solo career with the release of her debut studio album, Been a While (2005). In 2011, following her departure from Bad Boy Records, Richard re-emerged as a soloist performing as DΔWN, later to be stylized as DAWN. Released as a trilogy, her next albums: Goldenheart (2013), Blackheart (2015), and Redemption (2016) experimented with alternative dance and electronic influences. Richard's fifth and sixth albums, New Breed (2019) and Second Line (2021) were both met with critical acclaim. In 2018, she co-produced and starred in the erotic action thriller Kinky, which was critically panned.

== Early life ==
Richard is of Louisiana Creole and Haitian descent and was born in New Orleans, Louisiana. She has one brother. She later moved to Baltimore, Maryland, due to being displaced following Hurricane Katrina. Music has played an influential part in her life since early childhood. Her father is Frank Richard, lead singer and percussionist of the popular funk/soul band Chocolate Milk. Her mother owned a dancing school where Richard spent much of her childhood developing her choreography and singing skills, but currently works at a school in Baltimore, Maryland.

Early in her teens, Richard began performing with a local New Orleans group called "Realiti". Discovered as a solo artist by Kemic A. Smothers at a 2004 live performance at Tipitina's Uptown in New Orleans, Richard was soon signed under the name "Dawn Angelique" to an exclusive recording contract/development deal with Octarve Anderson Jr. and his Atlanta independent record label, Yeah! Brother Records. Recording in Los Angeles, Atlanta and New Orleans, Richard and Yeah! Brother records, along with platinum awarded production team The NexMen, Rochad Holiday and Curtis "Sauce" Wilson, crafted a studio solo album called Been a While, featuring the single "So What" which was co-produced by Ne-Yo. Yeah! Brother Records and its New Orleans management company, Scratch Entertainment, headed by Kemic A. Smothers, Esq., agreed after negotiations with Sean "Diddy" Combs of Bad Boy Records, to postpone release of the album while arranging an immediate release from her exclusive recording contract with Yeah! Brother Records. Although it had no releases and did not chart, the studio album Been a While was still good enough to secure her a spot as the opening act for Anthony Hamilton in Tallahassee, Florida. During the recording of the album, she focused on touring and live performances, dance, and becoming an NBA cheerleader for the New Orleans Hornets while attending the University of New Orleans.

== Career ==
=== 2005–2009: Making the Band 3 and Danity Kane ===
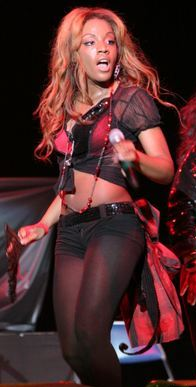
Richard with Danity Kane in 2006

Richard's significant opportunity arose in 2004 at the age of 21 when she auditioned for the MTV series Making the Band 3 in Orlando, ultimately being selected to vie for a position in Combs' upcoming girl group. After the negotiated release from her contract with Yeah! Brother Records, she elevated her career by signing with Bad Boy Worldwide Entertainment. She beat out numerous contestants to secure herself a spot, along with Aubrey O'Day, Aundrea Fimbres, Wanita Woodgett (also known as "D. Woods"), and Shannon Bex.

The newly formed group became Danity Kane. The idea for the name came from one of Richard's drawings. An avid fan of manga, while Danity Kane was in the studio, Richard drew a female superhero which caught the attention of Combs. When asked what the character's name was, she replied, "Danity Kane". To Combs, this represented the girls of Making the Band 3. He then decided that it should be the name of the group. The name and story were first introduced during Danity Kane's Total Request Live appearance on June 14, 2006.

Richard has also remixed a song with London-based artist Cherri V, titled "Fast Car". The song has since become one of the most listened to songs on Cherri V's MySpace page.

Early in 2008, a song called "Phase" was leaked onto the Internet and featured Lil Wayne. Although it was buzzed as a Danity Kane track, only Richard's voice was featured on the song, which caused speculation that it was a solo demo. In July 2008, two new tracks were released onto the internet, one called "Rush Love" which featured Flo Rida, and another called "Strobe Light", written by Mary Brown and produced by Chad Beatz (Tastemaker Music). It is still unknown if this was part of a future solo endeavor.

During an MTV News break, it was stated that Richard was working on an untitled comic book. Richard also said in an interview that she would be releasing a soundtrack for the Danity Kane comic book, to be released in March 2009. Included would be the leaked track "Falls Away".

On January 27, 2009, Richard confirmed to MTV News in an interview that Danity Kane had completely split up. In the same interview, she said that she still considered herself a member of Danity Kane (along with Aundrea Fimbres), and had hopes that each girl would be willing to work as a group again.

On the April 16, 2009, episode of Making the Band, Combs revealed that he had released O'Day and Woods, along with Bex, from their contracts, and would be releasing Fimbres as well. He told Richard that she would stay on the label and that if there were any future plans for a new Danity Kane, she would be the only returning member. However, on the April 23, 2009, finale of the series, Combs stated that all five original members would be returning if he ever decides to reunite the group.

=== 2009–2011: Diddy-Dirty Money and The Prelude to a Tell Tale Heart ===
In 2009, Richard began working with Bad Boy Records, writing for artist Cassie Ventura and Combs himself. Soon after Danity Kane's breakup, Richard was featured in a commercial for the opposition of California's Prop 8. Richard became a member of the Diddy-Dirty Money collective, which includes Combs and singer-songwriter Kalenna Harper. She featured in Keri Hilson's video for "The Way You Love Me" as "Money". She is the first member of Danity Kane to have released professional music under a major label after their split, with the Dirty Money album.

During 2010, Richard started putting the finishing touches on her mixtape, The Prelude to A Tell Tale Heart. Before the full mix-tape release Richard released a few songs, including "Me Myself & Y", which she released as a promotional single on globalgrind.com. Others are "These Tears", a heavy ballad, and "Let Love In", another ballad with heavy vocal harmonies. The mixtape The Prelude to A Tell Tale Heart (alternate title: #ATellTaleHeart) was released on February 7, 2011, on her official website. It contains 15 tracks. It was called "the prelude to..." because there will also be an official debut studio album by Dawn Richard entitled A-Tell Tale Heart, which she has been working on for three years. She worked with Trendsetter (the producer) on a few tracks for that album.

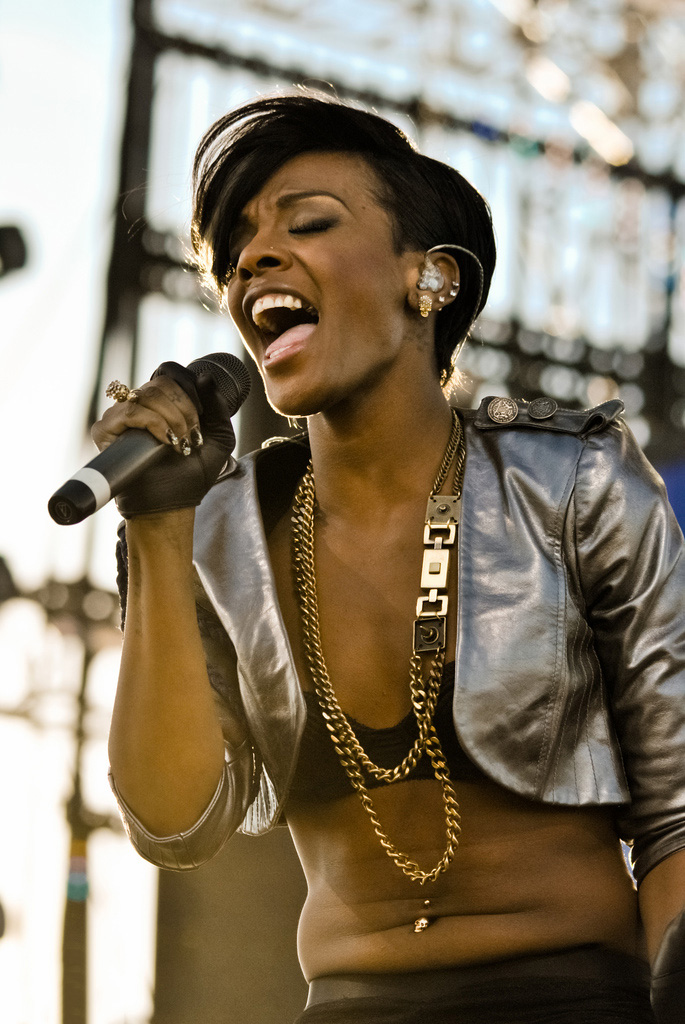
Richard performing in 2010

On June 19, 2011, a buzz track entitled "Stuck on Mad" was released to the public. followed by a release of a remix to Frank Ocean's "Novacane". The remix, which was co-written by songwriter Intyce, hit the internet on June 21, 2011, and reached over 5,000 downloads within a few hours.

=== 2012–2013: Armor On and GoldenHeart ===
Richard released the visual for her first promotional single "SMFU (Save Me From U)" on 106 & Park in January 2012. Other promotional singles such as "Fly, Change, and Black Lipstick" came after. She quickly followed with a leading single titled "Bombs". The video has been compared to Beyonce's "Run The World (Girls)" and Nicki Minaj's "Massive Attack". The video shows heavy choreography in a desert. After the success of "Bombs", Richard's next official single from Armor On was released: "Automatic", the most urban track from the EP. The video was released on June 18 and premiered on 106 & Park. The following music video was filmed in July 2012. Richard released three video trailers on YouTube for her singles "Faith" and "Wild N'Young", which were meshed into one music video released on August 29, 2012, as the final release from Armor On.

Richard announced that her major solo debut project will be a trilogy of albums entitled Goldenheart, BlackHeart, and RedemptionHeart. GoldenHeart was expected to be released on October 16, 2012. "SMFU (Save Me from U)" was released on the internet on October 31, 2011, and will on the first album. The video premiered on 106 & Park on January 5, 2012. Druski is the main producer on this entire project.

Richard is going for a progressive R&B sound.

In celebration of her one million Twitter followers, Richard introduced the set-up for her album GoldenHeart on July 17, 2012, with a track entitled "Pretty Wicked Things". "It's the story of the beautiful things in life that get ruined by the wicked," explained Richard. It was produced and co-written by Armor On collaborator Druski, and is available on iTunes.

Goldenheart was released on January 15, 2013, in stores and through online retailers. Originally intended for release in October 2012, Richard delayed the release after signing a distribution deal with independent company Altavoz Distribution, which would release physical copies to retailers, and provide a wider marketing reach. The album's lead single, "'86", was released as a digital download on September 26.

Goldenheart was released in the United States on January 15, 2013. Richard released the album independently, as she felt record labels were "taking a bit longer than we want". It debuted at number 137 on the Billboard 200, number 2 on the Top Heatseekers Albums, and number 10 on the Top R&B/Hip-Hop Albums. The album also reached the top of the iTunes Store's R&B chart, which prompted music retailer f.y.e. to preemptively release its physical CD.

Goldenheart received universal acclaim from music critics, who hailed Richard as one of the best new acts in pop and R&B.

=== 2013–2015: DK3 and Blackheart ===
Richard was scheduled to release the second installment in her album trilogy, BlackHeart, in October 2013, but announced that the album would be released after the Danity Kane project. On New Year's Day of 2014, the unreleased music video for "Riot/Northern Lights" was leaked online. The video was originally shelved in May 2013 after Richard and producer Drew Scott parted ways. The video received positive reviews as it continued where the "86" music video left off.

During the 2013 MTV VMAs pre-show, the four remaining members of Danity Kane announced that they were reuniting and returning on their own terms, without Diddy. Original group member D. Woods did not take part in the reunion. The group's first official reunion single, "Lemonade", was released on the Internet via SoundCloud. The single was produced by the Stereotypes, and features rapper Tyga over a production sampled from "Grindin'", the 2002 hit song by Clipse.

On May 16, 2014, the first night of their #DKNoFilter Tour after performing several songs with Danity Kane, Fimbres announced that she would be leaving the group at the end of their tour, and that O'Day, Bex, and Richard would be continuing on as a trio.

On August 4, 2014, while in a Los Angeles recording studio, a fight ensued in which Richard allegedly punched O'Day. After days of speculation, O'Day and Bex released a public statement announcing the group's second disbandment. Despite the group's break-up, their third album, DK3, was released on October 27, 2014.

On October 29, 2014, two days after DK3's release, Richard debuted the music video for her lead single "Blow" to Vevo. Along with the video, she announced the new release date for her second album Blackheart, January 15, 2015. "With the help of my long time creative/business partner, Kyle Cabrol, I was able to create something we are proud of," said Dawn. "This project is very special to me. We set out to redefine the term 'independent' and really push the limits on what could be done. We are just two people but we act as a label that has an entire staff. Both of us are extremely excited to share this art with the hearts."

=== 2015–present: Redemption, New Breed, Second Line ===
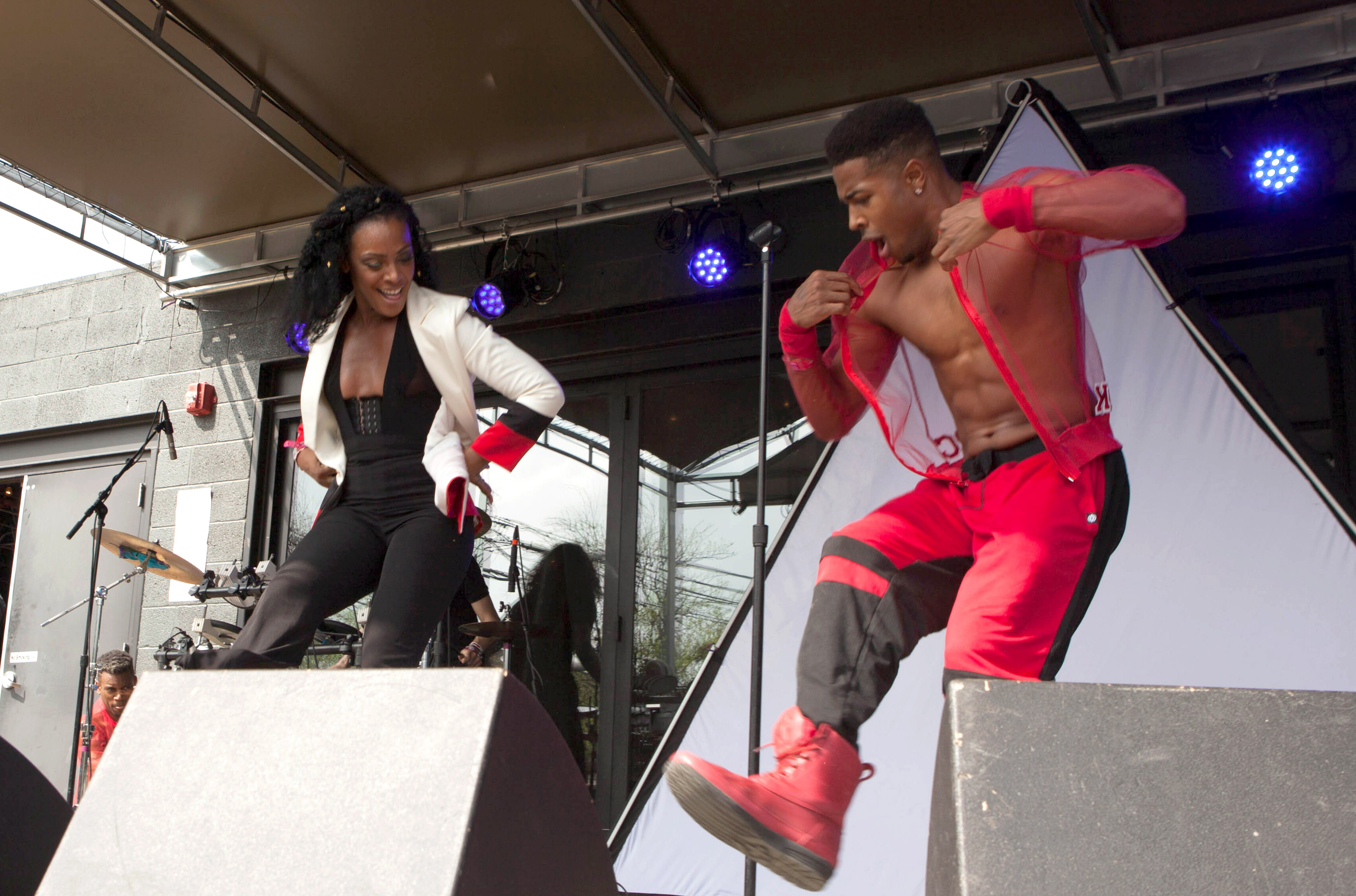
Richard performing in 2016

On September 28, 2015, Richard debuted "Dance", the first single from The Red Era. About the single she said: "I wanted to create a vibrant atmosphere, The Red Era is about moving on, redeeming yourself, and finding redemption. The official music video premiered on October 5, 2015, mashed with "Billie Jean" from Blackheart.

On January 29, 2016 "Not Above That" was released through UK label Local Action. On March 12, 2016, Dawn started her Redemption Live show tour and performed the first ever YouTube live 360 performance.

On August 10, 2016, Richard made a cameo appearance on Season 2 of the TV series Rosewood with Morris Chestnut and Gabrielle Dennis.

On September 15, 2016, Richard began filming the lead role, Joyce, in the 2017 movie Kinky, written by Jean-Claude Lamarre and starring Robert Ri'chard, Gary Dourdan and Vivica A. Fox.

On November 10, 2016 Redemption, Richard's fourth album, was made available to stream exclusively on NPR one week ahead of its release. The album was officially released on November 18, 2016.

Richard provided guest vocals on the song "Cool Your Heart" from Dirty Projectors' self-titled album, which was released February 21, 2017.

On January 25, 2019, Richard released her 5th solo album, New Breed. In September 2020 according to Deadline Hollywood, represented by Shakir Entertainment in New York City, Richard joined the cast of the Indie thriller Issac alongside Dove Cameron and RJ Mitte.

On April 30, 2021, Richard released her sixth solo album, Second Line: An Electro Revival. The album received generally favorable reviews. Mark Richardson wrote for the Wall Street Journal that the album "just might be her best", and in Paste Max Freedman wrote that "Richard largely makes up for her retreading with some of her sharpest hooks to date." The Spencer Zahn collaboration Pigments followed in 2022 and the EP The Architect came out in 2023. A further collaboration with Zahn, Quiet in a World Full of Noise, was announced in 2024.

== Personal life ==
Richard has been vegan since 2013. She posed naked for one PETA ad campaign promoting the lifestyle, and appeared in another protesting the use of leather.

Richard is Catholic.

In September 2024, Richard filed a lawsuit against former label boss Sean Combs for sexual abuse. in May 2025, she testified against Combs and said she witnessed Combs' abuse of Cassie Ventura.

=== Relationships ===
Danity Kane, Day26, and Donnie J. Klang were featured on the second season of Making the Band 4. The series showed the two groups doing performances and living together, and the relationships between members of the bands. The series showed Richard's relationship with Day26's Qwanell Mosley grow, and the two entering into a romantic relationship. The two broke up after a five-year relationship. Richard said it was Mosley's infidelity that broke them up in a radio interview for Sway in the Morning.

== Other ventures ==
=== Fashion ===
In 2013 Richard partnered with Coco & Breezy to release her own line of sunglasses to accompany her debut album. In 2014 she launched a capsule collection of women's shoes via Lust for Life, and a new addition of shades to accompany the Blackheart album release. In 2016 Richard released a limited edition sterling silver and red USB necklace to accompany the trilogy finale REDEMPTION.

=== Adult Swim ===
Richard began working with Adult Swim during summer 2016 as a content creator, recording several Adult Swim singles. In July 2020 she announced a partnership with Adult Swim as a creative consultant, seeking out black animators and artists to create content for the channel.

== Discography ==
Studio albums

- Been a While (2005)
- Goldenheart (2013)
- Blackheart (2015)
- Redemption (2016)
- New Breed (2019)
- Second Line (2021)
- Pigments (with Spencer Zahn) (2022)
- Quiet in a World Full of Noise (with Spencer Zahn) (2024)
- Creole Culture (2026)

== Filmography ==
Film roles
Year	Title	Role	Notes
2010	Perfect Combination	Dawn	
2010	Diddy: Dirty Money – The Final Days	Herself	Documentary film
2016	Izzie's Way Home	Ginger / Marcie / Carmel	Voice
2018	Kinky	Dr. Joyce Carmichael	Also as associate producer
2018	5 Weddings	Lydia Duniyar	
2021	Issac	Agent Riley	

Television roles
Year	Title	Role	Notes
2005–06	Making the Band 3	Herself – Winner	18 episodes
2007–09	Making the Band 4	Herself	30 episodes
2016	Rosewood	Girl Singer	Episode: "Eddie & the Empire State of Mind"
2017	The Tonight Show Starring Jimmy Fallon	Herself / Musical Guest	Episode: "Tina Fey/Alessandro Nivola/Dirty Projectors feat. DAWN"
2018	Insecure	Girl Singing	Episode: "Better-Like"

Music video roles
Year	Title	Role
2009	"Blame It"	Jamie Foxx
