= List of Dancing with the Stars (American TV series) episodes (2010–2015) =

Dancing with the Stars is an American reality dance competition television series. It is the American version of the British contest program Strictly Come Dancing and is part of its international franchise. The series pairs celebrities with professional dancers to perform primarily ballroom and Latin routines.

The first season premiered on June 1, 2005 as part of the summer 2005 primetime scheduling cycle. As of December 2, 2025, 514 episodes of Dancing with the Stars have aired, currently in its thirty-fifth season.

== Series overview ==
Season	Contestants	Episodes	Originally released		Winners	Runners-up
Season	Contestants	Episodes	First released	Last released	Winners	Runners-up
1	6	8	June 1, 2005	September 22, 2005	Kelly Monaco & Alec Mazo	John O'Hurley & Charlotte Jørgensen
2	10	16	January 5, 2006	February 24, 2006	Drew Lachey & Cheryl Burke	Jerry Rice & Anna Trebunskaya
3	11	20	September 12, 2006	November 15, 2006	Emmitt Smith & Cheryl Burke	Mario Lopez & Karina Smirnoff
4	11	19	March 19, 2007	May 22, 2007	Apolo Anton Ohno & Julianne Hough	Joey Fatone & Kym Johnson
5	12	21	September 24, 2007	November 27, 2007	Hélio Castroneves & Julianne Hough	Mel B & Maksim Chmerkovskiy
6	12	20	March 17, 2008	May 20, 2008	Kristi Yamaguchi & Mark Ballas	Jason Taylor & Edyta Śliwińska
7	13	21	September 22, 2008	November 25, 2008	Brooke Burke & Derek Hough	Warren Sapp & Kym Johnson
8	13	21	March 9, 2009	May 19, 2009	Shawn Johnson & Mark Ballas	Gilles Marini & Cheryl Burke
9	16	21	September 21, 2009	November 24, 2009	Donny Osmond & Kym Johnson	Mýa & Dmitry Chaplin
10	11	19	March 22, 2010	May 25, 2010	Nicole Scherzinger & Derek Hough	Evan Lysacek & Anna Trebunskaya
11	12	20	September 20, 2010	November 23, 2010	Jennifer Grey & Derek Hough	Kyle Massey & Lacey Schwimmer
12	11	19	March 21, 2011	May 24, 2011	Hines Ward & Kym Johnson	Kirstie Alley & Maksim Chmerkovskiy
13	12	20	September 19, 2011	November 22, 2011	J. R. Martinez & Karina Smirnoff	Rob Kardashian & Cheryl Burke
14	12	19	March 19, 2012	May 22, 2012	Donald Driver & Peta Murgatroyd	Katherine Jenkins & Mark Ballas
15	13	19	September 24, 2012	November 27, 2012	Melissa Rycroft & Tony Dovolani	Shawn Johnson & Derek Hough
16	12	20	March 18, 2013	May 21, 2013	Kellie Pickler & Derek Hough	Zendaya & Valentin Chmerkovskiy
17	12	12	September 16, 2013	November 26, 2013	Amber Riley & Derek Hough	Corbin Bleu & Karina Smirnoff
18	12	12	March 17, 2014	May 20, 2014	Meryl Davis & Maksim Chmerkovskiy	Amy Purdy & Derek Hough
19	13	15	September 15, 2014	November 25, 2014	Alfonso Ribeiro & Witney Carson	Sadie Robertson & Mark Ballas
20	12	14	March 16, 2015	May 19, 2015	Rumer Willis & Valentin Chmerkovskiy	Riker Lynch & Allison Holker
21	13	14	September 14, 2015	November 24, 2015	Bindi Irwin & Derek Hough	Nick Carter & Sharna Burgess
22	12	11	March 21, 2016	May 24, 2016	Nyle DiMarco & Peta Murgatroyd	Paige VanZant & Mark Ballas
23	13	15	September 12, 2016	November 22, 2016	Laurie Hernandez & Valentin Chmerkovskiy	James Hinchcliffe & Sharna Burgess
24	12	11	March 20, 2017	May 23, 2017	Rashad Jennings & Emma Slater	David Ross & Lindsay Arnold
25	13	12	September 18, 2017	November 21, 2017	Jordan Fisher & Lindsay Arnold	Lindsey Stirling & Mark Ballas
26	10	4	April 30, 2018	May 21, 2018	Adam Rippon & Jenna Johnson	Josh Norman & Sharna Burgess
27	13	11	September 24, 2018	November 19, 2018	Bobby Bones & Sharna Burgess	Milo Manheim & Witney Carson
28	12	11	September 16, 2019	November 25, 2019	Hannah Brown & Alan Bersten	Kel Mitchell & Witney Carson
29	15	11	September 14, 2020	November 23, 2020	Kaitlyn Bristowe & Artem Chigvintsev	Nev Schulman & Jenna Johnson
30	15	11	September 20, 2021	November 22, 2021	Iman Shumpert & Daniella Karagach	JoJo Siwa & Jenna Johnson
31	16	11	September 19, 2022	November 21, 2022	Charli D'Amelio & Mark Ballas	Gabby Windey & Val Chmerkovskiy
32	14	11	September 26, 2023	December 5, 2023	Xochitl Gomez & Val Chmerkovskiy	Jason Mraz & Daniella Karagach
33	13	10	September 17, 2024	November 26, 2024	Joey Graziadei & Jenna Johnson	Ilona Maher & Alan Bersten
34	14	12	September 16, 2025	December 2, 2025 (Note: A holiday television special was aired following the November 25, 2025 season finale.)	Robert Irwin & Witney Carson	Alix Earle & Val Chmerkovskiy
35	TBA	11	September 15, 2026	TBA	TBA	TBA

== Episodes ==
=== Season 17 (2013) ===
No. overall	No. in season	Title	Rating (18–49)	Original release date	U.S. viewers (millions)
307	1	"First Dances"	3.10	September 16, 2013	16.04
308	2	"Latin Night"	2.30	September 23, 2013	13.57
309	3	"Hollywood Night"	2.00	September 30, 2013	13.10
310	4	"Week 4"	2.00	October 7, 2013	13.00
311	5	"Most Memorable Year Night"	2.10	October 14, 2013	12.99
312	6	"Switch-Up Challenge"	2.00	October 21, 2013	13.35
313	7	"Team Dance Night"	2.08	October 28, 2013	13.28
314	8	"Cher Night"	1.97	November 4, 2013	13.71
315	9	"Trio Night"	1.71	November 11, 2013	12.57
316	10	"Plugged/Unplugged Night"	2.00	November 18, 2013	13.80
317	11	"Finals: Night 1"	2.21	November 25, 2013	14.61
318	12	"Finals: Night 2"	2.41	November 26, 2013	14.75

=== Season 18 (2014) ===
No. overall	No. in season	Title	Rating (18–49)	Original release date	U.S. viewers (millions)
319	1	"First Dances"	2.56	March 17, 2014	15.44
320	2	"Celebrity's Pick Night"	2.30	March 24, 2014	14.49
321	3	"Most Memorable Year Night"	2.29	March 31, 2014	14.10
322	4	"Switch-Up Night"	2.17	April 7, 2014	14.47
323	5	"Disney Night"	2.33	April 14, 2014	14.78
324	6	"Party Anthems Night"	2.17	April 21, 2014	14.06
325	7	"Latin Night"	2.57	April 28, 2014	15.88
326	8	"Celebrity Dance Duels Night"	1.91	May 5, 2014	13.12
327	9	"American Icons Night"	2.28	May 12, 2014	14.36
328	10	"Finals: Night 1"	2.59	May 19, 2014	15.66
329	11	"Road to the Finals"	1.64	May 20, 2014	11.64
330	12	"Finals: Night 2"	2.40	May 20, 2014	15.07

=== Season 19 (2014) ===
No. overall	No. in season	Title	Rating (18–49)	Original release date	U.S. viewers (millions)
331	1	"Premiere Night"	2.40	September 15, 2014	13.64
332	2	"Premiere Night: Results"	2.20	September 16, 2014	12.68
333	3	"My Jam Monday"	2.00	September 22, 2014	12.13
334	4	"My Jam Monday: Results"	1.60	September 23, 2014	9.68
335	5	"Movie Night"	1.84	September 29, 2014	12.50
336	6	"Most Memorable Year"	1.80	October 6, 2014	12.32
337	7	"Switch-Up Night"	1.98	October 13, 2014	12.74
338	8	"Pitbull Joins the Party"	1.99	October 20, 2014	12.58
339	9	"Halloween Night"	1.89	October 27, 2014	12.62
340	10	"Dynamic Duos Night"	2.00	November 3, 2014	13.09
341	11	"America's Choice Night"	1.99	November 10, 2014	13.31
342	12	"Plugged/Unplugged Night"	2.30	November 11, 2014	14.30
343	13	"Finals: Night 1"	2.47	November 24, 2014	14.35
344	14	"The Road to the Finals"	1.90	November 25, 2014	11.31
345	15	"Finals: Night 2"	2.95	November 25, 2014	15.98

=== Season 20 (2015) ===
No. overall	No. in season	Title	Rating (18–49)	Original release date	U.S. viewers (millions)
346	1	"Season Premiere"	2.07	March 16, 2015	14.16
347	2	"My Jam Monday"	2.04	March 23, 2015	13.85
348	3	"Latin Night"	2.07	March 30, 2015	13.76
349	4	"Most Memorable Year"	2.03	April 6, 2015	13.75
350	5	"Disney Night"	2.17	April 13, 2015	13.89
351	6	"Spring Break Special"	2.07	April 30, 2015	13.41
352	7	"Eras Night"	2.00	April 27, 2015	13.22
353	8	"10th Anniversary Special"	1.70	April 28, 2015	10.07
354	9	"America's Choice"	1.90	May 4, 2015	12.43
355	10	"America's Choice: Results"	1.40	May 5, 2015	10.29
356	11	"Semifinals"	2.20	May 11, 2015	13.48
357	12	"Semifinals: Results"	1.50	May 12, 2015	10.16
358	13	"Finals: Night 1"	2.30	May 18, 2015	14.35
359	14	"Finals: Night 2"	2.30	May 19, 2015	13.49
