= List of Dancing with the Stars (American TV series) episodes (2005–2010) =

Dancing with the Stars is an American reality dance competition television series. It is the American version of the British contest program Strictly Come Dancing and is part of its international franchise. The series pairs celebrities with professional dancers to perform primarily ballroom and Latin routines.

The first season premiered on June 1, 2005 as part of the summer 2005 primetime scheduling cycle. As of December 2, 2025, 514 episodes of Dancing with the Stars have aired, currently in its thirty-fifth season.

== Series overview ==
Season	Contestants	Episodes	Originally released		Winners	Runners-up
Season	Contestants	Episodes	First released	Last released	Winners	Runners-up
1	6	8	June 1, 2005	September 22, 2005	Kelly Monaco & Alec Mazo	John O'Hurley & Charlotte Jørgensen
2	10	16	January 5, 2006	February 24, 2006	Drew Lachey & Cheryl Burke	Jerry Rice & Anna Trebunskaya
3	11	20	September 12, 2006	November 15, 2006	Emmitt Smith & Cheryl Burke	Mario Lopez & Karina Smirnoff
4	11	19	March 19, 2007	May 22, 2007	Apolo Anton Ohno & Julianne Hough	Joey Fatone & Kym Johnson
5	12	21	September 24, 2007	November 27, 2007	Hélio Castroneves & Julianne Hough	Mel B & Maksim Chmerkovskiy
6	12	20	March 17, 2008	May 20, 2008	Kristi Yamaguchi & Mark Ballas	Jason Taylor & Edyta Śliwińska
7	13	21	September 22, 2008	November 25, 2008	Brooke Burke & Derek Hough	Warren Sapp & Kym Johnson
8	13	21	March 9, 2009	May 19, 2009	Shawn Johnson & Mark Ballas	Gilles Marini & Cheryl Burke
9	16	21	September 21, 2009	November 24, 2009	Donny Osmond & Kym Johnson	Mýa & Dmitry Chaplin
10	11	19	March 22, 2010	May 25, 2010	Nicole Scherzinger & Derek Hough	Evan Lysacek & Anna Trebunskaya
11	12	20	September 20, 2010	November 23, 2010	Jennifer Grey & Derek Hough	Kyle Massey & Lacey Schwimmer
12	11	19	March 21, 2011	May 24, 2011	Hines Ward & Kym Johnson	Kirstie Alley & Maksim Chmerkovskiy
13	12	20	September 19, 2011	November 22, 2011	J. R. Martinez & Karina Smirnoff	Rob Kardashian & Cheryl Burke
14	12	19	March 19, 2012	May 22, 2012	Donald Driver & Peta Murgatroyd	Katherine Jenkins & Mark Ballas
15	13	19	September 24, 2012	November 27, 2012	Melissa Rycroft & Tony Dovolani	Shawn Johnson & Derek Hough
16	12	20	March 18, 2013	May 21, 2013	Kellie Pickler & Derek Hough	Zendaya & Valentin Chmerkovskiy
17	12	12	September 16, 2013	November 26, 2013	Amber Riley & Derek Hough	Corbin Bleu & Karina Smirnoff
18	12	12	March 17, 2014	May 20, 2014	Meryl Davis & Maksim Chmerkovskiy	Amy Purdy & Derek Hough
19	13	15	September 15, 2014	November 25, 2014	Alfonso Ribeiro & Witney Carson	Sadie Robertson & Mark Ballas
20	12	14	March 16, 2015	May 19, 2015	Rumer Willis & Valentin Chmerkovskiy	Riker Lynch & Allison Holker
21	13	14	September 14, 2015	November 24, 2015	Bindi Irwin & Derek Hough	Nick Carter & Sharna Burgess
22	12	11	March 21, 2016	May 24, 2016	Nyle DiMarco & Peta Murgatroyd	Paige VanZant & Mark Ballas
23	13	15	September 12, 2016	November 22, 2016	Laurie Hernandez & Valentin Chmerkovskiy	James Hinchcliffe & Sharna Burgess
24	12	11	March 20, 2017	May 23, 2017	Rashad Jennings & Emma Slater	David Ross & Lindsay Arnold
25	13	12	September 18, 2017	November 21, 2017	Jordan Fisher & Lindsay Arnold	Lindsey Stirling & Mark Ballas
26	10	4	April 30, 2018	May 21, 2018	Adam Rippon & Jenna Johnson	Josh Norman & Sharna Burgess
27	13	11	September 24, 2018	November 19, 2018	Bobby Bones & Sharna Burgess	Milo Manheim & Witney Carson
28	12	11	September 16, 2019	November 25, 2019	Hannah Brown & Alan Bersten	Kel Mitchell & Witney Carson
29	15	11	September 14, 2020	November 23, 2020	Kaitlyn Bristowe & Artem Chigvintsev	Nev Schulman & Jenna Johnson
30	15	11	September 20, 2021	November 22, 2021	Iman Shumpert & Daniella Karagach	JoJo Siwa & Jenna Johnson
31	16	11	September 19, 2022	November 21, 2022	Charli D'Amelio & Mark Ballas	Gabby Windey & Val Chmerkovskiy
32	14	11	September 26, 2023	December 5, 2023	Xochitl Gomez & Val Chmerkovskiy	Jason Mraz & Daniella Karagach
33	13	10	September 17, 2024	November 26, 2024	Joey Graziadei & Jenna Johnson	Ilona Maher & Alan Bersten
34	14	12	September 16, 2025	December 2, 2025 (Note: A holiday television special was aired following the November 25, 2025 season finale.)	Robert Irwin & Witney Carson	Alix Earle & Val Chmerkovskiy
35	TBA	TBA	September 15, 2026	TBA	TBA	TBA

== Episodes ==
=== Season 1 (2005) ===
No. overall	No. in season	Title	Rating (18–49)	Original release date	U.S. viewers (millions)
1	1	"Round One"	4.30	June 1, 2005	13.48
2	2	"Round Two"	4.80	June 8, 2005	15.09
3	3	"Round Three"	4.80	June 15, 2005	15.67
4	4	"Round Four"	4.40	June 22, 2005	15.52
5	5	"Round Five"	5.60	June 29, 2005	18.59
6	6	"Round Six"	6.70	July 6, 2005	22.36
7	7	"Dance Off"	2.80	September 20, 2005	10.91
8	8	"Dance Off: Results"	2.60	September 22, 2005	10.48

=== Season 2 (2006) ===
No. overall	No. in season	Title	Rating (18–49)	Original release date	U.S. viewers (millions)
9	1	"Round 1"	4.8/12	January 5, 2006	17.46
10	2	"Round 1 Results"	3.0/9	January 6, 2006	12.88
11	3	"Round 2"	4.6/12	January 12, 2006	17.36
12	4	"Round 2 Results"	3.3/10	January 13, 2006	13.66
13	5	"Round 3"	5.2/14	January 19, 2006	18.98
14	6	"Round 3 Results"	3.8/12	January 20, 2006	15.44
15	7	"Round 4"	5.1/13	January 26, 2006	19.37
16	8	"Round 4 Results"	3.5/11	January 27, 2006	14.00
17	9	"Round 5"	4.9/12	February 2, 2006	18.83
18	10	"Round 5 Results"	3.9/12	February 3, 2006	16.04
19	11	"Round 6"	5.5/14	February 9, 2006	19.96
20	12	"Round 6 Results"	3.8/11	February 10, 2006	14.59
21	13	"Semifinals"	5.4/13	February 16, 2006	19.26
22	14	"Semifinals Results"	4.0/12	February 17, 2006	15.75
23	15	"Finals"	4.9/12	February 23, 2006	17.70
24	16	"Finals Results"	8.6/19	February 26, 2006	27.23

=== Season 3 (2006) ===
No. overall	No. in season	Title	Rating (18–49)	Original release date	U.S. viewers (millions)
25	1	"Round 1"	5.7/15	September 12, 2006	20.22
26	2	"Round 1 Results"	4.1/13	September 13, 2006	16.30
27	3	"Round 2"	5.2/14	September 19, 2006	17.92
28	4	"Round 2 Results"	3.7/11	September 20, 2006	14.79
29	5	"Round 3"	5.2/14	September 26, 2006	117.91
30	6	"Round 3 Results"	4.1/12	September 27, 2006	15.81
31	7	"Round 4"	5.2/14	October 3, 2006	18.38
32	8	"Round 4 Results"	4.5/13	October 4, 2006	17.49
33	9	"Round 5"	5.6/15	October 10, 2006	20.10
34	10	"Round 5 Results"	4.6/13	October 11, 2006	18.21
35	11	"Round 6"	6.0/16	October 17, 2006	21.25
36	12	"Round 6 Results"	5.0/14	October 18, 2006	19.23
37	13	"Round 7"	5.4/14	October 24, 2006	20.69
38	14	"Round 7 Results"	5.1/14	October 25, 2006	20.02
39	15	"Round 8"	5.3/15	October 31, 2006	20.51
40	16	"Round 8 Results"	4.8/13	November 1, 2006	19.22
41	17	"Semifinals"	5.9/14	November 7, 2006	21.98
42	18	"Semifinals Results"	5.2/14	November 8, 2006	20.68
43	19	"Finals"	7.5/20	November 14, 2006	26.80
44	20	"Finals Results"	7.1/19	November 15, 2006	27.51

=== Season 4 (2007) ===
No. overall	No. in season	Title	Original release date	U.S. viewers (millions)
45	1	"Round 1"	March 19, 2007	21.80
46	2	"Round 2"	March 26, 2007	20.42
47	3	"Round 2 Results"	March 27, 2007	17.93
48	4	"Round 3"	April 2, 2007	18.24
49	5	"Round 3 Results"	April 3, 2007	14.99
50	6	"Round 4"	April 9, 2007	18.84
51	7	"Round 4 Results"	April 10, 2007	17.32
52	8	"Round 5"	April 16, 2007	18.87
53	9	"Round 5 Results"	April 17, 2007	16.54
54	10	"Round 6"	April 23, 2007	18.87
55	11	"Round 6 Results"	April 24, 2007	16.56
56	12	"Round 7"	April 30, 2007	18.97
57	13	"Round 7 Results"	May 1, 2007	16.26
58	14	"Round 8"	May 7, 2007	19.44
59	15	"Round 8 Results"	May 8, 2007	16.86
60	16	"Round 9"	May 14, 2007	19.58
61	17	"Round 9 Results"	April 15, 2007	18.44
62	18	"Round 10"	April 21, 2007	20.19
63	19	"Round 10 Results"	April 22, 2007	22.96

=== Season 5 (2007) ===
No. overall	No. in season	Title	Original release date	U.S. viewers (millions)
64	1	"Round 1: Part 1"	September 24, 2007	21.25
65	2	"Round 1: Part 2"	September 25, 2007	18.50
66	3	"Round Results"	September 26, 2007	16.81
67	4	"Round 2"	October 1, 2007	20.21
68	5	"Round 2 Results"	October 2, 2007	18.50
69	6	"Round 3"	October 8, 2007	19.62
70	7	"Round 3 Results"	October 9, 2007	16.36
71	8	"Round 4"	October 15, 2007	19.40
72	9	"Round 4 Results"	October 16, 2007	17.30
73	10	"Round 5"	October 22, 2007	21.37
74	11	"Round 5 Results"	October 23, 2007	18.06
75	12	"Round 6"	October 29, 2007	21.43
76	13	"Round 6 Results"	October 30, 2007	18.86
77	14	"Round 7"	November 5, 2007	20.47
78	15	"Round 7 Results"	November 6, 2007	17.06
79	16	"Round 8"	November 12, 2007	21.81
80	17	"Round 8 Results"	November 13, 2007	17.59
81	18	"Round 9"	November 19, 2007	22.85
82	19	"Round 9 Results"	November 20, 2007	20.95
83	20	"Finale"	November 26, 2007	24.23
84	21	"Finale Results"	November 27, 2007	24.87

=== Season 6 (2008) ===
No. overall	No. in season	Title	Rating (18–49)	Original release date	U.S. viewers (millions)
85	1	"Round 1: Part 1"	5.6/15	March 17, 2008	21.15
86	2	"Round 1: Part 2"	4.1/10	March 18, 2008	17.02
87	3	"Round 1: Part 3"	5.1/13	March 24, 2008	20.51
88	4	"Round Results"	3.9/9	March 25, 2008	17.49
89	5	"Round 2"	5.1/13	March 31, 2008	20.56
90	6	"Round 2 Results"	4.0/10	April 1, 2008	17.28
91	7	"Round 3"	4.9/13	April 7, 2008	19.68
92	8	"Round 3 Results"	3.6/9	April 8, 2008	17.02
93	9	"Round 4"	4.1/11	April 14, 2008	17.20
94	10	"Round 4 Results"	3.6/9	April 15, 2008	15.42
95	11	"Round 5"	4.3/11	April 21, 2008	18.04
96	12	"Round 5 Results"	4.2/10	April 22, 2008	17.97
97	13	"Round 6"	4.5/11	April 28, 2008	18.22
98	14	"Round 6 Results"	4.1/10	April 29, 2008	17.06
99	15	"Round 7"	4.3/12	May 5, 2008	18.10
100	16	"Round 7 Results"	4.4/11	May 6, 2008	18.38
101	17	"Round 8"	4.2/11	May 12, 2008	18.47
102	18	"Round 8 Results"	4.1/10	May 13, 2008	16.99
103	19	"Round 9"	4.4/13	May 19, 2008	19.22
104	20	"Round 9 Results"	5.4/14	May 20, 2008	20.12
