= List of Dancing with the Stars (American TV series) episodes (2015–2021) =

Dancing with the Stars is an American reality dance competition television series. It is the American version of the British contest program Strictly Come Dancing and is part of its international franchise. The series pairs celebrities with professional dancers to perform primarily ballroom and Latin routines.

The first season premiered on June 1, 2005 as part of the summer 2005 primetime scheduling cycle. As of December 2, 2025, 514 episodes of Dancing with the Stars have aired, currently in its thirty-fifth season.

== Series overview ==
Season	Contestants	Episodes	Originally released		Winners	Runners-up
Season	Contestants	Episodes	First released	Last released	Winners	Runners-up
1	6	8	June 1, 2005	September 22, 2005	Kelly Monaco & Alec Mazo	John O'Hurley & Charlotte Jørgensen
2	10	16	January 5, 2006	February 24, 2006	Drew Lachey & Cheryl Burke	Jerry Rice & Anna Trebunskaya
3	11	20	September 12, 2006	November 15, 2006	Emmitt Smith & Cheryl Burke	Mario Lopez & Karina Smirnoff
4	11	19	March 19, 2007	May 22, 2007	Apolo Anton Ohno & Julianne Hough	Joey Fatone & Kym Johnson
5	12	21	September 24, 2007	November 27, 2007	Hélio Castroneves & Julianne Hough	Mel B & Maksim Chmerkovskiy
6	12	20	March 17, 2008	May 20, 2008	Kristi Yamaguchi & Mark Ballas	Jason Taylor & Edyta Śliwińska
7	13	21	September 22, 2008	November 25, 2008	Brooke Burke & Derek Hough	Warren Sapp & Kym Johnson
8	13	21	March 9, 2009	May 19, 2009	Shawn Johnson & Mark Ballas	Gilles Marini & Cheryl Burke
9	16	21	September 21, 2009	November 24, 2009	Donny Osmond & Kym Johnson	Mýa & Dmitry Chaplin
10	11	19	March 22, 2010	May 25, 2010	Nicole Scherzinger & Derek Hough	Evan Lysacek & Anna Trebunskaya
11	12	20	September 20, 2010	November 23, 2010	Jennifer Grey & Derek Hough	Kyle Massey & Lacey Schwimmer
12	11	19	March 21, 2011	May 24, 2011	Hines Ward & Kym Johnson	Kirstie Alley & Maksim Chmerkovskiy
13	12	20	September 19, 2011	November 22, 2011	J. R. Martinez & Karina Smirnoff	Rob Kardashian & Cheryl Burke
14	12	19	March 19, 2012	May 22, 2012	Donald Driver & Peta Murgatroyd	Katherine Jenkins & Mark Ballas
15	13	19	September 24, 2012	November 27, 2012	Melissa Rycroft & Tony Dovolani	Shawn Johnson & Derek Hough
16	12	20	March 18, 2013	May 21, 2013	Kellie Pickler & Derek Hough	Zendaya & Valentin Chmerkovskiy
17	12	12	September 16, 2013	November 26, 2013	Amber Riley & Derek Hough	Corbin Bleu & Karina Smirnoff
18	12	12	March 17, 2014	May 20, 2014	Meryl Davis & Maksim Chmerkovskiy	Amy Purdy & Derek Hough
19	13	15	September 15, 2014	November 25, 2014	Alfonso Ribeiro & Witney Carson	Sadie Robertson & Mark Ballas
20	12	14	March 16, 2015	May 19, 2015	Rumer Willis & Valentin Chmerkovskiy	Riker Lynch & Allison Holker
21	13	14	September 14, 2015	November 24, 2015	Bindi Irwin & Derek Hough	Nick Carter & Sharna Burgess
22	12	11	March 21, 2016	May 24, 2016	Nyle DiMarco & Peta Murgatroyd	Paige VanZant & Mark Ballas
23	13	15	September 12, 2016	November 22, 2016	Laurie Hernandez & Valentin Chmerkovskiy	James Hinchcliffe & Sharna Burgess
24	12	11	March 20, 2017	May 23, 2017	Rashad Jennings & Emma Slater	David Ross & Lindsay Arnold
25	13	12	September 18, 2017	November 21, 2017	Jordan Fisher & Lindsay Arnold	Lindsey Stirling & Mark Ballas
26	10	4	April 30, 2018	May 21, 2018	Adam Rippon & Jenna Johnson	Josh Norman & Sharna Burgess
27	13	11	September 24, 2018	November 19, 2018	Bobby Bones & Sharna Burgess	Milo Manheim & Witney Carson
28	12	11	September 16, 2019	November 25, 2019	Hannah Brown & Alan Bersten	Kel Mitchell & Witney Carson
29	15	11	September 14, 2020	November 23, 2020	Kaitlyn Bristowe & Artem Chigvintsev	Nev Schulman & Jenna Johnson
30	15	11	September 20, 2021	November 22, 2021	Iman Shumpert & Daniella Karagach	JoJo Siwa & Jenna Johnson
31	16	11	September 19, 2022	November 21, 2022	Charli D'Amelio & Mark Ballas	Gabby Windey & Val Chmerkovskiy
32	14	11	September 26, 2023	December 5, 2023	Xochitl Gomez & Val Chmerkovskiy	Jason Mraz & Daniella Karagach
33	13	10	September 17, 2024	November 26, 2024	Joey Graziadei & Jenna Johnson	Ilona Maher & Alan Bersten
34	14	12	September 16, 2025	December 2, 2025 (Note: A holiday television special was aired following the November 25, 2025 season finale.)	Robert Irwin & Witney Carson	Alix Earle & Val Chmerkovskiy
35	TBA	11	September 15, 2026	TBA	TBA	TBA

== Episodes ==
=== Season 21 (2015) ===
No. overall	No. in season	Title	Rating (18–49)	Original release date	U.S. viewers (millions)
360	1	"Premiere"	2.14	September 14, 2015	13.21
361	2	"First Dances" (Clip Show)"	1.10	September 15, 2015	5.77
362	3	"Hometown Glory: Night 1"	1.77	September 21, 2015	11.46
363	4	"Hometown Glory: Night 2"	1.50	September 22, 2015	9.58
364	5	"TV Night"	1.63	September 28, 2015	11.04
365	6	"Most Memorable Year"	1.75	October 5, 2015	11.82
366	7	"Switch-Up Night"	1.67	October 12, 2015	11.64
367	8	"Famous Dances Night"	1.93	October 19, 2015	12.50
368	9	"Halloween Night"	1.80	October 26, 2015	11.86
369	10	"Icons Night"	1.85	November 2, 2015	12.09
370	11	"Showstoppers Night"	2.00	November 9, 2015	12.63
371	12	"Semifinals"	1.80	November 16, 2015	12.35
372	13	"Finals: Night 1"	2.11	November 23, 2015	13.29
373	14	"Finals: Night 2"	2.37	November 24, 2015	13.49

=== Season 22 (2016) ===
No. overall	No. in season	Title	Rating (18–49)	Original release date	U.S. viewers (millions)
374	1	"First Dances"	1.82	March 21, 2016	12.46
375	2	"Latin Night"	1.71	March 28, 2016	11.97
376	3	"Most Memorable Year Night"	1.75	April 4, 2016	11.97
377	4	"Disney Night"	1.99	April 11, 2016	12.51
378	5	"America's Switch-up"	1.58	April 18, 2016	10.95
379	6	"Famous Dances Night"	1.80	April 25, 2016	11.75
380	7	"Icons Night"	1.79	May 2, 2016	11.81
381	8	"Team-Up Challenge"	1.73	May 9, 2016	11.33
382	9	"Semifinals"	1.73	May 16, 2016	11.64
383	10	"Finals: Night 1"	1.92	May 23, 2016	12.34
384	11	"Finals: Night 2"	1.58	May 24, 2016	10.49

=== Season 23 (2016) ===
No. overall	No. in season	Title	Rating (18–49)	Original release date	U.S. viewers (millions)
385	1	"First Dances"	2.10	September 12, 2016	12.19
386	2	"TV Night"	1.71	September 19, 2016	10.71
387	3	"TV Night: Results"	1.50	September 20, 2016	8.60
388	4	"Face-off Night"	1.79	September 26, 2016	10.83
389	5	"Face-off Night: Results"	1.34	September 27, 2016	8.06
390	6	"Cirque du Soleil Night"	1.70	October 3, 2016	10.73
391	7	"Cirque du Soleil Night: Results"	1.44	October 4, 2016	9.12
392	8	"Most Memorable Year"	1.61	October 10, 2016	10.43
393	9	"Latin Night"	1.58	October 17, 2016	10.55
394	10	"Eras Night"	1.63	October 24, 2016	11.03
395	11	"Halloween Night"	1.48	October 31, 2016	10.39
396	12	"Showstoppers Night"	1.58	November 7, 2016	10.84
397	13	"Semifinals"	1.66	November 14, 2016	11.34
398	14	"Finals: Night 1"	1.82	November 21, 2016	11.97
399	15	"Finals: Night 2"	1.78	November 22, 2016	10.97

=== Season 24 (2017) ===
No. overall	No. in season	Title	Rating (18–49)	Original release date	U.S. viewers (millions)
400	1	"First Dances/400th Episode Week"	2.07	March 20, 2017	12.09
401	2	"First Elimination"	1.68	March 27, 2017	11.12
402	3	"Vegas Night"	1.55	April 3, 2017	10.48
403	4	"Most Memorable Year Night"	1.56	April 10, 2017	10.31
404	5	"Disney Night"	1.77	April 17, 2017	11.18
405	6	"Boy Bands vs. Girl Groups Night"	1.64	April 24, 2017	10.35
406	7	"A Night at the Movies"	1.61	May 1, 2017	10.31
407	8	"Quarterfinals"	1.50	May 8, 2017	9.95
408	9	"Semifinals"	1.46	May 15, 2017	10.07
409	10	"Finals: Night 1"	1.79	May 22, 2017	10.54
410	11	"Finals: Night 2"	1.35	May 23, 2017	8.91

=== Season 25 (2017) ===
No. overall	No. in season	Title	Rating (18–49)	Original release date	U.S. viewers (millions)
411	1	"First Dances"	1.63	September 18, 2017	10.71
412	2	"Ballroom"	1.35	September 25, 2017	8.67
413	3	"Latin"	1.17	September 26, 2017	7.22
414	4	"Guilty Pleasures Night"	1.43	October 2, 2017	9.06
415	5	"Most Memorable Year Night"	1.30	October 9, 2017	9.25
416	6	"Disney Night"	1.45	October 16, 2017	9.57
417	7	"A Night at the Movies"	1.27	October 23, 2017	9.15
418	8	"Halloween Night"	1.45	October 30, 2017	9.93
419	9	"Quarterfinals"	1.20	November 6, 2017	9.30
420	10	"Semifinals"	1.45	November 13, 2017	9.88
421	11	"Finals: Night 1"	1.41	November 20, 2017	10.08
422	12	"Finals: Night 2"	1.33	November 21, 2017	9.20

=== Season 26 (2018) ===
No. overall	No. in season	Title	Rating (18–49)	Original release date	U.S. viewers (millions)
423	1	"First Dances"	1.10	April 30, 2018	8.48
424	2	"Team Dance Night"	1.00	May 7, 2018	7.73
425	3	"MVP Night (Semifinals)"	1.00	May 14, 2018	7.68
426	4	"Finale"	1.10	May 21, 2018	8.77

=== Season 27 (2018) ===
No. overall	No. in season	Title	Rating (18–49)	Original release date	U.S. viewers (millions)
427	1	"Premiere Night"	1.00	September 24, 2018	7.68
428	2	"Night 2"	0.89	September 25, 2018	6.55
429	3	"New York City"	0.85	October 1, 2018	7.06
430	4	"Las Vegas"	0.77	October 2, 2018	6.15
431	5	"Most Memorable Year Night"	0.98	October 8, 2018	7.22
432	6	"Trio Night"	0.92	October 15, 2018	6.89
433	7	"Disney Night"	0.96	October 22, 2018	7.25
434	8	"Halloween Night"	0.95	October 29, 2018	7.25
435	9	"Country Night"	0.90	November 5, 2018	7.10
436	10	"Semifinals"	0.90	November 12, 2018	7.29
437	11	"Finals"	1.11	November 19, 2018	7.90

=== Season 28 (2019) ===
No. overall	No. in season	Title	Rating (18–49)	Original release date	U.S. viewers (millions)
438	1	"First Dances"	1.03	September 16, 2019	8.07
439	2	"First Elimination"	0.77	September 23, 2019	6.40
440	3	"Disney Night"	0.80	September 30, 2019	6.58
441	4	"Top 13"	0.80	October 7, 2019	6.68
442	5	"'80s Night"	0.91	October 14, 2019	6.61
443	6	"Top 11"	0.73	October 21, 2019	6.28
444	7	"Villains Night"	0.89	October 28, 2019	6.40
445	8	"Double Elimination Night"	0.78	November 4, 2019	6.20
446	9	"Icons Night"	0.90	November 11, 2019	6.75
447	10	"Semifinals"	0.79	November 18, 2019	6.63
448	11	"Finale"	1.07	November 25, 2019	7.79

=== Season 29 (2020) ===
No. overall	No. in season	Title	Rating (18–49)	Original release date	U.S. viewers (millions)
449	1	"First Dances"	1.34	September 14, 2020	8.12
450	2	"First Elimination"	1.08	September 22, 2020	6.09
451	3	"Disney Night"	1.10	September 28, 2020	6.87
452	4	"Top 13"	0.89	October 5, 2020	5.84
453	5	"'80s Night"	0.91	October 12, 2020	6.26
454	6	"Top 11"	0.83	October 19, 2020	5.75
455	7	"Villains Night"	0.81	October 26, 2020	5.48
456	8	"Double Elimination Night"	0.80	November 2, 2020	5.55
457	9	"Icons Night"	0.89	November 9, 2020	5.97
458	10	"Semifinals"	0.83	November 16, 2020	5.75
459	11	"Finale"	0.99	November 23, 2020	6.41

=== Season 30 (2021) ===
No. overall	No. in season	Title	Rating (18–49)	Original release date	U.S. viewers (millions)
460	1	"Premiere"	0.92	September 20, 2021	5.47
461	2	"First Elimination"	0.72	September 27, 2021	4.88
462	3	"Britney Night"	0.72	October 4, 2021	4.74
463	4	"Heroes Night"	0.69	October 11, 2021	4.62
464	5	"Villains Night"	0.66	October 12, 2021	4.32
465	6	"Grease Night"	0.77	October 18, 2021	5.02
466	7	"Horror Night"	0.71	October 25, 2021	4.86
467	8	"Queen Night"	0.70	November 1, 2021	4.79
468	9	"Janet Jackson Night"	0.71	November 8, 2021	4.72
469	10	"Semifinals"	0.67	November 15, 2021	4.80
470	11	"Finale"	0.88	November 22, 2021	5.64
