= Lisa Canning =

Virgin Islander actress

- Born: November 7, 1966 (age 59); Saint Thomas, U.S. Virgin Islands
- Occupations: TV/Radio personality Actress
- Years active: 1988–present

Lisa Canning (born November 7, 1966) is an American television and radio hostess and correspondent.

== Career ==
A native of Saint Thomas, U.S. Virgin Islands, Canning served, beginning in 1988, as music director at radio station WKDA in Los Angeles, and also hosted the station's nightly talk show, Campus Top Ten. Television credits include Entertainment Tonight from 1996 to 1999, co-host of "Knights and Warriors", the first season of Dancing with the Stars, Beyond With James Van Praagh (as the backstage interviewer/skeptic), and the Pax show Destination Stardom.

As an actress, Canning appeared in small roles in the feature films Scream, Intermission, and The Day After Tomorrow. She has acted on the television soap operas General Hospital and The Young and the Restless.

== Filmography ==
=== Film ===
Year	Title	Role	Notes
1996	Ladykiller	Leslie Vance	
1996	Scream	Reporter with Mask	
1997	An Alan Smithee Film: Burn Hollywood Burn	Herself	
2004	Intermission	Perfume Admirer	Short
2004	The Day After Tomorrow	L.A. Anchorwoman	
2004	One Life to Give	Gail	Short
2007	Waste Land	Dr. Abrams	Short
2009	The Red Canvas	Vanessa Fitzgerald	
2013	Santa Switch	Salesperson	TV movie
2015	In Memory	Doctor Jesiak	Short
2018	The Wrong Daughter	Nurse Hopewell	
2019	Bombshell	Harris Faulkner	

=== Television ===
Year	Title	Role	Notes
1989	A Different World	Girl	Episode: "No Means No"
1990	Parker Lewis Can't Lose	Andrea Russell	Episode: "Pilot"
1990	Match Game	Herself/Panelist	5 episodes
1991–1992	P.S.I. Luv U	Dori	Recurring cast
1992–1993	Knights and Warriors	Herself/host	TV series
1992–1994	Baywatch	Cookie Washington/Dawn	2 episodes: "Lifeguards Can't Jump" & "Rescue Bay"
1994	General Hospital	Meg Lawson #2	Regular Cast
1994	Weird Science	Lincoln	Episode: "Unplugged"
1996	Soul Train	Herself/Guest Host	Episode: "Brian Green/Silk"
1997	Veronica's Closet	Herself	Episode: "Veronica's Husband Won't Leave"
1999	Destination Stardom	Herself/host	TV series
2002	Beyond with James Van Praagh	Herself/co-host	TV series
2002–2003	Public Places, Private Spaces	Herself/host	TV series
2004	Charmed	Reporter #1	Episode: "Used Karma"
2004	Drake & Josh	Reporter #1	Episode: "Little Diva"
2004–2005	The Young and the Restless	Adrienne Markham	Regular Cast
2005	Dancing with the Stars	Herself	Co-Host: Season 1
2005	CSI: Miami	Lydia Johnson	Episode: "Felony Flight"
2005	CSI: NY	Lydia Johnson	Episode: "Manhattan Manhunt"
2006	The Bold and the Beautiful	Elizabeth	Episode: "Carmen's Karma"
2008	Terminator: The Sarah Connor Chronicles	News Anchor	Episode: "The Mousetrap"
2009	The Bold and the Beautiful	Chanel	2 episodes: "Episode #1.5632" & "Episode #1.5633"
2010	Important Things with Demetri Martin	Ladies Room Agent #1	Episode: "2"
2012	Scandal	Anchor	Episode: "The Trail"
2012	Hollywood Heights	Julie Calvin	Episode: "Escape"
2014	Parenthood	Real Estate Agent	Episode: "The Offer"
2014	Red Band Society	Therapy Leader	Episode: "There's No Place Like Homecoming"
2016	Mistresses	Prosecutor	Episode: "The New Girls"
2017	Vice Principals	Brenda Poutine	Episode: "Spring Break"
2017	Shameless	Aditi Harman	Episode: "Occupy Fiona"
2019–2020	The Bold and the Beautiful	Dr. Joyce Griffith	Regular Cast

Media offices
Preceded by New show	Co-Host of Dancing with the Stars; 2005	Succeeded by Samantha Harris
