= Dancing with the Stars (American TV series) season 2 =

Dancing with the Stars
- Season 2
- Promotional poster, featuring pro dancers Anna Trebunskaya and Jonathan Roberts
- Hosted by: Tom Bergeron; Samantha Harris
- Judges: Carrie Ann Inaba; Len Goodman; Bruno Tonioli
- Celebrity winner: Drew Lachey
- Professional winner: Cheryl Burke
- No. of episodes: 16

Release
- Original network: ABC
- Original release: January 5 – February 26, 2006

Season chronology
- ← Previous; Season 1 Next → Season 3

Season two of Dancing with the Stars premiered on January 5, 2006, on the ABC network.

This season expanded each episode from an hour to 90 minutes, and added an hour-long results show the following night.

On February 26, 98 Degrees singer Drew Lachey and Cheryl Burke were crowned the champions, while San Francisco 49ers wide receiver Jerry Rice and Anna Trebunskaya finished in second place, and WWE wrestler Stacy Keibler and Tony Dovolani finished third.

== Cast ==
=== Couples ===
This season featured ten celebrity contestants. Rapper Romeo was scheduled to appear this season, but suffered an injury before the first show and was replaced by his father, Master P. All of the professionals dancers from season one, with the exception of Alec Mazo and Charlotte Jørgensen, returned for season two.

| Celebrity | Notability | Professional partner | Status |
|---|---|---|---|
| Kenny Mayne | ESPN anchorman | Andrea Hale | Eliminated 1st on January 6, 2006 |
| Tatum O'Neal | Film actress | Nick Kosovich | Eliminated 2nd on January 13, 2006 |
| Giselle Fernandez | Television journalist | Jonathan Roberts | Eliminated 3rd on January 20, 2006 |
| Master P | Rapper & entrepreneur | Ashly DelGrosso | Eliminated 4th on January 27, 2006 |
| Tia Carrere | Actress & model | Maksim Chmerkovskiy | Eliminated 5th on February 3, 2006 |
| George Hamilton | Actor | Edyta Śliwińska | Eliminated 6th on February 10, 2006 |
| Lisa Rinna | Television actress & host | Louis van Amstel | Eliminated 7th on February 17, 2006 |
| Stacy Keibler | WWE Diva | Tony Dovolani | Third place on February 26, 2006 |
| Jerry Rice | NFL wide receiver | Anna Trebunskaya | Runners-up on February 26, 2006 |
| Drew Lachey | 98 Degrees singer | Cheryl Burke | Winners on February 26, 2006 |

Future appearances

Drew Lachey returned for the All-Stars season, where he was paired with Anna Trebunskaya.

=== Hosts and judges ===
Tom Bergeron returned as host, while Samantha Harris replaced Lisa Canning as co-host. Carrie Ann Inaba, Len Goodman, and Bruno Tonioli returned as judges.

== Episodes ==
| No. overall | No. in season | Title | Rating (18–49) | Original release date | U.S. viewers (millions) |
|---|---|---|---|---|---|
| 9 | 1 | "Round 1" | 4.8/12 | January 5, 2006 | 17.46 |
| 10 | 2 | "Round 1 Results" | 3.0/9 | January 6, 2006 | 12.88 |
| 11 | 3 | "Round 2" | 4.6/12 | January 12, 2006 | 17.36 |
| 12 | 4 | "Round 2 Results" | 3.3/10 | January 13, 2006 | 13.66 |
| 13 | 5 | "Round 3" | 5.2/14 | January 19, 2006 | 18.98 |
| 14 | 6 | "Round 3 Results" | 3.8/12 | January 20, 2006 | 15.44 |
| 15 | 7 | "Round 4" | 5.1/13 | January 26, 2006 | 19.37 |
| 16 | 8 | "Round 4 Results" | 3.5/11 | January 27, 2006 | 14.00 |
| 17 | 9 | "Round 5" | 4.9/12 | February 2, 2006 | 18.83 |
| 18 | 10 | "Round 5 Results" | 3.9/12 | February 3, 2006 | 16.04 |
| 19 | 11 | "Round 6" | 5.5/14 | February 9, 2006 | 19.96 |
| 20 | 12 | "Round 6 Results" | 3.8/11 | February 10, 2006 | 14.59 |
| 21 | 13 | "Semifinals" | 5.4/13 | February 16, 2006 | 19.26 |
| 22 | 14 | "Semifinals Results" | 4.0/12 | February 17, 2006 | 15.75 |
| 23 | 15 | "Finals" | 4.9/12 | February 23, 2006 | 17.70 |
| 24 | 16 | "Finals Results" | 8.6/19 | February 26, 2006 | 27.23 |

== Scoring chart ==
The highest score each week is indicated in bold green with a dagger (†), while the lowest score each week is indicated in italicized red with a double-dagger (‡).

Color key:

Winners
Runners-up
Third place
Bottom two
Eliminated

Dancing with the Stars (season 2) - Weekly scores
| Couple | Pl. | Week | | | | | | | |
| Couple | Pl. | 1 | 2 | 3 | 4 | 5 | 6 | 7 | 8 |
|---|---|---|---|---|---|---|---|---|---|
| Drew & Cheryl | 1st | **24**† | 27 | **27**† | **28**† | 27 | **30**† | 26+29=**55**† | 30+30+27=**87**† (Note: This couple finished in first place.) |
| Jerry & Anna | 2nd | 21 | 23 | 19 | 24 | 23 | 23‡ | 20+21=41‡ | 26+27+27=80‡ (Note: This couple finished in second place.) |
| Stacy & Tony | 3rd | 22 | **29**† | **27**† | 26 | **30**† | **30**† | 27+28=**55**† | 30+26+30=86 (Note: This couple finished in third place.) |
| Lisa & Louis | 4th | 19 | 20 | 25 | 26 | 25 | 27 (Note: This couple was in the bottom two, but was not eliminated.) | 26+27=53 (Note: This couple was eliminated.) | |
| George & Edyta | 5th | 18 | 22 | 22 | 21 | 24 | 23‡ | | |
| Tia & Maks | 6th | 20 | 22 | 26 | 25 | 22‡ | | | |
| Master P & Ashly | 7th | 12‡ | 16‡ | 14‡ | 8‡ | | | | |
| Giselle & Jonathan | 8th | 23 | 24 | 22 | | | | | |
| Tatum & Nick | 9th | 23 | 17 | | | | | | |
| Kenny & Andrea | 10th | 13 | | | | | | | |

Notes

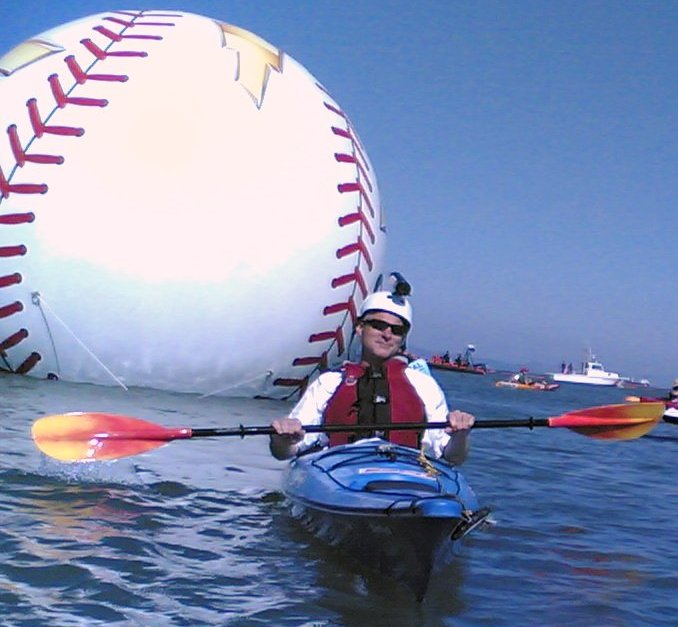
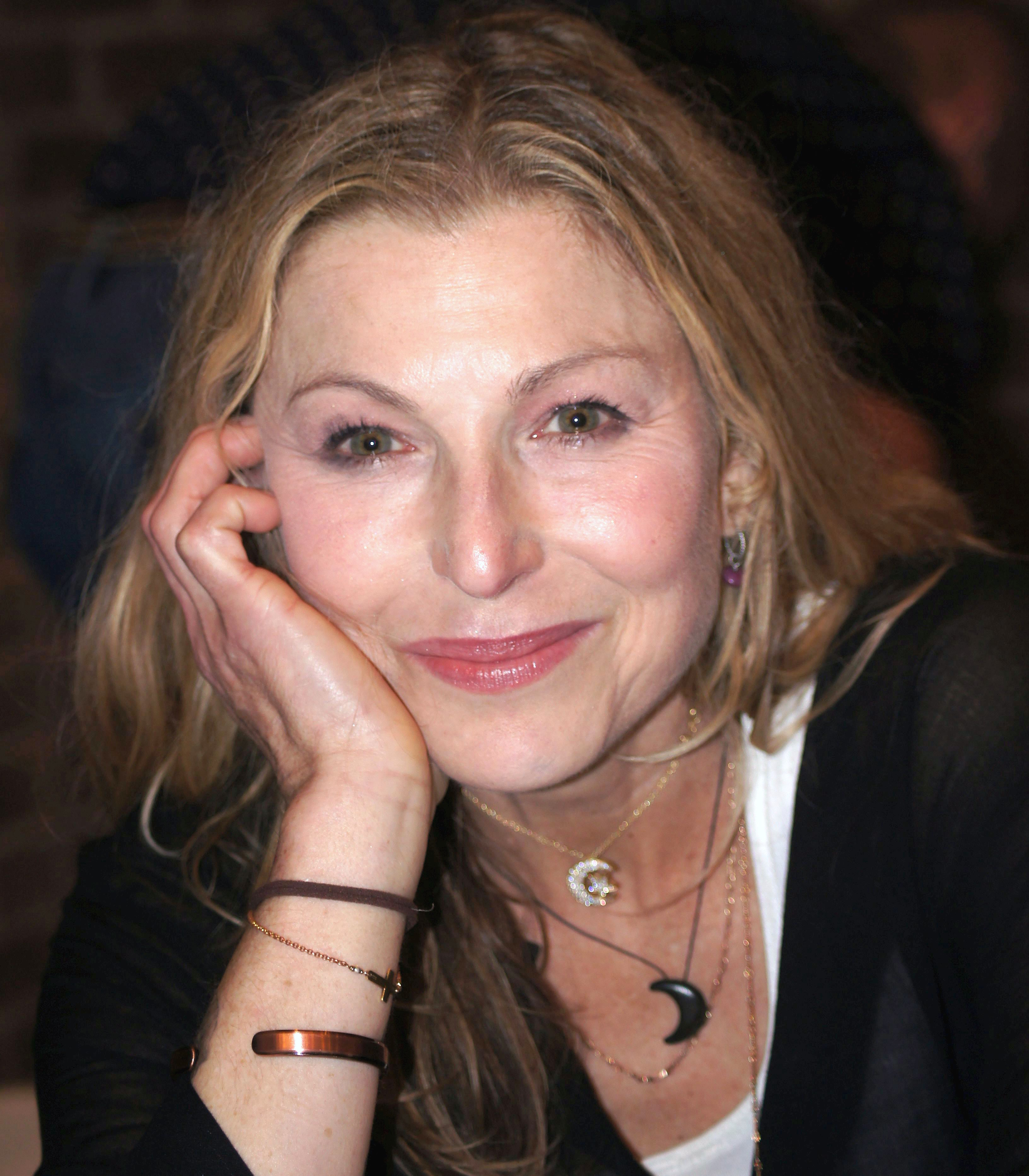
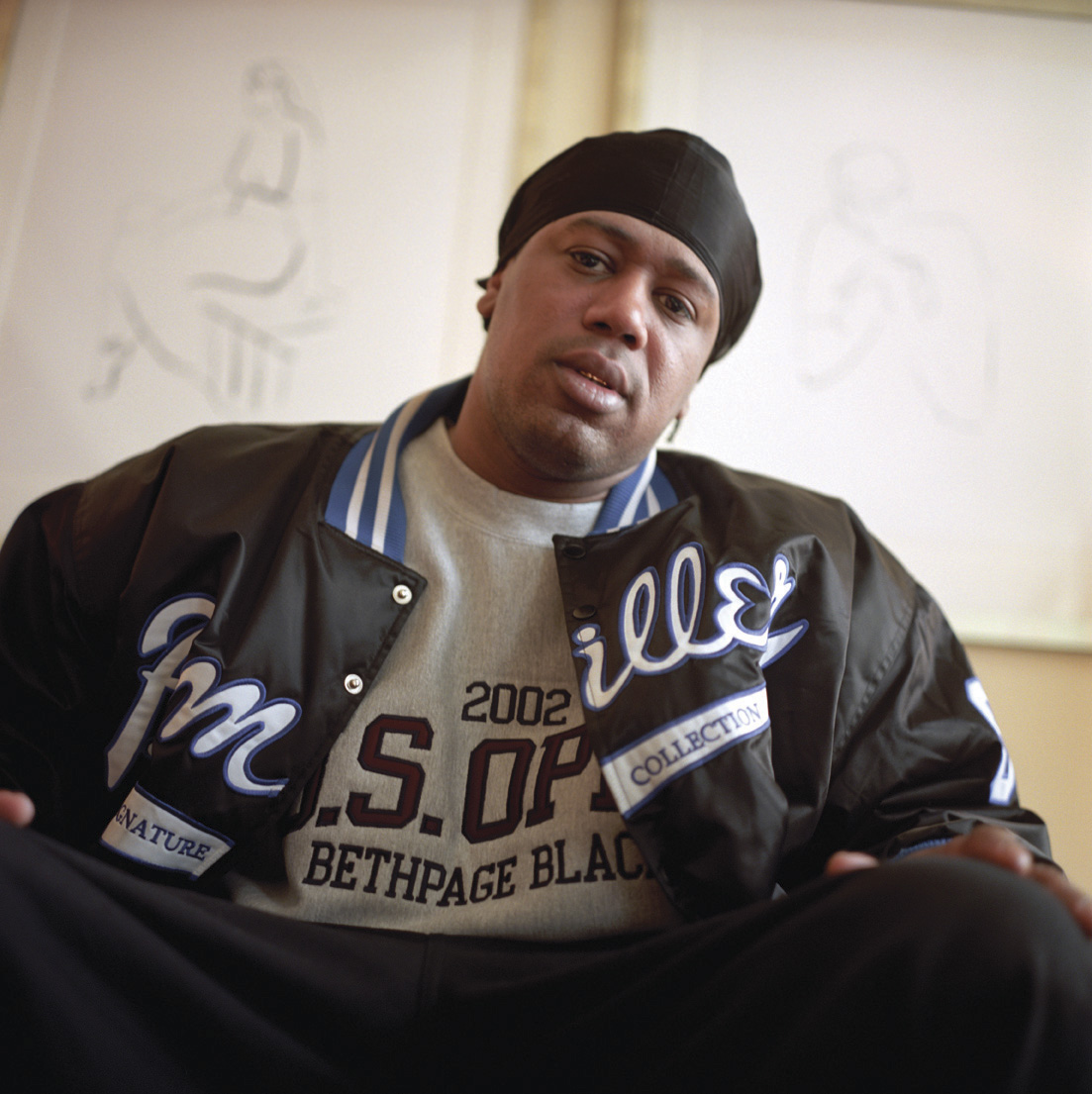
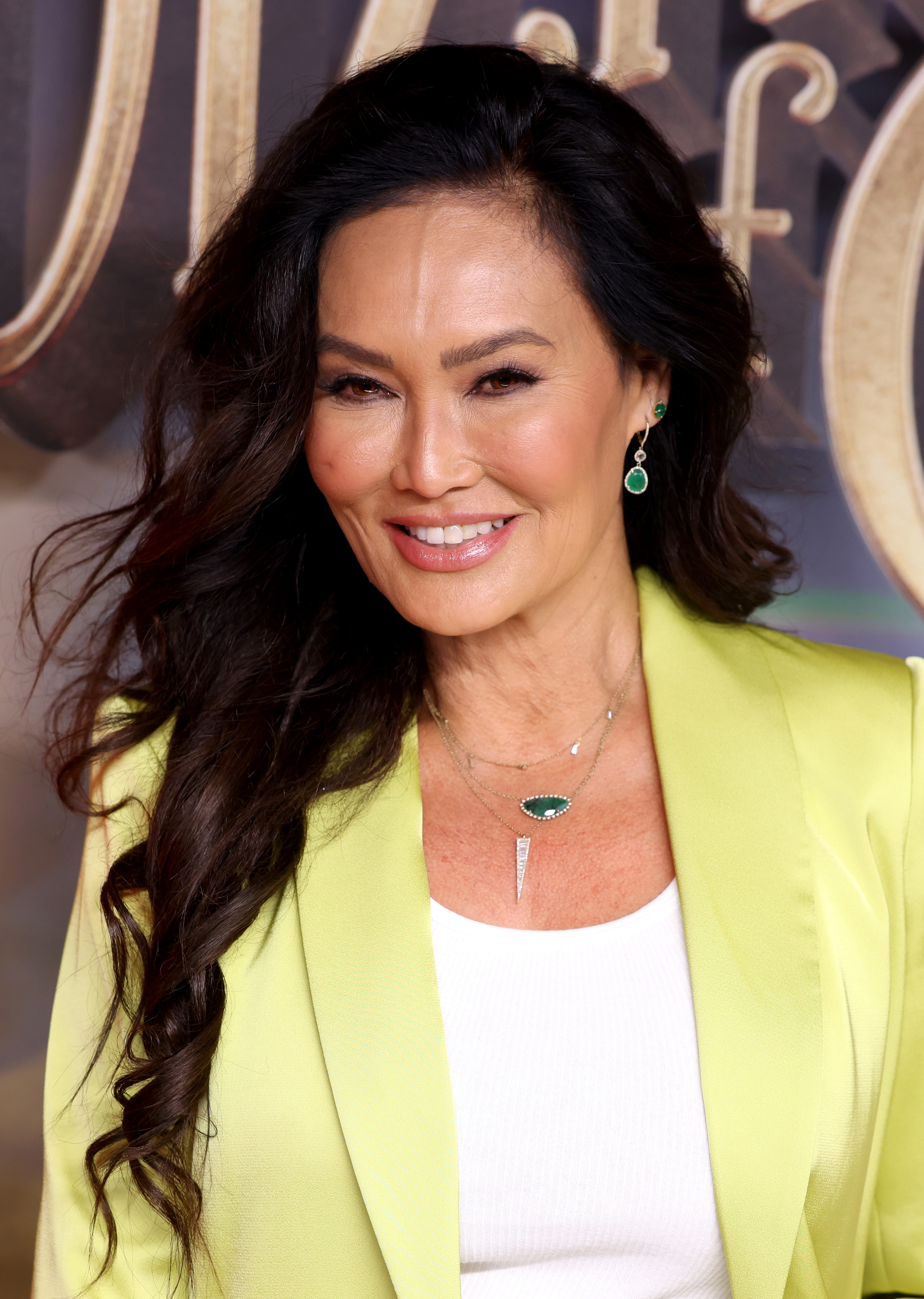
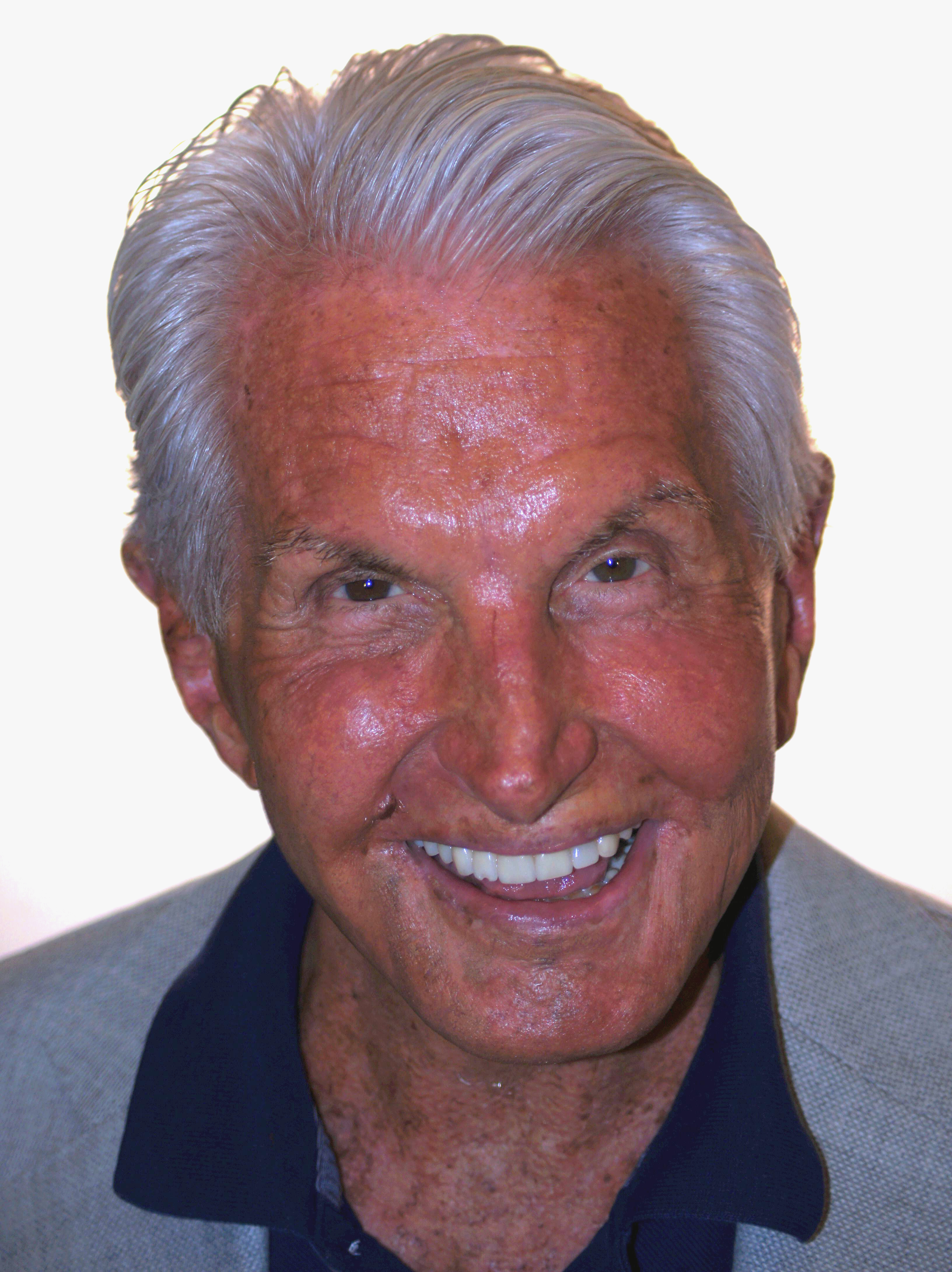
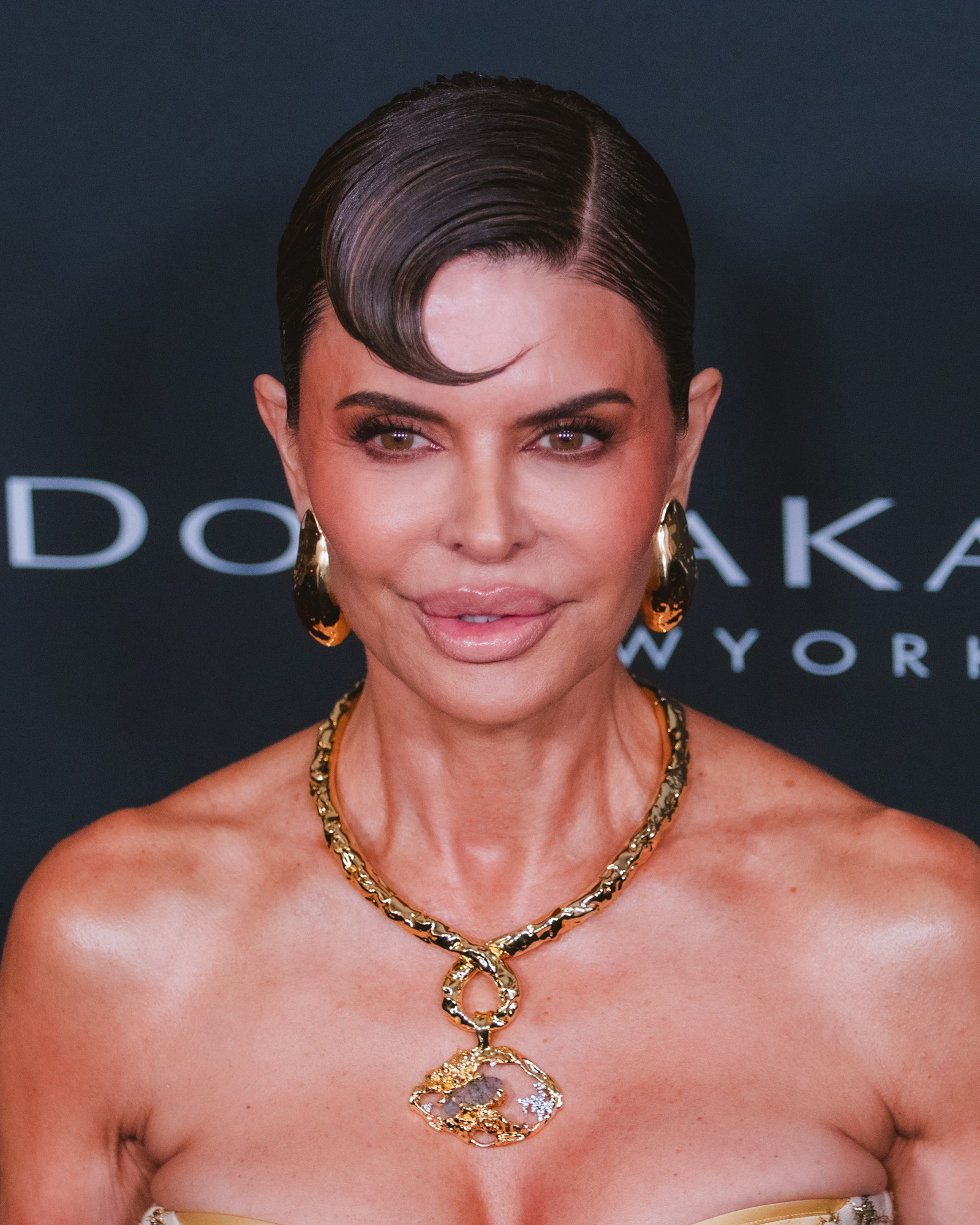
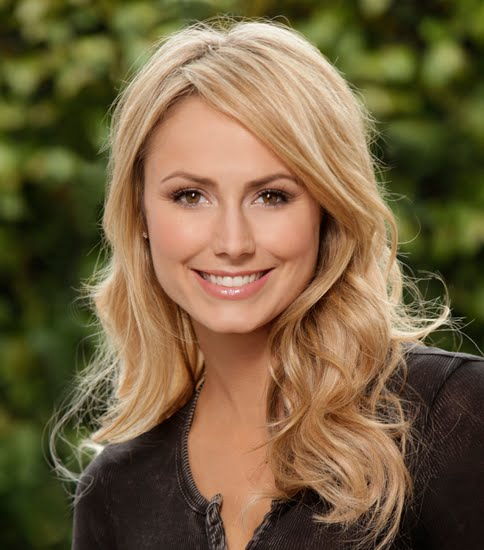
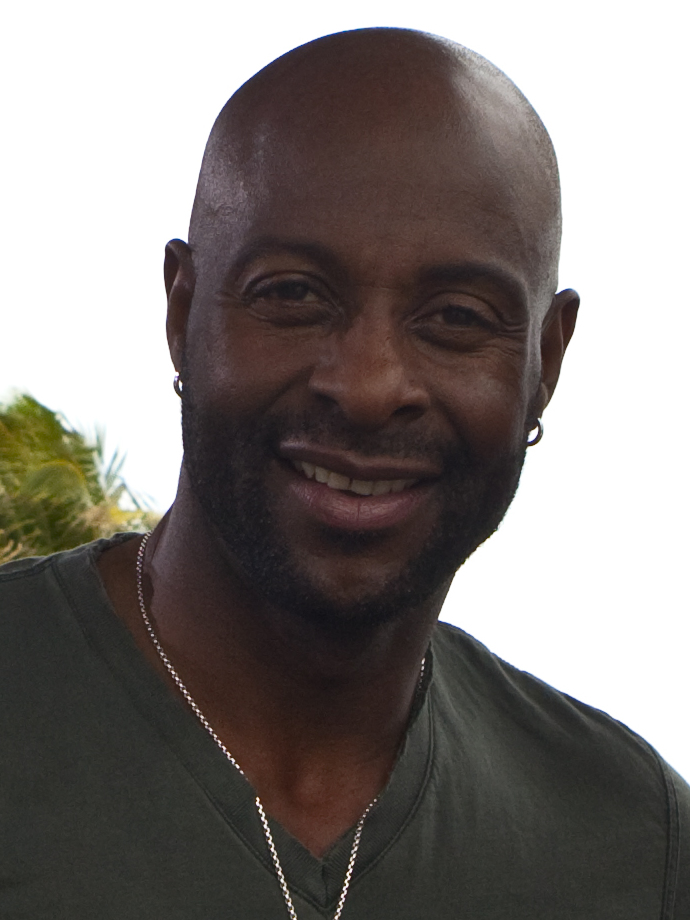
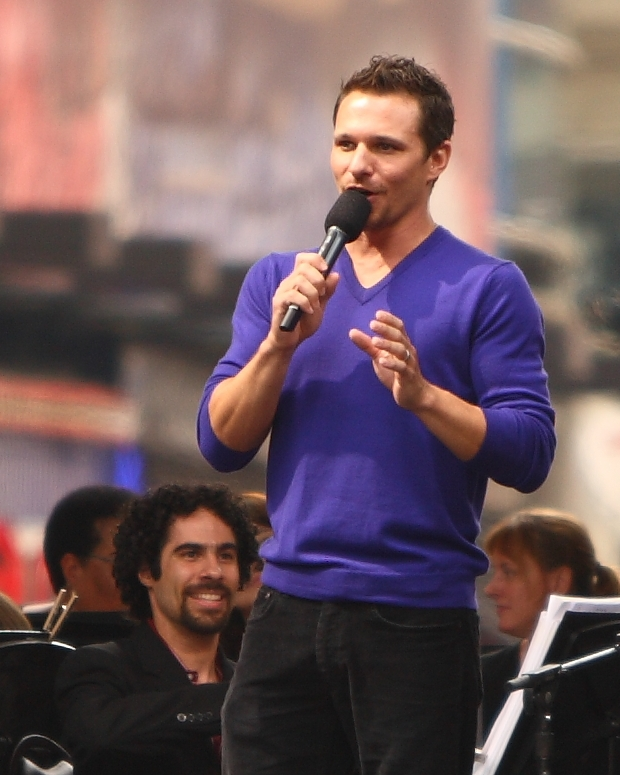
The celebrities who competed in the second season of Dancing With The Stars, pictured in order of elimination (L–R):

Kenny Mayne, Tatum O'Neal, Master P, Tia Carrere, George Hamilton, Lisa Rinna, Stacy Keibler, Jerry Rice, and Drew Lachey

Not pictured: Giselle Fernandez

== Weekly scores ==
Individual judges' scores in the charts below (given in parentheses) are listed in this order from left to right: Carrie Ann Inaba, Len Goodman, Bruno Tonioli.

=== Week 1 ===
Each couple performed either the cha-cha-cha or the waltz. Couples are listed in the order they performed.

| Couple | Scores | Dance | Music | Result |
|---|---|---|---|---|
| George & Edyta | 18 (7, 5, 6) | Cha-cha-cha | "Oye Como Va" — Santana | Safe |
| Lisa & Louis | 19 (5, 7, 7) | Waltz | "(You Make Me Feel Like) A Natural Woman" — Aretha Franklin | Safe |
| Kenny & Andrea | 13 (4, 5, 4) | Cha-cha-cha | "Hot Stuff" — Donna Summer | Eliminated |
| Stacy & Tony | 22 (8, 6, 8) | Waltz | "I Wonder Why" — Curtis Stigers | Safe |
| Drew & Cheryl | 24 (8, 8, 8) | Cha-cha-cha | "She Bangs" — Ricky Martin | Safe |
| Tia & Maks | 20 (6, 7, 7) | Waltz | "What a Wonderful World" — Louis Armstrong | Bottom two |
| Master P & Ashly | 12 (4, 4, 4) | Cha-cha-cha | "I Want You Back" — The Jackson 5 | Safe |
| Giselle & Jonathan | 23 (7, 8, 8) | Waltz | "I Never Loved a Man (The Way I Love You)" — Roxette | Safe |
| Jerry & Anna | 21 (7, 7, 7) | Cha-cha-cha | "I Like It" — The Blackout All-Stars | Safe |
| Tatum & Nick | 23 (7, 8, 8) | Waltz | "What the World Needs Now Is Love" — Jackie DeShannon | Safe |

=== Week 2 ===
Each couple performed either the quickstep or the rumba. Couples are listed in the order they performed.

| Couple | Scores | Dance | Music | Result |
|---|---|---|---|---|
| Lisa & Louis | 20 (6, 7, 7) | Rumba | "Your Song" — Elton John | Safe |
| Drew & Cheryl | 27 (9, 9, 9) | Quickstep | "Neutron Dance" — The Pointer Sisters | Safe |
| Tia & Maks | 22 (7, 8, 7) | Rumba | "Emotion" — Destiny's Child | Safe |
| George & Edyta | 22 (8, 7, 7) | Quickstep | "Top Hat, White Tie and Tails" — Fred Astaire | Safe |
| Tatum & Nick | 17 (5, 6, 6) | Rumba | "Careless Whisper" — Wham! | Eliminated |
| Jerry & Anna | 23 (7, 8, 8) | Quickstep | "If My Friends Could See Me Now" — Sweet Charity | Safe |
| Stacy & Tony | 29 (9, 10, 10) | Rumba | "I'm Like a Bird" — Nelly Furtado | Safe |
| Master P & Ashly | 16 (6, 5, 5) | Quickstep | "Zoot Suit Riot" — Cherry Poppin' Daddies | Bottom two |
| Giselle & Jonathan | 24 (8, 8, 8) | Rumba | "Take My Breath Away" — Berlin | Safe |

=== Week 3 ===
Each couple performed either the jive or the tango. Couples are listed in the order they performed.

| Couple | Scores | Dance | Music | Result |
|---|---|---|---|---|
| Jerry & Anna | 19 (7, 6, 6) | Jive | "Do You Love Me" — The Contours | Safe |
| Giselle & Jonathan | 22 (7, 8, 7) | Tango | "Hernando's Hideaway" — Victor Silvester | Eliminated |
| Drew & Cheryl | 27 (9, 9, 9) | Jive | "Crazy Little Thing Called Love" — Queen | Safe |
| George & Edyta | 22 (7, 7, 8) | Tango | "La Cumparsita" — Danny Malando | Bottom two |
| Lisa & Louis | 25 (8, 9, 8) | Jive | "Jailhouse Rock" — Elvis Presley | Safe |
| Stacy & Tony | 27 (9, 9, 9) | Tango | "Cell Block Tango" — from Chicago | Safe |
| Master P & Ashly | 14 (6, 4, 4) | Jive | "Saturday Night's Alright for Fighting" — Elton John | Safe |
| Tia & Maks | 26 (9, 8, 9) | Tango | "Por una Cabeza" — The Tango Project | Safe |

=== Week 4 ===
Each couple performed either the foxtrot or the paso doble. Couples are listed in the order they performed.

| Couple | Scores | Dance | Music | Result |
|---|---|---|---|---|
| George & Edyta | 21 (7, 7, 7) | Paso doble | "Matador Paso" — Andy Fortuna | Safe |
| Tia & Maks | 25 (9, 8, 8) | Foxtrot | "Dream a Little Dream of Me" — Mama Cass | Bottom two |
| Master P & Ashly | 8 (4, 2, 2) | Paso doble | "Don't Let Me Be Misunderstood" — The Animals | Eliminated |
| Stacy & Tony | 26 (8, 9, 9) | Foxtrot | "Cold, Cold Heart" — Norah Jones | Safe |
| Drew & Cheryl | 28 (9, 9, 10) | Paso doble | "Thriller" — Michael Jackson | Safe |
| Jerry & Anna | 24 (8, 8, 8) | Foxtrot | "Why Don't You Do Right" — Julie London | Safe |
| Lisa & Louis | 26 (9, 9, 8) | Paso doble | "The Final Countdown" — Europe | Safe |

=== Week 5 ===
Each couple performed the samba, as well as a group salsa. Couples are listed in the order they performed.

| Couple | Scores | Dance | Music | Result |
|---|---|---|---|---|
| Stacy & Tony | 30 (10, 10, 10) | Samba | "Bootylicious" — Destiny's Child | Safe |
| George & Edyta | 24 (8, 8, 8) | Samba | "Conga" — Miami Sound Machine | Bottom two |
| Lisa & Louis | 25 (7, 9, 9) | Samba | "Le Freak" — Chic | Safe |
| Tia & Maks | 22 (7, 7, 8) | Samba | "No More Tears (Enough Is Enough)" — Barbra Streisand & Donna Summer | Eliminated |
| Jerry & Anna | 23 (7, 8, 8) | Samba | "For Once in My Life" — Stevie Wonder | Safe |
| Drew & Cheryl | 27 (9, 9, 9) | Samba | "Dirrty" — Christina Aguilera | Safe |
| Drew & Cheryl George & Edyta Jerry & Anna Lisa & Louis Stacy & Tony Tia & Maksim | No scores received | Group; Salsa | "Rhythm Is Gonna Get You" — Gloria Estefan | |

=== Week 6 ===
Each couple performed one unlearned dance, as well as a group Viennese waltz. Couples are listed in the order they performed.

| Couple | Scores | Dance | Music | Result |
|---|---|---|---|---|
| Jerry & Anna | 23 (8, 7, 8) | Paso doble | "España cañí" — Erich Kunzel | Safe |
| Drew & Cheryl | 30 (10, 10, 10) | Tango | "Shut Up" — The Black Eyed Peas | Safe |
| George & Edyta | 23 (8, 7, 8) | Rumba | "Perhaps, Perhaps, Perhaps" — Doris Day | Eliminated |
| Lisa & Louis | 27 (9, 9, 9) | Quickstep | "9 to 5" — Dolly Parton | Bottom two |
| Stacy & Tony | 30 (10, 10, 10) | Jive | "Wake Me Up Before You Go-Go" — Wham! | Safe |
| Drew & Cheryl George & Edyta Jerry & Anna Lisa & Louis Stacy & Tony | No scores received | Group; Viennese waltz | "Fallin'" — Alicia Keys | |

=== Week 7 ===
Each couple performed two unlearned dances. Couples are listed in the order they performed.

| Couple | Scores | Dance | Music | Result |
|---|---|---|---|---|
| Stacy & Tony | 27 (9, 9, 9) | Quickstep | "You Can't Hurry Love" — Phil Collins | Safe |
| Stacy & Tony | 28 (9, 9, 10) | Cha-cha-cha | "Since U Been Gone" — Kelly Clarkson | Safe |
| Jerry & Anna | 20 (7, 7, 6) | Tango | "One Way or Another" — Blondie | Safe |
| Jerry & Anna | 21 (7, 7, 7) | Rumba | "Un-Break My Heart" — Toni Braxton | Safe |
| Lisa & Louis | 26 (8, 9, 9) | Foxtrot | "Fever" — Peggy Lee | Eliminated |
| Lisa & Louis | 27 (9, 9, 9) | Cha-cha-cha | "Material Girl" — Madonna | Eliminated |
| Drew & Cheryl | 26 (9, 9, 8) | Foxtrot | "It Had to Be You" — Harry Connick Jr. | Safe |
| Drew & Cheryl | 29 (10, 9, 10) | Rumba | "Total Eclipse of the Heart" — Bonnie Tyler | Safe |

=== Week 8 ===
Each couple performed three dances, one of which was their freestyle routine. Couples are listed in the order they performed.

| Couple | Scores | Dance | Music | Result |
|---|---|---|---|---|
| Jerry & Anna | 26 (9, 9, 8) | Foxtrot | "Why Don't You Do Right" — Julie London | Runners-up |
| Jerry & Anna | 27 (9, 9, 9) | Freestyle | "Celebration" — Kool & The Gang | Runners-up |
| Jerry & Anna | 27 (9, 9, 9) | Cha-cha-cha | "Think" — Aretha Franklin | Runners-up |
| Stacy & Tony | 30 (10, 10, 10) | Jive | "Wake Me Up Before You Go-Go" — Wham! | Third place |
| Stacy & Tony | 26 (8, 9, 9) | Freestyle | "Stayin' Alive" — Bee Gees | Third place |
| Stacy & Tony | 30 (10, 10, 10) | Samba | "Livin' la Vida Loca" — Ricky Martin | Third place |
| Drew & Cheryl | 30 (10, 10, 10) | Paso doble | "Thriller" — Michael Jackson | Winners |
| Drew & Cheryl | 30 (10, 10, 10) | Freestyle | "Save a Horse (Ride a Cowboy)" — Big & Rich | Winners |
| Drew & Cheryl | 27 (9, 9, 9) | Jive | "Hound Dog" — Elvis Presley | Winners |

== Dance chart ==
The couples performed the following each week:

- Week 1: One unlearned dance (cha-cha-cha or waltz)
- Week 2: One unlearned dance (quickstep or rumba)
- Week 3: One unlearned dance (jive or tango)
- Week 4: One unlearned dance (foxtrot or paso doble)
- Week 5: Samba & salsa group dance
- Week 6: One unlearned dance & Viennese waltz group dance
- Week 7: Two unlearned dances
- Week 8: Favorite dance, freestyle & one other dance

Color key:

No scores received

Dancing with the Stars (season 2) - Dance chart
| Couple | Week | | | | | | | | | | | | |
| Couple | 1 | 2 | 3 | 4 | 5 | | 6 | | 7 | | 8 | | |
|---|---|---|---|---|---|---|---|---|---|---|---|---|---|
| Drew & Cheryl | Cha-cha-cha | Quickstep | Jive | Paso doble | Samba | Group; Salsa (Note: No scores were received for this dance.) | Tango | Group; Viennese waltz | Foxtrot | Rumba | Paso doble | Freestyle | Jive |
| Jerry & Anna | Cha-cha-cha | Quickstep | Jive | Foxtrot | Samba | Group; Salsa | Paso doble | Group; Viennese waltz | Tango | Rumba | Foxtrot | Freestyle | Cha-cha-cha |
| Stacy & Tony | Waltz | Rumba | Tango | Foxtrot | Samba | Group; Salsa | Jive | Group; Viennese waltz | Quickstep | Cha-cha-cha | Jive | Freestyle | Samba |
| Lisa & Louis | Waltz | Rumba | Jive | Paso doble | Samba | Group; Salsa | Quickstep | Group; Viennese waltz | Foxtrot | Cha-cha-cha | | | |
| George & Edyta | Cha-cha-cha | Quickstep | Tango | Paso doble | Samba | Group; Salsa | Rumba | Group; Viennese waltz | | | | | |
| Tia & Maks | Waltz | Rumba | Tango | Foxtrot | Samba | Group; Salsa | | | | | | | |
| Master P & Ashly | Cha-cha-cha | Quickstep | Jive | Paso doble | | | | | | | | | |
| Giselle & Jonathan | Waltz | Rumba | Tango | | | | | | | | | | |
| Tatum & Nick | Waltz | Rumba | | | | | | | | | | | |
| Kenny & Andrea | Cha-cha-cha | | | | | | | | | | | | |
