= Edyta Śliwińska =

Polish professional ballroom dancer (born 1981)

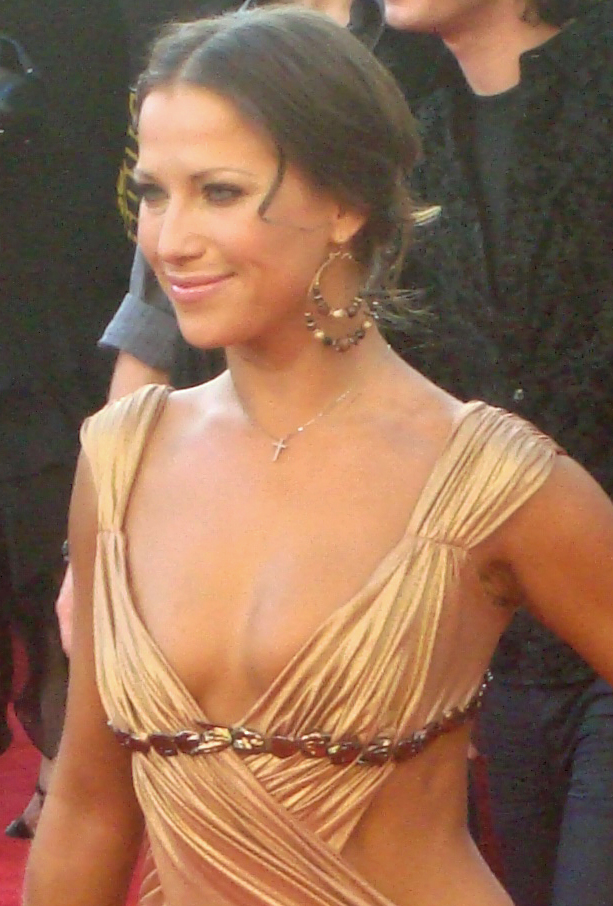
- Śliwińska at the 2009 American Music Awards
- Born: May 6, 1981 (age 45); Warsaw, Poland
- Occupation: Ballroom dancer
- Height: 5 ft 6 in (1.68 m)
- Spouse: Alec Mazo (m. 2007)
- Children: 2

Edyta Śliwińska (Polish pronunciation: [ɛˈdɨta ɕliˈvij̃ska]; born May 6, 1981) is a Polish-American professional ballroom dancer who is starring in the stage show Dance Temptation. She is best known for her appearances on the American version of the reality television series Dancing with the Stars, where she appeared on all of the first ten seasons of the show.

== Early life ==
Śliwińska was born in Warsaw, Poland, and comes from a working-class Polish background. She took her first dancing class at age 12.

== Dancing with the Stars ==
In the first season of Dancing with the Stars in June 2005, Śliwińska partnered boxing champion Evander Holyfield, with whom she placed 5th in the competition.

For the second season, she was paired with actor George Hamilton, and again came in 5th place.

With the third season, her partner was actor Joey Lawrence, and the couple achieved 3rd place. Śliwińska and Lawrence were part of the first performance tour of the show from December 19, 2006, to February 11, 2007.

For season 4, she originally had Vincent Pastore as her partner, but Pastore withdrew after a week of training, as he was unable to keep up with the hard pace of preparation. On March 2, John Ratzenberger was announced to be Pastore's replacement, giving Ratzenberger the least time of any celebrity to prepare for the series at the time. On May 1, 2007, Sliwinska and Ratzenberger became the sixth couple eliminated from the competition, with a finish of 6th place.

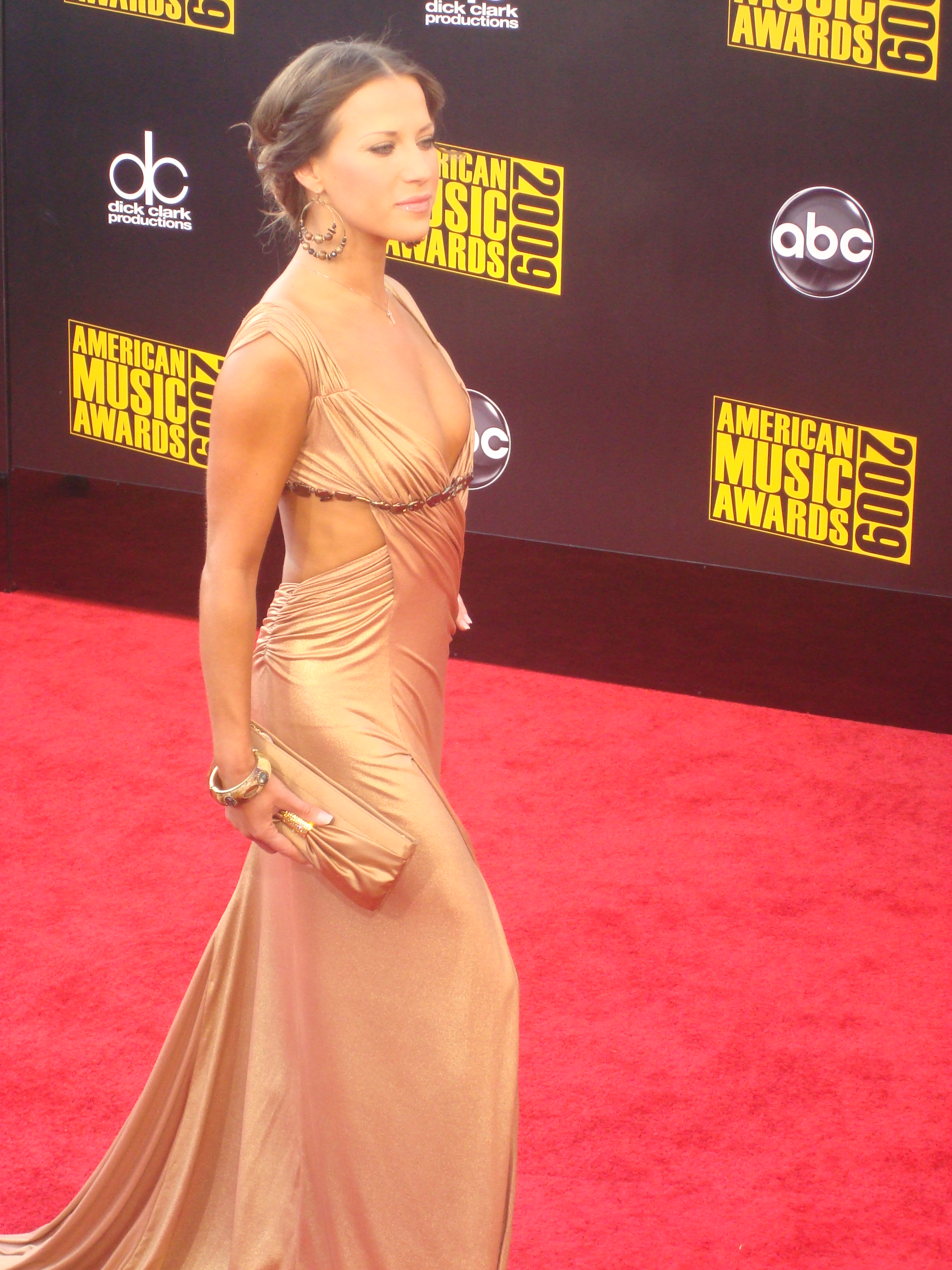
Śliwińska at 2009 American Music Awards.

In season 5, Śliwińska was partnered with soap opera actor Cameron Mathison. They became the eighth couple eliminated before the semi-finals, with a finish of 5th place for the third time.

In season 6, her partner was NFL player Jason Taylor. They won second place, giving Śliwińska her best finish to date.

In season 7, Śliwińska and her partner American Comedian and Roastmaster Jeffrey Ross were the first couple to be eliminated. They did not get their chance to show their Quickstep. During practice, Ross suffered an eye injury. Misty May-Treanor had suffered a leg injury in week three of the competition, and since she wanted to show America her Jive, Śliwińska danced it for her on the next night's result show. After week six, Śliwińska temporarily replaced Julianne Hough as Cody Linley's professional partner until Hough recovered from surgery scheduled on October 28, 2008.

In season 8, Śliwińska was paired with NFL player Lawrence Taylor. They were eliminated in the seventh week of the show on April 21, 2009, with the lowest judged score of 21 and came in 7th place.

For season 9, Śliwińska was paired with Ashley Hamilton, George Hamilton's son. They were eliminated first making Sliwinska the third professional to come in last more than once along with Alec Mazo (her husband), Jonathan Roberts, and Tristan MacManus.

For season 10, it was announced on March 2, 2010, that she would be partnered up with soap opera star Aiden Turner. They were eliminated in the fourth week of the competition and came in 9th place.

On March 2, 2016, it was announced that Śliwińska would return for season 22 after an eleven-season hiatus and is partnered with journalist Geraldo Rivera. The couple was the first to be eliminated on the second week of competition.

Season	Partner	Place	Average Score
1	Evander Holyfield	5th	15.00
2	George Hamilton	5th	21.67
3	Joey Lawrence	3rd	26.50
4	John Ratzenberger	6th	19.50
5	Cameron Mathison	5th	24.50
6	Jason Taylor	2nd	26.33
7	Jeffrey Ross	12th	12.00
8	Lawrence Taylor	7th	19.71
9	Ashley Hamilton	12th	15.00
10	Aiden Turner	9th	17.40
22	Geraldo Rivera	12th	13.00

=== Dancing with the Stars performances ===
==== Season 1 ====
With Evander Holyfield

Week #	Dance	Song	Judges' score			Total	Result
Week #	Dance	Song	Inaba	Goodman	Tonioli	Total	Result
1	Cha-cha-cha	"Respect" — Aretha Franklin	5	7	6	18	No Elimination
2	Quickstep	"It Don't Mean a Thing" — Duke Ellington	5	4	5	14	Safe
3	Jive	"Reet Petite" — Jackie Wilson	5	4	4	13	Eliminated

==== Season 2 ====
with George Hamilton

Week #	Dance	Song	Judges' score			Total	Result
Week #	Dance	Song	Inaba	Goodman	Tonioli	Total	Result
1	Cha-cha-cha	"Oye Como Va" — Santana	7	5	6	18	Safe
2	Quickstep	"Top Hat, White Tie and Tails" — Fred Astaire	8	7	7	22	Safe
3	Tango	"La Cumparsita" — Danny Malando	7	7	8	22	Bottom Two
4	Paso doble	"Matador Paso" — Andy Fortuna	7	7	7	21	Safe
5	Samba	"Conga" — Miami Sound Machine	8	8	8	24	Bottom Two
6	Rumba	"Perhaps, Perhaps, Perhaps" — Doris Day	8	7	8	23	Eliminated

==== Season 3 ====
with Joey Lawrence

Week #	Dance	Song	Judges' score			Total	Result
Week #	Dance	Song	Inaba	Goodman	Tonioli	Total	Result
1	Cha-cha-cha	"I Like The Way (You Move)" — Body Rockers	7	7	7	21	Safe
2	Quickstep	"I Got Rhythm" — Ella Fitzgerald	10	9	10	29	Safe
3	Jive	"Blue Suede Shoes" — Elvis Presley	8	6	8	22	Safe
4	Waltz	"Take It to the Limit" — The Eagles	9	9	9	27	Safe
5	Samba	"Freedom! '90" — George Michael	8	8	9	25	Safe
6	Rumba	"Father Figure" — George Michael	8	8	8	24	Bottom Two
7	Foxtrot	"Singin' in the Rain" — Gene Kelly	10	9	10	57 (29 + 28)	Safe
7	Mambo	"Mambo No. 5" — Lou Bega	9	9	10	57 (29 + 28)	Safe
8	Tango	"The Addams Family Theme" — from The Addams Family	10	9	9	54 (28 + 26	Safe
8	Paso doble	"Sympathy for the Devil" — The Rolling Stones	9	8	9	54 (28 + 26	Safe
9	Quickstep	"42nd Street" — Lee Roy Reams	9	10	10	59 (29 + 30	Eliminated
9	Rumba	"Eternal Flame" — The Bangles	10	10	10	59 (29 + 30	Eliminated

==== Season 4 ====
with John Ratzenberger

Week #	Dance	Song	Judges' score			Total	Result
Week #	Dance	Song	Inaba	Goodman	Tonioli	Total	Result
1	Cha-cha-cha	"Chain of Fools" — Aretha Franklin	6	5	6	17	No Elimination
2	Quickstep	"The Lady Is a Tramp" — Sammy Davis Jr.	7	7	7	21	Safe
3	Tango	"Libertango" — Astor Piazolla	7	6	7	20	Safe
4	Paso doble	"A Kind of Magic" — Queen	6	5	5	16	Bottom Two
5	Samba	"Love Is in the Air" — John Paul Young	6	6	6	18	Safe
6	Mambo	"Mambo Swing" — Big Bad Voodoo Daddy	7	6	6	19	Bottom Two
7	Foxtrot	"That's Life" — Frank Sinatra	8	7	8	45 (23 + 22)	Eliminated
7	Rumba	"Under Pressure" — Queen & David Bowie	7	8	7	45 (23 + 22)	Eliminated

==== Season 5 ====
with Cameron Mathison

Week #	Dance	Song	Judges' score			Total	Result
Week #	Dance	Song	Inaba	Goodman	Tonioli	Total	Result
1	Foxtrot	"Moondance" — Van Morrison	7	7	7	21	Safe
2	Mambo	"Mas Que Nada" — Sérgio Mendes & The Black Eyed Peas	7	7	7	21	Safe
3	Tango	"The Beat Goes On" — Sonny & Cher	8	7	8	23	Safe
4	Paso doble	"Theme from Superman" — John Williams	9	9	9	27	Safe
5	Rumba	"I've Got to See You Again" — Norah Jones	8	9	9	26	Safe
6	Samba	"Magalenha" — Sérgio Mendes	9	8	8	25	Bottom Two
7	Quickstep	"Why Can't I Be You?" — The Cure	8	8	8	51 (24 + 27)	Safe
7	Jive	"Boy from New York City" — The Manhattan Transfer	9	9	9	51 (24 + 27)	Safe
8	Viennese waltz	"Hedwig's Theme" — John Williams	9	9	9	51 (27 + 24)	Eliminated
8	Cha-cha-cha	"Brown Sugar" — Rolling Stones	8	8	8	51 (27 + 24)	Eliminated

==== Season 6 ====
with Jason Taylor

Week #	Dance	Song	Judges' score			Total	Result
Week #	Dance	Song	Inaba	Goodman	Tonioli	Total	Result
1	Foxtrot	"Pride and Joy" — Marvin Gaye	7	8	7	22	No Elimination
2	Mambo	"Lupita" — Perez Prado	9	9	9	27	Safe
3	Jive	"I Got a Woman" — Ray Charles	8	7	8	23	Safe
4	Viennese waltz	"It's a Man's, Man's, Man's World" — James Brown	10	9	10	29	Safe
5	Rumba	"You're All I Need to Get By" — Marvin Gaye & Tammi Terrell	9	9	9	27	Safe
6	Cha-cha-cha	"Best of My Love" — The Emotions	8	8	8	24	Safe
7	Quickstep	"The Dirty Boogie" — The Brian Setzer Orchestra	10	9	10	55 (29 + 26)	Safe
7	Paso doble	"Heavy Action" — Johnny Pearson	9	8	9	55 (29 + 26)	Safe
8	Tango	"Tango Barbaro" — Lalo Schifrin	10	9	10	52 (29 + 23)	Safe
8	Samba	"It Had Better Be Tonight" — Michael Bublé	8	7	8	52 (29 + 23)	Safe
9	Foxtrot	"Let's Call the Whole Thing Off" — Louis Armstrong & Ella Fitzgerald	9	10	9	55 (28 + 27)	Safe
9	Paso doble	"El gato montés" — Manuel Penella	9	9	9	55 (28 + 27)	Safe
10	Group Cha-cha-cha	"Dancing on the Ceiling" — Lionel Richie	8	8	8	81 (24 + 27 + 30)	Runners-up
10	Freestyle	"Miami" — Will Smith	9	9	9	81 (24 + 27 + 30)	Runners-up
10	Quickstep	"The Dirty Boogie" — The Brian Setzer Orchestra	10	10	10	81 (24 + 27 + 30)	Runners-up

==== Season 7 ====
with Jeffrey Ross

Week #	Dance	Song	Judges' score			Total	Result
Week #	Dance	Song	Inaba	Goodman	Tonioli	Total	Result
1	Cha-cha-cha	"Play That Funky Music" — Wild Cherry	4	4	4	12	No Elimination
1	Quickstep	"I Get a Kick Out of You" — Frank Sinatra	—N/a			X (Note: Jeffrey & Edyta performed their quickstep, but did not receive scores.)	Eliminated

==== Season 8 ====
with Lawrence Taylor

Week #	Dance	Song	Judges' score			Total	Result
Week #	Dance	Song	Inaba	Goodman	Tonioli	Total	Result
1	Cha-cha-cha	"Twenty-Five Miles" — Edwin Starr	6	5	5	16	No Elimination
2	Quickstep	"As Long as I'm Singing" — The Brian Setzer Orchestra	7	6	7	20	Safe
3	Samba	"I Can't Get Next To You" — The Temptations	7	6	7	20	Safe
4	Argentine tango	"Suite Punta Del Este" — Ástor Piazzolla	7	5	7	19	Safe
5	Paso doble	"Granada" — Agustín Lara	6	7	7	20	Bottom Two
5	Paso doble Dance-off	"Granada" — Agustín Lara	6	7	7	20	Safe
6	Jive	"Ain't That Peculiar" — Marvin Gaye	7	7	8	22	Safe
7	Waltz	"Open Arms" — Journey	7	7	7	21	Eliminated

==== Season 9 ====
with Ashley Hamilton

Week #	Dance	Song	Judges' score			Total	Result
Week #	Dance	Song	Inaba	Goodman	Tonioli	Total	Result
1	Foxtrot	"Grace Kelly" — Mika	5	6	4	19 (15 + 4)	Eliminated
1	Salsa Relay	"Get Busy" — Sean Paul	4 (Note: Ashley & Edyta received 4 bonus points from the relay.)			19 (15 + 4)	Eliminated

==== Season 10 ====
with Aiden Turner

Week #	Dance	Song	Judges' score			Total	Result
Week #	Dance	Song	Inaba	Goodman	Tonioli	Total	Result
1	Cha-cha-cha	"Hungry Like the Wolf" — Duran Duran	5	5	5	15	No Elimination
2	Foxtrot	"I've Got You Under My Skin" — Frank Sinatra	7	6	6	19	Safe
3	Quickstep	"Hey, Soul Sister" — Train	7	6	7	20	Safe
4	Rumba	"Live Like We're Dying" — Kris Allen	5	5	5	33 (Note: Week 4 was double-score week. Aiden & Edyta received a 15 on technical scores, and an 18 on performance scores.) (15 + 18	Eliminated
4	Rumba	"Live Like We're Dying" — Kris Allen	6	6	6	33 (15 + 18	Eliminated

==== Season 22 ====
with Geraldo Rivera

Week #	Dance	Song	Judges' score			Total	Result
Week #	Dance	Song	Inaba	Goodman	Tonioli	Total	Result
1	Cha-cha-cha	"Treasure" — Bruno Mars	5	4	4	13	No Elimination
2	Salsa	"Ran Kan Kan" — Tito Puente	5	4	4	13	Eliminated

== Personal life ==
Śliwińska's husband and professional partner in dance competitions is Alec Mazo, who also participated in Dancing with the Stars, winning with Kelly Monaco in season one. They have danced together for over 6 years and have performed together multiple times for Dancing with the Stars results shows in pair numbers. They married on September 1, 2007. They have two children; she gave birth to their son, Michael Alexander Mazo, on January 4, 2014. On June 18, 2017, she gave birth to their second child, a daughter named Leia Josephine.

== Professional awards ==
- Emerald Ball Latin Amateur Champion
- 1st Place - 2001 International Grand Ball (San Francisco)
- 1st Place - 2001 Holiday Ball (Las Vegas, Nevada)

== Acting career ==
- Śliwińska appeared in a Jared's jewelry commercial along with fellow Dancing With the Stars pros Maksim Chmerkovskiy, Alec Mazo, and Shalene Archer Ermis.
- She played Ruby Love on CSI: NY on the 13th episode of season 5 called "Rush to Judgment", where she played a salsa dance teacher who was involved in a murder.
- In 2013, Śliwińska appeared on the May 13th edition of WWE Raw as the dance partner of Dancing with the Stars alumni Chris Jericho during a Dance-Off segment between Jericho and herself against Fandango and his partner Summer Rae.
