= Dancing with the Stars (American TV series) season 1 =

Dancing with the Stars
- Season 1
- Promotional poster, displayed at Dancing with the Stars Con 2026
- Hosted by: Tom Bergeron; Lisa Canning
- Judges: Carrie Ann Inaba; Len Goodman; Bruno Tonioli
- Celebrity winner: Kelly Monaco
- Professional winner: Alec Mazo
- No. of episodes: 8 (including 2 specials)

Release
- Original network: ABC
- Original release: June 1 – September 22, 2005

Season chronology
- Next → Season 2

The first season of Dancing with the Stars debuted on ABC on June 1, 2005. Six celebrities were paired with six professional ballroom dancers. Tom Bergeron and Lisa Canning were the hosts while Carrie Ann Inaba, Len Goodman, and Bruno Tonioli were the three judges for this season.

The premiere drew over 13 million viewers, the second biggest summer debut ever for an American reality series after Survivor. The second week climbed to 15 million viewers, and the show climbed to the top of the ratings in the summer 2005 TV season, where it remained for the remainder of the season.

The season finale aired on July 6, 2005, where General Hospital actress Kelly Monaco and Alec Mazo were announced as the winners, while actor John O'Hurley and Charlotte Jørgensen finished in second place.

Due to controversy over Kelly Monaco winning over the consistently higher-scoring John O'Hurley, a special rematch episode was held on September 20, 2005, with the results announced on a September 22 telecast. This time, John O'Hurley and Charlotte Jørgensen were the champions, and sizable donations were made to both Monaco and O'Hurley's chosen charities.

== Cast ==
=== Couples ===
This season featured six celebrity contestants.

Celebrity	Notability	Professional partner	Status
Trista Sutter	The Bachelorette star	Louis van Amstel	Eliminated 1st on June 8, 2005
Evander Holyfield	Heavyweight boxer	Edyta Śliwińska	Eliminated 2nd on June 15, 2005
Rachel Hunter	Supermodel	Jonathan Roberts	Eliminated 3rd on June 22, 2005
Joey McIntyre	New Kids on the Block singer	Ashly DelGrosso	Eliminated 4th on June 29, 2005
John O'Hurley	Television actor & game show host	Charlotte Jørgensen	Runners-up on July 6, 2005
Kelly Monaco	General Hospital actress	Alec Mazo	Winners on July 6, 2005

Future appearances

Kelly Monaco returned for the All-Stars season, where she was paired with Valentin Chmerkovskiy.

== Episodes ==
No. overall	No. in season	Title	Rating (18–49)	Original release date	U.S. viewers (millions)
1	1	"Round One"	4.30	June 1, 2005	13.48
2	2	"Round Two"	4.80	June 8, 2005	15.09
3	3	"Round Three"	4.80	June 15, 2005	15.67
4	4	"Round Four"	4.40	June 22, 2005	15.52
5	5	"Round Five"	5.60	June 29, 2005	18.59
6	6	"Round Six"	6.70	July 6, 2005	22.36
7	7	"Dance Off"	2.80	September 20, 2005	10.91
8	8	"Dance Off: Results"	2.60	September 22, 2005	10.48

== Scoring chart ==
The highest score each week is indicated in bold green with a dagger (†), while the lowest score each week is indicated in italicized red with a double-dagger (‡).

Color key:

Winners
Runners-up
Bottom two
Eliminated

Dancing with the Stars (season 1) - Weekly scores
Couple	Pl.	Week						
Couple	Pl.	1	2	1+2	3	4	5	6
Kelly & Alec	1st	13‡	17	30‡	21	**26**†	22+25=47 (Note: This couple was in the bottom two, but was not eliminated.)	25+30=**55**† (Note: This couple finished in first place.)
John & Charlotte	2nd	**20**†	**26**†	**46**†	24	21	27+27=**54**†	27+27=54‡ (Note: This couple finished in second place.)
Joey & Ashly	3rd	**20**†	21	41	22	20‡	20+25=45‡ (Note: This couple was eliminated.)	
Rachel & Jonathan	4th	**20**†	24	44	**26**†	25		
Evander & Edyta	5th	18	14‡	32	13‡			
Trista & Louis	6th	18	19	37				

Notes

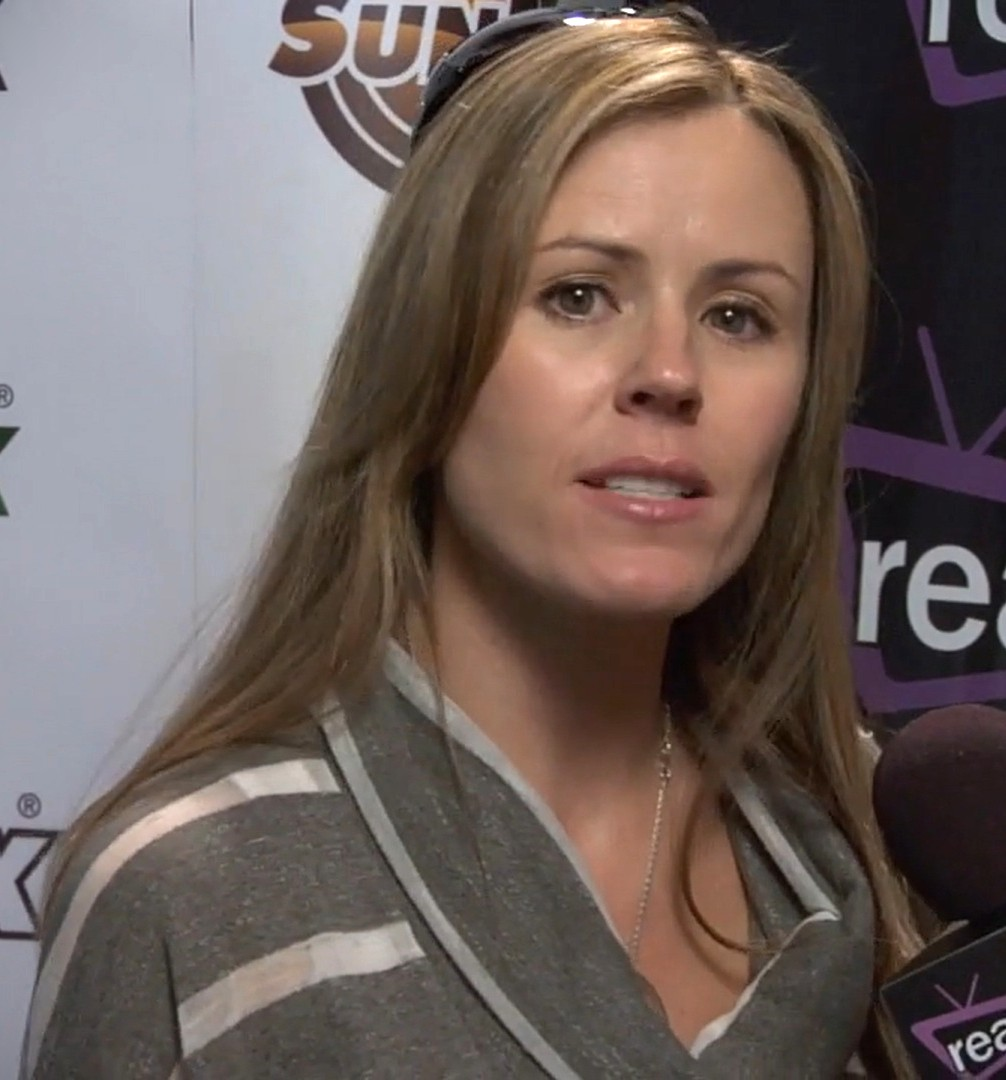
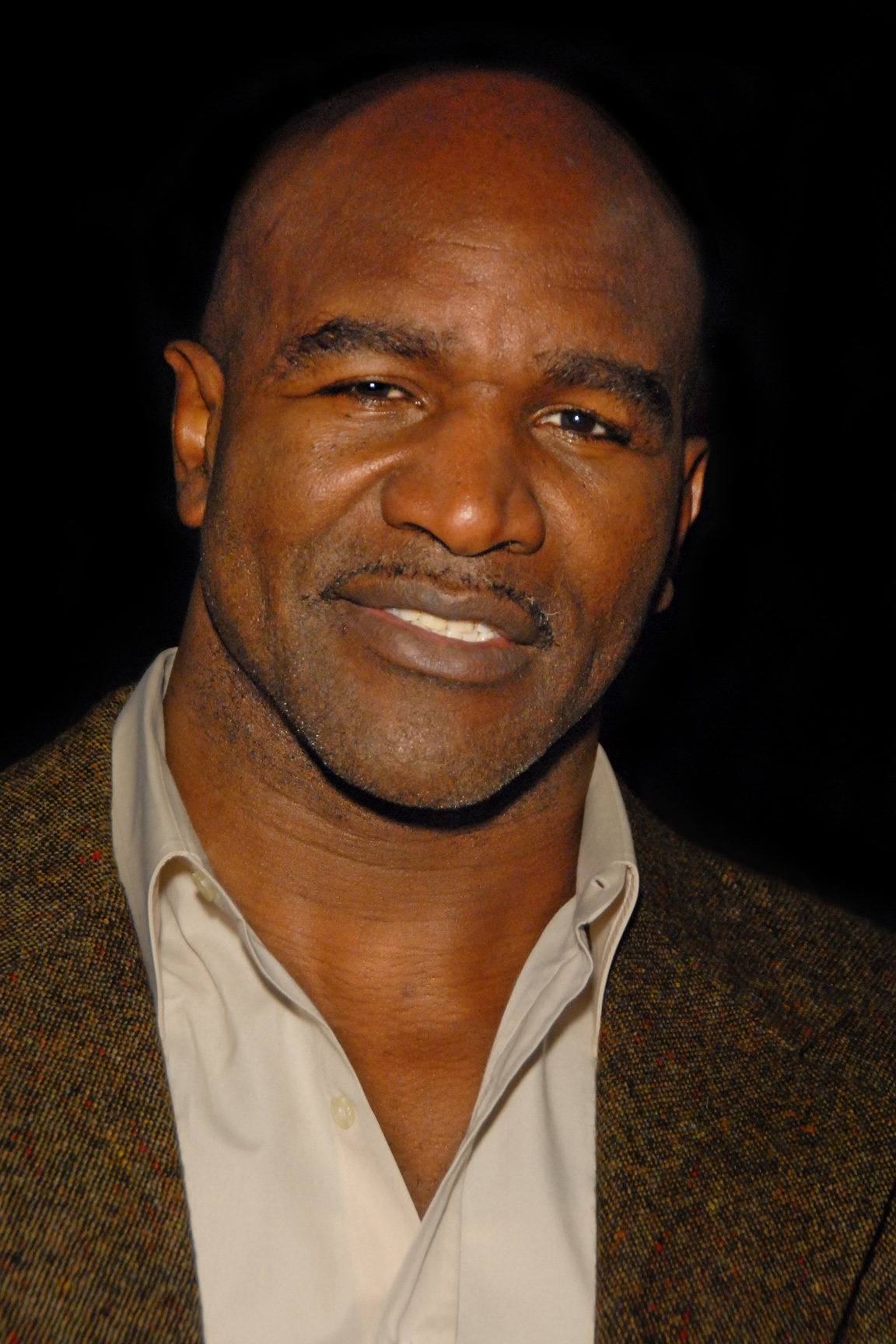
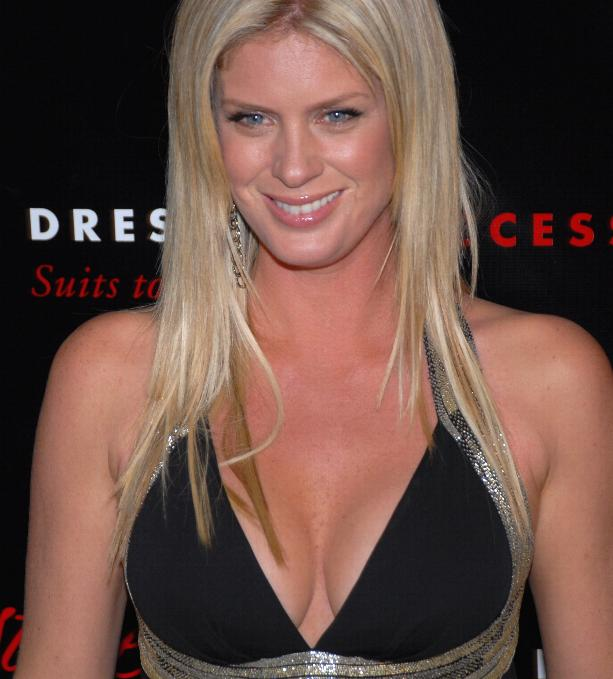
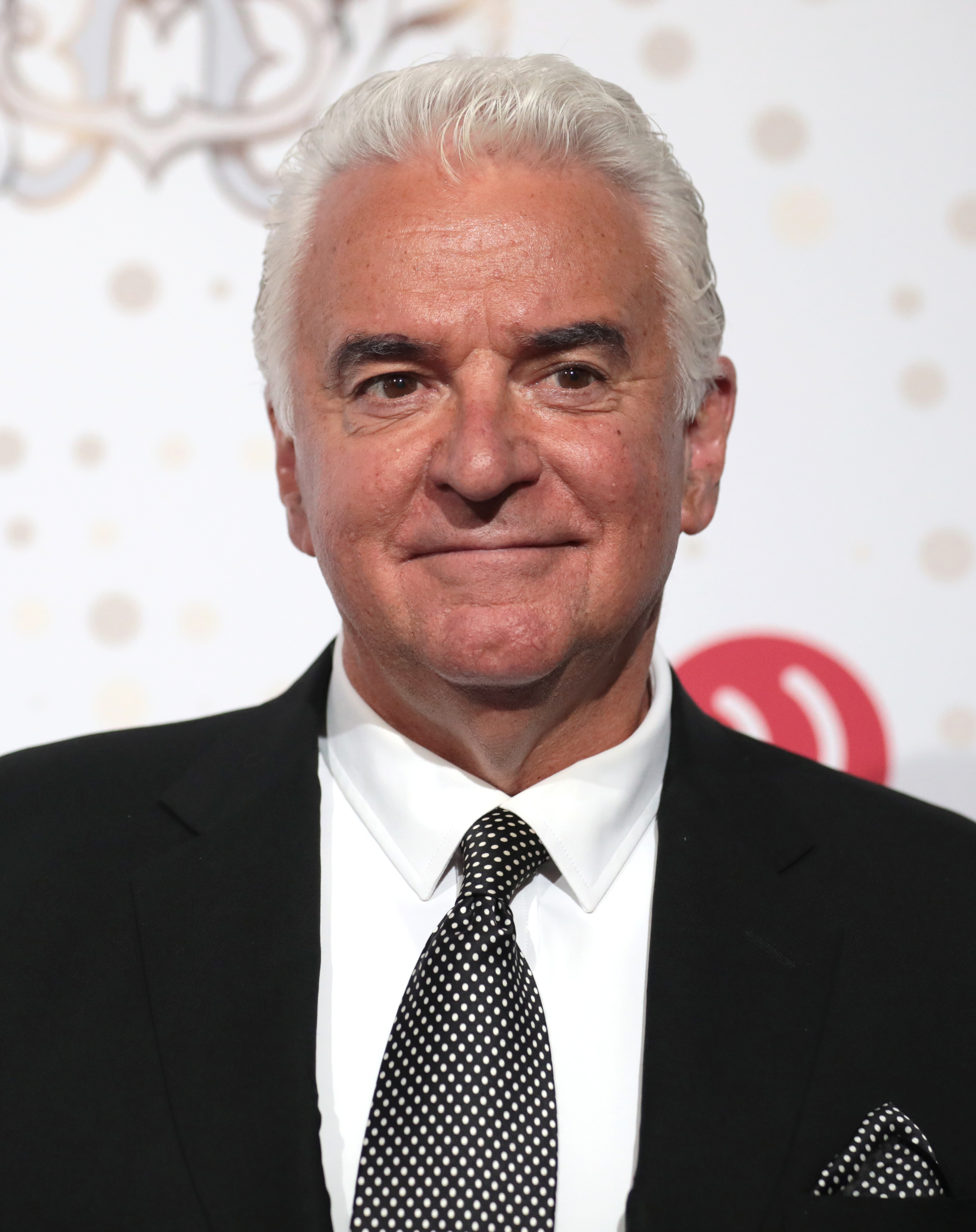
The celebrities who competed in the first season of Dancing With The Stars, pictured in order of elimination (L–R):

Trista Sutter, Evander Holyfield, Rachel Hunter, Joey McIntyre, and John O'Hurley

Not pictured: Kelly Monaco

== Weekly scores ==
Individual judges' scores in the charts below (given in parentheses) are listed in this order from left to right: Carrie Ann Inaba, Len Goodman, Bruno Tonioli.

=== Week 1 ===
Each couple performed either the cha-cha-cha or the waltz. Couples are listed in the order they performed.

Couple	Scores	Dance	Music
Joey & Ashly	20 (7, 7, 6)	Cha-cha-cha	"Crazy in Love" — Beyoncé, feat. Jay-Z
Rachel & Jonathan	20 (7, 6, 7)	Waltz	"Three Times A Lady" — Commodores
Evander & Edyta	18 (5, 7, 6)	Cha-cha-cha	"Respect" — Aretha Franklin
Kelly & Alec	13 (5, 4, 4)	Waltz	"I Have Nothing" — Whitney Houston
John & Charlotte	20 (7, 7, 6)	Cha-cha-cha	"September" — Earth, Wind & Fire
Trista & Louis	18 (6, 6, 6)	Waltz	"Come Away with Me" — Norah Jones

=== Week 2 ===
Each couple performed either the quickstep or the rumba. Couples are listed in the order they performed.

Couple	Scores	Dance	Music	Result
Rachel & Jonathan	24 (8, 8, 8)	Rumba	"I Don't Wanna Miss a Thing" — Aerosmith	Bottom two
Joey & Ashly	21 (8, 7, 6)	Quickstep	"You're The One That I Want" — John Travolta & Olivia Newton-John	Safe
Trista & Louis	19 (6, 7, 6)	Rumba	"Endless Love" — Diana Ross & Lionel Richie	Eliminated
John & Charlotte	26 (8, 9, 9)	Quickstep	"Let's Face the Music and Dance" — Irving Berlin	Safe
Kelly & Alec	17 (5, 6, 6)	Rumba	"Hero" — Enrique Iglesias	Safe
Evander & Edyta	14 (5, 4, 5)	Quickstep	"It Don't Mean a Thing" — Duke Ellington	Safe

=== Week 3 ===
Each couple performed either the jive or the tango. Couples are listed in the order they performed.

Couple	Scores	Dance	Music	Result
Evander & Edyta	13 (5, 4, 4)	Jive	"Reet Petite" — Jackie Wilson	Eliminated
Rachel & Jonathan	26 (8, 9, 9)	Tango	"Toxic" — Britney Spears	Safe
Kelly & Alec	21 (6, 7, 8)	Jive	"Footloose" — Kenny Loggins	Safe
John & Charlotte	24 (9, 8, 7)	Tango	"Dance with Me" — Debelah Morgan	Safe
Joey & Ashly	22 (7, 7, 8)	Jive	"I'm Still Standing" — Elton John	Bottom two

=== Week 4 ===
Each couple performed the samba, as well as a group Viennese waltz. Couples are listed in the order they performed.

Couple	Scores	Dance	Music	Result
Joey & Ashly	20 (7, 6, 7)	Samba	"Tequila" — The Champs	Safe
Rachel & Jonathan	25 (7, 9, 9)	Samba	"Soul Bossa Nova" — Quincy Jones	Eliminated
John & Charlotte	21 (7, 8, 6)	Samba	"Just The Two of Us" — Grover Washington, Jr. & Bill Withers	Bottom two
Kelly & Alec	26 (9, 9, 8)	Samba	"Bailamos" — Enrique Iglesias	Safe
Joey & Ashly John & Charlotte Kelly & Alec Rachel & Jonathan	No scores received	Group; Viennese waltz	"I Got You Babe" — Sonny & Cher	

=== Week 5: Semifinals ===
Each couple performed both the foxtrot and the paso doble. Couples are listed in the order they performed.

Couple	Scores	Dance	Music	Result
John & Charlotte	27 (9, 9, 9)	Foxtrot	"Let There Be Love" — Nat King Cole	Safe
John & Charlotte	27 (9, 9, 9)	Paso doble	"España cañí" — Mexicana Aleque la-Band	Safe
Kelly & Alec	22 (8, 7, 7)	Foxtrot	"Don't Know Why" — Norah Jones	Bottom two
Kelly & Alec	25 (9, 8, 8)	Paso doble	"Bamboleo" — Gipsy Kings	Bottom two
Joey & Ashly	20 (8, 6, 6)	Foxtrot	"Big Spender" — Shirley Bassey	Eliminated
Joey & Ashly	25 (9, 8, 8)	Paso doble	"Eye of the Tiger" — Survivor	Eliminated

=== Week 6: Finale ===
Each couple performed two dances, one of which was a freestyle. Couples are listed in the order they performed.

Couple	Scores	Dance	Music	Result
John & Charlotte	27 (9, 9, 9)	Quickstep	"Let's Face the Music and Dance" — Irving Berlin	Runners-up
John & Charlotte	27 (9, 9, 9)	Freestyle	"I'm So Excited" — The Pointer Sisters	Runners-up
Kelly & Alec	25 (7, 9, 9)	Samba	"Bailamos" — Enrique Iglesias	Winners
Kelly & Alec	30 (10, 10, 10)	Freestyle	"Let's Get Loud" — Jennifer Lopez	Winners

=== Rematch ===
This was a special "rematch" broadcast that aired on September 20, 2005, with the results announced on September 22.

Couple	Scores	Dance	Music	Result
Kelly & Alec	25 (7, 9, 9)	Cha-cha-cha	"Lady Marmalade" — All Saints	Runners-up
Kelly & Alec	24 (9, 7, 8)	Quickstep	"Diamonds Are a Girl's Best Friend" — Marilyn Monroe	Runners-up
Kelly & Alec	25 (8, 8, 9)	Freestyle	"Get The Party Started" — Pink	Runners-up
John & Charlotte	22 (7, 8, 7)	Rumba	"The Look of Love" — Anita Baker	Winners
John & Charlotte	30 (10, 10, 10)	Waltz	"You Light Up My Life" — Whitney Houston	Winners
John & Charlotte	25 (8, 8, 9)	Freestyle	"I Am What I Am" — Gloria Gaynor	Winners

== Dance chart ==
The couples performed the following each week:

- Week 1: One unlearned dance (cha-cha-cha or waltz)
- Week 2: One unlearned dance (quickstep or rumba)
- Week 3: One unlearned dance (jive or tango)
- Week 4: Samba & Viennese waltz group dance
- Week 5 (Semifinals): Two unlearned dances (foxtrot & paso doble)
- Week 6 (Finals): One previously performed dance & freestyle

Dancing with the Stars (season 1) - Dance chart
Couple	Week								
Couple	1	2	3	4		5		6	
Kelly & Alec	Waltz	Rumba	Jive	Samba	Group; Viennese waltz	Foxtrot	Paso doble	Samba	Freestyle
John & Charlotte	Cha-cha-cha	Quickstep	Tango	Samba	Group; Viennese waltz	Foxtrot	Paso doble	Quickstep	Freestyle
Joey & Ashly	Cha-cha-cha	Quickstep	Jive	Samba	Group; Viennese waltz	Foxtrot	Paso doble		
Rachel & Jonathan	Waltz	Rumba	Tango	Samba	Group; Viennese waltz				
Evander & Edyta	Cha-cha-cha	Quickstep	Jive						
Trista & Louis	Waltz	Rumba							
