= Kelly Monaco =

American actress (born 1976)

- Born: Kelly Marie Monaco; May 23, 1976 (age 50); Philadelphia, Pennsylvania, U.S.
- Occupations: Actress, model
- Years active: 1997–present
- Partner: Mike Gonzalez (1991–2009)
- Awards: See below

Playboy centerfold appearance
- April 1997
- Preceded by: Jennifer Miriam
- Succeeded by: Lynn Thomas

Personal details
- Height: 5 ft 3 in (1.60 m)

Signature
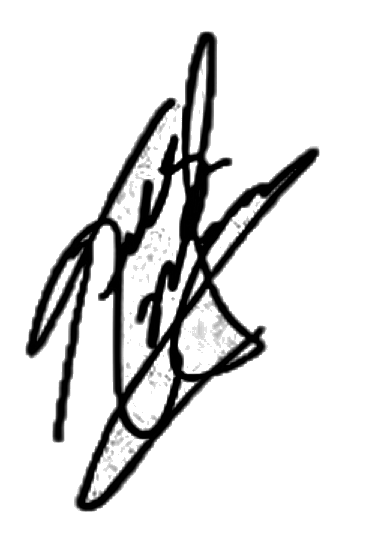

Kelly Marie Monaco (born May 23, 1976) is an American actress, model, and reality television personality, best known for her portrayal of Sam McCall on the ABC soap opera General Hospital and as the first season winner of the reality TV competition series Dancing with the Stars. Monaco was also Playboy "Playmate of the Month" for April 1997, and portrayed Livvie Locke on the soap opera Port Charles from 2000 through 2003.

== Early life and education ==
Kelly Monaco was born in Philadelphia, Pennsylvania, to Albert "Al" and Carmina Monaco. She is the middle child and has four sisters. The family moved to the Poconos, where she attended Pocono Mountain High School and took her first acting classes. After high school, she worked as a lifeguard at a local resort and attended Northampton Community College for two years.

== Career ==
=== Early modeling ===
In 1996, Monaco sent her photo to Playboy. As a result, she became the Playmate of the Month for April 1997. Throughout her tenure with Playboy in the 1990s, Monaco was also featured in several Playboy Special Edition publications.

=== Acting and reality television ===
Monaco's first television role was in the drama Baywatch from 1997 to 1998. In addition to playing the role of Susan on the show, she was also Carmen Electra's body double at times, as Electra could not swim. Monaco also had minor roles in the late 1990s films BASEketball, Idle Hands, and Mumford.

Monaco played Olivia "Livvie" Locke Morley (1999–2003) in the ABC soap opera Port Charles, as well as Livvie's magically created doppelganger Tess Ramsey (2002–03). When that program ended, she joined the cast of the ABC soap opera General Hospital, of which Port Charles had been a spinoff, as Samantha McCall in October 2003.

In 2003, Monaco was nominated for a Daytime Emmy Award for Outstanding Supporting Actress in a Drama Series for her role on Port Charles. In 2006, she was again nominated for a Daytime Emmy, this time for Outstanding Lead Actress in a Drama Series for her role as Sam McCall on General Hospital. In 2006, Monaco also co-hosted the 33rd Annual Daytime Emmys, with Dancing with the Stars host Tom Bergeron.

In March 2009, Monaco was chosen by Donald Trump and Paula Shugart to be one of the judges for the 2009 Miss USA pageant.

Monaco starred on the E! reality television series Dirty Soap, which premiered on September 25, 2011.

She was a cast member, and the season winner along with her professional partner, Alec Mazo, on the ABC reality-television series Dancing with the Stars, during its first season in 2005. Although she initially faced tough criticism from the judges, she maintained a positive outlook throughout the series. Among the events she experienced before her victory was a wardrobe malfunction in which the skimpy strap on her dress came apart during a Latin dance number. Monaco remained the only female to win the competition until season 6 when Kristi Yamaguchi won.

Monaco appeared in a Maxim cover feature in 2005, and the magazine also placed her at #13 on their annual Hot 100 List in 2006.

In February 2009, Monaco expanded her dancing résumé with Peepshow, a burlesque act directed by Tony Award-winning director Jerry Mitchell, that plays at the Planet Hollywood Resort and Casino in Las Vegas. Monaco starred as Bo Peep, a precocious character who discovers her sexuality throughout the show. Monaco starred alongside singer and fellow Dancing with the Stars contestant Melanie Brown, until June 2009, when Monaco's contract expired and she was replaced by Holly Madison. The same year, Monaco was named Maxim's number one sexiest cover model of the decade.

On July 27, 2012, it was announced that Monaco would be participating in the fifteenth season of Dancing with the Stars for a chance to win a second mirrorball trophy. This time she was partnered with Valentin Chmerkovskiy. After making the finals for a second time, Monaco finished in third place on November 27, 2012.

In November 2017, Monaco returned to twenty fifth season of Dancing with the Stars in week eight, to participate in a trio rumba with Terrell Owens and his professional partner Cheryl Burke.

On August 26, 2024. Soap Opera Network announced Monaco had been fired from General Hospital following a network decision to "terminate her character".

== Charity work ==
In July 2009, Monaco and several other daytime celebrities traveled to Kenya, Africa, as a part of the Feed the Children program, delivering food and other supplies and visiting schools and orphanages built by Feed the Children.

On October 24, 2009, as part of the iParticipate campaign, Monaco and several of her General Hospital co-stars volunteered to help beautify a school in Los Angeles.

== Personal life ==
When Monaco was a junior in high school, she met Mike Gonzalez and began a relationship with him. They worked together as lifeguards at a local resort and attended Northampton Community College together. They remained together for 18 years. They broke up in 2009.

On April 25, 2009, Monaco's apartment at the Planet Hollywood Las Vegas was ransacked by burglars.

== Filmography ==
=== Film ===
Year	Title	Role	Notes
1998	BASEketball	Sharon	
1998	Welcome to Hollywood	Baywatch Woman Guard	
1999	Idle Hands	Tiffany	
1999	Mumford	Landlady's Daughter	

=== Television ===
Year	Title	Role	Notes
1997–1998	Baywatch	Model flying Kite / Model at Photoshoot / Rookie Lifeguard Susan	Episodes: "The Choice", "Quarantine", "Diabolique"
1999	Late Last Night	Centerfold Elaina	Television movie
2000–2003	Port Charles	Livvie Locke / Tess Ramsey	Main role; July 7, 2000 – October 3, 2003; Role: October 1, 2002 – March 25, 2003
2001	Spin City	Nurse	Episode: "A Shot in the Dark: Part 1"
2003–2024	General Hospital	Sam McCall / Alicia Montenegro	Series regular; October 1, 2003 – November 1, 2024; Role: July – August 2005
2005, 2012	Dancing with the Stars	Herself	Contestant: Season 1 & 15
2011	Dirty Soap	Herself	Main cast
2011	The Edge of the Garden	Julie	Television movie
2015	Baby Daddy	Kelly Monaco	Episode: "Over My Dead Bonnie"

== Awards and nominations ==
List of acting awards and nominations
Year	Award	Category	Title	Result	Ref.
2003	Daytime Emmy Award	Outstanding Supporting Actress in a Drama Series	Port Charles	Nominated	
2006	Daytime Emmy Award	Outstanding Lead Actress in a Drama Series	General Hospital	Nominated	
2020	Soap Hub Awards	Favorite General Hospital Actress	General Hospital	Nominated	
2021	Soap Hub Awards	Favorite General Hospital Actress	General Hospital	Nominated	

Jami Ferrell	Kimber West	Jennifer Miriam	Kelly Monaco	Lynn Thomas	Carrie Stevens
Daphnée Duplaix	Kalin Olson	Nikki Ziering	Layla Roberts	Inga Drozdova	Karen McDougal
