= Alec Mazo =

American investor and dancer

- Born: April 5, 1978 (age 48); Gomel, Soviet Union
- Education: B.S. Cognitive Science; MBA
- Alma mater: University of California, Berkeley; Stanford University
- Television: Dancing with the Stars
- Height: 5 ft 11 in (180 cm)
- Spouse: Edyta Śliwińska (m. 2007)
- Children: 2

Alec Mazo (born April 5, 1978) is an American investor who works at DGA Capital. He became known for his participation in the American edition of the reality television series Dancing with the Stars, the first season of which he won with partner Kelly Monaco. He participated in five seasons of the television show and four DWTS tours, produced live stage shows for casinos and executive produced a 70 city live stage tour in collaboration with Troika Entertainment (producer of Wicked, Phantom of the Opera, Cats, Annie).

== Early life ==
Mazo was born just 50 kilometers from Chernobyl, Ukraine into a Jewish family. He has been dancing since he was 5 years old. At age 12, he immigrated from the Soviet Union to San Antonio, Texas, and later to San Francisco, where his former engineer mother, Natalia, opened a dance school. Mazo helped run the school to make ends meet. His family moved from the former USSR as refugees, with nothing in their pockets.

== Education and personal life ==
He studied computer science, and then cognitive science at the University of California, Berkeley . After DWTS, Mazo went to Stanford University to get his Alfred P. Sloan Masters in Management. He ran a production company specializing in live stage entertainment and television reality formats. He is currently a general partner at DGA Capital, investing in the capital markets.

When he was a teenager, Mazo worked as the CEO of the Genesis Dance Sport studio in San Francisco. Expanding the studio into Los Angeles has been one of his goals. He has one brother, Genya, who's also a ballroom dancer and has performed on the Dancing with the Stars tour. Alec Mazo is married to his long-time dancing partner dancer Edyta Śliwińska, a native of Poland. The couple have a son born in 2014 and a daughter born in 2017.

== Career ==
Mazo appeared in the 1998 movie Dance With Me. Mazo turned professional shortly before producers of Dancing with the Stars began their search for dancers to star on the show.

Mazo won the first season of Dancing with the Stars with his partner, Kelly Monaco.

Mazo returned to the ballroom on March 19 for Season 4, this time partnered with former supermodel Paulina Porizkova, but were the first couple eliminated.

Mazo appeared on the fifth season of Dancing with the Stars. Mazo and his partner, supermodel Josie Maran, were eliminated on September 26, 2007, after the first week of competition.

Mazo competed for the title with partner, Grammy Award-winning singer, Toni Braxton in Season 7 of Dancing with the Stars. After six dances, Braxton and Mazo became the fifth couple to be eliminated from the season.

In Season 9, Mazo was paired with Olympic swimmer, Natalie Coughlin. They were the fifth couple to be eliminated.

Season	Partner	Place	Average Score
1	Kelly Monaco	1st	22.38
4	Paulina Porizkova	11th	20.00
5	Josie Maran	12th	16.00
7	Toni Braxton	8th	22.33
9	Natalie Coughlin	10th	22.40

=== Dancing with the Stars performances ===
==== Season 1 ====
With celebrity partner Kelly Monaco

Week #	Dance/Song	Judges' score			Total	Result
Week #	Dance/Song	Inaba	Goodman	Tonioli	Total	Result
1	Waltz/ "I Have Nothing"	5	4	4	13	No Elimination
2	Rumba/ "Hero"	5	6	6	17	Safe
3	Jive/ "Footloose"	6	7	8	21	Safe
4	Samba/ "Bailamos"; Viennese Waltz/ "I Got You Babe"	9 No	9 Scores	8 Given	26	Safe
5	Foxtrot/ "Don't Know Why"; Paso Doble/ "Bamboleo"	8; 9	7; 8	7; 8	47 (22 + 25	Bottom Two
6	Samba/ "Bailamos"; Freestyle/ "Let's Get Loud"	7; 10	9; 10	9; 10	55 (25 + 30)	WON
Dance-Off	Cha-Cha-Cha/ "Lady Marmalade"; Quickstep/ "Diamonds are a Girl's Best Friend"; Freestyle/ "Get The Party Started"	7; 9; 8	9; 7; 8	9; 8; 9	74 (25 + 24 + 25)	Second Place

==== Season 4 ====
With celebrity partner Paulina Porizkova

Week #	Dance/Song	Judges' score			Total	Result
Week #	Dance/Song	Inaba	Goodman	Tonioli	Total	Result
1	Foxtrot/ "Too Darn Hot"	6	6	7	19	No elimination
2	Mambo/ "La Bamba"	7	7	7	21	Eliminated

==== Season 5 ====
With celebrity partner Josie Maran

Week #	Dance/Song	Judges' score			Total	Result
Week #	Dance/Song	Inaba	Goodman	Tonioli	Total	Result
1	Foxtrot/ "Walkin' My Baby Back Home"	6	5	5	16	Eliminated

==== Season 7 ====
With celebrity partner Toni Braxton

Week #	Dance/Song	Judges' score			Total	Result
Week #	Dance/Song	Inaba	Goodman	Tonioli	Total	Result
1A	Cha-Cha-Cha/ "Smooth"	7	7	8	22	Safe
1B	Quickstep/ "Blue Skies"	8	7	8	23	Safe
2	Rumba/ "I Can't Make You Love Me"	7	8	8	23	Safe
3	Viennese Waltz/ "Für Elise"	8	7	7	22	Safe
4	Samba/ "De Donde Soy"	7	7	8	22	Safe
5	West Coast Swing/ "The Way You Make Me Feel"	7	7	8	22	Eliminated

==== Season 9 ====
With celebrity partner Natalie Coughlin

Week #	Dance/Song	Judges' score			Total	Result
Week #	Dance/Song	Inaba	Goodman	Tonioli	Total	Result
1	Salsa/ "1+1=2"; Foxtrot/ "The Best Is Yet to Come"	7 Awarded	6; 8	6 Points	27 (19 + 8)	Safe
2	Quickstep/ "I Want You Back"	7	7	7	21	Safe
3	Rumba/ "In The Air Tonight"	9	8	9	26	Safe
4	Bolero/ "Better in Time"	8	8	8	24	Safe
5	Paso Doble/ "American Woman"; Group Hustle/ "The Hustle"	7 No	8 Scores	7 Given	22	Eliminated

New show	Dancing with the Stars (US) winner Season 1 (Summer 2005 with Kelly Monaco)	Succeeded by Drew Lachey & Cheryl Burke
Preceded by Tucker Carlson & Elena Grinenko	Dancing with the Stars (US) last place Season 4 (Spring 2007 with Paulina Porizkova); Season 5 (Autumn 2007 with Josie Maran)	Succeeded by Penn Jillette & Kym Johnson
