= Dancing with the Stars (American TV series) season 4 =

Dancing with the Stars
- Season 4
- Promotional poster, featuring pro dancer Anna Trebunskaya
- Hosted by: Tom Bergeron; Samantha Harris
- Judges: Carrie Ann Inaba; Len Goodman; Bruno Tonioli
- Celebrity winner: Apolo Anton Ohno
- Professional winner: Julianne Hough
- No. of episodes: 19

Release
- Original network: ABC
- Original release: March 19 – May 22, 2007

Season chronology
- ← Previous; Season 3 Next → Season 5

Season four of Dancing with the Stars premiered on March 19, 2007, on the ABC network.

To avoid direct competition with Fox's American Idol, Dancing with the Stars changed time slots from the previous season. This season, the performance show aired on Mondays and the results show aired on Tuesdays. No elimination took place the first week in order to allow viewers two weeks to see all of the couples perform both Latin and ballroom dances. This season was broadcast on BBC One in the United Kingdom on Sunday afternoons.

On May 22, Olympic short-track speed skater Apolo Anton Ohno and Julianne Hough were crowned the champions, while NSYNC singer Joey Fatone and Kym Johnson finished in second place, and boxer Laila Ali and Maksim Chmerkovskiy finished third.

== Cast ==
=== Couples ===
This season featured eleven celebrity contestants. Actor Vincent Pastore was originally announced and partnered with Edyta Śliwińska, but pulled out after one week of rehearsals. He was replaced by John Ratzenberger.

Celebrity	Notability	Professional partner	Status
Paulina Porizkova	Supermodel	Alec Mazo	Eliminated 1st on March 26, 2007
Shandi Finnessey	Miss USA 2004	Brian Fortuna	Eliminated 2nd on April 3, 2007
Leeza Gibbons	Talk-show host	Tony Dovolani	Eliminated 3rd on April 10, 2007
Clyde Drexler	NBA player	Elena Grinenko	Eliminated 4th on April 17, 2007
Heather Mills	Model & charity campaigner	Jonathan Roberts	Eliminated 5th on April 24, 2007
John Ratzenberger	Film & television actor & author	Edyta Śliwińska	Eliminated 6th on May 1, 2007
Billy Ray Cyrus	Country music singer & actor	Karina Smirnoff	Eliminated 7th on May 8, 2007
Ian Ziering	Television actor	Cheryl Burke	Eliminated 8th on May 15, 2007
Laila Ali	Professional boxer	Maksim Chmerkovskiy	Third place on May 22, 2007
Joey Fatone	NSYNC singer & actor	Kym Johnson	Runners-up on May 22, 2007
Apolo Anton Ohno	Olympic speed skater	Julianne Hough	Winners on May 22, 2007

Future appearances

Apolo Anton Ohno and Joey Fatone returned for the All-Stars season, where Fatone was again paired with Kym Johnson and Ohno with Karina Smirnoff.

=== Hosts and judges ===
Tom Bergeron and Samantha Harris returned as co-hosts, while Carrie Ann Inaba, Len Goodman, and Bruno Tonioli returned as judges.

== Episodes ==
No. overall	No. in season	Title	Original release date	U.S. viewers (millions)
45	1	"Round 1"	March 19, 2007	21.80
46	2	"Round 2"	March 26, 2007	20.42
47	3	"Round 2 Results"	March 27, 2007	17.93
48	4	"Round 3"	April 2, 2007	18.24
49	5	"Round 3 Results"	April 3, 2007	14.99
50	6	"Round 4"	April 9, 2007	18.84
51	7	"Round 4 Results"	April 10, 2007	17.32
52	8	"Round 5"	April 16, 2007	18.87
53	9	"Round 5 Results"	April 17, 2007	16.54
54	10	"Round 6"	April 23, 2007	18.87
55	11	"Round 6 Results"	April 24, 2007	16.56
56	12	"Round 7"	April 30, 2007	18.97
57	13	"Round 7 Results"	May 1, 2007	16.26
58	14	"Round 8"	May 7, 2007	19.44
59	15	"Round 8 Results"	May 8, 2007	16.86
60	16	"Round 9"	May 14, 2007	19.58
61	17	"Round 9 Results"	April 15, 2007	18.44
62	18	"Round 10"	April 21, 2007	20.19
63	19	"Round 10 Results"	April 22, 2007	22.96

== Scoring chart ==
The highest score each week is indicated in bold green with a dagger (†), while the lowest score each week is indicated in italicized red with a double-dagger (‡).

Color key:

Winners
Runners-up
Third place
Bottom two
Eliminated

Dancing with the Stars (season 4) - Weekly scores
Couple	Pl.	Week											
Couple	Pl.	1	2	1+2	3	4	5	6	7	8	9	10	
Couple	Pl.	1	2	1+2	3	4	5	6	7	8	9	Night 1	Night 2
Apolo & Julianne	1st	21	26	47	23	26	**30**†	**28**†	26+28=54	28+30=**58**†	30+29=59 (Note: This couple was in the bottom two, but was not eliminated.)	28+30=**58**†	+30=**88**† (Note: This couple finished in first place.)
Joey & Kym	2nd	**24**†	24	48	**24**†	**28**†	25	27	29+30=**59**†	26+29=55	30+30=**60**†	26+30=56	+30=86 (Note: This couple finished in second place.)
Laila & Maks	3rd	23	**27**†	**50**†	21	21	28	**28**†	29+30=**59**†	27+26=53	30+30=**60**†	29+26=55‡	+30=85‡ (Note: This couple finished in third place.)
Ian & Cheryl	4th	21	22	43	**24**†	24	24	24	27+27=54	22+25=47	28+30=58‡ (Note: This couple was eliminated.)		
Billy Ray & Karina	5th	13‡	21	34‡	21	21	17	21	17+21=38‡	18+20=38‡			
John & Edyta	6th	17	21	38	20	16	18	19‡	23+22=45				
Heather & Jonathan	7th	18	24	42	**24**†	23	21	23					
Clyde & Elena	8th	16	18‡	34‡	16‡	15‡	13‡						
Leeza & Tony	9th	15	21	36	**24**†	16							
Shandi & Brian	10th	19	20	39	21								
Paulina & Alec	11th	19	21	40									

== Weekly scores ==
Individual judges' scores in the charts below (given in parentheses) are listed in this order from left to right: Carrie Ann Inaba, Len Goodman, Bruno Tonioli.

=== Week 1 ===
Each couple performed either the cha-cha-cha or the foxtrot. Couples are listed in the order they performed.

Couple	Scores	Dance	Music
Ian & Cheryl	21 (7, 7, 7)	Cha-cha-cha	"Mony Mony" — Billy Idol
Paulina & Alec	19 (6, 6, 7)	Foxtrot	"Too Darn Hot" — Ella Fitzgerald
Billy Ray & Karina	13 (5, 4, 4)	Cha-cha-cha	"I Want My Mullet Back" — Billy Ray Cyrus
Leeza & Tony	15 (5, 5, 5)	Foxtrot	"Strangers in the Night" — Frank Sinatra
Joey & Kym	24 (8, 8, 8)	Cha-cha-cha	"You Should Be Dancing" — Bee Gees
Laila & Maks	23 (7, 8, 8)	Foxtrot	"How Sweet It Is (To Be Loved By You)" — Marvin Gaye
John & Edyta	17 (6, 5, 6)	Cha-cha-cha	"Chain of Fools" — Aretha Franklin
Shandi & Brian	19 (6, 6, 7)	Foxtrot	"The Power of Love" — Huey Lewis and the News
Clyde & Elena	16 (6, 5, 5)	Cha-cha-cha	"I Was Made to Love Her" — Stevie Wonder
Heather & Jonathan	18 (6, 6, 6)	Foxtrot	"Cheek to Cheek" — Ella Fitzgerald
Apolo & Julianne	21 (7, 7, 7)	Cha-cha-cha	"Let's Hear It for the Boy" — Deniece Williams

=== Week 2 ===
Each couple performed either the mambo or the quickstep. Couples are listed in the order they performed.

Couple	Scores	Dance	Music	Result
Apolo & Julianne	26 (8, 9, 9)	Quickstep	"Two Hearts" — Phil Collins	Safe
Shandi & Brian	20 (6, 7, 7)	Mambo	"Right Now" — The Pussycat Dolls	Bottom two
Clyde & Elena	18 (6, 6, 6)	Quickstep	"(Your Love Keeps Lifting Me) Higher and Higher" — Jackie Wilson	Safe
Leeza & Tony	21 (7, 7, 7)	Mambo	"Independent Women Part I" — Destiny's Child	Safe
Ian & Cheryl	22 (7, 8, 7)	Quickstep	"Don't Get Me Wrong" — The Pretenders	Safe
Paulina & Alec	21 (7, 7, 7)	Mambo	"La Bamba" — Ritchie Valens	Eliminated
Billy Ray & Karina	21 (7, 7, 7)	Quickstep	"Ring of Fire" — Johnny Cash	Safe
Heather & Jonathan	24 (8, 8, 8)	Mambo	"Mambo Italiano" — Dean Martin	Safe
John & Edyta	21 (7, 7, 7)	Quickstep	"The Lady Is a Tramp" — Sammy Davis Jr.	Safe
Laila & Maks	27 (9, 9, 9)	Mambo	"Maracaibo Oriental" — Benny Moré	Safe
Joey & Kym	24 (8, 8, 8)	Quickstep	"Tell Her About It" — Billy Joel	Safe

=== Week 3 ===
Each couple performed either the jive or the tango. Couples are listed in the order they performed.

Couple	Scores	Dance	Music	Result
Shandi & Brian	21 (7, 7, 7)	Jive	"Crocodile Rock" — Elton John	Eliminated
John & Edyta	20 (7, 6, 7)	Tango	"Libertango" — Astor Piazolla	Safe
Clyde & Elena	16 (6, 5, 5)	Jive	"Bad Moon Rising" — Creedence Clearwater Revival	Safe
Laila & Maks	21 (7, 7, 7)	Tango	"Goldfinger" — Shirley Bassey	Safe
Apolo & Julianne	23 (7, 8, 8)	Jive	"You Never Can Tell" — Chuck Berry	Safe
Joey & Kym	24 (8, 8, 8)	Tango	"Star Wars Theme/Cantina Band" — Meco	Safe
Ian & Cheryl	24 (8, 8, 8)	Jive	"Hard Headed Woman" — Elvis Presley	Safe
Leeza & Tony	24 (8, 8, 8)	Tango	"Jealousy" — Billy Fury	Bottom two
Heather & Jonathan	24 (8, 8, 8)	Jive	"Can I Get a Witness" — Marvin Gaye	Safe
Billy Ray & Karina	21 (7, 7, 7)	Tango	"Rock the Casbah" — The Clash	Safe

=== Week 4 ===
Each couple performed either the paso doble or the waltz. Couples are listed in the order they performed.

Couple	Scores	Dance	Music	Result
Laila & Maks	21 (7, 7, 7)	Paso doble	"Les toreadors" — Georges Bizet	Safe
Apolo & Julianne	26 (9, 8, 9)	Waltz	"If You Don't Know Me by Now" — Simply Red	Safe
Leeza & Tony	16 (6, 5, 5)	Paso doble	"You Give Love a Bad Name" — Bon Jovi	Eliminated
Ian & Cheryl	24 (7, 9, 8)	Waltz	"He Was Beautiful" — Shirley Bassey	Safe
John & Edyta	16 (6, 5, 5)	Paso doble	"A Kind of Magic" — Queen	Bottom two
Clyde & Elena	15 (6, 4, 5)	Waltz	"Foolish" — Johnny Mathis	Safe
Billy Ray & Karina	21 (7, 7, 7)	Paso doble	"Black Betty" — Ram Jam	Safe
Heather & Jonathan	23 (7, 8, 8)	Waltz	"Sandy's Song" — Dolly Parton	Safe
Joey & Kym	28 (10, 9, 9)	Paso doble	"Collecting the Ballots" — James Horner	Safe

=== Week 5 ===
Each couple performed either the rumba or the samba. Couples are listed in the order they performed.

Couple	Scores	Dance	Music	Result
Ian & Cheryl	24 (8, 8, 8)	Samba	"Dance Like This" — Wyclef Jean, feat. Claudette Ortiz	Safe
Clyde & Elena	13 (4, 5, 4)	Rumba	"What's Going On" — Marvin Gaye	Eliminated
Heather & Jonathan	21 (7, 7, 7)	Samba	"Heaven Must Be Missing an Angel" — Tavares	Bottom two
Joey & Kym	25 (8, 8, 9)	Rumba	"Besame Mucho" — Consuelo Velázquez	Safe
John & Edyta	18 (6, 6, 6)	Samba	"Love Is in the Air" — John Paul Young	Safe
Laila & Maks	28 (9, 10, 9)	Rumba	"Put Your Records On" — Corrine Bailey Rae	Safe
Apolo & Julianne	30 (10, 10, 10)	Samba	"I Like to Move It" — Reel 2 Real	Safe
Billy Ray & Karina	17 (6, 6, 5)	Rumba	"What's Love Got to Do with It" — Tina Turner	Safe

=== Week 6 ===
Each couple performed one unlearned dance and a swing group dance. Couples are listed in the order they performed.

Couple	Scores	Dance	Music	Result
Joey & Kym	27 (9, 9, 9)	Samba	"A Little Respect" — Erasure	Safe
Heather & Jonathan	23 (7, 8, 8)	Paso doble	"Don't Cry For Me Argentina" — Julie Covington	Eliminated
John & Edyta	19 (7, 6, 6)	Mambo	"Mambo Swing" — Big Bad Voodoo Daddy	Bottom two
Laila & Maks	28 (9, 9, 10)	Cha-cha-cha	"Hold On, I'm Comin'" — Sam & Dave	Safe
Billy Ray & Karina	21 (7, 7, 7)	Jive	"I Love to Boogie" — T. Rex	Safe
Apolo & Julianne	28 (9, 9, 10)	Rumba	"Cool" — Gwen Stefani	Safe
Ian & Cheryl	24 (8, 8, 8)	Paso doble	"Waiting for Tonight" — Jennifer Lopez	Safe
Apolo & Julianne Billy Ray & Karina Heather & Jonathan Ian & Cheryl Joey & Kym John & Edyta Laila & Maks	No scores received	Group; Swing	"Rock This Town" — Brian Setzer Orchestra	

=== Week 7 ===
Each couple performed two unlearned dances. Couples are listed in the order they performed.

Couple	Scores	Dance	Music	Result
Laila & Maks	29 (10, 9, 10)	Quickstep	"Part-Time Lover" — Stevie Wonder	Safe
Laila & Maks	30 (10, 10, 10)	Samba	"Brazil" — Johnny Mathis	Safe
John & Edyta	23 (8, 7, 8)	Foxtrot	"That's Life" — Frank Sinatra	Eliminated
John & Edyta	22 (7, 8, 7)	Rumba	"Under Pressure" — Queen & David Bowie	Eliminated
Apolo & Julianne	26 (9, 8, 9)	Foxtrot	"Steppin' Out with My Baby" — Dinah Shore	Safe
Apolo & Julianne	28 (9, 9, 10)	Mambo	"Dr. Beat" — Miami Sound Machine	Safe
Ian & Cheryl	27 (9, 9, 9)	Tango	"Holding Out for a Hero" — Bonnie Tyler	Safe
Ian & Cheryl	27 (9, 9, 9)	Mambo	"Gimme the Light" — Sean Paul	Safe
Billy Ray & Karina	17 (5, 6, 6)	Waltz	"Play Me" — Neil Diamond	Bottom two
Billy Ray & Karina	21 (7, 7, 7)	Samba	"Living in America" — James Brown	Bottom two
Joey & Kym	29 (10, 9, 10)	Foxtrot	"The Way You Make Me Feel" — Paul Anka	Safe
Joey & Kym	30 (10, 10, 10)	Jive	"Slippin' and Slidin'" — Little Richard	Safe

=== Week 8 ===
Each couple performed two unlearned dances. Couples are listed in the order they performed.

Couple	Scores	Dance	Music	Result
Ian & Cheryl	22 (8, 7, 7)	Foxtrot	"Baby, It's Cold Outside" — Tom Jones	Safe
Ian & Cheryl	25 (8, 8, 9)	Rumba	"Imagine" — John Lennon	Safe
Joey & Kym	26 (9, 9, 8)	Waltz	"Always" — Frank Sinatra	Bottom two
Joey & Kym	29 (10, 9, 10)	Mambo	"Pump It" — The Black Eyed Peas	Bottom two
Billy Ray & Karina	18 (7, 6, 5)	Foxtrot	"Stand by Your Man" — Tammy Wynette	Eliminated
Billy Ray & Karina	20 (6, 7, 7)	Mambo	"My Way" — Los Lonely Boys	Eliminated
Laila & Maks	27 (9, 9, 9)	Waltz	"May Each Day" — Andy Williams	Safe
Laila & Maks	26 (9, 8, 9)	Jive	"Bad, Bad Leroy Brown" — Jim Croce	Safe
Apolo & Julianne	28 (10, 8, 10)	Tango	"Jessie's Girl" — Rick Springfield	Safe
Apolo & Julianne	30 (10, 10, 10)	Paso doble	"Carnaval de Paris" — Dario G	Safe

=== Week 9 ===
Each couple performed two dances. Couples are listed in the order they performed.

Couple	Scores	Dance	Music	Result
Apolo & Julianne	30 (10, 10, 10)	Quickstep	"Mr. Pinstripe Suit" — Big Bad Voodoo Daddy	Bottom two
Apolo & Julianne	29 (10, 9, 10)	Cha-cha-cha	"Push It" — Salt-N-Pepa	Bottom two
Ian & Cheryl	28 (9, 10, 9)	Tango	"Maneater" — Nelly Furtado	Eliminated
Ian & Cheryl	30 (10, 10, 10)	Jive	"All Shook Up" — Elvis Presley	Eliminated
Laila & Maks	30 (10, 10, 10)	Quickstep	"Walk Like an Egyptian" — The Bangles	Safe
Laila & Maks	30 (10, 10, 10)	Cha-cha-cha	"She's a Lady" — Tom Jones	Safe
Joey & Kym	30 (10, 10, 10)	Foxtrot	"My Guy" — Mary Wells	Safe
Joey & Kym	30 (10, 10, 10)	Jive	"Jump, Jive an' Wail" — The Brian Setzer Orchestra	Safe

=== Week 10 ===
Each couple performed two dances, plus a freestyle. Couples are listed in the order they performed.

Couple	Scores	Dance	Music	Result
Laila & Maks	29 (10, 9, 10)	Paso doble	"España cañí" — Erich Kunzel	Third place
Laila & Maks	26 (9, 8, 9)	Freestyle	"Shake Your Body (Down to the Ground)" — The Jacksons	Third place
Laila & Maks	30 (10, 10, 10)	Mambo	"Maracaibo Oriental" — Benny Moré	Third place
Apolo & Julianne	28 (9, 9, 10)	Rumba	"Midnight Train to Georgia" — Gladys Knight & the Pips	Winners
Apolo & Julianne	30 (10, 10, 10)	Freestyle	"Bust a Move" — Young MC	Winners
Apolo & Julianne	30 (10, 10, 10)	Paso doble	"Carnaval de Paris" — Dario G	Winners
Joey & Kym	26 (9, 8, 9)	Cha-cha-cha	"Groove Is in the Heart" — Deee-Lite	Runners-up
Joey & Kym	30 (10, 10, 10)	Freestyle	"Last Dance" — Donna Summer	Runners-up
Joey & Kym	30 (10, 10, 10)	Tango	"Star Wars Theme/Cantina Band" — Meco	Runners-up

== Dance chart ==
The couples performed the following each week:

- Week 1: One unlearned dance (cha-cha-cha or foxtrot)
- Week 2: One unlearned dance (mambo or quickstep)
- Week 3: One unlearned dance (jive or tango)
- Week 4: One unlearned dance (paso doble or waltz)
- Week 5: One unlearned dance (rumba or samba)
- Week 6: One unlearned dance & group swing dance
- Week 7: Two unlearned dances
- Week 8: Two unlearned dances
- Week 9: One unlearned dance & redemption dance
- Week 10 (Night 1): Redemption dance & freestyle
- Week 10 (Night 2): Favorite dance of the season

Color key:

No scores received

Dancing with the Stars (season 4) - Dance chart
Couple	Week															
Couple	1	2	3	4	5	6		7		8		9		10		
Couple	1	2	3	4	5	6		7		8		9		Night 1		Night 2
Apolo & Julianne	Cha-cha-cha	Quickstep	Jive	Waltz	Samba	Rumba	Group; Swing (Note: No scores were received for this dance.)	Foxtrot	Mambo	Tango	Paso doble	Quickstep	Cha-cha-cha	Rumba	Freestyle	Paso doble
Joey & Kym	Cha-cha-cha	Quickstep	Tango	Paso doble	Rumba	Samba	Group; Swing	Foxtrot	Jive	Waltz	Mambo	Foxtrot	Jive	Cha-cha-cha	Freestyle	Tango
Laila & Maks	Foxtrot	Mambo	Tango	Paso doble	Rumba	Cha-cha-cha	Group; Swing	Quickstep	Samba	Waltz	Jive	Quickstep	Cha-cha-cha	Paso doble	Freestyle	Mambo
Ian & Cheryl	Cha-cha-cha	Quickstep	Jive	Waltz	Samba	Paso doble	Group; Swing	Tango	Mambo	Foxtrot	Rumba	Tango	Jive			
Billy Ray & Karina	Cha-cha-cha	Quickstep	Tango	Paso doble	Rumba	Jive	Group; Swing	Waltz	Samba	Foxtrot	Mambo					
John & Edyta	Cha-cha-cha	Quickstep	Tango	Paso doble	Samba	Mambo	Group; Swing	Foxtrot	Rumba							
Heather & Jonathan	Foxtrot	Mambo	Jive	Waltz	Samba	Paso doble	Group; Swing									
Clyde & Elena	Cha-cha-cha	Quickstep	Jive	Waltz	Rumba											
Leeza & Tony	Foxtrot	Mambo	Tango	Paso doble												
Shandi & Brian	Foxtrot	Mambo	Jive													
Paulina & Alec	Foxtrot	Mambo														
