= Dancing with the Stars (American TV series) season 15 =

Dancing with the Stars: All-Stars
- Season 15
- Promotional poster, featuring All-Star celebrity cast
- Hosted by: Tom Bergeron; Brooke Burke Charvet
- Judges: Carrie Ann Inaba; Len Goodman; Bruno Tonioli
- Celebrity winner: Melissa Rycroft
- Professional winner: Tony Dovolani
- No. of episodes: 19

Release
- Original network: ABC
- Original release: September 24 – November 27, 2012

Season chronology
- ← Previous; Season 14 Next → Season 16

Season fifteen of Dancing with the Stars, called Dancing with the Stars: All-Stars, premiered on September 24, 2012, on the ABC network.

Season 15 was the first to feature an "all-star" cast of returning celebrities. Six of the returning finalists had already won the title in prior seasons: Kelly Monaco, Drew Lachey, Emmitt Smith, Apolo Anton Ohno, Hélio Castroneves, and Shawn Johnson. Additionally, it was the only season to date to offer fractional (0.5) scores. Five contestants reunited with their original partners (Emmitt Smith, Joey Fatone, Melissa Rycroft, Bristol Palin, Kirstie Alley), while the other eight danced with new partners.

Season 8 finalist Melissa Rycroft defeated season 8 champion Shawn Johnson and season 1 champion Kelly Monaco to win the trophy. This also marked the first win for professional Tony Dovolani.

== Cast ==
=== Couples ===
This season featured thirteen returning celebrity contestants. The first twelve celebrities were revealed on July 27, 2012. A thirteenth contestant was chosen by the public, from either Sabrina Bryan, Kyle Massey, or Carson Kressley. Sabrina Bryan was announced the winner on August 27. Louis van Amstel was partnered with Bryan, while the professional partners for the first twelve celebrities were revealed on August 13. The members of the dance troupe for this season were Oksana Dmytrenko, Emma Slater, Sharna Burgess, Henry Byalikov, Sasha Farber, and Sonny Fredie-Pedersen.

Celebrity	Notability	Professional partner	Status
Pamela Anderson Season 10	Film & television actress	Tristan MacManus	Eliminated 1st on September 25, 2012
Joey Fatone Season 4	NSYNC singer & actor	Kym Johnson	Eliminated 2nd on October 2, 2012
Drew Lachey Season 2	Singer & actor	Anna Trebunskaya	Eliminated 3rd on October 9, 2012
Hélio Castroneves Season 5	Indy 500 champion	Chelsie Hightower	Eliminated 4th on October 9, 2012
Bristol Palin Season 11	Activist & author	Mark Ballas	Eliminated 5th on October 16, 2012
Sabrina Bryan Season 5	Singer & actress	Louis van Amstel	Eliminated 6th on October 30, 2012
Kirstie Alley Season 12	Film & television actress	Maksim Chmerkovskiy	Eliminated 7th on November 13, 2012
Gilles Marini Season 8	Film & television actor	Peta Murgatroyd	Eliminated 8th on November 13, 2012
Apolo Anton Ohno Season 4	Olympic speed skater	Karina Smirnoff	Eliminated 9th on November 20, 2012
Emmitt Smith Season 3	NFL player	Cheryl Burke	Eliminated 10th on November 20, 2012
Kelly Monaco Season 1	Model & actress	Valentin Chmerkovskiy	Third place on November 27, 2012
Shawn Johnson Season 8	Olympic artistic gymnast	Derek Hough; Mark Ballas (Week 7)	Runners-up on November 27, 2012
Melissa Rycroft Season 8	Television host	Tony Dovolani	Winners on November 27, 2012

=== Host and judges ===
Tom Bergeron and Brooke Burke Charvet returned as hosts, while Carrie Ann Inaba, Len Goodman, and Bruno Tonioli returned as judges. The Harold Wheeler orchestra and singers provided music throughout the season.

== Scoring chart ==
The highest score each week is indicated in bold green with a dagger (†), while the lowest score each week is indicated in italicized red with a double-dagger (‡).

Color key:

Winners
Runners-up
Third place
Bottom two
Eliminated

Dancing with the Stars (season 15) - Weekly scores
Couple	Pl.	Week												
Couple	Pl.	1	2	3	4	5	6	5+6	7	8	7+8	9	10	
Couple	Pl.	1	2	3	4	5	6	5+6	7	8	7+8	9	Night 1	Night 2
Melissa & Tony	1st	21.0	23.5	**27.0**†	37.0	27.0+29.5=56.5	29.5	86.0	29.0+10=**39.0**†	30.0+30.0=**60.0**†	**99.0**†	27.5+30.0=57.5	30.0+30.0=**60.0**†	+28.5=**88.5**† (Note: This couple finished in first place.)
Shawn & Derek	2nd	22.0	25.0	26.5	**39.5**†	27.0+29.5=56.5	28.0	84.5	30.0+8=38.0	29.5+26.0=55.5	93.5	30.0+29.0=**59.0**†	27.0+30.0=57.0‡	+30.0=87.0‡ (Note: This couple finished in second place.)
Kelly & Val	3rd	21.5	22.0	**27.0**†	37.5	24.5+27.0=51.5‡	27.0	78.5‡	27.0+9=36.0	28.0+28.5=56.5	92.5	25.5+28.5=54.0‡	29.5+29.5=59.0	+28.5=87.5 (Note: This couple finished in third place.)
Emmitt & Cheryl	4th	**24.5**†	22.5	25.0	36.0	29.0+27.0=56.0	26.5‡	82.5	27.5+7=34.5	28.0+30.0=58.0	92.5	27.0+27.0=54.0‡ (Note: This couple was eliminated.)		
Apolo & Karina	5th	22.0	24.5	25.5	34.5	27.0+29.5=56.5	**30.0**†	86.5	27.0+6=33.0	29.5+29.0=58.5	91.5	27.0+30.0=57.0		
Gilles & Peta	6th	24.0	25.5	25.5	**39.5**†	29.5+27.0=56.5	27.5	84.0	28.5+5=33.5	29.5+29.0=58.5	92.0			
Kirstie & Maks	7th	19.0	21.0	24.0 (Note: This couple was in the bottom two, but was not eliminated.)	30.0‡	25.5+27.0=52.5	27.5+2=29.5	82.0	24.0+4=28.0‡	27.0+24.0=51.0‡	79.0‡			
Sabrina & Louis	8th	22.5	**26.0**†	25.5	35.5	29.0+29.5=**58.5**†	**30.0**†	**88.5**†						
Bristol & Mark	9th	19.5	18.0‡	22.5‡	32.0									
Hélio & Chelsie	10th	21.5	23.0	25.5										
Drew & Anna	11th	21.5	22.5	24.0										
Joey & Kym	12th	20.5	22.5											
Pamela & Tristan	13th	17.0‡												

== Weekly scores ==
=== Week 1: First Dances ===
Couples performed either the cha-cha-cha or foxtrot, and are listed in the order they performed.

Couple	Scores			Total score	Dance	Music	Result
Couple	Inaba	Goodman	Tonioli	Total score	Dance	Music	Result
Joey & Kym	6.5	7.0	7.0	20.5	Cha-cha-cha	"P.Y.T. (Pretty Young Thing)" — Michael Jackson	Safe
Shawn & Derek	8.0	6.5	7.5	22.0	Foxtrot	"Good Time" — Owl City & Carly Rae Jepsen	Safe
Sabrina & Louis	7.5	7.5	7.5	22.5	Cha-cha-cha	"What Makes You Beautiful" — One Direction	Safe
Hélio & Chelsie	7.0	7.5	7.0	21.5	Foxtrot	"Pride and Joy" — Marvin Gaye	Safe
Pamela & Tristan	5.5	5.5	6.0	17.0	Cha-cha-cha	"You Know I'm No Good" — Amy Winehouse	Eliminated
Melissa & Tony	7.0	7.0	7.0	21.0	Foxtrot	"Big Spender" — from Sweet Charity	Safe
Apolo & Karina	7.5	7.0	7.5	22.0	Cha-cha-cha	"Party Rock Anthem" — LMFAO, feat. Lauren Bennett & GoonRock	Safe
Gilles & Peta	8.0	8.0	8.0	24.0	Foxtrot	"Call Me Irresponsible" — Bobby Darin	Safe
Bristol & Mark	6.5	6.5	6.5	19.5	Cha-cha-cha	"Blow Me (One Last Kiss)" — Pink	Safe
Drew & Anna	7.0	7.0	7.5	21.5	Foxtrot	"Love Song" — Sara Bareilles	Bottom two
Kelly & Val	7.0	7.0	7.5	21.5	Cha-cha-cha	"Bang Bang" — David Sanborn	Safe
Kirstie & Maks	6.5	6.0	6.5	19.0	Foxtrot	"Set Fire to the Rain" — Adele	Safe
Emmitt & Cheryl	8.0	8.5	8.0	24.5	Cha-cha-cha	"Chain of Fools" — Aretha Franklin	Safe

=== Week 2: Top 12 ===
Couples performed either the jive or quickstep, and are listed in the order they performed.

Couple	Scores			Total score	Dance	Music	Result
Couple	Inaba	Goodman	Tonioli	Total score	Dance	Music	Result
Melissa & Tony	8.0	8.0	7.5	23.5	Jive	"Shout" — The Isley Brothers	Safe
Bristol & Mark	6.0	6.0	6.0	18.0	Quickstep	"Redneck Woman" — Gretchen Wilson	Safe
Hélio & Chelsie	8.0	7.5	7.5	23.0	Jive	"Everybody Talks" — Neon Trees	Bottom two
Apolo & Karina	8.5	8.0	8.0	24.5	Quickstep	"Five Months, Two Weeks, Two Days" — Louis Prima	Safe
Sabrina & Louis	9.0	8.5	8.5	26.0	Quickstep	"Black Betty" — Ram Jam	Safe
Kirstie & Maks	7.0	7.0	7.0	21.0	Jive	"Non, non, rien n'a changé" — Les Poppys	Safe
Emmitt & Cheryl	7.5	7.5	7.5	22.5	Quickstep	"A Cool Cat In Town" — Tape Five	Safe
Drew & Anna	7.5	7.5	7.5	22.5	Jive	"Dance, Dance" — Fall Out Boy	Safe
Joey & Kym	7.5	7.5	7.5	22.5	Quickstep	"Creep" — Richard Cheese	Eliminated
Shawn & Derek	8.5	8.5	8.5	25.5	Jive	"The Nicest Kids in Town" — from Hairspray	Safe
Kelly & Val	7.5	7.0	7.5	22.0	Quickstep	"Who Says" — Selena Gomez & The Scene	Safe
Gilles & Peta	8.5	8.5	8.5	25.5	Jive	"Don't Stop Me Now" — Queen	Safe

=== Week 3: Iconic Dances Week ===
Celebrities chose an iconic routine from the previous fourteen seasons and tried to make it as "iconic" as it previously had been. Couples are listed in the order they performed. There was a double elimination this week.

Couple	Scores			Total score	Dance	Music	Original couple	Result
Couple	Inaba	Goodman	Tonioli	Total score	Dance	Music	Original couple	Result
Drew & Anna	8.0	8.0	8.0	24.0	Cha-cha-cha	"Crazy in Love" — Beyoncé, feat. Jay-Z	Joey & Ashly (Season 1)	Eliminated
Gilles & Peta	8.5	8.5	8.5	25.5	Tango	"Sweet Dreams (Are Made of This)" — Eurythmics	Erin & Maks (Season 10)	Safe
Melissa & Tony	9.0	9.0	9.0	27.0	Samba	"Conga" — Gloria Estefan	JR & Karina (Season 13)	Safe
Apolo & Karina	9.0	8.0	8.5	25.5	Foxtrot	"Fever" — Michael Bublé	Gilles & Cheryl (Season 8)	Safe
Kelly & Val	9.0	9.0	9.0	27.0	Paso doble	"España cañí" — Erich Kunzel	Laila & Maks (Season 4)	Safe
Kirstie & Maks	8.0	8.0	8.0	24.0	Cha-cha-cha	"Moves like Jagger" — Maroon 5, feat. Christina Aguilera	Carson & Anna (Season 13)	Bottom two
Sabrina & Louis	8.5	8.5	8.5	25.5	Paso doble	"Free Your Mind" — En Vogue	Mel B & Maks (Season 5)	Bottom two
Emmitt & Cheryl	8.5	8.0	8.5	25.0	Paso doble	"Canción del Mariachi" — Los Lobos & Antonio Banderas	Mario & Karina (Season 3)	Safe
Hélio & Chelsie	8.5	8.5	8.5	25.5	Quickstep	"Mr. Pinstripe Suit" — Big Bad Voodoo Daddy	Apolo & Julianne (Season 4)	Eliminated
Bristol & Mark	7.5	7.5	7.5	22.5	Paso doble	"Living on Video" — Trans-X	Joanna & Derek (Season 9)	Safe
Shawn & Derek	9.0	8.0	9.5	26.5	Quickstep	"Hey! Pachuco!" — Royal Crown Revue	Hélio & Julianne (Season 5)	Safe

=== Week 4: Opponents' Choice Week ===
All of the celebrities selected a dance style for one of their opponents. Paula Abdul served as guest judge. Couples are listed in the order they performed.

Couple	Scores				Total score	Dance	Chosen by	Music	Result
Couple	Inaba	Goodman	Abdul	Tonioli	Total score	Dance	Chosen by	Music	Result
Kirstie & Maks	7.5	7.5	7.5	7.5	30.0	Charleston	Sabrina & Louis	"42nd Street" — from 42nd Street	Bottom two
Bristol & Mark	8.0	8.0	8.0	8.0	32.0	Rock and Roll	Gilles & Peta	"At the Hop" — Danny and the Juniors	Eliminated
Sabrina & Louis	9.0	9.0	8.5	9.0	35.5	Disco	Kirstie & Maks	"You Should Be Dancing" — Bee Gees	Safe
Emmitt & Cheryl	9.0	9.0	9.0	9.0	36.0	Bolero	Kelly & Val	"Better in Time" — Leona Lewis	Safe
Gilles & Peta	10.0	9.5	10.0	10.0	39.5	Bollywood	Bristol & Mark	"Jai Ho (You Are My Destiny)" — The Pussycat Dolls, feat. A. R. Rahman	Safe
Melissa & Tony	9.0	9.0	9.5	9.5	37.0	Jitterbug	Apolo & Karina	"This Cat's on a Hot Tin Roof" — Brian Setzer Orchestra	Safe
Shawn & Derek	10.0	9.5	10.0	10.0	39.5	Mambo	Hélio & Chelsie	"Para los Rumberos" — Santana	Safe
Apolo & Karina	8.5	9.0	8.5	8.5	34.5	Hip-hop	Melissa & Tony	"Poison" — Bell Biv DeVoe	Safe
Kelly & Val	9.0	9.5	9.5	9.5	37.5	Contemporary	Emmitt & Cheryl	"Fix You" — Coldplay	Safe

=== Week 5: Guilty Pleasures Week ===
The two couples with the highest total cumulative point average became team captains and selected teams for the Team Freestyle. The captains were Gilles & Peta and Shawn & Derek. Due to a presidential debate on October 22, this week of competition consisted of two performance shows: October 22 and 23. There was no elimination. Couples are listed in the order they performed.

Night 1

Couple	Scores			Total score	Dance	Music
Couple	Inaba	Goodman	Tonioli	Total score	Dance	Music
Kelly & Val	8.0	8.0	8.5	24.5	Samba	"Want U Back" — Cher Lloyd
Gilles & Peta	10.0	9.5	10.0	29.5	Rumba	"I Will Always Love You" — Whitney Houston
Kirstie & Maks	8.5	8.5	8.5	25.5	Quickstep	"Mrs. Robinson" — Simon and Garfunkel
Emmitt & Cheryl	9.5	9.5	10.0	29.0	Samba	"Copacabana" — Barry Manilow
Apolo & Karina Melissa & Tony Sabrina & Louis Shawn & Derek	9.5	10.0	10.0	29.5	Freestyle (Team Call Me Maybe)	"Call Me Maybe" — Carly Rae Jepsen

Night 2

Couple	Scores			Total score	Dance	Music
Couple	Inaba	Goodman	Tonioli	Total score	Dance	Music
Melissa & Tony	9.0	9.0	9.0	27.0	Tango	"Toxic" — Britney Spears
Shawn & Derek	9.0	8.0	10.0	27.0	Rumba	"My Heart Will Go On" — Celine Dion
Apolo & Karina	8.5	9.5	9.0	27.0	Samba	"Give It to Me Baby" — Rick James
Sabrina & Louis	10.0	9.5	9.5	29.0	Waltz	"So This is Love" — from Cinderella
Emmitt & Cheryl Gilles & Peta Kelly & Val Kirstie & Maks	9.0	9.0	9.0	27.0	Freestyle (Team Gangnam Style)	"Gangnam Style" — Psy

=== Week 6: Country Week ===
Each couple danced to a country song. Each individual routine included a solo portion by the celebrity. All of the couples also did a group dance. The couple that impressed the judges the most received two bonus points; that was Kirstie & Maks. Couples are listed in the order they performed.

Couple	Scores			Total score	Dance	Music	Result
Couple	Inaba	Goodman	Tonioli	Total score	Dance	Music	Result
Gilles & Peta	9.0	9.0	9.5	27.5	Cha-cha-cha	"Man! I Feel Like a Woman!" — Shania Twain	Safe
Sabrina & Louis	10.0	10.0	10.0	30.0	Rumba	"Wanted" — Hunter Hayes	Eliminated
Kelly & Val	9.0	9.0	9.0	27.0	Tango	"Good Girl" — Carrie Underwood	Safe
Melissa & Tony	9.5	10.0	10.0	29.5	Viennese waltz	"Why Ya Wanna" — Jana Kramer	Safe
Shawn & Derek	9.5	8.5	10.0	28.0	Cha-cha-cha	"She Thinks My Tractor's Sexy" — Kenny Chesney	Safe
Kirstie & Maks	9.5	8.5	9.5	27.5	Rumba	"Home" — Blake Shelton	Safe
Apolo & Karina	10.0	10.0	10.0	30.0	Viennese waltz	"Skin (Sarabeth)" — Rascal Flatts	Safe
Emmitt & Cheryl	8.5	8.5	9.5	26.5	Foxtrot	"Islands in the Stream" — Dolly Parton & Kenny Rogers	Safe
Apolo & Karina Emmitt & Cheryl Gilles & Peta Kelly & Val Melissa & Tony Sabrina & Louis Shawn & Derek	No scores received				Group; Freestyle	"Save a Horse (Ride a Cowboy)" — Big & Rich & "I Play Chicken with a Train" — Cowboy Troy	

=== Week 7: Dance Fusion Week ===
Each couple performed a fusion dance of two previously learned dance styles, followed by a swing dance marathon. Due to the presidential election and the effects of Hurricane Sandy for East Coast viewers, no elimination took place. Mark Ballas performed with Shawn Johnson this week, because Derek Hough was out with an injury. Couples are listed in the order they performed.

Couple	Scores			Total score	Dance	Music
Couple	Inaba	Goodman	Tonioli	Total score	Dance	Music
Apolo & Karina	9.0	9.0	9.0	27.0	Cha-cha-cha & Paso doble	"Scream" — Usher
Emmitt & Cheryl	8.5	9.5	9.5	27.5	Rumba & Samba	"Fine By Me" — Andy Grammer
Kirstie & Maks	8.0	8.0	8.0	24.0	Quickstep & Samba	"Sir Duke" — Stevie Wonder
Kelly & Val	9.0	9.0	9.0	27.0	Cha-cha-cha & Foxtrot	"Don't Stop" — Gin Wigmore
Melissa & Tony	10.0	9.5	9.5	29.0	Cha-cha-cha & Tango	"Die Young" — Ke$ha
Shawn & Mark	10.0	10.0	10.0	30.0	Paso doble & Tango	"Livin' On A Prayer" — Bon Jovi
Gilles & Peta	9.5	9.5	9.5	28.5	Argentine tango & Samba	"When I Get You Alone" — Robin Thicke
Kirstie & Maks	4				Swing; Marathon	"Do Your Thing" — Basement Jaxx
Gilles & Peta	5				Swing; Marathon	"Do Your Thing" — Basement Jaxx
Apolo & Karina	6				Swing; Marathon	"Do Your Thing" — Basement Jaxx
Emmitt & Cheryl	7				Swing; Marathon	"Do Your Thing" — Basement Jaxx
Shawn & Mark	8				Swing; Marathon	"Do Your Thing" — Basement Jaxx
Kelly & Val	9				Swing; Marathon	"Do Your Thing" — Basement Jaxx
Melissa & Tony	10				Swing; Marathon	"Do Your Thing" — Basement Jaxx

=== Week 8: Veterans Day/Trio Week ===
In honor of Veterans Day, the first round featured performances to songs that pay homage to servicemen and women. Each couple also selected one professional who had either been previously eliminated or had participated in the dance troupe to perform with them in their Latin routine. There was a double elimination. Couples are listed in the order they performed.

Couple	Trio partner	Scores			Total score	Dance	Music	Result
Couple	Trio partner	Inaba	Goodman	Tonioli	Total score	Dance	Music	Result
Shawn & Derek	Mark Ballas	10.0	9.5	10.0	29.5	Viennese waltz	"Angel" — Sarah McLachlan	Safe
Shawn & Derek	Mark Ballas	10.0	7.0	9.0	26.0	Samba	"Jungle Jazz" — Les Tambours du Bronx	Safe
Apolo & Karina	Sasha Farber	10.0	9.5	10.0	29.5	Tango	"Holding Out for a Hero" — Bonnie Tyler	Safe
Apolo & Karina	Sasha Farber	9.5	9.5	10.0	29.0	Jive	"Greased Lightnin'" — John Travolta	Safe
Kirstie & Maks	Tristan MacManus	9.0	9.0	9.0	27.0	Viennese waltz	"Hallelujah" — Leonard Cohen	Eliminated
Kirstie & Maks	Tristan MacManus	8.0	8.0	8.0	24.0	Paso doble	"Bring Me to Life" — Evanescence	Eliminated
Kelly & Val	Louis van Amstel	9.5	9.0	9.5	28.0	Viennese waltz	"I'll Be" — Edwin McCain	Safe
Kelly & Val	Louis van Amstel	9.5	9.5	9.5	28.5	Jive	"Animal" — Neon Trees	Safe
Gilles & Peta	Chelsie Hightower	9.5	10.0	10.0	29.5	Quickstep	"Danger Zone" — Kenny Loggins	Eliminated
Gilles & Peta	Chelsie Hightower	9.5	10.0	9.5	29.0	Salsa	"La Rebelión" — Joe Arroyo	Eliminated
Emmitt & Cheryl	Kym Johnson	9.0	9.5	9.5	28.0	Viennese waltz	"Love Letters" — Ketty Lester	Safe
Emmitt & Cheryl	Kym Johnson	10.0	10.0	10.0	30.0	Salsa	"Mr. Saxobeat" — Alexandra Stan	Safe
Melissa & Tony	Henry Byalikov	10.0	10.0	10.0	30.0	Quickstep	"Boogie Woogie Bugle Boy" — The Andrews Sisters	Safe
Melissa & Tony	Henry Byalikov	10.0	10.0	10.0	30.0	Paso doble	"Rumour Has It" — Adele	Safe

=== Week 9: Semifinals ===
The couples performed one unlearned dance to a song from Michael Jackson's album Bad and one dance chosen by the other couples. This was another double elimination this week. Couples are listed in the order they performed.

Couple	Scores			Total score	Dance & Theme	Music	Result
Couple	Inaba	Goodman	Tonioli	Total score	Dance & Theme	Music	Result
Melissa & Tony	9.0	9.5	9.0	27.5	"Caveman" Hustle	"Walk the Dinosaur" — Was (Not Was)	Safe
Melissa & Tony	10.0	10.0	10.0	30.0	Argentine tango	"Dirty Diana" — Michael Jackson	Safe
Shawn & Derek	10.0	10.0	10.0	30.0	"Knight Rider" Bhangra	"Mundian to Bach Ke" — Panjabi MC	Safe
Shawn & Derek	9.0	10.0	10.0	29.0	Argentine tango	"Bad" — Michael Jackson	Safe
Apolo & Karina	8.5	9.0	9.5	27.0	"Big Top" Jazz	"What You Waiting For?" — Gwen Stefani	Eliminated
Apolo & Karina	10.0	10.0	10.0	30.0	Rumba	"Man in the Mirror" — Michael Jackson	Eliminated
Emmitt & Cheryl	9.0	9.0	9.0	27.0	"Espionage" Lindy Hop	"Secret Agent Man" — Johnny Rivers	Eliminated
Emmitt & Cheryl	9.0	9.0	9.0	27.0	Tango	"Leave Me Alone" — Michael Jackson	Eliminated
Kelly & Val	8.0	9.0	8.5	25.5	"Surfer" Flamenco	"Malagueña" — Brian Setzer	Safe
Kelly & Val	9.5	9.5	9.5	28.5	Rumba	"I Just Can't Stop Loving You" — Michael Jackson	Safe

=== Week 10: Finals ===
On the first night, each couple performed their favorite dance of the season and a super-sized freestyle routine. On the second night, they performed an instant dance in which they had to choose their dance style and music that night. Couples are listed in the order they performed.

Night 1

Couple	Scores			Total score	Dance	Music
Couple	Inaba	Goodman	Tonioli	Total score	Dance	Music
Kelly & Val	9.5	10.0	10.0	29.5	Paso doble	"España cañí" — Erich Kunzel
Kelly & Val	10.0	9.5	10.0	29.5	Freestyle	"(I've Had) The Time of My Life" — Bill Medley & Jennifer Warnes
Melissa & Tony	10.0	10.0	10.0	30.0	Samba	"Conga" — Gloria Estefan
Melissa & Tony	10.0	10.0	10.0	30.0	Freestyle	"I Was Here" — Beyoncé
Shawn & Derek	9.0	8.5	9.5	27.0	Quickstep	"Hey! Pachuco!" — Royal Crown Revue
Shawn & Derek	10.0	10.0	10.0	30.0	Freestyle	"Carnaval de Paris" — Dario G

Night 2

Couple	Scores			Total score	Dance	Music	Result
Couple	Inaba	Goodman	Tonioli	Total score	Dance	Music	Result
Kelly & Val	9.5	9.5	9.5	28.5	Jive	"Cat and Mouse" — Nikki & Rich	Third place
Melissa & Tony	9.5	9.5	9.5	28.5	Samba	"Life Is a Highway" — Rascal Flatts	Winners
Shawn & Derek	10.0	10.0	10.0	30.0	Cha-cha-cha	"Respect" — Aretha Franklin	Runners-up

== Dance chart ==
The couples performed the following each week:

- Week 1: One unlearned dance (cha-cha-cha or foxtrot)
- Week 2: One unlearned dance (jive or quickstep)
- Week 3: One unlearned dance
- Week 4: One new dance style
- Week 5: One unlearned dance & team freestyle dance
- Week 6: One unlearned dance & group freestyle dance
- Week 7: Fusion dance & swing marathon
- Week 8: One unlearned dance & trio dance
- Week 9 (Semifinals): One unlearned dance & one new dance style
- Week 10 (Finals, Night 1): Favorite dance & freestyle
- Week 10 (Finals, Night 2): Instant dance

Dancing with the Stars (season 15) - Dance chart
Couple	Week																
Couple	1	2	3	4	5		6		7		8		9		10		
Couple	1	2	3	4	5		6		7		8		9		Night 1		Night 2
Melissa & Tony	Foxtrot	Jive	Samba	Jitterbug	Tango	Team Freestyle	Viennese waltz	Group; Freestyle	Cha-cha-cha & Tango	Swing; Marathon	Quickstep	Paso doble	Hustle	Argentine tango	Samba	Freestyle	Samba
Shawn & Derek	Foxtrot	Jive	Quickstep	Mambo	Rumba	Team Freestyle	Cha-cha-cha	Group; Freestyle	Paso doble & Tango	Swing; Marathon	Viennese waltz	Samba	Bhangra	Argentine tango	Quickstep	Freestyle	Cha-cha-cha
Kelly & Val	Cha-cha-cha	Quickstep	Paso doble	Contemp.	Samba	Team Freestyle	Tango	Group; Freestyle	Cha-cha-cha & Foxtrot	Swing; Marathon	Viennese waltz	Jive	Flamenco	Rumba	Paso doble	Freestyle	Jive
Emmitt & Cheryl	Cha-cha-cha	Quickstep	Paso doble	Bolero	Samba	Team Freestyle	Foxtrot	Group; Freestyle	Rumba & Samba	Swing; Marathon	Viennese waltz	Salsa	Lindy Hop	Tango			
Apolo & Karina	Cha-cha-cha	Quickstep	Foxtrot	Hip-hop	Samba	Team Freestyle	Viennese waltz	Group; Freestyle	Cha-cha-cha & Paso doble	Swing; Marathon	Tango	Jive	Jazz	Rumba			
Gilles & Peta	Foxtrot	Jive	Tango	Bollywood	Rumba	Team Freestyle	Cha-cha-cha	Group; Freestyle	Argentine tango & Samba	Swing; Marathon	Quickstep	Salsa					
Kirstie & Maks	Foxtrot	Jive	Cha-cha-cha	Charleston	Quickstep	Team Freestyle	Rumba	Group; Freestyle	Quickstep & Samba	Swing; Marathon	Viennese waltz	Paso doble					
Sabrina & Louis	Cha-cha-cha	Quickstep	Paso doble	Disco	Waltz	Team Freestyle	Rumba	Group; Freestyle									
Bristol & Mark	Cha-cha-cha	Quickstep	Paso doble	Rock and Roll													
Hélio & Chelsie	Foxtrot	Jive	Quickstep														
Drew & Anna	Foxtrot	Jive	Cha-cha-cha														
Joey & Kym	Cha-cha-cha	Quickstep															
Pamela & Tristan	Cha-cha-cha																

== Ratings ==
Show	Episode	Air date	Viewers (millions)	Rating/share (adults 18–49)	Rating/share (household)	Note
1	"Performance Show: Week 1"	September 24, 2012	14.11	2.5/7	9.3/14	
2	"Results Show: Week 1"	September 25, 2012	11.79	2.1/6	7.7/12	
3	"Performance Show: Week 2"	October 1, 2012	12.38	2.1/5	9.3/12	
4	"Results Show: Week 2"	October 2, 2012	12.03	2.1/5	7.9/12	
5	"Performance Show: Week 3"	October 8, 2012	13.55	2.2/6	8.9/13	
6	"Results Show: Week 3"	October 9, 2012	13.33	2.2/6	9.0/13	
7	"Performance Show: Week 4"	October 15, 2012	13.64	2.1/5	9.1/13	
8	"Results Show: Week 4"	October 16, 2012	12.92	2.0/6	8.6/13	
9	"Performance Show 1: Week 5"	October 22, 2012	13.27	2.4/6	8.7/13	
10	"Performance Show 2: Week 5"	October 23, 2012	12.90	2.3/7	8.3/13	
11	"Performance Show: Week 6"	October 29, 2012	13.90	2.3/5	9.5/14	
12	"Results Show: Week 6"	October 30, 2012	11.49	1.8/5	7.9/12	
13	"Performance Show: Week 7"	November 5, 2012	13.48	2.1/5	9.0/13	
14	"Performance Show: Week 8"	November 12, 2012	13.79	2.1/5	9.2/14	
15	"Results Show: Week 8"	November 13, 2012	12.11	1.9/5	7.9/12	
16	"Performance Show: Week 9"	November 19, 2012	14.28	2.4/6	9.2/14	
17	"Results Show: Week 9"	November 20, 2012	13.01	2.0/6	8.5/13	
18	"Performance Show: Week 10"	November 26, 2012	16.30	2.7/7	10.4/15	
19	"Season Finale"	November 27, 2012	16.73	3.0/8	10.7/12	
