= Sunmachine =

Sunmachine can refer to:

- Sunmachine (album), a 1998 album by Dario G.
  - "Sunmachine" (song), a 1998 song from that album.
- "The Sun Machine", a 1990 song by E-Zee Possee.
