= Sunmachine (song) =

Single by Dario G

from the album Sunmachine
- Released: 31 August 1998
- Genre: Dance
- Length: 4:19
- Songwriters: Paul Spencer; Scott Rosser; Stephen Spencer; David Bowie
- Producer: Peter Oxendale

Dario G singles chronology
"Carnaval de Paris" (1998)	"Sunmachine" (1998)	"Voices" (2000)

"Sunmachine" is a song by English electronic music trio Dario G. It was released on 31 August 1998 as the third and final single from the album of the same name. It is a reinterpretation of a section from the David Bowie song, "Memory of a Free Festival", from his 1969 album release of Space Oddity.

== Background and writing ==
The idea for "Sunmachine" came about when the trio thought of putting a section of David Bowie's "Memory of a Free Festival" over an ambient version of "Sunchyme", but the band realised they wanted to do more with the track and that idea was scrapped. This early version, however, ended up becoming the album closer, "End of the Beginning".

The final "Sunmachine" track featured new instrumentation over Bowie's vocals. The band ran into problems with the song when they realized the section had too much instrumentation and they could not isolate the vocals. The band explained the idea of the song to Bowie, who fixed the problem by sending them the original master tape of the song, allowing the band to sample Bowie's vocals only.

The track features a flute-accompaniment by Bowie's producer, Tony Visconti.

== Charts ==
Chart (1998)	Peak position
Germany (Media Control Charts)	98
Scotland Singles (OCC)	11
UK Singles (OCC)	17
