= In Full Colour =

Studio album by Dario G
- Released: June 2001
- Length: 69:07
- Label: Mercury
- Producer: Paul Spencer, Scott Rosser

Dario G chronology
Sunmachine (1998)	In Full Colour (2001)	Hola (2020)

In Full Colour is the second studio album by British electronic music act Dario G, released in June 2001 through Mercury Records. Two singles were released from the album, "Dream to Me" and "Say What's on Your Mind". Ingfrid Straumstøyl is the lead vocalist on all but one song, and appears on the album cover alongside Paul Spencer. The lead vocals on "Déjà Vu" are credited to "mikeom". "Never Too Late" was later released as an unofficial single in 2006, under the name Clear-Vu, a supergroup formed by Straumstøyl, hardcore producer Mike "Re-Con" Di Scala of Ultrabeat and CamelPhat, and The Farm guitarist Steve Grimes, who co-wrote the track.

== Release and performance ==
The album was released in June 2001, serving as the follow up to 1998's debut album Sunmachine, which was released following the successful release of debut single "Sunchyme" in 1997. By the time In Full Colour was released, Dario G had become a duo of Paul Spencer and Straumstøyl following the departure of previous band members Scott Rosser and Stephen Spencer had left in order to pursue other projects out-with Dario G. Its release was preceded by the release of its debut single "Dream to Me", a re–worked version of "Dreams" by Irish rock band the Cranberries. It was a commercial success for Dario G, reaching number one in Romania, and reached number four in Scotland, and nine in the United Kingdom and Germany.

Commercially, though, In Full Colour did not perform as strongly as its predecessor, Sunmachine did. It failed to chart in markets where Sunmachine had achieved moderate commercial success, such as the United Kingdom and Scotland, despite the relatively strong performance of "Dream to Me" in the UK and Scottish Singles Charts. It did, however, achieve moderate success on continental European albums charts. In Austria, it peaked at number forty one on the Austrian Albums Charts, where it spent a total of five weeks on the Austrian charts. In Switzerland, it peaked at number sixty-six on the Swiss Albums Charts, spending five weeks on the charts in total, and in Germany, it spent one week on the German Albums Charts following a debut and peak performance of number fifty-eight.

== Track listing ==
In Full Colour track listing
No.	Title	Writer(s)	Length
1.	"Don't You Cry"	Paul Spencer; Scott Rosser; Michael Olton McCollin	5:37
2.	"Dream to Me"	Spencer; Rosser; Dolores O'Riordan; Noel Hogan	3:08
3.	"Eastern Promise"	Spencer; Rosser; McCollin	4:54
4.	"Say What's on Your Mind"	Spencer; Rosser; McCollin	3:22
5.	"Flying (Part I)"	Spencer; Rosser; McCollin	4:33
6.	"Destination Calling"	Spencer; Rosser; McCollin	4:38
7.	"Déjà Vu"	Spencer; Rosser; McCollin	7:07
8.	"Never Too Late (with Clear-Vu)"	Spencer; Rosser; Straumstøyl; Steve Grimes; Mike Di Scala	3:28
9.	"One More Day"	Spencer; Rosser; McCollin	4:52
10.	"Strobe"	Spencer; Rosser; McCollin	5:40

== Charts ==
Chart performance for In Full Colour
Chart (2001)	Peak position
Austrian Albums (Ö3 Austria)	41
German Albums (Offizielle Top 100)	58
Swiss Albums (Schweizer Hitparade)	66

== Personnel ==
The following artists are credited for their work on In Full Colour, as outlined on AllMusic.

- Dario G – Primary Artist
- Dolores O'Riordan – Composer ("Dream to Me" – as features a sample of "Dreams" by The Cranberries)
- Michael Olton McCollin – Composer
- Noel Hogan – Composer ("Dream to Me" – as features a sample of "Dreams" by The Cranberries)
- Paul Spencer – Composer
- Scott Rosser – Composer
