= Albert Reed (model) =

American model (born 1985)

- Born: March 6, 1985 (age 41); South Miami, Florida, U.S.
- Occupations: Model, actor
- Years active: 2004–present
- Modelling information
- Height: 1.88 m (6 ft 2 in)
- Hair colour: Brown
- Eye colour: Blue
- Agency: IMG Models (Worldwide); Premium Models (Paris); Elite Model Management (Milan); Sight Management Studio (Barcelona); Mega Model Agency (Hamburg) MP Stockholm (Stockholm)
- Website: albertreed.net

Albert Reed (born March 6, 1985) is an American model. Raised in the surf culture of Vero Beach, Florida, Reed's modeling career accelerated at the age of 19 after appearing on the cover of Abercrombie & Fitch's 2004 back-to-school catalog. In August 2007, Reed was selected to appear in the fifth season of the U.S. television series Dancing with the Stars.

== Early life ==
Reed was born in South Miami, Florida at the South Miami Hospital to Barbara Foster and John Reed. At the age of thirteen, Reed moved with his family about 150 miles (240 km) north of their middle class Miami neighborhood to Vero Beach, which Reed refers to as "a little surfer town located on the east coast of central Florida." The family's proximity to the beach allowed Reed to surf just about every day. He quickly integrated himself into the local surf culture and adopted a live-to-surf casual lifestyle.

In 2000, Reed began attending Vero Beach High School. While he was in the 10th grade, Reed's parents, who Reed describes as hippies, divorced.

During a trip down to Miami, Reed's modeling potential was discovered accidentally while accompanying a friend to her modeling agency, Karin Models. Although his friend was not signed, Karin Models immediately signed Reed, who then began modeling part-time while he finished high school.

== Career ==
=== Modeling ===
At 18, Reed graduated from high school and moved to Miami to pursue modeling and public relations work in clubs. He received a steady string of modeling jobs, which led to opportunities to model in Greece, Scotland, and then Italy, where Reed lived for about six months. While in Italy, Reed was featured as the sole male model in the Spring/Summer 2004 catalog for Italian sportswear company SLAM Although his European experience was positive, the ongoing Iraq War left Europeans "a bit sour" towards Reed and other Americans working in Europe, and Reed returned to the United States.

A 2004 meeting with photographer Bruce Weber led to Reed's big break, a photo shoot and website video appearance for Abercrombie & Fitch. Reed appeared on a billboard in Times Square with a LIVE TO SURF tattoo and subsequently on the cover of Abercrombie & Fitch's 2004 back-to-school catalog. More than 10 million homes throughout the United States received a copy of that catalog, and that cover subsequently has appeared as an ad in Rolling Stone, GQ, Teen Vogue, and the premiere issue of VITALS. Reed credits the 2004 Abercrombie & Fitch cover for giving him the needed credentials to make it as a professional model.

In September 2004, Reed signed with IMG, a global talent agency and production company in New York City. In December of that same year, Cosmopolitan magazine named Reed as their December 2004 "Cosmo's Guy Without His Shirt".

In January 2005, signed with The John Crosby Management Company, Innovative Artists Talent and Literary Agency in New York, and Bleu Model Management in Los Angeles. In this same month, Ocean Drive magazine highlighted the 19-year-old Reed as "one [of] the 24 freshest faces on the Miami modeling scene," a fact important enough to be featured in Bleu Model Management's listing in Hoover's In-Depth Company Records. He is also with Public Image Worldwide, Elite Model Management in Toronto, and DNA Model Management in New York City.

In March 2005, the Italian sportswear company SLAM announced Reed as cover model for their 2005 Spring/Summer Sportswear Catalog. Reed had previously had appeared as the SLAM 2004 Spring/Summer cover model and the 2004 Fall/Winter cover model.

In April 2005, MostBeautifulMan.com selected Reed as their choice for "April 2005 Most Beautiful Man." Past recipients of Most Beautiful Man selection include Brad Pitt (May 2004) and Ashton Kutcher (Feb. 2004).

In July 2005, former Vice President Al Gore's cable channel, Current TV, filmed Reed during a shooting with celebrity photographer Tony Duran. Current TV additionally interviewed Reed and turned the footage into a segment for their channel. The pod segment was shown on Current TV in early August 2005.

Reed currently is the national face of Van Heusen apparel company.

=== Television ===
On August 29, 2007, ABC television studios announced that Reed would be paired with Anna Trebunskaya (who was gone in two seasons) as a contestant in the fifth season of the television series, Dancing with the Stars beginning on Monday, September 24, 2007 (8:00–9:30 p.m., ET).

What distinguished Reed from the other contestants is that he does not dance. During his interview to be on the show, Reed stated: "I can't. I got rhythm. I'm able to pull out. A few dance moves in a bar or wherever. I'm not unable to dance at all, but I'm definitely not a ballroom dancer by any means." The Chicago Sun-Times listed Reed's odds of winning at 8-1, behind 9-5 odds favorite Scary Spice and three others.

Reed's grandfather, Harry Foster, died in November 2006 and Reed dedicated his Dancing with the Stars performance to him, a former ballroom dancer, and his grandmother. On October 2, Reed was voted off Dancing with the Stars, making him the second celebrity eliminated from the show.

=== Film ===
His first film was the role of Billy in the surfing movie Shelter.

=== Music ===
He has his own band NERD for whom Reed also writes lyrics and songs.

== Personal life ==
Reed owns a mountain hideaway in Colorado, but makes his home in Southern California, where he tries getting a week of surfing in every month to keep balanced.

Reed is also a celebrity spokesman for America's Second Harvest - The Nation's Food Bank Network, the largest domestic hunger-relief charity in the United States.

== Filmography ==
- 2007: Shelter as Billy
- 2009: Double Fault as Lucas Montgomery (short)
