= Jonathan Roberts (dancer) =

American professional ballroom dancer (born 1974)

- Born: April 20, 1974 (age 52); United States
- Occupation: Ballroom dancer
- Spouse: Anna Trebunskaya (m. 2003; sep. 2012)

Jonathan Roberts (born April 20, 1974) is an American professional ballroom dancer. He decided to take up dancing after he received a free trial at a local dance studio and enjoyed it. He currently resides in California.

== Achievements ==
Jonathan Roberts is most well known for dancing on the United States version of Dancing with the Stars and choreographing routines on So You Think You Can Dance. In the past Roberts has competed and won the following awards.

- 2008 World Professional Smooth Champion, with Valentina Kostenko
- 2008 US National Professional Smooth Champion, with Valentina Kostenko
- 2004 US National Professional Rising Star Latin Champion, with Anna Trebunskaya
- 2003 Blackpool Professional Rising Star Latin Vice Champion, with Anna Trebunskaya
- 1997 US National Professional Rising Star Ballroom Champion, with Roberta Sun
- USA pro-am 10 dance champion
- USA pro-am Latin champion
- USA pro-am American Ballroom champion

== Dancing with the Stars ==
He competed in seasons 1, 2, 4, 5, 6, 8 and 9 of the U.S. version of Dancing with the Stars. In Season 1, he danced with celebrity Rachel Hunter. They were the third couple to be eliminated coming in 4th place. In Season 2, he danced with celebrity Giselle Fernández. They were also eliminated in the third week and came in 8th place. In Season 4, he danced with Heather Mills. They were voted off in the sixth week of the competition and came in 7th place. Roberts returned for the fifth season and was partnered with entertainer Marie Osmond. They achieved 3rd place, being eliminated during the final show of the season. Season five was Roberts' most successful season so far.

His partner for Season 6 was Monica Seles. They scored 15 for the Foxtrot and 15 for the Mambo. This is the lowest judge's score of the season as of March 25, 2008. Roberts and Seles were one of the first two couples eliminated from the competition. His then-wife Anna Trebunskaya was sick during her week 3 practice, and a video of Jonathan dancing and teaching her partner, Steve Guttenberg was shown. After this, for the encore performance, he and Guttenberg were asked to do the entire routine.

Jonathan returned for Season 8, and was partnered with pop singer Belinda Carlisle but they became the first couple eliminated, making this the second time that he was eliminated in the first Results Show. Despite being eliminated first, he & Belinda held a higher average than a few celebrities who lasted longer than them.

Jonathan also returned for Season 9 of Dancing with the Stars and was paired with Grammy Award winning artist Macy Gray. The couple were the second pair to be voted off in the season's first results show, making this the third time in a row Roberts was voted off after the first week, and making Jonathan the professional dancer on the show tied voted off first the most times (three times) with Edyta Sliwinska and Keo Motsepe.

Season	Partner	Place	Average Score
1	Rachel Hunter	4th	23.75
2	Giselle Fernández	8th	23.00
4	Heather Mills	7th	22.17
5	Marie Osmond	3rd	24.57
6	Monica Seles	11th	15.00
8	Belinda Carlisle	13th	17.50
9	Macy Gray	15th	15.00

=== Season 1 ===
With Rachel Hunter

Week #	Dance/Song	Judges' score			Total	Result
Week #	Dance/Song	Inaba	Goodman	Tonioli	Total	Result
1	Waltz/ "Three Times a Lady"	7	6	7	20	No elimination
2	Rumba/ "I Don't Want to Miss a Thing"	8	8	8	24	Bottom 2
3	Tango/ "Toxic"	8	9	9	26	Safe
4	Samba/ "Soul Bossa Nova"	7	9	9	25	Eliminated

=== Season 2 ===
With Giselle Fernandez

Week #	Dance/Song	Judges' score			Total	Result
Week #	Dance/Song	Inaba	Goodman	Tonioli	Total	Result
1	Waltz/ "I Never Loved a Man (The Way I Loved You)"	7	8	8	23	Safe
2	Rumba/ "Take My Breath Away"	8	8	8	24	Safe
3	Tango/ "Hernando's Hideaway"	7	8	7	22	Eliminated

=== Season 4 ===
With Heather Mills

Week #	Dance/Song	Judges' score			Total	Result
Week #	Dance/Song	Inaba	Goodman	Tonioli	Total	Result
1	Foxtrot/ "Cheek to Cheek"	6	6	6	18	No elimination
2	Mambo/ "Mambo Italiano"	8	8	8	24	Safe
3	Jive/ "Can I Get a Witness"	8	8	8	24	Safe
4	Waltz/ "Sandy's Song"	7	8	8	23	Safe
5	Samba/ "Heaven Must Be Missing an Angel"	7	7	7	21	Bottom 2
6	Paso Doble/ "Don't Cry For Me Argentina"	7	8	8	23	Eliminated

=== Season 5 ===
With Marie Osmond

Week #	Dance/Song	Judges' score			Total	Result
Week #	Dance/Song	Inaba	Goodman	Tonioli	Total	Result
1	Foxtrot/ "I Hear a Symphony"	7	7	7	21	Safe
2	Mambo/ "Mambo"	8	8	8	24	Safe
3	Tango/ "Please Mister Brown"	9	8	9	26	Safe
4	Viennese Waltz/ "Can't Help Falling in Love"	9	9	8	26	Safe
5	Samba/ "Crickets Sing for Anamaria"	7	7	7	21	Safe
6	Paso Doble/ "Erythrina Fusca"	8	8	7	23	Safe
7	Quickstep/ "Boogie Woogie Bugle Boy"; Cha cha cha/ "Venus"	10; 8	9; 8	9; 8	52 (28 + 24)	Safe
8	Rumba/ "My Cherie Amour"; Jive/ "Whose Bed Have Your Boots Been Under"	8; 8	8; 9	8; 8	49 (24 + 25)	Safe
9 Semi-finals	Quickstep/ "Good Morning"; Mambo/ "Guaglione"	10; 9	10; 9	9; 9	56 (29 + 27)	Safe
10; Finals	Samba "Chica Chica Boom Chic"; Freestyle/ "Start Me Up"	8; 8	8; 7	8; 7	46 (24 + 22)	Third Place

=== Season 6 ===
With Monica Seles

Week #	Dance/Song	Judges' score			Total	Result
Week #	Dance/Song	Inaba	Goodman	Tonioli	Total	Result
1	Foxtrot/ "Bubbly"	5	5	5	15	No Eliminations
2	Mambo/ "My Lovin' (You're Never Gonna Get It)"	5	5	5	15	Eliminated

=== Season 8 ===
With Belinda Carlisle

Week #	Dance/Song	Judges' score			Total	Result
Week #	Dance/Song	Inaba	Goodman	Tonioli	Total	Result
1	Waltz/ "What the World Needs Now is Love"	6	6	5	17	No Eliminations
2	Salsa/ "Higher"	6	6	6	18	Eliminated
2	Salsa/ "Higher"	5	6	6	17	Eliminated

=== Season 9 ===
With Macy Gray

Week #	Dance/Song	Judges' score			Total	Result
Week #	Dance/Song	Inaba	Goodman	Tonioli	Total	Result
1	Viennese Waltz/ "(You Make Me Feel Like) A Natural Woman"; Cha-Cha-Cha relay/ "Centerfold"	6 Awarded	4; 4	5 Points	19 (15 + 4)	Eliminated
