= Dancing with the Stars (American TV series) season 5 =

Dancing with the Stars
- Season 5
- Promotional poster, featuring former pro dancers Edyta Śliwińska and Alec Mazo
- Hosted by: Tom Bergeron; Samantha Harris
- Judges: Carrie Ann Inaba; Len Goodman; Bruno Tonioli
- Celebrity winner: Hélio Castroneves
- Professional winner: Julianne Hough
- No. of episodes: 21

Release
- Original network: ABC
- Original release: September 24 – November 27, 2007

Season chronology
- ← Previous; Season 4 Next → Season 6

Season five of Dancing with the Stars premiered on September 24, 2007, with a special three-night premiere week, on the ABC network. As with previous seasons, CTV Television Network aired the series in Canada.

On November 27, 2007, IndyCar driver Hélio Castroneves and Julianne Hough were crowned the champions, while Spice Girls singer Mel B and Maksim Chmerkovskiy finished in second place, and entertainer Marie Osmond and Jonathan Roberts finished third.

== Cast ==
=== Couples ===
This season featured twelve celebrity contestants. On August 29, 2007, the cast was announced on Good Morning America by Tom Bergeron, Carrie Ann Inaba, and reigning celebrity champion Apolo Anton Ohno.

Celebrity	Notability	Professional partner	Status
Josie Maran	Model & actress	Alec Mazo	Eliminated 1st on September 25, 2007
Albert Reed	Supermodel	Anna Trebunskaya	Eliminated 2nd on October 2, 2007
Wayne Newton	Las Vegas entertainer	Cheryl Burke	Eliminated 3rd on October 9, 2007
Floyd Mayweather Jr.	Professional boxer	Karina Smirnoff	Eliminated 4th on October 16, 2007
Mark Cuban	Dallas Mavericks owner & entrepreneur	Kym Johnson	Eliminated 5th on October 23, 2007
Sabrina Bryan	The Cheetah Girls singer & actress	Mark Ballas	Eliminated 6th on October 30, 2007
Jane Seymour	Film & television actress	Tony Dovolani	Eliminated 7th on November 6, 2007
Cameron Mathison	All My Children actor & TV host	Edyta Śliwińska	Eliminated 8th on November 13, 2007
Jennie Garth	Television actress	Derek Hough	Eliminated 9th on November 20, 2007
Marie Osmond	Entertainer	Jonathan Roberts	Third place on November 27, 2007
Mel B	Spice Girls singer	Maksim Chmerkovskiy	Runners-up on November 27, 2007
Hélio Castroneves	Indy 500 champion	Julianne Hough	Winners on November 27, 2007

Future appearances

Hélio Castroneves and Sabrina Bryan returned for the All-Stars season, where Castroneves was paired with Chelsie Hightower and Bryan was paired with Louis van Amstel.

=== Hosts and judges ===
The show was co-hosted by Tom Bergeron and Samantha Harris, with Len Goodman, Bruno Tonioli, and Carrie Ann Inaba returning as judges. Samantha Harris gave birth on September 23, 2007. During her leave of absence, season two champion Drew Lachey filled in as co-host. Harris returned to the show on October 15.

== Episodes ==
No. overall	No. in season	Title	Original release date	U.S. viewers (millions)
64	1	"Round 1: Part 1"	September 24, 2007	21.25
65	2	"Round 1: Part 2"	September 25, 2007	18.50
66	3	"Round Results"	September 26, 2007	16.81
67	4	"Round 2"	October 1, 2007	20.21
68	5	"Round 2 Results"	October 2, 2007	18.50
69	6	"Round 3"	October 8, 2007	19.62
70	7	"Round 3 Results"	October 9, 2007	16.36
71	8	"Round 4"	October 15, 2007	19.40
72	9	"Round 4 Results"	October 16, 2007	17.30
73	10	"Round 5"	October 22, 2007	21.37
74	11	"Round 5 Results"	October 23, 2007	18.06
75	12	"Round 6"	October 29, 2007	21.43
76	13	"Round 6 Results"	October 30, 2007	18.86
77	14	"Round 7"	November 5, 2007	20.47
78	15	"Round 7 Results"	November 6, 2007	17.06
79	16	"Round 8"	November 12, 2007	21.81
80	17	"Round 8 Results"	November 13, 2007	17.59
81	18	"Round 9"	November 19, 2007	22.85
82	19	"Round 9 Results"	November 20, 2007	20.95
83	20	"Finale"	November 26, 2007	24.23
84	21	"Finale Results"	November 27, 2007	24.87

== Scoring chart ==
The highest score each week is indicated in bold green with a dagger (†), while the lowest score each week is indicated in italicized red with a double-dagger (‡).

Color key:

Winners
Runners-up
Third place
Bottom two
Eliminated

Dancing with the Stars (season 5) - Weekly scores
Couple	Pl.	Week										
Couple	Pl.	1	2	3	4	5	6	7	8	9	10	
Couple	Pl.	1	2	3	4	5	6	7	8	9	Night 1	Night 2
Hélio & Julianne	1st	25	**27**†	24	27	23	28	25+27=52	27+30=**57**†	30+30=**60**†	25+29=54	+30=84‡ (Note: This couple finished in first place.)
Mel & Maks	2nd	24	23	**27**†	26 (Note: This couple was in the bottom two, but was not eliminated.)	**29**†	**30**†	24+30=**54**†	27+29=56	30+30=**60**†	28+27=**55**†	+30=**85**† (Note: This couple finished in second place.)
Marie & Jonathan	3rd	21	24	26	26	21‡	23	28+24=52	24+25=49‡	29+27=56‡	24+22=46‡ (Note: This couple finished in third place.)	
Jennie & Derek	4th	21	21	26	27	25	27	25+28=53	24+26=50	28+30=58 (Note: This couple was eliminated.)		
Cameron & Edyta	5th	21	21	23	27	26	25	24+27=51	27+24=51			
Jane & Tony	6th	24	21	**27**†	26	26	22‡	24+26=50‡				
Sabrina & Mark	7th	**26**†	26	**27**†	**30**†	28	25					
Mark & Kym	8th	21	18	20	22‡	21‡						
Floyd & Karina	9th	18	21	21	23							
Wayne & Cheryl	10th	19	15‡	18‡								
Albert & Anna	11th	21	21									
Josie & Alec	12th	16‡										

== Weekly scores ==
Individual judges' scores in the charts below (given in parentheses) are listed in this order from left to right: Carrie Ann Inaba, Len Goodman, Bruno Tonioli.

=== Week 1 ===
Each couple performed either the cha-cha-cha or the foxtrot. The women performed on the first night and the men on the second. Couples are listed in the order they performed.

Night 1 (Women)

Couple	Scores	Dance	Music	Result
Jennie & Derek	21 (7, 7, 7)	Cha-cha-cha	"Uptown Girl" — Billy Joel	Safe
Josie & Alec	16 (6, 5, 5)	Foxtrot	"Walkin' My Baby Back Home" — Nat King Cole	Eliminated
Sabrina & Mark	26 (9, 8, 9)	Cha-cha-cha	"Don't Cha" — Pussycat Dolls	Safe
Marie & Jonathan	21 (7, 7, 7)	Foxtrot	"I Hear a Symphony" — The Supremes	Safe
Mel & Maks	24 (8, 8, 8)	Cha-cha-cha	"A Deeper Love" — Aretha Franklin	Safe
Jane & Tony	24 (8, 8, 8)	Foxtrot	"Let's Do It, Let's Fall in Love" — Eartha Kitt	Safe

Night 2 (Men)

Couple	Scores	Dance	Music	Result
Cameron & Edyta	21 (7, 7, 7)	Foxtrot	"Moondance" — Van Morrison	Safe
Floyd & Karina	18 (6, 6, 6)	Cha-cha-cha	"The Way You Move" — OutKast	Safe
Hélio & Julianne	25 (8, 9, 8)	Foxtrot	"Bewitched" — Steve Lawrence	Safe
Albert & Anna	21 (7, 7, 7)	Cha-cha-cha	"A Little Less Conversation" — Elvis Presley	Safe
Mark & Kym	21 (7, 7, 7)	Foxtrot	"King of the Road" — Roger Miller	Bottom two
Wayne & Cheryl	19 (6, 7, 6)	Cha-cha-cha	"You're the First, the Last, My Everything" — Barry White	Safe

=== Week 2 ===
Each couple performed either the mambo or the quickstep. Couples are listed in the order they performed.

Couple	Scores	Dance	Music	Result
Mel & Maks	23 (7, 8, 8)	Quickstep	"Take On Me" — A-ha	Safe
Mark & Kym	18 (6, 6, 6)	Mambo	"Ride wit Me" — Nelly, feat. City Spud	Safe
Wayne & Cheryl	15 (5, 5, 5)	Quickstep	"Viva Las Vegas" — Elvis Presley	Bottom two
Marie & Jonathan	24 (8, 8, 8)	Mambo	"Mambo (Uno, Dos, Tres)" — Perez Prado	Safe
Albert & Anna	21 (7, 7, 7)	Quickstep	"99 Red Balloons" — Nena	Eliminated
Hélio & Julianne	27 (9, 9, 9)	Mambo	"Para los Rumberos" — Santana	Safe
Jennie & Derek	21 (7, 7, 7)	Quickstep	"Suddenly I See" — KT Tunstall	Safe
Cameron & Edyta	21 (7, 7, 7)	Mambo	"Mas Que Nada" — Sérgio Mendes & The Black Eyed Peas	Safe
Floyd & Karina	21 (7, 7, 7)	Quickstep	"Signed, Sealed, Delivered I'm Yours" — Stevie Wonder	Safe
Jane & Tony	21 (7, 7, 7)	Mambo	"Cuban Pete" — Desi Arnaz	Safe
Sabrina & Mark	26 (9, 8, 9)	Quickstep	"They're Red Hot" — Robert Johnson	Safe

=== Week 3 ===
Each couple performed either the jive or the tango. Couples are listed in the order they performed.

Couple	Scores	Dance	Music	Result
Sabrina & Mark	27 (9, 9, 9)	Jive	"Shake, Rattle, and Roll" — Huey Lewis and the News	Safe
Cameron & Edyta	23 (8, 7, 8)	Tango	"The Beat Goes On" — Sonny & Cher	Safe
Mark & Kym	20 (6, 7, 7)	Jive	"New Shoes" — Paolo Nutini	Safe
Jennie & Derek	26 (9, 8, 9)	Tango	"Cité Tango" — Astor Piazolla	Safe
Mel & Maks	27 (9, 9, 9)	Jive	"Sweet Soul Music" — Sam & Dave	Safe
Wayne & Cheryl	18 (6, 6, 6)	Tango	"La Cumparsita" — Danny Malando	Eliminated
Floyd & Karina	21 (7, 7, 7)	Jive	"Mess Around" — Ray Charles	Bottom two
Jane & Tony	27 (9, 9, 9)	Tango	"Perfidia" — John Altman	Safe
Hélio & Julianne	24 (8, 8, 8)	Jive	"Kids in America" — Kim Wilde	Safe
Marie & Jonathan	26 (9, 8, 9)	Tango	"Please Mr. Brown" — Alma Cogan	Safe

=== Week 4 ===
Each couple performed either the paso doble or the Viennese waltz. Couples are listed in the order they performed.

Couple	Scores	Dance	Music	Result
Mark & Kym	22 (7, 8, 7)	Viennese waltz	"Mr. Bojangles" — Robbie Williams	Safe
Sabrina & Mark	30 (10, 10, 10)	Paso doble	"You Spin Me Round (Like a Record)" — Dead or Alive	Safe
Jane & Tony	26 (8, 9, 9)	Viennese waltz	"Piano Man" — Billy Joel	Safe
Floyd & Karina	23 (7, 8, 8)	Paso doble	"Captain from Castile" — United States Air Force Band	Eliminated
Mel & Maks	26 (8, 9, 9)	Viennese waltz	"Breakaway" — Kelly Clarkson	Bottom two
Cameron & Edyta	27 (9, 9, 9)	Paso doble	"Theme from Superman" — John Williams	Safe
Marie & Jonathan	26 (9, 9, 8)	Viennese waltz	"Can't Help Falling in Love" — Elvis Presley	Safe
Jennie & Derek	27 (8, 10, 9)	Paso doble	"Because We Can" — Fatboy Slim	Safe
Hélio & Julianne	27 (9, 9, 9)	Viennese waltz	"Iris" — Goo Goo Dolls	Safe

=== Week 5 ===
Each couple performed either the rumba or the samba. Couples are listed in the order they performed.

Week 5 was marred because Marie Osmond fainted live on-air while she was receiving her samba critique from the judges.

Couple	Scores	Dance	Music	Result
Marie & Jonathan	21 (7, 7, 7)	Samba	"Crickets Sing for Anamaria" — Astrud Gilberto	Safe
Jane & Tony	26 (8, 9, 9)	Rumba	"Breathe Again" — Toni Braxton	Bottom two
Mark & Kym	21 (7, 7, 7)	Samba	"I Dream of Jeannie" — The Hit Crew	Eliminated
Sabrina & Mark	28 (9, 9, 10)	Rumba	"Me & Mrs. Jones" — Billy Paul	Safe
Jennie & Derek	25 (8, 9, 8)	Samba	"Cosmic Girl" — Jamiroquai	Safe
Hélio & Julianne	23 (8, 7, 8)	Rumba	"Apologize" — Timbaland, feat. OneRepublic	Safe
Mel & Maks	29 (10, 9, 10)	Samba	"Spice Up Your Life" — Spice Girls	Safe
Cameron & Edyta	26 (8, 9, 9)	Rumba	"I've Got to See You Again" — Norah Jones	Safe

=== Week 6 ===
Each couple performed one unlearned dance, and a group Rock and Roll dance. Couples are listed in the order they performed.

Couple	Scores	Dance	Music	Result
Sabrina & Mark	25 (9, 8, 8)	Foxtrot	"I'm a Woman" — Peggy Lee	Eliminated
Jennie & Derek	27 (9, 9, 9)	Mambo	"Mambo Baby" — Ruth Brown	Safe
Jane & Tony	22 (8, 7, 7)	Jive	"Modern Love" — David Bowie	Safe
Cameron & Edyta	25 (9, 8, 8)	Samba	"Magalenha" — Sérgio Mendes	Bottom two
Mel & Maks	30 (10, 10, 10)	Rumba	"A Woman's Worth" — Alicia Keys	Safe
Marie & Jonathan	23 (8, 8, 7)	Paso doble	"Erythrina Fusca" — Unidad musical de la Guardia Real España	Safe
Hélio & Julianne	28 (9, 10, 9)	Cha-cha-cha	"Get Up Offa That Thing" — James Brown	Safe
Cameron & Edyta Helio & Julianne Jane & Tony Jennie & Derek Marie & Jonathan Mel & Maks Sabrina & Mark	No scores received	Group; Rock and Roll	"Rockin' Robin" — Bobby Day	

=== Week 7 ===
Each couple performed two unlearned dances. Couples are listed in the order they performed.

Couple	Scores	Dance	Music	Result
Hélio & Julianne	25 (9, 8, 8)	Tango	"The Jean Genie" — David Bowie	Safe
Hélio & Julianne	27 (9, 9, 9)	Samba	"Candela" — Buena Vista Social Club	Safe
Marie & Jonathan	28 (10, 9, 9)	Quickstep	"Boogie Woogie Bugle Boy" — The Andrews Sisters	Safe
Marie & Jonathan	24 (8, 8, 8)	Cha-cha-cha	"Venus" — Bananarama	Safe
Mel & Maks	24 (8, 8, 8)	Foxtrot	"Jimmy Mack" — Martha and the Vandellas	Safe
Mel & Maks	30 (10, 10, 10)	Paso doble	"Free Your Mind" — En Vogue	Safe
Jane & Tony	24 (8, 8, 8)	Quickstep	"I Walk the Line" — Johnny Cash	Eliminated
Jane & Tony	26 (8, 9, 9)	Cha-cha-cha	"The Shoop Shoop Song (It's in His Kiss)" — Betty Everett	Eliminated
Jennie & Derek	25 (8, 8, 9)	Viennese waltz	"Runaway" — The Corrs	Safe
Jennie & Derek	28 (9, 9, 10)	Rumba	"Fallen" — Lauren Wood	Safe
Cameron & Edyta	24 (8, 8, 8)	Quickstep	"Why Can't I Be You?" — The Cure	Safe
Cameron & Edyta	27 (9, 9, 9)	Jive	"Boy from New York City" — The Manhattan Transfer	Safe

=== Week 8 ===
Each couple performed two unlearned dances. Couples are listed in the order they performed.

Couple	Scores	Dance	Music	Result
Jennie & Derek	24 (8, 8, 8)	Jive	"It Takes Two" — Marvin Gaye & Kim Weston	Safe
Jennie & Derek	26 (9, 9, 8)	Foxtrot	"I've Got You Under My Skin" — Michael Bublé	Safe
Cameron & Edyta	27 (9, 9, 9)	Viennese waltz	"Hedwig's Theme" — John Williams	Eliminated
Cameron & Edyta	24 (8, 8, 8)	Cha-cha-cha	"Brown Sugar" — Rolling Stones	Eliminated
Marie & Jonathan	24 (8, 8, 8)	Rumba	"My Cherie Amour" — Stevie Wonder	Safe
Marie & Jonathan	25 (8, 9, 8)	Jive	"Whose Bed Have Your Boots Been Under?" — Shania Twain	Safe
Hélio & Julianne	27 (9, 9, 9)	Paso doble	"Amparito Roca" — Unidad musical de la Guardia Real España	Safe
Hélio & Julianne	30 (10, 10, 10)	Quickstep	"Hey! Pachuco!" — Royal Crown Revue	Safe
Mel & Maks	27 (9, 9, 9)	Tango	"Personal Jesus" — Depeche Mode	Safe
Mel & Maks	29 (9, 10, 10)	Mambo	"Mambo Jambo" — Perez Prado	Safe

=== Week 9 ===
Each couple performed two dance styles already performed earlier in the season. Couples are listed in the order they performed.

Couple	Scores	Dance	Music	Result
Marie & Jonathan	29 (10, 10, 9)	Quickstep	"Good Morning" — from Singin' in the Rain	Safe
Marie & Jonathan	27 (9, 9, 9)	Mambo	"Guaglione" — Perez Prado	Safe
Mel & Maks	30 (10, 10, 10)	Viennese waltz	"Somebody to Love" — Queen	Safe
Mel & Maks	30 (10, 10, 10)	Paso doble	"(I Can't Get No) Satisfaction" — The Rolling Stones	Safe
Jennie & Derek	28 (9, 10, 9)	Tango	"The Take Over, the Breaks Over" — Fall Out Boy	Eliminated
Jennie & Derek	30 (10, 10, 10)	Cha-cha-cha	"Mustang Sally" — Wilson Pickett	Eliminated
Hélio & Julianne	30 (10, 10, 10)	Foxtrot	"Ain't That a Kick in the Head?" — Dean Martin	Safe
Hélio & Julianne	30 (10, 10, 10)	Cha-cha-cha	"Love Rollercoaster" — Red Hot Chili Peppers	Safe

=== Week 10 ===
On the first night, each couple performed a dance style already performed earlier in the season and a freestyle. On the second night, the two remaining couples performed their favorite dance of the season.

Night 1

Couple	Scores	Dance	Music	Result
Mel & Maks	28 (9, 9, 10)	Cha-cha-cha	"Car Wash" — Rose Royce	Safe
Mel & Maks	27 (9, 9, 9)	Freestyle	"The Way I Are" — Timbaland, feat. Keri Hilson	Safe
Marie & Jonathan	24 (8, 8, 8)	Samba	"Chica Chica Boom Chic" — Carmen Miranda	Eliminated (Third place)
Marie & Jonathan	22 (8, 7, 7)	Freestyle	"Start Me Up" — The Rolling Stones	Eliminated (Third place)
Hélio & Julianne	25 (8, 8, 9)	Jive	"Let's Twist Again" — Chubby Checker	Safe
Hélio & Julianne	29 (9, 10, 10)	Freestyle	"Land of 1000 Dances" — Wilson Pickett	Safe

Night 2

Couple	Scores	Dance	Music	Result
Mel & Maks	30 (10, 10, 10)	Mambo	"Mambo Jambo" — Perez Prado	Runners-up
Hélio & Julianne	30 (10, 10, 10)	Quickstep	"Hey! Pachuco!" — Royal Crown Revue	Winners

== Dance chart ==
The couples performed the following each week:

- Week 1: One unlearned dance (cha-cha-cha or foxtrot)
- Week 2: One unlearned dance (mambo or quickstep)
- Week 3: One unlearned dance (jive or tango)
- Week 4: One unlearned dance (paso doble or Viennese waltz)
- Week 5: One unlearned dance (rumba or samba)
- Week 6: One unlearned dance & Rock and Roll group dance
- Week 7: Two unlearned dances
- Week 8: Two unlearned dances
- Week 9: Two unlearned dances
- Week 10 (Night 1): Redemption dance & freestyle
- Week 10 (Night 2): Favorite dance of the season

Color key:

No scores received

Dancing with the Stars (season 5) - Dance chart
Couple	Week															
Couple	1	2	3	4	5	6		7		8		9		10		
Couple	1	2	3	4	5	6		7		8		9		Night 1		Night 2
Hélio & Julianne	Foxtrot	Mambo	Jive	Viennese waltz	Rumba	Cha-cha-cha	Group; Rock and Roll (Note: No scores were received for this dance.)	Tango	Samba	Paso doble	Quickstep	Foxtrot	Cha-cha-cha	Jive	Freestyle	Quickstep
Mel & Maks	Cha-cha-cha	Quickstep	Jive	Viennese waltz	Samba	Rumba	Group; Rock and Roll	Foxtrot	Paso doble	Tango	Mambo	Viennese waltz	Paso doble	Cha-cha-cha	Freestyle	Mambo
Marie & Jonathan	Foxtrot	Mambo	Tango	Viennese waltz	Samba	Paso doble	Group; Rock and Roll	Quickstep	Cha-cha-cha	Rumba	Jive	Quickstep	Mambo	Samba	Freestyle	
Jennie & Derek	Cha-cha-cha	Quickstep	Tango	Paso doble	Samba	Mambo	Group; Rock and Roll	Viennese waltz	Rumba	Jive	Foxtrot	Tango	Cha-cha-cha			
Cameron & Edyta	Foxtrot	Mambo	Tango	Paso doble	Rumba	Samba	Group; Rock and Roll	Quickstep	Jive	Viennese waltz	Cha-cha-cha					
Jane & Tony	Foxtrot	Mambo	Tango	Viennese waltz	Rumba	Jive	Group; Rock and Roll	Quickstep	Cha-cha-cha							
Sabrina & Mark	Cha-cha-cha	Quickstep	Jive	Paso doble	Rumba	Foxtrot	Group; Rock and Roll									
Mark & Kym	Foxtrot	Mambo	Jive	Viennese waltz	Samba											
Floyd & Karina	Cha-cha-cha	Quickstep	Jive	Paso doble												
Wayne & Cheryl	Cha-cha-cha	Quickstep	Tango													
Albert & Anna	Cha-cha-cha	Quickstep														
Josie & Alec	Foxtrot															
