= Sunmachine (album) =

Studio album by Dario G
- Released: 8 June 1998
- Studio: Lansdowne Studios (London) "Rented studio in Crewe"
- Genre: Dance
- Length: 69:07
- Label: Warner
- Producer: Peter Oxendale; Dario G

Dario G chronology
Sunmachine (1998)	In Full Colour (2001)

Sunmachine is the debut album by British electronic music trio Dario G, released on 8 June 1998 through the Warner label. According to the notes on Dario G's single "Sunchyme", the album was originally set to be titled Super Dario Land.

== Background and recording ==
After signing with Warner Bros. Records, the trio were under pressure from the record label in order to record and release a debut album. Initially, the working title for their debut album was Super Dario Land. Band member Scott Rosser said that "they got together a plan for one, to be called Super Dario Land, and for three or four weeks, we thought we'd go for it as well – we actually started work on it on the day after the commercial release of 'Sunchyme' went into the charts, in mid‑September." The trio were keen to record an album which was different from "Sunchyme". Their record label at that time, Warner Bros., were said to have also expected their debut album to be based around the sound which lead to their breakthrough with the single. However, Paul Spencer recalled that "record companies like to cash in on a big hit. They think 'OK, these guys can probably get another sample together quickly and churn out another record that sounds like the first one'". He also recalled that "Warners did that with us too, at first, but we didn't want to do lots of little soundalike follow‑ups, we have got more depth than that".

Up until the beginning of the recording sessions for the album, band members Scott and Paul had only really had experience as MIDI programmers and samplists. They claimed to have had "little experience of commercial studio environments, multitrack recording, and hard disk recording systems". After unsuccessful recording sessions at Lansdowne Studios in London, the trio decided to record the album in a rented studio in Crewe, and unlike other conventional recording studios, they were "free to come and go as they pleased" during the recording sessions. Scott explained that "it's funny because you spend years thinking you'll be really motoring when you get in a real studio, and it didn't live up to our expectations, really". He further commented "everything seemed totally new to us. For example, when we got there, the engineer started laying the tracks we'd completed on to multitrack tape. We were just sitting around not doing anything while he did that and it all seemed very strange". Paul claimed that "the studio and London accommodation was costing us a total of £4500 a week" when asked about the decision to stop recording at Lansdowne Studios, further adding "we didn't feel in control, really. We were getting tired, our ears were tired, and we were getting quite stressed out. The really scary thing is, we could have carried on — I mean a lot of bands just keep going, and they actually write in places like Lansdowne".

Following the release of Sunmachine, Scott Rosser and Stephen Spencer left in order to pursue other projects, leaving Paul Spencer to continue as a solo artist under the Dario G name.

== Release and promotion ==
Sunmachine was released on 8 June 1998 internationally, distributed via Warner Bros. Records following the completion of its recording at Lansdowne Studios in London. The album was intended to be completed and released by October 1997, featuring seven tracks and being one hour long in length. The trio claimed that the success of "Sunchyme" lead to them taking more time and consideration to the recording and release of the album. By November 1997, Dario G learned that the single had sold more than 1.3 million copies internationally, and claimed that the success of the song meant they needed a "good quality album" in order for it to be considered for release in the American and Japanese markets.

Four singles were ultimately released from the album. "Sunchyme" reached number two in the UK Singles Chart in 1997. This was followed in 1998 by "Carnaval de Paris", which reached number five shortly before the release of the album. The third single, "Sunmachine", reached number 17 in the same year, while the fourth single, "Voices", was released in 2000 and reached number 37 in the UK.

== Critical reception ==
Professional ratings
Review scores
Source	Rating
AllMusic	2.5/5 stars
Muzik	3/5 stars
Richmond Times-Dispatch	3/4 stars

Upon release of Sunmachine, Michael Gallucci of AllMusic said that "it's quite appropriate that English dance trio Dario G should name its debut Sunmachine; bright beats and shining grooves grace the album like rays of light breaking a long darkness". He further added that "heavy on samples and even heavier on peace-and-love idealism, Sunmachine is electronic dance music swathed in a neon pop-colored smiley face. But it's all about studio tricks with Dario G; after an hour of this thematic journey (all the songs are tied together, and the climatic, ten-minute album closer wraps it all up in a winding, spinning kaleidoscope)". He concluded that after a period of listening to the album, it "all begins to sound the same...and quite pointless".

== Commercial performance ==
Commercially, Sunmachine was a moderate success; however, arguably it failed to live up to the success of the singles "Sunchyme" and "Carnival de Paris". In the United Kingdom, it debuted at number ninety-three in June 1998, spending only one week on the UK Albums Chart before falling out of the chart entirely. It re–entered the UK Albums Chart in July, following the success of its second single release, "Carnival de Paris", at number twenty-seven, before reaching a peak of number twenty-six the following week. In total, it spent six weeks on the UK Albums Chart. In Scotland, it peaked at number twenty-five on the Scottish Albums Chart, and went on to spend a total of six weeks on that chart.

In Germany, it debuted at number ninety-nine on the official German Albums Chart. In its second week of release, it fell to number one hundred before starting to steadily climb in subsequent weeks until it reached its peak of number fifty-nine. It spent a total of seven weeks on the German Albums Chart. Its only other appearance on an international albums charts was in Switzerland, where it debuted and peaked at number forty-three. It spent five weeks on the Swiss Albums Chart, before reaching number fifty in its fifth and final week, before falling out of the chart entirely.

== Track listing ==
All tracks written by Paul Spencer, Scott Rosser and Stephen Spencer (Dario G), except where noted.

No.	Title	Writer(s)	Length
1.	"Sunchyme"	P. Spencer; Rosser; S. Spencer; Nick Laird-Clowes; Gilbert Gabriel	6:19
2.	"Carnaval de Paris"		5:09
3.	"Sunmachine"	P. Spencer; Rosser; S. Spencer; David Bowie	7:19
4.	"Voices" (featuring Espiritu)		5:20
5.	"Be My Friend" (featuring Deepika)	P. Spencer; Rosser; S. Spencer; Steve Coe	8:08
6.	"Peaches"		6:17
7.	"Malaway"	P. Spencer; Rosser; S. Spencer; David Hudson	7:18
8.	"Revolution"		9:16
9.	"Voices" (acoustic version; featuring Espiritu)		3:27
10.	"End of the Beginning"	P. Spencer; Rosser; S. Spencer; Laird-Clowes; Gabriel; Bowie	10:30

Notes

- "Sunchyme" contains a sample from "Life in a Northern Town" by The Dream Academy.
- "Sunmachine" contains a sample from "Memory of a Free Festival" by David Bowie.
- "Voices" contains samples from the Steve Levine sample collection.
- "Malaway" contains samples from "Proud to be Aborigine" by Tjapukai Dance Theatre, and "Orgasmico" by Ramirez.
- "End of the Beginning" contains samples from "Life in a Northern Town" by The Dream Academy and "Memory of a Free Festival" by David Bowie.

== Personnel ==
Adapted from the album's liner notes.

Musicians

- Dario G – primary artist
- Belleville Primary School Choir – choir (track 4)
- Stuart Brooks – trumpet (track 2)
- Victoria Céspedes – siku (tracks 2, 8)
- Deepika – vocals (track 5)
- Andy Duncan – Latin percussion (track 2), didgeridoo (track 7), percussion (track 7)
- Ebony Steel Band – steel drums (track 2)
- Espiritu – vocals (tracks 4, 9)
- Kieran Kiely – accordion (track 2)
- London Community Gospel Choir (leader: Bazil Meade) – choir (track 4)
- The London Session Orchestra (leader: Gavyn Wright) – strings (tracks 4, 8, 9)
- Bob Murphy – bagpipes (track 2)
- Baluji Shrivastav – dilruba (track 5)
- John Themis – Spanish guitars (track 2), ruan (track 2), guitars (tracks 4, 9), saz (tracks 4, 9), tzouras (tracks 4, 9)
- Peter Thoms – trombone (track 2)
- Tony Visconti – recorders (track 3)
- Stephen Wick – tuba (track 2)

Technical

- Produced by Peter Oxendale
- Co-produced and arranged by Dario G
- Mixed by Dario G and Mark Tucker
- Engineer: Mark Tucker
- Assistant engineer: Steve Pelluet
- Mastered by Martin Giles at CTS Studios, London
- Pre-production at Sunchyme Studios, Cheshire
- Recorded and mixed at Lansdowne Recording Studios, London
- Photography: Andy Earle; assisted by Ted Humble-Smith
- Design by Edd Bettison at WEA

== Charts ==
Chart performance for Sunmachine
Chart (1998)	Peak position
Australian Albums (ARIA)	162
German Albums (Offizielle Top 100)	59
Hungarian Albums (MAHASZ)	13
Scottish Albums (OCC)	25
Swiss Albums (Schweizer Hitparade)	43
UK Albums (OCC)	26
