= Dario G =

UK musical group

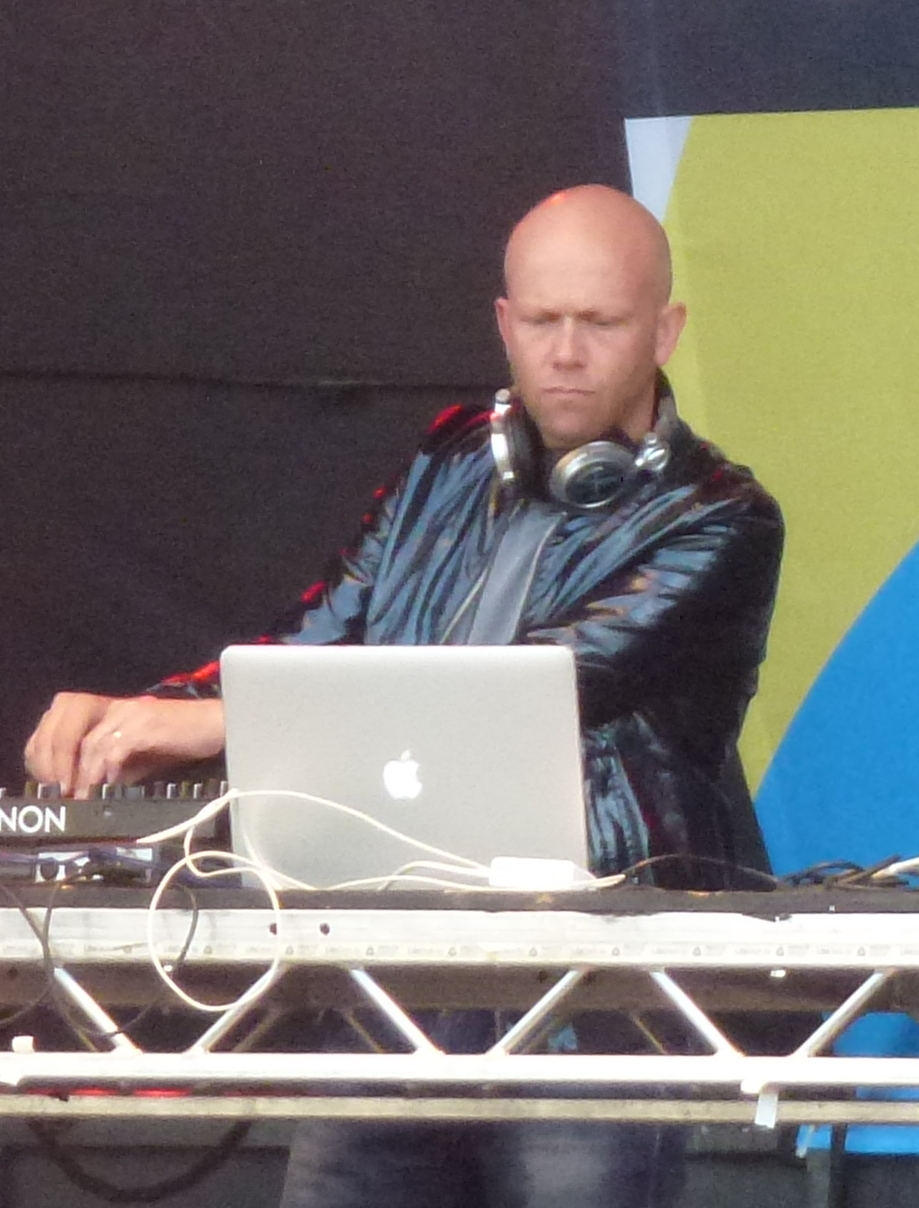
- Paul Spencer in 2016

Background information
- Origin: Crewe, Cheshire, England
- Genres: Dance; house; trance
- Years active: 1997–2024
- Labels: Warner Bros., Mercury, Front of House
- Past members: Paul Spencer; Scott Rosser; Stephen Spencer; Ingfrid Straumstøyl

Dario G were an English dance music group formed in Cheshire, England, consisting of three DJs and producers – Scott Rosser, Paul Spencer, and Stephen Spencer (no relation to Paul) – and vocalist Ingfrid Straumstøyl. The group rose to prominence in the late 1990s following the release of their debut single "Sunchyme", which reached number two in the United Kingdom, Scotland, Denmark and Switzerland. It reached number one on the US Billboard Bubbling Under Hot 100 charts, as well as reaching number one in Hungary and on the US Dance Club Songs chart.

The group released their debut album Sunmachine in 1998 and issued a further two singles from the album – "Carnaval de Paris" and "Sunmachine". Following the release of the album, members Rosser and Stephen Spencer departed to pursue other projects, leaving Paul Spencer to continue under the Dario G name as a solo act. In 2000, Dario G recorded the song "Voices", which featured on the soundtrack to the 2000 film The Beach.

In 2000, "Dream to Me" was released as the lead single from their second studio album, In Full Colour, with Straumstøyl debuting on lead vocals. "Dream to Me" reached number one in Romania, number four in Scotland, and number nine in the United Kingdom and Germany. Following a period of moderate chart success, Paul Spencer died in June 2024 following a diagnosis of stage four rectal cancer in 2023.

== History ==
=== Breakthrough (1997–2000) ===
The group changed their name from Dario to Dario G after being threatened with legal action from an artist of the same name. Dario G was named after the then manager of Crewe Alexandra F.C., Dario Gradi. Paul Spencer also said they added the G in tribute to the American smooth jazz saxophonist Kenny G. Rosser and Stephen Spencer later left to pursue other projects, leaving Paul Spencer to perform in a solo capacity under the Dario G name.

In 1997, they reached number two on the UK Singles Chart with "Sunchyme", a song built around a sample of "Life in a Northern Town", a number 15 hit for the Dream Academy in 1985. "Sunchyme" also reached number one on the US Hot Dance Club Party chart. The single sold over 600,000 copies in the United Kingdom alone, earning it a Platinum certification from the BPI, and was only kept from the top spot in the United Kingdom by Elton John's "Candle in the Wind", his 1997 tribute to Princess Diana. Internationally, "Sunchyme" sold over 1.5 million copies and was described as a "surprise" after the trio had initially hoped for "modest UK and Mediterranean success". It was also nominated for the Brit Award for British Video of the Year at the 18th Brit Awards ceremony, eventually losing to "Never Ever" by All Saints.

After signing with Warner Bros Records, the group were under pressure from the record label to record and release a debut album. Initially, the working title for their debut album was Super Dario Land. Band member Scott said that "they got together a plan for one, to be called Super Dario Land, and for three or four weeks, we thought we'd go for it as well – we actually started work on it on the day after the commercial release of 'Sunchyme' went into the charts, in mid‑September." In 1998, they released their debut album, Sunmachine, with their second single, the football-inspired "Carnaval de Paris", peaking at number five in the United Kingdom. The single was released to coincide with the 1998 FIFA World Cup in France. The song has since become frequently used during football events worldwide and at international football tournaments.

The group were keen to record an album that was different from "Sunchyme". Their record label at that time, Warner Bros, were said to have expected the debut album to be based around the sound that had led to their breakthrough single. However, Paul Spencer recalled that "record companies like to cash in on a big hit. They think 'OK, these guys can probably get another sample together quickly and churn out another record that sounds like the first one'". He also noted, "Warners did that with us too, at first, but we didn't want to do lots of little soundalike follow‑ups, we have got more depth than that".

Following the release of Sunmachine, Scott Rosser and Stephen Spencer left to pursue other projects, leaving Paul Spencer to continue as a solo artist under the Dario G name. In March 2000, their third single, "Voices", featuring vocals from Vanessa Quiñones and produced by Peter Oxendale, was used for the film The Beach.

=== In Full Colour (2000–2006) ===
In 2000, Dario G released "Dream to Me", with Straumstøyl making her debut as lead vocalist. The track is based on the song "Dreams" by the Cranberries. "Dream to Me" reached number nine on the UK Singles Chart and number nine in Germany. The release of "Dream to Me" is said to have "solidified his reputation as a master of euphoric dance music".

In November 2001, their next release, "Say What's on Your Mind", featured club mixes from Almighty Records and Stonebridge. In early 2003, Dario G released "Heaven Is Closer (Feels Like Heaven)", the second track with Straumstøyl on lead vocals. It is a remake of the 1980s hit "(Feels Like) Heaven" by Fiction Factory, and reached number 39 on the UK Singles Chart. Dario G released their second album, In Full Colour, in 2001.

A new version of "Carnaval de Paris" was released in 2002 for the World Cup in South Korea and Japan. A new single, "Ring of Fire", was promoted throughout Europe in 2006. It borrowed the main trumpet melody from the Johnny Cash recording of the same name. The single itself was released in September 2006.

=== Further projects (2006–2023) ===
In 2010, Dario G recorded a new song, "Game On", along with rapper Pitbull, for the Official FIFA 2010 World Cup soundtrack. On 23 February 2014, Dario G's single "We Got Music" was released. The song featured Shirley Bassey and received its first play on BBC Radio 2 on The Paul O'Grady Show.

=== Spencer's health and death (2023–2024) ===
In June 2023, Paul Spencer announced that he had been diagnosed with stage IV rectal cancer. He died a year later on 17 June 2024, at the age of 53.

== Discography ==
=== Studio albums ===
List of studio albums, with selected details and chart positions
Title	Details	Peak chart positions						
Title	Details	UK	AUS	GER	SWI	AUT	UK Dance	SCO
Sunmachine	Released: 8 June 1998; Label: Warner; Format: CD, LP, cassette tape	26	162	59	43	—	—	25
In Full Colour	Released: 18 June 2001; Label: Mercury; Format: CD, cassette tape, digital download	—	—	58	66	41	—	—
Hola	Released: 26 June 2020; Label: Front of House; Format: CD, LP, digital download	—	—	—	—	—	17	—
"—" denotes releases that did not chart or was not released in that country or territory.

=== Singles ===
List of singles, with selected chart positions and certifications
Title	Year	Peak chart positions										Certifications (sales thresholds)	Album
Title	Year	AUS	AUT	BEL (Fl)	FRA	GER	IRE	NLD	SWE	SWI	UK	Certifications (sales thresholds)	Album
"Sunchyme"	1997	22	4	5	28	3	3	17	41	2	2	ARIA: Gold; BPI: Platinum; BVMI: Platinum	Sunmachine
"Carnaval de Paris"	1998	90	24	10	26	2	4	7	36	7	5	BPI: Silver; BVMI: Gold	Sunmachine
"Sunmachine"	1998	—	—	—	—	98	—	—	—	—	17		Sunmachine
"Voices"	2000	—	—	—	—	—	—	—	—	—	37		The Beach (soundtrack)
"Dream to Me"	2001	96	8	38	—	9	16	50	—	15	9		In Full Colour
"Say What's on Your Mind"	2001	—	—	—	—	68	—	—	—	100	—		In Full Colour
"Carnaval 2002"	2002	—	—	—	—	—	36	—	—	96	34		Non-album singles
"Heaven Is Closer (Feels Like Heaven)"	2003	—	42	—	—	57	46	—	—	87	39		Non-album singles
"Ring of Fire"	2006	—	—	—	—	—	—	100	—	—	—		Non-album singles
"Game On" (with TKZee and Pitbull)	2010	—	—	—	—	—	—	—	—	—	—		2010 FIFA World Cup Album
"We Got Music" (with Shirley Bassey)	2014	—	—	—	—	—	—	—	—	—	—		Non-album single
"Cry"	2018	—	—	—	—	—	—	—	—	—	—		Hola
"Hola"	2019	—	—	—	—	—	—	—	—	—	—		Hola
"Real Love x Sunchyme" (with Clean Bandit and Jess Glynne)	2020	—	—	—	—	—	—	—	—	—	—		Non-album singles
"You Make the Sunrise" (with Leslie P George)	2020	—	—	—	—	—	—	—	—	—	—		Non-album singles
"Keep On Lovin" (with Sonique)	2021	—	—	—	—	—	—	—	—	—	—		Non-album singles
"Mi Rey (My King)"	2022	—	—	—	—	—	—	—	—	—	—		Non-album singles
"Come Alive (Carnaval de Paris)" (with Thomas Irwin)	2023	—	—	—	—	—	—	—	—	—	—		Non-album singles
"Savour the Miracle of Life"	2023	—	—	—	—	—	—	—	—	—	—		Non-album singles
"—" denotes releases that did not chart or were not released in that country.

== Awards and nominations ==
Year	Category	Recipient/Work	Result	Winner
1998	Video of the Year	"Sunchyme"	Nominated	"Never Ever" by All Saints

== See also ==
- List of number-one dance hits (United States)
- List of artists who reached number one on the US Dance chart
