= Carnaval de Paris =

1998 single by Dario G

Single by Dario G

from the album Sunmachine
- Released: 18 May 1998
- Recorded: January–April 1998
- Studio: Lansdowne (London, England)
- Length: 3:58
- Label: Eternal
- Songwriters: Paul Spencer; Scott Rosser; Stephen Spencer
- Producer: Peter Oxendale

Dario G singles chronology
"Sunchyme" (1997)	"Carnaval de Paris" (1998)	"Sunmachine" (1998)

"Carnaval de Paris" is a song by English electronic music trio Dario G. The song was recorded for the 1998 FIFA World Cup in France and was released as a single on 18 May 1998 in Europe. The following month, the track was issued in the United Kingdom and peaked at number five on the UK Singles Chart.

== Origins ==
The origins of the melody come from the world of football. During a 1996 pre-season tour of The Netherlands, Sheffield Wednesday F.C. picked up on a chant sung by the fans of FC Utrecht, with a tune inspired by the folk ballad "Oh My Darling, Clementine". This was then adapted and brought back to England for the following 1996–97 FA Premier League. The chant was sung extensively at the home game with Nottingham Forest on 18 November 1996 helped by the club's resident band. This was slowly picked up by other clubs in the Premier League, helped by the use of it at England matches (where the Sheffield Wednesday band were now invited to play). Sheffield Wednesday had already lost their "Barmy Army" chant to the England cricket team and also other football clubs. In an effort to either stem this spread of the song (or just to keep it unique), the fans of Sheffield Wednesday added their own lyrics to the theme (which continues to this day). This happened around the time of the Dario G single release.

== Usage ==
The song, however, has now spread around the world. Amongst the supporters' clubs which have used the tune have been those in Portsmouth, Leicester City F.C., Chicago Fire, VfL Bochum, Wellington Phoenix, Sydney FC, D.C. United, S.L. Benfica, GAIS, F.C. Copenhagen and Viborg FF. In fact, Section 8 Chicago, a supporters' club for Chicago Fire, supplied lyrics for the previously instrumental tune.

In addition, the track's distinctive percussive build up accompanied by the brass has become a standard across all tiers of English Football, however it is most commonly seen across the three EFL leagues. Stadium drummers use the drum beat as a post-goal celebration chant to build the atmosphere in the ground.

Despite the song's association with football, it has also seen extensive play in other sports, most notably in Rugby League, where several Super League clubs play the tune over the PA system after a successful try or conversion, including rivals Wigan Warriors and St Helens.

This song also appears like the soundtrack in the menu of Pro Evolution Soccer 2014, the video game by Konami. The song was also used in Ford adverts for the UEFA Champions League from 2001 to 2005.

== Music video ==
The music video features children painted in the colours of the representative countries participating in the tournament. For example, it depicts a group of Scottish children kicking off a match against Brazilian children while playing bagpipes, mirroring the opening game at France 1998. A subsequent scene involving Jamaican children is set to music with steel drums.

== Track listings ==
UK CD single

1. "Carnaval de Paris" (radio mix) – 3:58
2. "Carnaval de Paris" (SRS radio edit) – 3:57
3. "Carnaval de Paris" (12-inch mix) – 5:05
4. "Carnaval de Paris" (SRS mix) – 5:00
5. "Carnaval de Paris" (Tall Paul mix) – 8:11
6. "Carnaval de Paris" (JDS 6-inch mix) – 6:41

UK 12-inch single

A1. "Carnaval de Paris" (SRS mix) – 5:00
A2. "Carnaval de Paris" (JDS 6-inch mix) – 6:41
B1. "Carnaval de Paris" (Tall Paul mix) – 8:11

UK cassette single

1. "Carnaval de Paris" (SRS mix) – 5:00
2. "Carnaval de Paris" (12-inch mix) – 5:05

European CD single

1. "Carnaval de Paris" (radio mix) – 3:58
2. "Carnaval de Paris" (SRS mix) – 5:00

Australian CD single

1. "Carnaval de Paris" (radio mix) – 3:58
2. "Carnaval de Paris" (SRS radio edit) – 3:57
3. "Carnaval de Paris" (12-inch mix) – 5:05
4. "Carnaval de Paris" (SRS mix) – 5:00
5. "Carnaval de Paris" (Tall Paul mix) – 8:11
6. "Carnaval de Paris" (JDS 6-inch mix) – 6:41
7. "Sunchyme" (Sash! remix edit) – 3:33

== Credits and personnel ==
Credits are lifted from the UK CD single liner notes.

Studios

- Pre-produced at Sunchyme Studios (Cheshire, England) from September 1997 to January 1998
- Recorded and mixed at Lansdowne Studios (London, England) from January to April 1998
- Mastered at Masterpiece (London, England)

Personnel

- Paul Spencer – writing
- Scott Rosser – writing
- Stephen Spencer – writing
- Ebony Steel Band – steel drums
- Bob Murphy – bagpipes
- John Themis – Chung ruan, Spanish guitars
- Andy Duncan – Battacuda and Latin percussion
- Pete Thoms – trombone
- Stuart Brooks – trumpet
- Kieran Kiely – accordion
- Stephen Wick – tuba
- Victoria C'espedes – sikus (Bolivian pan-pipes)
- Peter Oxendale – production
- Dario G – co-production, arrangement, mixing
- Mark Tucker – mixing, engineering
- Steve Pelluet – assistant engineering
- Jacko – mastering
- Edd – artwork design
- Paul Myatt – photography

== Charts ==
=== Weekly charts ===
Chart (1998)	Peak position
Australia (ARIA)	90
Austria (Ö3 Austria Top 40)	24
Belgium (Ultratop 50 Flanders)	10
Belgium (Ultratop 50 Wallonia)	19
Europe (Eurochart Hot 100)	2
Finland (Suomen virallinen lista)	3
France (SNEP)	26
Germany (GfK)	2
Hungary (Mahasz)	4
Iceland (Íslenski Listinn Topp 40)	15
Ireland (IRMA)	4
Italy (Musica e dischi)	7
Netherlands (Dutch Top 40)	6
Netherlands (Single Top 100)	7
New Zealand (Recorded Music NZ)	32
Poland Airplay (Music & Media)	17
Scottish Singles Sales (Official Charts)	1
Sweden (Sverigetopplistan)	36
Switzerland (Schweizer Hitparade)	7
UK Singles (Official Charts)	5

=== Year-end charts ===
Chart (1998)	Position
Belgium (Ultratop 50 Flanders)	86
Europe (Eurochart Hot 100)	67
Germany (Media Control)	28
Netherlands (Dutch Top 40)	61
Netherlands (Single Top 100)	69

== Release history ==
Region	Date	Format(s)	Label(s)	Ref.
Europe	18 May 1998	CD	Eternal	
United Kingdom	8 June 1998	12-inch vinyl; CD; cassette	Eternal	
Japan	10 June 1998	CD	AWA Japan	
