= Anna Trebunskaya =

Russian-American dancer (born 1980)

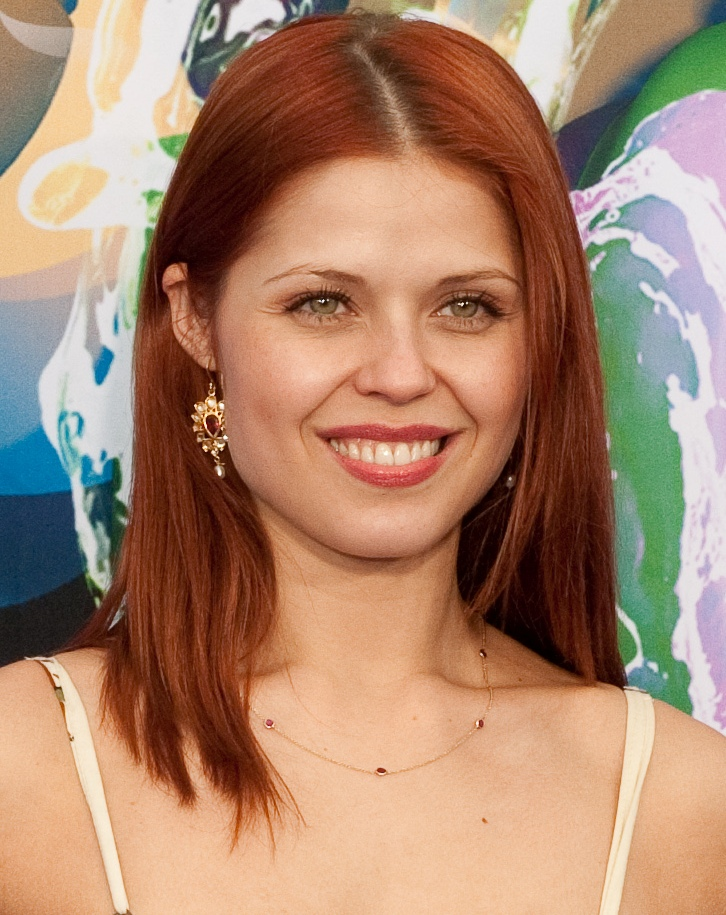
- Trebunskaya in 2010
- Born: December 28, 1980 (age 45); Chelyabinsk, Russian SFSR, Soviet Union
- Occupations: Dancer, actress
- Spouse: Jonathan Roberts (m. 2003; sep. 2012)
- Partner: Nevin Millan (2013–present)
- Children: 2
- Parents: Oleg Trebunski (father); Irina Trebunskaya (mother)

Anna Olegovna Trebunskaya (Russian: Анна Олеговна Требунская, IPA: [ˈanːɐ ɐˈlʲeɡəvnə trʲɪˈbunskəjə]; born 28 December 1980) is a Russian-born American professional ballroom and Latin dancer, known for her appearances on Dancing with the Stars. She now lives in Los Angeles and dances in the International Latin style.

== Personal life ==
Anna Trebunskaya was born December 28, 1980, in Chelyabinsk. Her parents, Oleg Trebunski and Irina Trebunskaya, owned a dance studio and were professional ballroom dancers. Having begun dancing at the age of six, their daughter entered and won her first competition when she was seven. She moved to the United States with her parents when she was 17 years old to pursue her career as a professional dancer. She won her first US title of Amateur Standard Youth Championship in 1997 later becoming a professional competitor in the year 2000. Trebunskaya resides in California. She and her mother own a dance studio in Hermosa Beach, California.

In October 2012, after nine years of marriage, Trebunskaya and dancer Jonathan Roberts announced that they had separated and planned to divorce. Trebunskaya subsequently began a relationship with actor Nevin Millan. She gave birth to their daughter, Amalya Millan, on January 18, 2014. She gave birth to son Kaspyan on 2 September 2017.

== Career ==
=== Professional ballroom competitions ===
In 2007, Trebunskaya and her partner Pavlo Barsuk took 6th place at the International Latin finals in America's Ballroom Challenge. Over the next several years, she continued to garner the attention of the ballroom community through a series of similar successes.

=== Dancing with the Stars ===
In Season 2, she partnered football star Jerry Rice, and together they came in second to pop star Drew Lachey and Cheryl Burke. Trebunskaya and her husband Jonathan Roberts also performed together on results shows in its first three seasons. Trebunskaya returned to Dancing with the Stars for its fifth season and her celebrity partner was model Albert Reed. They were the second couple eliminated from the competition. Trebunskaya competed on Season 6 of Dancing with the Stars and her celebrity partner was actor Steve Guttenberg. She and Guttenberg were the third couple to be eliminated. In Season 9, her partner was UFC fighter Chuck Liddell. She and Liddell were the sixth couple to be eliminated. In Season 10, she competed with US Olympic Figure Skating Gold Medalist Evan Lysacek. They finished in 2nd place to pop star Nicole Scherzinger and Derek Hough. In Season 11, Trebunskaya was partnered with football quarterback Kurt Warner. They placed 5th overall and were the 8th couple eliminated. For the twelfth season, Trebunskaya was partnered with boxing legend, Sugar Ray Leonard. They were the third couple eliminated. For the thirteenth season, Trebunskaya was partnered with fashion guru Carson Kressley. They were the fifth couple eliminated. In season 14, she was partnered with soap opera star Jack Wagner. They were the second couple eliminated from the competition. For season 15, she was partnered with season 2 winner Drew Lachey, they were eliminated in week 3 of competition on a double elimination week.

On September 2, 2015, Trebunskaya was announced as returning pro for season 21 after a 5-season hiatus. She was paired with actor Gary Busey. They were eliminated on Week 4 and finished in 10th place.

On October 24, 2023, Trebunskaya returned to the show's thirty-second season, joining a group of original DWTS pro-dancers, performing a special group tribute, a choreographed group performance, dancing to "Moon River"; the number was dedicated in memory of head judge Len Goodman, who died in April 2023. Goodman's widow, Sue, was in the audience.

Season	Partner	Place
2	Jerry Rice	2nd
5	Albert Reed	11th
6	Steve Guttenberg	10th
9	Chuck Liddell	11th
10	Evan Lysacek	2nd
11	Kurt Warner	5th
12	Sugar Ray Leonard	9th
13	Carson Kressley	8th
14	Jack Wagner	11th
15	Drew Lachey	11th
21	Gary Busey	10th

=== With Jerry Rice ===
- Average: 23.09

Week #	Dance/Song	Judges' score			Result
Week #	Dance/Song	Inaba	Goodman	Tonioli	Result
1	Cha-Cha-Cha/ "I Like It"	7	7	7	Safe
2	Quickstep/ "If My Friends Could See Me Now"	7	8	8	Safe
3	Jive/ "Do You Love Me"	7	6	6	Safe
4	Foxtrot/ "Why Don't You Do Right"	8	8	8	Safe
5	Samba/ "For Once in My Life"	7	8	8	Safe
6	Paso Doble/ "Espana Cani"	8	7	8	Safe
7	Tango/ "One Way or Another"; Rumba/ "Un-Break My Heart"	7; 7	7; 7	6; 7	Safe
8	Foxtrot/ "Why Don't You Do Right"; Freestyle/ "Celebration"; Cha-Cha-Cha/ "Think"	9; 9; 9	9; 9; 9	8; 9; 9	Runner-Up

=== With Albert Reed ===
- Average: 21.0

Week #	Dance/Song	Judges' score			Result
Week #	Dance/Song	Inaba	Goodman	Tonioli	Result
1	Cha-Cha-Cha/ "A Little Less Conversation"	7	7	7	Safe
2	Quickstep/ "99 Red Balloons"	7	7	7	Eliminated

=== With Steve Guttenberg ===
- Average: 18.3

Week #	Dance/Song	Judges' score			Result
Week #	Dance/Song	Inaba	Goodman	Tonioli	Result
1	Foxtrot/ "(Up A) Lazy River"	6	6	6	No Elimination
2	Mambo/ "I Got a Girl"	6	5	5	Safe
3	Tango/ "Jalousie"	7	7	7	Eliminated

=== With Chuck Liddell ===
- Average: 17.25

Week #	Dance/Song	Judges' score			Result
Week #	Dance/Song	Inaba	Goodman	Tonioli	Result
1	Foxtrot/ "That's Life"; Salsa relay/ "Get Busy"	6 Awarded	5; 6	5 Points	Safe
2	Tango/"Seven Nation Army"	6	7*	6	Safe
3	Samba/"Mas Que Nada"	6	5	6	Safe
4	Two-Step/"Boot Scootin' Boogie"	6	5	6	Eliminated

- Score was awarded by stand in judge Baz Luhrmann

=== With Evan Lysacek ===
- Average: 26.3

Week #	Dance/Song	Judges' score			Result
Week #	Dance/Song	Inaba	Goodman	Tonioli	Result
1	Viennese Waltz/"I'll Be"	8	7	8	No elimination
2	Jive/"Best Damn Thing"	8	8	8	Safe
3	Quickstep/"Hot Honey Rag"	9	8	9	Safe
4*	Tango/"Wait a Minute"	9; 9	8; 8	9; 9	Safe
5	Rumba/"I Don't Want to Miss a Thing"	9	9	9	Safe
6	Samba/"Hey Mama"; Swing/"In the Mood"	7 Awarded	7; 6	7 Points	Safe
7	Argentine Tango/"Bust Your Windows"; Team Cha-Cha-Cha/"Holiday"	10; 8	10; 8	10; 8	Safe
8	Waltz/"Open Arms"; Futuristic Cha-Cha-Cha/"Bulletproof"	9; 9	9; 8	9; 9	Safe
9 Semi-finals	Foxtrot/"I've Got the World on a String"; Paso Doble/"Bring Me to Life"	10; 10	9; 10	10; 10	Safe
10; Finals	Viennese Waltz/"Piano Man"; Freestyle/"Footloose"; Argentine Tango/"Bust Your Windows"; Quickstep/"I Want You To Want Me"	10; 8; 9; 10	9; 8; 9; 9	9; 8; 10; 9	Runner-up

- For week 4 there was a technical and performance score.

=== With Kurt Warner ===
- Average: 21.63

Week #	Dance/Song	Judges' score			Result
Week #	Dance/Song	Inaba	Goodman	Tonioli	Result
1	Viennese Waltz/"This Ain't a Love Song"	7	5	7	Safe
2	Jive/"Danger Zone"	7	7	7	Safe
3	Foxtrot/"Bad Day"	8	8	7	Safe
4	Rumba/"Drops of Jupiter"	5/7	5/6	5/6	Safe
5	Quickstep/"Bewitched Theme"	8	8	8	Safe
6	Paso Doble/"The Final Countdown"; Rock 'n Roll/"La Grange"	6 Awarded	6; 4	6 Points	Safe
7	Team Cha-Cha-Cha/"Bust A Move"; Tango/"Simply Irresistible"	9; 10/8	9; 8	9; 8	Safe
8	Waltz/"Take It to the Limit"; Cha-Cha-Cha/"Hella Good"	8; 8	8; 8	8; 8	Eliminated

- For Week 4 there were scores for both Technique and Performance

=== With Sugar Ray Leonard ===
- Average: 18.75

Week #	Dance/Song	Judges' score			Result
Week #	Dance/Song	Inaba	Goodman	Tonioli	Result
1	Foxtrot/"The Power of Love"	6	5	6	No Elimination
2	Jive/"Sweet Soul Music"	6	5	6	Last to be called safe
3	Paso Doble/"My Prerogative"	7	6	7	Safe
4	Viennese Waltz/"Waltz of the Flowers"	7	7	7	Eliminated

=== With Carson Kressley ===
- Average: 19.4

Week #	Dance/Song	Judges' score			Result
Week #	Dance/Song	Inaba	Goodman	Tonioli	Result
1	Cha-Cha-Cha/"Moves Like Jagger"	6	5	6	Safe
2	Quickstep/"Walkin' Back to Happiness"	6	6	6	Safe
3	Tango/"It's My Life"	8	7	8	Safe
4	Viennese Waltz/Theme from "Pirates of the Caribbean: The Curse of the Black Pearl"	7	6	7	Safe
5	Jive/"Wake Me Up Before You Go-Go"	6	6	7	Eliminated

=== With Jack Wagner ===
- Average: 22.6

Week #	Dance/Song	Judges' score			Result
Week #	Dance/Song	Inaba	Goodman	Tonioli	Result
1	Foxtrot/"Sugar Town"	8	7	8	No Elimination
2	Jive/"Gimme Some Lovin"	7	7	7	Safe
3	Samba/"Lighting Up the Night"	8	8	8	Eliminated

=== With Drew Lachey ===
- Average: 22.7

Week #	Dance/Song	Judges' score			Result
Week #	Dance/Song	Inaba	Goodman	Tonioli	Result
1	Foxtrot/"Love Song"	7	7	7.5	Bottom Two
2	Jive/"Dance, Dance"	7.5	7.5	7.5	Safe
3	Cha-Cha-Cha/"Crazy in Love"	8	8	8	Eliminated

=== With Gary Busey ===
- Average: 16.4

Week #	Dance/Song	Judges' score			Result
Week #	Dance/Song	Inaba	Hough	Tonioli	Result
1	Cha-Cha-Cha/ "Dancing in the Street"	5	5	5	No Elimination
2	Foxtrot / "Wouldn't It Be Nice"; Paso Doble / "1812 Overture"	6; 5	6; 5	6; 5	Last to be called safe
3	Tango / "The Addams Family Theme"	6	7^{1}/6	6	Safe
4	Jazz / "That'll Be the Day"	5	6	5	Eliminated

^{1}Score given by guest judge Alfonso Ribeiro.

=== Achievements ===
with Pavlo Barsuk

- 2008 U.S. National Professional Latin Finalist, 3rd place (Professional Latin)
- 2008 Open to the world U.S Open Latin Finalist
- 2008 Blackpool Rising Star Latin Finalist
- 2008 UK Rising Star Latin Finalist, 2nd place ( Professional Latin)
- 2008 International Grand Ball Latin Champion
- 2007 U.S National Professional Latin Finalist

with Jonathan Roberts

- 2004 USA Rising Star Latin Champions
- 2003 Blackpool Rising Star Latin Finalist

with Vitali Koulik

- 1998 U.S. National Amateur Youth Ballroom Champion and Representative to the World

== Film & TV appearances ==
The Newsroom - Season 3, Episode 5 (airport ticket agent)

Awards and achievements
Preceded by John O'Hurley & Charlotte Jørgensen Mýa & Dmitry Chaplin	Dancing with the Stars (US) runner up Season 2 (Spring 2006 with Jerry Rice) Season 10 (Spring 2010 with Evan Lysacek)	Succeeded by Mario Lopez & Karina Smirnoff Kyle Massey & Lacey Schwimmer
Preceded by Niecy Nash & Louis Van Amstel	Dancing with the Stars (US) quarter-finalist Season 11 (Fall 2010 with Kurt Warner)	Succeeded by Romeo & Chelsie Hightower
