= Sunchyme =

1997 single by Dario G

Single by Dario G

from the album Sunmachine
- B-side: "Chyme"
- Released: 15 September 1997
- Genre: House
- Length: 3:54
- Label: Eternal
- Songwriters: Paul Spencer; Scott Rosser; Stephen Spencer; Nick Laird-Clowes; Gilbert Gabriel
- Producer: Peter Oxendale

Dario G singles chronology
"Sunchyme" (1997)	"Carnaval de Paris" (1998)

Music video
- "Sunchyme" on YouTube

"Sunchyme" is a song by British electronic music trio Dario G. It was released as their debut single on 15 September 1997 by Eternal Records, serving as the lead single from their debut studio album, Sunmachine (1998). The song heavily samples the track "Life in a Northern Town" by dream pop band the Dream Academy. "Sunchyme" entered the top five on many European music charts, including the UK Singles Chart, peaking at number two for two nonconsecutive weeks. It also topped the US Billboard Dance Club Play chart following its American release in 1998.

== Critical reception ==
Larry Flick from Billboard magazine wrote, "Import enthusiasts are already well-aware of this spunky, Euro-splashed instrumental, which draws its hook from The Dream Academy's 1985 hit "Life in a Northern Town". First heard several months ago on the U.K.'s Eternal Records, this track is already making the rounds on crossover radio stations and mix shows." He concluded with that it "has the juice to become a massive top 40 hit." A reviewer from Music Week gave "Sunchyme" a score of four out of five, noting that "this catchy, uplifting house track is already attracting heavy airplay from Radio One and Capital, and is guaranteed to cross over into chart success."

Music Week editor Alan Jones praised it as "a gem, with the potential to go to the very top." Tim Jeffery from the Record Mirror Dance Update rated the song with five out of five, naming it "unashamed pop dance at its simplest and best". He added, "It'll have virtually everyone wincing and complaining that it's nothing to do with the "proper" dance scene while they observe entire clubs with their hands raised, belting out the chorus and generally going potty. Love it or loath [sic] it, you'll be hearing this from now until Christmas, and even beyond." In 2025, Classic Pop magazine ranked "Sunchyme" number 11 in their list of "Top 20 80s Sampling Hits".

== Music video ==
The accompanying music video for "Sunchyme" features a tribe of African people having their bodies covered with colourful paint to portray the animals of their native land (as well as tigers, which are not native to Africa). Later, they jump into a river to wash away the paint. At the 18th BRIT Awards ceremony, the music video was nominated for the Brit Award for British Video of the Year, but lost to "Never Ever" by All Saints.

== Track listings ==
- UK, US, and Australian CD single
1. "Sunchyme" (radio edit) – 3:54
2. "Sunchyme" (original) – 8:28
3. "Chyme" – 3:39
- UK cassette single
1. "Sunchyme" (radio edit) – 3:54
2. "Chyme" – 3:39
3. "Sunchyme" (The Boy Dunne Good edit) – 4:23
- UK 12-inch single

A. "Sunchyme" (original) – 8:28
AA. "Sunchyme" (remapped by Coloured Oxygen) – 12:28

- European CD single
1. "Sunchyme" (radio edit) – 3:54
2. "Sunchyme" (original) – 8:28

== Charts ==
=== Weekly charts ===
Chart (1997–1998)	Peak position
Australia (ARIA)	22
Austria (Ö3 Austria Top 40)	4
Belgium (Ultratop 50 Flanders)	5
Belgium (Ultratop 50 Wallonia)	15
Canada Dance/Urban (RPM)	3
Denmark (IFPI)	2
Europe (Eurochart Hot 100)	4
France (SNEP)	28
Germany (GfK)	3
Hungary (Mahasz)	1
Iceland (Íslenski Listinn Topp 40)	21
Ireland (IRMA)	3
Italy (Musica e dischi)	11
Italy Airplay (Music & Media)	6
Netherlands (Dutch Top 40)	8
Netherlands (Single Top 100)	17
New Zealand (Recorded Music NZ)	4
Scottish Singles Sales (Official Charts)	2
Sweden (Sverigetopplistan)	41
Switzerland (Schweizer Hitparade)	2
UK Singles (Official Charts)	2
UK Dance (Official Charts)	3
US Bubbling Under Hot 100 (Billboard)	1
US Dance Club Songs (Billboard)	1
US Dance Singles Sales (Billboard)	7

=== Year-end charts ===
Chart (1997)	Position
Belgium (Ultratop 50 Flanders)	48
Belgium (Ultratop 50 Wallonia)	76
Europe (Eurochart Hot 100)	40
Germany (Media Control)	44
Netherlands (Dutch Top 40)	90
Netherlands (Single Top 100)	100
UK Singles (OCC)	19

Chart (1998)	Position
Canada Dance (RPM)	40
Europe (Eurochart Hot 100)	97
Germany (Media Control)	76
Switzerland (Schweizer Hitparade)	29
US Dance Club Play (Billboard)	28
US Maxi-Singles Sales (Billboard)	44

== Certifications ==
Region	Certification	Certified units/sales
Australia (ARIA)	Gold	35,000^{^}
Belgium (BRMA)	Gold	25,000^{*}
Germany (BVMI)	Platinum	500,000^{^}
New Zealand (RMNZ)	Gold	5,000^{*}
United Kingdom (BPI)	2× Platinum	1,200,000^{‡}
^{*} Sales figures based on certification alone.^{^} Shipments figures based on certification alone.^{‡} Sales+streaming figures based on certification alone.

== See also ==
- List of number-one dance singles of 1998 (U.S.)
