= Peter Oxendale =

English musicologist

Peter Oxendale (born 1950 or 1951 (age 75–76)) is an English forensic musicologist and an expert witness on copyright infringement in music. He was involved as an expert in the notable Blurred Lines lawsuit. He was a keyboardist in the glam rock bands Sparks and Jet and musical director for Chris de Burgh. Oxendale also played keyboards on Ian Hunter's Overnight Angels album in 1977. He also played keyboards for the new wave bands Dead or Alive and Frankie Goes to Hollywood. In 1983, he served as touring keyboardist for John Foxx. In 1983/4, he appeared numerous times on Top of the Pops as part of Bonnie Tyler's band on her long running number one hit "Total Eclipse of the Heart".

== Sources ==
- Easlea, Daryl (2010), "What Happened Next", Talent is an Asset: The Story of Sparks, Music Sales Limited, ISBN 9780857122377
- Talevski, N. (2010), Rock Obituaries – Knocking On Heaven's Door, Omnibus, ISBN 978-0-85712-117-2
