= Anjulie discography =

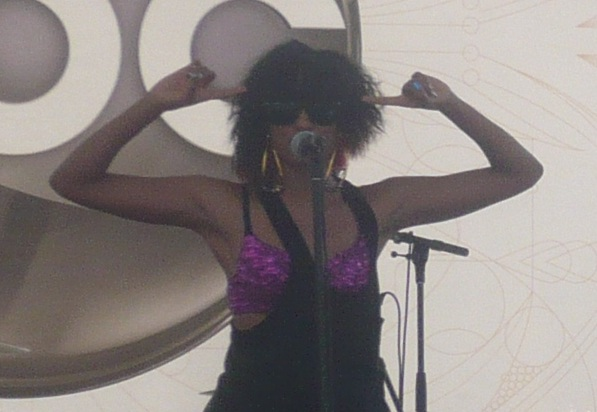
- Anjulie performing in 2010
- Studio albums: 1
- EPs: 3
- Singles: 71
- Music videos: 9
- Other appearances: 8

The discography of Anjulie, a Canadian pop music singer-songwriter, consists of one studio album, three extended plays, seventy-one singles (including eleven as a featured artist) and nine music videos. Anjulie began her career as a songwriter, penning tracks for several artists in the mid-2000s with Jon Levine. Together, they co-wrote songs for artists including The Philosopher Kings and Kreesha Turner.

Her self-titled debut studio album was released in August 2009. It reached number 108 on the United States Billboard 200 chart. Three singles, "Boom", "Love Songs" and "Rain", were released from the album: "Boom" peaked at number one on the US Hot Dance Club Songs chart. In early 2011, Anjulie released the single "Brand New Bitch". The song reached number 16 in Canada and was certified platinum by Music Canada (MC). Persaud co-wrote the 2012 single "The Boys", which peaked at #41 on the Billboard Hot R&B/Hip-Hop Songs chart, and the song "Behind the Music" featured on the US release of Cher Lloyd's debut album Sticks and Stones, in 2012.

== Studio albums ==
List of studio albums, with selected details and chart positions
Title	Album details	Peak chart positions	
Title	Album details	US	US Heat
Anjulie	Released: August 4, 2009 (CAN); Label: Hear Music (HMCD30498); Formats: CD, DD	108	2

== Extended plays ==
List of extended plays, with selected details
Title	EP details
Boom	Released: 2008 (CAN); Label: Hear Music; Formats: DD
How It Feels to Lose You, Pt. 1	Released: February 15, 2019 (CAN); Label: Spinnin; Formats: DD
Loveless Metropolis	Released: March 16, 2022 (CAN); Label: Anjuliemusic; Formats: CD, DD

== Singles ==
=== As lead artist ===
List of singles as lead artist, with selected chart positions and certifications, showing year released and album name
Title	Year	Peak chart positions					Certifications	Album
Title	Year	CAN	CAN AC	CAN CHR	CAN Hot AC	US Dance	Certifications	Album
"Day Will Soon Come"	2008	—	—	—	—	—		Anjulie and Boom (EP)
"Boom"	2008	—	—	—	—	1		Anjulie and Boom (EP)
"Rain"	2009	—	—	—	—	3		Anjulie
"Love Songs"	2009	—	—	—	—	8		Anjulie and Boom (EP)
"Brand New Bitch"	2011	16	—	7	12	3	MC: Platinum	Non-album singles
"Stand Behind the Music"	2011	54	—	30	38	—		Non-album singles
"Headphones"	2012	—	—	—	—	—		Non-album singles
"You and I"	2012	25	25	12	10	—		Non-album singles
"Allison"	2013	—	—	—	—	—		Non-album singles
"Falling in Love Again"	2015	—	—	43	—	—		Non-album singles
"Dragonflies"	2016	—	—	—	—	—		Non-album singles
"Golden Handcuffs" (featuring Rmdy)	2016	—	—	—	—	—		Non-album singles
"Emotional"	2017	—	—	—	—	—		Non-album singles
"Just Words" (with KOWL)	2017	—	—	—	—	—		Non-album singles
"Where The Love Goes" (featuring Oskar Flood)	2017	—	—	—	—	—		Non-album singles
"Dream Again"	2017	—	—	—	—	—		Non-album singles
"Where the Water Ends" (with VINAI)	2017	—	—	—	—	—		Non-album singles
"Baghdad"	2017	—	—	—	—	—		Non-album singles
"Criminal"	2017	—	—	—	—	—		Non-album singles
"Dancing With Girls"	2018	—	—	—	—	—		Non-album singles
"DWG"	2018	—	—	—	—	—		Non-album singles
"The Morning" (with Alex Lustig)	2018	—	—	—	—	—		Non-album singles
"All We Can Do" (with Pusher)	2018	—	—	—	—	—		Non-album singles
"Hold Me Down"	2018	—	—	—	—	—		Non-album singles
"Lose Me"	2018	—	—	—	—	—		Non-album singles
"Danger"	2018	—	—	—	—	—		Non-album singles
"Show Me" (with Sandro Silva)	2018	—	—	—	—	—		Non-album singles
"Control" (with BISHU)	2019	—	—	—	—	—		Hali 2 Cali (EP)
"Glory"	2019	—	—	—	—	—		How It Feels to Lose You, Pt. 1
"God Complex"	2019	—	—	—	—	—		How It Feels to Lose You, Pt. 1
"Eyes Closed"	2019	—	—	—	—	—		How It Feels to Lose You, Pt. 1
"Inside"	2019	—	—	—	—	—		How It Feels to Lose You, Pt. 1
"Stronger" (with TheFatRat and Slaydit)	2019	—	—	—	—	—		Non-album singles
"Close To The Sun" (with TheFatRat)	2019	—	—	—	—	—		Non-album singles
"Holy Water" (with Natalia Lafourcade featuring Phyno)	2019	—	—	—	—	—		Non-album singles
"FUYL"	2020	—	—	—	—	—		Loveless Metropolis
"Suns Out"	2020	—	—	—	—	—		Non-album single
"Loveless Metropolis"	2020	—	—	—	—	—		Loveless Metropolis
"Mondays"	2020	—	—	—	—	—		Non-album singles
"Do Better"	2021	—	—	—	—	—		Non-album singles
"Ugly Man"	2021	—	—	—	—	—		Loveless Metropolis
"Zen"	2021	—	—	—	—	—		Loveless Metropolis
"Assholeholic"	2021	—	—	—	—	—		Loveless Metropolis
"Magnetic"	2021	—	—	—	—	—		Non-album singles
"Big Bad World"	2021	—	—	—	—	—		Non-album singles
"No Wifey"	2021	—	—	—	—	—		Loveless Metropolis
"Ordinary People" (with Menny Flores)	2022	—	—	—	—	—		Non-album singles
"White Lights"	2022	—	—	—	—	—		Non-album singles
"Mango" (with Soaky Siren and Sak Pase)	2023	—	—	—	—	—		Non-album singles
"Believe It" (with Lexnour)	2023	—	—	—	—	—		Non-album singles
"In the Quiet"	2023	—	—	—	—	—		Non-album singles
"The Machine"	2024	—	—	—	—	—		Non-album singles
"Chai and Sunshine" (with Yanchan Produced)	2024	—	—	—	—	—		Non-album singles
"Things I Used to Know"	2024	—	—	—	—	—		Non-album singles
"Hard to Love You" (with Zach Zoya and Yanchan Produced)	2024	—	—	—	—	—		Non-album singles
"Therapy"	2024	—	—	—	—	—		Non-album singles
"Sweetest Love of All"	2025	—	—	—	—	—		Non-album singles
"Love Bomb Me"	2025	—	—	—	—	—		Non-album singles
"Cinnamon Girl"	2025	—	—	—	—	—		Non-album singles
"Steady" (featuring Alpha P and Killertunes)	2025	—	—	—	—	—		Non-album singles
"Freedom" (with Leon Taro and Sugar Jesus)	2025	—	—	—	—	—		Non-album singles
"Tell My Lips"	2026	—	—	—	—	—		Non-album singles
"—" denotes a single that failed to chart.

=== As featured artist ===
List of singles as featured artist, with other artists, showing year released and album name
Title	Year	Other artist(s)	Album
"The Prestige"	2014	tyDi	Non-album singles
"Where the Water Ends"	2016	Vinai	Non-album singles
"Into the Fire"	2016	Vinai	Non-album singles
"Arrows in the Dark"	2016	Cash Cash	Blood, Sweat & 3 Years
"Supernatural"	2016	Boombox Cartel and Quix	Non-album single
"Crazy Maybe"	2017	Feed Me and Kill the Noise	Feed Me's Existential Crisis (EP)
"Fly Away"	2017	TheFatRat	Non-album single
"Changes"	2018	Classified	Tomorrow Could Be...
"The In Between"	2018	Elephante	Glass Mansion
"Alone"	2019	Marnik, KSHMR, and Jeffrey Jey	Non-album singles
"Ghosts"	2019	The MVI	Non-album singles

== Music videos ==
List of music videos, showing year released and director
Title	Year	Director(s)
"Boom"	2008	Adria Petty
"Love Songs"	2009	Matt Robertson
"Rain"	2009	Adria Petty
"Addicted2Me"	2010	Yoram Benz
"Brand New Bitch"	2011	Hannah Lux Davis
"Stand Behind the Music"	2011	Hannah Lux Davis
"Headphones"	2012	Sammy Rawal
"You and I"	2012	Ray Wong
"Where The Love Goes"	2017	Unknown

== Other appearances ==
List of non-single appearances, with other performing artists, showing year released and album name
Title	Year	Other artist(s)	Album
"J'Veux M'en Aller"	2008	Koriass and Boogat	Les Racines dans le Béton
"Fire in Freetown"	2009	K'naan	Troubadour
"Big Things"	2009	—N/a	Fame Soundtrack
"Behind the Music"	2012	Cher Lloyd	Sticks + Stones
"The Prestige"	2014	tyDi	—N/a
"Into the Fire"	2016	Vinai	—N/a
"Arrows in the Dark"	2016	Cash Cash	Blood, Sweat & 3 Years
"Crazy Maybe"	2017	Feed Me	Feed Me's Existential Crisis

== Songwriting credits ==
List of songwriting credits, with performing artists and co-writers, showing year released and album name
Year	Title	Artist(s)	Album	Written with
2005	"Say Goodbye to Jr High"	Emma Roberts	Unfabulous & More	–
2005	"Not That Man"	The Philosopher Kings	Castles	The Philosopher Kings
2008	"Chains of Love"	Kreesha Turner	Passion	Jon Levine, Kreesha Turner
2008	"Don't Call Me Baby"	Kreesha Turner	Passion	Jon Levine
2008	"Beautiful"	Kreesha Turner	Passion	Jon Levine, Kreesha Turner
2010	"Didn't See You Coming"	Fefe Dobson	Joy	Fefe Dobson, Jon Levine
2012	"The Boys	Nicki Minaj and Cassie	Pink Friday: Roman Reloaded – The Re-Up	Onika Maraj, Jonas Jeberg, Jean Baptiste
2012	"Walking On Eggshells"	Esthero	Everything Is Expensive	Jon Levine
2012	"Behind the Music"	Cher Lloyd	Sticks and Stones (North American version)	Jon Levine
2013	"In the Stars"	Icona Pop	This Is... Icona Pop	Jarrad "Jaz" Rogers, Fransisca Hall
2013	"3000 Miles"	Emblem3	Nothing To Lose	Ross Golan, Jon Levine
2013	"Donatella"	Lady Gaga	Artpop	Lady Gaga, Anton Zaslavski
2015	"In the Blue"	Kelly Clarkson	Piece by Piece (Deluxe Edition)	Kelly Clarkson, Jesse Shatkin, Fransisca Hall
2015	"Man Killer"	Hedley	Hello	Jacob Hoggard, Jon Levine
2016	"Where Do We Go"	Lion Babe	Begin	Robin Hannibal, Itai Shapira, Jillian Hervey, Lucas Goodman
2017	"Believer"	Lea Michele	Places	Fransisca Hall, Jesse Shatkin
2018	"F**k It Tho"	Keshia Chanté	Unbound 02	Matthew Burnett, Tayla Parx, Yonatan “XSDTRK” Ayal
2023	"Eat Your Man"	Dom Dolla with Nelly Furtado	Non-album singles	Dominic Matheson, Nelly Furtado
2024	"Heels on the Ground"	Shawn Desman	Non-album singles	Shawn Bosco Fernandes, Joel Stouffer, Evan Miles, Madison Nadurata
2024	"Toss Up"	Priyanka	Devastatia	Priyanka, Josh Cumbee
2024	"Ready for Myself"	Nelly Furtado	7	Nelly Furtado, Dominic Matheson
2025	"MARRIAGE"	Nelly Furtado	Non-album singles	Nelly Furtado, Ryan Gray Hawken
