= Falling in Love Again =

Falling in Love Again may refer to:

== Film ==
- Falling in Love Again (1980 film), a romantic comedy starring Elliott Gould
- Falling in Love Again (2003 film), a Canadian animated short

== Music ==
=== Albums ===
- Falling in Love Again (David Gates album), 1980
- Falling in Love Again (Davitt Sigerson album), 1984

=== Songs ===
- "Falling in Love Again" (Anika Moa song), 2002
- "Falling in Love Again" (Eagle-Eye Cherry song), 1998
- "Falling in Love Again" (Marvin Gaye song), 1977
- "Falling in Love Again (Can't Help It)", composed by Frederick Hollander and Sammy Lerner, 1930
- "Falling in Love Again", by Ted Mulry
- "Falling in Love Again", by Anjulie
- "Falling in Love Again", by Celine Dion from Courage

== See also ==
- Falling in love (disambiguation)
