= Dust in Gravity =

Song by Delerium

Single by Delerium featuring Kreesha Turner

from the album Remixed: The Definitive Collection
- Released: March 2, 2010
- Genre: Dance, pop
- Length: 3:59
- Label: Nettwerk
- Songwriter(s): Rhys Fulber, Michael Anthony James, Stef Lang, Troy Samson, Kreesha Turner, Bill Leeb

Delerium singles chronology
"Silence 2008" (2008)	"Dust in Gravity" (2010)	"Monarch" (2012)

Kreesha Turner singles chronology
"Passion" (2009)	"Dust in Gravity" (2010)	"Rock Paper Scissors" (2011)

"Dust in Gravity is a song by Canadian new age band Delerium featuring vocals by Canadian/Jamaican singer Kreesha Turner. It's the first and only single of their remix album "Remixed: The Definitive Collection". The song premiered on Delerium's official SoundCloud channel on November 9, 2009. The iTunes single was released later in the month, but the track was not officially sent to radio until March 2, 2010, on the same day as the iTunes remix EP was released.

Remixes were made by Groove Police, Sultan & Ned Shepard, Nervo, Niels van Gogh vs. Dave Ramone and Streets Of Fandango. An acoustic version of the single appeared on Voice (An Acoustic Collection).

== Music video ==
The music video premiered on December 8, 2009, on Delerium's official label's YouTube channel. The video featuring a dishevelled looking Turner walking around a town, watching peoples' problems as strange shapes appear in the sky. Later, she appears in her self-called 'goddess look', as the characters problems each resolve. As the shapes over-take the sky, the screen pans in on Turner, and then fades to black.

== Track listing ==
Digital Release - 2009

1. "Dust in Gravity (Radio Edit)" - 3:34
2. "Dust in Gravity (Album Version)" - 3:59

CD Promo - 2010

1. "Dust in Gravity (Radio Edit)" - 3:34
2. "Dust in Gravity (Groove Police Remix)" - 6:43
3. "Dust in Gravity (Groove Police Dub Remix)" - 6:06
4. "Dust in Gravity (Sultan & Ned Shepard Remix)" - 7:47
5. "Dust in Gravity (Sultan & Ned Shepard Dub Remix)" - 7:30
6. "Dust in Gravity (Nervo Remix)" - 6:35
7. "Dust in Gravity (Nervo Dub Remix)" - 6:06
8. "Dust in Gravity (Niels Van Gogh Vs. Dave Ramone Remix)" - 6:22
9. "Dust in Gravity (Streets Of Fandango Remix)" - 5:45
10. "Dust in Gravity (Album Version)" - 3:59

Digital Release Remixes - 2010

1. "Dust in Gravity (Groove Police Radio Edit)" - 3:24
2. "Dust in Gravity (Sultan & Ned Shepard Radio Edit)" - 4:02
3. "Dust in Gravity (Nervo Radio Edit)" - 3:35
4. "Dust in Gravity (Niels Van Gogh Vs. Dave Ramone Remix)" - 6:24
5. "Dust in Gravity (Groove Police Remix)" - 6:43
6. "Dust in Gravity (Sultan & Ned Shepard Remix)" - 7:47
7. "Dust in Gravity (Nervo Remix)" - 6:37
8. "Dust in Gravity (Streets Of Fandango Remix)" - 5:44

CD Maxi-single - 2010

1. "Dust in Gravity (Radio Edit)" - 3:34
2. "Dust in Gravity (Sultan & Ned Shepard Remix)" - 7:47
3. "Dust in Gravity (Groove Police Remix)" - 6:43
4. "Dust in Gravity (Nervo Remix)" - 6:37
5. "Dust in Gravity (Album Version)" - 3:59
6. "Dust in Gravity (Sultan & Ned Shepard Dub Remix)" - 7:31
7. "Dust in Gravity (Groove Police Dub Remix)" - 6:31
8. "Dust in Gravity (Nervo Dub Remix)" - 6:07
9. "Dust in Gravity (Streets Of Fandango Remix)" - 5:46
10. "Dust in Gravity (Sultan & Ned Shepard Radio Edit)" - 4:02
11. "Dust in Gravity (Groove Police Radio Edit)" - 3:23
12. "Dust in Gravity (Nervo Radio Edit)" - 3:34

== Charts ==
The song received much Canadian and American airplay, and charted at number one on the Billboard American Dance charts.

=== Weekly charts ===
Chart (2010)	Peak position
Canada Hot AC (Billboard)	49
US Dance Club Songs (Billboard)	1

=== Year-end charts ===
Chart (2010)	Position
US Dance Club Songs (Billboard)	12

== See also ==
- List of number-one dance singles of 2010 (U.S.)
