= Dancing with the Stars (American TV series) season 7 =

Dancing with the Stars
- Season 7
- Promotional poster, featuring former pro dancer Edyta Śliwińska
- Hosted by: Tom Bergeron; Samantha Harris
- Judges: Carrie Ann Inaba; Len Goodman; Bruno Tonioli
- Celebrity winner: Brooke Burke
- Professional winner: Derek Hough
- No. of episodes: 21

Release
- Original network: ABC
- Original release: September 22 – November 25, 2008

Season chronology
- ← Previous; Season 6 Next → Season 8

Season seven of Dancing with the Stars premiered on September 22, 2008, on the ABC network.

Instead of twelve couples as in previous seasons, this was the first season to feature a lineup of thirteen couples. This season also introduced four new dances: the hustle, jitterbug, salsa, and West Coast Swing.

Model and host Brooke Burke and Derek Hough were crowned the champions, while Tampa Bay Buccaneers defensive tackle Warren Sapp and Kym Johnson finished in second place, and NSYNC singer Lance Bass and Lacey Schwimmer finished third.

== Cast ==
=== Couples ===
This season featured thirteen celebrity contestants. The official cast announcement was made on the morning of August 25, 2008, on Good Morning America.

| Celebrity | Notability | Professional partner | Status |
|---|---|---|---|
| Jeffrey Ross | Stand-up comedian | Edyta Śliwińska | Eliminated 1st on September 23, 2008 |
| Ted McGinley | Film & television actor | Inna Brayer | Eliminated 2nd on September 24, 2008 |
| Kim Kardashian | Reality television personality | Mark Ballas | Eliminated 3rd on September 30, 2008 |
| Misty May-Treanor | Olympic beach volleyball player | Maksim Chmerkovskiy | Withdrew on October 6, 2008 |
| Rocco DiSpirito | Celebrity chef & author | Karina Smirnoff | Eliminated 4th on October 14, 2008 |
| Toni Braxton | Singer-songwriter | Alec Mazo | Eliminated 5th on October 21, 2008 |
| Cloris Leachman | Film & television actress | Corky Ballas | Eliminated 6th on October 28, 2008 |
| Susan Lucci | All My Children actress | Tony Dovolani | Eliminated 7th on November 5, 2008 |
| Maurice Greene | Olympic sprinter | Cheryl Burke | Eliminated 8th on November 11, 2008 |
| Cody Linley | Hannah Montana actor | Julianne Hough; Edyta Śliwińska (Weeks 7-8) | Eliminated 9th on November 18, 2008 |
| Lance Bass | NSYNC singer | Lacey Schwimmer | Third place on November 25, 2008 |
| Warren Sapp | NFL defensive tackle | Kym Johnson | Runners-up on November 25, 2008 |
| Brooke Burke | Model & television host | Derek Hough | Winners on November 25, 2008 |

=== Host and judges ===
Tom Bergeron and Samantha Harris returned as the show's co-hosts. Len Goodman, Bruno Tonioli, and Carrie Ann Inaba returned as the judges, while Michael Flatley appeared as a guest judge during week six.

== Scoring chart ==
The highest score each week is indicated in bold green with a dagger (†), while the lowest score each week is indicated in italicized red with a double-dagger (‡).

Color key:

Winners
Runners-up
Third place
Bottom two
Withdrew from competition
Eliminated

Dancing with the Stars (season 7) - Weekly scores
| Couple | Pl. | Week | | | | | | | | | | | | | |
| Couple | Pl. | 1 | | | 2 | 3 | 4 | 3+4 | 5 | 6 | 7 | 8 | 9 | 10 | |
| Couple | Pl. | Night 1 | Night 2 | 1+2 | 2 | 3 | 4 | 3+4 | 5 | 6 | 7 | 8 | 9 | Night 1 | Night 2 |
|---|---|---|---|---|---|---|---|---|---|---|---|---|---|---|---|
| Brooke & Derek | 1st | **23**† | **26**† | **49**† | **24**† | **28**† | **26**† | **54**† | **29**† | 26 | 30+29=**59**† | 28+27=**55**† | 21+28=49 | 28+30=**58**† | +30=**88**† (Note: This couple finished in first place.) |
| Warren & Kym | 2nd | 21 | 22 | 43 | **24**† | 25 | 22 | 47 | 25 | 25 | 21+29=50 | 28+26=54 | 24+25=49 | 25+28=53‡ | +27=80‡ (Note: This couple finished in second place.) |
| Lance & Lacey | 3rd | 22 | 21 | 43 | 20 | 22 | **26**† | 48 | 21‡ | **27**† | 25+20=45 | 26+24=50 | 28+29=**57**† | 26+27=53‡ | +28=81 (Note: This couple finished in third place.) |
| Cody & Julianne | 4th | 18 | 23 | 41 | 21 | 21 | 23 | 44 | 28 | 23 | 22+20=42‡ | 24+24=48‡ | 22+24=46‡ (Note: This couple was eliminated.) | | |
| Maurice & Cheryl | 5th | 18 | 21 | 39 | 19 | 24 | 20 | 44 | 27 | 21 | 25+29=54 | 24+24=48‡ | | | |
| Susan & Tony | 6th | 15 | 22 | 37 | 21 | 21 | 24 | 45 | 22 (Note: This couple was in the bottom two, but was not eliminated.) | 23 | 24+20=44 | | | | |
| Cloris & Corky | 7th | 16 | 16‡ | 32‡ | 15‡ | 16‡ | 22 | 38‡ | 21‡ | 15‡ | | | | | |
| Toni & Alec | 8th | 22 | 23 | 45 | 23 | 22 | 22 | 44 | 22 | | | | | | |
| Rocco & Karina | 9th | 14 | 21 | 35 | 16 | 20 | 18‡ | 38‡ | | | | | | | |
| Misty & Maks | 10th | 21 | 21 | 42 | 21 | (Note: This couple withdrew from the competition.) | | | | | | | | | |
| Kim & Mark | 11th | 19 | 18 | 37 | 17 | | | | | | | | | | |
| Ted & Inna | 12th | 18 | 19 | 37 | | | | | | | | | | | |
| Jeffrey & Edyta | 13th | 12‡ | | | | | | | | | | | | | |

== Weekly scores ==
Individual judges scores in charts below (given in parentheses) are listed in this order from left to right: Carrie Ann Inaba, Len Goodman, Bruno Tonioli.

=== Week 1 ===
On the first night, each couple performed either the cha-cha-cha or foxtrot. On the second night, each couple performed either the mambo or quickstep. Two couples were eliminated by the end of the second night. Couples are listed in the order they performed.

Night 1

| Couple | Scores | Dance | Music |
|---|---|---|---|
| Cody & Julianne | 18 (6, 6, 6) | Cha-cha-cha | "Tilt Ya Head Back" — Nelly & Christina Aguilera |
| Rocco & Karina | 14 (5, 4, 5) | Foxtrot | "Stray Cat Strut" — Stray Cats |
| Toni & Alec | 22 (7, 7, 8) | Cha-cha-cha | "Smooth" — Carlos Santana, feat. Rob Thomas |
| Maurice & Cheryl | 18 (6, 6, 6) | Foxtrot | "Doing It to Death" — Fred Wesley & The J.B.'s |
| Brooke & Derek | 23 (7, 8, 8) | Cha-cha-cha | "Are You My Woman? (Tell Me So)" — The Chi-Lites |
| Ted & Inna | 18 (6, 6, 6) | Foxtrot | "God Only Knows" — The Beach Boys |
| Lance & Lacey | 22 (8, 6, 8) | Cha-cha-cha | "Jumpin' Jack Flash" — The Rolling Stones |
| Cloris & Corky | 16 (6, 5, 5) | Foxtrot | "I Wish I Were in Love Again" — Frank Sinatra |
| Jeffrey & Edyta | 12 (4, 4, 4) | Cha-cha-cha | "Play That Funky Music" — Wild Cherry |
| Kim & Mark | 19 (6, 7, 6) | Foxtrot | "The Pink Panther Theme" — Henry Mancini |
| Susan & Tony | 15 (5, 5, 5) | Cha-cha-cha | "I Heard It Through the Grapevine" — Marvin Gaye |
| Misty & Maks | 21 (6, 8, 7) | Foxtrot | "This Will Be (An Everlasting Love)" — Natalie Cole |
| Warren & Kym | 21 (7, 7, 7) | Cha-cha-cha | "Do I Do" — Stevie Wonder |

Night 2

| Couple | Scores | Dance | Music | Result |
|---|---|---|---|---|
| Lance & Lacey | 21 (7, 6, 8) | Quickstep | "Close to Me" — The Cure | Safe |
| Misty & Maks | 21 (7, 7, 7) | Mambo | "Black Mambo"—Angel & the Mambokats | Safe |
| Maurice & Cheryl | 21 (7, 7, 7) | Mambo | "I Do the Jerk" — Ryan Shaw | Safe |
| Brooke & Derek | 26 (9, 8, 9) | Quickstep | "Lover, Come Back to Me" — Barbra Streisand | Safe |
| Cloris & Corky | 16 (6, 5, 5) | Mambo | "Coconut Woman" — Harry Belafonte | Safe |
| Toni & Alec | 23 (8, 7, 8) | Quickstep | "Blue Skies" — Della Reese | Safe |
| Warren & Kym | 22 (7, 7, 8) | Quickstep | "The Ding-Dong Daddy of the D-Car Line" — Cherry Poppin' Daddies | Safe |
| Ted & Inna | 19 (6, 6, 7) | Mambo | "Mambo Gozon" — Tito Puente | Eliminated |
| Cody & Julianne | 23 (8, 7, 8) | Quickstep | "I Want You To Want Me" — Letters to Cleo | Safe |
| Rocco & Karina | 21 (7, 7, 7) | Mambo | "La Comay" — Sonora Carruseles | Safe |
| Susan & Tony | 22 (7, 7, 8) | Quickstep | "Bei mir bist du schön" — The Arthur Murray Orchestra | Safe |
| Kim & Mark | 18 (6, 6, 6) | Mambo | "Baby Got Back" — Sir Mix-a-Lot | Safe |
| Jeffrey & Edyta | No scores received | Quickstep | "I Get a Kick Out of You" — Frank Sinatra | Eliminated |

=== Week 2 ===
Each couple performed either the paso doble or rumba. Couples are listed in the order they performed.

| Couple | Scores | Dance | Music | Result |
|---|---|---|---|---|
| Toni & Alec | 23 (7, 8, 8) | Rumba | "I Can't Make You Love Me" — Bonnie Raitt | Safe |
| Brooke & Derek | 24 (8, 8, 8) | Paso doble | "Palladio" — Karl Jenkins | Safe |
| Rocco & Karina | 16 (5, 6, 5) | Rumba | "You'll Never Find Another Love Like Mine" — Lou Rawls | Safe |
| Lance & Lacey | 20 (7, 6, 7) | Paso doble | "I Kissed a Girl" — Katy Perry | Safe |
| Kim & Mark | 17 (6, 6, 5) | Rumba | "You Give Me Something" — James Morrison | Eliminated |
| Misty & Maks | 21 (7, 7, 7) | Paso doble | "Take Me Out" — Franz Ferdinand | Safe |
| Maurice & Cheryl | 19 (7, 6, 6) | Rumba | "Mercy Mercy Me" — Marvin Gaye | Safe |
| Cloris & Corky | 15 (5, 5, 5) | Paso doble | "Boléro" — Maurice Ravel | Safe |
| Susan & Tony | 21 (7, 7, 7) | Rumba | "Waiting on the World to Change" — John Mayer | Safe |
| Warren & Kym | 24 (8, 8, 8) | Paso doble | "Malagueña" — The Brian Setzer Orchestra | Safe |
| Cody & Julianne | 21 (7, 7, 7) | Rumba | "Bleeding Love" — Leona Lewis | Safe |

=== Week 3 ===
Each couple performed either the jive or Viennese waltz. Couples are listed in the order they performed.

On October 3, Misty May-Treanor was injured during practice and received immediate medical attention. At the end of the episode that aired on Monday, October 6, she announced that she had ruptured her Achilles tendon, and thus had to withdraw from the competition. On the results show the next night, Tom Bergeron revealed that no one would be eliminated that week because of May-Treanor's withdrawal, and the week 3 scores would carry over to week 4. Rocco and Karina would have been eliminated had May-Treanor not withdrawn.

| Couple | Scores | Dance | Music |
|---|---|---|---|
| Susan & Tony | 21 (7, 7, 7) | Jive | "Why Do Fools Fall in Love" — Diana Ross |
| Lance & Lacey | 22 (8, 7, 7) | Viennese waltz | "Let Me Leave" — Marc Broussard |
| Maurice & Cheryl | 24 (8, 8, 8) | Jive | "Rock Around the Clock" — Bill Haley & His Comets |
| Rocco & Karina | 20 (7, 7, 6) | Viennese waltz | "What's New Pussycat?" — Tom Jones |
| Warren & Kym | 25 (9, 8, 8) | Viennese waltz | "Lovin' U" — Alicia Keys |
| Cody & Julianne | 21 (7, 7, 7) | Jive | "Call Me the Breeze" — Lynyrd Skynyrd |
| Toni & Alec | 22 (8, 7, 7) | Viennese waltz | "Für Elise" — Ludwig van Beethoven |
| Cloris & Corky | 16 (6, 5, 5) | Jive | "The Girl Can't Help It" — Little Richard |
| Brooke & Derek | 28 (9, 10, 9) | Viennese waltz | "Daughters" — John Mayer |

=== Week 4 ===
Each couple performed either the samba or tango. Couples are listed in the order they performed.

| Couple | Scores | Dance | Music | Result |
|---|---|---|---|---|
| Maurice & Cheryl | 20 (6, 7, 7) | Samba | "That's the Way (I Like It)" — KC and the Sunshine Band | Safe |
| Cody & Julianne | 23 (7, 8, 8) | Tango | "Bohemian Like You" — The Dandy Warhols | Safe |
| Toni & Alec | 22 (7, 7, 8) | Samba | "De dónde soy" — Thalía | Safe |
| Cloris & Corky | 22 (8, 7, 7) | Tango | "The Big Date" — Marc Shaiman | Bottom two |
| Rocco & Karina | 18 (6, 6, 6) | Samba | "I Go to Rio" — Peter Allen | Eliminated |
| Susan & Tony | 24 (8, 8, 8) | Tango | "La Bohemia" — Electric Club Tango | Safe |
| Brooke & Derek | 26 (9, 8, 9) | Samba | "Hip Hip Chin Chin" — Club des Belugas | Safe |
| Lance & Lacey | 26 (9, 8, 9) | Tango | "Disturbia" — Rihanna | Safe |
| Warren & Kym | 22 (8, 7, 7) | Samba | "Bounce With Me" — Kreesha Turner | Safe |

=== Week 5 ===
Each couple performed one of four dances newly introduced this season: the hustle, jitterbug, salsa, or West Coast Swing. Couples are listed in the order they performed.

On Sunday, October 19, Brooke Burke was injured during the camera blocking for her jitterbug with partner Derek Hough. She ended up going to the hospital on Monday, October 20, for treatment and x-rays. It was determined that she had severely bruised her foot, but as of Monday afternoon, an ABC spokesperson told People that Burke and Hough would still perform on that night's live show.

| Couple | Scores | Dance | Music | Result |
|---|---|---|---|---|
| Lance & Lacey | 21 (7, 7, 7) | West Coast Swing | "Breakin' Dishes" — Rihanna | Safe |
| Toni & Alec | 22 (7, 7, 8) | West Coast Swing | "The Way You Make Me Feel" — Michael Jackson | Eliminated |
| Susan & Tony | 22 (7, 7, 8) | Hustle | "Upside Down" — Diana Ross | Bottom two |
| Warren & Kym | 25 (8, 8, 9) | Hustle | "Funkytown" — Lipps Inc. | Safe |
| Cloris & Corky | 21 (7, 7, 7) | Salsa | "Tres Deseos" — Gloria Estefan | Safe |
| Maurice & Cheryl | 27 (9, 9, 9) | Salsa | "Everything I Can't Have" — Robin Thicke | Safe |
| Brooke & Derek | 29 (10, 9, 10) | Jitterbug | "Don't Be Cruel" — Elvis Presley | Safe |
| Cody & Julianne | 28 (10, 9, 9) | Jitterbug | "Big Time Operator" — Big Bad Voodoo Daddy | Safe |

=== Week 6 ===
Individual judges scores in charts below (given in parentheses) are listed in this order from left to right: Carrie Ann Inaba, Michael Flatley, Bruno Tonioli.

Each couple performed one unlearned dance, and participated in a group hip-hop dance. Couples are listed in the order they performed.

| Couple | Scores | Dance | Music | Result |
|---|---|---|---|---|
| Maurice & Cheryl | 21 (7, 7, 7) | Viennese waltz | "Gravity" — John Mayer | Safe |
| Lance & Lacey | 27 (9, 9, 9) | Jive | "Tutti Frutti" — Little Richard | Safe |
| Susan & Tony | 23 (8, 8, 7) | Mambo | "Si Señor!..." — Gloria Estefan | Safe |
| Brooke & Derek | 26 (8, 10, 8) | Rumba | "No Air" — Jordin Sparks & Chris Brown | Safe |
| Cloris & Corky | 15 (5, 5, 5) | Cha-cha-cha | "Come See About Me" — The Supremes | Eliminated |
| Cody & Julianne | 23 (8, 8, 7) | Samba | "Whine Up" — Kat DeLuna, feat. Elephant Man | Safe |
| Warren & Kym | 25 (8, 9, 8) | Rumba | "Irreplaceable" — Beyoncé | Safe |
| Brooke & Derek Cloris & Corky Cody & Julianne Lance & Lacey Maurice & Cheryl Susan & Tony Warren & Kym | No scores received | Group; Hip-hop | "It Takes Two" — Rob Base & DJ E-Z Rock | |

=== Week 7 ===
Each couple performed one unlearned dance and one team dance. Couples are listed in the order they performed.

Approximately forty minutes after the October 21 results show, Julianne Hough was taken by ambulance to the hospital for increasingly painful stomach pains. Initially, Hough said she was taking a day off from the group rehearsal to recover. However, on October 27, she was diagnosed with endometriosis, had to undergo surgery to remove her appendix on October 28, and that she would miss the competition until she recovered. As a result, her celebrity partner, Cody Linley, was paired with Edyta Śliwińska for weeks 7 and 8 of the competition.

On October 30, Lacey Schwimmer reported that she had endometriosis as well. It came after Julianne Hough's experience with the common, but painful, condition allowed Schwimmer to notice similar symptoms and be diagnosed at an early stage, enabling it to be treated without surgery or time away from the show.

| Couple | Scores | Dance | Music | Result |
|---|---|---|---|---|
| Warren & Kym | 21 (7, 7, 7) | Foxtrot | "Is You Is or Is You Ain't My Baby" — Diana Krall | Safe |
| Susan & Tony | 24 (8, 8, 8) | Paso doble | "The Ride" — James Horner | Eliminated |
| Maurice & Cheryl | 25 (8, 9, 8) | Cha-cha-cha | "Cupid Shuffle" — Cupid | Safe |
| Cody & Edyta | 22 (8, 7, 7) | Viennese waltz | "Have You Ever Really Loved a Woman?" — Bryan Adams | Safe |
| Lance & Lacey | 25 (9, 7, 9) | Rumba | "Your Body Is a Wonderland" — John Mayer | Safe |
| Brooke & Derek | 30 (10, 10, 10) | Foxtrot | "Lullaby of Birdland" — Sarah Vaughan | Safe |
| Cody & Edyta Lance & Lacey Susan & Tony | 20 (6, 7, 7) | Team; Cha-cha-cha | "Mercy" — Duffy | |
| Brooke & Derek Maurice & Cheryl Warren & Kym | 29 (10, 9, 10) | Team; Paso doble | "Rocks" — Primal Scream | |

=== Week 8 ===
Each couple performed two unlearned dances. Couples are listed in the order they performed.

| Couple | Scores | Dance | Music | Result |
|---|---|---|---|---|
| Cody & Edyta | 24 (8, 8, 8) | Foxtrot | "Call Me Irresponsible" — Frank Sinatra | Safe |
| Cody & Edyta | 24 (8, 8, 8) | Mambo | "My Way" — Los Lonely Boys | Safe |
| Brooke & Derek | 28 (10, 8, 10) | Tango | "Tango Diabolo" — Christa Behnke | Safe |
| Brooke & Derek | 27 (9, 9, 9) | Mambo | "Cuban Mambo" — Xavier Cugat | Safe |
| Maurice & Cheryl | 24 (8, 8, 8) | Quickstep | "Puttin' on the Ritz" — Fred Astaire | Eliminated |
| Maurice & Cheryl | 24 (8, 8, 8) | Paso doble | "Let It Rock" — Kevin Rudolf & Lil Wayne | Eliminated |
| Lance & Lacey | 26 (9, 8, 9) | Foxtrot | "Sweet Pea" — Amos Lee | Safe |
| Lance & Lacey | 24 (8, 7, 9) | Samba | "1 Thing" — Amerie | Safe |
| Warren & Kym | 28 (10, 9, 9) | Tango | "Peter Gunn Theme" — Henry Mancini | Safe |
| Warren & Kym | 26 (9, 8, 9) | Jive | "Hallelujah I Love Her So" — Ray Charles | Safe |

=== Week 9 ===
Each couple performed two unlearned dances. Couples are listed in the order they performed.

Julianne Hough returned to the competition after missing the previous two weeks.

| Couple | Scores | Dance | Music | Result |
|---|---|---|---|---|
| Brooke & Derek | 21 (7, 7, 7) | Jive | "The House Is Rockin'" — Stevie Ray Vaughan | Safe |
| Brooke & Derek | 28 (9, 10, 9) | Salsa | "Babarabatiri" — Tito Puente | Safe |
| Cody & Julianne | 22 (8, 7, 7) | Paso doble | "Le Disko" — Shiny Toy Guns | Eliminated |
| Cody & Julianne | 24 (8, 8, 8) | Salsa | "Juventud de Presente" — Tito Puente | Eliminated |
| Warren & Kym | 24 (8, 8, 8) | Mambo | "Tequila" — The Champs | Safe |
| Warren & Kym | 25 (9, 8, 8) | Jitterbug | "That Old Black Magic" — Sammy Davis Jr. | Safe |
| Lance & Lacey | 28 (10, 9, 9) | Mambo | "Straight To Number One" — Touch and Go | Safe |
| Lance & Lacey | 29 (10, 9, 10) | Jitterbug | "Jim Dandy" — Black Oak Arkansas | Safe |

=== Week 10 ===
On the first night, all three couples faced off in a group samba, where they received individual scores from the judges, and performed their freestyle routines. On the second night, each couple performed their favorite routine from the season. Couples are listed in the order they performed.

Night 1

| Couple | Scores | Dance | Music |
|---|---|---|---|
| Brooke & Derek | 28 (9, 9, 10) | Group; Samba | "Blame It on the Boogie" — The Jacksons |
| Lance & Lacey | 26 (9, 8, 9) | Group; Samba | "Blame It on the Boogie" — The Jacksons |
| Warren & Kym | 25 (9, 7, 9) | Group; Samba | "Blame It on the Boogie" — The Jacksons |
| Brooke & Derek | 30 (10, 10, 10) | Freestyle | "You're the One That I Want" — John Travolta & Olivia Newton-John |
| Lance & Lacey | 27 (9, 9, 9) | Freestyle | "It's Tricky" — Run-D.M.C. |
| Warren & Kym | 28 (9, 10, 9) | Freestyle | "Proud Mary" — Ike & Tina Turner |

Night 2

| Couple | Scores | Dance | Music | Result |
|---|---|---|---|---|
| Warren & Kym | 27 (9, 9, 9) | Hustle | "Funkytown" — Lipps Inc. | Runners-up |
| Lance & Lacey | 28 (9, 9, 10) | Jitterbug | "Jim Dandy" — Black Oak Arkansas | Third place |
| Brooke & Derek | 30 (10, 10, 10) | Viennese waltz | "Daughters" — John Mayer | Winners |

== Dance chart ==
The couples performed the following each week:

- Week 1 (Night 1): One unlearned dance (cha-cha-cha or foxtrot)
- Week 1 (Night 2): One unlearned dance (mambo or quickstep)
- Week 2: One unlearned dance (paso doble or rumba)
- Week 3: One unlearned dance (jive or Viennese waltz)
- Week 4: One unlearned dance (samba or tango)
- Week 5: One unlearned dance (hustle, jitterbug, salsa, or West Coast Swing)
- Week 6: One unlearned dance & hip-hop group dance
- Week 7: One unlearned dance & team dance
- Week 8: Two unlearned dances
- Week 9: Two unlearned dances
- Week 10 (Night 1): Group samba & freestyle
- Week 10 (Night 2): Favorite dance of the season

Color key:

No scores received

Dancing with the Stars (season 7) - Dance chart
| Couple | Week | | | | | | | | | | | | | | | | |
| Couple | 1 | | 2 | 3 | 4 | 5 | 6 | | 7 | | 8 | | 9 | | 10 | | |
| Couple | Night 1 | Night 2 | 2 | 3 | 4 | 5 | 6 | | 7 | | 8 | | 9 | | Night 1 | | Night 2 |
|---|---|---|---|---|---|---|---|---|---|---|---|---|---|---|---|---|---|
| Brooke & Derek | Cha-cha-cha | Quickstep | Paso doble | Viennese waltz | Samba | Jitterbug | Rumba | Group; Hip-hop (Note: No scores were received for this dance.) | Foxtrot | Team; Paso doble | Tango | Mambo | Jive | Salsa | Group; Samba | Freestyle | Viennese waltz |
| Warren & Kym | Cha-cha-cha | Quickstep | Paso doble | Viennese waltz | Samba | Hustle | Rumba | Group; Hip-hop | Foxtrot | Team; Paso doble | Tango | Jive | Mambo | Jitterbug | Group; Samba | Freestyle | Hustle |
| Lance & Lacey | Cha-cha-cha | Quickstep | Paso doble | Viennese waltz | Tango | West Coast Swing | Jive | Group; Hip-hop | Rumba | Team; Cha-cha-cha | Foxtrot | Samba | Mambo | Jitterbug | Group; Samba | Freestyle | Jitterbug |
| Cody & Julianne | Cha-cha-cha | Quickstep | Rumba | Jive | Tango | Jitterbug | Samba | Group; Hip-hop | Viennese waltz | Team; Cha-cha-cha | Foxtrot | Mambo | Paso doble | Salsa | | | |
| Maurice & Cheryl | Foxtrot | Mambo | Rumba | Jive | Samba | Salsa | Viennese waltz | Group; Hip-hop | Cha-cha-cha | Team; Paso doble | Quickstep | Paso doble | | | | | |
| Susan & Tony | Cha-cha-cha | Quickstep | Rumba | Jive | Tango | Hustle | Mambo | Group; Hip-hop | Paso doble | Team; Cha-cha-cha | | | | | | | |
| Cloris & Corky | Foxtrot | Mambo | Paso doble | Jive | Tango | Salsa | Cha-cha-cha | Group; Hip-hop | | | | | | | | | |
| Toni & Alec | Cha-cha-cha | Quickstep | Rumba | Viennese waltz | Samba | West Coast Swing | | | | | | | | | | | |
| Rocco & Karina | Foxtrot | Mambo | Rumba | Viennese waltz | Samba | | | | | | | | | | | | |
| Misty & Maksim | Foxtrot | Mambo | Paso doble | | | | | | | | | | | | | | |
| Kim & Mark | Foxtrot | Mambo | Rumba | | | | | | | | | | | | | | |
| Ted & Inna | Foxtrot | Mambo | | | | | | | | | | | | | | | |
| Jeffrey & Edyta | Cha-cha-cha | Quickstep | | | | | | | | | | | | | | | |

== Ratings ==
Viewership and ratings per episode of Dancing with the Stars (American TV series) season 7
| No. | Title | Air date | Timeslot (ET) | Rating/share (18–49) | Viewers (millions) |
|---|---|---|---|---|---|
| 1 | "Episode 701" | September 22, 2008 | Monday 8:00 p.m. | 5.3/13 | 21.34 |
| 2 | "Episode 701A" | September 23, 2008 | Tuesday 9:00 p.m. | 4.7/12 | 18.30 |
| 3 | "Episode 701B" | September 24, 2008 | Wednesday 8:00 p.m. | 3.6/10 | 15.87 |
| 4 | "Episode 702" | September 29, 2008 | Monday 8:00 p.m. | 4.4/11 | 18.88 |
| 5 | "Episode 702A" | September 30, 2008 | Tuesday 9:00 p.m. | 3.7/9 | 15.49 |
| 6 | "Episode 703" | October 6, 2008 | Monday 8:00 p.m. | 4.3/11 | 18.59 |
| 7 | "Episode 703A" | October 7, 2008 | Tuesday 8:00 p.m. | 3.6/10 | 15.05 |
| 8 | "Episode 704" | October 13, 2008 | Monday 8:00 p.m. | 4.0/11 | 17.76 |
| 9 | "Episode 704A" | October 14, 2008 | Tuesday 9:00 p.m. | 3.3/8 | 14.82 |
| 10 | "Episode 705" | October 20, 2008 | Monday 8:00 p.m. | 4.1/10 | 18.50 |
| 11 | "Episode 705A" | October 21, 2008 | Tuesday 9:00 p.m. | 3.8/10 | 16.35 |
| 12 | "Episode 706" | October 27, 2008 | Monday 8:00 p.m. | 4.2/10 | 18.88 |
| 13 | "Episode 706A" | October 28, 2008 | Tuesday 9:00 p.m. | 3.9/9 | 17.44 |
| 14 | "Episode 707" | November 3, 2008 | Monday 8:00 p.m. | 3.9/9 | 17.09 |
| 15 | "Episode 707A" | November 5, 2008 | Wednesday 8:00 p.m. | 3.3/9 | 15.85 |
| 16 | "Episode 708" | November 10, 2008 | Monday 8:00 p.m. | 4.2/10 | 18.69 |
| 17 | "Episode 708A" | November 11, 2008 | Tuesday 9:00 p.m. | 3.6/9 | 16.52 |
| 18 | "Episode 709" | November 17, 2008 | Monday 8:00 p.m. | —N/a | 19.63 |
| 19 | "Episode 709A" | November 18, 2008 | Tuesday 9:00 p.m. | —N/a | 17.59 |
| 20 | "Episode 710" | November 24, 2008 | Monday 8:00 p.m. | 4.7/12 | 21.09 |
| 21 | "Episode 710A" | November 25, 2008 | Tuesday 9:00 p.m. | 5.1/13 | 20.65 |
