= Voice (An Acoustic Collection) =

Compilation album by Delerium
- Released: 26 October 2010
- Genre: Electronic
- Label: Nettwerk
- Producer: Delerium

Delerium chronology
Remixed: The Definitive Collection (2010)	Voice (An Acoustic Collection) (2010)	Music Box Opera (2012)

Voice (An Acoustic Collection) is a 2010 acoustic album from Delerium's past singles and tracks from previous albums.

The album also includes three new tracks: "Send Me an Angel", "Too Late, Farewell" and "Vienna".

"Voice" was also released as a five-track EP included for free and exclusively with the Sonic Seducer magazine issue 10 of 2010 in Germany.

== Track listing ==
1. "Send Me an Angel" featuring Miranda Lee Richards - 3:51
2. "Dust in Gravity (Acoustic)" featuring Kreesha Turner - 4:01
3. "Too Late, Farewell" featuring Butterfly Boucher - 3:56
4. "Silence (Acoustic)" featuring Sarah McLachlan - 5:00
5. "Innocente (Acoustic)" featuring Leigh Nash – 6:07
6. "Vienna" featuring Elsiane - 5:07
7. "Lost and Found (Acoustic)" featuring Jaël - 3:43
8. "Flowers Become Screens (Acoustic)" featuring Kristy Thirsk - 5:58
9. "Love (Acoustic)" featuring Zoë Johnston - 3:35
10. "After All (Acoustic)" featuring Jaël - 3:48
11. "Orbit of Me (Acoustic)" featuring Leigh Nash - 4:26
12. "Touched (Acoustic)" featuring Rachel Fuller - 4:06

EP - 2010

1. "Send Me an Angel" featuring Miranda Lee Richards - 3:51
2. "After All (Acoustic)" featuring Jaël - 3:48
3. "Flowers Become Screens (Acoustic)" featuring Kristy Thirsk - 5:58
4. "Innocente (Acoustic)" featuring Leigh Nash – 6:07
5. "Love (Acoustic)" featuring Zoë Johnston - 3:35
