= You Again =

2010 film by Andy Fickman

- Theatrical release poster
- Directed by: Andy Fickman
- Written by: Moe Jelline
- Produced by: Andy Fickman; John J. Strauss; Eric Tannenbaum
- Starring: Kristen Bell; Sigourney Weaver; Jamie Lee Curtis; Odette Yustman; Kristin Chenoweth; Victor Garber; Betty White
- Cinematography: David Hennings
- Edited by: David Rennie
- Music by: Nathan Wang
- Production companies: Touchstone Pictures; Frontier Pictures; The Tannenbaum Company
- Distributed by: Walt Disney Studios Motion Pictures
- Release date: September 24, 2010
- Running time: 105 minutes
- Country: United States
- Language: English
- Budget: $20 million
- Box office: $32.1 million

You Again is a 2010 American comedy film directed by Andy Fickman and written by Moe Jelline. The film stars Kristen Bell, Jamie Lee Curtis, Sigourney Weaver, Odette Yustman, James Wolk, Victor Garber, Billy Unger, Kyle Bornheimer, Kristin Chenoweth, and Betty White in her final live-action film acting role before her death in 2021.

Released on September 24, 2010, by Touchstone Pictures, the film was panned by critics, and was a commercial disappointment, having earned $32.1 million against a production budget of $20 million. It was the last solo Touchstone Pictures project before working on subsequent films in association with Miramax, DreamWorks, South African films, Studio Ghibli and Lucasfilm. As a result of this, Touchstone signed a deal with DreamWorks Pictures in 2011, starting with I Am Number Four.

== Plot ==
In 2002 in the fictional town of Ridgefield, California, awkward teenager Marni Olsen is bullied by popular girl JJ. Marni's protective brother, basketball star Will, is oblivious to JJ's behavior, even when JJ sabotages the team's crucial win by pushing the mascot-clad Marni into him.

Eight years later, Marni is a successful public relations executive in Los Angeles, and has been recently promoted to her firm's New York City office. She returns home for Will's upcoming wedding to a woman named Joanna, whom she has never met, and later learns is JJ. To Marni's chagrin, her family adores Joanna, who appears to not remember her. Marni and Will's mother Gail also discovers that Joanna's beloved aunt Ramona, a wealthy businesswoman paying for the wedding, is her former high school best friend.

Marni refrains from telling Will about Joanna's past. A series of mishaps have Marni resembling her high school self, further distressing her. Marni realizes that Joanna does remember her when Joanna deliberately plays the song she used to torment Marnie with in high school. Resolving to save Will from Joanna, Marni retrieves a video from the time capsule she buried during senior year, which displays Joanna's hostile behavior toward her and other students. Meanwhile, Gail and Ramona reconcile, though Ramona still seems unhappy with her.

At the bridal shower, Marni privately confronts Joanna. Joanna finally admits she remembers her, but neglects to apologize, instead cautioning Marni to not interfere with her and Will's relationship. Now more determined than ever to protect Will, Marni invites Joanna's ex-boyfriend Tim as her date to the rehearsal dinner. During toasts, Tim embarrasses Joanna by announcing that she left him at the altar on their wedding day. The time capsule video is then played, shocking and confusing all the guests, especially Will, who leaves.

Marni insists Joanna hasn't changed, though Joanna remorsefully claims she had pretended to forget Marni so they could start over. The two fight until Will intervenes, scolding them both before storming out and calling off the wedding. Ramona then calls Gail out for overshadowing her in high school and stealing her crush, Richie Phillips. During their argument, they fall into the pool, but ultimately reconcile. Gail's husband and Marni's father, Mark, grounds both Marni and Gail.

That night, Marni finds Joanna tearfully binge eating in her wedding dress. Joanna finally apologizes for bullying Marni, insisting that she changed after her parents died as she hoped to become someone they could be proud of, and explaining that she pretended not to know Marni because she feared her past would cost her Will and his family. Marni forgives her, promising to mend Joanna's relationship with Will. Marni later apologizes to Will, insisting she was only trying to protect him.

Joanna and Will reconcile in the family's old tree house, but because their younger brother Ben had loosened the screws, it collapses, injuring them and forcing a hospital stay which delays the wedding. However, Marni arranges a wedding at the hospital. Gail surprises Ramona with Richie, and they start a relationship while Marni starts one with Charlie, her brother's best friend.

Joanna reintroduces her grandmother, Bunny, to Bunny's high school rival, Helen. Bunny finally gets revenge by stealing Helen's dance partner, while Helen swears that the game is not yet over.

== Cast ==
- Kristen Bell as Marni Olivia Olsen, a successful public relations executive in Los Angeles
- Jamie Lee Curtis as Gail Byer Olsen, Marni's mother
  - Brittany Wilkinson as teenage Gail
- Sigourney Weaver as Ramona "Aunt Mona" Clark, a wealthy businesswoman and Joanna's aunt
  - Anne Winfree as teenage Ramona
- Odette Yustman as Joanna "J.J." Clark, a girl who bullied Marni when they were young and has now married her brother and Ramona's niece
- Kristin Chenoweth as Georgia King, a wedding planner
- Victor Garber as Mark Olsen, Gail's husband and Marni's father
- Jimmy Wolk as William "Will" Olsen, Gail's son and Marni's protective older brother
- Betty White as Grandma Bunny Byer, Gail's mother and Marni's maternal grandmother
- Patrick Duffy as Ritchie Phillips
- Kyle Bornheimer as Tim
- Sean Wing as Charlie Mason, Will's friend and the one who was nice to Marni in high school
- Billy Unger as Ben Olsen, Gail's son and Marni's younger brother
- Christine Lakin as Taylor
- Reginald VelJohnson as Mason Dunlevy
- Cloris Leachman as Helen Sullivan (uncredited cameo)
- Dwayne Johnson as Air Marshal (uncredited cameo)
- Meagan Holder as Kendall
- Jenna Leigh Green as Heather
- Staci Keanan as Dana
- Catherine Bach as Daisy
- Daryl Hall as himself
- John Oates as himself

== Music ==
- "We Are the Champions" – Performed by Queen
- "Barracuda" – Performed by Heart
- "I'll Go On" – Performed by Brittany Burton
- "Kiss on My List" – Performed by Hall & Oates
- "Full of U" – Performed by Shaun Ruymen
- "Pump It" – Performed by The Black Eyed Peas
- "Bounce with Me" – Performed by Kreesha Turner
- "Kiss Me" – Performed by Sixpence None the Richer
- "Toxic" – Performed by Britney Spears
- "What Is Love" – Written and Performed by Jackie Tohn
- "Magic of Maui" – Written and Performed by Charles Brotman and Elmer Lim Jr.
- "By the Time You Forget" – Written and Performed by Andy Suzuki
- "Paris Without You" – Performed by Perry Danos
- "Dinner 4 Deux" – Written and Performed by Charles Blaker and Kevin Hiatt
- "Jump" – Performed by Ali Dee and the Deekompressors
- "Every Woman in the World" – Written by Dominic Bugatti and Frank Musker
- "We Are Family" – Performed by Sister Sledge
- "Who's Sorry Now?" – Performed by Connie Francis

== Production ==
You Again was completed on April 3, 2010. The rivalry between the two grandmothers, Betty White and Cloris Leachman, is a reference to the conflict between the two on The Mary Tyler Moore Show. Three of the cast members from the sitcom Step by Step (Patrick Duffy, Staci Keanan, and Christine Lakin) appeared in the movie in a "mini-reunion".

== Reception ==
=== Critical response ===
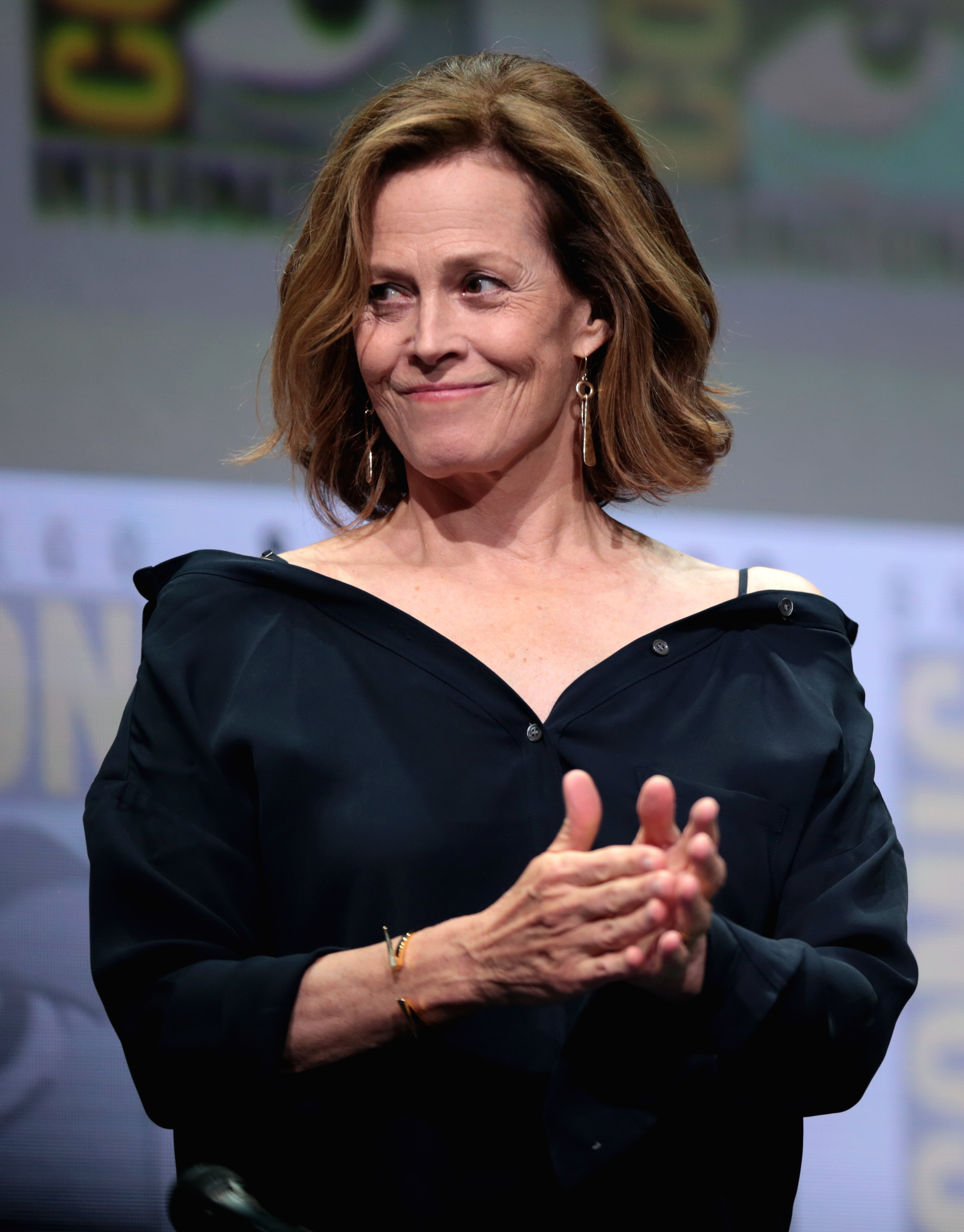
Sigourney Weaver was praised by critics for her performance.

Rotten Tomatoes gives You Again an approval rating of 20% based on reviews from 92 critics, with an average score of 4.00/10. The critical consensus reads: "You Again represents a rare opportunity to see some of Hollywood's finest female veterans together onscreen – and, unfortunately, wastes their talents almost completely." On Metacritic, it had a weighted average score of 28 out of 100, based on 25 critics, indicating "generally unfavorable reviews". Audiences polled by CinemaScore gave the film an average grade of "B+" on an A+ to F scale.

Jamie Lee Curtis and Kristen Bell were praised for their roles. The New York Times critic Stephen Holden wrote that "There is not a laugh to be found in this rancid, misogynistic revenge comedy," declaring "Like so many Disney movies, 'You Again' exalts shallow, materialistic values, then tries to camouflage its essentially poisonous content with several layers of sugar coating and weepy reconciliation." Richard Roeper gave the film an F and stated that it was one of the worst movies he had ever seen. Among the more favorable reviews was Lana Berkowitz of The San Francisco Chronicle, who wrote that she enjoyed the mix of slapstick, musical numbers and surprise cameo appearances. Bill Goodykoontz of The Arizona Republic praised the cast for taking "a by-the-numbers comedy" and making it better than it has any right to be.

=== Box office ===
The film opened at the box office at No. 5 with $8,407,513 and would go on to gross a domestic total of $25,702,053; with an international gross of $6,303,195, You Again grossed $32,005,248 worldwide; against a $20 million production budget.

== Accolades ==
Award	Category	Nominee(s)	Result
Women Film Critics Circle Awards 2010	Hall of Shame "For perpetuation of the same-old same-old stereotypes of hysterical insecure women and reasonable, sage men."		Won
Young Artist Awards 2011	Best Performance in a Feature Film - Supporting Young Actor	Billy Unger	Won

== Home media ==
The film was released by Touchstone Home Entertainment in a two-disc Blu-ray and DVD combo pack on February 8, 2011. Bonus features include deleted scenes, bloopers, and a question-and-answer (Q&A) feature entitled Ask the Cast.
