= Tropic Electric =

Studio album by Kreesha Turner
- Released: November 15, 2011
- Recorded: 2009–2011
- Genre: R&B, pop, dance
- Label: EMI/Capitol

Kreesha Turner chronology
Passion (2008)	Tropic Electric (2011)	Evolution Inevitable (2013)

Singles from Tropic Electric
- 1. "Rock Paper Scissors" Released: July 5, 2011; 2. "I Could Stay" Released: October 24, 2011; 3. "Love Again" Released: April 10, 2012

Tropic Electric is the second studio album by the Canadian/Jamaican singer Kreesha Turner. It was released on November 15, 2011, digitally and physically. Turner decided to release it as a double disc, one side Tropic, and the other 'Electric'. The 'Tropic' side was recorded in Jamaica, to capture a new type of genre, a mix of reggae and pop music. The 'Electric' side of the album is dedicated to fans who enjoyed the vibe on her previous album, Passion.

The album received mostly positive reviews, praising its Jamaican sound, but criticizing tracks 'I Feel My Darling', and 'Come My Way'.

The iTunes track listing was mislabeled, the track reading 'Killer In The Club' is actually '8 A.M.', and vice versa.

== Singles ==
The first single from the album, "Rock Paper Scissors", was released on July 5, 2011. For unknown reasons, only the radio edit of the track appears on the album.

The second single, "I Could Stay", was released on October 24, 2011. The iTunes single only contains the radio edit, but the full version of the song can be heard on the album. The song peaked at 59 on the Canadian Hot 100. "I Could Stay" was noted by critics for referencing and sounding similar to Janet Jackson's "Runaway". On Sunday, February 5, 2012, Turner confirmed through her Mobile Backstage iPhone app that she had just finished shooting the music video for the third single off the album in Montreal. The third and last single on the album was the second track on the electric side of the album, the Shawn Desman produced 'Love Again'.

== Track listing ==
Standard Edition
No.	Title	Writer(s)	Length
1.	"Rock Paper Scissors (Radio Edit)"	Kreesha Turner, Courtney John, Nastassja Hammond & Leonardo McFarlane	2:54
2.	"I Feel My Darling (featuring Courtney John)"	Kreesha Turner, Courtney John, Nastassja Hammond & Leonardo McFarlane	3:24
3.	"My Kryptonite"	Kreesha Turner, Nastassja Hammond & Leonardo McFarlane	3:06
4.	"Don't Leave Me Now"	Kreesha Turner, Nastassja Hammond & Leonardo McFarlane	3:41
5.	"Come My Way"	Kreesha Turner & Nastassja Hammond	3:28
6.	"I Could Stay"	Kreesha Turner, Erika Nuri & Greg Ogan	3:26
7.	"Love Again"	Kreesha Turner, Jon Levine & Shawn Desman	3:50
8.	"Away from You"	Kreesha Turner, Phil Tan & Dean Coleman	3:05
9.	"Wherever You Are"	Kreesha Turner, Nastassja Hammond & Brandon Green	2:58
10.	"Killer In The Club"	Kreesha Turner, Nastassja Hammond, Mike James & Troy Samson	3:43

iTunes Bonus Tracks
No.	Title	Writer(s)	Length
11.	"8 A.M."	Kreesha Turner, Nastassja Hammond & Leontre Roberts	2:27
12.	"Away from You (Extended Mix)"	Kreesha Turner, Phil Tan & Dean Coleman	6:02
13.	"Killer In the Club (Heratix Remix)"	Kreesha Turner, Troy Samson, Mike James & Nastassja Hammond	3:30
14.	"Rock Paper Scissors (Music Video)"	Kreesha Turner, Courtney John, Nastassja Hammond & Leonardo McFarlane	3:26
