= Love Again (Kreesha Turner song) =

Single by Kreesha Turner

from the album Tropic Electric
- Released: April 10, 2012 (Canada)
- Genre: Dance-pop, R&B
- Length: 3:24 (Radio Edit) 3:50 (Album Version)
- Label: EMI/Capitol
- Songwriter(s): Kreesha Turner, Jon Levine & Shawn Desman
- Producer(s): Shawn Desman

Kreesha Turner singles chronology
"I Could Stay" (2011)	"Love Again" (2012)	"Keep Running the Melody" (2012)

"Love Again" is the third single from Canadian/Jamaican singer Kreesha Turner's second album, Tropic Electric. The song was written by Turner, Jon Levine, and Shawn Desman, who also produced the track. The song was sent to radios in early April, and was put on iTunes for digital download on April 10, 2012. The song was announced as a single in early February, by Turner, through her Backstage Pass iPhone application. The single artwork for the song is a picture from Turner's photo shoot for Eckō Unltd.

== French version ==
Along with the release, a French version of the song, titled 'Donne-Moi Ton Amour', was recorded, and uploaded to YouTube. The track later was released on iTunes the same day as the radio edit of the song.

== Music video ==
A music video for the song was released Tuesday, May 1, 2012, on Turner's official VEVO channel.

== Charts ==
Chart (2012)	Peak position
Canadian Hot 100	86

== Track listing ==
=== Radio edit ===
No.	Title	Writer(s)	Length
1.	"Love Again (Radio Edit)"	Kreesha Turner, Jon Levine & Shawn Desman	3:24

=== French version ===
No.	Title	Writer(s)	Length
1.	"Donne-Moi Ton Amour"	Kreesha Turner, Jon Levine & Shawn Desman	3:50
