= I Could Stay =

Single by Kreesha Turner

from the album Tropic Electric
- Released: October 24, 2011 (Canada)
- Genre: Dance-pop, R&B
- Length: 3:26
- Label: EMI/Capitol
- Songwriter(s): Kreesha Turner, Erika Nuri & Greg Ogan

Kreesha Turner singles chronology
"Rock Paper Scissors" (2011)	"I Could Stay" (2011)	"Love Again" (2012)

I Could Stay is the second single from Canadian singer Kreesha Turner's second studio album, Tropic Electric. The song was written by Turner, Erika Nuri and Greg Ogan.

The single received Canadian airplay for almost two months before the song was official released onto iTunes. The iTunes single only contains the radio edit of the track, much like Turner's previous singles. "I Could Stay" was noted for referencing and sounding similar to Janet Jackson's "Runaway".

== Music video ==
The music video premiered on Turner's official VEVO channel, on November 15, 2011, the same day as the album Tropic Electric was released. The video was shot in Jamaica, as Turner wanted to capture the beauty of the country. Elements of the video, such as the scene in which Turner swings across water, were shot in the rain, due to a time limit placed on the production of the video.

== Charts ==
Chart (2011)	Peak position
Canada (Canadian Hot 100)	59

== Track listing ==
iTunes Single
No.	Title	Writer(s)	Length
1.	"I Could Stay (Radio Edit)"	Kreesha Turner, Erika Nuri & Greg Ogan	3:06
