= Fell in Love (disambiguation) =

"Fell in Love" is a 2023 song by Blink-182.

Fell in Love may also refer to:

- "Fell in Love", a song by Marshmello
- "Fell in Love", a song by Megan Thee Stallion from Megan: Act II
- "Fell in Love", a song by Nav

== See also ==
- "Fell in Luv", a song by Playboy Carti from Die Lit
- Fall in Love (disambiguation)
