= Inna Brayer =

American dancer

- Born: Moscow, Russia
- Education: Hunter College
- Occupation: Ballroom dancer
- Style: International 10-Dance
- Partner: Pasha Pashkov

Inna Brayer (born in Moscow, Russia) is a Brooklyn-based amateur ballroom dancer competing in the International 10-Dance division. She is best known for being the 2007 Amateur USA Dance National 10-Dance Champions with her partner, Pasha Pashkov. From 1998-1999, Brayer was partnered with fellow Dancing with the Stars co-star Maksim Chmerkovskiy's brother Valentin Chmerkovskiy.

A native of Russia, Brayer is of Jewish descent. She was raised in the U.S. from the age of 2, and began dancing at age 7. Her coaching has included Latin champions Taliat & Marina Tarsinov.

In addition to their 3-time U.S. title, Pashkov & Brayer have also placed 11th at the World Championships in Tokyo, and 9th at the World Cup in Vancouver.

Inna attended Hunter College in New York City, where she graduated in 2012.

On August 25, 2008, it was announced that Inna would be participating as a pro on Dancing with the Stars (U.S. season 7). She was paired with actor Ted McGinley. They were the second couple eliminated from the competition on the 1st Week.

As of 2019, Inna has 2 dance schools in New York which she owns. Although she retired from competitive dancing she is very much involved.
