= Lady Killer (Kreesha Turner song) =

Single by Kreesha Turner

from the album Passion
- Released: October 2008 (Canada)
- Recorded: 2007
- Genre: Pop, R&B
- Length: 3:35
- Label: EMI/Capitol
- Songwriter(s): Jon Levine & Kreesha Turner

Kreesha Turner singles chronology
"Don't Call Me Baby" (2008)	"Lady Killer" (2008)	"Talk" (2008)

"Lady Killer" is the fifth single from Canadian/Jamaican singer Kreesha Turner's debut studio album Passion. The single remained in the Canadian Hot 100 for thirteen consecutive weeks in the year of 2008.

== Music video ==
The music video for 'Lady Killer' was shot early spring 2009, in Havana, Cuba. It was uploaded to Turner's official YouTube channel on May 4, 2009. Directed by Aaron A, the video features Turner walking around balcony's in Havana, and at a club with heavy, dark make-up.

== Charts ==
Chart (2008)	Peak position
Canada (Canadian Hot 100)	54
