= Davitt Sigerson =

American songwriter and producer

- Born: 1957 (age 68–69)
- Origin: New York City, U.S.
- Genres: Pop; rock
- Occupations: Record producer; songwriter; singer; music executive; journalist
- Instrument: Vocals
- Labels: A&M; ZE

Davitt Sigerson (born 1957) is an American retired songwriter, record producer, record executive, and journalist.

== Early life and education ==
Davitt Sigerson was born in New York City and attended university at Oxford University in England.

== Career ==
Sigerson remained in England, writing about music for Black Music, Sounds, Melody Maker, and Time Out, before returning to the U.S. in 1979, from where he wrote for The Village Voice, Rolling Stone, and The New York Times. In 1976, he arranged a version of the Gamble and Huff song "For the Love of Money", released by the Disco Dub Band on the Movers label.

In the early 1980s, Sigerson released two solo albums for ZE as a singer-songwriter, Davitt Sigerson (1980) and Falling in Love Again (1984). Also, that year, he wrote and produced "No Time to Stop Believing" under the band name Daisy Chain. In 1990, he recorded a further album, Experiments in Terror, with keyboardist Bob Thiele Jr., as The Royal Macadamians.

Sigerson wrote songs for or with artists including Philip Bailey, Jim Henson, Loverboy, Prism, John Entwistle of the Who, and Gene Simmons of Kiss. He also produced records for Olivia Newton-John, the Bangles, Tori Amos, David & David, and others.

Sigerson became president of Polydor Records in 1991, president of EMI and Chrysalis Records in 1994, and chairman of Island Records from 1998 to 1999.

Faithful, Sigerson's only novel, was published in 2004 by Doubleday in the US.

Sigerson lives in New York City with his wife; they have two daughters.

== Discography ==
- Davitt Sigerson (ZE, 1980)
- Falling in Love Again (ZE, 1984)
- Experiments in Terror (Island, 1990) (as member of The Royal Macadamians)
