= Anjulie =

Canadian musician (born 1983)

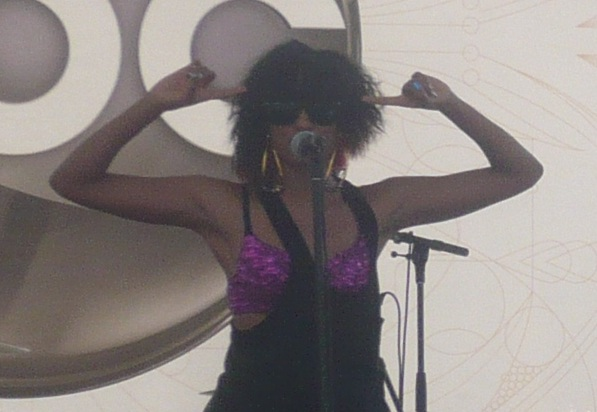
- Anjulie performing at the Lilith Fair in Cleveland, OH in 2010

Background information
- Born: Anjulie Persaud; May 21, 1983 (age 43); Oakville, Ontario, Canada
- Genres: Pop; alt-pop; R&B
- Occupations: Singer; songwriter
- Instruments: Vocals; percussion; guitar; piano; computer music
- Years active: 1998–present
- Labels: Universal Republic; Republic; Spinnin'; Monstercat
- Website: anjuliemusic.com

Anjulie Persaud (born May 21, 1983), known by the mononym Anjulie, is a Canadian singer and songwriter who has released one self-titled album, and has collaborated with Diplo, Zedd, Boombox Cartel, Kelly Clarkson, Lady Gaga, Nicki Minaj, TheFatRat, and Benny Benassi, among others. Her music has been featured on HBO, ABC, NBC and MTV.

== Biography ==
=== Early life ===
Anjulie was born and raised in Oakville, Ontario, and is the youngest of four children. Her parents are of Indo-Guyanese origin. She attended St. Ignatius of Loyola Catholic Secondary School.

=== Music career ===
Anjulie became "obsessed with music" and was inspired to become a performer after watching Janet Jackson's Velvet Rope Tour. She opened for Jesse McCartney during his United States tour in 2009. The songs, "Rain", "Crazy That Way", "The Heat", and "Boom" were featured on the MTV television series The Hills and "Addicted2Me" on The City. The single "Boom" has been featured on programs such as ABC's Eastwick, The CW's Melrose Place, and The Vampire Diaries.

Anjulie has toured with Shwayze and B.o.B., toured Fall/Winter (2009–2010) with Raphael Saadiq, and opened for Hedley on their tour in support of Storms.

In 2011, the songs "White Lights", "Brand New Bitch" (also known as "Brand New Chick"), "Stand Behind the Music", "Headphones", and "You and I" were produced. In 2011, the single "Brand New Bitch" was certified as a platinum digital download in Canada for over 80,000 units sold, and was nominated for Dance Recording of the Year at the 2012 Juno Awards. In support of her new single "You and I", Anjulie embarked on a You and I Tour in 2012. In the same year, it was announced that Universal Republic Records was going defunct, making artists from that label including Anjulie move from the roster to Republic Records.

The unreleased album, that aspired the compositions, is called Rainbow, Bullets. It was due for 2012–2013; the songs were released later in segments, of standalone singles. It's unknown if it will be on platforms in its full entirety.

Anjulie would later co-write and sing "Arrows in the Dark" on the Cash Cash album Blood, Sweat & 3 Years, which was released in 2016.

She released, finally in its exert association an album "Loveless, Metropolis" on digital outlets it length, consists of 8 selective tracks on, March 16, 2022

=== Songwriting and production ===
Anjulie began composing her own music as a teenager. She wrote the song "Say Goodbye to Jr. High", contributed background vocals and played percussion for the CD Unfabulous and More. Her debut album was co-written and produced by Jon Levine of The Philosopher Kings.

Anjulie wrote the single "Don't Call Me Baby" by Canadian recording artist Kreesha Turner together with two other songs on the album Passion.

She co-wrote the single "I Want You" with its performer Fefe Dobson, that appears on Dobson's album, Joy (2010). Anjulie's music is featured in the 2009 movie/musical Fame. She wrote and performed "Big Things" which plays during the opening scene of the film. "Stand Behind The Music" was covered by Cher Lloyd in 2012 for her album Sticks & Stones.

Anjulie also co-wrote "The Boys" by Nicki Minaj.

== Discography ==
Studio albums

- Anjulie (2009)

Extended plays

- Boom (2008)
- How It Feels to Lose You, Pt. 1 (2019)
- Loveless Metropolis (2022)

== Chart performance ==
Released on August 4, 2009, Anjulie's self-titled CD reached number two on the US Billboard Heatseekers Albums chart and number 108 on the Billboard 200 Albums chart. The album's first single "Boom", released in 2008, reached number one on the US Dance chart in 2009. Remixes of follow-up "Love Songs" reached the Top 10 on the US Hot Dance/Club Play chart in October 2009.

"Rain" debuted on the Hot Dance/Club Play chart in November 2009 at number forty-eight. After nine weeks on the chart it reached a peak of three.

== Awards and nominations ==
- 2009, nominated for an MTV Video Music Award for "Best Breakthrough Video"
- 2009, nominated for mtvU Woodie Award for "Best Video Woodie" for her single "Boom"
- 2012, nominated for Juno Award for Dance Recording of the Year for "Brand New Chick"
- 2013, won Juno Award for Dance Recording of the Year for "You and I"

== See also ==
- List of number-one dance hits (United States)
- List of artists who reached number one on the US Dance chart
