= Falling in Love =

Falling in Love or Fallin' in Love may refer to:

- Falling in love, the process of developing strong romantic feelings for another individual

== Film and television ==
- Falling in Love (1935 film), a British comedy film
- Falling in Love (1984 film), an American romantic drama starring Meryl Streep and Robert De Niro
- Falling in Love (TV series), a Malaysian-Singaporean drama

== Music ==
=== Albums ===
- Falling in Love (Rachelle Ann Go album) (2009)
- Falling in Love (Toni Gonzaga album) (2007)
- Fallin' in Love (album), a 1975 album by Hamilton, Joe Frank & Reynolds
- Falling in Love, a 1984 album by BZN

=== Songs ===
- "Falling in Love" (Surface song) (1983)
- "Falling in Love" (Ironik song) (2009)
- "Falling in Love" (McFly song) (2010)
- "Falling in Love" (Taio Cruz song) (2011)
- "Falling in Love" (2NE1 song) (2013)
- "Falling in Love (Uh-Oh)", a song by Miami Sound Machine featuring Gloria Estefan (1986)
- "Falling in Love (Is Hard on the Knees)", a song by Aerosmith (1997)
- "Fallin' in Love" (Hamilton, Joe Frank & Reynolds song) (1975)
- "Fallin' in Love" (Sylvia song) (1985)
- "Lady" (Dennis Wilson song), also known as "Fallin' in Love" (1970)
- "Falling in Love", a song by Cigarettes After Sex from Cry
- "Falling in Love", a song by Ira Losco
- "Falling in Love", a song by Randy Newman from Land of Dreams
- "Falling in Love", a song by Siti Nurhaliza from All Your Love
- "Falling in Love", a song by Woo Jin-young and Kim Hyun-soo from [Present]
- "Fallin' in Love", a song by the Souther–Hillman–Furay Band
- "Fallin' in Love", a song by Post Malone from F-1 Trillion

== Other uses ==
- Falling In Love (horse), an Indonesian racehorse

== See also ==
- Fall in Love (disambiguation)
- Falling in Love Again (disambiguation)
- "Falling in Love with Love", a show tune from the 1921 musical The Boys from Syracuse
