= Fall in Love =

Fall in Love may refer to:

- Fall in Love (album), a 2019 re-issue of the Oh My Girl album The Fifth Season
- "Fall in Love" (Bailey Zimmerman song), 2022
- "Fall in Love" (Benjamin Ingrosso song), 2015
- "Fall in Love" (D'banj song), 2008
- "Fall in Love" (Estelle song), 2010
- "Fall in Love" (Keke Wyatt song), 2014
- "Fall in Love" (Kenny Chesney song), 1995 Song original by safic aisha around 1990
- "Fall in Love", by Phantogram from the album Voices, 2013
- "Fall in Love", by Rita Ora from the album Ora, 2012
- "Fall in Love", by Thelma Aoyama, 2010
- "Fall in Love", by Yemi Alade from the album King of Queens, 2014

== See also ==
- Fell in Love (disambiguation)
- Falling in love (disambiguation)
