= Brand New Bitch =

Single by Anjulie

Single by Anjulie
- Released: May 23, 2011
- Genre: Dance-pop; electropop
- Length: 3:31
- Label: Universal Republic
- Songwriter(s): Anjulie Persaud; Michel Zitron
- Producer(s): J.O.B

Anjulie singles chronology
"Rain" (2009)	"Brand New Bitch" (2011)	"Stand Behind the Music" (2011)

"Brand New Bitch" (also known under its clean title "Brand New Chick") is a song written and recorded by Canadian singer-songwriter Anjulie. It was co-written by Michel Zitron and was produced by J.O.B. The song was released to digital retailers via Universal Republic Records on May 23, 2011.

"Brand New Chick" achieved moderate commercial success in Canada – it was certified Platinum by Music Canada and reached number 16 on the Billboard Canadian Hot 100. The song was a hit in dance venues, reaching number three on the US Billboard Hot Dance Club Songs chart as well as 24 on the now-defunct Global Dance Songs survey. At the 2012 Juno Awards, the track was nominated for Dance Recording of the Year but lost out to "Hello" by Martin Solveig and Dragonette.

== Commercial performance ==
"Brand New Bitch" debuted at number eighty-four on the Billboard Canadian Hot 100 for the week ending July 2, 2011. It reached its peak position of sixteen for the week ending September 24, 2011. The song peaked at number nineteen on the Hot Canadian Digital Songs component chart in October 2011. Though its peak positions are unverifiable, "Brand New Bitch" rose to at least 7 on the Canada CHR/Top 40 and number 12 on the Canada Hot AC formats, according to archived charts compiled by Nielsen Broadcast Data Systems. In November 2011, "Brand New Bitch" was certified Platinum by Music Canada for digital sales exceeding 80,000 units.

In the United States, "Brand New Bitch" debuted at number thirty-six on the Billboard Hot Dance Club Songs chart for the week ending October 29, 2011 and peaked at number 3 on the chart dated December 17, 2011. It is her fourth consecutive top-ten hit on the chart, and was her last single to appear on the chart as of June 2015. The song additionally charted at number twenty-four on the now-defunct Global Dance Songs chart compiled by Billboard which ranked songs by airplay in nightclubs.

== Music video ==
The official music video for "Brand New Bitch" directed by Hannah Lux Davis, premiered August 11, 2011, has Anjulie portraying a woman who is resurrected in a laboratory illuminated by neon nightclub-inspired lights, inspired loosely by the story of Frankenstein.

== Track listings ==
Digital download — single (Explicit)

1. "Brand New Bitch" – 3:31

Digital download — single (Clean)

1. "Brand New Chick" – 3:32

Brand New Bitch (The Remixes) — EP

1. "Brand New Bitch" – 3:31
2. "Brand New Bitch (LBL Extended Remix)" – 5:44
3. "Brand New Bitch (LBL Radio Remix)" – 3:16
4. "Brand New Bitch (Love Automatic Remix)" – 6:01
5. "Brand New Bitch (Hoxx Whores Remix)" – 6:49
6. "Brand New Bitch (Micky Fortune Remix)" – 5:32
7. "Brand New Bitch (Black Cards Remix)" – 4:26

== Charts and certifications ==
=== Weekly charts ===
Chart (2011)	Peak position
Canada (Canadian Hot 100)	16
Canada CHR/Top 40 (Billboard)	7
Canada Hot AC (Billboard)	12
Global Dance Songs (Billboard)	24
US Dance Club Songs (Billboard)	3

=== Year-end charts ===
Chart (2011)	Position
Canada (Canadian Hot 100)	52

=== Certifications ===
Region	Certification
Canada (Music Canada)	Platinum

== Release history ==
Country	Date	Format	Ref.
Canada	May 23, 2011	Digital download	
United States	May 23, 2011	Digital download	
Canada	January 24, 2012	Digital download (Remixes EP)	
United States	January 24, 2012	Digital download (Remixes EP)	
United States	February 21, 2012	Contemporary hit radio	
