= Don't Call Me Baby (Kreesha Turner song) =

Single by Kreesha Turner

from the album Passion
- Released: May 20, 2008
- Genre: Pop; R&B; dance
- Length: 3:24
- Label: EMI; Capitol
- Songwriter(s): Jon Levine; Anjulie Persaud
- Producer(s): Jon Levine

Kreesha Turner singles chronology
"Bounce With Me" (2007)	"Don't Call Me Baby" (2008)	"Lady Killer" (2008)

"Don't Call Me Baby" is a pop–R&B song performed by Canadian singer Kreesha Turner for her debut studio album, Passion (2008). The track was released as the album's third single in May 2008 in Canada. It has since peaked at #8 on the Canadian Hot 100. The track was later released in the United States in June 2008 and went on to peak at #1 on the Hot Dance Club Play chart.

In 2022, this song was used as a lip sync number in the third season of Canada's Drag Race.

== Track listing ==
Canadian Digital single

1. Don't Call Me Baby (Radio Mix)

US Digital single

1. Don't Call Me Baby (Top 40 Mix)

Other Versions

- (Digital Dog Club Mix)
- (Digital Dog Radio Edit)
- (Bimbo Jones Club Mix)
- (Bimbo Jones Radio Edit)

== Release history ==
Region	Date
Canada	May 20, 2008
United States	June 17, 2008

== Charts ==
=== Weekly charts ===
Chart (2008)	Peak position
Canada (Canadian Hot 100)	8
Canada AC (Billboard)	1
Canada CHR/Top 40 (Billboard)	6
Canada Hot AC (Billboard)	7
U.S. Billboard Hot Dance Club Play	1

=== Year-end charts ===
Chart (2008)	Position
Canadian Hot 100	26
Canada AC (Billboard)	15
Canada CHR/Top 40 (Billboard)	18
