= Mobile Backstage =

Mobile Backstage is an application developed by Steam Republic. It provides a fan club service and can be accessed on the web, Facebook or mobile devices.

The Mobile Backstage platform allows music artists and their fans to interact and share experiences with each other more accessibly. It includes a content management system, which enables artists or their production companies to post up-to-date information about a band's activities. These posts can include text, images, or video clips, while being able to integrate with Twitter, Facebook, and iTunes. This app also provides the band with analytics on fan activities and events.

== Background ==
In January 2007, two Finnish companies, Mobile Backstage and Geniem, won the FinNode Web-2-Mobile competition with their idea of creating a mobile app that could connect famous artists to their fans more easily. Development of the app began after the founding of the company Steam Republic by Paavo Bäckman and Jussi Ruusila, which was officially registered in November 2009 in Tampere, Finland. In early 2012, the company closed a bridge funding round of $1.3 million (€1 million). Wired Magazine UK listed Steam Republic in their article titled "Europe’s 100 Hottest Startups of 2012."

== Features ==
The Mobile Backstage app was originally developed for iOS. A Facebook version was announced in June 2011, followed closely by an Android one in November 2011 and a web version in January 2012. Nokia's MeeGo and QT platforms were also supported until June 2012, when Evanescence announced their Mobile Backstage, but most following artists have stopped offering this option.

== Artists with Mobile Backstages ==
Some of the artists with their own Mobile Backstage in August 2012 include Evanescence, Anthrax, Mumford & Sons, Slightly Stoopid, Nightwish, Jessie J, Tinie Tempah, Amorphis, The Kooks, Black Label Society, Lykke Li, Rusko, Rebelution, Ensiferum and Johnny Reid.
