= Falling in Love Again (Davitt Sigerson album) =

Studio album by Davitt Sigerson
- Released: 1984
- Genre: Rock
- Label: ZE
- Producers: Davitt Sigerson, Michael Zilkha

Davitt Sigerson chronology
Davitt Sigerson (1980)	Falling in Love Again (1984)	Experiments in Terror (1990)

Professional ratings
Review scores
Source	Rating
AllMusic	4/5 stars
Robert Christgau	B+

Falling in Love Again is the second studio album by the American singer-songwriter Davitt Sigerson. It was originally released worldwide in 1984 on the record label ZE.

== Track listing ==
All tracks composed and arranged by Davitt Sigerson

1. "Over and Over"
2. "Jones"
3. "Danish Modern"
4. "Another Day Another Doll"
5. "My True Feelings"
6. "Once You've Been There"
7. "Half Life"
8. "Divorce"
9. "Activate"

== Personnel ==
- Davitt Sigerson - vocals
- Mike Sheppard - bass, guitar
- Rick Stevenson - synthesizer programming
- Bob Thiele, Jr. - additional vocals and keyboards
- Anna Fell - bass viol
- David Young - additional guitar
- Bob Riley, Preston Heyman - additional drums
- Amy Kanter, Elaine Caswell - additional vocals

Technical

- Carl Beatty, Mike Sheppard - engineer
- Tom Wilkes - design
