= Anjulie (album) =

Studio album by Anjulie
- Released: August 4, 2009
- Genre: Pop, R&B
- Label: Hear Music
- Producer: John Burk, Jon Levine, The Transcenders, Colin Wolfe

Anjulie chronology
Boom (2008)	Anjulie (2009)	How It Feels to Lose You, Pt. 1 (2019)

Singles from Anjulie
- 1. "Day Will Soon Come" Released: 2008; 2. "Boom" Released: 2008; 3. "Rain" Released: 2009; 4. "Love Songs" Released: 2009

Anjulie is the debut studio album by the Canadian recording artist Anjulie, released by Starbucks record label Hear Music on August 4, 2009, in Canada and the United States. It was produced by John Burk, Jon Levine, The Transcenders and Colin Wolfe and reached number two on the US Billboard Heatseekers Albums chart.

The album received generally positive reviews from critics, with Allmusic noting that "while the record's not without its rough patches, dully derivative moments, and false notes, Anjulie is quite impressive as an opening salvo from a talented musical collagist whose minor flurry of hype is well-warranted."

Professional ratings
Aggregate scores
Source	Rating
Metacritic	(66/100)
Review scores
Source	Rating
AllMusic	4/5 stars
Boston Globe	(favorable)
Slant Magazine	3/5 stars
Robert Christgau	(choice cut)
PopMatters	(5/10)

== Track listing ==
No.	Title	Writer(s)	Length
1.	"Boom"	Anjulie Persaud, Jon Levine	3:14
2.	"Rain"	Persaud, Levine	3:52
3.	"Some Dumb Girl"	Persaud, Colin Wolfe	4:29
4.	"Addicted2Me"	Persaud, Levine	3:07
5.	"Crazy That Way" (Intro)	Persaud	0:38
6.	"Crazy That Way"	Persaud, Levine	2:30
7.	"Fatal Attraction"	Persaud, Levine, Brian West	3:13
8.	"The Heat"	Persaud, Levine	2:59
9.	"Colombia"	Persaud	2:45
10.	"Same Damn Thing"	Persaud, Wolfe	3:44
11.	"I Want the World to Know"	Persaud, Wolfe	3:32
12.	"Love Songs"	Persaud, Levine	3:18
13.	"Day Will Soon Come"	Persaud, Levine	6:26
14.	"When, It's Love (CD OMITS THE BONUS TRACK - DIGITAL ONLY) "	Persaud, KristIan Ottestad, Nate Company	2:36

== Charts ==
Chart (2009)	Peak position
US Billboard 200	108
US Billboard Heatseekers Albums	2
