= Passion (Kreesha Turner album) =

Studio album by Kreesha Turner
- Released: August 12, 2008
- Length: 55:32
- Labels: EMI; Capitol
- Producers: Brass'n'Blues; Alisha Brooks; Lashaunda Carr; Devo Harris; Mike James; Jon Levine; Harold Lilly; Aaron Pearce; Julio Reyes Copello; Troy Samson

Kreesha Turner chronology
Passion (2008)	Tropic Electric (2011)

Singles from Passion
- 1. "Simple" Released: November 13, 2007; 2. "Bounce With Me" Released: December 4, 2007; 3. "Don't Call Me Baby" Released: May 20, 2008; 4. "Lady Killer" Released: October 2008; 5. "Talk (Radio Only)" Released: October 2009; 6. "Passion" Released: July 7, 2009

Passion is the debut studio album by Canadian singer Kreesha Turner. It was released by Capitol Records and EMI on August 12, 2008, in Canada and in early 2009 in the United States. Passion became available for advanced streaming on MuchMusic.com a week earlier.

In early August 2008, the album was leaked onto MTV Canada's The Leak on its official website.

Although Turner originally signed in the US to Virgin Records, a Capitol Music Group label, her first American release was instead on the Capitol Records imprint, also within the Capitol Music Group. This maintained consistency with her Canadian releases under EMI Music Canada which uses the Capitol Records imprint and are copyrighted by Capitol Records, LLC.

== Singles ==
Six singles were released from the album, one exclusively to Canada. The first single, "Simple" was released on November 13, 2007, on iTunes as a single and as an EP. Despite positive reviews, the single did not chart.

"Bounce With Me", was released on December 4, 2007. The song peaked at number 53 on the Canadian Hot 100, number 64 on the Hot Canadian Digital Singles, and number 11 on the Hot Canadian Emerging Artists Songs.

"Don't Call Me Baby charted at number 8 on the Canadian Hot 100, and number 1 on the U.S. Billboard Hot Dance Club Play, number 16 on the International Global Dance Tracks chart, and number 1 on the Hot Canadian Emerging Artists Songs chart.

"Lady Killer" was not as successful, topping out at 54 on the Canadian Hot 100.

"Talk", was sent exclusively to Canadian radio, the album's only radio single. The song did not chart.

"Passion" was released first to the U.S. on September 26, 2008, and was unsuccessful. It was released in Canada on July 7, 2009, and remains uncharted.

The majority of the singles from the album did not chart well. 'Shattered' received some Canadian radio airplay, but was not a single.

Four singles from the album were used in television shows, movies and advertisements:

=== Television ===
- "Bounce with Me" was used in Moonlight, Brothers & Sisters, Gossip Girl, The Hills, Entourage, Lipstick Jungle and Ugly Betty (in the episode "Burning Questions").
- "Simple" was used in Ugly Betty in the episode "Ugly Berry".
- "Passion" was used by Desperate Housewives for the 2008 North American radio and television commercial campaign and also in The Hills.
- "Chains of Love" was used in Lipstick Jungle.

=== Films ===
- "Bounce with Me" was used in You Again and What Happens in Vegas.

=== Advertisements ===
- "Bounce With Me" was used in one of Nikon's 2008 global commercials featuring Ashton Kutcher, in Nike's 2008 national woman's campaign and in a Kit Kat 2009 national commercial that also starred "Kreesha Turner"
- "Passion" was used by Playtex in a 2009 national commercial

== Critical reception ==
Professional ratings
Review scores
Source	Rating
Toronto Star	2.5/4 stars

Toronto Star dritic Ashante Infantry called Turner a "pleasant though not particularly distinctive voice, delivering strident R&B/pop reminiscent of Amerie and Keshia Chanté. But the 23-year-old singer, who co-wrote several tracks along with Jon Levine and Estelle, shows promise of depth." AllMusic editor Anthony Tognazzini found that "Turner's media tag as "the Canadian Rihanna" isn't far off. Turner's blend of R&B, pop, and hip-hop is as hook-filled and radio-ready as Rihanna's, and singles as infectious as "Bounce With Me" indicate that the artist has the goods to burn up the charts." He condluded: "Passion [...] presents Turner's breezy, sexy sound fully formed, centering on her strongly crafted tunes and distinctive voice (which bears a slight resemblance to neo-soul divas like Erykah Badu and Macy Gray)." Sandra Sperounes from The Edmonton Journal felt that "Passion showcases Turner's sumptious [sic] vocal range — from girlish to retro soul to cool jazz."

== Track listing ==
Passion track listing
No.	Title	Writer(s)	Producer(s)	Length
1.	"Passion"	Kreesha Turner; Alisha Brooks; Aaron Pearce	Pearce	4:14
2.	"Chains of Love"	Turner; Jon Levine; Anjulie Persaud	Levine	3:47
3.	"Don't Call Me Baby"	Levine; Persaud	Levine	3:21
4.	"Shattered"	Troy Samson; Mike James	Samson; James	4:18
5.	"Beautiful"	Turner; Levine; Persaud	Levine	3:04
6.	"Bounce With Me"	Samson; James	Samson; James	3:07
7.	"Always (Lovin' You)"	Tom Craskey; Devo Harris; Estelle Swaray; Minnie Riperton; Richard Rudolph	Harris; Craskey^{[a]}	4:36
8.	"Simple"	Brooks; Lashaunda Carr; Jacqueal Jackson	Brooks; Carr	3:28
9.	"There"	Harold Lilly; Robert T. Gerongco; Samuel T. Gerongco	Brass'n'Blues; Lilly	2:58
10.	"Lady Killer"	Levine; Turner	Levine	3:35
11.	"Black Magic"	Levine; Jalacy Hawkins	Levine	4:17
12.	"My Place"	Turner; Troy Samson; Mike James	Levine	4:17
13.	"If You See Him"	Levine	Levine	2:19

Bonus track(s)
No.	Title	Writer(s)	Producer(s)	Length
14.	"Dear John"	Turner; Levine; Haydain Neale	Levine	4:30
15.	"Don't Call Me Baby" (Rhythm Mix)	Levine; Persaud	Levine	3:25
16.	"Don't Call Me Baby" (GimmeMoreClub Mix)	Levine; Persaud	Levine	3:29

Walmart digital bonus track(s)
No.	Title	Writer(s)	Producer(s)	Length
17.	"Talk"	Julio Reyes Copello; Elvia Knoll	Reyes Copello	4:30

Notes

- ^{^a} signifies a co-producer

== Charts ==
Weekly chart performance for Passion
Chart (2008)	Peak position
Canadian Album (Billboard)	11
