= Bounce with Me (Kreesha Turner song) =

"Bounce With Me"

Single by Kreesha Turner

from the album Passion
- Released: December 4, 2007 (Canada)
- Recorded: 2007
- Genre: Dance-pop, R&B
- Length: 3:08
- Label: EMI/Capitol
- Songwriter(s): Mike James, Troy Samson
- Producer(s): Mike James & Troy Samson (Hipjoint Productions)

Kreesha Turner singles chronology
"Simple" (2007)	"Bounce With Me" (2007)	"Don't Call Me Baby" (2008)

"Bounce with Me" is a single released by Canadian singer Kreesha Turner, written and produced by Mike James and Troy Samson of Hipjoint Productions and released on December 4, 2007.

== Music video ==
The music video opens with Turner getting ready to go to the club. When she and her friends arrive at the club they are the only ones dancing. By the end of the first chorus everybody in the club is dancing to music. Turner then notices a guy from across the room and they keep eyeing each other and finally start dancing. By the end of the music video there are soap suds falling from the ceiling and onto the dance floor. Throughout the video there are scenes of Turner singing to the camera in front of a pink and white background.

== Charts ==
Chart (2008)	Peak position
Canada (Canadian Hot 100)	53

== Track listing ==
=== iTunes Single ===
1. "Bounce With Me" - 3:08
