= Kreesha Turner =

Canadian musical artist and songwriter

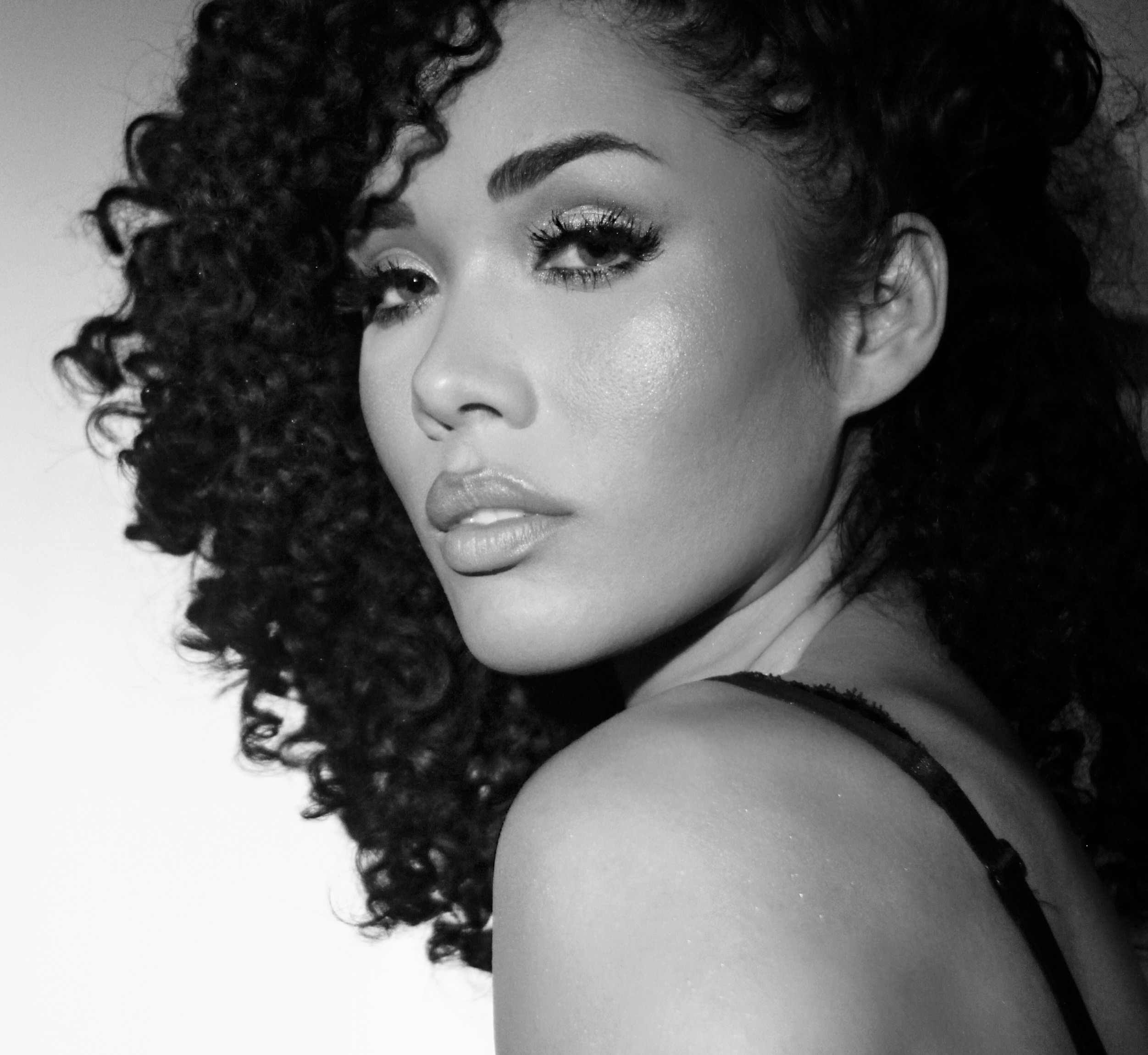
- Headshot of Turner from 2014

Background information
- Born: June 10, 1985 (age 41); Edmonton, Alberta, Canada
- Genres: Dance-pop; R&B; reggae fusion
- Occupation: Singer-songwriter
- Instrument: Vocals
- Years active: 2003–present
- Labels: EMI Music Canada (2006–2013); Capitol (2006–2013) Republic (2014–2016)
- Website: www.kreeshaturner.com

Kreesha Turner (born June 10, 1985) is a Canadian singer and songwriter, born in Edmonton, Alberta, Canada. Raised in both Canada and Jamaica, she began her musical career after a successful audition with Virgin Records. She signed a record deal with the Capitol Music Group, under which the Virgin imprint operates. Concurrently, EMI Music Canada signed her to more effectively tap into the Canadian market.

She has released two albums in Canada. Her first album Passion (2008) spawned singles "Bounce With Me," "Lady Killer" and "Don't Call Me Baby". The latter became the No. 1 most played song (by a Canadian) on Canadian radio in 2008 and became her very first number one single on Billboard's U.S. Hot Dance Club Play. During this year, she was nominated for two Juno Awards for "Best New Artist" and "Best Pop Album of the Year." Her second double disc studio album, Tropic Electric (2011) saw Turner alter her public image and return to her original sound. She released three moderately successful singles "Rock Paper Scissors," "I Could Stay," and "Love Again." which gained her another Juno Award Nomination for "Best R&B Album."

Throughout Turner's career, she has been well known for her style and image. She's been ranked on Complex magazine list of "25 Sexiest International Singers You've Never Heard Of" and MuchMusic's "Sexiest Girls list" in 2008. She has been featured on multiple major Canadian magazine covers and starred in a national Kit Kat campaign. Her music has been featured on major network television shows such as Entourage, Desperate Housewives, Ugly Betty, Gossip Girl, The Hills, Keeping Up With the Kardashians, Smash, Lipstick Jungle and Brothers & Sisters.

== Biography ==
=== Early life ===
The oldest of three children born to a Canadian father of Scottish ancestry and a Jamaican mother of African and Chinese descent, Turner was born in Edmonton, Alberta. As a young child, Turner danced in her bedroom to music by jazz musician Oscar Peterson. Turner has always mentioned jazz as an inspiration, especially artists such as Ella Fitzgerald, Billie Holiday and Peggy Lee.

In 2000, when Turner was 15, her mother sent her to Jamaica to live and experience Jamaican culture. Turner quickly learned that singing is a big part of everyday life in Jamaica, particularly at the Pentecostal church. Friends convinced her to audition for the youth choir despite her own belief that she could not sing. On the strength of her rendition of Canada's national anthem, Turner was accepted into the choir and began singing gospel songs at the Faith Temple Tabernacle in Bayside, Portmore. Turner says this is the time she realized she loved to sing. She went to Victoria School of the Arts in Edmonton, Alberta, Canada prior to her high school years in Jamaica. Turner attended Wolmer's Girl School in Kingston, Jamaica from 2000 to 2002. She attended Harry Ainlay Composite High School in Edmonton, Alberta, Canada after returning from Jamaica which she then graduated from in 2003.

=== Musical beginnings ===
In 2003, immediately after graduating from high school, Turner became an active member of the underground urban/hip-hop community. Writing, recording and performing all her own material, she aggressively began pursuing her musical career. Turner quickly gained attention from her peers, developing an underground fan base that had a number of industry insiders excited. Turner performed on any and every stage she could, entering and winning several competitions, but it was not until a couple of years later that she was successful.

In 2005, Turner won a talent contest in Edmonton organised by local radio station The Bounce (91.7 FM). Winning the contest allowed her to record four studio tracks in Vancouver with songwriting/production team, Hipjoint Productions, the most important to Kreesha's career being "Bounce With Me". This was noticed by urban and R&B music manager and Canadian entertainment mogul Chris Smith (Nelly Furtado, Fefe Dobson, Tamia) and led to the start of her mainstream music career.

=== 2007–2010: Passion ===
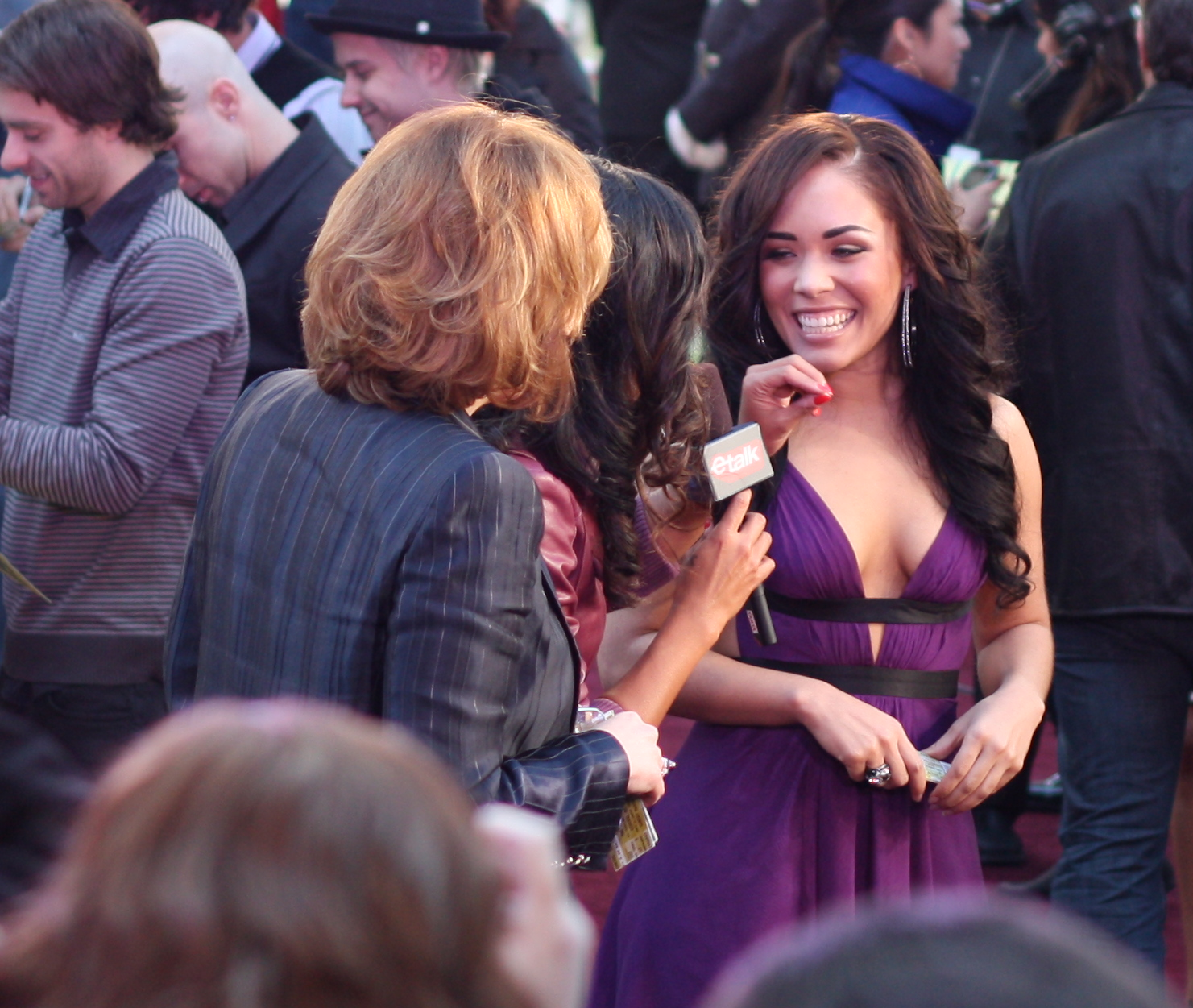
Turner at the 2009 Juno Awards

After a successful audition with Virgin Records, she signed a record deal with the Capitol Music Group, under which the Virgin imprint operates. Concurrently, EMI Music Canada signed her to more effectively tap into the Canadian market.

Before her mainstream success, the singer's song "Bounce With Me" was heard as early as spring 2006 on Vancouver stations but was not officially released as a single until 2007. Her first official video was for, "Bounce With Me", which was released to iTunes on December 4, 2007. This single became her first to enter the charts, peaking at number 53 on the Canadian Hot 100. Her follow-up single, "Don't Call Me Baby", was released to radio in April 2008 and on iTunes May 20, 2008. It eventually rose in the Canadian Hot 100 from No. 41 to No. 8, making "Don't Call Me Baby" her first Canadian Top 10 single. "Don't Call Me Baby" reached No. 1 on the Canadian sub HOT AC Charts and remained there for eight consecutive weeks.

On August 5, 2008, Turner's debut album, Passion, was made available for advanced streaming on MuchMusic.com. On August 12, 2008, Passion was released in Canada.

On November 22, 2008, Turner had her first US number-one with her single "Don't Call Me Baby" on the US Billboard Dance Charts.

On March 13, 2009, Turner received an award for "Best New Group/Solo Artist (Rhythmic/Dance/Urban)" at the Canadian Radio Music Awards in Toronto – her first award for her musical contribution. Turner was nominated for two Juno Awards: New Artist of the Year and Pop Album of the Year. Leading up to the 2009 Juno Awards, Turner appeared in a number of heavily aired Nestle Kit Kat Senses commercials, which feature the singer and her hit song "Bounce With Me".

Turner returned to Hipjoint Productions in Vancouver in spring 2009 to sing on "Dust in Gravity", a song by alt-pop band Delerium which was featured on a new remix collection released in 2010. "Dust In Gravity" featuring lead vocals by Turner reached number-one on the US Billboard Dance Charts on June 5, 2010, giving Turner her second number-one in the US.

=== 2011–2012: Tropic Electric ===
On July 5, 2011, Turner premiered her new single, "Rock Paper Scissors". In September of that year, Turner premiered another new single, "I Could Stay", on Canadian radio. Turner released her second album, Tropic Electric in November 2011. She released it as a double disc, one side Tropic, and the other Electric. The Tropic side was recorded in Jamaica, to capture a new type of genre, a mix of reggae and pop music. The Electric side of the album is dedicated to fans who enjoyed the vibe on her previous album, Passion. The third single from the album is "Love Again", which was released in April 2012. In May 2012, Turner provided vocals for Spanish DJ Wally Lopez's debut single "Keep Running the Melody". The song was written by Eritza Laues, Angel David Lopez Alvarez and Ian Alec Harvey Dench. After premiering May 18, 2012, after a series of previews being released onto Lopez's YouTube channel, the song reached No. 1 on the iTunes sales charts within 3 hours of its release. The track later reached No. 1 on multiple charts in Spain, and was a summer hit across the country.

Turner performed her song "Love Again" on the Much Music Video Awards pre show.

=== 2013–2014: Evolution Inevitable ===
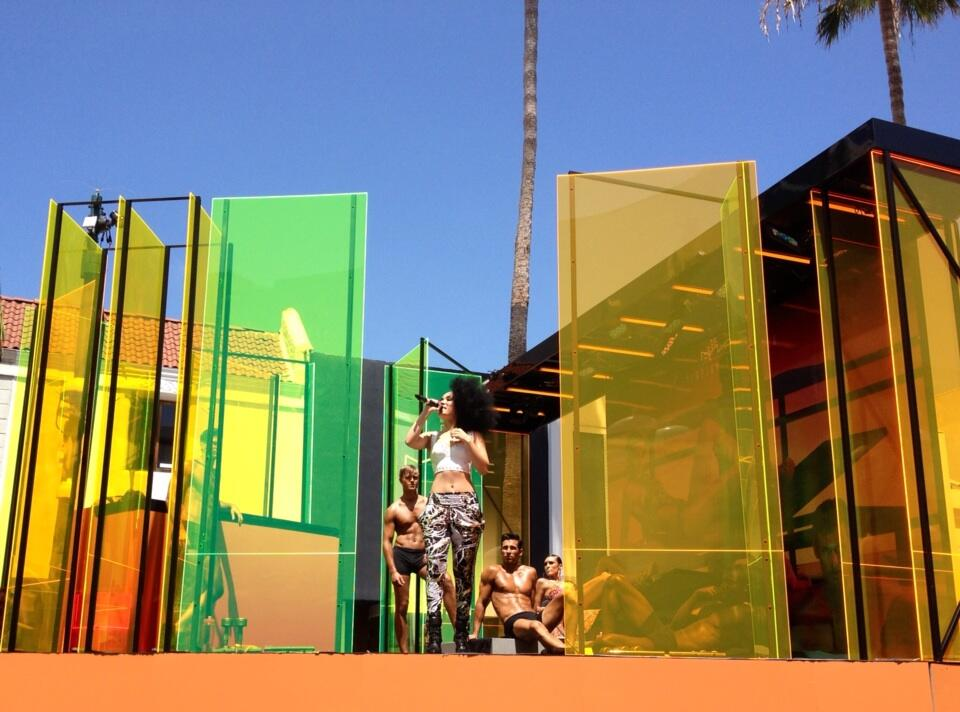
Turner in Santa Monica performing for MAC Cosmetics

In February 2013, producer Young Yonny along with Turner began dropping hints about their new project, tweeting to the hashtag "#EvolutionInevitable". Turner later revealed this would be her upcoming EP's title, and that the project is a significant departure from her previous sound, incorporating hip-hop and dancehall. On April 12, 2013, Turner premiered a new song sung to the instrumental of Lil Wayne's "Mo' Fire", titled "Mo' Fire (Remix)". A music video for the song premiered on April 17, 2013.

Turner announced in an interview that the album is now finished and will be released this year. Turner describes her new album as, "aggressive and in your face, full of sass and completely swagged out. The overall energy is different from my earlier albums. It’s very hip hop." The first single from the album is "MJ" and will be available on ITunes internationally. The music video will be premiering on VEVO May 13, 2014. The album features Kardinal Offishall, while rappers King Chip and Ty Dolla $ign are rumored to be included as well.

=== 2014–Present: Second Life ===
After the release of "MJ", Turner found new management under Nick Cannon and the Ncredible imprint. She was then signed by Charlie Walk and Monte Lipman to Republic Records, and her musical sound shifted towards dancehall/reggae. In 2015, she released a single called "Sexy Gal" featuring T.O.K, which received moderate success in the Caribbean and dancehall/reggae community. She went on to record and release a song with Shaggy and Costi called "Reggae Dancer" that received great success overseas but never gained popularity in the United States.

Turner also collaborated with a number of notable modern reggae acts, including Collie Buddz, Ky-Mani Marley, Konshens, and K'Coneil, releasing a number of moderately successful records with them. Her last musical release was in 2017.

Turner then shifted her focus to the world of finance, teaching online about financial literacy, investing in the stock market, and other related topics under the nickname #StockBae.

In addition to her work in finance, Turner has also continued to be involved behind the camera in film and television as a producer. Despite her shift in focus, Turner's musical career has left a lasting impact, with her unique blend of reggae, dancehall, and hip-hop continuing to inspire other artists in the genre.

== Artistry ==
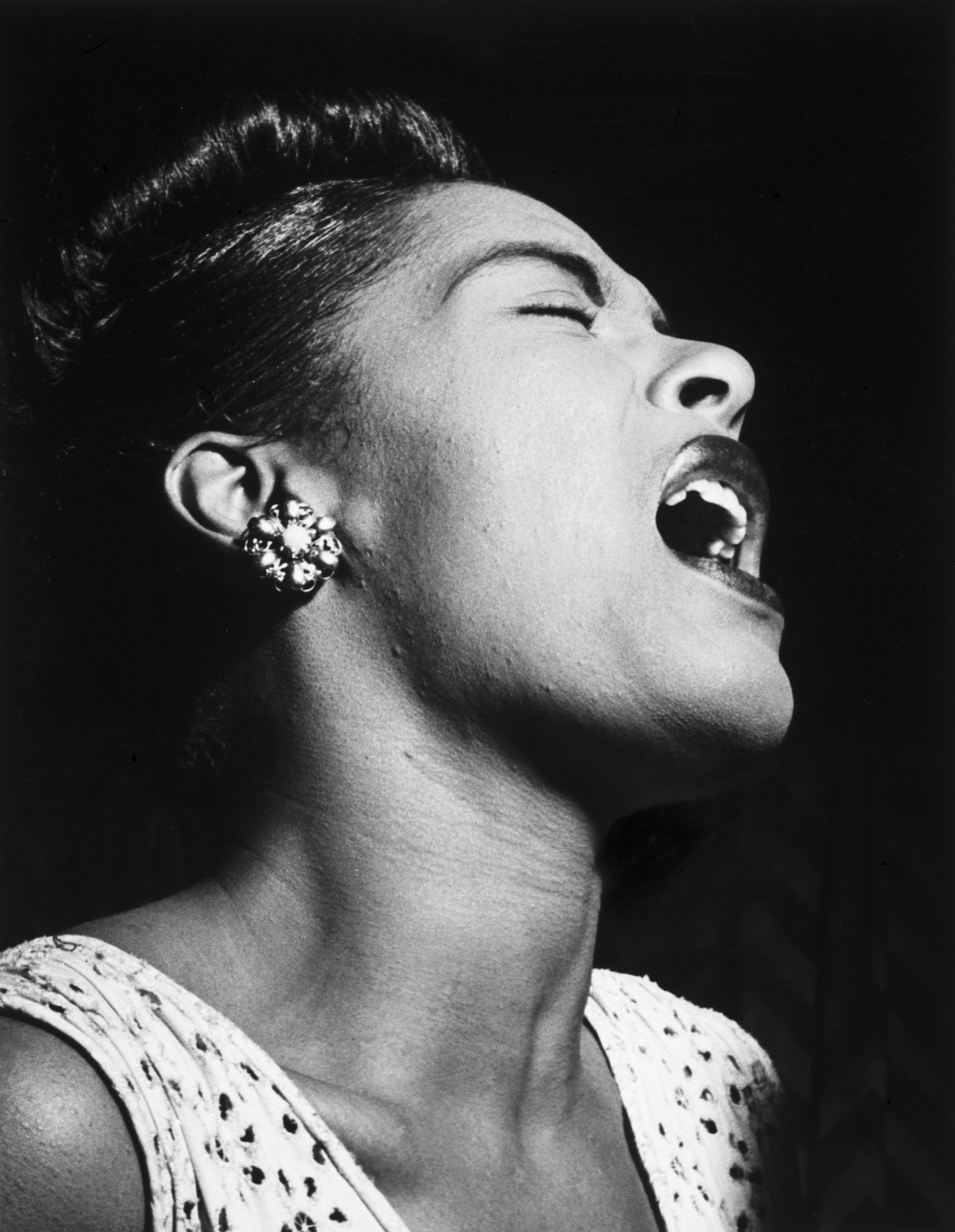
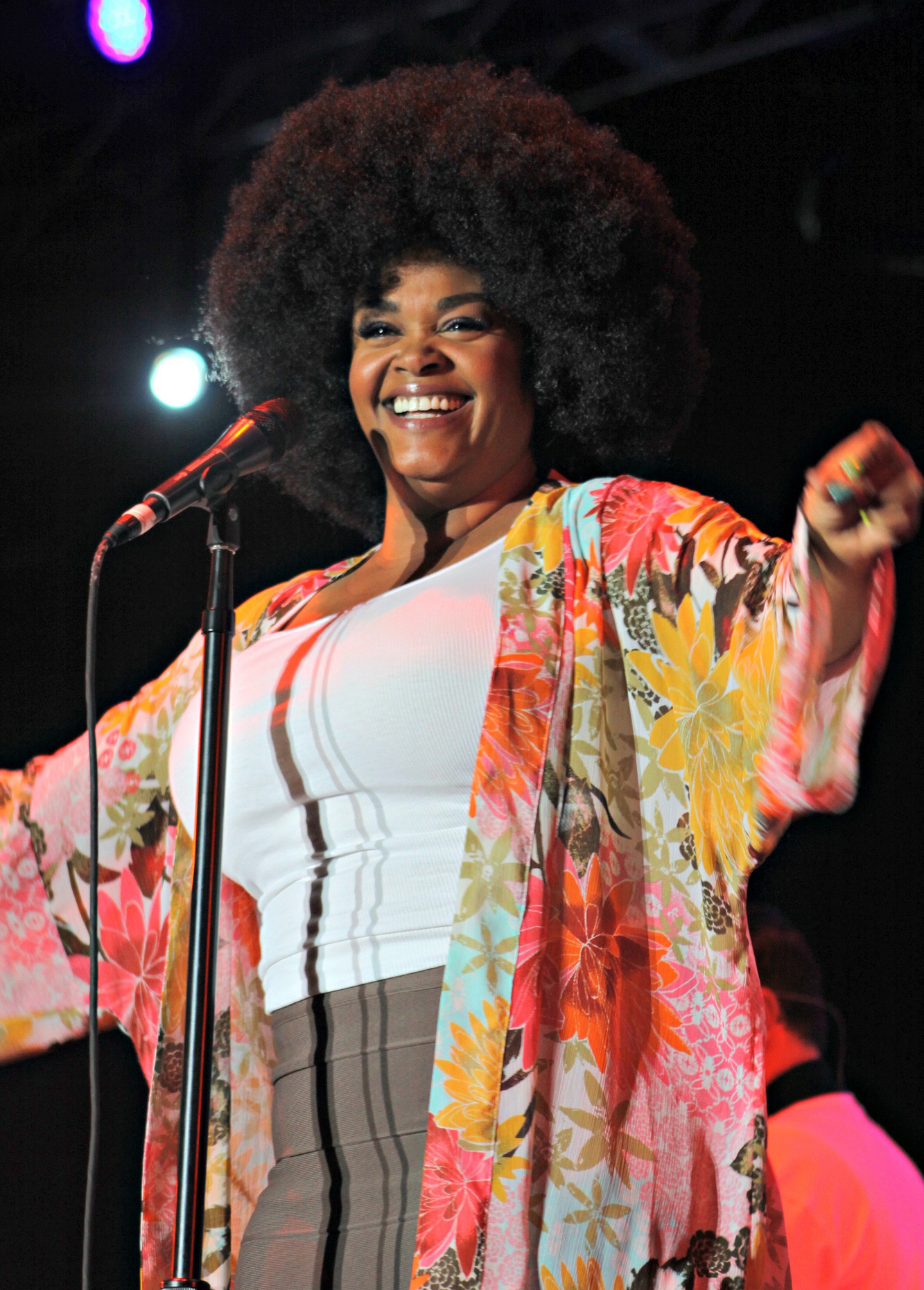
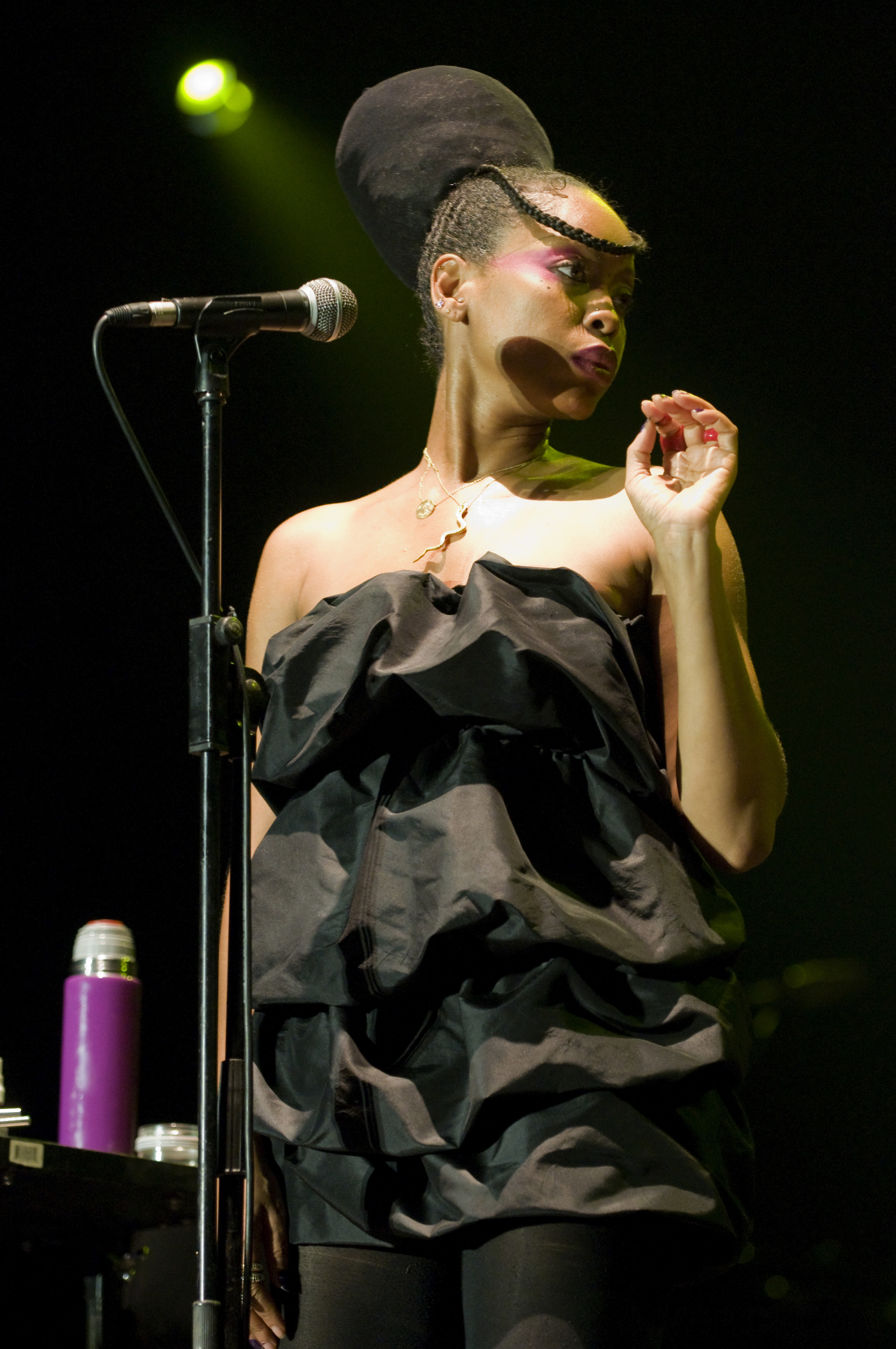
Billie Holiday (left), Jill Scott (middle) and Erykah Badu (right), among others, are cited as inspirations by Kreesha Turner.

=== Musical style and voice ===
Turner possesses the vocal range of Jazz and soprano. She spoke of her beginning with understanding music by stating "I started doing everything I possibly could: I did vocal, guitar, piano, music theatre, acting; I was a part of a gospel choir, jazz choir, I started writing, recording my own material. It was about increasing my odds, and also, increasing my knowledge." On Passion, Kreesha co-wrote just five songs, among them, the album’s title track. That first time out, she went into every writing session with the mindset of a student. "I’d work with a songwriter and they’d ask ‘how do you want to approach this? And I’d say, ‘no, how do you work as a songwriter?’ I wanted to learn, to gain tools to put into my own songwriting tool kit." In early 2010, when Kreesha began the writing/recording process for Tropic Electric, she brought that tool kit to work every day. "Last time I watched them build the house. This time I felt I could grab the tools and do it myself. I was there for the creation of every song and influenced every element.

=== Influences ===
Turner cites the country Jamaica music scene as her inspiration in embarking on a music career. Also, Turner has mentioned jazz as an inspiration, especially artists such as Ella Fitzgerald, Billie Holiday and Peggy Lee. Turner's musical tastes developed when she discovered the music of Erykah Badu and Jill Scott.

=== Personal life ===
In 2010, Kreesha Turner married Quinton Ward, who was a sports manager and was acting as Kreesha's manager at the time. They are now separated. She owns a pet Shiba Inu named Panda.

== Awards and nominations ==
| Year | Award | Result |
|---|---|---|
| 2009 | Juno Award for Best New Artist | Nominated |
| 2009 | Juno Award for Pop Album of the Year | Nominated |
| 2009 | Canadian Radio Music Awards Best New Group/Solo Artist | Won |
| 2009 | MuchMusic Video Awards for International Video of the Year by a Canadian | Nominated |
| 2012 | MuchMusic Video Awards for Cinematography Video of the Year | Nominated |
| 2013 | Juno Award for R&B/Soul Recording of the Year | Nominated |
| 2015 | Juno Award for Reggae Recording of the Year | Nominated |
| 2018 | Juno Award for Reggae Recording of the Year | Nominated |

== Discography ==
=== Studio albums ===
List of albums with selected chart positions
| Title | Year | Peak chart positions |
| Title | Year | Canadian Albums |
|---|---|---|
| Passion | 2008 | 11 |
| Tropic Electric | 2011 | — |

=== Singles ===
| Title | Year | Peak chart positions | | | | | Certifications | Album |
| Title | Year | CAN | CAN AC | CAN CHR | CAN HAC | U.S. Dance | Certifications | Album |
|---|---|---|---|---|---|---|---|---|
| "Bounce With Me" | 2007 | 53 | — | 23 | 26 | — | | Passion |
| "Don't Call Me Baby" | 2008 | 8 | 1 | 6 | 7 | 1 | CAN: Platinum | Passion |
| "Lady Killer" | 2008 | 54 | — | 19 | 21 | — | | Passion |
| "Passion" | 2009 | — | — | — | — | — | | Passion |
| "Dust In Gravity" | 2010 | — | — | — | 49 | 1 | | —N/a |
| "Rock Paper Scissors" | 2011 | — | — | — | — | — | | Tropic Electric |
| "I Could Stay" | 2011 | 59 | 39 | 32 | 26 | — | | Tropic Electric |
| "Love Again" | 2012 | 86 | 39 | 45 | 29 | — | | Tropic Electric |
| "Keep Running the Melody" | 2012 | — | — | — | — | — | | Non-album Single |
| "MJ" | 2014 | — | — | — | — | — | | Non-album Single |
| "Sexy Gal" (featuring T.O.K) | 2015 | — | — | — | — | — | | Non-album Single |
| "Reggae Dancer (featuring Shaggy and Costi)" | 2016 | — | — | — | — | — | | Non-album Single |
"—" denotes releases that did not chart

=== Collaborations and features ===
Dust in Gravity (2010) – Delerium featuring Kreesha Turner

Keep Running the Melody (2012) – Wally Lopez featuring Kreesha Turner

Scattin' On Me (2013) – DeStorm Power featuring Kreesha Turner

Fuckin' Wit Me (2013) – DeStorm Power featuring Koowplayy and Kreesha Turner

Champagne Dreams (2015) – Ky-Mani Marley featuring Kreesha Turner

On To You (Remix) (2015) – Marley Waters featuring Kranium, Kreesha Turner and Verse Simmonds

Bring Me Back (2015) – Sultan & Shepard featuring Kreesha Turner

The Youth (2015) - Kay Cola featuring Kreesha Turner and Jon Famous

Ready Fi Di Action (2015) - The Wizard featuring Kreesha Turner

Can't Wait (2016) – Konshens featuring Kreesha Turner

Bombae (2016) – Siya featuring Jake&Papa and Kreesha Turner

Blu Dot (Remix) (2016) - Dott Richey featuring Kreesha Turner

A.N.F.W.M (2016) – Yonni featuring the Game and Kreesha Turner

Blowin' Up (2016) – Yonni featuring Tank (American singer), Eric Bellinger and Kreesha Turner

I Will Be Here (2016) - Precision Productions featuring Kreesha Turner

Showstopper (2017) - KD Soundsystem, the Wizard featuring Kreesha Turner

Good Day (2017) - The Great Escape featuring the Soul Syndicate and Kreesha

Love How You Whine (2017) – K'Coneil featuring Kreesha Turner

Used to (2017) – Collie Buddz featuring Kreesha Turner

Inna Di Club (2019) - DJ Septik featuring Kreesha Turner and Leftside
