= Dancesport World Champions (rhythm) =

World Championships have been held in the Rhythm section of ballroom dancing since they were organised by the National Dance Council of America in 2005.

American Rhythm dancing covers the dances cha cha, rumba, bolero, swing, and mambo.

== World Champions ==
World Professional Rhythm Ballroom Dance / Dancesport Champions
| 2005 | Tony Dovolani & Inna Ivanenko | (United States) U.S.A. |
| 2006 | Tony Dovolani & Elena Grinenko | (United States) U.S.A. |
| 2007-2009 | Jose DeCamps & Joanna Zacharewicz | (United States) U.S.A. |
| 2010-2012 | Decho Kraev & Bree Watson | (United States) U.S.A. |
| 2013-2015 | Emmanuel Pierre-Antoine & Liana Churilova | (United States) U.S.A. |
| 2016-2018 | Nazar Norov & Irina Kudryashova | (United States) U.S.A. |
| 2019 | Andre Paramonov & Natalie Paramonov | (United States) U.S.A. |
| 2020 | Not held due to Covid-19 Pandemic | |
| 2021-2022 | Andre Paramonov & Natalie Paramonov | (United States) U.S.A. |
| 2023-2026 | Francesco Arietta & Jessa Briones | (United States) U.S.A. |

== See also ==
- Smooth World Champions
- Latin World Champions
- Standard World Champions
- U.S. National Dancesport Champions (Professional Rhythm)
- U.S. National Dancesport Champions (Professional 9-Dance)
