= So You Think You Can Dance (American TV series) season 2 =

So You Think You Can Dance
- Season 2
- Hosted by: Cat Deeley
- Judges: Nigel Lythgoe, Mary Murphy, Mia Michaels, Shane Sparks, Dan Karaty, Brian Friedman
- Winner: Benji Schwimmer
- Runner-up: Travis Wall
- Finals venue: CBS Studio Center

Release
- Original network: Fox
- Original release: May 25 – August 16, 2006

Season chronology
- ← Previous; Season 1 Next → Season 3

The second season of So You Think You Can Dance premiered on May 25, 2006, with new host Cat Deeley.

On August 16, Benji Schwimmer was announced as the winner of season 2 and received the grand prize of $100,000, a new hybrid SUV, and a one-year contract with Celine Dion's Las Vegas show, A New Day.... Schwimmer almost did not make the show's top 20 — he was officially first runner-up contestant in case any of the male contestant ran into unforeseen difficulties prior to the start of filming. As it happened, for the second year in a row, Hokuto Konishi was unable to get his visa cleared to work in the U.S. in time for the first taping, and he was cut. Schwimmer took his spot in the Top 20 and fared well from the start, garnering consistent praise from the judges and votes from viewers. Schwimmer and fellow grand finalist Donyelle Jones, who were paired as a couple from the first performance episode, became the fourth contestants in the show's run never to face elimination from being among the bottom six or bottom four contestants, became the second contestants to be in the grand finale, and became the first pair in the show's run never to face elimination from being among the bottom six or bottom four contestants in the grand finale.

== Auditions ==
Auditions were held in New York City; Los Angeles; Chicago; and Charleston, South Carolina.

=== Vegas week ===
One hundred and sixteen contestants were invited for a week of training to the Aladdin hotel (now Planet Hollywood Resort and Casino) in Las Vegas, Nevada. This training included hip-hop choreography taught by Shane Sparks, samba choreography taught by Mary Murphy with assistance from season 1 contestant Artem Chigvintsev, a contemporary routine taught by Mia Michaels, and training from Brian Friedman, who described his choreography as a fusion of jazz and hip-hop. The original group of contestants was eventually whittled down to 41, from which the judges chose their top 20.

| Contestant(s) | Thing/style | Music | Choreographer(s) |
|---|---|---|---|
| All | Hip-hop | "Run It!"—Chris Brown" | Shane Sparks |
| All | Samba | "Magalenha"—Sérgio Mendes | Mary Murphy with Artem Chigvintsev |
| All | Contemporary | N/A | Mia Michaels |
| All | Jazz-fusion | "So Sexy"—Shanice | Brian Friedman |
| All (individual) | Solo | Individual songs chosen by contestant | The contestant |

=== Top 20 Contestants ===
==== Female Contestants ====
| Contestant | Age | Home Town | Dance Style | Elimination date | Placement |
|---|---|---|---|---|---|
| Donyelle Jones† | 26 | Los Angeles, California | Hip Hop/Jazz | August 16, 2006 | 3rd Place |
| Heidi Groskreutz | 24 | Newport Beach, California | Latin/Swing | August 16, 2006 | 4th Place |
| Natalie Fotopoulos | 22 | Tampa, Florida | Jazz | August 3, 2006 | Top 6 |
| Allison Holker | 18 | Orem, Utah | Contemporary | July 27, 2006 | Top 8 |
| Martha Nichols | 19 | Brooklyn, New York | Contemporary | July 20, 2006 | Top 10 |
| Ashlee Nino | 21 | Fort Worth, Texas | Hip Hop | July 13, 2006 | Top 12 |
| Jessica Fernandez | 19 | Miami, Florida | Ballet | July 6, 2006 | Top 14 |
| Aleksandra Wojda | 23 | Pretoria, South Africa | Contemporary | June 29, 2006 | Top 16 |
| Joy Spears | 19 | Killen, Alabama | Contemporary | June 22, 2006 | Top 18 |
| Erin Ellis | 19 | Nashville, Tennessee | Jazz | June 15, 2006 | Top 20 |

==== Male Contestants ====
| Contestant | Age | Home Town | Dance Style | Elimination date | Placement |
|---|---|---|---|---|---|
| Benji Schwimmer | 22 | San Diego, California | Swing | August 16, 2006 | Winner |
| Travis Wall | 18 | Quantico, Virginia | Contemporary | August 16, 2006 | Runner Up |
| Ivan Koumaev | 18 | Seattle, Washington (originally from Russia) | Hip Hop | August 3, 2006 | Top 6 |
| Ryan Rankine | 20 | Brooklyn, New York | Ballet | July 27, 2006 | Top 8 |
| Dmitry Chaplin | 23 | Rostov-on-Don, Russia | Latin Ballroom | July 20, 2006 | Top 10 |
| Musa Cooper | 28 | Camden, New Jersey | Hip Hop | July 13, 2006 | Top 12 |
| Jaymz Tuaileva | 20 | Orem, Utah | Jazz | July 6, 2006 | Top 14 |
| Benjamin “Ben” Susak | 19 | Phoenix, Arizona | Contemporary | June 29, 2006 | Top 16 |
| Jason Williams | 20 | Wilmington, North Carolina | Hip Hop | June 22, 2006 | Top 18 |
| Stanislav Savich | 22 | Brooklyn, New York | Ballroom | June 15, 2006 | Top 20 |

== Studio Shows ==
=== Elimination chart ===
The song played after each female contestant's elimination was "Suddenly I See" by KT Tunstall, whilst that played after each male contestant's elimination was "It's the End of the Road" by Matt Goss.

Legend
| Female | Male | Bottom 3 couples | Bottom 4 contestants |

| Week: | 6/15 | 6/22 | 6/29 | 7/6 | 7/13 | 7/20 | 7/27 | 8/3 | 8/17 |
| Contestant | Result | | | | | | | | |
| Benji Schwimmer | | | | | | | | | Winner |
| Travis Wall | | | | | Btm 3 | | Btm 4 | | Runner-Up |
| Donyelle Jones | | | | | | | | | 3rd Place |
| Heidi Groskreutz | | Btm 3 | | Btm 3 | | | | | 4th Place |
| Ivan Koumaev | Btm 3 | | | Btm 3 | | | | Elim | |
| Natalie Fotopoulos | | | | | Btm 3 | Btm 4 | Btm 4 | Elim | |
| Ryan Rankine | | Btm 3 | | Btm 3 | | Btm 4 | Elim | | |
| Allison Holker | Btm 3 | | | Btm 3 | | | Elim | | |
| Dmitry Chaplin | | Btm 3 | Btm 3 | | Btm 3 | Elim | | | |
| Martha Nichols | | | | | Btm 3 | Elim | | | |
| Musa Cooper | | | | | Elim | | | | |
| Ashlee Nino | | | Btm 3 | | Elim | | | | |
| Jaymz Tuaileva | Btm 3 | | Btm 3 | Elim | | | | | |
| Jessica Fernandez | Btm 3 | | Btm 3 | Elim | | | | | |
| Ben Susak | | | Elim | | | | | | |
| Aleksandra Wodja | | Btm 3 | Elim | | | | | | |
| Jason Williams | | Elim | | | | | | | |
| Joy Spears | | Elim | | | | | | | |
| Stanislav Savich | Elim | | | | | | | | |
| Erin Ellis | Elim | | | | | | | | |

=== Performance nights ===
==== Week 1 (June 14, 2006) ====
Judges: Nigel Lythgoe, Mary Murphy and Dan Karaty

- Couple dances:

| Couple | Style | Music | Choreographer(s) | Result(s) |
|---|---|---|---|---|
| Donyelle Jones; Benji Schwimmer | Hip-Hop | "2 Much Booty (In Da Pants)"—Soundmaster T | Shane Sparks | Safe |
| Allison Holker; Ivan Koumaev | Salsa | "El Temblor"—La Palabra | Alex Da Silva | Bottom 3 |
| Aleksandra Wojda; Jason Williams | Contemporary | "Unwritten"—Natasha Bedingfield | Tyce Diorio | Safe |
| Jessica Fernandez; Jaymz Tuaileva | 70s Disco | "Disco Inferno"—The Trammps | Doriana Sanchez | Bottom 3 |
| Erin Ellis; Stanislav Savich | Paso Doble | "Malaguena"—Manhattan Pops Orchestra | Ron Montez | Both eliminated |
| Joy Spears; Dmitry Chaplin | Hip-Hop | "Hit the Floor"—Twista (ft. Pitbull) | Shane Sparks | Safe |
| Heidi Groskreutz; Ryan Rankine | Viennese Waltz | "Caribbean Blue"—Enya | Ron Montez | Safe |
| Ashlee Nino; Ben Susak | 80s Disco | "Flashdance... What a Feeling"—Irene Cara | Doriana Sanchez | Safe |
| Martha Nichols; Travis Wall | Broadway | "Steam Heat"—The Pointer Sisters | Tyce Diorio | Safe |
| Natalie Fotopoulos; Musa Cooper | Mambo | "Nina"—Joe Cuba Sextet | Alex Da Silva | Safe |

==== Week 2 (June 21, 2006) ====
Judges: Nigel Lythgoe, Shane Sparks and Mia Michaels

- Guest dancer(s): SickStep Crew (now Quest Crew): "Canned Heat"—Jamiroquai (Breakdance)
- Couple dances:

| Couple | Style | Music | Choreographer(s) | Result(s) |
|---|---|---|---|---|
| Martha Nichols; Travis Wall | Krump | "Clap Back"—Ja Rule | Lil' C | Safe |
| Jessica Fernandez; Jaymz Tuaileva | Foxtrot | "Why Don't You Do Right?"—Sinéad O'Connor (incorrectly listed as "Sinead O'Conner") | Mary Murphy | Safe |
| Allison Holker; Ivan Koumaev | Hip-Hop | "Touch It"—Busta Rhymes | Olisa Thompson; Cicely Bradley | Safe |
| Joy Spears; Dmitry Chaplin | Samba | "Mas Que Nada"—Sérgio Mendes feat. The Black Eyed Peas | Mark Weiss | Joy Spears eliminated |
| Natalie Fotopoulos; Musa Cooper | Contemporary | "Closer"—Goapele | Tovaris Wilson | Safe |
| Heidi Groskreutz; Ryan Rankine | Pop | "Walk Away"—Kelly Clarkson | Tovaris Wilson | Bottom 3 |
| Ashlee Nino; Ben Susak | American Jive | "Great Balls of Fire"—Jerry Lee Lewis | Mary Murphy | Safe |
| Aleksandra Wojda; Jason Williams | Hip-Hop | "Wrath of Kane"—Big Daddy Kane | Olisa Thompson; Cicely Bradley | Jason Williams eliminated |
| Donyelle Jones; Benji Schwimmer | Cha-cha | "Cuchi-Cuchi"—Los Amigos Invisibles | Mark Weiss | Safe |

==== Week 3 (June 28, 2006) ====
Judges: Nigel Lythgoe, Mary Murphy, Olisa Thompson and Cicely Bradley

- Guest dancer(s): Hop, Swing and a Jump: "Traffic Jam"—Bill Elliott (Lindy Hop)
- Couple dances:

| Couple | Style | Music | Choreographer(s) | Result(s) |
|---|---|---|---|---|
| Ashlee Nino; Ben Susak | Hip-Hop | "Caught Up"—Usher | Todd Sams | Ben Susak eliminated |
| Heidi Groskreutz; Ryan Rankine | Cuban Rumba | "Rumba del Solar"—Angelo Rodriguez | Alex Da Silva | Safe |
| Aleksandra Wojda; Dmitry Chaplin | Waltz | "If I Were a Painting"—Kenny Rogers | Heather Smith | Aleksandra Wojda eliminated |
| Allison Holker; Ivan Koumaev | Argentine Tango | "Libertango"—bond | Alex Da Silva | Safe |
| Donyelle Jones; Benji Schwimmer | Pop-Jazz | "Put the Needle on It"—Dannii Minogue | Brian Friedman | Safe |
| Natalie Fotopoulos; Musa Cooper | Quickstep | "Zoot Suit Riot"—Cherry Poppin' Daddies | Heather Smith | Safe |
| Jessica Fernandez; Jaymz Tuaileva | Contemporary | "Let Go"—Frou Frou | Brian Friedman | Bottom 3 |
| Martha Nichols; Travis Wall | Hip-Hop | "Just Fine"—Chris Brown | Todd Sams | Safe |

==== Week 4 (July 5, 2006) ====
Judges: Nigel Lythgoe, Mary Murphy and Dan Karaty

- Guest dancer(s): Lil' C and the Neph Squad: "Spaz Meter"—The J-Squad (Krump)
- Couple dances:

| Couple | Style | Music | Choreographer(s) | Result(s) |
|---|---|---|---|---|
| Heidi Groskreutz; Ryan Rankine | Hip-Hop | "Give It All You Got"—Afro-Rican | Shane Sparks | Bottom 3 |
| Martha Nichols; Travis Wall | Salsa | "Tanga"—Machito and His Afro-Cubans | Ron Montez | Safe |
| Ashlee Nino; Dmitry Chaplin | Contemporary | "Dance, Dance"—Fall Out Boy | Brian Friedman | Safe |
| Natalie Fotopoulos; Musa Cooper | Disco | "Hot Stuff"—Donna Summer | Doriana Sanchez | Safe |
| Donyelle Jones; Benji Schwimmer | Viennese Waltz | "Have You Ever Really Loved a Woman?"—Bryan Adams | Toni Redpath; Michael Mead | Safe |
| Allison Holker; Ivan Koumaev | West Coast Swing | "Don't Happen No More"—Pat Benatar | Ron Montez | Bottom 3 |
| Jessica Fernandez; Jaymz Tuaileva | Hip-Hop | "I Can Make You Dance"—Zapp | Shane Sparks | Both eliminated |

==== Week 5 (July 12, 2006) ====
Judges: Nigel Lythgoe, Mary Murphy and Brian Friedman

- Couple dances:

| Couple | Style | Music | Choreographer(s) | Result(s) |
|---|---|---|---|---|
| Musa Cooper; Natalie Fotopoulos | Hip-Hop | "Promiscuous"—Nelly Furtado (ft. Timbaland) | Dan Karaty | Musa Cooper eliminated |
| Ryan Rankine; Heidi Groskreutz | Cha-cha | "Sex Bomb"—Tom Jones | Jean-Marc Généreux | Safe |
| Ivan Koumaev; Allison Holker | Contemporary | "Why"—Annie Lennox | Tyce Diorio | Safe |
| Dmitry Chaplin; Ashlee Nino | Pop | "Let Me"—Rihanna | Dan Karaty | Ashlee Nino eliminated |
| Travis Wall; Martha Nichols | Foxtrot | "Witchcraft"—Steve Tyrell | Jean-Marc Généreux | Bottom 3 |
| Benji Schwimmer; Donyelle Jones | Broadway | "You Can't Stop The Beat" from Hairspray | Tyce Diorio | Safe |

==== Week 6 (July 19, 2006) ====
Judges: Nigel Lythgoe, Olisa Thompson, Cicely Bradley and Jean-Marc Généreux

- Couple dances:

| Couple | Style | Music | Choreographer(s) | Result(s) |
|---|---|---|---|---|
| Martha Nichols; Ivan Koumaev | Hip-Hop | "Me & U"—Cassie | Shane Sparks | Martha Nichols eliminated |
| Martha Nichols; Ivan Koumaev | Smooth Waltz | "Sandy's Song"—Dolly Parton | Toni Redpath; Michael Mead | Martha Nichols eliminated |
| Heidi Groskreutz; Travis Wall | Paso Doble | "The Plaza of Execution" from The Mask of Zorro | Mary Murphy | Safe |
| Heidi Groskreutz; Travis Wall | Contemporary | "Calling You"—Celine Dion | Mia Michaels | Safe |
| Allison Holker; Ryan Rankine | Contemporary | "Ethna"—Klement Bonelli | Mia Michaels | Ryan Rankine in bottom 4 |
| Allison Holker; Ryan Rankine | Broadway | "Bye Bye Blackbird"—Liza Minnelli | Tyce Diorio | Ryan Rankine in bottom 4 |
| Donyelle Jones; Dmitry Chaplin | Lindy Hop | "Sing, Sing, Sing"-Benny Goodman | Nick Williams; Kristen Sorci | Dmitry Chaplin eliminated |
| Donyelle Jones; Dmitry Chaplin | Samba | "Hey Mama"—The Black Eyed Peas | Mary Murphy Artem Chigvintsev (season 1) assisting | Dmitry Chaplin eliminated |
| Natalie Fotopoulos; Benji Schwimmer | Jazz | "Wonderful"—India.Arie | Tyce Diorio | Natalie Fotopoulos in bottom 4 |
| Natalie Fotopoulos; Benji Schwimmer | Hip-Hop | "She's Freaky"—Pitbull | Shane Sparks | Natalie Fotopoulos in bottom 4 |

- Top 10 contestant's solos:

| Contestant | Style | Music | Result |
|---|---|---|---|
| Donyelle Jones | Hip-Hop | "Git It"—Bun B feat. Ying Yang Twins | Safe |
| Dmitry Chaplin | Samba | "Pump It"—Black Eyed Peas | Eliminated |
| Martha Nichols | Jazz | "What You Waiting For?"—Gwen Stefani | Eliminated |
| Ivan Koumaev | Hip-Hop | "This Luv"—Donell Jones | Safe |
| Heidi Groskreutz | Samba | "Dum Diddly"—Black Eyed Peas | Safe |
| Travis Wall | Contemporary | "Belief"—Gavin DeGraw | Safe |
| Natalie Fotopoulos | Contemporary | "Lamentation"—Leah Andreone | Bottom 4 |
| Benji Schwimmer | West Coast Swing | "Land of a Thousand Dances"—Wilson Pickett | Safe |
| Allison Holker | Contemporary | "We Belong"—Pat Benatar | Safe |
| Ryan Rankine | Jazz | "Canned Heat"—Jamiroquai | Bottom 4 |

==== Week 7 (July 26, 2006) ====
Judges: Nigel Lythgoe, Mary Murphy and Dan Karaty

- Couple dances:

| Couple | Style | Music | Choreographer(s) | Result(s) |
|---|---|---|---|---|
| Donyelle Jones; Travis Wall | Hip-Hop | "London Bridge"—Fergie | Shane Sparks | Travis Wall in bottom 4 |
| Donyelle Jones; Travis Wall | Quickstep | "Dancin' Fool"—Barry Manilow | Glenn Weiss | Travis Wall in bottom 4 |
| Allison Holker; Ivan Koumaev | Argentine Tango | "La Cumparsita"—Orquestra Escuela de Tango | Alex Da Silva | Allison Holker eliminated |
| Allison Holker; Ivan Koumaev | Hip-Hop | "Sexy Love"—Ne-Yo | Shane Sparks | Allison Holker eliminated |
| Natalie Fotopoulos; Ryan Rankine | Disco | "Turn the Beat Around"—Vicki Sue Robinson | Doriana Sanchez | Natalie Fotopoulos in bottom 4 Ryan Rankine eliminated |
| Natalie Fotopoulos; Ryan Rankine | Contemporary | "I Will Get There"—Boyz II Men | Tyce Diorio | Natalie Fotopoulos in bottom 4 Ryan Rankine eliminated |
| Heidi Groskreutz; Benji Schwimmer | Broadway | "Fake Your Way to the Top" from Dreamgirls | Tyce Diorio | Safe |
| Heidi Groskreutz; Benji Schwimmer | Mambo | "Black Mambo"—Angel and the Mambokats | Alex Da Silva | Safe |

==== Week 8 (August 2, 2006) ====
Judges: Nigel Lythgoe, Mary Murphy and Mia Michaels

- Couple dances:

| Couple | Style | Music | Choreographer(s) | Result(s) |
|---|---|---|---|---|
| Natalie Fotopoulos; Ivan Koumaev | Jive | "Route 66"—John Mayer | Ron Montez | Both eliminated |
| Natalie Fotopoulos; Ivan Koumaev | Contemporary | "Everytime We Touch (Yanou's Candlelight Mix)"—Cascada | Tyce Diorio | Both eliminated |
| Donyelle Jones; Benji Schwimmer | Broadway | "Le Jazz Hot"—Julie Andrews | Tyce Diorio | Safe |
| Donyelle Jones; Benji Schwimmer | Hip-Hop | "Hotline"—Ciara | Shane Sparks | Safe |
| Heidi Groskreutz; Travis Wall | Smooth Waltz | "Flying"—Cait Agus Sean | Ron Montez | Safe |
| Heidi Groskreutz; Travis Wall | Afro-Pop | "W'Happy Mama"—Zap Mama | Wade Robson | Safe |

- Top 6 contestant's solos:

| Contestant | Style | Music | Result |
|---|---|---|---|
| Travis Wall | Contemporary | "You and Me"—Lifehouse | Safe |
| Natalie Fotopoulos | Jazz | "Ooh La La"—Goldfrapp | Eliminated |
| Ivan Koumaev | Hip-Hop | "It Was All In Your Mind"—Wade Robson | Eliminated |
| Heidi Groskreutz | Cha-cha | "I Like It"—The Blackout Allstars | Safe |
| Benji Schwimmer | West Coast Swing | "Reet Petite"—Jackie Wilson | Safe |
| Donyelle Jones | Broadway | "And I Am Telling You I'm Not Going" from Dreamgirls | Safe |

==== Week 9 (August 9, 2006) ====
Judges: Nigel Lythgoe, Mary Murphy and Brian Friedman

- Group dance: Top 4: "SexyBack"—Justin Timberlake (Pop; Choreographer: Wade Robson)
- Duo dances:

| Couple | Style | Music | Choreographer(s) |
|---|---|---|---|
| Heidi Groskreutz; Travis Wall | Disco | "Shake Your Groove Thing"—Peaches & Herb | Doriana Sanchez |
| Donyelle Jones; Benji Schwimmer | Viennese Waltz | "I'll Be"—Edwin McCain | Jean-Marc Généreux |
| Travis Wall; Benji Schwimmer | Hip-Hop | "Gyrate"—Da Muzicianz feat. Mr. Collipark | Shane Sparks |
| Donyelle Jones; Heidi Groskreutz | Broadway | "Big Spender" from Sweet Charity | Tyce Diorio; Lauren Gottlieb (season 3) assisting |
| Donyelle Jones; Travis Wall | Contemporary | "Georgia on My Mind"—Ray Charles | Mia Michaels |
| Heidi Groskreutz; Benji Schwimmer | Salsa | "La Comay"—Sonora Carruseles | Alex Da Silva |

Top 4 contestant's solos:

| Contestant | Style | Music |
|---|---|---|
| Heidi Groskreutz | Cha-cha | "Rie y Llora"—Celia Cruz |
| Donyelle Jones | Contemporary | "Human"—Dionne Farris |
| Travis Wall | Contemporary | "Konstantine"—Something Corporate |
| Benji Schwimmer | West Coast Swing | "The House Is Rockin'"—The Brian Setzer Orchestra |

=== Results shows ===
==== Week 1 (June 15, 2006) ====
- Group dance: Top 20: "Technologic"—Daft Punk (Pop-Jazz; Choreographer: Brian Friedman)
- Musical guest: "Promiscuous"—Nelly Furtado feat. Timbaland
- Guest dancer(s): Nick Lazzarini: "Pardon Me"—Incubus (Contemporary)
- Bottom 3 couple’s solos:

| Contestant | Style | Music | Result |
|---|---|---|---|
| Erin Ellis | Contemporary | "Gotta Get Thru This"—Daniel Bedingfield | Eliminated |
| Stanislav Savich | Cha-cha | "Shing A-Tin Tin"—Tito Puente | Eliminated |
| Allison Holker | Contemporary | "Wild Horses"—Natasha Bedingfield | Safe |
| Ivan Koumaev | Hip-Hop | "Ready"—Black Rob | Safe |
| Jessica Fernandez | Ballet | "Dancing"—Elisa | Safe |
| Jaymz Tuaileva | Jazz | "All That I've Got"—The Used | Safe |

- Eliminated:
  - Erin Ellis
  - Stanislav Savich
- New Pairs:
  - None

==== Week 2 (June 22, 2006) ====
- Group dance: Top 18: "Get Up Offa That Thing"—James Brown (Funk; Choreographer: Dan Karaty)
- Musical guest: "SOS"—Rihanna
- Bottom 3 couple’s solos:

| Contestant | Style | Music | Result |
|---|---|---|---|
| Joy Spears | Contemporary | "Look At Me"—Keri Noble | Eliminated |
| Dmitry Chaplin | Paso Doble | "Plaza of Execution"—James Horner | Safe |
| Heidi Groskreutz | Cha-cha | "I Like It (Radio Mix)"—Tito Nieves | Safe |
| Ryan Rankine | Contemporary | "Ain't No Way"—Chris Brown | Safe |
| Aleksandra Wojda | Contemporary | "Breathe Me"—Sia | Safe |
| Jason Williams | Hip-Hop | "So Sexy"—Shanice | Eliminated |

- Eliminated:
  - Joy Spears
  - Jason Williams
- New Pairs:
  - Aleksandra Wojda and Dmitry Chaplin

==== Week 3 (June 29, 2006) ====
- Group dance: Top 16: "Poison"—Bell Biv DeVoe (Hip-Hop; Choreographer: Shane Sparks)
- Musical guest: "Single"—Natasha Bedingfield
- Bottom 3 couple’s solos:

| Contestant | Style | Music | Result |
|---|---|---|---|
| Ashlee Nino | Popping | "She's a Bad Mama Jama"—Carl Carlton | Safe |
| Ben Susak | Contemporary | "Everything"—Lifehouse | Eliminated |
| Jessica Fernandez | Jazz | "Fever"—Michael Bublé | Safe |
| Jaymz Tuaileva | Jazz | "Only One"—Yellowcard | Safe |
| Aleksandra Wojda | Contemporary | "Insensible"—Mandalay | Eliminated |
| Dmitry Chaplin | Samba | "Magalenha"—Sérgio Mendes | Safe |

- Eliminated:
  - Aleksandra Wojda
  - Ben Susak
- New Pairs:
  - Ashlee Nino and Dmitry Chaplin

==== Week 4 (July 6, 2006) ====
- Group dance: Top 14: "Footloose" from Footloose (Jive; Choreographer: Mary Murphy)
- Musical guest: "Sexy Love"—Ne-Yo
- Bottom 3 couples' solos:

| Contestant | Style | Music | Result |
|---|---|---|---|
| Jessica Fernandez | Jazz | "Body Language"—Queen | Eliminated |
| Jaymz Tuaileva | Paso Doble | "The Plaza of Execution"—James Horner | Eliminated |
| Heidi Groskreutz | Jive | "Proud Mary"—Ike and Tina Turner | Safe |
| Ryan Rankine | Contemporary | "Love"—Musiq Soulchild | Safe |
| Allison Holker | Contemporary | "Bitter"—Me'shell Ndegeocello | Safe |
| Ivan Koumaev | Hip-Hop | "Let Me Love You"—Mario | Safe |

- Eliminated:
  - Jessica Fernandez
  - Jaymz Tuaileva
- New Pairs:
  - None

==== Week 5 (July 13, 2006) ====
- Group dance: Top 12: "Born to be Alive"—Patrick Hernandez (Disco; Choreographer: Doriana Sanchez)
- Musical guest: "Buttons"—The Pussycat Dolls
- Bottom 3 couples' solos:

| Contestant | Style | Music | Result |
|---|---|---|---|
| Ashlee Nino | Popping | "We Don't Play"—Lil Rob | Eliminated |
| Dmitry Chaplin | Jive | "Jailhouse Rock"—Elvis Presley | Safe |
| Martha Nichols | Contemporary | "Still"—Jodie Manross | Safe |
| Travis Wall | Contemporary | "The Blower's Daughter"—Damien Rice | Safe |
| Natalie Fotopoulos | Jazz | "Some Girls"—Rachel Stevens | Safe |
| Musa Cooper | Breakdance | "Disco Inferno"—The Trammps | Eliminated |

- Eliminated:
  - Ashlee Nino
  - Musa Cooper
- New Pairs:
  - None : now that it was down to the top 10, pairs were randomly picked and viewers got to vote on individual contestants.

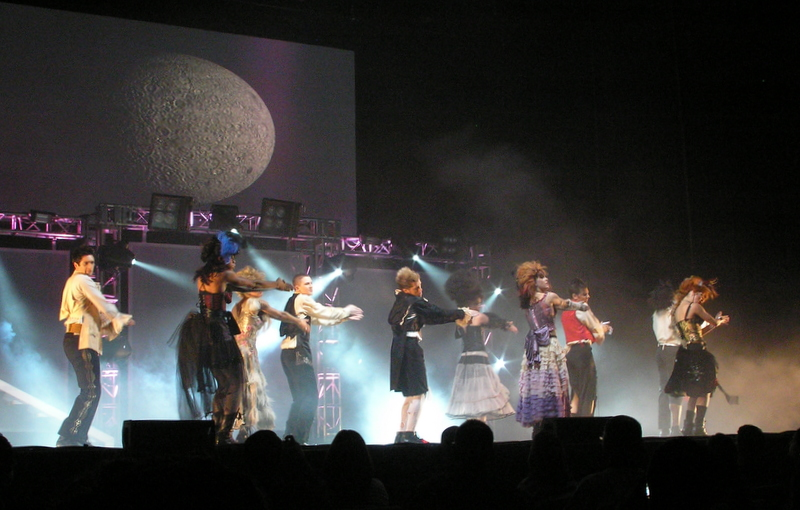
Top 10 contestants from So You Think You Can Dance performing a zombie dance to Róisín Murphy's "Ramalama (Bang Bang)" in Buffalo, New York

==== Week 6 (July 20, 2006) ====
- Note: This week, the contestants performed the same solo twice
- Group dance: Top 10: "Ramalama (Bang Bang)"—Róisín Murphy (Pop-Jazz; Choreographer: Wade Robson)
- Musical guest: "Gimme That"—Chris Brown
- Bottom 4 contestants:
  - Dmitry Chaplin
  - Natalie Fotopoulos
  - Martha Nichols
  - Ryan Rankine
- Eliminated:
  - Martha Nichols
  - Dmitry Chaplin

==== Week 7 (July 27, 2006) ====
- Group dance: Top 8: "Cell Block Tango" from Chicago (musical) (Broadway; Choreographer: Tyce Diorio)
- Musical guest: A medley of "Touch It", "I Love My Chick", and "In the Ghetto"—Busta Rhymes
- Bottom 4 contestant's solos:

| Contestant | Style | Music | Result |
|---|---|---|---|
| Natalie Fotopoulos | Jazz | "Veins"—Charlotte Martin | Safe |
| Ryan Rankine | Contemporary | "Just Fine"—Chris Brown | Eliminated |
| Allison Holker | Jazz | "Feeling Good"—Michael Bublé | Eliminated |
| Travis Wall | Contemporary | "Gotta Get Thru This (Acoustic)"—Daniel Bedingfield | Safe |

- Eliminated:
  - Allison Holker
  - Ryan Rankine

==== Week 8 (August 3, 2006) ====
- Group dance: "Hide and Seek"—Imogen Heap (Contemporary; Choreographer: Mia Michaels)
- Musical Guest: "Entourage"—Omarion
- Top 6 contestant's solos:
  - Natalie Fotopoulos: "I Would Die for You"—Jann Arden
  - Heidi Groskreutz: "Hey Mama"—The Black Eyed Peas
  - Donyelle Jones: "Buttons"—The Pussycat Dolls
  - Travis Wall: "Flying Without Wings (A Capella version)"—Westlife
  - Ivan Koumaev: "I Question Mark"—Wade Robson
  - Benji Schwimmer: "Brown Derby Jump"—Cherry Poppin' Daddies
- Eliminated:
  - Natalie Fotopoulos
  - Ivan Koumaev

==== Week 10 (Finale) (August 16, 2006) ====
- Judges: Nigel Lythgoe, Mary Murphy, Brian Friedman, Shane Sparks, Mia Michaels, Dan Karaty
- Musical guests:
  - "Get Up"—Ciara
  - "London Bridge"—Fergie
- Special guest: Celine Dion, who appeared via videotape to congratulate the winner
- Group dances:
  - Top 20
    - "When You Gonna Give It Up To Me"—Sean Paul (ft. Keyshia Cole) (Choreographer: Shane Sparks)
    - "Ramalama (Bang Bang)"—Róisín Murphy (Choreographer: Wade Robson)
  - Top 10
    - "Cell Block Tango" from Chicago (Choreographer: Tyce Diorio)
- Grand finalists' choice: (each of the top four chose to reprise their favorite routine)
  - Benji Schwimmer: Mambo with Heidi Groskreutz ("Black Mambo"—Angel and the Mambokats)
  - Heidi Groskreutz: Contemporary with Travis Wall ("Calling You"—Celine Dion)
  - Donyelle Jones: Broadway with Benji Schwimmer ("You Can't Stop the Beat" from Hairspray)
  - Travis Wall: Paso doble with Heidi Groskreutz ("The Plaza of Execution" from The Mask of Zorro)
- Judges' choice: (four of the judges picked their favorite routine)
  - Mary Murphy: Samba with Dmitry Chaplin and Natalie Fotopoulos ("Magalenha"—Sérgio Mendes)
  - Mia Michaels: Contemporary with Allison Holker and Ivan Koumaev ("Why"—Annie Lennox)
  - Brian Friedman: Broadway with Travis Wall and Martha Nichols ("Steam Heat"—The Pointer Sisters)
  - Dan Karaty: Hip-hop with Travis Wall and Benji Schwimmer ("Gyrate"—Da Muzicianz (ft. Mr. Collipark))
- Solos:
  - Heidi Groskreutz: "I Love Rock 'n' Roll"—Joan Jett
  - Donyelle Jones: "I'm Free"—Amber
  - Benji Schwimmer: "Never Knew"—The Rocket Summer
  - Travis Wall: "Wonderful"—Annie Lennox
- 4th Place
  - Heidi Groskreutz
- 3rd Place
  - Donyelle Jones
- Runner-Up:
  - Travis Wall
- Winner:
  - Benji Schwimmer

== Live tour ==
In 2006, the top 10 contestants went on a performance tour (which is the first sytycd tour). Tickets went on sale August 12

== Awards ==
=== 2007 Emmy Awards ===
| Result | Category | Recipient(s)/ Choreographer(s) | Performers | Music |
|---|---|---|---|---|
| Won^{†} | Outstanding Choreography | Wade Robson | Top 10 contestants | "Ramalama (Bang Bang)"—Róisín Murphy |
| Won^{†} | Outstanding Choreography | Mia Michaels | Heidi Groskreutz; Travis Wall | "Calling You"—Celine Dion |

^{†} Wade Robson and Mia Michaels were joint-winners along with Rob Marshall and John Deluca from Tony Bennett: An American Classic.

== Ratings ==
=== U.S. Nielsen ratings ===
| Show | Episode | First air date | Rating (18–49) | Share (18–49) | Viewers (millions) | Rank (timeslot) | Rank (night) |
|---|---|---|---|---|---|---|---|
| 1 | Auditions #1 & #2: New York and Chicago | May 25, 2006 | 6.9 | 12 | 10.7 | 1 | 3 |
| 2 | Auditions #3: Los Angeles | May 31, 2006 | 5.6 | 9 | 8.8 | 3 | 6 |
| 3 | Auditions #4: Chicago | June 1, 2006 | 6.3 | 10 | 10.0 | 2 | 3 |
| 4 | Las Vegas Callback #1 | June 7, 2006 | 6.7 | 11 | 10.7 | 1 | 1 |
| 5 | Las Vegas Callback #2 | June 8, 2006 | 6.3 | 10 | 10.2 | 3 | 4 |
| 6 | Top 20 Perform | June 14, 2006 | 6.6 | 12 | 9.9 | 1 | 1 |
| 7 | 2 of 20 Voted Off Live | June 15, 2006 | 5.2 | 9 | 8.2 | 4 | 6 |
| 8 | Top 18 Perform | June 21, 2006 | 5.9 | 10 | 9.1 | 1 | 3 |
| 9 | 2 of 18 Voted Off | June 22, 2006 | 5.7 | 10 | 9.3 | 2 | 3 |
| 10 | Top 16 Perform | June 28, 2006 | 5.8 | 10 | 8.8 | 1 | 4 |
| 11 | 2 of 16 Voted Off | June 29, 2006 | 5.5 | 10 | 8.5 | 2 | 3 |
| 12 | Top 14 Perform | July 5, 2006 | 5.4 | 10 | 8.5 (Note: Nielsen split this episode into two, so a combined average is displayed here. The first half gained 7.2 million viewers with a 4.6/9 rating/share, ranked number 1 in the timeslot and number 5 for the night. The second half, which aired at 8:30 pm, gained 9.8 million viewers with a 6.1/10 rating/share, ranked number 1 in the timeslot and number 2 for the night.) | 1 | 4 |
| 13 | 2 of 14 Voted Off | July 6, 2006 | 5.4 | 9 | 8.8 | 1 | 3 |
| 14 | Top 12 Perform | July 12, 2006 | 6.0 | 10 | 9.6 | 1 | 3 |
| 15 | 2 of 12 Voted Off Live | July 13, 2006 | 6.0 | 10 | 9.3 | 2 | 3 |
| 16 | Top 10 Perform | July 19, 2006 | 5.5 | 10 | 8.7 (Note: Nielsen split this episode into two, so a combined average is displayed here. The first half gained 7.7 million viewers with a 4.9/9 rating/share, ranked number 2 in the timeslot and number 5 for the night. The second half, which aired at 9 pm, gained 9.6 million viewers with a 6.0/10 rating/share, ranked number 1 in the timeslot and number 3 for the night.) | 2 | 3 |
| 17 | 2 of 10 Voted Off Live | July 20, 2006 | 5.5 | 9 | 8.6 | 2 | 3 |
| 18 | Top 8 Perform | July 26, 2006 | 5.8 | 10 | 9.2 | 1 (tied) | 3 (tied) |
| 19 | 2 of 8 Voted Off | July 27, 2006 | 5.3 | 9 | 8.4 | 2 | 3 |
| 20 | Top 6 Perform | August 2, 2006 | 6.0 | 10 | 9.4 | 1 | 2 |
| 21 | 2 of 6 Voted Off Live | August 3, 2006 | 5.3 | 9 | 8.4 | 2 | 3 |
| 22 | Top 4 Perform | August 9, 2006 | 6.4 | 10 | 10.1 | 1 | 1 |
| 23 | Finals/Winner | August 16, 2006 | 6.0 | 10 | 9.4 (Note: Nielsen split this episode into two, so a combined average is displayed here. The first half gained 8.0 million viewers with a 5.2/9 rating/share, ranked number 2 in the timeslot and number 5 for the night. The second half, which aired at 9 pm, gained 10.7 million viewers with a 6.7/11 rating/share, ranked number 1 in the timeslot and number 2 for the night.) | 2 | 2 |

== See also ==
- List of So You Think You Can Dance finalists
