= Dancing with the Stars (American TV series) season 6 =

Dancing with the Stars
- Season 6
- Promotional poster, featuring former pro dancers Edyta Śliwińska and Alec Mazo
- Hosted by: Tom Bergeron; Samantha Harris
- Judges: Carrie Ann Inaba; Len Goodman; Bruno Tonioli
- Celebrity winner: Kristi Yamaguchi
- Professional winner: Mark Ballas
- No. of episodes: 20

Release
- Original network: ABC
- Original release: March 17 – May 20, 2008

Season chronology
- ← Previous; Season 5 Next → Season 7

Season six of Dancing with the Stars premiered on March 17, 2008.

On May 6, Dancing with the Stars had a special two-hour episode to commemorate its 100th episode.

Olympic figure skater Kristi Yamaguchi and Mark Ballas won the competition, while Miami Dolphins defensive end Jason Taylor and Edyta Śliwińska finished in second place, and actor Cristián de la Fuente and Cheryl Burke finished in third.

== Cast ==
=== Couples ===
This season featured twelve celebrity contestants. The contestants were announced during the season finale of Dance War: Bruno vs. Carrie Ann by season two contestants Lisa Rinna, Jerry Rice, and Kenny Mayne.

Celebrity	Notability	Professional partner	Status
Penn Jillette	Magician	Kym Johnson	Eliminated 1st on March 25, 2008
Monica Seles	Professional tennis player	Jonathan Roberts	Eliminated 2nd on March 25, 2008
Steve Guttenberg	Film actor	Anna Trebunskaya	Eliminated 3rd on April 1, 2008
Adam Carolla	Comedian & radio host	Julianne Hough	Eliminated 4th on April 8, 2008
Priscilla Presley	Actress & businesswoman	Louis van Amstel	Eliminated 5th on April 15, 2008
Marlee Matlin	Film & television actress	Fabian Sanchez	Eliminated 6th on April 22, 2008
Shannon Elizabeth	American Pie actress	Derek Hough	Eliminated 7th on April 29, 2008
Mario	R&B singer	Karina Smirnoff	Eliminated 8th on May 6, 2008
Marissa Jaret Winokur	Broadway actress	Tony Dovolani	Eliminated 9th on May 13, 2008
Cristián de la Fuente	Film & television actor	Cheryl Burke	Third place on May 19, 2008
Jason Taylor	NFL defensive end	Edyta Śliwińska	Runners-up on May 20, 2008
Kristi Yamaguchi	Olympic figure skater	Mark Ballas	Winners on May 20, 2008

=== Hosts and judges ===
Tom Bergeron and Samantha Harris returned as co-hosts, while Carrie Ann Inaba, Len Goodman, and Bruno Tonioli returned as judges.

== Episodes ==
No. overall	No. in season	Title	Rating (18–49)	Original release date	U.S. viewers (millions)
85	1	"Round 1: Part 1"	5.6/15	March 17, 2008	21.15
86	2	"Round 1: Part 2"	4.1/10	March 18, 2008	17.02
87	3	"Round 1: Part 3"	5.1/13	March 24, 2008	20.51
88	4	"Round Results"	3.9/9	March 25, 2008	17.49
89	5	"Round 2"	5.1/13	March 31, 2008	20.56
90	6	"Round 2 Results"	4.0/10	April 1, 2008	17.28
91	7	"Round 3"	4.9/13	April 7, 2008	19.68
92	8	"Round 3 Results"	3.6/9	April 8, 2008	17.02
93	9	"Round 4"	4.1/11	April 14, 2008	17.20
94	10	"Round 4 Results"	3.6/9	April 15, 2008	15.42
95	11	"Round 5"	4.3/11	April 21, 2008	18.04
96	12	"Round 5 Results"	4.2/10	April 22, 2008	17.97
97	13	"Round 6"	4.5/11	April 28, 2008	18.22
98	14	"Round 6 Results"	4.1/10	April 29, 2008	17.06
99	15	"Round 7"	4.3/12	May 5, 2008	18.10
100	16	"Round 7 Results"	4.4/11	May 6, 2008	18.38
101	17	"Round 8"	4.2/11	May 12, 2008	18.47
102	18	"Round 8 Results"	4.1/10	May 13, 2008	16.99
103	19	"Round 9"	4.4/13	May 19, 2008	19.22
104	20	"Round 9 Results"	5.4/14	May 20, 2008	20.12

== Scoring chart ==
The highest score each week is indicated in bold green with a dagger (†), while the lowest score each week is indicated in italicized red with a double-dagger (‡).

Color key:

Winners
Runners-up
Third place
Bottom two
Eliminated

Dancing with the Stars (season 6) - Weekly scores
Couple	Pl.	Week											
Couple	Pl.	1	2	1+2	3	4	5	6	7	8	9	10	
Couple	Pl.	1	2	1+2	3	4	5	6	7	8	9	Night 1	Night 2
Kristi & Mark	1st	**27**†	**27**†	**54**†	**27**†	**29**†	**29**†	**30**†	26+28=54	29+26=55	29+28=**57**†	30+30=**60**†	+30=**90**† (Note: This couple finished in first place.)
Jason & Edyta	2nd	22	**27**†	49	23	**29**†	27	24	29+26=**55**†	29+23=52	28+27=55	24+27=51‡	+30=81‡ (Note: This couple finished in second place.)
Cristián & Cheryl	3rd	21	20	41	25	26	23 (Note: This couple was in the bottom two, but was not eliminated.)	27	25+21=46‡	28+29=**57**†	27+29=56	26+26=52 (Note: This couple finished in third place.)	
Marissa & Tony	4th	18	21	39	19‡	24	24	26	27+25=52	25+25=50‡	26+26=52‡ (Note: This couple was eliminated.)		
Mario & Karina	5th	24	26	50	21	24	27	28	24+27=51	27+26=53			
Shannon & Derek	6th	21	24	45	24	28	23	24	27+24=51				
Marlee & Fabian	7th	22	24	46	21	24	22	21‡					
Priscilla & Louis	8th	24	21	45	26	22	21‡						
Adam & Julianne	9th	15‡	19	34	21	19‡							
Steve & Anna	10th	18	16	34	21								
Monica & Jonathan	11th	15‡	15‡	30‡									
Penn & Kym	12th	16	17	33									

== Weekly scores ==
Individual judges' scores in the charts below (given in parentheses) are listed in this order from left to right: Carrie Ann Inaba, Len Goodman, Bruno Tonioli.

=== Week 1 ===
Each couple performed either the cha-cha-cha or the foxtrot. The men performed on the first night and the women on the second. Couples are listed in the order they performed.

Night 1 (Men)

Couple	Scores	Dance	Music
Penn & Kym	16 (5, 6, 5)	Cha-cha-cha	"Fool in Love" — Tina Turner
Jason & Edyta	22 (7, 8, 7)	Foxtrot	"Pride and Joy" — Marvin Gaye
Cristián & Cheryl	21 (7, 7, 7)	Cha-cha-cha	"Bang Bang" — David Sanborn
Adam & Julianne	15 (5, 5, 5)	Foxtrot	"Mellow Yellow" — Donovan
Mario & Karina	24 (8, 8, 8)	Cha-cha-cha	"Request Line" — The Black Eyed Peas
Steve & Anna	18 (6, 6, 6)	Foxtrot	"Lazy River" — Bobby Darin

Night 2 (Women)

Couple	Scores	Dance	Music
Shannon & Derek	21 (7, 7, 7)	Cha-cha-cha	"Shut Up and Drive" — Rihanna
Monica & Jonathan	15 (5, 5, 5)	Foxtrot	"Bubbly" — Colbie Caillat
Marissa & Tony	18 (6, 6, 6)	Cha-cha-cha	"Low" — Flo Rida, feat. T-Pain
Priscilla & Louis	24 (8, 8, 8)	Foxtrot	"Feeling Good" — Nina Simone
Kristi & Mark	27 (9, 9, 9)	Foxtrot	"The More I See You" — Michael Bublé
Marlee & Fabian	22 (7, 7, 8)	Cha-cha-cha	"Get on Your Feet" — Gloria Estefan

=== Week 2 ===
Each couple performed either the mambo or the quickstep. Two couples were eliminated at the end of the night. Couples are listed in the order they performed.

Couple	Scores	Dance	Music	Result
Steve & Anna	16 (6, 5, 5)	Mambo	"I Got a Girl" — Lou Bega	Safe
Cristián & Cheryl	20 (7, 6, 7)	Quickstep	"Americano" — The Brian Setzer Orchestra	Safe
Monica & Jonathan	15 (5, 5, 5)	Mambo	"My Lovin' (You're Never Gonna Get It)" — En Vogue	Eliminated
Penn & Kym	17 (6, 6, 5)	Quickstep	"Man with the Hex" — Atomic Fireballs	Eliminated
Priscilla & Louis	21 (7, 7, 7)	Mambo	"Bossa Nova Hand Dance (Deixa isso prà là)" — Connie Francis	Safe
Shannon & Derek	24 (8, 8, 8)	Quickstep	"Swing with Me" — Jessica Simpson	Safe
Jason & Edyta	27 (9, 9, 9)	Mambo	"Lupita" — Perez Prado	Safe
Marissa & Tony	21 (7, 7, 7)	Quickstep	"Flip, Flop and Fly" — The Blues Brothers	Safe
Adam & Julianne	19 (6, 7, 6)	Mambo	"House of Bamboo" — Andy Williams	Safe
Marlee & Fabian	24 (8, 8, 8)	Quickstep	"Mack the Knife" — Ella Fitzgerald	Safe
Kristi & Mark	27 (9, 9, 9)	Mambo	"Hey Baby" — No Doubt, featuring Bounty Killer	Safe
Mario & Karina	26 (9, 8, 9)	Quickstep	"Valerie" — Amy Winehouse	Safe

=== Week 3 ===
Each couple performed either the jive or the tango. Couples are listed in the order they performed.

Couple	Scores	Dance	Music	Result
Marlee & Fabian	21 (7, 7, 7)	Jive	"You May Be Right" — Billy Joel	Safe
Steve & Anna	21 (7, 7, 7)	Tango	"Jalousie" — Alfred Hause's Tango Orchestra	Eliminated
Cristián & Cheryl	25 (8, 8, 9)	Jive	"Don't Stop Me Now" — Queen	Safe
Mario & Karina	21 (7, 6, 8)	Tango	"El Tango de Roxanne" — José Feliciano, Ewan McGregor & Jacek Koman	Safe
Shannon & Derek	24 (8, 8, 8)	Jive	"Goody Two Shoes" — Adam Ant	Safe
Adam & Julianne	21 (7, 7, 7)	Tango	"I Can't Tell A Waltz From A Tango" — Alma Cogan	Safe
Marissa & Tony	19 (6, 7, 6)	Jive	"Girlfriend" — Avril Lavigne	Safe
Priscilla & Louis	26 (8, 9, 9)	Tango	"El Choclo" — Lalo Schifrin	Safe
Jason & Edyta	23 (8, 7, 8)	Jive	"I Got a Woman" — Ray Charles	Safe
Kristi & Mark	27 (9, 9, 9)	Tango	"Rio" — Duran Duran	Safe

=== Week 4 ===
Each couple performed either the paso doble or the Viennese waltz. Couples are listed in the order they performed.

Couple	Scores	Dance	Music	Result
Kristi & Mark	29 (10, 9, 10)	Paso doble	"Blue Monday" — New Order	Safe
Priscilla & Louis	22 (7, 7, 8)	Viennese waltz	"Do Right Woman, Do Right Man" — Etta James	Bottom two
Adam & Julianne	19 (6, 7, 6)	Paso doble	"The Plaza of Execution" — James Horner	Eliminated
Marlee & Fabian	24 (8, 8, 8)	Viennese waltz	"She's Always a Woman" — Billy Joel	Safe
Mario & Karina	24 (8, 7, 9)	Paso doble	"Higher Ground" — Stevie Wonder	Safe
Jason & Edyta	29 (10, 9, 10)	Viennese waltz	"It's a Man's, Man's, Man's World" — James Brown	Safe
Cristián & Cheryl	26 (9, 8, 9)	Paso doble	"La Virgen de la Macarena" — Canadian Brass	Safe
Shannon & Derek	28 (9, 10, 9)	Viennese waltz	"Keep Holding On" — Avril Lavigne	Safe
Marissa & Tony	24 (8, 8, 8)	Paso doble	"My Family Is My Life" — James Horner	Safe

=== Week 5 ===
Each couple performed either the rumba or the samba. Couples are listed in the order they performed.

Couple	Scores	Dance	Music	Result
Mario & Karina	27 (9, 9, 9)	Samba	"A-Tisket, A-Tasket" — Ella Fitzgerald & Chick Webb	Safe
Priscilla & Louis	21 (7, 7, 7)	Rumba	"The First Time Ever I Saw Your Face" — Roberta Flack	Eliminated
Marissa & Tony	24 (8, 8, 8)	Samba	"Tambourine" — Eve	Safe
Cristián & Cheryl	23 (7, 8, 8)	Rumba	"If You're Not the One" — Daniel Bedingfield	Bottom two
Marlee & Fabian	22 (7, 7, 8)	Samba	"Samba Hey" — El General	Safe
Kristi & Mark	29 (9, 10, 10)	Rumba	"Say" — John Mayer	Safe
Shannon & Derek	23 (8, 8, 7)	Samba	"Pon de Replay" — Rihanna	Safe
Jason & Edyta	27 (9, 9, 9)	Rumba	"You're All I Need to Get By" — Marvin Gaye & Tammi Terrell	Safe

=== Week 6 ===
Each couple performed one unlearned dance and a two-step group dance. Couples are listed in the order they performed.

Couple	Scores	Dance	Music	Result
Jason & Edyta	24 (8, 8, 8)	Cha-cha-cha	"Best of My Love" — The Emotions	Safe
Shannon & Derek	24 (8, 8, 8)	Rumba	"True Colors" — Cyndi Lauper	Safe
Marlee & Fabian	21 (7, 7, 7)	Mambo	"Mi Tierra" — Gloria Estefan	Eliminated
Cristián & Cheryl	27 (9, 9, 9)	Foxtrot	"Come Fly with Me" — Frank Sinatra	Safe
Marissa & Tony	26 (9, 8, 9)	Viennese waltz	"Delilah" — Tom Jones	Safe
Kristi & Mark	30 (10, 10, 10)	Jive	"Rip it Up" — Little Richard	Safe
Mario & Karina	28 (9, 9, 10)	Rumba	"Let's Get it On" — Marvin Gaye	Bottom two
Cristian & Cheryl Jason & Edyta Kristi & Mark Mario & Karina Marissa & Tony Marlee & Fabian Shannon & Derek	No scores received	Group; Two-step	"Cotton-Eyed Joe" — The Nashville Riders	

=== Week 7 ===
Each couple performed two unlearned dances. Couples are listed in the order they performed.

Couple	Scores	Dance	Music	Result
Marissa & Tony	27 (9, 9, 9)	Tango	"Champagne Tango" — Carlos Di Sarli	Bottom two
Marissa & Tony	25 (9, 8, 8)	Rumba	"Quando, Quando, Quando" — Engelbert Humperdinck	Bottom two
Cristián & Cheryl	25 (8, 8, 9)	Viennese waltz	"I'll Make Love to You" — Boyz II Men	Safe
Cristián & Cheryl	21 (7, 7, 7)	Samba	"Sobe Son" — Miami Sound Machine	Safe
Kristi & Mark	26 (9, 8, 9)	Viennese waltz	"I'm with You" — Avril Lavigne	Safe
Kristi & Mark	28 (10, 8, 10)	Cha-cha-cha	"Don't Stop the Music" — Rihanna	Safe
Mario & Karina	24 (8, 8, 8)	Foxtrot	"I'm Your Man" — Leonard Cohen	Safe
Mario & Karina	27 (9, 9, 9)	Mambo	"Mambo a la Sandoval" — Angel Melendez	Safe
Shannon & Derek	27 (9, 9, 9)	Tango	"Tanguedia II" — Ástor Piazzolla	Eliminated
Shannon & Derek	24 (8, 8, 8)	Mambo	"Ain't Nothing Wrong with That" — Robert Randolph and the Family Band	Eliminated
Jason & Edyta	29 (10, 9, 10)	Quickstep	"The Dirty Boogie" — The Brian Setzer Orchestra	Safe
Jason & Edyta	26 (9, 8, 9)	Paso doble	"Heavy Action" — Johnny Pearson	Safe

=== Week 8 ===
Each couple performed two unlearned dances. Couples are listed in the order they performed.

Couple	Scores	Dance	Music	Result
Kristi & Mark	29 (9, 10, 10)	Quickstep	"Billy a Dick" — Klaus Hallen	Safe
Kristi & Mark	26 (8, 9, 9)	Samba	"Volare" — Gipsy Kings	Safe
Mario & Karina	27 (9, 9, 9)	Viennese waltz	"If I Ain't Got You" — Alicia Keys	Eliminated
Mario & Karina	26 (9, 8, 9)	Jive	"Little Bitty Pretty One" — Frankie Lymon and the Teenagers	Eliminated
Marissa & Tony	25 (9, 8, 8)	Foxtrot	"New York, New York" — Frank Sinatra	Safe
Marissa & Tony	25 (8, 8, 9)	Mambo	"Ritmo de Chunga" — Perez Prado	Safe
Jason & Edyta	29 (10, 9, 10)	Tango	"Tango Barbaro" — Lalo Schifrin	Safe
Jason & Edyta	23 (8, 7, 8)	Samba	"It Had Better Be Tonight" — Michael Bublé	Safe
Cristián & Cheryl	28 (10, 9, 9)	Tango	"Beat It" — Michael Jackson	Safe
Cristián & Cheryl	29 (10, 9, 10)	Mambo	"Saca Tu Mujer" — Tito Puente Jr.	Safe

=== Week 9: Semifinals ===
Each couple performed two dance styles already performed earlier in the season. Couples are listed in the order they performed.

Couple	Scores	Dance	Music	Result
Jason & Edyta	28 (9, 10, 9)	Foxtrot	"Let's Call the Whole Thing Off" — Louis Armstrong & Ella Fitzgerald	Safe
Jason & Edyta	27 (9, 9, 9)	Paso doble	"El gato montés" — Manuel Penella	Safe
Marissa & Tony	26 (9, 9, 8)	Quickstep	"Around the World" — Buddy Greco	Eliminated
Marissa & Tony	26 (8, 9, 9)	Rumba	"Just the Two of Us" — Grover Washington Jr. & Bill Withers	Eliminated
Cristián & Cheryl	27 (9, 9, 9)	Viennese waltz	"Satellite" — Dave Matthews Band	Safe
Cristián & Cheryl	29 (10, 9, 10)	Samba	"Sweetheart from Venezuela" — Harry Belafonte	Safe
Kristi & Mark	29 (10, 9, 10)	Tango	"Midnight Tango" — Arthur Murray Orchestra	Safe
Kristi & Mark	28 (9, 9, 10)	Jive	"Nutbush City Limits" — Tina Turner	Safe

=== Week 10: Finals ===
On the first night, all three couples faced off in a group cha-cha-cha, where they received individual scores from the judges, and performed their freestyle routines. On the second night, each couple performed their favorite routine from the season. Couples are listed in the order they performed.

Night 1

Couple	Scores	Dance	Music	Result
Cristián & Cheryl	26 (8, 9, 9)	Group; Cha-cha-cha	"Dancing on the Ceiling" — Lionel Richie	
Jason & Edyta	24 (8, 8, 8)	Group; Cha-cha-cha	"Dancing on the Ceiling" — Lionel Richie	
Kristi & Mark	30 (10, 10, 10)	Group; Cha-cha-cha	"Dancing on the Ceiling" — Lionel Richie	
Kristi & Mark	30 (10, 10, 10)	Freestyle	"Working Day and Night" — Michael Jackson	Safe
Jason & Edyta	27 (9, 9, 9)	Freestyle	"Miami" — Will Smith	Safe
Cristián & Cheryl	26 (9, 8, 9)	Freestyle	"Suavemente" — Elvis Crespo	Eliminated (Third place)

Night 2

Couple	Scores	Dance	Music	Result
Kristi & Mark	30 (10, 10, 10)	Jive	"Rip It Up" — Little Richard	Winners
Jason & Edyta	30 (10, 10, 10)	Quickstep	"The Dirty Boogie" — The Brian Setzer Orchestra	Runners-up

== Dance chart ==
The couples performed the following each week:

- Week 1: One unlearned dance (cha-cha-cha or foxtrot)
- Week 2: One unlearned dance (mambo or quickstep)
- Week 3: One unlearned dance (jive or tango)
- Week 4: One unlearned dance (paso doble or Viennese waltz)
- Week 5: One unlearned dance (rumba or samba)
- Week 6: One unlearned dance & two-step group dance
- Week 7: Two unlearned dances
- Week 8: Two unlearned dances
- Week 9: Two unlearned dances
- Week 10 (Night 1): Group cha-cha-cha & freestyle
- Week 10 (Night 2): Favorite dance of the season

Color key:

No scores received

Dancing with the Stars (season 6) - Dance chart
Couple	Week															
Couple	1	2	3	4	5	6		7		8		9		10		
Couple	1	2	3	4	5	6		7		8		9		Night 1		Night 2
Kristi & Mark	Foxtrot	Mambo	Tango	Paso doble	Rumba	Jive	Group; Two-step (Note: No scores were received for this dance.)	Viennese waltz	Cha-cha-cha	Quickstep	Samba	Tango	Jive	Group; Cha-cha-cha	Freestyle	Jive
Jason & Edyta	Foxtrot	Mambo	Jive	Viennese waltz	Rumba	Cha-cha-cha	Group; Two-step	Quickstep	Paso doble	Tango	Samba	Foxtrot	Paso doble	Group; Cha-cha-cha	Freestyle	Quickstep
Cristián & Cheryl	Cha-cha-cha	Quickstep	Jive	Paso doble	Rumba	Foxtrot	Group; Two-step	Viennese waltz	Samba	Tango	Mambo	Viennese waltz	Samba	Group; Cha-cha-cha	Freestyle	
Marissa & Tony	Cha-cha-cha	Quickstep	Jive	Paso doble	Samba	Viennese waltz	Group; Two-step	Tango	Rumba	Foxtrot	Mambo	Quickstep	Rumba			
Mario & Karina	Cha-cha-cha	Quickstep	Tango	Paso doble	Samba	Rumba	Group; Two-step	Foxtrot	Mambo	Viennese waltz	Jive					
Shannon & Derek	Cha-cha-cha	Quickstep	Jive	Viennese waltz	Samba	Rumba	Group; Two-step	Tango	Mambo							
Marlee & Fabian	Cha-cha-cha	Quickstep	Jive	Viennese waltz	Samba	Mambo	Group; Two-step									
Priscilla & Louis	Foxtrot	Mambo	Tango	Viennese waltz	Rumba											
Adam & Julianne	Foxtrot	Mambo	Tango	Paso doble												
Steve & Anna	Foxtrot	Mambo	Tango													
Monica & Jonathan	Foxtrot	Mambo														
Penn & Kym	Cha-cha-cha	Quickstep														
