= BYU Ballroom Dance Company =

Dance Company at Brigham Young University

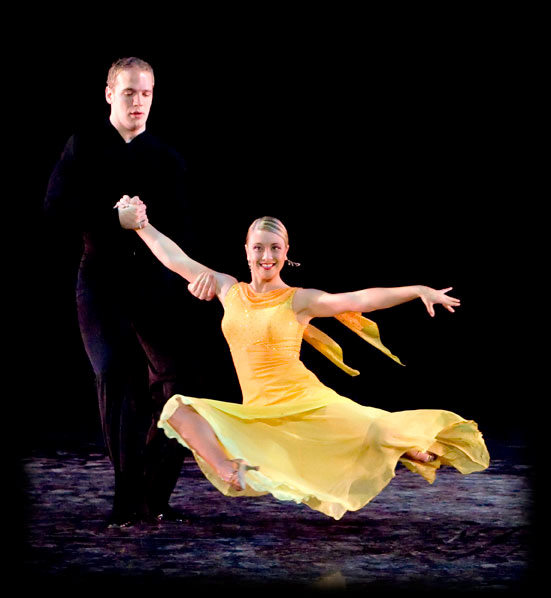
BYU dancers

The BYU Ballroom Dance Company is a collegiate ballroom dance team based at Brigham Young University (BYU). The team consists of dancers selected through a competitive audition process. The dancers are trained in multiple ballroom styles, including Standard, Latin, Smooth, and Rhythm.

The BYU Ballroom Dance Company has won multiple British Ballroom Formation Dancing Championships at the annual Blackpool Dance Festival.

The company regularly travels to countries across Europe, Asia, and other parts of the world, representing both BYU and the United States. These tours often include collaborations with other performing groups and provide cultural exchange opportunities, allowing dancers to connect with people from different backgrounds.

The BYU Ballroom Dance Company also performs at university events, showcases, and concerts on BYU's campus. Their routines often blend traditional ballroom with modern themes, music, and theatrical elements.

== History ==
For years, BYU offered dance classes that included various genres but with a specific focus on social dance. In 1953, Alma Heaton joined the faculty as a recreation professor. Heaton came to BYU having taught social dance at a nationally recognized dance studio, and it seemed logical to continue that instruction at the university level. Heaton's work set the stage for BYU to become a leader in ballroom dance. The Ballroom Dance program has been growing ever since and is now the largest collegiate ballroom dance program in the world. In 1960, Benjamin F. de Hoyos (a BYU professor in the BYU College of Health and Human Performance) founded the Ballroom Dance Company and was the director for 10 years. Following de Hoyos, the company was directed by Roy and June Mavor (1970–1975), Emerson Lyman and his wife LeGene (1975–1980), Lee Wakefield and his wife Linda (1980–2014), and Curt and Sharon Holman (2015–present). "BYU was the first university to introduce dance into its curriculum; the school's involvement in the sport stretches back for a long time," said Brian McDonald, president of the National Dance Council of America, which governs dance competitions in the United States. "And now BYU is, without question, the most influential school in the nation in terms of identifying dance as both a sport and a respected curriculum."

== Faculty ==
- Curt and Sharon Holman – former competitors in Professional Latin American and Theater Arts Category. As Cabaret dancers, they were finalists in U.S., British, and World competitions. Both have master's degrees in Dance (MFA, Brigham Young University) and are dual licentiates with the Imperial Society of Teachers of Dance. Curt, an associate professor, is the division director of Ballroom Dance at Brigham Young University. Sharon directs the BYU Ballroom Dance for the youth program.
- Brent Keck – a former competitor in the Professional Latin-American division and holds a master's degree in dance. He is a dual licentiate with the Imperial Society of Teachers of Dance and is recognized by the National Dance Council of America (NDCA) as a "Championship" judge. Keck is the National Committee Executive Secretary of the American International Dancers Association and is an Associate Professor at BYU. His direction of the BYU Youth Dancesport "A" Teams helped them win 26 United States National Formation Championship titles in the Youth Latin and Ballroom categories.

== Organization ==
The BYU Ballroom Dance Company has 160 members and is currently composed of five teams. It is directed by the Holmans. The five teams include: The Touring Company, directed by Curt and Sharon Holman; The Showcase Company, directed by Keck; Ensembles I (intermediate), II, and III (beginning), directed by staff members.

== Medleys ==
BYU’s Ballroom program competes two medleys that change themes every three years. They compete one Latin medley consisting of the cha-cha, rumba, samba, jive, and pasodoble. They also compete one standard medley consisting of the waltz, tango, foxtrot, quickstep, and Viennese waltz. The medleys below are the themes that they have used.

Latin:

- This Moment (2026-present)
- Somebody to Love (2023-26)
- Carmen (2020-23)

Standard:

- Le Classique (2026-present)
- Fiddler on the Roof (2023-26)
- The Sound of Music (2020-23)

== Competitions ==
In 1993, BYU was selected to host the World Amateur Championships. This eventually led to BYU's selection to host the U.S. Amateur Ballroom Dance Championships, considered to be one of the most prestigious amateur ballroom dance competition in the United States.

The BYU Dance Company currently competes on both national and international levels. The most recognized competitions that BYU participates in are: The United States National Formation Championships, The World Formation Championships (NDCA), and The British Formation Championships. The British Formation Championship is considered the most prestigious event in the competitive dance arena for individual competitors, despite not for formation teams. All three competitions comprise a variety of events in both the International Standard and Latin categories, but the BYU Ballroom Dance Company only competes in the team formation events.

== Awards ==
Since 1982, the BYU Ballroom Dance Company has annually won the NDCA title of United States National Formation Dance Champions.

Since 1971, the company has competed at the British Open ballroom competition every three years, often placing first in both Latin and Standard formation categories.

The BYU Ballroom Dance Company are the first Americans to win the British Formation Championships, and they have done so ten times.

== Performances ==
=== Tours ===
The BYU Ballroom Dance Company touring team has been touring since 1971.

- 2022-23 1. Nevada and California 2. England and Belgium
- 2021-22 1. Colorado and Wyoming 2. Belgium, France, Germany
- 2020-21 1. Livestreamed "Virtual Tour"
- 2019-20 1. Tour cancelled due to the COVID-19 Pandemic
- 2018-19 1. England, France, Belgium, France, Switzerland
- 2017-18 1. New York, Virginia, Washington DC, North Carolina, Pennsylvania, New Jersey, Connecticut, Massachusetts
- 2016-17 1. Chile and Argentina
- 2015-16 1. England, Scotland, and Wales
- 2014-15 1. Arizona, Utah 2. Nauvoo, IL
- 2013-14 1. Colorado, Wyoming 2. China, Hong Kong
- 2012-13 1. Arizona, Utah, Idaho, Montana 2. England, Germany, Switzerland
- 2009-10 1. Utah, Nevada, California. 2. England and Scotland
- 2008-09 1. Idaho, Oregon, Washington 2. Mid-West and Eastern United States
- 2007-08 1. Arizona, Utah 2. Hong Kong, China
- 2006-07 1. New Mexico, Texas 2. England, Belgium, France, Switzerland, Italy, France, Spain
- 2005-06 1. Colorado, Wyoming 2. Ukraine, Nauvoo, IL
- 2004-05 1. Northern Nevada and California 2. Hawaii, New Zealand, Australia, French Polynesia, Nauvoo, IL
- 2003-04 1. Southern Utah, Nevada, California 2. England, Belgium, France, Spain, Nauvoo, IL
- 2002-03 1. Washington
- 2001-02 1. Wyoming 2. Mid-West and Eastern United States
- 2000-01 1. New Mexico, Texas 2. England, Norway, Sweden, Denmark
- 1999-00 1. Arizona 2. Hong Kong, People's Republic of China, Far East Russia, South Korea, Mongolia
- 1998-99 1. Northern Nevada, California 2. South Africa
- 1997-98 1. Oregon, Washington, Idaho 2. England, Scotland
- 1996-97 1. Southern Nevada, California 2. Estonia, Lithuania, Latvia, Russia, Finland 3. Taiwan, Malaysia, Singapore, Philippines
- 1995-96 1. Arizona 2. Tennessee, Arkansas, Louisiana, Mississippi, Florida, North Carolina, South Carolina, Alabama, Georgia 3. Taiwan, Malaysia
- 1994-95 1. New Mexico, Texas 2. England, Scotland, Belgium, Germany, France
- 1993-94 1. Northern Nevada, California 2. Russia, Ukraine, Hungary
- 1992-93 1. Washington, Oregon, Idaho 2. Utah, California, People's Republic of China, Republic of China, Thailand
- 1991-92 1. Utah, Nevada, Southern California 2. England, Belgium, Netherlands
- 1990-91 1. Northern California 2. California, Illinois, Michigan, Canada, New York, Ohio, Pennsylvania, New Jersey, Connecticut, Maryland, Washington D.C.
- 1989-90 1. Miami, Florida (United States Ballroom Championships) 2. Stuttgart, Germany (World Ballroom Championships) 3. Arizona 4. Tahiti, New Zealand, Australia, Hawaii
- 1988-89 1. Miami, Florida (United States Ballroom Championships) 2. New Mexico 3. England, Belgium, West Germany, France, Switzerland, Austria, Michigan
- 1987-88 1. Miami, Florida (United States Ballroom Championships) 2. Southern California 3. Tennessee, Arkansas, Georgia, Florida, Alabama, Mississippi, Louisiana
- 1986-87 1. Miami, Florida (United States Ballroom Championships) 2. Bremen, Germany (World Ballroom Championships) 3. Northern California 4. People's Republic of China, Republic of China, Korea, Hong Kong, Thailand
- 1985-86 1. Miami, Florida (United States Ballroom Championships) 2. Washington, Oregon, Idaho 3. England, New York
- 1984-85 1. New York (United States Ballroom Championships) 2. Southern Utah, Nevada, California 3. Jordan (Jerash Festival)
- 1983-84 1. New York (United States Ballroom Championships) 2. Northern California 3. People's Republic of China, Republic of China, Thailand, Hong Kong, Korea, Japan, Hawaii
- 1982-83 1. Southern Nevada, California, Arizona, New Mexico 2. England, Belgium, Netherlands, Germany, Austria
- 1981-82 1. Northwest U.S.
- 1980-81 1. Southern California 2. England
- 1979-80 1. Washington
- 1978-79 1. Northern California 2. England, Belgium, Netherlands
- 1977-78 1. Oregon, Washington, Alberta 2. Colorado, Wyoming, Nebraska, Missouri, Kansas, Oklahoma
- 1976-77 1. Idaho, Oregon, Washington 2. England, Scotland
- 1974-75 1. England
- 1972-73 1. New York
- 1971-72 1. Idaho, Oregon, Washington 2. New Mexico, Texas

=== Concerts ===
The BYU Ballroom Dance Company annually presents the Ballroom Dance in Concert and has done so for 27 years. The concerts are currently performed in the Marriott Center at BYU. Prior to 1987, the concerts were performed in the Smith Field House at BYU. The pieces are the creative works of the Holmans, as well as guest choreographers and professional champion dancers from across the U.S. and Canada. Since 2003, concerts receive individual names. Prior concerts were simply titled "Ballroom Dance in Concert".

- 2026: Rhythm
- 2015: Bravo!
- 2014: Light Up the Night
- 2013: Jump and Jive
- 2012: Stripes and Starz
- 2011: Imagine
- 2010: Encore
- 2009: Viva España
- 2008: Seize The Beat
- 2007: Zoot Suit Sizzle
- 2006: Capture The Magic
- 2005: Cinemagic
- 2004: Rhythms of Rio
- 2003: Light Up The Night
- 1982–2002: Ballroom Dance in Concert

== See also ==
- Ballroom Dance
- BYU
