= U.S. National Dancesport Champions (Professional Rhythm) =

The United States national professional ballroom dance champions are crowned at the United States Dance Championships (formerly USDSC, and USBC), as recognized by the National Dance Council of America (NDCA) and the World Dance & DanceSport Council (WD&DSC).

The American Rhythm division consists of American-style cha cha, rumba, East Coast swing, bolero, and mambo.

== U.S. National Champions ==
U.S. National Professional Rhythm Ballroom Dance / Dancesport Champions
1984	Charles & Jean Penatello	New Jersey
1985-1987	Joe Lozano & Jan Mattingly	Texas
1988-1992	Forrest Vance & Susie Thompson	Missouri
1993-2004	Bob Powers & Julia Gorchakova	Arizona
2005	Tony Dovolani & Inna Ivanenko	(New York (state)) New York
2006	Tony Dovolani & Elena Grinenko	(New York (state)) New York
2007-2010	Jose DeCamps & Joanna Zacharewicz	(New York (state)) New York
2011-2013	Decho Kraev & Bree Watson	Arizona
2014-2015	Emmanuel Pierre-Antoine & Liana Churilova	(New York (state)) New York
2016-2018	Nazar Norov & Irina Kudryashova	Florida
2019	Andre Paramonov & Natalie Paramonov	Florida
2020	Not held due to Covid-19 pandemic	
2021-2022	Andre Paramonov & Natalie Paramonov	Florida
2023-2025	Francesco Arietta & Jessa Briones	Pennsylvania

== See also ==
- U.S. National Dancesport Champions (Professional Standard)
- U.S. National Dancesport Champions (Professional Latin)
- U.S. National Dancesport Champions (Professional Smooth)
- U.S. National Dancesport Champions (Professional 10-Dance)
- U.S. National Dancesport Champions (Professional 9-Dance)
- Dancesport World Champions (rhythm)
