= Fabian Sanchez (dancer) =

American dancer

Fabian Sanchez is a professional dancer born in New York City, who grew up in Colombia. Fabian was the 2006 Mambo world champion.

== Dancing with the Stars ==
Sanchez joined as a pro dancer on ABC's hit Dancing with the Stars, Season 6 and was paired with actress Marlee Matlin. He and his wife are owners of a Fred Astaire Dance Studios franchise in Birmingham, Alabama. Fabian will be the new Salsa/Mambo choreographer for SYTYCD season 7.

=== Performances ===
With celebrity partner Marlee Matlin:

Week #	Dance/Song	Judges' score			Result
Week #	Dance/Song	Inaba	Goodman	Tonioli	Result
1	Cha-cha-cha/ "Get on Your Feet"	7	7	8	N/A
2	Quickstep/ "Mack the Knife"	8	8	8	Safe
3	Jive/ "You May Be Right"	7	7	7	Safe
4	Viennese Waltz/ "She's Always a Woman"	8	8	8	Safe
5	Samba/ "Samba Hey"	7	7	8	Safe
6	Mambo/ "Mi Tierra"; Country Western/ "Cotton-Eyed Joe"	7 No	7 Scores	7 Given	Eliminated
