= Fred Astaire Dance Studios =

Chain of dance studios co-founded by its namesake

- Company type: Private
- Industry: Dance education
- Founded: 1947; 79 years ago
- Founder: Charles Casanave, Chester Casanave, and Fred Astaire
- Headquarters: Longmeadow, Massachusetts
- Website: www.fredastaire.com

Fred Astaire Dance Studios, Inc. is a ballroom dance franchise chain of studios in the United States and Canada, named after and co-founded by dancer Fred Astaire. It is headquartered in Longmeadow, Massachusetts, USA.

The company was co-founded by Astaire along with Charles and Chester Casanave in 1947. Astaire divested his interest in the chain in 1966, while agreeing to the continued use of his name by the franchise. The studios became franchised in 1950; currently there are no corporate owned studios. Each franchise is individually owned & operated. Currently there are 140 Fred Astaire studios in the United States alone. As of December 2010, Fred Astaire Dance Studios began franchising around the world and has studios operating in countries like Lebanon and South Africa.

== Notable associates ==
The following dancers worked for and or started with Fred Astaire Dance Studios and won at least one United States Dance Championship.

- Tony Dovolani (Rhythm)
- Tony Dovolani & Elena Grinenko (Rhythm)
- Jose DeCamps (Rhythm)
- Bruce and Mary Christopherson 1982–1983 winners of United States Pre Champ, Rising Star, Hustle, and runner-up American Open in both American Smooth and Rhythm. Over 35 state and regional titles.
