= America's Ballroom Challenge =

- Directed by: Aida Moreno
- Presented by: Tony Meredith; Marilu Henner; Jasmine Guy; Ron Montez; Jean Louisa Kelly
- Country of origin: United States
- No. of seasons: 4
- No. of episodes: 13

Production
- Executive producer: Moreno/Lyons Productions
- Production location: Columbus, OH
- Running time: Varies

Original release
- Network: PBS
- Release: February 1, 2006 – May 8, 2015

America's Ballroom Challenge is a competitive ballroom dance television series that aired on Public Broadcasting Service in the United States between 2006 and 2009.

It is part of the annual Ohio Star Ball, a festival of DanceSport in Columbus, Ohio.

Each season typically consists of competitions in five categories, with the first four categories devoted to each of the major styles of competitive ballroom dance:

- American Smooth: Waltz, Tango, Foxtrot, Viennese Waltz
- American Rhythm: Cha Cha, Rumba, East Coast Swing, Bolero, Mambo
- International Standard: Waltz, Tango, Viennese Waltz, Foxtrot, Quickstep
- International Latin: Cha Cha, Samba, Rumba, Paso Doble, Jive

The last category is a "Grand Finale" with the four champion couples competing for the title of "America's Best" dancers.

== Episode guide ==
=== Season 1 (2006) ===
Hosted by Marilu Henner and Tony Meredith.

Season 1	Airdate	Category	Champions
Episode 1	February 1, 2006	American Smooth	Ben Ermis and Shalene Archer Ermis
Episode 1	February 1, 2006	American Rhythm	Tony Dovolani and Elena Grinenko
Episode 1	February 1, 2006	International Standard	Erminio Stefano and Liene Apale
Episode 1	February 1, 2006	International Latin	Andrei Gavriline and Elena Kryuchkova
Episode 2	February 8, 2006	Grand Finale	Andrei Gavriline and Elena Kryuchkova

=== Season 2 (2007) ===
Hosted by Marilu Henner and Tony Meredith.

Season 2	Airdate	Category	Champions
Episode 1	January 31, 2007	American Smooth	Ben Ermis and Shalene Archer-Ermis
Episode 2	February 7, 2007	American Rhythm	Tony Dovolani and Elena Grinenko
Episode 3	February 14, 2007	International Standard	Jonathan Wilkins and Katusha Demidova
Episode 4	February 21, 2007	International Latin	Andrei Gavriline and Elena Kryuchkova
Episode 5	February 28, 2007	Grand Finale	Jonathan Wilkins and Katusha Demidova

=== Season 3 (2008) ===
Hosted by Jasmine Guy and Ron Montez.

Season 3	Airdate	Category	Champions
Episode 1	January 30, 2008	American Smooth	Tomas Mielnicki and J.T. Thomas
Episode 2	February 6, 2008	American Rhythm	Jose DeCamps and Joanna Zacharewicz
Episode 3	February 13, 2008	International Standard	Arunas Bizokas and Katusha Demidova
Episode 4	February 20, 2008	International Latin	Andrei Gavriline and Elena Kryuchkova
Episode 5	February 27, 2008	Grand Finale	Andrei Gavriline and Elena Kryuchkova

=== Season 4 (2009) ===
Hosted by Jean Louisa Kelly and Ron Montez.

Season 4	Airdate	Category	Champions
Episode 1	February 25, 2009	American Smooth	Jonathan Roberts and Valentina Kostenko
Episode 1	February 25, 2009	American Rhythm	Jose DeCamps and Joanna Zacharewicz
Episode 1	February 25, 2009	International Standard	Mikhail Avdeev and Anastasia Muravyeva
Episode 1	February 25, 2009	International Latin	Riccardo Cocchi and Yulia Zagoruychenko
Episode 1	February 25, 2009	Grand Finale	Riccardo Cocchi and Yulia Zagoruychenko

The 2009 season (which would have aired in 2010) was not produced.

The 2010 season (which would have aired in 2011) was not produced.

== Championship Ballroom Dancing ==
Prior to America's Ballroom Challenge, PBS was featuring Championship Ballroom Dancing, also from the Ohio Star Ball, annually since 1980. The one-show event featured the final rounds of the International Standard and International Latin Styles of the competition with exhibitions in between usually by winners from other categories not shown on broadcast.
