= Emmanuel Pierre-Antoine =

Haitian ballroom dancer

Emmanuel Pierre-Antoine (born in Haiti) is a professional ballroom dancer based in New York City. He currently competes in the American Rhythm division with Liana Churilova and is ranked first in the United States.

A student of ballet, jazz, modern dance, Haitian folklore, and ballroom dance, his passion for partner dancing led him to found Caminito, a top school of international-style ballroom dance in his native Haiti. He came to be honored as an official dance representative of Haiti when competing abroad.

Antoine closed Caminito in 2003 and moved to New York to further his dance career. In 2004, he partnered with fellow Haitian Alexandra Gregoire in American Rhythm, and the two took 4th place in the World Mambo Championships that year. Between 2005 and 2006, the pair also won the Empire State Ballroom Challenge and Las Vegas Holiday Classic.

After Gregoire moved to Florida to be with family, Antoine paired with fellow Stepping Out Studios instructor Joanna Zacharewicz. They won the World Mambo Championships in 2005, and got 2nd place in the 2006 U.S. National Dancesport Champions (Professional Rhythm) in 2006. Their success also garnered them appearances on PBS' America's Ballroom Challenge and ABC's Dancing With The Stars.

In 2007, Zacharewicz and Antoine ended their partnership, and Antoine paired with American Rhythm champion Julia Powers, whose husband and longtime partner Bob Powers had been forced to retire from competition due to an injury. The pair placed 3rd in the U.S. National Dancesport Champions (Professional Rhythm), and 2nd in the National Showdance Championships in American Rhythm.

His two-year-old son, Ishaan, was killed in the 2010 Haiti earthquake.
