= Tony Dovolani =

Albanian-American ballroom dancer, instructor, and judge

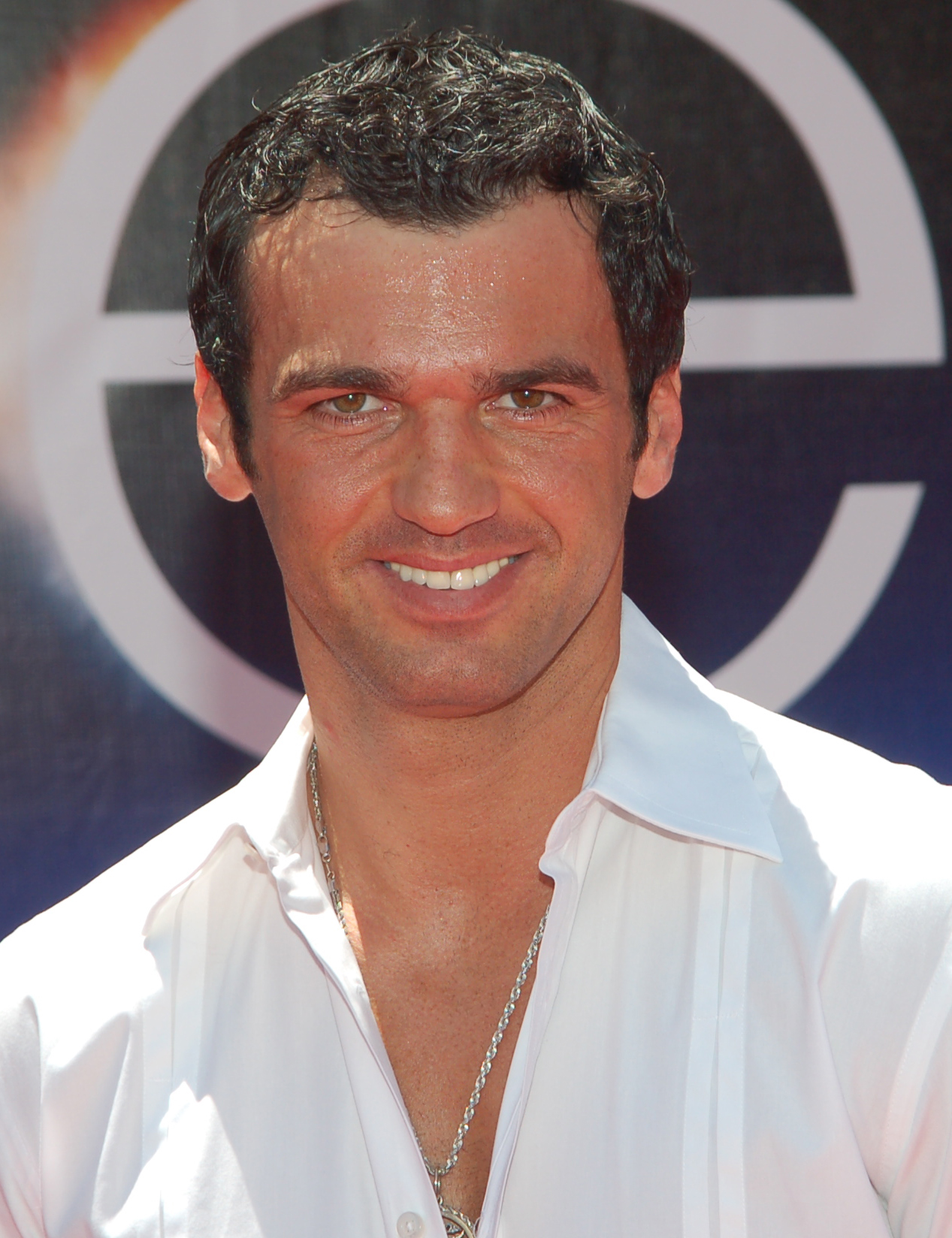
- Dovolani at the premiere for Earth in April 2009
- Born: Driton Dovolani; July 17, 1973 (age 53); Pristina, Yugoslavia
- Occupations: Ballroom dancer; instructor; judge; actor
- Spouse: Lina Dovolani (m. 1999)

Driton Dovolani (born July 17, 1973), commonly known as Tony Dovolani, is an Albanian-American professional ballroom dancer, instructor and judge. He is known for his involvement in the American version of Dancing with the Stars on ABC. Dovolani also portrayed Slick Willy in the hit film Shall We Dance? and spent time coaching actress Jennifer Lopez.

== Early life ==
Dovolani was born in Pristina, Kosovo, to Albanian parents from Debar, North Macedonia. He began folk dancing at the age of three. When he was fifteen, his family moved to Stamford, Connecticut. He got the opportunity to attend classes at a Fred Astaire Dance Academy.

== Dancing with the Stars ==
Season	Partner	Place
2	Stacy Keibler	3rd
3	Sara Evans	6th
4	Leeza Gibbons	9th
5	Jane Seymour	6th
6	Marissa Jaret Winokur	4th
7	Susan Lucci	6th
8	Melissa Rycroft	3rd
9	Kathy Ireland	14th
10	Kate Gosselin	8th
11	Audrina Patridge	7th
12	Wendy Williams	10th
13	Chynna Phillips	9th
14	Martina Navratilova	12th
15	Melissa Rycroft	1st
16	Wynonna Judd	11th
17	Leah Remini	5th
18	NeNe Leakes	7th
19	Betsey Johnson	10th
20	Suzanne Somers	9th
21	Kim Zolciak-Biermann	11th
22	Marla Maples	10th

Dovolani joined the show in its second season and was partnered with professional wrestler Stacy Keibler; they made it to the finals and finished in third place. In Season 3, he was partnered with country music star Sara Evans. Midway through the season, Evans withdrew from the competition for personal reasons. He returned to the show on March 19 for Season 4, this time partnered with talk show host Leeza Gibbons. They were the third couple eliminated from the competition and finished in 9th place.

He competed in Season 5, partnered with actress Jane Seymour. They were the seventh couple eliminated from the competition and finished in sixth place. In Season 6, his partner was Broadway actress Marissa Jaret Winokur. They were eliminated in the semi-finals and finished in fourth place. Dovolani competed in Season 7 of Dancing with the Stars with actress Susan Lucci of All My Children as his partner. They were eliminated in Week 7 and came in sixth.

In the eighth season, he was originally paired with Nancy O'Dell, the then-host of Access Hollywood. However, on March 5 she withdrew from the competition because of a torn meniscus sustained during pre-season practice. With only two days to practice, Melissa Rycroft, fresh off her The Bachelor appearance, stepped in and became his new celebrity partner. They made it to the finals and took third place in the competition.

In the ninth season, he was partnered with former model and entrepreneur Kathy Ireland. They were the third couple to be eliminated, finishing in 14th place. For Season Ten, Dovolani was partnered with former reality star Kate Gosselin from Jon and Kate Plus 8/Kate Plus 8. They were the fourth couple eliminated, finishing in 8th place.

For the eleventh season, he was partnered with The Hills star Audrina Patridge. They were the sixth couple eliminated, finishing in 7th place. For Season 12, his partner was talk show host Wendy Williams. They were the second couple eliminated, finishing in tenth place. For Season 13, his partner was singer Chynna Phillips. Phillips was eliminated in week four.

For Season 14, his partner was the tennis champion Martina Navratilova. They were the first couple to be eliminated. Dovalani was once again partnered with Melissa Rycroft for All-Stars season 15 and they became champions of the season, making him the oldest pro winner at age 39. For season 16, he partnered with country singer Wynonna Judd and was eliminated in the third week of the competition. For season 17, he was partnered with actress Leah Remini and finished in 5th place.

For Season 18, he was partnered with Real Housewives of Atlanta star NeNe Leakes and was eliminated on the seventh week of competition, finishing in seventh place. For season 19, he paired with fashion designer Betsey Johnson. They were eliminated in the fourth week of competition, finishing in tenth place. For season 20, he paired with actress & author Suzanne Somers. They were eliminated on Week 5 and finished in 9th place.

For season 21, he was paired with reality star Kim Zolciak-Biermann. After suffering from a mini-stroke, Biermann had to withdraw from the competition during Week 3 because she was not clear to travel.

For season 22, he was partnered with actress Marla Maples. They were eliminated on April 11, 2016, and came in 10th place.

On February 8, 2018, Dovolani revealed that he had officially left Dancing with the Stars.

== Performances by season ==
=== With Stacy Keibler ===
- Average: 27.7

Week #	Dance/Song	Judges' score			Result
Week #	Dance/Song	Inaba	Goodman	Tonioli	Result
1	Waltz/ "I Wonder Why"	8	6	8	Safe
2	Rumba/ "I'm like a Bird"	9	10	10	Safe
3	Tango/ "Cell Block Tango"	9	9	9	Safe
4	Foxtrot/"Cold, Cold Heart"	8	9	9	Safe
5	Samba/"Bootylicious"	10	10	10	Safe
6	Jive/"Wake Me Up Before You Go-Go"	10	10	10	Safe
7	Quickstep/"You Can't Hurry Love"; Cha-Cha-Cha/"Since U Been Gone"	9; 9	9; 9	9; 10	Safe
8	Jive/"Wake Me Up Before You Go-Go"; Freestyle/"Stayin' Alive"; Samba/"Livin' La Vida Loca"	10; 8; 10	10; 9; 10	10; 9; 10	Third place

=== With Sara Evans ===
- Average: 21.0

Week #	Dance/Song	Judges' score			Result
Week #	Dance/Song	Inaba	Goodman	Tonioli	Result
1	Foxtrot/ "Mandy"	5	5	5	Safe
2	Mambo/ "Papa Loves Mambo"	7	7	7	Safe
3	Jive/ "These Boots Are Made for Walkin'"	8	9	8	Safe
4	Paso Doble/ "The Phantom of the Opera"	6	7	7	Safe
5	Samba/ "I Wish"	8	8	8	Withdrew

=== With Leeza Gibbons ===
- Average: 19.0

Week #	Dance/Song	Judges' score			Result
Week #	Dance/Song	Inaba	Goodman	Tonioli	Result
1	Foxtrot/ "Strangers in the Night"	5	5	5	No Elimination
2	Mambo/ "Independent Woman Part I"	7	7	7	Safe
3	Tango/ "Jealousy"	8	8	8	Bottom 2
4	Paso Doble/ "You Give Love a Bad Name"	6	5	5	Eliminated

=== With Jane Seymour ===
- Average: 24.5

Week #	Dance/Song	Judges' score			Result
Week #	Dance/Song	Inaba	Goodman	Tonioli	Result
1	Foxtrot/ "Let's Do It, Let's Fall in Love"	8	8	8	Safe
2	Mambo/ "Cuban Pete"	7	7	7	Safe
3	Tango/ "Perfida"	9	9	9	Safe
4	Vienesse Waltz/ "Piano Man"	8	9	9	Safe
5	Rumba/ "Breathe Again"	8	9	9	Bottom Two
6	Jive/ "Modern Love"	8	7	7	Safe
7	Quickstep/ "I Walk the Line"; Cha-Cha-Cha/ "Venus"	8; 8	8; 9	8; 9	Eliminated

=== With Marissa Jaret Winokur ===
- Average: 23.8

Week #	Dance/Song	Judges' score			Result
Week #	Dance/Song	Inaba	Goodman	Tonioli	Result
1	Cha-Cha-Cha/ "Low"	6	6	6	No Elimination
2	Quickstep/ "Flip, Flop and Fly"	7	7	7	Last to be called safe
3	Jive/ "Girlfriend"	6	7	6	Safe
4	Paso Doble/ "My Family is My Life"	8	8	8	Safe
5	Samba/ "Tambourine"	8	8	8	Safe
6	Vienesse Waltz/ "Delilah"	9	8	9	Safe
7	Tango/ "Champagne Tango"; Rumba/ "Quando, Quando, Quando"	9; 9	9; 8	9; 8	Bottom 2
8	Foxtrot/ "New York City"; Mambo/ "Ritmo de Chunga"	9; 8	8; 8	8; 9	Safe
9	Quickstep/ "Around the World"; Rumba/ "Just the Two of Us"	9; 8	9; 9	8; 9	Eliminated

=== With Susan Lucci ===
- Average: 21.3

Week #	Dance/Song	Judges' score			Result
Week #	Dance/Song	Inaba	Goodman	Tonioli	Result
1	Cha-Cha-Cha/ "I Heard It Through the Grapevine"; Quickstep/ "Bei Mir Bist Du Schoen"	5; 7	5; 7	5; 8	Safe
2	Rumba/ "Waiting on the World to Change"	7	7	7	Safe
3	Jive/ "Why Do Fools Fall in Love"	7	7	7	Safe
4	Tango/ "La Bohemia"	8	8	8	Safe
5	Hustle/ "Upside Down"	7	7	8	Bottom 2
6	Mambo/ "Si Señor!..."	8	8*	7	Last to be called safe
7	Paso Doble/ "The Ride"; Team Cha-Cha-Cha/ "Mercy"	8; 6	8; 7	8; 7	Eliminated

- Score was awarded by stand in judge Michael Flatley.

=== With Melissa Rycroft ===
- Average: 26.8

Week #	Dance/Song	Judges' score			Result
Week #	Dance/Song	Inaba	Goodman	Tonioli	Result
1	Waltz/ "Moon River"	8	7	8	No Elimination
2	Salsa/ "The Cup of Life"	9	8	9	Safe
3	Foxtrot/ "Recipe for Love"	9	9	9	Safe
4	Lindy Hop/ "Brown Derby Jump"	10	9	10	Safe
5	Paso Doble/ "Poker Face"	8	8	9	Safe
6	Rumba/ "If I Were a Boy"	9	9	9	Safe
7	Argentine Tango/ "Mi Confesión"	10	9	10	Safe
8	Jive/ "We Got the Beat"; Team Mambo/ "Single Ladies (Put a Ring on It)"	7; 8	7; 8	7; 9	Bottom Two
9	Viennese Waltz/ "Angel"; Samba/ "Jaleo"	9; 10	9; 10	9; 10	Safe
10	Quickstep/ "I Got Rhythm"; Cha-Cha-Cha/ "Save the Last Dance for Me"	9; 9	10; 9	9; 9	Bottom Two
11	Paso Doble/ "So What"; Freestyle/ "Gonna Make You Sweat (Everybody Dance Now)"; Samba/ "Jaleo"	10; 9; 10	9; 9; 10	10; 9; 10	Third place

=== With Kathy Ireland ===
- Average: 17.0

Week #	Dance/Song	Judges' score			Result
Week #	Dance/Song	Inaba	Goodman	Tonioli	Result
1	Salsa/ "Mambo Gonzon"; Foxtrot relay/ "The Best is Yet to Come"	6 Awarded	5; 4	5 Points	Last to be Called Safe
2	Quickstep/ "Shall We Dance?"	6	6*	6	Eliminated

- Score was awarded by stand in judge Baz Luhrmann.

=== With Kate Gosselin ===
- Average: 15.5

Week #	Dance/Song	Judges' score			Result
Week #	Dance/Song	Inaba	Goodman	Tonioli	Result
1	Viennese Waltz/ "She's Always a Woman"	6	5	5	No Elimination
2	Jive/ "I'm Still Standing"	5	5	5	Safe
3	Paso Doble/ "Paparazzi"	5	5	5	Safe
4	Tango/ "For Your Entertainment"	4; 6	5; 6	5; 6	Safe
5	Foxtrot/ "Don't You (Forget About Me)"	5	5	5	Eliminated

=== With Audrina Patridge ===
- Average: 23.0

Week #	Dance/Song	Judges' score			Result
Week #	Dance/Song	Inaba	Goodman	Tonioli	Result
1	Cha-Cha-Cha/ "California Gurls"	6	7	6	Safe
2	Quickstep/ "Love Machine"	8	8	7	Safe
3	Waltz/ "Let It Be Me"	8	9	9	Safe
4	Argentine Tango/ "Somebody to Love"	8; 7	8; 7	8; 8	Safe
5	Rumba/"Unwritten"	7	8	8	Safe
6	Paso Doble/"Another One Bites the Dust"; Rock 'n Roll/"La Grange"	8 Awarded	8; 8	8 Points	Eliminated

=== With Wendy Williams ===
- Average: 15.3

Week #	Dance/Song	Judges' score			Result
Week #	Dance/Song	Inaba	Goodman	Tonioli	Result
1	Cha-Cha-Cha/ "I'm Every Woman"	5	4	5	No Elimination
2	Quickstep/ "Do Your Thing"	6	5	6	Safe
3	Foxtrot/ "Last Night a D.J. Saved My Life"	5	5	5	Eliminated

=== With Chynna Phillips ===
- Average: 22.5

Week #	Dance/Song	Judges' score			Result
Week #	Dance/Song	Inaba	Goodman	Tonioli	Result
1	Viennese Waltz / "If I Ain't Got You"	8	7	7	Safe
2	Jive / "The Boy Does Nothing"	7	7	7	Safe
3	Rumba / "Hold On"	8	9	9	Safe
4	Tango / "Theme from Mission: Impossible	7	7	7	Eliminated

=== With Martina Navratilova ===
- Average: 18.5

Week #	Dance/Song	Judges' score			Result
Week #	Dance/Song	Inaba	Goodman	Tonioli	Result
1	Foxtrot / "Is You Is or Is You Ain't My Baby"	7	6	7	No Elimination
2	Jive / "Tell Her About It"	6	5	6	Eliminated

=== With Melissa Rycroft ===
- Average: 28.0

Week #	Dance/Song	Judges' score			Result
Week #	Dance/Song	Inaba	Goodman	Tonioli	Result
1	Foxtrot/ "Big Spender"	7	7	7	Safe
2	Jive / "Shout"	8	8	7.5	Safe
3	Samba / "Conga"	9	9	9	Safe
4	Jitterbug / "This Cat's on a Hot Tin Roof"	9	9	9.5* / 9.5	Safe
5	Tango / "Toxic"; Team Freestyle (Shawn) / "Call Me Maybe"	9; 9.5	9; 10	9; 10	No Elimination
6	Viennese Waltz / "Why Ya Wanna"	9.5	10	10	Safe
7	Tango & Cha-Cha-Cha / "Die Young"; Swing Marathon / "Do Your Thing"	10; Awarded	9.5; 10	9.5; Points	No Elimination
8	Quickstep / "Boogie Woogie Bugle Boy"; Paso Doble (Trio Challenge) / "Rumour Has It"	10; 10	10; 10	10; 10	Safe
9	Hustle / "Walk the Dinosaur"; Argentine Tango / "Dirty Diana"	9; 10	9.5; 10	9; 10	Safe
10	Samba / "Conga"; Freestyle / "I Was Here"; Instant Samba / "Life Is A Highway"	10; 10; 9.5	10; 10; 9.5	10; 10; 9.5	Winners

^*The additional score of 9.5 was awarded by guest judge Paula Abdul.

=== With Wynonna Judd ===
- Average: 17.0

Week #	Dance/Song	Judges' score			Result
Week #	Dance/Song	Inaba	Goodman	Tonioli	Result
1	Cha-cha-cha / "I've Got The Music in Me"	6	6	6	No Elimination
2	Quickstep / "Neutron Dance"	6	6	6	Safe
3	Samba / "Pour Some Sugar on Me"	5	5	5	Eliminated

=== With Leah Remini ===
- Average: 24.8

Week #	Dance/Song	Judges' score			Result
Week #	Dance/Song	Inaba	Goodman	Tonioli	Result
1	Foxtrot / "Tears Dry On Their Own"	7	7	7	No Elimination
2	Samba / "María"	8	8	8	Safe
3	Rumba / "Skyfall"	8	8	8	Safe
4	Cha-cha-cha / "Papi"	8	8*	8	Safe
5	Contemporary / "Roar"	7	7	8	Last to be called safe
6	Quickstep / "Man Wanted"; Switch-Up Challenge /Various	9 Awarded	9; 1	9 Points	No Elimination
7	Salsa / "I Know You Want Me (Calle Ocho)"; Team Freestyle / "Bom Bom"	9; 9	8; 9	9; 9	Safe
8	Viennese Waltz / "I Got You Babe"; Rumba Dance Off / "I Found Someone"	8 Awarded	9*; 3	8 Points	Safe
9	Tango / "Love Me Again"; Jive (Trio Challenge) / "We're Not Gonna Take It"	9; 9	9; 9	9; 9	Safe
10	Paso Doble / "Bad Romance"; Argentine Tango / "Bad Romance" (acoustic version)	8; 8	8; 8	8*/8; 8*/9	Eliminated

- Score was given by guest judge Julianne Hough.
- Week 8 score was given by Cher.
- The additional score of Week 10 was given by Maksim Chmerkovskiy.

=== With NeNe Leakes ===
- Average: 23.5

Week #	Dance/Song	Judges' score			Result
Week #	Dance/Song	Inaba	Goodman	Tonioli	Result
1	Cha-cha-cha / "Give It 2 U"	7	7	7	No Elimination
2	Jive / "Do My Thing"	7	7	7	Safe
3	Rumba / "I Believe in You and Me"	8	7/8^{1}	8	Safe
4^{2}	Jazz / "Grown Woman"	8	8/8^{3}	8	No Elimination
5	Foxtrot / "Cruella de Vil"	9	9/9^{4}	9	Safe
6	Salsa / "Hot in Herre"	8	9^{5}/8	8	Safe
7	Argentine Tango / "Can't Remember to Forget You"; Team Freestyle / "The Cup of Life"	8; 8	8^{6} / 7; 10 /8	8; 9	Eliminated

^{1}The additional score of Week 3 was given by Robin Roberts

^{2}For this week only, as part of the "Partner Switch-Up" week, NeNe Leakes did not perform with Dovolani and instead performed with Derek Hough.

^{3}Additional score of Week 4 was given by Julianne Hough

^{4}Additional score of Week 5 was given by Donny Osmond

^{5}Additional score of Week 6 was given by Redfoo

^{6}Additional score of Week 7 was given by Ricky Martin

=== With Betsey Johnson ===
- Average: 26.5

Week #	Dance/Song	Judges' score				Result
Week #	Dance/Song	Hough	Goodman	Tonioli	Inaba	Result
1	Cha-cha-cha / "Material Girl"	5	5	5	5	Bottom two
2	Foxtrot / "Girls Just Want to Have Fun"	7	7	7	7	Safe
3	Contemporary / "Unchained Melody"	7	9^{1}	6	7	Safe
4	Jive / "Love Will Keep Us Together"	8	7^{2}	7	7	Eliminated

^{1} Score given by guest judge Kevin Hart, in place of Goodman.

^{2}The American public scored the dance in place of Goodman with the averaged score being counted alongside the three other judges.

=== With Suzanne Somers ===
- Average: 26.8

Week #	Dance/Song	Judges' score				Result
Week #	Dance/Song	Hough	Goodman	Tonioli	Inaba	Result
1	Cha-cha-cha / "Physical"	6	6	6	7	No Elimination
2	Jive / "Whole Lotta Shakin' Goin' On"	7	7	7	7	Last to be called safe
3	Samba / "Copacabana"	6	6	6	7	Safe
4	Foxtrot / "Three's Company, Too"	7	7	7	7	Safe
5	Jazz / "He's a Tramp"	7	7	7	7	Eliminated

=== With Kim Zolciak-Biermann ===
- Average: 16.3

Week #	Dance/Song	Judges' score			Result
Week #	Dance/Song	Inaba	Hough	Tonioli	Result
1	Salsa / "Hey Mama"	4	4	4	No Elimination
2	Quickstep / "Queen Bee"; Foxtrot / "Come Home"	7; 6	6; 6	6; 6	Safe
3	Samba / "Jeannie"	Was	Not	Performed	Withdrew

=== With Marla Maples ===
- Average: 20.8

Week #	Dance/Song	Judges' score			Result
Week #	Dance/Song	Inaba	Goodman	Tonioli	Result
1	Quickstep / "Sparkling Diamonds"	7	7	7	No Elimination
2	Argentine Tango / "Don't"	7	6	7	Safe
3	Jive / "Happy"	7	7	7	Safe
4	Waltz / "Part of Your World"	7	7/7^{1}	7	Eliminated

^{1} Score given by guest judge Zendaya.

== Dancing ==
Ballroom dancing is all about the woman, according to Dovolani. He believes the man is meant to be the frame for the picture of beauty as presented by the woman.

Dovolani and his partner Elena Grinenko have recently retired from competing in the American rhythm division. Prior to his partnership with Elena, he danced with Inna Ivanenko and Lisa Regal.

== Achievements ==
- 2006 nominated for an Emmy for outstanding choreography for Dancing with the Stars for episode No. 208 (Dance: Jive).
- 2006 PBS America's Ballroom Challenge Rhythm Champion
- 2006 Emerald Ball Open Professional American Rhythm Champion
- 2006 United States Open Rhythm Champion with Elena Grinenko
- 2006 World Rhythm Champion with Elena Grinenko
- 2005 Ohio Star Ball American Rhythm Champion
- 2005 United States Open Rhythm Champion with Inna Ivanenko
- 2005 World Rhythm Champion with Inna Ivanenko

== Outside dancing ==
Tony and Len Goodman appear along with Mary Murphy in an infomercial for the Core Rhythms workout system.

Dovolani and fellow dancers Maksim Chmerkovskiy and Elena Grinenko have created a website called the Ballroom Dance Channel. It is to help bring awareness to dancing. Dovolani and best friend Chmerkovskiy can often be found interviewing each other. The website is called ballroomdancechannel.com

Dovolani is the driving force behind the Superstars of Ballroom Dance Camp, an opportunity for people to learn from celebrity Pros from hit television shows. www.superstarsofballroom.com

Dovolani along with Maksim Chmerkovskiy and Valentin Chmerkovskiy opened Dance with Me Studio in Stamford, CT on April 16, 2012. The Stamford location is the fourth in the chain and the first in Connecticut started by Dovolani, Maksim Chmerkovskiy, Valentin Chmerkovskiy and their partners. The other studios are in Ridgefield, N.J., Long Island, N.Y., and Soho, N.Y. Tony left Dance With Me in middle 2018, to return to Fred Astaire, where he started learning ballroom.

In March 2024, Dovolani announced on his Instagram page that he had been cast as mob boss Johnny Desiderio in Kiss of the Spider Woman, an adaptation of the 1992 musical which in turn is an adaptation of the 1985 film based on the book of the same name.

=== Personal life ===
Tony is married to wife Lina, and the couple have 3 children, a daughter named Luana and twins born when Luana was 3 years old. The twins, son Adrian and daughter Ariana, were born on September 8, 2008. Tony met Lina on a blind date in 1998 and proposed to her four hours later. Tony was in the middle of rehearsals for the seventh season of Dancing with the Stars with partner Susan Lucci when he got the call that Lina had gone into labor.

== See also ==
- Dancesport World Champions (rhythm)
- U.S. National Dancesport Champions (Professional Rhythm)
- Dancing with the Stars (U.S. TV series)
