= Ron Montez =

American ballroom dancer, choreographer, adjudicator, and commentator

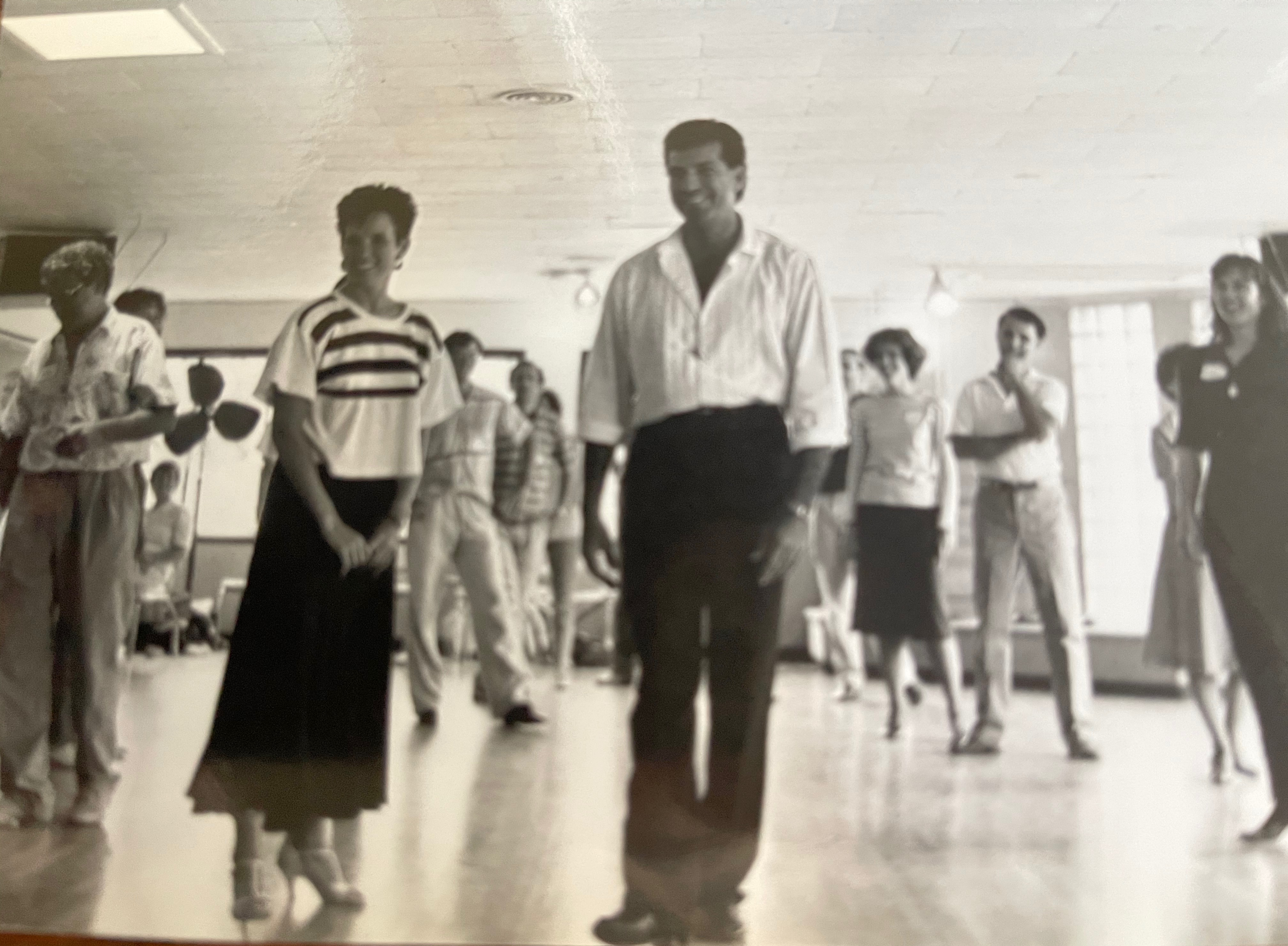
- Ron Montez teaching a cha-cha workshop at the Avenue Ballroom in San Francisco, 1989. Photo: Joel Koosed
- Born: August 28, 1946; Safford, Arizona, U.S.
- Died: January 24, 2021 (aged 74)
- Occupations: Ballroom dancer; choreographer; adjudicator; commentator

Ron Montez was a professional ballroom dance champion and choreographer who won the professional Latin division of the U.S. Dancesport Championships from 1979 to 1985.

He died of COVID-19 on January 24, 2021.

== See also ==
- U.S. National Dancesport Champions (Professional Latin)
- So You Think You Can Dance (Season 3)
- America's Ballroom Challenge
