= Torch This Place =

Studio album by the Atomic Fireballs
- Released: 18 May 1999
- Recorded: October–December 1998
- Studios: Armoury Studios, Vancouver, British Columbia, Canada
- Genre: Swing
- Length: 47:28
- Label: Lava / Atlantic
- Producer: Bruce Fairbairn

The Atomic Fireballs chronology
Birth of the Swerve (1998)	Torch This Place (1999)

Professional ratings
Review scores
Source	Rating
Allmusic	4/5 stars

Torch This Place is an album made in 1999 by the Atomic Fireballs. It is the band's only full-length studio release.

== Track listing ==
All songs by John Bunkley, except where indicated.

1. "Man with the Hex" – 3:01
2. "Mata Hari" – 3:44
3. "Swing Sweet Pussycat" – 3:11
4. "Caviar & Chitlins" – 2:46
5. "Lover Lies" (Randall Sly) – 3:19
6. "Spanish Fly" – 3:28
7. "Pango Pango" – 3:37
8. "Hit by a Brick" – 4:09
9. "Calypso King" (Bunkley, Sly) – 2:45
10. "Drink Drank Drunk" – 2:56
11. "Flowers in the Sand" (Shawn Scaggs) – 2:44
12. "Starve a Fever" (James Bostek, Bunkley) – 3:45

== Personnel ==
=== Band members ===
- James Bostek – trumpet
- Tony Buccilli – trombone
- John Bunkley – vocals
- Geoff Kinde – drums
- Duke Kingins – guitar
- Shawn Scaggs – double bass
- Eric Schabo – tenor saxophone
- Randy Sly – piano

=== Technical ===
- Bruce Fairbairn – producer
- Mike Plotnikoff – engineer, mixing
- George Marino – mastering

== In pop culture ==
"Man with the Hex" was used in multiple entries in the Scooby-Doo franchise, appearing in both "Big Scare in the Big Easy", the fourth episode of the first season of What's New, Scooby-Doo?, as well as the 2002 feature-length film Scooby-Doo and its accompanying soundtrack album.

It was also featured on the soundtrack albums for movies including American Pie and The Haunted Mansion.

It was used in several TV shows, most notably Dawson's Creek, and was featured on both Dancing With the Stars and So You Think You Can Dance as a quickstep.
