= BYU College of Health and Human Performance =

The BYU College of Health and Human Performance began as the College of Recreation, Physical Education, Health and Athletics in 1955. This college drew the Health, Physical Education and Recreation Department from the College of Education; the Intercollegiate Athletics and Intramural Sports department also from the College of Education; and incorporated the newly formed Scouting Department. The Health, P.E. and Recreation Department was split into four departments, Recreation, Health and Safety, Women's Physical Education and Dance, and Men's Physical Education and Pre-physical Therapy. In 1956 Intercollegiate Athletics and Intramural Sports were split into two programs. These programs were eventually moved outside of the academic structure of BYU to be non-college affiliated parts of the university.

The Department of Youth Leadership, originally the Department of Scouting, was founded at BYU by Royal Stone, who had served as a Boy Scouts of America executive. After being department head for four years, he left to return to employment with the Boy Scouts and was replaced by Thane Packer.

In 1960 the college's name was shortened to College of Physical Education. Prior to this the Scouting Department had been renamed first to Scouting Education and then to Youth Leadership. In 1963 the Health and Safety Department was renamed to Health and Safety Education. It was renamed again to Health Sciences in 1969. Later the men's and women's designations in Physical Education were dropped, and physical education classes merged into the same program as pre-physical therapy, while Dance became a separate department. At some point after 1997 the Physical Education Department was renamed the Exercise Science Department. At some point, the Recreation Education Department merged with the Youth Leadership Department.

The BYU College of Health and Human Performance was divided into four departments: Dance, Exercise Sciences, Health Science, and Recreation Management and Youth Leadership. The Dance Department offers majors in Dance and Dance Education, with minors in Ballroom Dance, World Dance and Modern Dance. The Exercise Science program offers majors in Athletic Training, Exercise and Wellness, Exercise Science, and Physical Education Teaching/Coaching. Only the last of these can also be pursued as a minor. The health science program offers majors in public health and school health education. There is a minor in health education as well as one in driver safety education. The Recreational Management and Youth Leadership department offers a major with that name, with choices of emphasis in either leisure services management or therapeutic recreation. It also offers a minor in non-profit management.

The College of Health and Human Performance was disbanded in 2009. The Department of Exercise Science and the Department of Health Science were merged into the College of Life Sciences while the Department of Dance was merged into the Department of Fine Arts and Communications. The Department of Recreational Management and Youth Leadership was transferred to the Marriott School of Management. To further complicate things, the Physical Education Teaching/Coaching Program was split from the Exercise Science Department and moved to the Teacher Education Department and thus became a sub-division of the David O. McKay College of Education.
