= Liana Churilova =

Russian dancer (born 1991)

- Born: April 25, 1991 (age 35); Perm, Russia.
- Occupation: Dancer
- Website: www.lianchurliova.com

Liana Churilova (Russian: Лиана Евгеньевна Чурилова; born April 25, 1991) is a professional ballroom dancer based in New York City. She was the NDCA World Professional Rhythm Champion, with her partner, Emmanuel Pierre-Antoine.

They were also featured on ABC's The View (14th annual Halloween "Transported in Time" extravaganza), and ABC's Dancing with the Stars (Tribute to Haiti 10th season).

Originally from Perm, Russia Liana began ballroom dancing at the early age of 6 and then at 11 years moved to Saint-Petersburg, Russia. At the age of 17 she decided to move to America and partnered with Emmanuel Pierre-Antoine. In 2013 Liana and Emmanuel became the World Professional American Rhythm Champions.

== Achievements ==
- 2 Time NDCA World Professional Rhythm Champion
- U.S. National American Rhythm Champion
- World Salsa Champion.
- 6 Time Arthur Murray World Professional American Rhythm Champion
- Saint-Petersburg Youth International Latin Champion
- America's Ballroom Challenge winner (2015)
