= The Atomic Fireballs =

American swing revival band formed 1996

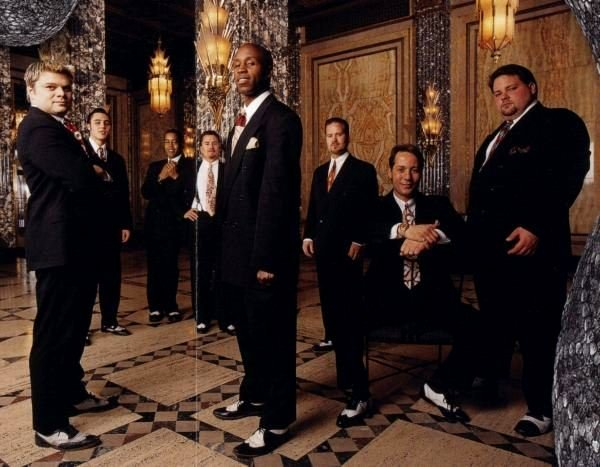
- The Atomic Fireballs (from left: Randy Sly, Tony Buccilli, Shawn Scaggs, Geoff Kinde, John Bunkley, James Bostek, Duke Kingins, Eric Schabo)

Background information
- Origin: Detroit, Michigan, U.S.
- Genres: Swing
- Years active: 1996–1999
- Labels: Orbital, Atlantic, Lava
- Past members: John Bunkley; James Bostek; Tony Buccilli; Geoff Kinde; Duke Kingins; Shawn Scaggs; Eric Schabo; Randy Sly; Seán E. Harris; Kenneth Ferry Jr.

The Atomic Fireballs were a Detroit swing revival band led by vocalist/songwriter John Bunkley. The group was formed during 1996 with Bunkley on vocals, James Bostek on trumpet, Tony Buccilli on trombone, Duke Kingins on guitar, Shawn Scaggs on double bass, Eric Schabo on tenor sax, Geoff Kinde on drums, and Randy Sly on piano. Scaggs was replaced by Seán E. Harris on double bass and Bostek was replaced by Kenneth Ferry Jr. on trumpet. The band was discovered by former Kid Rock manager Michael Rand. After booking the band nearly 60 concerts, Rand began the process of introducing the band to major record labels. The band was signed to Lava by A&R executives Rick Goetz and Jason Flom.

The Atomic Fireballs released two albums: Birth of the Swerve, which was released independently in 1998, produced at Tanglewood Studio in Brookfield, Illinois, and Torch This Place, which was released by Atlantic in 1999. Torch This Place was recorded at Armoury Studios in Vancouver, British Columbia, and was produced by Bruce Fairbairn along with engineers Mike Plotnikoff and Paul Silveira.

The band's biggest hit, "Man with the Hex", which interpolated the call and response from the 1947 film The Bachelor and the Bobby-Soxer, was included on the soundtracks of American Pie, Scooby Doo and The Haunted Mansion. This interpolation was also used in Labyrinth. "Man with the Hex" was used in several TV shows, most notably Dawson's Creek, and was featured on both Dancing With the Stars and So You Think You Can Dance as a quickstep. Visuals of the band performing "Swing Sweet Pussycat" are shown in the closing credits of the 1999 film Three to Tango.

The group disbanded in 1999, leaving the members to their own ventures. Bunkley produces paintings and solo works of music on his Bandcamp page. Kinde teaches drums and percussion at Oz's Music Ann Arbor, online lessons at Atomic Drummer and performs solo as Roland Remington. Schabo teaches history at Crestwood High School in Dearborn Heights, Michigan. Sly performs with The Verve Pipe.

== Influences ==
The band's influences include Louis Jordan and Black Flag.

== Discography ==
- Birth of the Swerve (1998)
- Torch This Place (1999)
