= Da Muzicianz =

Studio album by Da Muzicianz
- Released: May 23, 2006
- Recorded: Punnn!!! Studios (Atlanta, GA); The Zone Studios (Norcross, GA); ColliPark Studios (Atlanta, GA); Stankonia Recording (Atlanta, GA); Hoodstyle Studios (Atlanta, GA); The Bat Cave
- Genre: Southern hip-hop
- Length: 52:12
- Label: TVT
- Producer: Cheesie; Midnight Black; Mr. Collipark; Tom Slick

Singles from Da Muzicianz
- 1. "Camera Phone" Released: February 28, 2006; 2. "Girls I Know/Crazy Man" Released: May 16, 2006; 3. "Hush" Released: 2006

Professional ratings
Review scores
Source	Rating
AllHipHop	3/5 stars
PopMatters	7/10
RapReviews	6/10
Spin	3/5 stars
XXL	L (3/5)

Da Muzicianz (subtitled In Stores Now) is the only studio album by American Southern hip-hop Atlanta-based trio of the same name, composed of Ying Yang Twins' D-Roc and his younger brothers, Mr. Ball and Da Birthday Boy. It was released on May 23, 2006, via TVT Records. Produced by Mr. Collipark, Cheesy, Midnight Black and Tom Slick, it features guest appearances from Geeskie, Countrie Biggz, Fabo, Kaine, Kuzin Big Boyy, Mr. Collipark and Smitty J. The album debuted at number 137 on the Billboard 200, number 20 on the Top R&B/Hip-Hop Albums, number 7 on the Independent Albums and number 2 on the Heatseekers Albums charts in the United States. It was supported by three singles: "Camera Phone", "Girls I Know" b/w "Crazy Man", and "Hush". Its lead single made it to number 95 on the Billboard R&B charts. An accompanying music video for "Camera Phone" was directed by Juan Carlos. In early 2007, Da Muzicianz joined the Ying Yang Twins on Chemically Imbalanced tour.

== Track listing ==
No.	Title	Writer(s)	Producer(s)	Length
1.	"Intro"	D'eongelo Holmes; Michael Antoine Crooms	Mr. ColliPark	1:23
2.	"Bust It Wide Open"	D. Holmes; Courtney Holmes; Brandon Ivery Sams; Charles Anthony	Cheesy	4:49
3.	"Crazy Man" (featuring Geeskie, Kuzin Big Boyy and Countrie Biggz)	D. Holmes; C. Holmes; Sams; Ernest Troy Lee; Centurion Mines; Yumtobby Bernard Threatt; Anthony	Cheesy	4:25
4.	"Till Yo Back Git So'" (featuring Geeskie)	D. Holmes; C. Holmes; Sams; Lee; Anthony	Cheesy	5:07
5.	"Girls I Know" (featuring Fabo)	D. Holmes; C. Holmes; Sams; Lefabian Williams; Crooms	Mr. ColliPark	5:24
6.	"Hush"	D. Holmes; C. Holmes; Sams; Dean Charles; Crooms	Mr. ColliPark	3:48
7.	"Camera Phone" (featuring Mr. ColliPark)	D. Holmes; C. Holmes; Sams; Crooms; Dirtbag; Pjarro Scott	Mr. ColliPark; Tom Slick	3:32
8.	"Strip Leader" (featuring Kaine and Smitty J)	D. Holmes; C. Holmes; Sams; Eric Jackson; James Edward Smith; Anthony	Cheesy	3:43
9.	"On Me"	D. Holmes; C. Holmes; Sams; Tracey Sewell	Midnight Black	4:52
10.	"Go Dumb (Remix)"	D. Holmes; C. Holmes; Sams; Anthony	Cheesy	3:18
11.	"Get Yern"	D. Holmes; C. Holmes; Sams; Anthony	Cheesy	3:38
12.	"Pop That"	D. Holmes; C. Holmes; Sams; Sewell	Midnight Black	3:03
13.	"Mr. Collipark Speaks"			1:06
14.	"Gyrate" (featuring Mr. ColliPark)	D. Holmes; C. Holmes; Sams; Crooms	Mr. ColliPark	4:04
Total length:				52:12

== Charts ==
Chart (2006)	Peak position
US Billboard 200	137
US Top R&B/Hip-Hop Albums (Billboard)	20
US Independent Albums (Billboard)	7
US Heatseekers Albums (Billboard)	2
