= Joanna Zacharewicz =

Joanna Zacharewicz (b. in Poland) is a professional ballroom dancer based out of New York City. She won the U.S. National Dancesport Champions (Professional Rhythm) with her partner, Jose DeCamps, each year from 2007 to 2010.

She began dancing at the age of 8 in Poland, studying the International Latin and International Standard dances. Her early coaching included Latin champion Allan Tornsberg.

She first began competing in the American Rhythm division with Emmanuel Pierre-Antoine, a fellow instructor at Stepping Out Dance Studio in New York. The two garnered the title of World Professional Mambo Champions in 2005, and placed 2nd in the rhythm division at the 2006 U.S. National Dancesport Championships. They were also featured on PBS' America's Ballroom Challenge and ABC's Dancing With The Stars

With DeCamps, her current partner, she won the U.S. National Dancesport Champions (Professional Rhythm) title in all 2007, 2008, 2009 and 2010 as well as the 2007 World Professional Mambo Championship, World professional 2010 Salsa championships, 2007, 2008 and 2009 World Professional Rhythm Championship and World Professional Rhythm Showdance categories. In 2011, Zacharewicz and DeCamps won the Sabado Gigante "Asi se Baila" competition attended by couples from all over the world.

She currently teaches at Stepping Out Studios in New York.
