= National Dance Council of America =

Ballroom dance organization

The National Dance Council of America (NDCA) is an organization formed in 1948 which set standards for ballroom dance teachers and competitions.

== Description ==
The National Dance Council of America, (NDCA) – is the Official Governing Council of Dance and Dancesport in the United States of America. With 17 Member Organizations encompassing more than 25,000 dance professionals and over 110 sanctioned competitions and championships, it is the leading authority of dance for Professionals, Amateurs and Pro/Am Competitors.
