= Elena Grinenko =

Russian dancer

Elena Grinenko is a Russian-born American professional ballroom dance champion, choreographer, and instructor. She is best known as one of the professional dancers on the American television series Dancing with the Stars.

== Biography ==
Grinenko was born in Moscow, Russia, USSR, on December 14, 1976, and has been dancing since she was seven years old. She has been trained in ballroom dancing, ballet and Russian folk dancing. She worked with the Ballroom Formation Team of Russia, and when she reached her third year as a competitive professional dancer, she became a Soviet Union Finalist.

In 1994, she emerged as the Latin Division winner at both the Moscow and National Championships. She graduated from high school in 1995, and from there went on to study various kinds of dances at the Art Academy of Russia. In 1998, she moved to the United States, where she became one of the fastest rising stars in the dancing industry.

On August 17, 2012, she married model and actor Rib Hillis.

== Partnerships ==
After ten years of dancing with Michael Nadtochy, with whom she was Russian National Champion, she decided to form a partnership with Maksim Chmerkovskiy. Together they became one of the top finalist couples in the world in International Latin. Eventually, she was the undefeated U.S. and World Rhythm Champion with her last partner, Tony Dovolani.

== Dancing with the Stars ==
In 2006, Grinenko found herself competing against former Latin partner Chmerkovskiy, and American rhythm partner Dovolani when she was selected to join the cast of the third season of Dancing with the Stars.

She was paired with journalist Tucker Carlson; they were eliminated the first week.

Grinenko returned to the ballroom for the fourth season and was partnered with NBA star Clyde Drexler. They were the fourth couple to be eliminated. This ranked them in eighth place.

== Dancing with the Stars performances ==
With celebrity partner Tucker Carlson:

Week #	Dance/Song	Judges' score			Result
Week #	Dance/Song	Inaba	Goodman	Tonioli	Result
1	Cha-Cha-Cha/ "Dancing in the Street"	5	4	3	Eliminated

With celebrity partner Clyde Drexler:

Week #	Dance/Song	Judges' score			Result
Week #	Dance/Song	Inaba	Goodman	Tonioli	Result
1	Cha-cha-cha/ "I Was Made to Love Her"	6	5	5	No elimination
2	Quickstep/ "(Your Love Keeps Lifting Me) Higher and Higher"	6	6	6	Safe
3	Jive/ "Bad Moon Rising"	6	5	5	Safe
4	Waltz/ "Foolish"	6	4	5	Safe
5	Rumba/ "What's Going On?"	4	5	4	Eliminated

== Second World Dance Championship ==
In 2010, Grinenko was representing U.S.A. in the Second Dance World Championship (celebrated in Mexico). She was paired with Paul Barris. Elena came out from the competition after learning that she was pregnant. Her replacement was Snejana Petrova

== Achievements ==
Awards and achievements
Preceded by Kenny Mayne & Andrea Hale	Dancing with the Stars (US) last place Season 3 (Autumn 2006 with Tucker Carlson)	Succeeded by Paulina Porizkova & Alec Mazo

== See also ==
- U.S. National Dancesport Champions (Professional Rhythm)
- Dancing with the Stars (U.S. season 3)
- Dancing with the Stars (U.S. season 4)
