= Jose DeCamps =

Jose Decamps (born in Santiago, Dominican Republic) is a professional ballroom dancer based in New York City. He is perhaps best known as the 2007 U.S. National Dancesport Champions (Professional Rhythm) with his partner, Joanna Zacharewicz.

== Biography ==
Decamps began his competition dance career in 1991 as both a Latin and ballroom dancer, competing with Jami Josephson. The two won numerous titles, including 2nd place in the U.S. Professional Open Rhythm Championship in 1997, the Heritage Classic Championships in 1996, and 1st in the Sabado Gigante Contest in 1998. The pair also produced their own series of salsa instructional videos for the company Dancevision.

Decamps was featured as the principal dancer in the video for Debelah Morgan's 2000 single "Dance with Me".

Decamps briefly paired with Viktoriya Drubetskaya in 1999, competing in the International Latin division, before partnering with Cheryl Burke in 2002. The two won the Professional Rising Star category in International Latin at the Ohio Star Ball in 2005.

Decamps and Zacharewicz forged their partnership in March 2007. As a team they won the U.S. National Dancesport Champions (Professional Rhythm) title in the years 2007, 2008, 2009 and 2010. In addition they won: the 2007 World Professional Mambo Championship, World professional 2010 Salsa championships, 2007, 2008 and 2009 World Professional Rhythm Championship and World Professional Rhythm Showdance categories. Most recently (2011) Jose and Joanna won the Sabado Gigante "Asi se Baila", where they competed against couples from all over the world for a 10,000 dollar prize.

Jose and Joanna are now married and work and live in New York City.
